= Jastrzębski Węgiel squads =

This article shows the previous rosters of Jastrzębski Węgiel volleyball team at PlusLiga in Poland.

== 2020/2021 ==
The following is the Jastrzębski Węgiel roster in the 2020–21 PlusLiga.

Head coach:	(Australia) Luke Reynolds (2020 – Jan 2021) / (Italy) Andrea Gardini (January 2021 – present)
Assistants:	(Poland) Bogdan Szczebak, (Poland) Leszek Dejewski

No.	Name	Date of birth	Height	Weight	Spike	Position
3	(Poland) Jakub Popiwczak	17 April 1996	1.80 m (5 ft 11 in)	78 kg (172 lb)	320 cm (130 in)	libero
4	(France) Yacine Louati	4 March 1992	1.98 m (6 ft 6 in)	92 kg (203 lb)	350 cm (140 in)	outside hitter
5	(Poland) Jakub Bucki	13 August 1988	1.97 m (6 ft 6 in)	94 kg (207 lb)	327 cm (129 in)	opposite
8	(Poland) Michał Gierżot	4 October 2001	2.03 m (6 ft 8 in)	85 kg (187 lb)	355 cm (140 in)	outside hitter
9	(Poland) Łukasz Wiśniewski	3 February 1989	1.98 m (6 ft 6 in)	104 kg (229 lb)	343 cm (135 in)	middle blocker
10	(Germany) Lukas Kampa (C)	29 November 1986	1.93 m (6 ft 4 in)	90 kg (200 lb)	340 cm (130 in)	setter
11	(Morocco) Mohamed Al Hachdadi	2 February 1991	2.00 m (6 ft 7 in)	97 kg (214 lb)	343 cm (135 in)	opposite
12	(Poland) Stanisław Wawrzyńczyk	4 January 1990	2.00 m (6 ft 7 in)	98 kg (216 lb)	350 cm (140 in)	outside hitter
13	(Poland) Yuriy Gladyr	8 July 1984	2.02 m (6 ft 8 in)	96 kg (212 lb)	360 cm (140 in)	middle blocker
14	(Finland) Eemi Tervaportti	26 July 1989	1.93 m (6 ft 4 in)	74 kg (163 lb)	338 cm (133 in)	setter
15	(Poland) Michał Szalacha	15 January 1994	2.02 m (6 ft 8 in)	97 kg (214 lb)	365 cm (144 in)	middle blocker
20	(Poland) Patryk Cichosz–Dzyga	5 January 2001	2.10 m (6 ft 11 in)	100 kg (220 lb)	0 cm (0 in)	middle blocker
21	(Poland) Tomasz Fornal	31 August 1997	2.00 m (6 ft 7 in)	92 kg (203 lb)	348 cm (137 in)	outside hitter
24	(Poland) Szymon Biniek	30 July 1995	1.88 m (6 ft 2 in)	80 kg (180 lb)	320 cm (130 in)	libero
26	(Poland) Rafał Szymura	29 August 1995	1.97 m (6 ft 6 in)	102 kg (225 lb)	345 cm (136 in)	outside hitter

== 2019/2020 ==
The following is the Jastrzębski Węgiel roster in the 2019–20 PlusLiga.

Head coach:	(Italy) Roberto Santilli (2018 – Nov 2019) / (Serbia) Slobodan Kovač (Dec 2019 – 2020)
Assistants:	(Poland) Leszek Dejewski, (Australia) Luke Reynolds

No.	Name	Date of birth	Height	Weight	Spike	Position
1	(Germany) Christian Fromm	15 August 1990	2.04 m (6 ft 8 in)	103 kg (227 lb)	350 cm (140 in)	outside hitter
2	(Brazil) Raphael Margarido	28 April 1983	1.86 m (6 ft 1 in)	86 kg (190 lb)	315 cm (124 in)	setter
3	(Poland) Jakub Popiwczak	17 April 1996	1.80 m (5 ft 11 in)	78 kg (172 lb)	320 cm (130 in)	libero
4	(Puerto Rico) Arturo Iglesias	22 November 1995	1.93 m (6 ft 4 in)	90 kg (200 lb)	340 cm (130 in)	setter
5	(Poland) Jakub Bucki	13 August 1988	1.97 m (6 ft 6 in)	94 kg (207 lb)	327 cm (129 in)	opposite
6	(Poland) Dawid Konarski	31 August 1989	1.98 m (6 ft 6 in)	101 kg (223 lb)	355 cm (140 in)	opposite
7	(Poland) Paweł Rusek	21 January 1983	1.83 m (6 ft 0 in)	76 kg (168 lb)	315 cm (124 in)	libero
8	(France) Julien Lyneel	15 April 1990	1.92 m (6 ft 4 in)	85 kg (187 lb)	345 cm (136 in)	outside hitter
9	(Canada) Graham Vigrass	17 June 1989	2.05 m (6 ft 9 in)	94 kg (207 lb)	352 cm (139 in)	middle blocker
10	(Germany) Lukas Kampa (C)	29 November 1986	1.93 m (6 ft 4 in)	90 kg (200 lb)	340 cm (130 in)	setter
11	(Poland) Dominik Depowski	27 October 1995	2.00 m (6 ft 7 in)	95 kg (209 lb)	348 cm (137 in)	outside hitter
13	(Poland) Yuriy Gladyr	8 July 1984	2.02 m (6 ft 8 in)	96 kg (212 lb)	360 cm (140 in)	middle blocker
15	(Poland) Michał Szalacha	15 January 1994	2.02 m (6 ft 8 in)	97 kg (214 lb)	365 cm (144 in)	middle blocker
16	(Poland) Piotr Hain	26 February 1991	2.07 m (6 ft 9 in)	91 kg (201 lb)	343 cm (135 in)	middle blocker
21	(Poland) Tomasz Fornal	31 August 1997	2.00 m (6 ft 7 in)	92 kg (203 lb)	348 cm (137 in)	outside hitter

== 2018/2019 ==
The following is the Jastrzębski Węgiel roster in the 2018–19 PlusLiga.

Head coach:	(Italy) Ferdinando De Giorgi (Jan 2018 – Dec 2018) / (Italy) Roberto Santilli (Dec 2018 – Nov 2019)
Assistant:	(Poland) Leszek Dejewski

No.	Name	Date of birth	Height	Weight	Spike	Position
1	(Germany) Christian Fromm	16 August 1990	2.04 m (6 ft 8 in)	103 kg (227 lb)	350 cm (140 in)	outside hitter
3	(Poland) Jakub Popiwczak	17 April 1996	1.80 m (5 ft 11 in)	78 kg (172 lb)	320 cm (130 in)	libero
4	(Poland) Grzegorz Kosok (C)	2 March 1986	2.05 m (6 ft 9 in)	95 kg (209 lb)	350 cm (140 in)	middle blocker
5	(Poland) Jakub Bucki	13 August 1988	1.97 m (6 ft 6 in)	94 kg (207 lb)	327 cm (129 in)	opposite
6	(Poland) Dawid Konarski	31 August 1989	1.98 m (6 ft 6 in)	101 kg (223 lb)	355 cm (140 in)	opposite
7	(Poland) Paweł Rusek	21 January 1983	1.83 m (6 ft 0 in)	76 kg (168 lb)	315 cm (124 in)	libero
8	(France) Julien Lyneel	15 April 1990	1.92 m (6 ft 4 in)	85 kg (187 lb)	345 cm (136 in)	outside hitter
9	(Poland) Dawid Gunia	1 January 1987	2.03 m (6 ft 8 in)	101 kg (223 lb)	348 cm (137 in)	middle blocker
10	(Germany) Lukas Kampa	29 November 1986	1.93 m (6 ft 4 in)	90 kg (200 lb)	340 cm (130 in)	setter
11	(Poland) Jakub Turski	6 September 1998	2.02 m (6 ft 8 in)	94 kg (207 lb)	355 cm (140 in)	middle blocker
13	(Cuba) Salvador Hidalgo Oliva	27 December 1985	1.95 m (6 ft 5 in)	98 kg (216 lb)	355 cm (140 in)	outside hitter
15	(Poland) Nikodem Wolański	19 January 1994	1.98 m (6 ft 6 in)	81 kg (179 lb)	335 cm (132 in)	setter
16	(Poland) Potr Hain	26 February 1994	2.07 m (6 ft 9 in)	91 kg (201 lb)	343 cm (135 in)	middle blocker
18	(Poland) Michał Szalacha	15 January 1994	2.02 m (6 ft 8 in)	97 kg (214 lb)	365 cm (144 in)	middle blocker
55	(Poland) Wojciech Ferens	5 April 1991	1.94 m (6 ft 4 in)	96 kg (212 lb)	358 cm (141 in)	outside hitter

== 2017/2018 ==
The following is the Jastrzębski Węgiel roster in the 2017–18 PlusLiga.

Head coach:	(Australia) Mark Lebedew (2015 – Jan 2018) / (Italy) Ferdinando De Giorgi (Jan 2018 – Dec 2018)
Assistant:	(Poland) Leszek Dejewski

No.	Name	Date of birth	Height	Weight	Spike	Position
1	(Poland) Patryk Strzeżek (C)	19 November 1989	2.03 m (6 ft 8 in)	99 kg (218 lb)	355 cm (140 in)	opposite
2	(Poland) Maciej Muzaj	21 May 1994	2.08 m (6 ft 10 in)	88 kg (194 lb)	379 cm (149 in)	opposite
3	(Poland) Jakub Popiwczak	17 April 1996	1.80 m (5 ft 11 in)	78 kg (172 lb)	320 cm (130 in)	libero
4	(Poland) Grzegorz Kosok (C)	2 March 1986	2.05 m (6 ft 9 in)	95 kg (209 lb)	350 cm (140 in)	middle blocker
5	(Sweden) Dardan Lushtaku	5 February 1992	1.90 m (6 ft 3 in)	72 kg (159 lb)	348 cm (137 in)	setter
6	(Poland) Damian Boruch	14 December 1989	2.09 m (6 ft 10 in)	99 kg (218 lb)	349 cm (137 in)	middle blocker
7	(Argentina) Rodrigo Quiroga	23 March 1987	1.91 m (6 ft 3 in)	87 kg (192 lb)	345 cm (136 in)	outside hitter
8	(Poland) Marcin Ernastowicz	31 July 1997	1.90 m (6 ft 3 in)	80 kg (180 lb)	345 cm (136 in)	outside hitter
9	(Canada) Jason DeRocco	19 September 1989	2.01 m (6 ft 7 in)	94 kg (207 lb)	348 cm (137 in)	outside hitter
10	(Germany) Lukas Kampa	29 November 1986	1.93 m (6 ft 4 in)	90 kg (200 lb)	340 cm (130 in)	setter
11	(Poland) Wojciech Sobala	12 May 1988	2.07 m (6 ft 9 in)	96 kg (212 lb)	355 cm (140 in)	middle blocker
12	(Poland) Karol Gdowski	10 February 1999	1.83 m (6 ft 0 in)	85 kg (187 lb)	320 cm (130 in)	libero
13	(Cuba) Salvador Hidalgo Oliva	27 December 1985	1.95 m (6 ft 5 in)	98 kg (216 lb)	355 cm (140 in)	outside hitter
17	(Poland) Jakub Turski	6 September 1998	2.02 m (6 ft 8 in)	94 kg (207 lb)	355 cm (140 in)	middle blocker

== 2016/2017 ==
The following is the Jastrzębski Węgiel roster in the 2016–17 PlusLiga.

Head coach:	(Australia) Mark Lebedew
Assistants:	(Poland) Leszek Dejewski, (Australia) Luke Reynolds

No.	Name	Date of birth	Height	Weight	Spike	Position
1	(Poland) Patryk Strzeżek (C)	19 November 1989	2.03 m (6 ft 8 in)	99 kg (218 lb)	355 cm (140 in)	opposite
2	(Poland) Maciej Muzaj	21 May 1994	2.08 m (6 ft 10 in)	88 kg (194 lb)	379 cm (149 in)	opposite
3	(Poland) Jakub Popiwczak	17 April 1996	1.80 m (5 ft 11 in)	78 kg (172 lb)	320 cm (130 in)	libero
4	(Poland) Grzegorz Kosok	2 March 1986	2.05 m (6 ft 9 in)	95 kg (209 lb)	350 cm (140 in)	middle blocker
5	(Poland) Radosław Gil	25 January 1997	1.91 m (6 ft 3 in)	82 kg (181 lb)	332 cm (131 in)	setter
6	(Poland) Damian Boruch	14 December 1989	2.09 m (6 ft 10 in)	99 kg (218 lb)	349 cm (137 in)	middle blocker
7	(United States) Scott Touzinsky	22 April 1982	1.95 m (6 ft 5 in)	94 kg (207 lb)	338 cm (133 in)	outside hitter
8	(Poland) Marcin Ernastowicz	31 July 1997	1.90 m (6 ft 3 in)	80 kg (180 lb)	345 cm (136 in)	outside hitter
9	(Canada) Jason DeRocco	19 September 1989	2.01 m (6 ft 7 in)	94 kg (207 lb)	348 cm (137 in)	outside hitter
10	(Germany) Lukas Kampa	29 November 1986	1.93 m (6 ft 4 in)	90 kg (200 lb)	340 cm (130 in)	setter
11	(Poland) Wojciech Sobala	12 May 1988	2.07 m (6 ft 9 in)	96 kg (212 lb)	355 cm (140 in)	middle blocker
12	(Poland) Karol Gdowski	10 February 1999	1.83 m (6 ft 0 in)	85 kg (187 lb)	320 cm (130 in)	libero
13	(Cuba) Salvador Hidalgo Oliva	27 December 1985	1.95 m (6 ft 5 in)	98 kg (216 lb)	355 cm (140 in)	outside hitter
16	(Germany) Sebastian Schwarz	2 October 1985	1.97 m (6 ft 6 in)	96 kg (212 lb)	350 cm (140 in)	outside hitter
17	(Poland) Marcin Bachmatiuk	17 May 1992	2.05 m (6 ft 9 in)	91 kg (201 lb)	345 cm (136 in)	middle blocker

== 2015/2016 ==
The following is the Jastrzębski Węgiel roster in the 2015–16 PlusLiga.

Head coach:	(Australia) Mark Lebedew
Assistant:	(Poland) Leszek Dejewski

No.	Name	Date of birth	Height	Weight	Spike	Position
1	(Poland) Patryk Strzeżek	19 November 1989	2.03 m (6 ft 8 in)	99 kg (218 lb)	355 cm (140 in)	opposite
2	(Poland) Maciej Muzaj	21 May 1994	2.08 m (6 ft 10 in)	88 kg (194 lb)	379 cm (149 in)	opposite
3	(Poland) Jakub Popiwczak	17 April 1996	1.80 m (5 ft 11 in)	78 kg (172 lb)	320 cm (130 in)	libero
5	(Poland) Radosław Gil	25 January 1997	1.91 m (6 ft 3 in)	82 kg (181 lb)	332 cm (131 in)	setter
6	(Poland) Damian Boruch	14 December 1989	2.09 m (6 ft 10 in)	99 kg (218 lb)	349 cm (137 in)	middle blocker
7	(Slovakia) Michal Masný (C)	14 August 1979	1.82 m (6 ft 0 in)	75 kg (165 lb)	330 cm (130 in)	setter
9	(Canada) Jason DeRocco	19 September 1989	2.01 m (6 ft 7 in)	94 kg (207 lb)	348 cm (137 in)	outside hitter
10	(Canada) Toontje Van Lankvelt	1 July 1984	1.97 m (6 ft 6 in)	91 kg (201 lb)	347 cm (137 in)	outside hitter
11	(Poland) Wojciech Sobala	12 May 1988	2.07 m (6 ft 9 in)	96 kg (212 lb)	355 cm (140 in)	middle blocker
12	(Poland) Konrad Formela	8 March 1995	1.94 m (6 ft 4 in)	86 kg (190 lb)	345 cm (136 in)	outside hitter
16	(Poland) Piotr Hain	26 February 1991	2.07 m (6 ft 9 in)	91 kg (201 lb)	343 cm (135 in)	middle blocker
17	(Israel) Alexander Shafranovich	2 April 1983	1.90 m (6 ft 3 in)	90 kg (200 lb)	351 cm (138 in)	outside hitter
18	(Poland) Adrian Mihułka	10 July 1989	1.82 m (6 ft 0 in)	81 kg (179 lb)	325 cm (128 in)	libero

== 2014/2015 ==
The following is the Jastrzębski Węgiel roster in the 2014–15 PlusLiga.

Head coach:	(Italy) Roberto Piazza
Assistant:	(Poland) Leszek Dejewski

No.	Name	Date of birth	Height	Weight	Spike	Position
1	(Italy) Michał Łasko (C)	11 March 1981	2.02 m (6 ft 8 in)	98 kg (216 lb)	365 cm (144 in)	opposite
2	(Poland) Krzysztof Gierczyński	23 January 1976	1.93 m (6 ft 4 in)	87 kg (192 lb)	335 cm (132 in)	outside hitter
3	(Poland) Jakub Popiwczak	17 April 1996	1.90 m (6 ft 3 in)	78 kg (172 lb)	320 cm (130 in)	libero
4	(Germany) Denis Kaliberda	24 June 1990	1.93 m (6 ft 4 in)	90 kg (200 lb)	345 cm (136 in)	outside hitter
5	(Slovenia) Alen Pajenk	23 April 1986	2.03 m (6 ft 8 in)	94 kg (207 lb)	352 cm (139 in)	middle blocker
6	(Poland) Mateusz Malinowski	6 May 1992	1.98 m (6 ft 6 in)	93 kg (205 lb)	349 cm (137 in)	opposite
7	(Slovakia) Michal Masny	14 August 1979	1.82 m (6 ft 0 in)	75 kg (165 lb)	330 cm (130 in)	setter
8	(Poland) Mateusz Kańczok	3 June 1993	2.04 m (6 ft 8 in)	96 kg (212 lb)	359 cm (141 in)	middle blocker
9	(Poland) Patryk Czarnowski	1 November 1985	2.04 m (6 ft 8 in)	98 kg (216 lb)	365 cm (144 in)	middle blocker
10	(Poland) Grzegorz Kosok	2 March 1986	2.05 m (6 ft 9 in)	95 kg (209 lb)	350 cm (140 in)	middle blocker
11	(Poland) Zbigniew Bartman	4 May 1987	1.98 m (6 ft 6 in)	97 kg (214 lb)	363 cm (143 in)	outside hitter
12	(Poland) Konrad Formela	8 March 1995	1.94 m (6 ft 4 in)	86 kg (190 lb)	345 cm (136 in)	outside hitter
14	(France) Guillaume Quesque	29 April 1989	2.03 m (6 ft 8 in)	92 kg (203 lb)	345 cm (136 in)	outside hitter
15	(Greece) Dmytro Filippov	4 December 1990	1.98 m (6 ft 6 in)	88 kg (194 lb)	340 cm (130 in)	setter
18	(Poland) Damian Wojtaszek	7 September 1988	1.80 m (5 ft 11 in)	79 kg (174 lb)	330 cm (130 in)	libero

== 2013/2014 ==
The following is the Jastrzębski Węgiel roster in the 2013–14 PlusLiga.

Head coach:	(Italy) Lorenzo Bernardi
Assistant:	(Italy) Massimo Caponeri

No.	Name	Date of birth	Height	Weight	Spike	Position
1	(Italy) Michał Łasko (C)	11 March 1981	2.02 m (6 ft 8 in)	98 kg (216 lb)	365 cm (144 in)	opposite
2	(Poland) Krzysztof Gierczyński	23 January 1976	1.93 m (6 ft 4 in)	87 kg (192 lb)	335 cm (132 in)	outside hitter
3	(Poland) Jakub Popiwczak	17 April 1996	1.80 m (5 ft 11 in)	78 kg (172 lb)	320 cm (130 in)	libero
4	(Poland) Radosław Sterna	26 January 1995	2.03 m (6 ft 8 in)	90 kg (200 lb)	0 cm (0 in)	middle blocker
5	(Slovenia) Alen Pajenk	23 April 1986	2.03 m (6 ft 8 in)	94 kg (207 lb)	352 cm (139 in)	middle blocker
6	(Poland) Mateusz Malinowski	6 May 1992	1.98 m (6 ft 6 in)	93 kg (205 lb)	349 cm (137 in)	opposite
7	(Slovakia) Michal Masny	14 August 1979	1.82 m (6 ft 0 in)	75 kg (165 lb)	330 cm (130 in)	setter
8	(Poland) Konrad Formela	8 March 1995	1.94 m (6 ft 4 in)	86 kg (190 lb)	345 cm (136 in)	outside hitter
9	(Poland) Patryk Czarnowski	1 November 1985	2.04 m (6 ft 8 in)	98 kg (216 lb)	365 cm (144 in)	middle blocker
10	(Belgium) Simon Van de Voorde	19 December 1989	2.08 m (6 ft 10 in)	85 kg (187 lb)	348 cm (137 in)	middle blocker
11	(Poland) (Canada) Thomas Jarmoc	19 April 1987	1.98 m (6 ft 6 in)	89 kg (196 lb)	359 cm (141 in)	outside hitter
12	(Poland) Sebastian Matula	9 April 1995	0 m (0 in)	0 kg (0 lb)	0 cm (0 in)	setter
13	(Poland) Michał Kubiak	23 February 1988	1.92 m (6 ft 4 in)	87 kg (192 lb)	340 cm (130 in)	outside hitter
14	(Poland) Bartosz Kwolek	17 July 1997	1.93 m (6 ft 4 in)	93 kg (205 lb)	343 cm (135 in)	outside hitter
15	(Greece) Dmytro Filippov	4 December 1990	1.98 m (6 ft 6 in)	88 kg (194 lb)	340 cm (130 in)	setter
16	(Poland) (France) Nicolas Marechal	4 March 1987	1.98 m (6 ft 6 in)	94 kg (207 lb)	335 cm (132 in)	outside hitter
17	(Netherlands) Rob Bontje	12 May 1981	2.06 m (6 ft 9 in)	94 kg (207 lb)	366 cm (144 in)	middle blocker
18	(Poland) Damian Wojtaszek	7 September 1988	1.80 m (5 ft 11 in)	79 kg (174 lb)	330 cm (130 in)	libero
19	(Poland) Krzysztof Pustelnik	11 October 1995	1.95 m (6 ft 5 in)	88 kg (194 lb)	0 cm (0 in)	opposite

== 2012/2013 ==
The following is the Jastrzębski Węgiel roster in the 2012–13 PlusLiga.

Head coach:	(Italy) Lorenzo Bernardi
Assistant:	(Italy) Juan Manuel De Palma

No.	Name	Date of birth	Height	Weight	Spike	Position
1	(Italy) Michał Łasko (C)	11 March 1981	2.02 m (6 ft 8 in)	98 kg (216 lb)	365 cm (144 in)	opposite
2	(Poland) Krzysztof Gierczyński	23 January 1976	1.93 m (6 ft 4 in)	87 kg (192 lb)	335 cm (132 in)	outside hitter
5	(Portugal) Tiago Violas	27 March 1989	1.93 m (6 ft 4 in)	85 kg (187 lb)	326 cm (128 in)	setter
6	(Poland) Mateusz Malinowski	6 May 1992	1.98 m (6 ft 6 in)	93 kg (205 lb)	349 cm (137 in)	outside hitter
7	(Italy) Matteo Martino	28 January 1987	1.97 m (6 ft 6 in)	84 kg (185 lb)	355 cm (140 in)	outside hitter
8	(Poland) Łukasz Polański	29 January 1989	2.05 m (6 ft 9 in)	94 kg (207 lb)	352 cm (139 in)	middle blocker
9	(Poland) Patryk Czarnowski	1 November 1985	2.04 m (6 ft 8 in)	98 kg (216 lb)	365 cm (144 in)	middle blocker
10	(Germany) Simon Tischer	24 April 1982	1.94 m (6 ft 4 in)	89 kg (196 lb)	346 cm (136 in)	setter
12	(United States) Russell Holmes	1 July 1982	2.05 m (6 ft 9 in)	95 kg (209 lb)	352 cm (139 in)	middle blocker
13	(Poland) Michał Kubiak	23 February 1988	1.92 m (6 ft 4 in)	87 kg (192 lb)	340 cm (130 in)	outside hitter
16	(Poland) Radosław Zbierski	14 April 1988	0 m (0 in)	0 kg (0 lb)	0 cm (0 in)	outside hitter
17	(Netherlands) Rob Bontje	12 May 1981	2.06 m (6 ft 9 in)	94 kg (207 lb)	366 cm (144 in)	middle blocker
18	(Poland) Damian Wojtaszek	7 September 1988	1.80 m (5 ft 11 in)	79 kg (174 lb)	330 cm (130 in)	libero

== 2011/2012 ==
The following is the Jastrzębski Węgiel roster in the 2011–12 PlusLiga.

Head coach:	(Italy) Lorenzo Bernardi
Assistant:	(Italy) Juan Manuel De Palma

No.	Name	Date of birth	Height	Weight	Spike	Position
1	(Italy) Michał Łasko (C)	11 March 1981	2.02 m (6 ft 8 in)	98 kg (216 lb)	365 cm (144 in)	opposite
2	(Brazil) Raphael Margarido	28 April 1983	1.86 m (6 ft 1 in)	86 kg (190 lb)	315 cm (124 in)	setter
3	(Brazil) Ashlei Nemer	26 November 1980	1.92 m (6 ft 4 in)	90 kg (200 lb)	343 cm (135 in)	outside hitter
5	(Portugal) Tiago Violas	27 March 1989	1.93 m (6 ft 4 in)	85 kg (187 lb)	326 cm (128 in)	setter
6	(Poland) Mateusz Malinowski	6 May 1992	1.98 m (6 ft 6 in)	93 kg (205 lb)	349 cm (137 in)	opposite
7	(Poland) Paweł Rusek	21 January 1983	1.83 m (6 ft 0 in)	76 kg (168 lb)	315 cm (124 in)	libero
8	(Poland) Łukasz Polański	29 January 1989	2.05 m (6 ft 9 in)	94 kg (207 lb)	352 cm (139 in)	middle blocker
9	(Poland) Zbigniew Bartman	4 May 1987	1.98 m (6 ft 6 in)	97 kg (214 lb)	363 cm (143 in)	outside hitter
10	(Poland) Bartosz Gawryszewski	22 August 1985	2.02 m (6 ft 8 in)	89 kg (196 lb)	348 cm (137 in)	middle blocker
11	(United States) Brian Thorton	22 April 1985	1.90 m (6 ft 3 in)	83 kg (183 lb)	327 cm (129 in)	setter
13	(Poland) Michał Kubiak	23 February 1988	1.92 m (6 ft 4 in)	87 kg (192 lb)	340 cm (130 in)	outside hitter
14	(Poland) Bartosz Sufa	11 August 1987	1.86 m (6 ft 1 in)	85 kg (187 lb)	325 cm (128 in)	libero
15	(United States) Russell Holmes	1 July 1982	2.05 m (6 ft 9 in)	95 kg (209 lb)	352 cm (139 in)	middle blocker
17	(Netherlands) Rob Bontje	12 May 1981	2.06 m (6 ft 9 in)	94 kg (207 lb)	366 cm (144 in)	middle blocker
18	(Brazil) (Poland) Luciano Bozko	24 November 1978	1.98 m (6 ft 6 in)	90 kg (200 lb)	347 cm (137 in)	outside hitter

== 2010/2011 ==
The following is the Jastrzębski Węgiel roster in the 2010–11 PlusLiga.

Head coach:	(Italy) Lorenzo Bernardi
Assistants:	(Poland) Leszek Dejewski, (Slovakia) Miroslav Palgut

No.	Name	Date of birth	Height	Weight	Spike	Position
1	(Poland) Adam Nowik	23 April 1975	2.06 m (6 ft 9 in)	96 kg (212 lb)	350 cm (140 in)	middle blocker
2	(Slovakia) Lukáš Diviš	20 February 1986	2.02 m (6 ft 8 in)	93 kg (205 lb)	357 cm (141 in)	outside hitter
3	(Poland) Grzegorz Łomacz (C)	1 October 1987	1.88 m (6 ft 2 in)	80 kg (180 lb)	336 cm (132 in)	setter
4	(Poland) Maciej Pawliński	2 February 1983	1.93 m (6 ft 4 in)	93 kg (205 lb)	340 cm (130 in)	outside hitter
5	(Australia) Igor Yudin	17 June 1987	1.98 m (6 ft 6 in)	80 kg (180 lb)	343 cm (135 in)	opposite
6	(Poland) Marcin Wika	9 November 1983	1.94 m (6 ft 4 in)	97 kg (214 lb)	340 cm (130 in)	outside hitter
7	(Poland) Paweł Rusek	21 January 1983	1.83 m (6 ft 0 in)	76 kg (168 lb)	315 cm (124 in)	libero
8	(Poland) Łukasz Polański	29 January 1989	2.05 m (6 ft 9 in)	94 kg (207 lb)	352 cm (139 in)	middle blocker
9	(Poland) Damian Dobosz	10 November 1992	0 m (0 in)	0 kg (0 lb)	0 cm (0 in)	outside hitter
10	(Poland) Bartosz Gawryszewski	22 August 1985	2.02 m (6 ft 8 in)	89 kg (196 lb)	348 cm (137 in)	middle blocker
11	(Poland) Mateusz Przybyła	12 April 1991	2.08 m (6 ft 10 in)	118 kg (260 lb)	354 cm (139 in)	middle blocker
12	(Poland) Grzegorz Pająk	1 January 1987	1.96 m (6 ft 5 in)	94 kg (207 lb)	349 cm (137 in)	setter
13	(Poland) Bartosz Sufa	11 August 1987	1.86 m (6 ft 1 in)	85 kg (187 lb)	325 cm (128 in)	libero
14	(Australia) Benjamin Hardy	21 September 1974	1.98 m (6 ft 6 in)	96 kg (212 lb)	340 cm (130 in)	outside hitter
15	(Poland) Adrian Buchowski	30 September 1991	1.94 m (6 ft 4 in)	94 kg (207 lb)	347 cm (137 in)	outside hitter
16	(Slovenia) Mitja Gasparini	26 June 1984	2.02 m (6 ft 8 in)	92 kg (203 lb)	355 cm (140 in)	opposite

== 2009/2010 ==
The following is the Jastrzębski Węgiel roster in the 2009–10 PlusLiga.

Head coach:	(Italy) Roberto Santilli
Assistant:	(Poland) Leszek Dejewski

No.	Name	Date of birth	Height	Weight	Spike	Position
1	(Poland) Adam Nowik	23 April 1975	2.06 m (6 ft 9 in)	96 kg (212 lb)	350 cm (140 in)	middle blocker
2	(Poland) Damian Dobosz	10 November 1992	0 m (0 in)	0 kg (0 lb)	0 cm (0 in)	outside hitter
3	(Poland) Grzegorz Łomacz (C)	1 October 1987	1.88 m (6 ft 2 in)	80 kg (180 lb)	336 cm (132 in)	setter
4	(Russia) Pavel Abramov	23 April 1979	1.96 m (6 ft 5 in)	90 kg (200 lb)	350 cm (140 in)	outside hitter
5	(Australia) Igor Yudin	17 June 1987	1.98 m (6 ft 6 in)	80 kg (180 lb)	343 cm (135 in)	opposite
6	(Poland) Sławomir Master	18 August 1983	2.04 m (6 ft 8 in)	91 kg (201 lb)	343 cm (135 in)	setter
7	(Poland) Paweł Rusek	21 January 1983	1.83 m (6 ft 0 in)	76 kg (168 lb)	315 cm (124 in)	libero
8	(Czech Republic) Marek Novotny	4 May 1978	2.02 m (6 ft 8 in)	91 kg (201 lb)	345 cm (136 in)	outside hitter
9	(Poland) Patryk Czarnowski	1 November 1985	2.04 m (6 ft 8 in)	98 kg (216 lb)	365 cm (144 in)	middle blocker
10	(Poland) Wojciech Sobala	12 May 1988	2.07 m (6 ft 9 in)	96 kg (212 lb)	355 cm (140 in)	middle blocker
11	(Poland) Sławomir Szczygieł	2 June 1978	2.02 m (6 ft 8 in)	101 kg (223 lb)	340 cm (130 in)	middle blocker
13	(Poland) Sebastian Pęcherz	12 December 1985	1.94 m (6 ft 4 in)	91 kg (201 lb)	341 cm (134 in)	outside hitter
14	(Australia) Benjamin Hardy	21 September 1974	1.98 m (6 ft 6 in)	96 kg (212 lb)	340 cm (130 in)	outside hitter
15	(Brazil) Pedro Azenha	23 March 1981	1.98 m (6 ft 6 in)	88 kg (194 lb)	341 cm (134 in)	opposite
18	(Turkey) Ali Alp Cayir	13 September 1981	1.96 m (6 ft 5 in)	92 kg (203 lb)	350 cm (140 in)	outside hitter

== 2008/2009 ==
The following is the Jastrzębski Węgiel roster in the 2008–09 PlusLiga.

Head coach:	(Italy) Roberto Santilli
Assistant:	(Poland) Leszek Dejewski

No.	Name	Date of birth	Height	Weight	Spike	Position
1	(Poland) Adam Nowik	23 April 1975	2.06 m (6 ft 9 in)	96 kg (212 lb)	350 cm (140 in)	middle blocker
2	(Netherlands) Nico Freriks	22 December 1981	1.92 m (6 ft 4 in)	85 kg (187 lb)	331 cm (130 in)	setter
3	(Poland) Grzegorz Łomacz	1 October 1987	1.88 m (6 ft 2 in)	80 kg (180 lb)	336 cm (132 in)	setter
4	(Poland) Wojciech Jurkiewicz	21 June 1977	2.05 m (6 ft 9 in)	100 kg (220 lb)	350 cm (140 in)	middle blocker
5	(Australia) Igor Yudin	17 June 1987	1.98 m (6 ft 6 in)	80 kg (180 lb)	343 cm (135 in)	outside hitter
7	(Poland) Paweł Rusek	21 January 1983	1.83 m (6 ft 0 in)	76 kg (168 lb)	315 cm (124 in)	libero
9	(Poland) Patryk Czarnowski	1 November 1985	2.04 m (6 ft 8 in)	98 kg (216 lb)	365 cm (144 in)	middle blocker
10	(Poland) Robert Prygiel (C)	17 April 1976	2.00 m (6 ft 7 in)	100 kg (220 lb)	350 cm (140 in)	opposite
11	(Poland) Marcin Grygiel	9 October 1978	1.99 m (6 ft 6 in)	92 kg (203 lb)	345 cm (136 in)	opposite
13	(Poland) Sebastian Pęcherz	12 December 1985	1.94 m (6 ft 4 in)	91 kg (201 lb)	341 cm (134 in)	outside hitter
14	(Australia) Benjamin Hardy	21 September 1974	1.98 m (6 ft 6 in)	96 kg (212 lb)	340 cm (130 in)	outside hitter
15	(France) Guillaume Samica	28 September 1981	1.97 m (6 ft 6 in)	88 kg (194 lb)	350 cm (140 in)	outside hitter
18	(Brazil) Rafael De Souza Lins	1 April 1983	1.93 m (6 ft 4 in)	87 kg (192 lb)	338 cm (133 in)	outside hitter
