= 2013 in volleyball =

The following were the events of Volleyball for the year 2013 throughout the world.

== Beach volleyball ==
- April 23 – December 15: 2013 FIVB Beach Volleyball Open Series
  - April 23 – 28 at (China) Fuzhou
    - Men's winners: (United States) Sean Rosenthal and Philip Dalhausser
    - Women's winners: (China) Xue Chen and Zhang Xi
  - July 23 – 28 at (Russia) Anapa
    - Men's winners: (Russia) Konstantin Semenov and Yaroslav Koshkarev
    - Women's winners: (Russia) Evgenia Ukolova and Ekaterina Khomyakova
  - October 29 – November 3 at (Thailand) Phuket (women's teams only)
    - Winners: (China) Xue Chen and Xia Xinyi
  - December 11 – 15 at (South Africa) Durban
    - Men's winners: (Latvia) Jānis Šmēdiņš and Aleksandrs Samoilovs
    - Women's winners: (China) Xue Chen and Xia Xinyi
- April 30 – October 27: FIVB Beach Volleyball World Tour
  - April 30 – May 5 at (China) Shanghai
    - Men's winners: (United States) Jacob Gibb and Casey Patterson
    - Women's winners: (Brazil) Talita Antunes and Taiana Lima
  - May 22 – 26 at (Argentina) Corrientes
    - Men's winners: (Latvia) Jānis Šmēdiņš and Aleksandrs Samoilovs
    - Women's winners: (Netherlands) Madelein Meppelink and Sophie van Gestel
  - June 11 – 16 at (Netherlands) The Hague
    - Men's winners: (Brazil) Pedro Solberg Salgado and Bruno Oscar Schmidt
    - Women's winners: (Brazil) Talita Antunes and Taiana Lima
  - June 18 – 23 at (Italy) Rome
    - Men's winners: (United States) Phil Dalhausser and Sean Rosenthal
    - Women's winners: (Brazil) Talita Antunes and Taiana Lima
  - July 9 – 14 at (Switzerland) Gstaad
    - Men's winners: (Brazil) Ricardo Santos and Álvaro Morais Filho
    - Women's winners: (China) Xue Chen and Zhang Xi
  - July 22 – 27 at (United States) Long Beach
    - Men's winners: (United States) Sean Rosenthal and Phil Dalhausser
    - Women's winners: (Brazil) Taiana Lima and Talita Antunes
  - August 6 – 11 at (Germany) Berlin
    - Men's winners: (Brazil) Vítor Gonçalves Felipe and Evandro Gonçalves Oliveira Júnior
    - Women's winners: (Brazil) Taiana Lima and Talita Antunes
  - August 21 – 25 at (Russia) Moscow
    - Men's winners: (Latvia) Jānis Šmēdiņš and Aleksandrs Samoilovs
    - Women's winners: (Brazil) Maria Clara Salgado Rufino and Carolina Solberg Salgado
  - October 8 – 13 at (Brazil) São Paulo
    - Men's winners: (Brazil) Pedro Solberg Salgado and Bruno Oscar Schmidt
    - Women's winners: (United States) Kerri Walsh and April Ross
  - October 22 – 27 at (China) Xiamen
    - Men's winners: (Brazil) Alison Cerutti and Vítor Gonçalves Felipe
    - Women's winners: (United States) Kerri Walsh and April Ross
- May 29 – June 2: 2013 FIVB Beach Volleyball World Cup Final at (Brazil) Campinas
  - Men's winners: (Brazil) Alison Cerutti and Emanuel Rego
  - Women's winners: (Brazil) Maria Antonelli and Talita Antunes
- June 6 – 9: 2013 FIVB Beach Volleyball U23 World Championships at (Poland) Mysłowice
  - Men's winners: (Poland) Piotr Kantor and Bartosz Losiak
  - Women's winners: (Germany) Victoria Bieneck and Isabell Schneider
- June 20 – 23: 2013 FIVB Beach Volleyball U21 World Championships at (Croatia) Umag
  - Men's winners: (Brazil) Gustavo Albrecht Carvalhaes and Allison Cittadin Francioni
  - Women's winners: (Poland) Katarzyna Kociolek and Jagoda Gruszczynska
- July 1 – 7: 2013 Beach Volleyball World Championships in (Poland) Stare Jabłonki
  - Men's winners: (Netherlands) Alexander Brouwer and Robert Meeuwsen
  - Women's winners: (China) Xue Chen and Xi Zhang
- July 11 – 14: 2013 FIVB Beach Volleyball U19 World Championships at (Portugal) Porto
  - Men's winners: (Germany) Moritz Reichert and Clemens Wickler
  - Women's winners: (Brazil) Eduarda Santos Lisboa and TAINÁ SILVA BIGI

== Volleyball ==
- Cev Women's Champions League. October 2012 – March 2013. Final Four in Istanbul, Turkey
  - (Turkey) VakıfBank gained the second European title against (Azerbaijan) Rabita Baku. MVP: (Serbia) Jovana Brakočević.
- Cev Champions League. October 2012 – March 2013. Final Four in Omsk, Russia.
  - (Russia) Lokomotiv Novosibirsk edged (Italy) Bre Banca Cuneo by the score of 3–2 to win their first European crown. MVP: (Sweden) Marcus Nilsson
- May 31 – July 21: 2013 FIVB Volleyball World League (final round will take place in (Argentina) Mar del Plata)
  - Champions: Russia; Second: Brazil; Third: Italy
- June 21 – 30: 2013 FIVB Women's Junior World Championship in (Czech Republic) Brno
  - Champions: China; Second: Japan; Third: Brazil
- June 27 – July 7: 2013 FIVB Boys Youth World Championship in (Mexico) Tijuana and Mexicali
  - Champions: Russia; Second: China; Third: Poland
- July 26 – August 4: 2013 FIVB Girls Youth World Championship in (Thailand) Nakhon Ratchasima
  - Champions: China; Second: United States; Third: Brazil
- August 28 – September 1: 2013 FIVB World Grand Prix (final round will take place in (Japan) Sapporo)
  - Champions: Brazil; Second: China; Third: Serbia. 9th title for Brazil.
- August 22 – September 1: 2013 FIVB Men's Junior World Championship in (Turkey) Ankara and İzmir
  - Champions: Russia; Second: Brazil; Third: Italy.
- September 6 – 14: 2013 Women's European Volleyball Championship in Germany and Switzerland
  - Champions: Russia; Second: Germany; Third: Belgium. 18th title for Russia.
- September 20 – 29: 2013 Men's European Volleyball Championship in Poland and Denmark
  - Champions: Russia; Second: Italy; Third: Serbia. 13th title for Russia.
- October 5 – 12: 2013 FIVB Women's U23 Volleyball World Championship in Mexico
  - Champions: China; Second: Dominican Republic; Third: Japan. First title.
- October 6 – 13: 2013 FIVB Men's U23 Volleyball World Championship in Brazil
  - Champions: Brazil; Second: Serbia; Third: Russia. First title.
- November 12 – 17: 2013 FIVB Women's World Grand Champions Cup for Women in Japan
  - Champions: Brazil; Second: United States; Third: Japan. Second title.
- November 19 – 24: 2013 FIVB World Grand Champions Cup for Men in Japan
  - Champions: Brazil; Second: Russia; Third: Italy. Fourth title.

== Volleyball Hall of Fame ==
- Class of 2013:
  - Vyacheslav Zaytsev
  - Natalie Cook
  - Caren Kemner
