= 2011–12 CEV Cup =

- League: CEV Cup
- Sport: Volleyball
- Duration: 18 October 2011 – 1 April 2012

Finals
- Champions: (Russia) Dynamo Moscow
- Runners-up: (Poland) Asseco Resovia

CEV Cup seasons
- ← 2010–11 2012–13 →

The 2011–12 CEV Cup was the 40th edition of the European CEV Cup volleyball club tournament.

Russian club Dynamo Moscow beat Polish club Asseco Resovia in both final matches and won the tournament for the first time.

== Participating teams ==
Country	Number of teams	Teams
Austria	1	SK Posojilnica Aich-Dob
Belgium	2	Knack Randstad Roeselare, Aquacare Halen
Bosnia and Herzegovina	1	OK Kakanj
Croatia	2	Mladost Zagreb, Mladost Marina Kaštela
Cyprus	1	Anorthosis Famagusta
Estonia	1	VK Selver Tallinn
Finland	2	Isku Volley Tampere, Lakkapää Rovaniemi
France	2	Arago de Sète, AS Cannes
Germany	1	Berlin Recycling Volleys
Greece	2	G.C. Lamia, Iraklis Thessaloniki
Israel	1	Maccabi Tel Aviv
Italy	1	Acqua Paradiso Monza
Montenegro	1	OK Budućnost Podgorica
Netherlands	1	Draisma Dynamo Apeldoorn
Poland	2	Asseco Resovia, Tytan AZS Częstochowa
Romania	3	Dinamo București, Stiinta Explorari Baia Mare, Remat Zalău
Russia	2	Dynamo Moscow, Belogorie Belgorod
Spain	1	Unicaja Almería
Serbia	1	Crvena Zvezda Beograd
Slovenia	2	Calcit Kamnik, ACH Volley Ljubljana
Switzerland	2	Seat Volley Näfels, Lausane UC
Turkey	3	Halkbank Ankara, İstanbul BBSK, Fenerbahçe Istanbul
Ukraine	1	Lokomotyv Kharkiv

== Main phase ==
=== 16th Finals ===
Team 1	Agg.	Team 2	1st leg	2nd leg	Golden Set
Acqua Paradiso Monza (Italy)	6–0	(Finland) Lakkapää Rovaniemi	3–0	3–0	
Seat Volley Näfels (Switzerland)	5–5	(Croatia) Mladost Zagreb	2–3	3–2	15–9
Berlin Recycling Volleys (Germany)	6–0	(Cyprus) Anorthosis Famagusta	3–0	3–0	
İstanbul BBSK (Turkey)	6–1	(Spain) Unicaja Almería	3–0	3–1	
Arago de Sète (France)	6–4	(Romania) Dinamo București	3–2	3–2	
VK Selver Tallinn (Estonia)	2–6	(Serbia) Crvena Zvezda Beograd	2–3	0–3	
Draisma Dynamo Apeldoorn (Netherlands)	5–3	(Croatia) Mladost Marina Kaštela	3–0	2–3	
Lausane UC (Switzerland)	2–6	(Poland) Asseco Resovia	2–3	0–3	
Maccabi Tel Aviv (Israel)	3–3	(Greece) G.C. Lamia	3–0	0–3	11–15
OK Kakanj (Bosnia and Herzegovina)	3–6	(Montenegro) OK Budućnost Podgorica	2–3	1–3	
Calcit Kamnik (Slovenia)	3–3	(Belgium) Aquacare Halen	3–0	0–3	12–15
Isku Volley Tampere (Finland)	2–6	(Belgium) Knack Randstad Roeselare	0–3	2–3	
Halkbank Ankara (Turkey)	6–0	(Poland) Tytan AZS Częstochowa	3–0	3–0	
AS Cannes (France)	4–4	(Austria) SK Posojilnica Aich-Dob	3–1	1–3	15–7
Stiinta Explorari Baia Mare (Romania)	0–6	(Russia) Belogorie Belgorod	0–3	0–3	
Dynamo Moscow (Russia)	6–2	(Ukraine) Lokomotyv Kharkiv	3–0	3–2	

=== 8th Finals ===
Team 1	Agg.	Team 2	1st leg	2nd leg	Golden Set
Seat Volley Näfels (Switzerland)	0–6	(Italy) Acqua Paradiso Monza	0–3	0–3	
Berlin Recycling Volleys (Germany)	6–2	(Turkey) İstanbul BBSK	3–0	3–2	
Crvena Zvezda Beograd (Serbia)	2–6	(France) Arago de Sète	1–3	1–3	
Asseco Resovia (Poland)	6–0	(Netherlands) Draisma Dynamo Apeldoorn	3–0	3–0	
OK Budućnost Podgorica (Montenegro)	3–5	(Greece) G.C. Lamia	0–3	3–2	9–15
Aquacare Halen (Belgium)	1–6	(Belgium) Knack Randstad Roeselare	0–3	1–3	
Halkbank Ankara (Turkey)	6–1	(France) AS Cannes	3–0	3–1	
Belogorie Belgorod (Russia)	4–5	(Russia) Dynamo Moscow	3–2	1–3	12–15

=== 4th Finals ===
Team 1	Agg.	Team 2	1st leg	2nd leg
Acqua Paradiso Monza (Italy)	6–1	(Germany) Berlin Recycling Volleys	3–0	3–1
Arago de Sète (France)	1–6	(Poland) Asseco Resovia	1–3	0–3
Knack Randstad Roeselare (Belgium)	6–1	(Greece) G.C. Lamia	3–0	3–1
Halkbank Ankara (Turkey)	2–6	(Russia) Dynamo Moscow	0–3	2–3

== Challenge phase ==
Team 1	Agg.	Team 2	1st leg	2nd leg	Golden Set
Knack Randstad Roeselare (Belgium)	2–6	(Slovenia) ACH Volley Ljubljana	2–3	0–3	
Fenerbahçe Istanbul (Turkey)	4–5	(Poland) Asseco Resovia	3–2	1–3	12–15
Dynamo Moscow (Russia)	6–0	(Greece) Iraklis Thessaloniki	3–0	3–0	
Remat Zalău (Romania)	1–6	(Italy) Acqua Paradiso Monza	1–3	0–3	

=== First leg ===
Date	Time		Score		Set 1	Set 2	Set 3	Set 4	Set 5	Total	Report
1 Feb	20:30	Knack Randstad Roeselare (Belgium)	2–3	(Slovenia) ACH Volley Ljubljana	25–23	12–25	25–15	26–28	7–15	95–106	Report
31 Jan	19:30	Fenerbahçe Istanbul (Turkey)	3–2	(Poland) Asseco Resovia	28–17	22–25	23–25	25–19	15–10	113–96	Report
1 Feb	19:00	Dynamo Moscow (Russia)	3–0	(Greece) Iraklis Thessaloniki	25–17	25–17	25–22			75–56	Report
31 Jan	19:00	Remat Zalău (Romania)	1–3	(Italy) Acqua Paradiso Monza	24–26	25–21	18–25	23–25		90–97	Report

=== Second leg ===
Date	Time		Score		Set 1	Set 2	Set 3	Set 4	Set 5	Total	Report
8 Feb	18:00	ACH Volley Ljubljana (Slovenia)	3–0	(Belgium) Knack Randstad Roeselare	25–20	25–17	25–22			75–59	Report
8 Feb	18:00	Asseco Resovia (Poland)	3–1	(Turkey) Fenerbahçe Istanbul	25–23	23–25	29–27	25–23		102–98	Report
Golden set		Asseco Resovia (Poland)	15–13	(Turkey) Fenerbahçe Istanbul							
8 Feb	20:00	Iraklis Thessaloniki (Greece)	0–3	(Russia) Dynamo Moscow	18–25	21–25	21–25			60–75	Report
9 Feb	20:30	Acqua Paradiso Monza (Italy)	3–0	(Romania) Remat Zalău	25–20	25–12	25–20			75–52	Report

== Final phase ==
=== Semi finals ===
Team 1	Agg.	Team 2	1st leg	2nd leg	Golden Set
Asseco Resovia (Poland)	6–0	(Slovenia) ACH Volley Ljubljana	3–0	3–0	
Acqua Paradiso Monza (Italy)	4–5	(Russia) Dynamo Moscow	3–2	1–3	13–15

==== First leg ====
Date	Time		Score		Set 1	Set 2	Set 3	Set 4	Set 5	Total	Report
14 Mar	18:00	Asseco Resovia (Poland)	3–0	(Slovenia) ACH Volley Ljubljana	28–26	25–8	25–17			78–51	Report
14 Mar	20:30	Acqua Paradiso Monza (Italy)	3–2	(Russia) Dynamo Moscow	23–25	25–21	25–22	18–25	15–12	106–105	Report

==== Second leg ====
Date	Time		Score		Set 1	Set 2	Set 3	Set 4	Set 5	Total	Report
17 Mar	20:00	ACH Volley Ljubljana (Slovenia)	0–3	(Poland) Asseco Resovia	18–25	19–25	22–25			59–75	Report
18 Mar	18:00	Dynamo Moscow (Russia)	3–1	(Italy) Acqua Paradiso Monza	22–25	25–19	25–19	25–22		97–85	Report
Golden set		Dynamo Moscow (Russia)	15–13	(Italy) Acqua Paradiso Monza							

=== Final ===
==== First leg ====
Date	Time		Score		Set 1	Set 2	Set 3	Set 4	Set 5	Total	Report
28 Mar	17:30	Asseco Resovia (Poland)	2–3	(Russia) Dynamo Moscow	20–25	25–22	20–25	25–23	13–15	103–110	Report

==== Second leg ====
Date	Time		Score		Set 1	Set 2	Set 3	Set 4	Set 5	Total	Report
1 Apr	18:00	Dynamo Moscow (Russia)	3–2	(Poland) Asseco Resovia	28–30	25–22	26–24	24–26	15–9	118–111	Report

== Final standings ==
Rank	Team
1st place, gold medalist(s)	(Russia) Dynamo Moscow
2nd place, silver medalist(s)	(Poland) Asseco Resovia
Semifinalists	(Slovenia) ACH Volley Ljubljana
Semifinalists	(Italy) Acqua Paradiso Monza

2012 CEV Cup winner
(Russia)
Dynamo Moscow
1st title

Team Members
Alexander Markin, Hachatur Stepanyan, David Lee, Sergey Grankin, Nikolay Pavlov, Roman Bragin, Nikolay Kharitonov, Denis Kalinin, Péter Veres, Dmitry Shcherbinin, Pavel Kruglov, Valentin Bezrukov
Head coach
Yury Cherednik
