= Marcus Nilsson =

Marcus Nilsson may refer to:

- Marcus Nilsson (decathlete) (born 1991), Swedish athlete
- Marcus Nilsson (footballer) (born 1988), Swedish footballer
- Marcus Nilsson (ice hockey) (born 1991), Swedish ice hockey player
- Marcus Nilsson (volleyball) (born 1982), Swedish volleyball player

== See also ==
- Marcus Nilson (born 1978), Swedish ice hockey player
