= Gheorghe Crețu =

Romanian volleyball player and coach

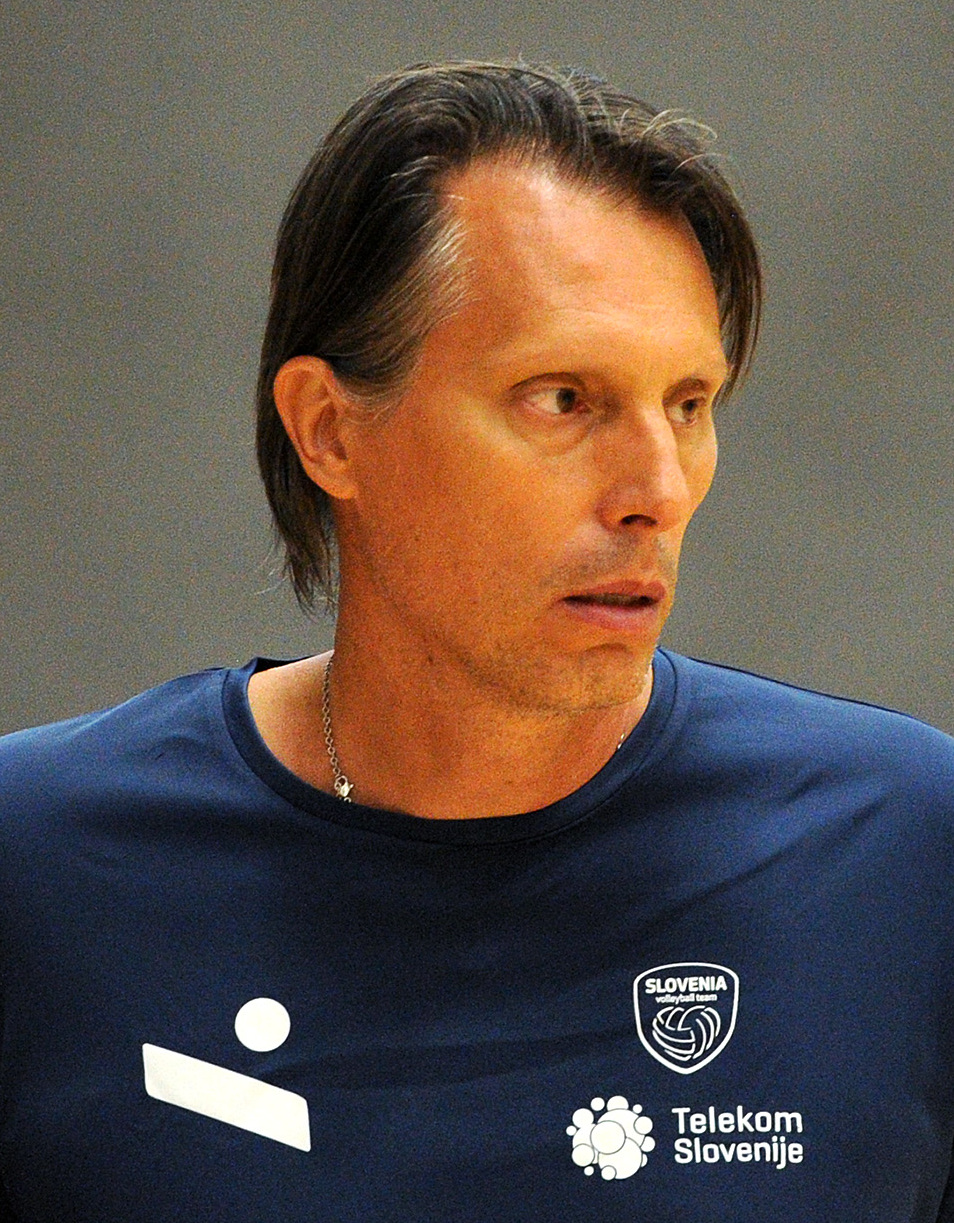
- Crețu in August 2022

Personal information
- Nickname: Gianni
- Born: 8 August 1968 (age 58); Constanța, Romania

Coaching information
- Current team: Serbia; Asseco Resovia
Previous teams coached
Years	Teams
1997–1998; 1998–1999; 1999; 2000–2001; 2001–2003; 2003–2005; 2007; 2007–2008; 2008–2010; 2010; 2010–2011; 2013–2014; 2014–2019; 2014–2017; 2017; 2018–2019; 2019–2020; 2021–2022; 2022–2024; 2024–2025; 2025– 2025; 2026–	Sokol Vienna; Union Perchtoldsdorf; Austria (AC); Union Perchtoldsdorf; Hotvolleys Vienna (AC); Hotvolleys Vienna; VC Lennik; Romania; Bassano Volley; Quasar Massa Versilia; AZS Olsztyn; Al Arabi Doha; Estonia; Cuprum Lubin; Belogorie Belgorod; Asseco Resovia; Kuzbass Kemerovo; ZAKSA Kędzierzyn-Koźle; Slovenia; Skra Bełchatów; Serbia; Belogorie Belgorod; Asseco Resovia

Volleyball information
- Position: Middle blocker

Career
Years	Teams
1985–1993; 1993–1994; 1994–1995; 1995–1997; 1997–1998; 1998–1999; 1999–2000	Dinamo București; SV Lohhof; Sokol Vienna; Hotvolleys Vienna; Sokol Vienna; Union Perchtoldsdorf; Sokol Vienna
Honours
Men's volleyball
Head coach Estonia
FIVB Challenger Cup
Bronze medal – third place	2018 Portugal
European League
Gold medal – first place	2016 Bulgaria
Gold medal – first place	2018 Czech Republic
Head coach Slovenia
CEV European Championship
Bronze medal – third place	2023 Italy/Bulgaria/North Macedonia/Israel

Gheorghe Crețu (born 8 August 1968) is a Romanian professional volleyball coach and former player. He serves as head coach for the Serbia national team and Asseco Resovia.

== Honours ==
=== As a player ===
- Domestic
  - 1991–92 Romanian Championship, with Dinamo București
  - 1995–96 Austrian Cup, with Hotvolleys Vienna
  - 1995–96 Austrian Championship, with Hotvolleys Vienna
  - 1996–97 Austrian Cup, with Hotvolleys Vienna
  - 1996–97 Austrian Championship, with Hotvolleys Vienna

=== As a coach ===
- CEV Champions League
  - 2021–22 – with ZAKSA Kędzierzyn-Koźle
- Domestic
  - 2002–03 Austrian Cup, with Hotvolleys Vienna
  - 2002–03 Austrian Championship, with Hotvolleys Vienna
  - 2003–04 Austrian Championship, with Hotvolleys Vienna
  - 2013–14 Emir Cup, with Al Arabi Doha
  - 2019–20 Russian SuperCup, with Kuzbass Kemerovo
  - 2021–22 Polish Cup, with ZAKSA Kędzierzyn-Koźle
  - 2021–22 Polish Championship, with ZAKSA Kędzierzyn-Koźle

=== Individual awards ===
- 2017: Estonian Coach of the Year
- 2018: Estonian Coach of the Year
- 2022: CEV – Coach of the year
