= Paweł Rusek =

Polish volleyball player and coach

Personal information
- Nickname: Rufio
- Born: 21 January 1983 (age 43); Rybnik, Poland
- Height: 1.83 m (6 ft 0 in)

Coaching information
- Current team: Germany; Warta Zawiercie
Previous teams coached
Years	Teams
2020–2021; 2021–2024; 2022–2024; 2024– 2025–	Cuprum Lubin (AC); Cuprum Lubin; Poland (AC); Warta Zawiercie (AC); Germany (AC)

Volleyball information
- Position: Libero

Career
Years	Teams
2004–2012; 2012–2014; 2014–2017; 2017–2018; 2018–2020	Jastrzębski Węgiel; Trefl Gdańsk; Cuprum Lubin; Asseco Resovia; Jastrzębski Węgiel

Paweł Rusek (born 21 January 1983) is a Polish professional volleyball coach and former player. He serves as an assistant coach for the Polish PlusLiga team, Aluron CMC Warta Zawiercie.

== Honours ==
=== As a player ===
- FIVB Club World Championship
  - Doha 2011 – with Jastrzębski Węgiel
- CEV Challenge Cup
  - 2008–09 – with Jastrzębski Węgiel
- Domestic
  - 2005–06 Polish Championship, with Jastrzębski Węgiel
  - 2006–07 Polish Championship, with Jastrzębski Węgiel
  - 2009–10 Polish Cup, with Jastrzębski Węgiel
  - 2009–10 Polish Championship, with Jastrzębski Węgiel

=== Individual awards ===
- 2009: CEV Challenge Cup – Best receiver
- 2010: Polish Cup – Best defender
