= Rafael Redwitz =

Brazilian–French volleyball player and coach

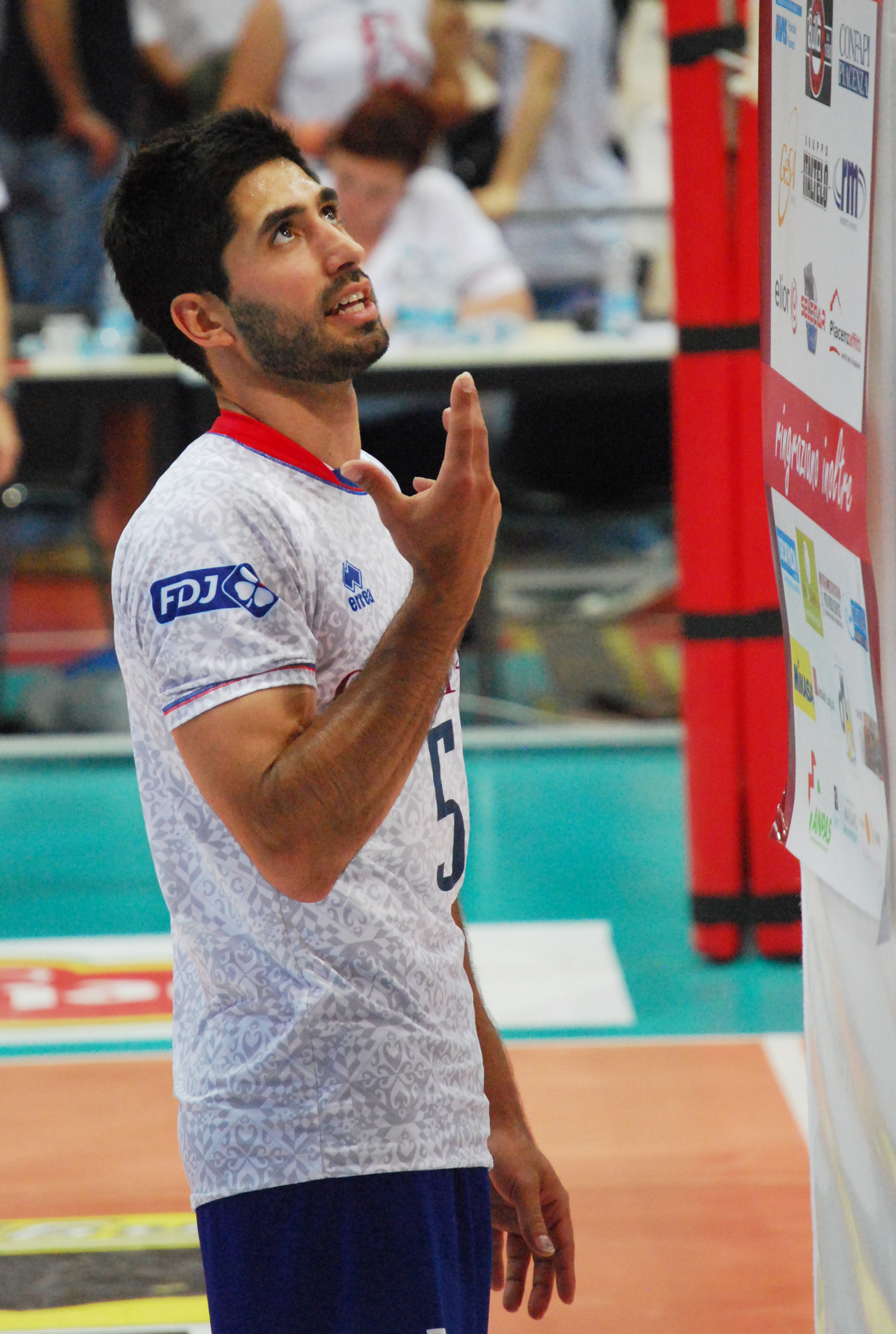

Personal information
- Nationality: Brazilian; French
- Born: 12 August 1980 (age 46); Curitiba, Brazil
- Height: 1.86 m (6 ft 1 in)

Coaching information
- Current team: Nice VB
Previous teams coached
Years	Teams
2021–	Nice VB

Volleyball information
- Position: Setter

Career
Years	Teams
2003–2004; 2004–2005; 2005–2008; 2008–2009; 2009–2010; 2010–2012; 2012–2013; 2013–2015; 2015–2016; 2016–2018; 2018; 2018–2019; 2019–2020; 2020–2021	CV Andorra; Arago de Sète; Paris Volley; Volley Forlì; Asseco Resovia; Tours VB; Iskra Odintsovo; Montpellier UC; AZS Częstochowa; Arago de Sète; Asseco Resovia; VfB Friedrichshafen; Narbonne Volley; Consar Ravenna

National team
2007; 2013–2014	Brazil (4); France (40)

Rafael Redwitz (born 12 August 1980) is a Brazilian–French volleyball coach and former player. He's had obtained French nationality in 1992, and was a member of the France national team. He currently serves as head coach for Nice VB.

== Honours ==
=== Clubs ===
- National championships
  - 2005/2006 French Championship, with Paris Volley
  - 2006/2007 French SuperCup, with Paris Volley
  - 2006/2007 French Championship, with Paris Volley
  - 2007/2008 French Championship, with Paris Volley
  - 2010/2011 French Cup, with Tours VB
  - 2011/2012 French Championship, with Tours VB
  - 2018/2019 German Cup, with VfB Friedrichshafen

=== Individual awards ===
- 2010: Polish Cup – Best Setter
- 2012: French Championship – Best Setter
