= Grzegorz Kosok =

Polish volleyball player

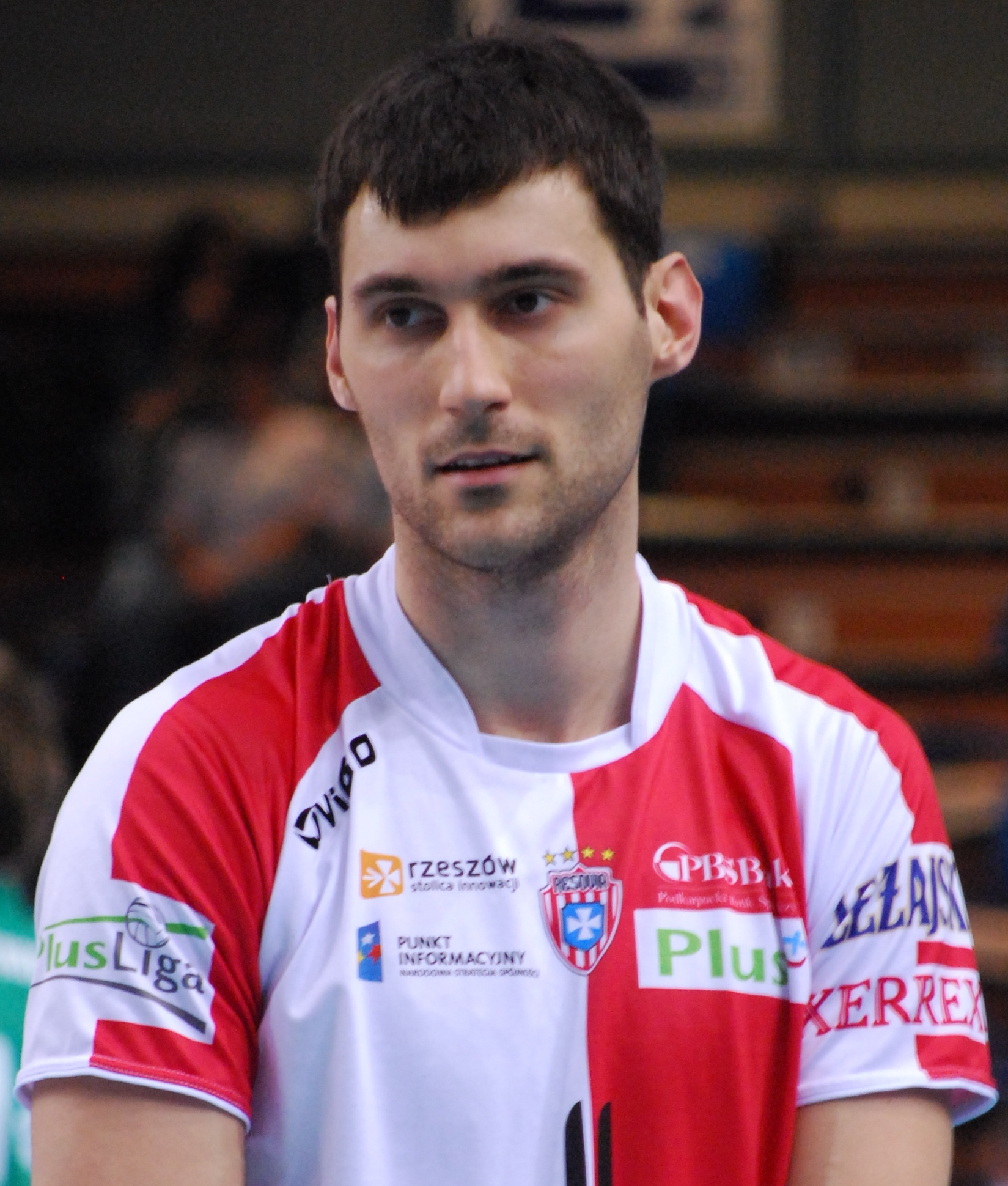

Personal information
- Nickname: Kosa
- Born: 2 March 1986 (age 40); Katowice, Poland
- Height: 2.05 m (6 ft 9 in)

Volleyball information
- Position: Middle blocker

Career
Years	Teams
2005–2008; 2008–2009; 2009–2014; 2014–2015; 2015–2016; 2016–2019; 2019–2020; 2020–2021	Płomień Sosnowiec; Jadar Radom; Asseco Resovia; Jastrzębski Węgiel; Łuczniczka Bydgoszcz; Jastrzębski Węgiel; Asseco Resovia; Jastrzębski Węgiel

National team
2011–2013	Poland
Honours
Men's volleyball
Representing Poland
FIVB World League
Gold medal – first place	2012 Sofia
Bronze medal – third place	2011 Gdańsk
CEV European Championship
Bronze medal – third place	2011 Austria/Czech Republic

Grzegorz Kosok (born 2 March 1986) is a Polish former professional volleyball player, a member of the Poland national team in 2011–2013, a participant at the Olympic Games London 2012, and the 2012 World League winner.

== Personal life ==
He was born in Katowice, Poland. In 2014, he married Aleksandra. In June 2015, his wife gave birth to their daughter Amelia.

== Career ==
=== Clubs ===
Kosok moved to Asseco Resovia in 2009. With the club from Rzeszów he achieved two gold (2012, 2013), silver (2014) and two bronze medals (2010, 2011) of the Polish Championship. He left Asseco Resovia after five years in May 2014.

=== National team ===
First time, he was appointed to the Polish national team by Andrea Anastasi in 2011. He won a bronze medal of the 2011 FIVB World League and the 2011 CEV European Championship. In November 2011 Poland won a silver medal of the 2011 FIVB World Cup and therefore qualified for the 2012 Olympic Games in London. He is a gold medalist of the 2012 FIVB World League in Sofia, Bulgaria. In 2015 he was called up to the team B of the Polish national team led by Andrzej Kowal. Kosok took part in the 1st edition of the 2015 European Games.

== Honours ==
=== Clubs ===
- CEV Cup
  - 2011/2012 – with Asseco Resovia
- National championships
  - 2011/2012 Polish Championship, with Asseco Resovia
  - 2012/2013 Polish Championship, with Asseco Resovia
  - 2013/2014 Polish SuperCup, with Asseco Resovia
  - 2020/2021 Polish Championship, with Jastrzębski Węgiel
