= Hachatur Stepanyan =

Russian volleyball player (born 1985)

Personal information
- Nationality: Russian
- Born: 21 March 1985 (age 41)
- Height: 192 cm (6 ft 4 in)
- Weight: 91 kg (201 lb)
- Spike: 321 cm (126 in)
- Block: 312 cm (123 in)

Volleyball information
- Position: libero
- Number: 20 (national team)

Career
Years	Teams
2011	Belogorie

National team
2011	Russia

Hachatur Stepanyan (born 21 March 1985) is a former Russian male volleyball player. He was part of the Russia men's national volleyball team. On club level he played for Belogorie Belgorod.
