= Resovia (volleyball) =

Polish volleyball club

Asseco Resovia
- Full name: Asseco Resovia Spółka Akcyjna
- Short name: Resovia
- Nickname: Pasy (The Stripes), Sovia
- Founded: 1937; 89 years ago
- Ground: Hala Podpromie (Capacity: 4,304)
- Chairman: Piotr Maciąg
- Manager: Gheorghe Crețu
- Captain: Marcin Janusz
- League: Tauron Liga
- 2025–26: 4th place
- Website: Club home page

Uniforms
Home	Away

Resovia, officially known for sponsorship reasons as Asseco Resovia, is a professional men's volleyball club based in Rzeszów in southeastern Poland, founded in 1937. They compete in the Polish Tauron Liga.

Initially part of the Resovia multi-sports club founded 1905, it has operated independently since 2006. The club has won seven Polish Champion titles and three national cups. They won four league titles in the 1970s and the first title in the 21st century in 2012, which put an end to Skra Bełchatów's dominance in the PlusLiga which lasted for 7 consecutive seasons.

== Honours ==
=== Domestic ===
- Polish Championship

Winners (7): 1970–71, 1971–72, 1973–74, 1974–75, 2011–12, 2012–13, 2014–15

- Polish Cup

Winners (3): 1974–75, 1982–83, 1986–87

- Polish SuperCup

Winners (1): 2013–14

=== International ===
- CEV Champions League

Silver (1): 2014–15
Final Four (1): 2015–16

- CEV European Champions Cup

Silver (1): 1972–73

- CEV Cup

Winners (1): 2023–24
Silver (2): 2011–12, 2024–25

== Club history ==
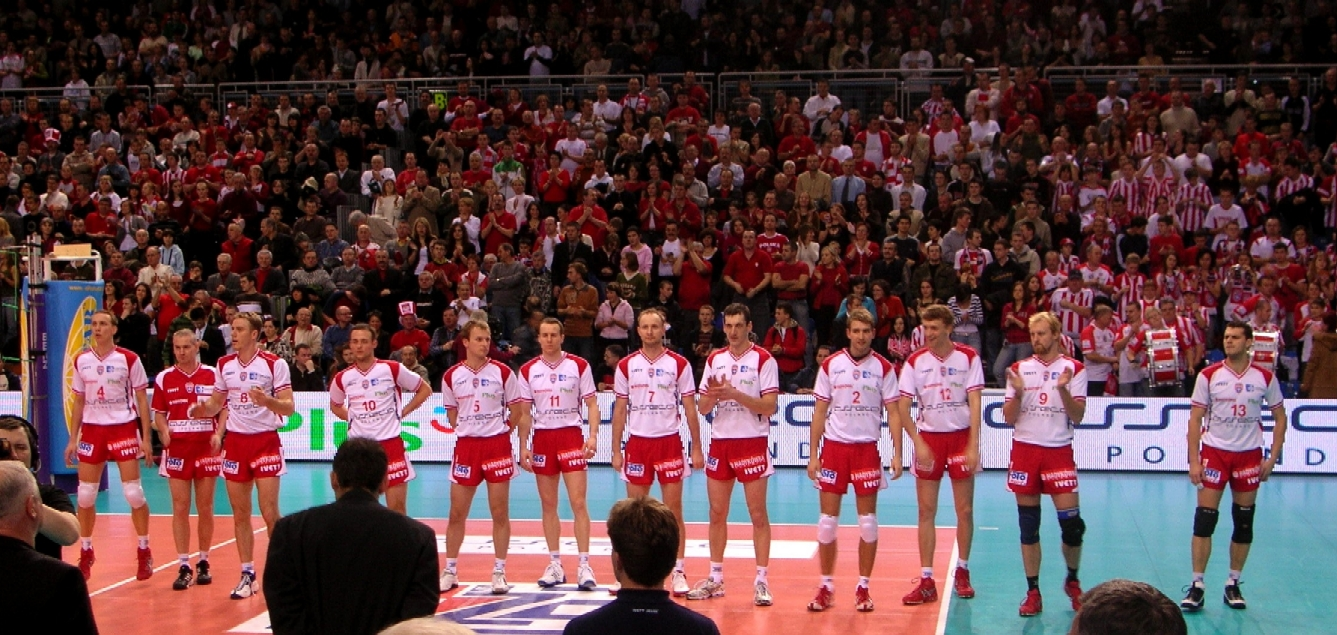
Asseco Resovia before the match in Rzeszów against AZS Częstochowa on 9 February 2007.

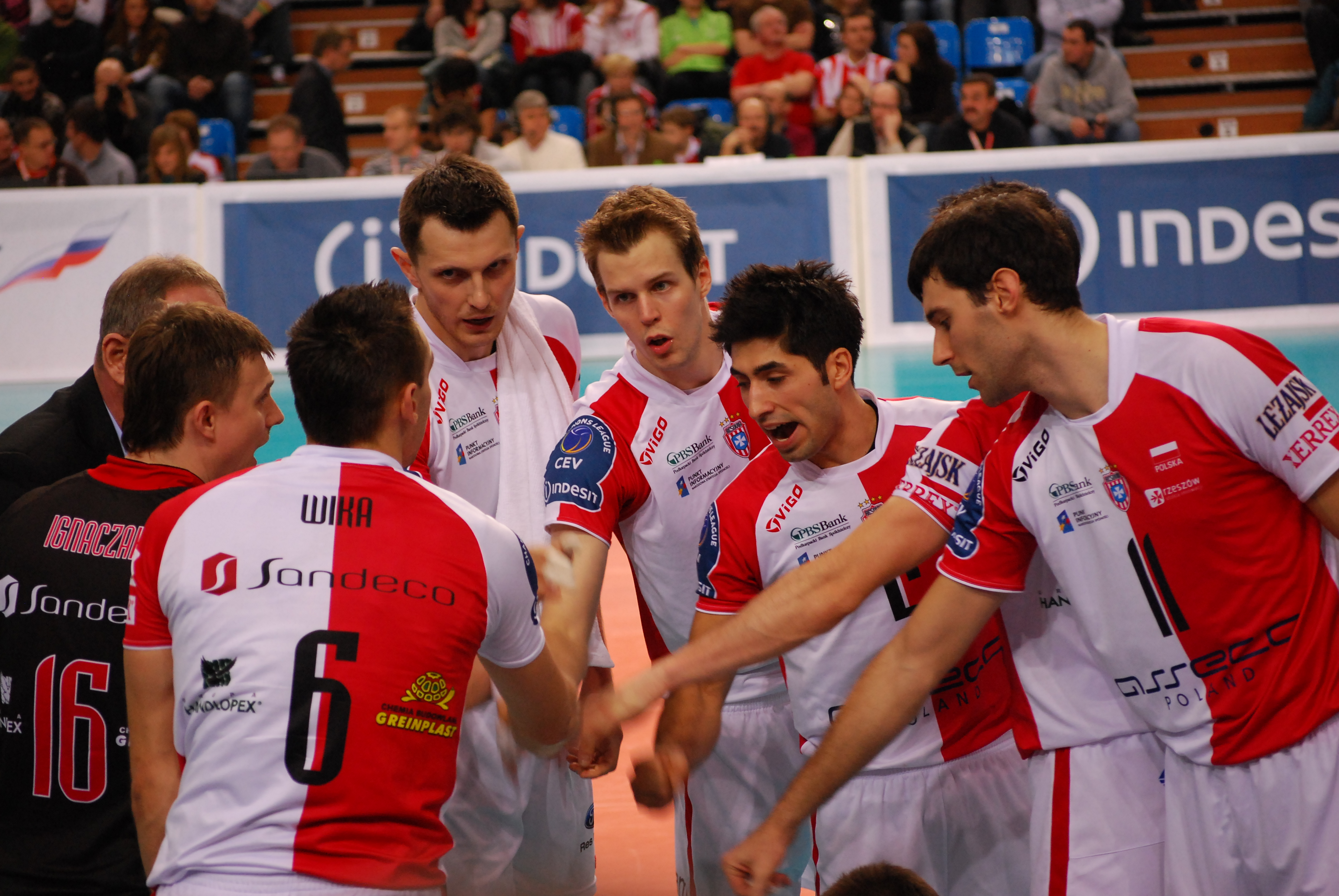
From left Ignaczak (#16), Wika (#6), Grzyb, Oivanen, Redwitz and Kosok (#11) during the match with Paris Volley in the 2009–10 CEV Champions League season.

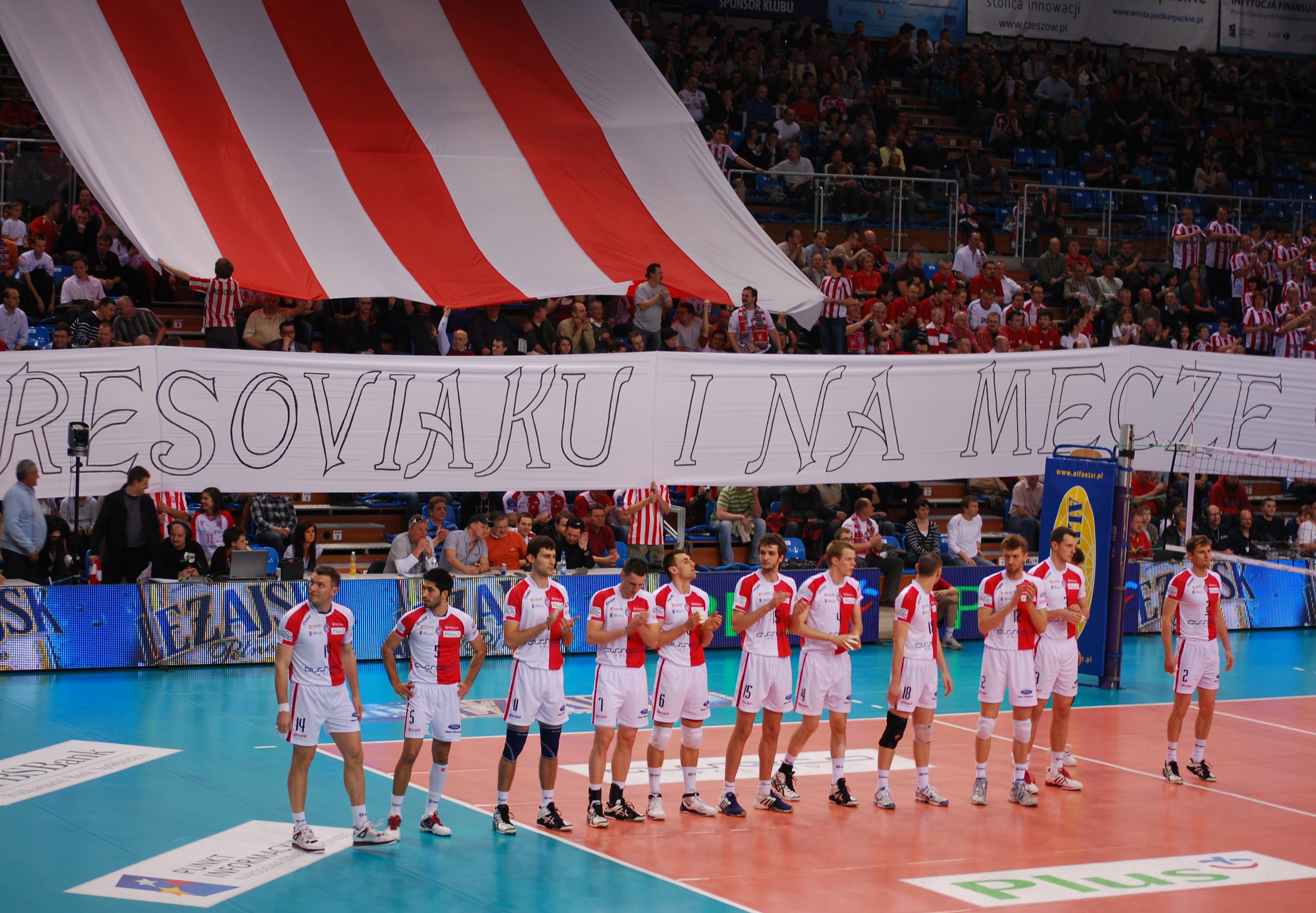
Before the match with AZS Częstochowa in PlusLiga playoffs in 2010.

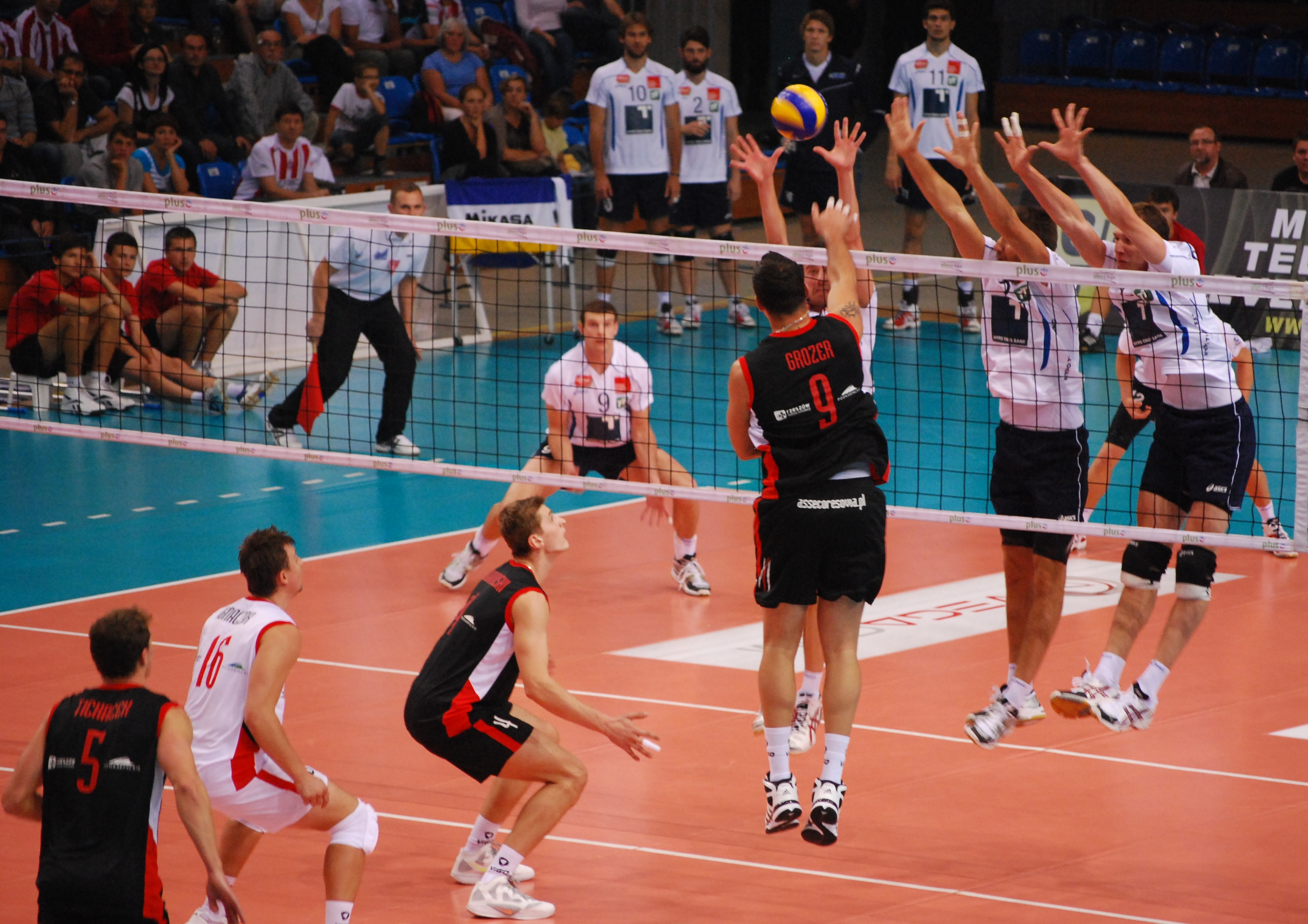
György Grozer (#9) during the match on 23 September 2011.

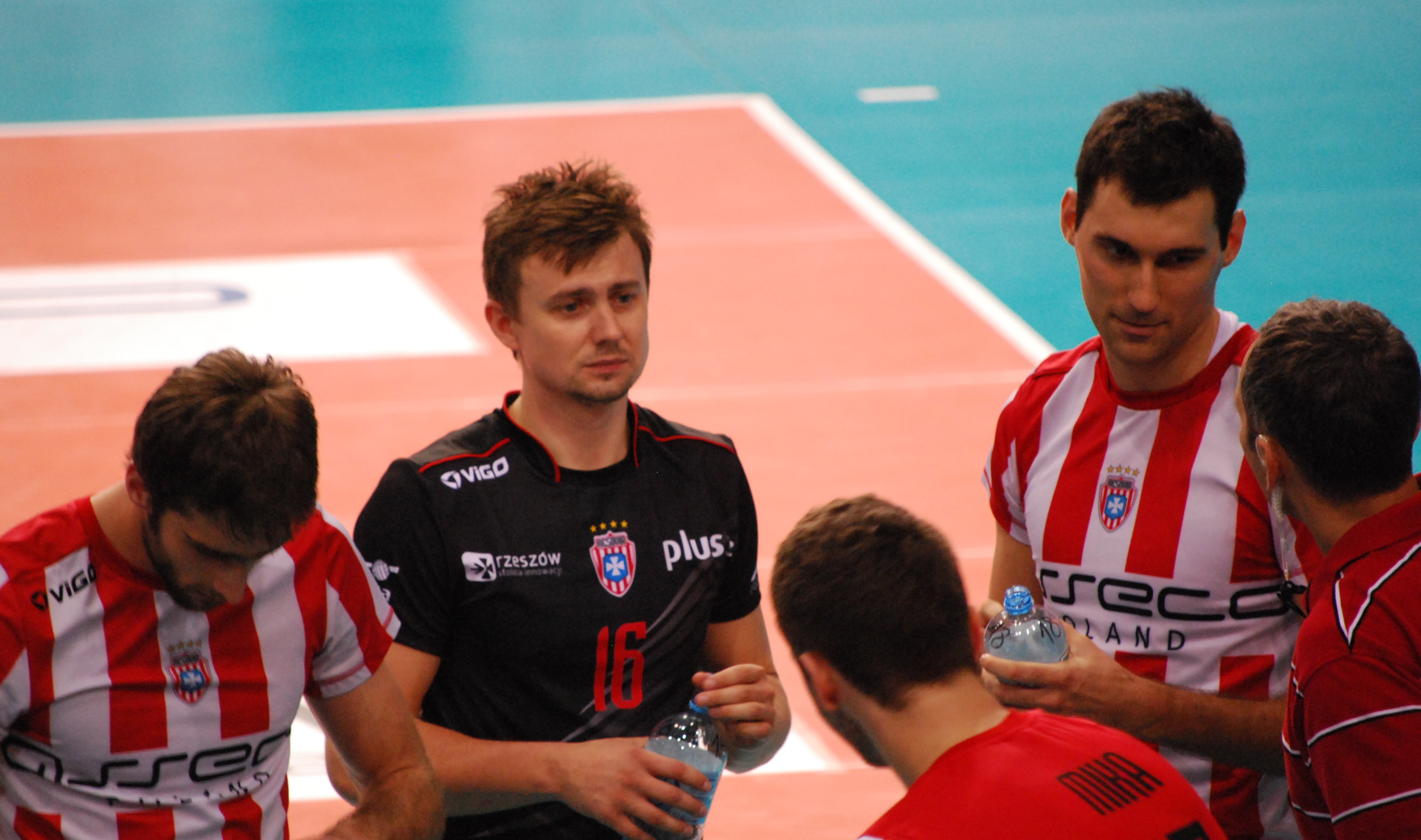
Krzysztof Ignaczak (#16) and Grzegorz Kosok (#4) during a time–out on 25 September 2011.

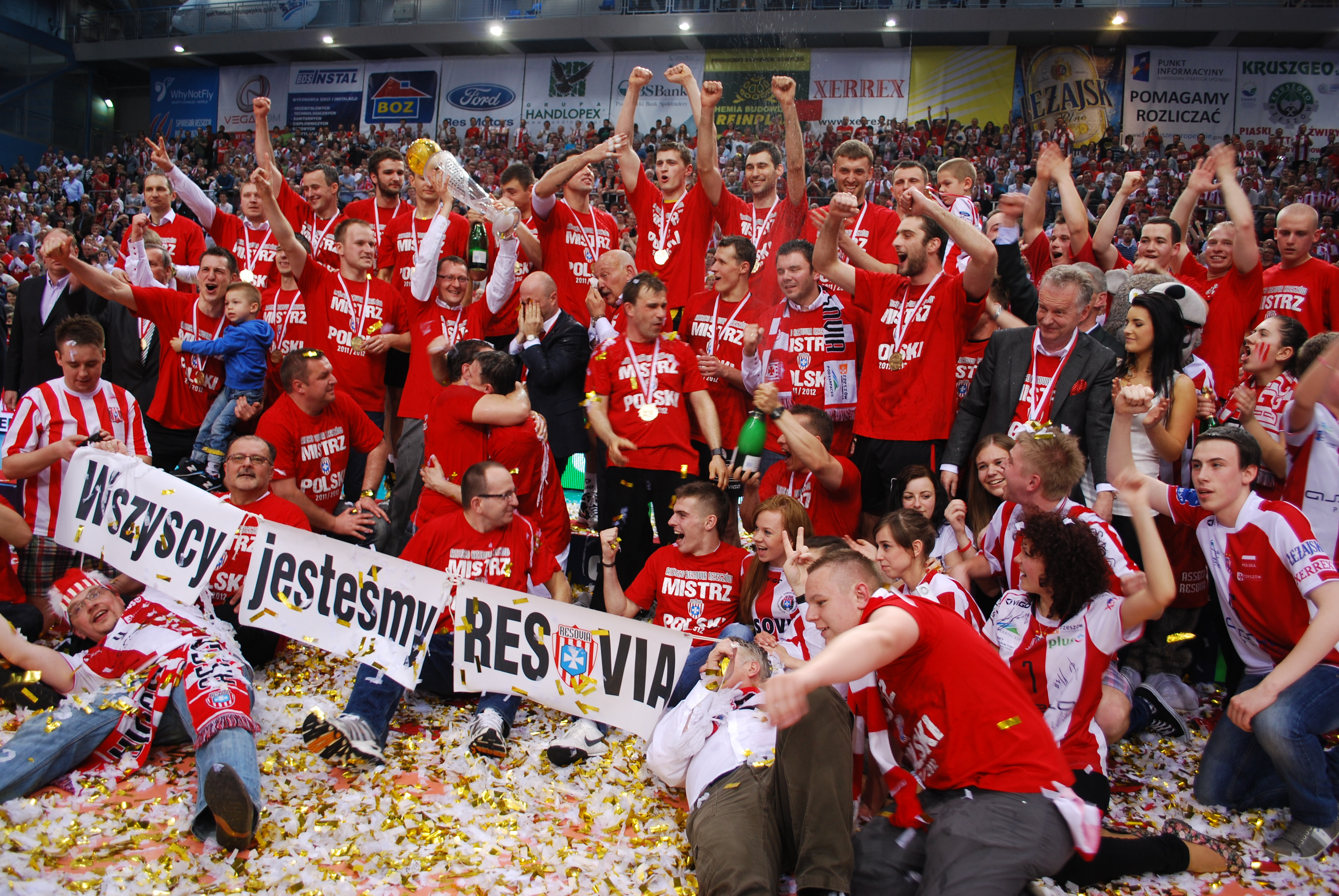
After winning the Polish Championship in 2012.

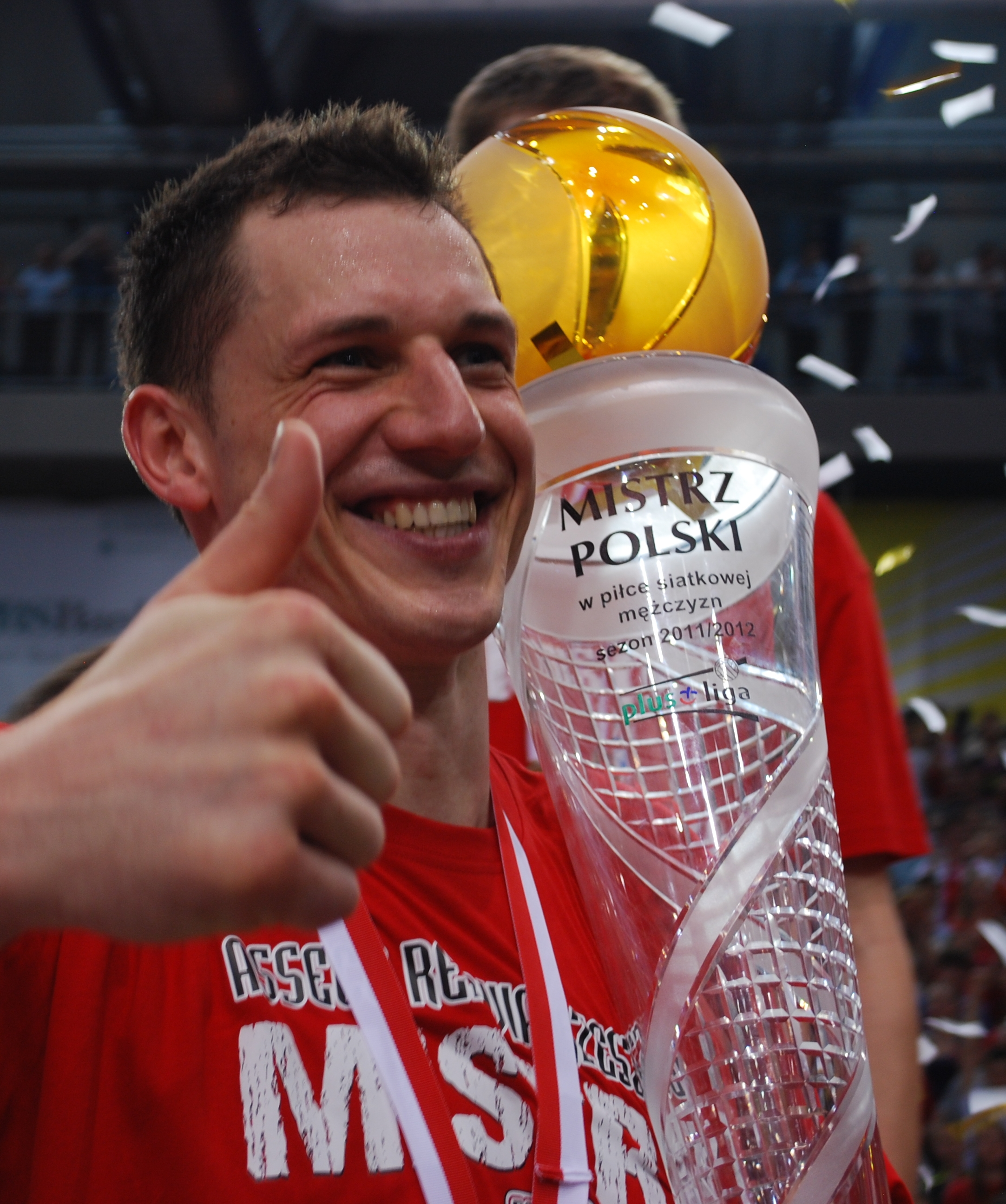
Former captain of Asseco Resovia – Aleh Akhrem, after winning the Polish Championship in 2012.

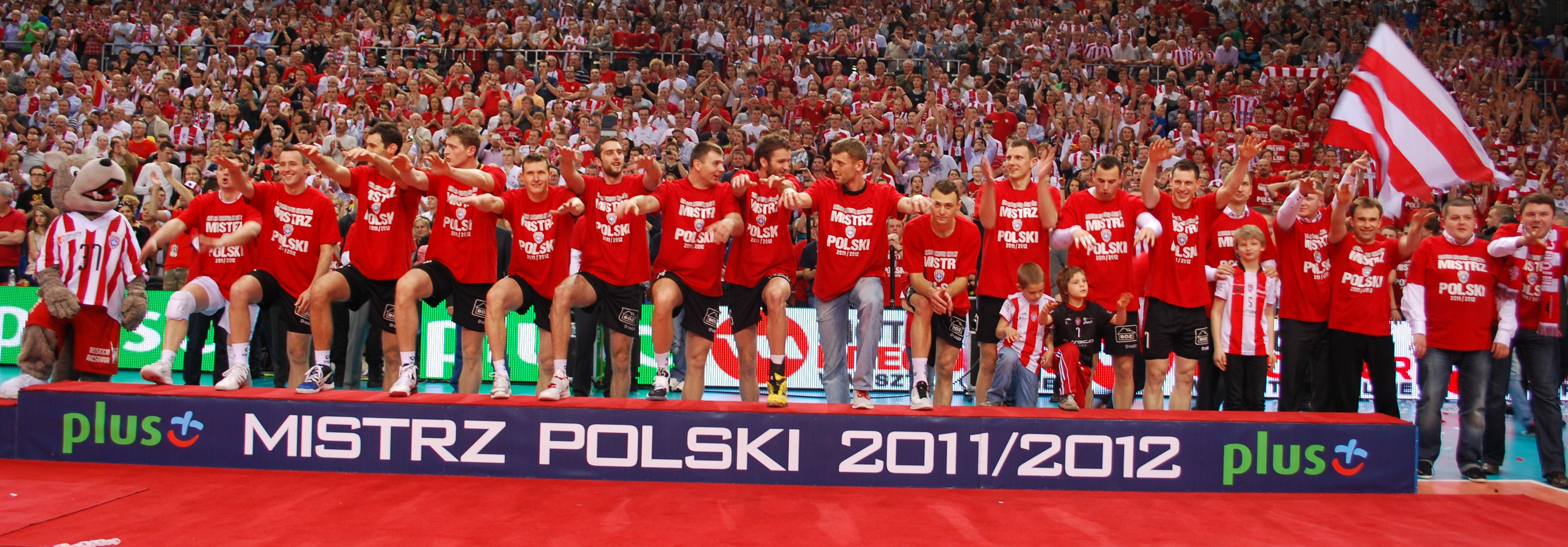
Medal ceremony of the 2011–12 PlusLiga season.

Resovia was established in 1937 in the city of Rzeszów. In 2006, Asseco became the main sponsor of the club. The name Resovia is derived from the Latin, meaning Rzeszów, what has been confirmed by the city council in 2013. In 1969, the club was promoted to the 1st Polish Volleyball League, the highest level volleyball league, playing there until 1991.

The 1970s were the most successful in the club's long history. During that time Resovia led by Jan Strzelczyk and Władyslaw Pałaszewski achieved its biggest successes, winning four Polish Championships (1971, 1972, 1974, 1975), one Polish Cup (1975), and a silver medal of the 1972–73 CEV European Champions Cup. The team of that time consisted of such players like Bronisław Bebel, Stanisław Gościniak, Marek Karbarz or Włodzimierz Stefański who played a major role in the Polish national volleyball team, leading Poland to the titles of 1976 Olympic Champions and 1974 World Champions. In the next years, the club also managed to win 2 Polish Cups in 1983 and 1987 before being relegated in 1991.

After being relegated in 1991, the club spent over a decade in the 2nd Polish Volleyball League. In 2004, the team led by a former Resovia player – Jan Such, was promoted to the newly created professional volleyball league (official name since 2008: PlusLiga). Its first season in the top league Resovia ended in 7th place, achieving higher positions in the next years. In 2006, due to sponsorship reasons, the club changed its name to Asseco Resovia. During the 2007–08 season, Resovia, led by Andrzej Kowal, took part in the CEV Challenge Cup, losing both, the semifinal to Modena Volley (2–3), and a match for third place to the French team, Stade Poitevin Poitiers (0–3). Eventually, the 2008–09 PlusLiga season, Resovia finished in 2nd place (first medal after 20 years), and gained the right to play in the next CEV Champions League edition where they lost a two–game playoffs to Trentino BetClic (0–3, 1–3), the future competition champion. The 2009–10 PlusLiga season, Resovia finished in 3rd place.

In the 2010–11 PlusLiga season, Resovia reached the semifinals of the 2010–11 CEV Cup and lost a two–legged tie to the Italian team, Sisley Treviso (2–3, 1–3). The 2010–11 PlusLiga season Resovia for the second time in a row ended in 3rd place. After the season Ljubomir Travica left the club and a Polish coach Andrzej Kowal took over the team for the next 6 seasons. The next year due to the 3rd place last PlusLiga season Resovia once again spent playing in the CEV Cup, but for this time managed to reach the final and after tough fighting against Russian team Dynamo Moscow (2–3, 2–3) lost and was awarded with the silver medals. On the other hand, after 7 years of the PGE Skra Bełchatów dominance in the Polish league Resovia achieved its 5th title of the Polish Champion beating Skra in four matches (3–1) (first title after 37 years).

In the 2012–13 PlusLiga season, Resovia as a reigning Polish Champion was once again granted the right to compete in the upcoming 2012–13 CEV Champions League edition. The club ended in 2nd place in the league round and was eventually stopped by Italian team Lube Banca Marche Macerata in the Playoff 12 (0–3, 1–3). However, Resovia ended the season with another, 6th title of the Polish Champion beating ZAKSA Kędzierzyn-Koźle after five matches (3–2). In the next 2013–14 CEV Champions League edition, after achieving first place in the league round and beating Belgian team Knack Roeselare in the playoff stage Resovia has been defeated by another Polish club in the competition – Jastrzębski Węgiel (0–3, 1–3). In the domestic competition PGE Skra Bełchatów regained the Polish Champion title, defeating Resovia in 3 matches (3–0).

During the 2014–15 PlusLiga season, Resovia was competing in the 2014–15 CEV Champions League. The club beat Russian club Lokomotiv Novosibirsk (3–1) and lost in revenge match in Rzeszów (2–3) on 11 March 2015. Resovia reached the Final Four, which was held in Berlin, Germany and played with another Polish team – PGE Skra Bełchatów and for the first time in competition's history two Polish teams played in the semifinal of the CEV Champions League. On 28 March 2015 Resovia beat PGE Skra Bełchatów in the semifinal (3–0) and eventually lost in final to Zenit Kazan (0–3). On 28 April 2015 Resovia won its 7th title of the Polish Champion.

On 16–17 April 2016, Resovia was a host of the 2015–16 CEV Champions League Final Four held in Tauron Arena Kraków. The team lost the semifinal to Zenit Kazan (1–3), and a match for third place to Cucine Lube Civitanova (2–3), and ended the tournament in 4th place. Russell Holmes received an individual award for the Best Middle Blocker of the tournament. During the 2015–16 PlusLiga season, Resovia took second place in the regular season because of the better set ratio than PGE Skra Bełchatów (Skra lost one more set than Resovia). In the final, ZAKSA Kędzierzyn-Koźle beat Resovia in three matches (0–3).

Since 2016, the club failed to achieve any significant success ending the 2016–17 PlusLiga season in 4th place and losing the quarterfinal of the Polish Cup to Lotos Trefl Gdańsk. In the 2016–17 CEV Champions League season, the team ended in 3rd place in the league round, and as one of the three third–placed teams was promoted to the next stage. Resovia was not able to defeat Italian team Modena Volley and has been eliminated in the Playoff 12 (2–3, 1–3). By the end of the 2016–17 PlusLiga season, Andrzej Kowal announced his departure as the Resovia head coach. Roberto Serniotti was announced as the new Resovia head coach on 11 May 2017.

After achieving 4th place in the previous PlusLiga season, Resovia took part in the 2017–18 CEV Cup reaching the semifinals and eventually losing to Russian team Belogorie Belgorod (0–3, 0–3). In the domestic league, Resovia achieved 6th place, losing in three matches (1–2) of the first round of the playoffs to Indykpol AZS Olsztyn. On 3 December 2017, an Italian expert Roberto Serniotti was dismissed as a head coach after spending only a few months in the club. He has been replaced by Andrzej Kowal who returned to his post after a short break.

At the beginning of the 2018–19 PlusLiga season, Resovia lost 4 matches in a row what resulted in dismissal of both Andrzej Kowal, and the club's chairman – Bartosz Górski. The club decided to employ a Romanian expert Gheorghe Crețu and a former Resovia player – Krzysztof Ignaczak as the club's new chairman. Nevertheless, the team did not manage to qualify to the playoff stage and eventually ended the season in 7th place. In the same season, Resovia took part in the 2018 Club World Championship held in Poland, surprisingly defeating the Brazilian team Sada Cruzeiro in the preliminary round and qualifying to the semifinals. In the semifinals, the team from Rzeszów has been defeated by Italian team Cucine Lube Civitanova in 4 sets (1–3) and ended the tournament in 4th place losing also a match for third place to the Russian team Fakel Novy Urengoy (1–3). The contract with Gheorghe Crețu was not renewed, and on 9 May 2020 Piotr Gruszka was announced as the new Resovia head coach.

The 2019–20 PlusLiga season can be named the worst in club's modern history. The team, led by Piotr Gruszka (dismissed on 30 January 2020), and Italian coach Emanuele Zanini (since 11 February 2020) ended the season in 13th place, winning only 7 out of 24 matches and barely avoiding relegation. Krzysztof Ignaczak resigned his post as the club's chairman on 14 February 2020, and has been replaced by Piotr Maciąg. Emanuele Zanini remained the head coach of Resovia until the end of the season. On 8 April 2020, an Italian expert Alberto Giuliani was announced as the new Resovia head coach.

== Team ==
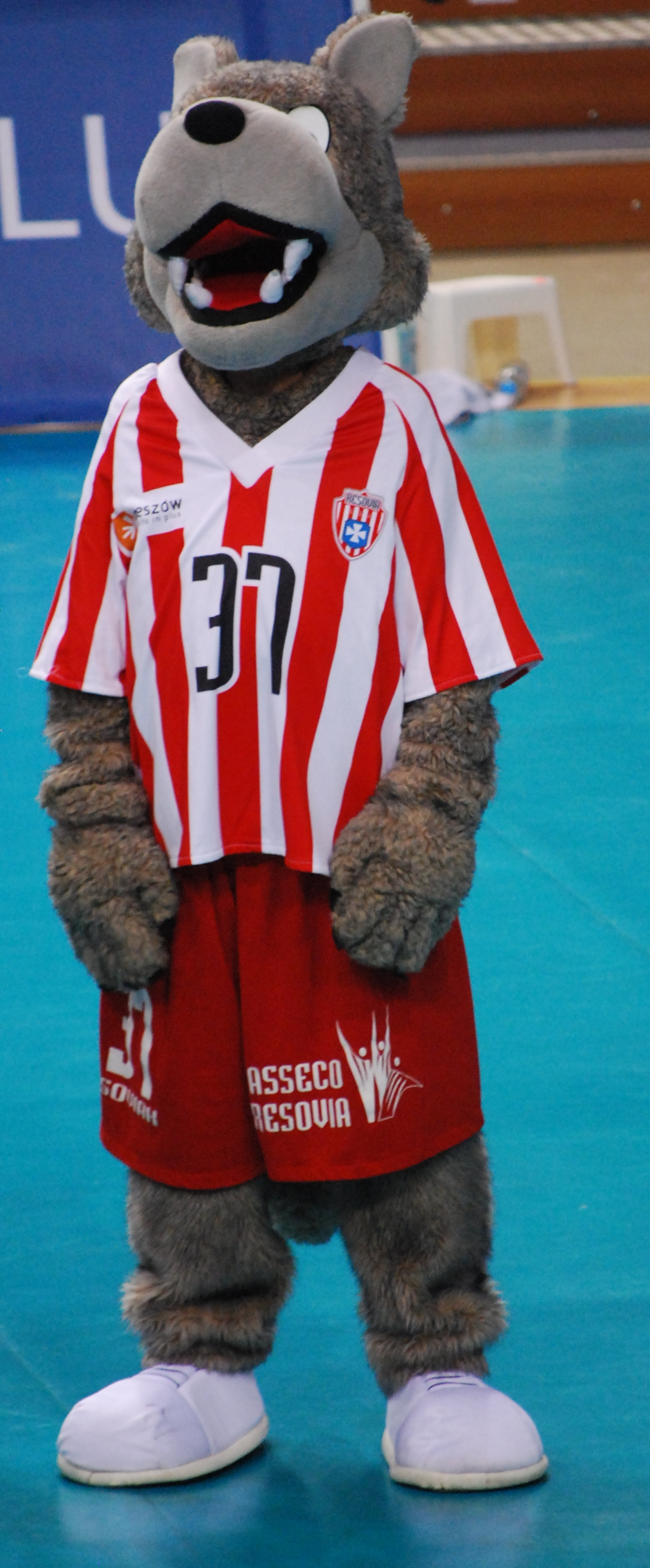
Soviak, the official mascot of Resovia.

As of 2026–27 season

No.	Name	Date of birth	Position
1	(Poland) Mateusz Poręba	24 August 1999 (age 27)	middle blocker
2	(Poland) Dawid Woch	16 May 1997 (age 29)	middle blocker
3	(Poland) Wiktor Nowak	21 May 1999 (age 27)	setter
4	(Poland) Kamil Kwasowski	13 September 1990 (age 36)	outside hitter
5	(Poland) Łukasz Kaczmarek	29 June 1994 (age 32)	opposite
6	(Canada) Danny Demyanenko	13 July 1994 (age 32)	middle blocker
10	(Germany) Tobias Brand	9 July 1998 (age 28)	outside hitter
12	(Poland) Artur Szalpuk	20 March 1995 (age 31)	outside hitter
13	(Poland) Michał Potera	6 March 1988 (age 38)	libero
16	(Poland) Paweł Zatorski	21 June 1990 (age 36)	libero
18	(Slovenia) Klemen Čebulj	21 February 1992 (age 34)	outside hitter
19	(Poland) Marcin Janusz	31 July 1994 (age 32)	setter
21	(Poland) Karol Butryn	18 June 1993 (age 33)	opposite
22	(Romania) Bela Bartha	19 October 2000 (age 26)	middle blocker
24	(Poland) Tymoteusz Lenik	13 January 2007 (age 19)	middle blocker
Head coach:		(Romania) Gheorghe Crețu	

== Season by season ==
Season	Tier	League	Pos.
2008–09	1	PlusLiga	2
2009–10	1	PlusLiga	3
2010–11	1	PlusLiga	3
2011–12	1	PlusLiga	1st place, gold medalist(s)
2012–13	1	PlusLiga	1st place, gold medalist(s)
2013–14	1	PlusLiga	2
2014–15	1	PlusLiga	1st place, gold medalist(s)
2015–16	1	PlusLiga	2
2016–17	1	PlusLiga	4

Season	Tier	League	Pos.
2017–18	1	PlusLiga	6
2018–19	1	PlusLiga	7
2019–20	1	PlusLiga	13
2020–21	1	PlusLiga	5
2021–22	1	PlusLiga	5
2022–23	1	PlusLiga	3
2023–24	1	PlusLiga	4
2024–25	1	PlusLiga	6
2025–26	1	PlusLiga	4

== See also ==
- Resovia players
- Resovia coaches
