= Dmytro Filippov =

Greek volleyball player (born 1990)

Dima Filippov

Personal information
- Nationality: Greek
- Born: 4 December 1990 (age 35); Luhansk, Ukrainian SSR, Soviet Union
- Height: 198 cm (6 ft 6 in)
- Weight: 84 kg (185 lb)
- Spike: 343 cm (135 in)
- Block: 320 cm (126 in)

Volleyball information
- Position: setter
- Current club: ASK Nizhny Novgorod
- Number: 5

Career
Years	Teams
2010–2013; 2013–2015; 2015–2017; 2017–2018; 2018–2020; 2020–2024; 2024–	Olympiacos; Jastrzębski Węgiel; Olympiacos; CS Arcada Galați; PAOK Thessaloniki; Volley Amriswil; ASK Nizhny Novgorod

National team
2011–2021	Greece (65)
Honours
Men's volleyball
Representing Greece
Mediterranean Games
Bronze medal – third place	2018 Tarragona	Team

Dmytro "Dima" Filippov (Greek: Ντίμα Φιλίποφ, Ukrainian: Дмитро Филиппов; born 4 December 1990) is a Greek volleyball player of Russian -Ukrainian descent. He is part of the Greece men's national volleyball team. On club level he plays for ASK Nizhny Novgorod.
