= Aquacare Halen =

Belgian volleyball club

- Ground: De Koekoek; Halen; Belgium
- Chairman: (Belgium) Etienne de Séjournet de Rameignies
- League: Liga Heren
- Website: Club home page

Uniforms
Home	Away

Volleybalclub Aquacare Halen is a volleyball club based in Halen, Belgium.

The men's A squad currently plays in the Liga, the highest level of Belgian men's volleyball. The club has been there since 2002. Their best league position was 5th, achieved in 2004–05, 2006–07 and 2007–08. Because of this, the team has already played three times in the Challenge Cup, formerly known as the CEV Cup.

The club was founded in 2002 as a result of a merger between Schuvoc Herk-de-Stad en Halen VC. Those two teams also were the result of earlier mergers.

The men's B and C squad, as well as the three women's teams, play in the lower, provincial leagues.

== 2010-11 squad ==
Coach: (Sweden) Johan Isacsson

#	Nat.	Name
1	(Belgium)	Dries Koekelkoren
2	(Netherlands)	Jelle van Jaarsveld
3	(Belgium)	Wannes Rosiers
4	(Netherlands)	Hans Goverde
5	(Netherlands)	Wout Gielens
6	(Sweden)	Linus Tholse
10	(Argentina)	Ignacio Forastiero
11	(Belgium)	Dirk Luyten
13	(Belgium)	Tom Van Walle
15	(Belgium)	Daan Van den Eynde
17	(Belgium)	Aljosa Urnaut
