= 2012–13 CEV Champions League =

- League: CEV Champions League
- Sport: Volleyball
- Duration: 22 October 2012 – 18 March 2013
- Teams: 28

Finals
- Venue: (Russia) Omsk
- Champions: (Russia) Lokomotiv Novosibirsk
- Finals MVP: (Sweden) Marcus Nilsson

CEV Champions League seasons
- ← 2011–12 2013–14 →

The 2012–13 CEV Champions League was the 54th edition of the highest level European volleyball club competition organised by the European Volleyball Confederation.

== Participating teams ==
Rank	Country	Number of teams	Teams
1	Italy	3	Diatec Trentino; Bre Banca Lannutti Cuneo; Lube Banca Marche Macerata
2	Russia	3	Zenit Kazan; Lokomotiv Novosibirsk; Dynamo Moscow
3	Poland	3	PGE Skra Bełchatów; ZAKSA Kędzierzyn-Koźle; Asseco Resovia
4	Belgium	3	Euphony Asse-Lennik; Noliko Maaseik; Knack Roeselare
5	Turkey	2	Fenerbahçe Grundig İstanbul; Arkas İzmir
6	France	2	Tours VB; Arago de Sète
7	Germany	3	VfB Friedrichshafen; Generali Unterhaching; Berlin Recycling Volleys
8	Austria	1	Hypo Tirol Innsbruck
9	Spain	1	CAI Teruel
10	Slovenia	1	ACH Volley Ljubljana
11	Serbia	1	Crvena Zvezda Beograd
12	Romania	2	Remat Zalău; Tomis Constanța
13	Czech Republic	1	Jihostroj České Budějovice
14	Montenegro	1	Budvanska Rivijera Budva
15	Bulgaria	1	Marek Union-Ivkoni Dupnitsa

== League round ==
28 teams were drawn to 7 pools of 4 teams each.
The 1st + the best 5 ranked with the best score qualified for the Playoff 12
The organizer of the Final Four were determined after the end of the League Round and qualified directly for the Final Four.
The team of the organizer of the Final Four was replaced by the next 2nd ranked team with the best score.
The remaining second-placed teams as well 3 third ranked teams with the best score moved to the Challenge Round of the CEV Cup
The remaining 3rd placed and all 4th placed teams were eliminated.

- All times are local.

=== Pool A ===
Pos	Team	Pld	W	L	Pts	SW	SL	SR	SPW	SPL	SPR	Qualification
1	(Russia) Zenit Kazan	6	6	0	18	18	0	MAX	462	354	1.305	Playoffs
2	(Belgium) Knack Roeselare	6	3	3	9	11	12	0.917	574	421	1.363	2012–13 CEV Cup
3	(Germany) VfB Friedrichshafen	6	2	4	5	9	16	0.563	512	558	0.918	
4	(Austria) Hypo Tirol Innsbruck	6	1	5	4	7	17	0.412	478	537	0.890	

Date	Time		Score		Set 1	Set 2	Set 3	Set 4	Set 5	Total	Report
24 Oct	19:00	Zenit Kazan (Russia)	3–0	(Belgium) Knack Roeselare	25–22	25–18	25–22			75–62	Report
24 Oct	20:25	Hypo Tirol Innsbruck (Austria)	2–3	(Germany) VfB Friedrichshafen	25–19	25–16	20–25	23–25	9–15	102–100	Report
31 Oct	20:30	VfB Friedrichshafen (Germany)	0–3	(Russia) Zenit Kazan	17–25	21–25	22–25			60–75	Report
31 Oct	20:30	Knack Roeselare (Belgium)	3–0	(Austria) Hypo Tirol Innsbruck	25–22	25–12	25–14			75–48	Report
14 Nov	19:00	Zenit Kazan (Russia)	3–0	(Austria) Hypo Tirol Innsbruck	25–10	25–16	34–32			84–58	Report
14 Nov	20:30	Knack Roeselare (Belgium)	3–1	(Germany) VfB Friedrichshafen	26–24	22–25	25–20	25–23		98–92	Report
21 Nov	20:25	Hypo Tirol Innsbruck (Austria)	0–3	(Russia) Zenit Kazan	23–25	21–25	17–25			61–75	Report
21 Nov	20:30	VfB Friedrichshafen (Germany)	3–2	(Belgium) Knack Roeselare	15–25	20–25	25–18	25–22	16–14	101–104	Report
5 Dec	20:00	Zenit Kazan (Russia)	3–0	(Germany) VfB Friedrichshafen	25–20	25–17	25–17			75–54	Report
5 Dec	20:30	Hypo Tirol Innsbruck (Austria)	2–3	(Belgium) Knack Roeselare	23–25	25–17	25–18	21–25	11–15	105–100	Report
12 Dec	20:30	VfB Friedrichshafen (Germany)	2–3	(Austria) Hypo Tirol Innsbruck	20–25	22–25	25–21	25–17	12–15	104–103	Report
12 Dec	20:30	Knack Roeselare (Belgium)	0–3	(Russia) Zenit Kazan	17–25	14–25	26–28			57–78	Report

=== Pool B ===
Pos	Team	Pld	W	L	Pts	SW	SL	SR	SPW	SPL	SPR	Qualification
1	(Russia) Lokomotiv Novosibirsk (Note: Qualified as hosts) (H)	6	5	1	15	16	5	3.200	510	460	1.109	Final Four
2	(Germany) Berlin Recycling Volleys	6	4	2	11	14	10	1.400	550	520	1.058	Playoffs
3	(Czech Republic) Jihostroj České Budějovice	6	2	4	7	9	13	0.692	499	496	1.006	2012–13 CEV Cup
4	(Montenegro) Budvanska Rivijera Budva	6	1	5	3	6	17	0.353	473	534	0.886	

(H) Host
Notes:

Date	Time		Score		Set 1	Set 2	Set 3	Set 4	Set 5	Total	Report
24 Oct	18:00	Budvanska Rivijera (Montenegro)	0–3	(Russia) Lokomotiv Novosibirsk	18–25	24–26	23–25			65–76	Report
25 Oct	19:30	Berlin Recycling Volleys (Germany)	3–0	(Czech Republic) České Budějovice	27–25	25–22	25–20			77–67	Report
30 Oct	18:00	České Budějovice (Czech Republic)	3–0	(Montenegro) Budvanska Rivijera	27–25	25–18	25–22			77–65	Report
31 Oct	19:00	Lokomotiv Novosibirsk (Russia)	3–1	(Germany) Berlin Recycling Volleys	26–24	25–19	27–29	25–22		103–94	Report
13 Nov	18:00	České Budějovice (Czech Republic)	0–3	(Russia) Lokomotiv Novosibirsk	21–25	17–25	18–25			56–75	Report
13 Nov	19:30	Berlin Recycling Volleys (Germany)	3–1	(Montenegro) Budvanska Rivijera	25–16	20–25	25–19	25–13		95–73	Report
20 Nov	19:00	Lokomotiv Novosibirsk (Russia)	3–1	(Czech Republic) České Budějovice	25–19	23–25	29–27	25–20		102–91	Report
21 Nov	18:00	Budvanska Rivijera (Montenegro)	2–3	(Germany) Berlin Recycling Volleys	25–23	23–25	25–18	20–25	13–15	106–106	Report
4 Dec	19:30	Berlin Recycling Volleys (Germany)	3–1	(Russia) Lokomotiv Novosibirsk	15–25	25–12	25–19	25–19		90–75	Report
5 Dec	18:00	Budvanska Rivijera (Montenegro)	3–2	(Czech Republic) České Budějovice	25–21	22–25	25–23	13–25	15–7	100–101	Report
12 Dec	18:00	České Budějovice (Czech Republic)	3–1	(Germany) Berlin Recycling Volleys	21–25	25–17	25–23	25–23		96–88	Report
12 Dec	19:00	Lokomotiv Novosibirsk (Russia)	3–0	(Montenegro) Budvanska Rivijera	25–22	25–15	29–27			79–64	Report

=== Pool C ===
Pos	Team	Pld	W	L	Pts	SW	SL	SR	SPW	SPL	SPR	Qualification
1	(Italy) Diatec Trentino	6	6	0	18	18	2	9.000	490	411	1.192	Playoffs
2	(Poland) ZAKSA Kędzierzyn-Koźle	6	4	2	12	13	7	1.857	477	421	1.133	Playoffs
3	(France) Tours VB	6	2	4	6	7	12	0.583	414	431	0.961	2012–13 CEV Cup
4	(Serbia) Crvena Zvezda Beograd	6	0	6	0	1	18	0.056	453	375	1.208	

Date	Time		Score		Set 1	Set 2	Set 3	Set 4	Set 5	Total	Report
23 Oct	18:00	ZAKSA Kędzierzyn-Koźle (Poland)	3–0	(France) Tours VB	26–24	25–19	25–16			76–59	Report
25 Oct	20:30	Diatec Trentino (Italy)	3–0	(Serbia) Crvena Zvezda	25–18	25–17	25–20			75–55	Report
30 Oct	20:00	Crvena Zvezda (Serbia)	0–3	(Poland) ZAKSA Kędzierzyn-Koźle	18–25	15–25	19–25			52–75	Report
1 Nov	19:00	Tours VB (France)	0–3	(Italy) Diatec Trentino	19–25	16–25	23–25			58–75	Report
13 Nov	20:00	Crvena Zvezda (Serbia)	0–3	(France) Tours VB	21–25	13–25	18–25			52–75	Report
14 Nov	20:30	Diatec Trentino (Italy)	3–0	(Poland) ZAKSA Kędzierzyn-Koźle	25–22	25–22	25–22			75–66	Report
21 Nov	18:00	ZAKSA Kędzierzyn-Koźle (Poland)	1–3	(Italy) Diatec Trentino	24–26	15–25	25–16	23–25		87–92	Report
22 Nov	20:30	Tours VB (France)	3–0	(Serbia) Crvena Zvezda	25–18	25–15	25–22			75–55	Report
5 Dec	20:30	Diatec Trentino (Italy)	3–0	(France) Tours VB	25–23	25–21	25–16			75–60	Report
6 Dec	18:00	ZAKSA Kędzierzyn-Koźle (Poland)	3–0	(Serbia) Crvena Zvezda	25–23	25–19	25–14			75–56	Report
12 Dec	19:00	Tours VB (France)	1–3	(Poland) ZAKSA Kędzierzyn-Koźle	25–23	18–25	23–25	21–25		87–98	Report
12 Dec	20:00	Crvena Zvezda (Serbia)	1–3	(Italy) Diatec Trentino	18–25	19–25	25–23	23–25		85–98	Report

=== Pool D ===
Pos	Team	Pld	W	L	Pts	SW	SL	SR	SPW	SPL	SPR	Qualification
1	(Italy) Lube Banca Marche Macerata	6	5	1	15	16	3	5.333	461	363	1.270	Playoffs
2	(Slovenia) ACH Volley Ljubljana	6	4	2	13	14	8	1.750	509	463	1.099	Playoffs
3	(Germany) Generali Unterhaching	6	3	3	8	10	13	0.769	506	538	0.941	2012–13 CEV Cup
4	(Belgium) Euphony Asse-Lennik	6	0	6	0	2	18	0.111	380	492	0.772	

Date	Time		Score		Set 1	Set 2	Set 3	Set 4	Set 5	Total	Report
24 Oct	20:30	ACH Volley Ljubljana (Slovenia)	2–3	(Germany) Generali Unterhaching	25–19	22–25	23–25	25–19	15–17	110–105	Report
24 Oct	20:30	Euphony Asse-Lennik (Belgium)	0–3	(Italy) Lube	17–25	22–25	22–25			61–75	Report
31 Oct	19:30	Generali Unterhaching (Germany)	3–1	(Belgium) Euphony Asse-Lennik	23–25	25–23	25–21	25–19		98–88	Report
1 Nov	18:00	Lube (Italy)	3–0	(Slovenia) ACH Volley Ljubljana	26–24	25–13	25–15			76–52	Report
14 Nov	19:30	Generali Unterhaching (Germany)	0–3	(Italy) Lube	20–25	24–26	19–25			63–76	Report
14 Nov	20:30	ACH Volley Ljubljana (Slovenia)	3–0	(Belgium) Euphony Asse-Lennik	25–19	25–15	25–15			75–49	Report
21 Nov	20:30	Lube (Italy)	3–0	(Germany) Generali Unterhaching	25–23	25–15	25–20			75–58	Report
21 Nov	20:30	Euphony Asse-Lennik (Belgium)	0–3	(Slovenia) ACH Volley Ljubljana	14–25	19–25	17–25			50–75	Report
5 Dec	20:30	Euphony Asse-Lennik (Belgium)	1–3	(Germany) Generali Unterhaching	21–25	19–25	25–18	24–26		89–94	Report
5 Dec	20:30	ACH Volley Ljubljana (Slovenia)	3–1	(Italy) Lube	25–23	25–13	22–25	25–23		97–84	Report
12 Dec	19:30	Generali Unterhaching (Germany)	1–3	(Slovenia) ACH Volley Ljubljana	28–30	20–25	25–17	26–28		99–100	Report
12 Dec	20:30	Lube (Italy)	3–0	(Belgium) Euphony Asse-Lennik	25–13	25–10	25–20			75–43	Report

=== Pool E ===
Pos	Team	Pld	W	L	Pts	SW	SL	SR	SPW	SPL	SPR	Qualification
1	(Poland) PGE Skra Bełchatów	6	6	0	18	18	3	6.000	521	420	1.240	Playoffs
2	(Russia) Dynamo Moscow	6	4	2	12	14	8	1.750	519	495	1.048	Playoffs
3	(Romania) Tomis Constanța	6	1	5	4	5	15	0.333	414	473	0.875	
4	(Turkey) Fenerbahçe Grundig Istanbul	6	1	5	2	6	17	0.353	486	552	0.880	

Date	Time		Score		Set 1	Set 2	Set 3	Set 4	Set 5	Total	Report
23 Oct	19:00	Dynamo Moscow (Russia)	3–0	(Romania) Tomis Constanța	25–21	28–26	25–20			78–67	Report
24 Oct	18:00	PGE Skra Bełchatów (Poland)	3–0	(Turkey) Fenerbahçe	25–21	25–14	27–25			77–60	Report
31 Oct	20:00	Fenerbahçe (Turkey)	1–3	(Russia) Dynamo Moscow	18–25	23–25	25–23	21–25		87–98	Report
1 Nov	20:30	Tomis Constanța (Romania)	0–3	(Poland) PGE Skra Bełchatów	20–25	19–25	20–25			59–75	Report
14 Nov	20:30	PGE Skra Bełchatów (Poland)	3–1	(Russia) Dynamo Moscow	25–21	25–16	19–25	25–18		94–80	Report
15 Nov	20:30	Tomis Constanța (Romania)	3–0	(Turkey) Fenerbahçe	25–18	25–23	25–20			75–61	Report
21 Nov	20:00	Fenerbahçe (Turkey)	3–2	(Romania) Tomis Constanța	25–18	24–26	25–23	20–25	15–8	109–100	Report
22 Nov	19:00	Dynamo Moscow (Russia)	1–3	(Poland) PGE Skra Bełchatów	16–25	25–22	25–27	21–25		87–99	Report
5 Dec	18:00	PGE Skra Bełchatów (Poland)	3–0	(Romania) Tomis Constanța	25–23	25–21	25–11			75–55	Report
5 Dec	18:00	Dynamo Moscow (Russia)	3–1	(Turkey) Fenerbahçe	24–26	25–23	27–25	25–16		101–90	Report
12 Dec	19:30	Fenerbahçe (Turkey)	1–3	(Poland) PGE Skra Bełchatów	28–26	17–25	17–25	17–25		79–101	Report
12 Dec	20:30	Tomis Constanța (Romania)	0–3	(Russia) Dynamo Moscow	18–25	22–25	18–25			58–75	Report

=== Pool F ===
Pos	Team	Pld	W	L	Pts	SW	SL	SR	SPW	SPL	SPR	Qualification
1	(Belgium) Noliko Maaseik	6	6	0	17	18	3	6.000	525	441	1.190	Playoffs
2	(Turkey) Arkas İzmir	6	4	2	11	15	12	1.250	597	593	1.007	Playoffs
3	(Bulgaria) Marek Union-Ivkoni Dupnitsa	6	1	5	5	8	16	0.500	516	564	0.915	
4	(Spain) CAI Teruel	6	1	5	3	7	17	0.412	526	566	0.929	

Date	Time		Score		Set 1	Set 2	Set 3	Set 4	Set 5	Total	Report
23 Oct	20:30	Noliko Maaseik (Belgium)	3–0	(Spain) CAI Teruel	27–25	30–28	25–22			82–75	Report
24 Oct	19:00	Arkas İzmir (Turkey)	3–1	(Bulgaria) Marek Union-Ivkoni	25–13	25–19	16–25	25–23		91–80	Report
31 Oct	19:30	Marek Union-Ivkoni (Bulgaria)	0–3	(Belgium) Noliko Maaseik	15–25	23–25	19–25			57–75	Report
31 Oct	20:00	CAI Teruel (Spain)	2–3	(Turkey) Arkas İzmir	25–19	23–25	19–25	25–21	11–15	103–105	Report
13 Nov	19:00	Arkas İzmir (Turkey)	1–3	(Belgium) Noliko Maaseik	25–22	16–25	25–27	17–25		83–99	Report
15 Nov	19:30	Marek Union-Ivkoni (Bulgaria)	3–1	(Spain) CAI Teruel	26–28	25–23	25–20	25–19		101–90	Report
20 Nov	20:30	Noliko Maaseik (Belgium)	3–2	(Turkey) Arkas İzmir	21–25	25–23	25–18	26–28	15–13	112–107	Report
21 Nov	20:15	CAI Teruel (Spain)	3–2	(Bulgaria) Marek Union-Ivkoni	26–28	25–23	20–25	25–19	15–12	111–107	Report
4 Dec	19:00	Arkas İzmir (Turkey)	3–1	(Spain) CAI Teruel	25–19	21–25	25–20	25–23		96–87	Report
4 Dec	20:30	Noliko Maaseik (Belgium)	3–0	(Bulgaria) Marek Union-Ivkoni	25–15	25–14	32–30			82–59	Report
12 Dec	18:00	Marek Union-Ivkoni (Bulgaria)	2–3	(Turkey) Arkas İzmir	26–24	26–28	25–23	23–25	12–15	112–115	Report
12 Dec	20:15	CAI Teruel (Spain)	0–3	(Belgium) Noliko Maaseik	16–25	22–25	22–25			60–75	Raport

=== Pool G ===
Pos	Team	Pld	W	L	Pts	SW	SL	SR	SPW	SPL	SPR	Qualification
1	(Italy) Bre Banca Lannutti Cuneo	6	6	0	18	18	2	9.000	504	414	1.217	Playoffs
2	(Poland) Asseco Resovia	6	4	2	12	13	7	1.857	464	442	1.050	Playoffs
3	(France) Arago de Sète	6	2	4	5	7	14	0.500	439	474	0.926	
4	(Romania) Remat Zalău	6	0	6	1	3	18	0.167	440	517	0.851	

Date	Time		Score		Set 1	Set 2	Set 3	Set 4	Set 5	Total	Report
23 Oct	20:30	Remat Zalău (Romania)	0–3	(Italy) Cuneo	30–32	20–25	18–25			68–82	Report
25 Oct	19:00	Arago de Sète (France)	1–3	(Poland) Asseco Resovia	23–25	22–25	25–13	19–25		89–88	Report
31 Oct	20:30	Cuneo (Italy)	3–0	(France) Arago de Sète	25–17	25–23	25–23			75–63	Report
31 Oct	20:30	Asseco Resovia (Poland)	3–0	(Romania) Remat Zalău	25–17	25–23	25–21			75–61	Report
14 Nov	18:00	Asseco Resovia (Poland)	0–3	(Italy) Cuneo	18–25	23–25	20–25			61–75	Report
15 Nov	20:30	Arago de Sète (France)	3–0	(Romania) Remat Zalău	25–19	25–19	25–22			75–60	Report
20 Nov	20:30	Cuneo (Italy)	3–1	(Poland) Asseco Resovia	25–19	14–25	25–16	29–27		93–87	Report
21 Nov	19:00	Remat Zalău (Romania)	2–3	(France) Arago de Sète	18–25	25–23	22–25	25–16	10–15	100–104	Report
4 Dec	19:00	Remat Zalău (Romania)	0–3	(Poland) Asseco Resovia	24–26	24–26	22–25			70–77	Report
6 Dec	20:30	Arago de Sète (France)	0–3	(Italy) Cuneo	16–25	22–25	16–25			54–75	Report
12 Dec	18:00	Asseco Resovia (Poland)	3–0	(France) Arago de Sète	26–24	25–14	25–16			76–54	Report
12 Dec	20:30	Cuneo (Italy)	3–1	(Romania) Remat Zalău	29–31	25–20	25–12	25–18		104–81	Report

== Playoffs ==
Group	Winners	Second place
A	(Russia) Zenit Kazan	
B	(Russia) Lokomotiv Novosibirsk (F4 Hosts)	(Germany) Berlin Recycling Volleys
C	(Italy) Diatec Trentino	(Poland) ZAKSA Kędzierzyn-Koźle
D	(Italy) Lube Banca Marche Macerata	(Slovenia) ACH Volley Ljubljana
E	(Poland) PGE Skra Bełchatów	(Russia) Dynamo Moscow
F	(Belgium) Noliko Maaseik	(Turkey) Arkas İzmir
G	(Italy) Bre Banca Lannutti Cuneo	(Poland) Asseco Resovia

=== Playoff 12 ===
Team 1	Agg.	Team 2	1st leg	2nd leg	Golden Set
Berlin Recycling Volleys (Germany)	0–2	(Russia) Zenit Kazan	2–3	2–3	
Dynamo Moscow (Russia)	1–1	(Italy) Diatec Trentino	3–2	0–3	15–12
ZAKSA Kędzierzyn-Koźle (Poland)	2–0	(Belgium) Noliko Maaseik	3–0	3–2	
Arkas İzmir (Turkey)	1–1	(Poland) PGE Skra Bełchatów	1–3	3–2	15–12
Asseco Resovia (Poland)	0–2	(Italy) Lube Banca Marche Macerata	0–3	1–3	
ACH Volley Ljubljana (Slovenia)	0–2	(Italy) Bre Banca Lannutti Cuneo	0–3	1–3	

==== First leg ====
Date	Time		Score		Set 1	Set 2	Set 3	Set 4	Set 5	Total	Report
16 Jan	19:30	Berlin Recycling Volleys (Germany)	2–3	(Russia) Zenit Kazan	25–27	25–23	25–17	16–25	16–18	107–110	Report
15 Jan	18:00	Dynamo Moscow (Russia)	3–2	(Italy) Diatec Trentino	25–21	25–23	20–25	17–25	15–12	102–106	Report
16 Jan	20:30	ZAKSA Kędzierzyn-Koźle (Poland)	3–0	(Belgium) Noliko Maaseik	25–16	29–27	27–25			81–68	Report
15 Jan	19:00	Arkas İzmir (Turkey)	1–3	(Poland) PGE Skra Bełchatów	22–25	25–23	20–25	13–25		80–98	Report
15 Jan	20:30	Asseco Resovia (Poland)	0–3	(Italy) Lube	23–25	24–26	19–25			66–76	Report
15 Jan	18:00	ACH Volley Ljubljana (Slovenia)	0–3	(Italy) Cuneo	23–25	17–25	23–25			63–75	Report

==== Second leg ====
Date	Time		Score		Set 1	Set 2	Set 3	Set 4	Set 5	Total	Report
22 Jan	19:00	Zenit Kazan (Russia)	3–2	(Germany) Berlin Recycling Volleys	25–15	21–25	28–30	25–13	16–14	115–97	Report
23 Jan	20:30	Diatec Trentino (Italy)	3–0	(Russia) Dynamo Moscow	25–19	25–18	25–12			75–49	Report
Golden set		Diatec Trentino (Italy)	12–15	(Russia) Dynamo Moscow							
22 Jan	20:30	Noliko Maaseik (Belgium)	2–3	(Poland) ZAKSA Kędzierzyn-Koźle	25–22	18–25	25–18	31–33	13–15	112–113	Report
23 Jan	18:00	PGE Skra Bełchatów (Poland)	2–3	(Turkey) Arkas İzmir	14–25	25–21	22–25	25–18	18–20	104–109	Report
Golden set		PGE Skra Bełchatów (Poland)	12–15	(Turkey) Arkas İzmir							
23 Jan	20:30	Lube (Italy)	3–1	(Poland) Asseco Resovia	25–23	25–18	23–25	25–18		98–84	Report
22 Jan	20:30	Cuneo (Italy)	3–1	(Slovenia) ACH Volley Ljubljana	25–16	25–21	24–26	25–16		99–79	Report

=== Playoff 6 ===
Team 1	Agg.	Team 2	1st leg	2nd leg	Golden Set
Zenit Kazan (Russia)	2–0	(Russia) Dynamo Moscow	3–0	3–0	
ZAKSA Kędzierzyn-Koźle (Poland)	2–0	(Turkey) Arkas İzmir	3–2	3–1	
Lube Banca Marche Macerata (Italy)	1–1	(Italy) Bre Banca Lannutti Cuneo	3–0	2–3	7–15

==== First leg ====
Date	Time		Score		Set 1	Set 2	Set 3	Set 4	Set 5	Total	Report
6 Feb	19:00	Zenit Kazan (Russia)	3–0	(Russia) Dynamo Moscow	25–19	25–22	25–18			75–59	Report
5 Feb	18:00	ZAKSA Kędzierzyn-Koźle (Poland)	3–2	(Turkey) Arkas İzmir	25–19	22–25	25–20	22–25	15–9	109–98	Report
6 Feb	20:30	Lube (Italy)	3–0	(Italy) Cuneo	25–17	25–17	25–22			75–56	Report

==== Second leg ====
Date	Time		Score		Set 1	Set 2	Set 3	Set 4	Set 5	Total	Report
13 Feb	19:00	Dynamo Moscow (Russia)	0–3	(Russia) Zenit Kazan	23–25	18–25	22–25			63–75	Report
12 Feb	19:00	Arkas İzmir (Turkey)	1–3	(Poland) ZAKSA Kędzierzyn-Koźle	23–25	21–25	25–21	19–25		88–96	Report
13 Feb	20:30	Cuneo (Italy)	3–2	(Italy) Lube	25–17	25–19	22–25	21–25	15–8	108–94	Report
Golden set		Cuneo (Italy)	15–7	(Italy) Lube							

== Final Four ==
- Organizer: (Russia) Lokomotiv Novosibirsk
- Place: Omsk
- All times are Omsk Time (UTC+07:00).

Semifinals
16 March
(Italy) Bre Banca Lannutti Cuneo	3
(Poland) ZAKSA Kędzierzyn-Koźle	2
16 March
(Russia) Zenit Kazan	2
(Russia) Lokomotiv Novosibirsk	3

Final
17 March
(Italy) Bre Banca Lannutti Cuneo	2
(Russia) Lokomotiv Novosibirsk	3
3rd place match
17 March
(Poland) ZAKSA Kędzierzyn-Koźle	1
(Russia) Zenit Kazan	3

=== Semifinals ===
Date	Time		Score		Set 1	Set 2	Set 3	Set 4	Set 5	Total	Report
16 Mar	19:30	Bre Banca Lannutti Cuneo (Italy)	3–2	(Poland) ZAKSA Kędzierzyn-Koźle	24–26	25–20	25–20	23–25	15–10	112–101	Report
16 Mar	16:30	Zenit Kazan (Russia)	2–3	(Russia) Lokomotiv Novosibirsk	25–19	20–25	25–22	16–25	12–15	98–106	Report

=== 3rd place match ===
Date	Time		Score		Set 1	Set 2	Set 3	Set 4	Set 5	Total	Report
17 Mar	17:30	ZAKSA Kędzierzyn-Koźle (Poland)	1–3	(Russia) Zenit Kazan	22–25	25–22	20–25	17–25		84–97	Report

=== Final ===
Date	Time		Score		Set 1	Set 2	Set 3	Set 4	Set 5	Total	Report
17 Mar	20:30	Bre Banca Lannutti Cuneo (Italy)	2–3	(Russia) Lokomotiv Novosibirsk	25–22	24–26	23–25	25–20	14–16	111–109	Report

== Final standings ==
Qualified for the 2013 FIVB Club World Championship

Rank	Team
1st place, gold medalist(s)	(Russia) Lokomotiv Novosibirsk
2nd place, silver medalist(s)	(Italy) Bre Banca Lannutti Cuneo
3rd place, bronze medalist(s)	(Russia) Zenit Kazan
4	(Poland) ZAKSA Kędzierzyn-Koźle

2012–13 CEV Champions League winners

1st title

== Awards ==
- Most valuable player
  (Sweden) Marcus Nilsson (Lokomotiv Novosibirsk)
- Best scorer
  (Sweden) Marcus Nilsson (Lokomotiv Novosibirsk)
- Best spiker
  (France) Antonin Rouzier (ZAKSA Kędzierzyn-Koźle)
- Best server
  (Brazil) Luiz Felipe Fonteles (ZAKSA Kędzierzyn-Koźle)
- Best blocker
  (United States) David Lee (Zenit Kazan)
- Best receiver
  (Russia) Yury Berezhko (Zenit Kazan)
- Best libero
  (Italy) Daniele De Pandis (Bre Banca Lannutti Cuneo)
- Best setter
  (Russia) Aleksandr Butko (Lokomotiv Novosibirsk)
