= Marcus Nilsson (volleyball) =

Swedish volleyball player

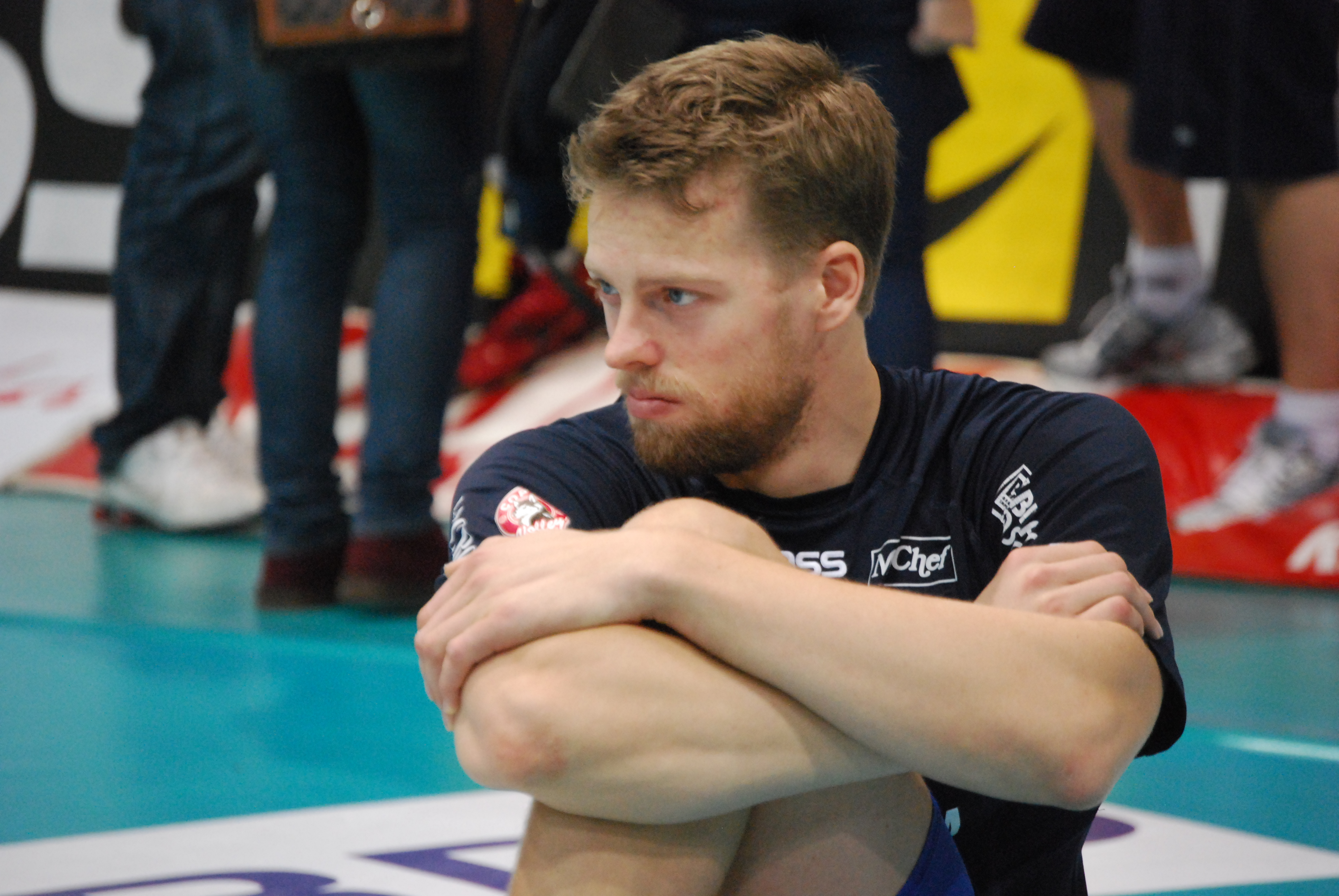

Personal information
- Nationality: (Sweden) Swedish
- Born: 7 October 1982 (age 44); Torup, Sweden
- Height: 2.08 m (6 ft 10 in)
- Weight: 102 kg (225 lb)
- Spike: 360 cm (142 in)
- Block: 350 cm (138 in)

Volleyball information
- Position: Opposite

National team
Sweden

Marcus Nilsson (born 7 October 1982) is a Swedish volleyball player, former member of the Sweden men's national volleyball team. 2013 CEV Champions League winner and named the Most valuable player and Best scorer of the final tournament.

== Sporting achievements ==
=== Clubs ===
- CEV Champions League
  - 2008/2009 – with Iraklis Thessaloniki
  - 2012/2013 – with Lokomotiv Novosibirsk
- National championships
  - 2005/2006 French Championship, with Paris Volley
  - 2006/2007 Greek Championship, with Iraklis Thessaloniki
  - 2007/2008 Greek SuperCup, with Iraklis Thessaloniki
  - 2007/2008 Greek Championship, with Iraklis Thessaloniki
  - 2008/2009 Greek SuperCup, with Iraklis Thessaloniki

=== Individual awards ===
- 2008: Greek Championship – Most valuable player
- 2013: CEV Champions League – Most valuable player
- 2013: CEV Champions League – Best scorer
- 2016: Turkish Championship – Best server
- 2016: Turkish Championship – Best outside hitter
