= Resovia (volleyball) squads =

This article shows the previous rosters of Resovia volleyball team at PlusLiga in Poland.

== 2020/2021 ==
The following is the Asseco Resovia roster in the 2020–21 PlusLiga.

Head coach:	(Italy) Alberto Giuliani
Assistants:	(Poland) Aleh Akhrem, (Italy) Alfredo Martilotti

No.	Name	Date of birth	Height	Weight	Spike	Position
1	(Poland) Bartłomiej Krulicki	15 September 1993	2.05 m (6 ft 9 in)	101 kg (223 lb)	355 cm (140 in)	middle blocker
3	(Italy) Simone Parodi	16 June 1986	1.96 m (6 ft 5 in)	95 kg (209 lb)	350 cm (140 in)	outside hitter
9	(Poland) Nicolas Szerszeń	31 December 1996	1.95 m (6 ft 5 in)	91 kg (201 lb)	343 cm (135 in)	outside hitter
10	(Poland) Damian Domagała	23 April 1998	1.99 m (6 ft 6 in)	82 kg (181 lb)	346 cm (136 in)	opposite
11	(Poland) Fabian Drzyzga (C)	3 January 1990	1.96 m (6 ft 5 in)	95 kg (209 lb)	343 cm (135 in)	setter
12	(Poland) Paweł Woicki	19 June 1983	1.82 m (6 ft 0 in)	84 kg (185 lb)	315 cm (124 in)	setter
13	(Poland) Michał Potera	6 March 1988	1.83 m (6 ft 0 in)	78 kg (172 lb)	323 cm (127 in)	libero
14	(Poland) Rafał Buszek	28 April 1987	1.96 m (6 ft 5 in)	88 kg (194 lb)	348 cm (137 in)	outside hitter
15	(United States) Jeffrey Jendryk	15 September 1995	2.05 m (6 ft 9 in)	90 kg (200 lb)	368 cm (145 in)	middle blocker
16	(Poland) Piotr Hain	26 February 1991	2.07 m (6 ft 9 in)	91 kg (201 lb)	343 cm (135 in)	middle blocker
18	(Slovenia) Klemen Čebulj	21 February 1992	2.03 m (6 ft 8 in)	97 kg (214 lb)	374 cm (147 in)	outside hitter
21	(Poland) Karol Butryn	18 June 1993	1.94 m (6 ft 4 in)	99 kg (218 lb)	345 cm (136 in)	opposite
23	(Poland) Bartosz Mariański	26 May 1992	1.87 m (6 ft 2 in)	76 kg (168 lb)	315 cm (124 in)	libero
24	(Estonia) Robert Täht	15 August 1993	1.92 m (6 ft 4 in)	84 kg (185 lb)	338 cm (133 in)	outside hitter
48	(Estonia) Timo Tammemaa	18 November 1991	2.05 m (6 ft 9 in)	93 kg (205 lb)	365 cm (144 in)	middle blocker

== 2019/2020 ==
The following is the Asseco Resovia roster in the 2019–20 PlusLiga.

Head coach:	(Poland) Piotr Gruszka (2019 – Jan 2020) / (Italy) Emanuele Zanini (Feb 2020 – 2020)
Assistant:	(Poland) Wojciech Serafin

No.	Name	Date of birth	Height	Weight	Spike	Position
1	(Poland) Bartłomiej Krulicki	15 September 1993	2.05 m (6 ft 9 in)	101 kg (223 lb)	355 cm (140 in)	middle blocker
2	(Poland) Grzegorz Kosok (C)	2 March 1986	2.05 m (6 ft 9 in)	95 kg (209 lb)	350 cm (140 in)	middle blocker
3	(Poland) Bartłomiej Lemański	19 March 1996	2.16 m (7 ft 1 in)	104 kg (229 lb)	365 cm (144 in)	middle blocker
4	(Australia) Luke Perry	20 November 1995	1.80 m (5 ft 11 in)	75 kg (165 lb)	331 cm (130 in)	libero
5	(Poland) Marcin Komenda	24 May 1996	1.98 m (6 ft 6 in)	92 kg (203 lb)	345 cm (136 in)	setter
6	(Belgium) Tomas Rousseaux	31 March 1994	1.99 m (6 ft 6 in)	90 kg (200 lb)	360 cm (140 in)	outside hitter
7	(United States) Kawika Shoji	11 November 1987	1.90 m (6 ft 3 in)	79 kg (174 lb)	330 cm (130 in)	setter
8	(Canada) Nicholas Hoag	19 August 1992	2.00 m (6 ft 7 in)	97 kg (214 lb)	350 cm (140 in)	outside hitter
9	(Poland) Zbigniew Bartman	4 May 1987	1.98 m (6 ft 6 in)	97 kg (214 lb)	363 cm (143 in)	opposite
12	(Poland) Tomasz Kalembka	30 June 1991	2.05 m (6 ft 9 in)	103 kg (227 lb)	340 cm (130 in)	middle blocker
13	(Poland) Aleh Akhrem	12 March 1983	1.94 m (6 ft 4 in)	88 kg (194 lb)	349 cm (137 in)	outside hitter
14	(Poland) Rafał Buszek	28 April 1987	1.96 m (6 ft 5 in)	88 kg (194 lb)	348 cm (137 in)	outside hitter
16	(France) Nicolas Marechal	4 March 1987	1.98 m (6 ft 6 in)	94 kg (207 lb)	335 cm (132 in)	outside hitter
17	(Poland) Marcin Możdżonek	9 February 1985	2.11 m (6 ft 11 in)	104 kg (229 lb)	360 cm (140 in)	middle blocker
23	(Poland) Bartosz Mariański	26 May 1992	1.87 m (6 ft 2 in)	76 kg (168 lb)	315 cm (124 in)	libero
77	(Poland) Damian Schulz	26 February 1990	2.08 m (6 ft 10 in)	95 kg (209 lb)	355 cm (140 in)	opposite

== 2018/2019 ==
The following is the Asseco Resovia roster in the 2018–19 PlusLiga.

Head coach:	(Poland) Andrzej Kowal (Dec 2017 – Oct 2018) / (Romania) Gheorghe Crețu (Oct 2018 – 2019)
Assistant:	(Brazil) Lucio Antonio Oro (2017 – Nov 2018) / (Estonia) Alar Rikberg (Nov 2018 – 2019)

No.	Name	Date of birth	Height	Weight	Spike	Position
1	(Poland) Łukasz Kozub	3 November 1997	1.86 m (6 ft 1 in)	88 kg (194 lb)	320 cm (130 in)	setter
2	(United States) Kawika Shoji	11 November 1987	1.90 m (6 ft 3 in)	79 kg (174 lb)	330 cm (130 in)	setter
3	(Poland) Bartłomiej Lemański	19 March 1996	2.16 m (7 ft 1 in)	104 kg (229 lb)	365 cm (144 in)	middle blocker
4	(Australia) Luke Perry	20 November 1995	1.80 m (5 ft 11 in)	75 kg (165 lb)	331 cm (130 in)	libero
5	(France) Rafael Redwitz	12 August 1980	1.88 m (6 ft 2 in)	85 kg (187 lb)	330 cm (130 in)	setter
7	(Poland) Jakub Jarosz	10 February 1987	1.97 m (6 ft 6 in)	91 kg (201 lb)	360 cm (140 in)	opposite
8	(Poland) Damian Schulz	26 February 1990	2.08 m (6 ft 10 in)	95 kg (209 lb)	355 cm (140 in)	opposite
9	(France) Thibault Rossard	28 August 1993	1.93 m (6 ft 4 in)	85 kg (187 lb)	340 cm (130 in)	outside hitter
10	(France) Nicolas Szerszeń	31 December 1996	1.95 m (6 ft 5 in)	91 kg (201 lb)	343 cm (135 in)	outside hitter
12	(Poland) Łukasz Perłowski	3 April 1984	2.04 m (6 ft 8 in)	95 kg (209 lb)	353 cm (139 in)	middle blocker
13	(Poland) Mateusz Masłowski	13 June 1997	1.85 m (6 ft 1 in)	78 kg (172 lb)	330 cm (130 in)	libero
14	(Poland) Rafał Buszek	28 April 1987	1.96 m (6 ft 5 in)	88 kg (194 lb)	348 cm (137 in)	outside hitter
15	(Poland) Mateusz Mika	21 January 1991	2.06 m (6 ft 9 in)	91 kg (201 lb)	352 cm (139 in)	outside hitter
17	(Poland) Marcin Możdżonek (C)	9 February 1985	2.11 m (6 ft 11 in)	104 kg (229 lb)	360 cm (140 in)	middle blocker
18	(Poland) Dawid Dryja	21 July 1992	2.01 m (6 ft 7 in)	96 kg (212 lb)	355 cm (140 in)	middle blocker
20	(United States) David Smith	15 May 1985	2.01 m (6 ft 7 in)	91 kg (201 lb)	348 cm (137 in)	middle blocker

== 2017/2018 ==
The following is the Asseco Resovia roster in the 2017–18 PlusLiga.

Head coach:	(Italy) Roberto Serniotti (2017 – Dec 2017 ) / (Poland) Andrzej Kowal (Dec 2017 – 2018)
Assistants:	(Brazil) Lucio Antonio Oro, (Poland) Marcin Ogonowski

No.	Name	Date of birth	Height	Weight	Spike	Position
1	(Poland) Michał Kędzierski	9 August 1994	1.94 m (6 ft 4 in)	83 kg (183 lb)	345 cm (136 in)	setter
2	(Poland) Paweł Rusek	21 January 1983	1.83 m (6 ft 0 in)	76 kg (168 lb)	315 cm (124 in)	libero
3	(Poland) Bartłomiej Lemański	19 March 1996	2.16 m (7 ft 1 in)	104 kg (229 lb)	365 cm (144 in)	middle blocker
5	(Czech Republic) Lukáš Ticháček	12 January 1982	1.93 m (6 ft 4 in)	95 kg (209 lb)	335 cm (132 in)	setter
6	(Poland) Dominik Depowski	27 October 1995	2.00 m (6 ft 7 in)	95 kg (209 lb)	348 cm (137 in)	outside hitter
7	(Poland) Jakub Jarosz	10 February 1987	1.97 m (6 ft 6 in)	91 kg (201 lb)	360 cm (140 in)	opposite
8	(Finland) Elviss Krastins	15 September 1994	1.92 m (6 ft 4 in)	84 kg (185 lb)	335 cm (132 in)	outside hitter
9	(France) Thibault Rossard	28 August 1993	1.93 m (6 ft 4 in)	85 kg (187 lb)	340 cm (130 in)	outside hitter
10	(Germany) Jochen Schöps (C)	8 October 1983	2.00 m (6 ft 7 in)	103 kg (227 lb)	356 cm (140 in)	opposite
11	(Poland) Aleksander Śliwka	24 May 1995	1.98 m (6 ft 6 in)	83 kg (183 lb)	342 cm (135 in)	outside hitter
12	(Poland) Łukasz Perłowski	3 April 1984	2.04 m (6 ft 8 in)	95 kg (209 lb)	353 cm (139 in)	middle blocker
13	(Poland) Mateusz Masłowski	13 June 1997	1.85 m (6 ft 1 in)	78 kg (172 lb)	330 cm (130 in)	libero
15	(France) Barthélémy Chinenyeze	28 February 1998	2.04 m (6 ft 8 in)	83 kg (183 lb)	360 cm (140 in)	middle blocker
17	(Poland) Marcin Możdżonek	9 February 1985	2.11 m (6 ft 11 in)	104 kg (229 lb)	360 cm (140 in)	middle blocker
18	(Poland) Dawid Dryja	21 July 1992	2.01 m (6 ft 7 in)	96 kg (212 lb)	355 cm (140 in)	middle blocker

== 2016/2017 ==
The following is the Asseco Resovia roster in the 2016–17 PlusLiga.

Head coach:	(Poland) Andrzej Kowal
Assistant:	(Poland) Marcin Ogonowski

No.	Name	Date of birth	Height	Weight	Spike	Position
1	(Poland) Piotr Nowakowski	18 December 1987	2.05 m (6 ft 9 in)	101 kg (223 lb)	360 cm (140 in)	middle blocker
2	(United States) Thomas Jaeschke	4 September 1993	2.00 m (6 ft 7 in)	93 kg (205 lb)	353 cm (139 in)	outside hitter
3	(Poland) Bartłomiej Lemański	19 March 1996	2.16 m (7 ft 1 in)	104 kg (229 lb)	365 cm (144 in)	middle blocker
4	(Canada) John Perrin	17 August 1989	2.01 m (6 ft 7 in)	95 kg (209 lb)	358 cm (141 in)	outside hitter
5	(Czech Republic) Lukáš Ticháček	12 January 1982	1.93 m (6 ft 4 in)	95 kg (209 lb)	335 cm (132 in)	setter
6	(Poland) Dawid Dryja	21 July 1992	2.01 m (6 ft 7 in)	96 kg (212 lb)	355 cm (140 in)	middle blocker
8	(Serbia) Marko Ivović	22 December 1990	1.94 m (6 ft 4 in)	89 kg (196 lb)	365 cm (144 in)	outside hitter
9	(France) Thibault Rossard	28 August 1993	1.93 m (6 ft 4 in)	85 kg (187 lb)	340 cm (130 in)	opposite
10	(Germany) Jochen Schöps (C)	8 October 1983	2.00 m (6 ft 7 in)	103 kg (227 lb)	356 cm (140 in)	opposite
11	(Poland) Fabian Drzyzga	3 January 1990	1.96 m (6 ft 5 in)	95 kg (209 lb)	343 cm (135 in)	setter
12	(Canada) Gavin Schmitt	27 January 1986	2.09 m (6 ft 10 in)	111 kg (245 lb)	370 cm (150 in)	opposite
13	(Poland) Mateusz Masłowski	13 June 1997	1.85 m (6 ft 1 in)	78 kg (172 lb)	330 cm (130 in)	libero
14	(Poland) Dominik Depowski	27 October 1995	2.00 m (6 ft 7 in)	94 kg (207 lb)	350 cm (140 in)	outside hitter
17	(Poland) Marcin Możdżonek	9 February 1985	2.11 m (6 ft 11 in)	104 kg (229 lb)	360 cm (140 in)	middle blocker
18	(Poland) Damian Wojtaszek	7 September 1988	1.80 m (5 ft 11 in)	79 kg (174 lb)	330 cm (130 in)	libero
20	(Canada) Frederic Winters	25 September 1982	1.95 m (6 ft 5 in)	95 kg (209 lb)	343 cm (135 in)	outside hitter

== 2015/2016 ==
The following is the Asseco Resovia roster in the 2015–16 PlusLiga.

Head coach:	(Poland) Andrzej Kowal
Assistant:	(Poland) Marcin Ogonowski

No.	Name	Date of birth	Height	Weight	Spike	Position
1	(Poland) Bartosz Kurek	29 August 1988	2.05 m (6 ft 9 in)	105 kg (231 lb)	375 cm (148 in)	opposite
2	(United States) Thomas Jaeschke	4 September 1993	2.00 m (6 ft 7 in)	93 kg (205 lb)	353 cm (139 in)	outside hitter
4	(Poland) Piotr Nowakowski	18 December 1987	2.05 m (6 ft 9 in)	101 kg (223 lb)	360 cm (140 in)	middle blocker
5	(Czech Republic) Lukáš Ticháček	12 January 1982	1.93 m (6 ft 4 in)	95 kg (209 lb)	335 cm (132 in)	setter
6	(Poland) Dawid Dryja	21 July 1992	2.01 m (6 ft 7 in)	96 kg (212 lb)	355 cm (140 in)	middle blocker
7	(Poland) Aleh Akhrem (C)	12 March 1983	1.94 m (6 ft 4 in)	88 kg (194 lb)	349 cm (137 in)	outside hitter
8	(France) Julien Lyneel	15 April 1990	1.92 m (6 ft 4 in)	85 kg (187 lb)	345 cm (136 in)	outside hitter
9	(Ukraine) Dmytro Pashytskyy	29 November 1987	2.05 m (6 ft 9 in)	100 kg (220 lb)	355 cm (140 in)	middle blocker
10	(Germany) Jochen Schöps	8 October 1983	2.00 m (6 ft 7 in)	103 kg (227 lb)	356 cm (140 in)	opposite
11	(Poland) Fabian Drzyzga	3 January 1990	1.96 m (6 ft 5 in)	95 kg (209 lb)	343 cm (135 in)	setter
12	(Poland) Łukasz Perłowski	3 April 1984	2.04 m (6 ft 8 in)	95 kg (209 lb)	353 cm (139 in)	middle blocker
14	(Poland) Aleksander Śliwka	24 May 1995	1.98 m (6 ft 6 in)	83 kg (183 lb)	342 cm (135 in)	outside hitter
16	(Poland) Krzysztof Ignaczak	15 May 1978	1.88 m (6 ft 2 in)	86 kg (190 lb)	336 cm (132 in)	libero
17	(Bulgaria) Nikolay Penchev	22 May 1992	1.96 m (6 ft 5 in)	90 kg (200 lb)	341 cm (134 in)	outside hitter
18	(Poland) Damian Wojtaszek	7 September 1988	1.80 m (5 ft 11 in)	79 kg (174 lb)	330 cm (130 in)	libero
19	(United States) Russell Holmes	1 July 1982	2.05 m (6 ft 9 in)	95 kg (209 lb)	352 cm (139 in)	middle blocker
20	(Poland) Dominik Witczak	2 January 1983	1.98 m (6 ft 6 in)	105 kg (231 lb)	340 cm (130 in)	opposite

== 2014/2015 ==
The following is the Asseco Resovia roster in the 2014–15 PlusLiga.

Head coach:	(Poland) Andrzej Kowal
Assistant:	(Poland) Marcin Ogonowski

No.	Name	Date of birth	Height	Weight	Spike	Position
2	(United States) Paul Lotman	3 November 1985	2.00 m (6 ft 7 in)	99 kg (218 lb)	345 cm (136 in)	outside hitter
3	(Poland) Michał Żurek	3 June 1988	1.81 m (5 ft 11 in)	81 kg (179 lb)	320 cm (130 in)	libero
4	(Poland) Piotr Nowakowski	18 December 1987	2.05 m (6 ft 9 in)	101 kg (223 lb)	360 cm (140 in)	middle blocker
5	(Czech Republic) Lukáš Ticháček	12 January 1982	1.93 m (6 ft 4 in)	95 kg (209 lb)	335 cm (132 in)	setter
6	(Poland) Dawid Konarski	31 August 1989	1.98 m (6 ft 6 in)	101 kg (223 lb)	355 cm (140 in)	opposite
7	(Poland) Aleh Akhrem (C)	12 March 1983	1.94 m (6 ft 4 in)	88 kg (194 lb)	349 cm (137 in)	outside hitter
8	(Serbia) Marko Ivović	22 December 1990	1.94 m (6 ft 4 in)	89 kg (196 lb)	365 cm (144 in)	outside hitter
10	(Germany) Jochen Schöps	8 October 1983	2.00 m (6 ft 7 in)	103 kg (227 lb)	356 cm (140 in)	opposite
11	(Poland) Fabian Drzyzga	3 January 1990	1.96 m (6 ft 5 in)	95 kg (209 lb)	343 cm (135 in)	setter
12	(Poland) Łukasz Perłowski	3 April 1984	2.04 m (6 ft 8 in)	95 kg (209 lb)	353 cm (139 in)	middle blocker
14	(Poland) Rafał Buszek	28 April 1987	1.96 m (6 ft 5 in)	88 kg (194 lb)	348 cm (137 in)	outside hitter
15	(United States) Russell Holmes	1 July 1982	2.05 m (6 ft 9 in)	95 kg (209 lb)	352 cm (139 in)	middle blocker
16	(Poland) Krzysztof Ignaczak	15 May 1978	1.88 m (6 ft 2 in)	86 kg (190 lb)	336 cm (132 in)	libero
17	(Bulgaria) Nikolay Penchev	22 May 1992	1.96 m (6 ft 5 in)	90 kg (200 lb)	341 cm (134 in)	outside hitter
18	(Poland) Dawid Dryja	21 July 1992	2.01 m (6 ft 7 in)	96 kg (212 lb)	355 cm (140 in)	middle blocker

== 2013/2014 ==
The following is the Asseco Resovia roster in the 2013–14 PlusLiga.

Head coach:	(Poland) Andrzej Kowal
Assistant:	(Poland) Marcin Ogonowski

No.	Name	Date of birth	Height	Weight	Spike	Position
1	(Poland) Dawid Konarski	31 August 1989	1.98 m (6 ft 6 in)	101 kg (223 lb)	355 cm (140 in)	opposite
2	(United States) Paul Lotman	3 November 1985	2.00 m (6 ft 7 in)	99 kg (218 lb)	345 cm (136 in)	outside hitter
3	(Poland) Wojciech Grzyb	4 January 1981	2.05 m (6 ft 9 in)	105 kg (231 lb)	355 cm (140 in)	middle blocker
4	(Poland) Piotr Nowakowski	18 December 1987	2.05 m (6 ft 9 in)	101 kg (223 lb)	360 cm (140 in)	middle blocker
5	(Czech Republic) Lukáš Ticháček	12 January 1982	1.93 m (6 ft 4 in)	95 kg (209 lb)	335 cm (132 in)	setter
6	(Poland) Grzegorz Kosok	2 March 1986	2.05 m (6 ft 9 in)	95 kg (209 lb)	350 cm (140 in)	middle blocker
7	(Poland) Aleh Akhrem (C)	12 March 1983	1.94 m (6 ft 4 in)	88 kg (194 lb)	349 cm (137 in)	outside hitter
10	(Germany) Jochen Schöps	8 October 1983	2.00 m (6 ft 7 in)	103 kg (227 lb)	356 cm (140 in)	opposite
11	(Poland) Fabian Drzyzga	3 January 1990	1.96 m (6 ft 5 in)	95 kg (209 lb)	343 cm (135 in)	setter
12	(Poland) Łukasz Perłowski	3 April 1984	2.04 m (6 ft 8 in)	95 kg (209 lb)	353 cm (139 in)	middle blocker
13	(Hungary) Péter Veres	22 February 1979	2.00 m (6 ft 7 in)	85 kg (187 lb)	350 cm (140 in)	outside hitter
15	(Poland) Mateusz Masłowski	13 June 1997	1.85 m (6 ft 1 in)	78 kg (172 lb)	330 cm (130 in)	libero
16	(Poland) Krzysztof Ignaczak	15 May 1978	1.88 m (6 ft 2 in)	86 kg (190 lb)	336 cm (132 in)	libero
17	(Bulgaria) Nikolay Penchev	22 May 1992	1.96 m (6 ft 5 in)	90 kg (200 lb)	341 cm (134 in)	outside hitter

== 2012/2013 ==
The following is the Asseco Resovia roster in the 2012–13 PlusLiga.

Head coach:	(Poland) Andrzej Kowal
Assistant:	(Poland) Marcin Ogonowski

No.	Name	Date of birth	Height	Weight	Spike	Position
1	(Poland) Maciej Dobrowolski	19 March 1977	1.90 m (6 ft 3 in)	86 kg (190 lb)	326 cm (128 in)	setter
2	(United States) Paul Lotman	3 November 1985	2.00 m (6 ft 7 in)	99 kg (218 lb)	345 cm (136 in)	outside hitter
3	(Poland) Wojciech Grzyb	4 January 1981	2.05 m (6 ft 9 in)	105 kg (231 lb)	355 cm (140 in)	middle blocker
4	(Poland) Piotr Nowakowski	18 December 1987	2.05 m (6 ft 9 in)	101 kg (223 lb)	360 cm (140 in)	middle blocker
5	(Czech Republic) Lukáš Ticháček	12 January 1982	1.93 m (6 ft 4 in)	95 kg (209 lb)	335 cm (132 in)	setter
6	(Poland) Grzegorz Kosok	2 March 1986	2.05 m (6 ft 9 in)	95 kg (209 lb)	350 cm (140 in)	middle blocker
7	(Poland) Aleh Akhrem (C)	12 March 1983	1.94 m (6 ft 4 in)	88 kg (194 lb)	349 cm (137 in)	outside hitter
8	(Poland) Rafał Buszek	28 April 1987	1.96 m (6 ft 5 in)	88 kg (194 lb)	348 cm (137 in)	outside hitter
9	(Poland) Zbigniew Bartman	4 May 1987	1.98 m (6 ft 6 in)	97 kg (214 lb)	363 cm (143 in)	opposite
10	(Germany) Jochen Schöps	8 October 1983	2.00 m (6 ft 7 in)	103 kg (227 lb)	356 cm (140 in)	opposite
11	(Serbia) Nikola Kovačević	14 February 1983	1.91 m (6 ft 3 in)	80 kg (180 lb)	345 cm (136 in)	outside hitter
12	(Poland) Łukasz Perłowski	3 April 1984	2.04 m (6 ft 8 in)	95 kg (209 lb)	353 cm (139 in)	middle blocker
13	(Poland) Jakub Woś	9 March 1993	1.82 m (6 ft 0 in)	80 kg (180 lb)	329 cm (130 in)	libero
16	(Poland) Krzysztof Ignaczak	15 May 1978	1.88 m (6 ft 2 in)	86 kg (190 lb)	336 cm (132 in)	libero

== 2011/2012 ==
The following is the Asseco Resovia roster in the 2011–12 PlusLiga.

Head coach:	(Poland) Andrzej Kowal
Assistant:	(Poland) Marcin Ogonowski

No.	Name	Date of birth	Height	Weight	Spike	Position
1	(Poland) Maciej Dobrowolski	19 March 1977	1.90 m (6 ft 3 in)	86 kg (190 lb)	326 cm (128 in)	setter
2	(United States) Paul Lotman	3 November 1985	2.00 m (6 ft 7 in)	99 kg (218 lb)	345 cm (136 in)	outside hitter
3	(Poland) Wojciech Grzyb	4 January 1981	2.05 m (6 ft 9 in)	105 kg (231 lb)	355 cm (140 in)	middle blocker
4	(Poland) Piotr Nowakowski	18 December 1987	2.05 m (6 ft 9 in)	101 kg (223 lb)	360 cm (140 in)	middle blocker
5	(Czech Republic) Lukáš Ticháček	12 January 1982	1.93 m (6 ft 4 in)	95 kg (209 lb)	335 cm (132 in)	setter
7	(Poland) Aleh Akhrem (C)	12 March 1983	1.94 m (6 ft 4 in)	88 kg (194 lb)	349 cm (137 in)	outside hitter
8	(Montenegro) Marko Bojić	13 November 1988	2.01 m (6 ft 7 in)	82 kg (181 lb)	359 cm (141 in)	outside hitter
9	(Germany) György Grozer	27 November 1984	2.00 m (6 ft 7 in)	99 kg (218 lb)	374 cm (147 in)	opposite
12	(Poland) Łukasz Perłowski	3 April 1984	2.04 m (6 ft 8 in)	95 kg (209 lb)	353 cm (139 in)	middle blocker
14	(Romania) Adrian Radu Gontariu	14 May 1984	2.05 m (6 ft 9 in)	100 kg (220 lb)	349 cm (137 in)	opposite
15	(Poland) Mateusz Mika	21 January 1991	2.06 m (6 ft 9 in)	91 kg (201 lb)	352 cm (139 in)	outside hitter
16	(Poland) Krzysztof Ignaczak	15 May 1978	1.88 m (6 ft 2 in)	86 kg (190 lb)	336 cm (132 in)	libero
17	(Poland) Tomasz Głód	26 January 1992	0 m (0 in)	0 kg (0 lb)	0 cm (0 in)	libero
18	(Poland) Grzegorz Kosok	2 March 1986	2.05 m (6 ft 9 in)	95 kg (209 lb)	350 cm (140 in)	middle blocker
19	(Poland) Dawid Dryja	21 July 1992	2.01 m (6 ft 7 in)	96 kg (212 lb)	355 cm (140 in)	middle blocker
