= 2017–18 Asseco Resovia Rzeszów season =

Asseco Resovia Rzeszów
2017–18 season
- Chairman: Bartosz Górski

Asseco Resovia Rzeszów 2017–2018 season is the 2017/2018 volleyball season for Polish professional volleyball club Asseco Resovia Rzeszów.

The club competes in:

- Polish Championship
- Polish Cup
- CEV Cup

On December 3, 2017, Asseco Resovia announced the information about terminating the contract with head coach Roberto Serniotti. The unofficial reason was the low results after 12 rounds of league. His duties were taken over by a former head coach Andrzej Kowal.

== Team roster ==
Head coach:	Roberto Serniotti (2017–Dec 2017 ) / Andrzej Kowal (Dec 2017–2018)
Assistant:	Lucio Antonio Oro

No.	Name	Date of birth	Position
1	(Poland) Michał Kędzierski	August 9, 1994 (age 31)	setter
2	(Poland) Paweł Rusek	January 21, 1983 (age 43)	libero
3	(Poland) Bartłomiej Lemański	March 19, 1996 (age 30)	middle blocker
5	(Czech Republic) Lukáš Ticháček	January 12, 1982 (age 44)	setter
6	(Poland) Dominik Depowski	October 27, 1995 (age 30)	outside hitter
7	(Poland) Jakub Jarosz	February 10, 1987 (age 39)	opposite
8	(Finland) Elviss Krastins	September 15, 1994 (age 31)	outside hitter
9	(France) Thibault Rossard	August 28, 1993 (age 32)	outside hitter
10	(Germany) Jochen Schöps (C)	October 8, 1983 (age 42)	opposite
11	(Poland) Aleksander Śliwka	May 24, 1995 (age 30)	outside hitter
12	(Poland) Łukasz Perłowski	April 3, 1984 (age 41)	middle blocker
13	(Poland) Mateusz Masłowski	June 13, 1997 (age 28)	libero
17	(Poland) Marcin Możdżonek	February 9, 1985 (age 41)	middle blocker
18	(Poland) Dawid Dryja	July 21, 1992 (age 33)	middle blocker

== Squad changes for the 2017–2018 season ==
In:

No.	Player	Position	From
1	(Poland) Michał Kędzierski	setter	Cerrad Czarni Radom
2	(Poland) Paweł Rusek	libero	Cuprum Lubin
6	(Poland) Dominik Depowski	outside hitter	Espadon Szczecin
7	(Poland) Jakub Jarosz	opposite	El Jaish
8	(Finland) Elviss Krastins	outside hitter	Topvolley Antwerpen
11	(Poland) Aleksander Śliwka	outside hitter	Indykpol AZS Olsztyn
12	(Poland) Łukasz Perłowski	middle blocker	Espadon Szczecin

Out:

No.	Player	Position	To
	(Poland) Andrzej Kowal	head coach
2	(United States) Thomas Jaeschke	outside hitter	Calzedonia Verona
4	(Poland) Piotr Nowakowski	middle blocker	Lotos Trefl Gdańsk
8	(Serbia) Marko Ivović	outside hitter	Funvic Taubaté
11	(Poland) Fabian Drzyzga	setter	Olympiacos Piraeus
12	(Canada) Gavin Schmitt	opposite	Toray Arrows
18	(Poland) Damian Wojtaszek	libero	ONICO Warszawa
20	(Canada) Frederic Winters	outside hitter
