= 2014–15 Asseco Resovia Rzeszów season =

Asseco Resovia Rzeszów
2014–15 season
- Chairman: Marek Panek
- Manager: Andrzej Kowal

Asseco Resovia Rzeszów 2014–2015 season is the 2014/2015 volleyball season for Polish professional volleyball club Asseco Resovia Rzeszów.

The club competes in:

- Polish Championship
- Polish Cup
- CEV Champions League

== Team Roster Season 2014-2015 ==
Head coach: (Poland) Andrzej Kowal

No.	Name	Date of birth	Position
2	(United States) Paul Lotman	November 3, 1985	outside hitter
3	(Poland) Michał Żurek	June 3, 1988	libero
4	(Poland) Piotr Nowakowski	December 18, 1987	middle blocker
5	(Czech Republic) Lukáš Ticháček	January 12, 1982	setter
6	(Poland) Dawid Konarski	August 31, 1989	opposite
7	(Belarus) (Poland) Olieg Achrem (C)	March 12, 1983	outside hitter
8	(Serbia) Marko Ivović	December 22, 1990	outside hitter
10	(Germany) Jochen Schöps	October 8, 1983	opposite
11	(Poland) Fabian Drzyzga	January 3, 1990	setter
12	(Poland) Łukasz Perłowski	April 3, 1984	middle blocker
14	(Poland) Rafał Buszek	April 28, 1987	outside hitter
15	(United States) Russell Holmes	July 1, 1982	middle blocker
16	(Poland) Krzysztof Ignaczak	May 15, 1978	libero
17	(Bulgaria) Nikolay Penchev	May 22, 1992	outside hitter
18	(Poland) Dawid Dryja	July 21, 1992	middle blocker

== Squad changes for the 2014–2015 season ==
In:

No.	Player	Position	From
3	(Poland) Michał Żurek	libero	Indykpol AZS Olsztyn
8	(Serbia) Marko Ivović	outside hitter	Paris Volley
14	(Poland) Rafał Buszek	outside hitter	Indykpol AZS Olsztyn
15	(United States) Russell Holmes	middle blocker	Büyükşehir İstanbul

Out:

No.	Player	Position	To
3	(Poland) Wojciech Grzyb	middle blocker	Lotos Trefl Gdańsk
6	(Poland) Grzegorz Kosok	middle blocker	Jastrzębski Węgiel
9	(Poland) Michał Filip	opposite	AZS Politechnika Warszawska
13	(Hungary) Péter Veres	outside hitter	Al Rayan

== Most Valuable Players ==
=== PlusLiga ===
==== General classification ====
No.	Player	MVP
1.	(Germany) Jochen Schops	6
	(Poland) Fabian Drzyzga	6
3.	(Bulgaria) Nikolay Penchev	5
4.	(Serbia) Marko Ivović	4
	(Poland) Rafał Buszek	4
6.	(Poland) Piotr Nowakowski	2
	(Poland) Dawid Konarski	2
7.	(Poland) Michał Żurek	1

== Results, schedules and standings ==
=== 2014–15 PlusLiga ===
==== Regular season ====
6 October 2014; 18:00	Cuprum Lubin	1–3	Asseco Resovia Rzeszów	HWS RCS, Lubin; Attendance: 3,400; Referees: Burkiewicz Paweł - Kolendowski Maciej
6 October 2014; 18:00	(20–25, 25–20, 17–25, 17–25) MVP: Rafał Buszek			HWS RCS, Lubin; Attendance: 3,400; Referees: Burkiewicz Paweł - Kolendowski Maciej

11 October 2014; 17:00	Asseco Resovia Rzeszów	3–0	BBT Bielsko-Biała	Podpromie Hall, Rzeszów; Attendance: 4,000; Referees: Flis Tomasz - Burkiewicz Paweł
11 October 2014; 17:00	(25–15, 25–23, 25–19) MVP: Rafał Buszek			Podpromie Hall, Rzeszów; Attendance: 4,000; Referees: Flis Tomasz - Burkiewicz Paweł

15 October 2014; 18:00	Asseco Resovia Rzeszów	3–1	MKS Banimex Będzin	Podpromie Hall, Rzeszów; Attendance: Herbik Marcin - Janik Tomasz; Referees: 3,900
15 October 2014; 18:00	(19–25, 25–23, 26–24, 25–16) MVP: Fabian Drzyzga			Podpromie Hall, Rzeszów; Attendance: Herbik Marcin - Janik Tomasz; Referees: 3,900

18 October 2014; 14:45	Asseco Resovia Rzeszów	3–2	Jastrzębski Węgiel	Podpromie Hall, Rzeszów; Attendance: 4,500; Referees: Twardowski Maciej - Szmydyński Krzysztof
18 October 2014; 14:45	(25–27, 25–15, 18–25, 25–22, 15–12) MVP: Nikolay Penchev			Podpromie Hall, Rzeszów; Attendance: 4,500; Referees: Twardowski Maciej - Szmydyński Krzysztof

22 October 2014; 20:30	ZAKSA Kędzierzyn-Koźle	0–3	Asseco Resovia Rzeszów	Azoty Hall, Kędzierzyn-Koźle; Attendance: 2,500; Referees: Skowroński Piotr - Maciejewski Maciej
22 October 2014; 20:30	(26–28, 23–25, 18–25) MVP: Rafał Buszek			Azoty Hall, Kędzierzyn-Koźle; Attendance: 2,500; Referees: Skowroński Piotr - Maciejewski Maciej

25 October 2014; 15:00	Asseco Resovia Rzeszów	3–0	Indykpol AZS Olsztyn	Podpromie Hall, Rzeszów; Attendance: 4,200; Referees: Kolendowski Maciej - Flis Tomasz
25 October 2014; 15:00	(25–20, 25–16, 29–27) MVP: Marko Ivović			Podpromie Hall, Rzeszów; Attendance: 4,200; Referees: Kolendowski Maciej - Flis Tomasz

29 October 2014; 19:00	AZS Politechnika Warszawska	0–3	Asseco Resovia Rzeszów	Torwar Hall, Warsaw; Attendance: 4,000; Referees: Skowroński Piotr - Heyducki Marek
29 October 2014; 19:00	(18–25, 17–25, 19–25) MVP: Fabian Drzyzga			Torwar Hall, Warsaw; Attendance: 4,000; Referees: Skowroński Piotr - Heyducki Marek

9 November 2014; 17:00	Cerrad Czarni Radom	1–3	Asseco Resovia Rzeszów	Hala MOSiR, Radom; Attendance: 1,300; Referees: Kuchna Andrzej - Król Piotr
9 November 2014; 17:00	(26–28, 25–19, 21–25, 26–28) MVP: Piotr Nowakowski			Hala MOSiR, Radom; Attendance: 1,300; Referees: Kuchna Andrzej - Król Piotr

12 November 2014; 18:00	Effector Kielce	1–3	Asseco Resovia Rzeszów	Legionów Hall, Kielce; Attendance: 3,000; Referees: Herbik Marcin - Twardowski Maciej
12 November 2014; 18:00	(13–25, 20–25, 25–22, 19–25) MVP: Dawid Konarski			Legionów Hall, Kielce; Attendance: 3,000; Referees: Herbik Marcin - Twardowski Maciej

15 November 2014; 14:45	Asseco Resovia Rzeszów	3–0	Transfer Bydgoszcz	Podpromie Hall, Rzeszów; Attendance: 4,400; Referees: Budzik Marek - Niemczura Waldemar
15 November 2014; 14:45	(25–18, 25–22, 25–20) MVP: Jochen Schops			Podpromie Hall, Rzeszów; Attendance: 4,400; Referees: Budzik Marek - Niemczura Waldemar

23 November 2014; 18:00	Lotos Trefl Gdańsk	3–2	Asseco Resovia Rzeszów	Ergo Arena, Gdańsk; Attendance: 4,500; Referees: Twardowski Maciej - Herbik Marcin
23 November 2014; 18:00	(25–20, 22–25, 25–16, 14–25, 17–15) MVP: Murphy Troy			Ergo Arena, Gdańsk; Attendance: 4,500; Referees: Twardowski Maciej - Herbik Marcin

26 November 2014; 18:00	Asseco Resovia Rzeszów	3–0	AZS Częstochowa	Podpromie Hall, Rzeszów; Attendance: 4,000; Referees: Ignatowicz Paweł - Flis Tomasz
26 November 2014; 18:00	(25–17, 25–16, 25–22) MVP: Nikolay Penchev			Podpromie Hall, Rzeszów; Attendance: 4,000; Referees: Ignatowicz Paweł - Flis Tomasz

30 November 2014; 14:45	PGE Skra Bełchatów	3–0	Asseco Resovia Rzeszów	Atlas Arena, Łódź; Attendance: 11,000; Referees: Lagierski Marek - Król Piotr
30 November 2014; 14:45	(25–19, 25–20, 25–20) MVP: Nicolas Uriarte			Atlas Arena, Łódź; Attendance: 11,000; Referees: Lagierski Marek - Król Piotr

7 December 2014; 14:45	Asseco Resovia Rzeszów	2–3	Cuprum Lubin	Podpromie Hall, Rzeszów; Attendance: 4,000; Referees: Król Piotr - Budzik Marek
7 December 2014; 14:45	(19–25, 23–25, 25–15, 25–15, 13–15) MVP: Szymon Romać			Podpromie Hall, Rzeszów; Attendance: 4,000; Referees: Król Piotr - Budzik Marek

12 December 2014; 18:00	BBTS Bielsko-Biała	1–3	Asseco Resovia Rzeszów	Dębowiec Sports Arena, Bielsko-Biała; Attendance: 2,000; Referees: Flis Tomasz - Kolendowski Maciej
12 December 2014; 18:00	(20–25, 20–25, 25–23, 23–25) MVP: Marko Ivović			Dębowiec Sports Arena, Bielsko-Biała; Attendance: 2,000; Referees: Flis Tomasz - Kolendowski Maciej

20 December 2014; 18:00	MKS Banimex Będzin	0–3	Asseco Resovia Rzeszów	Hala Widowiskowo Sportowa, Sosnowiec; Attendance: 1,300; Referees: Twardowski Maciej - Janik Tomasz
20 December 2014; 18:00	(18–25, 17–25, 22–25) MVP: Jochen Schops			Hala Widowiskowo Sportowa, Sosnowiec; Attendance: 1,300; Referees: Twardowski Maciej - Janik Tomasz

28 December 2014; 17:00	Jastrzębski Węgiel	0–3	Asseco Resovia Rzeszów	Hala Sportowa, Jastrzębie-Zdrój; Attendance: 3,000; Referees: Jasiński Dariusz - Herbik Marcin
28 December 2014; 17:00	(24–26, 20–25, 10–25) MVP: Nikolay Penchev			Hala Sportowa, Jastrzębie-Zdrój; Attendance: 3,000; Referees: Jasiński Dariusz - Herbik Marcin

4 January 2015; 14:45	Asseco Resovia Rzeszów	3–0	ZAKSA Kędzierzyn-Koźle	Podpromie Hall, Rzeszów; Attendance: 4,300; Referees: Burkiewicz Paweł - Maroszek Wojciech
4 January 2015; 14:45	(25–13, 25–22, 25–12) MVP: Marko Ivović			Podpromie Hall, Rzeszów; Attendance: 4,300; Referees: Burkiewicz Paweł - Maroszek Wojciech

10 January 2015; 14:00	Indykpol AZS Olsztyn	3–2	Asseco Resovia Rzeszów	Urania Hall, Olsztyn; Attendance: 1,800; Referees: Skowroński Piotr - Heyducki Marek
10 January 2015; 14:00	(25–23, 25–15, 21–25, 19–25, 15–10) MVP: Grzegorz Szymański			Urania Hall, Olsztyn; Attendance: 1,800; Referees: Skowroński Piotr - Heyducki Marek

17 January 2015; 14:45	Asseco Resovia Rzeszów	3–1	AZS Politechnika Warszawska	Podpromie Hall, Rzeszów; Attendance: 4,100; Referees: Niemczura Waldemar - Lagierski Marek
17 January 2015; 14:45	(25–15, 21–25, 25–19, 25–14) MVP: Jochen Schops			Podpromie Hall, Rzeszów; Attendance: 4,100; Referees: Niemczura Waldemar - Lagierski Marek

24 January 2015; 14:45	Asseco Resovia Rzeszów	3–2	Cerrad Czarni Radom	Podpromie Hall, Rzeszów; Attendance: 4,200; Referees: Ignatowicz Paweł - Budzik Marek
24 January 2015; 14:45	(23–25, 26–24, 19–25, 25–14, 15–12) MVP: Piotr Nowakowski			Podpromie Hall, Rzeszów; Attendance: 4,200; Referees: Ignatowicz Paweł - Budzik Marek

31 January 2015; 16:00	Asseco Resovia Rzeszów	3–1	Effector Kielce	Podpromie Hall, Rzeszów; Attendance: 3,900; Referees: Niemczura Waldemar - Król Piotr
31 January 2015; 16:00	(25–21, 28–30, 25–16, 25–18) MVP: Michał Żurek			Podpromie Hall, Rzeszów; Attendance: 3,900; Referees: Niemczura Waldemar - Król Piotr

4 February 2015; 18:00	Transfer Bydgoszcz	1–3	Asseco Resovia Rzeszów	Łuczniczka, Bydgoszcz; Attendance: 5,000; Referees: Lagierski Marek - Maroszek Wojciech
4 February 2015; 18:00	(24–26, 25–21, 23–25, 21–25) MVP: Marko Ivović			Łuczniczka, Bydgoszcz; Attendance: 5,000; Referees: Lagierski Marek - Maroszek Wojciech

7 February 2015; 17:30	Asseco Resovia Rzeszów	3–1	Lotos Trefl Gdańsk	Podpromie Hall, Rzeszów; Attendance: 4,300; Referees: Maroszek Wojciech - Lagierski Marek
7 February 2015; 17:30	(25–19, 25–22, 19–25, 26–24) MVP: Nikolay Penchev			Podpromie Hall, Rzeszów; Attendance: 4,300; Referees: Maroszek Wojciech - Lagierski Marek

14 February 2015; 17:00	AZS Częstochowa	0–3	Asseco Resovia Rzeszów	Hala Sportowa 'Częstochowa', Częstochowa; Attendance: 1,800; Referees: Sokół Katarzyna - Burkiewicz Paweł
14 February 2015; 17:00	(23–25, 21–25, 23–25) MVP: Jochen Schops			Hala Sportowa 'Częstochowa', Częstochowa; Attendance: 1,800; Referees: Sokół Katarzyna - Burkiewicz Paweł

21 February 2015; 14:45	Asseco Resovia Rzeszów	3–1	PGE Skra Bełchatów	Podpromie Hall, Rzeszów; Attendance: 4,300; Referees: Twardowski Maciej - Burkiewicz Paweł
21 February 2015; 14:45	(23–25, 37–35, 25–23, 25–15) MVP: Fabian Drzyzga			Podpromie Hall, Rzeszów; Attendance: 4,300; Referees: Twardowski Maciej - Burkiewicz Paweł

==== Quarterfinal ====
25 February 2015; 18:00	Cerrad Czarni Radom	2–3	Asseco Resovia Rzeszów	Hala MOSiR, Radom; Attendance: 1,500; Referees: Maciejewski Maciej - Broński Jacek
25 February 2015; 18:00	(25–23, 24–26, 23–25, 25–20, 11–15) MVP: Nikolay Penchev			Hala MOSiR, Radom; Attendance: 1,500; Referees: Maciejewski Maciej - Broński Jacek

28 February 2015; 17:00	Asseco Resovia Rzeszów	3–0	Cerrad Czarni Radom	Podpromie Hall, Rzeszów; Attendance: 4,300; Referees: Król Piotr - Kuchna Andrzej
28 February 2015; 17:00	(25–13, 25–16, 25–21) MVP: Jochen Schops			Podpromie Hall, Rzeszów; Attendance: 4,300; Referees: Król Piotr - Kuchna Andrzej

==== Semifinal ====
8 March 2016; 14:45	Asseco Resovia Rzeszów	3–1	Jastrzębski Węgiel	Podpromie Hall, Rzeszów; Attendance: 4,300; Referees: Twardowski Maciej - Burkiewicz Paweł
8 March 2016; 14:45	(25–16, 22–25, 25–20, 25–21) MVP: Jochen Schops			Podpromie Hall, Rzeszów; Attendance: 4,300; Referees: Twardowski Maciej - Burkiewicz Paweł

17 March 2016; 20:30	Jastrzębski Węgiel	1–3	Asseco Resovia Rzeszów	Hala Sportowa, Jastrzębie-Zdrój; Attendance: 2,550; Referees: Kolendowski Maciej - Flis Tomasz
17 March 2016; 20:30	(34–32, 18–25, 16–25, 22–25) MVP: Fabian Drzyzga			Hala Sportowa, Jastrzębie-Zdrój; Attendance: 2,550; Referees: Kolendowski Maciej - Flis Tomasz

20 March 2016; 18:00	Asseco Resovia Rzeszów	3–1	Jastrzębski Węgiel	Podpromie Hall, Rzeszów; Attendance: 4,300; Referees: Skowroński Piotr - Broński Jacek
20 March 2016; 18:00	(28–26, 25–18, 20–25, 25–23) MVP: Fabian Drzyzga			Podpromie Hall, Rzeszów; Attendance: 4,300; Referees: Skowroński Piotr - Broński Jacek

==== Finale ====
15 April 2015; 20:00	Asseco Resovia Rzeszów	3–0	Lotos Trefl Gdańsk	Podpromie Hall, Rzeszów; Attendance: 4,300; Referees: Lagierski Marek - Maroszek Wojciech
15 April 2015; 20:00	(25–22, 25–20, 25–23) MVP: Fabian Drzyzga			Podpromie Hall, Rzeszów; Attendance: 4,300; Referees: Lagierski Marek - Maroszek Wojciech

24 April 2015; 18:00	Lotos Trefl Gdańsk	2–3	Asseco Resovia Rzeszów	Ergo Arena, Gdańsk; Attendance: 10,169; Referees: Twardowski Maciej - Pindral Szymon
24 April 2015; 18:00	(25–19, 19–25, 21–25, 25–23, 13–15) MVP: Rafał Buszek			Ergo Arena, Gdańsk; Attendance: 10,169; Referees: Twardowski Maciej - Pindral Szymon

28 April 2015; 20:00	Asseco Resovia Rzeszów	3–1	Lotos Trefl Gdańsk	Podpromie Hall, Rzeszów; Attendance: 4,300; Referees: Burkiewicz Paweł - Flis Tomasz
28 April 2015; 20:00	(19–25, 25–19, 27–25, 25–18) MVP: Dawid Konarski			Podpromie Hall, Rzeszów; Attendance: 4,300; Referees: Burkiewicz Paweł - Flis Tomasz

=== 2014–15 Polish Cup ===
==== Quarterfinal ====
7 January 2015; 18:00	Asseco Resovia Rzeszów	3–0	AZS Politechnika Warszawska	Podpromie Hall, Rzeszów; Referees: Pindral - Burkiewicz
7 January 2015; 18:00	(25–17, 26–24, 25–19)			Podpromie Hall, Rzeszów; Referees: Pindral - Burkiewicz

==== Semifinal ====
18 April 2015; 17:30	Asseco Resovia Rzeszów	3–1	Jastrzębski Węgiel	Ergo Arena, Gdańsk; Referees: Skowroński - Heyducki
18 April 2015; 17:30	(19–25, 25–18, 25–20, 25–20)			Ergo Arena, Gdańsk; Referees: Skowroński - Heyducki

==== Finale ====
19 April 2015; 13:30	Lotos Trefl Gdańsk	3–1	Asseco Resovia Rzeszów	Ergo Arena, Gdańsk; Referees: Herbik Marcin - Janik Tomasz
19 April 2015; 13:30	(25–22, 21–25, 25–21, 25–23)			Ergo Arena, Gdańsk; Referees: Herbik Marcin - Janik Tomasz

=== 2014–15 CEV Champions League ===
==== Pool C ====
4 November 2015; 18:00	Asseco Resovia Rzeszów (Poland)	3–0	(Montenegro) Budvanska Rivijera Budva	Podpromie Hall, Rzeszów; Attendance: 4,300; Referees: SALTALIPPI Fabrizio - PIASETSKI Aliaksandr
4 November 2015; 18:00	(25–22, 25–15, 25–18)			Podpromie Hall, Rzeszów; Attendance: 4,300; Referees: SALTALIPPI Fabrizio - PIASETSKI Aliaksandr

19 November 2015; 20:00	ACH Volley Ljubljana (Slovenia)	0–3	(Poland) Asseco Resovia Rzeszów	Tivoli Hall, Ljubljana; Attendance: 1,100; Referees: SZABO-ALEXI Paul Catalin - YENER Aziz
19 November 2015; 20:00	(19–25, 23–25, 19–25)			Tivoli Hall, Ljubljana; Attendance: 1,100; Referees: SZABO-ALEXI Paul Catalin - YENER Aziz

4 December 2015; 18:00	Asseco Resovia Rzeszów (Poland)	0–3	(Germany) Berlin Recycling Volleys	Podpromie Hall, Rzeszów; Attendance: 4,257; Referees: HODON Dusan - KOVALCHUK Andrii
4 December 2015; 18:00	(25–16, 25–22, 25–19)			Podpromie Hall, Rzeszów; Attendance: 4,257; Referees: HODON Dusan - KOVALCHUK Andrii

18 December 2015; 19:30	Berlin Recycling Volleys (Germany)	2–3	(Poland) Asseco Resovia Rzeszów	Max-Schmeling-Halle, Berlin; Attendance: 6,489; Referees: SCHÜRMANN Philippe - SATANASSI Omero
18 December 2015; 19:30	(19–25, 20–25, 25–21, 25–17, 10–15)			Max-Schmeling-Halle, Berlin; Attendance: 6,489; Referees: SCHÜRMANN Philippe - SATANASSI Omero

21 December 2015; 18:00	Asseco Resovia Rzeszów (Poland)	3–0	(Slovenia) ACH Volley Ljubljana	Podpromie Hall, Rzeszów; Attendance: 3,856; Referees: CINATL Rene - OLEYNIK Vladimir
21 December 2015; 18:00	(25–19, 25–12, 25–16)			Podpromie Hall, Rzeszów; Attendance: 3,856; Referees: CINATL Rene - OLEYNIK Vladimir

27 January 2016; 18:00	Budvanska Rivijera Budva (Montenegro)	0–3	(Poland) Asseco Resovia Rzeszów	Mediteranski Sportski Centar, Budva; Attendance: 400; Referees: VOUDOURIS Konstantinos - GUILLET Olivier
27 January 2016; 18:00	(23–25, 19–25, 21–25)			Mediteranski Sportski Centar, Budva; Attendance: 400; Referees: VOUDOURIS Konstantinos - GUILLET Olivier

==== Playoff 12 ====
11 February 2015; 20:00	VfB Friedrichshafen (Germany)	2–3	(Poland) Asseco Resovia Rzeszów	ZF Arena, Friedrichshafen; Attendance: 2,200; Referees: HOSNUT Onur - RAPISARDA Daniele
11 February 2015; 20:00	(25–19, 24–26, 25–20, 17–25, 15–17)			ZF Arena, Friedrichshafen; Attendance: 2,200; Referees: HOSNUT Onur - RAPISARDA Daniele

18 February 2015; 20:30	Asseco Resovia Rzeszów (Poland)	3–1	(Germany) VfB Friedrichshafen	Podpromie Hall, Rzeszów; Attendance: 4,253; Referees: MEDVID Mykhaylo - NEDERHOED Jacobus
18 February 2015; 20:30	(25–18, 25–16, 22–25, 25–17)			Podpromie Hall, Rzeszów; Attendance: 4,253; Referees: MEDVID Mykhaylo - NEDERHOED Jacobus

==== Playoff 6 ====
4 March 2015; 19:00	Lokomotiv Novosibirsk (Russia)	1–3	(Poland) Asseco Resovia Rzeszów	SKK Sever, Novosibirsk; Attendance: 1,200; Referees: PIASETSKI Aliaksandr - IVANOV Ivaylo
4 March 2015; 19:00	(25–20, 21–25, 27–29, 17–25)			SKK Sever, Novosibirsk; Attendance: 1,200; Referees: PIASETSKI Aliaksandr - IVANOV Ivaylo

11 March 2015; 20:30	Asseco Resovia Rzeszów (Poland)	2–3	(Russia) Lokomotiv Novosibirsk	Podpromie Hall, Rzeszów; Attendance: 4,512; Referees: HUHTANISKA Ahti - SKUDNIK Boris
11 March 2015; 20:30	(20–25, 25–19, 25–22, 19–25, 15–17)			Podpromie Hall, Rzeszów; Attendance: 4,512; Referees: HUHTANISKA Ahti - SKUDNIK Boris

==== Final Four ====
28 March 2015; 20:00	Asseco Resovia Rzeszów (Poland)	3–0	(Poland) PGE Skra Bełchatów	Max-Schmeling-Halle, Berlin; Attendance: 9,000; Referees: DI GIACOMO Arturo - SIMONOVIC Vladimir
28 March 2015; 20:00	(25–23, 25–23, 25–22)			Max-Schmeling-Halle, Berlin; Attendance: 9,000; Referees: DI GIACOMO Arturo - SIMONOVIC Vladimir

29 March 2015; 15:45	Zenit Kazan (Russia)	3–0	(Poland) Asseco Resovia Rzeszów	Max-Schmeling-Halle, Berlin; Attendance: 9,350; Referees: MOKRY Juraj - COLLADOS Fabrice
29 March 2015; 15:45	(25–22, 25–23, 25–21)			Max-Schmeling-Halle, Berlin; Attendance: 9,350; Referees: MOKRY Juraj - COLLADOS Fabrice
