= Péter Veres =

Péter Veres may refer to:

- Péter Veres (politician) (1897–1970), Hungarian politician and writer
- Péter Veres (volleyball) (born 1979), Hungarian volleyball player
