= Aleh Akhrem =

Belarusian volleyball player

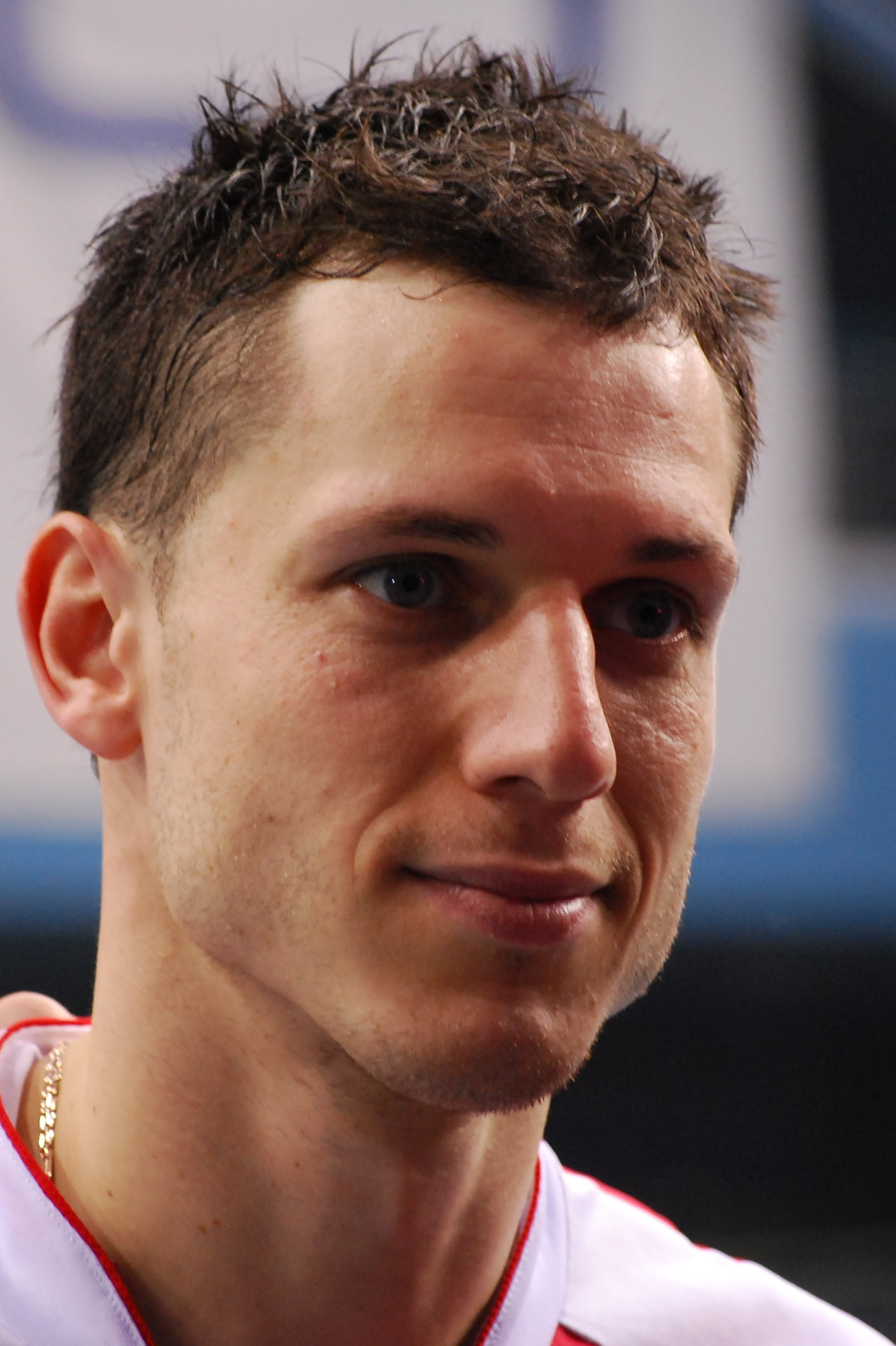

Personal information
- Nickname: Alek
- Born: 12 March 1983 (age 43); Grodno, Belarus (then part of the Soviet Union)
- Height: 1.94 m (6 ft 4 in)

Coaching information
- Current team: Asseco Resovia
Previous teams coached
Years	Teams
2020–	Asseco Resovia (AC)

Volleyball information
- Position: Outside hitter

Career
Years	Teams
2001–2005; 2005–2007; 2007–2009; 2009–2016; 2016–2017; 2017–2018; 2018–2019; 2020	Kommunalnik Grodno; Kommunalnik Mogilev; Iraklis Thessaloniki; Asseco Resovia; Halkbank Ankara; Galatasaray; Warta Zawiercie; Asseco Resovia

National team
Belarus

Aleh Akhrem or Olieg Achrem (born 12 March 1983) is a Belarusian professional volleyball coach and former volleyball player, a former member of the Belarus national team, with which he competed in the 2013 European Championship. He serves as an assistant coach for Asseco Resovia.

== Personal life ==
Aleh was born in Grodno. On 5 January 2011, he received Polish citizenship (he changed his name as a result). He is married to Natalia. They have two sons, Igor and Daniel.

== Career ==
=== Club ===
He was one of the main players and later the captain of Asseco Resovia. In 2016, Akhrem moved to Turkey where he played for Halkbank Ankara and Galatasaray. In May 2018, Akhrem came back to Poland, and signed a contract with Aluron Virtu Warta Zawiercie.

== Honours ==
=== Club ===
- CEV Champions League
  - 2008–09 – with Iraklis Thessaloniki
  - 2014–15 – with Asseco Resovia
- CEV Cup
  - 2011–12 – with Asseco Resovia
- Domestic
  - 2001–02 Belarusian Championship, with Kommunalnik Grodno
  - 2002–03 Belarusian Championship, with Kommunalnik Grodno
  - 2004–05 Belarusian Cup, with Kommunalnik Grodno
  - 2004–05 Belarusian Championship, with Kommunalnik Grodno
  - 2005–06 Belarusian Championship, with Kommunalnik Mogilev
  - 2006–07 Belarusian Championship, with Kommunalnik Mogilev
  - 2007–08 Greek SuperCup, with Iraklis Thessaloniki
  - 2007–08 Greek Championship, with Iraklis Thessaloniki
  - 2008–09 Greek SuperCup, with Iraklis Thessaloniki
  - 2011–12 Polish Championship, with Asseco Resovia
  - 2012–13 Polish Championship, with Asseco Resovia
  - 2013–14 Polish SuperCup, with Asseco Resovia
  - 2014–15 Polish Championship, with Asseco Resovia
  - 2016–17 Turkish Championship, with Halkbank Ankara
