= Marko Ivović =

Serbian volleyball player (born 1990)

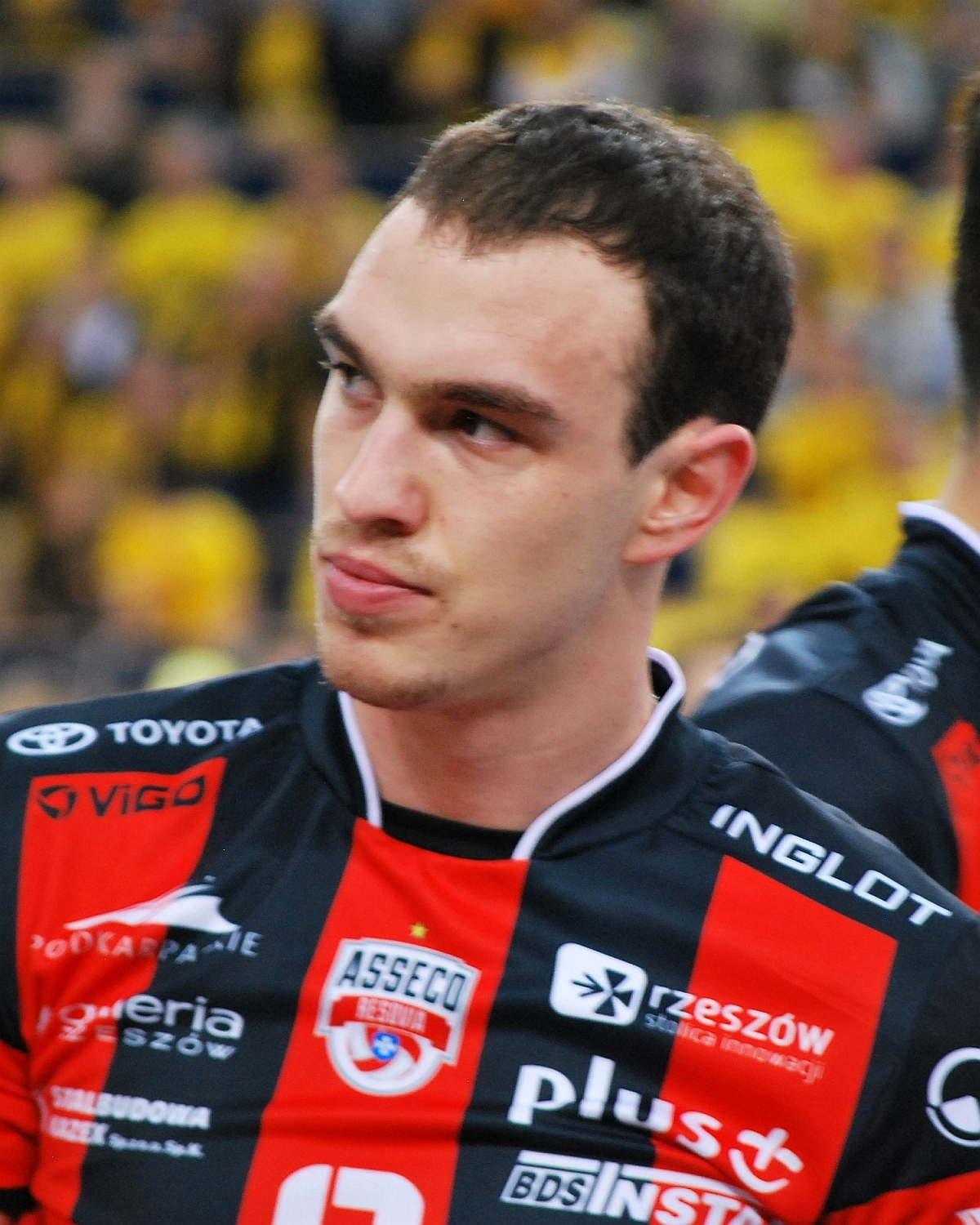
- Ivović in 2014

Personal information
- Nationality: Serbian
- Born: 22 December 1990 (age 35); Ljig, SR Serbia, SFR Yugoslavia
- Height: 1.94 m (6 ft 4 in)
- Weight: 89 kg (196 lb)
- Spike: 365 cm (144 in)
- Block: 330 cm (130 in)

Volleyball information
- Position: Outside hitter
- Current club: Lokomotiv Novosibirsk

Career
Years	Teams
2009–2012; 2012–2013; 2013–2014; 2014–2015; 2015–2016; 2016–2017; 2017–2018; 2018–2021; 2021–2024; 2024–	Vojvodina Novi Sad; Maliye Milli Piyango; Paris Volley; Asseco Resovia; Belogorie Belgorod; Asseco Resovia; Vôlei Taubaté; Lokomotiv Novosibirsk; Dynamo LO; Lokomotiv Novosibirsk

National team
2012–	Serbia
Honours
Men's volleyball
Representing Serbia
FIVB World League
Gold medal – first place	2016 Kraków
Silver medal – second place	2015 Rio de Janeiro
CEV European Championship
Gold medal – first place	2019 Belgium/France/Netherlands/Slovenia
Bronze medal – third place	2013 Denmark/Poland

Marko Ivović (Serbian Cyrillic: Марко Ивовић; born 22 December 1990) is a Serbian professional volleyball player who plays as an outside hitter for Lokomotiv Novosibirsk and the Serbia national team. He is the 2019 European Champion and the 2016 World League winner with Serbia.

== Career ==
=== Club ===
Ivović spent the 2013–14 season playing for Paris Volley. His team won the CEV Cup and he himself was named the Most valuable player of the final.

In 2014, he moved to the PlusLiga team, Asseco Resovia. He won the 2014–15 CEV Champions League silver medal, having lost to Zenit Kazan in the final, and the 2015 Polish Champion title. In May 2015, he left Resovia and signed a contract with the Russian team, Belogorie Belgorod. In April 2016, he came back to Asseco Resovia for the 2016–17 season.

In April 2018, Lokomotiv Novosibirsk, announced that they had signed Ivović for the 2018–19 season.

=== National team ===
In 2015, Serbia reached the World League final, but eventually lost to France (0–3), and obtained silver medals.

On 17 July 2016, the Serbian national volleyball team won their first ever World League title by a 3–0 win over Brazil. Marko Ivović earned the tournament's Most valuable player award.

Marko Ivović was voted the Best Volleyball Player in Serbia in 2016.

== Honours ==
=== Club ===
- CEV Champions League
  - 2014–15 – with Asseco Resovia
- CEV Cup
  - 2013–14 – with Paris Volley
- Domestic
  - 2009–10 Serbian Cup, with Vojvodina Novi Sad
  - 2011–12 Serbian Cup, with Vojvodina Novi Sad
  - 2013–14 French SuperCup, with Paris Volley
  - 2013–14 French Championship, with Paris Volley
  - 2014–15 Polish Championship, with Asseco Resovia
  - 2019–20 Russian Championship, with Lokomotiv Novosibirsk

=== Individual awards ===
- 2014: French Championship – Most valuable player
- 2014: French Championship – Best receiver
- 2014: CEV Cup – Most valuable player
- 2016: FIVB World League – Best outside spiker
- 2016: FIVB World League – Most valuable player
- 2016: Best Volleyball Player in Serbia

Awards
Preceded by (France) Earvin N'Gapeth	Most Valuable Player of FIVB World League; 2016	Succeeded by (France) Earvin N'Gapeth
Preceded by (Poland) Michał Kubiak (France) Earvin N'Gapeth	Best Outside Spiker of FIVB World League; 2016 ex aequo (France) Antonin Rouzier	Succeeded by (Brazil) Ricardo Lucarelli (France) Earvin N'Gapeth
