= Andrzej Kowal =

Polish volleyball player and coach

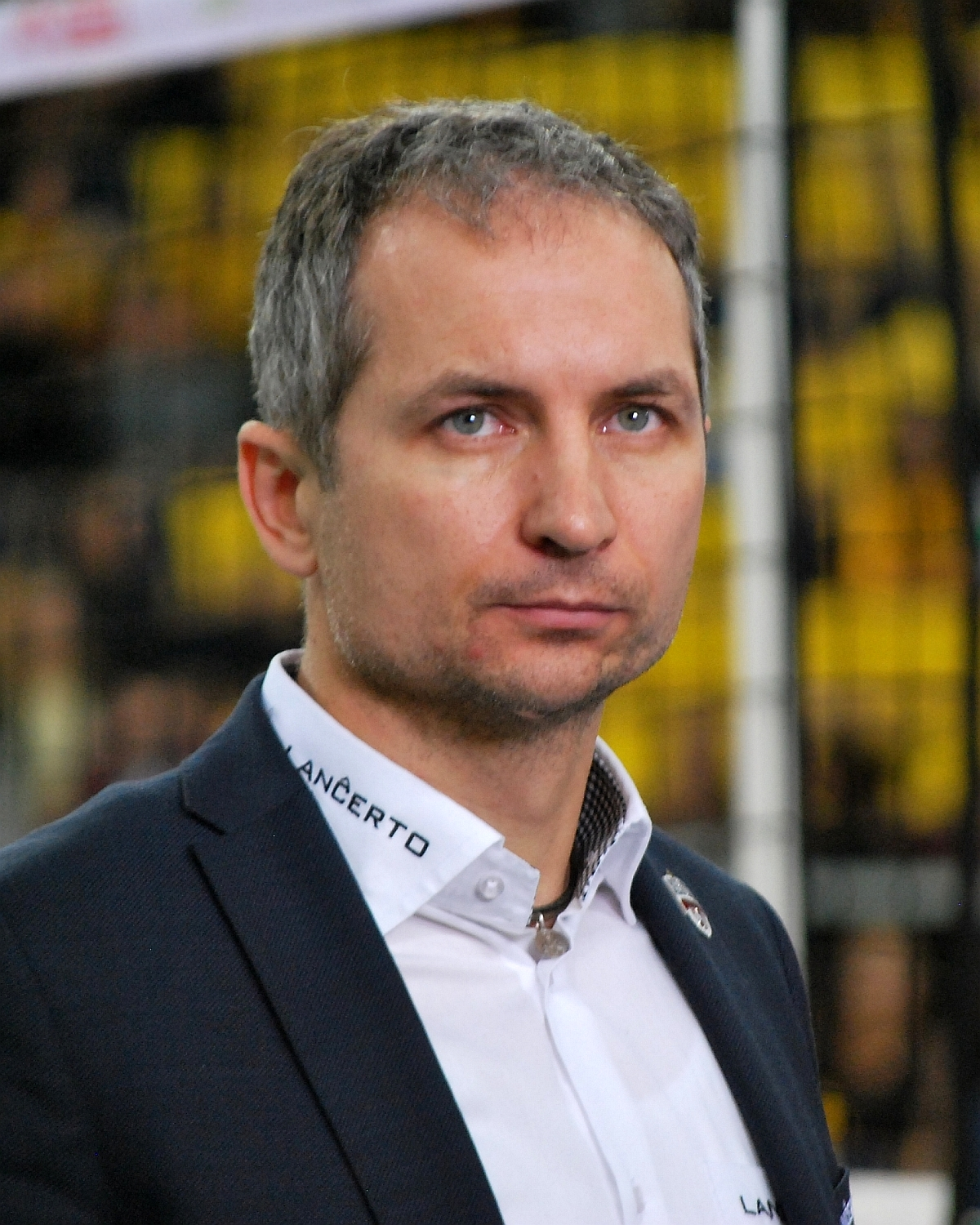

Personal information
- Born: 27 February 1971 (age 55); Nowa Sarzyna, Poland
- Hometown: Leżajsk, Poland

Coaching information
- Current team: Jastrzębie Barkom
Previous teams coached
Years	Teams
2004–2007; 2007–2008; 2008–2011; 2011–2017; 2014–2015; 2017–2018; 2019; 2019–2022; 2023–2024; 2024–2025; 2025–2026; 2026–	Asseco Resovia (AC); Asseco Resovia; Asseco Resovia (AC); Asseco Resovia; Poland B Asseco Resovia; Volei Municipal Zalău; Ślepsk Suwałki; Jihostroj České Budějovice; Stilon Gorzów; Jastrzębski Węgiel; Jastrzębie Barkom

Career
Years	Teams
1987–1990; 1990–1996; 1996–1998; 1998–2002	Avia Świdnik; Resovia; Górnik Radlin; Resovia
Honours
Men's volleyball
Head coach Poland
European League
Bronze medal – third place	2015 Poland

Andrzej Kowal (born 27 February 1971) is a Polish professional volleyball coach and former player who serves as a head coach for Jastrzębie Barkom.

== Personal life ==
Kowal was born in Nowa Sarzyna but spent his childhood in nearby Leżajsk in southeastern Poland. He is married to Magdalena and has two children – son Michał and daughter Monika.

== Career as coach ==
In 2011, Kowal was appointed new head coach of Asseco Resovia. His first big success was winning the domestic league title in 2012 and CEV Cup silver medals the same season. The following season, Resovia won the 2012–13 PlusLiga title, beating ZAKSA Kędzierzyn-Koźle in the finals. During the 2014–15 season, his team made it to the Final Four of the 2014–15 CEV Champions League, where they eventually lost to Zenit Kazan in the final. In the same season, he led Resovia to their 7th Polish Champions title. In April 2015, he extended his contract with Asseco Resovia.

In February 2014, he took over the Poland national U23 team and participated in the 2015 European Games, where the team finished in 4th place. On 14 August 2015, the same team won the European League bronze medals.

== Honours ==
=== As a coach ===
- CEV Champions League
  - 2014–15 – with Asseco Resovia
- CEV Cup
  - 2011–12 – with Asseco Resovia
- Domestic
  - 2011–12 Polish Championship, with Asseco Resovia
  - 2012–13 Polish Championship, with Asseco Resovia
  - 2013–14 Polish SuperCup, with Asseco Resovia
  - 2014–15 Polish Championship, with Asseco Resovia
  - 2023–24 Czech Championship, with Jihostroj České Budějovice
