= Roberto Serniotti =

Italian volleyball coach

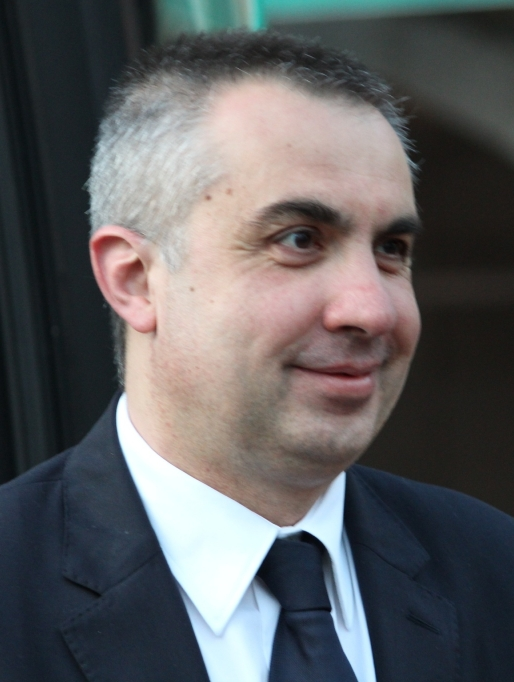
- Roberto Serniotti in 2013

Personal information
- Nickname: Sernio
- Nationality: Italian
- Born: 1 May 1962 (age 64); Turin, Italy
- Height: 1.80 m (5 ft 11 in)

Coaching information
- Current team: (Japan) JTEKT Stings
Previous teams coached
Years	Teams
1992–1999; 1999–2000; 2000–2002; 2002–2003; 2003–2004; 2004–2006; 2005–2007; 2006–2008; 2008–2009; 2009–2010; 2010; 2010–2013; 2013–2014; 2015–2017; 2017; 2018–2022; 2023-2025; 2025-	Piemonte Volley (AC); Piemonte Volley (Greece) Panathinaikos; Piemonte Volley (AC); France (AC); Tours VB; Italy (AC); M. Roma Volley (Russia) VC Yaroslavich; Prisma Volley; France; Trentino Volley (AC); Trentino Volley (Germany) Berlin Recycling Volleys (Poland) Asseco Resovia; Piemonte Volley; AS Cannes Volley-Ball (Japan) JTEKT Stings (AC)

Roberto Serniotti (born 1 May 1962) is an Italian professional volleyball coach.

A former head coach of many teams in the whole of Europe, among others, Panathīnaïkos Athlītikos Omilos, Tours Volley-Ball, Berlin Recycling Volleys, M. Roma Volley, Trentino Volley, Asseco Resovia.

He is currently the assistant coach of the JTEKT Stings

== Career ==
His career in the top series began in 1992, as 2nd coach at Piemonte Volley. In the Cuneo club, he remained uninterruptedly until 2000 (the last year as 1st coach), winning numerous national and international trophies. After two seasons in Greece at Panathīnaïkos Athlītikos Omilos, he sits again on the bench of Piemonte Volley, as first coach until the end of the Serie A1 2002-03.

In 2003 he moved to France, sitting on the bench of Tours Volley-Ball, which led to the height of his triumphs, guiding the transalpine team to the victory of the first and only Champions League (2nd Champions League won by a French team), one French SuperCup and two French Cups. From 2003 to 2004 he was also the assistant coach of France with which he won a silver medal at the 2003 European Championship and participated in the 2004 Summer Olympics. From 2005 to 2007, instead, he was assistant coach of the Italy, with which he won the 2005 European Championship, the bronze medal to the 2005 World Grand Champions Cup and the bronze medal to the 2005 Summer Universiade too.

His transalpine adventure was interrupted in 2006, when he was hired by M. Roma Volley. The newborn Roman club, even though it was his first experience, soon achieved prestigious results: in Italy the final of the Italian Cup and of the Italian Supercup where in both cases they lost 3-0 to the very strong Sisley Treviso, while in the European field he triumphed in the CEV Cup against the Belgian team Maaseik 3-0 After two seasons the club decides not to renew its membership to the top division, and Serniotti flies to Russia on the bench of VC Yaroslavich.

From December 29, 2009, until the end of the championship, he is the first coach of Prisma Volley of Taranto.

In 2010 he collaborates again with the French national team coaching Selection B.

On June 21, 2010 he was hired by Trentino Volley, looking for a second coach to join Radostin Stojčev. On the bench of the Trentino team he wins for the first time the Italian championship and the World Cup for clubs, which end up several times in his palmarès. He also triumphed in the Italian Cup, the Italian Supercup and the Champions League.

In the summer of 2013 the club encountered financial difficulties, which forced it to sell many of its strongest players, including Osmany Juantorena, Matej Kazijski, Jan Štokr; among the departures was also the coach Radostin Stojčev, who had reached the end of his contract. Serniotti is promoted to 1st coach of the team, signing a contract renewal of one season, and as his 2nd coach he calls Simone Roscini. The adventure at the helm of the Trentino bench lasts only one season, in which he wins the Italian Supercup and the bronze medal at the World Club Championship. In the Italian Cup he was eliminated in the semifinals by Piacenza, while he placed 4th at the end of the regular season and was then eliminated in the playoff quarter-finals by Modena. In the Champions League it took first place in the group and went all the way to the six-man playoffs, where it was defeated in both the first leg and the return leg by the Russians Belgorod 3-0, thus losing access to the Final Four in Ankara.

In the 2015-16 season is called to the guide of Berlin Recycling Volleys, in the 1. German Bundesliga He calls as his second the Japanese coach Koichiro Shimbo with whom he obtained excellent results both on the national and European field. This was the year of the "triple": he won the CEV Cup(the first European trophy in the club's history), the German championship and the German Cup (a trophy that had been missing in Berlin for 15 years). The following year, he reconfirmed himself as German champion in addition to leading the German team to the Final Four of the Champions League. At the beginning of the season, they failed to win the German Supercup, which was won by the Friedrichshafen team, which also snatched the German cup won by the Berlin team the previous year.

In the 2017-18 championship he became coach of Asseco Resovia in Polska Liga Siatkówki, but in December 2017 he terminated his contract with the Polish team.

In February 2018 he is called to lead Piemonte Volley in Serie B, thus returning to the city that launched him as a coach; despite not being reconfirmed for the following season, in December of the same year he returns to sit on the Cuneo bench, this time in Serie A2, to replace Mauro Barisciani.

In the 2020-21 season he finished third in the league and was eliminated in the playoff semifinal by Prisma Taranto of Taranto while in the Italian Cup A2/A3 he reached the semifinal losing to Olimpia Bergamo, the team ultimately winning the tournament.

In the 2021-22 championship he reached the final of the Italian Cup A2/A3 thus bringing back, 11 years later, a Cup final at Piemonte Volley against Conad Reggio Emilia, a team that wins at the Cuneo home for 3 to 1, winning the 25th edition. Furthermore, at the end of the regular season he comes third again, thus reconfirming the position of the previous year and this time reaching the final of the playoffs where he always meets the Reggio team that imposes itself for 3 to 1 in the Best of Five and gets the move to the SuperLega. With his contract expiring at the end of the season, the club and the coach parted ways.

In the summer of 2024, he was signed by AS Cannes Volley-Ball, a team in the French Ligue B, which had been relegated the year before after winning the French championship, and which had stopped in the play-off semifinals against Lozere. In their first season on the Côte d'Azur, they managed to finish the regular season in first place and win the championship by beating Ajaccio in the final, thus bringing the team back into Ligue A.

The following year, he finished the regular season in eighth place, qualifying for the playoffs where he met Montpellier Volley in the Best of Five that ended 3-1 in favour of the regular season winner, while in the French Cup he reached the round of 16 where he was eliminated by Montpellier Volley. With his contract expiring, the club announced the end of his working relationship before the playoffs began.

In July 2025, he was announced as a member of the coaching staff at JTEKT Stings Aichi, a Japanese team competing in the SV League. He joined the team led by Koichiro Schimbo, an old acquaintance with whom he had previously worked in reversed roles at various clubs across Europe. In his first year in Japan, the team finished third at the end of the regular season and were knocked out in the semi-finals, losing 2–0 to Osaka Bluteon in a best-of-three series, whilst in the Emperor’s Cup they reached the semi-finals, where they were defeated 3–0 by Wolfdogs Nagoya, the eventual tournament winners. Having failed to reach the league final, the team competed in the Asian Champions League in Indonesia, where they finished third and were awarded the bronze medal.

== Honours ==
=== National team ===
- Men's European Volleyball Championship
  - 2005 – with Italy
  - 2003 – with France
- FIVB Volleyball Men's World Grand Champions Cup
  - 2005 – with Italy
- Volleyball at the 2005 Summer Universiade
  - 2005 – with Italy

=== Clubs ===
- FIVB Volleyball Men's Club World Championship
  - 2010/2011 – with Trentino Volley
  - 2011/2012 – with Trentino Volley
  - 2012/2013 – with Trentino Volley
  - 2013/2014 – with Trentino Volley
- CEV Champions League
  - 2004/2005 – with Tours VB
  - 2010/2011 – with Trentino Volley
- CEV Cup
  - 1995/1996 – with TNT Alpitour Cuneo
  - 2007/2008 – with M. Roma Volley
  - 2015/2016 – with Berlin Recycling Volleys
- CEV Cup Winners' Cup
  - 1996/1997 – with TNT Alpitour Cuneo
  - 1997/1998 – with TNT Alpitour Cuneo
- European SuperCup
  - 1996/1997 – with TNT Alpitour Cuneo
  - 1997/1998 – with TNT Alpitour Cuneo
- National championships
  - 1995/1996 Italian SuperCup, with TNT Alpitour Cuneo
  - 1999/2000 Italian SuperCup, with TNT Alpitour Cuneo
  - 2000/2001 Italian SuperCup, with TNT Alpitour Cuneo
  - 2010/2011 Italian SuperCup, with Trentino Volley
  - 2012/2013 Italian SuperCup, with Trentino Volley
  - 2005/2006 French SuperCup, with Tours VB
  - 1995/1996 Italian Cup, with TNT Alpitour Cuneo
  - 1998/1999 Italian Cup, with TNT Alpitour Cuneo
  - 2011/2012 Italian Cup, with TNT Alpitour Cuneo
  - 2012/2013 Italian Cup, with TNT Alpitour Cuneo
  - 2004/2005 French Cup, with Tours VB
  - 2005/2006 French Cup, with Tours VB
  - 2015/2016 German Cup, with Berlin Recycling Volleys
  - 2010/2011 Italian Championship, with Trentino Volley
  - 2012/2013 Italian Championship, with Trentino Volley
  - 2015/2016 German Championship, with Berlin Recycling Volleys
  - 2016/2017 German Championship, with Berlin Recycling Volleys
  - 2023/2024 French Championship, with AS Cannes Volley-Ball
