= Jochen Schöps =

German volleyball player (born 1983)

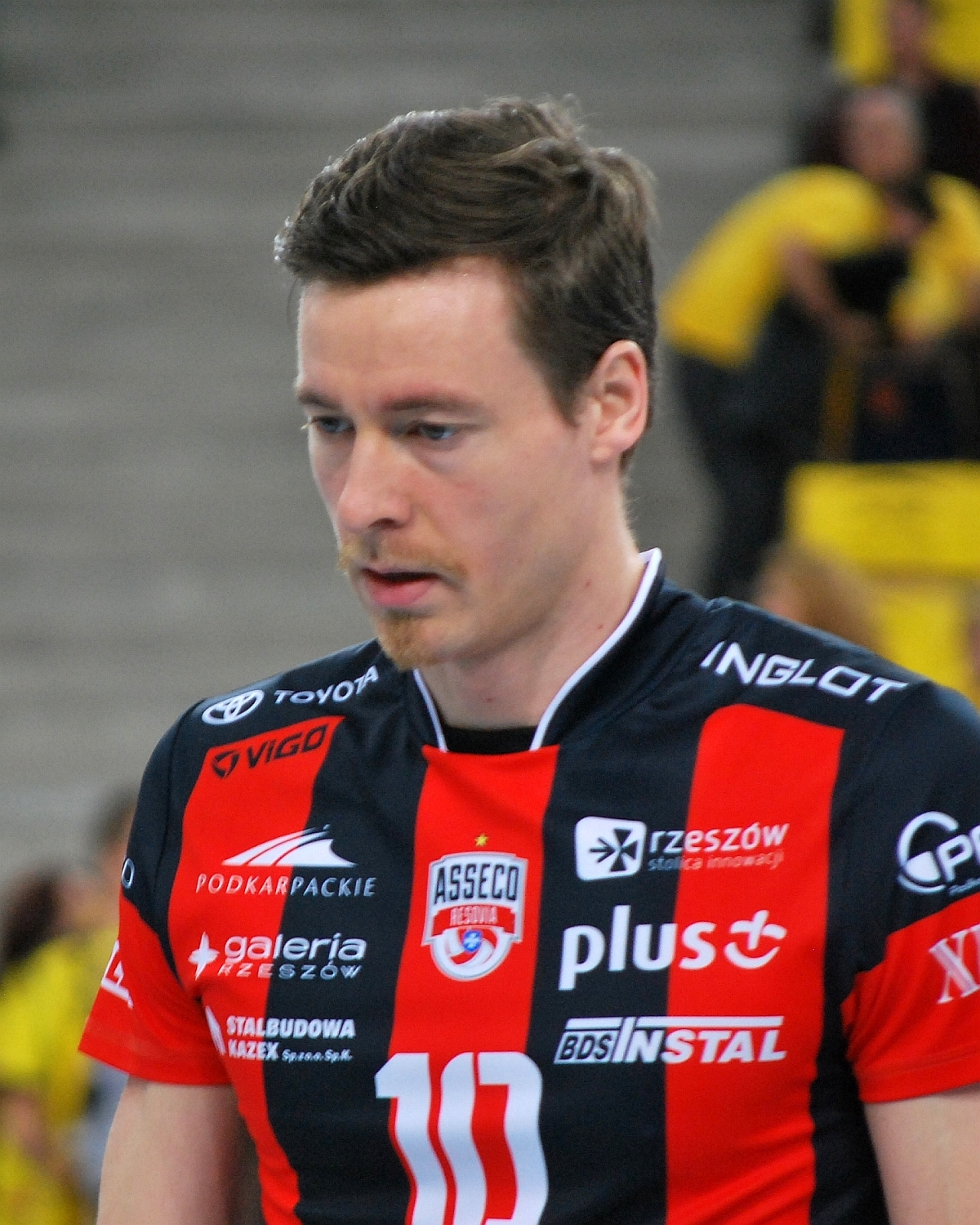

Personal information
- Nationality: German
- Born: 8 October 1983 (age 43); Villingen-Schwenningen, West Germany
- Height: 2.00 m (6 ft 7 in)

Volleyball information
- Position: Opposite
- Number: 10

Career
Years	Teams
2002–2003; 2003–2007; 2007–2012; 2012–2018; 2018–2019; 2019–2020; 2020–2022	Olympia Berlin; VfB Friedrichshafen; Iskra Odintsovo; Asseco Resovia; Stade Poitevin Poitiers; Police SC; United Volleys Frankfurt

National team
2002–2018	Germany
Honours
Men's volleyball
Representing Germany
FIVB World Championship
Bronze medal – third place	2014 Poland
European League
Gold medal – first place	2009 Portugal
European Games
Gold medal – first place	2015 Baku

Jochen Schöps (born 8 October 1983) is a German professional volleyball player, a former member of the Germany national team, a participant at the Olympic Games (Beijing 2008, London 2012), bronze medallist at the 2014 World Championship, and the 2006–07 CEV Champions League winner.

== Personal life ==
In March 2016, Schöps became a father to twins, daughter Lotte and son Theo.

== Career ==
=== Clubs ===
He won the 2006–07 CEV Champions League with VfB Friedrichshafen, and was named the Most Valuable Player. With the Russian team of Iskra Odintsovo he reached the 2008–09 CEV Champions League semifinals and was named the Best Scorer of the tournament. In the 2013–14 PlusLiga season, he won the Polish Championship silver medal after losing the final games to PGE Skra Bełchatów. On 29 March 2015, Asseco Resovia, including Schöps, won the 2014–15 CEV Champions League silver medal. In April 2016, he signed a new two–year contract until 2017.

== Honours ==
=== Clubs ===
- CEV Champions League
  - 2006/2007 – with VfB Friedrichshafen
  - 2014/2015 – with Asseco Resovia
- CEV Cup
  - 2009/2010 – with Iskra Odintsovo
- National championships
  - 2004/2005 German Cup, with VfB Friedrichshafen
  - 2004/2005 German Championship, with VfB Friedrichshafen
  - 2005/2006 German Cup, with VfB Friedrichshafen
  - 2005/2006 German Championship, with VfB Friedrichshafen
  - 2006/2007 German Cup, with VfB Friedrichshafen
  - 2006/2007 German Championship, with VfB Friedrichshafen
  - 2012/2013 Polish Championship, with Asseco Resovia
  - 2013/2014 Polish SuperCup, with Asseco Resovia
  - 2014/2015 Polish Championship, with Asseco Resovia

=== Individual awards ===
- 2002: CEV U20 European Championship – Best Spiker
- 2007: CEV Champions League – Most Valuable Player
- 2009: CEV Champions League – Best Scorer
- 2009: European League – Best Spiker
- 2009: European League – Most Valuable Player
- 2010: CEV Cup – Best Spiker
- 2010: CEV Cup – Best Scorer
- 2015: Polish Cup – Best Opposite

Awards
Preceded by (Italy) Alessandro Fei	Most Valuable Player of CEV Champions League; 2006/2007	Succeeded by (United States) Clayton Stanley
Preceded by (Bulgaria) Hristo Zlatanov	Best Scorer of CEV Champions League; 2008/2009	Succeeded by (Poland) Mariusz Wlazły
