= Topvolley Antwerpen =

Belgian volleyball club

- Ground: Fort 8 Hoboken; Belgium
- Chairman: (Belgium) Jean Marie Vankerkhove
- League: Liga Heren
- Website: Club home page

Uniforms
Home	Away

Topvolley Precura Schelde-Natie Antwerpen is a volleyball club from Antwerp, Belgium.

Antwerpen plays in the Liga, the highest level of Belgian men's volleyball. The club has been present at this level since 2008. They ended 5th after the regular competition of the 2008-09 season, but still had to participate in the playdowns after they lost a double confrontation against 8th placed PNV Waasland.

The club came into existence in 1995, after a merger between VC Zorgvliet Hoboken and First Antwerp Volley Team. Two years later, VC Zorgvliet Antwerpen promoted for the first time to the Liga. After some quite successful seasons and a participation in the 1998 CEV Cup, the club relegated in 2003. After five seasons at the second level, Antwerpen returned to the highest division.

The team merged with VBC Scheld-Natie Kapellen after the 2010-11 season. Kapellen were also playing in the Liga at that moment.

In 2014, the club secured the victory in the Belgian cup.

== Squad ==
Coach: (Belgium) Kris Tanghe

#	Nat.	Name	Position	Birthday	Height
1	(Belgium)	Dennis Deroey	Libero	14/08/87	191
2	(Belgium)	Niels Huysegoms	Middleblocker	11/04/93	201
4	(Netherlands)	Jente de Vries	Opposite	04/07/94	200
6	(Sweden)	Jens Ahremark	Middleblocker	22/04/94	197
8	(Finland)	Elviss Krastins	Outside hitter	15/09/94	192
10	(Belgium)	Jolan Cox	Opposite	12/07/91	194
11	(Belgium)	Simon Peeters	Outside hitter	28/04/97	192
12	(Belgium)	Stef van Heyste	Setter	04/03/96	191
14	(Finland)	Sauli Sinkkonen	Middleblocker	14/09/89	201
16	AUS	Thomas Powell	Outside hitter	16/09/92	194
