= Łukasz Perłowski =

Polish volleyball player (born 1984)

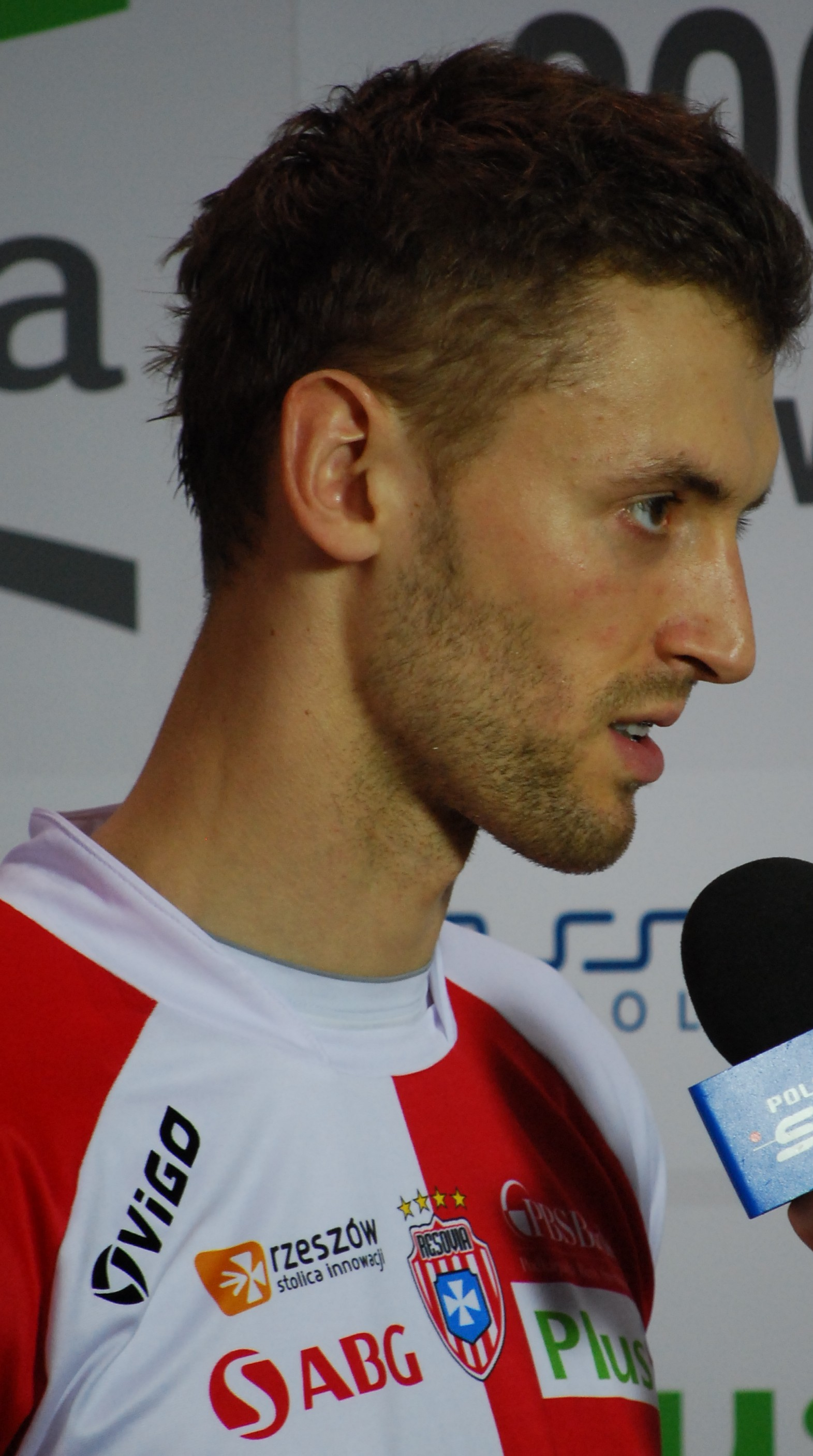

Personal information
- Full name: Łukasz Perłowski
- Nationality: (Poland) Polish
- Born: 3 April 1984 (age 42) Strzyżów, Poland
- Height: 2.04 m (6 ft 8 in)

Volleyball information
- Position: Middle blocker

Career
- Years: Team
- 2004–2016 2016–2017 2017–2019 2019–: (Poland) MKS Wisłok Strzyżów (Poland) Asseco Resovia Rzeszów (Poland) Espadon Szczecin (Poland) Asseco Resovia Rzeszów (Poland) PZL Sędziszów Małopolski

National team
- Years: Team
- 2007–2014: Poland (4)

Łukasz Perłowski (born 3 April 1984) is a Polish volleyball player, a member of Poland men's national volleyball team and Polish club PZL Sędziszów Małopolski, three–time Polish Champion (2012, 2013, 2015).

== Personal life ==
He is married and has a daughter named Julia.

== Career ==
In 2004 he joined Asseco Resovia Rzeszów. He has been playing for the club from Rzeszów for over 10 years. In his first seven years there, he won silver (2009) and two bronze medals of Polish Championship (2010, 2011). In the season 2013/2014 he won Polish SuperCup and silver medal of Polish Championship after losing matches with PGE Skra Bełchatów. In April 2015 he achieved title of Polish Champion. In 2016 he left the club from Rzeszów and moved to 1st Polish league club Espadon Szczecin.

== Sporting achievements ==
- CEV Champions League
  - 2014/2015 – with Asseco Resovia Rzeszów
- CEV Cup
  - 2011/2012 – with Asseco Resovia Rzeszów
- National championships
  - 2008/2009 Polish Championship, with Asseco Resovia Rzeszów
  - 2011/2012 Polish Championship, with Asseco Resovia Rzeszów
  - 2012/2013 Polish Championship, with Asseco Resovia Rzeszów
  - 2013/2014 Polish SuperCup, with Asseco Resovia Rzeszów
  - 2013/2014 Polish Championship, with Asseco Resovia Rzeszów
  - 2014/2015 Polish Championship, with Asseco Resovia Rzeszów
  - 2015/2016 Polish Championship, with Asseco Resovia Rzeszów
