= Lukáš Ticháček =

Czech volleyball player

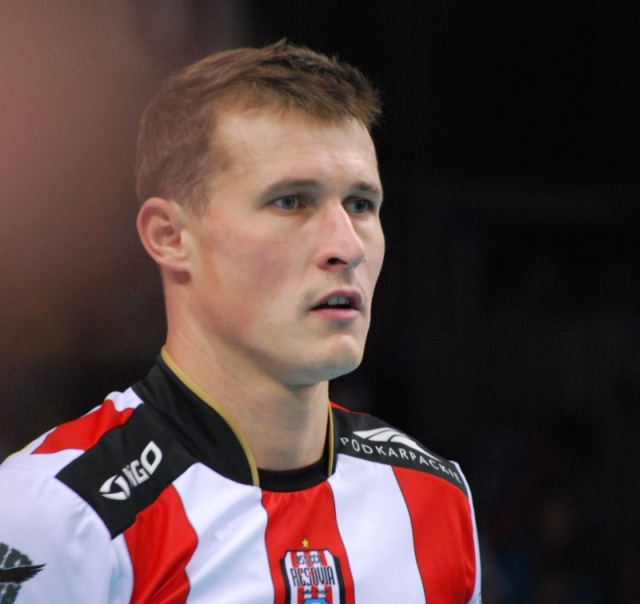
- Lukáš Ticháček as Resovia player

Personal information
- Nationality: Czech; Polish
- Born: 12 January 1982 (age 44); Přerov, Czech Republic
- Height: 1.93 m (6 ft 4 in)

Volleyball information
- Position: Setter
- Current club: Dukla Liberec
- Number: 5

Career
Years	Teams
2001–2006; 2006–2011; 2011–2018; 2018; 2018–2019; 2019–2021; 2021–2022; 2022–	Dukla Liberec; VfB Friedrichshafen; Asseco Resovia; Stocznia Szczecin; MKS Będzin; VK Karlovarsko; Gwardia Wrocław; Dukla Liberec

National team
2003–	Czech Republic
Honours
Men's volleyball
Representing Czech Republic
European League
Bronze medal – third place	2013 Turkey

Lukáš Ticháček (born 12 January 1982) is a Czech professional volleyball player with Polish citizenship, a former member of the Czech Republic national team. A bronze medalist at the 2013 European League, and the 2006–07 CEV Champions League winner.

== Personal life ==
In 2014, he married Paulina. On 24 July 2015, his wife gave birth to their first child, a daughter named Mia.

== Career ==
=== Clubs ===
On 11 May 2011, he signed a two–year contract with Asseco Resovia. During these two years, he won two Polish Champion titles (2012, 2013). In 2013, his contract was extended for the next two years. On 29 March 2015, Resovia, including Ticháček, won the 2014–15 CEV Champions League silver medal, losing in the final to Zenit Kazan. In April 2015, he signed a next two–year contract until 2017.

== Honours ==
- CEV Champions League
  - 2006/2007 – with VfB Friedrichshafen
  - 2014/2015 – with Asseco Resovia
- CEV Cup
  - 2011/2012 – with Asseco Resovia
- National championships
  - 2002/2003 Czech Championship, with Dukla Liberec
  - 2006/2007 German Cup, with VfB Friedrichshafen
  - 2006/2007 German Championship, with VfB Friedrichshafen
  - 2007/2008 German Cup, with VfB Friedrichshafen
  - 2007/2008 German Championship, with VfB Friedrichshafen
  - 2008/2009 German Championship, with VfB Friedrichshafen
  - 2009/2010 German Championship, with VfB Friedrichshafen
  - 2010/2011 German Championship, with VfB Friedrichshafen
  - 2011/2012 Polish Championship, with Asseco Resovia
  - 2012/2013 Polish Championship, with Asseco Resovia
  - 2013/2014 Polish SuperCup, with Asseco Resovia
  - 2014/2015 Polish Championship, with Asseco Resovia
  - 2020/2021 Czech Championship, with ČEZ Karlovarsko
