= Thibault Rossard =

French volleyball player (born 1993)

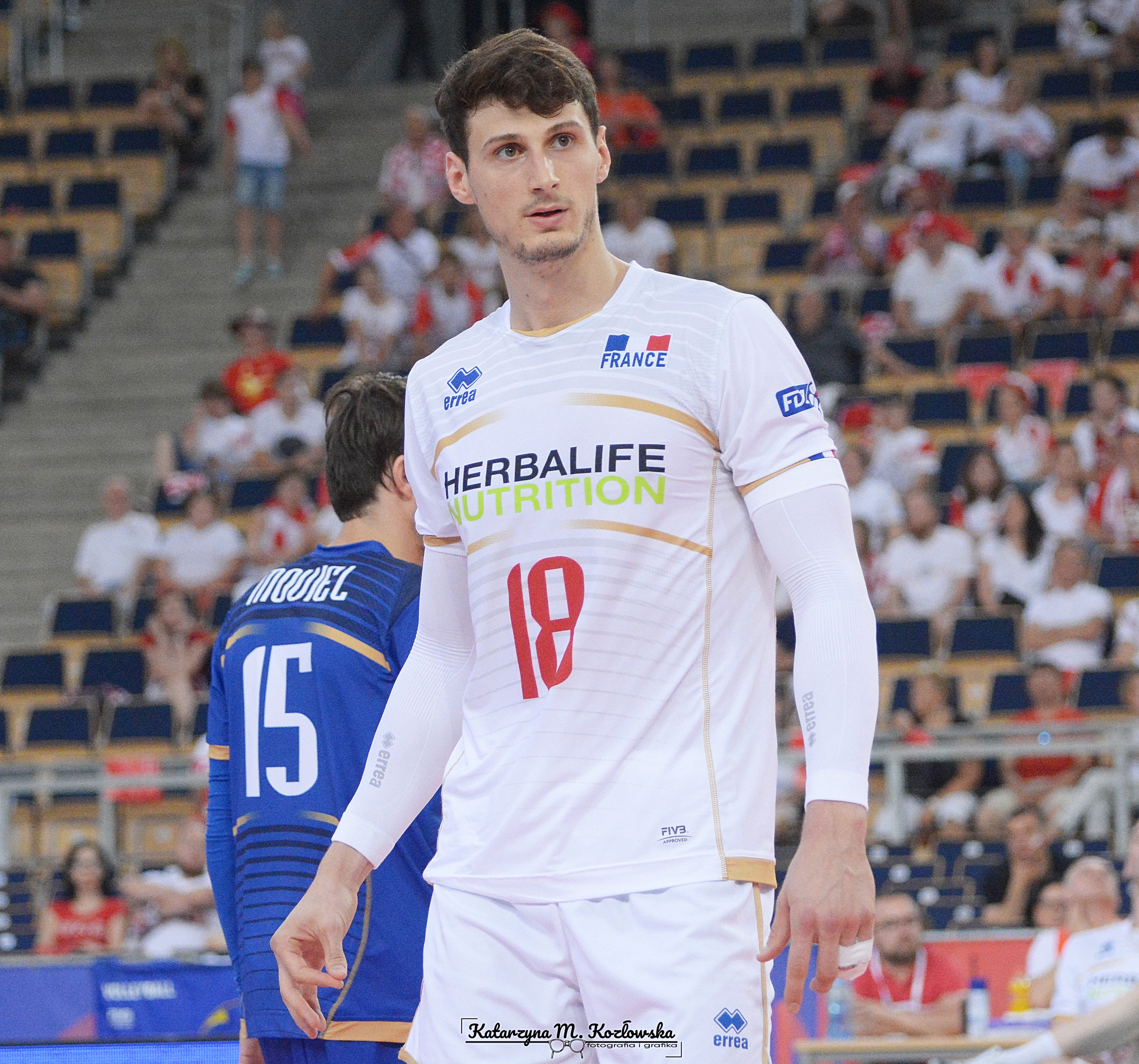

Personal information
- Nationality: French
- Born: 28 August 1993 (age 33) Soisy-sous-Montmorency, France
- Height: 1.94 m (6 ft 4 in)
- Weight: 85 kg (187 lb)
- Spike: 350 cm (138 in)
- Block: 320 cm (126 in)

Volleyball information
- Position: Outside hitter / Opposite

Career
- Years: Team
- 2011–2015 2015–2016 2016–2019 2019–2020 2020–2021 2021–2022 2022–2023 2024: Spacer's de Toulouse; Arago de Sète; Asseco Resovia; Fenerbahçe; Volley Callipo; Gas Sales Piacenza; Asseco Resovia; Warta Zawiercie

National team
- Years: Team
- 2015–: France
Honours
Men's volleyball
Representing France
FIVB World League
Gold medal – first place	2017 Curitiba
Bronze medal – third place	2016 Kraków
FIVB Nations League
Silver medal – second place	2018 Lille
Bronze medal – third place	2021 Rimini

Thibault Rossard (born 28 August 1993) is a French professional volleyball player.

== Personal life ==
His brother, Quentin is a volleyball player, as was his grandfather Jacques. His cousin, Nicolas Rossard was also a volleyball player.

== Honours ==
=== Club ===
- Domestic
  - 2015–16 French Championship, with Arago de Sète
  - 2023–24 Polish Cup, with Aluron CMC Warta Zawiercie

=== Youth national team ===
- 2011 CEV U19 European Championship

=== Individual awards ===
- 2011: CEV U19 European Championship – Best outside spiker
- 2013: FIVB U21 World Championship – Best outside spiker
- 2016: French Championship – Most valuable player
- 2016: French Championship – Best receiver
