= Dawid Dryja =

Polish volleyball player (born 1992)

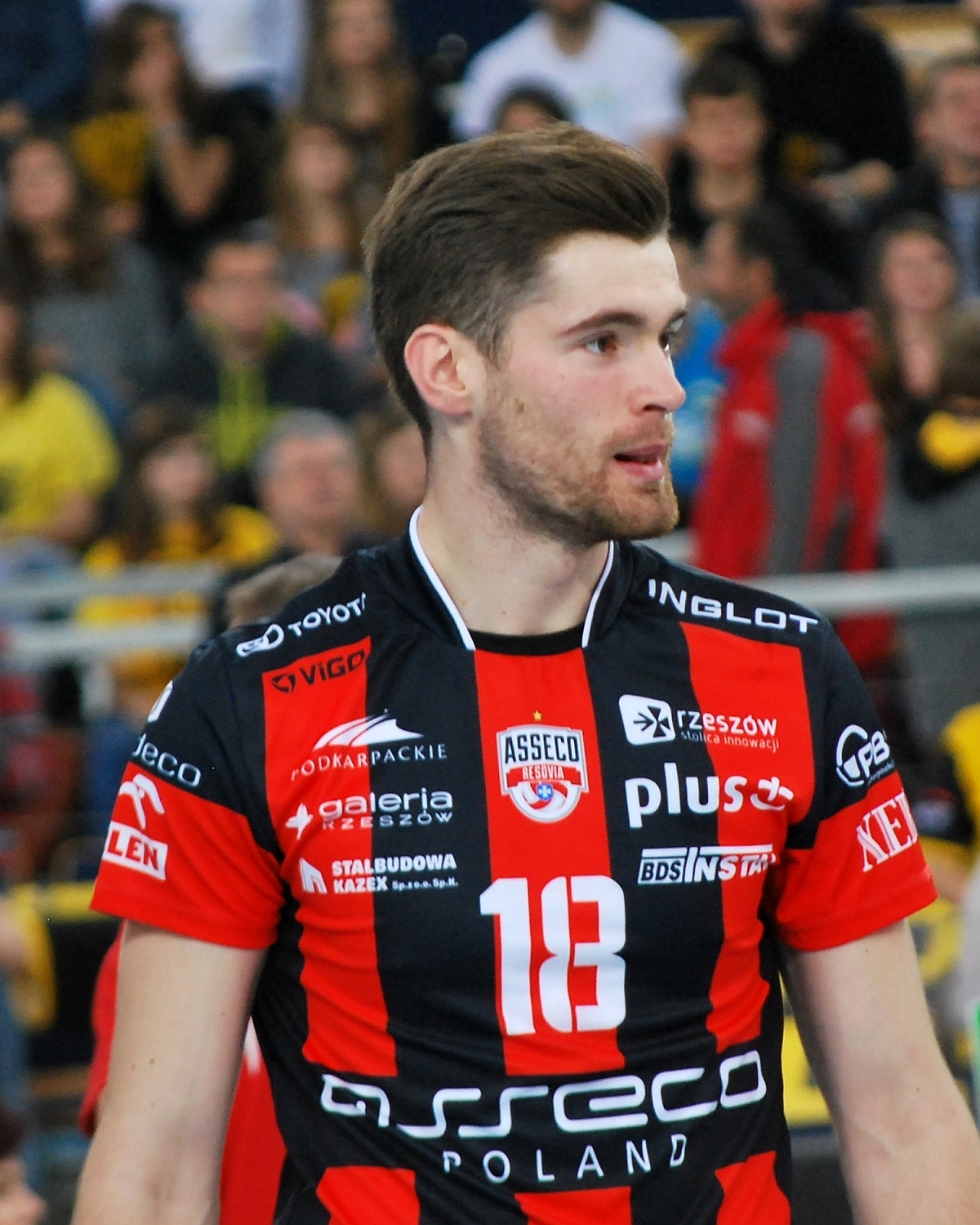

Personal information
- Nationality: Polish
- Born: 21 July 1992 (age 34); Jasło, Poland
- Height: 2.01 m (6 ft 7 in)
- Weight: 96 kg (212 lb)
- Spike: 355 cm (140 in)

Volleyball information
- Position: Middle blocker
- Current club: Jastrzębski Węgiel
- Number: 1

Career
Years	Teams
2011–2012; 2012–2013; 2013–2014; 2014–2019; 2019–2020; 2020–2021; 2021–	Asseco Resovia; AZS Politechnika Warszawska; Effector Kielce; Asseco Resovia; MKS Będzin; Czarni Radom; Jastrzębski Węgiel
Honours
Men's volleyball
Representing Poland
European League
Bronze medal – third place	2015 Poland

Dawid Dryja (born 21 July 1992) is a Polish professional volleyball player, a bronze medallist at the 2015 European League and named the Best Middle Blocker of the tournament. At the professional club level, he plays for Jastrzębski Węgiel.

== Career ==
=== Club ===
In 2011, he signed a contract with Asseco Resovia. He spent the 2012–13 season on a one–year loan in AZS Politechnika Warszawska. In the next season, he was sent on loan to Effector Kielce. In 2014, he came back to Asseco Resovia.

== Honours ==
=== Club ===
- CEV Champions League
  - 2014–15 – with Asseco Resovia
  - 2022–23 – with Jastrzębski Węgiel
- National championships
  - 2014–15 Polish Championship, with Asseco Resovia
  - 2021–22 Polish SuperCup, with Jastrzębski Węgiel
  - 2022–23 Polish SuperCup, with Jastrzębski Węgiel
  - 2022–23 Polish Championship, with Jastrzębski Węgiel

=== Youth national team ===
- 2009 European Youth Olympic Festival
