= Elviss Krastiņš =

Finnish volleyball player (born 1994)

Personal information
- Nationality: Finnish
- Born: 15 September 1994 (age 32); Sigulda, Latvia
- Height: 1.92 m (6 ft 4 in)
- Weight: 84 kg (185 lb)
- Spike: 345 cm (136 in)
- Block: 325 cm (128 in)

Volleyball information
- Position: Outside hitter
- Current team: Asseco Resovia Rzeszów
- Number: 8

Career
| Years | Teams |
|---|---|
| 2010–2016; 2016–2017; 2017– | Vammalan Lentopallo; Topvolley Antwerpen; Asseco Resovia Rzeszów |

National team
| 2013– | Finland |
- Last updated: 29 December 2017

Elviss Krastiņš (born 15 September 1994) is a Latvian-born Finnish male volleyball player. He is part of the Finland men's national volleyball team. On club level he plays for Topvolley Antwerpen.
