= Péter Veres (volleyball) =

Hungarian volleyball player (born 1979)

- Veres in 2014

Personal information
- Full name: Péter Veres
- Nationality: Hungary
- Born: February 22, 1979 (age 47); Budapest, Hungary
- Height: 2.00 m (6 ft 7 in)
- Weight: 83 kg (183 lb)
- Spike: 350 cm (140 in)
- Block: 335 cm (132 in)

Volleyball information
- Position: Outside hitter
- Current club: LPR Piacenza

National team
2001–2008, 2014–2015	Hungary
- Last updated: 2 May 2025

Péter Veres (born 22 February 1979) is a Hungarian former professional volleyball player who played as an outside hitter. He was a member of the Hungary men's national volleyball team from 2001 to 2008 and returned in 2014. Veres had an extensive international club career, earning national titles and continental medals. From 2019 to 2021, he managed the women's volleyball team at Fatum Nyíregyháza.

== Career ==
=== Club career ===
Veres began his professional career with Nyíregyháza, winning the Hungarian Championship in the 1997–98 season. He later played for clubs in Italy, Spain, Qatar, Russia, and Poland. He spent three seasons with VC Dynamo Moscow, where he won two Russian Championships and finished third in the 2010–11 CEV Champions League, earning the Best Receiver award.

In 2013, Veres joined Polish powerhouse Asseco Resovia Rzeszów, helping them win the Polish SuperCup and finish second in the 2013–14 PlusLiga season.

=== National Team Career ===
Veres represented the Hungary men's national volleyball team from 2001 to 2008 and made a return in 2014. His return brought valuable experience to a young national squad competing in the European Championship qualifiers.

=== Coaching career ===
After retiring from professional play, Veres became head coach of the women's team at Fatum Nyíregyháza from 2019 to 2021.

== Sporting Achievements ==
=== Clubs ===
- Hungarian Championship
  - 1997–98 – Gold, with Nyíregyháza
- Spanish Championship
  - 2003–04 – Gold, with Unicaja Almería
  - 2004–05 – Gold, with Unicaja Almería
- Russian Championship
  - 2010–11 – Gold, with VC Dynamo Moscow
  - 2011–12 – Gold, with VC Dynamo Moscow
- Polish SuperCup
  - 2013 – Gold, with Asseco Resovia Rzeszów
- Polish Championship
  - 2013–14 – Silver, with Asseco Resovia Rzeszów
- CEV Champions League
  - 2010–11 – Bronze, with VC Dynamo Moscow
- CEV Cup
  - 2011–12 – Gold, with VC Dynamo Moscow

=== Individual Awards ===
- 2011 – Best Receiver of the CEV Champions League Final Four
