= 2014–15 CEV Champions League =

- League: CEV Champions League
- Sport: Volleyball
- Duration: 4 November 2014 – 29 March 2015
- Teams: 28

Finals
- Venue: (Germany) Berlin
- Champions: (Russia) Zenit Kazan
- Finals MVP: (Cuba) Wilfredo León

CEV Champions League seasons
- ← 2013–14 2015–16 →

The 2014–15 CEV Champions League was the 56th edition of the highest level European volleyball club competition organised by the European Volleyball Confederation.

== Participating teams ==
Rank	Country	Number of teams	Teams
1	Italy	3	Cucine Lube Treia; Sir Safety Perugia; Copra Volley Piacenza
2	Poland	3	PGE Skra Bełchatów; Asseco Resovia; Jastrzębski Węgiel
3	Russia	3	Zenit Kazan; Lokomotiv Novosibirsk; Belogorie Belgorod
4	Turkey	2	Halkbank Ankara; Fenerbahçe SK Istanbul
5	Belgium	3	Knack Roeselare; Precura Antwerpen; Noliko Maaseik
6	Germany	2	Berlin Recycling Volleys; VfB Friedrichshafen
7	France	2	Tours VB; Paris Volley
8	Greece	1	Olympiacos Piraeus
9	Austria	2	Hypo Tirol Innsbruck; Posojilnica Aich/Dob
10	Romania	1	Tomis Constanța
12	Slovenia	1	ACH Volley Ljubljana
13	Spain	1	CAI Teruel
14	Bulgaria	1	Marek Union-Ivkoni Dupnitsa
15	Czech Republic	1	Jihostroj České Budějovice
16	Montenegro	1	Budvanska Rivijera Budva
17	Switzerland	1	#Dragons Lugano

== League round ==
Location of teams of the 2014–15 CEV Champions League league round.
Brown: Group A; Red: Group B; Orange: Group C; Yellow: Group D; Green: Group E; Blue: Group F; Purple: Group G.

28 teams have been drawn to 7 pools of 4 teams each.

In each pool, the competition is organised on the basis of a double round-robin system. Each team will thus play 6 matches: twice against each opponent.

In the League Round, the placing of the teams is determined by the number of matches won.

In case of a tie in the number of matches won by two or more teams, they will be ranked on the basis of the following criteria:

- match points;
- set quotient (the number of total sets won divided by the number of total sets lost);
- points quotient (the number of total points scored divided by the number of total points lost);
- results of head-to-head matches between the teams in question.

Match points are awarded as follows:

- 3 points for a 3:0 or 3:1 victory;
- 2 points for a 3:2 victory;
- 1 point for a 2:3 defeat;
- 0 points for a 1:3 or 0:3 defeat.

12 teams will qualify for the Playoff 12:

- the winner of each pool, and
- 5 second-ranked teams with the best score.

After the end of the League Round, the organizer of the Final Four will be determined. That team will qualify directly for the Final Four. It will be replaced in Playoff 12 by the next best second-ranked team.

The remaining second-ranked team as well 3 third-ranked teams with the best score will move to the Challenge Round of the CEV Cup.

The remaining third-ranked and all fourth-ranked teams will be eliminated.

- All times are local.

=== Pool A ===
Pos	Team	Pld	W	L	Pts	SW	SL	SR	SPW	SPL	SPR	Qualification
1	(Romania) Tomis Constanța	6	5	1	14	17	9	1.889	583	549	1.062	Playoffs
2	(Italy) Copra Volley Piacenza	6	4	2	12	16	12	1.333	643	600	1.072	Playoffs
3	(Belgium) Knack Roeselare	6	3	3	9	13	13	1.000	564	571	0.988	2014–15 CEV Cup
4	(Switzerland) #Dragons Lugano	6	0	6	1	6	18	0.333	498	568	0.877	

Date	Time		Score		Set 1	Set 2	Set 3	Set 4	Set 5	Total	Report
5 Nov	18:00	#Dragons Lugano (Switzerland)	1–3	(Belgium) Knack Roeselare	25–22	17–25	22–25	22–25		86–97	Report
5 Nov	20:30	Copra Volley Piacenza (Italy)	2–3	(Romania) Tomis Constanța	25–16	22–25	25–27	25–22	12–15	109–105	Report
18 Nov	20:30	Knack Roeselare (Belgium)	3–2	(Italy) Copra Volley Piacenza	25–22	22–25	23–25	26–24	15–12	111–108	Report
20 Nov	18:00	Tomis Constanța (Romania)	3–0	(Switzerland) #Dragons Lugano	25–19	25–22	25–18			75–59	Report
4 Dec	18:00	Tomis Constanța (Romania)	3–1	(Belgium) Knack Roeselare	22–25	25–14	25–23	25–20		97–82	Report
4 Dec	20:30	Copra Volley Piacenza (Italy)	3–1	(Switzerland) #Dragons Lugano	25–21	25–17	21–25	25–16		96–79	Report
16 Dec	20:30	Knack Roeselare (Belgium)	2–3	(Romania) Tomis Constanța	20–25	25–20	25–18	24–26	10–15	104–104	Report
17 Dec	19:00	#Dragons Lugano (Switzerland)	2–3	(Italy) Copra Volley Piacenza	18–25	25–22	25–22	33–35	13–15	114–119	Report
20 Jan	20:30	Copra Volley Piacenza (Italy)	3–1	(Belgium) Knack Roeselare	21–25	25–18	25–18	25–20		96–81	Report
21 Jan	20:00	#Dragons Lugano (Switzerland)	1–3	(Romania) Tomis Constanța	19–25	16–25	25–17	20–25		80–92	Report
27 Jan	18:00	Tomis Constanța (Romania)	2–3	(Italy) Copra Volley Piacenza	18–25	25–21	23–25	28–26	16–18	110–115	Report
27 Jan	20:30	Knack Roeselare (Belgium)	3–1	(Switzerland) #Dragons Lugano	25–18	14–25	25–19	25–18		89–80	Report

=== Pool B ===
Pos	Team	Pld	W	L	Pts	SW	SL	SR	SPW	SPL	SPR	Qualification
1	(Russia) Lokomotiv Novosibirsk	6	5	1	15	15	6	2.500	521	437	1.192	Playoffs
2	(Poland) Jastrzębski Węgiel	6	4	2	11	13	8	1.625	471	435	1.083	Playoffs
3	(Spain) CAI Teruel	6	2	4	7	9	12	0.750	457	498	0.918	2014–15 CEV Cup
4	(Bulgaria) Marek Union-Ivkoni Dupnitsa	6	1	5	3	6	17	0.353	453	532	0.852	

Date	Time		Score		Set 1	Set 2	Set 3	Set 4	Set 5	Total	Report
5 Nov	20:30	CAI Teruel (Spain)	0–3	(Poland) Jastrzębski Węgiel	20–25	26–28	20–25			66–78	Report
6 Nov	19:00	Marek Union-Ivkoni Dupnitsa (Bulgaria)	1–3	(Russia) Lokomotiv Novosibirsk	20–25	27–25	16–25	20–25		83–100	Report
18 Nov	18:00	Jastrzębski Węgiel (Poland)	3–0	(Bulgaria) Marek Union-Ivkoni Dupnitsa	25–13	25–16	25–15			75–44	Report
19 Nov	19:00	Lokomotiv Novosibirsk (Russia)	3–1	(Spain) CAI Teruel	25–21	25–15	23–25	25–15		98–76	Report
3 Dec	18:00	Jastrzębski Węgiel (Poland)	1–3	(Russia) Lokomotiv Novosibirsk	25–23	20–25	20–25	19–25		84–98	Report
4 Dec	20:15	CAI Teruel (Spain)	2–3	(Bulgaria) Marek Union-Ivkoni Dupnitsa	18–25	25–18	25–22	19–25	14–16	101–106	Report
18 Dec	19:00	Lokomotiv Novosibirsk (Russia)	3–0	(Poland) Jastrzębski Węgiel	25–16	25–23	25–15			75–54	Report
18 Dec	19:00	Marek Union-Ivkoni Dupnitsa (Bulgaria)	0–3	(Spain) CAI Teruel	21–25	23–25	23–25			67–75	Report
20 Jan	20:15	CAI Teruel (Spain)	3–0	(Russia) Lokomotiv Novosibirsk	29–27	25–23	26–24			80–74	Report
22 Jan	19:00	Marek Union-Ivkoni Dupnitsa (Bulgaria)	2–3	(Poland) Jastrzębski Węgiel	18–25	25–18	25–22	18–25	7–15	93–105	Report
27 Jan	19:00	Lokomotiv Novosibirsk (Russia)	3–0	(Bulgaria) Marek Union-Ivkoni Dupnitsa	26–24	25–18	25–18			76–60	Report
27 Jan	17:30	Jastrzębski Węgiel (Poland)	3–0	(Spain) CAI Teruel	25–14	25–23	25–22			75–59	Report

=== Pool C ===
Pos	Team	Pld	W	L	Pts	SW	SL	SR	SPW	SPL	SPR	Qualification
1	(Poland) Asseco Resovia	6	5	1	14	15	5	3.000	460	400	1.150	Playoffs
2	(Germany) Berlin Recycling Volleys (Note: Qualified as hosts) (H)	6	4	2	14	16	7	2.286	542	478	1.134	Final Four
3	(Montenegro) Budvanska Rivijera Budva	6	2	4	5	7	15	0.467	465	518	0.898	
4	(Slovenia) ACH Volley Ljubljana	6	1	5	3	5	16	0.313	434	505	0.859	

(H) Host
Notes:

Date	Time		Score		Set 1	Set 2	Set 3	Set 4	Set 5	Total	Report
4 Nov	18:00	Asseco Resovia (Poland)	3–0	(Montenegro) Budvanska Rivijera Budva	25–22	25–15	25–18			75–55	Report
6 Nov	19:30	Berlin Recycling Volleys (Germany)	3–1	(Slovenia) ACH Volley Ljubljana	26–28	25–19	28–26	25–16		104–89	Report
19 Nov	20:00	ACH Volley Ljubljana (Slovenia)	0–3	(Poland) Asseco Resovia	19–25	23–25	19–25			61–75	Report
20 Nov	18:00	Budvanska Rivijera Budva (Montenegro)	3–2	(Germany) Berlin Recycling Volleys	25–22	32–30	16–25	22–25	15–12	110–114	Report
4 Dec	18:00	Asseco Resovia (Poland)	0–3	(Germany) Berlin Recycling Volleys	16–25	22–25	19–25			57–75	Report
4 Dec	18:00	Budvanska Rivijera Budva (Montenegro)	3–1	(Slovenia) ACH Volley Ljubljana	25–19	18–25	25–20	25–22		93–86	Report
17 Dec	20:00	ACH Volley Ljubljana (Slovenia)	3–1	(Montenegro) Budvanska Rivijera Budva	18–25	25–18	25–17	25–23		93–83	Report
18 Dec	19:30	Berlin Recycling Volleys (Germany)	2–3	(Poland) Asseco Resovia	19–25	20–25	25–21	25–17	10–15	99–103	Report
21 Jan	18:00	Asseco Resovia (Poland)	3–0	(Slovenia) ACH Volley Ljubljana	25–19	25–12	25–16			75–47	Report
21 Jan	19:30	Berlin Recycling Volleys (Germany)	3–0	(Montenegro) Budvanska Rivijera Budva	25–23	25–22	25–16			75–61	Report
27 Jan	18:00	Budvanska Rivijera Budva (Montenegro)	0–3	(Poland) Asseco Resovia	23–25	19–25	21–25			63–75	Report
27 Jan	19:00	ACH Volley Ljubljana (Slovenia)	0–3	(Germany) Berlin Recycling Volleys	17–25	22–25	19–25			58–75	Report

=== Pool D ===
Pos	Team	Pld	W	L	Pts	SW	SL	SR	SPW	SPL	SPR	Qualification
1	(Russia) Zenit Kazan	6	6	0	18	18	0	MAX	453	344	1.317	Playoffs
2	(Germany) VfB Friedrichshafen	6	3	3	10	11	9	1.222	452	431	1.049	Playoffs
3	(Austria) Posojilnica Aich/Dob	6	2	4	5	7	15	0.467	457	521	0.877	
4	(Greece) Olympiacos Piraeus	6	1	5	3	4	16	0.250	420	486	0.864	

Date	Time		Score		Set 1	Set 2	Set 3	Set 4	Set 5	Total	Report
5 Nov	19:00	Zenit Kazan (Russia)	3–0	(Germany) VfB Friedrichshafen	25–19	25–18	25–14			75–51	Report
5 Nov	20:25	Posojilnica Aich/Dob (Austria)	1–3	(Greece) Olympiacos Piraeus	25–21	25–27	17–25	23–25		90–98	Report
19 Nov	18:00	Olympiacos Piraeus (Greece)	0–3	(Russia) Zenit Kazan	26–28	19–25	20–25			65–78	Report
19 Nov	20:00	VfB Friedrichshafen (Germany)	2–3	(Austria) Posojilnica Aich/Dob	25–23	25–17	24–26	24–26	13–15	111–107	Report
3 Dec	19:00	Zenit Kazan (Russia)	3–0	(Austria) Posojilnica Aich/Dob	25–20	25–14	25–15			75–49	Report
3 Dec	20:00	VfB Friedrichshafen (Germany)	3–0	(Greece) Olympiacos Piraeus	25–19	25–17	25–18			75–54	Report
17 Dec	20:25	Posojilnica Aich/Dob (Austria)	0–3	(Russia) Zenit Kazan	18–25	23–25	20–25			61–75	Report
18 Dec	18:00	Olympiacos Piraeus (Greece)	0–3	(Germany) VfB Friedrichshafen	22–25	23–25	18–25			63–75	Report
21 Jan	19:00	Zenit Kazan (Russia)	3–0	(Greece) Olympiacos Piraeus	25–20	25–14	25–19			75–53	Report
21 Jan	20:25	Posojilnica Aich/Dob (Austria)	0–3	(Germany) VfB Friedrichshafen	19–25	23–25	15–25			57–75	Report
27 Jan	18:00	Olympiacos Piraeus (Greece)	1–3	(Austria) Posojilnica Aich/Dob	18–25	23–25	25–18	21–25		87–93	Report
27 Jan	20:00	VfB Friedrichshafen (Germany)	0–3	(Russia) Zenit Kazan	21–25	22–25	22–25			65–75	Report

=== Pool E ===
Pos	Team	Pld	W	L	Pts	SW	SL	SR	SPW	SPL	SPR	Qualification
1	(Russia) Belogorie Belgorod	6	5	1	15	16	5	3.200	507	439	1.155	Playoffs
2	(Italy) Cucine Lube Treia	6	3	3	10	12	10	1.200	509	481	1.058	Playoffs
3	(Turkey) Fenerbahçe SK Istanbul	6	3	3	7	11	14	0.786	537	574	0.936	2014–15 CEV Cup
4	(France) Paris Volley	6	1	5	4	6	16	0.375	462	521	0.887	

Date	Time		Score		Set 1	Set 2	Set 3	Set 4	Set 5	Total	Report
5 Nov	19:00	Fenerbahçe SK Istanbul (Turkey)	3–2	(Italy) Cucine Lube Treia	25–21	28–30	21–25	25–23	15–9	114–108	Report
6 Nov	20:30	Paris Volley (France)	0–3	(Russia) Belogorie Belgorod	18–25	14–25	22–25			54–75	Report
18 Nov	19:00	Belogorie Belgorod (Russia)	3–1	(Turkey) Fenerbahçe SK Istanbul	25–18	25–16	22–25	25–19		97–78	Report
20 Nov	20:30	Cucine Lube Treia (Italy)	3–0	(France) Paris Volley	25–22	25–19	25–20			75–61	Report
3 Dec	19:00	Fenerbahçe SK Istanbul (Turkey)	3–2	(France) Paris Volley	23–25	23–25	25–22	25–22	16–14	112–108	Report
3 Dec	20:30	Cucine Lube Treia (Italy)	1–3	(Russia) Belogorie Belgorod	25–22	23–25	19–25	23–25		90–97	Report
17 Dec	19:00	Belogorie Belgorod (Russia)	3–0	(Italy) Cucine Lube Treia	25–22	25–22	25–19			75–63	Report
17 Dec	20:30	Paris Volley (France)	3–1	(Turkey) Fenerbahçe SK Istanbul	25–18	25–23	23–25	25–20		98–86	Report
20 Jan	19:00	Fenerbahçe SK Istanbul (Turkey)	3–1	(Russia) Belogorie Belgorod	25–21	22–25	25–23	25–19		97–88	Report
20 Jan	20:30	Paris Volley (France)	1–3	(Italy) Cucine Lube Treia	18–25	21–25	25–23	20–25		84–98	Report
27 Jan	19:00	Belogorie Belgorod (Russia)	3–0	(France) Paris Volley	25–19	25–18	25–20			75–57	Report
27 Jan	20:30	Cucine Lube Treia (Italy)	3–0	(Turkey) Fenerbahçe SK Istanbul	25–14	25–15	25–21			75–50	Report

=== Pool F ===
Pos	Team	Pld	W	L	Pts	SW	SL	SR	SPW	SPL	SPR	Qualification
1	(Poland) PGE Skra Bełchatów	6	6	0	18	18	2	9.000	500	405	1.235	Playoffs
2	(Belgium) Precura Antwerpen	6	3	3	9	11	10	1.100	478	478	1.000	2014–15 CEV Cup
3	(Austria) Hypo Tirol Innsbruck	6	2	4	6	8	13	0.615	501	504	0.994	
4	(Czech Republic) Jihostroj České Budějovice	6	1	5	3	4	16	0.250	399	491	0.813	

Date	Time		Score		Set 1	Set 2	Set 3	Set 4	Set 5	Total	Report
5 Nov	18:30	Jihostroj České Budějovice (Czech Republic)	1–3	(Poland) PGE Skra Bełchatów	20–25	25–22	17–25	19–25		81–97	Report
5 Nov	20:30	Precura Antwerpen (Belgium)	3–1	(Austria) Hypo Tirol Innsbruck	22–25	25–15	29–27	25–23		101–90	Report
19 Nov	18:00	PGE Skra Bełchatów (Poland)	3–0	(Belgium) Precura Antwerpen	25–17	25–18	25–17			75–52	Report
19 Nov	20:25	Hypo Tirol Innsbruck (Austria)	3–0	(Czech Republic) Jihostroj České Budějovice	25–22	25–19	25–14			75–55	Report
2 Dec	20:25	Hypo Tirol Innsbruck (Austria)	0–3	(Poland) PGE Skra Bełchatów	21–25	27–29	24–26			72–80	Report
4 Dec	20:30	Precura Antwerpen (Belgium)	3–0	(Czech Republic) Jihostroj České Budějovice	25–20	25–14	25–16			75–50	Report
17 Dec	18:00	PGE Skra Bełchatów (Poland)	3–0	(Austria) Hypo Tirol Innsbruck	25–22	25–23	25–23			75–68	Report
17 Dec	18:00	Jihostroj České Budějovice (Czech Republic)	0–3	(Belgium) Precura Antwerpen	23–25	23–25	17–25			63–75	Report
21 Jan	18:00	Jihostroj České Budějovice (Czech Republic)	3–1	(Austria) Hypo Tirol Innsbruck	25–22	25–23	21–25	25–23		96–93	Report
21 Jan	20:30	Precura Antwerpen (Belgium)	1–3	(Poland) PGE Skra Bełchatów	25–22	14–25	20–25	19–25		78–97	Report
27 Jan	20:00	PGE Skra Bełchatów (Poland)	3–0	(Czech Republic) Jihostroj České Budějovice	25–17	25–13	26–24			76–54	Report
27 Jan	20:25	Hypo Tirol Innsbruck (Austria)	3–1	(Belgium) Precura Antwerpen	31–29	25–23	22–25	25–20		103–97	Report

=== Pool G ===
Pos	Team	Pld	W	L	Pts	SW	SL	SR	SPW	SPL	SPR	Qualification
1	(Italy) Sir Safety Perugia	6	5	1	14	16	6	2.667	526	484	1.087	Playoffs
2	(Turkey) Halkbank Ankara	6	5	1	14	16	9	1.778	605	541	1.118	Playoffs
3	(France) Tours VB	6	1	5	5	9	15	0.600	521	563	0.925	
4	(Belgium) Noliko Maaseik	6	1	5	3	6	17	0.353	475	539	0.881	

Date	Time		Score		Set 1	Set 2	Set 3	Set 4	Set 5	Total	Report
4 Nov	20:30	Noliko Maaseik (Belgium)	3–2	(France) Tours VB	22–25	22–25	25–20	25–17	16–14	110–101	Report
6 Nov	20:30	Sir Safety Perugia (Italy)	3–1	(Turkey) Halkbank Ankara	25–23	23–25	25–23	30–28		103–99	Report
19 Nov	19:00	Halkbank Ankara (Turkey)	3–1	(Belgium) Noliko Maaseik	25–17	21–25	25–15	25–23		96–80	Report
19 Nov	20:30	Tours VB (France)	2–3	(Italy) Sir Safety Perugia	28–26	25–27	25–23	26–28	11–15	115–119	Report
2 Dec	20:30	Noliko Maaseik (Belgium)	0–3	(Italy) Sir Safety Perugia	22–25	15–25	18–25			55–75	Report
3 Dec	20:30	Tours VB (France)	1–3	(Turkey) Halkbank Ankara	22–25	26–24	20–25	17–25		85–99	Report
17 Dec	19:00	Halkbank Ankara (Turkey)	3–1	(France) Tours VB	23–25	28–26	25–19	25–12		101–82	Report
17 Dec	20:30	Sir Safety Perugia (Italy)	3–0	(Belgium) Noliko Maaseik	25–19	25–20	25–20			75–59	Report
20 Jan	20:30	Noliko Maaseik (Belgium)	2–3	(Turkey) Halkbank Ankara	25–21	23–25	25–23	30–32	9–15	112–116	Report
22 Jan	20:30	Sir Safety Perugia (Italy)	3–0	(France) Tours VB	25–19	25–23	25–20			75–62	Report
27 Jan	19:00	Halkbank Ankara (Turkey)	3–1	(Italy) Sir Safety Perugia	25–17	19–25	25–19	25–18		94–79	Report
27 Jan	20:30	Tours VB (France)	3–0	(Belgium) Noliko Maaseik	25–15	26–24	25–20			76–59	Report

== Playoffs ==
The playoffs will consist of two rounds: Playoff 12 and Playoff 6. Each round is played in two legs. These will be played between 10 February and 12 March 2015.

If the teams are tied after two legs, a "Golden Set" is played. The winner is the team that first obtains 15 points, provided that the points difference between the two teams is at least 2 points (thus, the Golden Set is similar to a tiebreak set in a normal match).

At each leg, points are awarded to the teams in the same manner as in the Group Round (3 for 3:0 or 3:1, 2 for 3:2 etc.). So, if team A defeat team B in the first leg 3:0 and lose in the second leg 1:3, team A does not advance to the next round (as it would have been expected on the basis of analogy with football competitions), but the two teams are tied with 3 points each, and a Golden Set is played.

The three teams that win in Playoff 6 round advance to the Final Four along with the organizer of the Final Four, Berlin Recycling Volleys. Italy's Cucine Lube Treia replaced in the Playoffs 12 the organizer of the Final Four tournament as the lucky loser.

Pool	Winners	Second place
A	(Romania) Tomis Constanța	(Italy) Copra Volley Piacenza
B	(Russia) Lokomotiv Novosibirsk	(Poland) Jastrzębski Węgiel
C	(Poland) Asseco Resovia	(Germany) Berlin Recycling Volleys (F4 Hosts)
D	(Russia) Zenit Kazan	(Germany) VfB Friedrichshafen
E	(Russia) Belogorie Belgorod	(Italy) Cucine Lube Treia
F	(Poland) PGE Skra Bełchatów	
G	(Italy) Sir Safety Perugia	(Turkey) Halkbank Ankara

- All times are local.

=== Playoff 12 ===
Team 1	Agg.	Team 2	1st leg	2nd leg	Golden Set
VfB Friedrichshafen (Germany)	1–5	(Poland) Asseco Resovia	2–3	1–3	
Tomis Constanța (Romania)	0–6	(Russia) Lokomotiv Novosibirsk	0–3	0–3	
Jastrzębski Węgiel (Poland)	1–5	(Italy) Sir Safety Perugia	2–3	0–3	
Cucine Lube Treia (Italy)	0–6	(Poland) PGE Skra Bełchatów	0–3	1–3	
Copra Volley Piacenza (Italy)	1–5	(Russia) Zenit Kazan	0–3	2–3	
Halkbank Ankara (Turkey)	3–3	(Russia) Belogorie Belgorod	3–1	1–3	15–11

==== First leg ====
Date	Time		Score		Set 1	Set 2	Set 3	Set 4	Set 5	Total	Report
11 Feb	20:00	VfB Friedrichshafen (Germany)	2–3	(Poland) Asseco Resovia	25–19	24–26	25–20	17–25	15–17	106–107	Report
11 Feb	18:00	Tomis Constanța (Romania)	0–3	(Russia) Lokomotiv Novosibirsk	16–25	13–25	15–25			44–75	Report
12 Feb	17:30	Jastrzębski Węgiel (Poland)	2–3	(Italy) Sir Safety Perugia	25–18	21–25	25–27	26–24	11–15	108–109	Report
11 Feb	20:30	Cucine Lube Treia (Italy)	0–3	(Poland) PGE Skra Bełchatów	22–25	19–25	13–25			54–75	Report
12 Feb	20:30	Copra Volley Piacenza (Italy)	0–3	(Russia) Zenit Kazan	22–25	22–25	19–25			63–75	Report
10 Feb	19:00	Halkbank Ankara (Turkey)	3–1	(Russia) Belogorie Belgorod	25–20	20–25	26–24	28–26		99–95	Report

==== Second leg ====
Date	Time		Score		Set 1	Set 2	Set 3	Set 4	Set 5	Total	Report
18 Feb	20:30	Asseco Resovia (Poland)	3–1	(Germany) VfB Friedrichshafen	25–18	25–16	22–25	25–17		97–76	Report
18 Feb	19:00	Lokomotiv Novosibirsk (Russia)	3–0	(Romania) Tomis Constanța	25–13	25–12	25–21			75–46	Report
18 Feb	20:30	Sir Safety Perugia (Italy)	3–0	(Poland) Jastrzębski Węgiel	25–18	25–22	25–17			75–57	Report
19 Feb	18:00	PGE Skra Bełchatów (Poland)	3–1	(Italy) Cucine Lube Treia	26–24	19–25	25–22	25–21		95–92	Report
19 Feb	18:30	Zenit Kazan (Russia)	3–2	(Italy) Copra Volley Piacenza	25–13	24–26	25–14	30–32	15–10	119–95	Report
17 Feb	19:00	Belogorie Belgorod (Russia)	3–1	(Turkey) Halkbank Ankara	14–25	25–17	25–16	25–22		89–80	Report
Golden set		Belogorie Belgorod (Russia)	11–15	(Turkey) Halkbank Ankara							

=== Playoff 6 ===
Team 1	Agg.	Team 2	1st leg	2nd leg
Lokomotiv Novosibirsk (Russia)	2–4	(Poland) Asseco Resovia	1–3	3–2
Sir Safety Perugia (Italy)	2–4	(Poland) PGE Skra Bełchatów	3–2	1–3
Zenit Kazan (Russia)	4–2	(Turkey) Halkbank Ankara	3–0	2–3

==== First leg ====
Date	Time		Score		Set 1	Set 2	Set 3	Set 4	Set 5	Total	Report
4 Mar	19:00	Lokomotiv Novosibirsk (Russia)	1–3	(Poland) Asseco Resovia	25–20	21–25	27–29	17–25		90–99	Report
4 Mar	20:30	Sir Safety Perugia (Italy)	3–2	(Poland) PGE Skra Bełchatów	25–17	20–25	25–23	23–25	16–14	109–104	Report
4 Mar	19:00	Zenit Kazan (Russia)	3–0	(Turkey) Halkbank Ankara	25–19	25–18	25–17			75–54	Report

==== Second leg ====
Date	Time		Score		Set 1	Set 2	Set 3	Set 4	Set 5	Total	Report
11 Mar	20:30	Asseco Resovia (Poland)	2–3	(Russia) Lokomotiv Novosibirsk	20–25	25–19	25–22	19–25	15–17	104–108	Report
11 Mar	18:00	PGE Skra Bełchatów (Poland)	3–1	(Italy) Sir Safety Perugia	16–25	25–22	25–23	25–18		91–88	Report
11 Mar	19:00	Halkbank Ankara (Turkey)	3–2	(Russia) Zenit Kazan	25–23	17–25	25–18	23–25	16–14	106–105	Report

== Final four ==
- Organizer: (Germany) Berlin Recycling Volleys
- Place: Berlin
- All times on 28 March are Central European Time (UTC+01:00) and all times on 29 March are Central European Summer Time (UTC+02:00).

Semifinals
28 March
(Russia) Zenit Kazan	3
(Germany) Berlin Recycling Volleys	1
28 March
(Poland) Asseco Resovia	3
(Poland) PGE Skra Bełchatów	0

Final
29 March
(Russia) Zenit Kazan	3
(Poland) Asseco Resovia	0
3rd place match
29 March
(Germany) Berlin Recycling Volleys	3
(Poland) PGE Skra Bełchatów	2

=== Semifinals ===
Date	Time		Score		Set 1	Set 2	Set 3	Set 4	Set 5	Total	Report
28 Mar	17:00	Zenit Kazan (Russia)	3–1	(Germany) Berlin Recycling Volleys	26–24	21–25	25–22	25–15		97–86	Report
28 Mar	20:00	Asseco Resovia (Poland)	3–0	(Poland) PGE Skra Bełchatów	25–23	25–23	25–22			75–68	Report

=== 3rd place match ===
Date	Time		Score		Set 1	Set 2	Set 3	Set 4	Set 5	Total	Report
29 Mar	13:00	Berlin Recycling Volleys (Germany)	3–2	(Poland) PGE Skra Bełchatów	25–21	19–25	25–20	26–28	23–21	118–115	Report

=== Final ===
Date	Time		Score		Set 1	Set 2	Set 3	Set 4	Set 5	Total	Report
29 Mar	15:45	Zenit Kazan (Russia)	3–0	(Poland) Asseco Resovia	25–22	25–23	25–21			75–66	Report

== Final standings ==
Qualified for the 2015 FIVB Club World Championship

Rank	Team
1st place, gold medalist(s)	(Russia) Zenit Kazan
2nd place, silver medalist(s)	(Poland) Asseco Resovia
3rd place, bronze medalist(s)	(Germany) Berlin Recycling Volleys
4	(Poland) PGE Skra Bełchatów

2014–15 CEV Champions League winners

3rd title

== Awards ==
- Most valuable player
  (Cuba) Wilfredo León (Zenit Kazan)
- Best setter
  (Poland) Fabian Drzyzga (Asseco Resovia)
- Best outside spikers
  (Cuba) Wilfredo León (Zenit Kazan)
  (Argentina) Facundo Conte (PGE Skra Bełchatów)
- Best middle blockers
  (Poland) Piotr Nowakowski (Asseco Resovia)
  (Netherlands) Rob Bontje (Berlin Recycling Volleys)
- Best opposite spiker
  (Russia) Maxim Mikhaylov (Zenit Kazan)
- Best libero
  (Bulgaria) Teodor Salparov (Zenit Kazan)
