= 2018–19 PlusLiga =

- League: PlusLiga
- Sport: Volleyball
- Duration: 12 October 2018 – 4 May 2019
- Number of games: 191
- Number of teams: 13/14
- TV partner(s): Polsat Sport
- League champions: ZAKSA Kędzierzyn-Koźle (8th title)

Seasons
- ← 2017–18 2019–20 →

The 2018–19 PlusLiga was the 83rd season of the Polish Volleyball Championship, the 19th season as a professional league organized by the Polish Volleyball League SA (Polish: Polska Liga Siatkówki SA) under the supervision of the Polish Volleyball Federation (Polish: Polski Związek Piłki Siatkowej).

Due to financial issues of Stocznia Szczecin, the players have not received their salaries since the beginning of the season and most of them decided to leave the club by terminating their contracts by mutual agreement in late November or early December. On 13 December 2018, Stocznia withdrew from the competition.

ZAKSA Kędzierzyn-Koźle won their 8th title of the Polish Champions.

== Regular season ==
Ranking system:

1. Points
2. Number of victories
3. Set ratio
4. Setpoint ratio
5. H2H results

Result	Winners	Losers
3–0	3 points	0 points
3–1	3 points	0 points
3–2	2 points	1 point

Pos	Team	Pld	W	L	Pts	SW	SL	SR	SPW	SPL	SPR	Qualification
1	ZAKSA Kędzierzyn-Koźle	24	21	3	62	65	22	2.955	2130	1873	1.137	Semifinals
2	Onico Warsaw	24	19	5	57	61	28	2.179	2099	1847	1.136	Semifinals
3	Jastrzębski Węgiel	24	17	7	50	55	34	1.618	2043	1923	1.062	Quarterfinals
4	Aluron Virtu Warta Zawiercie	24	15	9	43	54	42	1.286	2172	2128	1.021	Quarterfinals
5	Cerrad Czarni Radom	24	14	10	42	48	37	1.297	1933	1864	1.037	Quarterfinals
6	PGE Skra Bełchatów	24	14	10	38	51	45	1.133	2216	2172	1.020	Quarterfinals
7	Asseco Resovia	24	11	13	35	42	48	0.875	2077	2058	1.009	
8	GKS Katowice	24	11	13	32	44	47	0.936	2042	2066	0.988	
9	Indykpol AZS Olsztyn	24	9	15	30	45	51	0.882	2095	2187	0.958	
10	Trefl Gdańsk	24	9	15	28	41	53	0.774	2070	2128	0.973	
11	Chemik Bydgoszcz	24	7	17	22	32	57	0.561	1903	2090	0.911	
12	Cuprum Lubin	24	7	17	20	29	57	0.509	1829	1977	0.925	
13	MKS Będzin	24	2	22	9	22	68	0.324	1881	2177	0.864	

Source: PlusLiga

=== 1st round ===
Date	Time		Score		Set 1	Set 2	Set 3	Set 4	Set 5	Total	Report
15 Oct	18:00	Chemik Bydgoszcz	3–2	PGE Skra Bełchatów	21–25	25–23	25–19	27–29	18–16	116–112	
13 Oct	17:30	MKS Będzin	1–3	ZAKSA Kędzierzyn-Koźle	29–27	18–25	22–25	23–25		92–102	
29 Nov	19:00	Stocznia Szczecin	0–3	Trefl Gdańsk	23–25	20–25	21–25			64–75	
14 Oct	17:30	GKS Katowice	3–1	Indykpol AZS Olsztyn	25–23	25–17	23–25	25–23		98–88	
12 Oct	18:00	Cerrad Czarni Radom	0–3	Jastrzębski Węgiel	23–25	19–25	20–25			62–75	
13 Oct	14:45	Aluron Virtu Warta Zawiercie	3–2	Asseco Resovia	25–23	23–25	25–19	21–25	15–13	109–105	
12 Oct	20:30	Onico Warsaw	3–0	Cuprum Lubin	25–22	25–21	25–19			75–62	

=== 2nd round ===
Date	Time		Score		Set 1	Set 2	Set 3	Set 4	Set 5	Total	Report
17 Oct	18:00	Cuprum Lubin	1–3	Chemik Bydgoszcz	19–25	23–25	25–16	22–25		89–91	
17 Oct	20:30	Asseco Resovia	1–3	Onico Warsaw	18–25	23–25	25–23	21–25		87–98	
17 Oct	18:00	Aluron Virtu Warta Zawiercie	2–3	Jastrzębski Węgiel	20–25	25–21	25–13	22–25	13–15	105–99	
17 Oct	18:00	Indykpol AZS Olsztyn	0–3	Cerrad Czarni Radom	22–25	22–25	17–25			61–75	
17 Oct	18:30	Trefl Gdańsk	3–2	GKS Katowice	25–21	19–25	15–25	25–22	16–14	100–107	
17 Oct	18:00	Stocznia Szczecin	0–3	ZAKSA Kędzierzyn-Koźle	26–28	16–25	21–25			63–78	
17 Oct	17:00	PGE Skra Bełchatów	3–1	MKS Będzin	25–21	25–27	25–18	25–20		100–86	

=== 3rd round ===
Date	Time		Score		Set 1	Set 2	Set 3	Set 4	Set 5	Total	Report
19 Oct	18:00	ZAKSA Kędzierzyn-Koźle	3–0	Chemik Bydgoszcz	25–15	25–14	25–18			75–47	
20 Oct	14:45	PGE Skra Bełchatów	3–2	Trefl Gdańsk	20–25	25–23	25–19	16–25	15–11	101–103	
20 Oct	17:30	Indykpol AZS Olsztyn	3–0	MKS Będzin	26–24	25–23	25–15			76–62	
21 Oct	14:45	Jastrzębski Węgiel	0–3	Stocznia Szczecin	22–25	24–26	25–27			71–78	
22 Oct	18:00	Asseco Resovia	0–3	GKS Katowice	22–25	19–25	34–36			75–86	
21 Oct	17:30	Cuprum Lubin	0–3	Cerrad Czarni Radom	18–25	19–25	25–27			62–77	
21 Oct	20:00	Onico Warsaw	3–1	Aluron Virtu Warta Zawiercie	25–17	25–21	20–25	25–23		95–86	

=== 4th round ===
Date	Time		Score		Set 1	Set 2	Set 3	Set 4	Set 5	Total	Report
27 Oct	17:30	Chemik Bydgoszcz	0–3	Aluron Virtu Warta Zawiercie	20–25	18–25	13–25			51–75	
26 Oct	20:30	Cerrad Czarni Radom	3–0	Onico Warsaw	25–21	25–22	25–22			75–65	
26 Oct	18:00	GKS Katowice	0–3	Cuprum Lubin	21–25	22–25	24–26			67–76	
28 Oct	20:00	Stocznia Szczecin	3–0	Asseco Resovia	25–19	25–23	25–19			75–61	
29 Oct	18:00	MKS Będzin	2–3	Jastrzębski Węgiel	21–25	25–21	25–19	13–25	10–15	94–105	
27 Oct	14:45	PGE Skra Bełchatów	0–3	Indykpol AZS Olsztyn	24–26	17–25	22–25			63–76	
28 Oct	17:30	ZAKSA Kędzierzyn-Koźle	3–0	Trefl Gdańsk	25–21	26–24	25–23			76–68	

=== 5th round ===
Date	Time		Score		Set 1	Set 2	Set 3	Set 4	Set 5	Total	Report
4 Nov	17:30	Trefl Gdańsk	3–1	Chemik Bydgoszcz	23–25	25–17	26–24	25–21		99–87	
2 Nov	20:30	Indykpol AZS Olsztyn	1–3	ZAKSA Kędzierzyn-Koźle	22–25	28–30	25–23	16–25		91–103	
3 Nov	14:45	Jastrzębski Węgiel	3–1	PGE Skra Bełchatów	25–22	17–25	27–25	25–21		94–93	
3 Nov	17:30	Asseco Resovia	0–3	MKS Będzin	33–35	14–25	22–25			69–85	
3 Nov	20:00	Cuprum Lubin	0–3	Stocznia Szczecin	21–25	10–25	23–25			54–75	
4 Dec	20:30	Onico Warsaw	3–1	GKS Katowice	23–25	25–17	25–15	25–18		98–75	
4 Nov	14:45	Aluron Virtu Warta Zawiercie	0–3	Cerrad Czarni Radom	13–25	23–25	19–25			55–75	

=== 6th round ===
Date	Time		Score		Set 1	Set 2	Set 3	Set 4	Set 5	Total	Report
7 Nov	18:00	Chemik Bydgoszcz	1–3	Cerrad Czarni Radom	19–25	25–19	23–25	18–25		85–94	
7 Nov	18:00	Aluron Virtu Warta Zawiercie	3–1	GKS Katowice	25–27	25–22	25–18	25–23		100–90	
8 Nov	20:30	Stocznia Szczecin	3–1	Onico Warsaw	25–20	16–25	25–17	25–21		91–83	
7 Nov	18:00	MKS Będzin	1–3	Cuprum Lubin	23–25	14–25	25–23	21–25		83–98	
7 Nov	18:00	PGE Skra Bełchatów	3–1	Asseco Resovia	32–30	21–25	26–24	25–21		104–100	
7 Nov	20:30	ZAKSA Kędzierzyn-Koźle	3–0	Jastrzębski Węgiel	25–18	25–22	25–20			75–60	
31 Oct	18:00	Trefl Gdańsk	3–2	Indykpol AZS Olsztyn	19–25	22–25	25–20	31–29	15–6	112–105	

=== 7th round ===
Date	Time		Score		Set 1	Set 2	Set 3	Set 4	Set 5	Total	Report
10 Nov	20:00	Indykpol AZS Olsztyn	3–0	Chemik Bydgoszcz	30–28	25–17	26–24			81–69	
10 Nov	14:45	Jastrzębski Węgiel	3–0	Trefl Gdańsk	25–22	25–16	25–18			75–56	
11 Nov	14:45	Asseco Resovia	2–3	ZAKSA Kędzierzyn-Koźle	13–25	26–28	25–20	25–23	18–20	107–116	
10 Nov	17:30	Cuprum Lubin	0–3	PGE Skra Bełchatów	16–25	17–25	22–25			55–75	
12 Nov	18:00	MKS Będzin	1–3	Onico Warsaw	25–22	17–25	17–25	20–25		79–97	
11 Nov	17:30	Aluron Virtu Warta Zawiercie	3–0	Stocznia Szczecin	26–24	25–23	26–24			77–71	
12 Nov	20:30	Cerrad Czarni Radom	3–0	GKS Katowice	25–18	25–16	25–22			75–56	

=== 8th round ===
Date	Time		Score		Set 1	Set 2	Set 3	Set 4	Set 5	Total	Report
17 Nov	17:30	Chemik Bydgoszcz	3–1	GKS Katowice	19–25	25–21	25–21	25–15		94–82	
18 Nov	17:30	Stocznia Szczecin	3–1	Cerrad Czarni Radom	25–16	25–23	22–25	25–23		97–87	
19 Nov	18:00	MKS Będzin	2–3	Aluron Virtu Warta Zawiercie	25–20	21–25	21–25	25–20	12–15	104–105	
17 Nov	14:45	PGE Skra Bełchatów	3–0	Onico Warsaw	25–21	25–21	25–20			75–62	
16 Nov	20:30	ZAKSA Kędzierzyn-Koźle	3–0	Cuprum Lubin	25–16	25–22	25–14			75–52	
16 Nov	18:00	Trefl Gdańsk	1–3	Asseco Resovia	16–25	25–22	20–25	22–25		83–97	
18 Nov	14:45	Indykpol AZS Olsztyn	1–3	Jastrzębski Węgiel	22–25	25–27	25–18	14–25		86–95	

=== 9th round ===
Date	Time		Score		Set 1	Set 2	Set 3	Set 4	Set 5	Total	Report
26 Nov	18:00	Jastrzębski Węgiel	0–3	Chemik Bydgoszcz	23–25	16–25	22–25			61–75	
23 Nov	20:30	Asseco Resovia	2–3	Indykpol AZS Olsztyn	23–25	23–25	25–18	25–16	11–15	107–99	
25 Nov	14:45	Cuprum Lubin	0–3	Trefl Gdańsk	19–25	21–25	20–25			60–75	
27 Nov	19:00	Onico Warsaw	1–3	ZAKSA Kędzierzyn-Koźle	17–25	19–25	25–18	13–25		74–93	
24 Nov	17:30	Aluron Virtu Warta Zawiercie	3–1	PGE Skra Bełchatów	25–20	25–20	25–27	25–21		100–88	
23 Nov	18:00	Cerrad Czarni Radom	3–0	MKS Będzin	25–12	25–16	25–17			75–45	
24 Nov	14:45	GKS Katowice	3–1	Stocznia Szczecin	25–23	28–26	17–25	25–12		95–86	

=== 10th round ===
Date	Time		Score		Set 1	Set 2	Set 3	Set 4	Set 5	Total	Report
10 Dec	18:00	MKS Będzin	2–3	GKS Katowice	22–25	25–23	20–25	25–23	24–26	116–122	
9 Dec	14:45	PGE Skra Bełchatów	3–1	Cerrad Czarni Radom	16–25	25–23	25–21	25–19		91–88	
8 Dec	17:30	ZAKSA Kędzierzyn-Koźle	3–1	Aluron Virtu Warta Zawiercie	25–19	20–25	25–17	28–26		98–87	
7 Dec	20:30	Trefl Gdańsk	1–3	Onico Warsaw	25–20	18–25	15–25	14–25		72–95	
9 Dec	17:30	Indykpol AZS Olsztyn	2–3	Cuprum Lubin	25–11	10–25	25–22	18–25	11–15	89–98	
8 Dec	14:45	Jastrzębski Węgiel	3–1	Asseco Resovia	25–23	27–29	25–18	25–21		102–91	

=== 11th round ===
Date	Time		Score		Set 1	Set 2	Set 3	Set 4	Set 5	Total	Report
12 Dec	18:00	Asseco Resovia	3–2	Chemik Bydgoszcz	27–25	22–25	26–24	26–28	16–14	117–116	
12 Dec	18:00	Cuprum Lubin	2–3	Jastrzębski Węgiel	25–23	19–25	20–25	25–21	9–15	98–109	
12 Dec	20:30	Onico Warsaw	3–1	Indykpol AZS Olsztyn	25–18	25–21	21–25	25–11		96–75	
12 Dec	18:00	Aluron Virtu Warta Zawiercie	3–2	Trefl Gdańsk	25–23	25–19	27–29	20–25	15–10	112–106	
12 Dec	17:30	Cerrad Czarni Radom	0–3	ZAKSA Kędzierzyn-Koźle	21–25	18–25	20–25			59–75	
12 Dec	19:00	GKS Katowice	3–0	PGE Skra Bełchatów	25–23	25–17	25–19			75–59	

=== 12th round ===
Date	Time		Score		Set 1	Set 2	Set 3	Set 4	Set 5	Total	Report
17 Dec	17:30	Chemik Bydgoszcz	3–0	MKS Będzin	25–18	25–21	25–20			75–59	
15 Dec	17:30	ZAKSA Kędzierzyn-Koźle	3–1	GKS Katowice	23–25	25–19	25–18	25–20		98–82	
16 Dec	14:45	Trefl Gdańsk	0–3	Cerrad Czarni Radom	23–25	20–25	18–25			61–75	
15 Dec	20:30	Indykpol AZS Olsztyn	2–3	Aluron Virtu Warta Zawiercie	23–25	18–25	25–23	25–17	9–15	100–105	
16 Dec	17:30	Jastrzębski Węgiel	2–3	Onico Warsaw	22–25	17–25	25–19	25–20	11–15	100–104	
16 Dec	20:30	Asseco Resovia	3–0	Cuprum Lubin	25–21	25–22	25–15			75–58	

=== 13th round ===
Date	Time		Score		Set 1	Set 2	Set 3	Set 4	Set 5	Total	Report
21 Dec	20:30	Chemik Bydgoszcz	1–3	Onico Warsaw	25–22	18–25	19–25	19–25		81–97	
21 Dec	17:30	Aluron Virtu Warta Zawiercie	3–1	Cuprum Lubin	25–22	25–20	15–25	25–23		90–90	
20 Dec	20:30	Cerrad Czarni Radom	1–3	Asseco Resovia	22–25	22–25	28–26	16–25		88–101	
22 Dec	17:30	Jastrzębski Węgiel	3–0	GKS Katowice	25–18	25–20	25–20			75–58	
22 Dec	20:30	MKS Będzin	0–3	Trefl Gdańsk	23–25	23–25	19–25			65–75	
22 Dec	14:45	PGE Skra Bełchatów	1–3	ZAKSA Kędzierzyn-Koźle	25–27	25–23	20–25	22–25		92–100	

=== 14th round ===
Date	Time		Score		Set 1	Set 2	Set 3	Set 4	Set 5	Total	Report
28 Dec	17:30	PGE Skra Bełchatów	3–0	Chemik Bydgoszcz	25–22	25–21	25–15			75–58	
30 Nov	20:30	ZAKSA Kędzierzyn-Koźle	3–0	MKS Będzin	25–16	25–18	25–22			75–56	
28 Dec	20:30	Indykpol AZS Olsztyn	1–3	GKS Katowice	19–25	18–25	25–21	15–25		77–96	
29 Dec	14:45	Jastrzębski Węgiel	3–0	Cerrad Czarni Radom	25–16	25–16	25–20			75–52	
1 Feb	20:30	Asseco Resovia	0–3	Aluron Virtu Warta Zawiercie	21–25	23–25	22–25			66–75	
21 Nov	18:00	Cuprum Lubin	1–3	Onico Warsaw	19–25	27–25	23–25	16–25		85–100	

=== 15th round ===
Date	Time		Score		Set 1	Set 2	Set 3	Set 4	Set 5	Total	Report
13 Jan	20:30	Chemik Bydgoszcz	2–3	Cuprum Lubin	25–19	25–22	17–25	23–25	10–15	100–106	
12 Jan	14:45	Onico Warsaw	3–0	Asseco Resovia	25–18	25–21	25–14			75–53	
14 Jan	17:30	Jastrzębski Węgiel	3–1	Aluron Virtu Warta Zawiercie	25–21	25–15	22–25	25–14		97–75	
13 Jan	14:45	Cerrad Czarni Radom	3–2	Indykpol AZS Olsztyn	16–25	25–20	25–14	18–25	15–7	99–91	
11 Jan	20:30	GKS Katowice	3–1	Trefl Gdańsk	25–20	27–29	25–19	25–18		102–86	
11 Jan	17:30	MKS Będzin	0–3	PGE Skra Bełchatów	22–25	14–25	20–25			56–75	

=== 16th round ===
Date	Time		Score		Set 1	Set 2	Set 3	Set 4	Set 5	Total	Report
19 Jan	20:30	Chemik Bydgoszcz	0–3	ZAKSA Kędzierzyn-Koźle	14–25	20–25	20–25			54–75	
11 Mar	20:30	Trefl Gdańsk	2–3	PGE Skra Bełchatów	25–27	25–27	25–18	25–22	11–15	111–109	
21 Jan	20:30	MKS Będzin	0–3	Indykpol AZS Olsztyn	14–25	36–38	19–25			69–88	
20 Jan	17:30	GKS Katowice	3–0	Asseco Resovia	25–21	25–23	25–18			75–62	
18 Jan	17:30	Cerrad Czarni Radom	3–1	Cuprum Lubin	25–20	25–20	15–25	25–17		90–82	
19 Jan	14:45	Aluron Virtu Warta Zawiercie	3–1	Onico Warsaw	22–25	25–19	25–23	25–23		97–90	

=== 17th round ===
Date	Time		Score		Set 1	Set 2	Set 3	Set 4	Set 5	Total	Report
30 Jan	20:30	Aluron Virtu Warta Zawiercie	3–1	Chemik Bydgoszcz	25–27	27–25	26–24	25–21		103–97	
2 Feb	17:30	Onico Warsaw	3–0	Cerrad Czarni Radom	25–21	25–19	25–16			75–56	
1 Feb	17:30	Cuprum Lubin	3–1	GKS Katowice	23–25	25–18	25–19	25–19		98–81	
3 Feb	17:30	Jastrzębski Węgiel	3–0	MKS Będzin	25–17	25–20	25–21			75–58	
2 Feb	14:45	Indykpol AZS Olsztyn	3–1	PGE Skra Bełchatów	20–25	36–34	25–21	25–15		106–95	
5 Mar	20:30	Trefl Gdańsk	3–1	ZAKSA Kędzierzyn-Koźle	26–24	25–20	23–25	25–21		99–90	

=== 18th round ===
Date	Time		Score		Set 1	Set 2	Set 3	Set 4	Set 5	Total	Report
3 Feb	14:45	Chemik Bydgoszcz	0–3	Trefl Gdańsk	17–25	24–26	21–25			62–76	
6 Feb	18:30	ZAKSA Kędzierzyn-Koźle	3–1	Indykpol AZS Olsztyn	25–18	33–35	25–20	25–22		108–95	
6 Feb	20:30	PGE Skra Bełchatów	1–3	Jastrzębski Węgiel	25–27	25–20	23–25	27–29		100–101	
5 Feb	20:30	MKS Będzin	1–3	Asseco Resovia	25–22	15–25	15–25	23–25		78–97	
6 Feb	17:30	GKS Katowice	1–3	Onico Warsaw	22–25	26–24	18–25	15–25		81–99	
7 Feb	20:30	Cerrad Czarni Radom	3–1	Aluron Virtu Warta Zawiercie	25–21	19–25	26–24	30–28		100–98	

=== 19th round ===
Date	Time		Score		Set 1	Set 2	Set 3	Set 4	Set 5	Total	Report
11 Feb	20:30	Cerrad Czarni Radom	3–1	Chemik Bydgoszcz	23–25	25–23	25–14	25–21		98–83	
16 Jan	20:30	GKS Katowice	3–0	Aluron Virtu Warta Zawiercie	25–20	25–19	27–25			77–64	
9 Feb	17:30	Cuprum Lubin	3–0	MKS Będzin	25–20	25–22	25–23			75–65	
10 Feb	14:45	Asseco Resovia	3–1	PGE Skra Bełchatów	23–25	25–17	25–23	25–22		98–87	
9 Feb	14:45	Jastrzębski Węgiel	0–3	ZAKSA Kędzierzyn-Koźle	20–25	19–25	20–25			59–75	
10 Feb	17:30	Indykpol AZS Olsztyn	2–3	Trefl Gdańsk	25–20	16–25	18–25	25–19	11–15	95–104	

=== 20th round ===
Date	Time		Score		Set 1	Set 2	Set 3	Set 4	Set 5	Total	Report
15 Feb	17:30	Chemik Bydgoszcz	3–1	Indykpol AZS Olsztyn	25–19	20–25	25–23	25–20		95–87	
17 Feb	14:45	Trefl Gdańsk	1–3	Jastrzębski Węgiel	20–25	25–19	22–25	26–28		93–97	
16 Feb	14:45	ZAKSA Kędzierzyn-Koźle	0–3	Asseco Resovia	17–25	21–25	21–25			59–75	
17 Feb	17:30	PGE Skra Bełchatów	3–1	Cuprum Lubin	25–20	21–25	25–21	25–19		96–85	
14 Feb	20:30	Onico Warsaw	3–0	MKS Będzin	25–22	25–20	25–22			75–64	
16 Feb	17:30	GKS Katowice	3–0	Cerrad Czarni Radom	25–15	25–17	31–29			81–61	

=== 21st round ===
Date	Time		Score		Set 1	Set 2	Set 3	Set 4	Set 5	Total	Report
20 Feb	18:30	GKS Katowice	3–1	Chemik Bydgoszcz	22–25	25–18	25–20	25–13		97–76	
20 Feb	18:00	Aluron Virtu Warta Zawiercie	3–1	MKS Będzin	25–22	25–20	22–25	27–25		99–92	
20 Feb	20:30	Onico Warsaw	2–3	PGE Skra Bełchatów	21–25	17–25	30–28	25–16	16–18	109–112	
20 Feb	18:00	Cuprum Lubin	0–3	ZAKSA Kędzierzyn-Koźle	18–25	22–25	22–25			62–75	
20 Feb	17:30	Asseco Resovia	3–1	Trefl Gdańsk	25–21	25–16	19–25	29–27		98–89	
20 Feb	18:00	Jastrzębski Węgiel	2–3	Indykpol AZS Olsztyn	31–33	25–21	27–25	22–25	13–15	118–119	

=== 22nd round ===
Date	Time		Score		Set 1	Set 2	Set 3	Set 4	Set 5	Total	Report
25 Feb	17:30	Chemik Bydgoszcz	0–3	Jastrzębski Węgiel	19–25	20–25	23–25			62–75	
24 Feb	17:30	Indykpol AZS Olsztyn	3–0	Asseco Resovia	25–22	25–22	25–18			75–62	
23 Feb	20:30	Trefl Gdańsk	3–0	Cuprum Lubin	25–20	25–17	25–21			75–58	
23 Feb	14:45	ZAKSA Kędzierzyn-Koźle	1–3	Onico Warsaw	17–25	25–23	21–25	23–25		86–98	
24 Feb	14:45	PGE Skra Bełchatów	3–2	Aluron Virtu Warta Zawiercie	15–25	23–25	25–23	25–16	15–13	103–102	
25 Feb	20:30	MKS Będzin	1–3	Cerrad Czarni Radom	25–23	12–25	28–30	19–25		84–103	

=== 23rd round ===
Date	Time		Score		Set 1	Set 2	Set 3	Set 4	Set 5	Total	Report
1 Mar	20:30	GKS Katowice	3–2	MKS Będzin	25–20	18–25	25–15	19–25	15–6	102–91	
2 Mar	14:45	Cerrad Czarni Radom	2–3	PGE Skra Bełchatów	25–20	25–21	20–25	21–25	10–15	101–106	
3 Mar	14:45	Aluron Virtu Warta Zawiercie	1–3	ZAKSA Kędzierzyn-Koźle	25–22	19–25	21–25	16–25		81–97	
2 Mar	17:30	Onico Warsaw	3–0	Trefl Gdańsk	25–19	25–17	25–18			75–54	
3 Mar	17:30	Cuprum Lubin	1–3	Indykpol AZS Olsztyn	25–19	22–25	20–25	21–25		88–94	
2 Mar	20:30	Asseco Resovia	3–0	Jastrzębski Węgiel	25–21	25–21	25–17			75–59	

=== 24th round ===
Date	Time		Score		Set 1	Set 2	Set 3	Set 4	Set 5	Total	Report
11 Mar	17:30	Chemik Bydgoszcz	1–3	Asseco Resovia	20–25	25–22	16–25	15–25		76–97	
7 Mar	17:30	Jastrzębski Węgiel	3–0	Cuprum Lubin	25–18	25–20	25–17			75–55	
8 Mar	20:30	Indykpol AZS Olsztyn	1–3	Onico Warsaw	19–25	21–25	25–20	18–25		83–95	
8 Mar	17:30	Trefl Gdańsk	1–3	Aluron Virtu Warta Zawiercie	17–25	25–21	26–28	23–25		91–99	
10 Mar	20:30	ZAKSA Kędzierzyn-Koźle	3–1	Cerrad Czarni Radom	25–21	23–25	25–23	25–23		98–92	
7 Mar	20:30	PGE Skra Bełchatów	3–1	GKS Katowice	25–20	23–25	25–23	25–15		98–83	

=== 25th round ===
Date	Time		Score		Set 1	Set 2	Set 3	Set 4	Set 5	Total	Report
15 Mar	20:30	MKS Będzin	1–3	Chemik Bydgoszcz	22–25	25–23	18–25	20–25		85–98	
16 Mar	14:45	GKS Katowice	1–3	ZAKSA Kędzierzyn-Koźle	26–24	18–25	18–25	22–25		84–99	
16 Mar	17:30	Cerrad Czarni Radom	3–0	Trefl Gdańsk	25–23	25–21	25–22			75–66	
17 Mar	14:45	Aluron Virtu Warta Zawiercie	3–0	Indykpol AZS Olsztyn	25–15	25–21	25–22			75–58	
17 Mar	20:30	Onico Warsaw	3–0	Jastrzębski Węgiel	27–25	25–15	25–21			77–61	
15 Mar	17:30	Cuprum Lubin	3–0	Asseco Resovia	25–22	25–22	28–26			78–70	

=== 26th round ===
Date	Time		Score		Set 1	Set 2	Set 3	Set 4	Set 5	Total	Report
20 Mar	20:30	Onico Warsaw	3–0	Chemik Bydgoszcz	25–13	25–22	25–20			75–55	
23 Mar	14:45	Cuprum Lubin	0–3	Aluron Virtu Warta Zawiercie	18–25	22–25	19–25			59–75	
19 Mar	20:30	Asseco Resovia	3–1	Cerrad Czarni Radom	25–22	18–25	25–21	25–20		93–88	
19 Mar	17:30	GKS Katowice	1–3	Jastrzębski Węgiel	21–25	18–25	28–26	18–25		85–101	
23 Mar	17:30	Trefl Gdańsk	2–3	MKS Będzin	25–18	25–21	23–25	32–34	11–15	116–113	
24 Mar	14:45	ZAKSA Kędzierzyn-Koźle	3–1	PGE Skra Bełchatów	25–23	38–36	19–25	25–23		107–107	

== Playoffs ==
=== Quarterfinals ===
- (to 2 victories)

==== Quarterfinal A ====
Date	Time		Score		Set 1	Set 2	Set 3	Set 4	Set 5	Total	Report
27 Mar	17:30	Jastrzębski Węgiel	3–2	PGE Skra Bełchatów	25–22	25–20	27–29	21–25	15–11	113–107	
30 Mar	14:45	PGE Skra Bełchatów	0–3	Jastrzębski Węgiel	20–25	15–25	21–25			56–75	

==== Quarterfinal B ====
Date	Time		Score		Set 1	Set 2	Set 3	Set 4	Set 5	Total	Report
27 Mar	20:30	Aluron Virtu Warta Zawiercie	3–2	Cerrad Czarni Radom	27–29	25–22	21–25	25–17	15–13	113–106	
31 Mar	14:45	Cerrad Czarni Radom	3–1	Aluron Virtu Warta Zawiercie	26–28	25–20	34–32	25–21		110–101	
7 Apr	17:30	Aluron Virtu Warta Zawiercie	3–0	Cerrad Czarni Radom	25–21	25–19	25–17			75–57	

=== Semifinals ===
- (to 2 victories)

==== Semifinal A ====
Date	Time		Score		Set 1	Set 2	Set 3	Set 4	Set 5	Total	Report
13 Apr	14:45	ZAKSA Kędzierzyn-Koźle	1–3	Aluron Virtu Warta Zawiercie	25–20	22–25	22–25	22–25		91–95	
17 Apr	17:30	Aluron Virtu Warta Zawiercie	2–3	ZAKSA Kędzierzyn-Koźle	25–16	25–23	19–25	18–25	12–15	99–104	
24 Apr	17:30	ZAKSA Kędzierzyn-Koźle	3–1	Aluron Virtu Warta Zawiercie	25–22	21–25	25–17	25–22		96–86	

==== Semifinal B ====
Date	Time		Score		Set 1	Set 2	Set 3	Set 4	Set 5	Total	Report
16 Apr	20:30	Onico Warsaw	1–3	Jastrzębski Węgiel	25–20	22–25	23–25	25–27		95–97	
19 Apr	17:30	Jastrzębski Węgiel	0–3	Onico Warsaw	19–25	23–25	21–25			63–75	
24 Apr	20:30	Onico Warsaw	3–2	Jastrzębski Węgiel	25–20	25–23	22–25	21–25	15–12	108–105	

=== Finals ===
- (to 3 victories)

Date	Time		Score		Set 1	Set 2	Set 3	Set 4	Set 5	Total	Report
27 Apr	14:45	ZAKSA Kędzierzyn-Koźle	3–2	Onico Warsaw	25–23	25–21	20–25	27–29	17–15	114–113	
1 May	20:30	Onico Warsaw	0–3	ZAKSA Kędzierzyn-Koźle	22–25	24–26	22–25			68–76	
4 May	17:30	ZAKSA Kędzierzyn-Koźle	3–1	Onico Warsaw	25–22	19–25	32–30	25–19		101–96	

== Placement matches ==
=== 11th place ===
- (to 2 victories)

Date	Time		Score		Set 1	Set 2	Set 3	Set 4	Set 5	Total	Report
31 Mar	17:30	Chemik Bydgoszcz	2–3	Cuprum Lubin	13–25	25–22	25–23	21–25	11–15	95–110	
5 Apr	18:00	Cuprum Lubin	3–1	Chemik Bydgoszcz	25–20	26–28	25–23	25–14		101–85	

=== 9th place ===
- (to 2 victories)

Date	Time		Score		Set 1	Set 2	Set 3	Set 4	Set 5	Total	Report
30 Mar	17:30	Indykpol AZS Olsztyn	0–3	Trefl Gdańsk	18–25	20–25	26–28			64–78	
5 Apr	17:30	Trefl Gdańsk	3–0	Indykpol AZS Olsztyn	25–22	25–23	25–23			75–68	

=== 7th place ===
- (to 2 victories)

Date	Time		Score		Set 1	Set 2	Set 3	Set 4	Set 5	Total	Report
1 Apr	20:30	Asseco Resovia	3–0	GKS Katowice	25–22	25–18	25–19			75–59	
6 Apr	20:30	GKS Katowice	0–3	Asseco Resovia	21–25	17–25	22–25			60–75	

=== 5th place ===
- (to 2 victories)

Date	Time		Score		Set 1	Set 2	Set 3	Set 4	Set 5	Total	Report
13 Apr	20:30	Cerrad Czarni Radom	3–2	PGE Skra Bełchatów	25–21	23–25	21–25	26–24	16–14	111–109	
16 Apr	17:30	PGE Skra Bełchatów	3–2	Cerrad Czarni Radom	23–25	25–22	25–17	27–29	15–13	115–106	
25 Apr	17:30	Cerrad Czarni Radom	3–0	PGE Skra Bełchatów	25–19	26–24	25–18			76–61	

=== 3rd place ===
- (to 3 victories)

Date	Time		Score		Set 1	Set 2	Set 3	Set 4	Set 5	Total	Report
27 April	17:30	Jastrzębski Węgiel	3–2	Aluron Virtu Warta Zawiercie	23–25	25–17	25–18	26–28	15–10	114–98	
1 May	17:30	Aluron Virtu Warta Zawiercie	2–3	Jastrzębski Węgiel	19–25	25–21	25–21	22–25	21–23	112–115	
4 May	14:45	Jastrzębski Węgiel	3–0	Aluron Virtu Warta Zawiercie	25–21	25–22	25–17			75–60	

== Final standings ==
Qualified for the 2019–20 CEV Champions League
Qualified for the 2019–20 CEV Challenge Cup

Rank	Team
1st place, gold medalist(s)	ZAKSA Kędzierzyn-Koźle
2nd place, silver medalist(s)	Onico Warsaw
3rd place, bronze medalist(s)	Jastrzębski Węgiel
4	Aluron Virtu Warta Zawiercie
5	Cerrad Czarni Radom
6	PGE Skra Bełchatów
7	Asseco Resovia
8	GKS Katowice
9	Trefl Gdańsk
10	Indykpol AZS Olsztyn
11	Cuprum Lubin
12	Chemik Bydgoszcz
13	MKS Będzin

2019 Polish champions
ZAKSA Kędzierzyn-Koźle
8th title

== Squads ==
Aluron Virtu Warta Zawiercie
No.	Name	Date of birth	Height	Position
1	(Poland) Marcin Waliński	24 October 1990	1.95 m (6 ft 5 in)	outside hitter
2	(Australia) Arshdeep Dosanjh	30 July 1996	2.05 m (6 ft 9 in)	setter
3	(Poland) Łukasz Swodczyk	1 June 1990	1.96 m (6 ft 5 in)	middle blocker
4	(Poland) Krzysztof Rejno	22 February 1993	2.03 m (6 ft 8 in)	middle blocker
5	(Poland) Michał Żuk	4 July 1985	1.96 m (6 ft 5 in)	outside hitter
6	(Poland) Mateusz Malinowski	6 May 1992	1.98 m (6 ft 6 in)	opposite
7	(Poland) Aleh Akhrem	12 March 1983	1.94 m (6 ft 4 in)	outside hitter
8	(Portugal) Alexandre Ferreira	13 November 1991	2.00 m (6 ft 7 in)	outside hitter
9	(Poland) Krzysztof Andrzejewski	26 January 1983	1.80 m (5 ft 11 in)	libero
10	(Poland) Bartosz Gawryszewski	22 August 1985	2.02 m (6 ft 8 in)	middle blocker
11	(Poland) Marcin Kania	14 February 1996	2.03 m (6 ft 8 in)	middle blocker
12	(Poland) Grzegorz Bociek	6 June 1991	2.07 m (6 ft 9 in)	opposite
13	(Poland) Kamil Semeniuk	16 July 1996	1.94 m (6 ft 4 in)	outside hitter
19	(Japan) Taichirō Koga	4 October 1989	1.70 m (5 ft 7 in)	libero
77	(Slovakia) Michal Masný	14 August 1979	1.82 m (6 ft 0 in)	setter
Head coach:		(Australia) Mark Lebedew		

Asseco Resovia
No.	Name	Date of birth	Height	Position
1	(Poland) Łukasz Kozub	3 November 1997	1.86 m (6 ft 1 in)	setter
2	(United States) Kawika Shoji	11 November 1987	1.90 m (6 ft 3 in)	setter
3	(Poland) Bartłomiej Lemański	19 March 1996	2.16 m (7 ft 1 in)	middle blocker
4	(Australia) Luke Perry	20 November 1995	1.80 m (5 ft 11 in)	libero
5	(France) Rafael Redwitz	12 August 1980	1.88 m (6 ft 2 in)	setter
7	(Poland) Jakub Jarosz	10 February 1987	1.97 m (6 ft 6 in)	opposite
8	(Poland) Damian Schulz	26 February 1990	2.08 m (6 ft 10 in)	opposite
9	(France) Thibault Rossard	28 August 1993	1.93 m (6 ft 4 in)	outside hitter
10	(France) Nicolas Szerszeń	31 December 1996	1.95 m (6 ft 5 in)	outside hitter
12	(Poland) Łukasz Perłowski	3 April 1984	2.04 m (6 ft 8 in)	middle blocker
13	(Poland) Mateusz Masłowski	13 June 1997	1.85 m (6 ft 1 in)	libero
14	(Poland) Rafał Buszek	28 April 1987	1.96 m (6 ft 5 in)	outside hitter
15	(Poland) Mateusz Mika	21 January 1991	2.06 m (6 ft 9 in)	outside hitter
17	(Poland) Marcin Możdżonek	9 February 1985	2.11 m (6 ft 11 in)	middle blocker
18	(Poland) Dawid Dryja	21 July 1992	2.01 m (6 ft 7 in)	middle blocker
20	(United States) David Smith	15 May 1985	2.01 m (6 ft 7 in)	middle blocker
Head coach:		(Poland) Andrzej Kowal → (Romania) Gheorghe Crețu		

Cerrad Czarni Radom
No.	Name	Date of birth	Height	Position
1	(Slovenia) Alen Pajenk	23 April 1986	2.03 m (6 ft 8 in)	middle blocker
2	(Poland) Michał Ostrowski	29 March 1990	2.03 m (6 ft 8 in)	middle blocker
3	(Switzerland) Reto Giger	5 August 1991	1.95 m (6 ft 5 in)	setter
6	(Poland) Wojciech Żaliński	8 January 1988	1.96 m (6 ft 5 in)	outside hitter
8	(Poland) Kacper Wasilewski	4 January 1998	1.91 m (6 ft 3 in)	libero
9	(Slovenia) Dejan Vinčić	15 September 1986	2.02 m (6 ft 8 in)	setter
10	(Poland) Michał Filip	31 August 1994	1.97 m (6 ft 6 in)	opposite
11	(Poland) Michał Ruciak	22 August 1983	1.90 m (6 ft 3 in)	libero
14	(Poland) Jakub Rybicki	1 November 1998	1.96 m (6 ft 5 in)	outside hitter
15	(Poland) Norbert Huber	14 August 1998	2.07 m (6 ft 9 in)	middle blocker
17	(Russia) Maksim Zhigalov	26 July 1989	2.01 m (6 ft 7 in)	opposite
19	(Poland) Tomasz Fornal	31 August 1997	2.00 m (6 ft 7 in)	outside hitter
20	(Poland) Kamil Kwasowski	13 September 1990	1.97 m (6 ft 6 in)	outside hitter
Head coach:		(Poland) Robert Prygiel		

Chemik Bydgoszcz
No.	Name	Date of birth	Height	Position
1	(Poland) Bartłomiej Lipiński	16 November 1996	2.01 m (6 ft 7 in)	outside hitter
2	(Brazil) Raphael Margarido	28 April 1983	1.86 m (6 ft 1 in)	setter
3	(Serbia) Nikola Kovačević	14 February 1983	1.91 m (6 ft 3 in)	outside hitter
6	(Poland) Paweł Gryc	9 January 1996	2.08 m (6 ft 10 in)	outside hitter
7	(Poland) Michał Szalacha	15 January 1994	2.02 m (6 ft 8 in)	middle blocker
8	(Poland) Mateusz Siwicki	23 July 1996	2.00 m (6 ft 7 in)	middle blocker
9	(Poland) Bartosz Filipiak	27 February 1994	1.97 m (6 ft 6 in)	opposite
10	(Poland) Adam Kowalski	16 September 1994	1.80 m (5 ft 11 in)	libero
11	(Poland) Patryk Akala	12 October 1988	2.01 m (6 ft 7 in)	middle blocker
12	(Poland) Jan Lesiuk	7 June 1996	1.90 m (6 ft 3 in)	outside hitter
13	(Poland) Piotr Sieńko	8 December 1993	1.96 m (6 ft 5 in)	setter
15	(Poland) Kacper Bobrowski	8 October 1997	1.90 m (6 ft 3 in)	libero
17	(Belarus) Maksim Marozau	29 May 1989	2.06 m (6 ft 9 in)	middle blocker
18	(Poland) Marcin Karakuła	23 December 1998	1.91 m (6 ft 3 in)	setter
19	(Poland) Paweł Cieślik	18 March 2000	1.97 m (6 ft 6 in)	setter
20	(Poland) Mateusz Witek	22 May 1999	2.03 m (6 ft 8 in)	opposite
Head coach:		(Poland) Jakub Bednaruk		

Cuprum Lubin
No.	Name	Date of birth	Height	Position
2	(Poland) Mariusz Marcyniak	5 March 1992	2.06 m (6 ft 9 in)	middle blocker
5	(Estonia) Kert Toobal	3 June 1979	1.89 m (6 ft 2 in)	setter
6	(Poland) Damian Boruch	14 December 1989	2.09 m (6 ft 10 in)	middle blocker
7	(Poland) Maciej Gorzkiewicz	16 February 1984	1.92 m (6 ft 4 in)	setter
8	(Poland) Adrian Patucha	25 June 1983	1.96 m (6 ft 5 in)	opposite
9	(Belgium) Igor Grobelny	8 June 1993	1.94 m (6 ft 4 in)	outside hitter
10	(Poland) Jakub Wachnik	16 February 1993	2.02 m (6 ft 8 in)	outside hitter
11	(Poland) Filip Biegun	21 May 1996	2.00 m (6 ft 7 in)	outside hitter
12	(Poland) Przemysław Smoliński	27 November 1992	2.01 m (6 ft 7 in)	middle blocker
13	(Poland) Jędrzej Gruszczyński	13 November 1997	1.86 m (6 ft 1 in)	libero
14	(Australia) Luke Smith	30 August 1990	2.04 m (6 ft 8 in)	outside hitter
15	(Japan) Masahiro Yanagida	6 July 1992	1.87 m (6 ft 2 in)	outside hitter
16	(Poland) Bartosz Makoś	1 August 1998	1.76 m (5 ft 9 in)	libero
17	(Poland) Bartłomiej Zawalski	13 February 1999	2.04 m (6 ft 8 in)	middle blocker
23	(Poland) Jakub Ziobrowski	23 January 1997	2.02 m (6 ft 8 in)	opposite
Head coach:		(Brazil) Marcelo Fronckowiak		

GKS Katowice
No.	Name	Date of birth	Height	Position
1	(Poland) Bartłomiej Krulicki	15 September 1993	2.05 m (6 ft 9 in)	middle blocker
2	(Poland) Karol Butryn	18 June 1993	1.94 m (6 ft 4 in)	opposite
3	(Poland) Dawid Woch	16 May 1997	2.00 m (6 ft 7 in)	middle blocker
4	(Poland) Marcin Komenda	24 May 1996	1.98 m (6 ft 6 in)	setter
6	(Poland) Dominik Depowski	27 October 1995	2.00 m (6 ft 7 in)	outside hitter
7	(Belgium) Tomas Rousseaux	31 March 1994	1.99 m (6 ft 6 in)	outside hitter
9	(Argentina) Gonzalo Quiroga	25 February 1993	1.92 m (6 ft 4 in)	outside hitter
10	(Poland) Maciej Fijałek	7 August 1982	1.86 m (6 ft 1 in)	setter
11	(Poland) Wojciech Sobala	12 May 1988	2.07 m (6 ft 9 in)	middle blocker
12	(Slovakia) Emanuel Kohút	21 July 1982	2.04 m (6 ft 8 in)	middle blocker
14	(Poland) Bartosz Mariański	26 May 1992	1.87 m (6 ft 2 in)	libero
16	(Poland) Rafał Sobański	10 August 1991	1.95 m (6 ft 5 in)	outside hitter
17	(Poland) Bartosz Krzysiek	19 February 1990	2.07 m (6 ft 9 in)	opposite
18	(Poland) Dawid Ogórek	30 July 1990	1.84 m (6 ft 0 in)	libero
Head coach:		(Poland) Piotr Gruszka		

Indykpol AZS Olsztyn
No.	Name	Date of birth	Height	Position
1	(Poland) Mateusz Kańczok	3 June 1993	2.04 m (6 ft 8 in)	opposite
2	(Czech Republic) Jan Hadrava	3 June 1991	1.98 m (6 ft 6 in)	opposite
3	(Poland) Michał Żurek	3 June 1988	1.81 m (5 ft 11 in)	libero
4	(Slovakia) Marcel Lux	27 July 1994	2.00 m (6 ft 7 in)	outside hitter
5	(Poland) Miłosz Zniszczoł	2 July 1986	2.01 m (6 ft 7 in)	middle blocker
6	(Netherlands) Robbert Andringa	28 April 1990	1.91 m (6 ft 3 in)	outside hitter
7	(Ukraine) Serhiy Kapelus	22 October 1982	1.91 m (6 ft 3 in)	outside hitter
9	(Poland) Paweł Pietraszko	5 October 1990	2.03 m (6 ft 8 in)	middle blocker
10	(Poland) Radosław Gil	25 January 1997	1.91 m (6 ft 3 in)	setter
12	(Poland) Paweł Woicki	19 June 1983	1.82 m (6 ft 0 in)	setter
13	(Poland) Sebastian Warda	18 January 1989	2.04 m (6 ft 8 in)	middle blocker
14	(Poland) Jakub Urbanowicz	14 August 1993	2.03 m (6 ft 8 in)	outside hitter
16	(Poland) Mateusz Poręba	24 August 1999	2.04 m (6 ft 8 in)	middle blocker
17	(Poland) Jakub Zabłocki	10 April 1995	1.80 m (5 ft 11 in)	libero
Head coach:		(Italy) Roberto Santilli → (Poland) Michał Mieszko Gogol		

Jastrzębski Węgiel
No.	Name	Date of birth	Height	Position
1	(Germany) Christian Fromm	16 August 1990	2.04 m (6 ft 8 in)	outside hitter
3	(Poland) Jakub Popiwczak	17 April 1996	1.80 m (5 ft 11 in)	libero
4	(Poland) Grzegorz Kosok	2 March 1986	2.05 m (6 ft 9 in)	middle blocker
5	(Poland) Jakub Bucki	13 August 1988	1.97 m (6 ft 6 in)	opposite
6	(Poland) Dawid Konarski	31 August 1989	1.98 m (6 ft 6 in)	opposite
7	(Poland) Paweł Rusek	21 January 1983	1.83 m (6 ft 0 in)	libero
8	(France) Julien Lyneel	15 April 1990	1.92 m (6 ft 4 in)	outside hitter
9	(Poland) Dawid Gunia	1 January 1987	2.03 m (6 ft 8 in)	middle blocker
10	(Germany) Lukas Kampa	29 November 1986	1.93 m (6 ft 4 in)	setter
11	(Poland) Jakub Turski	6 September 1998	2.02 m (6 ft 8 in)	middle blocker
13	(Cuba) Salvador Hidalgo Oliva	27 December 1985	1.95 m (6 ft 5 in)	outside hitter
15	(Poland) Nikodem Wolański	19 January 1994	1.98 m (6 ft 6 in)	setter
16	(Poland) Potr Hain	26 February 1994	2.07 m (6 ft 9 in)	middle blocker
18	(Poland) Michał Szalacha	15 January 1994	2.02 m (6 ft 8 in)	middle blocker
55	(Poland) Wojciech Ferens	5 April 1991	1.94 m (6 ft 4 in)	outside hitter
Head coach:		(Italy) Ferdinando De Giorgi → (Italy) Roberto Santilli		

MKS Będzin
No.	Name	Date of birth	Height	Position
1	(Poland) Tomasz Kowalski	12 June 1991	2.02 m (6 ft 8 in)	setter
5	(Poland) Artur Ratajczak	18 September 1990	2.06 m (6 ft 9 in)	middle blocker
7	(Poland) Mateusz Kowalski	20 February 1997	2.05 m (6 ft 9 in)	middle blocker
9	(Poland) Michał Kocyłowski	19 February 1991	1.86 m (6 ft 1 in)	outside hitter
10	(Poland) Bartłomiej Grzechnik	8 February 1993	2.00 m (6 ft 7 in)	middle blocker
12	(Poland) Jan Fornal	14 January 1995	1.91 m (6 ft 3 in)	outside hitter
13	(Poland) Michał Potera	6 March 1988	1.83 m (6 ft 0 in)	libero
14	(Poland) Jakub Peszko	1 April 1992	1.93 m (6 ft 4 in)	outside hitter
16	(Poland) Rafał Faryna	28 September 1994	2.00 m (6 ft 7 in)	opposite
17	(Poland) Szymon Gregorowicz	7 March 1994	1.83 m (6 ft 0 in)	libero
18	(United States) Jake Langlois	14 May 1992	2.08 m (6 ft 10 in)	outside hitter
20	(Australia) Lincoln Williams	6 October 1993	2.00 m (6 ft 7 in)	opposite
23	(Poland) Adrian Buchowski	30 September 1991	1.94 m (6 ft 4 in)	outside hitter
37	(Czech Republic) Lukáš Ticháček	12 January 1982	1.93 m (6 ft 4 in)	setter
Head coach:		(Netherlands) Gido Vermeulen → (Poland) Emil Siewiorek		

Onico Warsaw
No.	Name	Date of birth	Height	Position
1	(Poland) Jakub Kowalczyk	26 June 1986	2.00 m (6 ft 7 in)	middle blocker
2	(Poland) Bartosz Kwolek	17 July 1997	1.93 m (6 ft 4 in)	outside hitter
3	(Poland) Konrad Buczek	17 February 1994	1.90 m (6 ft 3 in)	setter
4	(Poland) Maciej Muzaj	21 May 1994	2.08 m (6 ft 10 in)	opposite
6	(France) Antoine Brizard	22 May 1994	1.95 m (6 ft 5 in)	setter
7	(Poland) Piotr Łukasik	11 July 1994	2.08 m (6 ft 10 in)	outside hitter
8	(Poland) Andrzej Wrona	27 December 1988	2.06 m (6 ft 9 in)	middle blocker
9	(Poland) Łukasz Wiese	24 March 1993	1.95 m (6 ft 5 in)	outside hitter
11	(Canada) Graham Vigrass	17 June 1989	2.05 m (6 ft 9 in)	middle blocker
12	(Poland) Bartosz Kurek	29 August 1988	2.05 m (6 ft 9 in)	opposite
13	(Canada) Sharone Vernon-Evans	28 August 1998	2.02 m (6 ft 8 in)	opposite
14	(Poland) Dominik Jaglarski	20 June 1997	1.87 m (6 ft 2 in)	libero
16	(Argentina) Bruno Romanutti	5 July 1989	1.94 m (6 ft 4 in)	opposite
17	(Poland) Mateusz Janikowski	5 May 1999	2.01 m (6 ft 7 in)	outside hitter
18	(Poland) Damian Wojtaszek	7 September 1988	1.80 m (5 ft 11 in)	libero
19	(Poland) Jan Nowakowski	17 May 1994	2.02 m (6 ft 8 in)	middle blocker
20	(Brazil) Rafael Araújo	13 June 1991	2.07 m (6 ft 9 in)	opposite
22	(Bulgaria) Nikolay Penchev	22 May 1992	1.96 m (6 ft 5 in)	outside hitter
Head coach:		(France) Stéphane Antiga		

PGE Skra Bełchatów
No.	Name	Date of birth	Height	Position
1	(Poland) Kamil Droszyński	28 January 1997	1.90 m (6 ft 3 in)	setter
2	(Poland) Mariusz Wlazły	4 August 1983	1.94 m (6 ft 4 in)	opposite
3	(Estonia) Renee Teppan	16 September 1993	1.97 m (6 ft 6 in)	opposite
4	(Poland) Hubert Węgrzyn	6 January 2000	2.00 m (6 ft 7 in)	middle blocker
5	(Poland) Dawid Filipek	21 February 2001	1.90 m (6 ft 3 in)	setter
6	(Poland) Karol Kłos	8 August 1989	2.01 m (6 ft 7 in)	middle blocker
7	(Poland) Jakub Kochanowski	17 July 1997	1.99 m (6 ft 6 in)	middle blocker
8	(Serbia) Milan Katić	22 October 1993	2.01 m (6 ft 7 in)	outside hitter
9	(Poland) Patryk Czarnowski	1 November 1985	2.04 m (6 ft 8 in)	middle blocker
10	(Poland) Robert Milczarek	28 November 1983	1.88 m (6 ft 2 in)	libero
11	(Iran) Milad Ebadipour	17 October 1993	1.96 m (6 ft 5 in)	outside hitter
12	(Poland) Artur Szalpuk	20 March 1995	2.01 m (6 ft 7 in)	outside hitter
13	(Poland) Aleksander Antosiewicz	13 February 2001	2.05 m (6 ft 9 in)	middle blocker
14	(Cuba) David Fiel	28 August 1993	2.04 m (6 ft 8 in)	middle blocker
15	(Poland) Grzegorz Łomacz	1 October 1987	1.88 m (6 ft 2 in)	setter
16	(Poland) Kacper Piechocki	17 December 1995	1.85 m (6 ft 1 in)	libero
17	(Poland) Piotr Orczyk	19 March 1993	1.98 m (6 ft 6 in)	outside hitter
Head coach:		(Italy) Roberto Piazza		

Trefl Gdańsk
No.	Name	Date of birth	Height	Position
1	(Poland) Piotr Nowakowski	18 December 1987	2.05 m (6 ft 9 in)	middle blocker
2	(Poland) Wojciech Grzyb	4 January 1981	2.05 m (6 ft 9 in)	middle blocker
5	(Poland) Marcin Janusz	31 July 1994	1.95 m (6 ft 5 in)	setter
6	(Poland) Szymon Jakubiszak	13 February 1998	2.08 m (6 ft 10 in)	outside hitter
7	(Poland) Miłosz Hebda	11 March 1991	2.06 m (6 ft 9 in)	outside hitter
9	(Poland) Patryk Niemiec	18 February 1997	2.02 m (6 ft 8 in)	middle blocker
10	(Serbia) Nikola Mijailović	8 August 1989	1.91 m (6 ft 3 in)	outside hitter
12	(Poland) Maciej Muzaj	21 May 1994	2.08 m (6 ft 10 in)	opposite
13	(Germany) Ruben Schott	8 July 1994	1.92 m (6 ft 4 in)	outside hitter
14	(Poland) Maciej Olenderek	16 October 1992	1.78 m (5 ft 10 in)	libero
16	(Poland) Fabian Majcherski	28 March 1997	0 cm (0 in)	libero
17	(Poland) Bartłomiej Mordyl	21 January 1995	2.01 m (6 ft 7 in)	middle blocker
18	(Poland) Michał Kozłowski	16 February 1985	1.91 m (6 ft 3 in)	setter
20	(Poland) Kewin Sasak	20 February 1997	2.08 m (6 ft 10 in)	opposite
Head coach:		(Italy) Andrea Anastasi		

ZAKSA Kędzierzyn-Koźle
No.	Name	Date of birth	Height	Position
1	(Poland) Paweł Zatorski	21 June 1990	1.84 m (6 ft 0 in)	libero
2	(Poland) Łukasz Kaczmarek	29 June 1994	2.04 m (6 ft 8 in)	opposite
4	(Poland) Przemysław Stępień	7 February 1994	1.85 m (6 ft 1 in)	setter
5	(United States) James Shaw	5 March 1994	2.03 m (6 ft 8 in)	opposite
6	(France) Benjamin Toniutti	30 October 1989	1.83 m (6 ft 0 in)	setter
8	(Poland) Sławomir Jungiewicz	21 June 1989	1.96 m (6 ft 5 in)	opposite
9	(Poland) Łukasz Wiśniewski	3 February 1989	1.98 m (6 ft 6 in)	middle blocker
10	(Poland) Mateusz Bieniek	5 April 1994	2.08 m (6 ft 10 in)	middle blocker
11	(Poland) Aleksander Śliwka	24 May 1995	1.98 m (6 ft 6 in)	outside hitter
12	(Canada) Brandon Koppers	9 September 1995	2.02 m (6 ft 8 in)	outside hitter
13	(Poland) Rafał Szymura	29 August 1995	1.97 m (6 ft 6 in)	outside hitter
15	(Belgium) Sam Deroo	24 April 1992	2.03 m (6 ft 8 in)	outside hitter
16	(Poland) Tomasz Kalembka	30 June 1991	2.05 m (6 ft 9 in)	middle blocker
17	(Poland) Mateusz Sacharewicz	23 October 1989	1.98 m (6 ft 6 in)	middle blocker
20	(Poland) Kamil Szymura	24 January 1999	1.85 m (6 ft 1 in)	libero
Head coach:		(Italy) Andrea Gardini		

== See also ==
- 2018–19 CEV Champions League
- 2018–19 CEV Cup
