= Jastrzębski Węgiel =

Polish volleyball club

- Full name: Klub Sportowy Jastrzębski Węgiel Spółka Akcyjna
- Short name: JW
- Nickname: Jastrzębie, Jastrzębianie
- Founded: 1961; 65 years ago
- Ground: HWS (Capacity: 3,112)
- Chairman: Adam Gorol
- League: PlusLiga
- 2025–26: 7th place
- Website: Club home page

Uniforms
| Home | Away |

Jastrzębski Węgiel is a professional men's volleyball club based in Jastrzębie-Zdrój in southern Poland, founded in 1961. They used to compete in the Polish PlusLiga. Since its foundation the club is closely linked to coal mining in the region.

The club withdrew from PlusLiga from the 2026–27 season onwards due to financial issues regarding the withdrawal of its main sponsor.

== Honours ==
=== Domestic ===
- Polish Championship

Winners (4): 2003–04, 2020–21, 2022–23, 2023–24

- Polish Cup

Winners (2): 2009–10, 2024–25

- Polish SuperCup

Winners (2): 2021–22, 2022–23

=== International ===
- CEV Champions League

Silver (2): 2022–23, 2023–24
Semifinalists (1): 2021–22
Final Four (3): 2010–11, 2013–14, 2024–25

- FIVB Club World Championship

Silver (1): 2011

- CEV Challenge Cup

Silver (1): 2008–09

== Club history ==
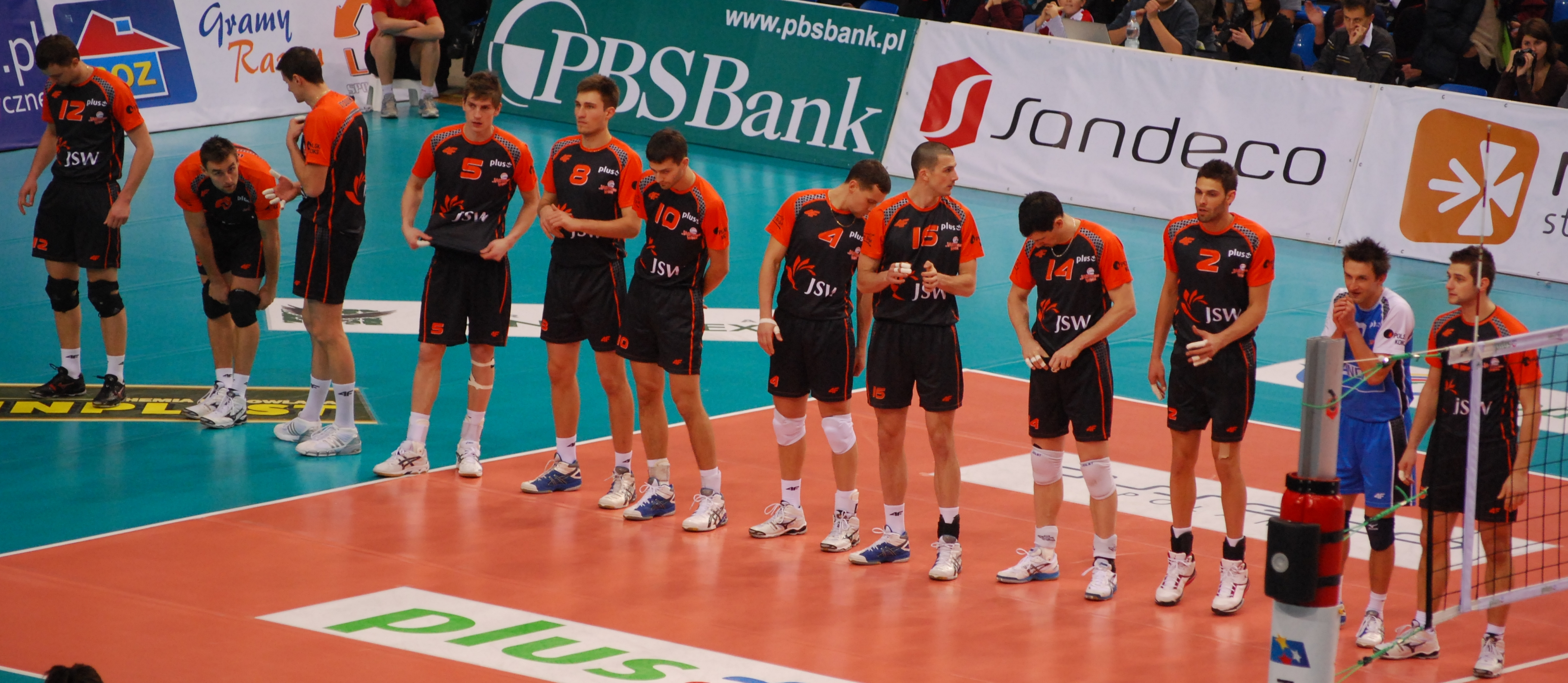
Jastrzębski Węgiel before a match of PlusLiga in 2010.

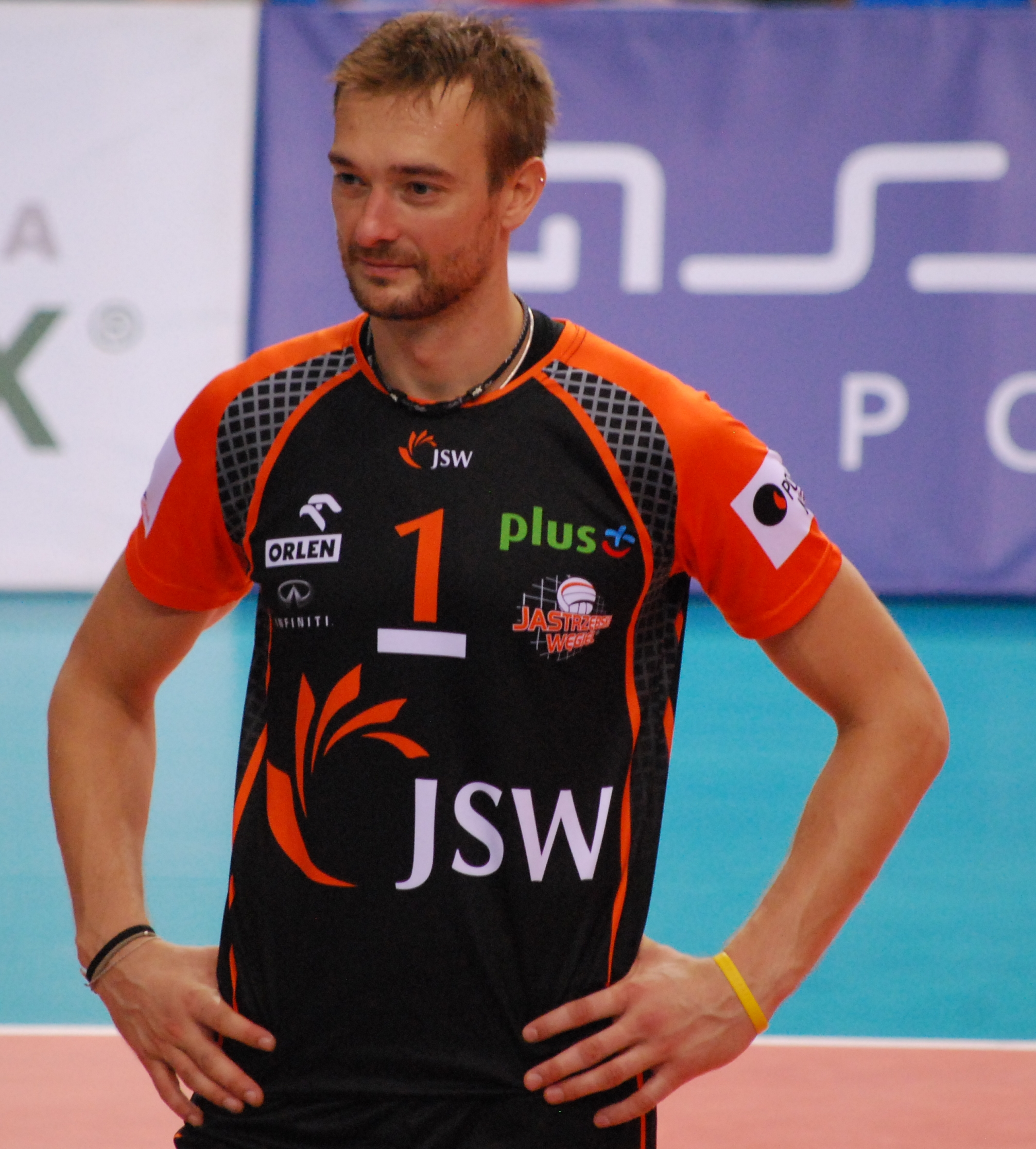
Captain of the team from 2013 to 2015, Michał Łasko.

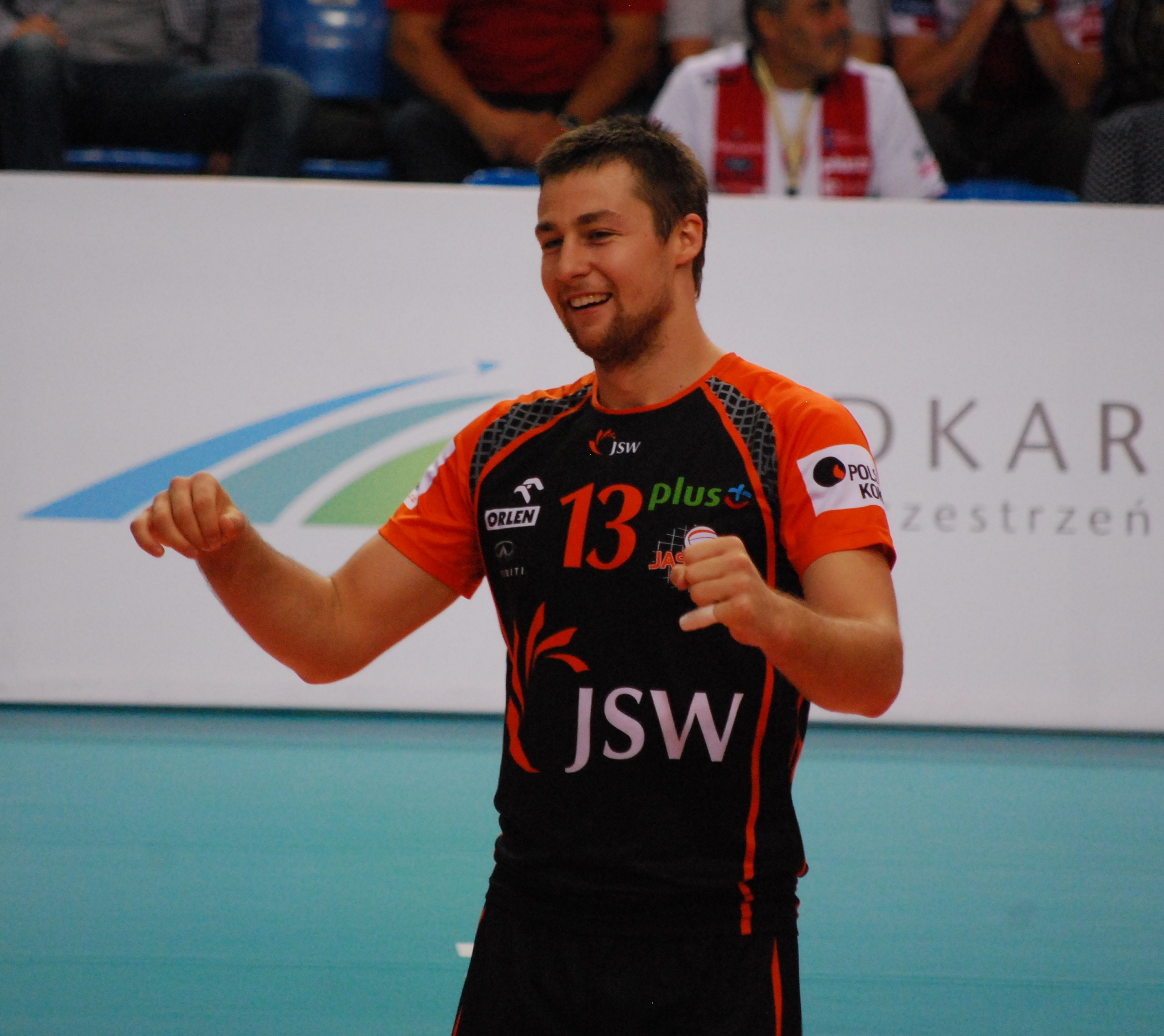
Receiver of Jastrzębski Węgiel from 2011 to 2014, Michał Kubiak.

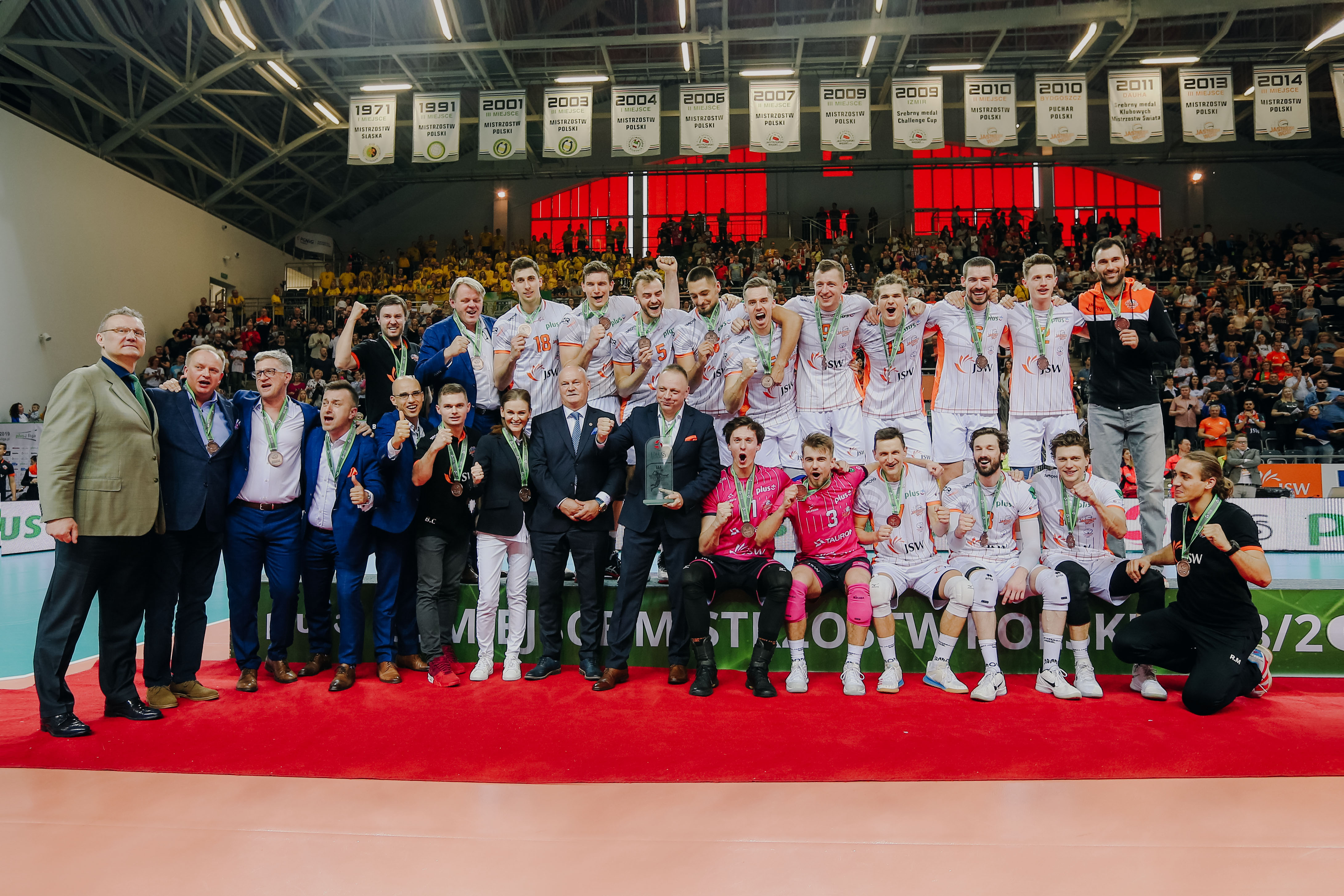
Jastrzębski Węgiel 2018/2019

The history of volleyball in Jastrzębie-Zdrój dates back to 1949 when a group of young boys from the local schools gathered by a sports executive Jan Maciejewski formed a club under the name LZS Jastrzębie. In 1961 the club ceased to exist and in the same year due to the population increase, caused by the beginning of coal mining in the region, was founded a club named Górnik Jastrzębie, later in 1963 renamed to Górnik JAS–MOS. The club consisted of 4 departments: boxing, volleyball, football and ice hockey.

In 1970, the club changed its name to GKS Jastrzębie and under this name the team led by Jerzy Tomczyk in 1979 won a historical promotion to the 2nd Polish Volleyball League. In 1983, Leszek Dejewski joined the team, still to this day associated with the club, currently as an assistant coach. In 1989, GKS Jastrzębie led by Waldemar Kuczewski for the first time in club's history was promoted to the 1st Polish Volleyball League, and in the next year in the upper league ended the season in 4th place.

Just before the 1990–91 season, GKS Jastrzębie table tennis, ice hockey and volleyball departments seceded from the club with the volleyball department taking over the Jastrzębie Borynia name. During the 1990s acting as Jastrzębie Borynia the team took part in the 1990–91 CEV Cup (former CEV Challenge Cup), reaching the second round and eventually losing to Belgian team Debic Zonhoven (3–2, 0–3). In the same season, the team led by Bronisław Orlikowski achieved its first medal of the Polish Championship, beating Płomień Milowice in four matches (3–1) for third place. Unfortunately, the next season did not end well with Jastrzębie being eliminated from the European Cups in the early stage of the competition. In the domestic league, Jastrzębie ended the season in 6th place. In 1993, the club was relegated from the 1st Polish Volleyball League and had to wait until 1997 when the team led by Zdzisław Grodecki for the second time in club's history was promoted to the 1st Polish Volleyball League (official name since 2008: PlusLiga), playing there until this day. In 1999, Jan Such became the head coach of Jastrzębie Borynia. With him on the bench, the club achieved its 2nd bronze medal in 2001, exactly on the tenth anniversary of achieving the first one in 1991, defeating Czarni Radom.

In 2002, the club changed its name to Ivett Jastrzębie Borynia.

Jan Such remained as the club head coach until 2003. He ended his work with the club, winning 3rd bronze medal. He has been replaced by a Slovak expert Igor Prieložný.

With Igor Prieložný as the Ivett Jastrzębie Borynia head coach, the club reached the CEV Challenge Cup quarterfinals, losing there with Serbian club Vojvodina Novi Sad (0–3, 0–3) while in the domestic league Jastrzębie achieved its first Polish Championship, winning with AZS Olsztyn in three matches (3–0).

In 2004, the club has been taken over by the coal mining company JSW, what resulted in the club's new name – Jastrzębski Węgiel.

During the 2004/05 season Jastrzębski Węgiel competed in the CEV Champions League where the club reached the Playoff 12 stage and eventually lost to Belgian club Noliko Maaseik (0–3, 1–3). The 2004–05 PlusLiga season, Jastrzębski Węgiel ended in 4th place. The 2005–06 PlusLiga season, Jastrzębski Węgiel spent playing in the CEV Challenge Cup and despite winning the first match with Russian club Iskra Odintsovo (3–2) in the 1/8 stage, Jastrzębski Węgiel lost the second match (0–3) and has been eliminated from the further competition. At the end of 2005, Igor Prieložný was dismissed as the club head coach and has been replaced by Ryszard Bosek. The team led by him made it to the final of the Polish Championship but had to credit the superiority of BOT Skra Bełchatów, and eventually was awarded with the first ever silver medals won by the club. In the next PlusLiga season, Jastrzębski Węgiel participated in the CEV Challenge Cup, losing in the quarterfinals to Italian club Copra Berni Piacenza (1–3, 3–2). Ryszard Bosek has decided to resign his post a month after that defeat and has been replaced by an Italian coach Tomaso Totolo who led the club to its 2nd silver medal, again losing in the final of the Polish Championship to BOT Skra Bełchatów. After the season, Tomaso Totolo decided to leave the club and has been replaced by his compatriot – Roberto Santilli.

Roberto Santilli led the team until 2010. During his work with the club, Jastrzębski Węgiel managed to reach the final of the 2008–09 CEV Challenge Cup held in İzmir. Jastrzębski Węgiel lost in the final to Turkish club Arkas İzmir (2–3) and achieved silver medals. In 2010, the team led by him not only ended the season in 2nd place but also for the first time in club's history won the Polish Cup, beating Asseco Resovia in the final (3–2). In 2010, Roberto Santilli left the club from Jastrzębie-Zdrój. Igor Prieložný again became the head coach of the club but only remained as such until December 2010 when he has been replaced by one of the best players of the 20th century – Lorenzo Bernardi. The 2010–11 PlusLiga season, the club ended in 2nd place, losing in the final to PGE Skra Bełchatów in three matches (1–3).

With Lorenzo Bernardi as a head coach, the club for the first time in its history advanced to the Final Four of the CEV Champions League in 2011, and achieved a silver medal of the 2011 FIVB Club World Championship. In the 2012/2013 season Jastrzębski Węgiel won a bronze medal of the Polish Championship. In 2014, the club for the second time in its history advanced to the Final Four of the CEV Champions League held in Ankara, Turkey and after defeating Zenit Kazan won a bronze medal. The club, ended the 2013–14 PlusLiga season with another bronze of the Polish Championship. After the season, Lorenzo Bernardi and one of the club main players Michał Kubiak left the team. An Italian coach Roberto Piazza, became the successor of Lorenzo Bernardi.

The team led by Piazza took 4th place of the Polish Championship and has been eliminated in the Playoff 12 stage of the 2014–15 CEV Champions League by Italian club Sir Safety Perugia (2–3, 0–3). Piazza left the club after that season and has been replaced by an Australian coach Mark Lebedew. Except for the coach, a few significant players left the club: previous captain and opposite Michał Łasko, opposite Mateusz Malinowski and outside hitter Zbigniew Bartman. It was all caused by the financial crisis in the mining industry, the branch closely related to the club's main sponsor – JSW.

Mark Lebedew remained as the Jastrzębski Węgiel head coach for 3 seasons, during his work the club achieved its 7th bronze medal of the Polish Championship after 2 matches for 3rd place against Asseco Resovia (3–1, 3–2). As a result, Jastrzębski Węgiel once again gained the right to compete in the upcoming CEV Champions League season. On 12 January 2018, the club informed about dismissing Mark Lebedew. The dismissal of the head coach took place two days after losing the quarterfinals of the 2017–18 Polish Cup to Onico Warsaw (2–3). His duties were taken over by his assistant Leszek Dejewski and the next official head coach Ferdinando De Giorgi took over the team on 12 January 2018. De Giorgi was a head coach of the Polish national team from 2016 to 2017, and prior to that – of ZAKSA Kędzierzyn-Koźle.

The 2017–18 PlusLiga season Jastrzębski Węgiel finished in 5th place. Before the 2018–19 PlusLiga season, a few notable players reinforced the squad: two–time World Champion Dawid Konarski and two national team members: Julien Lyneel and Christian Fromm. In the middle of December, De Giorgi decided to break an agreement with the club, after receiving an offer from Italian club Cucine Lube Civitanova. On 16 December 2018, Roberto Santilli was announced as the new head coach. Santilli was already coaching Jastrzębski Węgiel from 2007 to 2010, and returned to the club from Jastrzębie-Zdrój after 8 years.

Santilli led the club to its 8th bronze medal of the Polish Championship after defeating Aluron Virtu Warta Zawiercie in 3 matches (3–2, 3–2, 3–0). Thanks to that, Jastrzębski Węgiel returned to the CEV Champions League after a one–year break. A month after the beginning of the 2019–20 PlusLiga season, the club management decided to dismiss Roberto Santilli due to "the unsatisfactory team performance and lack of expected results". Slobodan Kovač was announced as the new head coach on 1 December 2019.

The team from Jastrzębie-Zdrój finished 1st in its 2019–20 CEV Champions League group, defeated Russian team Zenit Kazan two times and ultimately reached the quarterfinals. During the away game against Zenit Kazan, Jastrzębski Węgiel managed to come back from 9–14 in the 5th set, and defeated the six–time CEV Champions League winners 16–14. Unfortunately, the team did not have a chance to play the quarterfinals against Italian team Itas Trentino due to the COVID-19 pandemic. In the domestic league, Jastrzębski Węgiel ended the season in 4th place, after having played 24 out of 26 games of the 2019–20 PlusLiga regular season. As a result of CEV decision, the club was granted a place in the qualification stage of the next CEV Champions League edition, despite not being entitled to start in the competition. On 31 May 2020, the club management informed about not extending the contract with 8 players and the head coach Slobodan Kovač. An Australian coach Luke Reynolds, so far acting as an assistant coach of Jastrzębski Węgiel was announced as the new head coach on 3 June 2020.

== Team ==
As of 2025–26 season

| No. | Name | Date of birth | Position |
|---|---|---|---|
| 2 | (Poland) Łukasz Kaczmarek | 29 June 1994 (age 32) | opposite |
| 6 | (France) Benjamin Toniutti | 30 October 1989 (age 36) | setter |
| 7 | (Poland) Adam Lorenc | 30 October 1998 (age 27) | opposite |
| 8 | (Poland) Adrian Staszewski | 31 May 1990 (age 36) | outside hitter |
| 9 | (Poland) Nicolas Szerszeń | 31 December 1996 (age 29) | outside hitter |
| 11 | (Serbia) Miran Kujundžić | 19 June 1997 (age 29) | outside hitter |
| 12 | (Germany) Anton Brehme | 10 August 1999 (age 27) | middle blocker |
| 17 | (Poland) Jakub Jurczyk | 17 February 2006 (age 20) | libero |
| 18 | (Poland) Maksymilian Granieczny | 7 July 2005 (age 21) | libero |
| 19 | (Poland) Mateusz Kufka | 8 November 2003 (age 22) | middle blocker |
| 23 | (Poland) Jordan Zaleszczyk | 23 April 2002 (age 24) | middle blocker |
| 27 | (Poland) Michał Gierżot | 4 October 2001 (age 24) | outside hitter |
| 33 | (Poland) Łukasz Usowicz | 13 August 1997 (age 29) | middle blocker |
| 91 | (United States) Joshua Tuaniga | 18 March 1997 (age 29) | setter |
| Head coach: | | (Poland) Andrzej Kowal | |

== Season by season ==
| Season | Tier | League | Pos. |
|---|---|---|---|
| 2008–09 | 1 | PlusLiga | 3 |
| 2009–10 | 1 | PlusLiga | 2 |
| 2010–11 | 1 | PlusLiga | 7 |
| 2011–12 | 1 | PlusLiga | 4 |
| 2012–13 | 1 | PlusLiga | 3 |
| 2013–14 | 1 | PlusLiga | 3 |
| 2014–15 | 1 | PlusLiga | 4 |
| 2015–16 | 1 | PlusLiga | 7 |
| 2016–17 | 1 | PlusLiga | 3 |

| Season | Tier | League | Pos. |
|---|---|---|---|
| 2017–18 | 1 | PlusLiga | 5 |
| 2018–19 | 1 | PlusLiga | 3 |
| 2019–20 | 1 | PlusLiga | 4 |
| 2020–21 | 1 | PlusLiga | 1st place, gold medalist(s) |
| 2021–22 | 1 | PlusLiga | 2 |
| 2022–23 | 1 | PlusLiga | 1st place, gold medalist(s) |
| 2023–24 | 1 | PlusLiga | 1st place, gold medalist(s) |
| 2024–25 | 1 | PlusLiga | 4 |
| 2025–26 | 1 | PlusLiga | 7 |

== Former names ==
| Years | Name |
|---|---|
| 1961–1963 | Górnik Jastrzębie |
| 1963–1970 | Górnik JAS–MOS |
| 1970–1990 | GKS Jastrzębie |
| 1990–2001 | Jastrzębie Borynia |
| 2001–2004 | Ivett Jastrzębie Borynia |
| 2004–present | Jastrzębski Węgiel |

== Youth Academy ==
Akademia Talentów Jastrzębskiego Węgla (Jastrzębski Węgiel Talent Academy) – is an academy under the patronage of Jastrzębski Węgiel and JSW, founded in 2012, focused on training and development of the youth in the skills needed to play professional volleyball. The academy gathers many talented young people from all over the country, being one of the strongest training centres in Poland.

== See also ==
- Jastrzębski Węgiel players
- Jastrzębski Węgiel coaches
