= Maciej Muzaj =

Polish volleyball player (born 1994)

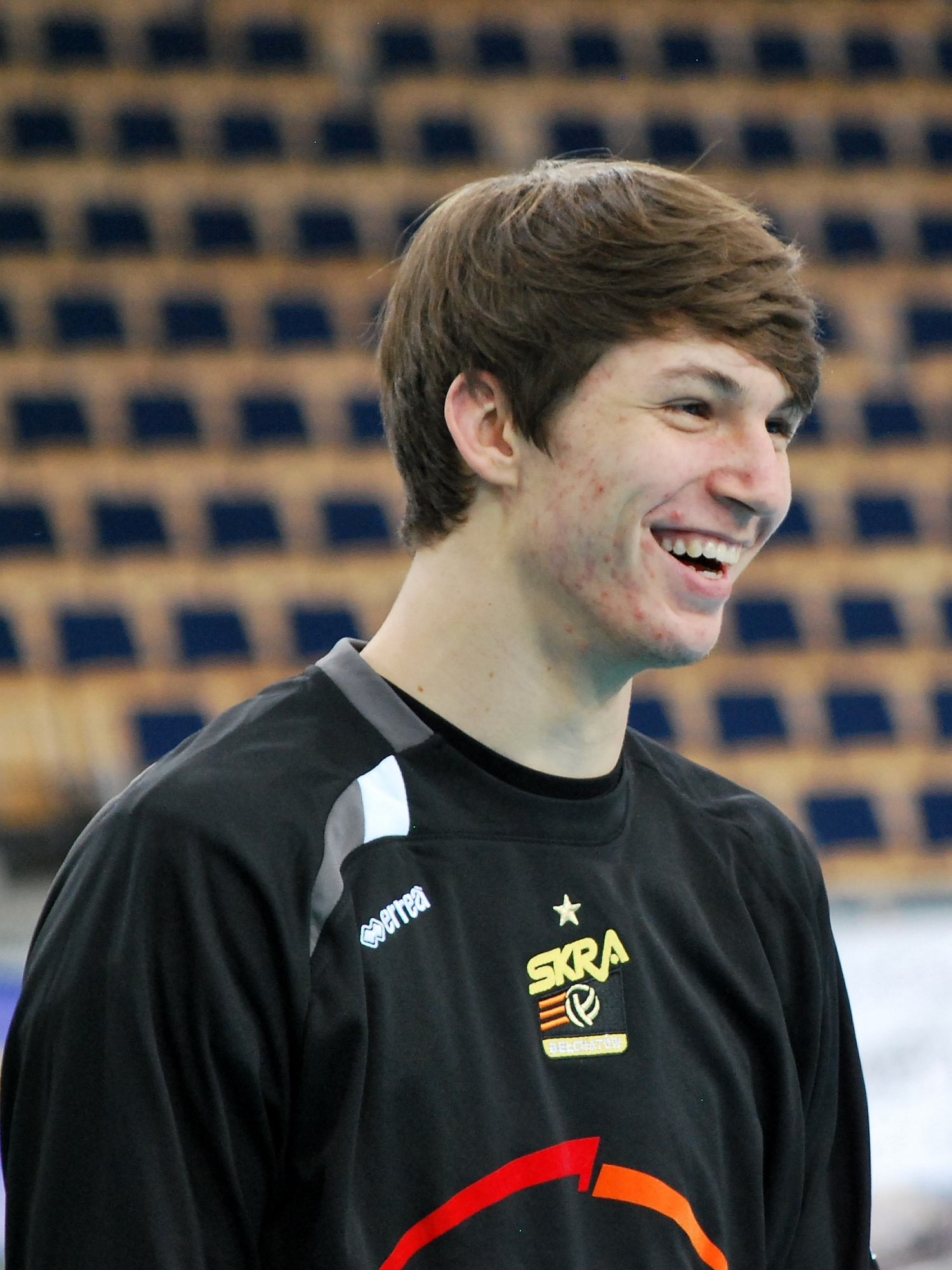

Personal information
- Born: 21 May 1994 (age 32); Wrocław, Poland
- Height: 2.07 m (6 ft 9 in)
- Weight: 92 kg (203 lb)
- Spike: 365 cm (144 in)
- Block: 340 cm (134 in)

Volleyball information
- Position: Opposite
- Current club: ChKS Chełm
- Number: 1

Career
Years	Teams
2012–2015; 2015–2018; 2018–2019; 2019; 2019–2020; 2020–2021; 2021; 2021–2023; 2023–2024; 2024–2025; 2025–2026; 2026–	Skra Bełchatów; Jastrzębski Węgiel; Trefl Gdańsk; Onico Warsaw; Gazprom-Ugra Surgut; Ural Ufa; Sir Safety Perugia; Asseco Resovia; Stal Nysa; Tokyo Great Bears; Al Hilal; ChKS Chełm

National team
2016–	Poland
Honours
Men's volleyball
Representing Poland
FIVB World Cup
Silver medal – second place	2019 Japan
FIVB Nations League
Silver medal – second place	2021 Rimini
Bronze medal – third place	2019 Chicago
CEV European Championship
Bronze medal – third place	2019 Belgium/France/Netherlands/Slovenia

Maciej Muzaj (born 21 May 1994) is a Polish professional volleyball player who plays as an opposite spiker for ChKS Chełm and the Poland national team.

== Career ==
=== Club ===
He won the 2014 Polish Champion title with PGE Skra Bełchatów. On 19 June 2015, he signed a contract with Jastrzębski Węgiel. He replaced Michał Łasko, whose departure Jastrzębski Węgiel announced on the same day.

== Honours ==
=== Club ===
- Domestic
  - 2013–14 Polish Championship, with PGE Skra Bełchatów
  - 2014–15 Polish SuperCup, with PGE Skra Bełchatów

=== Statistics ===
- 2018–19 PlusLiga – Best scorer (611 points)
- 2018–19 PlusLiga – Best spiker (532 points)
