= JSW =

JSW may refer to:

== Businesses ==
- JSW Group, an Indian business conglomerate
- Japan Steel Works
- Jastrzębska Spółka Węglowa, a Polish coal mining company

== Media ==
- Jet Set Willy, a 1984 computer game
- Journal of the Southwest

== People ==
- James Smith-Williams (born 1997), American football player
- J. S. Wilson (1888-1969), early figure in the Scout movement
