= Adam Kącki =

Polish volleyball player (born 1998)

Personal information
- Nationality: Polish
- Born: October 24, 1998 (age 28)
- Height: 6 ft 4 in (1.94 m)
- Weight: 214 lb (97 kg)
- Spike: 130 in (340 cm)
- Block: 130 in (320 cm)

Volleyball information
- Position: Outside hitter
- Current club: (Poland) KS Lechia Tomaszów Mazowiecki
- Number: 2

Career
- Years: Team
- 2014–2017 2017–2018 2018–2019 2019–: (Poland) Jastrzębski Węgiel (Poland) KS Lechia Tomaszów Mazowiecki (Poland) MKS Aqua Zdrój Wałbrzych (Poland) KS Lechia Tomaszów Mazowiecki

Adam Kącki (born October 24, 1998) is a Polish volleyball player, a member of the club KS Lechia Tomaszów Mazowiecki.
