= Maksymilian Granieczny =

Polish volleyball player (born 2005)

Personal information
- Born: 7 July 2005 (age 21); Czernica, Poland
- Height: 1.79 m (5 ft 10 in)

Volleyball information
- Position: Libero
- Current team: Ślepsk Suwałki
- Number: 18

Career
Years	Teams
2022–2023	Jastrzębski Węgiel
2023–2024	Cuprum Lublin
2024–2025	Stilon Gorzów
2025–2026	Jastrzębski Węgiel
2026–	Ślepsk Suwałki

National team
2022–2023	Poland (cadet)
2024–	Poland (junior)
2024–	Poland U22
2025–	Poland
Honours
Men's volleyball
Representing Poland
FIVB World Championship
Bronze medal – third place	2025 Philippines
FIVB Nations League
Gold medal – first place	2026 Ningbo
CEV European Championship
Gold medal – first place	2026 Bulgaria/Finland/Italy/Romania

Maksymilian Granieczny (born 7 July 2005) is a Polish professional volleyball player who plays as a libero for Ślepsk Suwałki and the Poland national team.

== Early life ==
When he was five, Granieczny began training in rhythmic gymnastics in Radlin, where Leszek Blanik's father was the club president. At that time, Blanik, among others, was his coach. On 12 May 2012, the Radlin Mayor's Cup Gymnastics Tournament was held at the Leszek Blanik Gymnastics Facility in Radlin. He placed second in the junior gymnastics all-around. His father inspired him to develop an interest in volleyball. Granieczny's father played volleyball from elementary school. Later, his mother, Alicja, and his father played amateur volleyball with friends. At the age of nine, he began training in volleyball. His first coach was Małgorzata Łosek.

== Career ==
=== Club ===
As a 15-year-old, Granieczny made his Champions League debut on 24 September 2020, in a group stage qualifier against Dutch club Draisma Dynamo Apeldoorn. He also made his PlusLiga debut on 1 November 2020, in a match against Trefl Gdańsk in the 21st round of the 2020–21 PlusLiga.

=== National team ===
On 30 May 2025, Granieczny made his debut for the Polish national team in the Silesia Cup friendly tournament against Bulgaria.

In his first 2025 Nations League match, he had a 56% touch rate against the Netherlands, and repeated the same result against Serbia. In Week 2 of the competition, in matches at Hoffman Estates, Illinois, United States, he had a 38% touch rate against Italy. He fared better in the reception against the tournament hosts, the United States, where his reception was 67%.

== Personal life ==
Granieczny's father played amateur volleyball. His older brother, Beniamin, enrolled in the sports class and played volleyball.

== Honours ==
=== Club ===
- CEV Champions League
  - 2022–23 – with Jastrzębski Węgiel
- Domestic
  - 2022 Polish SuperCup, with Jastrzębski Węgiel
  - 2022–23 PlusLiga, with Jastrzębski Węgiel
