= Tomaso Totolo =

Italian volleyball coach (born 1965)

Personal information
- Born: 26 November 1965 (age 60) Isola della Scala, Italy

Coaching information
- Current team: Zenit Saint Petersburg
- Previous teams coached
- Years: Teams
- 2001–2006 2003–2005 2006–2007 2007 2007–2011 2010–2011 2011–2012 2012–2013 2013–2024 2019 2020 2024–: BluVolley Verona (AC); Italy (AC); Italy (AC); Jastrzębski Węgiel; Volley Treviso (AC); Netherlands (AC); AZS Olsztyn; Iskra Odintsovo (AC); Zenit Kazan (AC); Serbia (AC); Iran (AC); Zenit Saint Petersburg (AC)

Tomaso Totolo (born 26 November 1965) is an Italian professional volleyball coach with Russian citizenship. He serves as an assistant coach for Zenit Saint Petersburg.
