= Mark Lebedew =

Australian volleyball coach

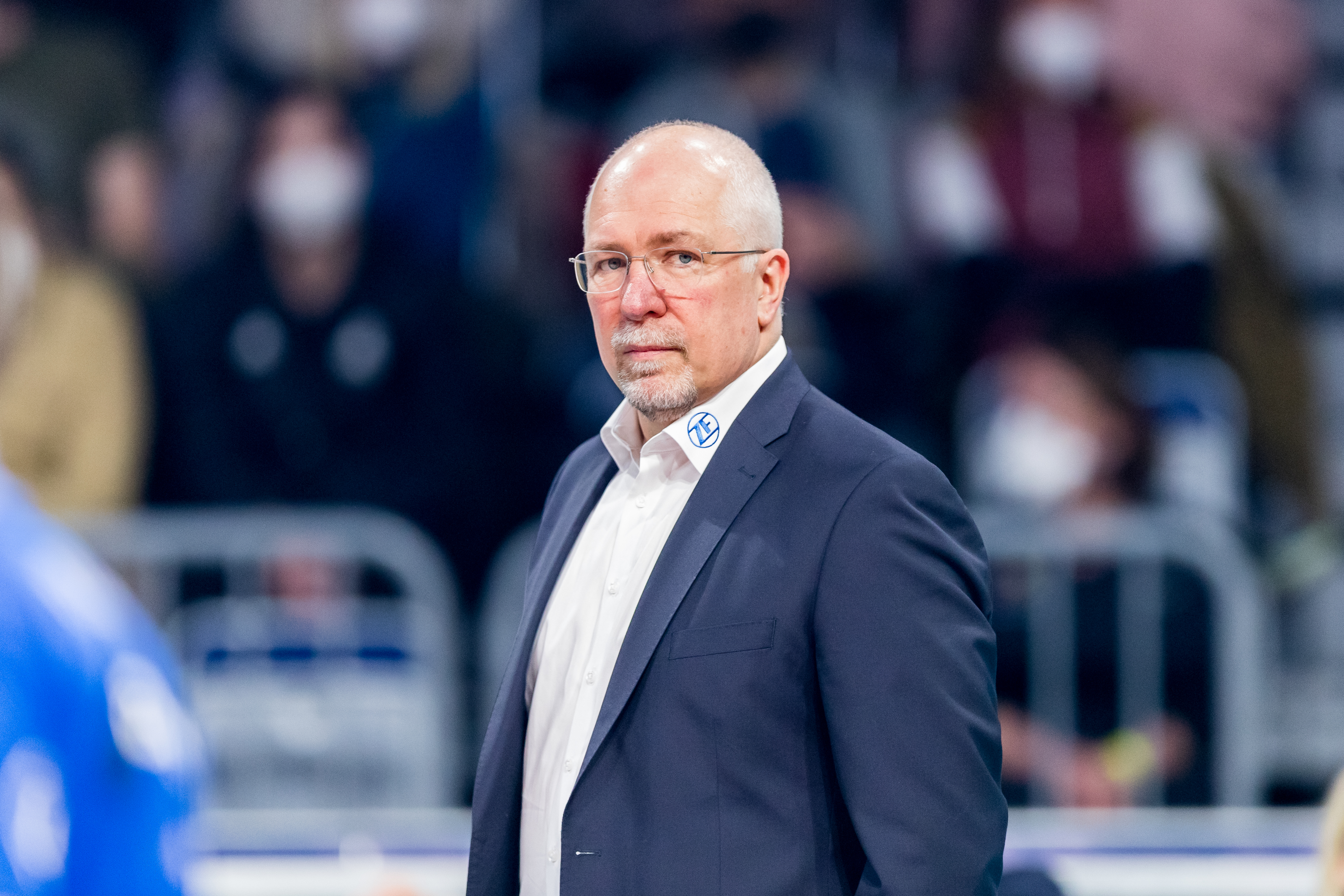

Personal information
- Born: 6 May 1967 (age 59); Adelaide, Australia

Coaching information
- Current team: Lycurgus Groningen
Previous teams coached
Years	Teams
1997–2002; 2003–2005; 2005–2006; 2006–2007; 2008–2009; 2009–2010; 2010–2015; 2015–2018; 2016–2020; 2018–2020; 2021; 2021–2024; 2022; 2024–	Australia (AC); SV Bayer Wuppertal; VC Lennik; Volley Callipo (AC); Jastrzębski Węgiel (AC); VC Franken; Berlin Recycling Volleys; Jastrzębski Węgiel; Australia; Warta Zawiercie; Gwardia Wrocław; VfB Friedrichshafen; Slovenia; Lycurgus Groningen
Honours
Men's volleyball
Head coach Australia
AVC Asian Championship
Silver medal – second place	2019 Iran

Mark Lebedew (born 6 May 1967) is an Australian professional volleyball coach. He serves as head coach for Lycurgus Groningen.

== Personal life ==
Mark Lebedew lives in Żory, and is married to Anita with whom he has a son, Daniel. He obtained Polish citizenship in 2022.

== Career ==
=== Club ===
In 2010, Lebedew took charge of Berlin Recycling Volleys, with whom he won three German Champion titles, in 2012, 2013 and 2014. In 2015, he led Berlin Recycling Volleys to the CEV Champions League bronze medal after defeating PGE Skra Bełchatów in a third place match (3–2). In 2015, he moved to Poland and led his team, Jastrzębski Węgiel, to the PlusLiga bronze medal in 2017. In 2018, he signed a contract with Warta Zawiercie. He finished in fourth place in the 2018–19 PlusLiga season, the highest ever finish in club's history.

=== National team ===
In 2017, Lebedew was appointed new head coach of the Australia national team. In January 2020, he resigned his post after missing qualifying for the Tokyo Olympic Games at the Asian Qualifying Tournament held in China.

In February 2022, he took charge of the Slovenia national team. He was dismissed in August 2022, after failing to reach the top 8 in the 2022 Nations League.

== Honours ==
=== Club ===
- Domestic
  - 2011–12 German Championship, with Berlin Recycling Volleys
  - 2012–13 German Championship, with Berlin Recycling Volleys
  - 2013–14 German Championship, with Berlin Recycling Volleys
  - 2021–22 German Cup, with VfB Friedrichshafen

Sporting positions
Preceded by (Italy) Alberto Giuliani	Head coach of Slovenia; 2022	Succeeded by (Romania) Gheorghe Crețu
