= Ryszard Bosek =

Polish volleyball player and coach

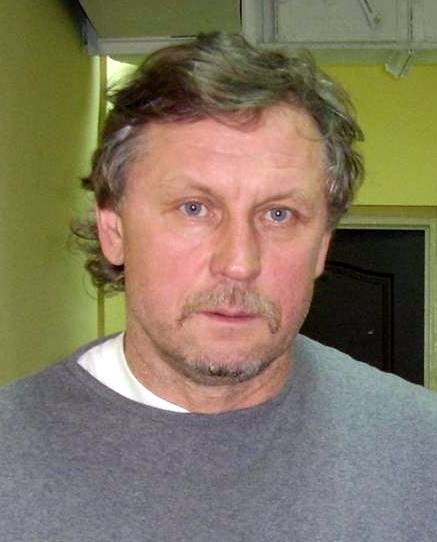

Personal information
- Nickname: Bubu
- Born: 12 April 1950 (age 76); Kamienna Góra, Poland
- Height: 189 cm (6 ft 2 in)

Coaching information
Previous teams coached
Years	Teams
1983–1984; 1984–1985; 1985–1987; 1987–1990; 2000–2001; 2006–2007	Pallavolo Padova (AC); Pallavolo Padova; Płomień Milowice; AZS Częstochowa (AC); Poland; Jastrzębski Węgiel

Career
Years	Teams
1969–1973; 1973–1980; 1980–1985	AZS AWF Warsaw; Płomień Milowice; Pallavolo Padova

National team
1969–1986	Poland (359)
Honours
Men's volleyball
Representing Poland
Olympic Games
Gold medal – first place	1976 Montreal
FIVB World Championship
Gold medal – first place	1974 Mexico
CEV European Championship
Silver medal – second place	1975 Yugoslavia
Silver medal – second place	1977 Finland
Silver medal – second place	1979 France

Ryszard Bosek (born 12 April 1950) is a Polish former volleyball player and coach. He was a member of the Poland national team from 1969 to 1986, and a participant in three Olympic Games (1972, 1976, 1980). During his career, he won gold medals in the 1974 World Championship and the 1976 Summer Olympics.

== Personal life ==
Bosek was born in Kamienna Góra, Poland. In 2008, he had cancer, and returned to health after receiving treatment. He worked as a volleyball expert for Polsat Sport, and as a manager of a few volleyball players (Bartosz Kurek, Piotr Nowakowski, Jakub Jarosz).

== Career ==
=== National team ===
Bosek participated in several World Championships: 1970 (5th place), 1974, and 1978 (8th place). In 1974, Poland won the World Championship title for the very first time.

Among Bosek's achievements, he has three silver medals of the European Championship (1975, 1977, 1979). In all three cases, Poland lost to the Soviet Union.

Bosek was a participant in the following Olympic Games: 1972 Munich, 1976 Montreal, and 1980 Moscow. In 1976, as one of the players of the team led by Hubert Jerzy Wagner, he won a gold medal. Poland won the final match of the tournament against the Soviet Union on 30 July 1976.

== Honours ==
=== As a player ===
- CEV European Champions Cup
  - 1977–78 – with Płomień Milowice
- Domestic
  - 1976–77 Polish Championship, with Płomień Milowice
  - 1978–79 Polish Championship, with Płomień Milowice

Sporting positions
Preceded by (Poland) Ireneusz Mazur	Head coach of Poland; 2000–2001	Succeeded by (Poland) Waldemar Wspaniały
