= Jan Such =

Polish volleyball player and coach (born 1948)

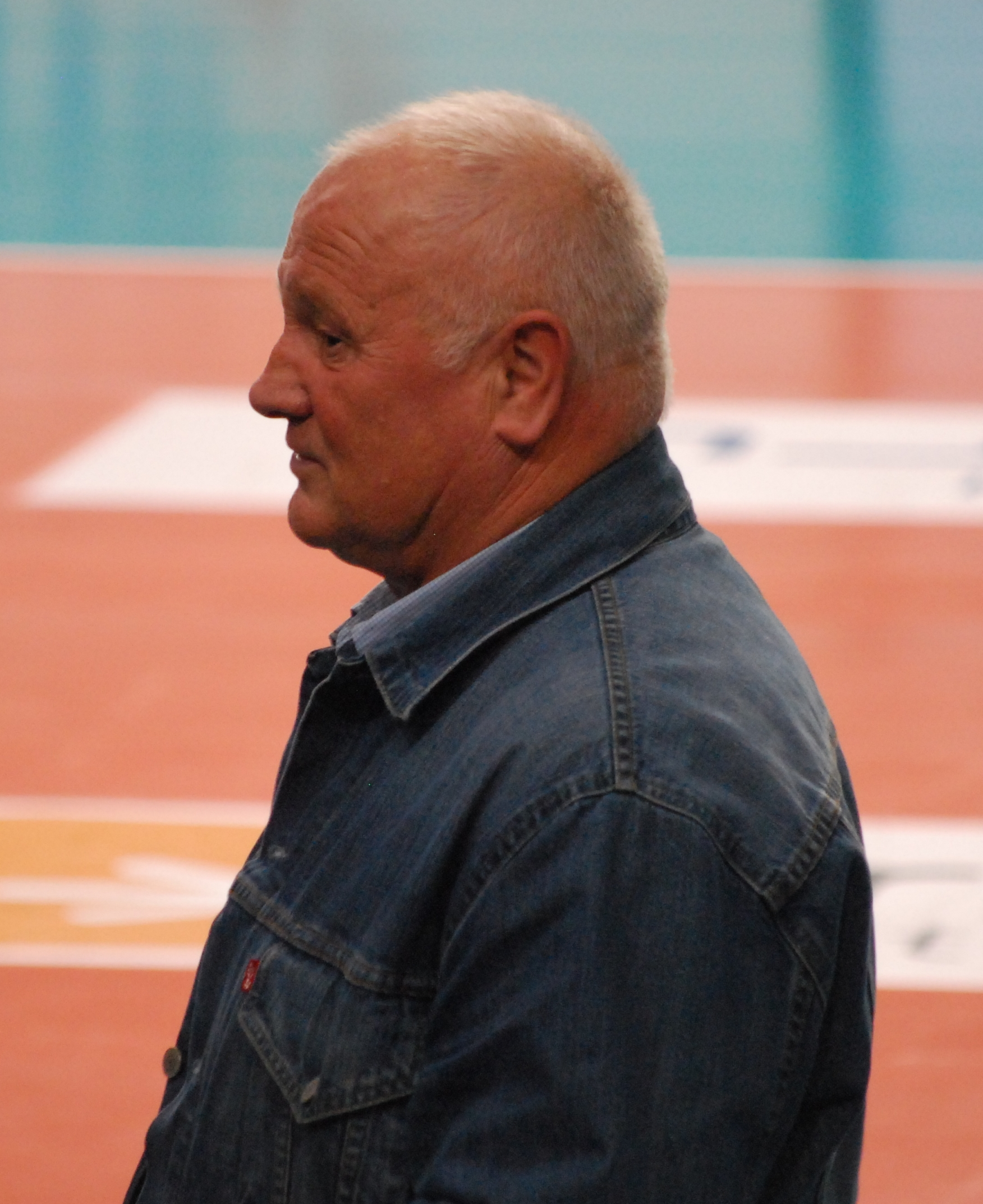
- Jan Such in 2011

Personal information
- Nationality: Polish
- Born: 8 February 1948 (age 78) Jedlicze, Poland

Sport
- Sport: Volleyball

Jan Such (born 8 February 1948) is a Polish former volleyball player and coach. He competed in the men's tournament at the 1972 Summer Olympics.
