= Igor Prieložný =

Slovak volleyball player (born 1957)

Personal information
- Nationality: Slovak
- Born: 25 February 1957 (age 68) Trnava, Czechoslovakia

Sport
- Sport: Volleyball

Igor Prieložný (born 25 February 1957) is a Slovak former volleyball player. He competed in the men's tournament at the 1980 Summer Olympics.
