= 2019–20 CEV Champions League =

- League: CEV Champions League
- Sport: Volleyball
- Duration: Qualifying round: 22 October – 27 November 2019; Main tournament: 3 December 2019 – 11 March 2020
- Number of teams: 28 (10 qual. + 18 main tourn.)

CEV Champions League seasons
- ← 2018–19 2020–21 →

The 2020–21 CEV Champions League was the 61st edition of the highest level European volleyball club competition organised by the European Volleyball Confederation.

The tournament has been cancelled due to the 2020 coronavirus outbreak.

== Qualification ==
| Rank | Country | Number of teams | | | Qualified teams |
| Rank | Country | Vac | Qual | Total | Qualified teams |
|---|---|---|---|---|---|
| 1 | Italy | 3 | – | 3 | Cucine Lube Civitanova |
| 1 | Italy | 3 | – | 3 | Sir Sicoma Monini Perugia |
| 1 | Italy | 3 | – | 3 | Itas Trentino |
| 2 | Russia | 3 | – | 3 | Kuzbass Kemerovo |
| 2 | Russia | 3 | – | 3 | Zenit Kazan |
| 2 | Russia | 3 | – | 3 | Fakel Novy Urengoy |
| 3 | Poland | 3 | – | 3 | ZAKSA Kędzierzyn-Koźle |
| 3 | Poland | 3 | – | 3 | Projekt Warsaw |
| 3 | Poland | 3 | – | 3 | Jastrzębski Węgiel |
| 4 | Turkey | 2 | – | 2 | Fenerbahçe SK İstanbul |
| 4 | Turkey | 2 | – | 2 | Halkbank Ankara |
| 5 | Germany | 2 | – | 2 | Berlin Recycling Volleys |
| 5 | Germany | 2 | – | 2 | VfB Friedrichshafen |
| 6 | Belgium | 2 | – | 2 | Greenyard Maaseik |
| 6 | Belgium | 2 | – | 2 | Knack Roeselare |
| 7 | France | 1 | – | 1 | Tours VB |
| 8 | Slovenia | 1 | – | 1 | ACH Volley Ljubljana |
| 10 | Czech Republic | 1 | – | 1 | Jihostroj České Budějovice |
| 12 | Serbia | – | 1 | 1 | Vojvodina NS Seme Novi Sad |
| 50 | Portugal | – | 1 | 1 | Sport Lisboa e Benfica |

== Pools composition ==
Drawing of Lots was held on 25 October 2019 in Sofia.

| Pool A | Pool B | Pool C |
|---|---|---|
| Cucine Lube Civitanova | Kuzbass Kemerovo | Zenit Kazan |
| Fenerbahçe SK İstanbul | Berlin Recycling Volleys | Halkbank Ankara |
| Jihostroj České Budějovice | ACH Volley Ljubljana | Greenyard Maaseik |
| Itas Trentino | Fakel Novy Urengoy | Jastrzębski Węgiel |

| Pool D | Pool E |
|---|---|
| Sir Sicoma Monini Perugia | ZAKSA Kędzierzyn-Koźle |
| Projekt Warsaw | VfB Friedrichshafen |
| Tours VB | Knack Roeselare |
| Sport Lisboa e Benfica | Vojvodina NS Seme Novi Sad |

== League round ==
- 20 teams compete in the League round.
- The teams are split into 5 groups, each one featuring four teams.
- The top team in each pool and 3 best 2nd placed teams qualify for the quarterfinals.
- All times are local.

=== Pool A ===
| Pos | Team | Pld | W | L | Pts | SW | SL | SR | SPW | SPL | SPR | Qualification |
|---|---|---|---|---|---|---|---|---|---|---|---|---|
| 1 | (Italy) Cucine Lube Civitanova | 6 | 6 | 0 | 18 | 18 | 5 | 3.600 | 563 | 468 | 1.203 | Quarterfinals |
| 2 | (Italy) Itas Trentino | 6 | 4 | 2 | 10 | 13 | 11 | 1.182 | 537 | 519 | 1.035 | Quarterfinals |
| 3 | (Czech Republic) Jihostroj České Budějovice | 6 | 2 | 4 | 6 | 10 | 14 | 0.714 | 486 | 545 | 0.892 | |
| 4 | (Turkey) Fenerbahçe SK İstanbul | 6 | 0 | 6 | 2 | 7 | 18 | 0.389 | 521 | 575 | 0.906 | |

| Date | Time | | Score | | Set 1 | Set 2 | Set 3 | Set 4 | Set 5 | Total | Report |
|---|---|---|---|---|---|---|---|---|---|---|---|
| 5 Dec | 18:00 | Fenerbahçe SK İstanbul (Turkey) | 2–3 | (Czech Republic) Jihostroj České Budějovice | 20–25 | 25–21 | 25–17 | 21–25 | 12–15 | 103–103 | Report |
| 12 Dec | 18:00 | Jihostroj České Budějovice (Czech Republic) | 1–3 | (Italy) Cucine Lube Civitanova | 18–25 | 25–21 | 13–25 | 22–25 | | 78–96 | Report |
| 12 Dec | 20:30 | Itas Trentino (Italy) | 3–2 | (Turkey) Fenerbahçe SK İstanbul | 21–25 | 23–25 | 25–18 | 25–17 | 16–14 | 110–99 | Report |
| 19 Dec | 18:30 | Fenerbahçe SK İstanbul (Turkey) | 1–3 | (Italy) Cucine Lube Civitanova | 15–25 | 19–25 | 25–20 | 17–25 | | 76–95 | Report |
| 19 Dec | 20:30 | Itas Trentino (Italy) | 3–0 | (Czech Republic) Jihostroj České Budějovice | 25–11 | 25–16 | 25–21 | | | 75–48 | Report |
| 26 Jan | 18:00 | Cucine Lube Civitanova (Italy) | 3–0 | (Italy) Itas Trentino | 25–21 | 25–18 | 25–15 | | | 75–54 | Report |
| 28 Jan | 20:30 | Cucine Lube Civitanova (Italy) | 3–1 | (Czech Republic) Jihostroj České Budějovice | 25–21 | 25–19 | 21–25 | 25–19 | | 96–84 | Report |
| 30 Jan | 18:00 | Fenerbahçe SK İstanbul (Turkey) | 1–3 | (Italy) Itas Trentino | 25–17 | 22–25 | 27–29 | 20–25 | | 94–96 | Report |
| 13 Feb | 17:00 | Jihostroj České Budějovice (Czech Republic) | 3–0 | (Turkey) Fenerbahçe SK İstanbul | 25–23 | 25–23 | 25–21 | | | 75–67 | Report |
| 13 Feb | 20:30 | Itas Trentino (Italy) | 1–3 | (Italy) Cucine Lube Civitanova | 26–24 | 29–31 | 17–25 | 22–25 | | 94–105 | Report |
| 19 Feb | 17:00 | Jihostroj České Budějovice (Czech Republic) | 2–3 | (Italy) Itas Trentino | 25–21 | 25–22 | 15–25 | 22–25 | 11–15 | 98–108 | Report |
| 19 Feb | 20:30 | Cucine Lube Civitanova (Italy) | 3–1 | (Turkey) Fenerbahçe SK İstanbul | 25–17 | 21–25 | 25–18 | 25–22 | | 96–82 | Report |

=== Pool B ===
| Pos | Team | Pld | W | L | Pts | SW | SL | SR | SPW | SPL | SPR | Qualification |
|---|---|---|---|---|---|---|---|---|---|---|---|---|
| 1 | (Russia) Fakel Novy Urengoy | 6 | 5 | 1 | 13 | 15 | 8 | 1.875 | 521 | 470 | 1.109 | Quarterfinals |
| 2 | (Russia) Kuzbass Kemerovo | 6 | 4 | 2 | 12 | 14 | 9 | 1.556 | 517 | 493 | 1.049 | Quarterfinals |
| 3 | (Germany) Berlin Recycling Volleys | 6 | 2 | 4 | 7 | 11 | 14 | 0.786 | 516 | 537 | 0.961 | |
| 4 | (Slovenia) ACH Volley Ljubljana | 6 | 1 | 5 | 4 | 8 | 17 | 0.471 | 518 | 572 | 0.906 | |

| Date | Time | | Score | | Set 1 | Set 2 | Set 3 | Set 4 | Set 5 | Total | Report |
|---|---|---|---|---|---|---|---|---|---|---|---|
| 3 Dec | 19:30 | Berlin Recycling Volleys (Germany) | 3–0 | (Slovenia) ACH Volley Ljubljana | 25–21 | 25–15 | 26–24 | | | 76–60 | Report |
| 4 Dec | 19:00 | Kuzbass Kemerovo (Russia) | 3–0 | (Russia) Fakel Novy Urengoy | 26–24 | 25–21 | 25–18 | | | 76–63 | Report |
| 11 Dec | 18:00 | ACH Volley Ljubljana (Slovenia) | 3–2 | (Russia) Kuzbass Kemerovo | 25–23 | 25–16 | 25–27 | 23–25 | 19–17 | 117–108 | Report |
| 11 Dec | 19:00 | Fakel Novy Urengoy (Russia) | 3–0 | (Germany) Berlin Recycling Volleys | 25–22 | 25–18 | 25–17 | | | 75–57 | Report |
| 17 Dec | 19:00 | Fakel Novy Urengoy (Russia) | 3–1 | (Slovenia) ACH Volley Ljubljana | 24–26 | 25–20 | 25–19 | 25–16 | | 99–81 | Report |
| 18 Dec | 19:30 | Berlin Recycling Volleys (Germany) | 1–3 | (Russia) Kuzbass Kemerovo | 17–25 | 23–25 | 25–19 | 19–25 | | 84–94 | Report |
| 28 Jan | 19:30 | Berlin Recycling Volleys (Germany) | 2–3 | (Russia) Fakel Novy Urengoy | 25–21 | 25–15 | 20–25 | 22–25 | 10–15 | 102–101 | Report |
| 29 Jan | 19:00 | Kuzbass Kemerovo (Russia) | 3–0 | (Slovenia) ACH Volley Ljubljana | 25–19 | 25–23 | 25–21 | | | 75–63 | Report |
| 12 Feb | 18:00 | ACH Volley Ljubljana (Slovenia) | 2–3 | (Germany) Berlin Recycling Volleys | 25–22 | 25–19 | 16–25 | 22–25 | 12–15 | 100–106 | Report |
| 12 Feb | 19:00 | Fakel Novy Urengoy (Russia) | 3–0 | (Russia) Kuzbass Kemerovo | 25–21 | 25–16 | 25–20 | | | 75–57 | Report |
| 19 Feb | 18:00 | ACH Volley Ljubljana (Slovenia) | 2–3 | (Russia) Fakel Novy Urengoy | 18–25 | 25–23 | 25–20 | 18–25 | 11–15 | 97–108 | Report |
| 19 Feb | 19:00 | Kuzbass Kemerovo (Russia) | 3–2 | (Germany) Berlin Recycling Volleys | 22–25 | 25–19 | 25–14 | 20–25 | 15–8 | 107–91 | Report |

=== Pool C ===
| Pos | Team | Pld | W | L | Pts | SW | SL | SR | SPW | SPL | SPR | Qualification |
|---|---|---|---|---|---|---|---|---|---|---|---|---|
| 1 | (Poland) Jastrzębski Węgiel | 6 | 5 | 1 | 15 | 17 | 6 | 2.833 | 531 | 464 | 1.144 | Quarterfinals |
| 2 | (Belgium) Greenyard Maaseik | 6 | 4 | 2 | 9 | 12 | 13 | 0.923 | 537 | 570 | 0.942 | |
| 3 | (Russia) Zenit Kazan | 6 | 3 | 3 | 11 | 14 | 11 | 1.273 | 581 | 530 | 1.096 | |
| 4 | (Turkey) Halkbank Ankara | 6 | 0 | 6 | 1 | 5 | 18 | 0.278 | 483 | 568 | 0.850 | |

| Date | Time | | Score | | Set 1 | Set 2 | Set 3 | Set 4 | Set 5 | Total | Report |
|---|---|---|---|---|---|---|---|---|---|---|---|
| 4 Dec | 17:30 | Halkbank Ankara (Turkey) | 2–3 | (Belgium) Greenyard Maaseik | 25–20 | 25–23 | 27–29 | 20–25 | 10–15 | 107–112 | Report |
| 11 Dec | 18:00 | Jastrzębski Węgiel (Poland) | 3–0 | (Turkey) Halkbank Ankara | 25–17 | 25–17 | 25–21 | | | 75–55 | Report |
| 11 Dec | 20:30 | Greenyard Maaseik (Belgium) | 3–2 | (Russia) Zenit Kazan | 20–25 | 18–25 | 25–23 | 25–22 | 20–18 | 108–113 | Report |
| 18 Dec | 17:30 | Halkbank Ankara (Turkey) | 1–3 | (Russia) Zenit Kazan | 26–24 | 23–25 | 20–25 | 22–25 | | 91–99 | Report |
| 19 Dec | 18:00 | Jastrzębski Węgiel (Poland) | 3–0 | (Belgium) Greenyard Maaseik | 25–17 | 25–20 | 25–21 | | | 75–58 | Report |
| 18 Jan | 19:00 | Zenit Kazan (Russia) | 2–3 | (Poland) Jastrzębski Węgiel | 25–18 | 16–25 | 25–20 | 22–25 | 14–16 | 102–104 | Report |
| 29 Jan | 17:30 | Halkbank Ankara (Turkey) | 0–3 | (Poland) Jastrzębski Węgiel | 18–25 | 18–25 | 15–25 | | | 51–75 | Report |
| 29 Jan | 19:00 | Zenit Kazan (Russia) | 3–0 | (Belgium) Greenyard Maaseik | 25–14 | 25–10 | 25–22 | | | 75–46 | Report |
| 12 Feb | 18:00 | Jastrzębski Węgiel (Poland) | 3–1 | (Russia) Zenit Kazan | 25–18 | 30–28 | 19–25 | 25–23 | | 99–94 | Report |
| 12 Feb | 20:30 | Greenyard Maaseik (Belgium) | 3–1 | (Turkey) Halkbank Ankara | 25–22 | 34–36 | 25–21 | 25–18 | | 109–97 | Report |
| 19 Feb | 19:00 | Zenit Kazan (Russia) | 3–1 | (Turkey) Halkbank Ankara | 25–23 | 23–25 | 25–19 | 25–15 | | 98–82 | Report |
| 19 Feb | 20:30 | Greenyard Maaseik (Belgium) | 3–2 | (Poland) Jastrzębski Węgiel | 25–23 | 20–25 | 19–25 | 25–22 | 15–8 | 104–103 | Report |

=== Pool D ===
| Pos | Team | Pld | W | L | Pts | SW | SL | SR | SPW | SPL | SPR | Qualification |
|---|---|---|---|---|---|---|---|---|---|---|---|---|
| 1 | (Italy) Sir Sicoma Monini Perugia | 6 | 6 | 0 | 18 | 18 | 4 | 4.500 | 553 | 456 | 1.213 | Quarterfinals |
| 2 | (France) Tours VB | 6 | 3 | 3 | 9 | 9 | 11 | 0.818 | 451 | 467 | 0.966 | |
| 3 | (Poland) Projekt Warsaw | 6 | 2 | 4 | 6 | 9 | 12 | 0.750 | 461 | 487 | 0.947 | |
| 4 | (Portugal) Sport Lisboa e Benfica | 6 | 1 | 5 | 3 | 7 | 16 | 0.438 | 491 | 546 | 0.899 | |

| Date | Time | | Score | | Set 1 | Set 2 | Set 3 | Set 4 | Set 5 | Total | Report |
|---|---|---|---|---|---|---|---|---|---|---|---|
| 4 Dec | 19:00 | Projekt Warsaw (Poland) | 3–0 | (France) Tours VB | 25–15 | 25–22 | 25–23 | | | 75–60 | Report |
| 4 Dec | 20:30 | Sir Sicoma Monini Perugia (Italy) | 3–1 | (Portugal) Sport Lisboa e Benfica | 25–18 | 24–26 | 25–15 | 25–19 | | 99–78 | Report |
| 10 Dec | 17:15 | Sport Lisboa e Benfica (Portugal) | 3–1 | (Poland) Projekt Warsaw | 25–19 | 25–17 | 22–25 | 25–21 | | 97–82 | Report |
| 11 Dec | 20:00 | Tours VB (France) | 0–3 | (Italy) Sir Sicoma Monini Perugia | 30–32 | 19–25 | 18–25 | | | 67–82 | Report |
| 17 Dec | 20:30 | Projekt Warsaw (Poland) | 1–3 | (Italy) Sir Sicoma Monini Perugia | 17–25 | 25–23 | 21–25 | 24–26 | | 87–99 | Report |
| 19 Dec | 20:00 | Sport Lisboa e Benfica (Portugal) | 1–3 | (France) Tours VB | 20–25 | 25–20 | 22–25 | 18–25 | | 85–95 | Report |
| 29 Jan | 19:00 | Projekt Warsaw (Poland) | 3–0 | (Portugal) Sport Lisboa e Benfica | 25–21 | 25–13 | 25–22 | | | 75–56 | Report |
| 29 Jan | 20:30 | Sir Sicoma Monini Perugia (Italy) | 3–0 | (France) Tours VB | 25–21 | 25–15 | 25–21 | | | 75–57 | Report |
| 12 Feb | 20:00 | Tours VB (France) | 3–0 | (Poland) Projekt Warsaw | 25–21 | 25–21 | 25–20 | | | 75–62 | Report |
| 13 Feb | 20:00 | Sport Lisboa e Benfica (Portugal) | 1–3 | (Italy) Sir Sicoma Monini Perugia | 24–26 | 21–25 | 25–22 | 17–25 | | 87–98 | Report |
| 19 Feb | 20:00 | Tours VB (France) | 3–1 | (Portugal) Sport Lisboa e Benfica | 25–23 | 22–25 | 25–23 | 25–17 | | 97–88 | Report |
| 19 Feb | 20:30 | Sir Sicoma Monini Perugia (Italy) | 3–1 | (Poland) Projekt Warsaw | 25–17 | 25–27 | 25–17 | 25–19 | | 100–80 | Report |

=== Pool E ===
| Pos | Team | Pld | W | L | Pts | SW | SL | SR | SPW | SPL | SPR | Qualification |
|---|---|---|---|---|---|---|---|---|---|---|---|---|
| 1 | (Poland) ZAKSA Kędzierzyn-Koźle | 6 | 6 | 0 | 18 | 18 | 0 | MAX | 450 | 356 | 1.264 | Quarterfinals |
| 2 | (Belgium) Knack Roeselare | 6 | 4 | 2 | 11 | 12 | 9 | 1.333 | 480 | 466 | 1.030 | Quarterfinals |
| 3 | (Germany) VfB Friedrichshafen | 6 | 2 | 4 | 5 | 7 | 14 | 0.500 | 458 | 491 | 0.933 | |
| 4 | (Serbia) Vojvodina NS Seme Novi Sad | 6 | 0 | 6 | 2 | 4 | 18 | 0.222 | 442 | 517 | 0.855 | |

| Date | Time | | Score | | Set 1 | Set 2 | Set 3 | Set 4 | Set 5 | Total | Report |
|---|---|---|---|---|---|---|---|---|---|---|---|
| 3 Dec | 18:00 | ZAKSA Kędzierzyn-Koźle (Poland) | 3–0 | (Serbia) Vojvodina NS Seme Novi Sad | 25–20 | 25–21 | 25–21 | | | 75–62 | Report |
| 4 Dec | 20:00 | VfB Friedrichshafen (Germany) | 0–3 | (Belgium) Knack Roeselare | 23–25 | 21–25 | 15–25 | | | 59–75 | Report |
| 10 Dec | 18:00 | Vojvodina NS Seme Novi Sad (Serbia) | 0–3 | (Germany) VfB Friedrichshafen | 20–25 | 21–25 | 20–25 | | | 61–75 | Report |
| 10 Dec | 20:30 | Knack Roeselare (Belgium) | 0–3 | (Poland) ZAKSA Kędzierzyn-Koźle | 17–25 | 19–25 | 21–25 | | | 57–75 | Report |
| 17 Dec | 18:00 | Vojvodina NS Seme Novi Sad (Serbia) | 2–3 | (Belgium) Knack Roeselare | 21–25 | 20–25 | 25–22 | 25–22 | 12–15 | 103–109 | Report |
| 18 Dec | 20:00 | VfB Friedrichshafen (Germany) | 0–3 | (Poland) ZAKSA Kędzierzyn-Koźle | 23–25 | 22–25 | 20–25 | | | 65–75 | Report |
| 28 Jan | 18:00 | ZAKSA Kędzierzyn-Koźle (Poland) | 3–0 | (Belgium) Knack Roeselare | 25–19 | 25–18 | 25–20 | | | 75–57 | Report |
| 29 Jan | 20:00 | VfB Friedrichshafen (Germany) | 3–2 | (Serbia) Vojvodina NS Seme Novi Sad | 23–25 | 25–18 | 17–25 | 25–20 | 15–13 | 105–101 | Report |
| 11 Feb | 18:00 | Vojvodina NS Seme Novi Sad (Serbia) | 0–3 | (Poland) ZAKSA Kędzierzyn-Koźle | 11–25 | 22–25 | 18–25 | | | 51–75 | Report |
| 11 Feb | 20:30 | Knack Roeselare (Belgium) | 3–1 | (Germany) VfB Friedrichshafen | 28–26 | 26–28 | 25–19 | 25–17 | | 104–90 | Report |
| 19 Feb | 18:00 | ZAKSA Kędzierzyn-Koźle (Poland) | 3–0 | (Germany) VfB Friedrichshafen | 25–21 | 25–21 | 25–22 | | | 75–64 | Report |
| 19 Feb | 20:30 | Knack Roeselare (Belgium) | 3–0 | (Serbia) Vojvodina NS Seme Novi Sad | 28–26 | 25–20 | 25–18 | | | 78–64 | Report |

=== Second place ranking ===
| Pos | Team | Pld | W | L | Pts | SW | SL | SR | SPW | SPL | SPR | Qualification |
|---|---|---|---|---|---|---|---|---|---|---|---|---|
| 1 | (Russia) Kuzbass Kemerovo | 6 | 4 | 2 | 12 | 14 | 9 | 1.556 | 517 | 493 | 1.049 | Quarterfinals |
| 2 | (Belgium) Knack Roeselare | 6 | 4 | 2 | 11 | 12 | 9 | 1.333 | 480 | 402 | 1.194 | Quarterfinals |
| 3 | (Italy) Itas Trentino | 6 | 4 | 2 | 10 | 13 | 11 | 1.182 | 537 | 519 | 1.035 | Quarterfinals |
| 4 | (Belgium) Greenyard Maaseik | 6 | 4 | 2 | 9 | 12 | 13 | 0.923 | 537 | 570 | 0.942 | |
| 5 | (France) Tours VB | 6 | 3 | 3 | 9 | 9 | 11 | 0.818 | 451 | 467 | 0.966 | |

== Quarterfinals ==
- The winners of the ties qualify for the semifinals.
- In case the teams are tied after two legs, a Golden Set is played immediately at the completion of the second leg.
- All times are local.

| Pot 1 | Pot 2 |
|---|---|
| ZAKSA Kędzierzyn-Koźle; Sir Sicoma Monini Perugia; Cucine Lube Civitanova; Jastrzębski Węgiel | Fakel Novy Urengoy; Kuzbass Kemerovo; Knack Roeselare; Itas Trentino |

| Team 1 | Agg. | Team 2 | 1st leg | 2nd leg |
|---|---|---|---|---|
| Knack Roeselare (Belgium) | 0–3 | (Italy) Cucine Lube Civitanova | 0–3 | Cancelled |
| Itas Trentino (Italy) | – | (Poland) Jastrzębski Węgiel | Cancelled | Cancelled |
| Fakel Novy Urengoy (Russia) | – | (Italy) Sir Sicoma Monini Perugia | 1–3 | Cancelled |
| Kuzbass Kemerovo (Russia) | 4–2 | (Poland) ZAKSA Kędzierzyn-Koźle | 2–3 | 3–1 |

=== First leg ===
| Date | Time | | Score | | Set 1 | Set 2 | Set 3 | Set 4 | Set 5 | Total | Report |
|---|---|---|---|---|---|---|---|---|---|---|---|
| 4 Mar | 20:30 | Knack Roeselare (Belgium) | 0–3 | (Italy) Cucine Lube Civitanova | 29–31 | 14–25 | 16–25 | | | 59–81 | Report |
| 4 Mar | 19:00 | Fakel Novy Urengoy (Russia) | 1–3 | (Italy) Sir Sicoma Monini Perugia | 23–25 | 21–25 | 25–22 | 21–25 | | 90–97 | Report |
| 4 Mar | 19:00 | Kuzbass Kemerovo (Russia) | 2–3 | (Poland) ZAKSA Kędzierzyn-Koźle | 25–22 | 24–26 | 25–17 | 26–28 | 14–16 | 114–109 | Report |

=== Second leg ===
| Date | Time | | Score | | Set 1 | Set 2 | Set 3 | Set 4 | Set 5 | Total | Report |
|---|---|---|---|---|---|---|---|---|---|---|---|
| 11 Mar | 18:00 | ZAKSA Kędzierzyn-Koźle (Poland) | 1–3 | (Russia) Kuzbass Kemerovo | 25–21 | 23–25 | 18–25 | 20–25 | | 86–96 | Report |
