= 2020–21 CEV Champions League qualification =

This article shows the qualification phase for the 2020–21 CEV Champions League. 18 teams will play in the qualification round. The two remaining teams will join the other 18 teams automatically qualified to the League round based on the European Cups' Ranking List. All 16 eliminated teams will compete in the 2020–21 CEV Cup.

== Participating teams ==
The Drawing of Lots took place on 21 August 2020 in Luxembourg City.

Rank	Country	Team(s)	Outcome (Qualified to)
1	Italy	Itas Trentino	CEV Champions League
2	Russia	Dynamo Moscow	CEV Cup
3	Poland	Jastrzębski Węgiel	CEV Champions League
6	Belgium	Greenyard Maaseik	CEV Cup
11	Serbia	Vojvodina Novi Sad	CEV Cup
12	Finland	Ford Levoranta Sastamala	CEV Cup
13	Netherlands	Draisma Dynamo Apeldoorn	CEV Cup
14	Bulgaria	Neftochimik Burgas	CEV Cup
15	Austria	SK Zadruga Aich/Dob	CEV Cup
16	Belarus	Stroitel Minsk	CEV Cup
16	Belarus	Shakhtior Soligorsk	CEV Cup
18	Romania	CSM Arcada Galați	CEV Cup
23	Switzerland	Lindaren Volley Amriswil	CEV Cup
26	Croatia	Ribola Kaštela	CEV Cup
26	Croatia	Mladost Zagreb	CEV Cup
28	Hungary	Fino Kaposvár	CEV Cup
31	Albania	Erzeni Shijakut	CEV Cup
34	England	IBB Polonia London	CEV Cup

== First round ==
- 18 teams compete in the first round
- The teams are split into 6 groups, each one featuring three teams
- Winner of each pool advance to the second round
- All times are local.

=== Pool A ===
Pos	Team	Pld	W	L	Pts	SW	SL	SR	SPW	SPL	SPR	Qualification
1	(Hungary) Fino Kaposvár	4	4	0	12	12	0	MAX	300	103	2.913	Second round
2	(Albania) Erzeni Shijakut	4	2	2	6	6	6	1.000	253	150	1.687	
3	(Croatia) Mladost Zagreb (Note: Mladost Zagreb withdrew from the competition due to the positive COVID-19 test results.) (H)	4	0	4	0	0	12	0.000	0	300	0.000	

(H) Tournament host
Notes:

Date	Time		Score		Set 1	Set 2	Set 3	Set 4	Set 5	Total	Report
23 Sep	16:00	Fino Kaposvár (Hungary)	3–0	(Albania) Erzeni Shijakut	25–16	25–19	25–19			75–54	Report
24 Sep	18:00	Erzeni Shijakut (Albania)	0–3	(Hungary) Fino Kaposvár	18–25	16–25	15–25			49–75	Report

=== Pool B ===
Pos	Team	Pld	W	L	Pts	SW	SL	SR	SPW	SPL	SPR	Qualification
1	(Romania) CSM Arcada Galați (H)	2	2	0	5	6	2	3.000	189	107	1.766	Second round
2	(Finland) Ford Levoranta Sastamala	2	1	1	4	5	3	1.667	182	163	1.117	
3	(Croatia) Ribola Kaštela (Note: Ribola Kaštela was not able to deliver the COVID-19 test results before their first match of the tournament. As a result, the Romanian team of CSM Arcada Galați claimed a 3–0 forfeit victory (25–0, 25–0, 25–0).)	2	0	2	0	0	6	0.000	49	150	0.327	

(H) Tournament host
Notes:

Date	Time		Score		Set 1	Set 2	Set 3	Set 4	Set 5	Total	Report
23 Sep	20:00	Ford Levoranta Sastamala (Finland)	3–0	(Croatia) Ribola Kaštela	25–10	25–22	25–17			75–49	Report
24 Sep	18:00	CSM Arcada Galați (Romania)	3–2	(Finland) Ford Levoranta Sastamala	28–26	18–25	25–13	23–25	20–18	114–107	Report

=== Pool C ===
Pos	Team	Pld	W	L	Pts	SW	SL	SR	SPW	SPL	SPR	Qualification
1	(Poland) Jastrzębski Węgiel (H)	2	2	0	6	6	0	MAX	153	116	1.319	Second round
2	(Netherlands) Draisma Dynamo Apeldoorn	2	1	1	3	3	3	1.000	128	132	0.970	
3	(Belarus) Stroitel Minsk	2	0	2	0	0	6	0.000	120	153	0.784	

(H) Tournament host

Date	Time		Score		Set 1	Set 2	Set 3	Set 4	Set 5	Total	Report
22 Sep	20:30	Stroitel Minsk (Belarus)	0–3	(Poland) Jastrzębski Węgiel	25–27	24–26	14–25			63–78	Report
23 Sep	18:00	Draisma Dynamo Apeldoorn (Netherlands)	3–0	(Belarus) Stroitel Minsk	25–23	25–16	25–18			75–57	Report
24 Sep	18:00	Jastrzębski Węgiel (Poland)	3–0	(Netherlands) Draisma Dynamo Apeldoorn	25–20	25–16	25–17			75–53	Report

=== Pool D ===
Pos	Team	Pld	W	L	Pts	SW	SL	SR	SPW	SPL	SPR	Qualification
1	(Russia) Dynamo Moscow	4	4	0	12	12	3	4.000	375	325	1.154	Second round
2	(Austria) SK Zadruga Aich/Dob (H)	4	1	3	4	6	10	0.600	334	352	0.949	
3	(Bulgaria) Neftochimik Burgas	4	1	3	2	6	11	0.545	368	400	0.920	

(H) Tournament host

Date	Time		Score		Set 1	Set 2	Set 3	Set 4	Set 5	Total	Report
27 Sep	20:15	Neftochimik Burgas (Bulgaria)	1–3	(Austria) SK Zadruga Aich/Dob	22–25	19–25	25–16	20–25		86–91	Report
28 Sep	19:00	Dynamo Moscow (Russia)	3–1	(Bulgaria) Neftochimik Burgas	25–21	32–30	21–25	25–22		103–98	Report
29 Sep	20:15	SK Zadruga Aich/Dob (Austria)	1–3	(Russia) Dynamo Moscow	23–25	17–25	25–17	22–25		87–92	Report
30 Sep	20:15	SK Zadruga Aich/Dob (Austria)	2–3	(Bulgaria) Neftochimik Burgas	20–25	25–13	25–21	18–25	13–15	101–99	Report
1 Oct	19:00	Neftochimik Burgas (Bulgaria)	1–3	(Russia) Dynamo Moscow	19–25	23–25	32–30	11–25		85–105	Report
2 Oct	19:00	Dynamo Moscow (Russia)	3–0	(Austria) SK Zadruga Aich/Dob	25–17	25–17	25–21			75–55	Report

=== Pool E ===
Pos	Team	Pld	W	L	Pts	SW	SL	SR	SPW	SPL	SPR	Qualification
1	(Switzerland) Lindaren Volley Amriswil (H)	2	2	0	5	6	3	2.000	190	180	1.056	Second round
2	(Belarus) Shakhtior Soligorsk	2	1	1	3	5	5	1.000	211	200	1.055	
3	(Belgium) Greenyard Maaseik	2	0	2	1	3	6	0.500	188	209	0.900	

(H) Tournament host

Date	Time		Score		Set 1	Set 2	Set 3	Set 4	Set 5	Total	Report
6 Oct	19:00	Shakhtior Soligorsk (Belarus)	2–3	(Switzerland) Lindaren Volley Amriswil	22–25	18–25	25–13	25–16	8–15	98–94	Report
7 Oct	19:00	Greenyard Maaseik (Belgium)	2–3	(Belarus) Shakhtior Soligorsk	25–23	18–25	25–23	24–26	14–16	106–113	Report
8 Oct	19:00	Lindaren Volley Amriswil (Switzerland)	3–1	(Belgium) Greenyard Maaseik	25–21	21–25	25–16	25–20		96–82	Report

=== Pool F ===
Pos	Team	Pld	W	L	Pts	SW	SL	SR	SPW	SPL	SPR	Qualification
1	(Italy) Itas Trentino (H)	2	2	0	6	6	0	MAX	150	105	1.429	Second round
2	(Serbia) Vojvodina Novi Sad	2	1	1	3	3	4	0.750	153	162	0.944	
3	(England) IBB Polonia London	2	0	2	0	1	6	0.167	135	171	0.789	

(H) Tournament host

Date	Time		Score		Set 1	Set 2	Set 3	Set 4	Set 5	Total	Report
29 Sep	20:30	IBB Polonia London (England)	0–3	(Italy) Itas Trentino	16–25	17–25	15–25			48–75	Report
30 Sep	20:30	Vojvodina Novi Sad (Serbia)	3–1	(England) IBB Polonia London	21–25	25–21	25–23	25–18		96–87	Report
1 Oct	20:30	Itas Trentino (Italy)	3–0	(Serbia) Vojvodina Novi Sad	25–19	25–20	25–18			75–57	Report

== Second round ==
- 6 teams compete in the second round
- The teams are split into 2 groups, each one featuring three teams
- Winner of each pool advance to the League round
- All times are local.

=== Pool G ===
Pos	Team	Pld	W	L	Pts	SW	SL	SR	SPW	SPL	SPR	Qualification
1	(Poland) Jastrzębski Węgiel	2	2	0	6	6	0	MAX	150	51	2.941	League round
2	(Romania) CSM Arcada Galați (H)	2	1	1	3	3	3	1.000	126	75	1.680	
3	(Hungary) Fino Kaposvár (Note: Fino Kaposvár withdrew from the competition due to the positive COVID-19 test results. Consequently, two remaining teams present at the tournament claimed a 3–0 forfeit victory (25–0, 25–0, 25–0).)	2	0	2	0	0	6	0.000	0	150	0.000	

(H) Tournament host
Notes:

Date	Time		Score		Set 1	Set 2	Set 3	Set 4	Set 5	Total	Report
12 Nov	19:00	Jastrzębski Węgiel (Poland)	3–0	(Romania) CSM Arcada Galați	25–18	25–16	25–17			75–51	Report

=== Pool H ===
Pos	Team	Pld	W	L	Pts	SW	SL	SR	SPW	SPL	SPR	Qualification
1	(Italy) Itas Trentino	2	2	0	6	6	0	MAX	150	106	1.415	League round
2	(Russia) Dynamo Moscow	2	1	1	3	3	3	1.000	122	134	0.910	
3	(Switzerland) Lindaren Volley Amriswil (H)	2	0	2	0	0	6	0.000	118	150	0.787	

(H) Tournament host

Date	Time		Score		Set 1	Set 2	Set 3	Set 4	Set 5	Total	Report
27 Oct	19:00	Lindaren Volley Amriswil (Switzerland)	0–3	(Russia) Dynamo Moscow	20–25	21–25	18–25			59–75	Report
28 Oct	19:00	Dynamo Moscow (Russia)	0–3	(Italy) Itas Trentino	18–25	13–25	16–25			47–75	Report
29 Oct	19:00	Itas Trentino (Italy)	3–0	(Switzerland) Lindaren Volley Amriswil	25–19	25–22	25–18			75–59	Report
