= Roberto Santilli =

Italian volleyball coach

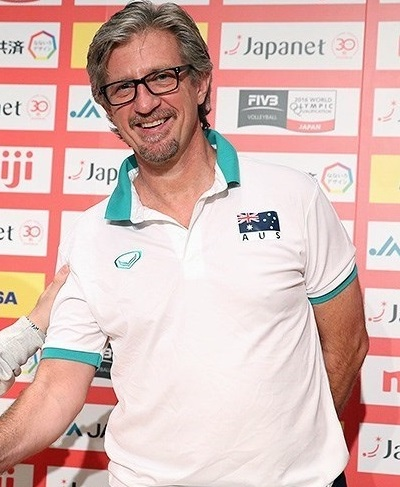

Personal information
- Born: 22 February 1965 (age 61); Rome, Italy

Coaching information
Previous teams coached
Years	Teams
1996–1998; 1998–1999; 1999–2000; 2000–2001; 2004–2005; 2005–2006; 2006–2007; 2007–2010; 2010–2013; 2013–2014; 2014; 2014–2015; 2015–2016; 2017–2018; 2018–2019; 2020–2021; 2021–2022; 2022	Gallo Gioia Del Colle; Boomerang Verona; Volley Lube (AC); Top Volley Latina; Top Volley Latina; Volley Callipo; Tiscali Cagliari; Jastrzębski Węgiel; Iskra Odintsovo; Top Volley Latina; Germany (AC); MKS Będzin; Australia; AZS Olsztyn; Jastrzębski Węgiel; Incheon Korean Air Jumbos; Ziraat Bankası Ankara; Projekt Warsaw

Volleyball information
- Position: Setter

Roberto Santilli (born 22 February 1965) is an Italian professional volleyball coach and former player.

== Career as coach ==
In 2007, Santilli moved to Jastrzębski Węgiel and coached his team to the 2008–09 PlusLiga bronze medal, and a silver one next season. Also, in 2010 they won the Polish Cup after beating Asseco Resovia.

In 2010, he left PlusLiga and joined the Russian team, Iskra Odintsovo.

Santilli was an assistant coach of Vital Heynen in the German national team, that won a bronze medal at the 2014 World Championship held in Poland. In 2015, he was named a new head coach of the Australian national volleyball team.

On 11 April 2017, he was appointed new head coach of the Polish team, Indykpol AZS Olsztyn.

For the 2020–21 season, Santilli became the first ever foreign head coach in the South Korean Volleyball League, by joining Incheon Korean Air Jumbos.

== Honours ==
=== Club ===
- CEV Challenge Cup
  - 2008–09 – with Jastrzębski Węgiel
- Domestic
  - 2009–10 Polish Cup, with Jastrzębski Węgiel
  - 2020–21 South Korean Championship, with Incheon Korean Air Jumbos
  - 2021–22 Turkish SuperCup, with Ziraat Bankası Ankara

=== Youth national team ===
- 2002 CEV U20 European Championship, with Italy U21
