= Jastrzębska Spółka Węglowa =

Jastrzębska Spółka Węglowa (JSW)
- Company type: Spółka Akcyjna
- Traded as: WSE: JSW
- Industry: Mining
- Founded: 1993
- Headquarters: Jastrzębie-Zdrój, Poland
- Products: coal
- Revenue: US$ 1.78 billion
- Net income: 409,400,000 euro (2018)
- Number of employees: 22,300 (2007)
- Website: www.jsw.pl

Jastrzębska Spółka Węglowa (JSW) S.A. is a large coal mining company from Jastrzębie-Zdrój, Poland, producing around 12 million tonnes of coal every year. The company has proven recoverable reserves of 503.4 million tonnes of coal.
