= 2022 Men's U20 Volleyball European Championship squads =

This article shows the roster of all participating teams at the 2022 Men's U20 Volleyball European Championship.

== Pool I ==
=== France ===
The following is the France roster in the 2022 Men's U20 Volleyball European Championship.

Head coach: Jocelyn Trillon

No.	Pos.	Name	Date of birth	Height	Spike	Block	Club
1	L	Mattéo Martino-Gauchi	3 September 2003 (aged 19)	1.90 m (6 ft 3 in)	315 cm (124 in)	300 cm (120 in)	Cannes
2	OH	Hilir Henno	12 September 2003 (aged 19)	2.02 m (6 ft 8 in)	350 cm (140 in)	330 cm (130 in)	Irvine University
3	S	Anatole Chaboissant	6 March 2003 (aged 19)	1.89 m (6 ft 2 in)	329 cm (130 in)	310 cm (120 in)	Nantes Rezé
4	OH	Nathan Canovas	16 May 2003 (aged 19)	1.96 m (6 ft 5 in)	350 cm (140 in)	326 cm (128 in)	Sennecey-le-Grand
6	MB	Simon Magnin	26 December 2003 (aged 18)	1.97 m (6 ft 6 in)	344 cm (135 in)	322 cm (127 in)	Nantes Rezé
7	MB	Axel Michel	10 October 2003 (aged 18)	2.00 m (6 ft 7 in)	332 cm (131 in)	326 cm (128 in)	Le Plessis Robinson
8	OH	Lohan Lefaivre	12 November 2003 (aged 18)	1.95 m (6 ft 5 in)	352 cm (139 in)	324 cm (128 in)	Saint-Jean d'illac
9	OP	Tristan Schleinger	15 August 2004 (aged 18)	2.07 m (6 ft 9 in)	352 cm (139 in)	328 cm (129 in)	Vincennes
10	OH	Alexandre Bouchez	25 October 2003 (aged 18)	2.00 m (6 ft 7 in)	355 cm (140 in)	334 cm (131 in)	Toulouse
12	S	Liam Varier	9 February 2003 (aged 19)	1.87 m (6 ft 2 in)	330 cm (130 in)	310 cm (120 in)	PUC
13	MB	Joris Seddik	4 January 2006 (aged 16)	2.07 m (6 ft 9 in)	353 cm (139 in)	321 cm (126 in)	Montpellier
15	OP	Henri Léon	15 December 2003 (aged 18)	2.02 m (6 ft 8 in)	356 cm (140 in)	332 cm (131 in)	Le Plessis Robinson
17	L	Lény Nomaï	23 March 2003 (aged 19)	1.86 m (6 ft 1 in)	320 cm (130 in)	315 cm (124 in)	Toulouse
18	OP	Nathan Feral	9 July 2003 (aged 19)	1.98 m (6 ft 6 in)	352 cm (139 in)	336 cm (132 in)	Toulouse

=== Italy ===
The following is the Italy roster in the 2022 Men's U20 Volleyball European Championship.

Head coach: Matteo Battocchio

No.	Pos.	Name	Date of birth	Height	Spike	Block	Club
1	MB	Ionut Alin Ambrose	13 August 2004 (aged 18)	2.10 m (6 ft 11 in)	337 cm (133 in)	322 cm (127 in)	Volley Lube
2	S	Mattia Boninfante	24 June 2004 (aged 18)	1.88 m (6 ft 2 in)	336 cm (132 in)	318 cm (125 in)	Prata di Pordenone
5	MB	Nicolò Volpe	11 February 2003 (aged 19)	1.99 m (6 ft 6 in)	333 cm (131 in)	318 cm (125 in)	Volley Tricolore
6	MB	Mattia Eccher	11 April 2003 (aged 19)	1.97 m (6 ft 6 in)	335 cm (132 in)	315 cm (124 in)	Diavoli Rosa
7	OP	Alessandro Alberto Bovolenta	27 May 2004 (aged 18)	2.02 m (6 ft 8 in)	338 cm (133 in)	320 cm (130 in)	Robur Ravenna
9	MB	Cosimo Balestra	30 November 2003 (aged 18)	2.00 m (6 ft 7 in)	344 cm (135 in)	321 cm (126 in)	Callipo Sport
10	OH	Gaetano Penna	20 December 2004 (aged 17)	2.05 m (6 ft 9 in)	352 cm (139 in)	325 cm (128 in)	Volley Lube
11	S	Alessandro Fanizza	11 December 2004 (aged 17)	1.90 m (6 ft 3 in)	313 cm (123 in)	301 cm (119 in)	Matervolley Castellana
13	L	Gabriele Laurenzano	12 June 2003 (aged 19)	1.76 m (5 ft 9 in)	306 cm (120 in)	286 cm (113 in)	Trentino Volley
14	OH	Mattia Orioli	23 March 2004 (aged 18)	1.98 m (6 ft 6 in)	344 cm (135 in)	325 cm (128 in)	Robur Ravenna
15	L	Matteo Staforini	23 May 2003 (aged 19)	1.90 m (6 ft 3 in)	313 cm (123 in)	300 cm (120 in)	Top Volley
17	OH	Luca Porro	9 May 2004 (aged 18)	1.91 m (6 ft 3 in)	333 cm (131 in)	316 cm (124 in)	Prata di Pordenone
18	OH	Riccardo Iervolino	22 January 2003 (aged 19)	1.97 m (6 ft 6 in)	345 cm (136 in)	327 cm (129 in)	Delta Volley Porto Viro
29	OH	Federico Roberti	19 March 2004 (aged 18)	1.91 m (6 ft 3 in)	347 cm (137 in)	329 cm (130 in)	Virtus Volley Fano

=== Poland ===
The following is the Poland roster in the 2022 Men's U20 Volleyball European Championship.

Head coach: Mateusz Grabda

No.	Pos.	Name	Date of birth	Height	Spike	Block	Club
1	MB	Jakub Majchrzak	13 May 2004 (aged 18)	2.06 m (6 ft 9 in)	356 cm (140 in)	340 cm (130 in)	SMS PZPS Spała
2	OH	Kamil Szymendera	30 April 2003 (aged 19)	1.91 m (6 ft 3 in)	335 cm (132 in)	308 cm (121 in)	Indykpol AZS Olsztyn
3	L	Maksymilian Kędzierski	13 March 2003 (aged 19)	1.79 m (5 ft 10 in)	311 cm (122 in)	284 cm (112 in)	Asseco Resovia
6	OH	Jakub Olszewski	30 January 2003 (aged 19)	1.90 m (6 ft 3 in)	325 cm (128 in)	305 cm (120 in)	Krispol Września
7	S	Kajetan Kubicki	9 February 2003 (aged 19)	1.90 m (6 ft 3 in)	335 cm (132 in)	305 cm (120 in)	Cuprum Lubin
8	OP	Tytus Nowik	10 January 2003 (aged 19)	1.92 m (6 ft 4 in)	341 cm (134 in)	312 cm (123 in)	Gwardia Wrocław
9	MB	Mateusz Kufka	8 November 2003 (aged 18)	2.03 m (6 ft 8 in)	342 cm (135 in)	317 cm (125 in)	KPS Siedlce
11	OH	Piotr Śliwka	3 June 2003 (aged 19)	1.88 m (6 ft 2 in)	330 cm (130 in)	300 cm (120 in)	BKS Visła Bydgoszcz
13	OH	Dominik Czerny	4 April 2003 (aged 19)	1.96 m (6 ft 5 in)	348 cm (137 in)	334 cm (131 in)	Cuprum Lubin
14	L	Kuba Hawryluk	8 September 2003 (aged 19)	1.79 m (5 ft 10 in)	313 cm (123 in)	290 cm (110 in)	Indykpol AZS Olsztyn
15	MB	Mateusz Nowak	29 February 2004 (aged 18)	2.08 m (6 ft 10 in)	335 cm (132 in)	315 cm (124 in)	SMS PZPS Spała
18	S	Damian Biliński	2 August 2003 (aged 19)	1.90 m (6 ft 3 in)	327 cm (129 in)	300 cm (120 in)	Norwid Częstochowa
21	OP	Kacper Ratajewski	26 June 2003 (aged 19)	2.00 m (6 ft 7 in)	331 cm (130 in)	308 cm (121 in)	Krispol Września
22	MB	Jakub Gaweł	28 March 2003 (aged 19)	2.02 m (6 ft 8 in)	334 cm (131 in)	310 cm (120 in)	ZAKSA Strzelce Opolskie

=== Serbia ===
The following is the Serbia roster in the 2022 Men's U20 Volleyball European Championship.

Head coach: Nedžad Osmankač

No.	Pos.	Name	Date of birth	Height	Spike	Block	Club
2	OH	Danilo Elezović	31 August 2003 (aged 19)	1.96 m (6 ft 5 in)	325 cm (128 in)	308 cm (121 in)	Vojvodina NS Seme
3	S	Strahinja Kljajić	7 May 2004 (aged 18)	1.87 m (6 ft 2 in)	311 cm (122 in)	303 cm (119 in)	Crvena Zvezda
7	S	Andrej Polomac	24 August 2004 (aged 18)	1.93 m (6 ft 4 in)	312 cm (123 in)	294 cm (116 in)	Takovo Gornji Milanovac
8	OH	Jovan Perović	21 January 2003 (aged 19)	2.00 m (6 ft 7 in)	340 cm (130 in)	325 cm (128 in)	Vojvodina NS Seme
9	L	Vukašin Ristić	24 October 2003 (aged 18)	1.88 m (6 ft 2 in)	305 cm (120 in)	293 cm (115 in)	Crvena Zvezda
10	OH	Stefan Ranković	23 June 2004 (aged 18)	1.99 m (6 ft 6 in)	330 cm (130 in)	315 cm (124 in)	Crvena Zvezda
11	MB	Matija Matić	1 August 2003 (aged 19)				Partizan
13	OP	Branko Kopitić	25 November 2003 (aged 18)	2.04 m (6 ft 8 in)	345 cm (136 in)	330 cm (130 in)	Vojvodina NS Seme
15	MB	Stefan Kokeza	15 April 2004 (aged 18)				Vojvodina NS Seme
16	OP	Luka Stanković	17 January 2005 (aged 17)				Vojvodina NS Seme
18	L	Lazar Jeremić	9 August 2004 (aged 18)	1.87 m (6 ft 2 in)	304 cm (120 in)	290 cm (110 in)	VGSK Veliko Gradište
20	MB	Veljko Ćulibrk	27 January 2003 (aged 19)	1.99 m (6 ft 6 in)	329 cm (130 in)	318 cm (125 in)	Vojvodina NS Seme
21	MB	Stefan Unković	24 May 2003 (aged 19)	2.06 m (6 ft 9 in)	323 cm (127 in)	309 cm (122 in)	VA 014 Valjevo
23	OH	Danilo Ilić	9 February 2003 (aged 19)	1.97 m (6 ft 6 in)	323 cm (127 in)	314 cm (124 in)	Crvena Zvezda

=== Slovakia ===
The following is the Slovakia roster in the 2022 Men's U20 Volleyball European Championship.

Head coach: Ivan Hiadlovský

No.	Pos.	Name	Date of birth	Height	Spike	Block	Club
1	MB	Samuel Kudla	19 September 2003 (aged 18)	2.02 m (6 ft 8 in)	333 cm (131 in)	318 cm (125 in)	ŠŠ volejbal Trenčín
4	MB	Branislav Hanúsek	18 January 2003 (aged 19)	2.08 m (6 ft 10 in)	345 cm (136 in)	325 cm (128 in)	Rieker UJS Komárno
5	OP	Erik Gulák	10 December 2004 (aged 17)	1.96 m (6 ft 5 in)	333 cm (131 in)	310 cm (120 in)	VK MIRAD UNIPO Prešov
6	L	Šimon Pati-Nagy	18 July 2003 (aged 19)	1.80 m (5 ft 11 in)	310 cm (120 in)	297 cm (117 in)	Rieker UJS Komárno
7	S	Lukáš Hlaváč	19 August 2005 (aged 17)	1.75 m (5 ft 9 in)	302 cm (119 in)	285 cm (112 in)	ŠVK Tatran Banská Bystrica
8	OH	Matej Turčáni	12 February 2003 (aged 19)	1.96 m (6 ft 5 in)	340 cm (130 in)	313 cm (123 in)	Rieker UJS Komárno
11	S	Patrik Kudra	26 March 2003 (aged 19)	1.81 m (5 ft 11 in)	318 cm (125 in)	293 cm (115 in)	Rieker UJS Komárno
12	OH	Martin Rendla	21 December 2004 (aged 17)	1.90 m (6 ft 3 in)	337 cm (133 in)	319 cm (126 in)	ŠVK Tatran Banská Bystrica
13	L	Šimon Červenák	5 November 2003 (aged 18)	1.83 m (6 ft 0 in)	320 cm (130 in)	302 cm (119 in)	VKP Bratislava
14	OP	Adam Kán	25 March 2003 (aged 19)	1.93 m (6 ft 4 in)	325 cm (128 in)	307 cm (121 in)	ŠVK Tatran Banská Bystrica
15	OH	Adrián Petruf	1 May 2003 (aged 19)	1.99 m (6 ft 6 in)	341 cm (134 in)	323 cm (127 in)	ŠŠ volejbal Trenčín
16	S	Ľuboš Skasko	3 October 2003 (aged 18)	1.87 m (6 ft 2 in)	317 cm (125 in)	311 cm (122 in)	TJ Slávia Svidník
18	MB	Tomáš Badáň	30 March 2005 (aged 17)	1.91 m (6 ft 3 in)	323 cm (127 in)	303 cm (119 in)	VolleyTeam Prievidza
20	OH	Branislav Skasko	4 November 2005 (aged 16)	1.93 m (6 ft 4 in)	330 cm (130 in)	310 cm (120 in)	TJ Slávia Svidník

=== Slovenia ===
The following is the Slovenia roster in the 2022 Men's U20 Volleyball European Championship.

Head coach: Jernej Rojc

No.	Pos.	Name	Date of birth	Height	Spike	Block	Club
1	OH	Vid Ranc	28 May 2004 (aged 18)				
2	OP	Jaka Prevorčnik	10 April 2003 (aged 19)	1.93 m (6 ft 4 in)	314 cm (124 in)	303 cm (119 in)	OK Črnuče
3	S	Nejc Kožar	1 October 2003 (aged 18)	1.89 m (6 ft 2 in)	310 cm (120 in)	300 cm (120 in)	MOK Krka Novo mesto
4	MB	Miha Fink	20 September 2003 (aged 18)	1.94 m (6 ft 4 in)	317 cm (125 in)	300 cm (120 in)	OK Maribor
5	OH	Dino Vinkovič	6 April 2003 (aged 19)	1.95 m (6 ft 5 in)	339 cm (133 in)	327 cm (129 in)	Calcit Volley
7	OP	Jurij Oman	8 September 2005 (aged 17)	1.99 m (6 ft 6 in)	317 cm (125 in)	291 cm (115 in)	OK Črnuče
8	OH	Rok Bračko	21 April 2004 (aged 18)	1.96 m (6 ft 5 in)	342 cm (135 in)	328 cm (129 in)	OK Maribor
9	OP	Nik Mujanovič	14 October 2004 (aged 17)	2.05 m (6 ft 9 in)	354 cm (139 in)	338 cm (133 in)	Calcit Volley
10	MB	Janž Janez Kržič	26 June 2003 (aged 19)	2.03 m (6 ft 8 in)	350 cm (140 in)	335 cm (132 in)	OK Maribor
12	L	Grega Okroglič	9 June 2004 (aged 18)	1.63 m (5 ft 4 in)	290 cm (110 in)	274 cm (108 in)	OK Salonit Anhovo
13	OH	Luka Marovt	13 January 2005 (aged 17)	1.93 m (6 ft 4 in)	317 cm (125 in)	300 cm (120 in)	OK Črnuče
14	MB	Amadej Snedec	20 December 2003 (aged 18)	1.90 m (6 ft 3 in)	313 cm (123 in)	300 cm (120 in)	Hiša na kolesih Triglav
15	L	Jan Karl Jančič	30 January 2003 (aged 19)				OK Črnuče
20	S	Nejc Najdič	5 May 2006 (aged 16)	1.86 m (6 ft 1 in)	303 cm (119 in)	282 cm (111 in)	OK Maribor

== Pool II ==
=== Belgium ===
The following is the Belgium roster in the 2022 Men's U20 Volleyball European Championship.

Head coach: Kris Eyckmans

No.	Pos.	Name	Date of birth	Height	Spike	Block	Club
1	S	Tijl Van Looveren	1 February 2003 (aged 19)	1.90 m (6 ft 3 in)	335 cm (132 in)	303 cm (119 in)	VBC Waremme
5	OP	Basil Dermaux	9 February 2003 (aged 19)	1.95 m (6 ft 5 in)	348 cm (137 in)	320 cm (130 in)	Volley Menen
7	OH	Ferre Reggers	18 July 2003 (aged 19)	2.02 m (6 ft 8 in)	353 cm (139 in)	325 cm (128 in)	Greenyard Maaseik
8	MB	Jasper Verhamme	18 March 2004 (aged 18)	1.96 m (6 ft 5 in)	337 cm (133 in)	306 cm (120 in)	Knack Roeselare
9	S	Antony Moga	10 March 2004 (aged 18)	1.94 m (6 ft 4 in)	325 cm (128 in)	300 cm (120 in)	
10	OH	Jippe Schroeven	4 March 2003 (aged 19)	1.98 m (6 ft 6 in)	355 cm (140 in)	333 cm (131 in)	VBC Waremme
11	OH	Sietse De Bruyn	8 March 2004 (aged 18)	1.93 m (6 ft 4 in)	334 cm (131 in)	316 cm (124 in)	Haasrode Leuven
12	L	Kobe Verwimp	13 January 2005 (aged 17)	1.81 m (5 ft 11 in)	328 cm (129 in)	299 cm (118 in)	
13	L	Sibren Peters	4 July 2003 (aged 19)	1.87 m (6 ft 2 in)	332 cm (131 in)	304 cm (120 in)	Haasrode Leuven
16	OH	Lennert Beelaert	19 June 2003 (aged 19)	2.00 m (6 ft 7 in)	347 cm (137 in)	319 cm (126 in)	Haasrode Leuven
17	MB	Simon Luka Vlahovic	24 October 2003 (aged 18)	1.94 m (6 ft 4 in)	343 cm (135 in)	319 cm (126 in)	Topsport School Vilvoorde
18	MB	Robbe Van Loon	18 November 2003 (aged 18)	2.00 m (6 ft 7 in)	334 cm (131 in)	315 cm (124 in)	VBC Waremme
20	S	Robbe Ponseele	25 January 2005 (aged 17)	1.81 m (5 ft 11 in)	322 cm (127 in)	293 cm (115 in)	
21	L	Matis Verwimp	29 April 2006 (aged 16)	1.72 m (5 ft 8 in)	310 cm (120 in)	287 cm (113 in)	

=== Bulgaria ===
The following is the Bulgaria roster in the 2022 Men's U20 Volleyball European Championship.

Head coach: Martin Stoev

No.	Pos.	Name	Date of birth	Height	Spike	Block	Club
1	S	Simeon Nikolov	24 November 2006 (aged 15)	1.96 m (6 ft 5 in)	328 cm (129 in)	315 cm (124 in)	Levski Sofia
2	MB	Boris Nachev	22 April 2004 (aged 18)	2.02 m (6 ft 8 in)	340 cm (130 in)	325 cm (128 in)	
3	MB	Lazar Bouchkov	12 May 2004 (aged 18)	1.99 m (6 ft 6 in)	346 cm (136 in)	325 cm (128 in)	Levski Sofia
4	OH	Erik Stoev	10 April 2003 (aged 19)	1.95 m (6 ft 5 in)	330 cm (130 in)	318 cm (125 in)	Slivnishki Geroi
6	OP	Venislav Antov	6 April 2004 (aged 18)	1.95 m (6 ft 5 in)	354 cm (139 in)	323 cm (127 in)	Levski Sofia
7	L	Aleksi Mitsev	9 October 2003 (aged 18)	1.88 m (6 ft 2 in)	302 cm (119 in)	280 cm (110 in)	
8	OP	Apostol Boyanov	11 June 2003 (aged 19)	2.00 m (6 ft 7 in)	330 cm (130 in)	320 cm (130 in)	Slavia Sofia
9	OH	Vladimir Garkov	2 October 2003 (aged 18)	1.98 m (6 ft 6 in)	343 cm (135 in)	325 cm (128 in)	Levski Sofia
10	S	Stoil Palev	21 May 2003 (aged 19)	1.88 m (6 ft 2 in)	300 cm (120 in)	290 cm (110 in)	Slivnishki Geroi
11	OH	Aleksandar Nikolov	30 November 2003 (aged 18)	2.03 m (6 ft 8 in)	352 cm (139 in)	333 cm (131 in)	Cucine Lube Civitanova
12	OP	Georgi Tatarov	10 May 2003 (aged 19)	1.95 m (6 ft 5 in)	340 cm (130 in)	320 cm (130 in)	Altekma SK
13	MB	Ivaylo Damyanov	11 January 2003 (aged 19)	2.02 m (6 ft 8 in)	335 cm (132 in)	325 cm (128 in)	Marek Union-Ivkoni
14	L	Georgi Mitov	27 July 2003 (aged 19)	1.85 m (6 ft 1 in)	305 cm (120 in)	290 cm (110 in)	Slivnishki Geroi
16	OH	Kaloyan Botev	28 October 2004 (aged 17)	1.81 m (5 ft 11 in)	318 cm (125 in)	300 cm (120 in)	Levski Sofia

=== Czech Republic ===
The following is the Czech Republic roster in the 2022 Men's U20 Volleyball European Championship.

Head coach: Jan Svoboda

No.	Pos.	Name	Date of birth	Height	Spike	Block	Club
2	L	Richard Struška	9 July 2004 (aged 18)	1.85 m (6 ft 1 in)	320 cm (130 in)	310 cm (120 in)	Blue Ostrava
3	S	Trung Hieu Hoang	5 April 2003 (aged 19)	1.77 m (5 ft 10 in)	314 cm (124 in)	306 cm (120 in)	Kolín
4	OH	Daniel Fabikovič	23 August 2004 (aged 18)	1.91 m (6 ft 3 in)	332 cm (131 in)	324 cm (128 in)	Blue Ostrava
8	OH	Jan Jirásek	11 March 2003 (aged 19)	1.95 m (6 ft 5 in)	338 cm (133 in)	328 cm (129 in)	Brno
9	MB	Jakub Klajmon	20 February 2003 (aged 19)	1.98 m (6 ft 6 in)	335 cm (132 in)	326 cm (128 in)	Brno
11	S	Šimon Bryknar	12 September 2003 (aged 19)	1.90 m (6 ft 3 in)	340 cm (130 in)	323 cm (127 in)	Liberec
12	OP	David Kollátor	15 January 2003 (aged 19)	1.97 m (6 ft 6 in)	352 cm (139 in)	338 cm (133 in)	Praha
14	OH	Matěj Pastrňák	25 November 2005 (aged 16)	1.99 m (6 ft 6 in)	338 cm (133 in)	320 cm (130 in)	Karlovarsko
15	MB	Tomáš Bukáček	18 June 2003 (aged 19)	1.95 m (6 ft 5 in)	350 cm (140 in)	340 cm (130 in)	Brno
16	L	Matěj Šálek	16 January 2003 (aged 19)	1.81 m (5 ft 11 in)	318 cm (125 in)	305 cm (120 in)	Praha
17	OP	Jakub Pelikán	30 September 2004 (aged 17)	1.89 m (6 ft 2 in)	334 cm (131 in)	322 cm (127 in)	VK Ostrava
18	OH	Jakub Ureš	18 February 2003 (aged 19)	1.93 m (6 ft 4 in)	332 cm (131 in)	324 cm (128 in)	Příbram
20	MB	Lukas Toth	8 June 2005 (aged 17)	1.97 m (6 ft 6 in)	331 cm (130 in)	315 cm (124 in)	České Budějovice

=== Finland ===
The following is the Finland roster in the 2022 Men's U20 Volleyball European Championship.

Head coach: Jouko Lindberg

No.	Pos.	Name	Date of birth	Height	Spike	Block	Club
1	MB	Antti Taponen	2 June 2004 (aged 18)	1.98 m (6 ft 6 in)	338 cm (133 in)	323 cm (127 in)	Rantaperkiön Isku
2	MB	Petteri Tyynismaa	5 August 2003 (aged 19)	2.03 m (6 ft 8 in)	345 cm (136 in)	330 cm (130 in)	Akaa-Volley
3	MB	Miika Haapaniemi	6 February 2004 (aged 18)	1.98 m (6 ft 6 in)	320 cm (130 in)	308 cm (121 in)	Hurrikaani Loimaa
4	OP	Roope Haapoja	8 September 2004 (aged 18)	1.89 m (6 ft 2 in)	336 cm (132 in)	321 cm (126 in)	Kuortane
7	L	Joonatan Salpakari	8 October 2003 (aged 18)	1.86 m (6 ft 1 in)	315 cm (124 in)	300 cm (120 in)	Charleston University
8	OH	Luka Marttila	30 June 2003 (aged 19)	1.80 m (5 ft 11 in)	310 cm (120 in)	295 cm (116 in)	Hurrikaani Loimaa
11	OH	Jiri Leinonen	4 April 2004 (aged 18)	1.91 m (6 ft 3 in)	318 cm (125 in)	305 cm (120 in)	VaLePa
12	OH	Joonas Kontio	18 May 2003 (aged 19)	1.87 m (6 ft 2 in)	325 cm (128 in)	310 cm (120 in)	TUTO Volley
14	OH	Nooa Marttila	3 July 2005 (aged 17)	1.84 m (6 ft 0 in)	327 cm (129 in)	312 cm (123 in)	Hurrikaani Loimaa
15	S	Leevi Väänänen	19 June 2003 (aged 19)	1.82 m (6 ft 0 in)	320 cm (130 in)	310 cm (120 in)	Kokkolan Tiikerit
16	MB	Aleksej Zhbankov	18 July 2003 (aged 19)	2.02 m (6 ft 8 in)	336 cm (132 in)	323 cm (127 in)	Savo Volley
17	OP	Veikka Lindqvist	13 November 2003 (aged 18)	2.01 m (6 ft 7 in)	349 cm (137 in)	333 cm (131 in)	Savo Volley
22	L	Paavo Ristiniemi	25 January 2005 (aged 17)	1.70 m (5 ft 7 in)	300 cm (120 in)	285 cm (112 in)	Kuortane
23	S	Oleksii Bulgyn	9 March 2003 (aged 19)	1.89 m (6 ft 2 in)	319 cm (126 in)	304 cm (120 in)	TUTO Volley

=== Greece ===
The following is the Greece roster in the 2022 Men's U20 Volleyball European Championship.

Head coach: Nikolaos Mouchlias

No.	Pos.	Name	Date of birth	Height	Spike	Block	Club
1	L	Eleftherios Folias	30 August 2003 (aged 19)	1.86 m (6 ft 1 in)	315 cm (124 in)	308 cm (121 in)	Panerythraikos
2	MB	Dimitrios Theodosis	27 June 2003 (aged 19)	1.98 m (6 ft 6 in)	335 cm (132 in)	315 cm (124 in)	AONS Milon
3	OP	Gerasimos Tzaras	8 April 2005 (aged 17)	2.01 m (6 ft 7 in)	342 cm (135 in)	320 cm (130 in)	AO Prevezas
4	OH	Alexandros Nanopoulos	9 September 2005 (aged 17)	1.88 m (6 ft 2 in)	312 cm (123 in)	300 cm (120 in)	AONS Milon
5	OH	Vasileios Konidis	23 March 2004 (aged 18)	1.90 m (6 ft 3 in)	305 cm (120 in)	295 cm (116 in)	AEK Athens
6	L	Panagiotis Sousounis	30 May 2003 (aged 19)	1.85 m (6 ft 1 in)	312 cm (123 in)	302 cm (119 in)	Panerythraikos
8	S	Nikolaos Christopoulos	3 June 2003 (aged 19)	1.83 m (6 ft 0 in)	288 cm (113 in)	268 cm (106 in)	Ionikos Nikaia Piraeus
10	OH	Nikolaos Kavarinos	22 December 2004 (aged 17)	1.88 m (6 ft 2 in)	315 cm (124 in)	305 cm (120 in)	AEK Athens
11	OP	Angelos Markou	1 July 2003 (aged 19)	1.93 m (6 ft 4 in)	325 cm (128 in)	310 cm (120 in)	Panathinaikos
12	OH	Spyridon Bakodimos	9 August 2004 (aged 18)	1.78 m (5 ft 10 in)	300 cm (120 in)	275 cm (108 in)	AO Flisvos
14	S	Apostolos Petsias	29 July 2003 (aged 19)	1.93 m (6 ft 4 in)	318 cm (125 in)	312 cm (123 in)	Olympiacos
15	MB	Georgios Marsellos	28 May 2003 (aged 19)	1.92 m (6 ft 4 in)	325 cm (128 in)	305 cm (120 in)	AO Flisvos
18	MB	Angelos-Theodoros Stathelos	26 July 2005 (aged 17)	2.00 m (6 ft 7 in)	320 cm (130 in)	310 cm (120 in)	ASA Evros Soufliou
19	MB	Konstantinos Sotiriou	15 May 2003 (aged 19)	1.92 m (6 ft 4 in)	324 cm (128 in)	313 cm (123 in)	Pigasos Polichnis

=== Portugal ===
The following is the Portugal roster in the 2022 Men's U20 Volleyball European Championship.

Head coach: Nuno Pereira

No.	Pos.	Name	Date of birth	Height	Spike	Block	Club
1	S	Gustavo Sá	29 July 2003 (aged 19)	1.79 m (5 ft 10 in)	300 cm (120 in)	280 cm (110 in)	Leixões SC
4	OH	André Pereira	10 September 2003 (aged 19)	1.88 m (6 ft 2 in)	305 cm (120 in)	282 cm (111 in)	Leixões SC
5	L	Gonçalo Gomes	28 March 2003 (aged 19)	1.80 m (5 ft 11 in)	292 cm (115 in)	277 cm (109 in)	AA São Mamede
6	MB	Eduardo Brito	10 May 2003 (aged 19)	2.00 m (6 ft 7 in)	303 cm (119 in)	289 cm (114 in)	SL Benfica
7	OH	Nuno Marques	6 June 2003 (aged 19)	1.90 m (6 ft 3 in)	311 cm (122 in)	294 cm (116 in)	VC Viana
8	OH	Manuel Figueiredo	10 September 2003 (aged 19)	1.89 m (6 ft 2 in)	307 cm (121 in)	289 cm (114 in)	VC Viana
10	OH	Tiago Matos	16 February 2004 (aged 18)	1.83 m (6 ft 0 in)	304 cm (120 in)	295 cm (116 in)	Castêlo da Maia GC
11	S	Bruno Dias	25 July 2003 (aged 19)	1.89 m (6 ft 2 in)	302 cm (119 in)	282 cm (111 in)	Esmoriz GC
12	L	Miguel Azenha	24 July 2004 (aged 18)	1.74 m (5 ft 9 in)	285 cm (112 in)	270 cm (110 in)	Castêlo da Maia GC
15	OH	Duarte Abecasis	6 November 2004 (aged 17)	1.96 m (6 ft 5 in)	310 cm (120 in)	295 cm (116 in)	GC Santo Tirso
16	MB	Santiago Pimentel	19 December 2003 (aged 18)	1.95 m (6 ft 5 in)	320 cm (130 in)	310 cm (120 in)	GC Santo Tirso
17	MB	Ricardo Martins	7 December 2003 (aged 18)	2.09 m (6 ft 10 in)	319 cm (126 in)	309 cm (122 in)	VC Viana
