= Aleksey Kuleshov =

Russian volleyball player (born 1979)

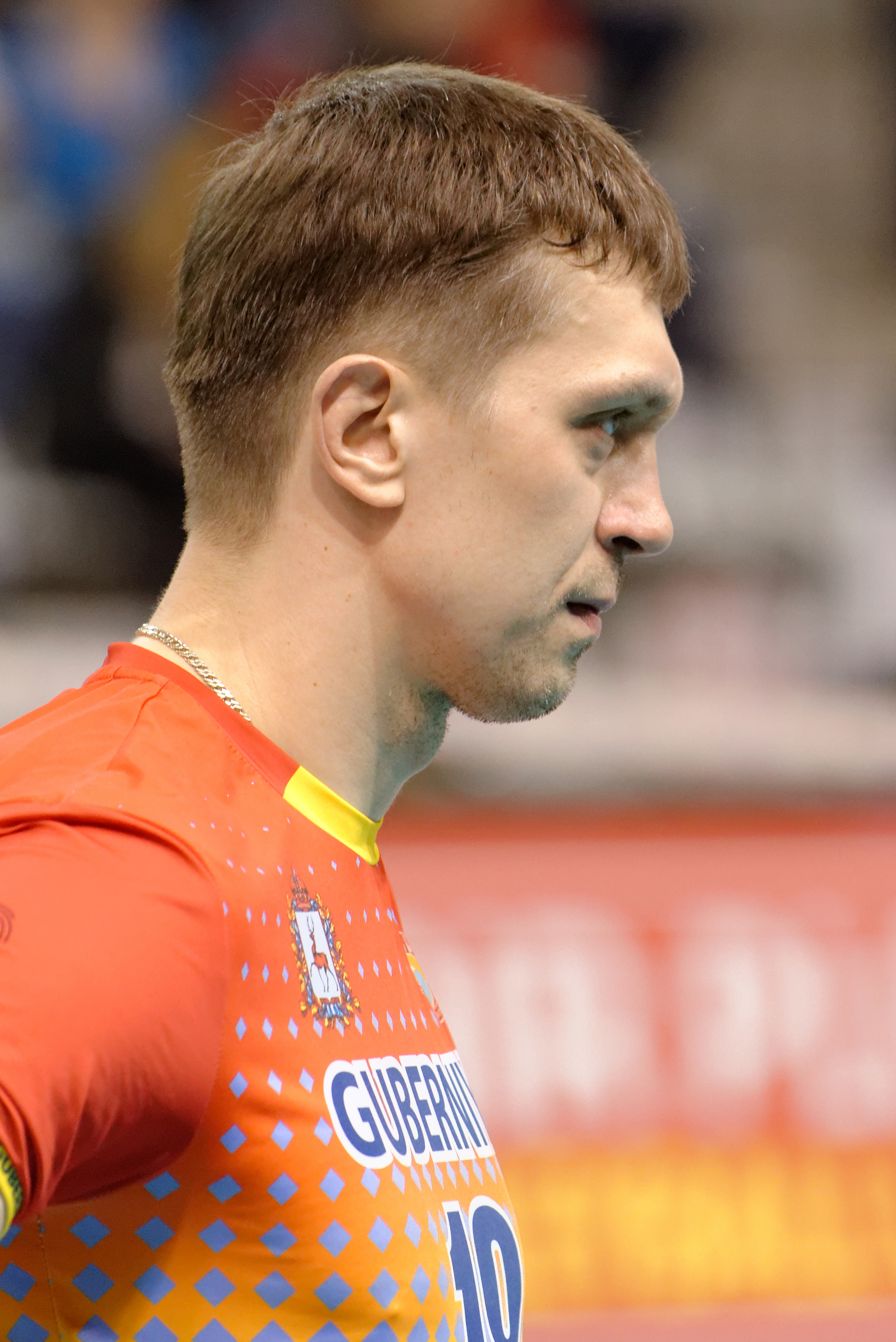
- Kuleshov in 2014

Personal information
- Full name: Aleksey Vladimirovich Kuleshov
- Nationality: Russian
- Born: 24 February 1979 (age 47); Fryazino, Russia
- Height: 2.06 m (6 ft 9 in)
- Weight: 96 kg (212 lb)
- Spike: 353 cm (139 in)
- Block: 344 cm (135 in)

Coaching information
Previous teams coached
| Years | Teams |
|---|---|
| 2019– | Dynamo Moscow (coach) |

Volleyball information
- Position: Middle blocker

Career
| Years | Teams |
|---|---|
| 1996–1997; 1997–2004; 2004–2007; 2007–2013; 2013–2015; 2015–2016 | Iskra Odintsovo; Belogorie Belgorod; Dynamo Moscow; Iskra Odintsovo; Guberniya Niz. Novgorod; Zenit Kazan |

National team
| 1998–2009 | Russia |
Honours
Men's volleyball
Representing Russia
Olympic Games
| Silver medal – second place | 2000 Sydney |
| Bronze medal – third place | 2004 Athens |
| Bronze medal – third place | 2008 Beijing |
World Cup
| Silver medal – second place | 2007 Japan |
European Championship
| Bronze medal – third place | 2001 Ostrava |
- Last updated: 22 January 2021

Aleksey Vladimirovich Kuleshov (Russian: Алексей Владимирович Кулешов; born 24 February 1979) is a former Russian volleyball player, a member of Russia men's national volleyball team. Currently he is a coach at Dynamo Moscow.

Kueshov was a member of the men's national team that won the silver medal at the 2000 Summer Olympics in Sydney, Australia. Playing as a middle-blocker, he won the 2002 Volleyball World League with Russia, followed by a bronze at the 2004 Summer Olympics.

== Sporting achievements ==
=== Clubs ===
==== CEV Champions League ====
- 2002/2003 - with Belogorie Belgorod
- 2003/2004 - with Belogorie Belgorod
- 2006/2007 - with Dynamo Moscow
- 2008/2009 - with Iskra Odintsovo
- 2015/2016 - with Zenit Kazan

==== CEV Cup ====
- 2009/2010 - with Iskra Odintsovo
- 2013/2014 - with Guberniya Nizhniy Novgorod

==== CEV Challenge Cup ====
- 2001/2002 - with Belogorie Belgorod

==== FIVB Club World Championship ====
- 2015 - with Zenit Kazan

==== National championships ====
- 1997/1998 Russian Championship, with Belogorie Belgorod
- 1998/1999 Russian Championship, with Belogorie Belgorod
- 1999/2000 Russian Championship, with Belogorie Belgorod
- 2001/2002 Russian Cup 2002, with Belogorie Belgorod
- 2001/2002 Russian Championship, with Belogorie Belgorod
- 2002/2003 Russian Cup 2003, with Belogorie Belgorod
- 2003/2004 Russian Cup 2004, with Belogorie Belgorod
- 2003/2004 Russian Championship, with Belogorie Belgorod
- 2004/2005 Russian Championship, with Dynamo Moscow
- 2005/2006 Russian Cup 2006, with Dynamo Moscow
- 2005/2006 Russian Championship, with Dynamo Moscow
- 2006/2007 Russian Championship, with Dynamo Moscow
- 2007/2008 Russian Championship, with Iskra Odintsovo
- 2008/2009 Russian Championship, with Iskra Odintsovo
- 2015/2016 Russian SuperCup 2015, with Zenit Kazan
- 2015/2016 Russian Cup 2016, with Zenit Kazan
- 2015/2016 Russian Championship, with Zenit Kazan

=== Individually ===
- 2002 FIVB World League - Best Blocker
- 2004 Russian Cup - Most Valuable Player
- 2004 Russian Championship - Most Valuable Player
- 2004 Olympic Games - Best Blocker
- 2006 FIVB World Championship - Best Blocker

Awards
| Preceded by (Brazil) Gustavo Endres | Best Blocker of FIVB World League; 2002 | Succeeded by (Serbia and Montenegro) Andrija Gerić |
| Preceded by (Serbia and Montenegro) Andrija Gerić | Best Blocker of Olympic Games; Athens 2004 | Succeeded by (Brazil) Gustavo Endres |
| Preceded by (Portugal) João José | Best Blocker of FIVB World Championship; 2006 | Succeeded by (Cuba) Robertlandy Simón |
