= 2007–08 CEV Champions League =

- League: CEV Champions League
- Sport: Volleyball
- Duration: 16 October 2007 – 30 March 2008
- Number of teams: 24

Finals
- Venue: (Poland) Łódź
- Champions: (Russia) Dynamo Tattransgaz Kazan
- Finals MVP: (United States) Clayton Stanley

CEV Champions League seasons
- ← 2006–07 2008–09 →

The 2007–08 CEV Champions League was the 49th edition of the highest level European volleyball club competition organised by the European Volleyball Confederation.

== Participating teams ==
Rank	Country	Number of teams	Teams		
1	Italy	3	Sisley Treviso	Copra Piacenza	Bre Banca Lannutti Cuneo
2	Greece	3	Iraklis Thessaloniki	Panathinaikos Athens	Olympiacos Piraeus
3	Russia	2	Dynamo Moscow	Dynamo Tattransgaz Kazan	
4	Poland	2	PGE Skra Bełchatów	Jastrzębski Węgiel	
5	Spain	2	Pòrtol Drac Palma Mallorca	Unicaja Arukasur Almería	
6	France	2	Paris Volley	AS Cannes	
7	Belgium	2	Knack Randstad Roeselare	Noliko Maaseik	
8	Austria	1	Hotvolleys Vienna		
9	Czech Republic	1	Jihostroj České Budějovice		
10	Serbia	1	NIS Vojvodina Novi Sad		
11	Germany	1	VfB Friedrichshafen		
12	Netherlands	1	Piet Zoomers/D Apeldoorn		
13	Turkey	1	Arkas İzmir		
15	Montenegro	1	Budućnost Podgorička Banka		
18	Slovenia	1	ACH Volley Bled		

== League round ==
24 teams will be drawn to 6 pools of 4 teams each. The 1st – 2nd ranked will qualify for the Play-off 12 teams. If the organizer of the final four is one of the above qualified teams in this case this team directly qualifies for the final four and the 3rd ranked team with the best score will also qualify for the Play-off 12 teams (replaces the organizer of the Final Four Tournament). The four next 3rd ranked teams with the best score will qualify for the Challenge Round of the CEV CUP. The remaining 3rd ranked teams and the 4th ranked teams are eliminated.

=== Pool A ===
Pos	Team	Pld	W	L	Pts	SW	SL	SR	SPW	SPL	SPR	Qualification
1	(France) AS Cannes	6	5	1	11	15	5	3.000	483	440	1.098	Playoffs
2	(Italy) Bre Banca Lannutti Cuneo	6	4	2	10	13	9	1.444	536	486	1.103	Playoffs
3	(Greece) Iraklis Thessaloniki	6	3	3	9	10	11	0.909	494	500	0.988	2007–08 CEV Cup
4	(Czech Republic) Jihostroj České Budějovice	6	0	6	6	5	18	0.278	469	556	0.844	

=== Pool B ===
Pos	Team	Pld	W	L	Pts	SW	SL	SR	SPW	SPL	SPR	Qualification
1	(Greece) Panathinaikos Athens	6	6	0	12	18	4	4.500	530	461	1.150	Playoffs
2	(Poland) PGE Skra Bełchatów (Note: Qualified as hosts) (H)	6	4	2	10	14	10	1.400	541	481	1.125	Final Four
3	(Montenegro) Budućnost Podgorička Banka	6	2	4	8	10	12	0.833	481	505	0.952	2007–08 CEV Cup
4	(Serbia) NIS Vojvodina Novi Sad	6	0	6	6	1	15	0.067	402	507	0.793	

(H) Host

=== Pool C ===
Pos	Team	Pld	W	L	Pts	SW	SL	SR	SPW	SPL	SPR	Qualification
1	(Russia) Dynamo Tattransgaz Kazan	6	5	1	11	17	9	1.889	597	541	1.104	Playoffs
2	(Germany) VfB Friedrichshafen	6	3	3	9	14	9	1.556	521	497	1.048	Playoffs
3	(Greece) Olympiacos Piraeus	6	3	3	9	11	12	0.917	504	499	1.010	2007–08 CEV Cup
4	(Spain) Unicaja Arukasur Almería	6	1	5	7	5	17	0.294	440	525	0.838	

=== Pool D ===
Pos	Team	Pld	W	L	Pts	SW	SL	SR	SPW	SPL	SPR	Qualification
1	(Italy) Copra Piacenza	6	5	1	11	16	7	2.286	545	509	1.071	Playoffs
2	(Spain) Pòrtol Drac Palma Mallorca	6	4	2	10	14	9	1.556	517	503	1.028	Playoffs
3	(Turkey) Arkas İzmir	6	2	4	8	9	14	0.643	501	514	0.975	
4	(Austria) Hotvolleys Vienna	6	1	5	7	7	16	0.438	495	536	0.924	

=== Pool E ===
Pos	Team	Pld	W	L	Pts	SW	SL	SR	SPW	SPL	SPR	Qualification
1	(Italy) Sisley Treviso	6	5	1	11	16	7	2.286	531	472	1.125	Playoffs
2	(Poland) Jastrzębski Węgiel	6	3	3	9	12	11	1.091	512	519	0.987	Playoffs
3	(Belgium) Knack Randstad Roeselare	6	3	3	9	11	11	1.000	491	496	0.990	Playoffs
4	(Netherlands) Piet Zoomers/D Apeldoorn	6	1	5	7	7	17	0.412	502	549	0.914	

=== Pool F ===
Pos	Team	Pld	W	L	Pts	SW	SL	SR	SPW	SPL	SPR	Qualification
1	(Russia) Dynamo Moscow	6	5	1	11	16	5	3.200	508	466	1.090	Playoffs
2	(France) Paris Volley	6	3	3	9	13	13	1.000	562	571	0.984	Playoffs
3	(Belgium) Noliko Maaseik	6	2	4	8	9	13	0.692	492	514	0.957	2007–08 CEV Cup
4	(Slovenia) ACH Volley Bled	6	2	4	8	8	15	0.533	502	537	0.935	

== Playoffs ==
=== Playoff 12 ===
Team 1	Agg.	Team 2	1st leg	2nd leg
Sisley Treviso (Italy)	6–0	(Spain) Pòrtol Drac Palma Mallorca	3–0	3–0
VfB Friedrichshafen (Germany)	4–3	(Russia) Dynamo Moscow	3–0	1–3
Panathinaikos Athens (Greece)	5–3	(Belgium) Knack Randstad Roeselare	3–0	2–3
Bre Banca Lannutti Cuneo (Italy)	3–6	(Italy) Copra Piacenza	2–3	1–3
Dynamo Tattransgaz Kazan (Russia)	5–3	(Poland) Jastrzębski Węgiel	3–0	2–3
Paris Volley (France)	3–6	(France) AS Cannes	1–3	2–3

==== First leg ====
Date	Time		Score		Set 1	Set 2	Set 3	Set 4	Set 5	Total
14 Feb	20:30	Sisley Treviso (Italy)	3–0	(Spain) Pòrtol Drac Palma Mallorca	25–20	25–23	25–13			75–56
13 Feb	20:00	VfB Friedrichshafen (Germany)	3–0	(Russia) Dynamo Moscow	25–20	25–20	26–24			76–64
12 Feb	19:00	Panathinaikos Athens (Greece)	3–0	(Belgium) Knack Randstad Roeselare	25–21	25–19	25–21			75–61
12 Feb	20:30	Bre Banca Lannutti Cuneo (Italy)	2–3	(Italy) Copra Piacenza	26–24	25–18	23–25	24–26	13–15	111–108
12 Feb	19:00	Dynamo Tattransgaz Kazan (Russia)	3–0	(Poland) Jastrzębski Węgiel	25–17	25–20	25–18			75–55
13 Feb	19:00	Paris Volley (France)	1–3	(France) AS Cannes	20–25	25–20	19–25	19–25		83–95

==== Second leg ====
Date	Time		Score		Set 1	Set 2	Set 3	Set 4	Set 5	Total
21 Feb	20:30	Pòrtol Drac Palma Mallorca (Spain)	0–3	(Italy) Sisley Treviso	18–25	24–26	24–26			66–77
20 Feb	19:00	Dynamo Moscow (Russia)	3–1	(Germany) VfB Friedrichshafen	18–25	25–23	25–18	25–22		93–88
20 Feb	20:30	Knack Randstad Roeselare (Belgium)	3–2	(Greece) Panathinaikos Athens	21–25	25–20	18–25	25–22	15–10	104–102
21 Feb	20:30	Copra Piacenza (Italy)	3–1	(Italy) Bre Banca Lannutti Cuneo	23–25	25–21	25–21	25–20		98–87
20 Feb	20:15	Jastrzębski Węgiel (Poland)	3–2	(Russia) Dynamo Tattransgaz Kazan	25–16	17–25	25–22	19–25	15–12	101–100
19 Feb	19:00	AS Cannes (France)	3–2	(France) Paris Volley	18–25	25–18	23–25	25–22	15–10	106–100

=== Playoff 6 ===
Team 1	Agg.	Team 2	1st leg	2nd leg	Setpoints
Sisley Treviso (Italy)	5–5	(Germany) VfB Friedrichshafen	2–3	3–2	210–207
Panathinaikos Athens (Greece)	3–6	(Italy) Copra Piacenza	1–3	2–3	
Dynamo Tattransgaz Kazan (Russia)	6–1	(France) AS Cannes	3–0	3–1	

==== First leg ====
Date	Time		Score		Set 1	Set 2	Set 3	Set 4	Set 5	Total
6 Mar	20:30	Sisley Treviso (Italy)	2–3	(Germany) VfB Friedrichshafen	16–25	22–25	25–14	25–22	11–15	99–101
4 Mar	20:30	Panathinaikos Athens (Greece)	1–3	(Italy) Copra Piacenza	25–18	21–25	23–25	18–25		87–93
4 Mar	19:00	Dynamo Tattransgaz Kazan (Russia)	3–0	(France) AS Cannes	25–21	26–24	28–26			79–71

==== Second leg ====
Date	Time		Score		Set 1	Set 2	Set 3	Set 4	Set 5	Total
13 Mar	20:00	VfB Friedrichshafen (Germany)	2–3	(Italy) Sisley Treviso	25–22	23–25	20–25	26–24	12–15	106–111
12 Mar	20:30	Copra Piacenza (Italy)	3–2	(Greece) Panathinaikos Athens	23–25	14–25	25–21	25–20	15–13	102–104
12 Mar	19:00	AS Cannes (France)	1–3	(Russia) Dynamo Tattransgaz Kazan	25–18	22–25	23–25	19–25		89–93

== Final Four ==
- Organizer: (Poland) PGE Skra Bełchatów
- Place: Łódź
- All times on 29 March are Central European Time (UTC+01:00) and all times on 30 March are Central European Summer Time (UTC+02:00).

Semifinals
29 March
(Russia) Dynamo Tattransgaz Kazan	3
(Poland) PGE Skra Bełchatów	2
29 March
(Italy) Copra Piacenza	3
(Italy) Sisley Treviso	1

Final
30 March
(Russia) Dynamo Tattransgaz Kazan	3
(Italy) Copra Piacenza	2
3rd place match
30 March
(Poland) PGE Skra Bełchatów	3
(Italy) Sisley Treviso	2

=== Semifinals ===
Date	Time		Score		Set 1	Set 2	Set 3	Set 4	Set 5	Total
29 Mar	15:15	Dynamo Tattransgaz Kazan (Russia)	3–2	(Poland) PGE Skra Bełchatów	25–21	25–16	18–25	20–25	15–12	103–99
29 Mar	18:15	Copra Piacenza (Italy)	3–1	(Italy) Sisley Treviso	22–25	28–26	25–23	25–20		100–94

=== 3rd place match ===
Date	Time		Score		Set 1	Set 2	Set 3	Set 4	Set 5	Total
30 Mar	11:30	PGE Skra Bełchatów (Poland)	3–2	(Italy) Sisley Treviso	25–22	25–21	23–25	18–25	15–13	106–106

=== Final ===
Date	Time		Score		Set 1	Set 2	Set 3	Set 4	Set 5	Total
30 Mar	14:30	Dynamo Tattransgaz Kazan (Russia)	3–2	(Italy) Copra Piacenza	19–25	26–24	18–25	25–17	15–10	103–101

== Final standings ==
Rank	Team
1st place, gold medalist(s)	(Russia) Dynamo Tattransgaz Kazan
2nd place, silver medalist(s)	(Italy) Copra Piacenza
3rd place, bronze medalist(s)	(Poland) PGE Skra Bełchatów
4	(Italy) Sisley Treviso

2007–08 CEV Champions League winners
(Russia)
Dynamo Tattransgaz Kazan
1st title

== Awards ==
- Most valuable player
  (United States) Clayton Stanley (Dynamo Tattransgaz Kazan)
- Best scorer
  (Italy) Hristo Zlatanov (Copra Piacenza)
- Best spiker
  (Poland) Mariusz Wlazły (PGE Skra Bełchatów)
- Best server
  (Brazil) João Paulo Bravo (Copra Piacenza)
- Best blocker
  (Russia) Aleksandr Bogomolov (Dynamo Tattransgaz Kazan)
- Best receiver
  (Italy) Alessandro Farina (Sisley Treviso)
- Best libero
  (Brazil) Sérgio Santos (Copra Piacenza)
- Best setter
  (Italy) Marco Meoni (Copra Piacenza)
