= Michiel Ahyi =

Dutch volleyball player (born 1998)

Personal information
- Full name: Michiel Ahyi
- Born: 28 July 1998 (age 28) Apeldoorn, Netherlands
- Height: 198 cm (6 ft 6 in)
- Weight: 86 kg (190 lb)

Volleyball information
- Position: Outside hitter
- Current team: (Germany) Helios Grizzlies Giesen
- Number: 6

Career
- Years: Team
- 2017–2018 2018-2020 2020-2023 2023-2024 2024 2024-2025 2025-: (Belgium) VC Maaseik (Belgium) Caruur Volley Gent (Belgium) Knack Roeselare (Germany) Helios Grizzlies Giesen (South Korea) Seoul Woori Card Woori Won (Germany) Helios Grizzlies Giesen (South Korea) Daejeon Samsung Fire Bluefangs
Honours
(silver) (European Union) CEV Cup: 2023
(gold) Belgium Men's Volleyball League: 2021, 2022, 2023
(gold) Cup of Belgium: 2021, 2023

Michiel Ahyi (Apeldoorn, 28 July 1998) is a Dutch volleyball player.

Ahyi played for the Talent Team Papendal (2014–2017), VC Maaseik (2017–2018), and Caruur Volley Gent (2018–2020). From 2020 to 2023, Ahyi played in the first team of the Belgian Knack Roeselare. Ahyi became national champions in the highest national division with the team in all three seasons.

Since the 2023/2024 season, Ahyi has played as a main striker for Helios Grizzlies Giesen in the German Deutsche Volleyball-Bundesliga.
