= Vital Heynen =

Belgian volleyball player and coach (born 1969)

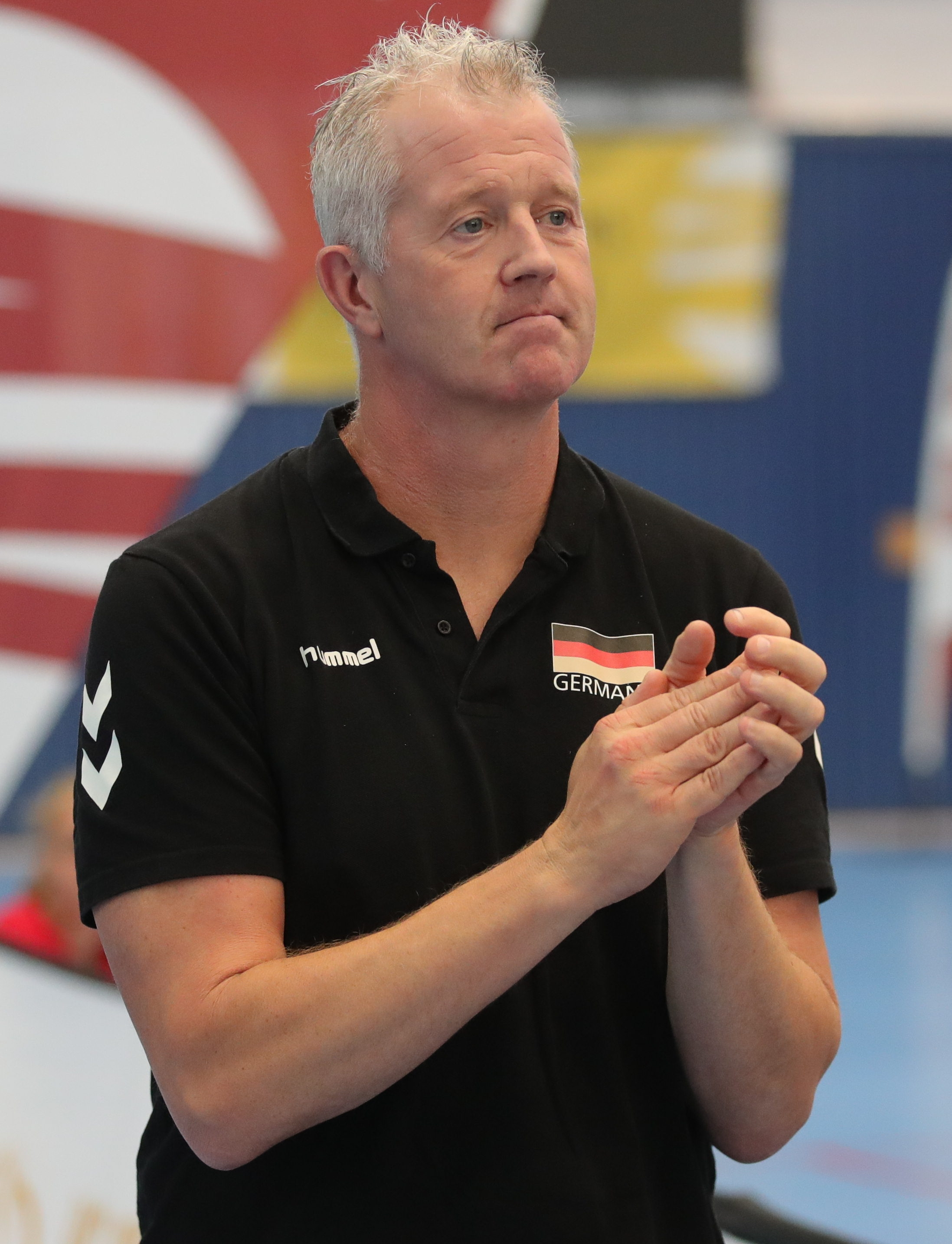
- Heynen in 2022

Personal information
- Born: 12 June 1969 (age 57) Maaseik, Belgium
- Height: 1.91 m (6 ft 3 in)

Coaching information
- Current team: China
- Previous teams coached
- Years: Teams
- 2006–2012 2012–2016 2012–2013 2013–2015 2015–2016 2016–2019 2017–2018 2018–2021 2019–2021 2022–2023 2022–2024 2024–: Noliko Maaseik; Germany; Ziraat Bankası Ankara; Transfer Bydgoszcz; Tours VB; VfB Friedrichshafen; Belgium; Poland; Sir Safety Perugia; Germany (W); Nilüfer Belediyespor; China

Volleyball information
- Position: Setter

Career
- Years: Team
- 1995–2005: Noliko Maaseik
Honours
Men's volleyball
Head coach Germany
FIVB World Championship
Bronze medal – third place	2014 Poland
Head coach Poland
FIVB World Championship
Gold medal – first place	2018 Bulgaria/Italy
FIVB World Cup
Silver medal – second place	2019 Japan
FIVB Nations League
Silver medal – second place	2021 Rimini
Bronze medal – third place	2019 Chicago
CEV European Championship
Bronze medal – third place	2019 Belgium/France/Netherlands/Slovenia
Bronze medal – third place	2021 Poland/Czechia/Estonia/Finland
Head coach China
FIVB Challenger Cup
Gold medal – first place	2024 Linyi

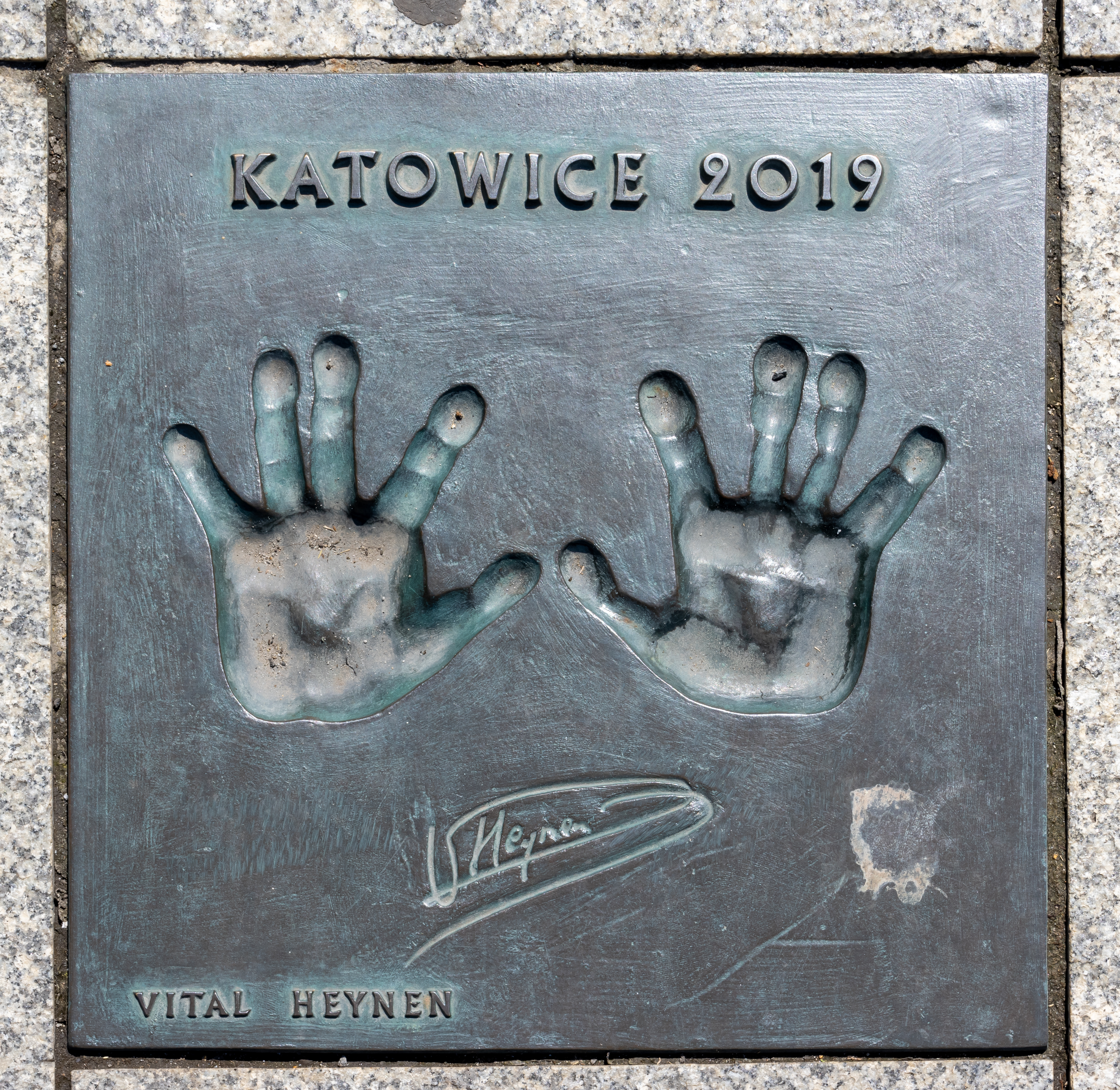
Hand prints and signature at the Avenue of Volleyball Stars, Katowice

Vital Heynen (born 12 June 1969) is a Belgian professional volleyball coach and former player. Since 2024, he has served as head coach for the China national team.

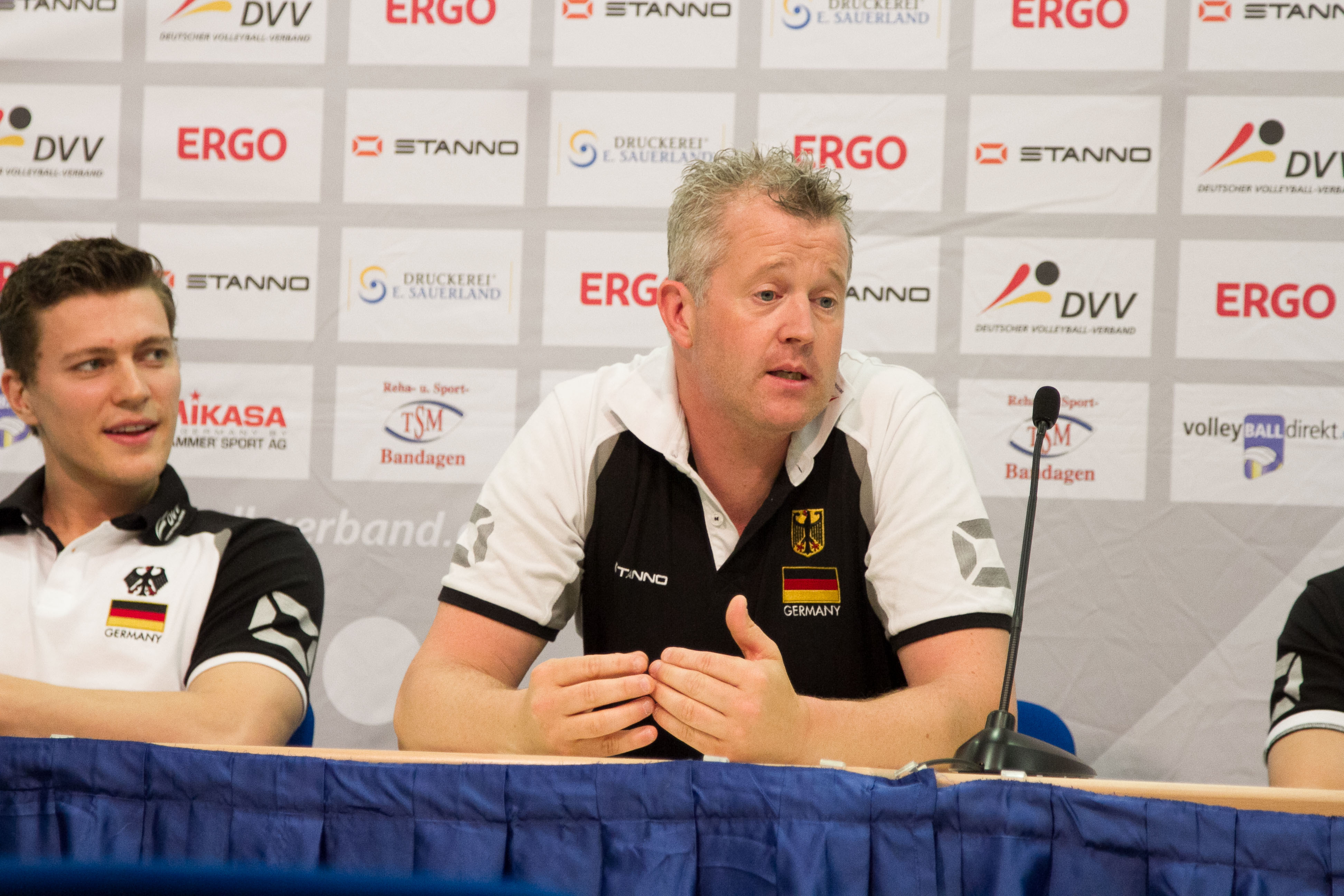
Heynen coaching Germany during the 2014 World League.

== Career as coach ==
Heynen started out his career as a volleyball coach in his hometown club Noliko Maaseik. In 2005 he became assistant coach and a year later - a head coach. During his six-year work at the club, his team won four Belgian Championships, five Belgian Cups and four Supercups. Additionally Heynen was twice named Belgian Coach of the Year in 2009 and 2011. In 2012 he left his hometown club and joined Turkish club Ziraat Bankası Ankara, which he coached in the season 2012/2013. In December 2013 he was named a new coach of Transfer Bydgoszcz, PlusLiga.

In February 2012 he became a head coach of Germany national team. At the World Championship 2014 his team beat France in 3rd place match and won bronze medal. In 2017 he took over Belgian national team. On 7 February 2018 Heynen was chosen as the new head coach of Poland men's national volleyball team. At the World Championship 2018 in Italy, Poland led by Heynen beat Brazil in the final, defended the World Championship 2014 title, and achieved 3rd World Champion title in total. In 2019 Heynen coached Poland to the European Championship 2019 bronze medal by beating France in 3rd place match and losing only to Slovenia in the semifinal. At the FIVB World Cup 2019 his team lost only against USA and Brazil and eventually was placed 2nd in the competition, winning the silver medal. In November, 2019 he became a head coach of Sir Safety Conad Perugia. In the 2019/2020 season Sir Safety Perugia coached by Heynen achieved the Italian SuperCup after defeating Modena Volley in the final.

== Honours ==
=== As a player ===
- CEV European Champions Cup
  - 1996–97 – with Noliko Maaseik
  - 1998–99 – with Noliko Maaseik
- Domestic
  - 1995–96 Belgian Championship, with Noliko Maaseik
  - 1996–97 Belgian SuperCup, with Noliko Maaseik
  - 1996–97 Belgian Cup, with Noliko Maaseik
  - 1996–97 Belgian Championship, with Noliko Maaseik
  - 1997–98 Belgian SuperCup, with Noliko Maaseik
  - 1997–98 Belgian Cup, with Noliko Maaseik
  - 1997–98 Belgian Championship, with Noliko Maaseik
  - 1998–99 Belgian SuperCup, with Noliko Maaseik
  - 1998–99 Belgian Cup, with Noliko Maaseik
  - 1998–99 Belgian Championship, with Noliko Maaseik
  - 1999–2000 Belgian SuperCup, with Noliko Maaseik
  - 2000–01 Belgian SuperCup, with Noliko Maaseik
  - 2000–01 Belgian Cup, with Noliko Maaseik
  - 2000–01 Belgian Championship, with Noliko Maaseik
  - 2001–02 Belgian SuperCup, with Noliko Maaseik
  - 2001–02 Belgian Cup, with Noliko Maaseik
  - 2001–02 Belgian Championship, with Noliko Maaseik
  - 2002–03 Belgian SuperCup, with Noliko Maaseik
  - 2002–03 Belgian Cup, with Noliko Maaseik
  - 2002–03 Belgian Championship, with Noliko Maaseik
  - 2003–04 Belgian Cup, with Noliko Maaseik
  - 2003–04 Belgian Championship, with Noliko Maaseik

=== As a coach ===
- CEV Cup
  - 2007–08 – with Noliko Maaseik
- Domestic
  - 2006–07 Belgian Cup, with Noliko Maaseik
  - 2007–08 Belgian SuperCup, with Noliko Maaseik
  - 2007–08 Belgian Cup, with Noliko Maaseik
  - 2007–08 Belgian Championship, with Noliko Maaseik
  - 2008–09 Belgian SuperCup, with Noliko Maaseik
  - 2008–09 Belgian Cup, with Noliko Maaseik
  - 2008–09 Belgian Championship, with Noliko Maaseik
  - 2009–10 Belgian SuperCup, with Noliko Maaseik
  - 2009–10 Belgian Cup, with Noliko Maaseik
  - 2010–11 Belgian Championship, with Noliko Maaseik
  - 2011–12 Belgian SuperCup, with Noliko Maaseik
  - 2011–12 Belgian Cup, with Noliko Maaseik
  - 2011–12 Belgian Championship, with Noliko Maaseik
  - 2014–15 French SuperCup, with Tours VB
  - 2015–16 German SuperCup, with VfB Friedrichshafen
  - 2015–16 German Cup, with VfB Friedrichshafen
  - 2016–17 German SuperCup, with VfB Friedrichshafen
  - 2016–17 German Cup, with VfB Friedrichshafen
  - 2017–18 German SuperCup, with VfB Friedrichshafen
  - 2017–18 German Cup, with VfB Friedrichshafen
  - 2018–19 German SuperCup, with VfB Friedrichshafen
  - 2018–19 German Cup, with VfB Friedrichshafen
  - 2019–20 Italian SuperCup, with Sir Safety Perugia
  - 2020–21 Italian SuperCup, with Sir Safety Perugia

Sporting positions
Preceded by (Italy) Ferdinando De Giorgi	Head coach of Poland; 2018–2021	Succeeded by (Serbia) Nikola Grbić
Preceded by (Belgium) Dominique Baeyens	Head coach of Belgium; 2017–2018	Succeeded by (Italy) Andrea Anastasi
