= Antoine Cornil =

Belgian volleyball player (born 1992)

Personal information
- Nationality: Belgian
- Born: 2 February 1998 (age 28)
- Height: 1.97 cm (1 in)

Volleyball information
- Position: Outside spiker
- Current club: (France) AMVB Amiens Métropole Volley Ball
- Number: 11

Career
Years	Teams
2008-2017; 2017-2020; 2020-	(Belgium) Skill VC Tournai (Belgium) Knack Randstad Roeselare (France) AMVB Amiens Métropole Volley Ball

Antoine Cornil (born 2 February 1998) is a Belgian volleyball player, a member of the club Knack Randstad Roeselare.

== Sporting achievements ==
=== Clubs ===
Belgian Cup:

- 2018, 2019

Belgium Championship:

- 2018, 2019

Belgian SuperCup:

- 2018
