= 2002–03 CEV Champions League =

- League: CEV Champions League
- Sport: Volleyball
- Duration: 3 December 2002 – 23 March 2003
- Number of teams: 20

Finals
- Venue: (Italy) Milan
- Champions: (Russia) Lokomotiv Belgorod

CEV Champions League seasons
- ← 2001–02 2003–04 →

The 2002–03 CEV Champions League was the 44th edition of the highest level European volleyball club competition organised by the European Volleyball Confederation.

== League round ==
=== Pool A ===
Pos	Team	Pld	W	L	Pts	SW	SL	SR	SPW	SPL	SPR	Qualification
1	(Belgium) Noliko Maaseik	6	6	0	12	18	7	2.571	566	490	1.155	4th Finals
2	(Bulgaria) Levski Siconco Sofia	6	3	3	9	12	12	1.000	515	521	0.988	
3	(Greece) Olympiacos Piraeus	6	2	4	8	12	15	0.800	581	589	0.986	
4	(Poland) AZS Częstochowa	6	1	5	7	8	16	0.500	501	563	0.890	

=== Pool B ===
Pos	Team	Pld	W	L	Pts	SW	SL	SR	SPW	SPL	SPR	Qualification
1	(Italy) Kerakoll Modena	6	6	0	12	18	2	9.000	486	406	1.197	4th Finals
2	(Belgium) Knack Roeselare	6	3	3	9	12	11	1.091	522	497	1.050	
3	(Spain) Unicaja Almería	6	2	4	8	6	13	0.462	401	465	0.862	
4	(Turkey) Erdemirspor Ereğli	6	1	5	7	5	15	0.333	436	477	0.914	

=== Pool C ===
Pos	Team	Pld	W	L	Pts	SW	SL	SR	SPW	SPL	SPR	Qualification
1	(France) Paris Volley	6	6	0	12	18	4	4.500	513	443	1.158	4th Finals
2	(Germany) VfB Friedrichshafen	6	4	2	10	15	10	1.500	561	540	1.039	4th Finals
3	(Austria) Hotvolleys Vienna	6	1	5	7	7	16	0.438	524	538	0.974	
4	(Serbia and Montenegro) Budućnost Podgoriča Bank	6	1	5	7	6	16	0.375	451	528	0.854	

=== Pool D ===
Pos	Team	Pld	W	L	Pts	SW	SL	SR	SPW	SPL	SPR	Qualification
1	(Russia) Lokomotiv Belgorod	6	5	1	11	17	7	2.429	562	465	1.209	4th Finals
2	(France) Stade Poitevin Poitiers	6	4	2	10	14	13	1.077	591	612	0.966	4th Finals
3	(Greece) Iraklis Thessaloniki	6	2	4	8	10	13	0.769	507	521	0.973	
4	(Turkey) SSK Ankara	6	1	5	7	8	16	0.500	516	578	0.893	

=== Pool E ===
Pos	Team	Pld	W	L	Pts	SW	SL	SR	SPW	SPL	SPR	Qualification
1	(Poland) Mostostal Azoty Kędzierzyn-Koźle	6	5	1	11	15	7	2.143	509	451	1.129	4th Finals
2	(Russia) Luzhniki Moscow	6	4	2	10	12	9	1.333	485	452	1.073	4th Finals
3	(Italy) Noicom Cuneo	6	3	3	9	15	11	1.364	569	563	1.011	
4	(Spain) Telecom Málaga	6	0	6	6	3	18	0.167	416	513	0.811	

== 4th Finals ==
Team 1	Agg.	Team 2	1st leg	2nd leg
Kerakoll Modena (Italy)	5–4	(Germany) VfB Friedrichshafen	3–1	2–3
Mostostal Azoty KK (Poland)	4–3	(Belgium) Noliko Maaseik	3–0	1–3
Stade Poitevin Poitiers (France)	3–5	(France) Paris Volley	3–2	0–3
Luzhniki Moscow (Russia)	2–6	(Russia) Lokomotiv Belgorod	1–3	1–3

=== First leg ===
Date	Time		Score		Set 1	Set 2	Set 3	Set 4	Set 5	Total
12 Feb	20:30	Kerakoll Modena (Italy)	3–1	(Germany) VfB Friedrichshafen	21–25	25–21	25–15	25–17		96–78
11 Feb	18:00	Mostostal Azoty KK (Poland)	3–0	(Belgium) Noliko Maaseik	25–19	27–25	25–19			77–63
11 Feb	20:00	Stade Poitevin Poitiers (France)	3–2	(France) Paris Volley	25–22	25–19	18–25	18–25	17–15	103–106
13 Feb	19:00	Luzhniki Moscow (Russia)	1–3	(Russia) Lokomotiv Belgorod	25–20	13–25	17–25	20–25		75–95

=== Second leg ===
Date	Time		Score		Set 1	Set 2	Set 3	Set 4	Set 5	Total
19 Feb	18:30	VfB Friedrichshafen (Germany)	3–2	(Italy) Kerakoll Modena	25–23	20–25	21–25	25–20	16–14	107–107
19 Feb	20:30	Noliko Maaseik (Belgium)	3–1	(Poland) Mostostal Azoty KK	21–25	25–17	25–19	25–21		96–82
18 Mar	20:30	Paris Volley (France)	3–0	(France) Stade Poitevin Poitiers	25–21	25–21	25–23			75–65
18 Mar	19:00	Lokomotiv Belgorod (Russia)	3–1	(Russia) Luzhniki Moscow	25–11	25–23	17–25	25–19		92–78

== Final Four ==
- Place: (Italy) Milan
- All times are Central European Time (UTC+01:00).

Semifinals
22 March
(Italy) Kerakoll Modena	3
(Poland) Mostostal Azoty KK	1
22 March
(France) Paris Volley	2
(Russia) Lokomotiv Belgorod	3

Final
23 March
(Italy) Kerakoll Modena	0
(Russia) Lokomotiv Belgorod	3
3rd place match
23 March
(Poland) Mostostal Azoty KK	3
(France) Paris Volley	0

=== Semifinals ===
Date	Time		Score		Set 1	Set 2	Set 3	Set 4	Set 5	Total
22 Mar	17:30	Kerakoll Modena (Italy)	3–1	(Poland) Mostostal Azoty KK	32–30	23–25	25–15	25–14		105–84
22 Mar	14:30	Paris Volley (France)	2–3	(Russia) Lokomotiv Belgorod	32–30	23–25	26–24	21–25	10–15	112–119

=== 3rd place match ===
Date	Time		Score		Set 1	Set 2	Set 3	Set 4	Set 5	Total
23 Mar	15:00	Mostostal Azoty KK (Poland)	3–0	(France) Paris Volley	26–24	28–26	25–21			79–71

=== Final ===
Date	Time		Score		Set 1	Set 2	Set 3	Set 4	Set 5	Total
23 Mar	18:00	Kerakoll Modena (Italy)	0–3	(Russia) Lokomotiv Belgorod	22–25	24–26	23–25			69–76

== Final standings ==
Rank	Team
1st place, gold medalist(s)	(Russia) Lokomotiv Belgorod
2nd place, silver medalist(s)	(Italy) Kerakoll Modena
3rd place, bronze medalist(s)	(Poland) Mostostal Azoty Kędzierzyn-Koźle
4	(France) Paris Volley

2002–03 CEV Champions League winners
(Russia)
Lokomotiv Belgorod
1st title
