= 2003–04 CEV Champions League =

- League: CEV Champions League
- Sport: Volleyball
- Duration: 9 December 2003 – 28 March 2004
- Number of teams: 20

Finals
- Venue: (Russia) Belgorod
- Champions: (Russia) Lokomotiv Belgorod

CEV Champions League seasons
- ← 2002–03 2004–05 →

The 2003–04 CEV Champions League was the 45th edition of the highest level European volleyball club competition organised by the European Volleyball Confederation.

== League round ==
=== Pool A ===
Pos	Team	Pld	W	L	Pts	SW	SL	SR	SPW	SPL	SPR	Qualification
1	(Italy) Sisley Treviso	6	6	0	12	18	5	3.600	549	454	1.209	Playoffs
2	(Greece) Olympiacos Piraeus	6	4	2	10	12	10	1.200	501	480	1.044	
3	(Poland) Pamapol AZS Częstochowa	6	1	5	7	9	15	0.600	497	528	0.941	
4	(Germany) SCC Berlin	6	1	5	7	8	17	0.471	511	596	0.857	

=== Pool B ===
Pos	Team	Pld	W	L	Pts	SW	SL	SR	SPW	SPL	SPR	Qualification
1	(France) Paris Volley	6	6	0	12	18	5	3.600	553	470	1.177	Playoffs
2	(Belgium) Knack Roeselare	6	4	2	10	15	7	2.143	516	487	1.060	
3	(Spain) Unicaja Almería	6	2	4	8	7	16	0.438	488	530	0.921	
4	(Serbia and Montenegro) Crvena Zvezda Beograd	6	0	6	6	6	18	0.333	509	579	0.879	

=== Pool C ===
Pos	Team	Pld	W	L	Pts	SW	SL	SR	SPW	SPL	SPR	Qualification
1	(Greece) Iraklis Thessaloniki	6	5	1	11	16	7	2.286	551	479	1.150	Playoffs
2	(Russia) Lokomotiv Belgorod (Note: Qualified as hosts) (H)	6	5	1	11	15	7	2.143	496	465	1.067	Final Four
3	(Italy) Lube Macerata	6	2	4	8	12	13	0.923	539	546	0.987	
4	(Czech Republic) Dukla Liberec	6	0	6	6	2	18	0.111	411	507	0.811	

(H) Host

=== Pool D ===
Pos	Team	Pld	W	L	Pts	SW	SL	SR	SPW	SPL	SPR	Qualification
1	(France) Tours VB	6	5	1	11	16	6	2.667	516	464	1.112	Playoffs
2	(Russia) Iskra Odintsovo	6	5	1	11	16	7	2.286	551	481	1.146	Playoffs
3	(Germany) VfB Friedrichshafen	6	2	4	8	11	13	0.846	527	541	0.974	
4	(Estonia) ESS Falck Pärnu	6	0	6	6	1	18	0.056	365	473	0.772	

=== Pool E ===
Pos	Team	Pld	W	L	Pts	SW	SL	SR	SPW	SPL	SPR	Qualification
1	(Belgium) Noliko Maaseik	6	6	0	12	18	2	9.000	498	395	1.261	Playoffs
2	(Austria) Hotvolleys Vienna	6	2	4	8	10	13	0.769	495	522	0.948	
3	(Bulgaria) Levski Siconco Sofia	6	2	4	8	8	14	0.571	473	517	0.915	
4	(Poland) Mostostal Azoty Kędzierzyn-Koźle	6	2	4	8	8	15	0.533	512	544	0.941	

== Playoffs ==
=== Playoff 6 ===
Team 1	Agg.	Team 2	1st leg	2nd leg
Paris Volley (France)	3–4	(Greece) Iraklis Thessaloniki	3–1	0–3
Noliko Maaseik (Belgium)	0–6	(Russia) Iskra Odintsovo	0–3	0–3
Sisley Treviso (Italy)	4–5	(France) Tours VB	1–3	3–2

==== First leg ====
Date	Time		Score		Set 1	Set 2	Set 3	Set 4	Set 5	Total
25 Feb	19:30	Paris Volley (France)	3–1	(Greece) Iraklis Thessaloniki	25–22	22–25	25–16	26–24		98–87
25 Feb	20:30	Noliko Maaseik (Belgium)	0–3	(Russia) Iskra Odintsovo	20–25	20–25	23–25			63–75
26 Feb	20:30	Sisley Treviso (Italy)	1–3	(France) Tours VB	21–25	28–26	21–25	21–25		91–101

==== Second leg ====
Date	Time		Score		Set 1	Set 2	Set 3	Set 4	Set 5	Total
3 Mar	18:30	Iraklis Thessaloniki (Greece)	3–0	(France) Paris Volley	25–22	25–14	25–23			75–59
3 Mar	19:00	Iskra Odintsovo (Russia)	3–0	(Belgium) Noliko Maaseik	25–20	29–27	25–22			79–69
3 Mar	20:30	Tours VB (France)	2–3	(Italy) Sisley Treviso	21–25	19–25	25–21	25–19	10–15	100–105

== Final Four ==
- Organizer: (Russia) Lokomotiv Belgorod
- Place: Belgorod

Semifinals
27 March
(Russia) Iskra Odintsovo	3
(Greece) Iraklis Thessaloniki	0
27 March
(Russia) Lokomotiv Belgorod	3
(France) Tours VB	0

Final
28 March
(Russia) Iskra Odintsovo	0
(Russia) Lokomotiv Belgorod	3
3rd place match
28 March
(Greece) Iraklis Thessaloniki	2
(France) Tours VB	3

=== Semifinals ===
Date	Time		Score		Set 1	Set 2	Set 3	Set 4	Set 5	Total
27 Mar	16:00	Iskra Odintsovo (Russia)	3–0	(Greece) Iraklis Thessaloniki	25–22	25–22	25–23			75–67
27 Mar	19:30	Lokomotiv Belgorod (Russia)	3–0	(France) Tours VB	25–20	25–16	25–17			75–53

=== 3rd place match ===
Date	Time		Score		Set 1	Set 2	Set 3	Set 4	Set 5	Total
28 Mar	16:00	Iraklis Thessaloniki (Greece)	2–3	(France) Tours VB	18–25	25–23	25–20	17–25	13–15	98–108

=== Final ===
Date	Time		Score		Set 1	Set 2	Set 3	Set 4	Set 5	Total
28 Mar	19:30	Iskra Odintsovo (Russia)	0–3	(Russia) Lokomotiv Belgorod	21–25	19–25	15–25			55–75

== Final standings ==
Rank	Team
1st place, gold medalist(s)	(Russia) Lokomotiv Belgorod
2nd place, silver medalist(s)	(Russia) Iskra Odintsovo
3rd place, bronze medalist(s)	(France) Tours VB
4	(Greece) Iraklis Thessaloniki

2003–04 CEV Champions League winners
(Russia)
Lokomotiv Belgorod
2nd title
