= Dominique Baeyens =

Belgian volleyball coach

Personal information
- Born: 21 February 1956 (age 70); Berchem, Belgium
- Height: 1.89 m (6 ft 2 in)

Coaching information
Previous teams coached
Years	Teams
1987–1994; 1994–1997; 1995–1996; 1997–2012; 2012–2016; 2020	VC Zellik; Belgium; VC Zellik; Knack Roeselare; Belgium; Belgium

Volleyball information
- Position: Outside hitter

Career
Years	Teams
1979–1983; 1983–1987; 1987–1988	Kruikenburg Ternat; Knack Roeselare; VC Zellik
Honours
Men's volleyball
Head coach Belgium
European League
Gold medal – first place	2013 Turkey

Dominique Baeyens (born 21 February 1956) is a Belgian former professional volleyball player and coach.

== Honours ==
=== As a player ===
- Domestic
  - 1981–82 Belgian Cup, with Kruikenburg Ternat

=== As a coach ===
- CEV Cup
  - 2001–02 – with Knack Roeselare
- CEV Challenge Cup
  - 1997–98 – with Knack Roeselare
  - 1998–99 – with Knack Roeselare
- Domestic
  - 1991–92 Belgian Championship, with Maes Pils Zellik
  - 1992–93 Belgian Championship, with Maes Pils Zellik
  - 1993–94 Belgian Championship, with Maes Pils Zellik
  - 1999–2000 Belgian Cup, with Knack Roeselare
  - 1999–2000 Belgian Championship, with Knack Roeselare
  - 2000–01 Belgian SuperCup, with Knack Roeselare
  - 2004–05 Belgian SuperCup, with Knack Roeselare
  - 2004–05 Belgian Cup, with Knack Roeselare
  - 2004–05 Belgian Championship, with Knack Roeselare
  - 2005–06 Belgian SuperCup, with Knack Roeselare
  - 2005–06 Belgian Cup, with Knack Roeselare
  - 2005–06 Belgian Championship, with Knack Roeselare
  - 2006–07 Belgian Championship, with Knack Roeselare
  - 2007–08 Belgian SuperCup, with Knack Roeselare
  - 2009–10 Belgian Championship, with Knack Roeselare
  - 2010–11 Belgian SuperCup, with Knack Roeselare
  - 2010–11 Belgian Cup, with Knack Roeselare

Sporting positions
Preceded by (Belgium) Brecht Van Kerckhove	Head coach of Belgium; 2020	Succeeded by (Spain) Fernando Muñoz
Preceded by (Belgium) Claudio Gewehr	Head coach of Belgium; 2012–2016	Succeeded by (Belgium) Vital Heynen
Preceded by (Argentina) Enrique Pisani	Head coach of Belgium; 1994–1997	Succeeded by (Belgium) Marc Spaenjers
