= VDK =

VDK may refer to: An Indian Actor

          Vijay Devarakonda

== Sport ==
- VDK Gent Dames, Belgian women's volleyball team
- VDK Gent in Liga A in Belgium Men's Volleyball League
- VDK Gent Heren in Liga B in Belgium Men's Volleyball League

== Other uses ==
- Volksbund Deutsche Kriegsgräberfürsorge, abbreviation VDK, German War Graves Commission
- VDK Spaarbank, Belgian bank
