= Fernando Muñoz (volleyball) =

Spanish volleyball coach

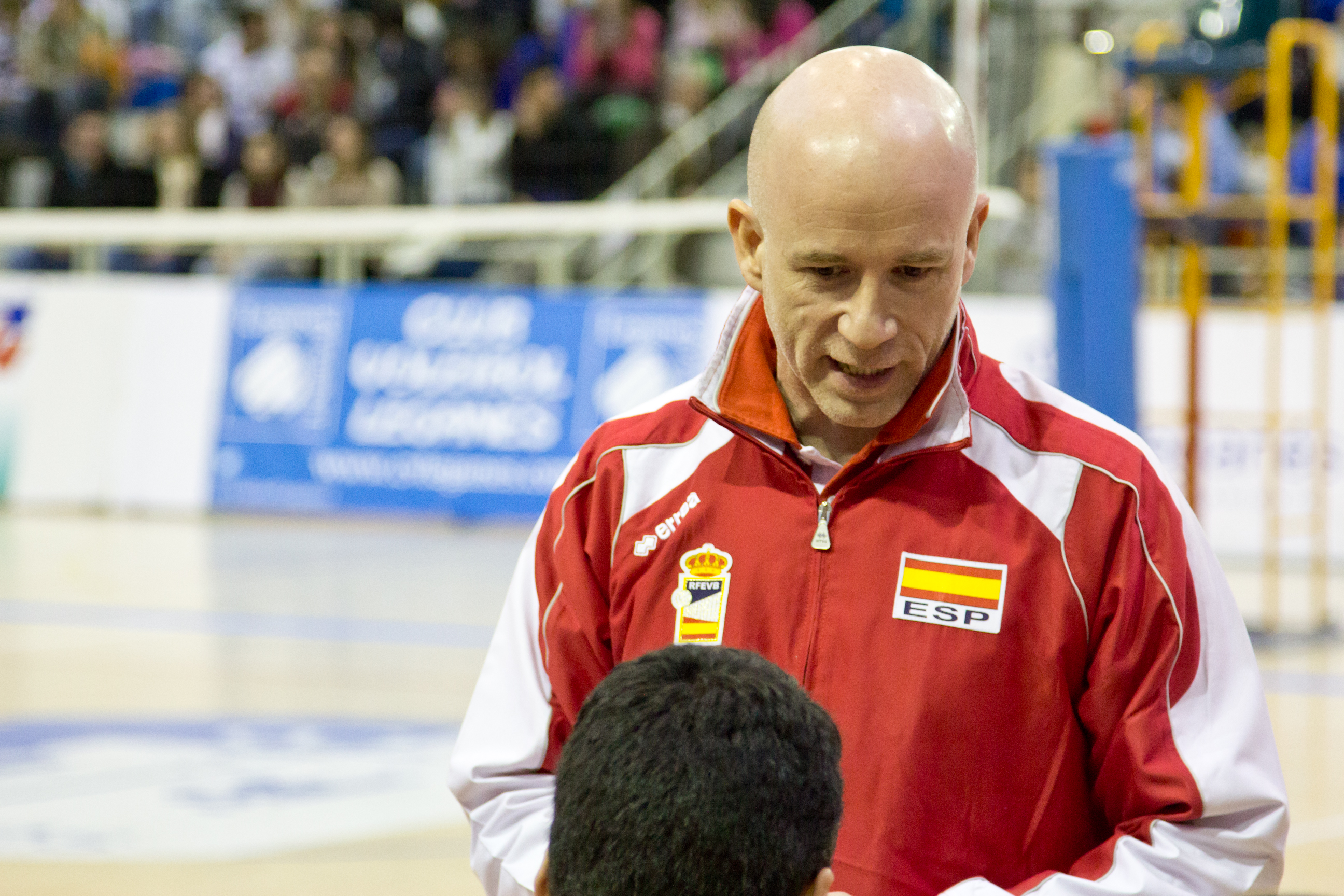

Personal information
- Full name: Fernando Muñoz Benítez
- Born: 27 July 1970 (age 56); Madrid, Spain

Coaching information
- Current team: Mladost Zagreb
Previous teams coached
| Years | Teams |
|---|---|
| 1999–2004; 2004–2006; 2006–2010; 2010–2011; 2011–2020; 2013–2017; 2017–2020; 2020–2022; 2021; 2021–2023; 2023–2025; 2024; 2025– | CV Almería; Voley Guada; Arkas İzmir; Río Duero Soria; Spain; Ziraat Bankası Ankara; Olympiacos; Belgium; CV Alcobendas; Dinamo București; Al Ahly; Egypt; Mladost Zagreb |
Honours
Men's volleyball
Head coach Spain
European League
| Silver medal – second place | 2011 Slovakia |
| Bronze medal – third place | 2012 Turkey |
Mediterranean Games
| Silver medal – second place | 2018 Tarragona |
Head coach Egypt
FIVB Challenger Cup
| Bronze medal – third place | 2024 Linyi |

Fernando Muñoz Benítez (born 27 July 1970) is a Spanish professional volleyball coach. He serves as head coach for Mladost Zagreb.

== Honours ==
=== Club ===
- CEV Challenge Cup
  - 2008–09 – with Arkas İzmir
  - 2017–18 – with Olympiacos
- Domestic
  - 1999–2000 Spanish Cup, with CV Almería
  - 1999–2000 Spanish Championship, with CV Almería
  - 2000–01 Spanish Championship, with CV Almería
  - 2001–02 Spanish Cup, with CV Almería
  - 2001–02 Spanish Championship, with CV Almería
  - 2002–03 Spanish SuperCup, with CV Almería
  - 2002–03 Spanish Championship, with CV Almería
  - 2003–04 Spanish SuperCup, with CV Almería
  - 2003–04 Spanish Championship, with CV Almería
  - 2006–07 Turkish Championship, with Arkas İzmir
  - 2008–09 Turkish Cup, with Arkas İzmir
  - 2017–18 Greek League Cup, with Olympiacos
  - 2017–18 Greek Championship, with Olympiacos
  - 2018–19 Greek League Cup, with Olympiacos
  - 2018–19 Greek Championship, with Olympiacos
  - 2022–23 Romanian SuperCup, with Dinamo București

Sporting positions
| Preceded by (Belgium) Dominique Baeyens | Head coach of Belgium; 2020–2022 | Succeeded by (Italy) Emanuele Zanini |
