= Lienert Cosemans =

Belgian volleyball player (born 1993)

Personal information
- Nationality: Belgian
- Born: 20 October 1993 (age 33)
- Height: 203 cm (6 ft 8 in)
- Weight: 93 kg (205 lb)
- Spike: 340 cm (134 in)
- Block: 315 cm (124 in)

Volleyball information
- Number: 5 (national team)

Career
Years	Teams
2015 - 2016	Prefaxis Menen

National team
2015	Belgium

Lienert Cosemans (born 20 October 1993) is a Belgian male volleyball player. He is part of the Belgium men's national volleyball team. On club level he plays for VBC Waremme.
