= VBC Waremme =

Belgian volleyball club

- Full name: VBC Waremme-Borgworm
- Founded: 1999
- Ground: Pôle Ballon, Chaussée Romaine,67 , 4300 Waremme (Capacity: 500)
- Chairman: (Belgium) Vincent Perrin
- Manager: (France) Philippe Barca-Cysique
- League: Euro Millions Volley League
- Website: Club home page

Uniforms
| Home | Away |

VBC Waremme is a volleyball club based in Waremme, Belgium. It plays in the Belgian Volleyball League.

== History ==
The creation of VBC Waremme dates back to 1999, when two local clubs, Schbing Waremme and Muronday's Oreye, decided to fuse together with the aim of creating a single big club in the Waremme area. Starting its first season at the highest level of provincial volleyball, the club slowly rose through the ranks, managing to reach the highest division in men's volleyball in Belgium, the Belgian Volleyball League.

== Past Results ==
- 1999-2000: 2nd in the 1st Provincial Division Liége and promotion to the 3rd National Division.
- 2003-2004: Champion in the 3rd National Division. and promotion to the 2nd National Division.
- 2004-2005: Champion in the 2nd National Division and promotion to the 1st National Division.
- 2009-2010: 2nd in the 1st National Division and promotion to the Ligue A and not to Ligue B following the restructuration of the leagues.

== Honours ==
- Liège Provincial Cup (4)
  - Winner : 2004, 2005, 2006, 2007

== First Team Coaches ==
Below is the list of the past coaches of the VBC Waremme, starting from its inception.

| Coach | Nat. | From | To | Tenure length | Honors |
|---|---|---|---|---|---|
| René Roman | (Belgium) | 08/1999 | 06/2001 | 1 year and 10 months | 1999-2000: 2nd in the 1st Provincial Division Liége (D6) and promotion to the 3rd National Division (D5). 2000-2001: 3rd in the 3rd National Division (D5). |
| Renaud Heine | (Belgium) | 06/2001 | 03/2003 | 1 year and 9 months | 2001-2002: 5th in the 3rd National Division (D5). |
| Serge Voisin | (Belgium) | 03/2003 | 06/2003 | 3 mois | 2002-2003: 9th in the 3rd National Division (D5). |
| Thierry Courtois | (Belgium) | 06/2003 | 06/2004 | 1 year | 2003-2004: Champion undefeated in the 3rd National Division (D5) and Winner of the Provincial Cup. |
| Erik Verstraeten | (Belgium) | 06/2004 | 06/2006 | 2 years | 2004-2005: Champion undefeated in the 2nd National Division (D4) and Winner of the Provincial Cup. 2005-2006: 3rd in the 1st National Division (D3) and Winner of the Provincial Cup. |
| Richard Frères | (Belgium) | 06/2006 | 10/2006 | 4 months | |
| Thierry Courtois (II) | (Belgium) | 10/2006 | 11/2006 | 1 month | Interim coach |
| Luc Gijbels | (Belgium) | 11/2006 | 10/2008 | 1 an et 11 mois | 2006-2007: 6th in 1st National Division (D3) and Winner of the Provincial Cup. 2007-2008: 3rd in 1st National Division (D3). |
| Koen Baeyens | (Belgium) | 10/2008 | 06/2010 | 1 year and 8 months | 2008-2009: 3rd in the 1st National Division (D3). 2009-2010: 2nd in the 1st National Divisione (D3) and promotion to the Ligue A (D1). |
| Frédérik Delanghe | (Belgium) | 06/2010 | 12/2011 | 1 year and 6 months | 2010-2011: 10th in the Ligue A (D1) and not relegated through the forfeit of VC Schelde-Natie Kapellen. |
| Pierre Honnay | (Belgium) | 12/2011 | 02/2012 | 2 months | Interim coach |
| Pascal Libon | (Belgium) | 02/2012 | 04/2014 | 2 years and 2 months | 2011-2012: 10th in the Ligue A (D1) and not relegated through the forfeit of PNV Waasland Kruibeke. 2012-2013: 9th in the Ligue A (D1). 2013-2014: 8th in the Ligue A (D1). |
| Petr Klar | (Czech Republic) | 05/2014 | 03/2015 | 10 months | Sacked a few games from the end of the season. |
| Pierre Honnay (II) | (Belgium) | 03/2015 | 04/2017 | 2 years | Interim coach following the sacking of Petr Klar before being given the job permanently the next season. 2014-2015: 10th in the Ligue A (D1) and not relegated as no team was planned to go down. 2015-2016: 10th in the Ligue A (D1) and not relegated as no team was planned to go down. 2016-2017: 8th in the Ligue A (D1). |
| Dimitri Piraux | (Belgium) | 05/2017 | 04/2018 | 1 year | 2017-2018: 8th in the Ligue A (D1). |

== Squad ==
Coach: (France) Philippe Barca-Cysique
Ass.Coach: (Belgium) Frédéric Servotte

| # | Nat. | Name |
|---|---|---|
| 1 | (Moldova) | Serghei Predius |
| 2 | (Belgium) | Samuel Fafchamps |
| 4 | (Belgium) | Inga Ladji |
| 5 | (Belgium) | Tom Leturcq |
| 6 | (France) | Julien Gatineau |
| 7 | (Luxembourg) | Chris Zuidberg |
| 8 | (Slovenia) | Zan Novljan |
| 9 | (Belgium) | Lucas Lallemand |
| 10 | (Portugal) | Joao Oliveira |
| 11 | (Belgium) | Martin Perrin |
| 12 | (Belgium) | Guillaume Dussart |
| 13 | (Belgium) | Clément Evrard |
| 14 | (Belgium) | Joery Van der Velden |
| 15 | (Belgium) | Lienert Cosemans |
| 18 | (Belgium) | Roman Abinet |
