= Caruur Volley Gent =

- Full name: Caruur Volley Gent
- Founded: 1990
- Ground: Edugo Arena, Oostakker (Capacity: 1,170)
- League: Lotto Volley League
- Website: caruurvolleygent.be

Caruur Volley Gent is a Belgian volleyball club based in Oostakker, a submunicipality of Ghent, Belgium. Founded in 1990, the club competes in the national Belgian volleyball competitions and operates both senior and youth teams.

The men's team won the Belgian Cup in 2022, marking the club's first major national trophy.

== Honours ==
- Belgian Cup
  - Winners: 2022
