= VC Leipzig =

- Full name: Volleyball Club Leipzig
- Founded: 1962 SC Leipzig; 2000 VV Leipzig; 2006 VC Leipzig
- Ground: Arena Leipzig (Capacity: 12,000)
- Manager: Frank Thiele
- League: 1. Bundesliga
- Website: Club home page

Uniforms
Home	Away

Volleyball Club Leipzig is a German professional volleyball team based in Leipzig.

== History ==
The club was born in 1962 as SC Leipzig from the union between the teams that had formed part of the multi-sport "Deutsche Hochschule fur Korperkultur" and "SC Rotation Leipzig" (it had helped to create the football team Lokomotive Leipzig) in the fifties that had already placed respectively four and two times their name on the albo d'oro of the East German volleyball championship.

The new club, the Sport Club Leipzig ruled absolutely in championship at the turn of the sixties. Between 1962 (year of the triumph of Rotation Leipzig) and 1976 it won fourteen consecutive national titles and in 1964 won the CEV European Champions Cup (against the Yugoslavian Mladost), the first European triumph for any East German sport club. Also, Leipzig won five titles in the eighties, before the German reunification.

In 2000 the club changed its name to the more German VV Leipzig (Volleyball-Verein Leipzig), and in 2006, following the merger with the Volleyball Club of Markranstädt, adopted the current name. Now the club plays in the 1. Bundesliga.

== Honours ==
East German League

- Winners (20): 1961-62, 1962–63, 1963–64, 1964–65, 1965–66, 1966–67, 1967–68, 1968–69, 1969–70, 1970–71, 1971–72, 1972–73, 1973–74, 1974–75, 1975–76, 1981–82, 1982–83, 1984–85, 1986–87, 1988-89

East German Cup

- Winners (4): 1962-63, 1964–65, 1965–66, 1966-67

CEV Champions League

- Winners (1): 1963-64
