= Volejbal Brno =

- Founded: 1998
- Ground: Sokol Brno I, Kounicova; Brno; Czech Republic.
- Chairman: Martin Gerža
- Manager: Ivan Blagojević
- League: Extraliga
- 2024–25: 5th place
- Website: Club home page

Volejbal Brno is volleyball club, which participates in the men's top Czech volleyball competition (Premier League). In addition to the professional team, the club also has active youth teams of all age levels, which regularly achieve high placings in contests.

== History ==
=== Location since the season 1998/99 ===
- 1998/99 - 7th place (Premier League - 8 teams)
- 1999/00 - 6th place (Premier League - 8 teams)
- 2000/01 - 8th place (Premier League- 8 teams)
- 2001/02 - 4th place (1st League - 12 teams)
- 2002/03 - 10th place (1st League - 12 teams)
- 2003/04 - 2nd place (1st League - 12 teams)
- 2004/05 - 8th place (Premier League - 8 teams)
- 2005/06 - 8th place (Premier League - 10 teams)
- 2006/07 - 4th place (Premier League - 10 teams)
- 2007/08 - 6th place (Premier League - 10 teams)
- 2008/09 - 8th place (Premier League - 12 teams)
- 2009/10 - 10th place (Premier League - 11 teams)
- 2010/11 - 12th place (Premier League - 12 teams)

After the 2000/01 season the team at first in history has come down from the top competition. Before the 2004/05 season took the club extraleague license from Kladno, where he and his team moved licenses Odolena Voda. Starting 2003/04 season using the name of the team sponsor JMP Brno, before it has UNIS Brno

=== Titles (1st place in the Premier League) ===
- 1945/46 - SK Židenice Brno
- 1964/65 - Spartak Brno ZJŠ (Závody Jana Švermy)
- 1966/67 - Spartak Brno ZJŠ (Závody Jana Švermy)
- 1968/69 - Zbrojovka Zetor Brno
- 1969/70 - Zbrojovka Zetor Brno
- 1970/71 - Zbrojovka Zetor Brno
- 1973/74 - Zbrojovka Brno
- 1988/89 - Zbrojovka Brno

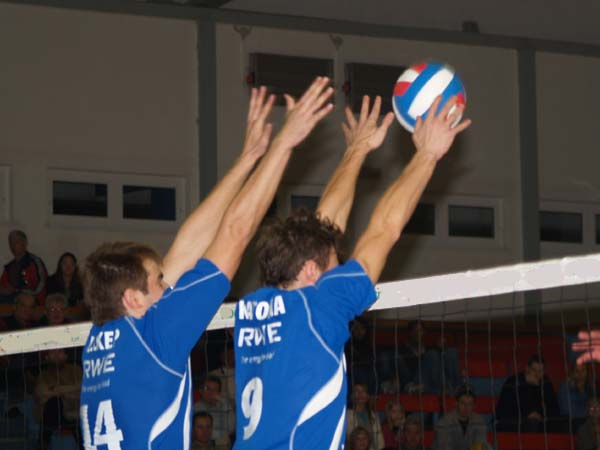
Volejbal Brno players

=== Success with junior teams ===
- Under 20 - 2010/11 (3rd), 2009/10 (1st), 2008/09 (1st), 2006/07 (1st), 2004/05 (2nd), 2003/04 (1st)
- Under 18 - 2010/11 (2nd), 2009/10 (2nd), 2008/09 (3rd), 2007/08 (1st), 2006/07 (1st), 2005/06 (1st), 2004/05 (2nd)
- Under 16 - 2010/11 (1st), 2009/10 (2nd), 2008/09 (2nd), 2007/08 (1st), 2005/06 (1st)

Note: season (position in top competition of this category)

=== Former players ===
Lukáš Diviš (*1986, Fridrichshafen), Zdeněk Haník (*1986, Kocouři Vavex Příbram), Michal Hrazdira (*1985, Bassano Volley), Vlado Katona (*1984, Slavia Havířov), Martin Klapal (*1984, DHL Ostrava), Luboš Novák (*1985, Dukla Liberec), Jan Václavík (*1985, DHL Ostrava)

Note: (year of birth, new team)

== Teams and their participation in competitions ==
- Men "A": Czech Premier League, Czech Cup
- Men "B": Czech First League
- Juniors U20 "A": Czech Premier League U20
- Juniors U20 "B": Czech First League U20, Regional Cup U20
- Juniors U18: Czech Premier League U18
- Juniors U16 "A": Regional League U16
- Juniors U16 "B": Regional League U16
- Juniors U16 "C": Regional League U16
- Juniors U16 "D": Regional League U16
- Small volleyball
- Preparatory

== International matches ==
In the recent past, the club participated only in the CEV Challenge Cup, where it lost in the first round to the Romanian team Steaua București.

They often take part in preparatory matches with foreign associations. Frequent opponents are i.a. VK Slovan Bratislava and SK Posojilnica Aich/Dob.

== External references ==
- official website of Volejbal Brno (Czech)
- website of youth of Volejbal Brno (Czech)
