= VC Zellik =

Belgian volleyball club

VC Zellik (Volleybalclub Zellik) was a Belgian former professional volleyball club from the urbanised town of Zellik.

== History ==
In the 90s Zellik under the sponsorship name Maes pils was played at Belgian volleyball top level. In 1992, 1993 and 1994, the club won three successive league titles in the national league.

Zellik was the first Belgian club which got through to the final four of the European Champions Cup. The club succeeded three times in a row. In the season 1993-1994 was the third club in this championsleague volleyball clubs. The final was that season missed by a 1-3 loss against il Messaggero Ravenna in the semifinals. In the third place game Maes pils Zellik lost to the former finalist and Greek champions Olympiacos from Piraeus. Also the next two seasons Maes pils didn't succeed to play in the final. In 1993-94 ranked third by defeated Olympiacos in the small final and in 1994-95 fourth with the same opponent.

In the late 90s Maes Pils Zellik had stopped to participate in the volleyball championship. The first team of Lennik volleyball club then decided to take the site of the former top team on loan. However, the youth team remained in Lennik. The club has recently become known as VC Asse-Lennik'.

== Honours ==
Belgian League

- Winners (3): 1991-92, 1992–93, 1993–94
