= CEV Champions League =

Volleyball competition

- Current season, competition or edition: 2026–27 CEV Champions League
- Formerly: CEV European Champions Cup (1959–2000)
- Sport: Volleyball
- Founded: 1959; 67 years ago
- Administrator: CEV
- No. of teams: 20 (group stage)
- Country: CEV members
- Continent: Europe
- Most recent champions: (Italy) Sir Sicoma Monini Perugia (2nd title)
- Most titles: (Soviet Union) CSKA Moscow (13 titles)
- Website: championsleague.cev.eu

The CEV Champions League is the top official competition for men's volleyball clubs from the whole of Europe. The competition is organised every year by the European Volleyball Confederation.

== Formula (2018–19 to present) ==
=== Qualification ===
A total of 20 teams participate in the main competition, with 18 teams being allocated direct vacancies on the basis of ranking list for European Cup Competitions, and 2 teams from the qualification rounds.

=== League round ===
20 teams take part in the League round where they are split into 5 groups. After each match the following points are assigned:

- Winner (3:0 or 3:1) – 3 points
- Winner (3:2) – 2 points
- Loser (2:3) – 1 point
- Loser (1:3 or 0:3) – 0 points

Each pool will be contested in a six-leg double round-robin home-and-away format. In each gender, the five pool winners and the three best-ranked pool runners-up will advance to the quarterfinals.

=== Quarterfinals ===
4 pairs are formed and two matches are held between teams in pair. Four winners qualify to the semifinals.

=== Semifinals ===
2 pairs are formed and two matches are held between teams in pairs. Two winners qualify to the final. Final is held in May.

== History ==
- CEV European Champions Cup (1959–60 to 1999–2000)
- CEV Champions League (2000–01 to present)

== Title holders ==
- 1959–60: (Soviet Union) CSKA Moscow
- 1960–61: (Romania) Rapid București
- 1961–62: (Soviet Union) CSKA Moscow
- 1962–63: (Romania) Rapid București
- 1963–64: (East Germany) SC Leipzig
- 1964–65: (Romania) Rapid București
- 1965–66: (Romania) Dinamo București
- 1966–67: (Romania) Dinamo București
- 1967–68: (Czechoslovakia) Volejbal Brno
- 1968–69: (Bulgaria) CSKA Sofia
- 1969–70: (Soviet Union) Burevestnik Almaty
- 1970–71: (Soviet Union) Burevestnik Almaty
- 1971–72: (Czechoslovakia) Volejbal Brno
- 1972–73: (Soviet Union) CSKA Moscow
- 1973–74: (Soviet Union) CSKA Moscow
- 1974–75: (Soviet Union) CSKA Moscow
- 1975–76: (Czechoslovakia) Dukla Liberec
- 1976–77: (Soviet Union) CSKA Moscow
- 1977–78: (Poland) Płomień Milowice
- 1978–79: (Czechoslovakia) Červená Hvězda Bratislava
- 1979–80: (Italy) Pallavolo Torino
- 1980–81: (Romania) Dinamo București

- 1981–82: (Soviet Union) CSKA Moscow
- 1982–83: (Soviet Union) CSKA Moscow
- 1983–84: (Italy) Pallavolo Parma
- 1984–85: (Italy) Pallavolo Parma
- 1985–86: (Soviet Union) CSKA Moscow
- 1986–87: (Soviet Union) CSKA Moscow
- 1987–88: (Soviet Union) CSKA Moscow
- 1988–89: (Soviet Union) CSKA Moscow
- 1989–90: (Italy) Modena Volley
- 1990–91: (Soviet Union) CSKA Moscow
- 1991–92: (Italy) Porto Ravenna Volley
- 1992–93: (Italy) Porto Ravenna Volley
- 1993–94: (Italy) Porto Ravenna Volley
- 1994–95: (Italy) Volley Treviso
- 1995–96: (Italy) Modena Volley
- 1996–97: (Italy) Modena Volley
- 1997–98: (Italy) Modena Volley
- 1998–99: (Italy) Volley Treviso
- 1999–00: (Italy) Volley Treviso
- 2000–01: (France) Paris Volley
- 2001–02: (Italy) Volley Lube
- 2002–03: (Russia) Lokomotiv Belgorod

- 2003–04: (Russia) Lokomotiv Belgorod
- 2004–05: (France) Tours VB
- 2005–06: (Italy) Volley Treviso
- 2006–07: (Germany) VfB Friedrichshafen
- 2007–08: (Russia) Dynamo Tattransgaz Kazan
- 2008–09: (Italy) Trentino Volley
- 2009–10: (Italy) Trentino Volley
- 2010–11: (Italy) Trentino Volley
- 2011–12: (Russia) Zenit Kazan
- 2012–13: (Russia) Lokomotiv Novosibirsk
- 2013–14: (Russia) Belogorie Belgorod
- 2014–15: (Russia) Zenit Kazan
- 2015–16: (Russia) Zenit Kazan
- 2016–17: (Russia) Zenit Kazan
- 2017–18: (Russia) Zenit Kazan
- 2018–19: (Italy) Volley Lube
- 2020–21: (Poland) ZAKSA Kędzierzyn-Koźle
- 2021–22: (Poland) ZAKSA Kędzierzyn-Koźle
- 2022–23: (Poland) ZAKSA Kędzierzyn-Koźle
- 2023–24: (Italy) Trentino Volley
- 2024–25: (Italy) Sir Sicoma Monini Perugia
- 2025–26: (Italy) Sir Sicoma Monini Perugia

== CEV European Champions Cup ==
Season	Final			Third place match	
Season	Champion	Score	Second place	Third place	Fourth place
1959–60	(Soviet Union); CSKA Moscow	3–0, 1–3	(Romania); Rapid București		
1960–61	(Romania); Rapid București	3–0, 3–2	(Soviet Union); CSKA Moscow		
1961–62	(Soviet Union); CSKA Moscow	2–3, 3–1	(Romania); Rapid București		
1962–63	(Romania); Rapid București	3–1, 3–0	(Soviet Union); CSKA Moscow		
1963–64	(East Germany); SC Leipzig	3–1, 3–1	(Socialist Federal Republic of Yugoslavia); HAOK Mladost		
1964–65	(Romania); Rapid București	1–3, 3–1, 3–2	(Bulgaria); Minyor Pernik		
1965–66	(Romania); Dinamo București	3–1, 3–2	(Romania); Rapid București		
1966–67	(Romania); Dinamo București	3–0, 1–3, 3–1	(Romania); Rapid București		
1967–68	(Czechoslovakia); Volejbal Brno	1–3, 3–0, 3–2	(Romania); Dinamo București		
1968–69	(Bulgaria); CSKA Sofia	3–0, 3–2	(Romania); Steaua București		
1969–70	(Soviet Union); Burevestnik Almaty	3–0, 3–1	(Czechoslovakia); Volejbal Brno		
1970–71	(Soviet Union); Burevestnik Almaty	2–3, 3–1, 3–2	(Czechoslovakia); Volejbal Brno		
1971–72	(Czechoslovakia); Volejbal Brno	Group Stage	(Netherlands); AMVJ Amstelveen	(Italy); Ruini Firenze	(Albania); Dinamo Tirana
1972–73	(Soviet Union); CSKA Moscow	Group Stage	(Poland); Resovia	(Czechoslovakia); Rudá Hvězda Praha	(Czechoslovakia); Volejbal Brno
1973–74	(Soviet Union); CSKA Moscow	Group Stage	(Romania); Dinamo București	(East Germany); SC Leipzig	(Netherlands); Starlift Voorburg
1974–75	(Soviet Union); CSKA Moscow	Group Stage	(Czechoslovakia); Volejbal Brno	(East Germany); SC Leipzig	(Bulgaria); Slavia Sofia
1975–76	(Czechoslovakia); Dukla Liberec	Group Stage	(Bulgaria); Slavia Sofia	(Socialist Federal Republic of Yugoslavia); Spartak Subotica	(Poland); Resovia
1976–77	(Soviet Union); CSKA Moscow	Group Stage	(Romania); Dinamo București	(Bulgaria); CSKA Sofia	(Socialist Federal Republic of Yugoslavia); Vardar Skopje
1977–78	(Poland); Płomień Milowice	Group Stage	(Netherlands); Starlift Voorburg	(Czechoslovakia); Aero Odolena Voda	(Turkey); Büyükdere Boronkay
1978–79	(Czechoslovakia); Červená Hviezda Bratislava	Group Stage	(Romania); Steaua București	(Poland); Płomień Milowice	(Finland); Pieksämäen Namika
1979–80	(Italy); Klippan Torino	Group Stage	(Czechoslovakia); Červená Hviezda Bratislava	(Turkey); Eczacıbaşı İstanbul	(Finland); Pieksämäen Namika
1980–81	(Romania); Dinamo București	Group Stage	(Soviet Union); CSKA Moscow	(Poland); Gwardia Wrocław	(Finland); Pieksämäen Namika
1981–82	(Soviet Union); CSKA Moscow	Group Stage	(Italy); Robe di Kappa Torino	(Romania); Dinamo București	(Greece); Olympiacos
1982–83	(Soviet Union); CSKA Moscow	Group Stage	(France); AS Cannes	(Italy); Santal Parma	(Spain); CV Pòrtol
1983–84	(Italy); Santal Parma	Group Stage	(Socialist Federal Republic of Yugoslavia); HAOK Mladost	(Czechoslovakia); Dukla Liberec	(France); AS Cannes
1984–85	(Italy); Santal Parma	Group Stage	(Socialist Federal Republic of Yugoslavia); HAOK Mladost	(Bulgaria); CSKA Sofia	(Czechoslovakia); Rudá Hvězda Praha
1985–86	(Soviet Union); CSKA Moscow	Group Stage	(Italy); Santal Parma	(Netherlands); Martinus Amstelveen	(Czechoslovakia); Rudá Hvězda Praha
1986–87	(Soviet Union); CSKA Moscow	Group Stage	(Italy); Panini Modena	(Netherlands); Martinus Amstelveen	(Bulgaria); CSKA Sofia
1987–88	(Soviet Union); CSKA Moscow	3–0	(Italy); Panini Modena	(Netherlands); Martinus Amstelveen	(Bulgaria); CSKA Sofia
1988–89	(Soviet Union); CSKA Moscow	3–1	(Italy); Panini Modena		
1989–90	(Italy); Philips Modena	3–2	(France); AS Fréjus	(Spain); CV Pòrtol	(Bulgaria); CSKA Sofia
1990–91	(Soviet Union); CSKA Moscow	3–1	(Italy); Maxicono Parma	(Italy); Philips Modena	(France); AS Cannes
1991–92	(Italy); Messaggero Ravenna	3–0	(Greece); Olympiacos	(Russia); CSKA Moscow	(France); AS Cannes
1992–93	(Italy); Messaggero Ravenna	3–0	(Italy); Maxicono Parma	(Greece); Olympiacos	(Belgium); Maes Pils Zellik
1993–94	(Italy); Messaggero Ravenna	3–0	(Italy); Maxicono Parma	(Belgium); Maes Pils Zellik	(Greece); Olympiacos
1994–95	(Italy); Sisley Treviso	3–0	(Italy); Edilcuoghi Ravenna	(Greece); Olympiacos	(Belgium); Maes Pils Zellik
1995–96	(Italy); Las Daytona Modena	3–1	(Germany); ASV Dachau	(Federal Republic of Yugoslavia); Vojvodina Novi Sad	(Italy); Sisley Treviso
1996–97	(Italy); Las Valtur Modena	3–0	(Belgium); Noliko Maaseik	(Croatia); HAOK Mladost	(Italy); Sisley Treviso
1997–98	(Italy); Casa Modena Unibon	3–0	(Spain); Unicaja Almería	(France); Paris Volley	(Croatia); HAOK Mladost
1998–99	(Italy); Sisley Treviso	3–0	(Belgium); Noliko Maaseik	(Germany); VfB Friedrichshafen	(Russia); Lokomotiv Belgorod
1999–00	(Italy); Sisley Treviso	3–1	(Germany); VfB Friedrichshafen	(Belgium); Noliko Maaseik	(Austria); Bayernwerk Wien

== CEV Champions League ==
Season	Final			Third place match / Semifinalists	
Season	Champion	Score	Second place	Third place	Fourth place
2000–01; Details	(France); Paris Volley	3–2	(Italy); Sisley Treviso	(Italy); Ford B. Gesù Roma	(Greece); Olympiacos
2001–02; Details	(Italy); Lube Banca Macerata	3–1	(Greece); Olympiacos	(Greece); Iraklis Thessaloniki	(Poland); Mostostal Azoty
2002–03; Details	(Russia); Lokomotiv Belgorod	3–0	(Italy); Kerakoll Modena	(Poland); Mostostal Azoty	(France); Paris Volley
2003–04; Details	(Russia); Lokomotiv Belgorod	3–0	(Russia); Iskra Odintsovo	(France); Tours VB	(Greece); Iraklis Thessaloniki
2004–05; Details	(France); Tours VB	3–1	(Greece); Iraklis Thessaloniki	(Russia); Lokomotiv Belgorod	(Germany); VfB Friedrichshafen
2005–06; Details	(Italy); Sisley Treviso	3–1	(Greece); Iraklis Thessaloniki	(Russia); Lokomotiv Belgorod	(Russia); Dynamo Moscow
2006–07; Details	(Germany); VfB Friedrichshafen	3–1	(France); Tours VB	(Russia); Dynamo Moscow	(Italy); Lube Banca Marche Macerata
2007–08; Details	(Russia); Dynamo Tattransgaz Kazan	3–2	(Italy); Copra Piacenza	(Poland); PGE Skra Bełchatów	(Italy); Sisley Treviso
2008–09; Details	(Italy); Trentino Volley	3–1	(Greece); Iraklis Thessaloniki	(Russia); Iskra Odintsovo	(Italy); Lube Banca Marche Macerata
2009–10; Details	(Italy); Trentino BetClic	3–0	(Russia); Dynamo Moscow	(Poland); PGE Skra Bełchatów	(Slovenia); ACH Volley Bled
2010–11; Details	(Italy); Trentino BetClic	3–1	(Russia); Zenit Kazan	(Russia); Dynamo Moscow	(Poland); Jastrzębski Węgiel
2011–12; Details	(Russia); Zenit Kazan	3–2	(Poland); PGE Skra Bełchatów	(Italy); Trentino PlanetWin365	(Turkey); Arkas İzmir
2012–13; Details	(Russia); Lokomotiv Novosibirsk	3–2	(Italy); Bre Banca Lannutti Cuneo	(Russia); Zenit Kazan	(Poland); ZAKSA Kędzierzyn-Koźle
2013–14; Details	(Russia); Belogorie Belgorod	3–1	(Turkey); Halkbank Ankara	(Poland); Jastrzębski Węgiel	(Russia); Zenit Kazan
2014–15; Details	(Russia); Zenit Kazan	3–0	(Poland); Asseco Resovia	(Germany); Berlin Recycling Volleys	(Poland); PGE Skra Bełchatów
2015–16; Details	(Russia); Zenit Kazan	3–2	(Italy); Diatec Trentino	(Italy); Cucine Lube Civitanova	(Poland); Asseco Resovia
2016–17; Details	(Russia); Zenit Kazan	3–0	(Italy); Sir Sicoma Colussi Perugia	(Italy); Cucine Lube Civitanova	(Germany); Berlin Recycling Volleys
2017–18; Details	(Russia); Zenit Kazan	3–2	(Italy); Cucine Lube Civitanova	(Italy); Sir Colussi Sicoma Perugia	(Poland); ZAKSA Kędzierzyn-Koźle
2018–19; Details	(Italy); Cucine Lube Civitanova	3–1	(Russia); Zenit Kazan	(Poland); PGE Skra Bełchatów	(Italy); Sir Colussi Sicoma Perugia
2019–20; Details	Cancelled				
2020–21; Details	(Poland); ZAKSA Kędzierzyn-Koźle	3–1	(Italy); Itas Trentino	(Italy); Sir Sicoma Monini Perugia	(Russia); Zenit Kazan
2021–22; Details	(Poland); ZAKSA Kędzierzyn-Koźle	3–0	(Italy); Itas Trentino	(Poland); Jastrzębski Węgiel	(Italy); Sir Sicoma Monini Perugia
2022–23; Details	(Poland); ZAKSA Kędzierzyn-Koźle	3–2	(Poland); Jastrzębski Węgiel	(Turkey); Halkbank Ankara	(Italy); Sir Sicoma Monini Perugia
2023–24; Details	(Italy); Itas Trentino	3–0	(Poland); Jastrzębski Węgiel	(Italy); Cucine Lube Civitanova	(Turkey); Ziraat Bank Ankara
2024–25; Details	(Italy); Sir Sicoma Monini Perugia	3–2	(Poland); Warta Zawiercie	(Poland); Jastrzębski Węgiel	(Turkey); Halkbank Ankara
2025–26; Details	(Italy); Sir Sicoma Monini Perugia	3–0	(Poland); Warta Zawiercie	(Turkey); Ziraat Bankkart Ankara	(Poland); PGE Projekt Warsaw

== Titles by club ==
Rank	Club	Titles	Runner–up	Champion years
1.	(Russian Soviet Federative Socialist Republic) CSKA Moscow (Note: CSKA Moscow represented the Russian Soviet Federative Socialist Republic (present-day Russia), one of the constituent republics of the Soviet Union. As a result, the club's historical achievements are typically considered part of Russia's sporting heritage.)	13	3	1960, 1962, 1973, 1974, 1975, 1977, 1982, 1983, 1986, 1987, 1988, 1989, 1991
2.	(Russia) Zenit Kazan	6	2	2008, 2012, 2015, 2016, 2017, 2018
3.	(Italy) Modena Volley	4	4	1990, 1996, 1997, 1998
4.	(Italy) Trentino Volley	4	3	2009, 2010, 2011, 2024
5.	(Italy) Volley Treviso	4	1	1995, 1999, 2000, 2006
6.	(Romania) Rapid București	3	4	1961, 1963, 1965
7.	(Romania) Dinamo București	3	3	1966, 1967, 1981
8.	(Italy) Porto Ravenna Volley	3	1	1992, 1993, 1994
9.	(Russia) Belogorie Belgorod	3		2003, 2004, 2014
=	(Poland) ZAKSA	3		2021, 2022, 2023
11.	(Italy) Pallavolo Parma	2	4	1984, 1985
12.	(Czechoslovakia) Volejbal Brno	2	3	1968, 1972
13.	(Italy) Volley Lube	2	1	2002, 2019
=	(Italy) Sir Safety Perugia	2	1	2025, 2026
15.	(Kazakh Soviet Socialist Republic) Burevestnik Almaty (Note: Burevestnik Almaty VC represented the Kazakh Soviet Socialist Republic (now Kazakhstan), a constituent republic of the Soviet Union. Therefore, the club's historical achievements are typically attributed to Kazakhstan.)	2		1970, 1971
16.	(Czechoslovakia) ČH Bratislava	1	1	1979
=	(Italy) Pallavolo Torino	1	1	1980
=	(France) Tours VB	1	1	2005
=	(Germany) VfB Friedrichshafen	1	1	2007
20.	(East Germany) SC Leipzig	1		1964
=	(Bulgaria) CSKA Sofia	1		1969
=	(Czechoslovakia) Dukla Liberec	1		1976
=	(Poland) Płomień Milowice	1		1978
=	(France) Paris Volley	1		2001
=	(Russia) Lokomotiv Novosibirsk	1		2013
26.	(Socialist Federal Republic of Yugoslavia) HAOK Mladost		3
=	(Greece) Iraklis Thessaloniki		3
28.	(Romania) Steaua București		2
=	(Belgium) Maaseik		2
=	(Greece) Olympiacos		2
=	(Poland) Resovia		2
=	(Poland) Jastrzębski Węgiel		2
=	(Poland) Warta Zawiercie		2
34.	(Bulgaria) Minyor Pernik		1
=	(Netherlands) AMVJ Amstelveen		1
=	(Bulgaria) Slavia Sofia		1
=	(Netherlands) Starlift Voorburg		1
=	(France) AS Cannes		1
=	(France) AS Fréjus		1
=	(Germany) ASV Dachau		1
=	(Spain) Unicaja Almería		1
=	(Russia) Iskra Odintsovo		1
=	(Italy) Volley Piacenza		1
=	(Russia) Dynamo Moscow		1
=	(Poland) Skra Bełchatów		1
=	(Italy) Piemonte Volley		1
=	(Turkey) Halkbank Ankara		1

== Titles by country ==
Rank	Country	Won	Runner–up	Total
1	(Russian Soviet Federative Socialist Republic) Russia	23	7	30
2	Italy	22	18	40
3	Romania	6	9	15
4	Poland	4	7	11
5	Czechoslovakia	4	4	8
6	France	2	3	5
7	(Kazakh Soviet Socialist Republic) Kazakhstan	2	0	2
8	Bulgaria	1	2	3
8	Germany	1	2	3
10	East Germany	1	–	1
11	Greece	–	5	5
12	Yugoslavia	–	3	3
13	Belgium	–	2	2
13	Netherlands	–	2	2
15	Spain	–	1	1
15	Turkey	–	1	1

== MVP by edition ==
- 2000–01 – Stéphane Antiga (FRA)
- 2001–02 – Marco Bracci (ITA)
- 2002–03 – Sergey Tetyukhin (RUS)
- 2003–04 – Andrey Egorchev (RUS)
- 2004–05 – Vladimir Nikolov (BUL)
- 2005–06 – Alessandro Fei (ITA)
- 2006–07 – Jochen Schöps (GER)
- 2007–08 – Clayton Stanley (USA)
- 2008–09 – Matey Kaziyski (BUL)
- 2009–10 – Osmany Juantorena (CUB)
- 2010–11 – Osmany Juantorena (CUB)
- 2011–12 – Mariusz Wlazły (POL)
- 2012–13 – Marcus Nilsson (SWE)

- 2013–14 – Sergey Tetyukhin (RUS)
- 2014–15 – Wilfredo León (CUB)
- 2015–16 – Wilfredo León (CUB)
- 2016–17 – Maxim Mikhaylov (RUS)
- 2017–18 – Maxim Mikhaylov (RUS)
- 2018–19 – Osmany Juantorena (ITA)
- 2020–21 – Aleksander Śliwka (POL)
- 2021–22 – Kamil Semeniuk (POL)
- 2022–23 – David Smith (USA)
- 2023–24 – Alessandro Michieletto (ITA)
- 2024–25 – Simone Giannelli (ITA)
- 2025–26 – Massimo Colaci (ITA)
