= Belgium Men's Volleyball League (Euro Millions Volley League) =

Belgian men's volleyball league

Lotto Volley League
- Current season, competition or edition: 2023–24 Lotto Volley League
- Sport: Volleyball
- Founded: 1944
- No. of teams: 9 (Knack Roeselare, VC Greenyard Maaseik, Lindemans Aalst, Volley Haasrode Leuven, Decospan Volley Team Menen, VC Tectum Achel, Waremme Volley, Volley Guibertin, Caruur Volley Gent)
- Country: Belgium
- Continent: Europe
- Most recent champion: Knack Roeselare
- Most titles: VC Greenyard Maaseik
- Website: Lotto Volley League (NL)

The Lotto Volley League (formerly Volleyliga Belgium, Ethias Pro League and Euro Millions Volley League) is the top flight in men's volleyball in Belgium. The league is organized by the Royal Belgian Volleyball Federation. VC Greenyard Maaseik is the most successful club of the Volleyliga with 16 national titles since 1991. The first Volleyliga was played in 1944–45 and won by Léopold Club.

The regular season is played by 10 or 9 teams, playing each other twice, once at home and once away from home. After the regular season, the six best-placed teams enter the play-offs, the first-placed team starting with five points, the second-placed with four, the third-placed with three, the fourth-placed with two and the fifth-placed with one. The last four teams enter the play-downs, the seventh-placed team of the regular season starting the play-downs with three points, the eighth-placed team with two and the ninth-placed team with one. The play-offs end with a final to the best of five, with the team finishing first of the play-offs having the home advantage.

== List of champions ==
- 1945 : Léopold Club
- 1946 : ASUB Bruxelles
- 1947 : Gendarmerie Ecole
- 1948 : Gendarmerie Ecole
- 1949 : R. Ixelles SC
- 1950 : R. Ixelles SC
- 1951 : R. Ixelles SC
- 1952 : R. Ixelles SC
- 1953 : R. Ixelles SC
- 1954 : R. Ixelles SC
- 1955 : R. Ixelles SC
- 1956 : Spartacus
- 1957 : Spartacus
- 1958 : Brabo Antwerpen
- 1959 : Brabo Antwerpen
- 1960 : Brabo Antwerpen
- 1961 : Brabo Antwerpen
- 1962 : Brabo Antwerpen
- 1963 : Brabo Antwerpen
- 1964 : Brabo Antwerpen
- 1965 : Brabo Antwerpen
- 1966 : Brabo Antwerpen
- 1967 : Brabo Antwerpen
- 1968 : Brabo Antwerpen
- 1969 : VRC Genk
- 1970 : VC Anderlecht
- 1971 : Rebels Lier
- 1972 : Rebels Lier
- 1973 : Rembert Torhout
- 1974 : Rebels Lier
- 1975 : VC Turnhout
- 1976 : VC Turnhout
- 1977 : VC Turnhout
- 1978 : Ibis Kortrijk
- 1979 : Ibis Kortrijk
- 1980 : VC Ruisbroek
- 1981 : VRC Genk
- 1982 : Ibis Kortrijk
- 1983 : Ibis Kortrijk
- 1984 : Ibis Kortrijk
- 1985 : Ibis Kortrijk
- 1986 : Ibis Kortrijk
- 1987 : VC Lennik
- 1988 : VC Lennik
- 1989 : Knack Roeselare
- 1990 : Rembert Torhout
- 1991 : Noliko Maaseik
- 1992 : Maes Pils Zellik
- 1993 : Maes Pils Zellik
- 1994 : Maes Pils Zellik
- 1995 : Noliko Maaseik
- 1996 : Noliko Maaseik
- 1997 : Noliko Maaseik
- 1998 : Noliko Maaseik
- 1999 : Noliko Maaseik
- 2000 : Knack Roeselare
- 2001 : Noliko Maaseik
- 2002 : Noliko Maaseik
- 2003 : Noliko Maaseik
- 2004 : Noliko Maaseik
- 2005 : Knack Roeselare
- 2006 : Knack Roeselare
- 2007 : Knack Roeselare
- 2008 : Noliko Maaseik
- 2009 : Noliko Maaseik
- 2010 : Knack Roeselare
- 2011 : Noliko Maaseik
- 2012 : Noliko Maaseik
- 2013 : Knack Roeselare
- 2014 : Knack Roeselare
- 2015 : Knack Roeselare
- 2016 : Knack Roeselare
- 2017 : Knack Roeselare
- 2018 : Noliko Maaseik
- 2019 : Greenyard Maaseik
- 2021 : Knack Roeselare
- 2022 : Knack Roeselare
- 2023 : Knack Roeselare
- 2024 : Knack Roeselare
- 2025 : Knack Roeselare
- 2026 : Greenyard Maaseik

Club	Number of titles	Years of titles
Greenyard Maaseik	17	1991, 1995, 1996, 1997, 1998, 1999, 2001, 2002, 2003, 2004, 2008, 2009, 2011, 2012, 2018, 2019, 2026
Knack Roeselare	16	1989, 2000, 2005, 2006, 2007, 2010, 2013, 2014, 2015, 2016, 2017, 2021, 2022, 2023, 2024, 2025
Brabo Antwerpen	11	1958, 1959, 1960, 1961, 1962, 1963, 1964, 1965, 1966, 1967, 1968
Ibis Kortrijk	7	1978, 1979, 1982, 1983, 1984, 1985, 1986
R. Ixelles SC	7	1949, 1950, 1951, 1952, 1953, 1954, 1955
Rebels Lier	3	1971, 1972, 1974
VC Turnhout	3	1975, 1976, 1977
Maes Pils Zellik	3	1992, 1993, 1994
Lindemans Aalst	2	1987, 1988
Rembert Torhout	2	1973, 1990
Gendarmerie Ecole	2	1947, 1948
Spartacus	2	1956, 1957
VRC Genk	2	1969, 1981
ASUB Bruxelles	1	1946
Léopold Club	1	1945
VC Anderlecht	1	1970
VC Ruisbroek	1	1980

== See also ==
- Belgium women's volleyball Division of Honour
