= Paris Volley =

French volleyball club

- Full name: Paris Volley
- Short name: PV
- Founded: 1998
- Ground: Salle Pierre Charpy (Capacity: 1,850)
- Chairman: Vladan Jelic
- Manager: Fabio Storti
- League: Ligue A
- 2023–24: 8th
- Website: Club home page

Uniforms
Home	Away

Paris Volley is a professional men's volleyball club based in Paris, France. They compete in the top flight of French volleyball, Ligue A. The club was founded in 1998 from the merger of the volleyball section of Paris Université Club (PUC) and Paris Saint-Germain Racing Volley.

== Honours ==
=== Domestic ===
- French Championship

Winners (9): 1999–2000, 2000–01, 2001–02, 2002–03, 2005–06, 2006–07, 2007–08, 2008–09, 2015–16

- French Cup

Winners (5): 1998–99, 1999–2000, 2001–01, 2003–04, 2025–26

- French SuperCup

Winners (3): 2004–05, 2006–07, 2013–14

=== International ===
- CEV Champions League

Winners (1): 2000–01

- CEV Cup

Winners (2): 1999–2000, 2013–14

== Current squad ==
Number	Name	Height	Nationality	in the club from
1	David Chaudet	1,91	France	
2	Gabriel Lechalier	1,93	France	
3	Davide Saitta	1,88	Italy	
4	Nicholas Hoag	2,00	Canada	
6	Mitja Gasparini	2,01	Slovenia	
8	Jorge Fernández Valcárcel	2,03	Spain	
9	Jacopo Massari	1,88	Italy	
13	Markus Steuerwald	1,82	Germany	
15	Kevin Kaba	2,05	France	
16	Dmitrii Bahov	1,95	Moldova	
18	Ardo Kreek	2,03	Estonia	
20	Dimitri Walgenwitz	1,83	France	

== Kit history ==
98/00 dom.	00/02 dom.	00/02 ext.	02/03 dom.	02/03 ext.	02/03 lib.

03/05 dom.	03/05 ext.	03/05 lib.	03/05 alt.	05/06 dom.	05/06 ext.

05/06 alt.	06/08 dom.	06/08 ext.	08/09 dom.	08/09 ext.	09/10 dom.

09/10 ext.	09/10 alt.	10/11 dom.	10/11 ext.	11/12 dom.	11/12 ext.

12/13 dom.	12/13 ext.	13/14 dom.	13/14 ext.	13/14 lib.	14/15 dom.

14/15 ext.	14/15 lib.	14/15 alt dom.	14/15 alt ext.	15/16 dom.	15/16 ext.

15/16 alt dom.	15/16 alt ext.	16/17 dom.	16/17 ext.	16/17 alt.	17/18 dom.

17/18 ext.
