= VC Maaseik =

Belgian volleyball club

Greenyard Maaseik
- Full name: Volleybalclub Greenyard Maaseik
- Founded: 1960
- Ground: Steengoed Arena
- Chairman: Raymond Cretskens
- Manager: Paweł Woicki
- League: Euro Millions Volley League
- 2025–26: Champions
- Website: Club home page

Uniforms
Home	Away

Greenyard Maaseik is a Belgian professional men's volleyball club from the city of Maaseik. They compete in the Lotto Volley League, and their home stadium is Steengoed Arena. Greenyard Maaseik holds most of the titles in the Lotto Volley League.

== Honors ==
=== Domestic ===
- Belgian Championship

Winners (17): 1990–91, 1994–95, 1995–96, 1996–97, 1997–98, 1998–99, 2000–01, 2001–02, 2002–03, 2003–04, 2007–08, 2008–09, 2010–11, 2011–12, 2017–18, 2018–19, 2025–26

- Belgian Cup

Winners (14): 1985–86, 1990–91, 1996–97, 1997–98, 1998–99, 2000–01, 2001–02, 2002–03, 2003–04, 2006–07, 2007–08, 2008–09, 2009–10, 2011–12

- Belgian Super Cup

Winners (14): 1995–96, 1996–97, 1997–98, 1998–99, 1999–2000, 2001–02, 2002–03, 2003–04, 2006–07, 2008–09, 2009–10, 2011–12, 2012–13, 2016–17

=== International ===
- CEV European Champions Cup

Silver (2): 1996–97, 1998–99

- CEV Cup

Silver (1): 2007–08

== History ==
The club was established in 1960 under the name Mavoc Maaseik and originated from the "Het Heilig Kruis College Maaseik" school. In the 1975–1976 season, with the support of a new main sponsor, Mavoc changed its name to D&V Motors and celebrated its promotion to the highest division in Belgium, the Eredivisie, where the team has competed since 1976.

In the 1985–1986 season, Emile De Bruyn, the general director of SCANA-NOLIKO, and Mathi Raschella, the president, provided additional support to the team. NOLIKO became the head sponsor, and under the coaching of Jos Klaps, the team won the Belgian Cup. On 1 November 1986, NOLIKO Maaseik played its first European match against VC Leipzig.

In the 1990–1991 season, with Bert Goedkoop as coach, the club won the Lotto Volley League for the first time and won the Cup for the second time. Eddy Evens, named player of the year, became the Technical Director and, along with De Bruyn, founded the business club AGORA "Valerianden Koliko Maaseik". A new facility was constructed, including a full-time secretary and a restaurant.

In the 1993–1994 and 1994–1995 seasons, the club reached the quarterfinals of the CEV Cup but lost against Padova and Nizhnevartovsk. Since the inception of the Champions League in 1996, it is the only team in Europe to have participated in the first five editions. Under head coach Anders Kristiansson, the club placed 5th in 1996, 2nd in 1997 (where they lost the final against Modena), 4th in 1998, 2nd in 1999 (where they lost the final against Treviso in Almería), and 3rd in 2000 (where they won the small final against Vienna (Aus) in Treviso).

Today, all players and coaches are professionals, and the organization is managed by a full-time manager with assistants, alongside many volunteers. Currently, the club comprises the following:

- NOLIKO Maaseik: Competing in the Belgian Championship (Eredivisie).
- AGORA: Business club established in 1992, including administration and a restaurant.
- NOLIKO Youth: Consisting of 200 boys and girls playing at various levels.
- Regio-Club: Founded in 1996 as a collaboration for youth players with 38 clubs from the province.
- FORTIS Tournament: An international tournament for six teams held since 1989.
- Beach Volley: Featuring eight permanent beach volleyball courts behind the sports hall since 1995.

In April 2002, Scana Noriko and the volleyball club signed a new two-year contract. General Director Dominique Stinckens and Club President Mathi Raschelle signed a sponsorship contract for the 18th and 19th seasons in 1985.
