= Knack Roeselare =

Belgian volleyball club

- Founded: 1964
- Ground: Sporthal Schiervelde (Capacity: 2,250)
- Chairman: Rik Vervisch
- Manager: Steven Vanmedegael
- League: Euro Millions Volley League
- 2024–25: Champions
- Website: Club home page

Uniforms
Home	Away

Knack Roeselare is a Belgian professional men's volleyball club based in Roeselare. They compete in the Euro Millions Volley League and the CEV Champions League. The club was founded on February 12, 1964. Officially they started in the lowest division of the Belgian Volleyball in September 1964. They quickly grew into one of the biggest clubs in Belgium. The games that Knack Roeselare plays home, are played in the REO arena. In the "Shiervelde" sports complex. The arena can hold a maximum of 2,250 people.

== Honours ==
=== Domestic ===
- Belgian Championship

Winners (16): 1988–89, 1999–2000, 2004–05, 2005–06, 2006–07, 2009–10, 2012–13, 2013–14, 2014–15, 2015–16, 2016–17, 2020–21, 2021–22, 2022–23, 2023–24, 2024–25

- Belgian Cup

Winners (17): 1988–89, 1989–90, 1993–94, 1999–2000, 2004–05, 2005–06, 2010–11, 2012–13, 2015–16, 2016–17, 2017–18, 2018–19, 2019–20, 2020–21, 2022–23, 2023–24, 2024–25

- Belgian SuperCup

Winners (11): 2000–01, 2004–05, 2005–06, 2007–08, 2010–11, 2013–14, 2014–15, 2018–19, 2019–20, 2022–23, 2023–24

=== International ===
- CEV Cup

Winners (1): 2001–02
Silver (1): 2022–23

- CEV Challenge Cup

Silver (2): 1997–98, 1998–99

- BeNe Conference

Winners (1): 2024–25

- BeNe Cup

Winners (1): 2024–25

== Team ==
As of 2022–23 season

No.	Name	Date of birth	Position
1	(Belgium) Dennis Deroey	14 August 1987 (age 38)	libero
4	(Belgium) Stijn D'Hulst	24 April 1991 (age 34)	setter
5	(Belgium) Pieter Coolman	24 April 1989 (age 36)	middle blocker
6	(Netherlands) Michiel Ahyi	28 July 1998 (age 27)	opposite
7	(Belgium) Simon Plaskie	10 April 2001 (age 24)	outside hitter
8	(Belgium) Matthijs Verhanneman	8 December 1988 (age 37)	outside hitter
10	(Brazil) Maicon Leite	6 May 1992 (age 33)	middle blocker
11	(Estonia) Märt Tammearu	17 March 2001 (age 24)	outside hitter
12	(Belgium) Seppe Rotty	12 March 2001 (age 24)	outside hitter
13	(Belgium) Sander Depovere	8 January 1995 (age 31)	setter
16	(Argentina) Pablo Kukartsev	23 March 1993 (age 32)	opposite
17	(Norway) Rune Fasteland	17 December 1995 (age 30)	middle blocker
Head coach:		(Belgium) Steven Vanmedegael	
