= Simon Tischer =

German volleyball player (born 1982)

Personal information
- Full name: Simon Tischer
- Born: April 24, 1982 (age 44) Schwäbisch Gmünd, West Germany
- Height: 1.99 m (6 ft 6 in)
- Weight: 89 kg (196 lb)
- Spike: 345 cm (136 in)
- Block: 328 cm (129 in)

Volleyball information
- Position: Setter
- Number: 4

Career
- Years: Team
- 2001-2002 2002-2003 2003-2004 2004-2007 2007-2009 2009-2010 2010-2011 2011-2012 2012-2013 2013-2014 2014–2018: (Germany) SV Fellbach (Germany) TSV Schmiden (Germany) Maoam Mendig (Germany) VfB Friedrichshafen (Greece) Iraklis Thessaloniki (Greece) Olympiacos Piraeus (Turkey) Ziraat Bankası Ankara (Russia) Dinamo Krasnodar (Poland) Jastrzębski Węgiel (France) ASUL Lyon Volley (Germany) VfB Friedrichshafen

National team
- Years: Team
- 2006-2013: Germany
- Updated on 28 April 2025

Simon Tischer (born 24 April 1982) is a German retired volleyball player. He was born in Schwäbisch Gmünd.

== International career ==
Simon Tischer was a member of the German National team for many years. He took part in many important international tournaments, such as at the 2006 World Championship in Japan (5th rank), and at 2007 European Championship in Russia (5th rank). He also competed at the Peking 2008 and London 2012 (5th rank) Olympic volleyball tournaments.
Simon Tischer totalized 210 appearances with the German National team

== Sporting achievements ==
=== Club ===
- 2006/07 CEV Champions League, with VfB Friedrichshafen
- 2008/09 CEV Champions League, with Iraklis Thessaloniki

National Championships

- 2004/05 German Championship, with VfB Friedrichshafen
- 2005/06 German Championship, with VfB Friedrichshafen
- 2006/07 German Championship, with VfB Friedrichshafen
- 2007/08 Hellenic Championship, with Iraklis Thessaloniki
- 2009/10 Hellenic Championship, with Olympiacos Piraeus
- 2010/11 Turkish Championship, with Ziraat Bankası Ankara
- 2012/13 Polish Championship, with Jastrzębski Węgiel
- 2014/15 German Championship, with VfB Friedrichshafen
- 2015/16 German Championship, with VfB Friedrichshafen
- 2016/17 German Championship, with VfB Friedrichshafen
- 2017/18 German Championship, with VfB Friedrichshafen

National Cups

- 2004/2005 German Cup, with VfB Friedrichshafen
- 2005/2006 German Cup, with VfB Friedrichshafen
- 2006/2007 German Cup, with VfB Friedrichshafen
- 2007 Hellenic Super Cup, with Iraklis Thessaloniki
- 2008 Hellenic Super Cup, with Iraklis Thessaloniki
- 2009/2010 Hellenic Cup, with Olympiacos Piraeus
- 2010 Turkish Super Cup, with Iraklis Thessaloniki
- 2014/2015 German Cup, with VfB Friedrichshafen
- 2016 German Super Cup, VfB Friedrichshafen
- 2016/2017 German Cup, with VfB Friedrichshafen
- 2017 German Super Cup, VfB Friedrichshafen
- 2017/2018 German Cup, with VfB Friedrichshafen
