= German Men's Volleyball Super Cup =

German Volleyball Super Cup
- Sport: Volleyball
- Founded: 1988
- Country: Germany
- Most recent champion: Berlin Recycling Volleys

The German Men's Volleyball Supercup is a volleyball competition between the champion of Germany and the winner of the Cup of Germany . The first edition of this competition was contested in the 1987–88 season. Since 2022 tournament is played as 8-team tournament Bounce House Cup.

== Winners list ==
Years	Champions	Score	Runners-up
1988	Hamburger SV		Bayer 04 Leverkusen
1989	Hamburger SV		Bayer 04 Leverkusen
1990	TSV Milbertshofen		Bayer 04 Leverkusen
1991	Moerser SC		SC Berlin
1993	Moerser SC		SCC Berlin
2016	VfB Friedrichshafen	3 : 0	Berlin Recycling Volleys
2017	VfB Friedrichshafen	3 : 1	Berlin Recycling Volleys
2018	VfB Friedrichshafen	3 : 1	Berlin Recycling Volleys
2019	Berlin Recycling Volleys	3: 0	VfB Friedrichshafen
2020	Berlin Recycling Volleys	3 : 0	United Volleys Frankfurt
2021	Berlin Recycling Volleys	3 : 0	United Volleys Frankfurt
2022	Berlin Recycling Volleys	3 : 0	VfB Friedrichshafen
2023	Berlin Recycling Volleys	3 : 0	VfB Friedrichshafen

== Honours by club ==
Rk.	Club	Titles	City	Years won
1	Berlin Recycling Volleys	5	Berlin	2019, 2020, 2021, 2022, 2023
2	VfB Friedrichshafen	3	Friedrichshafen	2016, 2017, 2018
3	Hamburger SV	2	Hamburg	1988,1989
=	Moerser SC	2	Moerser	1991, 1993
5	TSV Milbertshofen	1	Milbertshofen	1990
