= 2020–21 PlusLiga =

- League: PlusLiga
- Sport: Volleyball
- Duration: 11 Sept. 2020 – 21 April 2021
- Number of games: 209
- Number of teams: 14
- TV partner(s): Polsat Sport
- League champions: Jastrzębski Węgiel (2nd title)

Seasons
- ← 2019–20 2021–22 →

The 2020–21 PlusLiga was the 85th season of the Polish Volleyball Championship, the 68th season of the highest tier domestic division in the Polish volleyball league system since its establishment in 1954, and the 21st season as a professional league. The league is operated by the Polish Volleyball League SA (Polish: Polska Liga Siatkówki SA).

The season was composed of 14 teams. The regular season was played as a round-robin tournament. Each team played a total of 26 matches, half at home and half away. The season started on 11 September 2020 and concluded on 21 April 2021.

Jastrzębski Węgiel won their 2nd title of the Polish Champions.

== Regular season ==
Ranking system:

1. Points
2. Number of victories
3. Set ratio
4. Setpoint ratio
5. H2H results

Result	Winners	Losers
3–0	3 points	0 points
3–1	3 points	0 points
3–2	2 points	1 point

Pos	Team	Pld	W	L	Pts	SW	SL	SR	SPW	SPL	SPR	Qualification or relegation
1	ZAKSA Kędzierzyn-Koźle	26	23	3	70	73	21	3.476	2260	1928	1.172	Quarterfinals
2	Jastrzębski Węgiel	26	20	6	56	67	33	2.030	2344	2135	1.098	Quarterfinals
3	Trefl Gdańsk	26	17	9	50	58	40	1.450	2271	2145	1.059	Quarterfinals
4	PGE Skra Bełchatów	26	15	11	48	55	39	1.410	2200	2116	1.040	Quarterfinals
5	Asseco Resovia	26	17	9	46	57	44	1.295	2303	2208	1.043	Quarterfinals
6	Projekt Warsaw	26	16	10	45	58	48	1.208	2368	2283	1.037	Quarterfinals
7	Aluron CMC Warta Zawiercie	26	15	11	43	52	43	1.209	2176	2125	1.024	Quarterfinals
8	Ślepsk Malow Suwałki	26	12	14	36	45	50	0.900	2208	2225	0.992	Quarterfinals
9	Indykpol AZS Olsztyn	26	11	15	34	42	53	0.792	2154	2177	0.989	
10	GKS Katowice	26	11	15	33	46	57	0.807	2218	2338	0.949	
11	Cuprum Lubin	26	10	16	30	44	57	0.772	2216	2322	0.954	
12	Cerrad Enea Czarni Radom	26	8	18	24	35	63	0.556	2092	2292	0.913	
13	Stal Nysa	26	5	21	24	39	66	0.591	2224	2393	0.929	
14	MKS Będzin	26	2	24	7	18	75	0.240	1904	2251	0.846	Relegation

Source: PlusLiga

=== 1st round ===
Date	Time		Score		Set 1	Set 2	Set 3	Set 4	Set 5	Total	Report
11 Sep	17:30	Stal Nysa	0–3	ZAKSA Kędzierzyn-Koźle	19–25	13–25	16–25			48–75	
13 Sep	17:30	MKS Będzin	1–3	Projekt Warsaw	20–25	14–25	25–20	24–26		83–96	
12 Sep	17:30	Cuprum Lubin	1–3	PGE Skra Bełchatów	25–20	22–25	28–30	24–26		99–101	
13 Sep	20:30	Aluron CMC Warta Zawiercie	2–3	Jastrzębski Węgiel	21–25	25–19	25–19	25–27	12–15	108–105	
17 Jan	14:45	Asseco Resovia	3–2	Trefl Gdańsk	25–20	29–31	26–24	17–25	17–15	114–115	
12 Sep	14:45	Cerrad Enea Czarni Radom	3–2	Indykpol AZS Olsztyn	25–17	23–25	19–25	25–21	15–13	107–101	
12 Sep	20:30	Ślepsk Malow Suwałki	0–3	GKS Katowice	18–25	22–25	25–27			65–77	

=== 2nd round ===
Date	Time		Score		Set 1	Set 2	Set 3	Set 4	Set 5	Total	Report
21 Sep	20:30	GKS Katowice	3–2	Stal Nysa	23–25	20–25	25–21	25–18	15–12	108–101	
19 Sep	17:30	Indykpol AZS Olsztyn	0–3	Ślepsk Malow Suwałki	22–25	21–25	27–29			70–79	
20 Sep	20:30	Cerrad Enea Czarni Radom	0–3	Trefl Gdańsk	19–25	21–25	11–25			51–75	
19 Sep	14:45	Jastrzębski Węgiel	3–0	Asseco Resovia	25–21	25–16	25–18			75–55	
20 Sep	14:45	PGE Skra Bełchatów	1–3	Aluron CMC Warta Zawiercie	27–25	24–26	24–26	23–25		98–102	
18 Sep	20:30	Cuprum Lubin	2–3	Projekt Warsaw	25–20	25–23	18–25	21–25	12–15	101–108	
19 Sep	20:30	ZAKSA Kędzierzyn-Koźle	3–0	MKS Będzin	25–16	25–19	25–23			75–58	

=== 3rd round ===
Date	Time		Score		Set 1	Set 2	Set 3	Set 4	Set 5	Total	Report
5 Jan	17:30	Projekt Warsaw	3–2	Stal Nysa	25–10	22–25	23–25	25–22	20–18	115–100	
26 Sep	14:45	PGE Skra Bełchatów	1–3	ZAKSA Kędzierzyn-Koźle	25–23	21–25	17–25	23–25		86–98	
27 Sep	14:45	MKS Będzin	1–3	Jastrzębski Węgiel	25–22	15–25	18–25	18–25		76–97	
25 Sep	20:30	Trefl Gdańsk	3–1	Cuprum Lubin	16–25	25–18	25–15	25–18		91–76	
26 Sep	17:30	Indykpol AZS Olsztyn	0–3	Aluron CMC Warta Zawiercie	23–25	18–25	15–25			56–75	
25 Sep	17:30	GKS Katowice	2–3	Asseco Resovia	15–25	18–25	25–19	25–22	7–15	90–106	
28 Oct	17:30	Ślepsk Malow Suwałki	3–2	Cerrad Enea Czarni Radom	23–25	25–23	25–16	25–27	15–8	113–99	

=== 4th round ===
Date	Time		Score		Set 1	Set 2	Set 3	Set 4	Set 5	Total	Report
1 Oct	17:30	Stal Nysa	2–3	Cerrad Enea Czarni Radom	25–21	25–27	25–22	12–25	19–21	106–116	
17 Nov	17:30	Asseco Resovia	1–3	Ślepsk Malow Suwałki	25–19	23–25	21–25	21–25		90–94	
29 Sep	20:30	Aluron CMC Warta Zawiercie	3–0	GKS Katowice	25–21	25–16	25–23			75–60	
29 Sep	17:30	Cuprum Lubin	0–3	Indykpol AZS Olsztyn	22–25	20–25	21–25			63–75	
30 Sep	20:30	MKS Będzin	2–3	Trefl Gdańsk	25–23	21–25	20–25	25–22	11–15	102–110	
30 Sep	17:30	ZAKSA Kędzierzyn-Koźle	3–1	Jastrzębski Węgiel	25–20	27–29	25–23	25–20		102–92	
25 Nov	20:30	Projekt Warsaw	3–1	PGE Skra Bełchatów	23–25	25–11	29–27	25–23		102–86	

=== 5th round ===
Date	Time		Score		Set 1	Set 2	Set 3	Set 4	Set 5	Total	Report
5 Oct	20:30	PGE Skra Bełchatów	3–0	Stal Nysa	25–22	25–15	25–20			75–57	
12 Jan	20:30	Jastrzębski Węgiel	2–3	Projekt Warsaw	25–18	25–23	25–27	19–25	9–15	103–108	
3 Oct	20:30	Trefl Gdańsk	0–3	ZAKSA Kędzierzyn-Koźle	21–25	20–25	23–25			64–75	
18 Nov	17:30	GKS Katowice	2–3	Cuprum Lubin	23–25	21–25	25–23	25–21	13–15	107–109	
27 Jan	15:00	Aluron CMC Warta Zawiercie	3–1	Ślepsk Malow Suwałki	32–34	25–19	27–25	25–13		109–91	
4 Oct	17:30	Cerrad Enea Czarni Radom	2–3	Asseco Resovia	23–25	17–25	25–23	25–20	17–19	107–112	
18 Nov	18:00	Indykpol AZS Olsztyn	3–0	MKS Będzin	25–18	25–18	25–7			75–43	

=== 6th round ===
Date	Time		Score		Set 1	Set 2	Set 3	Set 4	Set 5	Total	Report
10 Oct	20:30	Stal Nysa	2–3	Asseco Resovia	22–25	25–19	25–22	18–25	12–15	102–106	
10 Oct	14:45	Aluron CMC Warta Zawiercie	3–0	Cerrad Enea Czarni Radom	25–21	25–20	25–22			75–63	
11 Oct	17:30	Cuprum Lubin	0–3	Ślepsk Malow Suwałki	19–25	22–25	20–25			61–75	
20 Oct	20:30	MKS Będzin	0–3	GKS Katowice	26–28	23–25	18–25			67–78	
10 Oct	17:30	ZAKSA Kędzierzyn-Koźle	3–1	Indykpol AZS Olsztyn	25–21	25–18	17–25	25–16		92–80	
28 Oct	20:30	Projekt Warsaw	1–3	Trefl Gdańsk	25–23	23–25	17–25	25–27		90–100	
16 Jan	14:45	PGE Skra Bełchatów	0–3	Jastrzębski Węgiel	25–27	23–25	18–25			66–77	

=== 7th round ===
Date	Time		Score		Set 1	Set 2	Set 3	Set 4	Set 5	Total	Report
2 Feb	15:00	Jastrzębski Węgiel	3–0	Stal Nysa	27–25	25–19	25–20			77–64	
14 Oct	20:30	Trefl Gdańsk	1–3	PGE Skra Bełchatów	25–23	23–25	20–25	15–25		83–98	
15 Oct	17:30	Indykpol AZS Olsztyn	3–2	Projekt Warsaw	22–25	25–22	21–25	25–14	15–13	108–99	
10 Jan	14:45	ZAKSA Kędzierzyn-Koźle	3–0	GKS Katowice	25–16	26–24	25–16			76–56	
11 Nov	20:30	MKS Będzin	0–3	Ślepsk Malow Suwałki	22–25	23–25	20–25			65–75	
4 Nov	20:30	Cerrad Enea Czarni Radom	3–1	Cuprum Lubin	16–25	27–25	25–22	25–19		93–91	
2 Dec	17:30	Asseco Resovia	3–0	Aluron CMC Warta Zawiercie	25–18	25–23	26–24			76–65	

=== 8th round ===
Date	Time		Score		Set 1	Set 2	Set 3	Set 4	Set 5	Total	Report
24 Oct	17:30	Jastrzębski Węgiel	3–0	Trefl Gdańsk	25–19	25–19	33–31			83–69	
16 Dec	17:30	PGE Skra Bełchatów	3–0	Indykpol AZS Olsztyn	25–17	25–21	25–22			75–60	
18 Oct	14:45	Projekt Warsaw	3–1	GKS Katowice	21–25	25–11	25–22	25–16		96–74	
31 Oct	14:45	Ślepsk Malow Suwałki	0–3	ZAKSA Kędzierzyn-Koźle	24–26	23–25	19–25			66–76	
3 Dec	17:30	MKS Będzin	1–3	Cerrad Enea Czarni Radom	23–25	25–18	23–25	17–25		88–93	
9 Dec	17:30	Cuprum Lubin	3–1	Asseco Resovia	25–21	21–25	25–23	25–23		96–92	
17 Nov	20:30	Aluron CMC Warta Zawiercie	1–3	Stal Nysa	25–22	22–25	20–25	22–25		89–97	

=== 9th round ===
Date	Time		Score		Set 1	Set 2	Set 3	Set 4	Set 5	Total	Report
15 Dec	17:30	Aluron CMC Warta Zawiercie	3–0	Cuprum Lubin	25–23	25–14	25–19			75–56	
7 Jan	17:30	MKS Będzin	1–3	Asseco Resovia	21–25	25–23	20–25	16–25		82–98	
13 Jan	20:30	Cerrad Enea Czarni Radom	0–3	ZAKSA Kędzierzyn-Koźle	19–25	14–25	17–25			50–75	
23 Oct	20:30	Ślepsk Malow Suwałki	1–3	Projekt Warsaw	25–20	22–25	16–25	23–25		86–95	
3 Jan	14:45	GKS Katowice	0–3	PGE Skra Bełchatów	19–25	22–25	31–33			72–83	
20 Jan	17:30	Indykpol AZS Olsztyn	3–1	Jastrzębski Węgiel	15–25	27–25	26–24	25–16		93–90	
15 Dec	20:30	Trefl Gdańsk	3–0	Stal Nysa	25–19	26–24	25–16			76–59	

=== 10th round ===
Date	Time		Score		Set 1	Set 2	Set 3	Set 4	Set 5	Total	Report
4 Feb	15:00	Trefl Gdańsk	3–1	Indykpol AZS Olsztyn	21–25	25–22	25–22	25–21		96–90	
6 Jan	17:30	Jastrzębski Węgiel	3–0	GKS Katowice	26–24	25–18	25–18			76–60	
1 Feb	17:30	PGE Skra Bełchatów	3–0	Ślepsk Malow Suwałki	25–17	26–24	25–15			76–56	
31 Oct	20:30	Projekt Warsaw	0–3	Cerrad Enea Czarni Radom	17–25	23–25	19–25			59–75	
31 Jan	14:45	ZAKSA Kędzierzyn-Koźle	2–3	Asseco Resovia	19–25	21–25	25–17	25–19	14–16	104–102	
7 Dec	20:30	MKS Będzin	1–3	Aluron CMC Warta Zawiercie	25–19	23–25	23–25	17–25		88–94	
19 Jan	17:30	Stal Nysa	1–3	Cuprum Lubin	25–20	23–25	29–31	16–25		93–101	

=== 11th round ===
Date	Time		Score		Set 1	Set 2	Set 3	Set 4	Set 5	Total	Report
1 Nov	17:30	MKS Będzin	3–1	Cuprum Lubin	25–20	25–23	20–25	25–21		95–89	
19 Jan	20:30	Aluron CMC Warta Zawiercie	1–3	ZAKSA Kędzierzyn-Koźle	21–25	25–23	13–25	19–25		78–98	
29 Dec	20:30	PGE Skra Bełchatów	3–0	Cerrad Enea Czarni Radom	27–25	25–22	25–12			77–59	
4 Nov	17:30	Ślepsk Malow Suwałki	1–3	Jastrzębski Węgiel	17–25	25–18	22–25	22–25		86–93	
20 Jan	20:30	GKS Katowice	3–2	Trefl Gdańsk	15–25	25–23	25–19	19–25	15–11	99–103	
14 Jan	17:30	Indykpol AZS Olsztyn	3–1	Stal Nysa	25–19	25–22	20–25	25–20		95–86	
28 Jan	15:00	Asseco Resovia	2–3	Projekt Warsaw	25–22	27–25	22–25	23–25	10–15	107–112	

=== 12th round ===
Date	Time		Score		Set 1	Set 2	Set 3	Set 4	Set 5	Total	Report
9 Nov	17:30	Stal Nysa	2–3	MKS Będzin	21–25	25–17	25–22	24–26	12–15	107–105	
27 Oct	17:30	Cuprum Lubin	1–3	ZAKSA Kędzierzyn-Koźle	15–25	25–21	20–25	16–25		76–96	
8 Nov	20:30	Projekt Warsaw	0–3	Aluron CMC Warta Zawiercie	18–25	20–25	23–25			61–75	
13 Jan	17:30	PGE Skra Bełchatów	2–3	Asseco Resovia	17–25	16–25	25–16	25–23	11–15	94–104	
7 Nov	17:30	Jastrzębski Węgiel	3–1	Cerrad Enea Czarni Radom	25–17	25–17	24–26	25–17		99–77	
7 Nov	20:30	Trefl Gdańsk	3–0	Ślepsk Malow Suwałki	36–34	25–14	25–20			86–68	
10 Feb	18:00	Indykpol AZS Olsztyn	3–1	GKS Katowice	25–18	22–25	25–23	25–16		97–82	

=== 13th round ===
Date	Time		Score		Set 1	Set 2	Set 3	Set 4	Set 5	Total	Report
30 Dec	17:30	Projekt Warsaw	1–3	ZAKSA Kędzierzyn-Koźle	17–25	22–25	25–23	16–25		80–98	
15 Nov	14:45	MKS Będzin	0–3	PGE Skra Bełchatów	17–25	17–25	22–25			56–75	
15 Nov	20:30	Jastrzębski Węgiel	3–0	Cuprum Lubin	25–17	25–15	28–26			78–58	
15 Nov	17:30	Aluron CMC Warta Zawiercie	0–3	Trefl Gdańsk	22–25	21–25	23–25			66–75	
13 Nov	20:30	Asseco Resovia	3–1	Indykpol AZS Olsztyn	29–27	23–25	25–13	25–23		102–88	
14 Nov	14:45	Cerrad Enea Czarni Radom	0–3	GKS Katowice	16–25	16–25	21–25			53–75	
14 Nov	20:30	Stal Nysa	1–3	Ślepsk Malow Suwałki	23–25	25–23	20–25	22–25		90–98	

=== 14th round ===
Date	Time		Score		Set 1	Set 2	Set 3	Set 4	Set 5	Total	Report
21 Nov	20:30	GKS Katowice	3–1	Ślepsk Malow Suwałki	28–26	23–25	25–21	25–23		101–95	
22 Nov	14:45	Indykpol AZS Olsztyn	3–1	Cerrad Enea Czarni Radom	25–19	26–28	25–21	25–20		101–88	
22 Nov	17:30	Trefl Gdańsk	3–0	Asseco Resovia	25–18	26–24	25–20			76–62	
24 Feb	15:00	Jastrzębski Węgiel	1–3	Aluron CMC Warta Zawiercie	19–25	25–20	20–25	13–25		77–95	
21 Nov	17:30	PGE Skra Bełchatów	0–3	Cuprum Lubin	22–25	18–25	21–25			61–75	
22 Nov	20:30	Projekt Warsaw	3–0	MKS Będzin	25–22	27–25	25–17			77–64	
21 Nov	14:45	ZAKSA Kędzierzyn-Koźle	3–0	Stal Nysa	25–21	25–13	25–19			75–53	

=== 15th round ===
Date	Time		Score		Set 1	Set 2	Set 3	Set 4	Set 5	Total	Report
29 Nov	20:30	Stal Nysa	2–3	GKS Katowice	25–18	21–25	25–20	23–25	11–15	105–103	
1 Dec	17:30	Ślepsk Malow Suwałki	1–3	Indykpol AZS Olsztyn	19–25	26–28	25–19	14–25		84–97	
28 Nov	17:30	Trefl Gdańsk	3–1	Cerrad Enea Czarni Radom	28–30	25–12	25–18	25–17		103–77	
30 Dec	20:30	Asseco Resovia	0–3	Jastrzębski Węgiel	23–25	18–25	22–25			63–75	
29 Nov	14:45	Aluron CMC Warta Zawiercie	0–3	PGE Skra Bełchatów	15–25	22–25	19–25			56–75	
29 Nov	17:30	Projekt Warsaw	3–1	Cuprum Lubin	25–19	25–15	19–25	25–23		94–82	
28 Nov	20:30	MKS Będzin	1–3	ZAKSA Kędzierzyn-Koźle	25–21	24–26	23–25	17–25		89–97	

=== 16th round ===
Date	Time		Score		Set 1	Set 2	Set 3	Set 4	Set 5	Total	Report
4 Dec	20:30	Stal Nysa	2–3	Projekt Warsaw	25–21	23–25	15–25	25–21	10–15	98–107	
4 Dec	17:30	ZAKSA Kędzierzyn-Koźle	3–2	PGE Skra Bełchatów	22–25	25–23	25–13	26–28	15–7	113–96	
16 Dec	18:00	Jastrzębski Węgiel	3–1	MKS Będzin	25–17	23–25	25–23	25–14		98–79	
5 Dec	17:30	Cuprum Lubin	2–3	Trefl Gdańsk	23–25	25–20	27–25	18–25	16–18	109–113	
5 Dec	14:45	Aluron CMC Warta Zawiercie	3–0	Indykpol AZS Olsztyn	25–23	25–23	25–20			75–66	
6 Dec	14:45	Asseco Resovia	3–0	GKS Katowice	25–13	25–23	25–19			75–55	
20 Oct	17:30	Cerrad Enea Czarni Radom	0–3	Ślepsk Malow Suwałki	24–26	23–25	28–30			75–81	

=== 17th round ===
Date	Time		Score		Set 1	Set 2	Set 3	Set 4	Set 5	Total	Report
28 Feb	14:45	PGE Skra Bełchatów	3–1	Projekt Warsaw	17–25	25–20	29–27	25–19		96–91	
13 Dec	17:30	Jastrzębski Węgiel	1–3	ZAKSA Kędzierzyn-Koźle	23–25	25–27	25–23	22–25		95–100	
12 Dec	17:30	Trefl Gdańsk	3–0	MKS Będzin	25–21	25–15	25–16			75–52	
8 Nov	14:45	Indykpol AZS Olsztyn	0–3	Cuprum Lubin	19–25	22–25	22–25			63–75	
12 Dec	14:45	GKS Katowice	3–1	Aluron CMC Warta Zawiercie	28–26	25–15	20–25	26–24		99–90	
14 Dec	17:30	Ślepsk Malow Suwałki	3–1	Asseco Resovia	25–12	25–21	21–25	25–23		96–81	
11 Dec	20:30	Cerrad Enea Czarni Radom	3–1	Stal Nysa	25–19	20–25	25–18	25–23		95–85	

=== 18th round ===
Date	Time		Score		Set 1	Set 2	Set 3	Set 4	Set 5	Total	Report
20 Dec	20:30	Asseco Resovia	3–0	Cerrad Enea Czarni Radom	32–30	25–21	25–20			82–71	
18 Dec	20:30	Ślepsk Malow Suwałki	0–3	Aluron CMC Warta Zawiercie	24–26	22–25	17–25			63–76	
19 Dec	20:30	Cuprum Lubin	2–3	GKS Katowice	24–26	27–25	25–23	18–25	13–15	107–114	
19 Dec	17:30	MKS Będzin	0–3	Indykpol AZS Olsztyn	19–25	23–25	21–25			63–75	
19 Dec	14:45	ZAKSA Kędzierzyn-Koźle	3–0	Trefl Gdańsk	25–17	25–22	25–22			75–61	
20 Dec	14:45	Projekt Warsaw	2–3	Jastrzębski Węgiel	21–25	17–25	25–17	25–20	9–15	97–102	
20 Dec	17:30	Stal Nysa	3–0	PGE Skra Bełchatów	25–20	25–22	26–24			76–66	

=== 19th round ===
Date	Time		Score		Set 1	Set 2	Set 3	Set 4	Set 5	Total	Report
23 Dec	17:30	Jastrzębski Węgiel	3–2	PGE Skra Bełchatów	22–25	25–21	25–22	21–25	15–8	108–101	
3 Nov	20:30	Trefl Gdańsk	3–2	Projekt Warsaw	25–17	25–27	14–25	25–21	15–11	104–101	
22 Dec	17:30	Indykpol AZS Olsztyn	0–3	ZAKSA Kędzierzyn-Koźle	25–27	17–25	16–25			58–77	
22 Dec	17:00	GKS Katowice	3–1	MKS Będzin	25–21	25–19	24–26	25–22		99–88	
22 Dec	20:30	Ślepsk Malow Suwałki	3–1	Cuprum Lubin	25–22	23–25	25–21	25–18		98–86	
23 Dec	20:30	Cerrad Enea Czarni Radom	2–3	Aluron CMC Warta Zawiercie	26–24	25–13	20–25	23–25	12–15	106–102	
17 Oct	20:30	Asseco Resovia	3–1	Stal Nysa	25–19	21–25	25–17	25–18		96–79	

=== 20th round ===
Date	Time		Score		Set 1	Set 2	Set 3	Set 4	Set 5	Total	Report
28 Feb	17:30	Ślepsk Malow Suwałki	3–0	MKS Będzin	25–20	25–19	25–17			75–56	
9 Feb	20:30	Aluron CMC Warta Zawiercie	0–3	Asseco Resovia	22–25	19–25	20–25			61–75	
9 Jan	17:30	Projekt Warsaw	3–0	Indykpol AZS Olsztyn	25–19	26–24	25–20			76–63	
14 Feb	14:45	GKS Katowice	1–3	ZAKSA Kędzierzyn-Koźle	20–25	19–25	25–19	23–25		87–94	
10 Jan	20:30	Cuprum Lubin	3–0	Cerrad Enea Czarni Radom	25–21	25–17	26–24			76–62	
9 Jan	14:45	PGE Skra Bełchatów	1–3	Trefl Gdańsk	18–25	25–18	29–31	21–25		93–99	
9 Jan	20:30	Stal Nysa	3–1	Jastrzębski Węgiel	18–25	25–18	25–18	25–23		93–84	

=== 21st round ===
Date	Time		Score		Set 1	Set 2	Set 3	Set 4	Set 5	Total	Report
1 Nov	14:45	Trefl Gdańsk	1–3	Jastrzębski Węgiel	25–20	21–25	17–25	18–25		81–95	
13 Feb	14:45	Indykpol AZS Olsztyn	0–3	PGE Skra Bełchatów	23–25	38–40	16–25			77–90	
17 Jan	17:30	GKS Katowice	0–3	Projekt Warsaw	25–27	10–25	19–25			54–77	
16 Jan	17:30	ZAKSA Kędzierzyn-Koźle	3–1	Ślepsk Malow Suwałki	26–24	26–24	23–25	25–23		100–96	
17 Jan	20:30	Cerrad Enea Czarni Radom	3–0	MKS Będzin	29–27	25–20	26–24			80–71	
13 Feb	17:30	Asseco Resovia	3–1	Cuprum Lubin	25–16	25–27	25–17	25–23		100–83	
27 Feb	20:30	Stal Nysa	2–3	Aluron CMC Warta Zawiercie	23–25	19–25	25–23	25–21	11–15	103–109	

=== 22nd round ===
Date	Time		Score		Set 1	Set 2	Set 3	Set 4	Set 5	Total	Report
23 Jan	17:30	Stal Nysa	0–3	Trefl Gdańsk	18–25	19–25	23–25			60–75	
23 Jan	14:45	Jastrzębski Węgiel	3–2	Indykpol AZS Olsztyn	21–25	20–25	27–25	26–24	15–9	109–108	
22 Jan	17:30	PGE Skra Bełchatów	3–1	GKS Katowice	25–19	25–16	18–25	25–20		93–80	
24 Jan	14:45	Projekt Warsaw	3–2	Ślepsk Malow Suwałki	28–26	19–25	26–28	25–22	15–13	113–114	
11 Feb	14:30	ZAKSA Kędzierzyn-Koźle	3–0	Cerrad Enea Czarni Radom	25–19	25–18	25–20			75–57	
23 Jan	20:30	Asseco Resovia	3–0	MKS Będzin	25–20	27–25	25–23			77–68	
24 Jan	17:30	Cuprum Lubin	3–1	Aluron CMC Warta Zawiercie	30–28	25–22	18–25	28–26		101–101	

=== 23rd round ===
Date	Time		Score		Set 1	Set 2	Set 3	Set 4	Set 5	Total	Report
31 Jan	17:30	Indykpol AZS Olsztyn	3–0	Trefl Gdańsk	25–21	25–21	25–17			75–59	
30 Jan	17:30	GKS Katowice	2–3	Jastrzębski Węgiel	23–25	25–23	20–25	28–26	9–15	105–114	
10 Feb	14:30	Ślepsk Malow Suwałki	1–3	PGE Skra Bełchatów	25–23	22–25	22–25	24–26		93–99	
30 Jan	14:45	Cerrad Enea Czarni Radom	1–3	Projekt Warsaw	22–25	25–22	20–25	17–25		84–97	
3 Feb	15:00	Asseco Resovia	0–3	ZAKSA Kędzierzyn-Koźle	19–25	18–25	21–25			58–75	
29 Jan	20:30	Aluron CMC Warta Zawiercie	3–2	MKS Będzin	25–23	23–25	21–25	25–14	17–15	111–102	
30 Jan	20:30	Cuprum Lubin	3–2	Stal Nysa	25–20	23–25	25–23	14–25	15–10	102–103	

=== 24th round ===
Date	Time		Score		Set 1	Set 2	Set 3	Set 4	Set 5	Total	Report
6 Feb	20:30	Stal Nysa	3–1	Indykpol AZS Olsztyn	30–28	25–22	22–25	25–23		102–98	
7 Feb	20:30	Trefl Gdańsk	3–1	GKS Katowice	21–25	25–22	25–23	25–21		96–91	
5 Feb	20:30	Jastrzębski Węgiel	3–0	Ślepsk Malow Suwałki	32–30	27–25	25–13			84–68	
7 Feb	14:45	Cerrad Enea Czarni Radom	1–3	PGE Skra Bełchatów	18–25	23–25	26–24	16–25		83–99	
6 Feb	14:45	Projekt Warsaw	1–3	Asseco Resovia	22–25	25–22	17–25	16–25		80–97	
6 Feb	17:30	ZAKSA Kędzierzyn-Koźle	0–3	Aluron CMC Warta Zawiercie	18–25	23–25	19–25			60–75	
8 Feb	17:30	Cuprum Lubin	3–0	MKS Będzin	25–11	25–20	25–20			75–51	

=== 25th round ===
Date	Time		Score		Set 1	Set 2	Set 3	Set 4	Set 5	Total	Report
27 Feb	17:30	ZAKSA Kędzierzyn-Koźle	2–3	Cuprum Lubin	25–20	25–21	20–25	23–25	11–15	104–106	
21 Feb	20:30	Aluron CMC Warta Zawiercie	0–3	Projekt Warsaw	21–25	13–25	20–25			54–75	
20 Feb	20:30	Asseco Resovia	3–0	PGE Skra Bełchatów	25–15	26–24	29–27			80–66	
21 Feb	17:30	Cerrad Enea Czarni Radom	0–3	Jastrzębski Węgiel	27–29	18–25	15–25			60–79	
22 Feb	17:30	Ślepsk Malow Suwałki	3–1	Trefl Gdańsk	25–21	26–24	23–25	25–18		99–88	
27 Feb	14:45	GKS Katowice	3–1	Indykpol AZS Olsztyn	25–20	25–22	22–25	25–20		97–87	
19 Feb	20:30	MKS Będzin	0–3	Stal Nysa	23–25	12–25	18–25			53–75	

=== 26th round ===
Date	Time		Score		Set 1	Set 2	Set 3	Set 4	Set 5	Total	Report
7 Mar	14:45	ZAKSA Kędzierzyn-Koźle	3–0	Projekt Warsaw	25–20	25–20	25–22			75–62	
9 Mar	17:30	PGE Skra Bełchatów	3–0	MKS Będzin	25–23	25–16	25–21			75–60	
5 Mar	20:30	Cuprum Lubin	0–3	Jastrzębski Węgiel	25–27	25–27	13–25			63–79	
7 Mar	17:30	Trefl Gdańsk	3–1	Aluron CMC Warta Zawiercie	25–21	25–15	23–25	26–24		99–85	
8 Mar	20:30	Indykpol AZS Olsztyn	3–1	Asseco Resovia	29–27	25–23	19–25	25–18		98–93	
6 Mar	20:30	GKS Katowice	2–3	Cerrad Enea Czarni Radom	25–21	26–24	17–25	18–25	9–15	95–110	
6 Mar	14:45	Ślepsk Malow Suwałki	3–1	Stal Nysa	25–17	25–20	19–25	25–20		94–82	

== Playoffs ==
Quarterfinals
1	ZAKSA Kędzierzyn-Koźle	2
8	Ślepsk Malow Suwałki	0
5	Asseco Resovia	0
4	PGE Skra Bełchatów	2
3	Trefl Gdańsk	1
6	Projekt Warsaw	2
7	Aluron CMC Warta Zawiercie	0
2	Jastrzębski Węgiel	2

Semifinals
1	ZAKSA Kędzierzyn-Koźle	2
4	PGE Skra Bełchatów	1
6	Projekt Warsaw	0
2	Jastrzębski Węgiel	2

Finals
1	ZAKSA Kędzierzyn-Koźle	0
2	Jastrzębski Węgiel	2

=== Quarterfinals ===
- (to 2 victories)

==== Quarterfinal A ====
Date	Time		Score		Set 1	Set 2	Set 3	Set 4	Set 5	Total	Report
21 Mar	14:45	ZAKSA Kędzierzyn-Koźle	3–1	Ślepsk Malow Suwałki	17–25	25–16	25–16	25–21		92–78	
28 Mar	14:45	Ślepsk Malow Suwałki	1–3	ZAKSA Kędzierzyn-Koźle	25–20	20–25	21–25	21–25		87–95	

==== Quarterfinal B ====
Date	Time		Score		Set 1	Set 2	Set 3	Set 4	Set 5	Total	Report
21 Mar	20:30	Jastrzębski Węgiel	3–0	Aluron CMC Warta Zawiercie	25–23	25–21	25–18			75–62	
27 Mar	14:45	Aluron CMC Warta Zawiercie	1–3	Jastrzębski Węgiel	26–24	18–25	23–25	22–25		89–99	

==== Quarterfinal C ====
Date	Time		Score		Set 1	Set 2	Set 3	Set 4	Set 5	Total	Report
20 Mar	14:45	Trefl Gdańsk	3–1	Projekt Warsaw	25–18	25–20	21–25	25–22		96–85	
27 Mar	17:30	Projekt Warsaw	3–2	Trefl Gdańsk	25–22	25–23	21–25	21–25	15–13	107–108	
31 Mar	18:00	Trefl Gdańsk	0–3	Projekt Warsaw	21–25	19–25	18–25			58–75	

==== Quarterfinal D ====
Date	Time		Score		Set 1	Set 2	Set 3	Set 4	Set 5	Total	Report
20 Mar	20:30	PGE Skra Bełchatów	3–1	Asseco Resovia	25–23	11–25	25–20	25–19		86–87	
27 Mar	20:30	Asseco Resovia	0–3	PGE Skra Bełchatów	20–25	21–25	22–25			63–75	

=== Semifinals ===
- (to 2 victories)

==== Semifinal A ====
Date	Time		Score		Set 1	Set 2	Set 3	Set 4	Set 5	Total	Report
3 Apr	14:45	ZAKSA Kędzierzyn-Koźle	3–0	PGE Skra Bełchatów	25–23	25–17	25–20			75–60	
7 Apr	20:30	PGE Skra Bełchatów	3–1	ZAKSA Kędzierzyn-Koźle	31–29	17–25	27–25	25–20		100–99	
11 Apr	14:45	ZAKSA Kędzierzyn-Koźle	3–0	PGE Skra Bełchatów	25–23	25–19	25–21			75–63	

==== Semifinal B ====
Date	Time		Score		Set 1	Set 2	Set 3	Set 4	Set 5	Total	Report
3 Apr	17:30	Jastrzębski Węgiel	3–2	Projekt Warsaw	25–20	23–25	25–23	22–25	15–12	110–105	
7 Apr	17:30	Projekt Warsaw	1–3	Jastrzębski Węgiel	29–27	27–29	20–25	24–26		100–107	

=== Finals ===
- (to 2 victories)

Date	Time		Score		Set 1	Set 2	Set 3	Set 4	Set 5	Total	Report
14 Apr	20:30	ZAKSA Kędzierzyn-Koźle	1–3	Jastrzębski Węgiel	25–16	23–25	19–25	21–25		88–91	
18 Apr	17:30	Jastrzębski Węgiel	3–1	ZAKSA Kędzierzyn-Koźle	22–25	25–19	27–25	25–23		99–92	

== Placement matches ==
- (to 2 victories)

=== 11th place ===
Date	Time		Score		Set 1	Set 2	Set 3	Set 4	Set 5	Total	Report
19 Mar	20:30	Cerrad Enea Czarni Radom	3–0	Cuprum Lubin	25–21	25–22	25–13			75–56	
28 Mar	20:30	Cuprum Lubin	3–0	Cerrad Enea Czarni Radom	25–19	25–17	25–21			75–57	
Golden set		Cuprum Lubin	15–12	Cerrad Enea Czarni Radom							

=== 9th place ===
Date	Time		Score		Set 1	Set 2	Set 3	Set 4	Set 5	Total	Report
22 Mar	20:30	GKS Katowice	3–1	Indykpol AZS Olsztyn	25–20	27–25	21–25	25–22		98–92	
26 Mar	17:30	Indykpol AZS Olsztyn	2–3	GKS Katowice	26–28	25–18	25–14	25–27	16–18	117–105	

=== 7th place ===
Date	Time		Score		Set 1	Set 2	Set 3	Set 4	Set 5	Total	Report
2 Apr	20:30	Ślepsk Malow Suwałki	3–1	Aluron CMC Warta Zawiercie	26–28	25–18	25–21	25–19		101–86	
8 Apr	20:30	Aluron CMC Warta Zawiercie	3–1	Ślepsk Malow Suwałki	22–25	25–19	25–22	25–23		97–89	
Golden set		Aluron CMC Warta Zawiercie	10–15	Ślepsk Malow Suwałki							

=== 5th place ===
Date	Time		Score		Set 1	Set 2	Set 3	Set 4	Set 5	Total	Report
3 Apr	20:30	Asseco Resovia	3–1	Trefl Gdańsk	25–23	22–25	25–22	25–19		97–89	
8 Apr	17:30	Trefl Gdańsk	0–3	Asseco Resovia	30–32	18–25	26–28			74–85	

=== 3rd place ===
Date	Time		Score		Set 1	Set 2	Set 3	Set 4	Set 5	Total	Report
14 Apr	17:30	PGE Skra Bełchatów	2–3	Projekt Warsaw	25–15	20–25	25–11	19–25	19–21	108–97	
18 Apr	14:45	Projekt Warsaw	1–3	PGE Skra Bełchatów	25–13	21–25	22–25	23–25		91–88	
21 Apr	17:30	PGE Skra Bełchatów	0–3	Projekt Warsaw	20–25	20–25	22–25			62–75	

== Final standings ==
Qualified for the 2021–22 CEV Champions League
Qualified for the 2021–22 CEV Cup
Relegation to the 1st league

Rank	Team
1st place, gold medalist(s)	Jastrzębski Węgiel
2nd place, silver medalist(s)	ZAKSA Kędzierzyn-Koźle
3rd place, bronze medalist(s)	Projekt Warsaw
4	PGE Skra Bełchatów
5	Asseco Resovia
6	Trefl Gdańsk
7	Ślepsk Malow Suwałki
8	Aluron CMC Warta Zawiercie
9	GKS Katowice
10	Indykpol AZS Olsztyn
11	Cuprum Lubin
12	Cerrad Enea Czarni Radom
13	Stal Nysa
14	MKS Będzin

2021 Polish champions
Jastrzębski Węgiel
2nd title

== Squads ==
Aluron CMC Warta Zawiercie
No.	Name	Date of birth	Height	Position
1	(North Macedonia) Gjorgi Gjorgiev	22 May 1992	1.97 m (6 ft 6 in)	setter
3	(Poland) Michał Żurek	3 June 1988	1.81 m (5 ft 11 in)	libero
5	(Poland) Patryk Niemiec	18 February 1997	2.02 m (6 ft 8 in)	middle blocker
6	(Poland) Mateusz Malinowski	6 May 1992	1.98 m (6 ft 6 in)	opposite
7	(Poland) Dominik Depowski	27 October 1995	2.00 m (6 ft 7 in)	outside hitter
9	(Poland) Krzysztof Andrzejewski	26 January 1983	1.80 m (5 ft 11 in)	libero
11	(Poland) Marcin Kania	14 February 1996	2.03 m (6 ft 8 in)	middle blocker
12	(Poland) Grzegorz Bociek	6 June 1991	2.07 m (6 ft 9 in)	opposite
13	(Brazil) Flávio Gualberto	22 April 1993	2.00 m (6 ft 7 in)	middle blocker
14	(Argentina) Maximiliano Cavanna	2 July 1988	1.88 m (6 ft 2 in)	setter
15	(Poland) Paweł Halaba	14 December 1995	1.94 m (6 ft 4 in)	outside hitter
17	(Poland) Piotr Orczyk	19 March 1993	1.98 m (6 ft 6 in)	outside hitter
18	(United States) Garrett Muagututia	26 February 1988	1.96 m (6 ft 5 in)	outside hitter
19	(Poland) Patryk Czarnowski	1 November 1985	2.04 m (6 ft 8 in)	middle blocker
Head coach:		(Montenegro) Igor Kolaković		

Asseco Resovia
No.	Name	Date of birth	Height	Position
1	(Poland) Bartłomiej Krulicki	15 September 1993	2.05 m (6 ft 9 in)	middle blocker
3	(Italy) Simone Parodi	16 June 1986	1.96 m (6 ft 5 in)	outside hitter
9	(Poland) Nicolas Szerszeń	31 December 1996	1.95 m (6 ft 5 in)	outside hitter
10	(Poland) Damian Domagała	23 April 1998	1.99 m (6 ft 6 in)	opposite
11	(Poland) Fabian Drzyzga	3 January 1990	1.96 m (6 ft 5 in)	setter
12	(Poland) Paweł Woicki	19 June 1983	1.82 m (6 ft 0 in)	setter
13	(Poland) Michał Potera	6 March 1988	1.83 m (6 ft 0 in)	libero
14	(Poland) Rafał Buszek	28 April 1987	1.96 m (6 ft 5 in)	outside hitter
15	(United States) Jeffrey Jendryk	15 September 1995	2.05 m (6 ft 9 in)	middle blocker
16	(Poland) Piotr Hain	26 February 1991	2.07 m (6 ft 9 in)	middle blocker
18	(Slovenia) Klemen Čebulj	21 February 1992	2.03 m (6 ft 8 in)	outside hitter
21	(Poland) Karol Butryn	18 June 1993	1.94 m (6 ft 4 in)	opposite
23	(Poland) Bartosz Mariański	26 May 1992	1.87 m (6 ft 2 in)	libero
24	(Estonia) Robert Täht	15 August 1993	1.92 m (6 ft 4 in)	outside hitter
48	(Estonia) Timo Tammemaa	18 November 1991	2.05 m (6 ft 9 in)	middle blocker
Head coach:		(Italy) Alberto Giuliani		

Cerrad Enea Czarni Radom
No.	Name	Date of birth	Height	Position
1	(Poland) Dawid Dryja	21 July 1992	2.01 m (6 ft 7 in)	middle blocker
2	(Poland) Michał Ostrowski	29 March 1990	2.03 m (6 ft 8 in)	middle blocker
3	(Poland) Michał Kędzierski	9 August 1994	1.94 m (6 ft 4 in)	setter
5	(Poland) Bartłomiej Grzechnik	8 February 1993	2.00 m (6 ft 7 in)	middle blocker
6	(Poland) Dawid Konarski	31 August 1989	1.98 m (6 ft 6 in)	opposite
7	(Brazil) Lucas Lóh	18 January 1991	1.95 m (6 ft 5 in)	outside hitter
9	(Poland) Daniel Gąsior	9 January 1995	2.00 m (6 ft 7 in)	opposite
11	(Bulgaria) Viktor Yosifov	16 October 1985	2.05 m (6 ft 9 in)	middle blocker
12	(Poland) Bartosz Zrajkowski	30 April 1986	1.91 m (6 ft 3 in)	setter
13	(Poland) Mateusz Masłowski	13 June 1997	1.85 m (6 ft 1 in)	libero
14	(Poland) Artur Pasiński	29 March 1996	1.98 m (6 ft 6 in)	outside hitter
15	(United States) Brenden Sander	22 December 1995	1.95 m (6 ft 5 in)	outside hitter
17	(Poland) Bartosz Firszt	19 March 1999	1.98 m (6 ft 6 in)	outside hitter
18	(Poland) Maciej Nowowsiak	20 September 2001	1.88 m (6 ft 2 in)	libero
Head coach:		(Poland) Robert Prygiel → (Russia) Dmitry Skoryy		

Cuprum Lubin
No.	Name	Date of birth	Height	Position
2	(Poland) Kamil Maruszczyk	13 January 1993	1.91 m (6 ft 3 in)	outside hitter
4	(Poland) Dawid Gunia	1 January 1987	2.03 m (6 ft 8 in)	middle blocker
5	(Poland) Wojciech Ferens	5 April 1991	1.94 m (6 ft 4 in)	outside hitter
6	(Poland) Bartłomiej Zawalski	13 February 1999	2.04 m (6 ft 8 in)	middle blocker
7	(Poland) Adam Lorenc	30 October 1998	1.97 m (6 ft 6 in)	opposite
9	(Poland) Paweł Pietraszko	5 October 1990	2.03 m (6 ft 8 in)	middle blocker
10	(Brazil) Daniel Muniz de Oliveira	21 August 1997	1.94 m (6 ft 4 in)	outside hitter
11	(Poland) Szymon Jakubiszak	13 February 1998	2.08 m (6 ft 10 in)	outside hitter
12	(Poland) Przemysław Smoliński	27 November 1992	2.01 m (6 ft 7 in)	middle blocker
13	(Colombia) Ronald Jiménez	9 January 1990	2.00 m (6 ft 7 in)	opposite
14	(Poland) Mariusz Magnuszewski	14 September 1997	1.94 m (6 ft 4 in)	setter
15	(Portugal) Miguel Tavares	2 March 1993	1.92 m (6 ft 4 in)	setter
16	(Poland) Bartosz Makoś	1 August 1998	1.76 m (5 ft 9 in)	libero
17	(Bulgaria) Nikolay Penchev	22 May 1992	1.96 m (6 ft 5 in)	outside hitter
20	(Poland) Kamil Szymura	24 January 1999	1.85 m (6 ft 1 in)	libero
Head coach:		(Brazil) Marcelo Fronckowiak		

GKS Katowice
No.	Name	Date of birth	Height	Position
1	(Poland) Jan Nowakowski	17 May 1994	2.02 m (6 ft 8 in)	middle blocker
2	(Poland) Jakub Szymański	25 March 1998	2.00 m (6 ft 7 in)	outside hitter
3	(Poland) Wiktor Musiał	30 March 1993	1.94 m (6 ft 4 in)	opposite
5	(Poland) Miłosz Zniszczoł	2 July 1986	2.01 m (6 ft 7 in)	middle blocker
7	(Poland) Jakub Jarosz	10 February 1987	1.97 m (6 ft 6 in)	opposite
9	(Poland) Sławomir Stolc	23 January 1993	1.98 m (6 ft 6 in)	outside hitter
10	(Poland) Jakub Nowosielski	11 February 1993	1.93 m (6 ft 4 in)	setter
11	(Poland) Adrian Buchowski	30 September 1991	1.94 m (6 ft 4 in)	outside hitter
12	(Slovakia) Emanuel Kohút	21 July 1982	2.04 m (6 ft 8 in)	middle blocker
13	(Poland) Jan Firlej	26 September 1996	1.88 m (6 ft 2 in)	setter
14	(Poland) Kamil Drzazga	11 September 2000	2.10 m (6 ft 11 in)	middle blocker
15	(Poland) Kamil Kwasowski	13 September 1990	1.97 m (6 ft 6 in)	outside hitter
21	(United States) Dustin Watten	27 October 1986	1.83 m (6 ft 0 in)	libero
23	(Poland) Dawid Ogórek	30 July 1990	1.84 m (6 ft 0 in)	libero
Head coach:		(Poland) Grzegorz Słaby		

Indykpol AZS Olsztyn
No.	Name	Date of birth	Height	Position
2	(Poland) Dawid Woch	16 May 1997	2.00 m (6 ft 7 in)	middle blocker
3	(Poland) Jędrzej Gruszczyński	13 November 1997	1.86 m (6 ft 1 in)	libero
4	(Poland) Przemysław Stępień	7 February 1994	1.85 m (6 ft 1 in)	setter
5	(Cuba) Javier Concepción	27 December 1997	2.00 m (6 ft 7 in)	middle blocker
6	(Netherlands) Robbert Andringa	28 April 1990	1.91 m (6 ft 3 in)	outside hitter
7	(Poland) Damian Schulz	26 February 1990	2.08 m (6 ft 10 in)	opposite
9	(Poland) Jakub Czerwiński	22 July 2001	1.95 m (6 ft 5 in)	outside hitter
10	(Poland) Remigiusz Kapica	28 September 2000	1.99 m (6 ft 6 in)	opposite
11	(Poland) Kamil Droszyński	28 January 1997	1.90 m (6 ft 3 in)	setter
12	(Ukraine) Dmytro Teryomenko	1 February 1987	2.00 m (6 ft 7 in)	middle blocker
13	(Germany) Ruben Schott	8 July 1994	1.92 m (6 ft 4 in)	outside hitter
15	(Poland) Jakub Ciunajtis	6 August 1998	1.77 m (5 ft 10 in)	libero
16	(Poland) Mateusz Poręba	24 August 1999	2.04 m (6 ft 8 in)	middle blocker
17	(Poland) Nikodem Wolański	19 January 1994	1.98 m (6 ft 6 in)	setter
21	(Poland) Wojciech Żaliński	8 January 1988	1.96 m (6 ft 5 in)	outside hitter
Head coach:		(Argentina) Daniel Castellani		

Jastrzębski Węgiel
No.	Name	Date of birth	Height	Position
3	(Poland) Jakub Popiwczak	17 April 1996	1.80 m (5 ft 11 in)	libero
4	(France) Yacine Louati	4 March 1992	1.98 m (6 ft 6 in)	outside hitter
5	(Poland) Jakub Bucki	13 August 1988	1.97 m (6 ft 6 in)	opposite
8	(Poland) Michał Gierżot	4 October 2001	2.03 m (6 ft 8 in)	outside hitter
9	(Poland) Łukasz Wiśniewski	3 February 1989	1.98 m (6 ft 6 in)	middle blocker
10	(Germany) Lukas Kampa	29 November 1986	1.93 m (6 ft 4 in)	setter
11	(Morocco) Mohamed Al Hachdadi	2 February 1991	2.00 m (6 ft 7 in)	opposite
12	(Poland) Stanisław Wawrzyńczyk	4 January 1990	2.00 m (6 ft 7 in)	outside hitter
13	(Poland) Yuriy Gladyr	8 July 1984	2.02 m (6 ft 8 in)	middle blocker
14	(Finland) Eemi Tervaportti	26 July 1989	1.93 m (6 ft 4 in)	setter
15	(Poland) Michał Szalacha	15 January 1994	2.02 m (6 ft 8 in)	middle blocker
20	(Poland) Patryk Cichosz-Dzyga	5 January 2001	2.10 m (6 ft 11 in)	middle blocker
21	(Poland) Tomasz Fornal	31 August 1997	2.00 m (6 ft 7 in)	outside hitter
24	(Poland) Szymon Biniek	30 July 1995	1.88 m (6 ft 2 in)	libero
26	(Poland) Rafał Szymura	29 August 1995	1.97 m (6 ft 6 in)	outside hitter
44	(Poland) Grzegorz Kosok	2 March 1986	2.05 m (6 ft 9 in)	middle blocker
Head coach:		(Australia) Luke Reynolds → (Italy) Andrea Gardini		

MKS Będzin
No.	Name	Date of birth	Height	Position
2	(Poland) Rafał Sobański	10 August 1991	1.95 m (6 ft 5 in)	outside hitter
3	(Poland) Łukasz Makowski	21 February 1989	1.87 m (6 ft 2 in)	setter
4	(Poland) Wiktor Haduch	2 January 2001	1.78 m (5 ft 10 in)	libero
5	(Poland) Artur Ratajczak	18 September 1990	2.06 m (6 ft 9 in)	middle blocker
8	(Poland) Tomasz Kalembka	30 June 1991	2.05 m (6 ft 9 in)	middle blocker
10	(Poland) Bartosz Gawryszewski	22 August 1985	2.02 m (6 ft 8 in)	middle blocker
11	(Brazil) Thiago Veloso	15 August 1993	1.85 m (6 ft 1 in)	setter
13	(Poland) Kacper Bobrowski	8 October 1997	1.90 m (6 ft 3 in)	outside hitter
14	(Poland) Bartosz Schmidt	3 June 1991	2.00 m (6 ft 7 in)	middle blocker
16	(Poland) Rafał Faryna	28 September 1994	2.00 m (6 ft 7 in)	opposite
17	(Poland) Szymon Gregorowicz	7 March 1994	1.83 m (6 ft 0 in)	libero
19	(Brazil) José Ademar Santana	6 February 1996	1.98 m (6 ft 6 in)	outside hitter
21	(Poland) Michał Godlewski	12 May 1998	2.01 m (6 ft 7 in)	opposite
Head coach:		(Poland) Jakub Bednaruk		

PGE Skra Bełchatów
No.	Name	Date of birth	Height	Position
1	(Poland) Bartosz Filipiak	27 February 1994	1.97 m (6 ft 6 in)	opposite
3	(United States) Taylor Sander	17 March 1992	1.96 m (6 ft 5 in)	outside hitter
6	(Poland) Karol Kłos	8 August 1989	2.01 m (6 ft 7 in)	middle blocker
7	(Poland) Sebastian Adamczyk	28 February 1999	2.08 m (6 ft 10 in)	middle blocker
8	(Serbia) Milan Katić	22 October 1993	2.01 m (6 ft 7 in)	outside hitter
11	(Iran) Milad Ebadipour	17 October 1993	1.96 m (6 ft 5 in)	outside hitter
12	(Serbia) Dušan Petković	27 January 1992	2.02 m (6 ft 8 in)	opposite
15	(Poland) Grzegorz Łomacz	1 October 1987	1.88 m (6 ft 2 in)	setter
16	(Poland) Kacper Piechocki	17 December 1995	1.85 m (6 ft 1 in)	libero
18	(Poland) Robert Milczarek	28 November 1983	1.88 m (6 ft 2 in)	libero
20	(Poland) Mateusz Bieniek	5 April 1994	2.08 m (6 ft 10 in)	middle blocker
26	(Serbia) Mihajlo Mitić	17 September 1990	2.01 m (6 ft 7 in)	setter
55	(Poland) Mikołaj Sawicki	23 November 1999	1.98 m (6 ft 6 in)	outside hitter
99	(Poland) Norbert Huber	14 August 1998	2.07 m (6 ft 9 in)	middle blocker
Head coach:		(Poland) Michał Mieszko Gogol		

Projekt Warsaw
No.	Name	Date of birth	Height	Position
1	(Poland) Jakub Kowalczyk	26 June 1986	2.00 m (6 ft 7 in)	middle blocker
2	(Poland) Bartosz Kwolek	17 July 1997	1.93 m (6 ft 4 in)	outside hitter
4	(Poland) Jan Król	23 August 1989	1.98 m (6 ft 6 in)	opposite
7	(Spain) Ángel Trinidad	27 March 1993	1.95 m (6 ft 5 in)	setter
8	(Poland) Andrzej Wrona	27 December 1988	2.06 m (6 ft 9 in)	middle blocker
9	(Poland) Jakub Ziobrowski	23 January 1997	2.02 m (6 ft 8 in)	opposite
11	(Poland) Piotr Nowakowski	18 December 1987	2.05 m (6 ft 9 in)	middle blocker
13	(Belgium) Igor Grobelny	8 June 1993	1.94 m (6 ft 4 in)	outside hitter
14	(Poland) Michał Superlak	16 November 1993	2.06 m (6 ft 9 in)	opposite
18	(Poland) Damian Wojtaszek	7 September 1988	1.80 m (5 ft 11 in)	libero
20	(Poland) Michał Kozłowski	14 April 2001	2.03 m (6 ft 8 in)	middle blocker
21	(Poland) Artur Szalpuk	20 March 1995	2.01 m (6 ft 7 in)	outside hitter
23	(Poland) Jan Fornal	14 January 1995	1.91 m (6 ft 3 in)	outside hitter
85	(Poland) Michał Kozłowski	16 February 1985	1.91 m (6 ft 3 in)	setter
Head coach:		(Italy) Andrea Anastasi		

Stal Nysa
No.	Name	Date of birth	Height	Position
1	(Poland) Maciej Zajder	31 January 1988	2.02 m (6 ft 8 in)	middle blocker
4	(Poland) Kamil Długosz	20 March 1992	2.00 m (6 ft 7 in)	outside hitter
5	(Poland) Marcin Komenda	24 May 1996	1.98 m (6 ft 6 in)	setter
8	(Poland) Bartosz Bućko	6 January 1995	1.95 m (6 ft 5 in)	outside hitter
9	(Poland) Zbigniew Bartman	4 May 1987	1.98 m (6 ft 6 in)	outside hitter
10	(Tunisia) Wassim Ben Tara	3 August 1996	2.03 m (6 ft 8 in)	opposite
11	(Poland) Moustapha M'Baye	18 September 1992	1.98 m (6 ft 6 in)	middle blocker
16	(Poland) Kamil Dembiec	7 February 1992	1.78 m (5 ft 10 in)	libero
17	(Poland) Michał Ruciak	22 August 1983	1.90 m (6 ft 3 in)	libero
44	(Poland) Mariusz Schamlewski	16 January 1991	1.98 m (6 ft 6 in)	middle blocker
77	(Poland) Bartłomiej Lemański	19 March 1996	2.16 m (7 ft 1 in)	middle blocker
91	(Poland) Patryk Szczurek	6 February 1991	1.93 m (6 ft 4 in)	setter
93	(Poland) Łukasz Łapszyński	23 September 1993	1.94 m (6 ft 4 in)	outside hitter
94	(Poland) Michał Filip	31 August 1994	1.97 m (6 ft 6 in)	opposite
Head coach:		(Poland) Krzysztof Stelmach		

Ślepsk Malow Suwałki
No.	Name	Date of birth	Height	Position
1	(Poland) Marcin Waliński	24 October 1990	1.95 m (6 ft 5 in)	outside hitter
2	(Poland) Patryk Szwaradzki	27 June 1995	1.95 m (6 ft 5 in)	opposite
3	(Poland) Łukasz Kaczorowski	12 May 1988	1.96 m (6 ft 5 in)	opposite
7	(Belgium) Tomas Rousseaux	31 March 1994	1.99 m (6 ft 6 in)	outside hitter
8	(Belgium) Kevin Klinkenberg	4 October 1990	1.97 m (6 ft 6 in)	outside hitter
9	(Poland) Sebastian Warda	18 January 1989	2.04 m (6 ft 8 in)	middle blocker
10	(Poland) Bartłomiej Bołądź	28 September 1994	2.04 m (6 ft 8 in)	opposite
11	(Norway) Andreas Takvam	4 June 1993	2.01 m (6 ft 7 in)	middle blocker
12	(Poland) Łukasz Rudzewicz	25 January 1985	1.98 m (6 ft 6 in)	middle blocker
14	(Poland) Cezary Sapiński	28 September 1994	2.03 m (6 ft 8 in)	middle blocker
16	(Poland) Paweł Filipowicz	7 May 1992	1.89 m (6 ft 2 in)	libero
17	(Poland) Mateusz Sacharewicz	23 October 1989	1.98 m (6 ft 6 in)	middle blocker
18	(Poland) Kacper Gonciarz	31 August 1992	1.92 m (6 ft 4 in)	setter
24	(Poland) Mateusz Czunkiewicz	16 December 1996	1.83 m (6 ft 0 in)	libero
25	(Poland) Jakub Rohnka	10 March 1992	1.95 m (6 ft 5 in)	outside hitter
91	(United States) Joshua Tuaniga	18 March 1997	1.95 m (6 ft 5 in)	setter
Head coach:		(Poland) Andrzej Kowal		

Trefl Gdańsk
No.	Name	Date of birth	Height	Position
1	(Poland) Bartłomiej Lipiński	16 November 1996	2.01 m (6 ft 7 in)	outside hitter
2	(Poland) Mariusz Wlazły	4 August 1983	1.94 m (6 ft 4 in)	opposite
4	(Poland) Łukasz Kozub	3 November 1997	1.86 m (6 ft 1 in)	setter
5	(Poland) Marcin Janusz	31 July 1994	1.95 m (6 ft 5 in)	setter
7	(Poland) Bartosz Pietruczuk	26 February 1993	1.97 m (6 ft 6 in)	outside hitter
9	(Poland) Kewin Sasak	20 February 1997	2.08 m (6 ft 10 in)	opposite
10	(Germany) Moritz Reichert	15 March 1995	1.95 m (6 ft 5 in)	outside hitter
11	(Poland) Mateusz Janikowski	5 May 1999	2.01 m (6 ft 7 in)	outside hitter
12	(Poland) Karol Urbanowicz	24 February 2001	2.00 m (6 ft 7 in)	middle blocker
14	(Poland) Maciej Olenderek	16 October 1992	1.78 m (5 ft 10 in)	libero
15	(Poland) Mateusz Mika	21 January 1991	2.06 m (6 ft 9 in)	outside hitter
16	(Poland) Fabian Majcherski	28 March 1997	1.75 m (5 ft 9 in)	libero
17	(Poland) Bartłomiej Mordyl	21 January 1995	2.01 m (6 ft 7 in)	middle blocker
18	(Argentina) Pablo Crer	12 June 1989	2.05 m (6 ft 9 in)	middle blocker
19	(Poland) Seweryn Lipiński	1 January 2001	2.00 m (6 ft 7 in)	middle blocker
Head coach:		(Poland) Michał Winiarski		

ZAKSA Kędzierzyn-Koźle
No.	Name	Date of birth	Height	Position
1	(Poland) Paweł Zatorski	21 June 1990	1.84 m (6 ft 0 in)	libero
2	(Poland) Łukasz Kaczmarek	29 June 1994	2.04 m (6 ft 8 in)	opposite
3	(Poland) Jakub Kochanowski	17 July 1997	1.99 m (6 ft 6 in)	middle blocker
4	(Poland) Krzysztof Rejno	22 February 1993	2.03 m (6 ft 8 in)	middle blocker
6	(France) Benjamin Toniutti	30 October 1989	1.83 m (6 ft 0 in)	setter
7	(Poland) Piotr Łukasik	11 July 1994	2.08 m (6 ft 10 in)	outside hitter
8	(Poland) Adrian Staszewski	31 May 1990	1.96 m (6 ft 5 in)	outside hitter
9	(Poland) Bartłomiej Kluth	20 December 1992	2.10 m (6 ft 11 in)	opposite
11	(Poland) Aleksander Śliwka	24 May 1995	1.98 m (6 ft 6 in)	outside hitter
13	(Poland) Kamil Semeniuk	16 July 1996	1.94 m (6 ft 4 in)	outside hitter
15	(United States) David Smith	15 May 1985	2.01 m (6 ft 7 in)	middle blocker
16	(Poland) Dominik Depowski	27 October 1995	2.00 m (6 ft 7 in)	outside hitter
17	(Poland) Rafał Prokopczuk	23 March 1999	1.87 m (6 ft 2 in)	setter
66	(Poland) Mateusz Zawalski	7 February 1995	1.97 m (6 ft 6 in)	middle blocker
71	(Poland) Korneliusz Banach	25 January 1994	1.84 m (6 ft 0 in)	libero
Head coach:		(Serbia) Nikola Grbić		

== See also ==
- 2020–21 CEV Champions League
