= 2022–23 CEV Champions League =

- League: CEV Champions League
- Sport: Volleyball
- Duration: Qualifying round: 20 September – 27 October 2022; Main tournament: 8 November 2022 – 20 May 2023
- Number of matches: 78
- Number of teams: 29 (11 qual. + 18 main tourn.)
- Total attendance: 187,705
- Average attendance: 2,406

Finals
- Venue: (Italy) Turin
- Champions: (Poland) ZAKSA Kędzierzyn-Koźle
- Finals MVP: (United States) David Smith

CEV Champions League seasons
- ← 2021–22 2023–24 →

The 2022–23 CEV Champions League was the 64th edition of the highest level European volleyball club competition organised by the European Volleyball Confederation.

== Qualification ==
Rank	Country	Number of teams			Qualified teams
Rank	Country	Vac	Qual	Total	Qualified teams
1	Italy	3	–	3	Cucine Lube Civitanova
1	Italy	3	–	3	Sir Sicoma Monini Perugia
1	Italy	3	–	3	Itas Trentino
3	Poland	3	–	3	ZAKSA Kędzierzyn-Koźle
3	Poland	3	–	3	Jastrzębski Węgiel
3	Poland	3	–	3	Aluron CMC Warta Zawiercie
4	Germany	3	–	3	Berlin Recycling Volleys
4	Germany	3	–	3	VfB Friedrichshafen
4	Germany	3	–	3	SWD Powervolleys Düren
5	Belgium	2	–	2	Knack Roeselare
5	Belgium	2	–	2	Decospan VT Menen
6	Turkey	2	–	2	Ziraat Bank Ankara
6	Turkey	2	–	2	Halkbank Ankara
7	France	2	–	2	Montpellier HSC VB
7	France	2	–	2	Tours VB
8	Slovenia	1	–	1	ACH Volley Ljubljana
9	Czech Republic	1	–	1	ČEZ Karlovarsko
10	Serbia	1	–	1	Vojvodina NS Seme Novi Sad
13	Portugal	–	1	1	Sport Lisboa e Benfica
16	Bulgaria	–	1	1	Hebar Pazardzhik

== Pools composition ==
Drawing of Lots was held on 16 September 2022 in Brussels.

Pool A	Pool B	Pool C
Jastrzębski Węgiel	Berlin Recycling Volleys	Cucine Lube Civitanova
VfB Friedrichshafen	Aluron CMC Warta Zawiercie	Knack Roeselare
Montpellier HSC VB	Halkbank Ankara	Tours VB
Vojvodina NS Seme Novi Sad	Hebar Pazardzhik	Sport Lisboa e Benfica

Pool D	Pool E
ZAKSA Kędzierzyn-Koźle	Sir Sicoma Monini Perugia
Itas Trentino	SWD Powervolleys Düren
Decospan VT Menen	Ziraat Bank Ankara
ČEZ Karlovarsko	ACH Volley Ljubljana

== League round ==
- The teams are split into 5 groups, each one featuring four teams.
- The top team in each pool automatically qualifies for the quarterfinals.
- All 2nd placed teams and the best 3rd placed team qualify for the playoffs.
- The remaining 3rd placed teams will compete in the quarterfinals of the 2022–23 CEV Cup.
- All times are local.

=== Pool standing procedure ===
1. Number of victories
2. Points
3. Set ratio
4. Setpoint ratio
5. H2H results

Result	Winners	Losers
3–0	3 points	0 points
3–1	3 points	0 points
3–2	2 points	1 point

=== Pool A ===
Pos	Team	Pld	W	L	Pts	SW	SL	SR	SPW	SPL	SPR	Qualification
1	(Poland) Jastrzębski Węgiel	6	6	0	18	18	2	9.000	505	433	1.166	Quarterfinals
2	(Germany) VfB Friedrichshafen	6	4	2	10	13	11	1.182	552	533	1.036	Playoffs
3	(France) Montpellier HSC VB	6	1	5	5	9	15	0.600	541	548	0.987	2022–23 CEV Cup
4	(Serbia) Vojvodina NS Seme Novi Sad	6	1	5	3	4	16	0.250	404	488	0.828	

Source: CEV

Date	Time		Score		Set 1	Set 2	Set 3	Set 4	Set 5	Total	Report
8 Nov	18:00	Jastrzębski Węgiel (Poland)	3–0	(Serbia) Vojvodina NS Seme Novi Sad	25–23	25–19	25–20			75–62	Report
10 Nov	20:00	VfB Friedrichshafen (Germany)	3–2	(France) Montpellier HSC VB	20–25	20–25	25–22	25–23	15–11	105–106	Report
16 Nov	18:00	Montpellier HSC VB (France)	1–3	(Poland) Jastrzębski Węgiel	25–23	19–25	23–25	20–25		87–98	Report
16 Nov	20:00	Vojvodina NS Seme Novi Sad (Serbia)	0–3	(Germany) VfB Friedrichshafen	20–25	17–25	17–25			54–75	Report
29 Nov	18:00	VfB Friedrichshafen (Germany)	1–3	(Poland) Jastrzębski Węgiel	25–18	31–33	14–25	22–25		92–101	Report
30 Nov	18:00	Vojvodina NS Seme Novi Sad (Serbia)	3–1	(France) Montpellier HSC VB	19–25	30–28	25–17	25–23		99–93	Report
13 Dec	18:00	Jastrzębski Węgiel (Poland)	3–0	(France) Montpellier HSC VB	25–23	27–25	25–20			77–68	Report
13 Dec	20:00	VfB Friedrichshafen (Germany)	3–1	(Serbia) Vojvodina NS Seme Novi Sad	20–25	25–17	25–16	25–23		95–81	Report
10 Jan	19:00	Montpellier HSC VB (France)	2–3	(Germany) VfB Friedrichshafen	26–28	25–22	23–25	25–23	13–15	112–113	Report
11 Jan	18:00	Vojvodina NS Seme Novi Sad (Serbia)	0–3	(Poland) Jastrzębski Węgiel	22–25	16–25	14–25			52–75	Report
25 Jan	18:00	Jastrzębski Węgiel (Poland)	3–0	(Germany) VfB Friedrichshafen	25–22	26–24	28–26			79–72	Report
25 Jan	19:00	Montpellier HSC VB (France)	3–0	(Serbia) Vojvodina NS Seme Novi Sad	25–19	25–21	25–16			75–56	Report

=== Pool B ===
Pos	Team	Pld	W	L	Pts	SW	SL	SR	SPW	SPL	SPR	Qualification
1	(Turkey) Halkbank Ankara	6	5	1	13	16	8	2.000	563	533	1.056	Quarterfinals
2	(Germany) Berlin Recycling Volleys	6	4	2	11	13	9	1.444	524	499	1.050	Playoffs
3	(Poland) Aluron CMC Warta Zawiercie	6	3	3	10	12	11	1.091	543	521	1.042	Playoffs
4	(Bulgaria) Hebar Pazardzhik	6	0	6	2	5	18	0.278	470	547	0.859	

Source: CEV

Date	Time		Score		Set 1	Set 2	Set 3	Set 4	Set 5	Total	Report
8 Nov	19:30	Berlin Recycling Volleys (Germany)	3–2	(Bulgaria) Hebar Pazardzhik	23–25	23–25	25–17	28–26	15–12	114–105	Report
10 Nov	18:00	Aluron CMC Warta Zawiercie (Poland)	3–1	(Turkey) Halkbank Ankara	23–25	26–24	25–21	25–15		99–85	Report
16 Nov	17:30	Halkbank Ankara (Turkey)	3–1	(Germany) Berlin Recycling Volleys	25–21	25–19	22–25	25–23		97–88	Report
16 Nov	19:00	Hebar Pazardzhik (Bulgaria)	1–3	(Poland) Aluron CMC Warta Zawiercie	22–25	25–21	18–25	26–28		91–99	Report
30 Nov	18:00	Aluron CMC Warta Zawiercie (Poland)	1–3	(Germany) Berlin Recycling Volleys	21–25	25–20	27–29	25–27		98–101	Report
30 Nov	19:00	Hebar Pazardzhik (Bulgaria)	2–3	(Turkey) Halkbank Ankara	19–25	20–25	25–19	25–22	7–15	96–106	Report
13 Dec	19:30	Berlin Recycling Volleys (Germany)	0–3	(Turkey) Halkbank Ankara	16–25	33–35	22–25			71–85	Report
14 Dec	18:00	Aluron CMC Warta Zawiercie (Poland)	3–0	(Bulgaria) Hebar Pazardzhik	26–24	25–15	25–17			76–56	Report
11 Jan	20:30	Halkbank Ankara (Turkey)	3–2	(Poland) Aluron CMC Warta Zawiercie	21–25	25–23	23–25	25–23	19–17	113–113	Report
12 Jan	19:00	Hebar Pazardzhik (Bulgaria)	0–3	(Germany) Berlin Recycling Volleys	20–25	16–25	20–25			56–75	Report
25 Jan	17:30	Halkbank Ankara (Turkey)	3–0	(Bulgaria) Hebar Pazardzhik	25–22	27–25	25–19			77–66	Report
25 Jan	19:30	Berlin Recycling Volleys (Germany)	3–0	(Poland) Aluron CMC Warta Zawiercie	25–22	25–17	25–19			75–58	Report

=== Pool C ===
Pos	Team	Pld	W	L	Pts	SW	SL	SR	SPW	SPL	SPR	Qualification
1	(Italy) Cucine Lube Civitanova	6	6	0	16	18	6	3.000	568	488	1.164	Quarterfinals
2	(France) Tours VB	6	3	3	10	12	10	1.200	499	492	1.014	Playoffs
3	(Belgium) Knack Roeselare	6	3	3	8	12	13	0.923	560	562	0.996	2022–23 CEV Cup
4	(Portugal) Sport Lisboa e Benfica	6	0	6	2	5	18	0.278	465	550	0.845	

Source: CEV

Date	Time		Score		Set 1	Set 2	Set 3	Set 4	Set 5	Total	Report
9 Nov	19:00	Cucine Lube Civitanova (Italy)	3–2	(Portugal) Sport Lisboa e Benfica	23–25	21–25	25–19	25–22	15–13	109–104	Report
10 Nov	20:30	Knack Roeselare (Belgium)	0–3	(France) Tours VB	22–25	19–25	20–25			61–75	Report
16 Nov	18:15	Sport Lisboa e Benfica (Portugal)	2–3	(Belgium) Knack Roeselare	25–23	24–26	23–25	25–22	9–15	106–111	Report
16 Nov	20:00	Tours VB (France)	1–3	(Italy) Cucine Lube Civitanova	25–20	20–25	22–25	13–25		80–95	Report
29 Nov	20:00	Sport Lisboa e Benfica (Portugal)	1–3	(France) Tours VB	30–28	21–25	19–25	21–25		91–103	Report
30 Nov	20:30	Knack Roeselare (Belgium)	1–3	(Italy) Cucine Lube Civitanova	19–25	25–21	23–25	27–29		94–100	Report
13 Dec	20:30	Knack Roeselare (Belgium)	3–0	(Portugal) Sport Lisboa e Benfica	25–18	25–22	25–16			75–56	Report
14 Dec	19:00	Cucine Lube Civitanova (Italy)	3–0	(France) Tours VB	25–23	25–13	25–17			75–53	Report
10 Jan	20:00	Sport Lisboa e Benfica (Portugal)	0–3	(Italy) Cucine Lube Civitanova	18–25	19–25	18–25			55–75	Report
11 Jan	20:00	Tours VB (France)	2–3	(Belgium) Knack Roeselare	23–25	26–24	23–25	30–28	9–15	111–117	Report
25 Jan	20:00	Cucine Lube Civitanova (Italy)	3–2	(Belgium) Knack Roeselare	25–23	26–28	23–25	25–17	15–9	114–102	Report
25 Jan	20:00	Tours VB (France)	3–0	(Portugal) Sport Lisboa e Benfica	27–25	25–10	25–18			77–53	Report

=== Pool D ===
Pos	Team	Pld	W	L	Pts	SW	SL	SR	SPW	SPL	SPR	Qualification
1	(Italy) Itas Trentino	6	6	0	17	18	4	4.500	511	416	1.228	Quarterfinals
2	(Poland) ZAKSA Kędzierzyn-Koźle	6	4	2	12	15	9	1.667	556	499	1.114	Playoffs
3	(Czech Republic) ČEZ Karlovarsko	6	2	4	7	10	12	0.833	476	510	0.933	2022–23 CEV Cup
4	(Belgium) Decospan VT Menen	6	0	6	0	0	18	0.000	337	455	0.741	

Source: CEV

Date	Time		Score		Set 1	Set 2	Set 3	Set 4	Set 5	Total	Report
9 Nov	20:30	ZAKSA Kędzierzyn-Koźle (Poland)	3–1	(Czech Republic) ČEZ Karlovarsko	25–22	25–21	24–26	26–24		100–93	Report
10 Nov	20:30	Itas Trentino (Italy)	3–0	(Belgium) Decospan VT Menen	25–16	25–17	25–12			75–45	Report
16 Nov	18:00	ČEZ Karlovarsko (Czech Republic)	1–3	(Italy) Itas Trentino	19–25	20–25	25–21	13–25		77–96	Report
16 Nov	20:30	Decospan VT Menen (Belgium)	0–3	(Poland) ZAKSA Kędzierzyn-Koźle	17–25	22–25	21–25			60–75	Report
29 Nov	20:30	Itas Trentino (Italy)	3–1	(Poland) ZAKSA Kędzierzyn-Koźle	25–20	17–25	26–24	25–23		93–92	Report
30 Nov	18:00	ČEZ Karlovarsko (Czech Republic)	3–0	(Belgium) Decospan VT Menen	28–26	26–24	25–17			79–67	Report
14 Dec	20:30	ZAKSA Kędzierzyn-Koźle (Poland)	3–0	(Belgium) Decospan VT Menen	25–16	25–17	25–21			75–54	Report
15 Dec	20:30	Itas Trentino (Italy)	3–0	(Czech Republic) ČEZ Karlovarsko	25–17	25–15	25–17			75–49	Report
11 Jan	17:00	ČEZ Karlovarsko (Czech Republic)	2–3	(Poland) ZAKSA Kędzierzyn-Koźle	25–23	21–25	18–25	25–23	13–15	102–111	Report
11 Jan	20:30	Decospan VT Menen (Belgium)	0–3	(Italy) Itas Trentino	15–25	19–25	16–25			50–75	Report
25 Jan	20:30	ZAKSA Kędzierzyn-Koźle (Poland)	2–3	(Italy) Itas Trentino	25–17	25–15	18–25	23–25	12–15	103–97	Report
25 Jan	20:30	Decospan VT Menen (Belgium)	0–3	(Czech Republic) ČEZ Karlovarsko	24–26	20–25	17–25			61–76	Report

=== Pool E ===
Pos	Team	Pld	W	L	Pts	SW	SL	SR	SPW	SPL	SPR	Qualification
1	(Italy) Sir Sicoma Monini Perugia	6	6	0	18	18	4	4.500	545	451	1.208	Quarterfinals
2	(Turkey) Ziraat Bank Ankara	6	3	3	7	12	13	0.923	544	552	0.986	Playoffs
3	(Slovenia) ACH Volley Ljubljana	6	2	4	8	11	14	0.786	524	553	0.948	2022–23 CEV Cup
4	(Germany) SWD Powervolleys Düren	6	1	5	3	6	16	0.375	471	528	0.892	

Source: CEV

Date	Time		Score		Set 1	Set 2	Set 3	Set 4	Set 5	Total	Report
9 Nov	20:00	Sir Sicoma Monini Perugia (Italy)	3–0	(Slovenia) ACH Volley Ljubljana	25–19	25–16	25–19			75–54	Report
9 Nov	20:00	SWD Powervolleys Düren (Germany)	3–1	(Turkey) Ziraat Bank Ankara	25–23	25–18	21–25	25–16		96–82	Report
16 Nov	18:00	ACH Volley Ljubljana (Slovenia)	3–1	(Germany) SWD Powervolleys Düren	25–20	25–22	21–25	25–13		96–80	Report
16 Nov	20:00	Ziraat Bank Ankara (Turkey)	1–3	(Italy) Sir Sicoma Monini Perugia	26–24	22–25	20–25	23–25		91–99	Report
29 Nov	19:00	SWD Powervolleys Düren (Germany)	0–3	(Italy) Sir Sicoma Monini Perugia	17–25	23–25	21–25			61–75	Report
30 Nov	18:00	ACH Volley Ljubljana (Slovenia)	2–3	(Turkey) Ziraat Bank Ankara	17–25	25–20	25–23	23–25	12–15	102–108	Report
14 Dec	20:00	SWD Powervolleys Düren (Germany)	1–3	(Slovenia) ACH Volley Ljubljana	21–25	20–25	25–19	16–25		82–94	Report
15 Dec	20:00	Sir Sicoma Monini Perugia (Italy)	3–1	(Turkey) Ziraat Bank Ankara	25–17	19–25	25–17	25–17		94–76	Report
11 Jan	17:30	Ziraat Bank Ankara (Turkey)	3–0	(Germany) SWD Powervolleys Düren	27–25	25–21	25–13			77–59	Report
11 Jan	18:00	ACH Volley Ljubljana (Slovenia)	1–3	(Italy) Sir Sicoma Monini Perugia	21–25	15–25	25–23	15–25		76–98	Report
25 Jan	20:00	Ziraat Bank Ankara (Turkey)	3–2	(Slovenia) ACH Volley Ljubljana	23–25	25–23	22–25	25–21	15–8	110–102	Report
25 Jan	20:30	Sir Sicoma Monini Perugia (Italy)	3–1	(Germany) SWD Powervolleys Düren	28–30	26–24	25–20	25–19		104–93	Report

=== First place ranking ===
Pos	Pool	Team	Pld	W	L	Pts	SW	SL	SR	SPW	SPL	SPR	Qualification
1	A	(Poland) Jastrzębski Węgiel	6	6	0	18	18	2	9.000	505	433	1.166	Quarterfinals
2	E	(Italy) Sir Sicoma Monini Perugia	6	6	0	18	18	4	4.500	545	451	1.208	Quarterfinals
3	D	(Italy) Itas Trentino	6	6	0	17	18	4	4.500	511	416	1.228	Quarterfinals
4	C	(Italy) Cucine Lube Civitanova	6	6	0	16	18	6	3.000	568	488	1.164	Quarterfinals
5	B	(Turkey) Halkbank Ankara	6	5	1	13	16	8	2.000	563	533	1.056	Quarterfinals

Source: CEV

=== Second place ranking ===
Pos	Pool	Team	Pld	W	L	Pts	SW	SL	SR	SPW	SPL	SPR	Qualification
1	D	(Poland) ZAKSA Kędzierzyn-Koźle	6	4	2	12	15	9	1.667	556	499	1.114	Playoffs
2	B	(Germany) Berlin Recycling Volleys	6	4	2	11	13	9	1.444	524	499	1.050	Playoffs
3	A	(Germany) VfB Friedrichshafen	6	4	2	10	13	11	1.182	552	533	1.036	Playoffs
4	C	(France) Tours VB	6	3	3	10	12	10	1.200	499	492	1.014	Playoffs
5	E	(Turkey) Ziraat Bank Ankara	6	3	3	7	12	13	0.923	544	552	0.986	Playoffs

Source: CEV

=== Third place ranking ===
Pos	Pool	Team	Pld	W	L	Pts	SW	SL	SR	SPW	SPL	SPR	Qualification
1	B	(Poland) Aluron CMC Warta Zawiercie	6	3	3	10	12	11	1.091	543	521	1.042	Playoffs
2	C	(Belgium) Knack Roeselare	6	3	3	8	12	13	0.923	560	562	0.996	2022–23 CEV Cup
3	E	(Slovenia) ACH Volley Ljubljana	6	2	4	8	11	14	0.786	524	553	0.948	2022–23 CEV Cup
4	D	(Czech Republic) ČEZ Karlovarsko	6	2	4	7	10	12	0.833	476	510	0.933	2022–23 CEV Cup
5	A	(France) Montpellier HSC VB	6	1	5	5	9	15	0.600	541	548	0.987	2022–23 CEV Cup

Source: CEV

== Bracket ==
Playoff 6
(Poland) Warta Zawiercie	0	3
(Poland) ZAKSA	3	2
(Turkey) Ziraat Bank Ankara	2
(Germany) BR Volleys	3
(France) Tours VB	0	2
(Germany) Friedrichshafen	3	3

Quarterfinals
(Poland) ZAKSA	3	2	15
(Italy) Itas Trentino	2	3	9
(Germany) BR Volleys	1	2
(Italy) Perugia	3	3
(Turkey) Halkbank Ankara	3	1	15
(Italy) Lube	1	3	12
(Germany) Friedrichshafen	0	0
(Poland) Jastrzębski Węgiel	3	3

Semifinals
(Poland) ZAKSA	3	3
(Italy) Perugia	1	1
(Turkey) Halkbank Ankara	1	3
(Poland) Jastrzębski Węgiel	3	2

Final
(Poland) ZAKSA	3
(Poland) Jastrzębski Węgiel	2

== Playoff 6 ==
- The winners of the ties qualify for the quarterfinals.
- Aggregate score is counted as follows: 3 points for 3–0 or 3–1 win, 2 points for 3–2 win, 1 point for 2–3 loss.
- In case the teams are tied after two legs, a Golden Set is played immediately at the completion of the second leg.
- All times are local.

Team 1	Agg.	Team 2	1st leg	2nd leg
Aluron CMC Warta Zawiercie (Poland)	2–4	(Poland) ZAKSA Kędzierzyn-Koźle	0–3	3–2
Ziraat Bank Ankara (Turkey)	1–2	(Germany) Berlin Recycling Volleys	Cancelled (Note: Due to the earthquakes, which occurred on the territory of Turkey and Syria, the first leg match between Ziraat Bank Ankara and Berlin Recycling Volleys has been cancelled. The second leg match held in Berlin determined the winner who moved on to the next stage of the competition.)	2–3
Tours VB (France)	1–5	(Germany) VfB Friedrichshafen	0–3	2–3

=== First leg ===
Date	Time		Score		Set 1	Set 2	Set 3	Set 4	Set 5	Total	Report
7 Feb	18:00	Aluron CMC Warta Zawiercie (Poland)	0–3	(Poland) ZAKSA Kędzierzyn-Koźle	23–25	19–25	23–25			65–75	Report
8 Feb	20:00	Tours VB (France)	0–3	(Germany) VfB Friedrichshafen	23–25	21–25	21–25			65–75	Report

=== Second leg ===
Date	Time		Score		Set 1	Set 2	Set 3	Set 4	Set 5	Total	Report
15 Feb	18:00	ZAKSA Kędzierzyn-Koźle (Poland)	2–3	(Poland) Aluron CMC Warta Zawiercie	28–26	21–25	25–23	19–25	11–15	104–114	Report
15 Feb	19:30	Berlin Recycling Volleys (Germany)	3–2	(Turkey) Ziraat Bank Ankara	24–26	25–21	25–20	18–25	15–9	107–101	Report
15 Feb	20:00	VfB Friedrichshafen (Germany)	3–2	(France) Tours VB	21–25	15–25	25–18	25–21	15–11	101–100	Report

== Quarterfinals ==
- The winners of the ties qualify for the semifinals.
- Aggregate score is counted as follows: 3 points for 3–0 or 3–1 win, 2 points for 3–2 win, 1 point for 2–3 loss.
- In case the teams are tied after two legs, a Golden Set is played immediately at the completion of the second leg.
- All times are local.

Team 1	Agg.	Team 2	1st leg	2nd leg	Golden Set
ZAKSA Kędzierzyn-Koźle (Poland)	3–3	(Italy) Itas Trentino	3–2	2–3	15–9
Berlin Recycling Volleys (Germany)	1–5	(Italy) Sir Sicoma Monini Perugia	1–3	2–3	
Halkbank Ankara (Turkey)	3–3	(Italy) Cucine Lube Civitanova	3–1	1–3	15–12
VfB Friedrichshafen (Germany)	0–6	(Poland) Jastrzębski Węgiel	0–3	0–3	

=== First leg ===
Date	Time		Score		Set 1	Set 2	Set 3	Set 4	Set 5	Total	Report
7 Mar	20:30	ZAKSA Kędzierzyn-Koźle (Poland)	3–2	(Italy) Itas Trentino	25–22	22–25	22–25	25–21	15–10	109–103	Report
8 Mar	19:30	Berlin Recycling Volleys (Germany)	1–3	(Italy) Sir Sicoma Monini Perugia	18–25	15–25	25–23	17–25		75–98	Report
7 Mar	19:00	Halkbank Ankara (Turkey)	3–1	(Italy) Cucine Lube Civitanova	21–25	25–20	25–23	25–21		96–89	Report
9 Mar	19:00	VfB Friedrichshafen (Germany)	0–3	(Poland) Jastrzębski Węgiel	17–25	16–25	13–25			46–75	Report

=== Second leg ===
Date	Time		Score		Set 1	Set 2	Set 3	Set 4	Set 5	Total	Report
16 Mar	20:30	Itas Trentino (Italy)	3–2	(Poland) ZAKSA Kędzierzyn-Koźle	25–19	23–25	27–29	25–21	15–12	115–106	Report
Golden set		Itas Trentino (Italy)	9–15	(Poland) ZAKSA Kędzierzyn-Koźle							
15 Mar	20:00	Sir Sicoma Monini Perugia (Italy)	3–2	(Germany) Berlin Recycling Volleys	24–26	25–21	22–25	25–17	15–13	111–102	Report
15 Mar	20:30	Cucine Lube Civitanova (Italy)	3–1	(Turkey) Halkbank Ankara	31–29	25–20	23–25	25–20		104–94	Report
Golden set		Cucine Lube Civitanova (Italy)	12–15	(Turkey) Halkbank Ankara							
15 Mar	18:00	Jastrzębski Węgiel (Poland)	3–0	(Germany) VfB Friedrichshafen	25–14	25–20	25–16			75–50	Report

== Semifinals ==
- The winners of the ties qualify for the final.
- Aggregate score is counted as follows: 3 points for 3–0 or 3–1 win, 2 points for 3–2 win, 1 point for 2–3 loss.
- In case the teams are tied after two legs, a Golden Set is played immediately at the completion of the second leg.
- All times are local.

Team 1	Agg.	Team 2	1st leg	2nd leg
ZAKSA Kędzierzyn-Koźle (Poland)	6–0	(Italy) Sir Sicoma Monini Perugia	3–1	3–1
Halkbank Ankara (Turkey)	2–4	(Poland) Jastrzębski Węgiel	1–3	3–2

=== First leg ===
Date	Time		Score		Set 1	Set 2	Set 3	Set 4	Set 5	Total	Report
29 Mar	20:30	ZAKSA Kędzierzyn-Koźle (Poland)	3–1	(Italy) Sir Sicoma Monini Perugia	25–18	24–26	25–19	25–22		99–85	Report
29 Mar	19:00	Halkbank Ankara (Turkey)	1–3	(Poland) Jastrzębski Węgiel	22–25	23–25	25–16	22–25		92–91	Report

=== Second leg ===
Date	Time		Score		Set 1	Set 2	Set 3	Set 4	Set 5	Total	Report
6 Apr	20:30	Sir Sicoma Monini Perugia (Italy)	1–3	(Poland) ZAKSA Kędzierzyn-Koźle	23–25	18–25	25–19	25–27		91–96	Report
5 Apr	20:30	Jastrzębski Węgiel (Poland)	2–3	(Turkey) Halkbank Ankara	25–17	18–25	22–25	25–16	12–15	102–98	Report

== Final ==
- Place: Turin
- Time: Central European Summer Time (UTC+02:00).

Date	Time		Score		Set 1	Set 2	Set 3	Set 4	Set 5	Total	Report
20 May	20:30	ZAKSA Kędzierzyn-Koźle (Poland)	3–2	(Poland) Jastrzębski Węgiel	26–28	25–22	25–14	28–30	15–12	119–106	Report

== Final standings ==
Qualified for the 2023 FIVB Club World Championship

Rank	Team
1st place, gold medalist(s)	(Poland) ZAKSA Kędzierzyn-Koźle
2nd place, silver medalist(s)	(Poland) Jastrzębski Węgiel
Semifinalists	(Turkey) Halkbank Ankara (Italy) Sir Sicoma Monini Perugia

2022–23 CEV Champions League winners
(Poland)
ZAKSA Kędzierzyn-Koźle
3rd title
