= ASV Dachau (volleyball) =

- Full name: Allgemeiner Sportverein Dachau
- Founded: 1908
- League: 1. Bundesliga
- Website: Club home page

Uniforms
Home	Away

ASV Dachau (Allgemeiner Sportverein Dachau) is a German men's volleyball club, based in the Bavarian town of Dachau. Currently it plays in the 1. Bundesliga, but in the past has won several national titles, and has appeared in European competitions.

== History ==
The team was founded as a volleyball department of the Allgemeiner Sportverein Dachau eV, a sports club founded in 1908 and that has more than 3,200 members. The team rose to national prominence in the nineties, when it served for several years in the 1. Bundesliga. In that league the team won two league titles in a row, followed by a 1997 triumph in the German Cup.

Having won the national title in 1995, the team acquired the right to participate in the CEV European Champions Cup. Their debut in the top European competition was impressive, and they led the formation until the final round of games. In the Final Four played in Bologna, however, the team was defeated by Las Daytona Modena. The title of vice-champion of Europe allowed the team to qualify to another club competition, the CEV Super Cup. In this event Dachau reached the final, and was beaten by another Italian team, Alpitour Diesel Cuneo.

Despite these impressive results in Germany and Europe, they had training difficulties and a financial crisis, which made the team go back to the second division, before returning to the top flight. A new corporate crisis occurred in 2002, and this time the team was forced to start from a lower league. In later years he regained a place in the 3. Bundesliga.

== Honours ==
German League

- Winners (2): 1994-95, 1995-96

German Cup

- Winners (1): 1996-97

CEV Champions League

- Runners-up (1): 1995-96

CEV Super Cup

- Runners-up (1): 1996

DBVVM U15

- Winners: 2024
