= Nehemiah Mote =

Australian volleyball player (born 1993)

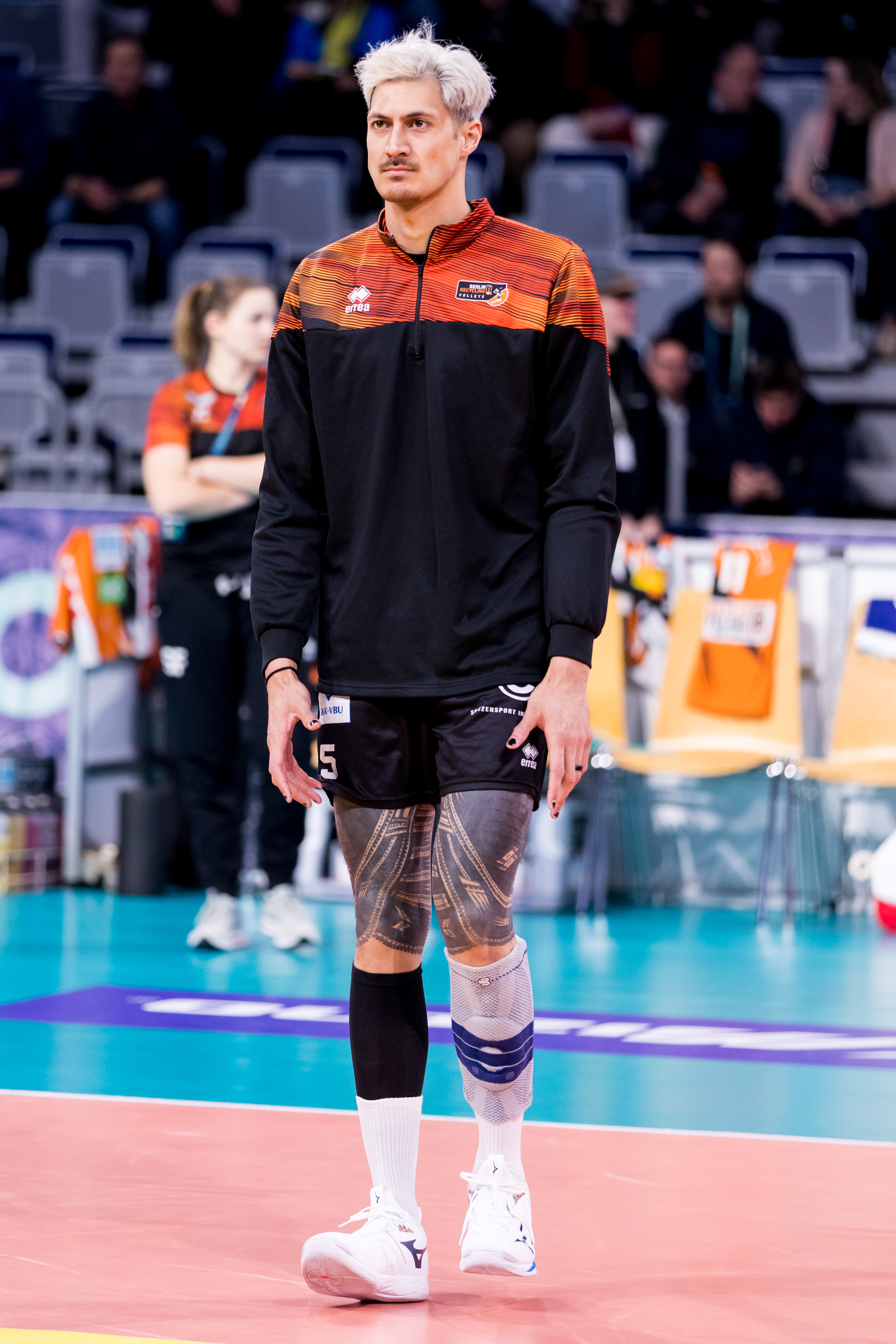

Personal information
- Nationality: Australian
- Born: 21 June 1993 (age 33) Campsie, NSW
- Height: 2.03 m (6 ft 8 in)
- Weight: 100 kg (220 lb)
- Spike: 367 cm (144 in)
- Block: 354 cm (139 in)

Volleyball information
- Position: Middle blocker
- Current club: Berlin Recycling Volleys

Career
- Years: Team
- 2021-present 2019-2021 2016-2019 2014-2016 2012-2014: Berlin Volleys; VfB Friedrichshafen; Volley Amriswil; Berlin Volleys; Volleyball Bisons Bühl; AIS

National team
- Years: Team
- 2013: Australia U-23; Australia

Nehemiah Mote (born 21 June 1993) is an Australian volleyball player. Nehemiah was offered an AIS (Australian Institute of Sport) scholarship in 2013 after a three-month trial, and represented NSW at the Australian Junior Volleyball Championships. He was selected to represent Australia for the first time in the Under 23's Junior World Championships in Brazil. He previously played for TV Bühl, VfB Friedrichshafen, and Berlin Recycling Volleys in Germany and Volley Amriswil in Switzerland. He returned to Berlin Recycling Volleys in 2021.

He represented Australia at the 2014 FIVB Volleyball Men's World Championship in Poland and the 2021 FIVB Volleyball Nations League. His father represented Samoa in Volleyball.
