= Daniel Malescha =

German volleyball player (born 1994)

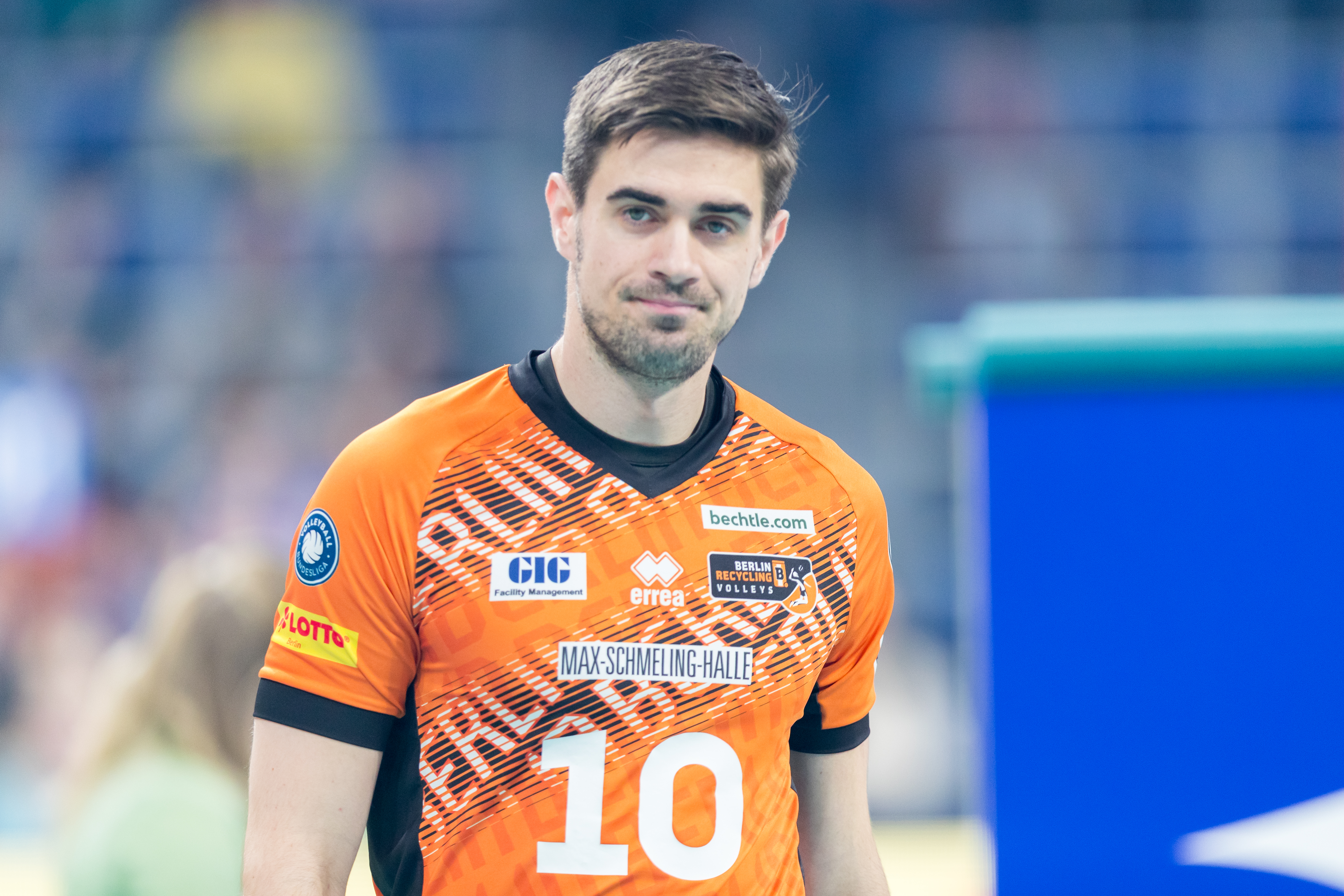
- Malescha in 2025

Personal information
- Nationality: German
- Born: 28 April 1994 (age 32); Munich
- Height: 6 ft 8 in (2.03 m)
- Weight: 198 lb (90 kg)
- Spike: 130 in (330 cm)
- Block: 124 in (315 cm)

Volleyball information
- Position: Opposite
- Current club: (Germany) United Volleys Frankfurt

Career
| Years | Teams |
|---|---|
| 2012–2013; 2013–2014; 2014–2016; 2016–2020; 2020– | (Germany) VC Olympia Berlin (Germany) VSG Coburg/Grub (Germany) TSV Herrsching (Germany) VfB Friedrichshafen (Germany) United Volleys Frankfurt |

Daniel Malescha (born 28 April 1994 in Munich) is a German volleyball player, a member of the club United Volleys Frankfurt.

== Sporting achievements ==
=== Clubs ===
German Cup:

- 2016, 2017, 2018

German SuperCup:

- 2017, 2018, 2019

Deutsche Championship:

- 2017, 2018, 2019
