= Ruben Schott =

German volleyball player (born 1994)

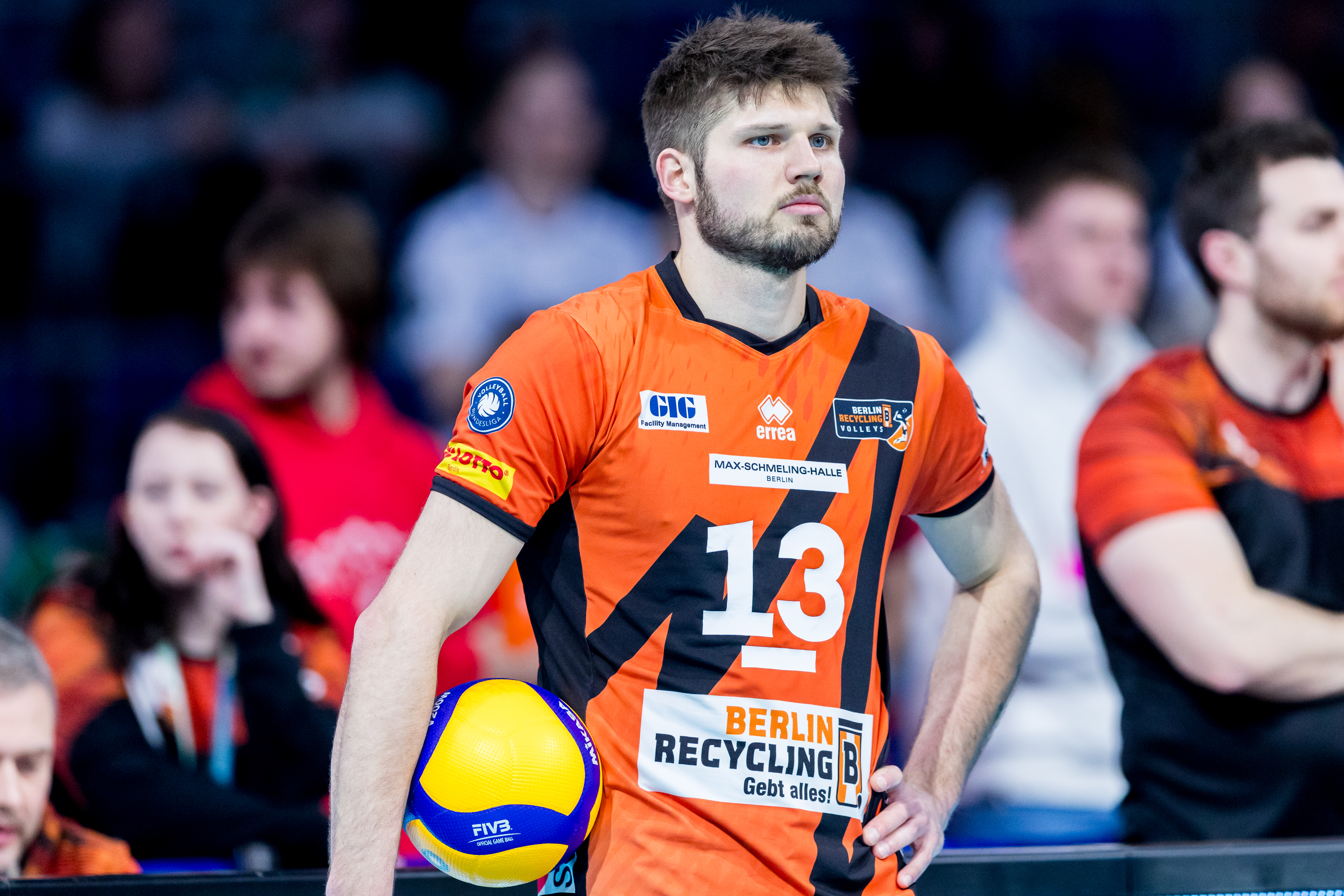
- Schott in 2024

Personal information
- Born: 8 July 1994 (age 32); Berlin, Germany
- Height: 1.92 m (6 ft 4 in)
- Weight: 89 kg (196 lb)
- Spike: 343 cm (135 in)

Volleyball information
- Position: Outside hitter
- Current club: Berlin Recycling Volleys
- Number: 3

Career
Years	Teams
2013–2014; 2014–2015; 2015–2017; 2017–2018; 2018–2020; 2020–2021; 2021–	Berlin Recycling Volleys; CV Mitteldeutschland; Berlin Recycling Volleys; Revivre Milano; Trefl Gdańsk; AZS Olsztyn; Berlin Recycling Volleys

National team
Germany
Honours
Men's volleyball
Representing Germany
CEV European Championship
Silver medal – second place	2017 Poland

Ruben Schott (born 8 July 1994) is a German professional volleyball player who plays as an outside hitter for Berlin Recycling Volleys and as an outside hitter and libero for the Germany national team.

== Honours ==
=== Club ===
- CEV Cup
  - 2015–16 – with Berlin Recycling Volleys
- Domestic
  - 2013–14 German Championship, with Berlin Recycling Volleys
  - 2015–16 German Cup, with Berlin Recycling Volleys
  - 2015–16 German Championship, with Berlin Recycling Volleys
  - 2016–17 German Championship, with Berlin Recycling Volleys
  - 2021–22 German SuperCup, with Berlin Recycling Volleys
  - 2021–22 German Championship, with Berlin Recycling Volleys
  - 2022–23 German SuperCup, with Berlin Recycling Volleys
  - 2022–23 German Cup, with Berlin Recycling Volleys
  - 2022–23 German Championship, with Berlin Recycling Volleys
  - 2023–24 German SuperCup, with Berlin Recycling Volleys
  - 2023–24 German Cup, with Berlin Recycling Volleys
  - 2023–24 German Championship, with Berlin Recycling Volleys
  - 2024–25 German SuperCup, with Berlin Recycling Volleys

=== Individual awards ===
- 2015: German SuperCup – Most valuable player

=== Statistics ===
- 2020–21 PlusLiga – Best receiver
