= Moritz Reichert =

German volleyball player (born 1995)

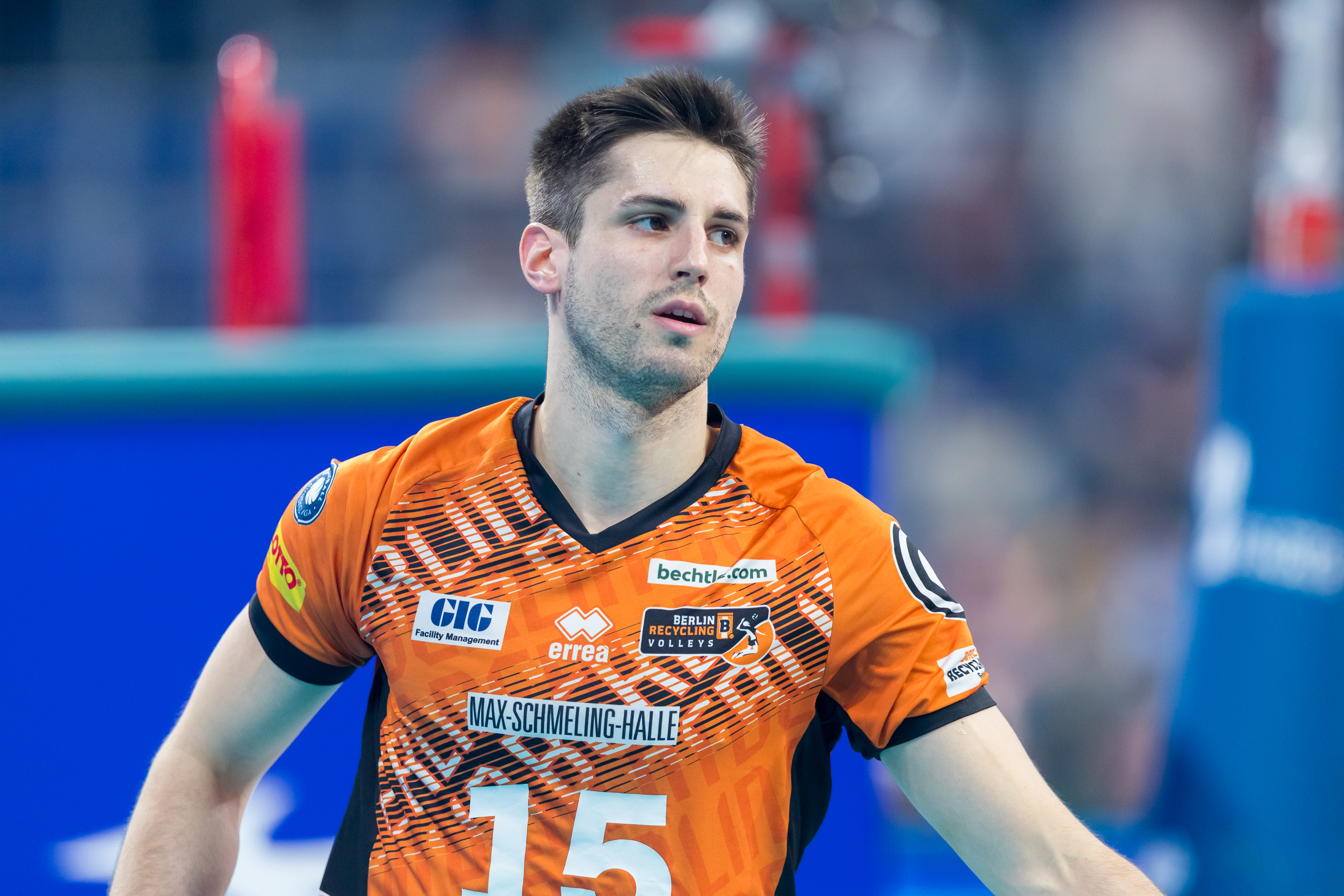
- Reichert in 2025

Personal information
- Born: 15 March 1995 (age 31); Lebach, Germany
- Height: 1.95 m (6 ft 5 in)
- Weight: 88 kg (194 lb)
- Spike: 345 cm (136 in)
- Block: 325 cm (128 in)

Volleyball information
- Position: Outside hitter
- Current club: Ślepsk Suwałki
- Number: 15

Career
| Years | Teams |
|---|---|
| 2014–2015; 2015–2017; 2017–2018; 2018–2020; 2020–2022; 2022–2023; 2023–2024; 2024–2026; 2026– | VfB Friedrichshafen; United Volleys Frankfurt; Tours VB; Berlin Recycling Volleys; Trefl Gdańsk; Tourcoing LM; Montpellier Volley; Berlin Recycling Volleys; Ślepsk Suwałki |

National team
| Germany |

Moritz Reichert (born 15 March 1995) is a German professional volleyball player who plays as an outside hitter for Ślepsk Suwałki and the Germany national team.

== Honours ==
=== Club ===
- Domestic
  - 2014–15 German Cup, with VfB Friedrichshafen
  - 2014–15 German Championship, with VfB Friedrichshafen
  - 2017–18 French Championship, with Tours VB
  - 2018–19 German Championship, with Berlin Recycling Volleys
  - 2019–20 German SuperCup, with Berlin Recycling Volleys
  - 2019–20 German Cup, with Berlin Recycling Volleys
  - 2024–25 German SuperCup, with Berlin Recycling Volleys
  - 2024–25 German Cup, with Berlin Recycling Volleys
  - 2024–25 German Championship, with Berlin Recycling Volleys
  - 2025–26 German SuperCup, with Berlin Recycling Volleys
  - 2025–26 German Championship, with Berlin Recycling Volleys
