= Erhard Wunderlich =

German handball player (1956-2012)

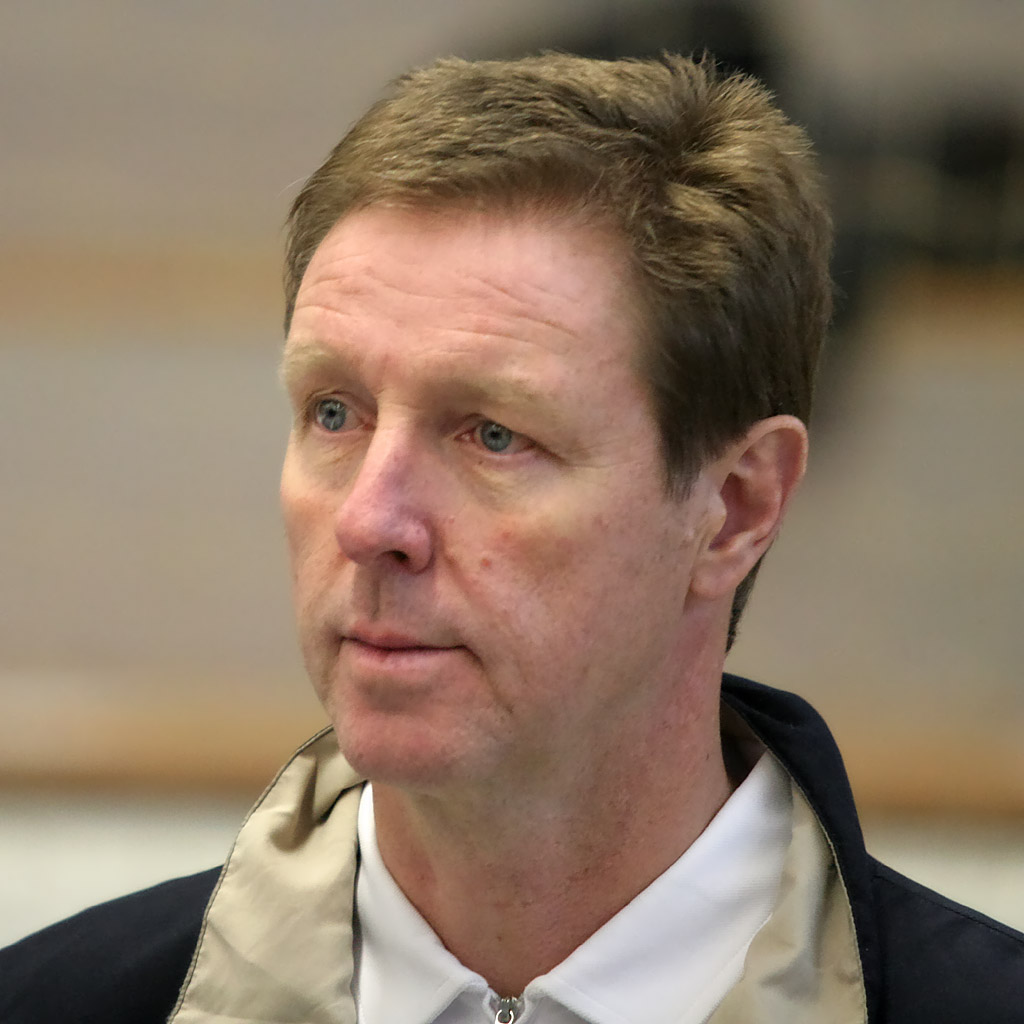

Personal information
- Nationality: German
- Born: 14 December 1956 Augsburg, Germany
- Died: 4 October 2012 (aged 55)
- Height: 204 m (669 ft)

Sport
- Sport: Handball
- Position: Left back

Senior clubs
- Years: Team
- –1976: FC Augsburg
- 1976–1983: VfL Gummersbach
- 1983–1984: FC Barcelona
- 1984–1989: TSV Milbertshofen
- 1989–1991: VfL Bad Schwartau
- 1993: TSV Milbertshofen
National team
Years	Team	Apps	(Gls)
1976–1986	West Germany	140	(504)
Medal record
Olympic Games
Silver medal – second place	1984 Los Angeles	Team
World Championship
Gold medal – first place	1978 Denmark	Team

Erhard "Sepp" Wunderlich (14 December 1956 – 4 October 2012) was a German handball player.

Wunderlich was born in Augsburg. As a member of the West German handball team, he won the 1978 World Men's Handball Championship and the silver medal at the 1984 Summer Olympics. At the latter tournament he played all six matches and scored 22 goals.

He played club handball for the VfL Gummersbach from 1976 to 1983 when he left to join FC Barcelona. He later returned to Germany to play for the TSV Milbertshofen. During his club career he won four European Cups and two German Championships. In 1999 he was voted German Handballer of the Century.

He died, aged 55, in Cologne of skin cancer. He was buried in his home town Augsburg, as was his last wish, on 10 October 2012.
