= Berlin Recycling Volleys =

German volleyball club

- Full name: SCC Volleyball Marketing GmbH (company); Sport-Club Charlottenburg e.V. (club)
- Founded: 1991
- Ground: Max-Schmeling-Halle (Capacity: 9,000)
- Chairman: Kaweh Niroomand
- Manager: Andrea Anastasi
- League: Bundesliga
- 2024–25: Champions
- Website: Club home page

Uniforms
Home	Away

The Berlin Recycling Volleys is a professional men's volleyball team founded in 1989 and based in Berlin, Germany. They are a section of SCC Berlin and compete in the German Bundesliga and the CEV Champions League.

== History ==
In 1989 the volleyball section of VdS Berlin (Verein der Saunafreunde) joined SC Charlottenburg in West Berlin. In 1991 the volleyball section of SC Berlin (former SC Dynamo Berlin of East Berlin) merged into SCC as well. Until 2011, the team was known as SCC Berlin when it received its current sponsor name.

Before moving to the Max-Schmeling-Halle in 2011, the team played in the Sömmeringhalle in Charlottenburg.

== Honours ==
=== Domestic ===
- Volleyball Bundesliga

Winners (15): 1992–93, 2002–03, 2003–04, 2011–12, 2012–13, 2013–14, 2015–16, 2016–17, 2017–18, 2018–19, 2020–21, 2021–22, 2022–23, 2023–24, 2024–25

- German Cup

Winners (8): 1993–94, 1995–96, 1999–2000, 2015–16, 2019–20, 2022–23, 2023–24, 2024–25

- German SuperCup

Winners (6): 2019–20, 2020–21, 2021–22, 2022–23, 2023–24, 2024–25

=== International ===
- CEV Champions League

Final Four (2): 2014–15, 2016–17

- CEV Cup

Winners (1): 2015–16

- CEV Challenge Cup

Bronze (2): 1998–99, 2009–10

== Team ==
As of 2024–25 season

No.	Name	Date of birth	Position
1	(Poland) Adam Kowalski	16 September 1994 (age 32)	libero
2	(United States) Matthew Knigge	2 June 1996 (age 28)	middle blocker
5	(Australia) Nehemiah Mote	21 June 1993 (age 33)	middle blocker
6	(Germany) Johannes Tille	7 May 1997 (age 29)	setter
7	(Belgium) Simon Plaskie	10 March 2001 (age 23)	outside hitter
9	(Germany) Djifa Amedegnato	17 September 2003 (age 20)	setter
10	(Germany) Daniel Malescha	28 April 1994 (age 30)	opposite
12	(Poland) Jan Fornal	14 January 1995 (age 29)	outside hitter
13	(Germany) Ruben Schott	8 July 1994 (age 32)	outside hitter
15	(Germany) Moritz Reichert	15 March 1995 (age 29)	outside hitter
18	(Germany) Florian Krage	11 January 1997 (age 27)	middle blocker
21	(Germany) Tobias Krick	22 October 1998 (age 25)	middle blocker
22	(United States) Jake Hanes	3 May1998 (age 26)	opposite
24	(United States) Kyle Dagostino	18 May 1995 (age 29)	libero
Head coach:		(United Kingdom) Joel Banks	

Transfers ahead of the 2024-25 Season

Arrivals 2024		Departures 2024	
Player	from	Player	to
Djifa Amedegnato	Netzhoppers Königs Wusterhausen	Timothée Carle	Jastrzębski Węgiel
Kyle Dagostino	Narbonne Volley	Leon Dervisaj	unknown
Jan Fornal	VfB Friedrichshafen	Cody Kessel	VC Greenyard Maaseik
Jake Hanes	Cuprum Lubin	Marek Šotola	Halkbank Ankara
Matthew Knigge	SVG Lüneburg	Sašo Štalekar	ACH Volley Ljubljana
Florian Krage	Spacer’s Toulouse	Robert Täht	Stilon Gorzów Wielkopolski
Simon Plaskie	Knack Roeselare	Timo Tammemaa	unknown
Moritz Reichert	Montpellier Volley	Satoshi Tsuiki	unknown
