= Deutsche Volleyball-Bundesliga =

Sports league in Germany

- Current season, competition or edition: 2026–27 Volleyball-Bundesliga season
- Sport: Volleyball
- Founded: 1974; 52 years ago
- No. of teams: 12
- Country: Germany
- Confederation: CEV
- Continent: Europe
- Most recent champion: Berlin Recycling Volleys (2025–26)
- Most titles: Berlin Recycling Volleys (16 titles)
- Broadcaster: Sport1
- Relegation to: 2. Bundesliga
- Domestic cups: German Cup; German Super Cup
- International cups: CEV Champions League; CEV Cup; CEV Challenge Cup
- Website: volleyball-bundesliga.de

Volleyball Bundesliga (German: Volleyball Bundesliga der Männer), is the highest level of men's volleyball in Germany, a professional league competition for volleyball clubs located in this country.

VfB Friedrichshafen and Berlin Recycling Volleys are the most successful teams with 13 championship victories.

== Volleyball-Bundesliga teams – 2023/2024 ==
Team	Arena	Location	Capacity
Berlin Recycling Volleys	Max-Schmeling-Halle	Berlin	8,533
VfB Friedrichshafen	Arena Ulm/Neu-Ulm	Friedrichshafen	6,200
FT 1844 Freiburg	Burdahalle (FT-Sportpark)	Freiburg	1,200
Helios Grizzlys Giesen	Volksbank-Arena	Giesen	2,408
SWD Powervolleys Düren	Arena Kreis Düren	Düren	2,878
Baden Volleys SSC Karlsruhe	Lina-Radke-Halle	Karlsruhe	1,500
WWK Volleys Herrsching	Nikolaushalle	Herrsching	1,010
Netzhoppers KW	Landkost-Arena	Königs Wusterhausen	1,000
SVG Lüneburg	LKH Arena	Lüneburg	3,500
VC Bitterfeld-Wolfen	Sporthalle Krondorf	Bitterfeld-Wolfen	919
ASV Dachau	Georg-Scherer-Halle	Dachau	1,150
TSV Unterhaching	Bayernwerk Sportarena	Unterhaching	1,512

Location of 2023–24 Volleyball-Bundesliga teams

== Performance by club ==
Team	Championships	Years
Berlin Recycling Volleys	16	1992–93, 2002–03, 2003–04, 2011–12, 2012–13, 2013–14, 2015–16, 2016–17, 2017–18, 2018–19, 2020–21, 2021–22, 2022–23, 2023–24, 2024–25, 2025–26
VfB Friedrichshafen	13	1997–98, 1998–99, 1999–00, 2000–01, 2001–02, 2004–05, 2005–06, 2006–07, 2007–08, 2008–09, 2009–10, 2010–11, 2014–15
Bayer Wuppertal	2	1993–94, 1996–97
ASV Dachau	2	1994–95, 1995–96
Moerser SC	1	1991–92

== See also ==
- German Volleyball Cup
- German Men's Volleyball Super Cup
- German Women's Volleyball League
- Sports in Germany
