= Jan Fornal =

Polish volleyball player (born 1995)

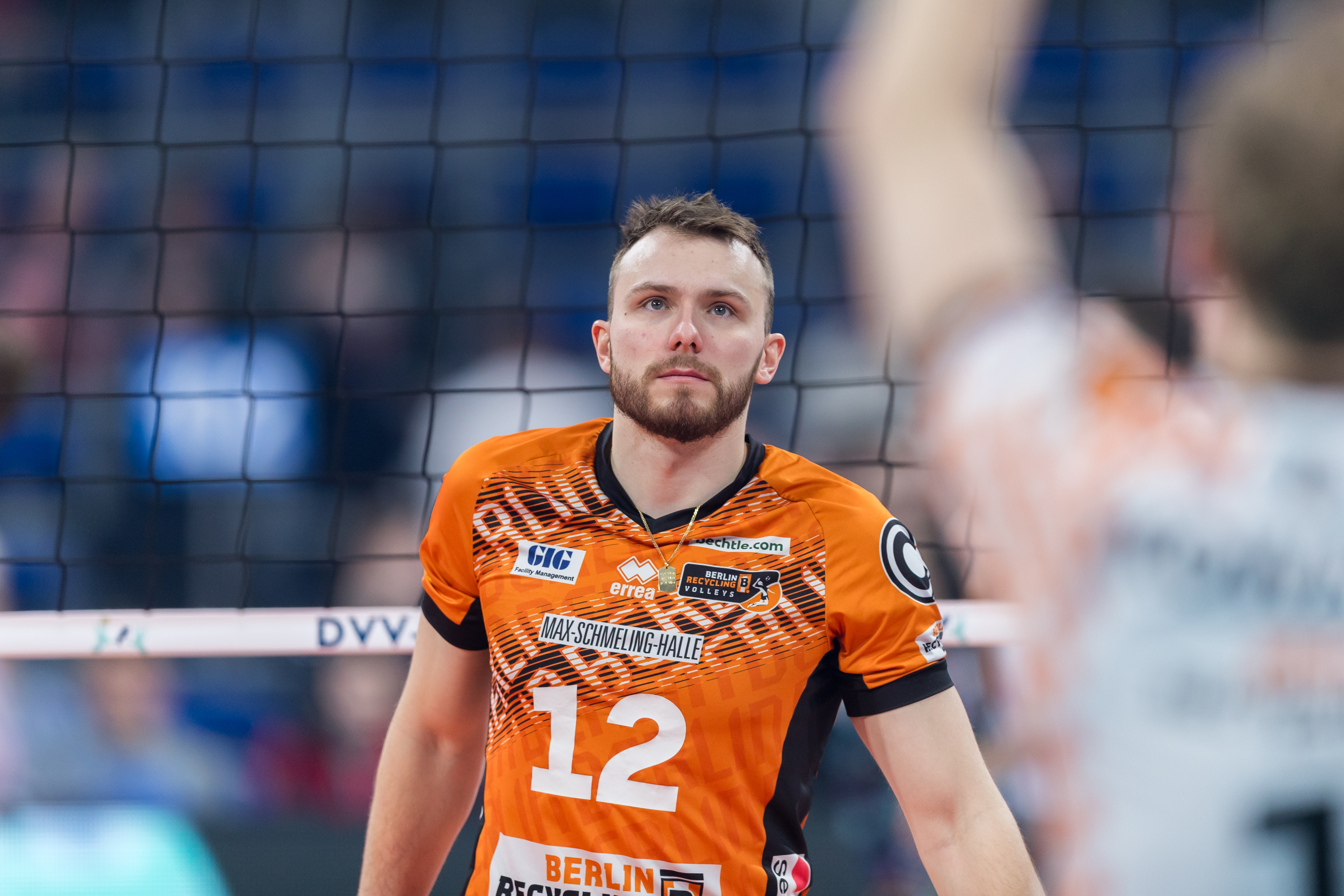

Personal information
- Full name: Jan Bożydar Fornal
- Born: 14 January 1995 (age 31); Szczecin, Poland
- Height: 1.91 m (6 ft 3 in)
- Weight: 83 kg (183 lb)
- Spike: 345 cm (136 in)
- Block: 317 cm (125 in)

Volleyball information
- Position: Outside hitter
- Current club: Berlin Recycling Volleys
- Number: 12

Career
Years	Teams
2014–2015; 2015–2018; 2018–2020; 2020–2022; 2022–2023; 2023–2024; 2024–2025	KPS Siedlce; AZS AGH Kraków; MKS Będzin; Projekt Warsaw; Gwardia Wrocław; VfB Friedrichshafen; Berlin Recycling Volleys

Jan Bożydar Fornal (born 14 January 1995) is a Polish professional volleyball player who plays as an outside hitter for Berlin Recycling Volleys. He competed for Poland in the 2013 U19 World Championship held in Mexico.

== Personal life ==
His father, Marek is a former volleyball player. He has a younger brother, Tomasz.

== Honours ==
=== Club ===
- Domestic
  - 2024–25 German SuperCup, with Berlin Recycling Volleys
  - 2024–25 German Cup, with Berlin Recycling Volleys
  - 2024–25 German Championship, with Berlin Recycling Volleys

=== Youth national team ===
- 2013 CEV U19 European Championship
