= TSV Milbertshofen =

German sports club

- Full name: Turn- und Sportverein München-Milbertshofen e. V.
- Founded: May 11, 1905; 120 years ago
- Club colours

TSV Milbertshofen is a sports club based in Milbertshofen a suburb in the north of Munich, Germany. The club, which can trace its history back to 1905 (120 years ago), achieved its greatest successes in handball, volleyball, table tennis and football. Other sports supported by the club include basketball, tennis, boxing, aikido, judo, karate, taekwondo, track and field, wheelchair-rugby, shooting, skiing, gymnastics and yoga.

== Accomplishments ==
=== Handball ===
- 1990 German Cup and runner-up in the German Championship
- 1991 EHF Cup Winner's Cup
- 1992 EHF Cup Winner's Cup-finalist

The most famous player is Erhard Wunderlich (1984–1989). He also served the club as manager from 1990 to 1992. Erhard Wunderlich was elected Germany's player of the century in 1999.

=== Volleyball ===
- 1990 German Cup
- 1991 German Championship

=== Table tennis ===
- 1952 German Team Championship
- 1958 German Team Championship

The most famous player is Conny Freundorfer (*1936–†1988, between 1953 and 1961 nine times German singles champion), who joined the club in 1954. Peter Stellwag, between 1977 and 1981 four times German singles champion, played for the club between 1990 and 1992.

=== Football ===
Despite not having achieved any major titles in this sport, the club prides itself of having developed a number of players in more recent years that eventually managed to establish themselves in the higher leagues of Germany.

The clubs football side reached its pinnacle when it won promotion to the tier-four Landesliga Bayern-Süd in 1968. It suffered relegation from this level in 1971 and has not returned to it since. Since 2015–16, the team is playing in the tier-eight Kreisliga.

These days the club does not belong to the national top tier in any of these sports.
