= German Volleyball Cup =

- Sport: Volleyball
- Founded: 1973
- First season: 1973
- Administrator: DVV
- Country: Germany
- Continent: Europe
- Most recent champions: Berlin Recycling Volleys (8th title)
- Most titles: VfB Friedrichshafen (17 titles)
- Broadcaster: Sport 1
- Streaming partner: Dyn / Twitch
- Website: DVV-Pokal.de

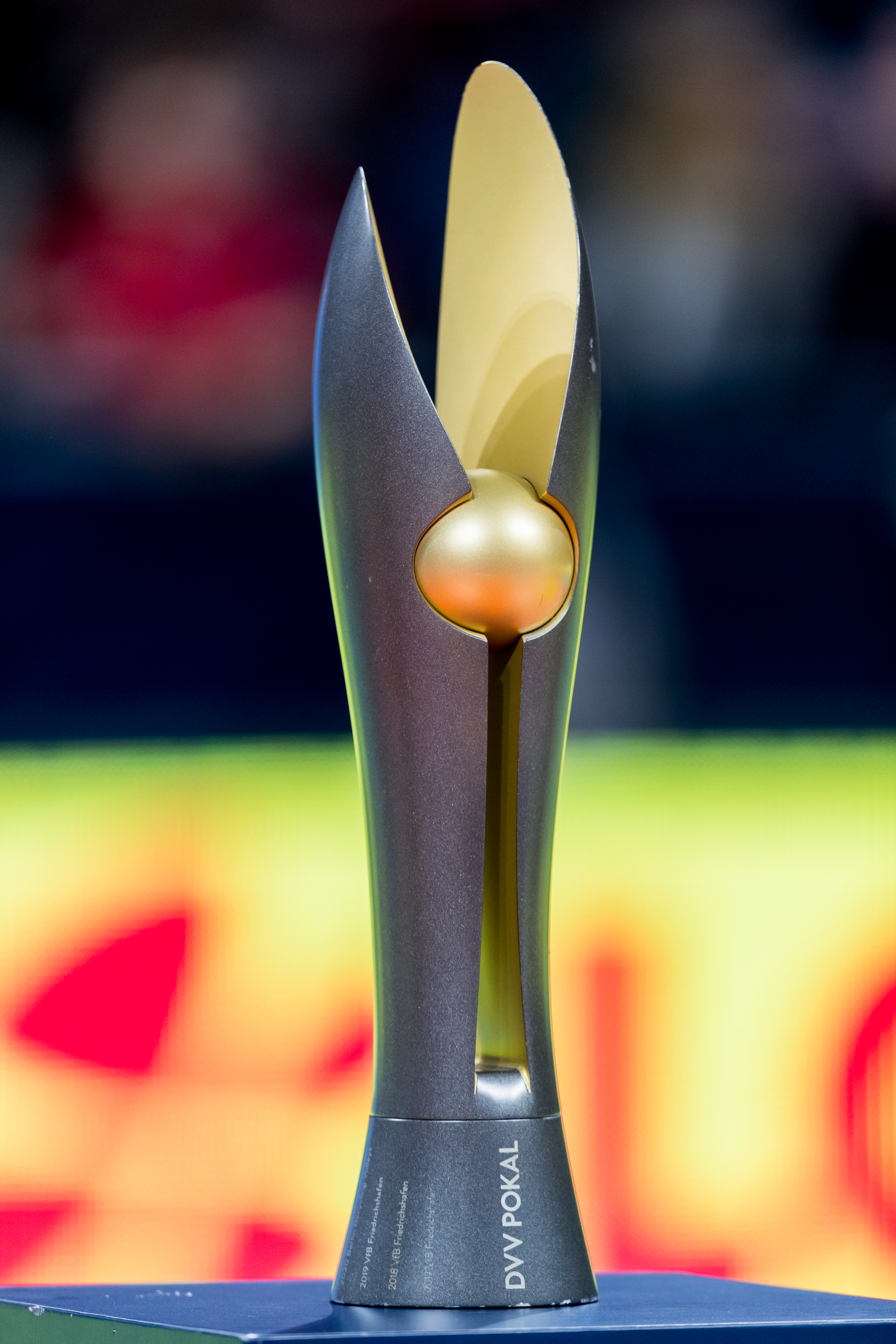
DVV-Pokal trophy

The DVV-Pokal is the national cup competition of German volleyball . The organizer is the German Volleyball Association (DVV). The finals have been held in the SAP Arena in Mannheim since 2016 . The current title holders in 2021 are the United Volleys Frankfurt.

== Competition history ==
The DVV Cup has been held since 1973. Its East German counterpart was the FDGB Cup under the direction of the German Sports Association Volleyball of the GDR (DSVB), which was held between 1953 and 1991.

From 2006 to 2015 the finals took place in the Gerry Weber Stadium in Halle. In April 2015, the DVV announced that there was a new venue. Since February 28, 2016, the finals have been held in the SAP Arena in Mannheim. In March 2018, the German Volleyball Association, the Volleyball Bundesliga and the operators of the SAP Arena agreed to extend the two-year contract by two more years until 2020. The contract, which expires in 2020, was again extended to at least 2025.

== Winners list ==
Years	Champions
1973	TSV 1860 München
1974	Hamburger SV
1975	TSV 1860 München
1976	USC Münster
1977	Hamburger SV
1978	TSV 1860 München
1979	TSV 1860 München
1980	TSV 1860 München
1981	VBC Paderborn
1982	VC Passau
1983	Hamburger SV
1984	USC Gießen
1985	Hamburger SV
1986	VdS Berlin
1987	SC Fortuna Bonn
1988	Bayer 04 Leverkusen
1989	Hamburger SV
1990	TSV Milbertshofen

Years	Champions
Unified Germany Cup
1991	Moerser SC
1992	1. VC Hamburg
1993	Moerser SC
1994	SCC Berlin
1995	SV Bayer Wuppertal
1996	SCC Berlin
1997	ASV Dachau
1998	VfB Friedrichshafen
1999	VfB Friedrichshafen
2000	SCC Berlin
2001	VfB Friedrichshafen
2002	VfB Friedrichshafen
2003	VfB Friedrichshafen
2004	VfB Friedrichshafen
2005	VfB Friedrichshafen
2006	VfB Friedrichshafen
2007	VfB Friedrichshafen

Years	Champions
2008	VfB Friedrichshafen
2009	Generali Haching
2010	Generali Haching
2011	Generali Haching
2012	VfB Friedrichshafen
2013	Generali Haching
2014	VfB Friedrichshafen
2015	VfB Friedrichshafen
2016	Berlin Recycling Volleys
2017	VfB Friedrichshafen
2018	VfB Friedrichshafen
2019	VfB Friedrichshafen
2020	Berlin Recycling Volleys
2021	United Volleys Frankfurt
2022	VfB Friedrichshafen
2023	Berlin Recycling Volleys
2024	Berlin Recycling Volleys
2025	
