= VfB Friedrichshafen =

German sports club

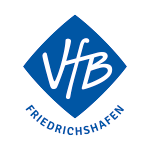
- Logo VfB Friedrichshafen Volleyball
- Full name: Verein für Bewegungsspiele Friedrichshafen
- Short name: Häfler
- Founded: 1969
- Ground: SPACETECH ARENA
- Chairman: Jochen Benz
- Manager: Adam Swaczyna
- Captain: Marcus Böhme
- League: Bundesliga
- 2022–23: 2nd place
- Website: Club home page

Uniforms
Home	Away

VfB Friedrichshafen Volleyball GmbH is a German professional men's volleyball club founded in 1969 and based in Friedrichshafen, southern Baden-Württemberg. Main stakeholder is VfB Friedrichshafen e.V. The club plays in the German Bundesliga and the CEV Champions League.

The team won the 2006–07 CEV Champions League title. From 2005 to 2011 they won the German league seven times in a row. In total, VfB Friedrichshafen won the championship 13 times and the German cup 17 times.

Just before the start of the 2020–21 season the city of Friedrichshafen announced the ZF Arena, home of VfB Friedrichshafen since 2004, is closed immediately due to possible rust in the roof structure. After being forced to train in small gyms and to swap home games with the opponents, VfB Friedrichshafen moved to Zeppelin Cat Hall A1 which is a hall of the Friedrichshafen fair. The first match in the new arena was against Berlin Recycling Volleys, and took place on 21 November 2020.

== History ==
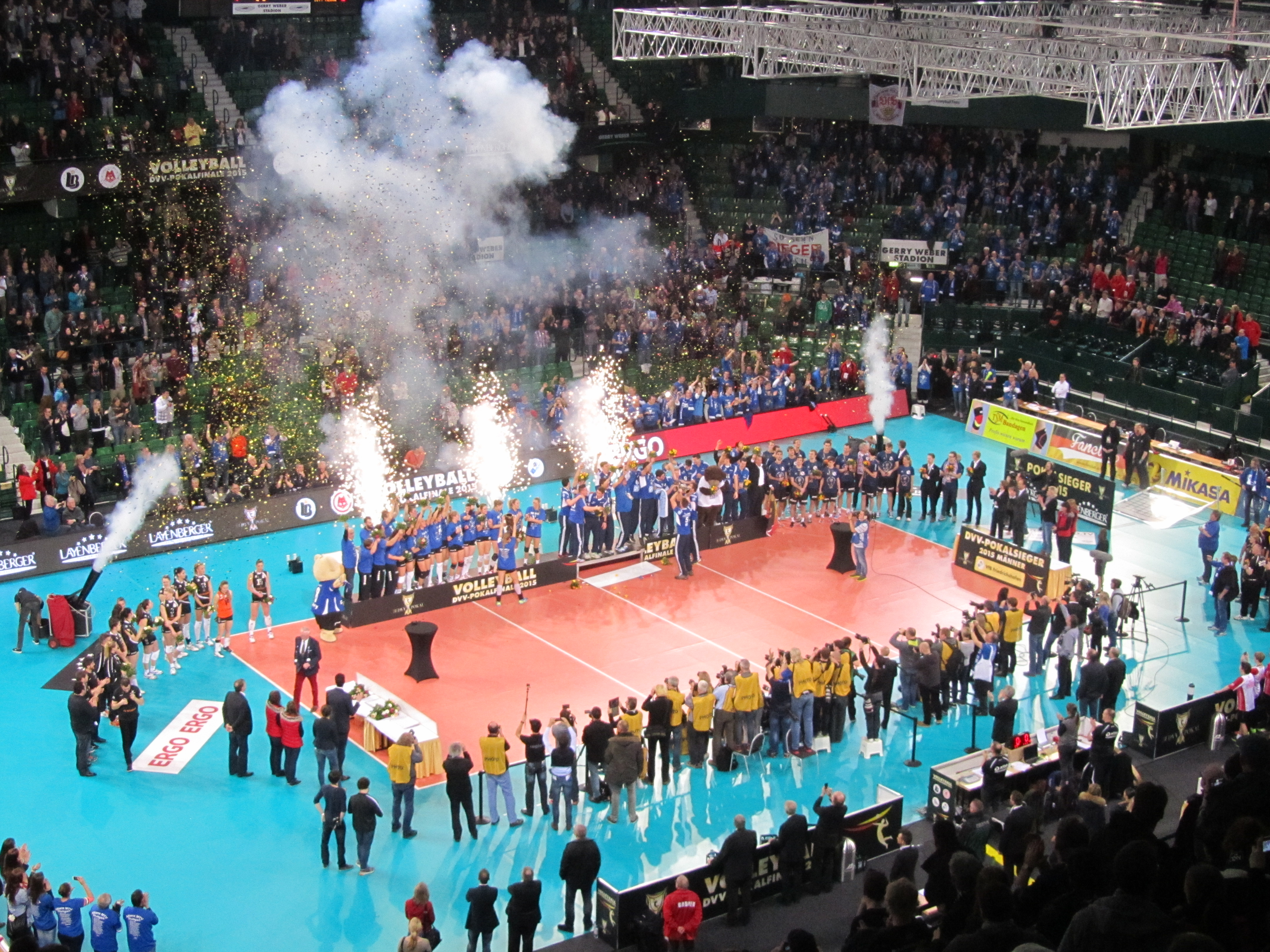
VfB Friedrichshafen (on the right) wins 2015 DVV-Pokal

Currently, the club has about 3,500 members in 23 sections and 30 disciplines, making it the largest multi-discipline and multi-generational club in Friedrichshafen and one of the largest in Baden-Württemberg. VfB Friedrichshafen sees itself as a sports club for all social groups. With its diverse range of sports, it is a lifelong promoter of health, exercise and sport and, through the cultivation of social togetherness, an essential social pillar of the common good in Friedrichshafen. The men's main volleyball team is the most successful team in the Bundesliga.

Continuously playing in the 1st Volleyball Bundesliga since 1987, they have won the German Championship 13 times, the German Cup 17 times and the German Supercup three times. In 2007 they won the Champions League. In 2000, VfB Friedrichshafen Volleyball GmbH, a commercial enterprise, was founded to realize the separation of the professionals from the amateurs. The team of the badminton section also played in the first Bundesliga. In addition, there are 21 other sections, including the soccer team, which also played in the first division in the 1930s and 1940s. The club has a full-time office, but is run on a voluntary basis.

Jochen Benz has been president since December 21, 2022.

== Honours ==
=== Domestic ===
- Volleyball Bundesliga

Winners (13): 1997–98, 1998–99, 1999–2000, 2000–01, 2001–02, 2004–05, 2005–06, 2006–07, 2007–08, 2008–09, 2009–10, 2010–11, 2014–15

- German Cup

Winners (17): 1997–98, 1998–99, 2000–01, 2001–02, 2002–03, 2003–04, 2004–05, 2005–06, 2006–07, 2007–08, 2011–12, 2013–14, 2014–15, 2016–17, 2017–18, 2018–19, 2021–22

- German SuperCup

Winners (3): 2015–16, 2016–17, 2017–18

=== International ===
- CEV Champions League

Winners (1): 2006–07

- CEV European Champions Cup

Silver (1): 1999–2000

- CEV Challenge Cup

Bronze (1): 1993–94

== Team ==
As of 2023–24 season

No.	Name	Date of birth	Position
1	(Cuba) José Israel Masso Alvarez	2 December 1997 (age 27)	middle blocker
3	(Puerto Rico) Sergio Carrillo	10 July 2000 (age 24)	setter
4	(Germany) Tim Peter	8 September 1997 (age 27)	outside hitter
6	(Poland) Michał Superlak	16 November 1993 (age 31)	opposite
8	(Serbia) Aleksa Batak	18 January 2000 (age 25)	setter
9	(Finland) Severi Savonsalmi	21 August 2000 (age 24)	middle blocker
10	(Serbia) Nikola Peković	6 March 1990 (age 35)	libero
11	(Germany) Marcus Böhme	25 August 1985 (age 39)	middle blocker
12	(Poland) Jan Fornal	14 January 1995 (age 30)	outside hitter
14	(Trinidad and Tobago) Marc-Anthony Honoré	12 June 1984 (age 40)	middle blocker
15	(Germany) Simon Kohn	5 August 2004 (age 20)	outside hitter
16	(Canada) Jackson Young	29 July 2001 (age 23)	outside hitter
18	(Denmark) Simon Tabermann Uhrenholt	17 June 2004 (age 20)	opposite
Head coach:		(Australia) Mark Lebedew	
