= 2022–23 Polish Men's Volleyball Cup =

2022–23 Polish Volleyball Cup
- Sport: Volleyball
- Duration: 25–26 February 2023
- Total attendance: 29,815 (9,938 per match)
- TV partner: Polsat Sport

Finals
- Champions: ZAKSA Kędzierzyn-Koźle (10th title)
- Finals MVP: Aleksander Śliwka (POL)

Seasons
- ← 2021–22 2023–24 →

The 2022–23 Polish Cup was the 66th edition of the Polish Volleyball Cup tournament.

ZAKSA Kędzierzyn-Koźle beat Jastrzębski Węgiel in the final (3–0) and won their tenth Polish Cup. Aleksander Śliwka was named MVP of the finals.

== Final four ==
- Venue: Tauron Arena, Kraków
- All times are Central European Time (UTC+01:00).

Semifinals
25 February
Aluron CMC Warta Zawiercie	0
ZAKSA Kędzierzyn-Koźle	3
25 February
Jastrzębski Węgiel	3
Asseco Resovia	0

Final
26 February
ZAKSA Kędzierzyn-Koźle	3
Jastrzębski Węgiel	0

=== Semifinals ===
Date	Time		Score		Set 1	Set 2	Set 3	Set 4	Set 5	Total	Report
25 Feb	14:45	Aluron CMC Warta Zawiercie	0–3	ZAKSA Kędzierzyn-Koźle	18–25	20–25	19–25			57–75	Report
25 Feb	18:00	Jastrzębski Węgiel	3–0	Asseco Resovia	25–17	25–19	25–17			75–53	Report

=== Final ===
Date	Time		Score		Set 1	Set 2	Set 3	Set 4	Set 5	Total	Report
26 Feb	14:45	ZAKSA Kędzierzyn-Koźle	3–0	Jastrzębski Węgiel	26–24	29–27	25–23			80–74	Report

== Final standings ==
Qualified for the 2023 Polish SuperCup

Rank	Team
1st place, gold medalist(s)	ZAKSA Kędzierzyn-Koźle
2	Jastrzębski Węgiel
Semifinalists	Aluron CMC Warta Zawiercie; Asseco Resovia

2022–23 Polish Cup winners
ZAKSA Kędzierzyn-Koźle
10th title

== Squads ==
Aluron CMC Warta Zawiercie
No.	Name	Date of birth	Height	Position
1	(Poland) Marcin Waliński	24 October 1990	1.96 m (6 ft 5 in)	outside hitter
2	(Poland) Bartosz Kwolek	17 July 1997	1.93 m (6 ft 4 in)	outside hitter
4	(Poland) Krzysztof Rejno	22 February 1993	2.03 m (6 ft 8 in)	middle blocker
5	(Poland) Miłosz Zniszczoł	2 July 1986	2.00 m (6 ft 7 in)	middle blocker
6	(Poland) Dawid Konarski	31 August 1989	1.98 m (6 ft 6 in)	opposite
8	(Poland) Tomasz Kalembka	30 June 1991	2.05 m (6 ft 9 in)	middle blocker
9	(Argentina) Santiago Danani	12 December 1995	1.76 m (5 ft 9 in)	libero
15	(Portugal) Miguel Tavares	2 March 1993	1.92 m (6 ft 4 in)	setter
16	(Poland) Bartosz Makoś	1 August 1998	1.76 m (5 ft 9 in)	libero
18	(Poland) Michał Kozłowski	16 February 1985	1.91 m (6 ft 3 in)	setter
19	(Poland) Dawid Dulski	1 November 2002	2.10 m (6 ft 11 in)	opposite
20	(Poland) Wiktor Rajsner	13 April 1999	2.05 m (6 ft 9 in)	middle blocker
25	(Poland) Michał Szalacha	15 January 1994	2.02 m (6 ft 8 in)	middle blocker
93	(Serbia) Uroš Kovačević	6 May 1993	1.97 m (6 ft 6 in)	outside hitter
99	(Poland) Patryk Łaba	30 July 1991	1.88 m (6 ft 2 in)	outside hitter
Head coach:		(Poland) Michał Winiarski		

Asseco Resovia
No.	Name	Date of birth	Height	Position
1	(Poland) Bartłomiej Krulicki	15 September 1993	2.05 m (6 ft 9 in)	middle blocker
2	(Poland) Maciej Muzaj	21 May 1994	2.07 m (6 ft 9 in)	opposite
3	(Poland) Michał Kędzierski	9 August 1994	1.94 m (6 ft 4 in)	setter
4	(Slovenia) Jan Kozamernik	24 December 1995	2.05 m (6 ft 9 in)	middle blocker
5	(Poland) Jakub Bucki	13 August 1988	1.97 m (6 ft 6 in)	opposite
6	(Brazil) Maurício Borges	4 February 1989	1.99 m (6 ft 6 in)	outside hitter
7	(Poland) Jakub Kochanowski	17 July 1997	1.99 m (6 ft 6 in)	middle blocker
8	(France) Thibault Rossard	28 August 1993	1.94 m (6 ft 4 in)	outside hitter
10	(Poland) Tomasz Piotrowski	2 September 1997	1.98 m (6 ft 6 in)	outside hitter
11	(Poland) Fabian Drzyzga	3 January 1990	1.96 m (6 ft 5 in)	setter
13	(Poland) Michał Potera	6 March 1988	1.83 m (6 ft 0 in)	libero
16	(Poland) Paweł Zatorski	21 June 1990	1.84 m (6 ft 0 in)	libero
17	(Poland) Bartłomiej Mordyl	21 January 1995	2.01 m (6 ft 7 in)	middle blocker
18	(Slovenia) Klemen Čebulj	21 February 1992	2.02 m (6 ft 8 in)	outside hitter
59	(United States) Torey DeFalco	10 April 1997	1.98 m (6 ft 6 in)	outside hitter
Head coach:		(Italy) Giampaolo Medei		

Jastrzębski Węgiel
No.	Name	Date of birth	Height	Position
1	(Poland) Dawid Dryja	21 July 1992	2.01 m (6 ft 7 in)	middle blocker
2	(Czech Republic) Jan Hadrava	3 June 1991	1.99 m (6 ft 6 in)	opposite
3	(Poland) Jakub Popiwczak	17 April 1996	1.80 m (5 ft 11 in)	libero
6	(France) Benjamin Toniutti	30 October 1989	1.83 m (6 ft 0 in)	setter
7	(Poland) Kamil Dębski	17 October 1997	1.98 m (6 ft 6 in)	outside hitter
8	(France) Stéphen Boyer	10 April 1996	1.96 m (6 ft 5 in)	opposite
9	(Poland) Łukasz Wiśniewski	3 February 1989	1.98 m (6 ft 6 in)	middle blocker
13	(Poland) Yuriy Gladyr	8 July 1984	2.02 m (6 ft 8 in)	middle blocker
14	(Finland) Eemi Tervaportti	26 July 1989	1.93 m (6 ft 4 in)	setter
17	(France) Trévor Clévenot	28 June 1994	2.00 m (6 ft 7 in)	outside hitter
18	(Poland) Maksymilian Granieczny	7 July 2005	1.77 m (5 ft 10 in)	libero
21	(Poland) Tomasz Fornal	31 August 1997	2.00 m (6 ft 7 in)	outside hitter
22	(Poland) Moustapha M'Baye	22 January 1992	1.98 m (6 ft 6 in)	middle blocker
26	(Poland) Rafał Szymura	29 August 1995	1.97 m (6 ft 6 in)	outside hitter
95	(Poland) Jakub Macyra	22 July 1995	2.02 m (6 ft 8 in)	middle blocker
Head coach:		(Argentina) Marcelo Méndez		

ZAKSA Kędzierzyn-Koźle
No.	Name	Date of birth	Height	Position
2	(Poland) Łukasz Kaczmarek	29 June 1994	2.04 m (6 ft 8 in)	opposite
4	(Poland) Przemysław Stępień	7 February 1994	1.85 m (6 ft 1 in)	setter
5	(Poland) Marcin Janusz	31 July 1994	1.91 m (6 ft 3 in)	setter
7	(Netherlands) Twan Wiltenburg	20 January 1997	2.04 m (6 ft 8 in)	middle blocker
8	(Poland) Adrian Staszewski	31 May 1990	1.98 m (6 ft 6 in)	outside hitter
9	(Poland) Bartłomiej Kluth	20 December 1992	2.10 m (6 ft 11 in)	opposite
10	(Poland) Bartosz Bednorz	25 July 1994	2.01 m (6 ft 7 in)	outside hitter
11	(Poland) Aleksander Śliwka	24 May 1995	1.97 m (6 ft 6 in)	outside hitter
15	(United States) David Smith	15 May 1985	2.01 m (6 ft 7 in)	middle blocker
19	(Ukraine) Dmytro Pashytskyy	29 November 1987	2.05 m (6 ft 9 in)	middle blocker
21	(Poland) Wojciech Żaliński	8 January 1988	1.96 m (6 ft 5 in)	outside hitter
22	(United States) Erik Shoji	24 August 1989	1.83 m (6 ft 0 in)	libero
71	(Poland) Korneliusz Banach	25 January 1994	1.84 m (6 ft 0 in)	libero
99	(Poland) Norbert Huber	14 August 1998	2.07 m (6 ft 9 in)	middle blocker
Head coach:		(Finland) Tuomas Sammelvuo		

== See also ==
- 2022–23 PlusLiga
