= Bartłomiej Kluth =

Polish volleyball player (born 1992)

Personal information
- Born: 20 December 1992 (age 33); Orneta, Poland
- Height: 2.09 m (6 ft 10 in)
- Weight: 110 kg (243 lb)
- Spike: 360 cm (142 in)
- Block: 340 cm (134 in)

Volleyball information
- Position: Opposite

Career
Years	Teams
2014–2015; 2015–2016; 2016–2018; 2018–2019; 2019–2020; 2020–2024	Ślepsk Suwałki; UMKS Kęczanin Kęty; Espadon Szczecin; Hapoel Yoav Kfar Saba; Calzedonia Verona; ZAKSA Kędzierzyn-Koźle

Bartłomiej Kluth (born 20 December 1992) is a Polish professional volleyball player who plays as an opposite spiker; a three–time Champions League winner (2021, 2022) and the current PlusLiga record holder in number of scored points in one match (40).

== Honours ==
=== Club ===
- CEV Champions League
  - 2020–21 – with ZAKSA Kędzierzyn-Koźle
  - 2021–22 – with ZAKSA Kędzierzyn-Koźle
  - 2022–23 – with ZAKSA Kędzierzyn-Koźle
- Domestic
  - 2020–21 Polish SuperCup, with ZAKSA Kędzierzyn-Koźle
  - 2020–21 Polish Cup, with ZAKSA Kędzierzyn-Koźle
  - 2021–22 Polish Cup, with ZAKSA Kędzierzyn-Koźle
  - 2021–22 Polish Championship, with ZAKSA Kędzierzyn-Koźle
  - 2022–23 Polish Cup, with ZAKSA Kędzierzyn-Koźle
  - 2023–24 Polish SuperCup, with ZAKSA Kędzierzyn-Koźle
