= Korneliusz Banach =

Polish volleyball player (born 1994)

Personal information
- Born: 25 January 1994 (age 32); Kędzierzyn-Koźle, Poland
- Height: 1.84 m (6 ft 0 in)
- Weight: 69 kg (152 lb)
- Spike: 315 cm (124 in)

Volleyball information
- Position: Libero

Career
Years	Teams
2016–2018; 2018–2019; 2019–2024	ZAKSA Kędzierzyn-Koźle; ZAKSA Strzelce Opolskie; ZAKSA Kędzierzyn-Koźle

Korneliusz Banach (born 25 January 1994) is a Polish professional volleyball player.

== Career ==
In 2015, he joined the first team of ZAKSA Kędzierzyn-Koźle, and made his debut in the PlusLiga.

== Honours ==
=== Club ===
- CEV Champions League
  - 2020–21 – with ZAKSA Kędzierzyn-Koźle
  - 2021–22 – with ZAKSA Kędzierzyn-Koźle
  - 2022–23 – with ZAKSA Kędzierzyn-Koźle
- Domestic
  - 2015–16 Polish Championship, with ZAKSA Kędzierzyn-Koźle
  - 2016–17 Polish Cup, with ZAKSA Kędzierzyn-Koźle
  - 2016–17 Polish Championship, with ZAKSA Kędzierzyn-Koźle
  - 2019–20 Polish SuperCup, with ZAKSA Kędzierzyn-Koźle
  - 2020–21 Polish SuperCup, with ZAKSA Kędzierzyn-Koźle
  - 2020–21 Polish Cup, with ZAKSA Kędzierzyn-Koźle
  - 2021–22 Polish Cup, with ZAKSA Kędzierzyn-Koźle
  - 2021–22 Polish Championship, with ZAKSA Kędzierzyn-Koźle
  - 2022–23 Polish Cup, with ZAKSA Kędzierzyn-Koźle
  - 2023–24 Polish SuperCup, with ZAKSA Kędzierzyn-Koźle
