= 2021–22 Polish Men's Volleyball Cup =

2021–22 Polish Volleyball Cup
- Sport: Volleyball
- Duration: 26–27 February 2022
- Total attendance: 5,943 (1,981 per match)
- TV partner: Polsat Sport

Finals
- Champions: ZAKSA Kędzierzyn-Koźle (9th title)
- Finals MVP: Marcin Janusz (POL)

Seasons
- ← 2020–21 2022–23 →

The 2021–22 Polish Cup was the 65th edition of the Polish Volleyball Cup tournament.

ZAKSA Kędzierzyn-Koźle beat Jastrzębski Węgiel in the final (3–0) and won their ninth Polish Cup.

== Final four ==
- Venue: Hala Orbita, Wrocław
- All times are Central European Time (UTC+01:00).

Semifinals
26 February
ZAKSA Kędzierzyn-Koźle | 3
Trefl Gdańsk | 1
26 February
Jastrzębski Węgiel | 3
Asseco Resovia | 2

Final
27 February
ZAKSA Kędzierzyn-Koźle | 3
Jastrzębski Węgiel | 0

=== Semifinals ===
| Date | Time | | Score | | Set 1 | Set 2 | Set 3 | Set 4 | Set 5 | Total | Report |
|---|---|---|---|---|---|---|---|---|---|---|---|
| 26 Feb | 14:45 | ZAKSA Kędzierzyn-Koźle | 3–1 | Trefl Gdańsk | 25–17 | 25–21 | 23–25 | 25–14 | | 98–77 | Report |
| 26 Feb | 18:00 | Jastrzębski Węgiel | 3–2 | Asseco Resovia | 25–14 | 25–19 | 23–25 | 25–27 | 15–12 | 113–97 | Report |

=== Final ===
| Date | Time | | Score | | Set 1 | Set 2 | Set 3 | Set 4 | Set 5 | Total | Report |
|---|---|---|---|---|---|---|---|---|---|---|---|
| 27 Feb | 14:45 | ZAKSA Kędzierzyn-Koźle | 3–0 | Jastrzębski Węgiel | 25–20 | 25–15 | 25–19 | | | 75–54 | Report |

== Final standings ==
| Qualified for the 2022 Polish SuperCup |

| Rank | Team |
|---|---|
| 1st place, gold medalist(s) | ZAKSA Kędzierzyn-Koźle |
| 2 | Jastrzębski Węgiel |
| Semifinalists | Asseco Resovia; Trefl Gdańsk |

2021–22 Polish Cup winners
ZAKSA Kędzierzyn-Koźle
9th title

== Squads ==
Asseco Resovia
| No. | Name | Date of birth | Height | Position |
|---|---|---|---|---|
| 1 | (Poland) Bartłomiej Krulicki | 15 September 1993 | 2.05 m (6 ft 9 in) | middle blocker |
| 2 | (Poland) Maciej Muzaj | 21 May 1994 | 2.07 m (6 ft 9 in) | opposite |
| 3 | (Belgium) Sam Deroo | 29 April 1992 | 2.03 m (6 ft 8 in) | outside hitter |
| 4 | (Slovenia) Jan Kozamernik | 24 December 1995 | 2.05 m (6 ft 9 in) | middle blocker |
| 5 | (Poland) Jakub Bucki | 13 August 1988 | 1.97 m (6 ft 6 in) | opposite |
| 7 | (Poland) Jakub Kochanowski | 17 July 1997 | 1.99 m (6 ft 6 in) | middle blocker |
| 9 | (Poland) Nicolas Szerszeń | 31 December 1996 | 1.95 m (6 ft 5 in) | outside hitter |
| 11 | (Poland) Fabian Drzyzga | 3 January 1990 | 1.96 m (6 ft 5 in) | setter |
| 12 | (Poland) Paweł Woicki | 19 June 1983 | 1.82 m (6 ft 0 in) | setter |
| 13 | (Poland) Michał Potera | 6 March 1988 | 1.83 m (6 ft 0 in) | libero |
| 14 | (Poland) Rafał Buszek | 28 April 1987 | 1.96 m (6 ft 5 in) | outside hitter |
| 16 | (Poland) Paweł Zatorski | 21 June 1990 | 1.84 m (6 ft 0 in) | libero |
| 18 | (Slovenia) Klemen Čebulj | 21 February 1992 | 2.02 m (6 ft 8 in) | outside hitter |
| 84 | (Estonia) Timo Tammemaa | 18 November 1991 | 2.04 m (6 ft 8 in) | middle blocker |
| Head coach: | | (Argentina) Marcelo Méndez | | |

Jastrzębski Węgiel
| No. | Name | Date of birth | Height | Position |
|---|---|---|---|---|
| 1 | (Poland) Dawid Dryja | 21 July 1992 | 2.01 m (6 ft 7 in) | middle blocker |
| 2 | (Czech Republic) Jan Hadrava | 3 June 1991 | 1.99 m (6 ft 6 in) | opposite |
| 3 | (Poland) Jakub Popiwczak | 17 April 1996 | 1.80 m (5 ft 11 in) | libero |
| 6 | (France) Benjamin Toniutti | 30 October 1989 | 1.83 m (6 ft 0 in) | setter |
| 7 | (Hungary) Árpád Baróti | 23 October 1991 | 2.06 m (6 ft 9 in) | opposite |
| 8 | (France) Stéphen Boyer | 10 April 1996 | 1.96 m (6 ft 5 in) | opposite |
| 9 | (Poland) Łukasz Wiśniewski | 3 February 1989 | 1.98 m (6 ft 6 in) | middle blocker |
| 13 | (Poland) Yuriy Gladyr | 8 July 1984 | 2.02 m (6 ft 8 in) | middle blocker |
| 14 | (Finland) Eemi Tervaportti | 26 July 1989 | 1.93 m (6 ft 4 in) | setter |
| 16 | (Poland) Bartosz Cedzyński | 20 December 1990 | 2.11 m (6 ft 11 in) | middle blocker |
| 17 | (France) Trévor Clévenot | 28 June 1994 | 2.00 m (6 ft 7 in) | outside hitter |
| 20 | (Poland) Wojciech Szwed | 7 March 2000 | 1.98 m (6 ft 6 in) | outside hitter |
| 21 | (Poland) Tomasz Fornal | 31 August 1997 | 2.00 m (6 ft 7 in) | outside hitter |
| 24 | (Poland) Szymon Biniek | 30 July 1995 | 1.88 m (6 ft 2 in) | libero |
| 26 | (Poland) Rafał Szymura | 29 August 1995 | 1.97 m (6 ft 6 in) | outside hitter |
| 95 | (Poland) Jakub Macyra | 22 July 1995 | 2.02 m (6 ft 8 in) | middle blocker |
| Head coach: | | (Italy) Andrea Gardini | | |

Trefl Gdańsk
| No. | Name | Date of birth | Height | Position |
|---|---|---|---|---|
| 1 | (Poland) Bartłomiej Lipiński | 16 November 1996 | 2.01 m (6 ft 7 in) | outside hitter |
| 2 | (Poland) Mariusz Wlazły | 4 August 1983 | 1.94 m (6 ft 4 in) | opposite |
| 4 | (Poland) Łukasz Kozub | 3 November 1997 | 1.86 m (6 ft 1 in) | setter |
| 7 | (Poland) Dawid Pruszkowski | 20 January 2001 | 1.75 m (5 ft 9 in) | libero |
| 9 | (Poland) Kewin Sasak | 20 February 1997 | 2.08 m (6 ft 10 in) | opposite |
| 10 | (Germany) Moritz Reichert | 15 March 1995 | 1.95 m (6 ft 5 in) | outside hitter |
| 11 | (Germany) Lukas Kampa | 29 November 1986 | 1.93 m (6 ft 4 in) | setter |
| 12 | (Poland) Karol Urbanowicz | 24 February 2001 | 2.00 m (6 ft 7 in) | middle blocker |
| 14 | (Poland) Maciej Olenderek | 16 October 1992 | 1.78 m (5 ft 10 in) | libero |
| 15 | (Poland) Mateusz Mika | 21 January 1991 | 2.06 m (6 ft 9 in) | outside hitter |
| 17 | (Poland) Bartłomiej Mordyl | 21 January 1995 | 2.01 m (6 ft 7 in) | middle blocker |
| 18 | (Argentina) Pablo Crer | 12 June 1989 | 2.05 m (6 ft 9 in) | middle blocker |
| 23 | (Poland) Jordan Zaleszczyk | 23 April 2002 | 2.03 m (6 ft 8 in) | middle blocker |
| 99 | (Poland) Patryk Łaba | 30 July 1991 | 1.88 m (6 ft 2 in) | outside hitter |
| Head coach: | | (Poland) Michał Winiarski | | |

ZAKSA Kędzierzyn-Koźle
| No. | Name | Date of birth | Height | Position |
|---|---|---|---|---|
| 2 | (Poland) Łukasz Kaczmarek | 29 June 1994 | 2.04 m (6 ft 8 in) | opposite |
| 4 | (Poland) Krzysztof Rejno | 22 February 1993 | 2.03 m (6 ft 8 in) | middle blocker |
| 5 | (Poland) Marcin Janusz | 31 July 1994 | 1.91 m (6 ft 3 in) | setter |
| 8 | (Poland) Adrian Staszewski | 31 May 1990 | 1.98 m (6 ft 6 in) | outside hitter |
| 9 | (Poland) Bartłomiej Kluth | 20 December 1992 | 2.10 m (6 ft 11 in) | opposite |
| 11 | (Poland) Aleksander Śliwka | 24 May 1995 | 1.97 m (6 ft 6 in) | outside hitter |
| 13 | (Poland) Kamil Semeniuk | 16 July 1996 | 1.94 m (6 ft 4 in) | outside hitter |
| 15 | (United States) David Smith | 15 May 1985 | 2.01 m (6 ft 7 in) | middle blocker |
| 16 | (Poland) Tomasz Kalembka | 30 June 1991 | 2.05 m (6 ft 9 in) | middle blocker |
| 18 | (Poland) Michał Kozłowski | 16 February 1985 | 1.91 m (6 ft 3 in) | setter |
| 21 | (Poland) Wojciech Żaliński | 8 January 1988 | 1.96 m (6 ft 5 in) | outside hitter |
| 22 | (United States) Erik Shoji | 24 August 1989 | 1.83 m (6 ft 0 in) | libero |
| 71 | (Poland) Korneliusz Banach | 25 January 1994 | 1.84 m (6 ft 0 in) | libero |
| 99 | (Poland) Norbert Huber | 14 August 1998 | 2.07 m (6 ft 9 in) | middle blocker |
| Head coach: | | (Romania) Gheorghe Crețu | | |

== See also ==
- 2021–22 PlusLiga
