= Adrian Staszewski =

Polish volleyball player (born 1990)

Personal information
- Born: 31 May 1990 (age 36); Kielce, Poland
- Height: 1.96 m (6 ft 5 in)

Volleyball information
- Position: Outside hitter

Career
| Years | Teams |
|---|---|
| 2012–2015; 2015–2020; 2020–2023; 2023–2025; 2025–2026 | Effector Kielce; Lindemans Aalst; ZAKSA Kędzierzyn-Koźle; Asseco Resovia; Jastrzębski Węgiel |

Adrian Staszewski (born 31 May 1990) is a Polish former professional volleyball player.

== Honours ==
=== Club ===
- CEV Champions League
  - 2020–21 – with ZAKSA Kędzierzyn-Koźle
  - 2021–22 – with ZAKSA Kędzierzyn-Koźle
  - 2022–23 – with ZAKSA Kędzierzyn-Koźle
- CEV Cup
  - 2023–24 – with Asseco Resovia
  - 2024–25 – with Asseco Resovia
- Domestic
  - 2015–16 Belgian SuperCup, with Lindemans Aalst
  - 2020–21 Polish SuperCup, with ZAKSA Kędzierzyn-Koźle
  - 2020–21 Polish Cup, with ZAKSA Kędzierzyn-Koźle
  - 2021–22 Polish Cup, with ZAKSA Kędzierzyn-Koźle
  - 2021–22 Polish Championship, with ZAKSA Kędzierzyn-Koźle
  - 2022–23 Polish Cup, with ZAKSA Kędzierzyn-Koźle
