= Kobe Shoji =

Japanese-American veteran and agriculturist (1920–2004)

- Born: July 27, 1920; Upland, California, U.S.
- Died: November 13, 2004 (aged 84); Honolulu, Hawaii, U.S.
- Education: Pomona College (BA); University of California, Los Angeles (PhD)
- Occupation: Agriculturist
- Employers: C. Brewer; Alexander & Baldwin
- Known for: Sugar cane expertise
- Spouse: Chizuko "Chiz" Fujiwara (m. 1943)
- Children: 3, including Dave
- Military career
- Branch: U.S. Army
- Service years: 1943–1945
- Rank: First Sergeant
- Unit: 442nd Infantry Regiment
- Awards: Purple Heart (2); Nisei Soldiers of World War II Congressional Gold Medal

Kobe Shoji (July 27, 1920 – November 13, 2004) was an American executive in the sugar cane industry, veteran of the 442nd Infantry Regiment, and athlete.

== Early life ==
Shoji was born in Upland, California; his father, a Japanese immigrant, owned a lemon farm. He enrolled at Chaffey Junior College before transferring to Pomona College. He was active in athletics as a single-wing tailback and a long jumper for the Pomona-Pitzer Sagehens.

== Internment and military service ==
In his junior year, in response to Executive Order 9066, the college's president E. Wilson Lyon arranged for him and the college's other Japanese-American students to temporarily transfer to Oberlin College, but he instead elected to go into internment with his family. He was relocated to the Poston War Relocation Center in Arizona, where he met his wife Chiz and endured heat of 120 °F (49 °C) in the shade. The next year, he chose to enlist in the 442nd Infantry Regiment, a fighting unit composed almost entirely of second-generation Japanese-Americans which became the most decorated in U.S. military history. After completing basic training, he married Chiz at Poston in 1943 and was sent to Europe. He fought in southern France and Italy, attained the rank of First Sergeant, and was awarded two Purple Hearts for his service.

== Agricultural career ==
After returning from Europe, he completed his studies at Pomona in 1947. In his final collegiate football game, his two front teeth were knocked out.

Shoji completed his doctorate in plant physiology at the University of California, Los Angeles, in 1950. That year, he moved with his family to Honolulu, Hawaii, to teach at the University of Hawaiʻi's College of Tropical Agriculture.

In 1960, he became the vice president and chief agriculturist for C. Brewer & Co. He spent four years travelling in Iran and Puerto Rico to assist them in developing their sugar cane industry. In 1975, he moved to Alexander & Baldwin.

== Retirement, death, and legacy ==
Shoji retired in the late 1980s. He spent time with his sons playing golf, and was an active supporter of the Hawaii Rainbow Warriors and Rainbow Wahine. His son Dave became the team's women's volleyball coach. His grandsons, Dave’s sons Erik and Kawika, became professional volleyball players, appearing for the US national team.

Shoji had lung cancer and died at The Queen's Medical Center on November 13, 2004, of complications of pneumonia, while watching Dave coach a game.

In 2010, his regiment was awarded the Nisei Soldiers of World War II Congressional Gold Medal. Senator Mazie Hirono (D‑HI), speaking in support of it, used him as an example of the regiment's valor.
