= David Smith (volleyball) =

American volleyball player (born 1985)

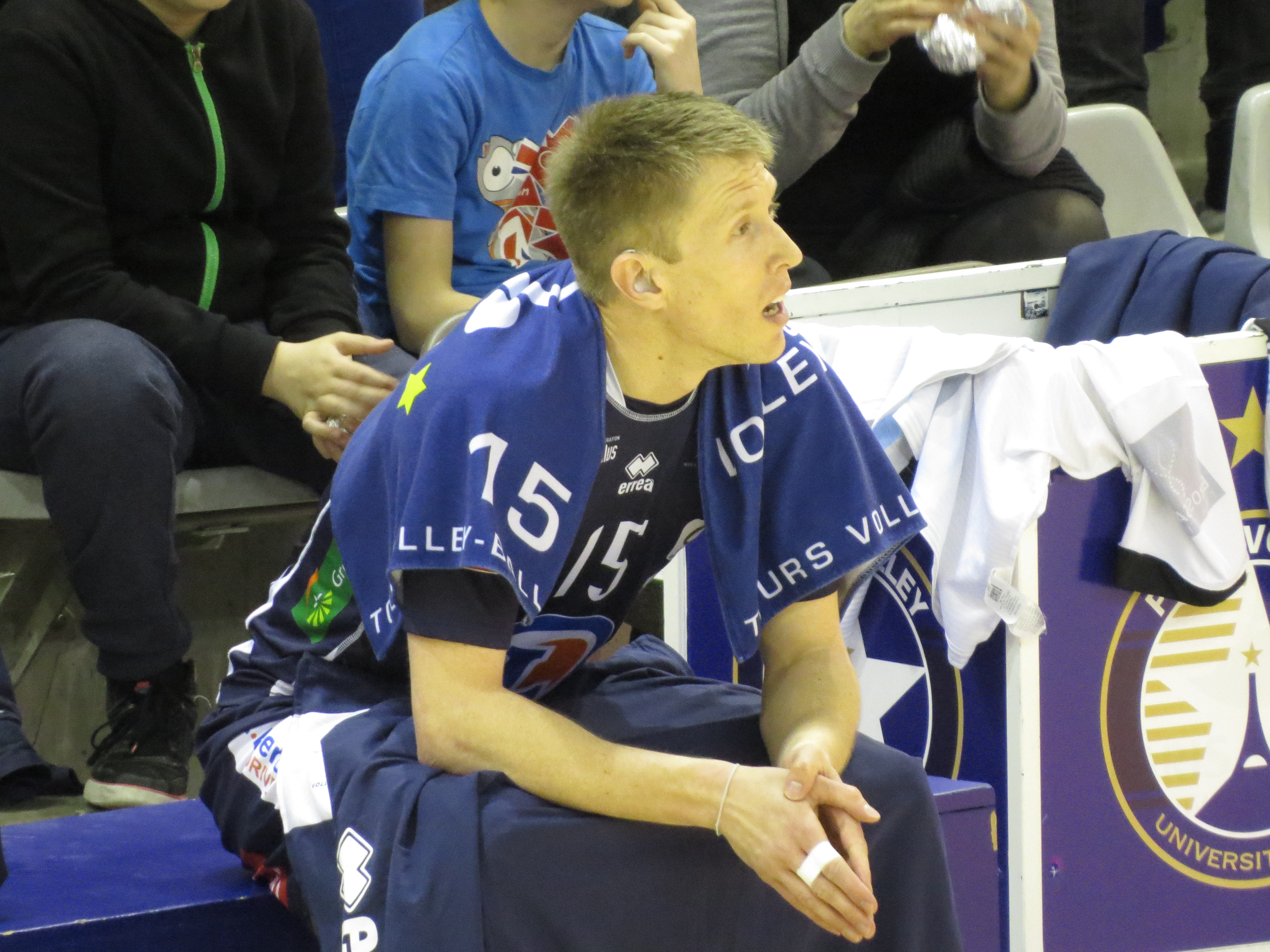
- Smith in 2016

Personal information
- Born: May 15, 1985 (age 41) Panorama City, Los Angeles, U.S.
- Education: UC Irvine
- Height: 6 ft 8 in (2.03 m)
- Weight: 190 lb (86 kg)
- Spike: 140 in (360 cm)
- Block: 136 in (345 cm)

Volleyball information
- Position: Middle blocker

Career
- Years: Team
- 2004–2007 2007 2008–2009 2009–2010 2010–2011 2011–2016 2016–2017 2017–2018 2018–2019 2019–2025 2025–2026: UC Irvine Anteaters; Ulster University; TV Rottenburg; Caribes de San Sebastián; CV Almería; Tours VB; Czarni Radom; Warta Zawiercie; Asseco Resovia; ZAKSA Kędzierzyn-Koźle; Ślepsk Suwałki

National team
- Years: Team
- 2009–: United States
Medal record
Men's volleyball
Representing United States
Olympic Games
Bronze medal – third place	2016 Rio de Janeiro	Team
Bronze medal – third place	2024 Paris	Team
FIVB World Championship
Bronze medal – third place	2018 Bulgaria/Italy
FIVB World Cup
Gold medal – first place	2015 Japan
Gold medal – first place	2023 Japan
Bronze medal – third place	2019 Japan
FIVB World League
Silver medal – second place	2012 Sofia
Bronze medal – third place	2015 Rio de Janeiro
FIVB Nations League
Silver medal – second place	2019 Chicago
Silver medal – second place	2022 Bologna
Silver medal – second place	2023 Gdańsk
Bronze medal – third place	2018 Lille
NORCECA Championship
Gold medal – first place	2017 Colorado Springs
Gold medal – first place	2023 Charleston

David Smith (born May 15, 1985) is an American professional volleyball player who plays as a middle blocker for the U.S. national team. Smith was a bronze medalist at the Olympic Games Rio 2016, Paris 2024 and the 2018 World Championship; the 2015 World Cup winner and a three–time Champions League winner (2021, 2022, 2023) with ZAKSA.

== Personal life ==
Smith was born in the Los Angeles district of Panorama City on May 15, 1985. Born nearly deaf, he wears hearing aids and reads lips to understand his teammates. He grew up in Santa Clarita, where he attended Saugus High School.

Smith is 6 feet, 7 inches (200 cm) tall. He married his wife Kelli in 2008. They have two children, a son Cohen and a daughter Amelie.

== Career ==
=== College ===
Smith played for the UC Irvine volleyball team from 2004 to 2007. In 2004, his .369 hitting percentage was the highest on the team. He also had a 1.03 blocking average and 102 block assists. The following season, he had a .401 hitting percentage and a 0.86 blocking average. Smith then had a .412 hitting percentage, 1.27 blocking average, 129 block assists, and 143 total blocks in 2006.

In 2007, Smith helped University of California Irvine win the NCAA National Champions title. His .559 hitting percentage led the nation and was a new school record. He also broke the UCI single-season block assists record, with 160. Smith was named to the All-American first team and the NCAA All-Tournament team. He finished his UCI career as the school's all-time leader in block assists (471) and total blocks (520).

=== National team ===
Smith joined the U.S. national team in 2009. That year, he was named the Best Blocker at the World Championship Qualifier and played in the FIVB World League. In 2010, he helped the U.S. win the Pan American Cup.

Smith tied as the team's second-leading scorer at the 2011 Pan American Cup, as the U.S. finished second. He then played in the 2012 FIVB World League, where the U.S. finished second. At the 2012 Summer Olympics, he was a substitute and had eight points.

== Honors ==
=== Club ===
- CEV Champions League
  - 2020–21 – with ZAKSA Kędzierzyn-Koźle
  - 2021–22 – with ZAKSA Kędzierzyn-Koźle
  - 2022–23 – with ZAKSA Kędzierzyn-Koźle
- Domestic
  - 2010–11 Spanish SuperCup, with CV Almería
  - 2010–11 Spanish Championship, with CV Almería
  - 2011–12 French SuperCup, with Tours VB
  - 2011–12 French Championship, with Tours VB
  - 2012–13 French Cup, with Tours VB
  - 2012–13 French Championship, with Tours VB
  - 2013–14 French SuperCup, with Tours VB
  - 2013–14 French Cup, with Tours VB
  - 2013–14 French Championship, with Tours VB
  - 2014–15 French SuperCup, with Tours VB
  - 2014–15 French Cup, with Tours VB
  - 2014–15 French Championship, with Tours VB
  - 2019–20 Polish SuperCup, with ZAKSA Kędzierzyn-Koźle
  - 2020–21 Polish SuperCup, with ZAKSA Kędzierzyn-Koźle
  - 2020–21 Polish Cup, with ZAKSA Kędzierzyn-Koźle
  - 2021–22 Polish Cup, with ZAKSA Kędzierzyn-Koźle
  - 2021–22 Polish Championship, with ZAKSA Kędzierzyn-Koźle
  - 2022–23 Polish Cup, with ZAKSA Kędzierzyn-Koźle
  - 2023–24 Polish SuperCup, with ZAKSA Kędzierzyn-Koźle

=== Youth national team ===
- 2004 NORCECA U21 Championship

=== Individual awards ===
- 2012: French Championship – Best middle blocker
- 2015: French Championship – Best middle blocker
- 2016: French Championship – Best middle blocker
- 2022: FIVB Nations League – Best middle blocker
- 2023: CEV Champions League – Most valuable player
- 2023: FIVB Nations League – Best middle blocker

Awards
Preceded by (Brazil) Maurício Souza (Poland) Mateusz Bieniek	Best Middle Blocker of FIVB Nations League; 2022 ex aequo (Poland) Mateusz Bieniek; 2023 ex aequo (Poland) Jakub Kochanowski	Succeeded by (France) Nicolas Le Goff (Poland) Jakub Kochanowski
