= Marcin Janusz =

Polish volleyball player (born 1994)

- Janusz in 2019

Personal information
- Born: 31 July 1994 (age 32); Nowy Sącz, Poland
- Height: 1.95 m (6 ft 5 in)
- Weight: 92 kg (203 lb)
- Spike: 345 cm (136 in)
- Block: 325 cm (128 in)

Volleyball information
- Position: Setter
- Current club: Asseco Resovia
- Number: 19

Career
Years	Teams
2011–2012; 2012–2014; 2014–2015; 2015–2018; 2018–2021; 2021–2025; 2025–	Skra Bełchatów; AZS Częstochowa; Effector Kielce; Skra Bełchatów; Trefl Gdańsk; ZAKSA Kędzierzyn-Koźle; Asseco Resovia

National team
2019–2024	Poland
Honours
Men's volleyball
Representing Poland
Olympic Games
Silver medal – second place	2024 Paris	Team
FIVB World Championship
Silver medal – second place	2022 Poland/Slovenia
FIVB Nations League
Gold medal – first place	2023 Gdańsk
Bronze medal – third place	2019 Chicago
Bronze medal – third place	2022 Bologna
Bronze medal – third place	2024 Łódź
CEV European Championship
Gold medal – first place	2023 Italy/Bulgaria/North Macedonia/Israel

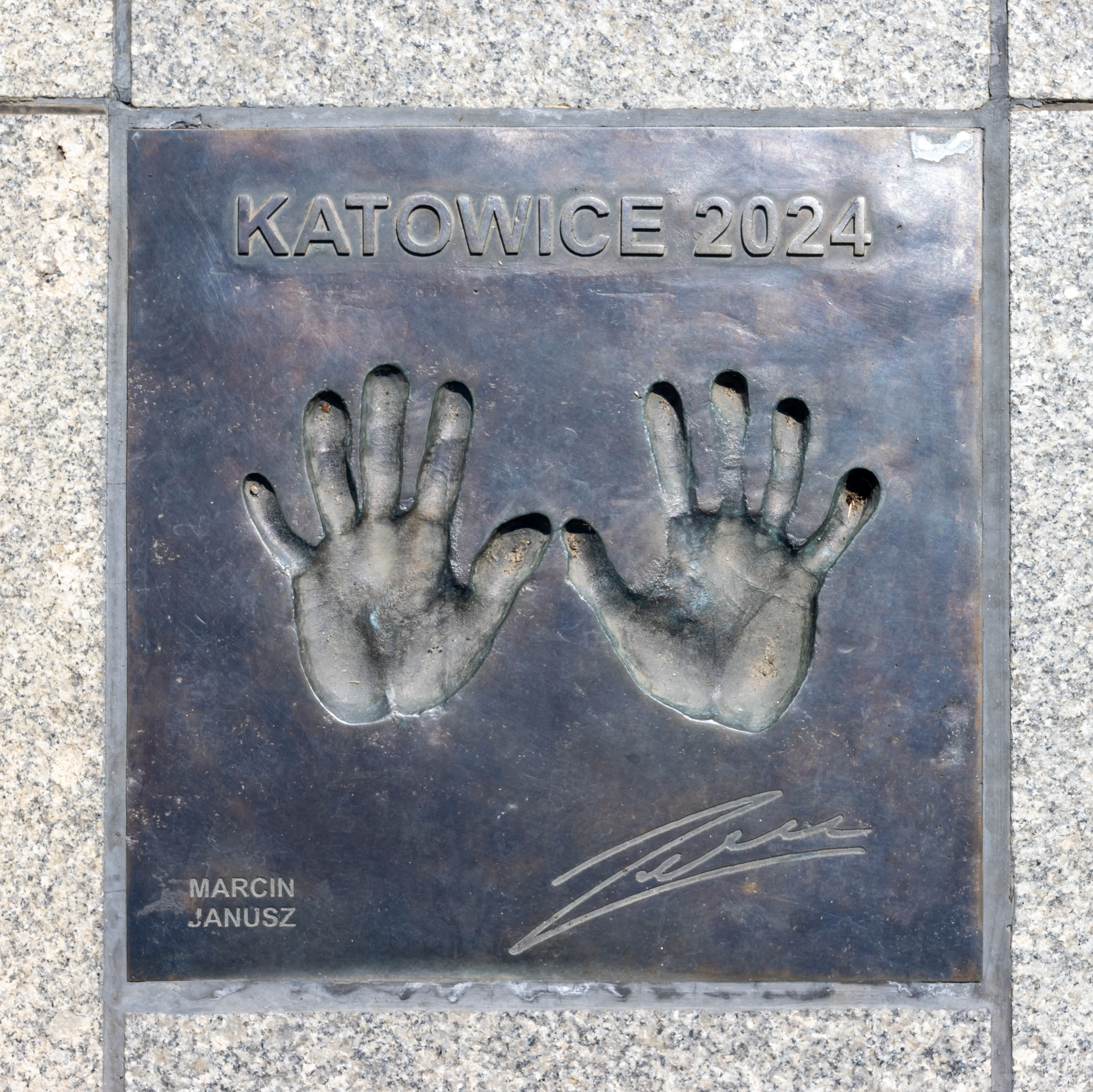
Hand prints and signature at the Avenue of Volleyball Stars, Katowice

Marcin Janusz (born 31 July 1994) is a Polish professional volleyball player who plays as a setter for Asseco Resovia, which he captains. Janusz is a former member of the Poland national team, a silver medallist of the 2024 Summer Olympics and the 2022 World Championship, as well as a two–time Champions League winner (2022, 2023) with ZAKSA.

== Career ==
=== Club ===
In 2015, Janusz came back to Skra Bełchatów. On 7 February 2016, alongside PGE Skra, he won the Polish Cup after beating ZAKSA in the final. In April 2016, he was a member of the same team which won a bronze medal in the 2015–16 PlusLiga season.

=== National team ===
On 10 August 2024, he won a silver medal at the 2024 Summer Olympic Games held in Paris.

== Honours ==
=== Club ===
- CEV Champions League
  - 2021–22 – with ZAKSA Kędzierzyn-Koźle
  - 2022–23 – with ZAKSA Kędzierzyn-Koźle
- Domestic
  - 2015–16 Polish Cup, with PGE Skra Bełchatów
  - 2017–18 Polish SuperCup, with PGE Skra Bełchatów
  - 2017–18 Polish Championship, with PGE Skra Bełchatów
  - 2021–22 Polish Cup, with ZAKSA Kędzierzyn-Koźle
  - 2021–22 Polish Championship, with ZAKSA Kędzierzyn-Koźle
  - 2022–23 Polish Cup, with ZAKSA Kędzierzyn-Koźle
  - 2023–24 Polish SuperCup, with ZAKSA Kędzierzyn-Koźle

=== Individual awards ===
- 2018: Polish Cup – Best setter
- 2022: Polish Cup – Most valuable player

=== State awards ===
- 2024: Knight's Cross of Polonia Restituta
