= Wojciech Żaliński =

Polish volleyball player

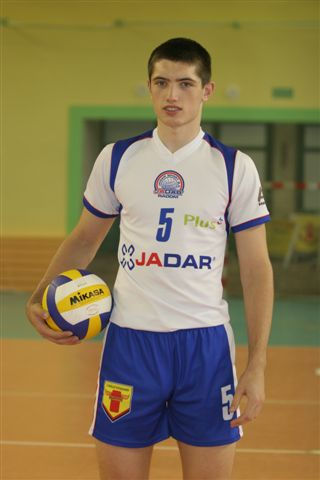

Personal information
- Born: 8 January 1988 (age 38) Skarżysko-Kamienna, Poland
- Height: 1.96 m (6 ft 5 in)
- Weight: 92 kg (203 lb)
- Spike: 345 cm (136 in)

Volleyball information
- Position: Outside hitter

Career
- Years: Team
- 2005–2010 2010–2012 2012–2014 2014–2019 2019–2021 2021–2024: Jadar Radom; AZS Politechnika Warszawska; Trefl Gdańsk; Czarni Radom; AZS Olsztyn; ZAKSA Kędzierzyn-Koźle

Wojciech Żaliński (born 8 January 1988) is a Polish former professional volleyball player.

== Personal life ==
His sister, Katarzyna Brojek (born 1986) is also a volleyball player. He is married to Diana. On 19 May 2012, their son Franciszek was born. On 11 June 2017, his wife gave birth to their second child, a daughter named Aleksandra.

== Honours ==
=== Club ===
- CEV Champions League
  - 2021–22 – with ZAKSA Kędzierzyn-Koźle
  - 2022–23 – with ZAKSA Kędzierzyn-Koźle
- CEV Challenge Cup
  - 2011–12 – with AZS Politechnika Warszawska
- Domestic
  - 2021–22 Polish Cup, with ZAKSA Kędzierzyn-Koźle
  - 2021–22 Polish Championship, with ZAKSA Kędzierzyn-Koźle
  - 2022–23 Polish Cup, with ZAKSA Kędzierzyn-Koźle
  - 2023–24 Polish SuperCup, with ZAKSA Kędzierzyn-Koźle

=== Universiade ===
- 2013 Summer Universiade

=== Statistics ===
- 2018–19 PlusLiga – Best server (56 aces)
