= Krzysztof Rejno =

Polish volleyball player (born 1993)

Personal information
- Nickname: Pepe
- Born: 22 February 1993 (age 33); Wrocław, Poland
- Height: 2.03 m (6 ft 8 in)
- Weight: 88 kg (194 lb)
- Spike: 355 cm (140 in)
- Block: 330 cm (130 in)

Volleyball information
- Position: Middle blocker

Career
Years	Teams
2012–2013; 2013–2014; 2014–2016; 2016–2017; 2017–2018; 2018–2019; 2019–2022; 2022–2023; 2023–2025; 2025–2026	Delecta Bydgoszcz; Stal Nysa; ZAKSA Kędzierzyn-Koźle; MKS Będzin; ZAKSA Kędzierzyn-Koźle; Warta Zawiercie; ZAKSA Kędzierzyn-Koźle; Warta Zawiercie; Asseco Resovia; Stilon Gorzów

Krzysztof Rejno (born 22 February 1993) is a Polish professional volleyball player.

== Career ==
In 2014, Rejno joined the team of ZAKSA Kędzierzyn-Koźle. In April 2015, the club decided to extend their contract with Rejno for the next 2 years.

== Honours ==
=== Club ===
- CEV Champions League
  - 2020–21 – with ZAKSA Kędzierzyn-Koźle
  - 2021–22 – with ZAKSA Kędzierzyn-Koźle
- CEV Cup
  - 2023–24 – with Asseco Resovia
  - 2024–25 – with Asseco Resovia
- Domestic
  - 2015–16 Polish Championship, with ZAKSA Kędzierzyn-Koźle
  - 2019–20 Polish SuperCup, with ZAKSA Kędzierzyn-Koźle
  - 2020–21 Polish SuperCup, with ZAKSA Kędzierzyn-Koźle
  - 2020–21 Polish Cup, with ZAKSA Kędzierzyn-Koźle
  - 2021–22 Polish Cup, with ZAKSA Kędzierzyn-Koźle
  - 2021–22 Polish Championship, with ZAKSA Kędzierzyn-Koźle
