= Aleksander Śliwka =

Polish volleyball player (born 1995)

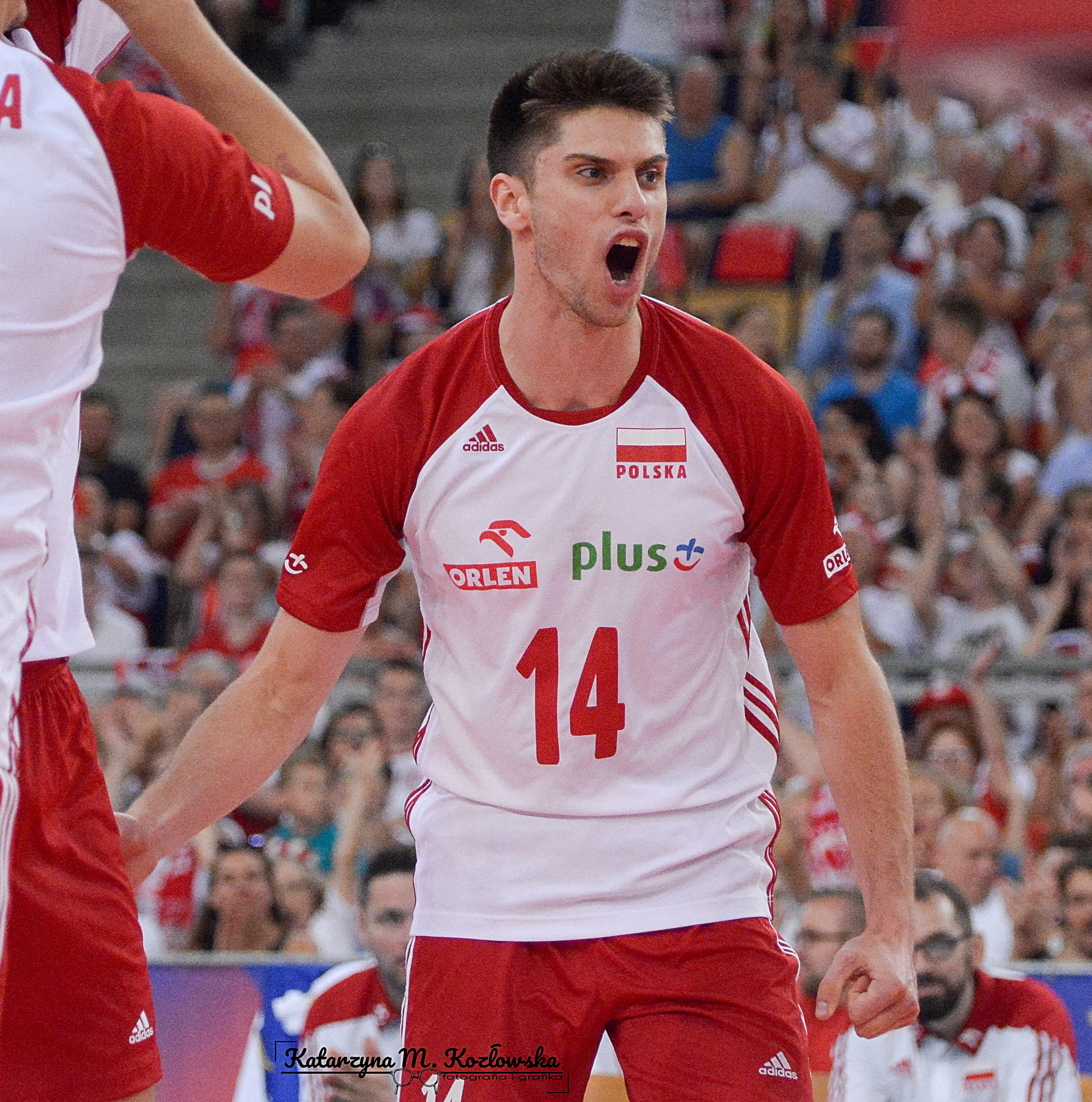
- Śliwka in 2018

Personal information
- Born: 24 May 1995 (age 31); Jawor, Poland
- Height: 1.96 m (6 ft 5 in)
- Weight: 83 kg (183 lb)
- Spike: 342 cm (135 in)
- Block: 325 cm (128 in)

Volleyball information
- Position: Outside hitter
- Current club: Projekt Warsaw
- Number: 11

Career
Years	Teams
2014–2015; 2015–2016; 2016–2017; 2017–2018; 2018–2024; 2024–2025; 2025–2026; 2026–	AZS Politechnika Warszawska; Asseco Resovia; AZS Olsztyn; Asseco Resovia; ZAKSA Kędzierzyn-Koźle; Suntory Sunbirds; Halkbank Ankara; Projekt Warsaw

National team
2015–	Poland
Honours
Men's volleyball
Representing Poland
Olympic Games
Silver medal – second place	2024 Paris	Team
FIVB World Championship
Gold medal – first place	2018 Bulgaria/Italy
Silver medal – second place	2022 Poland/Slovenia
FIVB World Cup
Silver medal – second place	2019 Japan
FIVB Nations League
Gold medal – first place	2023 Gdańsk
Gold medal – first place	2026 Ningbo
Silver medal – second place	2021 Rimini
Bronze medal – third place	2022 Bologna
Bronze medal – third place	2024 Łódź
CEV European Championship
Gold medal – first place	2023 Italy/Bulgaria/North Macedonia/Israel
Gold medal – first place	2026 Bulgaria/Finland/Italy/Romania
Bronze medal – third place	2019 Belgium/France/Netherlands/Slovenia
Bronze medal – third place	2021 Poland/Czechia/Estonia/Finland
European League
Bronze medal – third place	2015 Poland

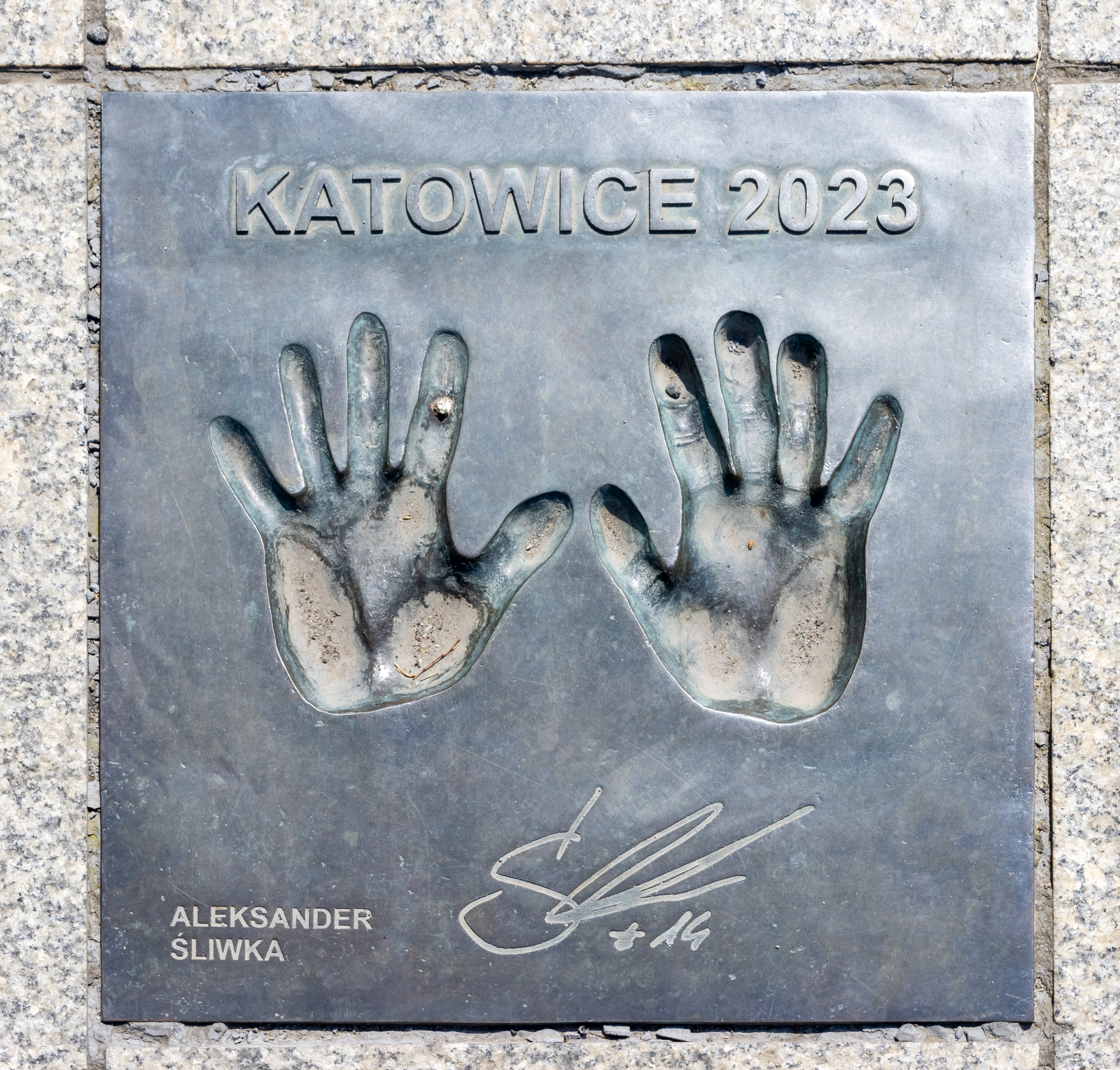
Hand prints and signature at the Avenue of Volleyball Stars, Katowice

Aleksander Śliwka (born 24 May 1995) is a Polish professional volleyball player who plays as an outside hitter for Projekt Warsaw and the Poland national team. He won the silver medal in the Olympic Games Paris 2024. He is also the 2018 World Champion, and a three–time Champions League winner (2021, 2022, 2023) with ZAKSA.

== Career ==
=== Club ===
During the 2017–18 PlusLiga season, he was one of the main players of Asseco Resovia. In May 2018, he moved to ZAKSA Kędzierzyn-Koźle.

=== National team ===
In 2015, he was called up to the national team by the head coach Stéphane Antiga. After the training camp in Spała, he joined the team led by coach Andrzej Kowal which took part in the 2015 European Games.

On 30 September 2018, Poland achieved its 3rd title of the World Champion. Poland beat Brazil in the final and defended the title from 2014.

On 10 August 2024, he won the silver medal at the 2024 Summer Olympic Games in Paris.

== Honours ==
=== Club ===
- CEV Champions League
  - 2020–21 – with ZAKSA Kędzierzyn-Koźle
  - 2021–22 – with ZAKSA Kędzierzyn-Koźle
  - 2022–23 – with ZAKSA Kędzierzyn-Koźle
- AVC Champions League
  - Japan 2025 – with Suntory Sunbirds
- Domestic
  - 2018–19 Polish Cup, with ZAKSA Kędzierzyn-Koźle
  - 2018–19 Polish Championship, with ZAKSA Kędzierzyn-Koźle
  - 2019–20 Polish SuperCup, with ZAKSA Kędzierzyn-Koźle
  - 2020–21 Polish SuperCup, with ZAKSA Kędzierzyn-Koźle
  - 2020–21 Polish Cup, with ZAKSA Kędzierzyn-Koźle
  - 2021–22 Polish Cup, with ZAKSA Kędzierzyn-Koźle
  - 2021–22 Polish Championship, with ZAKSA Kędzierzyn-Koźle
  - 2022–23 Polish Cup, with ZAKSA Kędzierzyn-Koźle
  - 2023–24 Polish SuperCup, with ZAKSA Kędzierzyn-Koźle
  - 2024–25 Emperor's Cup, with Suntory Sunbirds
  - 2024–25 Japanese Championship, with Suntory Sunbirds

=== Youth national team ===
- 2013 CEV U19 European Championship
- 2013 European Youth Olympic Festival
- 2014 CEV U20 European Championship

=== Individual awards ===
- 2019: Polish Cup – Most valuable player
- 2020: Polish SuperCup – Most valuable player
- 2021: CEV Champions League – Most valuable player
- 2023: Polish Cup – Most valuable player
- 2023: FIVB Nations League – Best outside spiker

=== State awards ===
- 2018: Gold Cross of Merit
