= Norbert Huber (volleyball) =

Polish volleyball player (born 1998)

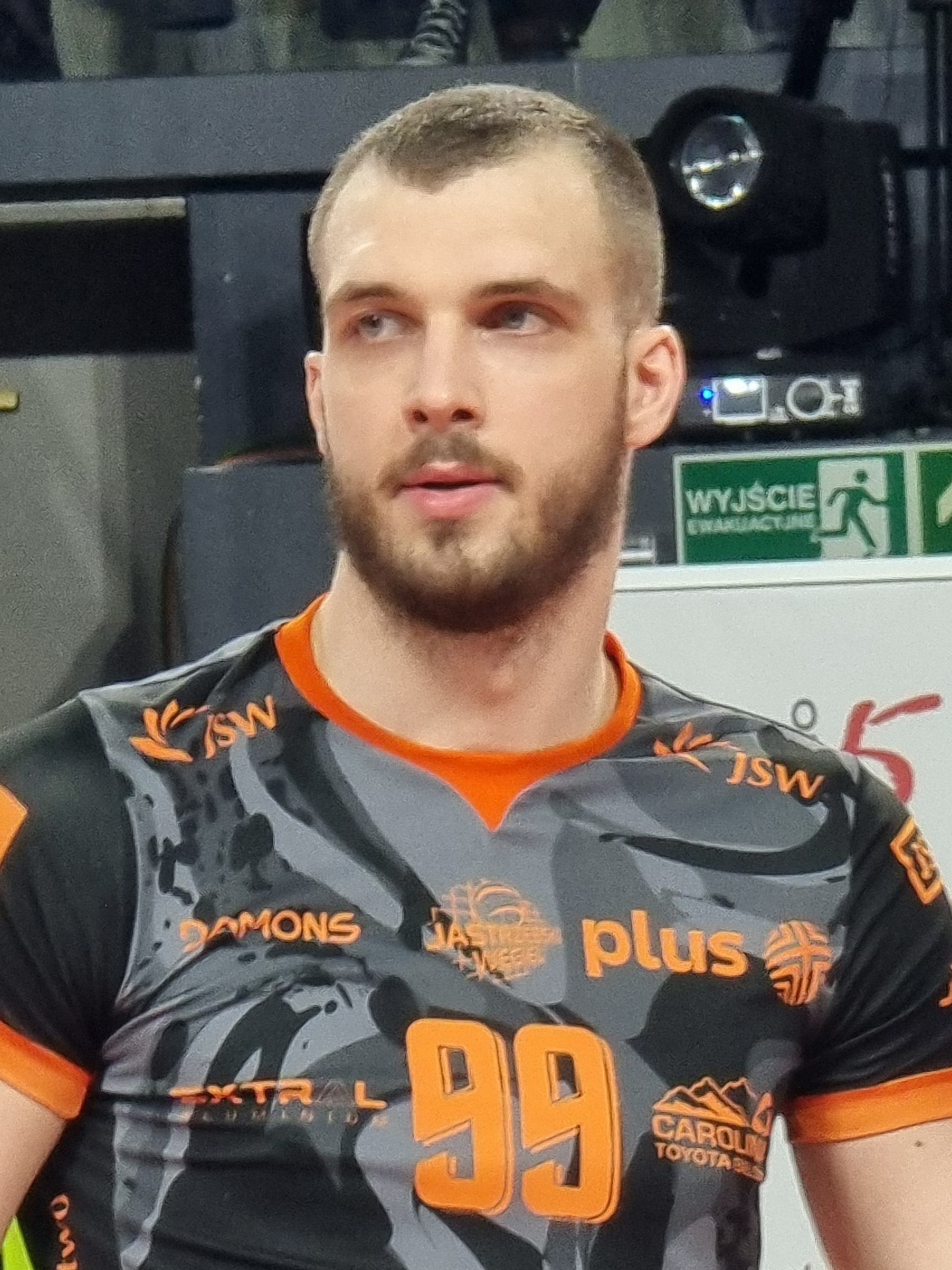
- Huber in 2024

Personal information
- Born: 14 August 1998 (age 28); Brzozów, Poland
- Height: 2.07 m (6 ft 9 in)
- Weight: 97 kg (214 lb)
- Spike: 352 cm (139 in)
- Block: 337 cm (133 in)

Volleyball information
- Position: Middle blocker
- Current club: Wolfdogs Nagoya
- Number: 99

Career
| Years | Teams |
|---|---|
| 2017–2019; 2019–2021; 2021–2023; 2023–2025; 2025– | Czarni Radom; Skra Bełchatów; ZAKSA Kędzierzyn-Koźle; Jastrzębski Węgiel; Wolfdogs Nagoya |

National team
| Poland |
Honours
Men's volleyball
Representing Poland
Olympic Games
| Silver medal – second place | 2024 Paris | Team |
FIVB World Championship
| Bronze medal – third place | 2025 Philippines |
FIVB Nations League
| Gold medal – first place | 2023 Gdańsk |
| Silver medal – second place | 2021 Rimini |
| Bronze medal – third place | 2019 Chicago |
| Bronze medal – third place | 2024 Łódź |
CEV European Championship
| Gold medal – first place | 2023 Italy/Bulgaria/North Macedonia/Israel |

Norbert Huber (born 14 August 1998) is a Polish professional volleyball player who plays as a middle blocker for Wolfdogs Nagoya and the Poland national team.

== Career ==
=== Club ===
In 2017, he signed a contract with Cerrad Czarni Radom and made his debut in the Polish PlusLiga.

=== National team ===
On 10 September 2016, Huber and his national team won the U20 European Champions title after winning 7 out of 7 matches in the tournament, and beating Ukraine in the final. On 2 July 2017, Poland, including Huber, won the U21 World Champions title after beating Cuba in the final (3–0). His national team won 47 matches in a row and never lost.

On 10 August 2024, he won a silver medal at the 2024 Summer Olympic Games held in Paris.

== Honours ==
=== Club ===
- CEV Champions League
  - 2021–22 – with ZAKSA Kędzierzyn-Koźle
  - 2022–23 – with ZAKSA Kędzierzyn-Koźle
  - 2023–24 – with Jastrzębski Węgiel
- Domestic
  - 2021–22 Polish Cup, with ZAKSA Kędzierzyn-Koźle
  - 2021–22 Polish Championship, with ZAKSA Kędzierzyn-Koźle
  - 2022–23 Polish Cup, with ZAKSA Kędzierzyn-Koźle
  - 2023–24 Polish Championship, with Jastrzębski Węgiel
  - 2024–25 Polish Cup, with Jastrzębski Węgiel

=== Youth national team ===
- 2016 CEV U20 European Championship
- 2017 FIVB U21 World Championship

=== State awards ===
- 2024: Knight's Cross of Polonia Restituta
