= Erik Shoji =

American volleyball player (born 1989)

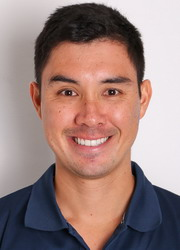
- Shoji in 2018

Personal information
- Full name: Erik Thomas Shoji
- Born: August 24, 1989 (age 37); Honolulu, Hawaii, U.S.
- Height: 6 ft 0 in (1.84 m)
- Weight: 165 lb (75 kg)
- Education: Stanford University

Volleyball information
- Position: Libero
- Current club: Berlin Recycling Volleys
- Number: 22

Career
Years	Teams
2009–2012; 2012–2013; 2013–2014; 2014–2016; 2016–2017; 2017–2018; 2018–2021; 2021–2025; 2025–2026; 2026–	Stanford Cardinal; CV Mitteldeutschland; Hypo Tirol Innsbruck; Berlin Recycling Volleys; Lokomotiv Novosibirsk; Taiwan Excellence Latina; Fakel Novy Urengoy; ZAKSA Kędzierzyn-Koźle; Asseco Resovia; Berlin Recycling Volleys

National team
2013–	United States
Medal record
Men's volleyball
Representing United States
Olympic Games
Bronze medal – third place	2016 Rio de Janeiro	Team
Bronze medal – third place	2024 Paris	Team
FIVB World Championship
Bronze medal – third place	2018 Italy/Bulgaria
FIVB World Cup
Gold medal – first place	2015 Japan
Gold medal – first place	2023 Japan
Bronze medal – third place	2019 Japan
FIVB World League
Gold medal – first place	2014 Florence
Bronze medal – third place	2015 Rio de Janeiro
FIVB Nations League
Silver medal – second place	2019 Chicago
Silver medal – second place	2022 Bologna
Silver medal – second place	2023 Gdańsk
Silver medal – second place	2026 Ningbo
Bronze medal – third place	2018 Lille
NORCECA Championship
Gold medal – first place	2013 Langley
Gold medal – first place	2017 Colorado Springs
Gold medal – first place	2023 Charleston

Erik Thomas Shoji (/ˈʃoʊdʒi/ SHOH-jee; born August 24, 1989) is an American professional volleyball player who plays as a libero for Berlin Recycling Volleys and the U.S. national team. Shoji was a bronze medalist at the Olympic Games Rio 2016, Paris 2024 and the 2018 World Championship; the 2014 World League and 2015 World Cup winner, and a two–time Champions League winner (2022, 2023) with ZAKSA.

== Early life ==
Shoji was born in Honolulu, Hawaii to Dave, a volleyball coach best known for coaching women's volleyball at the University of Hawaii, and Mary Shoji. His older brother, Kawika, is also a professional volleyball player. Shoji attended Punahou School, where he won three consecutive men's state titles as a member of the volleyball team.

Shoji attended Stanford University, where he became the first four-time AVCA team All-American. He finished at Stanford as the record-holder for career digs, with 1,402 total digs.

== Career ==
Shoji became a member of the United States senior national team in 2013. He has represented Team USA at the 2016 Summer Olympics, where the team won a bronze medal, the 2020 Summer Olympics, and the 2024 Summer Olympics, where he earned his second bronze medal.

At the club level, Shoji has played for professional clubs in Germany, Poland, Austria, Italy, and Russia. He has played for Polish club ZAKSA since 2021, with whom he has won four Polish League trophies and two CEV Champions League titles.

== Honors ==
=== Club ===
- CEV Champions League
  - 2021–22 – with ZAKSA Kędzierzyn-Koźle
  - 2022–23 – with ZAKSA Kędzierzyn-Koźle
- CEV Cup
  - 2015–16 – with Berlin Recycling Volleys
- Domestic
  - 2013–14 Austrian Cup, with Hypo Tirol Innsbruck
  - 2013–14 Austrian Championship, with Hypo Tirol Innsbruck
  - 2015–16 German Cup, with Berlin Recycling Volleys
  - 2015–16 German Championship, with Berlin Recycling Volleys
  - 2021–22 Polish Cup, with ZAKSA Kędzierzyn-Koźle
  - 2021–22 Polish Championship, with ZAKSA Kędzierzyn-Koźle
  - 2022–23 Polish Cup, with ZAKSA Kędzierzyn-Koźle
  - 2023–24 Polish SuperCup, with ZAKSA Kędzierzyn-Koźle

=== Youth national team ===
- 2006 NORCECA U19 Championship

=== Individual awards ===
- 2007: FIVB U19 World Championship – Best digger
- 2008: NORCECA U21 Championship – Best receiver
- 2008: NORCECA U21 Championship – Best defender
- 2008: NORCECA U21 Championship – Best libero
- 2015: FIVB World Cup – Best libero
- 2019: FIVB Nations League – Best libero
- 2023: NORCECA Championship – Best receiver

== Personal life ==
Shoji publicly came out as queer in a video posted to his Instagram and TikTok accounts on June 13, 2025.

Awards
Preceded by (China) Ren Qi	Best Libero of FIVB World Cup; 2015	Succeeded by (Brazil) Thales Hoss
Preceded by (France) Jenia Grebennikov	Best Libero of FIVB Nations League; 2019	Succeeded by (Brazil) Thales Hoss
