= Wolfdogs Nagoya =

Men's volleyball team based in Inazawa, Japan

- Full name: Toyoda Gosei Wolfdogs Nagoya
- Short name: WD Nagoya (WD名古屋)
- Founded: 1961; 65 years ago
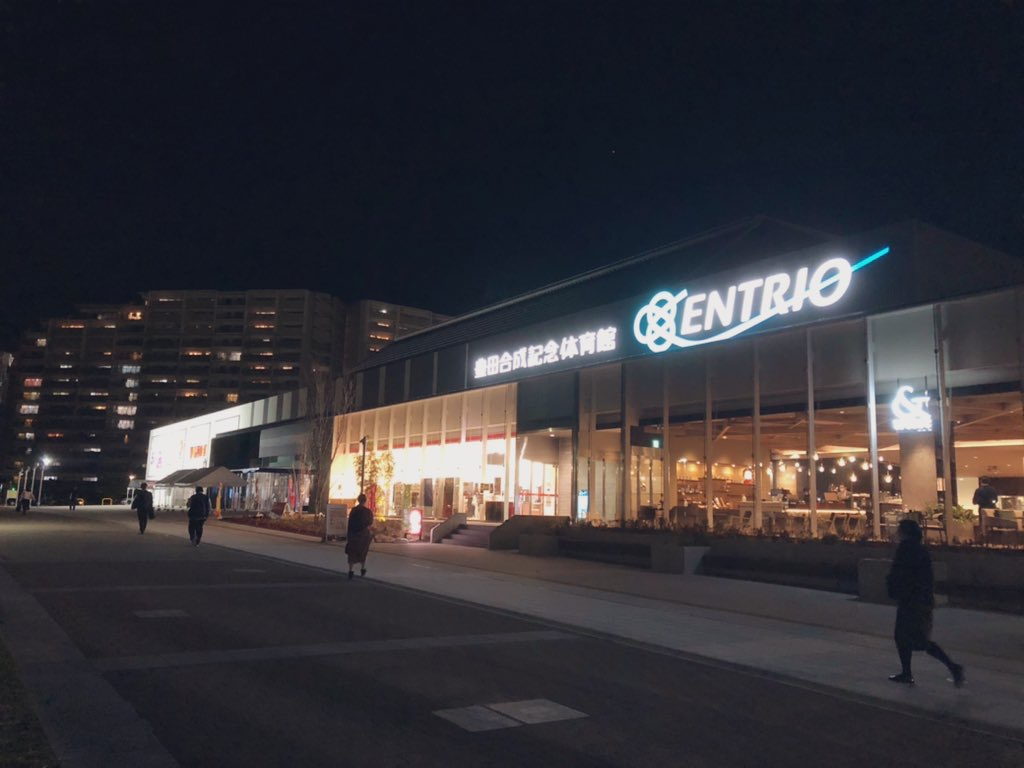
- Ground: ENTRIO（Inazawa, Aichi）
- Head Coach: (Italy) Valerio Baldovin
- Captain: (Japan) Kenta Ichikawa
- League: SV.League
- 2025–26: 4th place
- Website: wolfdogs.jp

The Wolfdogs Nagoya (Japanese: ウルフドッグスなごや) are a men's volleyball team based in Inazawa, Aichi, Japan. The club plays in SV.League, the highest volleyball league in Japan.

== History ==
The Toyota Gosei Trefuerza volleyball team was founded in 1961 by enthusiasts as a 9-player team. In 1981, they transitioned to a 6-player team and began to strengthen themselves as an in-house club. They won all their games in the 29th Industrial League in 1999 and achieved their long-awaited promotion to the V League (then V.Premier League), renaming the team "Toyota Gosei Trefuerza." In 2013, their first foreign coach, Anders Kristiansson, from Sweden, was appointed, and he instilled a precise organizational volleyball style in the team. They placed third in the 2014/15 V.Premier League and won their first championship in the following 2015/16 season. Since then, they have grown into a powerhouse team, finishing as runners-up in the 2016/17 and 2017/18 seasons and reaching the finals for three consecutive years.

From the 2019–20 season, the team changed its name to Wolfdogs Nagoya.

== Honours ==
Japan Volleyball League/V.League/V.Premier League
Winners (2): 2015–16, 2022—23
Runners-up (3): 2016–17, 2017–18, 2021–22
Kurowashiki All Japan Volleyball Championship
Winners (1): 2023
Runners-up (1): 2007
Domestic Sports Festival
Winners (1): 2012

== Current roster ==
The following is the team roster of season 2026/27

No.	Name	Date of birth	Height	Position
1	(Japan) Shuzo Yamada (c)	November 27, 1992 (age 33)	1.93 m (6 ft 4 in)	Outside Hitter
2	(Japan) Akira Sawada	April 24, 2002 (age 24)	2.00 m (6 ft 7 in)	Middle Blocker
3	(Japan) Hideomi Fukatsu	June 1, 1990 (age 36)	1.80 m (5 ft 11 in)	Setter
4	(Japan) Masahiro Yamazaki	September 17, 2002 (age 24)	1.80 m (5 ft 11 in)	Middle Blocker
6	(Germany) Anton Brehme	August 10, 1999 (age 27)	2.06 m (6 ft 9 in)	Middle Blocker
8	(Japan) Ryogo Maeda	May 27, 2003 (age 23)	1.78 m (5 ft 10 in)	Setter
9	(Tunisia) Aymen Bouguerra	November 1, 2001 (age 25)	1.98 m (6 ft 6 in)	Outside Hitter
10	(France) Jenia Grebennikov	August 13, 1990 (age 36)	1.88 m (6 ft 2 in)	Libero
11	(Japan) Ryota Denda	July 3, 1991 (age 35)	1.91 m (6 ft 3 in)	Middle Blocker
12	(Japan) Taito Mizumachi	September 7, 2001 (age 25)	1.82 m (6 ft 0 in)	Outside Hitter
15	(Japan) Kento Miyaura	February 22, 1999 (age 27)	1.90 m (6 ft 3 in)	Opposite
17	(Japan) Kenta Ichikawa	April 6, 1999 (age 27)	1.75 m (5 ft 9 in)	Libero
22	(Japan) Jo Toyoda	November 22, 2002 (age 23)	1.90 m (6 ft 3 in)	Opposite
26	(Japan) Akito Yamazaki	October 16, 1997 (age 29)	1.90 m (6 ft 3 in)	Outside Hitter
44	(Czech Republic) Donovan Dzavoronok	July 23, 1997 (age 29)	2.02 m (6 ft 8 in)	Outside Hitter
99	(Poland) Norbert Huber	August 14, 1998 (age 28)	2.07 m (6 ft 9 in)	Middle Blocker
Head coach: (Italy) Valerio Baldovin

=== Former roster ===
Team roster – Season 2025/26
No.	Name	Date of birth	Height	Position
1	(Japan) Shuzo Yamada (c)	November 27, 1992 (age 33)	1.93 m (6 ft 4 in)	Outside hitter
2	(Japan) Akira Sawada	April 24, 2002 (age 24)	2.00 m (6 ft 7 in)	Middle blocker
3	(Japan) Hideomi Fukatsu	June 1, 1990 (age 36)	1.80 m (5 ft 11 in)	Setter
4	(Japan) Masahiro Yamazaki	September 17, 2002 (age 24)	1.80 m (5 ft 11 in)	Middle blocker
5	(Japan) Shunsuke Watanabe	April 11, 1988 (age 38)	1.81 m (5 ft 11 in)	Libero
6	(France) Timothée Carle	November 30, 1995 (age 30)	1.95 m (6 ft 5 in)	Outside hitter
7	(Japan) Shinnosuke Hayasaka	April 22, 2000 (age 26)	1.77 m (5 ft 10 in)	Setter
9	(Tunisia) Aymen Bouguerra	November 1, 2001 (age 25)	1.98 m (6 ft 6 in)	Outside hitter
10	(Japan) Shunichiro Sato	May 17, 2000 (age 26)	2.05 m (6 ft 9 in)	Middle blocker
11	(Japan) Ryota Denda	July 3, 1991 (age 35)	1.91 m (6 ft 3 in)	Middle blocker
12	(Japan) Taito Mizumachi	September 7, 2001 (age 25)	1.82 m (6 ft 0 in)	Outside hitter
15	(Japan) Kento Miyaura	February 22, 1999 (age 27)	1.90 m (6 ft 3 in)	Opposite
17	(Japan) Kenta Ichikawa	April 6, 1999 (age 27)	1.75 m (5 ft 9 in)	Libero
18	(Japan) Naozumi Kambayashi	October 4, 1998 (age 28)	1.84 m (6 ft 0 in)	Setter
22	(Japan) Jo Toyoda	November 22, 2002 (age 23)	1.90 m (6 ft 3 in)	Opposite
26	(Japan) Akito Yamazaki	October 16, 1997 (age 29)	1.90 m (6 ft 3 in)	Outside hitter
99	(Poland) Norbert Huber	August 14, 1998 (age 28)	2.07 m (6 ft 9 in)	Middle blocker
Head coach: (Italy) Valerio Baldovin

Team roster – Season 2024/25
No.	Name	Date of birth	Height	Position
1	Shuzo Yamada	November 27, 1992 (age 33)	1.93 m (6 ft 4 in)	Outside hitter
3	Hideomi Fukatsu	June 1, 1990 (age 36)	1.80 m (5 ft 11 in)	Setter
5	Shunsuke Watanabe	April 11, 1988 (age 38)	1.81 m (5 ft 11 in)	Libero
6	Hirotaka Kon	March 9, 1988 (age 38)	1.90 m (6 ft 3 in)	Middle blocker
7	Tine Urnaut	September 3, 1988 (age 38)	2.00 m (6 ft 7 in)	Outside hitter
8	Dongchen Wang	June 1, 2000 (age 26)	2.05 m (6 ft 9 in)	Middle blocker
9	Kenta Takanashi	March 25, 1997 (age 29)	1.90 m (6 ft 3 in)	Outside hitter
10	Rivan Nurmulki	July 16, 1995 (age 31)	1.98 m (6 ft 6 in)	Opposite spiker
11	Ryota Denda	July 3, 1991 (age 35)	1.91 m (6 ft 3 in)	Middle blocker
11	Taito Mizumachi	September 7, 2001 (age 25)	1.82 m (6 ft 0 in)	Outside hitter
13	Takaki Koyama	November 23, 1997 (age 28)	1.90 m (6 ft 3 in)	Middle blocker
14	Nimir Abdel-Aziz	February 5, 1992 (age 34)	2.01 m (6 ft 7 in)	Opposite spiker
17	Kenta Ichikawa	April 6, 1999 (age 27)	1.75 m (5 ft 9 in)	Libero
17	Naozumi Kanbayashi	October 4, 1998 (age 28)	1.84 m (6 ft 0 in)	Setter
19	Ryo Takahashi	July 30, 1998 (age 28)	1.89 m (6 ft 2 in)	Outside hitter
26	Akito Yamazaki	October 16, 1997 (age 29)	1.90 m (6 ft 3 in)	Outside hitter
Head coach: (Italy) Valerio Baldovin

Team roster – Season 2023/24
No.	Name	Date of birth	Height	Position
1	Shuzo Yamada	November 27, 1992 (age 33)	1.93 m (6 ft 4 in)	Outside hitter
3	Bartosz Kurek (c)	August 29, 1988 (age 38)	2.05 m (6 ft 9 in)	Opposite hitter
6	Hirotaka Kon	March 9, 1988 (age 38)	1.90 m (6 ft 3 in)	Middle blocker
8	Dongchen Wang	June 1, 2000 (age 26)	2.05 m (6 ft 9 in)	Middle blocker
9	Kenta Takanashi	March 25, 1997 (age 29)	1.90 m (6 ft 3 in)	Outside hitter
11	Ryota Denda	July 3, 1991 (age 35)	1.91 m (6 ft 3 in)	Middle blocker
13	Takaki Koyama	November 23, 1997 (age 28)	1.90 m (6 ft 3 in)	Outside hitter
14	Ryosuke Tsubakiyama	July 18, 1988 (age 38)	1.96 m (6 ft 5 in)	Opposite spiker
16	Nakano Yamato	October 2, 1999 (age 27)	1.79 m (5 ft 10 in)	Setter
17	Kenta Ichikawa	April 6, 1999 (age 27)	1.75 m (5 ft 9 in)	Libero
19	Ryo Takahashi	July 30, 1998 (age 28)	1.89 m (6 ft 2 in)	Outside hitter
21	Motoki Eiro	June 8, 1996 (age 30)	1.92 m (6 ft 4 in)	Setter
23	Masato Katsuoka	July 3, 1996 (age 30)	1.82 m (6 ft 0 in)	Outside Hitter
24	Tomohiro Ogawa	July 4, 1996 (age 30)	1.75 m (5 ft 9 in)	Libero
26	Akito Yamazaki	October 16, 1997 (age 29)	1.90 m (6 ft 3 in)	Outside hitter
Head coach: (Italy) Valerio Baldovin

== League results ==
Champion Runner-up

League		Position	Teams	Matches	Won	Lost
V League	1998–99	9th	10	18	2	16
V League	1999–2000	9th	10	18	2	16
V League	2000–01	Winners (Note: Second tier, lost promotion play-offs)	8	14	14	0
V League	2001–02	Winners (Note: Second tier, won promotion play-offs)	8	14	14	0
V League	2002–03	7th	8	21	4	17
V League	2003–04	6th	8	21	10	11
V League	2004–05	7th	8	28	9	19
V League	2005–06	7th	8	28	6	22
V・Premier League	2006–07	4th	8	28	16	12
V・Premier League	2007–08	5th	8	28	14	14
V・Premier League	2008–09	6th	8	28	12	16
V・Premier League	2009–10	4th	8	28	16	12
V・Premier League	2010–11	6th	8	24	9	15
V・Premier League	2011–12	6th	8	21	7	14
V・Premier League	2012–13	5th	8	28	12	16
V・Premier League	2013–14	5th	8	28	15	13
V・Premier League	2014–15	3rd	8	21	13	8
V・Premier League	2015–16	Winners	8	21	15	6
V・Premier League	2016–17	Runners-up	8	21	15	6
V・Premier League	2017–18	Runners-up	8	21	15	6
V.League Division 1	2018–19	5th	10	27	19	8
V.League Division 1	2019–20	7th	10	27	10	17
V.League Division 1	2020–21	3rd	10	34	27	7
V.League Division 1	2021–22	Runners-up	10	39	28	11
V.League Division 1	2022–23	Winners	10	40	29	11
V.League Division 1	2023–24	5th place	10	38	25	13
SV.League	2024-25	4th place	10	49	38	11
SV.League	2025-26	4th place	10	48	27	21

== Notable players ==
- Tuomas Sammelvuo (FIN) (2005–2006)
- Igor Omrčen (CRO) (2014–2019)
- Bartosz Kurek (POL) (2021–2024)
- Nimir Abdel-Aziz (NED) (2024–2025)
- Tine Urnaut (SLO) (2024-25)
- Kenta Takanashi (JPN) (2018–2025)
