= Dave Shoji =

American volleyball coach

Biographical details
- Born: December 4, 1946 (age 79); Upland, California

Playing career

Baseball
- 1967: UC Santa Barbara

Men's volleyball
- 1968–1969: UC Santa Barbara

Coaching career (HC unless noted)

Women's volleyball
- 1975–2016: Hawaii

Men's volleyball
- 1979–1985: Hawaii

Head coaching record
- Overall: 1107–185–1 (.857) (Women's); 81–48 (.628) (Men's)

Accomplishments and honors

Championships
- 4 National (1979, 1982, 1983, 1987); 16 WAC regular season (1996–2011); 11 WAC conference tournament (1998, 2001–2009, 2011); 8 Big West regular season (1988–1990, 1995, 2012, 2013, 2015, 2016); PCAA regular season (1987)

Awards
- 2× AVCA Coach of the Year (1982, 2009); 10× WAC Coach of the Year

Dave Shoji (born December 4, 1946) is an American sports coach who was the head coach of the University of Hawaiʻi at Mānoa Rainbow Wahine volleyball team from 1975 to 2017. Under his leadership, the Rainbow Wahine won four national titles (1979, 1982, 1983, 1987).

As of September 6, 2013 his record was 1,107–185–1, which translates to a winning percentage of 85.7%. On September 6, 2013 he became the winningest coach in Division I women's volleyball history with 1,107 wins, breaking the record formerly held by former UCLA head coach Andy Banachowski. Shoji earned the win in 4 games over Santa Clara University. His teams are known for having great ball control.

Shoji coached many standout players, including Deitre Collins, Teee Williams, Angelica Ljungqvist, Robyn Ah Mow-Santos, Kim Willoughby, Kanani Danielson and Nikki Taylor. Ah-Mow Santos succeeded Shoji as head coach of the Rainbow Wahine after his retirement on February 20, 2017.

Shoji played collegiate volleyball at the University of California, Santa Barbara, serving as the team's setter and earning All-American honors in 1968 and 1969. Shoji is also a graduate of the University of Hawaii ROTC program.

Shoji's elder son, Kawika Shoji, was a 3-year starting setter for the Stanford Cardinal men's volleyball team. During his senior year in 2010 Kawika led Stanford to the 2010 NCAA national championship and was selected as the American Volleyball Coaches Association (AVCA) player-of-the-year. Shoji's younger son, Erik Shoji, played as a libero for Stanford's volleyball team. Erik was the first player in AVCA history to earn first-team AVCA honors four years in a row.

== Early life ==
Shoji was born on December 4, 1946. His father, Kobe Shoji, was a veteran of the 442nd Infantry Regiment who won two Purple Hearts. When he was four, his family moved to Honolulu, Hawaii, where his father became a well-known expert in sugar cane production.

== Head coaching record ==
=== Women's ===
Record table
Season	Team	Overall	Conference	Standing	Postseason
Hawaii Rainbow Wahine (1975–1984)
1975	Hawaii	16–2			AIAW runner-up
1976	Hawaii	14–5			AIAW 3rd Place
1977	Hawaii	22–5			AIAW runner-up
1978	Hawaii	28–10–1			AIAW 3rd Place
1979	Hawaii	36–5			AIAW Champion
1980	Hawaii	34–10			AIAW 3rd Place
1981	Hawaii	37–2			NCAA Regional final
1982	Hawaii	33–1			NCAA Champion
1983	Hawaii	34–2			NCAA Champion
1984	Hawaii	33–11			NCAA first round
Hawaii Rainbow Wahine (Pacific Coast Athletic Association / Big West Conference) (1985–1995)
1985	Hawaii	28–13	10–6	3rd	NCAA regional semifinal
1986	Hawaii	31–7	15–3	2nd	NCAA Regional final
1987	Hawaii	37–2	17–1	1st	NCAA Champion
1988	Hawaii	33–3	18–0	1st	NCAA runner-up
1989	Hawaii	29–3	17–1	1st	NCAA Regional final
1990	Hawaii	28–6	16–2	1st	NCAA regional semifinal
1991	Hawaii	26–5	15–3	2nd	NCAA Regional final
1992	Hawaii	15–12	11–7	4th	
1993	Hawaii	19–11	13–5	3rd	NCAA Regional final
1994	Hawaii	25–5	15–3	2nd	NCAA regional semifinal
1995	Hawaii	31–1	18–0	1st	NCAA Regional final
Hawaii Rainbow Wahine (Western Athletic Conference) (1996–2011)
1996	Hawaii	35–3	16–0	1st	NCAA runner-up
1997	Hawaii	25–8	14–0	1st	NCAA first round
1998	Hawaii	32–3	13–1	1st	NCAA Regional final
1999	Hawaii	29–2	14–0	1st	NCAA regional semifinal
2000	Hawaii	31–2	16–0	1st	NCAA Final Four
2001	Hawaii	29–6	13–0	1st	NCAA regional semifinal
2002	Hawaii	34–2	13–0	1st	NCAA Final Four
2003	Hawaii	36–2	13–0	1st	NCAA Final Four
2004	Hawaii	30–1	13–0	1st	NCAA regional semifinal
2005	Hawaii	27–7	16–0	1st	NCAA regional semifinal
2006	Hawaii	29–6	15–1	1st	NCAA Regional final
2007	Hawaii	27–6	15–1	1st	NCAA second round
2008	Hawaii	31–4	15–1	1st	NCAA Regional final
2009	Hawaii	32–3	16–0	1st	NCAA Final Four
2010	Hawaii	29–3	16–0	1st	NCAA second round
2011	Hawaii	31–2	16–0	1st	NCAA regional semifinal
Hawaii Rainbow Wahine (Big West Conference) (2012–2016)
2012	Hawaii	27–3	18–0	1st	NCAA second round
2013	Hawaii	25–5	13–3	1st	NCAA second round
2014	Hawaii	22–7	13–3	2nd	NCAA second round
2015	Hawaii	29–2	16–0	1st	NCAA Regional final
2016	Hawaii	23–6	15–1	1st	NCAA second round
Hawaii:		1107–185–1 (.857)	474–42 (.919)		
Total:		1107–185–1 (.857)			
National champion Postseason invitational champion Conference regular season champion Conference regular season and conference tournament champion Division regular season champion Division regular season and conference tournament champion Conference tournament champion

=== Men's ===
Record table
Season	Team	Overall	Conference	Standing	Postseason
Hawaii Rainbow Warriors (1979–1980)
1979	Hawaii	5–2			
1980	Hawaii	13–2	10–0		
Hawaii Rainbow Warriors (California Intercollegiate Volleyball Association) (1981–1985)
1981	Hawaii	12–9	8–8	5th	
1982	Hawaii	14–8	9–7	T–4th	
1983	Hawaii	12–7	10–6	T–4th	
1984	Hawaii	11–9	9–9	T–6th	
1985	Hawaii	14–11 (Note: Shoji and Jim Smoot served as co-coaches during the 1985 season)	9–9	6th	
Hawaii:		81–48 (.628)	55–39 (.585)		
Total:		81–48 (.628)			
National champion Postseason invitational champion Conference regular season champion Conference regular season and conference tournament champion Division regular season champion Division regular season and conference tournament champion Conference tournament champion

== See also ==
- List of college women's volleyball coaches with 700 wins

== In film ==
Dave Shoji's role in the first few years of women's athletics at the University of Hawaii is chronicled in the documentary film Rise of the Wahine, directed by Dean Kaneshiro. Dave was hired by UH's first female Athletic Director Dr. Donnis Thompson shortly after the passing of Title IX.

== NCAA representation ==
On November 1, 2005, NCAA named an NCAA Division I Women's Volleyball 25th Anniversary Team. The team featured Middle Blocker Deitre Collins and Coach Dave Shoji as head coach, of seven total honorees. Tonya "Teee" Williams had also been further named to the 1980s NCAA all-Decade team for accolades.

== Personal life ==
Shoji and his wife, the former Mary Tennefos, reside in Manoa. They have three children, Cobey, Kawika and Erik. Cobey is married to Coleman Hutzler.

Shoji's brother, Tom, was a collegiate women's volleyball coach for 35 years with stops at New Mexico State, Indiana, CSU Pueblo and Williamette. Shoji's niece, Malia, is currently the head women's volleyball at UNLV.
