= Michał Kozłowski =

Polish volleyball player

Personal information
- Born: 16 February 1985 (age 41); Gorlice, Poland
- Height: 1.91 m (6 ft 3 in)
- Weight: 88 kg (194 lb)
- Spike: 337 cm (133 in)
- Block: 312 cm (123 in)

Volleyball information
- Position: Setter
- Current club: Projekt Warsaw
- Number: 85

Career
| Years | Teams |
|---|---|
| 2004–2007; 2007–2008; 2008–2013; 2013–2014; 2014–2016; 2016; 2016–2017; 2017–2019; 2019–2021; 2021–2022; 2022–2024; 2024– | ZAKSA Kędzierzyn-Koźle; Stal Nysa; Fart Kielce; AZS Częstochowa; ACH Volley; AS Cannes; Espadon Szczecin; Trefl Gdańsk; Projekt Warsaw; ZAKSA Kędzierzyn-Koźle; Warta Zawiercie; Projekt Warsaw |

Michał Kozłowski (born 16 February 1985) is a Polish professional volleyball player who plays as a setter for Projekt Warsaw.

== Honours ==
=== Club ===
- CEV Champions League
  - 2021–22 – with ZAKSA Kędzierzyn-Koźle
- Domestic
  - 2014–15 Slovenian Cup, with ACH Volley
  - 2014–15 Slovenian Championship, with ACH Volley
  - 2015–16 Slovenian Championship, with ACH Volley
  - 2017–18 Polish Cup, with Trefl Gdańsk
  - 2021–22 Polish Cup, with ZAKSA Kędzierzyn-Koźle
  - 2021–22 Polish Championship, with ZAKSA Kędzierzyn-Koźle
  - 2023–24 Polish Cup, with Aluron CMC Warta Zawiercie

=== Youth national team ===
- 2003 CEV U19 European Championship
- 2003 European Youth Summer Olympic Festival
