= Anton Brehme =

German volleyball player (born 1999)

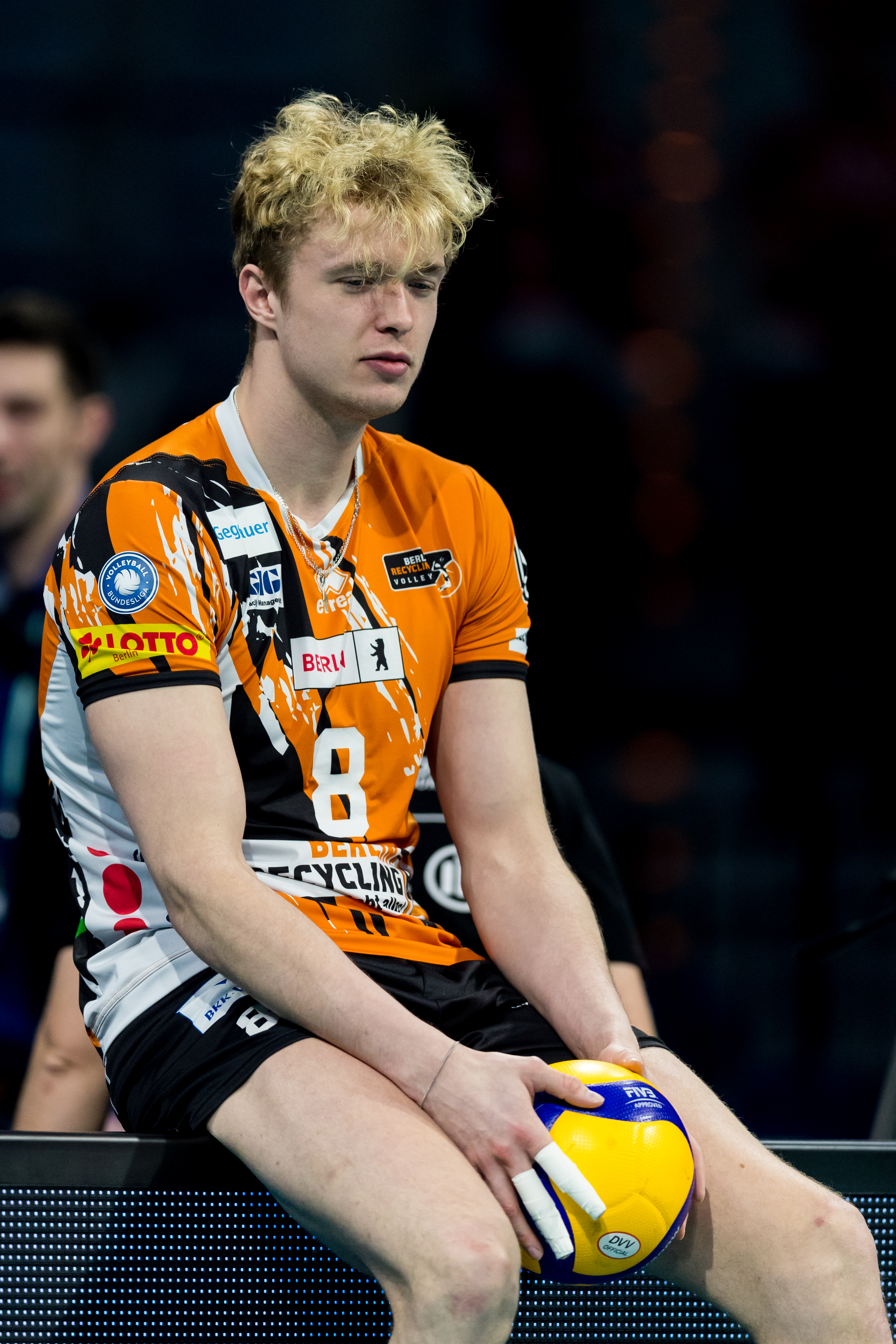

Personal information
- Born: 10 August 1999 (age 27); Leipzig, Germany
- Height: 2.06 m (6 ft 9 in)
- Weight: 97 kg (214 lb)
- Spike: 350 cm (138 in)

Volleyball information
- Position: Middle blocker
- Current club: Wolfdogs Nagoya
- Number: 6

Career
Years	Teams
2019–2020; 2020–2023; 2023–2024; 2024–2026; 2026–	SVG Lüneburg; Berlin Recycling Volleys; Modena Volley; Jastrzębski Węgiel; Wolfdogs Nagoya

National team
Germany

Anton Brehme (born 10 August 1999) is a German professional volleyball player who plays as a middle blocker for Wolfdogs Nagoya and the Germany national team.

== Personal life ==
He has a twin brother, Louis, and an older sister, Thea. Both Anton and Louis began their volleyball career at SV Reudnitz.

== Honours ==
=== Club ===
- Domestic
  - 2020–21 German SuperCup, with Berlin Recycling Volleys
  - 2020–21 German Championship, with Berlin Recycling Volleys
  - 2021–22 German SuperCup, with Berlin Recycling Volleys
  - 2021–22 German Championship, with Berlin Recycling Volleys
  - 2022–23 German SuperCup, with Berlin Recycling Volleys
  - 2022–23 German Cup, with Berlin Recycling Volleys
  - 2022–23 German Championship, with Berlin Recycling Volleys
  - 2024–25 Polish Cup, with Jastrzębski Węgiel
