= Eemi Tervaportti =

Finnish volleyball player (born 1989)

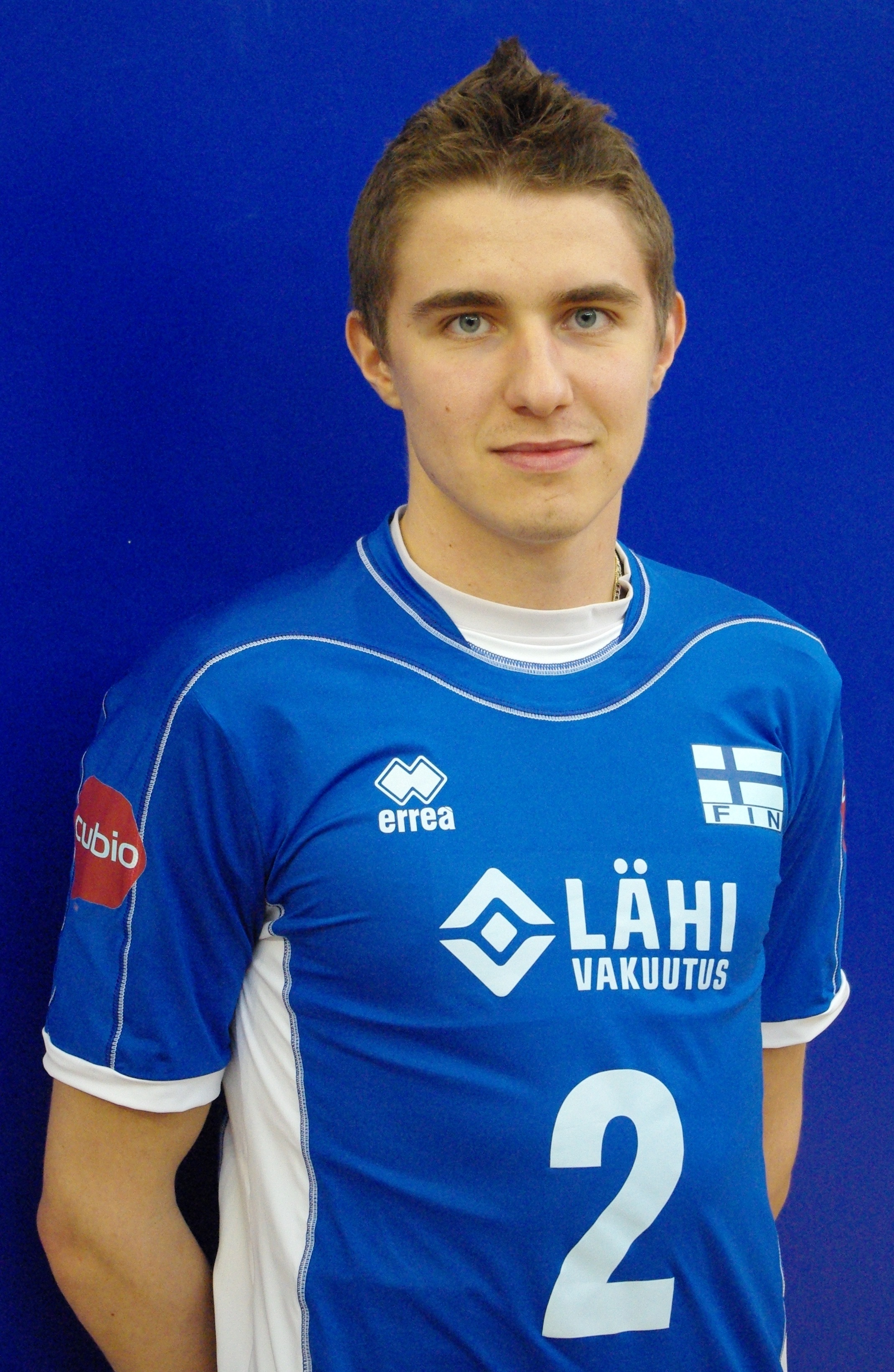

Personal information
- Born: 26 July 1989 (age 37); Äetsä, Finland
- Height: 1.93 m (6 ft 4 in)
- Weight: 80 kg (176 lb)
- Spike: 338 cm (133 in)
- Block: 317 cm (125 in)

Volleyball information
- Position: Setter
- Current club: Gebze Belediyesi

Career
Years	Teams
2006–2007; 2007–2009; 2009–2010; 2010–2011; 2011–2012; 2012–2015; 2015–2016; 2016–2017; 2017–2018; 2018–2020; 2020–2023; 2023–2024; 2024–2025; 2025–	Valkeakosken; Raision Loimu; Sun Volley Oulu; Avignon VB; GFC Ajaccio VB; Knack Roeselare; Galatasaray; Stade Poitevin Poitiers; Espadon Szczecin; Olympiacos; Jastrzębski Węgiel; Epicentr-Podolyany; AZS Olsztyn; Gebze Belediyesi

National team
2010–	Finland
Honours
Men's volleyball
Representing Finland
CEV European Championship
Bronze medal – third place	2026 Bulgaria/Finland/Italy/Romania

Eemi Tervaportti (born 26 July 1989) is a Finnish professional volleyball player who plays as a setter for Gebze Belediyesi and the Finland national team.

== Honours ==
=== Club ===
- CEV Champions League
  - 2022–23 – with Jastrzębski Węgiel
- Domestic
  - 2009–10 Finnish Cup, with Sun Volley Oulu
  - 2009–10 Finnish Championship, with Sun Volley Oulu
  - 2012–13 Belgian Cup, with Knack Roeselare
  - 2012–13 Belgian Championship, with Knack Roeselare
  - 2013–14 Belgian SuperCup, with Knack Roeselare
  - 2013–14 Belgian Championship, with Knack Roeselare
  - 2014–15 Belgian SuperCup, with Knack Roeselare
  - 2014–15 Belgian Championship, with Knack Roeselare
  - 2018–19 Greek League Cup, with Olympiacos
  - 2018–19 Greek Championship, with Olympiacos
  - 2020–21 Polish Championship, with Jastrzębski Węgiel
  - 2021–22 Polish SuperCup, with Jastrzębski Węgiel
  - 2022–23 Polish SuperCup, with Jastrzębski Węgiel
  - 2022–23 Polish Championship, with Jastrzębski Węgiel
  - 2023–24 Ukrainian SuperCup, with Epicentr-Podolyany
  - 2023–24 Ukrainian Cup, with Epicentr-Podolyany

=== Individual awards ===
- 2013: Best Finnish volleyball player
- 2023: Best Finnish volleyball player
