= Kawika Shoji =

American volleyball player

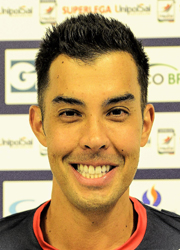

Personal information
- Full name: Kawika Tennefos Shoji
- Born: November 11, 1987 (age 38); Honolulu, Hawaii, U.S.
- Height: 6 ft 3 in (1.90 m)
- Education: Stanford University

Volleyball information
- Position: Setter

Career
Years	Teams
2007–2010; 2010–2011; 2011–2015; 2015–2016; 2016–2017; 2017–2018; 2018–2020; 2020–2021; 2021–2022	Stanford Cardinal; Isku Volley; Berlin Recycling Volleys; Arkas İzmir; Lokomotiv Novosibirsk; Gi Group Monza; Asseco Resovia; Kioene Padova; Spor Toto

National team
2011–2021	United States
Medal record
Men's volleyball
Representing United States
Olympic Games
Bronze medal – third place	2016 Rio de Janeiro
FIVB World Championship
Bronze medal – third place	2018 Italy/Bulgaria
FIVB World Cup
Gold medal – first place	2015 Japan
FIVB World League
Gold medal – first place	2014 Florence
Bronze medal – third place	2015 Rio de Janeiro
FIVB Nations League
Silver medal – second place	2019 Chicago
Bronze medal – third place	2018 Lille
Pan American Cup
Gold medal – first place	2012 Santo Domingo
NORCECA Championship
Gold medal – first place	2017 United States

Kawika Tennefos Shoji (born November 11, 1987) is an American former professional volleyball player. He was a member of the U.S. national team from 2011 to 2021. The 2014 World League and the 2015 World Cup winner.

== Personal life ==
Kawika's parents are Dave and Mary Shoji. His younger brother Erik Shoji is also a player (libero) for the United States men's national team. He has jokingly referred to himself as "the older, taller, more handsome, but less talented Shoji brother." He and his wife, Megan, married in 2014.

== Honors ==
=== Club ===
- Domestic
  - 2011–12 German Championship, with Berlin Recycling Volleys
  - 2012–13 German Championship, with Berlin Recycling Volleys
  - 2013–14 German Championship, with Berlin Recycling Volleys
