= Nisei Soldiers of World War II Congressional Gold Medal =

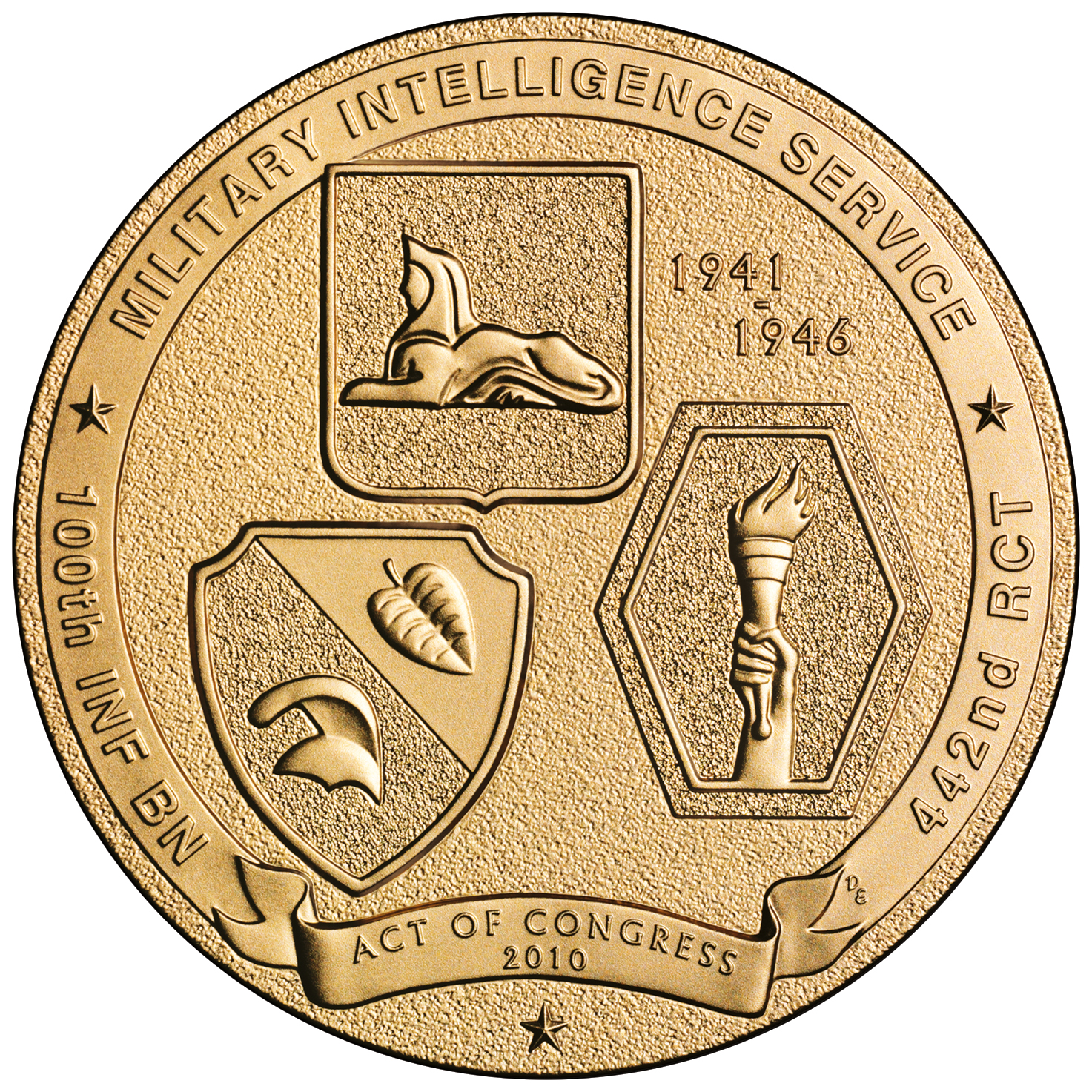
Congressional Gold Medal (reverse)

The Nisei Soldiers of World War II Congressional Gold Medal is an award made for the Japanese American World War II veterans of the 100th Infantry Battalion, the 442nd Regimental Combat Team and the Military Intelligence Service. The Congressional Gold Medal is the most prestigious award given to civilians in the United States for achievements and contributions. The medal was approved by Congress under Public Law 111–254 in 2010 to honor the Japanese Americans who had served in the war. It was collectively presented on November 2, 2011.

== See also ==
- Congressional Gold Medal
- Japanese-American service in World War II
- List of Congressional Gold Medal recipients
