= Yuriy Gladyr =

Ukrainian–Polish volleyball player (born 1984)

- Gladyr in 2024

Personal information
- Born: 8 July 1984 (age 42) Poltava, Soviet Union, Ukraine
- Height: 2.02 m (6 ft 8 in)
- Weight: 96 kg (212 lb)
- Spike: 360 cm (142 in)

Volleyball information
- Position: Middle blocker
- Current club: Ziraat Bankası Ankara
- Number: 13

Career
- Years: Team
- 2004–2006 2006–2008 2008–2009 2009–2016 2016–2017 2017–2018 2018–2019 2019–2024 2024–2026 2026–: Azot Cherkasy; Lokomotiv Kyiv; AZS Politechnika Warszawska; ZAKSA Kędzierzyn-Koźle; Skra Bełchatów; Fenerbahçe; Emma Villas Volley; Jastrzębski Węgiel; Warta Zawiercie; Ziraat Bankası Ankara

National team
- Years: Team
- 2007–2011: Ukraine

Yuriy Gladyr (Ukrainian: Юрій Гладир; born 8 July 1984) is a Ukrainian professional volleyball player with Polish citizenship (since 14 January 2013) who plays as a middle blocker for Ziraat Bankası Ankara. Gladyr is a former member of the Ukraine national team.

== Career ==
=== Club ===
Gladyr spent the 2008–09 PlusLiga season, playing in AZS Politechnika Warszawska. In 2009, he moved to ZAKSA Kędzierzyn-Koźle. In the 2010–11 PlusLiga season he achieved his first silver medal of the Polish Championship. On 12 March 2011 ZAKSA, including Gladyr, achieved a silver medal of the CEV Cup. In the 2011–12 PlusLiga season he gained a bronze medal after winning matches with Jastrzębski Węgiel. On 27 January 2013 he won the Polish Cup. In the 2012–13 PlusLiga season, Gladyr achieved his second silver medal of the Polish Championship, in the final his team lost to Asseco Resovia. On 16 March 2014 he won the Polish Cup with ZAKSA. In 2015 he extended his contract with the club. In 2016 he left ZAKSA and joined PGE Skra Bełchatów.

== Honours ==
=== Club ===
- CEV Champions League
  - 2022–23 – with Jastrzębski Węgiel
  - 2023–24 – with Jastrzębski Węgiel
  - 2024–25 – with Aluron CMC Warta Zawiercie
  - 2025–26 – with Aluron CMC Warta Zawiercie
- CEV Cup
  - 2010–11 – with ZAKSA Kędzierzyn-Koźle
- Domestic
  - 2005–06 Ukrainian Championship, with Azot Cherkassy
  - 2007–08 Ukrainian Championship, with Lokomotiv Kyiv
  - 2012–13 Polish Cup, with ZAKSA Kędzierzyn-Koźle
  - 2013–14 Polish Cup, with ZAKSA Kędzierzyn-Koźle
  - 2015–16 Polish Championship, with ZAKSA Kędzierzyn-Koźle
  - 2017–18 Turkish Supercup, with Fenerbahçe
  - 2020–21 Polish Championship, with Jastrzębski Węgiel
  - 2021–22 Polish SuperCup, with Jastrzębski Węgiel
  - 2022–23 Polish SuperCup, with Jastrzębski Węgiel
  - 2022–23 Polish Championship, with Jastrzębski Węgiel
  - 2023–24 Polish Championship, with Jastrzębski Węgiel
  - 2024–25 Polish SuperCup, with Aluron CMC Warta Zawiercie
  - 2025–26 Polish Championship, with Aluron CMC Warta Zawiercie

=== Individual awards ===
- 2011: Polish Cup – Best blocker
- 2022: Polish SuperCup – Most valuable player
- 2026: CEV Champions League – Best middle blocker

=== Statistics ===
- 2020–21 PlusLiga – Best server (59 aces)
