= 2020–21 Polish Men's Volleyball Cup =

2020–21 Polish Volleyball Cup
- Sport: Volleyball
- Duration: 13–14 March 2021
- TV partner: Polsat Sport

Finals
- Champions: ZAKSA Kędzierzyn-Koźle (8th title)
- Finals MVP: Kamil Semeniuk (POL)

Seasons
- ← 2018–19 2021–22 →

The 2020–21 Polish Cup was the 64th edition of the Polish Volleyball Cup tournament.

ZAKSA Kędzierzyn-Koźle beat Jastrzębski Węgiel in the final (3–0) and won their eighth Polish Cup.

== Final four ==
- Venue: HWS Suche Stawy, Kraków
- All times are Central European Time (UTC+01:00).

Semifinals
13 March
ZAKSA Kędzierzyn-Koźle	3
Aluron CMC Warta Zawiercie	2
13 March
Jastrzębski Węgiel	3
Trefl Gdańsk	0

Final
14 March
ZAKSA Kędzierzyn-Koźle	3
Jastrzębski Węgiel	0

=== Semifinals ===
Date	Time		Score		Set 1	Set 2	Set 3	Set 4	Set 5	Total	Report
13 Mar	14:45	ZAKSA Kędzierzyn-Koźle	3–2	Aluron CMC Warta Zawiercie	20–25	25–19	25–18	20–25	15–11	105–98	Report
13 Mar	17:30	Jastrzębski Węgiel	3–0	Trefl Gdańsk	25–22	25–18	25–19			75–59	Report

=== Final ===
Date	Time		Score		Set 1	Set 2	Set 3	Set 4	Set 5	Total	Report
14 Mar	14:45	ZAKSA Kędzierzyn-Koźle	3–0	Jastrzębski Węgiel	25–20	27–25	25–15			77–60	Report

== Final standings ==
Qualified for the 2021 Polish SuperCup

Rank	Team
1st place, gold medalist(s)	ZAKSA Kędzierzyn-Koźle
2	Jastrzębski Węgiel
Semifinalists	Aluron CMC Warta Zawiercie; Trefl Gdańsk

2020–21 Polish Cup winners
ZAKSA Kędzierzyn-Koźle
8th title

== See also ==
- 2020–21 PlusLiga
