= 2021–22 CEV Champions League =

- League: CEV Champions League
- Sport: Volleyball
- Duration: Qualifying round: 22 September – 10 November 2021; Main tournament: 30 November 2021 – 22 May 2022
- Number of teams: 35 (17 qual. + 18 main tourn.)

Finals
- Venue: (Slovenia) Ljubljana
- Champions: (Poland) ZAKSA Kędzierzyn-Koźle
- Finals MVP: (Poland) Kamil Semeniuk

CEV Champions League seasons
- ← 2020–21 2022–23 →

The 2021–22 CEV Champions League was the 63rd edition of the highest level European volleyball club competition organised by the European Volleyball Confederation.

== Qualification ==
Rank	Country	Number of teams			Qualified teams
Rank	Country	Vac	Qual	Total	Qualified teams
1	Italy	3	–	3	Cucine Lube Civitanova
1	Italy	3	–	3	Sir Sicoma Monini Perugia
1	Italy	3	–	3	Itas Trentino
2	Russia	3	–	3	Dynamo Moscow
2	Russia	3	–	3	Zenit Saint Petersburg
2	Russia	3	–	3	Lokomotiv Novosibirsk
3	Poland	3	–	3	Jastrzębski Węgiel
3	Poland	3	–	3	ZAKSA Kędzierzyn-Koźle
3	Poland	3	–	3	Projekt Warsaw
4	Germany	2	–	2	Berlin Recycling Volleys
4	Germany	2	–	2	VfB Friedrichshafen
5	Turkey	2	–	2	Ziraat Bankası Ankara
5	Turkey	2	–	2	Fenerbahçe HDI İstanbul
6	Belgium	2	–	2	Knack Roeselare
6	Belgium	2	–	2	Greenyard Maaseik
7	France	1	–	1	AS Cannes Dragons
8	Slovenia	1	–	1	Merkur Maribor
9	Serbia	1	–	1	Vojvodina NS Seme Novi Sad
14	Portugal	–	1	1	Sport Lisboa e Benfica
15	Bulgaria	–	1	1	Hebar Pazardzhik

== Pools composition ==
Drawing of Lots was held on 24 September 2021 in Ljubljana.

Pool A	Pool B	Pool C
Jastrzębski Węgiel	Dynamo Moscow	Cucine Lube Civitanova
VfB Friedrichshafen	Ziraat Bankası Ankara	ZAKSA Kędzierzyn-Koźle
Knack Roeselare	Greenyard Maaseik	Merkur Maribor
Hebar Pazardzhik	Projekt Warsaw	Lokomotiv Novosibirsk

Pool D	Pool E
Zenit Saint Petersburg	Sir Sicoma Monini Perugia
Berlin Recycling Volleys	Fenerbahçe HDI İstanbul
Vojvodina NS Seme Novi Sad	AS Cannes Dragons
Sport Lisboa e Benfica	Itas Trentino

== League round ==
- 20 teams compete in the League round.
- The teams are split into 5 groups, each one featuring four teams.
- The top team in each pool and 3 best 2nd placed teams qualify for the quarterfinals.
- All times are local.

=== Pool standing procedure ===
1. Number of victories
2. Points
3. Set ratio
4. Setpoint ratio
5. H2H results

Result	Winners	Losers
3–0	3 points	0 points
3–1	3 points	0 points
3–2	2 points	1 point

=== Pool A ===
Pos	Team	Pld	W	L	Pts	SW	SL	SR	SPW	SPL	SPR	Qualification
1	(Poland) Jastrzębski Węgiel	6	6	0	18	18	2	9.000	499	381	1.310	Quarterfinals
2	(Bulgaria) Hebar Pazardzhik	6	3	3	7	10	13	0.769	418	509	0.821	
3	(Belgium) Knack Roeselare	6	2	4	5	8	16	0.500	512	539	0.950	
4	(Germany) VfB Friedrichshafen	6	1	5	6	10	15	0.667	493	493	1.000	

Source: CEV

Date	Time		Score		Set 1	Set 2	Set 3	Set 4	Set 5	Total	Report
30 Nov	18:00	Jastrzębski Węgiel (Poland)	3–0	(Bulgaria) Hebar Pazardzhik	25–11	25–16	25–14			75–41	Report
1 Dec	20:00	VfB Friedrichshafen (Germany)	2–3	(Belgium) Knack Roeselare	18–25	25–23	16–25	25–22	9–15	93–110	Report
14 Dec	19:00	Knack Roeselare (Belgium)	0–3	(Poland) Jastrzębski Węgiel	18–25	20–25	23–25			61–75	Report
16 Dec	19:00	Hebar Pazardzhik (Bulgaria)	3–2	(Germany) VfB Friedrichshafen	25–13	18–25	22–25	25–12	15–12	105–87	Report
13 Jan	20:00	VfB Friedrichshafen (Germany)	0–3	(Poland) Jastrzębski Węgiel	15–25	17–25	15–25			47–75	Report
25 Jan	18:00	Jastrzębski Węgiel (Poland)	3–0	(Belgium) Knack Roeselare	25–21	25–21	25–23			75–65	Report
26 Jan	20:00	VfB Friedrichshafen (Germany)	3–0	(Bulgaria) Hebar Pazardzhik	25–0	25–0	25–0			75–0	Report
9 Feb	20:30	Knack Roeselare (Belgium)	3–2	(Germany) VfB Friedrichshafen	25–20	14–25	20–25	31–29	15–11	105–110	Report
10 Feb	19:00	Hebar Pazardzhik (Bulgaria)	1–3	(Poland) Jastrzębski Węgiel	28–26	23–25	19–25	16–25		86–101	Report
16 Feb	18:00	Jastrzębski Węgiel (Poland)	3–1	(Germany) VfB Friedrichshafen	25–18	23–25	25–15	25–23		98–81	Report
16 Feb	19:00	Knack Roeselare (Belgium)	2–3	(Bulgaria) Hebar Pazardzhik	25–23	25–21	20–25	22–25	14–16	106–110	Report
17 Feb	18:00	Hebar Pazardzhik (Bulgaria)	3–0	(Belgium) Knack Roeselare	25–21	26–24	25–20			76–65	Report

=== Pool B ===
Pos	Team	Pld	W	L	Pts	SW	SL	SR	SPW	SPL	SPR	Qualification
1	(Russia) Dynamo Moscow	6	6	0	17	18	2	9.000	481	371	1.296	Quarterfinals
2	(Turkey) Ziraat Bankası Ankara	6	3	3	10	11	11	1.000	475	479	0.992	
3	(Poland) Projekt Warsaw	6	2	4	7	10	14	0.714	510	537	0.950	
4	(Belgium) Greenyard Maaseik	6	1	5	2	5	17	0.294	443	522	0.849	

Source: CEV

Date	Time		Score		Set 1	Set 2	Set 3	Set 4	Set 5	Total	Report
1 Dec	19:00	Dynamo Moscow (Russia)	3–2	(Poland) Projekt Warsaw	20–25	21–25	25–20	25–16	15–12	106–98	Report
1 Dec	19:00	Ziraat Bankası Ankara (Turkey)	3–0	(Belgium) Greenyard Maaseik	26–24	25–15	25–17			76–56	Report
14 Dec	21:00	Greenyard Maaseik (Belgium)	0–3	(Russia) Dynamo Moscow	20–25	22–25	18–25			60–75	Report
15 Dec	20:30	Projekt Warsaw (Poland)	1–3	(Turkey) Ziraat Bankası Ankara	21–25	25–21	18–25	21–25		85–96	Report
13 Jan	19:00	Ziraat Bankası Ankara (Turkey)	0–3	(Russia) Dynamo Moscow	12–25	20–25	15–25			47–75	Report
25 Jan	19:00	Ziraat Bankası Ankara (Turkey)	3–1	(Poland) Projekt Warsaw	25–17	17–25	25–18	25–18		92–78	Report
26 Jan	19:00	Dynamo Moscow (Russia)	3–0	(Belgium) Greenyard Maaseik	25–16	25–15	25–18			75–49	Report
8 Feb	20:30	Greenyard Maaseik (Belgium)	3–2	(Turkey) Ziraat Bankası Ankara	25–19	23–25	25–21	22–25	15–13	110–103	Report
9 Feb	20:30	Projekt Warsaw (Poland)	0–3	(Russia) Dynamo Moscow	20–25	23–25	13–25			56–75	Report
15 Feb	19:00	Projekt Warsaw (Poland)	3–1	(Belgium) Greenyard Maaseik	25–23	22–25	25–20	25–22		97–90	Report
16 Feb	19:00	Dynamo Moscow (Russia)	3–0	(Turkey) Ziraat Bankası Ankara	25–20	25–20	25–21			75–61	Report
16 Feb	20:30	Greenyard Maaseik (Belgium)	1–3	(Poland) Projekt Warsaw	25–21	17–25	18–25	18–25		78–96	Report

=== Pool C ===
Pos	Team	Pld	W	L	Pts	SW	SL	SR	SPW	SPL	SPR	Qualification
1	(Italy) Cucine Lube Civitanova	6	5	1	15	17	6	2.833	531	457	1.162	Quarterfinals
2	(Poland) ZAKSA Kędzierzyn-Koźle	6	4	2	12	15	9	1.667	532	503	1.058	Quarterfinals
3	(Russia) Lokomotiv Novosibirsk	6	3	3	9	11	10	1.100	481	414	1.162	
4	(Slovenia) Merkur Maribor	6	0	6	0	0	18	0.000	281	451	0.623	

Source: CEV

Date	Time		Score		Set 1	Set 2	Set 3	Set 4	Set 5	Total	Report
1 Dec	19:30	ZAKSA Kędzierzyn-Koźle (Poland)	3–0	(Slovenia) Merkur Maribor	25–19	25–18	25–17			75–54	Report
1 Dec	20:00	Cucine Lube Civitanova (Italy)	3–0	(Russia) Lokomotiv Novosibirsk	25–17	25–20	25–15			75–52	Report
14 Dec	19:00	Lokomotiv Novosibirsk (Russia)	1–3	(Poland) ZAKSA Kędzierzyn-Koźle	19–25	25–21	24–26	23–25		91–97	Report
15 Dec	19:00	Merkur Maribor (Slovenia)	0–3	(Italy) Cucine Lube Civitanova	18–25	16–25	24–26			58–76	Report
11 Jan	19:00	Lokomotiv Novosibirsk (Russia)	3–0	(Slovenia) Merkur Maribor	25–0	25–0	25–0			75–0	Report
12 Jan	18:00	ZAKSA Kędzierzyn-Koźle (Poland)	2–3	(Italy) Cucine Lube Civitanova	17–25	25–16	18–25	25–22	12–15	97–103	Report
26 Jan	19:30	Cucine Lube Civitanova (Italy)	3–0	(Slovenia) Merkur Maribor	25–18	25–15	25–19			75–52	Report
8 Feb	19:00	Merkur Maribor (Slovenia)	0–3	(Poland) ZAKSA Kędzierzyn-Koźle	19–25	11–25	21–25			51–75	Report
9 Feb	19:00	Lokomotiv Novosibirsk (Russia)	1–3	(Italy) Cucine Lube Civitanova	25–21	23–25	22–25	20–25		90–96	Report
12 Feb	19:00	ZAKSA Kędzierzyn-Koźle (Poland)	1–3	(Russia) Lokomotiv Novosibirsk	18–25	25–23	17–25	20–25		80–98	Report
16 Feb	19:00	Merkur Maribor (Slovenia)	0–3	(Russia) Lokomotiv Novosibirsk	22–25	23–25	21–25			66–75	Report
16 Feb	20:30	Cucine Lube Civitanova (Italy)	2–3	(Poland) ZAKSA Kędzierzyn-Koźle	22–25	25–21	24–26	25–21	11–15	107–108	Report

=== Pool D ===
Pos	Team	Pld	W	L	Pts	SW	SL	SR	SPW	SPL	SPR	Qualification
1	(Germany) Berlin Recycling Volleys	6	6	0	16	18	5	3.600	541	430	1.258	Quarterfinals
2	(Russia) Zenit Saint Petersburg	6	3	3	11	13	9	1.444	504	461	1.093	Quarterfinals
3	(Portugal) Sport Lisboa e Benfica	6	2	4	5	7	15	0.467	397	510	0.778	
4	(Serbia) Vojvodina NS Seme Novi Sad	6	1	5	4	6	15	0.400	454	495	0.917	

Source: CEV

Date	Time		Score		Set 1	Set 2	Set 3	Set 4	Set 5	Total	Report
1 Dec	19:30	Zenit Saint Petersburg (Russia)	3–0	(Portugal) Sport Lisboa e Benfica	25–19	25–16	25–23			75–58	Report
1 Dec	19:30	Berlin Recycling Volleys (Germany)	3–0	(Serbia) Vojvodina NS Seme Novi Sad	26–24	25–16	25–21			76–61	Report
15 Dec	18:00	Vojvodina NS Seme Novi Sad (Serbia)	0–3	(Russia) Zenit Saint Petersburg	22–25	13–25	20–25			55–75	Report
15 Dec	17:00	Sport Lisboa e Benfica (Portugal)	1–3	(Germany) Berlin Recycling Volleys	19–25	16–25	25–15	19–25		79–90	Report
25 Jan	19:30	Zenit Saint Petersburg (Russia)	0–3	(Serbia) Vojvodina NS Seme Novi Sad	15–25	21–25	21–25			57–75	Report
26 Jan	19:30	Berlin Recycling Volleys (Germany)	3–0	(Portugal) Sport Lisboa e Benfica	25–0	25–0	25–0			75–0	Report
8 Feb	20:00	Sport Lisboa e Benfica (Portugal)	0–3	(Russia) Zenit Saint Petersburg	16–25	18–25	16–25			50–75	Report
9 Feb	18:00	Vojvodina NS Seme Novi Sad (Serbia)	0–3	(Germany) Berlin Recycling Volleys	25–27	20–25	23–25			68–77	Report
16 Feb	19:00	Vojvodina NS Seme Novi Sad (Serbia)	1–3	(Portugal) Sport Lisboa e Benfica	25–19	24–26	21–25	14–25		84–95	Report
16 Feb	19:30	Zenit Saint Petersburg (Russia)	2–3	(Germany) Berlin Recycling Volleys	26–24	25–20	25–27	22–25	12–15	110–111	Report
17 Feb	19:00	Sport Lisboa e Benfica (Portugal)	3–2	(Serbia) Vojvodina NS Seme Novi Sad	23–25	26–24	26–24	25–27	15–11	115–111	Report
17 Feb	19:30	Berlin Recycling Volleys (Germany)	3–2	(Russia) Zenit Saint Petersburg	21–25	25–21	21–25	28–26	17–15	112–112	Report

=== Pool E ===
Pos	Team	Pld	W	L	Pts	SW	SL	SR	SPW	SPL	SPR	Qualification
1	(Italy) Sir Sicoma Monini Perugia	6	6	0	18	18	0	MAX	453	305	1.485	Quarterfinals
2	(Italy) Itas Trentino	6	4	2	12	12	7	1.714	451	378	1.193	Quarterfinals
3	(Turkey) Fenerbahçe HDI İstanbul	6	2	4	5	6	14	0.429	421	463	0.909	
4	(France) AS Cannes Dragons	6	0	6	1	3	18	0.167	329	508	0.648	

Source: CEV

Date	Time		Score		Set 1	Set 2	Set 3	Set 4	Set 5	Total	Report
30 Nov	19:00	Fenerbahçe HDI İstanbul (Turkey)	3–0	(France) AS Cannes Dragons	28–26	25–21	25–22			78–69	Report
2 Dec	20:30	Sir Sicoma Monini Perugia (Italy)	3–0	(Italy) Itas Trentino	25–21	25–18	25–23			75–62	Report
15 Dec	19:30	AS Cannes Dragons (France)	0–3	(Italy) Sir Sicoma Monini Perugia	15–25	22–25	18–25			55–75	Report
16 Dec	20:30	Itas Trentino (Italy)	3–0	(Turkey) Fenerbahçe HDI İstanbul	25–21	25–22	25–17			75–60	Report
12 Jan	19:00	Fenerbahçe HDI İstanbul (Turkey)	0–3	(Italy) Sir Sicoma Monini Perugia	24–26	25–27	22–25			71–78	Report
13 Jan	20:30	Itas Trentino (Italy)	3–0	(France) AS Cannes Dragons	25–13	25–13	25–13			75–39	Report
26 Jan	19:00	Fenerbahçe HDI İstanbul (Turkey)	0–3	(Italy) Itas Trentino	20–25	18–25	16–25			54–75	Report
27 Jan	20:30	Sir Sicoma Monini Perugia (Italy)	3–0	(France) AS Cannes Dragons	25–0	25–0	25–0			75–0	Report
8 Feb	20:00	AS Cannes Dragons (France)	2–3	(Turkey) Fenerbahçe HDI İstanbul	19–25	25–19	25–19	13–25	9–15	91–103	Report
10 Feb	19:30	Itas Trentino (Italy)	0–3	(Italy) Sir Sicoma Monini Perugia	18–25	21–25	23–25			62–75	Report
16 Feb	19:30	AS Cannes Dragons (France)	1–3	(Italy) Itas Trentino	23–25	9–25	29–27	14–25		75–102	Report
16 Feb	20:30	Sir Sicoma Monini Perugia (Italy)	3–0	(Turkey) Fenerbahçe HDI İstanbul	25–17	25–21	25–17			75–55	Report

=== Second place ranking ===
Pos	Team	Pld	W	L	Pts	SW	SL	SR	SPW	SPL	SPR	Qualification
1	(Italy) Itas Trentino	6	4	2	12	12	7	1.714	451	378	1.193	Quarterfinals
2	(Poland) ZAKSA Kędzierzyn-Koźle	6	4	2	12	15	9	1.667	532	503	1.058	Quarterfinals
3	(Russia) Zenit Saint Petersburg	6	3	3	11	13	9	1.444	504	461	1.093	Quarterfinals
4	(Turkey) Ziraat Bankası Ankara	6	3	3	10	11	11	1.000	475	479	0.992	
5	(Bulgaria) Hebar Pazardzhik	6	3	3	7	10	13	0.769	418	509	0.821	

Source: CEV

== Quarterfinals ==
- The winners of the ties qualify for the semifinals.
- In case the teams are tied after two legs, a Golden Set is played immediately at the completion of the second leg.
- All times are local.

Pot 1	Pot 2
Sir Sicoma Monini Perugia; Jastrzębski Węgiel; Dynamo Moscow; Berlin Recycling Volleys	Cucine Lube Civitanova; Itas Trentino; ZAKSA Kędzierzyn-Koźle; Zenit Saint Petersburg

Team 1	Agg.	Team 2	1st leg	2nd leg
Zenit Saint Petersburg (Russia)	0–6 (Note: Dynamo Moscow and Zenit Saint Petersburg were excluded from further competition due to the Russian invasion of Ukraine. The teams of Sir Sicoma Monini Perugia and ZAKSA Kędzierzyn-Koźle claimed a 3–0 forfeit victory (25–0, 25–0, 25–0) and advanced to the semifinals.)	(Italy) Sir Sicoma Monini Perugia	W.O.	W.O.
Itas Trentino (Italy)	4–2	(Germany) Berlin Recycling Volleys	3–0	2–3
Cucine Lube Civitanova (Italy)	1–5	(Poland) Jastrzębski Węgiel	0–3	2–3
ZAKSA Kędzierzyn-Koźle (Poland)	6–0	(Russia) Dynamo Moscow	W.O.	W.O.

=== First leg ===
Date	Time		Score		Set 1	Set 2	Set 3	Set 4	Set 5	Total	Report
10 Mar	20:30	Itas Trentino (Italy)	3–0	(Germany) Berlin Recycling Volleys	27–25	25–19	25–22			77–66	Report
8 Mar	20:30	Cucine Lube Civitanova (Italy)	0–3	(Poland) Jastrzębski Węgiel	22–25	23–25	19–25			64–75	Report

=== Second leg ===
Date	Time		Score		Set 1	Set 2	Set 3	Set 4	Set 5	Total	Report
16 Mar	18:30	Berlin Recycling Volleys (Germany)	3–2	(Italy) Itas Trentino	25–21	25–22	9–25	21–25	15–13	95–106	Report
16 Mar	20:30	Jastrzębski Węgiel (Poland)	3–2	(Italy) Cucine Lube Civitanova	24–26	23–25	28–26	25–19	15–12	115–108	Report

== Semifinals ==
- The winners of the ties qualify for the final.
- In case the teams are tied after two legs, a Golden Set is played immediately at the completion of the second leg.
- All times are local.

Team 1	Agg.	Team 2	1st leg	2nd leg	Golden Set
Sir Sicoma Monini Perugia (Italy)	3–3	(Italy) Itas Trentino	2–3	3–2	15–17
Jastrzębski Węgiel (Poland)	1–5	(Poland) ZAKSA Kędzierzyn-Koźle	0–3	2–3	

=== First leg ===
Date	Time		Score		Set 1	Set 2	Set 3	Set 4	Set 5	Total	Report
30 Mar	20:30	Sir Sicoma Monini Perugia (Italy)	2–3	(Italy) Itas Trentino	23–25	25–19	23–25	30–28	12–15	113–112	Report
30 Mar	20:00	Jastrzębski Węgiel (Poland)	0–3	(Poland) ZAKSA Kędzierzyn-Koźle	20–25	14–25	19–25			53–75	Report

=== Second leg ===
Date	Time		Score		Set 1	Set 2	Set 3	Set 4	Set 5	Total	Report
7 Apr	20:30	Itas Trentino (Italy)	2–3	(Italy) Sir Sicoma Monini Perugia	25–21	21–25	25–16	20–25	13–15	104–102	Report
Golden set		Itas Trentino (Italy)	17–15	(Italy) Sir Sicoma Monini Perugia							
7 Apr	20:00	ZAKSA Kędzierzyn-Koźle (Poland)	3–2	(Poland) Jastrzębski Węgiel	25–15	25–21	24–26	21–25	15–11	110–98	Report

== Final ==
- Place: Ljubljana
- Time: Central European Summer Time (UTC+02:00).

Date	Time		Score		Set 1	Set 2	Set 3	Set 4	Set 5	Total	Report
22 May	21:00	Itas Trentino (Italy)	0–3	(Poland) ZAKSA Kędzierzyn-Koźle	22–25	20–25	30–32			72–82	Report

== Final standings ==
Qualified for the 2022 FIVB Club World Championship

Rank	Team
1st place, gold medalist(s)	(Poland) ZAKSA Kędzierzyn-Koźle
2nd place, silver medalist(s)	(Italy) Itas Trentino
Semifinalists	(Poland) Jastrzębski Węgiel (Italy) Sir Sicoma Monini Perugia

2021–22 CEV Champions League winners
(Poland)
ZAKSA Kędzierzyn-Koźle
2nd title
