= Polish Men's Volleyball SuperCup =

Annual competition for volleyball clubs in Poland

- Sport: Volleyball
- Founded: 2012
- No. of teams: 2
- Country: Poland
- Most recent champions: LKPS Lublin (2nd title)
- Most titles: Skra Bełchatów (4 titles)
- Broadcaster: Polsat Sport
- Website: Polish SuperCup

The Polish Men's Volleyball SuperCup is an annual competition for volleyball clubs in Poland played by the PlusLiga champions and Polish Cup winners. It is overseen by the Polish Volleyball Federation (Polish: Polski Związek Piłki Siatkowej) and the Professional Volleyball League SA (Polish: Profesjonalna Liga Piłki Siatkowej SA). The tournament was established in 2012 and takes place every year (except 2016) at the beginning of the new PlusLiga season.

== Winners ==
Year	Venue	Final
Year	Venue	Champion	Score	Runner–up
2012	Częstochowa	PGE Skra Bełchatów	3–0 (25:21, 25:23, 25:19)	Asseco Resovia
2013	Poznań	Asseco Resovia	3–2 (22:25, 25:19, 25:23, 21:25, 15:13)	ZAKSA Kędzierzyn-Koźle
2014	Poznań	PGE Skra Bełchatów	3–1 (26:24, 25:22, 20:25, 27:25)	ZAKSA Kędzierzyn-Koźle
2015	Poznań	Lotos Trefl Gdańsk	3–2 (25:23, 25:18, 23:25, 22:25, 15:12)	Asseco Resovia
2017	Bełchatów	PGE Skra Bełchatów	3–1 (16:25, 25:17, 35:33, 25:21)	ZAKSA Kędzierzyn-Koźle
2018	Gdańsk/Sopot	PGE Skra Bełchatów	3–0 (25:17, 25:20, 25:20)	Trefl Gdańsk
2019	Gliwice	ZAKSA Kędzierzyn-Koźle	3–1 (25:17, 34:32, 19:25, 25:23)	Projekt Warsaw
2020	Arłamów	ZAKSA Kędzierzyn-Koźle	3–1 (20:25, 25:14, 25:21, 25:19)	PGE Skra Bełchatów
2021	Lublin	Jastrzębski Węgiel	3–0 (25:18, 25:22, 30:28)	ZAKSA Kędzierzyn-Koźle
2022	Lublin	Jastrzębski Węgiel	3–2 (24:26, 25:23, 18:25, 25:20, 15:13)	ZAKSA Kędzierzyn-Koźle
2023	Katowice	ZAKSA Kędzierzyn-Koźle	3–2 (20:25, 24:26, 31:29, 25:19, 15:12)	Jastrzębski Węgiel
2024	Katowice	Aluron CMC Warta Zawiercie	3–2 (21:25, 25:21, 25:21, 19:25, 23:21)	Jastrzębski Węgiel
2025	Katowice	Bogdanka LUK Lublin	3–1 (28:26, 25:27, 25:16, 27:25)	Jastrzębski Węgiel
2026	Częstochowa	Bogdanka LUK Lublin	3–0 (34:32, 25:20, 25:18)	Aluron CMC Warta Zawiercie

== Total titles won ==
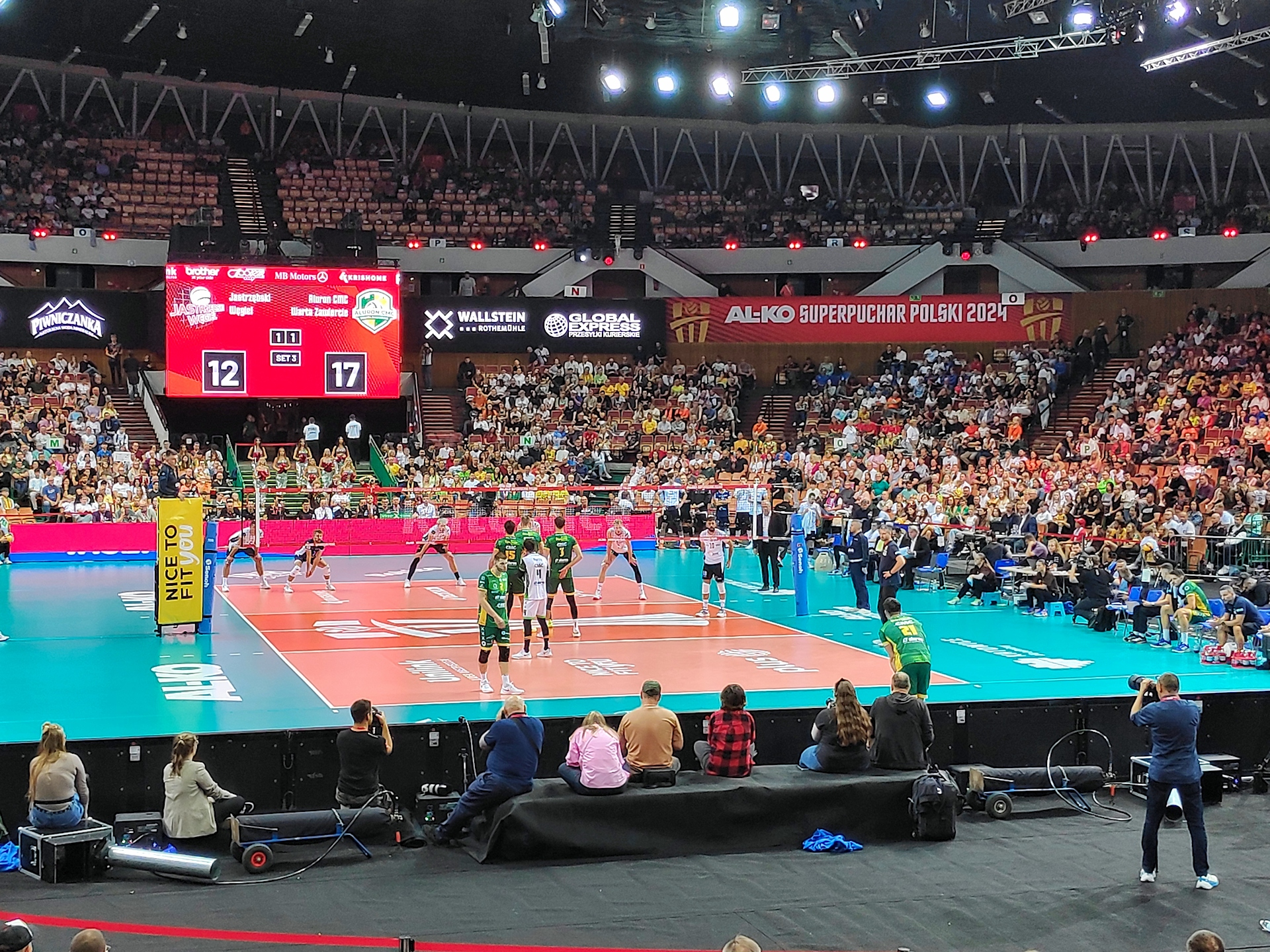
2024 SuperCup between Jastrzębski Węgiel and Warta Zawiercie

Club	Titles	Years
Skra Bełchatów	4	2012, 2014, 2017, 2018
ZAKSA Kędzierzyn-Koźle	3	2019, 2020, 2023
Jastrzębski Węgiel	2	2021, 2022
LKPS Lublin	2	2025, 2026
Resovia	1	2013
Trefl Gdańsk	1	2015
Warta Zawiercie	1	2024

== MVP by edition ==
- 2012 – Mariusz Wlazły (POL)
- 2013 – Dawid Konarski (POL)
- 2014 – Facundo Conte (ARG)
- 2015 – Mateusz Mika (POL)
- 2017 – Bartosz Bednorz (POL)
- 2018 – Mariusz Wlazły (POL)
- 2019 – Łukasz Kaczmarek (POL)
- 2020 – Aleksander Śliwka (POL)
- 2021 – Tomasz Fornal (POL)
- 2022 – Yuriy Gladyr (POL)
- 2023 – Bartosz Bednorz (POL)
- 2024 – Aaron Russell (USA)
- 2025 – Wilfredo León (POL)
- 2026 – Marcin Komenda (POL)

== See also ==
- Polish Men's Volleyball League
- Polish Men's Volleyball Cup
