= Volleyball at the 2020 Summer Olympics – Men's team rosters =

This article shows the roster of all participating teams for the men's indoor volleyball tournament at the 2020 Summer Olympics.

== Pool A ==
=== Canada ===
The Canada roster was announced on 30 June 2021.

Head coach: (Canada) Glenn Hoag

- 1 TJ Sanders S
- 2 Gord Perrin (c) OH
- 3 Steven Marshall OH
- 4 Nicholas Hoag OH
- 7 Stephen Maar OH
- 9 Jay Blankenau S
- 10 Ryan Sclater OP
- 12 Lucas Van Berkel MB
- 13 Sharone Vernon-Evans OP
- 17 Graham Vigrass MB
- 19 Blair Bann L
- 20 Arthur Szwarc MB

=== Iran ===
The Iran roster was announced on 11 July 2021.

Head coach: (Russia) Vladimir Alekno

- 2 Milad Ebadipour OH
- 4 Saeid Marouf (c) S
- 6 Mohammad Mousavi MB
- 9 Masoud Gholami MB
- 10 Amir Ghafour OP
- 11 Saber Kazemi OP
- 12 Morteza Sharifi OH
- 15 Ali Asghar Mojarrad MB
- 17 Meisam Salehi OH
- 19 Mehdi Marandi L
- 21 Arman Salehi L
- 24 Javad Karimi S

=== Italy ===
The Italy roster was announced on 21 June 2021.

Head coach: (Italy) Gianlorenzo Blengini

- 2 Jiří Kovář OH
- 4 Luca Vettori OP
- 5 Osmany Juantorena OH
- 6 Simone Giannelli S
- 9 Ivan Zaytsev (c) OP
- 11 Matteo Piano MB
- 13 Massimo Colaci L
- 14 Gianluca Galassi MB
- 15 Riccardo Sbertoli S
- 17 Simone Anzani MB
- 18 Alessandro Michieletto OH
- 19 Daniele Lavia OH

=== Japan ===
The Japan roster was announced on 21 June 2021.

Head coach: (Japan) Yuichi Nakagaichi

- 1 Kunihiro Shimizu OP
- 2 Taishi Onodera MB
- 3 Naonobu Fujii S
- 6 Akihiro Yamauchi MB
- 11 Yuji Nishida OP
- 12 Masahiro Sekita S
- 14 Yūki Ishikawa (c) OH
- 15 Haku Ri MB
- 17 Kenta Takanashi OH
- 19 Tatsunori Otsuka OH
- 20 Tomohiro Yamamoto L
- 21 Ran Takahashi OH

=== Poland ===
The Poland roster was announced on 27 June 2021.

Head coach: (Belgium) Vital Heynen

- 1 Piotr Nowakowski MB
- 5 Łukasz Kaczmarek OP
- 6 Bartosz Kurek OP
- 9 Wilfredo León OH
- 11 Fabian Drzyzga S
- 12 Grzegorz Łomacz S
- 13 Michał Kubiak (c) OH
- 14 Aleksander Śliwka OH
- 15 Jakub Kochanowski MB
- 16 Kamil Semeniuk OH
- 17 Paweł Zatorski L
- 20 Mateusz Bieniek MB

=== Venezuela ===
The Venezuela roster was announced on 2 July 2021.

Head coach: (Venezuela) Ronald Sarti

- 1 Armando Velásquez S
- 3 Fernando González OH
- 4 Héctor Mata L
- 5 Emerson Rodríguez OP
- 6 Robert Oramas MB
- 7 Edson Valencia MB
- 9 José Carrasco (c) S
- 11 José Verdi MB
- 14 Eliécer Canelo OH
- 15 Luis Arias OP
- 17 Ronald Fayola OH
- 19 Willner Rivas OH

== Pool B ==
=== Argentina ===
The Argentina roster was announced on 23 June 2021.

Head coach: (Argentina) Marcelo Méndez

- 1 Matías Sánchez S
- 2 Federico Pereyra OP
- 6 Cristian Poglajen OH
- 7 Facundo Conte OH
- 8 Agustín Loser MB
- 9 Santiago Danani L
- 11 Sebastián Solé MB
- 12 Bruno Lima OP
- 13 Ezequiel Palacios OH
- 15 Luciano De Cecco (c) S
- 17 Nicolás Méndez OH
- 18 Martín Ramos MB

=== Brazil ===
The Brazil roster was announced on 27 June 2021.

Head coach: (Brazil) Renan Dal Zotto

- 1 Bruno Rezende (c) S
- 5 Maurício Borges Silva OH
- 6 Fernando Kreling S
- 8 Wallace de Souza OP
- 9 Yoandy Leal OH
- 12 Isac Santos MB
- 13 Maurício Souza MB
- 14 Douglas Souza OH
- 16 Lucas Saatkamp MB
- 17 Thales Hoss L
- 18 Ricardo Lucarelli OH
- 21 Alan Souza OP

=== France ===
The France roster was announced on 18 June 2021.

Head coach: (France) Laurent Tillie

- 1 Barthélémy Chinenyeze MB
- 2 Jenia Grebennikov L
- 4 Jean Patry OP
- 6 Benjamin Toniutti (c) S
- 7 Kevin Tillie OH
- 9 Earvin N'Gapeth OH
- 11 Antoine Brizard S
- 12 Stephen Boyer OP
- 14 Nicolas Le Goff MB
- 16 Daryl Bultor MB
- 17 Trévor Clévenot OH
- 19 Yacine Louati OH

=== ROC ===
The ROC roster was announced on 1 July 2021.

Head coach: (Finland) Tuomas Sammelvuo

- 1 Yaroslav Podlesnykh OH
- 4 Artem Volvich MB
- 7 Dmitry Volkov OH
- 9 Ivan Iakovlev MB
- 10 Denis Bogdan OH
- 11 Pavel Pankov S
- 15 Viktor Poletaev OP
- 17 Maxim Mikhaylov OP
- 18 Egor Kliuka OH
- 20 Ilyas Kurkaev MB
- 24 Igor Kobzar (c) S
- 27 Valentin Golubev L

=== Tunisia ===
The following is the Tunisia roster.

Head coach: (Italy) Antonio Giacobbe

- 2 Ahmed Kadhi MB
- 3 Khaled Ben Slimene S
- 6 Mohamed Ali Ben Othmen Miladi OH
- 7 Elyes Karamosli OH
- 9 Omar Agrebi MB
- 10 Hamza Nagga OP
- 11 Ismaïl Moalla OH
- 12 Mehdi Ben Cheikh (c) S
- 13 Selim Mbareki MB
- 15 Wassim Ben Tara OP
- 19 Aymen Bouguerra OH
- 20 Saddem Hmissi L

=== United States ===
The United States roster was announced on 14 June 2021.

Head coach: (United States) John Speraw

- 1 Matt Anderson OP
- 3 Taylor Sander OH
- 5 Kyle Ensing OP
- 6 Mitch Stahl MB
- 7 Kawika Shoji S
- 8 TJ DeFalco OH
- 11 Micah Christenson (c) S
- 12 Maxwell Holt MB
- 17 Thomas Jaeschke OH
- 18 Garrett Muagututia OH
- 20 David Smith MB
- 22 Erik Shoji L
