= Tuomas Sammelvuo =

Finnish volleyball player and coach

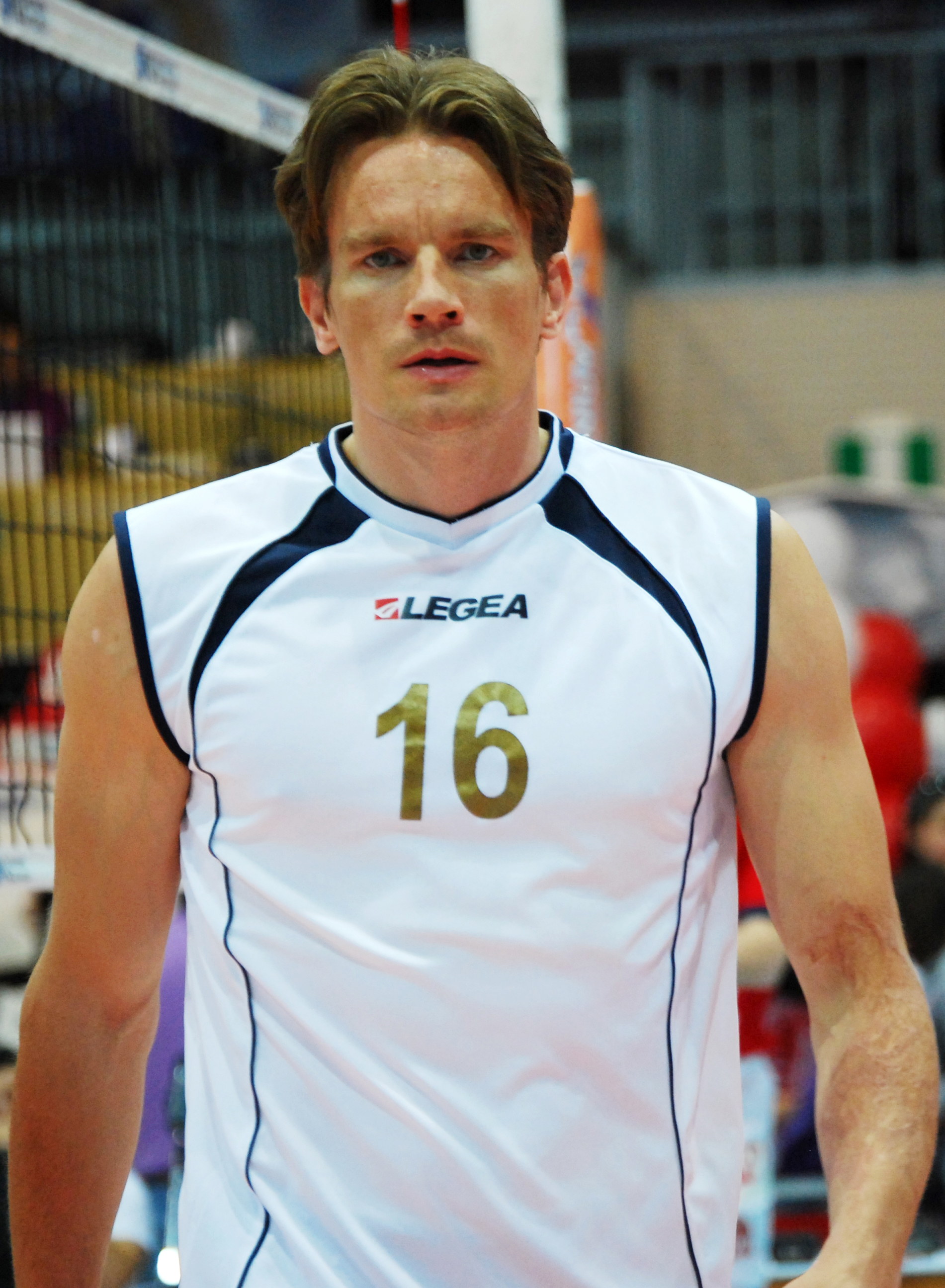
- Sammelvuo in 2012

Personal information
- Full name: Tuomas Petteri Sammelvuo
- Nickname: Köpi
- Born: 16 February 1976 (age 50); Pudasjärvi, Finland
- Height: 1.93 m (6 ft 4 in)

Coaching information
- Current team: Osaka Bluteon
Previous teams coached
Years	Teams
2013–2019; 2016–2019; 2019–2022; 2019–2022; 2022–2024; 2022–2024; 2024–2025; 2025–	Finland; Kuzbass Kemerovo; Russia; Zenit Saint Petersburg; ZAKSA Kędzierzyn-Koźle; Canada; Asseco Resovia; Osaka Bluteon

Volleyball information
- Position: Outside hitter

Career
Years	Teams
1993–1994; 1994–1997; 1997–1998; 1998–2000; 2000–2002; 2002–2003; 2003–2005; 2005–2006; 2006–2008; 2008–2009; 2009–2010; 2010–2011; 2011–2012; 2012–2013	Raision Loimu; KuPS Kuopio; Strasbourg VB; Stade Poitevin Poitiers; Piemonte Volley; Copra Ventaglio Piacenza; Tours VB; Toyoda Gosei Trefuerza; Dynamo Kaliningrad; Tonno Callipo Vibo Valentia; ZAKSA Kędzierzyn-Koźle; Lokomotiv Novosibirsk; Umbria Volley; Lokomotiv Novosibirsk

National team
1993–2010	Finland (296)
Honours
Head coach Russia
Olympic Games
Silver medal – second place	2020 Tokyo
FIVB Nations League
Gold medal – first place	2019 Chicago
Head coach Canada
NORCECA Championship
Silver medal – second place	2023 Charleston

Tuomas Petteri Sammelvuo (born 16 February 1976) is a Finnish volleyball coach and former player. He is the head coach of Osaka Bluteon in the Japanese SV.League, a post he has held since June 2025.

As a player, Sammelvuo won the 2004–05 CEV Champions League with Tours VB and remains the only Finnish man to have done so. As a coach, he led the Russian national team to the silver medal at the 2020 Tokyo Olympics, and in 2023 he won the Champions League again, this time with ZAKSA Kędzierzyn-Koźle — making him the first Finn to win the competition both as a player and as a head coach. He played 296 matches for Finland, the second-most in the team's history.

== Personal life ==
He speaks six languages: Finnish, French, English, Italian, Polish and Russian.

From his first marriage to Petra, he has two children: a son and a daughter. In 2024, his second wife, Alina, gave birth to a daughter, Lilianne.

== Playing career ==
=== Early years ===
Sammelvuo started playing volleyball in his home town of Pudasjärvi, in northern Finland, alongside his sister and two brothers. He moved to Tampere at sixteen to attend a sports school, and around the same time was called up to Finland's junior national team, which finished fourth at the 1995 World Championship.

=== Clubs ===
Sammelvuo signed his first professional contract in 1993 with Raision Loimu, winning a bronze medal at the Finnish championship. He then spent three seasons with KuPS Kuopio, winning the Finnish league twice and finishing runner-up once.

In 1997 he moved to France, playing first for Strasbourg VB and then for Stade Poitevin Poitiers, with whom he won the French championship. He spent the next three seasons in Italy, with Cuneo and then Piacenza. It was during the 2001–02 season, while still at Cuneo, that he won the Italian Cup and the CEV Challenge Cup — a detail sometimes misattributed to his following club, Piacenza, in secondary sources. (Note: Cuneo's Italian Cup and CEV Challenge Cup wins of the 2001–02 season are documented in the official Lega Pallavolo Serie A player database, which lists them under Noicom Brebanca Cuneo rather than Piacenza.)

He returned to France in 2003, joining Tours VB. In his first season there he won the French championship and reached the Champions League semi-final, losing to the eventual winner, Lokomotiv Belgorod. The following season, 2004–05, Tours won the Champions League outright, and Sammelvuo became the first Finnish man to win the trophy.

In 2005 he moved to Japan to play for Toyoda Gosei Trefuerza, the first Finnish volleyball player to appear in the Japanese league, and was named to the league's symbolic best-team selection. From 2006 to 2008 he played in Russia for Dynamo Kaliningrad, finishing among the league's top scorers and being named the league's third-best player in the 2006–07 season.

He spent the 2008–09 season with Tonno Callipo Vibo Valentia in Italy, then signed for ZAKSA Kędzierzyn-Koźle in Poland for 2009–10. A move to Lokomotiv Novosibirsk in Russia followed for the 2010–11 season, during which he won the Russian Cup, becoming the first Finn to do so. A serious knee injury forced him to cut short a second contract with the club in early 2011; he spent part of that season recovering in Finland as an assistant coach at Pielaveden Sampo. He returned to Italy that autumn for a short spell at Umbria Volley, then went back to Lokomotiv Novosibirsk for 2012–13, combining a playing role with his first coaching work, in the club's second team. His contract with Lokomotiv was ended by mutual agreement in February 2013 after Finland appointed him as national team head coach; he had already made his last national-team appearance on 17 July 2012, in a Nations League match against Canada.

=== National team ===
Sammelvuo was called up to the Finland national team for seventeen years. He was made captain in 1997 and held the role for the rest of his playing career. Finland's best result under his captaincy came in 2007, when the team finished fourth at the European Championship. He won 296 caps in total, second in the team's history only to Kari Kalin (312).

== Coaching career ==
Sammelvuo was appointed head coach of the Finland men's national volleyball team in January 2013, on a "2+2" year contract, shortly after retiring as a player. At the 2013 European Championship, Finland finished third in their pool, advanced to the quarter-finals through an additional play-off round, and lost there to Italy 1–3, finishing eighth overall.

In 2014, Finland reached the top ten at a World Championship for the first time, finishing ninth in Poland; Sammelvuo was named Finland's coach of the year for it. He also took Finland to the 2018 World Championship and the 2015 and 2017 European Championships.

On 15 May 2016 he additionally signed with Kuzbass Kemerovo in Russia, combining the job with the Finland post. Kuzbass reached fourth place in 2017–18, the club's best finish to date, and the following season won its first ever Russian championship, beating five-time defending champions Zenit Kazan 3–1 in the final.

He was appointed head coach of the Russia men's national volleyball team on 1 March 2019. Russia won the 2019 Nations League under him, beating the United States in the final, but the defending champions were knocked out in the quarter-finals of the 2019 European Championship by hosts Slovenia. At the pandemic-delayed 2020 Tokyo Olympics, Russia reached the final under Sammelvuo and lost a five-set match to France, taking the silver medal.

He was also appointed head coach of Zenit Saint Petersburg on 4 September 2019. Zenit finished fifth in his first season and lost the Russian Cup final; in 2020–21 the club lost three finals in a row — the Russian championship, the CEV Cup and the Russian Cup, all to Dinamo Moscow — and in 2021–22 it missed out on both the Russian Cup and Super Cup. His departure from Zenit was announced on 25 February 2022, and his contract with the Russian federation, which had been due to end in 2021, was not renewed after Russian teams were suspended from international competition amid the conflict in Ukraine.

He then took charge of ZAKSA Kędzierzyn-Koźle in Poland on 1 August 2022. In 2022–23 the club won the Polish Cup, beating Jastrzębski Węgiel 3–0 in the final, and went on to win the Champions League, defeating the same opponents 3–2 in the final in Turin — the win that made him the first Finn to win the competition as both player and coach. ZAKSA also reached the PlusLiga final that season but lost it 1–3 to Jastrzębski Węgiel. He was dismissed in January 2024 after a poor first half of the 2023–24 season.

From November 2022 to November 2024 he simultaneously coached the Canada men's national volleyball team, taking it to the Nations League Final Eight (sixth place) and, in 2023, to the NORCECA Championship final, where Canada took silver behind the United States. Canada also qualified for the 2024 Paris Olympics, where it finished last in its group, losing to Slovenia (1–3), France (0–3) and Serbia (2–3).

While still under contract with Canada, Sammelvuo was announced as head coach of the Polish club Asseco Resovia for the 2024–25 season on 25 June 2024, briefly holding both jobs at once. He left Canada on 22 November 2024, with the federation citing the birth of his child. At Resovia, the reigning CEV Cup holders, he took the club back to the final of the 2024–25 competition, which it lost over two legs to Turkish side Ziraat Bankası Ankara — 2–3 at home in Rzeszów and 1–3 away in Ankara — with American Matthew Anderson named final MVP.

Sammelvuo was announced as head coach of Osaka Bluteon in Japan's SV.League on 12 June 2025, succeeding Laurent Tillie; French setter Antoine Brizard joined the club at the same time. His contract runs for four seasons, through 2028–29. In his first season in charge, Osaka Bluteon won the 2025–26 SV.League title, coming back from a first-match loss to defending champions Suntory Sunbirds Osaka to win the final series 2–1, with the decider won 3–0 in Yokohama.

== Honours ==
=== As a player ===
- CEV Champions League
  - 2004–05 – with Tours VB
- CEV Challenge Cup
  - 2001–02 – with Noicom Cuneo
- Domestic
  - 1994–95 Finnish Cup, with KuPS Kuopio
  - 1994–95 Finnish Championship, with KuPS Kuopio
  - 1995–96 Finnish Cup, with KuPS Kuopio
  - 1995–96 Finnish Championship, with KuPS Kuopio
  - 1998–99 French Championship, with Stade Poitevin Poitiers
  - 2001–02 Italian Cup, with Noicom Brebanca Cuneo
  - 2003–04 French Championship, with Tours VB
  - 2004–05 French Cup, with Tours VB
  - 2010–11 Russian Cup, with Lokomotiv Novosibirsk

=== As a coach ===
- CEV Champions League
  - 2022–23 – with ZAKSA Kędzierzyn-Koźle
- CEV Cup
  - 2020–21 – with Zenit Saint Petersburg
  - 2024–25 – with Asseco Resovia
- Domestic
  - 2018–19 Russian Championship, with Kuzbass Kemerovo
  - 2022–23 Polish Cup, with ZAKSA Kędzierzyn-Koźle
  - 2023–24 Polish SuperCup, with ZAKSA Kędzierzyn-Koźle
  - 2025–26 SV.League, with Osaka Bluteon

=== Individual awards ===
- 2014: Coach of the year in Finland
- 2021: Coach of the year in Finland
- 2023: Coach of the year in Finland
