= Volleyball at the 2024 Summer Olympics – Men's tournament =

Mens event at the 2024 Summer Olympics

Men's volleyball at the Games of the XXXIII Olympiad
- Venue: South Paris Arena
- Date: 27 July – 10 August
- Competitors: 144 from 12 nations

Medalists
1st place, gold medalist(s)		France (2nd title)
2nd place, silver medalist(s)		Poland
3rd place, bronze medalist(s)		United States

The men's tournament in volleyball at the 2024 Summer Olympics was the 16th edition of the event at the Summer Olympics, organised by the world's governing body, the FIVB, in conjunction with the IOC. It was held in Paris, France from 27 July to 10 August 2024. This was the first time in the history of the Olympic volleyball competition, each team participating was entitled to include one non-competing (AP) athlete to replace an athlete for medical reasons.

France won its second straight title by defeating Poland (3–0) in the gold medal match. The United States defeated Italy (3–0) in the bronze medal match.

== Competition schedule ==
The match schedule was announced on 2 July 2024.

P	Preliminary round	¼	Quarterfinals	½	Semifinals	B	Bronze medal match	F	Final

Sat 27	Sun 28	Mon 29	Tue 30	Wed 31	Thu 1	Fri 2	Sat 3	Sun 4	Mon 5	Tue 6	Wed 7	Thu 8	Fri 9	Sat 10
P	P		P	P		P	P		¼		½		B	F

== Qualification ==
Qualification		Date	Venue	Berths	Qualified team
Host nation		—N/a		1	France
FIVB Olympic Qualification Tournaments	Pool A	30 September – 8 October 2023	(Brazil) Rio de Janeiro	2	Germany
FIVB Olympic Qualification Tournaments	Pool A	30 September – 8 October 2023	(Brazil) Rio de Janeiro	2	Brazil
FIVB Olympic Qualification Tournaments	Pool B	30 September – 8 October 2023	(Japan) Tokyo	2	United States
FIVB Olympic Qualification Tournaments	Pool B	30 September – 8 October 2023	(Japan) Tokyo	2	Japan
FIVB Olympic Qualification Tournaments	Pool C	30 September – 8 October 2023	(China) Xi'an	2	Poland
FIVB Olympic Qualification Tournaments	Pool C	30 September – 8 October 2023	(China) Xi'an	2	Canada
World Ranking qualification pathway		24 June 2024	—N/a	5	Slovenia
World Ranking qualification pathway		24 June 2024	—N/a	5	Italy
World Ranking qualification pathway		24 June 2024	—N/a	5	Argentina
World Ranking qualification pathway		24 June 2024	—N/a	5	Serbia
World Ranking qualification pathway		24 June 2024	—N/a	5	Egypt
Total				12	

== Format ==
In a change of format compared to the previous nine editions of the Olympic Games, this tournament featured three groups with four teams each during the preliminary round (between 1972 Summer Olympics to 2020 Summer Olympics the teams were placed in two groups). At this round, the teams competed in a single round-robin format. The two highest ranked teams in each pool and the best two third-placed teams advanced to the knockout stage (quarterfinals).

The knockout stage followed the single-elimination format. The match-ups were determined by teams combined ranking system, #1 vs #8 (QF1), #2 vs #7 (QF2), #3 vs #6 (QF3), #4 vs #5 (QF4). The winners advanced to semifinals, QF1 vs QF4, QF3 vs QF2. The losers competed for bronze medals and the winners for gold medals.

== Draw ==
The twelve qualified teams were seeded according to their position in the FIVB World Ranking as of 24 June 2024. As the host team, France was seeded first and placed in the top position of Pool A. The two top ranked teams seeded second and third were placed at the top of Pools B and C respectively. The remaining nine teams were distributed across three bowls of three teams each based on their position in the World Ranking and drawn for their seed line by line applying the serpentine system. The draw took place on 26 June 2024. Rankings are shown in brackets except the hosts who ranked seventh.

=== Seeding ===
Seeded teams	Pot 1	Pot 2	Pot 3
France (Hosts); Poland (1); Japan (2)	Slovenia (3); Italy (4); United States (5)	Brazil (6); Argentina (8); Canada (9)	Serbia (10); Germany (11); Egypt (19)

=== Pools composition ===
Pool A	Pool B	Pool C
France	Poland	Japan
Slovenia	Italy	United States
Canada	Brazil	Argentina
Serbia	Egypt	Germany

== Pool standing procedure and teams combined ranking system ==
Pool standing procedure
In order to establish the ranking of teams after the group stage, the following criteria was implemented:

1. Number of matches won
2. Match points
3. Sets ratio
4. Points ratio
5. Result of the last match between the tied teams

Match won 3–0 or 3–1: 3 match points for the winner, 0 match points for the loser
Match won 3–2: 2 match points for the winner, 1 match point for the loser

Teams combined ranking system
In order to determine teams playing in quarterfinals and their match-ups:

1. Pool Position
2. Number of matches won
3. Match points
4. Sets ratio
5. Points ratio
6. Head-to-head
7. World ranking

== Referees ==
The following referees were selected for the tournament.

- (Argentina) Karina Rene
- (Brazil) Angela Grass
- (Bulgaria) Ivaylo Ivanov
- (Canada) Scott Dziewirz
- (China) Wang Ziling
- (Dominican Republic) Denny Cespedes
- (Egypt) Wael Kandil
- (France) Fabrice Collados
- (Greece) Epaminondas Gerothodoros
- (Italy) Stefano Cesare
- (Japan) Sumie Myoi
- (Poland) Wojciech Maroszek
- (Slovakia) Juraj Mokrý
- (Switzerland) Vladimir Simonović
- (Turkey) Nurper Özbar
- (United Arab Emirates) Hamid Al-Rousi

== Preliminary round ==
- All times are Central European Summer Time (UTC+02:00).

=== Pool A ===
Pos	Team	Pld	W	L	Pts	SW	SL	SR	SPW	SPL	SPR	Qualification
1	Slovenia	3	3	0	8	9	3	3.000	282	252	1.119	Quarterfinals
2	France (H)	3	2	1	6	8	5	1.600	290	260	1.115	Quarterfinals
3	Serbia	3	1	2	3	5	8	0.625	256	293	0.874	
4	Canada	3	0	3	1	3	9	0.333	254	277	0.917	

Source: Olympics
Rules for classification: Tiebreakers
(H) Host

28 July 2024; 17:00	France	3–2	Serbia	South Paris Arena 1, Paris; Attendance: 9,372; Referees: Juraj Mokrý (SVK), Hamid Al-Rousi (UAE)
28 July 2024; 17:00	(23–25, 25–17, 25–17, 21–25, 15–6); P2 Report			South Paris Arena 1, Paris; Attendance: 9,372; Referees: Juraj Mokrý (SVK), Hamid Al-Rousi (UAE)

28 July 2024; 21:00	Slovenia	3–1	Canada	South Paris Arena 1, Paris; Attendance: 9,381; Referees: Wojciech Maroszek (POL), Wael Kandil (EGY)
28 July 2024; 21:00	(25–21, 25–20, 20–25, 25–21); P2 Report			South Paris Arena 1, Paris; Attendance: 9,381; Referees: Wojciech Maroszek (POL), Wael Kandil (EGY)

30 July 2024; 17:00	Slovenia	3–0	Serbia	South Paris Arena 1, Paris; Attendance: 9,138; Referees: Denny Cespedes (DOM), Stefano Cesare (ITA)
30 July 2024; 17:00	(25–21, 25–19, 25–19); P2 Report			South Paris Arena 1, Paris; Attendance: 9,138; Referees: Denny Cespedes (DOM), Stefano Cesare (ITA)

30 July 2024; 21:00	France	3–0	Canada	South Paris Arena 1, Paris; Attendance: 9,365; Referees: Ivaylo Ivanov (BUL), Epaminondas Gerothodoros (GRE)
30 July 2024; 21:00	(25–20, 25–21, 25–17); P2 Report			South Paris Arena 1, Paris; Attendance: 9,365; Referees: Ivaylo Ivanov (BUL), Epaminondas Gerothodoros (GRE)

2 August 2024; 17:00	France	2–3	Slovenia	South Paris Arena 1, Paris; Attendance: 9,505; Referees: Vladimir Simonović (SUI), Wojciech Maroszek (POL)
2 August 2024; 17:00	(20–25, 23–25, 27–25, 25–22, 11–15); P2 Report			South Paris Arena 1, Paris; Attendance: 9,505; Referees: Vladimir Simonović (SUI), Wojciech Maroszek (POL)

3 August 2024; 21:00	Canada	2–3	Serbia	South Paris Arena 1, Paris; Attendance: 9,398; Referees: Stefano Cesare (ITA), Epaminondas Gerothodoros (GRE)
3 August 2024; 21:00	(25–16, 25–22, 24–26, 19–25, 16–18); P2 Report			South Paris Arena 1, Paris; Attendance: 9,398; Referees: Stefano Cesare (ITA), Epaminondas Gerothodoros (GRE)

=== Pool B ===
Pos	Team	Pld	W	L	Pts	SW	SL	SR	SPW	SPL	SPR	Qualification
1	Italy	3	3	0	9	9	2	4.500	269	224	1.201	Quarterfinals
2	Poland	3	2	1	5	7	5	1.400	260	256	1.016	Quarterfinals
3	Brazil	3	1	2	4	6	6	1.000	273	241	1.133	Quarterfinals
4	Egypt	3	0	3	0	0	9	0.000	144	225	0.640	

Source: Olympics
Rules for classification: Tiebreakers

27 July 2024; 13:00	Italy	3–1	Brazil	South Paris Arena 1, Paris; Attendance: 9,485; Referees: Vladimir Simonovic (SUI), Scott Dziewirz (CAN)
27 July 2024; 13:00	(25–23, 27–25, 18–25, 25–21); P2 Report			South Paris Arena 1, Paris; Attendance: 9,485; Referees: Vladimir Simonovic (SUI), Scott Dziewirz (CAN)

27 July 2024; 17:00	Poland	3–0	Egypt	South Paris Arena 1, Paris; Attendance: 9,408; Referees: Epaminondas Gerothodoros (GRE), Ivaylo Ivanov (BUL)
27 July 2024; 17:00	(25–21, 25–19, 25–13); P2 Report			South Paris Arena 1, Paris; Attendance: 9,408; Referees: Epaminondas Gerothodoros (GRE), Ivaylo Ivanov (BUL)

30 July 2024; 09:00	Italy	3–0	Egypt	South Paris Arena 1, Paris; Attendance: 9,415; Referees: Hamid Al-Rousi (UAE), Wojciech Maroszek (POL)
30 July 2024; 09:00	(25–15, 25–16, 25–20); P2 Report			South Paris Arena 1, Paris; Attendance: 9,415; Referees: Hamid Al-Rousi (UAE), Wojciech Maroszek (POL)

31 July 2024; 09:00	Poland	3–2	Brazil	South Paris Arena 1, Paris; Attendance: 9,464; Referees: Stefano Cesare (ITA), Denny Cespedes (DOM)
31 July 2024; 09:00	(22–25, 25–19, 19–25, 25–23, 15–12); P2 Report			South Paris Arena 1, Paris; Attendance: 9,464; Referees: Stefano Cesare (ITA), Denny Cespedes (DOM)

2 August 2024; 13:00	Brazil	3–0	Egypt	South Paris Arena 1, Paris; Attendance: 9,407; Referees: Scott Dziewirz (CAN), Wang Ziling (CHN)
2 August 2024; 13:00	(25–11, 25–13, 25–16); P2 Report			South Paris Arena 1, Paris; Attendance: 9,407; Referees: Scott Dziewirz (CAN), Wang Ziling (CHN)

3 August 2024; 17:00	Poland	1–3	Italy	South Paris Arena 1, Paris; Attendance: 9,441; Referees: Juraj Mokrý (SVK), Denny Cespedes (DOM)
3 August 2024; 17:00	(15–25, 18–25, 26–24, 20–25); P2 Report			South Paris Arena 1, Paris; Attendance: 9,441; Referees: Juraj Mokrý (SVK), Denny Cespedes (DOM)

=== Pool C ===
Pos	Team	Pld	W	L	Pts	SW	SL	SR	SPW	SPL	SPR	Qualification
1	United States	3	3	0	8	9	3	3.000	270	232	1.164	Quarterfinals
2	Germany	3	2	1	6	8	5	1.600	287	264	1.087	Quarterfinals
3	Japan	3	1	2	4	6	7	0.857	278	292	0.952	Quarterfinals
4	Argentina	3	0	3	0	1	9	0.111	196	243	0.807	

Source: Olympics
Rules for classification: Tiebreakers

27 July 2024; 09:00	Japan	2–3	Germany	South Paris Arena 1, Paris; Attendance: 9,897; Referees: Fabrice Collados (FRA), Denny Cespedes (DOM)
27 July 2024; 09:00	(17–25, 25–23, 25–20, 28–30, 12–15); P2 Report			South Paris Arena 1, Paris; Attendance: 9,897; Referees: Fabrice Collados (FRA), Denny Cespedes (DOM)

27 July 2024; 21:00	United States	3–0	Argentina	South Paris Arena 1, Paris; Attendance: 9,464; Referees: Stefano Cesare (ITA), Wojciech Maroszek (POL)
27 July 2024; 21:00	(25–20, 25–19, 25–16); P2 Report			South Paris Arena 1, Paris; Attendance: 9,464; Referees: Stefano Cesare (ITA), Wojciech Maroszek (POL)

30 July 2024; 13:00	United States	3–2	Germany	South Paris Arena 1, Paris; Attendance: 9,275; Referees: Scott Dziewirz (CAN), Vladimir Simonović (SUI)
30 July 2024; 13:00	(25–21, 25–17, 17–25, 20–25, 15–11); P2 Report			South Paris Arena 1, Paris; Attendance: 9,275; Referees: Scott Dziewirz (CAN), Vladimir Simonović (SUI)

31 July 2024; 13:00	Japan	3–1	Argentina	South Paris Arena 1, Paris; Attendance: 9,474; Referees: Wojciech Maroszek (POL), Vladimir Simonović (SUI)
31 July 2024; 13:00	(25–16, 25–22, 18–25, 25–23); P2 Report			South Paris Arena 1, Paris; Attendance: 9,474; Referees: Wojciech Maroszek (POL), Vladimir Simonović (SUI)

2 August 2024; 09:00	Argentina	0–3	Germany	South Paris Arena 1, Paris; Attendance: 9,455; Referees: Fabrice Collados (FRA), Hamid Al-Rousi (UAE)
2 August 2024; 09:00	(13–25, 21–25, 21–25); P2 Report			South Paris Arena 1, Paris; Attendance: 9,455; Referees: Fabrice Collados (FRA), Hamid Al-Rousi (UAE)

2 August 2024; 21:00	Japan	1–3	United States	South Paris Arena 1, Paris; Attendance: 9,369; Referees: Ivaylo Ivanov (BUL), Juraj Mokrý (SVK)
2 August 2024; 21:00	(16–25, 18–25, 25–18, 19–25); P2 Report			South Paris Arena 1, Paris; Attendance: 9,369; Referees: Ivaylo Ivanov (BUL), Juraj Mokrý (SVK)

=== Combined ranking ===
Pos	Pool	Team	Pld	W	L	Pts	SW	SL	SR	SPW	SPL	SPR	Notes
1	B	Italy	3	3	0	9	9	2	4.500	269	224	1.201	First in each of the pools
2	C	United States	3	3	0	8	9	3	3.000	270	232	1.164	First in each of the pools
3	A	Slovenia	3	3	0	8	9	3	3.000	282	252	1.119	First in each of the pools
4	A	France (H)	3	2	1	6	8	5	1.600	290	260	1.115	Second in each of the pools
5	C	Germany	3	2	1	6	8	5	1.600	287	264	1.087	Second in each of the pools
6	B	Poland	3	2	1	5	7	5	1.400	260	256	1.016	Second in each of the pools
7	B	Brazil	3	1	2	4	6	6	1.000	273	241	1.133	Third in each of the pools
8	C	Japan	3	1	2	4	6	7	0.857	278	292	0.952	Third in each of the pools
9	A	Serbia	3	1	2	3	5	8	0.625	256	293	0.874	Third in the pool
10	A	Canada	3	0	3	1	3	9	0.333	254	277	0.917	Fourth in each of the pools
11	C	Argentina	3	0	3	0	1	9	0.111	196	243	0.807	Fourth in each of the pools
12	B	Egypt	3	0	3	0	0	9	0.000	144	225	0.640	Fourth in each of the pools

Source: Olympics
Rules for classification: Tiebreakers
(H) Host

== Knockout stage ==
=== Bracket ===
Quarterfinals
5 August
Italy	3
Japan	2
5 August
France	3
Germany	2
5 August
Slovenia	1
Poland	3
5 August
United States	3
Brazil	1

Semifinals
7 August
Italy	0
France	3
7 August
Poland	3
United States	2

Gold medal match
10 August
France	3
Poland	0
Bronze medal match
9 August
Italy	0
United States	3

=== Quarterfinals ===
5 August 2024; 09:00	Slovenia	1–3	Poland	South Paris Arena 1, Paris; Attendance: 9,274; Referees: Scott Dziewirz (CAN), Stefano Cesare (ITA)
5 August 2024; 09:00	(20–25, 26–24, 19–25, 20–25); P2 Report			South Paris Arena 1, Paris; Attendance: 9,274; Referees: Scott Dziewirz (CAN), Stefano Cesare (ITA)

5 August 2024; 13:00	Italy	3–2	Japan	South Paris Arena 1, Paris; Attendance: 9,166; Referees: Ivaylo Ivanov (BUL), Wojciech Maroszek (POL)
5 August 2024; 13:00	(20–25, 23–25, 27–25, 26–24, 17–15); P2 Report			South Paris Arena 1, Paris; Attendance: 9,166; Referees: Ivaylo Ivanov (BUL), Wojciech Maroszek (POL)

5 August 2024; 17:00	France	3–2	Germany	South Paris Arena 1, Paris; Attendance: 9,405; Referees: Juraj Mokrý (SVK), Denny Cespedes (DOM)
5 August 2024; 17:00	(18–25, 26–28, 25–20, 25–21, 15–13); P2 Report			South Paris Arena 1, Paris; Attendance: 9,405; Referees: Juraj Mokrý (SVK), Denny Cespedes (DOM)

5 August 2024; 21:00	United States	3–1	Brazil	South Paris Arena 1, Paris; Attendance: 9,346; Referees: Vladimir Simonović (SUI), Fabrice Collados (FRA)
5 August 2024; 21:00	(26–24, 28–30, 25–19, 25–19); P2 Report			South Paris Arena 1, Paris; Attendance: 9,346; Referees: Vladimir Simonović (SUI), Fabrice Collados (FRA)

=== Semifinals ===
7 August 2024; 16:00	Poland	3–2	United States	South Paris Arena 1, Paris; Attendance: 9,333; Referees: Stefano Cesare (ITA), Fabrice Collados (FRA)
7 August 2024; 16:00	(25–23, 25–27, 14–25, 25–23, 15–13); P2 Report			South Paris Arena 1, Paris; Attendance: 9,333; Referees: Stefano Cesare (ITA), Fabrice Collados (FRA)

7 August 2024; 20:00	Italy	0–3	France	South Paris Arena 1, Paris; Attendance: 9,547; Referees: Denny Cespedes (DOM), Ivaylo Ivanov (BUL)
7 August 2024; 20:00	(20–25, 21–25, 21–25); P2 Report			South Paris Arena 1, Paris; Attendance: 9,547; Referees: Denny Cespedes (DOM), Ivaylo Ivanov (BUL)

=== Bronze medal match ===
9 August 2024; 16:00	Italy	0–3	United States	South Paris Arena 1, Paris; Attendance: 9,376; Referees: Ivaylo Ivanov (BUL), Epaminondas Gerothodoros (GRE)
9 August 2024; 16:00	(23–25, 28–30, 24–26); P2 Report			South Paris Arena 1, Paris; Attendance: 9,376; Referees: Ivaylo Ivanov (BUL), Epaminondas Gerothodoros (GRE)

=== Gold medal match ===
10 August 2024; 13:00	France	3–0	Poland	South Paris Arena 1, Paris; Attendance: 9,233; Referees: Stefano Cesare (ITA), Hamid Al-Rousi (UAE)
10 August 2024; 13:00	(25–19, 25–20, 25–23); P2 Report			South Paris Arena 1, Paris; Attendance: 9,233; Referees: Stefano Cesare (ITA), Hamid Al-Rousi (UAE)

== Final standing ==
Rank	Team
1st place, gold medalist(s)	France
2nd place, silver medalist(s)	Poland
3rd place, bronze medalist(s)	United States
4	Italy
5	Slovenia
6	Germany
7	Japan
8	Brazil
9	Serbia
10	Canada
11	Argentina
12	Egypt

2024 Men's Olympic champions

France
2nd title

12–man roster
Barthélémy Chinenyeze, Jenia Grebennikov (L), Jean Patry, Benjamin Toniutti (c), Kévin Tillie, Earvin N'Gapeth, Antoine Brizard, Nicolas Le Goff, Trévor Clévenot, Yacine Louati, Théo Faure, Quentin Jouffroy
Head coach
Andrea Giani

== Medalists ==
Gold	Silver	Bronze
France Barthélémy Chinenyeze; Jenia Grebennikov (L); Jean Patry; Benjamin Toniutti (c); Kévin Tillie; Earvin N'Gapeth; Antoine Brizard; Nicolas Le Goff; Trévor Clévenot; Yacine Louati; Théo Faure; Quentin Jouffroy Head coach: Andrea Giani	Poland Łukasz Kaczmarek; Bartosz Kurek (c); Wilfredo León; Aleksander Śliwka; Grzegorz Łomacz; Jakub Kochanowski; Kamil Semeniuk; Paweł Zatorski (L); Marcin Janusz; Mateusz Bieniek; Tomasz Fornal; Norbert Huber; Bartłomiej Bołądź Head coach: Nikola Grbić	United States Matt Anderson; Aaron Russell; Jeffrey Jendryk; Torey DeFalco; Micah Christenson (c); Maxwell Holt; Micah Maʻa; Thomas Jaeschke; Garrett Muagututia; Taylor Averill; David Smith; Erik Shoji (L) Head coach: John Speraw

== Awards ==
The awards were announced on 10 August 2024.

Position	Player
Most valuable player	(France) Earvin N'Gapeth
Setter	(France) Antoine Brizard
Outside hitters	(France) Earvin N'Gapeth
Outside hitters	(France) Trévor Clévenot
Middle blockers	(Poland) Jakub Kochanowski
Middle blockers	(United States) Taylor Averill
Opposite spiker	(France) Jean Patry
Libero	(France) Jenia Grebennikov

== See also ==
- Volleyball at the Summer Olympics
- Volleyball at the 2024 Summer Olympics – Women's tournament
- Beach volleyball at the 2024 Summer Olympics – Men's tournament
- Sitting volleyball at the 2024 Summer Paralympics - Men's tournament
- 2024 FIVB Men's Volleyball Nations League
