= Volleyball at the 2020 Summer Olympics – Men's tournament =

Men's volleyball at the Games of the XXXII Olympiad
- Venue: Ariake Arena
- Date: 24 July – 7 August 2021
- Competitors: 144 from 12 nations

Medalists
1st place, gold medalist(s)		France (1st title)
2nd place, silver medalist(s)		ROC
3rd place, bronze medalist(s)		Argentina

The men's tournament in volleyball at the 2020 Summer Olympics was the 15th edition of the event at the Summer Olympics, organised by the world's governing body, the FIVB, in conjunction with the IOC. It was held in Tokyo, Japan from 24 July to 7 August 2021. It was originally scheduled to take place from 25 July to 8 August 2020, but due to the COVID-19 pandemic, the IOC and the Tokyo 2020 Organising Committee announced on 24 March 2020 that the 2020 Summer Olympics would be delayed to 2021. Because of this pandemic, all matches were played behind closed doors.

France won their first gold and overall medal with a 3–2 win over the Russian team that competed as the ROC. Argentina won the bronze medal in a narrow 3–2 victory over Brazil.

The medals for the competition were presented by Bernard Rajzman, IOC Member, Olympian, and Silver Medalist, Brazil; and the medalists' bouquets were presented by Ary Graça, FIVB President; Brazil.

== Competition schedule ==
P	Preliminary round	¼	Quarterfinals	½	Semifinals	B	Bronze medal match	F	Final

Sat 24	Sun 25	Mon 26	Tue 27	Wed 28	Thu 29	Fri 30	Sat 31	Sun 1	Mon 2	Tue 3	Wed 4	Thu 5	Fri 6	Sat 7	
P		P		P		P		P		¼		½		B	F

== Qualification ==
Event		Dates	Venue(s)	Quota	Qualifier(s)
Host nation		—N/a		1	Japan
Intercontinental Qualifier	Pool A	9–11 August 2019	(Bulgaria) Varna	1	Brazil
Intercontinental Qualifier	Pool B	9–11 August 2019	(Netherlands) Rotterdam	1	United States
Intercontinental Qualifier	Pool C	9–11 August 2019	(Italy) Bari	1	Italy
Intercontinental Qualifier	Pool D	9–11 August 2019	(Poland) Gdańsk–Sopot	1	Poland
Intercontinental Qualifier	Pool E	9–11 August 2019	(Russia) Saint Petersburg	1	(Russia) ROC
Intercontinental Qualifier	Pool F	9–11 August 2019	(China) Ningbo	1	Argentina
European Qualifier		5–10 January 2020	(Germany) Berlin	1	France
Asian Qualifier		7–12 January 2020	(China) Jiangmen	1	Iran
African Qualifier		7–11 January 2020	(Egypt) Cairo	1	Tunisia
South American Qualifier		10–12 January 2020	(Chile) Mostazal	1	Venezuela
North American Qualifier		10–12 January 2020	(Canada) Vancouver	1	Canada
Total				12	

== Format ==
The preliminary round was a competition between the twelve teams, who were divided into two pools of six teams. This round, the teams competed in a single round-robin format. The four highest ranked teams in each pool advanced to the knockout stage (quarterfinals).

The knockout stage followed the single-elimination format. The losers of the quarterfinals were eliminated. The quarterfinal winners played in the semifinals. The winners of the semifinals competed for gold medal and the losers played for bronze medal.

== Pools composition ==
Teams were seeded following the serpentine system according to their FIVB World Ranking as of 15 October 2019. FIVB reserved the right to seed the hosts as head of pool A regardless of the World Ranking. Rankings are shown in brackets except the hosts who ranked 10th. The pools were confirmed on 31 January 2020.

Pool A	Pool B
Japan (Hosts)	Brazil (1)
Poland (3)	United States (2)
Italy (4)	ROC (5)
Canada (7)	Argentina (6)
Iran (8)	France (9)
Venezuela (36)	Tunisia (22)

== Venue ==
All matches
Tokyo, Japan
Ariake Arena
Capacity: 15,000
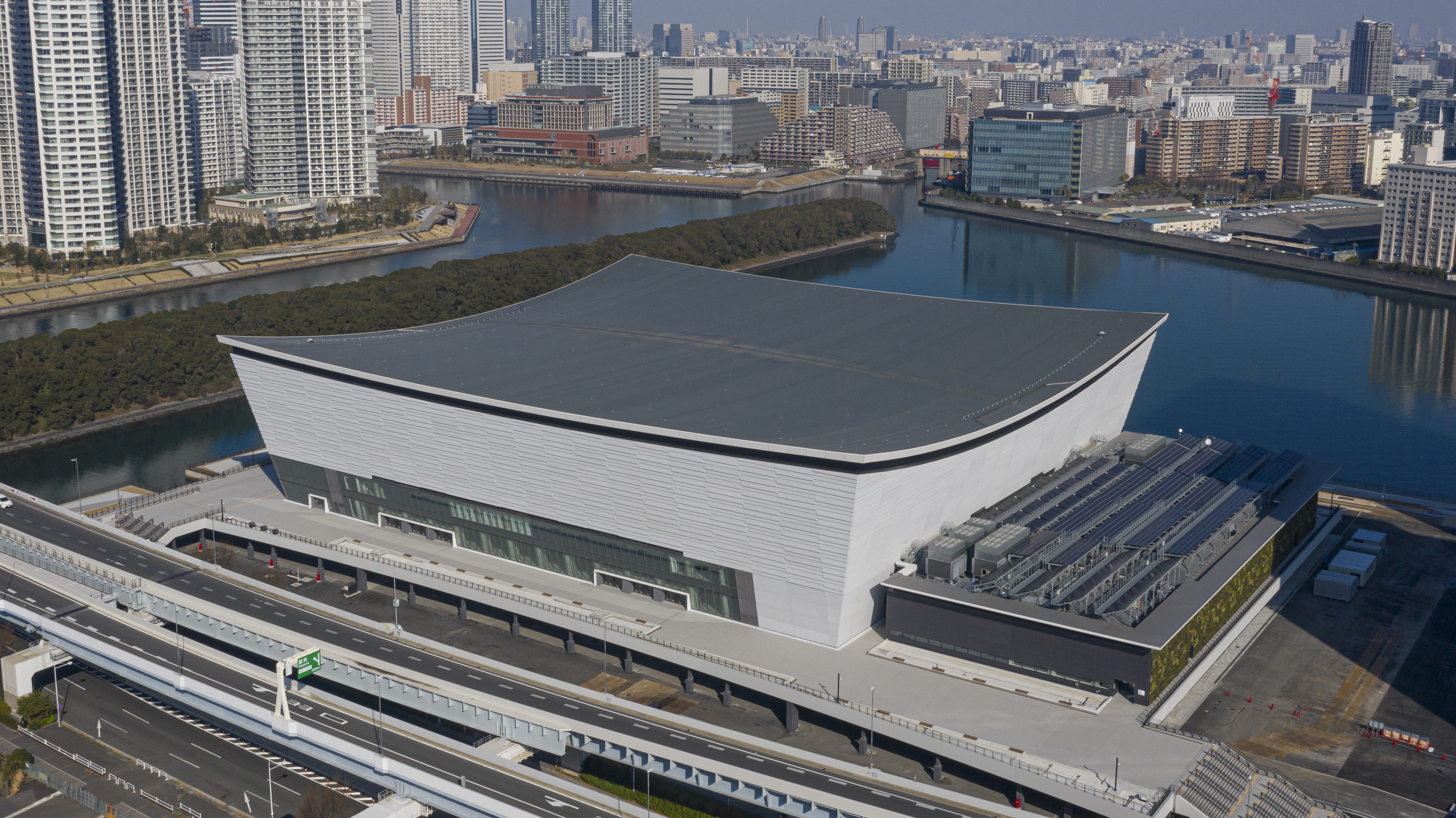

== Pool standing procedure ==
In order to establish the ranking of teams after the group stage, the following criteria should be implemented:

1. Number of matches won
2. Match points
3. Sets ratio
4. Points ratio
5. Result of the last match between the tied teams

Match won 3–0 or 3–1: 3 match points for the winner, 0 match points for the loser
Match won 3–2: 2 match points for the winner, 1 match point for the loser

== Referees ==
The following referees were selected for the tournament.

- (Argentina) Hernán Casamiquela
- (Brazil) Paulo Turci
- (China) Liu Jiang
- (Dominican Republic) Denny Cespedes
- (France) Fabrice Collados
- (Italy) Daniele Rapisarda
- (Japan) Shin Muranaka
- (Japan) Sumie Myoi
- (Mexico) Luis Macias
- (Poland) Wojciech Maroszek
- (Russia) Evgeny Makshanov
- (Serbia) Vladimir Simonović
- (Slovakia) Juraj Mokrý
- (South Korea) Kang Joo-hee
- (Spain) Susana Rodríguez
- (United Arab Emirates) Hamid Al-Rousi
- (United States) Patricia Rolf

== Preliminary round ==
- All times are Japan Standard Time (UTC+09:00).
- The top four teams in each pool qualified for the quarterfinals.

=== Pool A ===
Pos	Team	Pld	W	L	Pts	SW	SL	SR	SPW	SPL	SPR	Qualification
1	Poland	5	4	1	13	14	4	3.500	435	365	1.192	Quarterfinals
2	Italy	5	4	1	11	12	7	1.714	447	411	1.088	Quarterfinals
3	Japan (H)	5	3	2	8	10	9	1.111	437	433	1.009	Quarterfinals
4	Canada	5	2	3	7	9	9	1.000	396	387	1.023	Quarterfinals
5	Iran	5	2	3	6	9	11	0.818	453	460	0.985	
6	Venezuela	5	0	5	0	1	15	0.067	281	393	0.715	

Source: Tokyo 2020 and FIVB
Rules for classification: Tiebreakers
(H) Host

24 July 2021; 09:00 v	Italy	3–2	Canada	Ariake Arena, Tokyo; Referees: Evgeny Makshanov (RUS), Liu Jiang (CHN)
24 July 2021; 09:00 v	(26–28, 18–25, 25–21, 25–18, 15–11); Results Statistics			Ariake Arena, Tokyo; Referees: Evgeny Makshanov (RUS), Liu Jiang (CHN)

24 July 2021; 17:05 v	Japan	3–0	Venezuela	Ariake Arena, Tokyo; Referees: Luis Macias (MEX), Vladimir Simonovic (SRB)
24 July 2021; 17:05 v	(25–21, 25–20, 25–15); Results Statistics			Ariake Arena, Tokyo; Referees: Luis Macias (MEX), Vladimir Simonovic (SRB)

24 July 2021; 19:40 v	Poland	2–3	Iran	Ariake Arena, Tokyo; Referees: Daniele Rapisarda (ITA), Juraj Mokrý (SVK)
24 July 2021; 19:40 v	(25–18, 22–25, 22–25, 25–22, 21–23); Results Statistics			Ariake Arena, Tokyo; Referees: Daniele Rapisarda (ITA), Juraj Mokrý (SVK)

26 July 2021; 09:00 v	Iran	3–0	Venezuela	Ariake Arena, Tokyo; Referees: Hernán Casamiquela (ARG), Susana Rodríguez (ESP)
26 July 2021; 09:00 v	(25–17, 25–20, 25–18); Results Statistics			Ariake Arena, Tokyo; Referees: Hernán Casamiquela (ARG), Susana Rodríguez (ESP)

26 July 2021; 14:20 v	Poland	3–0	Italy	Ariake Arena, Tokyo; Referees: Paulo Turci (BRA), Denny Cespedes (DOM)
26 July 2021; 14:20 v	(25–20, 26–24, 25–20); Results Statistics			Ariake Arena, Tokyo; Referees: Paulo Turci (BRA), Denny Cespedes (DOM)

26 July 2021; 19:40 v	Japan	3–1	Canada	Ariake Arena, Tokyo; Referees: Daniele Rapisarda (ITA), Patricia Rolf (USA)
26 July 2021; 19:40 v	(23–25, 25–23, 25–23, 25–20); Results Statistics			Ariake Arena, Tokyo; Referees: Daniele Rapisarda (ITA), Patricia Rolf (USA)

28 July 2021; 09:00 v	Canada	3–0	Iran	Ariake Arena, Tokyo; Referees: Luis Macias (MEX), Paulo Turci (BRA)
28 July 2021; 09:00 v	(25–16, 25–20, 25–22); Results Statistics			Ariake Arena, Tokyo; Referees: Luis Macias (MEX), Paulo Turci (BRA)

28 July 2021; 17:15 v	Poland	3–1	Venezuela	Ariake Arena, Tokyo; Referees: Hamid Al-Rousi (UAE), Shin Muranaka (JPN)
28 July 2021; 17:15 v	(25–16, 25–13, 18–25, 25–15); Results Statistics			Ariake Arena, Tokyo; Referees: Hamid Al-Rousi (UAE), Shin Muranaka (JPN)

28 July 2021; 19:40 v	Japan	1–3	Italy	Ariake Arena, Tokyo; Referees: Juraj Mokrý (SVK), Fabrice Collados (FRA)
28 July 2021; 19:40 v	(20–25, 17–25, 25–23, 21–25); Results Statistics			Ariake Arena, Tokyo; Referees: Juraj Mokrý (SVK), Fabrice Collados (FRA)

30 July 2021; 09:00 v	Canada	3–0	Venezuela	Ariake Arena, Tokyo; Referees: Patricia Rolf (USA), Susana Rodríguez (ESP)
30 July 2021; 09:00 v	(25–13, 25–22, 25–12); Results Statistics			Ariake Arena, Tokyo; Referees: Patricia Rolf (USA), Susana Rodríguez (ESP)

30 July 2021; 14:20 v	Japan	0–3	Poland	Ariake Arena, Tokyo; Referees: Hernán Casamiquela (ARG), Liu Jiang (CHN)
30 July 2021; 14:20 v	(22–25, 21–25, 24–26); Results Statistics			Ariake Arena, Tokyo; Referees: Hernán Casamiquela (ARG), Liu Jiang (CHN)

30 July 2021; 19:40 v	Italy	3–1	Iran	Ariake Arena, Tokyo; Referees: Vladimir Simonović (SRB), Denny Cespedes (DOM)
30 July 2021; 19:40 v	(30–28, 25–21, 21–25, 25–21); Results Statistics			Ariake Arena, Tokyo; Referees: Vladimir Simonović (SRB), Denny Cespedes (DOM)

1 August 2021; 09:00 v	Poland	3–0	Canada	Ariake Arena, Tokyo; Referees: Paulo Turci (BRA), Hamid Al-Rousi (UAE)
1 August 2021; 09:00 v	(25–15, 25–21, 25–16); Results Statistics			Ariake Arena, Tokyo; Referees: Paulo Turci (BRA), Hamid Al-Rousi (UAE)

1 August 2021; 16:25 v	Italy	3–0	Venezuela	Ariake Arena, Tokyo; Referees: Hernán Casamiquela (ARG), Sumie Myoi (JPN)
1 August 2021; 16:25 v	(25–22, 25–15, 25–17); Results Statistics			Ariake Arena, Tokyo; Referees: Hernán Casamiquela (ARG), Sumie Myoi (JPN)

1 August 2021; 19:40 v	Japan	3–2	Iran	Ariake Arena, Tokyo; Referees: Juraj Mokrý (SVK), Daniele Rapisarda (ITA)
1 August 2021; 19:40 v	(25–21, 20–25, 29–31, 25–22, 15–13); Results Statistics			Ariake Arena, Tokyo; Referees: Juraj Mokrý (SVK), Daniele Rapisarda (ITA)

=== Pool B ===
Pos	Team	Pld	W	L	Pts	SW	SL	SR	SPW	SPL	SPR	Qualification
1	ROC	5	4	1	12	13	5	2.600	427	397	1.076	Quarterfinals
2	Brazil	5	4	1	10	12	8	1.500	476	450	1.058	Quarterfinals
3	Argentina	5	3	2	8	12	10	1.200	476	464	1.026	Quarterfinals
4	France	5	2	3	8	10	10	1.000	449	442	1.016	Quarterfinals
5	United States	5	2	3	6	8	10	0.800	432	412	1.049	
6	Tunisia	5	0	5	1	3	15	0.200	339	434	0.781	

Source: Tokyo 2020 and FIVB
Rules for classification: Tiebreakers

24 July 2021; 12:02 v	Brazil	3–0	Tunisia	Ariake Arena, Tokyo; Referees: Hamid Al-Rousi (UAE), Fabrice Collados (FRA)
24 July 2021; 12:02 v	(25–22, 25–20, 25–15); Results Statistics			Ariake Arena, Tokyo; Referees: Hamid Al-Rousi (UAE), Fabrice Collados (FRA)

24 July 2021; 14:20 v	ROC	3–1	Argentina	Ariake Arena, Tokyo; Referees: Denny Cespedes (DOM), Paulo Turci (BRA)
24 July 2021; 14:20 v	(21–25, 25–23, 25–17, 25–21); Results Statistics			Ariake Arena, Tokyo; Referees: Denny Cespedes (DOM), Paulo Turci (BRA)

24 July 2021; 23:00 v	United States	3–0	France	Ariake Arena, Tokyo; Referees: Wojciech Maroszek (POL), Hernán Casamiquela (ARG)
24 July 2021; 23:00 v	(25–18, 25–18, 25–22); Results Statistics			Ariake Arena, Tokyo; Referees: Wojciech Maroszek (POL), Hernán Casamiquela (ARG)

26 July 2021; 11:05 v	United States	1–3	ROC	Ariake Arena, Tokyo; Referees: Juraj Mokrý (SVK), Liu Jiang (CHN)
26 July 2021; 11:05 v	(23–25, 25–27, 25–21, 23–25); Results Statistics			Ariake Arena, Tokyo; Referees: Juraj Mokrý (SVK), Liu Jiang (CHN)

26 July 2021; 16:25 v	France	3–0	Tunisia	Ariake Arena, Tokyo; Referees: Vladimir Simonović (SRB), Kang Joo-hee (KOR)
26 July 2021; 16:25 v	(25–21, 25–11, 25–21); Results Statistics			Ariake Arena, Tokyo; Referees: Vladimir Simonović (SRB), Kang Joo-hee (KOR)

26 July 2021; 22:25 v	Brazil	3–2	Argentina	Ariake Arena, Tokyo; Referees: Shin Muranaka (JPN), Luis Macias (MEX)
26 July 2021; 22:25 v	(19–25, 21–25, 25–16, 25–21, 16–14); Results Statistics			Ariake Arena, Tokyo; Referees: Shin Muranaka (JPN), Luis Macias (MEX)

28 July 2021; 11:05 v	United States	3–1	Tunisia	Ariake Arena, Tokyo; Referees: Evgeny Makshanov (RUS), Sumie Myoi (JPN)
28 July 2021; 11:05 v	(25–14, 23–25, 25–14, 25–23); Results Statistics			Ariake Arena, Tokyo; Referees: Evgeny Makshanov (RUS), Sumie Myoi (JPN)

28 July 2021; 14:20 v	Argentina	3–2	France	Ariake Arena, Tokyo; Referees: Liu Jiang (CHN), Daniele Rapisarda (ITA)
28 July 2021; 14:20 v	(23–25, 25–17, 25–20, 15–25, 15–13); Results Statistics			Ariake Arena, Tokyo; Referees: Liu Jiang (CHN), Daniele Rapisarda (ITA)

28 July 2021; 22:16 v	Brazil	0–3	ROC	Ariake Arena, Tokyo; Referees: Wojciech Maroszek (POL), Vladimir Simonović (SRB)
28 July 2021; 22:16 v	(22–25, 20–25, 20–25); Results Statistics			Ariake Arena, Tokyo; Referees: Wojciech Maroszek (POL), Vladimir Simonović (SRB)

30 July 2021; 11:05 v	Brazil	3–1	United States	Ariake Arena, Tokyo; Referees: Daniele Rapisarda (ITA), Luis Macias (MEX)
30 July 2021; 11:05 v	(30–32, 25–23, 25–21, 25–20); Results Statistics			Ariake Arena, Tokyo; Referees: Daniele Rapisarda (ITA), Luis Macias (MEX)

30 July 2021; 16:30 v	Argentina	3–2	Tunisia	Ariake Arena, Tokyo; Referees: Juraj Mokrý (SVK), Wojciech Maroszek (POL)
30 July 2021; 16:30 v	(23–25, 23–25, 25–19, 25–18, 15–8); Results Statistics			Ariake Arena, Tokyo; Referees: Juraj Mokrý (SVK), Wojciech Maroszek (POL)

30 July 2021; 22:35 v	ROC	1–3	France	Ariake Arena, Tokyo; Referees: Shin Muranaka (JPN), Paulo Turci (BRA)
30 July 2021; 22:35 v	(21–25, 25–20, 17–25, 20–25); Results Statistics			Ariake Arena, Tokyo; Referees: Shin Muranaka (JPN), Paulo Turci (BRA)

1 August 2021; 11:05 v	Brazil	3–2	France	Ariake Arena, Tokyo; Referees: Wojciech Maroszek (POL), Liu Jiang (CHN)
1 August 2021; 11:05 v	(25–22, 37–39, 25–17, 21–25, 20–18); Results Statistics			Ariake Arena, Tokyo; Referees: Wojciech Maroszek (POL), Liu Jiang (CHN)

1 August 2021; 14:25 v	ROC	3–0	Tunisia	Ariake Arena, Tokyo; Referees: Luis Macias (MEX), Patricia Rolf (USA)
1 August 2021; 14:25 v	(25–20, 25–22, 25–16); Results Statistics			Ariake Arena, Tokyo; Referees: Luis Macias (MEX), Patricia Rolf (USA)

1 August 2021; 23:00 v	United States	0–3	Argentina	Ariake Arena, Tokyo; Referees: Denny Cespedes (DOM), Vladimir Simonović (SRB)
1 August 2021; 23:00 v	(21–25, 23–25, 23–25); Results Statistics			Ariake Arena, Tokyo; Referees: Denny Cespedes (DOM), Vladimir Simonović (SRB)

== Knockout stage ==
- All times are Japan Standard Time (UTC+09:00).
- The first ranked teams of both pools played against the fourth ranked teams of the other pool. The second ranked teams faced the second or third ranked teams of the other pool, determined by drawing of lots. The drawing of lots was held after the last match in the preliminary round.

=== Bracket ===
Quarterfinals
3 August
Poland	2
France	3
3 August
Italy	2
Argentina	3
3 August
Japan	0
Brazil	3
3 August
Canada	0
ROC	3

Semifinals
5 August
France	3
Argentina	0
5 August
Brazil	1
ROC	3

Gold medal match
7 August
France	3
ROC	2
Bronze medal match
7 August
Argentina	3
Brazil	2

=== Quarterfinals ===
3 August 2021; 09:00 v	Canada	0–3	ROC	Ariake Arena, Tokyo; Referees: Hernán Casamiquela (ARG), Shin Muranaka (JPN)
3 August 2021; 09:00 v	(21–25, 28–30, 22–25); Results Statistics			Ariake Arena, Tokyo; Referees: Hernán Casamiquela (ARG), Shin Muranaka (JPN)

3 August 2021; 13:00 v	Japan	0–3	Brazil	Ariake Arena, Tokyo; Referees: Denny Cespedes (DOM), Liu Jiang (CHN)
3 August 2021; 13:00 v	(20–25, 22–25, 20–25); Results Statistics			Ariake Arena, Tokyo; Referees: Denny Cespedes (DOM), Liu Jiang (CHN)

3 August 2021; 17:01 v	Italy	2–3	Argentina	Ariake Arena, Tokyo; Referees: Vladimir Simonović (SRB), Wojciech Maroszek (POL)
3 August 2021; 17:01 v	(25–21, 23–25, 22–25, 25–14, 12–15); Results Statistics			Ariake Arena, Tokyo; Referees: Vladimir Simonović (SRB), Wojciech Maroszek (POL)

3 August 2021; 21:30 v	Poland	2–3	France	Ariake Arena, Tokyo; Referees: Juraj Mokrý (SVK), Daniele Rapisarda (ITA)
3 August 2021; 21:30 v	(25–21, 22–25, 25–21, 21–25, 9–15); Results Statistics			Ariake Arena, Tokyo; Referees: Juraj Mokrý (SVK), Daniele Rapisarda (ITA)

=== Semifinals ===
5 August 2021; 13:00 v	Brazil	1–3	ROC	Ariake Arena, Tokyo; Referees: Daniele Rapisarda (ITA), Wojciech Maroszek (POL)
5 August 2021; 13:00 v	(25–18, 21–25, 24–26, 23–25); Results Statistics			Ariake Arena, Tokyo; Referees: Daniele Rapisarda (ITA), Wojciech Maroszek (POL)

5 August 2021; 21:00 v	France	3–0	Argentina	Ariake Arena, Tokyo; Referees: Shin Muranaka (JPN), Liu Jiang (CHN)
5 August 2021; 21:00 v	(25–22, 25–19, 25–22); Results Statistics			Ariake Arena, Tokyo; Referees: Shin Muranaka (JPN), Liu Jiang (CHN)

=== Bronze medal match ===
7 August 2021; 13:31 v	(bronze) Argentina	3–2	Brazil	Ariake Arena, Tokyo; Referees: Wojciech Maroszek (POL), Fabrice Collados (FRA)
7 August 2021; 13:31 v	(25–23, 20–25, 20–25, 25–17, 15–13); Results Statistics			Ariake Arena, Tokyo; Referees: Wojciech Maroszek (POL), Fabrice Collados (FRA)

=== Gold medal match ===
7 August 2021; 21:15 v	(gold) France	3–2	ROC (silver)	Ariake Arena, Tokyo; Referees: Vladimir Simonović (SRB), Paulo Turci (BRA)
7 August 2021; 21:15 v	(25–23, 25–17, 21–25, 21–25, 15–12); Results Statistics			Ariake Arena, Tokyo; Referees: Vladimir Simonović (SRB), Paulo Turci (BRA)

== Final standing ==
Rank	Team
1st place, gold medalist(s)	France
2nd place, silver medalist(s)	ROC
3rd place, bronze medalist(s)	Argentina
4	Brazil
5	Poland
6	Italy
7	Japan
8	Canada
9	Iran
10	United States
11	Tunisia
12	Venezuela

2020 Men's Olympic champions

France
First title

12–man Roster
Barthélémy Chinenyeze, Jenia Grebennikov (L), Jean Patry, Benjamin Toniutti (c), Kévin Tillie, Earvin N'Gapeth, Antoine Brizard, Stéphen Boyer, Nicolas Le Goff, Daryl Bultor, Trévor Clévenot, Yacine Louati
Head coach
Laurent Tillie

== Medalists ==
Gold	Silver	Bronze
France Barthélémy Chinenyeze; Jenia Grebennikov (L); Jean Patry; Benjamin Toniutti (c); Kévin Tillie; Earvin N'Gapeth; Antoine Brizard; Stéphen Boyer; Nicolas Le Goff; Daryl Bultor; Trévor Clévenot; Yacine Louati Head coach: Laurent Tillie	ROC Yaroslav Podlesnykh; Artem Volvich; Dmitry Volkov; Ivan Iakovlev; Denis Bogdan; Pavel Pankov; Viktor Poletaev; Maxim Mikhaylov; Egor Kliuka; Ilyas Kurkaev; Igor Kobzar (c); Valentin Golubev (L) Head coach: Tuomas Sammelvuo	Argentina Matías Sánchez; Federico Pereyra; Cristian Poglajen; Facundo Conte; Agustín Loser; Santiago Danani (L); Sebastián Solé; Bruno Lima; Ezequiel Palacios; Luciano De Cecco (c); Nicolás Méndez; Martín Ramos Head coach: Marcelo Méndez

== Awards ==
The awards were announced on 7 August 2021.

Position	Player
Most valuable player	(France) Earvin N'Gapeth
Setter	(Argentina) Luciano De Cecco
Outside hitters	(France) Earvin N'Gapeth
Outside hitters	(Russia) Egor Kliuka
Middle blockers	(Russia) Ivan Iakovlev
Middle blockers	(France) Barthélémy Chinenyeze
Opposite spiker	(Russia) Maxim Mikhaylov
Libero	(France) Jenia Grebennikov

== Statistics leaders ==
- Only players whose teams advanced to the semifinals were ranked.

Best Scorers

Rank	Name	Points
1	(Argentina) Bruno Lima	138
2	(France) Earvin N'Gapeth	136
3	(France) Jean Patry	135
4	(Russia) Maksim Mikhaylov	130
5	(Argentina) Facundo Conte	125

Best Spikers

Rank	Name	%Eff
1	(France) Jean Patry	42.06
2	(France) Trévor Clévenot	34.03
3	(Russia) Maksim Mikhaylov	33.33
4	(Brazil) Yoandy Leal	33.16
5	(Brazil) Ricardo Lucarelli	32.37

Best Blockers

Rank	Name	Avg
1	(Russia) Ivan Iakovlev	0.70
2	(Brazil) Lucas Saatkamp	0.66
3	(Argentina) Agustín Loser	0.63
4	(France) Barthélémy Chinenyeze	0.61
4	(France) Nicolas Le Goff	0.61

Best Servers

Rank	Name	Avg
1	(Brazil) Ricardo Lucarelli	0.38
2	(Argentina) Bruno Lima	0.26
3	(France) Antoine Brizard	0.24
4	(Russia) Egor Kliuka	0.23
5	(France) Jean Patry	0.21

Best Diggers

Rank	Name	Avg
1	(Brazil) Thales Hoss	2.25
2	(France) Jenia Grebennikov	1.94
3	(Russia) Valentin Golubev	1.73
4	(Argentina) Santiago Danani	1.66
5	(Brazil) Bruno Rezende	1.22

Best Setters

Rank	Name	Avg
1	(Brazil) Bruno Rezende	10.78
2	(Argentina) Luciano De Cecco	10.34
3	(Russia) Igor Kobzar	8.73
4	(France) Antoine Brizard	7.09
5	(France) Benjamin Toniutti	4.12

Best Receivers

Rank	Name	%Succ
1	(Brazil) Thales Hoss	73.15
2	(Argentina) Santiago Danani	67.08
3	(Russia) Egor Kliuka	66.67
4	(France) Trévor Clévenot	64.74
5	(Argentina) Facundo Conte	62.56

Source: Olympics.com

== See also ==
- Volleyball at the Summer Olympics
- Volleyball at the 2020 Summer Olympics – Women's tournament
- Beach volleyball at the 2020 Summer Olympics – Men's tournament
- Sitting volleyball at the 2020 Summer Paralympics - Men's tournament
