= Jean Patry =

French volleyball player (born 1996)

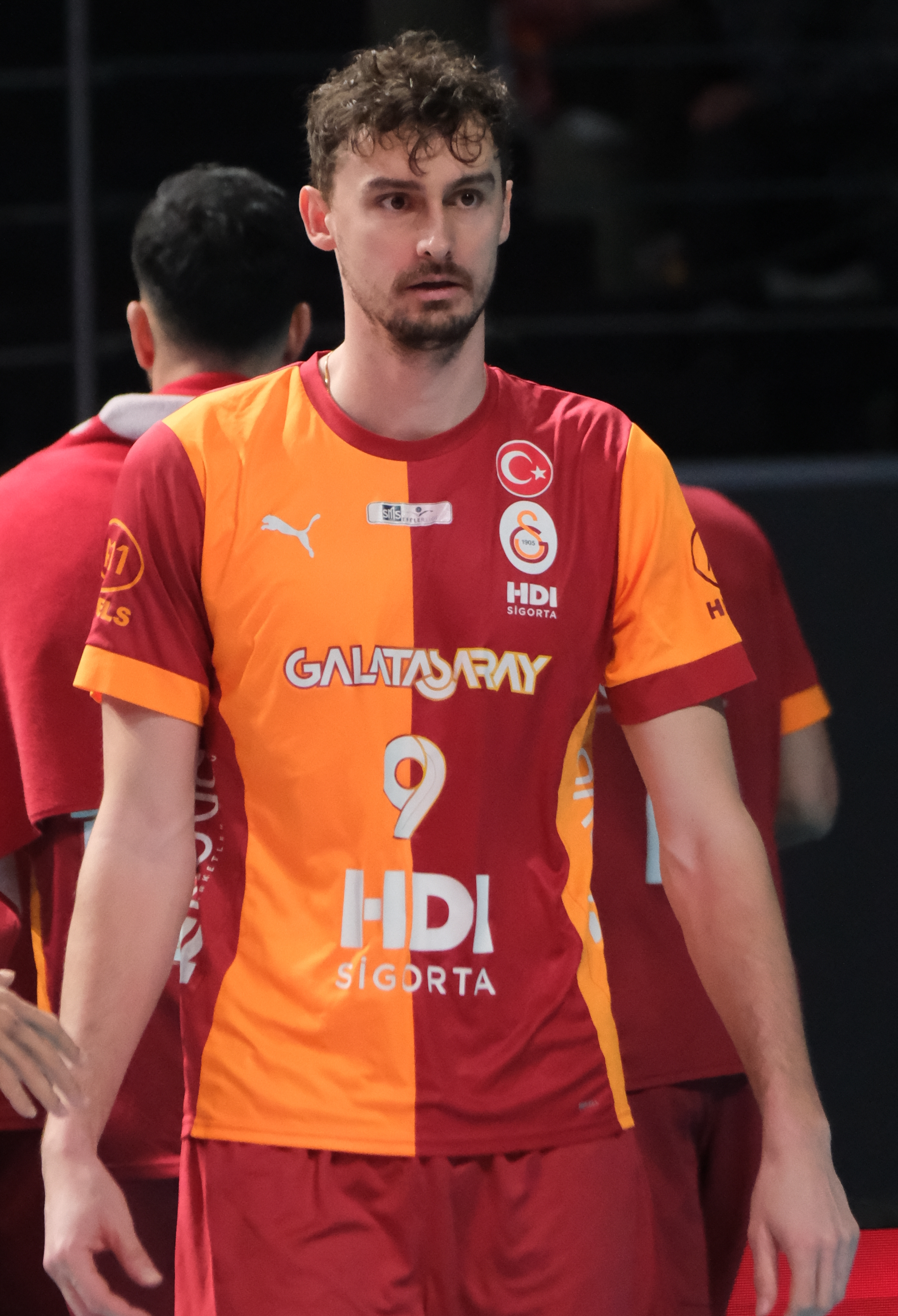
- Patry in 2026

Personal information
- Full name: Jean Mathias Gérard Patry
- Born: 27 December 1996 (age 29); Montpellier, France
- Height: 2.07 m (6 ft 9 in)
- Weight: 94 kg (207 lb)
- Spike: 357 cm (141 in)
- Block: 334 cm (131 in)

Volleyball information
- Position: Opposite
- Current club: Galatasaray
- Number: 9

Career
Years	Teams
2013–2019; 2019–2020; 2020–2023; 2023–2024; 2024; 2024–	Montpellier Volley; Top Volley Cisterna; Power Volley Milano; Jastrzębski Węgiel; Jakarta Bhayangkara Presisi; Galatasaray

National team
2017–	France
Honours
Men's volleyball
Representing France
Olympic Games
Gold medal – first place	2020 Tokyo	Team
Gold medal – first place	2024 Paris	Team
FIVB Nations League
Gold medal – first place	2022 Bologna
Gold medal – first place	2024 Łódź
Silver medal – second place	2018 Lille
Bronze medal – third place	2021 Rimini

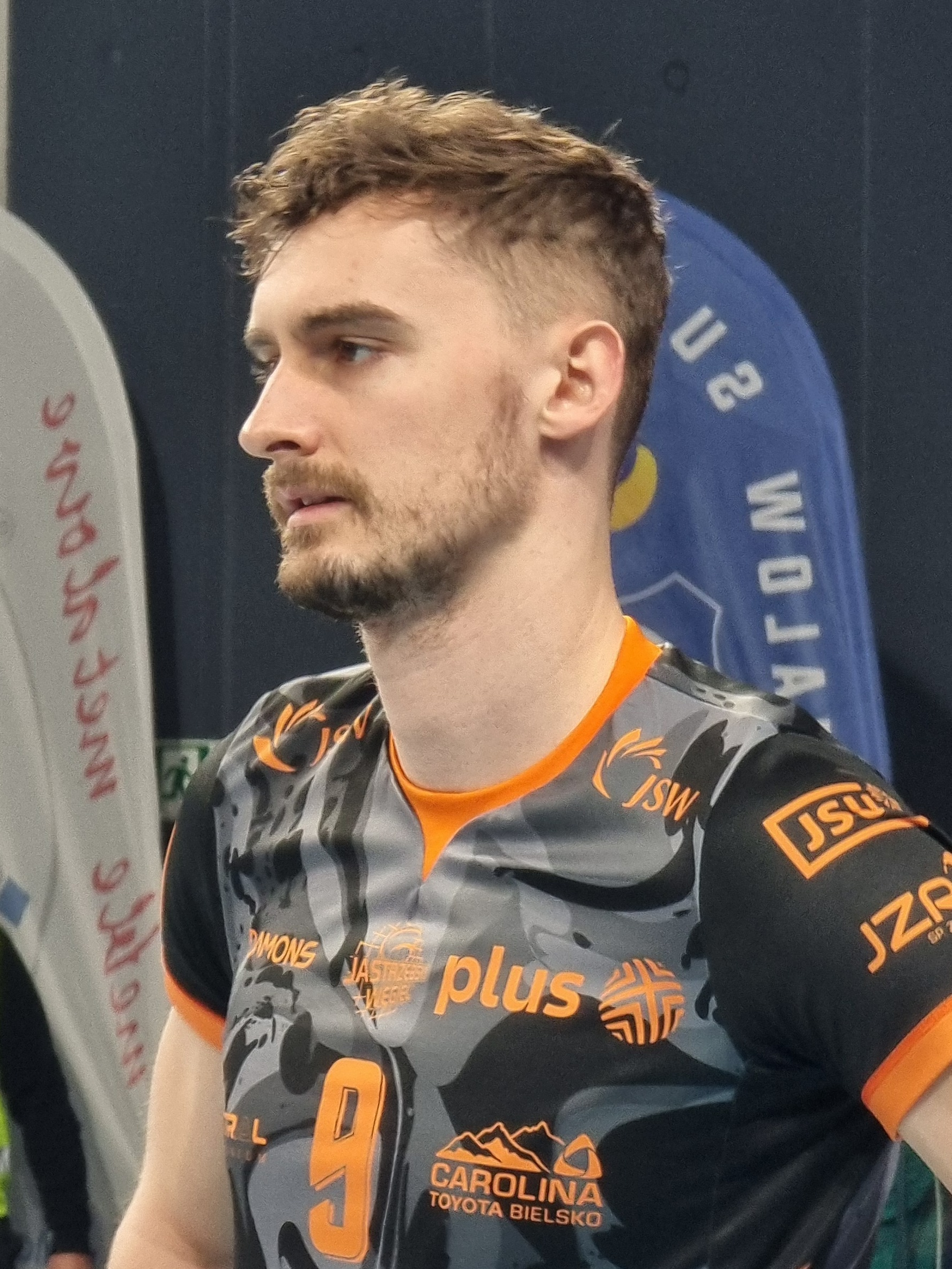
Patry in 2024

Jean Mathias Gérard Patry (born 27 December 1996) is a French professional volleyball player who plays as an opposite spiker for Galatasaray and the France national team. Patry won a gold medal in the men's tournament at the Olympic Games Tokyo 2020.

== Club career ==
On 14 July 2024, he was announced as a new player of Galatasaray.

== Honours ==
=== Club ===
- CEV Champions League
  - 2023–24 – with Jastrzębski Węgiel
- CEV Challenge Cup
  - 2020–21 – with Allianz Powervolley Milano
- Domestic
  - 2023–24 Polish Championship, with Jastrzębski Węgiel

=== Individual awards ===
- 2020: European Olympic Qualification Tournament – Most valuable player
- 2020: European Olympic Qualification Tournament – Best opposite spiker
- 2021: CEV Challenge Cup – Most valuable player
- 2022: FIVB Nations League – Best opposite spiker
- 2024: FIVB Nations League – Best opposite spiker
- 2024: Olympic Games Paris – Best opposite spiker

=== State awards ===
- 2021: Knight of the Legion of Honor

Awards
Preceded by (Brazil) Wallace de Souza (Poland) Bartosz Kurek	Best Opposite Spiker of FIVB Nations League; 2022	Succeeded by (Poland) Łukasz Kaczmarek
