= Nicolas Le Goff =

French volleyball player (born 1992)

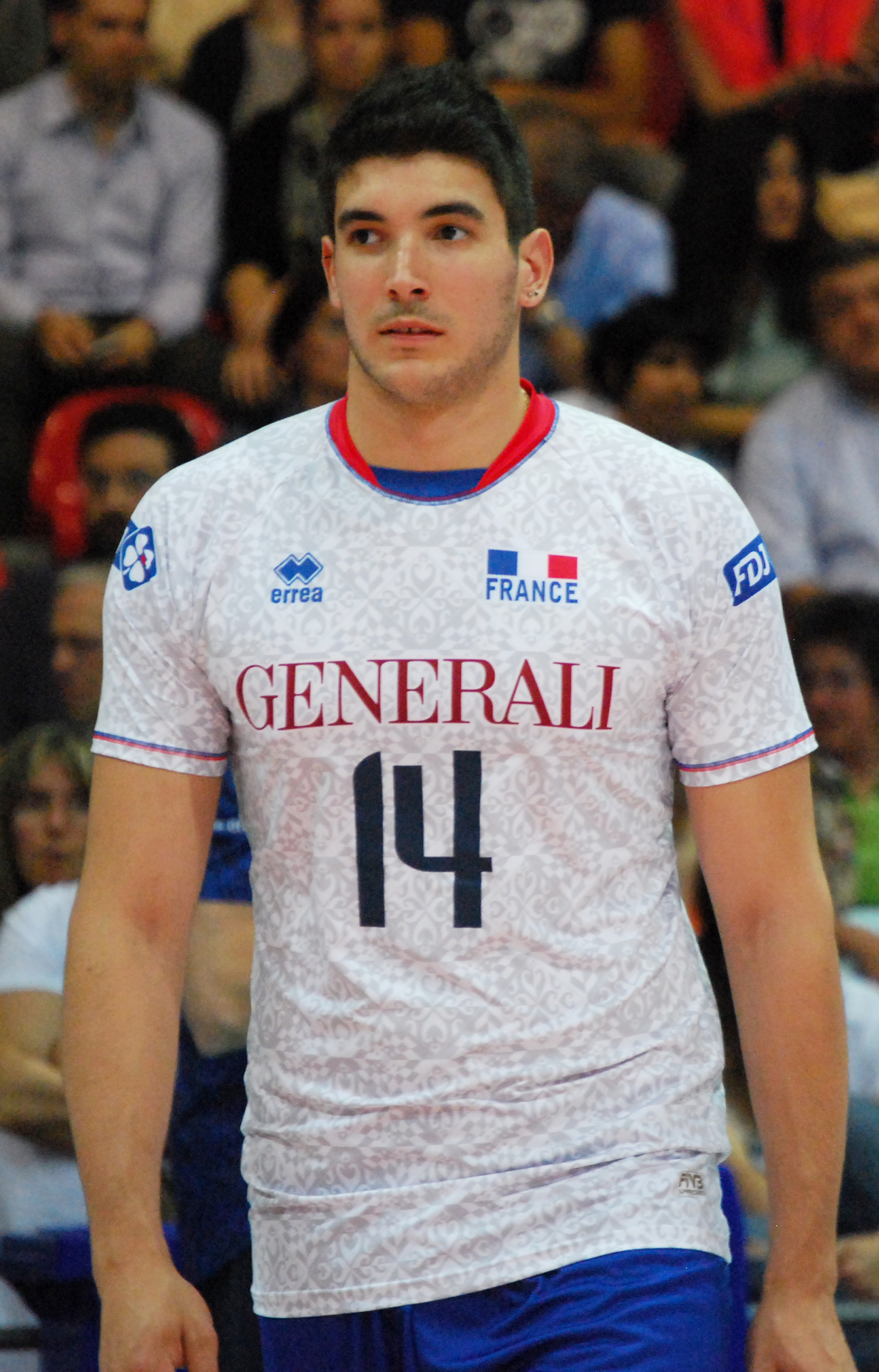
- Le Goff in 2013

Personal information
- Born: 15 February 1992 (age 34); Paris, France
- Height: 2.07 m (6 ft 9 in)
- Weight: 112 kg (247 lb)
- Spike: 365 cm (144 in)
- Block: 345 cm (136 in)

Volleyball information
- Position: Middle blocker
- Current club: Montpellier Volley
- Number: 14

Career
Years	Teams
2011–2015; 2015–2016; 2016–2017; 2017–2018; 2018–2020; 2020–	Montpellier Volley; Berlin Recycling Volleys; İstanbul BBSK; Taiwan Excellence Latina; Berlin Recycling Volleys; Montpellier Volley

National team
2013–	France
Honours
Men's volleyball
Representing France
Olympic Games
Gold medal – first place	2020 Tokyo	Team
Gold medal – first place	2024 Paris	Team
FIVB World League
Gold medal – first place	2015 Rio de Janeiro
Gold medal – first place	2017 Curitiba
Bronze medal – third place	2016 Kraków
FIVB Nations League
Gold medal – first place	2022 Bologna
Gold medal – first place	2024 Łódź
Silver medal – second place	2018 Lille
Bronze medal – third place	2021 Rimini
CEV European Championship
Gold medal – first place	2015 Bulgaria/Italy

Nicolas Jean-François Emmanuel Le Goff (born 15 February 1992) is a French professional volleyball player who plays as a middle blocker for Montpellier Volley and the France national team. Le Goff won a gold medal in the men's tournament at the Olympic Games Tokyo 2020 and Paris 2024.

== Honours ==
=== Club ===
- CEV Cup
  - 2015–16 – with Berlin Recycling Volleys
- Domestic
  - 2015–16 German Cup, with Berlin Recycling Volleys
  - 2015–16 German Championship, with Berlin Recycling Volleys
  - 2018–19 German Championship, with Berlin Recycling Volleys
  - 2019–20 German SuperCup, with Berlin Recycling Volleys
  - 2019–20 German Cup, with Berlin Recycling Volleys
  - 2021–22 French Championship, with Montpellier Volley

=== Youth national team ===
- 2009 CEV U19 European Championship

=== Individual awards ===
- 2021: French Championship – Most valuable player
- 2021: French Championship – Best middle blocker
- 2024: FIVB Nations League – Best middle blocker

=== State awards ===
- 2021: Knight of the Legion of Honour
