= Barthélémy Chinenyeze =

French volleyball player (born 1998)

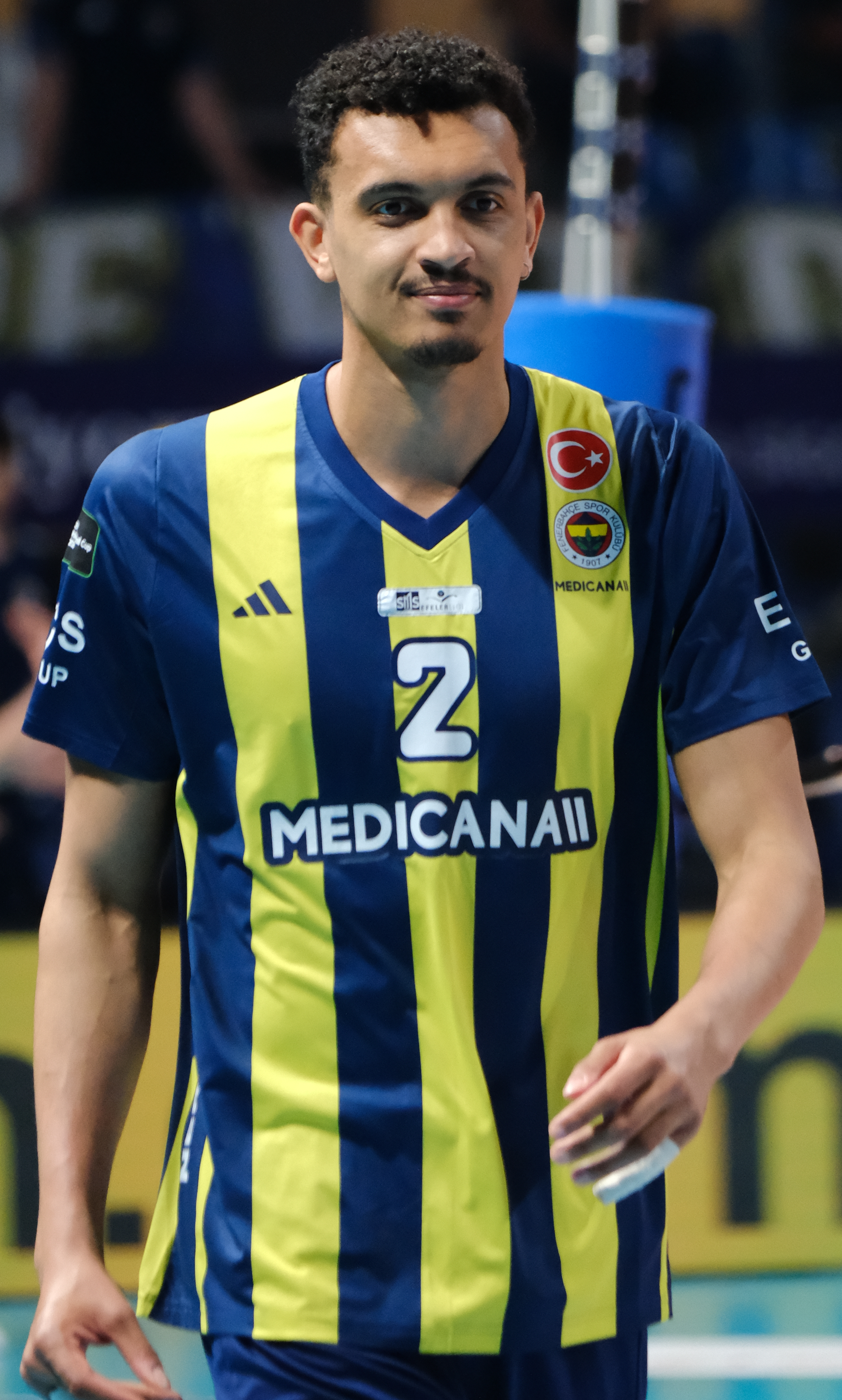
- Chinenyeze in 2025

Personal information
- Full name: Barthélémy Ikechi Ross Chinenyeze
- Born: 28 February 1998 (age 28); Coudekerque-Branche, France
- Height: 2.04 m (6 ft 8 in)
- Weight: 80 kg (176 lb)
- Spike: 375 cm (148 in)
- Block: 345 cm (136 in)

Volleyball information
- Position: Middle blocker
- Current club: Fenerbahçe
- Number: 10

Career
Years	Teams
2016–2018; 2018; 2018–2019; 2019–2021; 2021–2022; 2022–2025; 2025–	Spacer's de Toulouse; Asseco Resovia; Tours VB; Volley Callipo; Allianz Milano; Cucine Lube Civitanova; Fenerbahçe

National team
2017–	France
Honours
Men's volleyball
Representing France
Olympic Games
Gold medal – first place	2020 Tokyo	Team
Gold medal – first place	2024 Paris	Team
FIVB World League
Gold medal – first place	2017 Curitiba
FIVB Nations League
Gold medal – first place	2022 Bologna
Silver medal – second place	2018 Lille
Bronze medal – third place	2021 Rimini

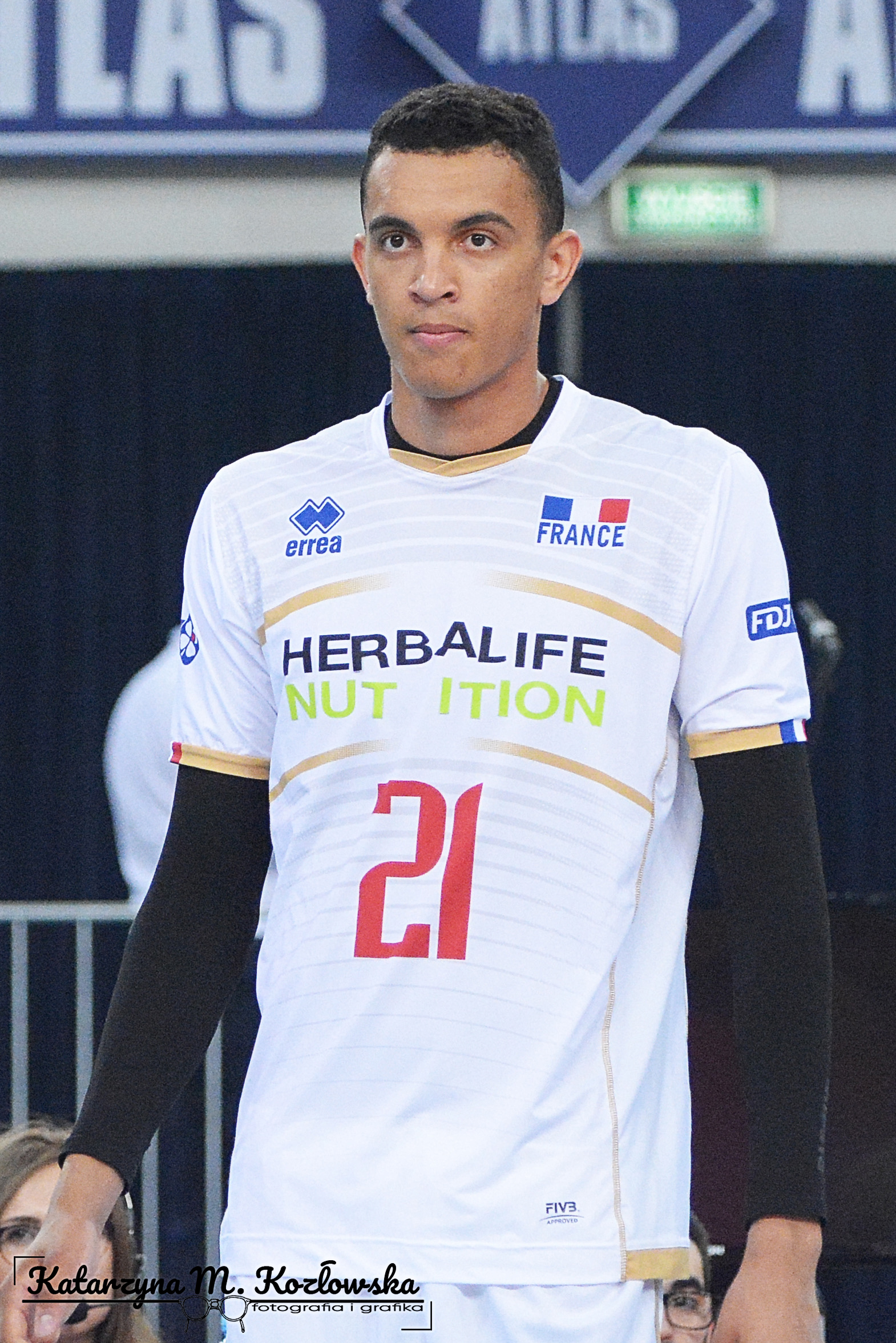

Barthélémy Ikechi Ross Chinenyeze (born 28 February 1998) is a French professional volleyball player who plays as a middle blocker for Fenerbahçe and the France national team. Chinenyeze won a gold medal in the men's tournament at the Olympic Games Tokyo 2020.

== Personal life ==
Chinenyeze was born in France to an Igbo Nigerian father and French mother.

== Career ==
He joined the national team in 2017, and participated in the 2017 European Championship and the 2017 World Grand Champions Cup. He was a gold medalist at the 2017 World League. On 2 March 2018, he joined Asseco Resovia.

== Honours ==
=== Club ===
- Domestic
  - 2018–19 French Cup, with Tours VB
  - 2018–19 French Championship, with Tours VB
  - 2022–23 Italian Championship, with Cucine Lube Civitanova

=== Individual awards ===
- 2018: French Championship – Best middle blocker
- 2019: French Championship – Most valuable player
- 2019: French Championship – Best middle blocker
- 2021: Olympic Games – Best middle blocker

=== State awards ===
- 2021: Knight of the Legion of Honour
