= Trévor Clévenot =

French volleyball player (born 1994)

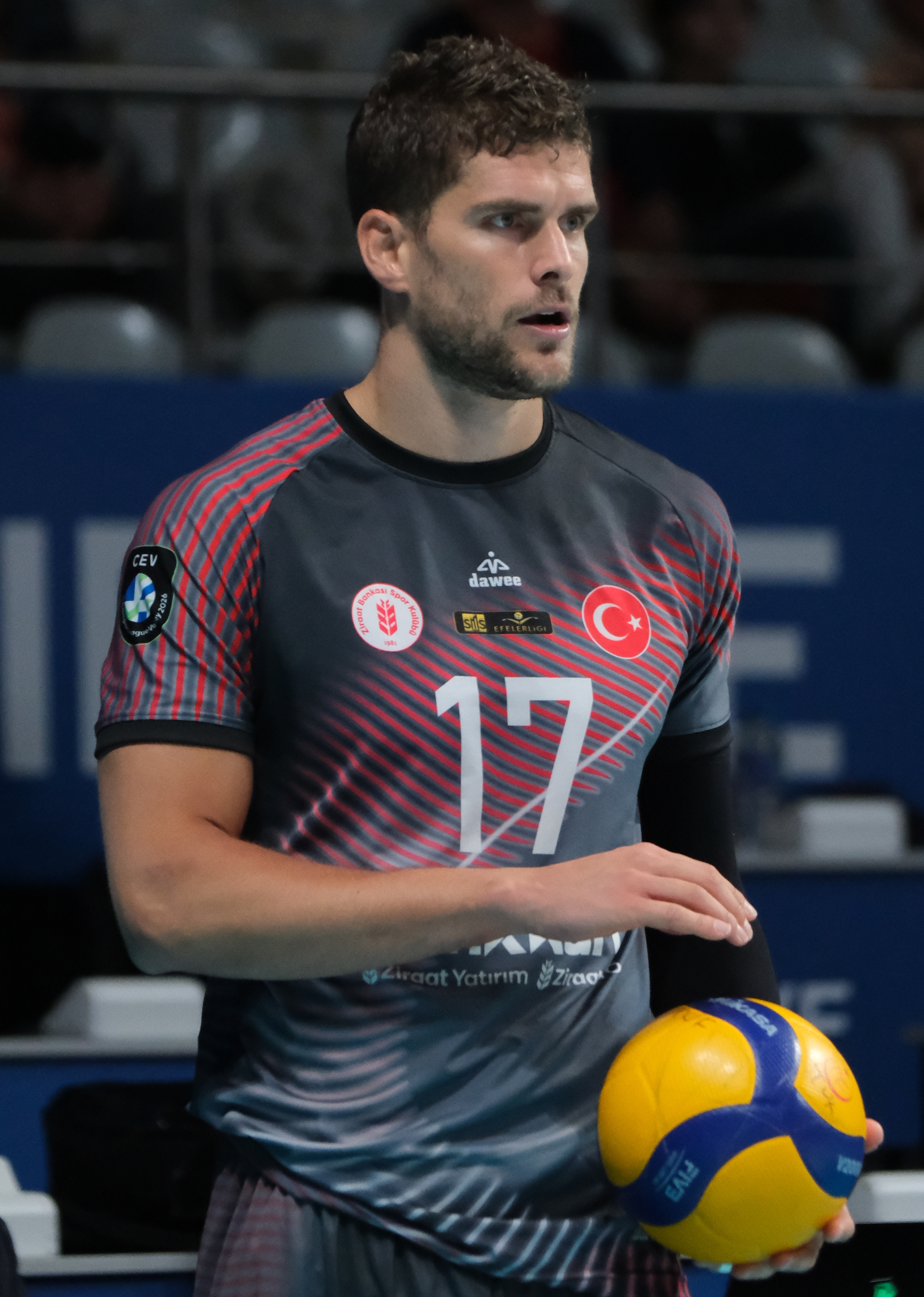
- Clévenot in 2026

Personal information
- Full name: Trévor Gérard Jean-Claude Clévenot
- Born: 28 June 1994 (age 32) Royan, France
- Height: 1.99 m (6 ft 6 in)
- Weight: 89 kg (196 lb)
- Spike: 345 cm (136 in)
- Block: 326 cm (128 in)

Volleyball information
- Position: Outside hitter
- Current club: Ziraat Bankası Ankara
- Number: 17

Career
- Years: Team
- 2012–2016 2016–2018 2018–2020 2020–2021 2021–2023 2023–2024 2024–: Spacer's de Toulouse; Volley Piacenza; Power Volley Milano; Gas Sales Piacenza; Jastrzębski Węgiel; Warta Zawiercie; Ziraat Bankası Ankara

National team
- Years: Team
- –: France
Honours
Men's volleyball
Representing France
Olympic Games
Gold medal – first place	2020 Tokyo	Team
Gold medal – first place	2024 Paris	Team
FIVB World League
Gold medal – first place	2015 Rio de Janeiro
Gold medal – first place	2017 Curitiba
Bronze medal – third place	2016 Kraków
FIVB Nations League
Gold medal – first place	2022 Bologna
Gold medal – first place	2024 Łódź
Bronze medal – third place	2021 Rimini
CEV European Championship
Silver medal – second place	2026 Bulgaria/Finland/Italy/Romania
Mediterranean Games
Bronze medal – third place	2013 Mersin

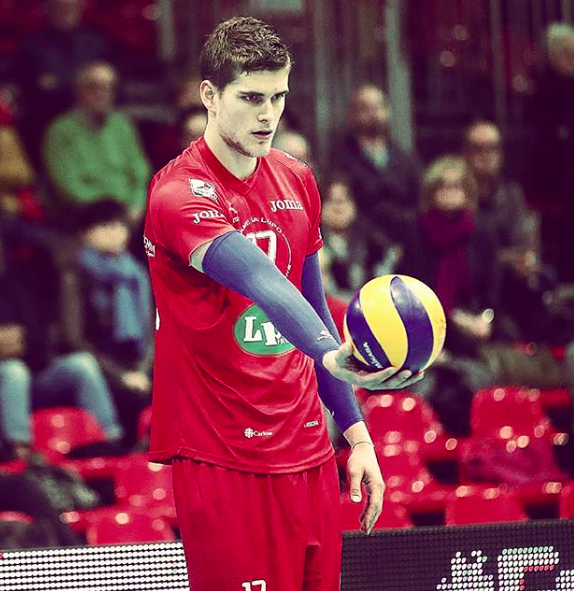
Clévenot in 2017

Trévor Gérard Jean-Claude Clévenot (French: [tʁevɔʁ klevəno]; born 28 June 1994) is a French professional volleyball player who plays as an outside hitter for Efeler Ligi club Ziraat Bankası Ankara and the France national team. Clévenot won a gold medal in the men's tournament at the Olympic Games Tokyo 2020 and is a two–time World League winner (2015, 2017).

== Personal life ==
He is the son of a former French volleyball player – Alain Clévenot.

== Honours ==
=== Club ===
- CEV Champions League
  - 2022–23 – with Jastrzębski Węgiel
- CEV Cup
  - 2024–25 – with Ziraat Bankası Ankara
- Domestic
  - 2021–22 Polish SuperCup, with Jastrzębski Węgiel
  - 2022–23 Polish SuperCup, with Jastrzębski Węgiel
  - 2022–23 Polish Championship, with Jastrzębski Węgiel
  - 2023–24 Polish Cup, with Aluron CMC Warta Zawiercie

=== Youth national team ===
- 2011 CEV U19 European Championship

=== Individual awards ===
- 2015: French Championship – Best receiver
- 2022: FIVB Nations League – Best outside spiker
- 2024: Olympic Games Paris – Best outside spiker

=== State awards ===
- 2021: Knight of the Legion of Honour

Awards
Preceded by (Brazil) Yoandy Leal (Poland) Michał Kubiak	Best Outside Spiker of FIVB Nations League; 2022 ex aequo (France) Earvin N'Gapeth	Succeeded by (Poland) Aleksander Śliwka (Japan) Yūki Ishikawa
