= Yacine Louati =

French volleyball player (born 1992)

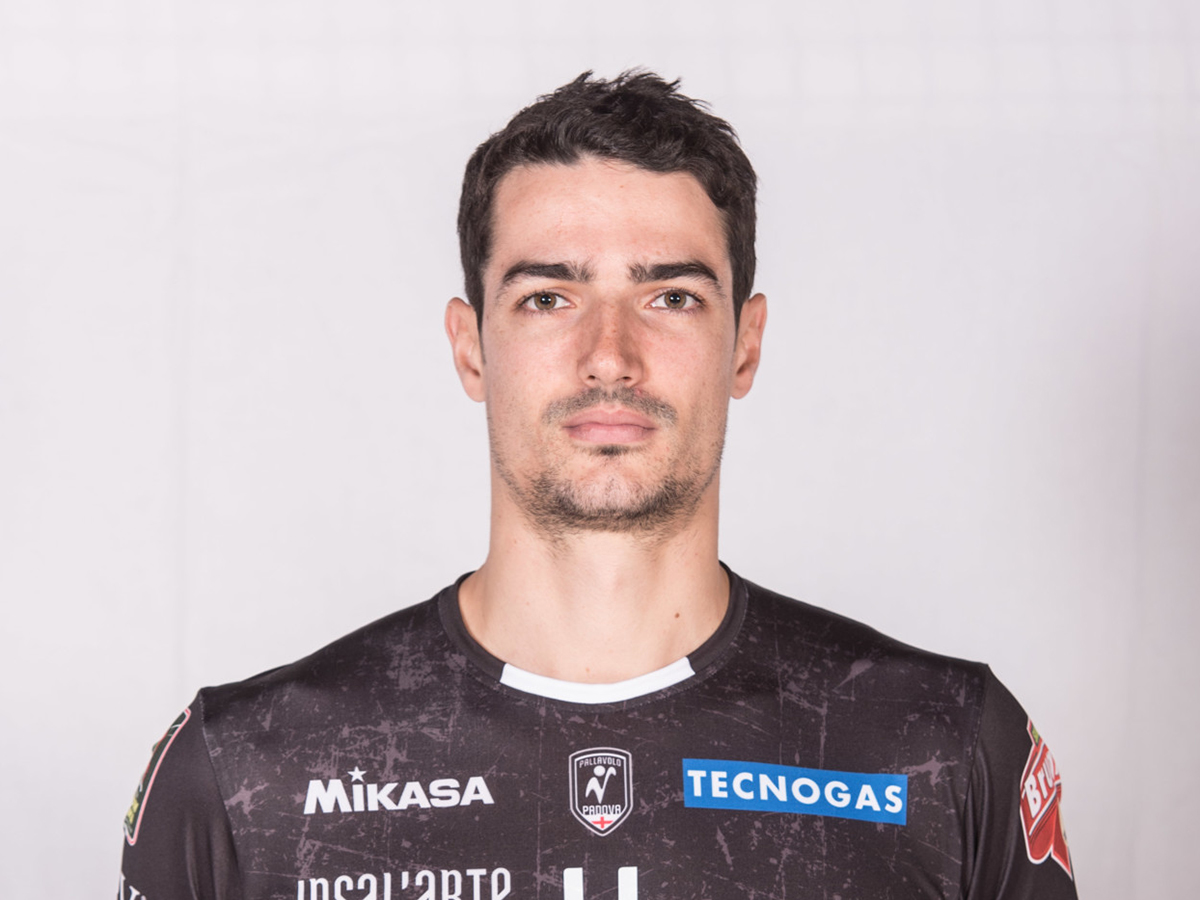
- Louati in 2019

Personal information
- Born: 4 March 1992 (age 34) Tourcoing, France
- Height: 1.98 m (6 ft 6 in)
- Weight: 92 kg (203 lb)
- Spike: 345 cm (136 in)
- Block: 320 cm (126 in)

Volleyball information
- Position: Outside hitter
- Current club: ChKS Chełm
- Number: 4

Career
- Years: Team
- 2011–2013 2013–2014 2014–2015 2015–2017 2017–2018 2018–2019 2019–2020 2020–2021 2021–2023 2023–2024 2024–2025 2025–2026 2026–: Tourcoing LM; Montpellier Volley; Volley Menen; Spacer's de Toulouse; Chaumont VB 52; Kioene Padova; Vero Volley Monza; Jastrzębski Węgiel; Fenerbahçe; Asseco Resovia; Allianz Milano; Asseco Resovia; ChKS Chełm

National team
- Years: Team
- 2015–: France
Honours
Men's volleyball
Representing France
Olympic Games
Gold medal – first place	2020 Tokyo	Team
Gold medal – first place	2024 Paris	Team
FIVB Nations League
Gold medal – first place	2022 Bologna
Gold medal – first place	2024 Łódź
Bronze medal – third place	2021 Rimini
Mediterranean Games
Bronze medal – third place	2013 Mersin

Yacine Louati (born 4 March 1992) is a French professional volleyball player who plays as an outside hitter for ChKS Chełm and the France national team. Louati is a two–time Olympic champion, winning gold at Tokyo 2020 and Paris 2024 Olympic Games.

== Personal life ==
Louati is of Tunisian descent through his father, Moutaa Louati, who was an international volleyball player for Tunisia.

== Honours ==
=== Club ===
- CEV Cup
  - 2023–24 – with Asseco Resovia
- Domestic
  - 2017–18 French SuperCup, with Chaumont VB 52
  - 2020–21 Polish Championship, with Jastrzębski Węgiel

=== Individual awards ===
- 2015: Belgian Championship – Best server
- 2018: French Championship – Best outside spiker
- 2023: Turkish Men's Volleyball League – Best receiver

=== State awards ===
- 2021: Knight of the Legion of Honour
