= Łukasz Kaczmarek =

Polish volleyball player (born 1994)

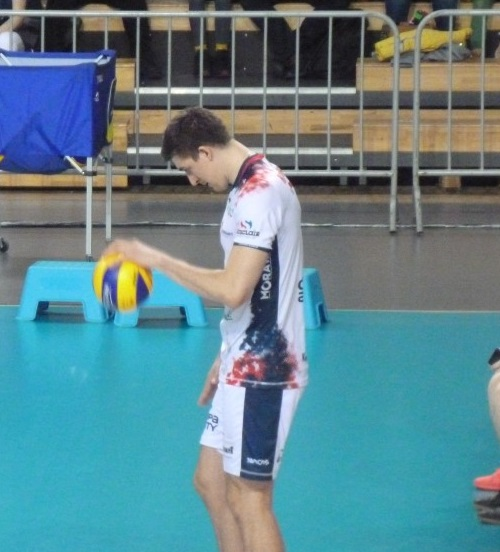
- Kaczmarek in 2019

Personal information
- Nickname: Zwierzak
- Born: 29 June 1994 (age 32) Krotoszyn, Poland
- Height: 2.04 m (6 ft 8 in)
- Weight: 99 kg (218 lb)
- Spike: 345 cm (136 in)
- Block: 332 cm (131 in)

Volleyball information
- Position: Opposite
- Current club: Asseco Resovia
- Number: 5

Career
- Years: Team
- 2013–2015 2015–2018 2018–2024 2024–2026 2026–: Victoria Wałbrzych; Cuprum Lubin; ZAKSA Kędzierzyn-Koźle; Jastrzębski Węgiel; Asseco Resovia

National team
- Years: Team
- 2017–: Poland
Honours
Men's volleyball
Representing Poland
Olympic Games
| Silver medal – second place | 2024 Paris | Team |
FIVB World Championship
| Silver medal – second place | 2022 Poland/Slovenia |
FIVB World Cup
| Silver medal – second place | 2019 Japan |
FIVB Nations League
| Gold medal – first place | 2023 Gdańsk |
| Silver medal – second place | 2021 Rimini |
| Bronze medal – third place | 2019 Chicago |
| Bronze medal – third place | 2022 Bologna |
| Bronze medal – third place | 2024 Łódź |
CEV European Championship
| Gold medal – first place | 2023 Italy/Bulgaria/North Macedonia/Israel |
| Bronze medal – third place | 2021 Poland/Czechia/Estonia/Finland |

Łukasz Kaczmarek (born 29 June 1994) is a Polish professional volleyball player who plays as an opposite spiker for Asseco Resovia and the Poland national team. Kaczmarek took part in the 2020 Summer Olympics in Tokyo and won silver at the 2024 Summer Olympics in Paris. He was a silver medallist with Poland at the 2022 World Championship. He is a three–time Champions League winner (2021, 2022, 2023) with ZAKSA.

== Career ==
Kaczmarek began his sporting career as a beach volleyball player. In 2015, he debuted in PlusLiga as Cuprum Lubin player. In 2016, he signed a new two–year contract with Cuprum Lubin, and became one of the best scorers in PlusLiga. In 2018, after the successful season and debut in the national team, he joined ZAKSA Kędzierzyn-Koźle.

On 10 August 2024, he won a silver medal at the 2024 Summer Olympic Games held in Paris.

== Honours ==
=== Club ===
- CEV Champions League
  - 2020–21 – with ZAKSA Kędzierzyn-Koźle
  - 2021–22 – with ZAKSA Kędzierzyn-Koźle
  - 2022–23 – with ZAKSA Kędzierzyn-Koźle
- Domestic
  - 2018–19 Polish Cup, with ZAKSA Kędzierzyn-Koźle
  - 2018–19 Polish Championship, with ZAKSA Kędzierzyn-Koźle
  - 2019–20 Polish SuperCup, with ZAKSA Kędzierzyn-Koźle
  - 2020–21 Polish SuperCup, with ZAKSA Kędzierzyn-Koźle
  - 2020–21 Polish Cup, with ZAKSA Kędzierzyn-Koźle
  - 2021–22 Polish Cup, with ZAKSA Kędzierzyn-Koźle
  - 2021–22 Polish Championship, with ZAKSA Kędzierzyn-Koźle
  - 2022–23 Polish Cup, with ZAKSA Kędzierzyn-Koźle
  - 2023–24 Polish SuperCup, with ZAKSA Kędzierzyn-Koźle
  - 2024–25 Polish Cup, with Jastrzębski Węgiel

=== Youth national team ===
- Beach volleyball
  - 2011 FIVB U19 World Championship, with Maciej Kosiak
  - 2011 CEV U18 European Championship, with Sebastian Kaczmarek
  - 2012 FIVB U19 World Championship, with Sebastian Kaczmarek
  - 2013 CEV U20 European Championship, with Sebastian Kaczmarek

=== Individual awards ===
- 2019: Polish Cup – Best opposite
- 2019: Polish SuperCup – Most valuable player
- 2023: FIVB Nations League – Best opposite spiker

=== State awards ===
- 2024: Knight's Cross of Polonia Restituta

Awards
| Preceded by (France) Jean Patry | Best Opposite Spiker of FIVB Nations League; 2023 | Succeeded by (France) Jean Patry |
