= Daryl Bultor =

French volleyball player (born 1995)

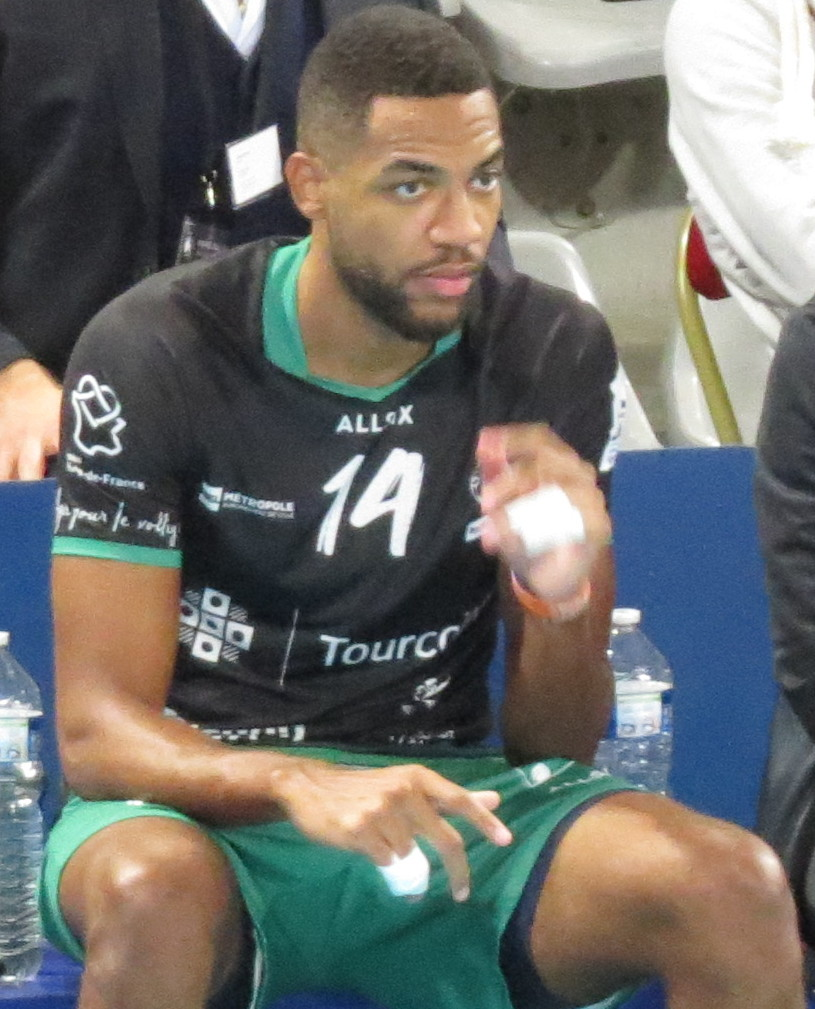
- Bultor in 2020

Personal information
- Nationality: French
- Born: 17 November 1995 (age 30); Basse-Terre
- Height: 1.97 m (6 ft 6 in)
- Weight: 94 kg (207 lb)
- Spike: 342 cm (135 in)
- Block: 317 cm (125 in)

Volleyball information
- Position: Middle blocker
- Current club: Tourcoing Lille Métropole
- Number: 13

Career
Years	Teams
2013–2018; 2018–2020; 2020–	(France) Montpellier UC (France) Arago de Sète (France) Tourcoing Lille Métropole

National team
France
Honours
Olympic Games
Gold medal – first place	2020 Tokyo	Team

Daryl Bultor (born 17 November 1995) is a French volleyball player for Tourcoing Lille Métropole and the French national team.

Bultor participated at the 2017 Men's European Volleyball Championship.
