= Earvin N'Gapeth =

French volleyball player (born 1991)

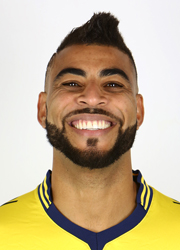
- N'Gapeth in 2018

Personal information
- Nationality: French
- Born: 12 February 1991 (age 35); Saint-Raphaël, France
- Height: 1.94 m (6 ft 4 in)
- Weight: 94 kg (207 lb)
- Spike: 358 cm (141 in)
- Block: 327 cm (129 in)

Volleyball information
- Position: Outside hitter

Career
Years	Teams
2008–2011; 2011–2013; 2013; 2014–2018; 2018–2021; 2021–2023; 2022; 2023–2024; 2024; 2024; 2024–2026	(France) Tours VB (Italy) Bre Banca Lannutti Cuneo (Russia) Kuzbass Kemerovo (Italy) Modena Volley (Russia) Zenit Kazan (Italy) Modena Volley (Iran) Paykan Tehran (loan) (Turkey) Halkbank (Indonesia) Jakarta Bhayangkara Presisi (France) Stade Poitevin Poitiers (Turkey) Fenerbahçe

National team
2010–	France
Honours
Men's volleyball
Representing France
Olympic Games
Gold medal – first place	2020 Tokyo	Team
Gold medal – first place	2024 Paris	Team
FIVB World League
Gold medal – first place	2015 Rio de Janeiro
Gold medal – first place	2017 Curitiba
Bronze medal – third place	2016 Kraków
FIVB Nations League
Gold medal – first place	2022 Bologna	Team
Gold medal – first place	2024 Łódź	Team
Silver medal – second place	2018 Lille	Team
Bronze medal – third place	2021 Rimini	Team
CEV European Championship
Gold medal – first place	2015 Italy/Bulgaria

Earvin N'Gapeth (born 12 February 1991) is a French professional volleyball player and represents France in international competitions. He has achieved numerous accolades, including the French league championship in 2010, the Italian league championship in 2016, and the European continental championship in 2015. N'Gapeth is a four-time gold medalist in the World League/Nations League (2015, 2017, 2022, 2024) and a two-time Olympic gold medalist (2020, 2024).

== Early life ==
N'Gapeth was born in Saint-Raphaël, France, and spent most of his childhood in the nearby commune of Fréjus. During his youth, he participated in both volleyball and football, initially showing a strong passion for football, where he played as a centre-forward. While living in Fréjus, he attended a football academy and played alongside French footballer Layvin Kurzawa. At age 11, his family relocated to Poitiers, a city with a more prominent volleyball community than football. Consequently, N'Gapeth shifted his focus from football to volleyball. He progressed quickly in the sport and turned professional in 2008, at the age of 17.

== Professional career ==
N'Gapeth began his professional volleyball career in the 2008–09 season when he signed with Tours VB, where he spent three seasons and won the Pro A league title in 2009–10. In 2011–12, he moved to Italy to join Piemonte Volley in Serie A1, playing two seasons and helping the team reach the CEV Champions League final in 2012–13 as runners-up. The following season, he transferred to Kuzbass Kemerovo in the Russian Super League but left mid-season to return to Italy with Modena Volley. During his tenure at Modena, N'Gapeth won the Italian Cup and Italian SuperCup in 2014–15, and the Italian Championship, Italian Cup, and Italian SuperCup in 2015–16. After four seasons with Modena, he returned to Russia to play for Zenit Kazan in the Russian Super League until 2021.

== National team career ==
On 6 October 2010, N'Gapeth was expelled from the French national volleyball team on disciplinary grounds during the World Championship in Italy following an incident in which he insulted then-coach Philippe Blain. Despite this setback, he returned to the national team for the 2011 European Championship. In 2014, N'Gapeth competed at the World Championship held in Poland, where France finished fourth after losing the bronze medal match to Germany. He played a key role in France’s victorious 2015 World League campaign. On 18 October 2015, he contributed to France’s European Championship triumph with a straight-sets 3–0 win over Slovenia in the final. In 2017, N'Gapeth was named Most Valuable Player of the World League, leading France to win the gold medal.

== Awards and honors ==
=== Clubs ===
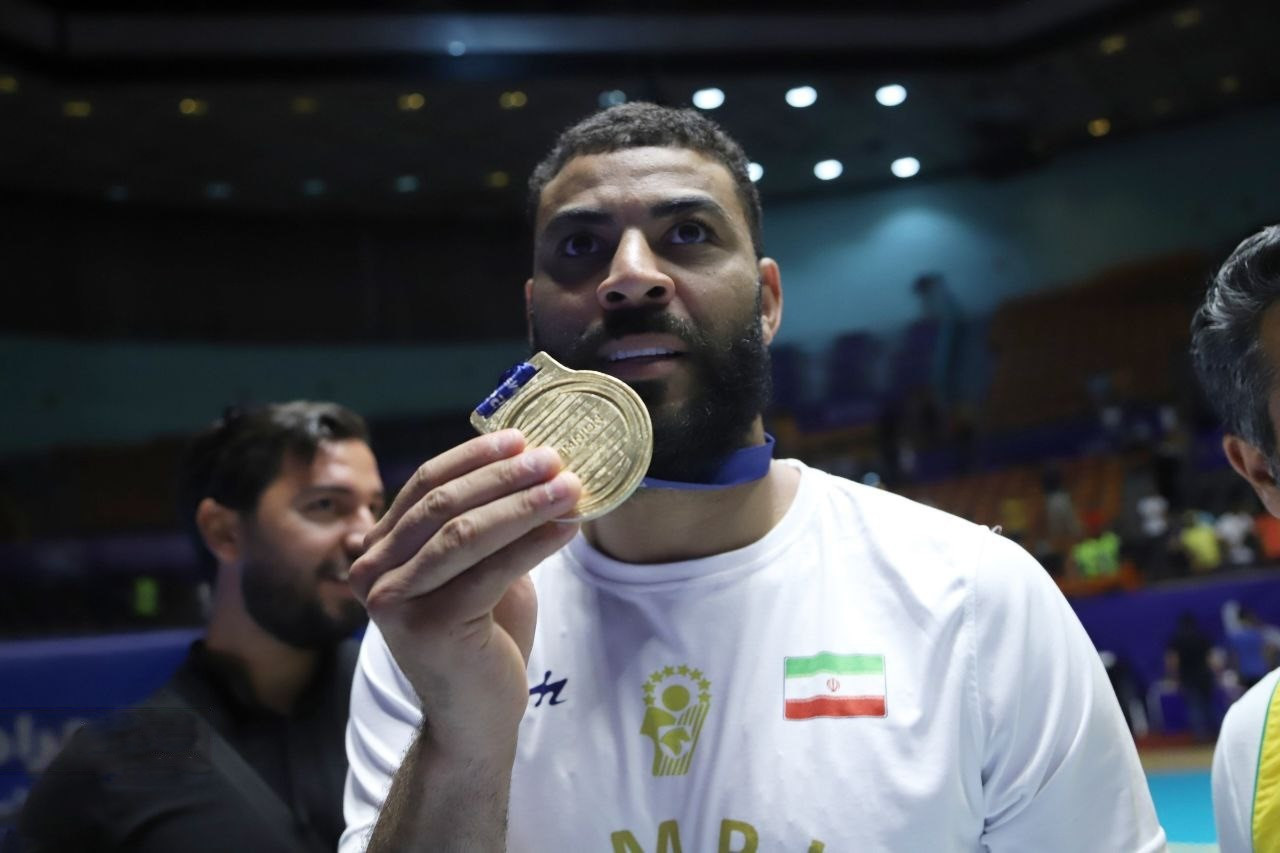
N'Gapeth with the Asian Championship Medal with Paykan Tehran VC in Tehran, Iran

- CEV Champions League
  - 2012/2013 – with Bre Banca Lannutti Cuneo
  - 2018/2019 – with Zenit Kazan
  - 2020/2021 – with Zenit Kazan
- CEV Cup
  - 2022/2023 – with Valsa Group Modena
- Asian Club Championship
  - 2022 Iran – with Paykan Tehran VC
  - 2024 Iran – with Jakarta Presisi
- FIVB Club World Championship
  - Betim 2019 – with Zenit Kazan
- National Championships
  - 2008/2009 French Cup, with Tours VB
  - 2009/2010 French Championship, with Tours VB
  - 2009/2010 French Cup, with Tours VB
  - 2010/2011 French Cup, with Tours VB
  - 2011/2012 Italian Championship, with Modena Volley
  - 2011/2012 Italian SuperCup, with Modena Volley
  - 2014/2015 Italian Championship, with Parmareggio Modena
  - 2014/2015 Italian Cup, with Parmareggio Modena
  - 2015/2016 Italian Championship, with DHL Modena
  - 2015/2016 Italian Cup, with DHL Modena
  - 2015/2016 Italian SuperCup, with DHL Modena
  - 2016/2017 Italian SuperCup, with DHL Modena
  - 2017/2018 Italian Championship, with DHL Modena
  - 2018/2019 Russian Super League, with Zenit Kazan
  - 2018/2019 Russian Cup, with Zenit Kazan
  - 2018/2019 Russian SuperCup, with Zenit Kazan
  - 2019/2020 Russian Super League, with Zenit Kazan
  - 2019/2020 Russian Cup, with Zenit Kazan
  - 2020/2021 Russian SuperCup, with Zenit Kazan
  - 2021/2022 Iranian Super League, with Paykan Tehran
  - 2023/2024 Turkish Volleyball League, with Halkbank
  - 2023/2024 Turkish Cup, with Halkbank
  - 2023/2024 Turkish Super Cup, with Halkbank
  - 2023/2024 Indonesian Proliga, with Jakarta Bhayangkara Presisi
  - 2024/2025 Turkish Cup, with Fenerbahçe

=== National team ===
- 2015 Volleyball World League
- 2015 European Championship
- 2016 Volleyball World League
- 2017 Volleyball World League
- 2018 Volleyball Nations League
- 2021 Volleyball Nations League
- 2020 Olympic Games
- 2022 Volleyball Nations League
- 2024 Volleyball Nations League
- 2024 Olympic Games

=== Youth national team ===
- 2007 CEV U19 European Championship
- 2008 CEV U20 European Championship
- 2009 CEV U19 European Championship

=== Individual awards ===
- 2008: CEV U20 European Championship – Most Valuable Player
- 2009: CEV U19 European Championship – Best Server
- 2009: CEV U19 European Championship – Most Valuable Player
- 2011: French Championship – Best Receiver
- 2011: French Championship – Most Valuable Player
- 2015: Italian Cup – Most Valuable Player
- 2015: FIVB World League – Best Outside Spiker
- 2015: FIVB World League – Most Valuable Player
- 2015: CEV European Championship – Best Outside Spiker
- 2016: Italian Championship – Best Player
- 2016: European Confederation Gala – Most Spectacular Player
- 2017: FIVB World League – Best Outside Spiker
- 2017: FIVB World League – Most Valuable Player
- 2021: Olympic Games Tokyo – Most Valuable Player and Best Outside Spiker
- 2022: Asian Club Championship – Best Outside Spiker
- 2022: FIVB Nations League – Most Valuable Player and Best Outside Spiker
- 2024: Olympic Games Paris – Most Valuable Player and Best Outside Spiker
- 2025: Turkish Cup – Most Valuable Player

== Endorsements ==
N'Gapeth is sponsored by Adidas.

== Legal issues ==
In December 2014, N'Gapeth was given a suspended sentence of three months' imprisonment by the Montpellier criminal court for his involvement in a nightclub brawl in August 2013.

In July 2015, N'Gapeth was arrested following an incident at Paris Montparnasse station involving an alleged assault on a TGV train conductor. N'Gapeth and his brother were waiting for a friend when N'Gapeth requested to delay the train’s departure. The conductor accused N'Gapeth’s brother of blocking the train door, leading to an argument during which N'Gapeth allegedly insulted and struck the conductor, causing minor injuries. It was also reported that N'Gapeth threw a newspaper at the conductor's face. In April 2016, N'Gapeth was sentenced to a three-month suspended prison term and fined €3,000. However, in March 2018, the Court of Appeal of Paris acquitted N'Gapeth of all charges related to the incident.

In November 2015, N'Gapeth was involved in a hit-and-run incident outside the Frozen Club in Modena, Italy, which resulted in injuries to three pedestrians. Two victims sustained minor injuries, while one was critically injured and hospitalized. N'Gapeth fled the scene but later turned himself in to the Italian authorities by voluntarily going to the prosecutor's office to confess. Following the incident, Modena Volley imposed a temporary suspension on him for several games. In May 2018, he pleaded guilty before a judge in Modena and was sentenced to a one-year suspended prison term along with a suspended driving license.

In December 2017, N'Gapeth was stopped by Modena traffic police during a routine check and found to be driving under the influence of alcohol. Following an evening spent at a wine bar and the Frozen Club in Modena, Italy, with his teammates, he was measured to have a blood alcohol level of 1.98 g/L, nearly four times the Italian legal limit of 0.50 g/L. As a result, his driver's license was immediately revoked, and the car he was traveling in was towed away.

In December 2019, N'Gapeth was arrested in Belo Horizonte, Brazil, following allegations of sexual assault. A woman accused him of slapping her buttocks during a party at a local nightclub. N'Gapeth told authorities that he believed the woman was a friend and that he did not intend to cause harm. He was held in custody for over 24 hours before being released on bail set at €10,000. Following the incident, the French Ministry of Sports removed N'Gapeth from a video campaign against sexual violence, citing precautionary measures despite his presumption of innocence.

== Personal life ==
N'Gapeth is of Cameroonian descent through his father, Éric N'Gapeth, who was born in Cameroon and represented France in volleyball at the Seoul 1988 Summer Olympics.

N'Gapeth was named after basketball player Earvin "Magic" Johnson by his father, who has long been an avid basketball fan.

N'Gapeth has described his volleyball career as highly fulfilling, expressing no regrets about choosing volleyball over football. He noted that the life of a professional footballer appears more complex, with greater pressure and heightened media scrutiny. Nevertheless, he has expressed a desire to have continued playing football for a longer period, as he finds the sport itself genuinely engaging. Outside of his volleyball career, N'Gapeth maintains his passion for football by playing FIFA on his PlayStation and organizing informal matches with friends at local football pitches during his spare time.

N'Gapeth supports Paris Saint-Germain as his favorite football club and cites Zinedine Zidane as his favorite footballer.

Awards
Preceded by (Brazil) Sérgio Santos	Most Valuable Player; Olympic Games; Tokyo 2020; Paris 2024	Succeeded by TBD
Preceded by (Brazil) Ricardo Lucarelli Souza (United States) Aaron Russell	Best Outside Spiker of Olympic Games; Tokyo 2020 (with (Russia) Egor Kliuka); Paris 2024 (with (France) Trévor Clévenot)	Succeeded by TBD
Preceded by (Brazil) Wallace de Souza (Poland) Bartosz Kurek	Most Valuable Player; FIVB Nations League; Bologna 2022	Succeeded by (Poland) Paweł Zatorski
Preceded by (Brazil) Yoandy Leal (Poland) Michał Kubiak	Best Outside Spiker of FIVB Nations League; Bologna 2022 (with (France) Trévor Clévenot)	Succeeded by (Poland) Aleksander Śliwka (Japan) Yūki Ishikawa
Preceded by (United States) Taylor Sander	Most Valuable Player; FIVB World League; Rio de Janeiro 2015	Succeeded by (Serbia) Marko Ivović
Preceded by (United States) Taylor Sander (Brazil) Ricardo Lucarelli	Best Outside Spiker of FIVB World League; Rio de Janeiro 2015 (with (Poland) Michał Kubiak)	Succeeded by (Serbia) Marko Ivović (France) Antonin Rouzier
Preceded by (Serbia) Marko Ivović	Most Valuable Player; FIVB World League; Curitiba 2017	Succeeded by (Russia) Maxim Mikhaylov
Preceded by (Serbia) Marko Ivović (France) Antonin Rouzier	Best Outside Spiker of FIVB World League; Curitiba 2017 (with (Brazil) Ricardo Lucarelli)	Succeeded by (United States) Taylor Sander (Russia) Dmitry Volkov
