= Antoine Brizard =

French volleyball player (born 1994)

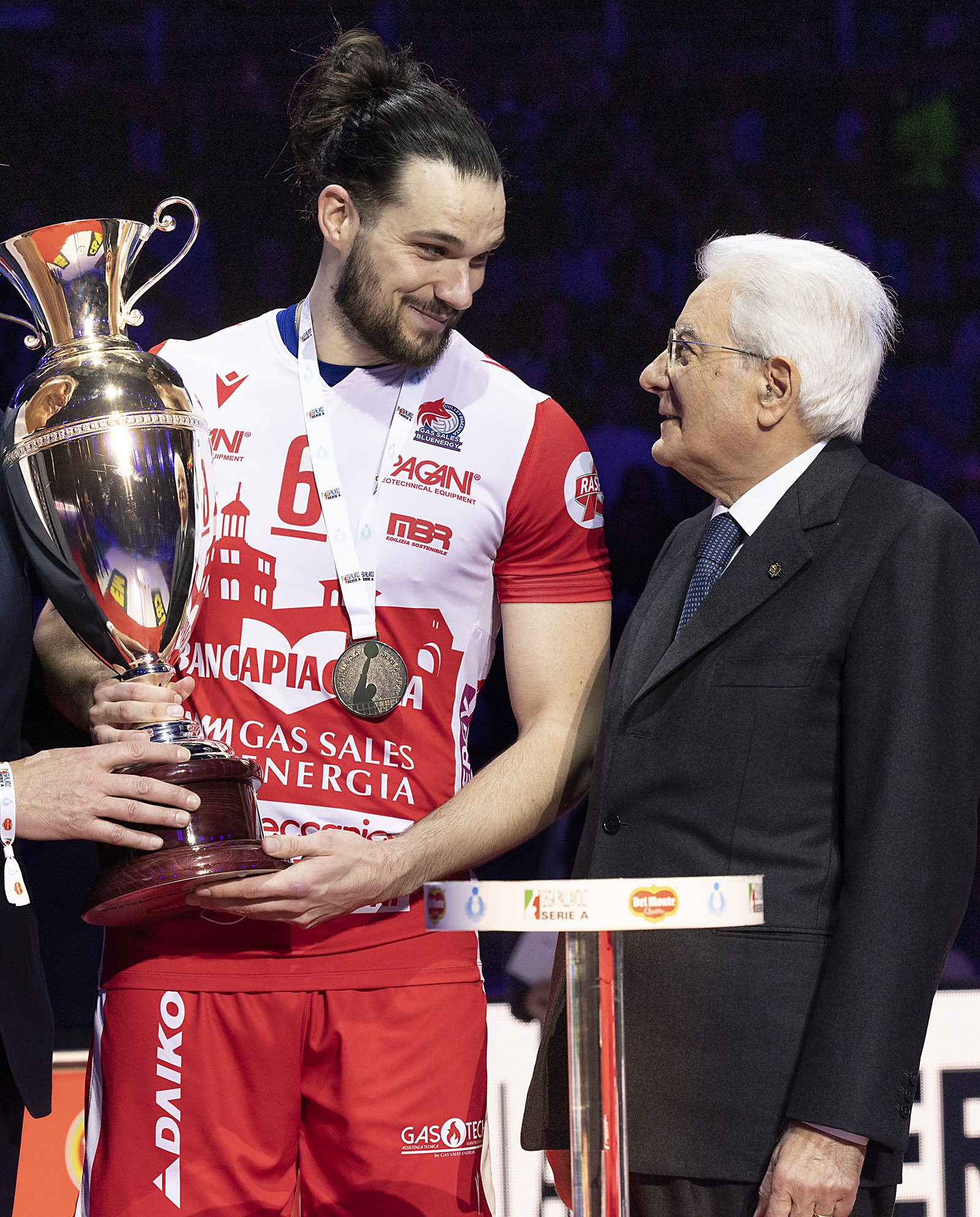
- Brizard with the Italian Cup trophy in 2023

Personal information
- Full name: Antoine Arthur Fabien Brizard
- Born: 22 May 1994 (age 32); Poitiers, France
- Height: 1.96 m (6 ft 5 in)
- Weight: 96 kg (212 lb)
- Spike: 340 cm (134 in)
- Block: 310 cm (122 in)

Volleyball information
- Position: Setter
- Current club: Osaka Bluteon
- Number: 6

Career
Years	Teams
2012–2015; 2015–2017; 2017–2020; 2020–2021; 2021–2025; 2025–	Paris Volley; Spacer's de Toulouse; Projekt Warsaw; Zenit Saint Petersburg; Gas Sales Piacenza; Osaka Bluteon

National team
2017–	France
Honours
Men's volleyball
Representing France
Olympic Games
Gold medal – first place	2020 Tokyo	Team
Gold medal – first place	2024 Paris	Team
FIVB World League
Gold medal – first place	2017 Curitiba
FIVB Nations League
Gold medal – first place	2022 Bologna
Gold medal – first place	2024 Łódź
Silver medal – second place	2018 Lille
Bronze medal – third place	2021 Rimini
CEV European Championship
Silver medal – second place	2026 Bulgaria/Finland/Italy/Romania

Antoine Arthur Fabien Brizard (born 22 May 1994) is a French professional volleyball player who plays as a setter for SV League club Osaka Bluteon and the France national team, which he captains. Brizard has won two gold medals in the men's tournament at the Olympic Games Tokyo 2020 and Paris 2024.

== Honours ==
=== Club ===
- CEV Cup
  - 2013–14 – with Paris Volley
  - 2020–21 – with Zenit Saint Petersburg
- Domestic
  - 2012–13 French Championship, with Paris Volley
  - 2013–14 French SuperCup, with Paris Volley
  - 2013–14 French Championship, with Paris Volley
  - 2014–15 French Championship, with Paris Volley
  - 2016–17 French Championship, with Spacer's de Toulouse
  - 2018–19 Polish Championship, with Onico Warsaw
  - 2022–23 Italian Cup, with Gas Sales Piacenza
  - 2025-26 Japanese Championship, with Osaka Bluteon

=== Youth national team ===
- 2011 CEV U19 European Championship

=== Individual awards ===
- 2011: FIVB U19 World Championship – Best setter
- 2024: FIVB Nations League – Most valuable player
- 2024: FIVB Nations League – Best setter
- 2024: Olympic Games Paris – Best setter
- 2026: CEV European Championship – Best setter

=== State awards ===
- 2021: Knight of the Legion of Honour
