= Captain (volleyball) =

Team captain of a volleyball team

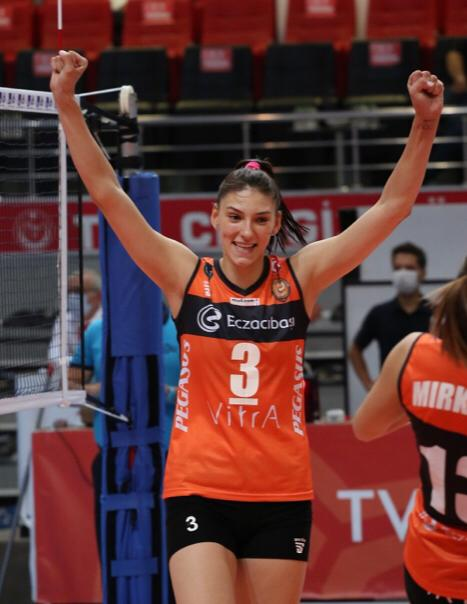
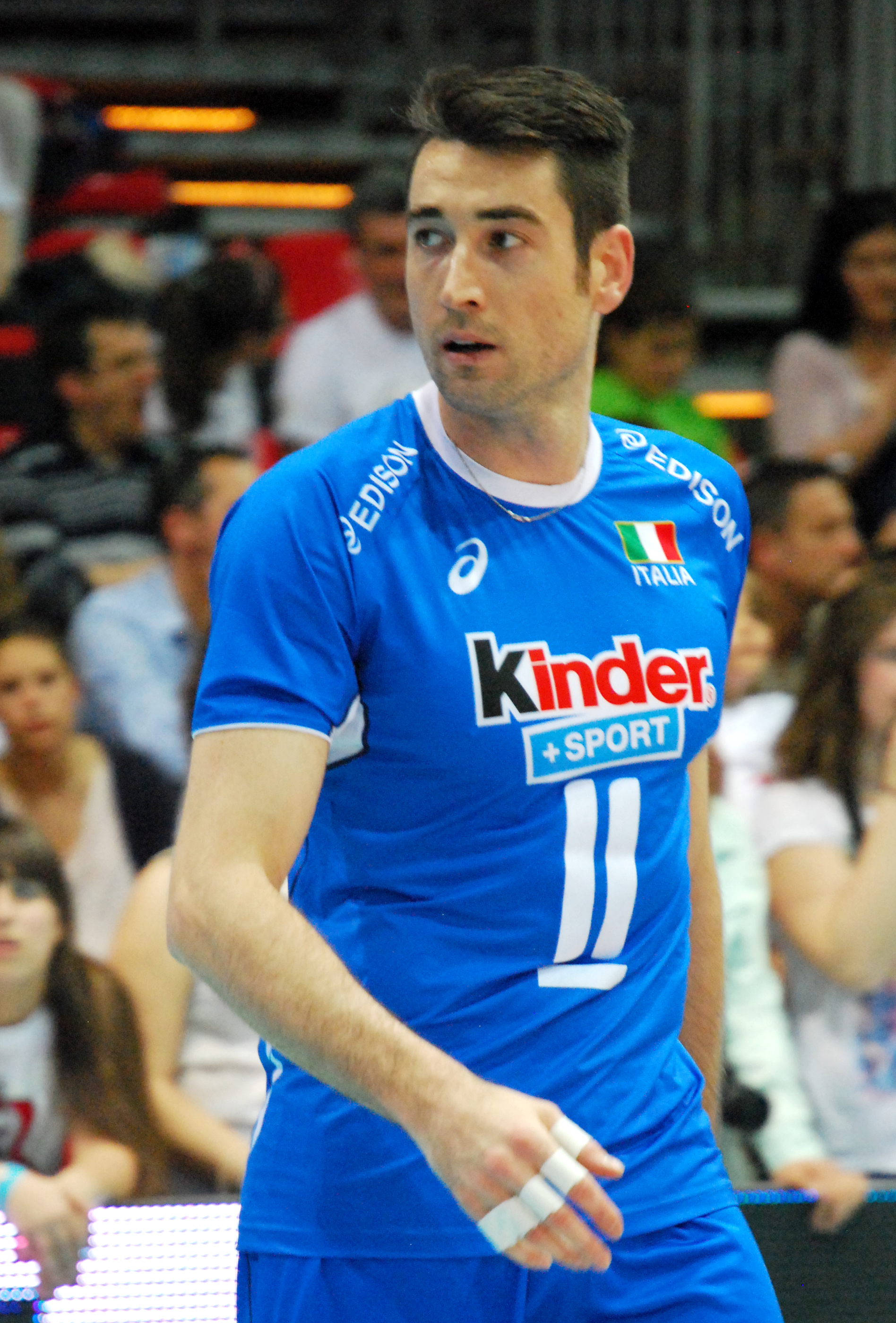
Tijana Bošković and Cristian Savani, with the captain's stripe on jersey

The captain of a volleyball team is a team member chosen to be the on-court leader of the team; they are often one of the older or more experienced members of the squad, or a player that can heavily influence a game or has good leadership qualities. Coaches often choose one or two "captains" for their team, which designates them as both a symbolic and verbal leader on the court. The player chosen is someone who has the ability to be a liaison between the coaches, players and referee. This person must be assertive, persuasive and level-headed.

The team captain is usually identified by the 8x2cm stripe under jersey number. Team captain is also indicated on the game score sheet.

Liberos can also be either team or game captain. Responsibilities and rules regarding volleyball captain are regulated by official FIVB rulebook, which is followed by all federations.

== Responsibilities ==
Team captain is responsible for the conduct and discipline of their team members.

Prior to the match, the team captain represents his/her team in the toss, then signs the score sheet. During the match and while on the court, the team captain is the game captain. Captain can requests separate (consecutive) official warm-ups at the net and the teams are allowed 3 minutes or 5 minutes each warm-up.

When the team captain is not on the court, the coach or the team captain must assign another player on the court, to assume the role of game captain. This game captain maintains his/her responsibilities until he/she is substituted, or the team captain returns to play, or the set ends. Only the game captain is authorized to speak to the referees to ask for an explanation on the application or interpretation of the rules, or to submit the requests or questions of his/her teammates. Regular game interruptions can also be requested by captain. If the game captain does not agree with the explanation of the 1st referee, he/she may choose to protest against such decision and immediately indicates to the 1st referee that he/she reserves the right to record an official protest on the score sheet at the end of the match. Captain can also speak to referee to ask authorization to change all or part of the equipment, to verify the positions of the teams or to check the floor, the net, the ball, etc. In the absence of the coach captain has right to request time-outs and substitutions.

At the end of the match, the team captain thanks the referees and signs the score sheet to ratify result. Captain may, when it has been notified in due time to the 1st referee, confirm and record on the score sheet an official protest regarding the referee’s application or interpretation of the rules.

Game captain also confirms to the referee if assistant coach assumed the head coach's functions for the duration of the absence of the coach.

== See also ==
- Captain (sports)
