= Sjøli =

Sjøli is a Norwegian surname. Notable people with the surname include:

- Hans Petter Sjøli (born 1974), Norwegian journalist and author
- Knut Sjøli (1877–1955), Norwegian politician
- Sonja Irene Sjøli (born 1949), Norwegian politician

== See also ==
- Sjøli Church
- Sjölin
