= 2018 FIVB Men's Volleyball World Championship =

Nineteenth staging of FIVB Men's Volleyball World Championship

2018 FIVB Men's World Championship
Campionato mondiale di pallavolo maschile Italia/Bulgaria 2018 Световно първенство по волейбол за мъже Италия/България 2018

Tournament details
- Host countries: Italy; Bulgaria
- Dates: 9–30 September
- Teams: 24 (from 5 confederations)
- Venue: 9 (in 9 host cities)
- Officially opened by: Sergio Mattarella and Rumen Radev

Final positions
- Champions: Poland (3rd title)
- Runners-up: Brazil
- Third place: United States
- Fourth place: Serbia

Tournament awards
- MVP: (Poland) Bartosz Kurek
- Best Setter: (United States) Micah Christenson
- Best OH: (Poland) Michał Kubiak (Brazil) Douglas Souza
- Best MB: (Brazil) Lucas Saatkamp (Poland) Piotr Nowakowski
- Best OPP: (United States) Matt Anderson
- Best Libero: (Poland) Paweł Zatorski

Tournament statistics
- Matches played: 94
- Attendance: 389,029 (4,139 per match)
- Best scorer: (Poland) Bartosz Kurek (171 points)
- Best attacker: (Brazil) Douglas Souza (56.58%)
- Best spiker: (Brazil) Douglas Souza (56.58%)
- Best blocker: (Poland) Bartosz Kurek (0.48 Avg)
- Best server: (Serbia) Marko Ivović (0.36 Avg)
- Best setter: (United States) Micah Christenson (6.51 Avg)
- Best digger: (United States) Erik Shoji (1.64 Avg)
- Best receiver: (United States) Taylor Sander (34.78%)

The 2018 FIVB Men's Volleyball World Championship was the 19th staging of the FIVB Men's Volleyball World Championship, contested by the senior men's national teams of the members of the Fédération Internationale de Volleyball (FIVB), the sport's global governing body. The final tournament was held in Italy and Bulgaria from 9 to 30 September 2018. For the first time, the tournament was jointly-hosted by more than one country. The final six was hosted by Italy at the Pala Alpitour in Turin.

Poland defended their world title, defeating the reigning Olympic champions Brazil in straight sets at a repeat of the 2014 final. This was Poland's third title overall, and the third time in the last four editions of the World Championship that Brazil and Poland contested the final. This was also the fifth straight World Championship with Brazil reaching at least the final. United States won the 3rd place match, defeating Serbia in four sets. Bartosz Kurek from Poland was elected the MVP.

The first round match between Russia and Tunisia set the new all-time lowest-scoring record in a World Championship set since the new volleyball scoring rules were adopted, with Russia winning the second set by 25–6. The previous record was a 25–8 achieved by United States against Puerto Rico during the 2014 World Championship.

== Host selection ==
On 9 December 2015, FIVB announced that the tournament would be held in Italy and Bulgaria. For the first time the championship will take place in more than one country. The tournament will take place in six Italian cities (Bari, Bologna, Florence, Assago, Rome and Turin) and three Bulgarian cities (Ruse, Varna and Sofia).

Both Italy and Bulgaria have previously hosted the Men's World Championship. Italy last organised the 2010 edition, when Brazil claimed the title their third straight title. Italy also hosted the men's event in 1978 as well as the 2014 Women's World Championship. Moreover, Italy hosted the 1985 Men's U21 World Championship, the 1985 Women's U20 World Championship and the 2009 Boys' U19 World Championship. Bulgaria, on the other hand, hosted both the men's and women's senior editions in 1970. Both countries have also played hosts to other important volleyball competitions, including the Men's European Volleyball Championship and the World League final round.

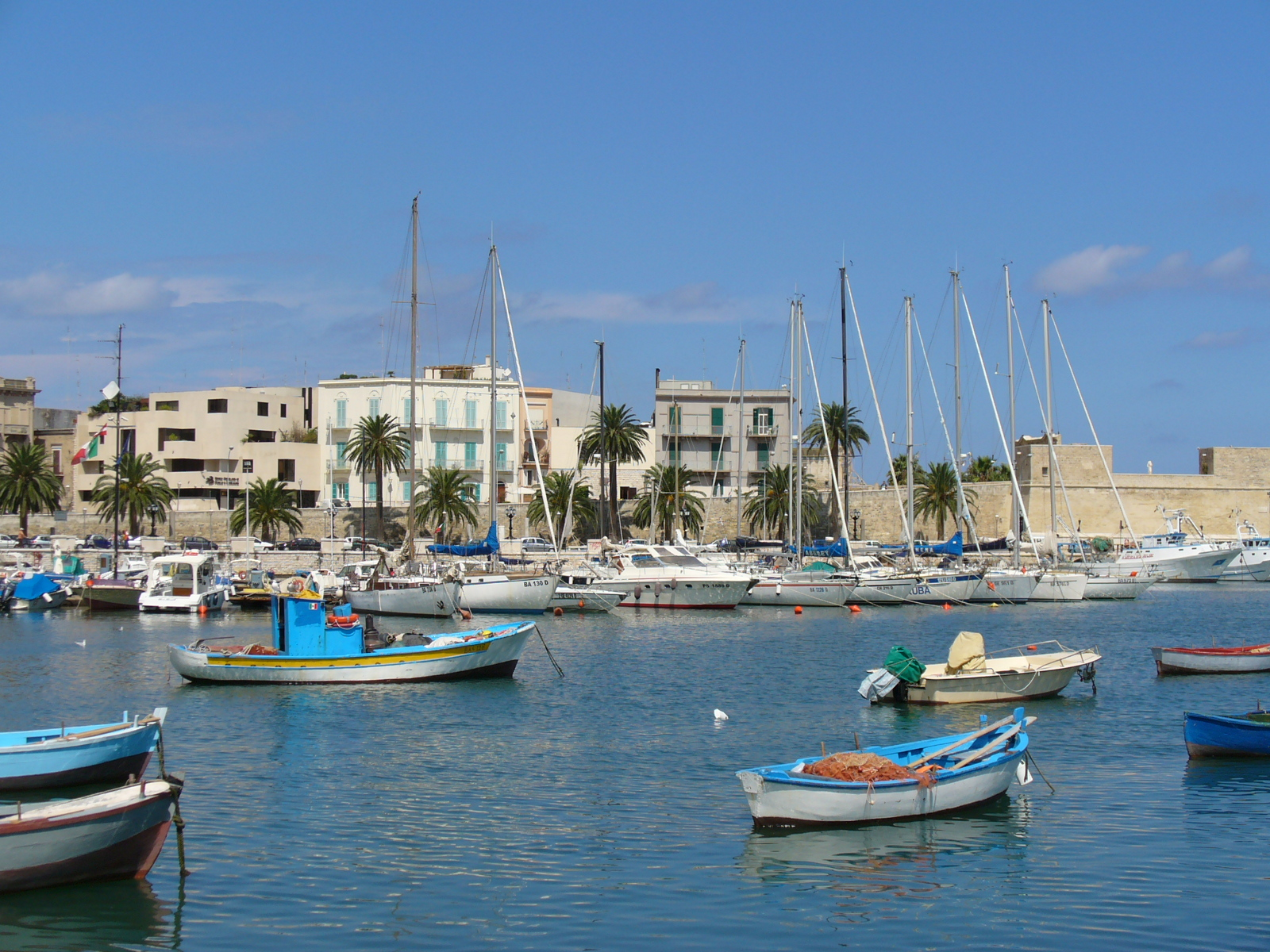
Bari

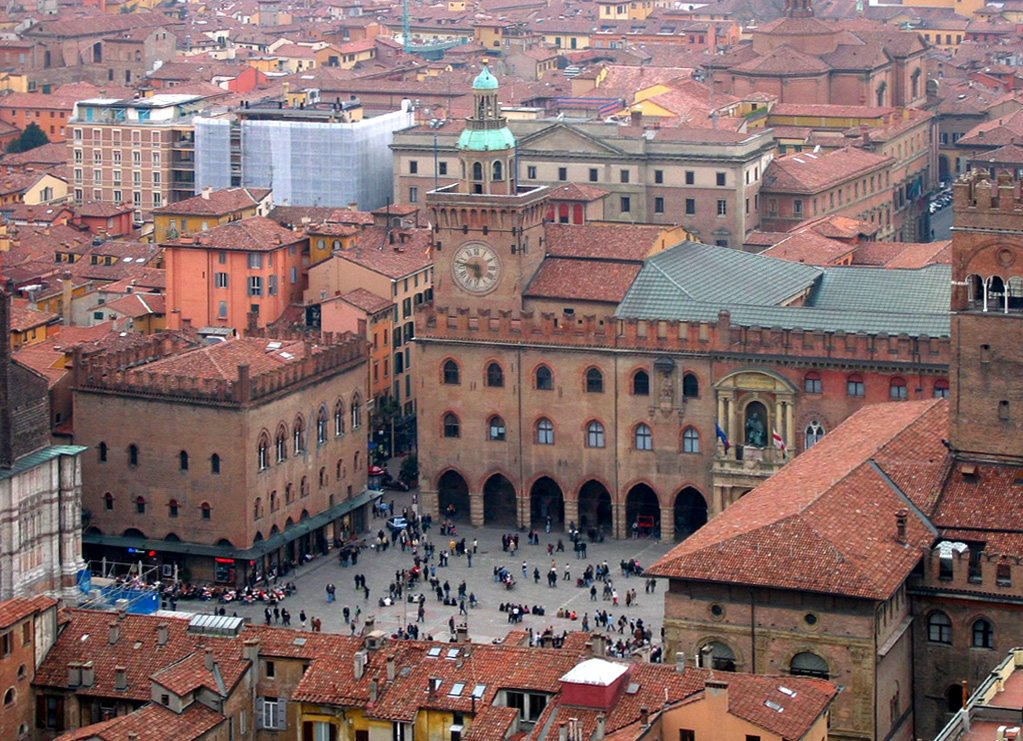
Bologna

Florence

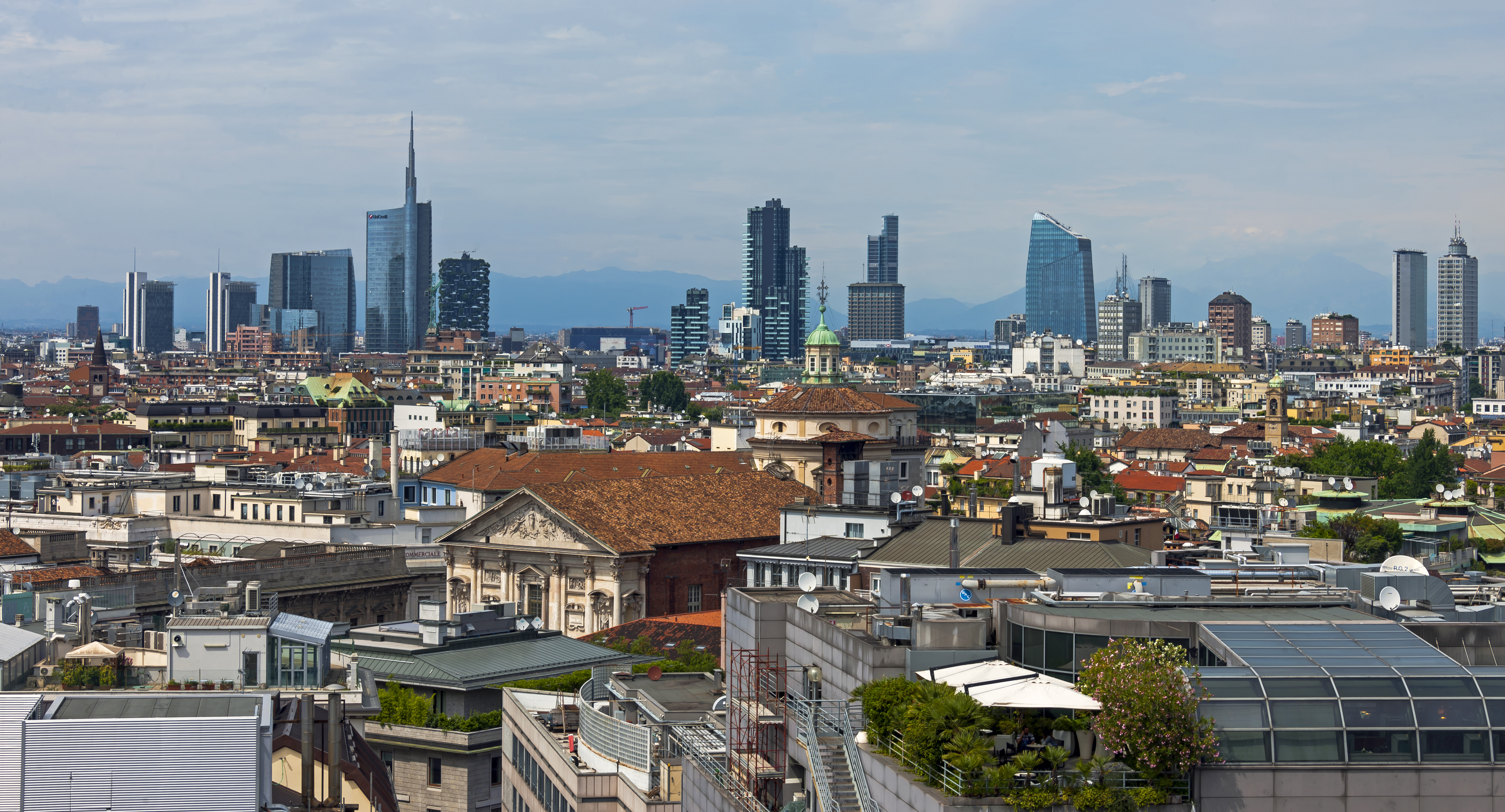
Assago, Milan

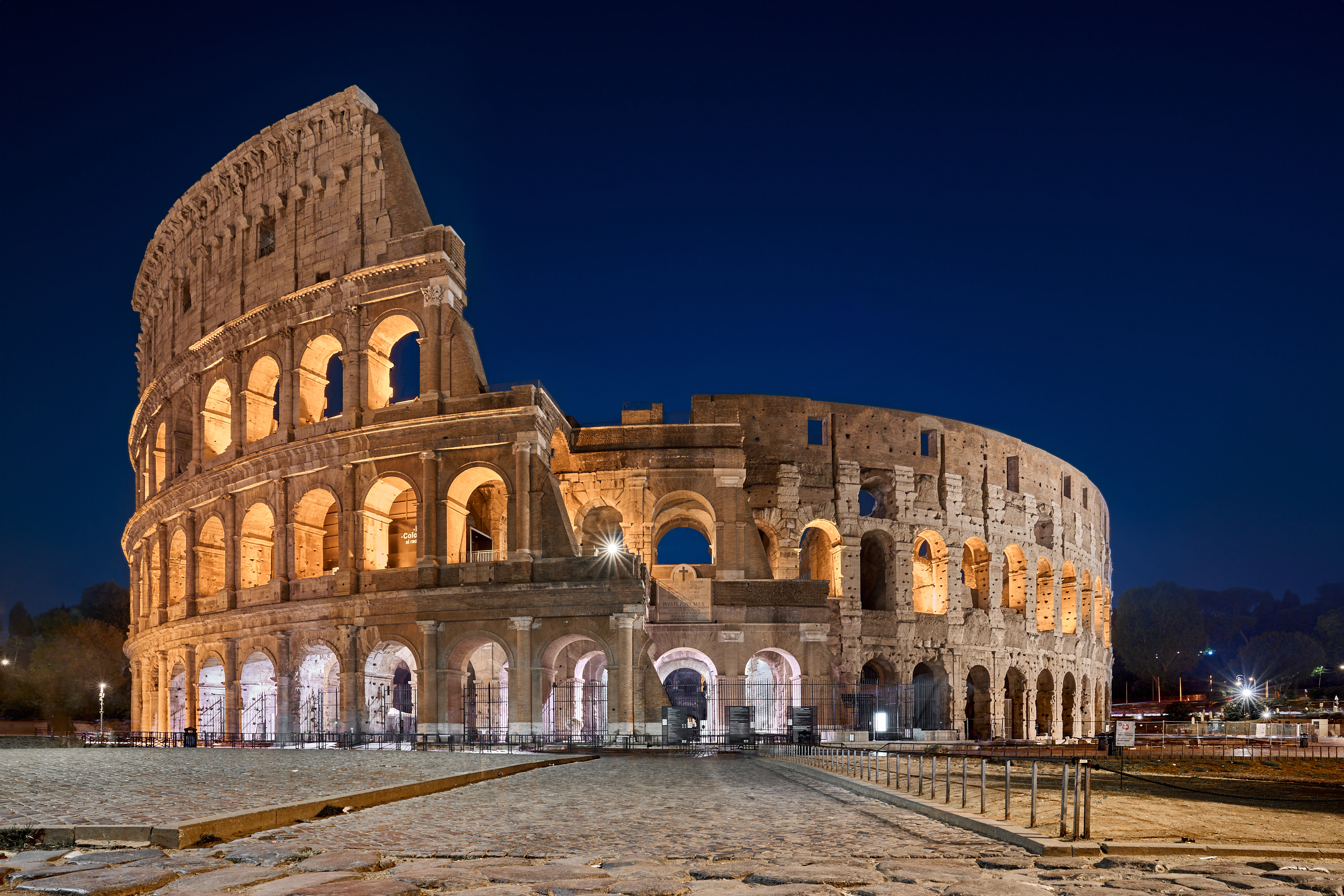
Rome

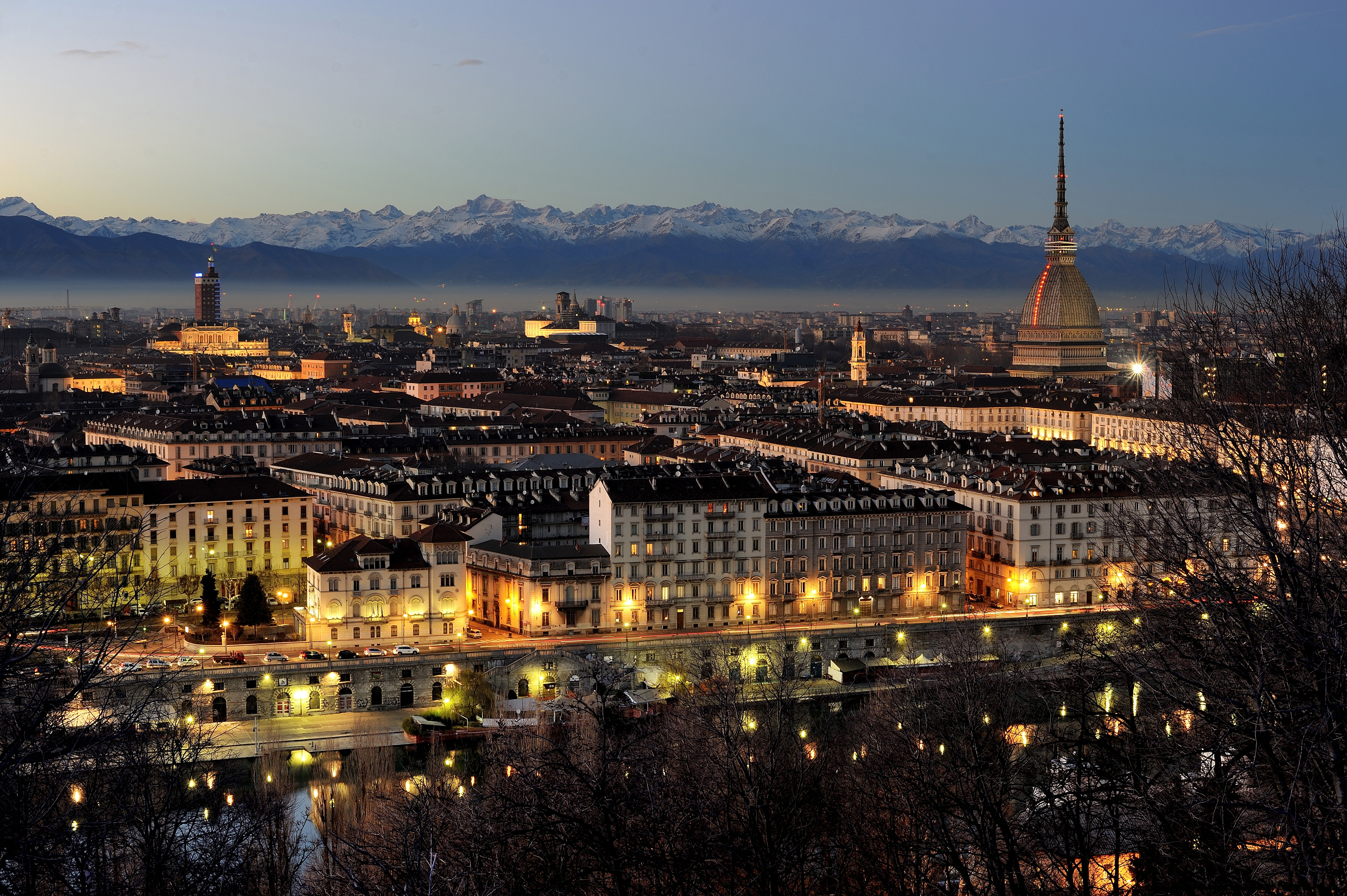
Turin

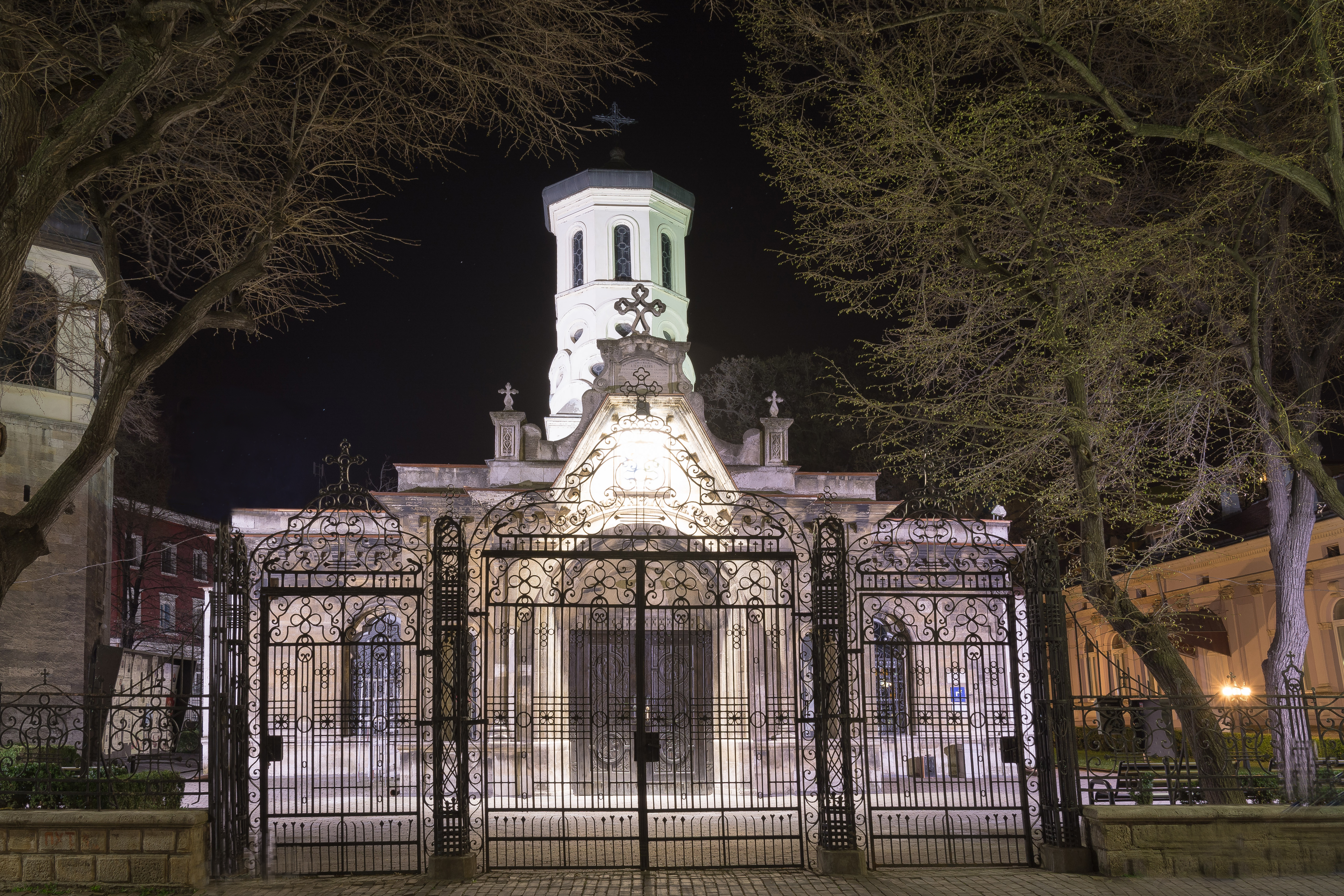
Ruse

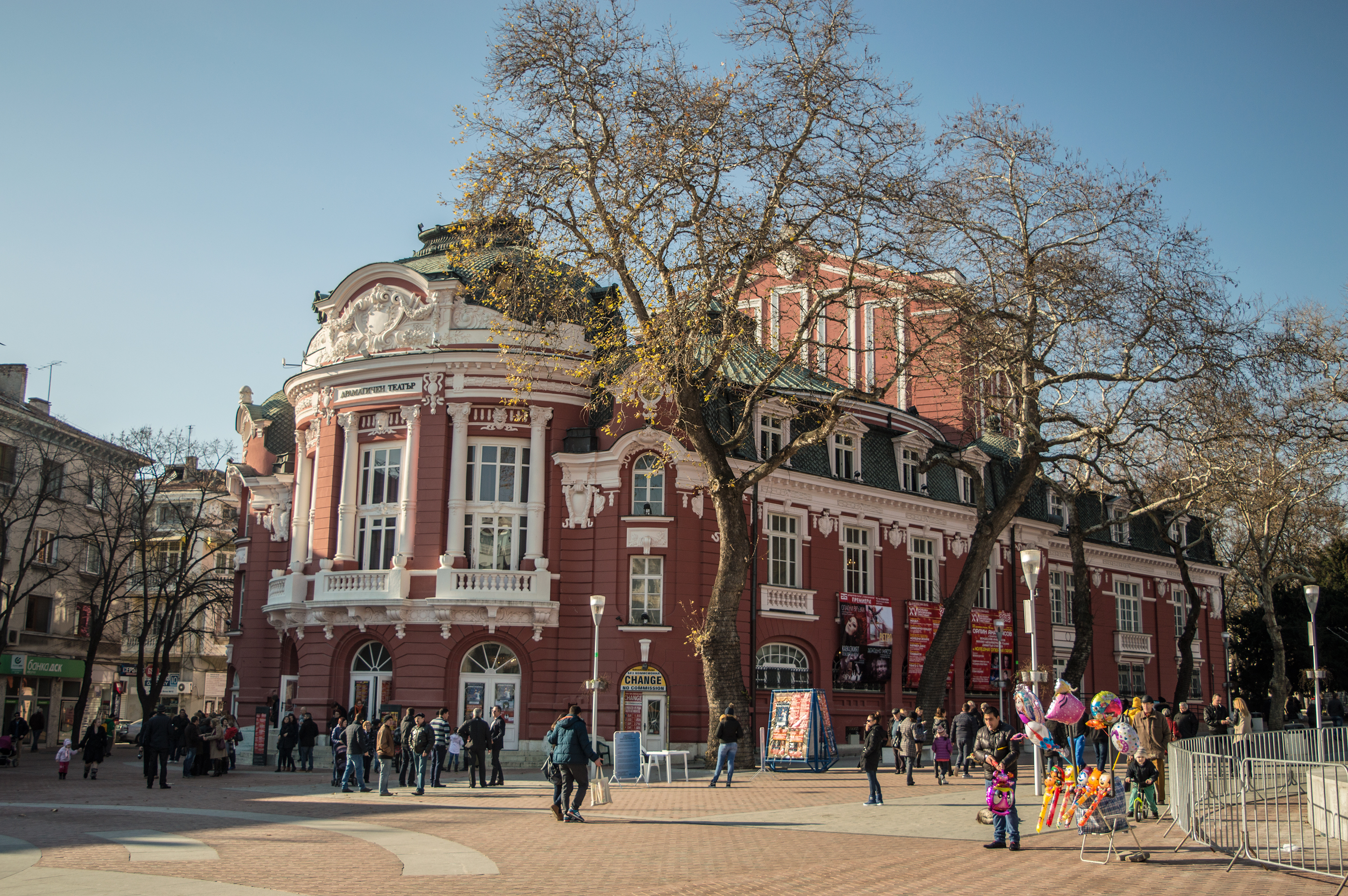
Varna

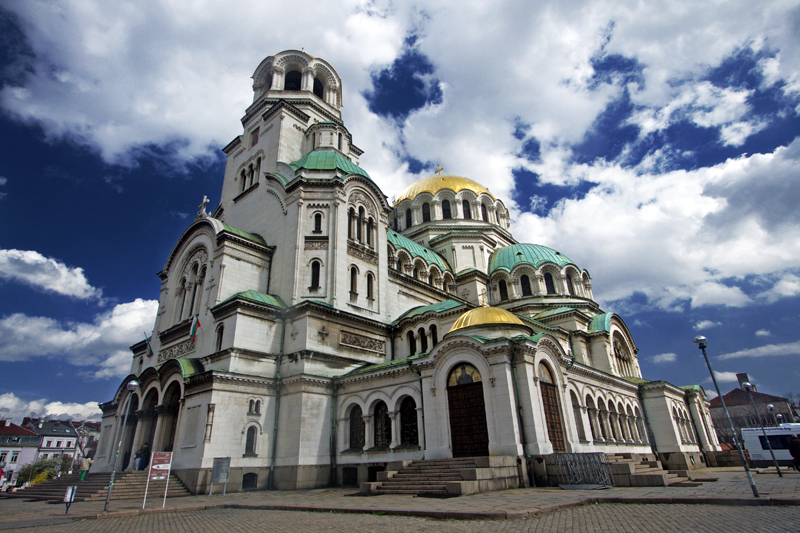
Sofia

== Qualification ==
Qualified Failed to qualify / Withdrew Suspended

The qualification process was a series of tournaments organised by the five FIVB confederations to decide 21 of the 24 teams which would play in the final tournament, with Italy and Bulgaria qualifying automatically as hosts and Poland also qualifying automatically as the defending champions. All remaining FIVB member associations were eligible to enter the qualifying process.

At first, 150 associations registered teams to compete in the qualification process, but 19 associations withdrew from the qualifying process after they registered and India were suspended and then expelled from taking part in the process as a punishment for internal problems in the India Volleyball Federation.

The five regional governing bodies were allocated the remaining 21 spots; CAVB (Africa) was granted three, AVC (Asia and Oceania) four, NORCECA (North America) five, CSV (South America) two, and CEV (Europe) seven spots.

Of the 24 nations qualified to play at the 2018 World Championship, 20 countries competed at the previous tournament in 2014. Slovenia qualified for the first time. Other teams returning after absences of the last tournament(s) include: Dominican Republic, returning to the finals after their only previous appearance in 1974, Netherlands, who last competed in 2002, and Japan, who missed the 2014 edition.

Notable countries that failed to qualify include the 2014 third placed Germany, Venezuela (for the first time since 1998), South Korea and Czech Republic.

=== Qualified teams ===
Country	Confederation	Qualified as	Qualified on	Previous appearances			Previous best performance
Country	Confederation	Qualified as	Qualified on	Total	First	Last	Previous best performance
Italy	CEV	Host country	9 December 2015	16	1949	2014	Champions (1990, 1994, 1998)
Bulgaria	CEV	Host country	9 December 2015	17	1949	2014	Runners-up (1970)
Poland	CEV	Defending champions	21 September 2014	16	1949	2014	Champions (1974, 2014)
Serbia^{1}	CEV	CEV Second Round Pool E winners	27 May 2017	9	1956	2014	Runners-up (1998)
Netherlands	CEV	CEV Second Round Pool B winners	28 May 2017	11	1949	2002	Runners-up (1994)
Slovenia	CEV	CEV Second Round Pool C winners	28 May 2017	0	None		None
Finland	CEV	CEV Second Round Pool F winners	28 May 2017	7	1952	2014	9th place (2014)
Russia^{2}	CEV	CEV Second Round Pool D winners	28 May 2017	18	1949	2014	Champions (1949, 1952, 1960, 1962, 1978, 1982)
France	CEV	CEV Second Round Pool A winners	28 May 2017	15	1949	2014	3rd place (2002)
Japan	AVC	AVC Final Round Pool B winners	15 July 2017	14	1960	2010	3rd place (1970, 1974)
Australia	AVC	AVC Final Round Pool B runners-up	16 July 2017	6	1982	2014	15th place (2014)
Belgium	CEV	CEV Third Round Pool G winners	23 July 2017	8	1949	2014	8th place (1970)
Brazil	CSV	2017 South American champions	11 August 2017	16	1956	2014	Champions (2002, 2006, 2010)
China	AVC	AVC Final Round Pool A runners-up	13 August 2017	13	1956	2014	7th place (1978, 1982)
Iran	AVC	AVC Final Round Pool A winners	13 August 2017	5	1970	2014	6th place (2014)
Argentina	CSV	CSV Qualifier winners	2 September 2017	11	1960	2014	3rd place (1982)
Dominican Republic	NORCECA	2017 NORCECA runners-up	30 September 2017	1	1974		22nd place (1974)
United States	NORCECA	2017 NORCECA champions	30 September 2017	15	1956	2014	Champions (1986)
Canada	NORCECA	2017 NORCECA 3rd place	1 October 2017	10	1974	2014	7th place (2014)
Tunisia	CAVB	2017 African champions	27 October 2017	9	1962	2014	15th place (2006)
Egypt	CAVB	2017 African runners-up	27 October 2017	8	1974	2014	13th place (2010)
Cameroon	CAVB	2017 African 3rd place	29 October 2017	3	1990	2014	13th place (2010)
Puerto Rico	NORCECA	NORCECA Final Four winners	12 November 2017	4	1974	2014	12th place (2006)
Cuba	NORCECA	NORCECA Final Four runners-up	12 November 2017	14	1956	2014	Runners-up (1990, 2010)

Notes
^{1} Competed as SFR Yugoslavia from 1956 to 1990 and as Serbia and Montenegro (FR Yugoslavia) from 1994 to 2006; 3rd appearance as Serbia.
^{2} Competed as Soviet Union from 1949 to 1990; 7th appearance as Russia.

== Format ==
First round

In the first round, the 24 teams were spread across four pools of six teams playing in a single round-robin format. The top four teams in each pool qualified for the second round, featuring four pools of four teams playing in four cities.

Second round

The second round featured four pools of four teams playing once again in a single round-robin format. At the end of the second round matches, the rankings of the four pools were drawn up taking into account the points scored by each team in the first and second rounds. The four pool-winning teams of the second round qualified for the third round, together with the top two of the second placed teams.

Third round

The six teams competing in the third round were divided into two three-team pools by a draw. After the matches played once again in a single round-robin format, the top two teams in each pool qualified for the semifinals and finals.

Final round

The third round pool winners played against the runners-up in this round. The semifinals winners advanced to compete for the World Championship title. The losers faced each other in the 3rd place match.

== Pools composition ==
=== First round ===
Teams were seeded in the first two positions of each pool following the serpentine system according to their FIVB World Ranking as of 7 July 2017. FIVB reserved the right to seed the hosts as head of pools A and D regardless of the World Ranking. All teams not seeded were drawn to take other available positions in the remaining lines, following the World Ranking. Each pool had no more than three teams from the same confederation. The draw was held in Florence, Italy on 30 November 2017. Rankings are shown in brackets except the hosts Italy and Bulgaria who ranked 4th and 14th respectively.

Seeded teams
Pool A	Pool B	Pool C	Pool D
Italy (Hosts); Argentina (7)	Brazil (1); Canada (6)	United States (2); Russia (4)	Bulgaria (Hosts); Poland (3)
Unseeded teams
Pot 1	Pot 2	Pot 3	Pot 4
Iran (8); France (9); Serbia (11); Japan (12)	Egypt (13); Belgium (15); Cuba (16); Australia (16)	Finland (18); China (20); Slovenia (23); Tunisia (24)	Netherlands (25); Puerto Rico (29); Cameroon (30); Dominican Republic (38)

Draw

Pool A	Pool B	Pool C	Pool D
Italy	Brazil	United States	Bulgaria
Argentina	Canada	Russia	Poland
Japan	France	Serbia	Iran
Belgium	Egypt	Australia	Cuba
Slovenia	China	Tunisia	Finland
Dominican Republic	Netherlands	Cameroon	Puerto Rico

=== Second round ===
Pool E		Pool F		Pool G		Pool H	
1A	Italy	1B	Brazil	1C	United States	1D	Poland
2B	Netherlands	2A	Belgium	2D	Iran	2C	Serbia
3C	Russia	3A	Slovenia	3D	Bulgaria	3B	France
4D	Finland	4C	Australia	4B	Canada	4A	Argentina

=== Third round ===
The third round draw was held in Turin, Italy on 24 September 2018. The 1st ranked teams of pools E and F were drawn in pools I and J consecutively and the 1st ranked teams of pools G and H were also drawn in pools I and J consecutively. The 1st best second team among the four pools was placed in pool I, while the 2nd best second team among the four pools was placed in pool J.

Pool I		Pool J	
1F	Brazil	1E	Italy
1G	United States	1H	Poland
1B2SR	Russia	2B2SR	Serbia

== Venues ==
Pool A (only 9 September)	Pool A (excl. 9 September)	Pool B	Pool C
Rome, Italy	Florence, Italy	Ruse, Bulgaria	Bari, Italy
Foro Italico Tennis Center Court	Nelson Mandela Forum	Arena Ruse	PalaFlorio
Capacity: 11,000	Capacity: 7,500	Capacity: 5,100	Capacity: 5,080
Pool D and H	2018 FIVB Men's Volleyball World Championship (Italy)		2018 FIVB Men's Volleyball World Championship (Bulgaria)
Varna, Bulgaria	2018 FIVB Men's Volleyball World Championship (Italy)		2018 FIVB Men's Volleyball World Championship (Bulgaria)
Palace of Culture and Sports	2018 FIVB Men's Volleyball World Championship (Italy)		2018 FIVB Men's Volleyball World Championship (Bulgaria)
Capacity: 6,000	2018 FIVB Men's Volleyball World Championship (Italy)		2018 FIVB Men's Volleyball World Championship (Bulgaria)
Pool E	Pool F	Pool G	Third and Final round
Assago, Italy	Bologna, Italy	Sofia, Bulgaria	Turin, Italy
Mediolanum Forum	Land Rover Arena	Armeets Arena	Pala Alpitour
Capacity: 12,677	Capacity: 5,721	Capacity: 12,500	Capacity: 15,807

== Pool standing procedure ==
1. Total number of victories (matches won, matches lost)
2. In the event of a tie, the following first tiebreaker will apply: The teams will be ranked by the most points gained per match as follows:
  - Match won 3–0 or 3–1: 3 points for the winner, 0 points for the loser
  - Match won 3–2: 2 points for the winner, 1 point for the loser
  - Match forfeited: 3 points for the winner, 0 points (0–25, 0–25, 0–25) for the loser
3. If teams are still tied after examining the number of victories and points gained, then the FIVB will examine the results in order to break the tie in the following order:
  - Sets quotient: if two or more teams are tied on the number of points gained, they will be ranked by the quotient resulting from the division of the number of all sets won by the number of all sets lost.
  - Points quotient: if the tie persists based on the sets quotient, the teams will be ranked by the quotient resulting from the division of all points scored by the total of points lost during all sets.
  - If the tie persists based on the points quotient, the tie will be broken based on the team that won the match of the Round Robin Phase between the tied teams. When the tie in points quotient is between three or more teams, these teams ranked taking into consideration only the matches involving the teams in question.

== Opening matches ==
The opening matches of the 2018 World Championship, jointly hosted by Italy and Bulgaria held With the presence of the president Sergio Mattarella and Rumen Radev. President of Italy Mattarella was guest of honour as co-hosts Italy got their 2018 campaign off to the perfect start with a 3–0 victory over Japan. Alongside FIVB President Ary Graça, Italian National Olympic Committee President Giovanni Malago, President of the Italian Volleyball Federation Pietro Bruno Cattaneo and many more national and international dignitaries, President Mattarella joined the 11,170-strong partisan crowd at Foro Italico Tennis Center Court, Rome and in Varna, the home side Bulgaria fared just as successfully as their co-hosts, sweeping aside Finland 3–0 to take a commanding lead in Pool D, were present President of Bulgaria Radev was joined by his Minister for Sport, Krasen Kralev, at Palace of Culture and Sports.

== First round ==
- The top four teams in each pool qualified for the second round.

=== Pool A ===
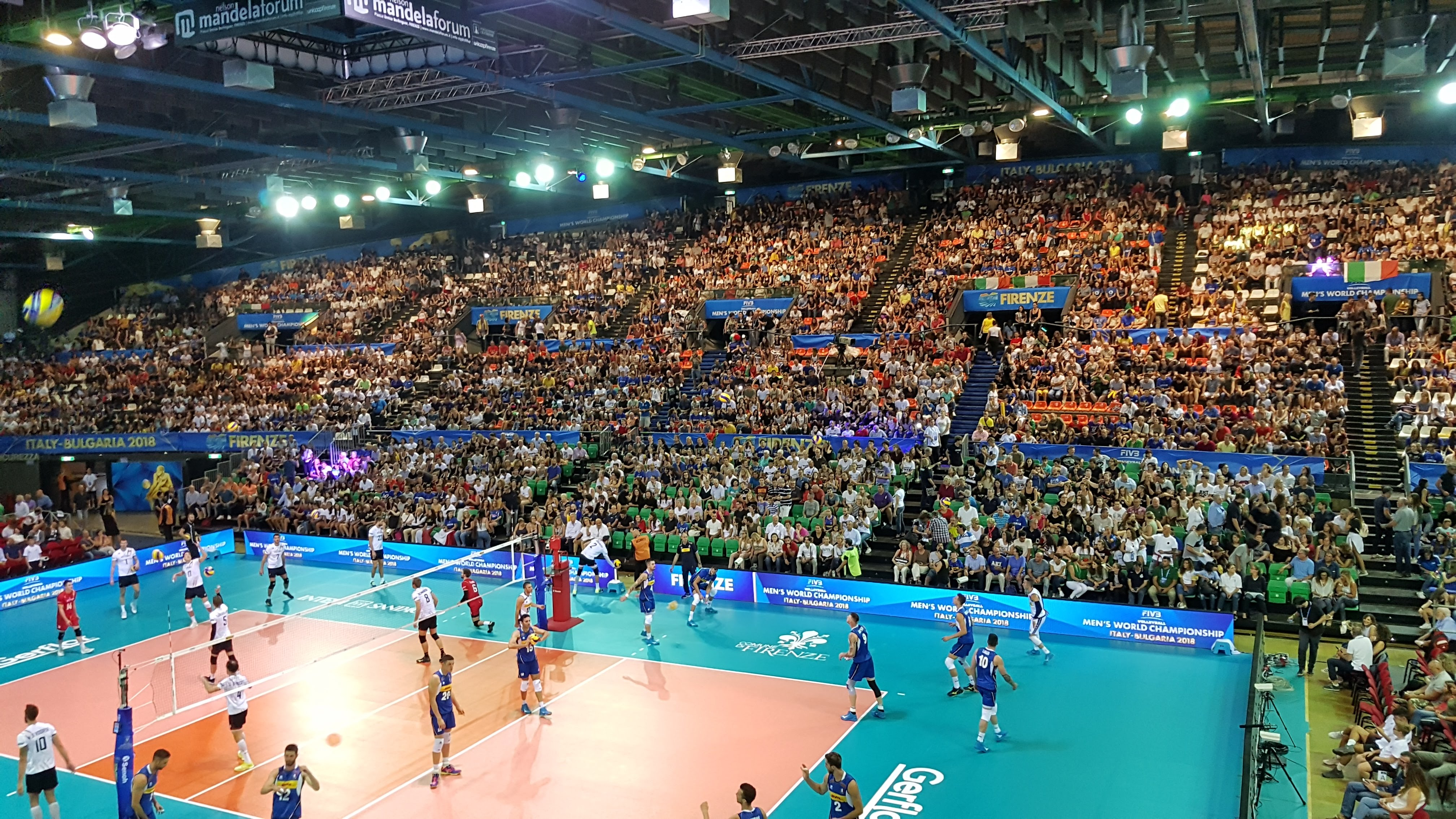
Belgium vs. Italy.

- All times are Central European Summer Time (UTC+02:00).

Pos	Team	Pld	W	L	Pts	SW	SL	SR	SPW	SPL	SPR	Qualification
1	Italy	5	5	0	15	15	2	7.500	423	326	1.298	Second round
2	Belgium	5	3	2	10	11	8	1.375	419	394	1.063	Second round
3	Slovenia	5	3	2	9	12	10	1.200	479	463	1.035	Second round
4	Argentina	5	2	3	6	10	11	0.909	475	469	1.013	Second round
5	Japan	5	2	3	5	8	11	0.727	414	427	0.970	
6	Dominican Republic	5	0	5	0	1	15	0.067	267	398	0.671	

Date	Time		Score		Set 1	Set 2	Set 3	Set 4	Set 5	Total	Report
9 Sep	19:30	Italy	3–0	Japan	25–20	25–21	25–23			75–64	P2
12 Sep	17:00	Dominican Republic	1–3	Slovenia	25–22	13–25	13–25	17–25		68–97	P2
12 Sep	20:30	Belgium	3–1	Argentina	25–19	25–19	22–25	25–19		97–82	P2
13 Sep	17:00	Dominican Republic	0–3	Japan	20–25	16–25	16–25			52–75	P2
13 Sep	21:15	Italy	3–0	Belgium	25–20	25–17	25–16			75–53	P2
14 Sep	17:00	Japan	1–3	Slovenia	20–25	25–22	20–25	13–25		78–97	P2
14 Sep	20:30	Argentina	3–0	Dominican Republic	26–24	25–15	25–15			76–54	P2
15 Sep	17:00	Belgium	2–3	Slovenia	25–22	25–21	19–25	23–25	13–15	105–108	P2
15 Sep	21:15	Italy	3–1	Argentina	22–25	25–15	25–23	28–26		100–89	P2
16 Sep	17:00	Japan	1–3	Belgium	25–14	23–25	14–25	19–25		81–89	P2
16 Sep	21:15	Dominican Republic	0–3	Italy	12–25	18–25	15–25			45–75	P2
17 Sep	17:00	Belgium	3–0	Dominican Republic	25–18	25–13	25–17			75–48	P2
17 Sep	20:30	Argentina	3–2	Slovenia	25–18	22–25	27–29	25–17	15–13	114–102	P2
18 Sep	17:00	Japan	3–2	Argentina	26–24	20–25	30–32	25–20	15–13	116–114	P2
18 Sep	21:15	Italy	3–1	Slovenia	23–25	25–19	25–13	25–18		98–75	P2

=== Pool B ===
- All times are Eastern European Summer Time (UTC+03:00).

Pos	Team	Pld	W	L	Pts	SW	SL	SR	SPW	SPL	SPR	Qualification
1	Brazil	5	4	1	11	13	6	2.167	439	405	1.084	Second round
2	Netherlands	5	4	1	11	12	8	1.500	455	420	1.083	Second round
3	France	5	3	2	11	13	7	1.857	456	420	1.086	Second round
4	Canada	5	3	2	9	11	7	1.571	426	408	1.044	Second round
5	Egypt	5	1	4	3	4	13	0.308	368	426	0.864	
6	China	5	0	5	0	3	15	0.200	375	440	0.852	

Date	Time		Score		Set 1	Set 2	Set 3	Set 4	Set 5	Total	Report
12 Sep	14:00	France	3–0	China	25–20	25–21	25–17			75–58	P2
12 Sep	17:00	Netherlands	0–3	Canada	15–25	23–25	18–25			56–75	P2
12 Sep	20:30	Brazil	3–0	Egypt	25–17	25–22	25–20			75–59	P2
13 Sep	17:00	Egypt	0–3	Canada	25–27	28–30	19–25			72–82	P2
13 Sep	20:30	Brazil	3–2	France	25–20	25–20	21–25	23–25	15–12	109–102	P2
14 Sep	17:00	China	1–3	Netherlands	21–25	13–25	25–23	13–25		72–98	P2
14 Sep	20:30	France	3–0	Egypt	25–22	25–23	25–16			75–61	P2
15 Sep	17:00	Canada	3–1	China	25–22	25–19	21–25	25–23		96–89	P2
15 Sep	20:30	Netherlands	3–1	Brazil	21–25	25–20	25–20	25–21		96–86	P2
16 Sep	17:00	China	1–3	Egypt	26–28	24–26	25–17	21–25		96–96	P2
16 Sep	20:30	Netherlands	3–2	France	23–25	19–25	25–21	25–23	15–13	107–107	P2
17 Sep	17:00	Egypt	1–3	Netherlands	18–25	21–25	25–23	16–25		80–98	P2
17 Sep	20:30	Brazil	3–1	Canada	25–22	19–25	25–23	25–18		94–88	P2
18 Sep	17:00	China	0–3	Brazil	21–25	22–25	17–25			60–75	P2
18 Sep	20:30	Canada	1–3	France	22–25	21–25	25–22	17–25		85–97	P2

=== Pool C ===
- All times are Central European Summer Time (UTC+02:00).

Pos	Team	Pld	W	L	Pts	SW	SL	SR	SPW	SPL	SPR	Qualification
1	United States	5	5	0	13	15	5	3.000	456	383	1.191	Second round
2	Serbia	5	4	1	12	14	7	2.000	476	430	1.107	Second round
3	Russia	5	3	2	10	12	6	2.000	422	366	1.153	Second round
4	Australia	5	2	3	7	9	11	0.818	428	442	0.968	Second round
5	Cameroon	5	1	4	3	4	12	0.333	334	398	0.839	
6	Tunisia	5	0	5	0	2	15	0.133	317	414	0.766	

Date	Time		Score		Set 1	Set 2	Set 3	Set 4	Set 5	Total	Report
12 Sep	14:00	Cameroon	3–0	Tunisia	25–20	28–26	25–21			78–67	P2
12 Sep	17:00	Australia	0–3	Russia	21–25	20–25	16–25			57–75	P2
12 Sep	20:30	United States	3–2	Serbia	15–25	25–14	21–25	25–20	15–10	101–94	P2
13 Sep	17:00	Australia	2–3	United States	23–25	20–25	25–22	25–23	10–15	103–110	P2
13 Sep	20:30	Cameroon	0–3	Serbia	28–30	16–25	17–25			61–80	P2
14 Sep	17:00	Australia	3–1	Cameroon	21–25	25–17	25–22	25–20		96–84	P2
14 Sep	20:30	Russia	3–0	Tunisia	25–19	25–6	25–19			75–44	P2
15 Sep	17:00	Serbia	3–1	Tunisia	20–25	25–20	25–21	25–20		95–86	P2
15 Sep	20:30	United States	3–1	Russia	25–23	20–25	25–23	25–20		95–91	P2
16 Sep	17:00	Cameroon	0–3	United States	18–25	20–25	14–25			52–75	P2
16 Sep	20:30	Serbia	3–1	Australia	25–20	21–25	25–17	25–19		96–81	P2
17 Sep	17:00	Russia	3–0	Cameroon	25–16	30–28	25–15			80–59	P2
17 Sep	20:30	Australia	3–1	Tunisia	16–25	25–17	25–19	25–16		91–77	P2
18 Sep	17:00	United States	3–0	Tunisia	25–12	25–18	25–13			75–43	P2
18 Sep	20:30	Serbia	3–2	Russia	25–21	24–26	25–17	22–25	15–12	111–101	P2

=== Pool D ===
- All times are Eastern European Summer Time (UTC+03:00).

Pos	Team	Pld	W	L	Pts	SW	SL	SR	SPW	SPL	SPR	Qualification
1	Poland	5	5	0	15	15	3	5.000	445	343	1.297	Second round
2	Iran	5	4	1	11	12	7	1.714	437	400	1.093	Second round
3	Bulgaria	5	3	2	9	11	6	1.833	395	368	1.073	Second round
4	Finland	5	2	3	6	9	12	0.750	453	471	0.962	Second round
5	Cuba	5	1	4	3	6	13	0.462	392	436	0.899	
6	Puerto Rico	5	0	5	1	3	15	0.200	331	435	0.761	

Date	Time		Score		Set 1	Set 2	Set 3	Set 4	Set 5	Total	Report
9 Sep	20:40	Bulgaria	3–0	Finland	25–21	25–19	25–22			75–62	P2
12 Sep	17:00	Iran	3–0	Puerto Rico	25–19	25–14	25–18			75–51	P2
12 Sep	20:30	Cuba	1–3	Poland	18–25	19–25	25–21	14–25		76–96	P2
13 Sep	17:00	Puerto Rico	0–3	Poland	14–25	12–25	15–25			41–75	P2
13 Sep	20:40	Iran	3–1	Bulgaria	25–22	25–20	22–25	25–19		97–86	P2
14 Sep	17:00	Finland	3–1	Cuba	25–19	25–19	20–25	25–16		95–79	P2
14 Sep	20:40	Bulgaria	3–0	Puerto Rico	25–16	25–18	25–21			75–55	P2
15 Sep	17:00	Cuba	1–3	Iran	25–17	18–25	22–25	19–25		84–92	P2
15 Sep	20:30	Poland	3–1	Finland	25–20	26–28	25–16	25–15		101–79	P2
16 Sep	17:00	Puerto Rico	2–3	Finland	19–25	23–25	29–27	25–21	10–15	106–113	P2
16 Sep	20:40	Cuba	0–3	Bulgaria	22–25	16–25	18–25			56–75	P2
17 Sep	17:00	Cuba	3–1	Puerto Rico	25–15	22–25	25–21	25–17		97–78	P2
17 Sep	20:30	Iran	0–3	Poland	21–25	20–25	22–25			63–75	P2
18 Sep	17:00	Finland	2–3	Iran	19–25	25–22	25–23	23–25	12–15	104–110	P2
18 Sep	20:40	Bulgaria	1–3	Poland	14–25	25–23	22–25	23–25		84–98	P2

== Second round ==
- The standings of the four pools were drawn up taking into account the wins and points scored by each team in the first and second round.
- The winners in each pool and the top two of the second placed teams qualified for the third round.

=== Pool E ===
- All times are Central European Summer Time (UTC+02:00).

Pos	Team	Pld	W	L	Pts	SW	SL	SR	SPW	SPL	SPR	Qualification
1	Italy	8	7	1	22	23	6	3.833	691	568	1.217	Third round
2	Russia	8	6	2	18	21	8	2.625	675	578	1.168	Third round
3	Netherlands	8	5	3	14	16	15	1.067	692	661	1.047	
4	Finland	8	2	6	6	10	21	0.476	638	719	0.887	

Date	Time		Score		Set 1	Set 2	Set 3	Set 4	Set 5	Total	Report
21 Sep	17:00	Netherlands	0–3	Russia	17–25	16–25	21–25			54–75	P2
21 Sep	21:15	Italy	3–0	Finland	25–20	25–18	25–16			75–54	P2
22 Sep	17:00	Netherlands	3–1	Finland	25–19	23–25	25–16	25–13		98–73	P2
22 Sep	21:15	Russia	3–2	Italy	19–25	25–18	25–21	19–25	15–11	103–100	P2
23 Sep	17:00	Russia	3–0	Finland	25–17	25–19	25–22			75–58	P2
23 Sep	21:15	Italy	3–1	Netherlands	16–25	25–20	27–25	25–15		93–85	P2

=== Pool F ===
- All times are Central European Summer Time (UTC+02:00).

Pos	Team	Pld	W	L	Pts	SW	SL	SR	SPW	SPL	SPR	Qualification
1	Brazil	8	7	1	19	22	8	2.750	699	618	1.131	Third round
2	Belgium	8	4	4	14	16	14	1.143	667	657	1.015	
3	Slovenia	8	4	4	13	17	16	1.063	722	716	1.008	
4	Australia	8	3	5	9	12	19	0.632	665	701	0.949	

Date	Time		Score		Set 1	Set 2	Set 3	Set 4	Set 5	Total	Report
21 Sep	17:00	Brazil	3–0	Australia	25–21	25–22	25–15			75–58	P2
21 Sep	20:30	Belgium	0–3	Slovenia	26–28	26–28	19–25			71–81	P2
22 Sep	17:00	Australia	0–3	Belgium	26–28	26–28	20–25			72–81	P2
22 Sep	20:30	Slovenia	0–3	Brazil	22–25	21–25	16–25			59–75	P2
23 Sep	17:00	Slovenia	2–3	Australia	25–23	20–25	25–19	22–25	11–15	103–107	P2
23 Sep	20:30	Belgium	2–3	Brazil	25–22	25–23	19–25	15–25	12–15	96–110	P2

=== Pool G ===
- All times are Eastern European Summer Time (UTC+03:00).

Pos	Team	Pld	W	L	Pts	SW	SL	SR	SPW	SPL	SPR	Qualification
1	United States	8	8	0	22	24	6	4.000	704	585	1.203	Third round
2	Canada	8	5	3	13	18	14	1.286	712	694	1.026	
3	Bulgaria	8	4	4	13	16	12	1.333	625	617	1.013	
4	Iran	8	4	4	12	14	16	0.875	674	664	1.015	

Date	Time		Score		Set 1	Set 2	Set 3	Set 4	Set 5	Total	Report
21 Sep	17:00	United States	3–1	Canada	25–17	25–14	21–25	25–17		96–73	P2
21 Sep	20:40	Bulgaria	3–0	Iran	25–19	28–26	26–24			79–69	P2
22 Sep	17:00	Iran	2–3	Canada	20–25	25–20	15–25	25–23	12–15	97–108	P2
22 Sep	20:40	Bulgaria	0–3	United States	20–25	20–25	18–25			58–75	P2
23 Sep	17:00	United States	3–0	Iran	25–23	26–24	26–24			77–71	P2
23 Sep	20:40	Bulgaria	2–3	Canada	19–25	14–25	25–21	25–19	10–15	93–105	P2

=== Pool H ===
- All times are Eastern European Summer Time (UTC+03:00).

Pos	Team	Pld	W	L	Pts	SW	SL	SR	SPW	SPL	SPR	Qualification
1	Poland	8	6	2	19	21	9	2.333	702	593	1.184	Third round
2	Serbia	8	6	2	17	20	12	1.667	707	677	1.044	Third round
3	France	8	5	3	18	21	12	1.750	765	688	1.112	
4	Argentina	8	3	5	8	14	19	0.737	725	751	0.965	

Date	Time		Score		Set 1	Set 2	Set 3	Set 4	Set 5	Total	Report
21 Sep	17:00	Serbia	3–2	France	22–25	26–24	25–20	18–25	18–16	109–110	P2
21 Sep	20:40	Poland	2–3	Argentina	25–16	19–25	23–25	25–23	14–16	106–105	P2
22 Sep	17:00	Serbia	3–0	Argentina	25–18	25–22	25–22			75–62	P2
22 Sep	20:40	Poland	1–3	France	15–25	18–25	25–23	18–25		76–98	P2
23 Sep	17:00	France	3–1	Argentina	25–16	25–20	26–28	25–19		101–83	P2
23 Sep	20:40	Poland	3–0	Serbia	25–17	25–16	25–14			75–47	P2

=== Ranking of the second placed teams ===
- The top two of the second placed teams qualified for the third round.

Pos	Team	Pld	W	L	Pts	SW	SL	SR	SPW	SPL	SPR	Qualification
1	Russia	8	6	2	18	21	8	2.625	675	578	1.168	Third round
2	Serbia	8	6	2	17	20	12	1.667	707	677	1.044	Third round
3	Canada	8	5	3	13	18	14	1.286	712	694	1.026	
4	Belgium	8	4	4	14	16	14	1.143	667	657	1.015	

== Third round ==
- All times are Central European Summer Time (UTC+02:00).
- The top two teams in each pool qualified for the semifinals.

=== Pool I ===
Pos	Team	Pld	W	L	Pts	SW	SL	SR	SPW	SPL	SPR	Qualification
1	Brazil	2	2	0	5	6	2	3.000	181	164	1.104	Semifinals
2	United States	2	1	1	3	3	3	1.000	132	143	0.923	Semifinals
3	Russia	2	0	2	1	2	6	0.333	175	181	0.967	

Date	Time		Score		Set 1	Set 2	Set 3	Set 4	Set 5	Total	Report
26 Sep	17:00	Brazil	3–2	Russia	20–25	21–25	25–22	25–23	15–12	106–107	P2
27 Sep	17:00	United States	3–0	Russia	25–22	25–23	25–23			75–68	P2
28 Sep	17:00	Brazil	3–0	United States	25–20	25–18	25–19			75–57	P2

=== Pool J ===
Pos	Team	Pld	W	L	Pts	SW	SL	SR	SPW	SPL	SPR	Qualification
1	Poland	2	1	1	4	5	3	1.667	180	171	1.053	Semifinals
2	Serbia	2	1	1	3	3	3	1.000	149	134	1.112	Semifinals
3	Italy	2	1	1	2	3	5	0.600	150	174	0.862	

Date	Time		Score		Set 1	Set 2	Set 3	Set 4	Set 5	Total	Report
26 Sep	21:15	Italy	0–3	Serbia	15–25	20–25	18–25			53–75	P2
27 Sep	20:30	Poland	3–0	Serbia	28–26	28–26	25–22			81–74	P2
28 Sep	21:15	Italy	3–2	Poland	14–25	25–21	18–25	25–17	15–11	97–99	P2

== Final round ==
- All times are Central European Summer Time (UTC+02:00).

Semifinals
29 September
Brazil	3
Serbia	0
29 September
Poland	3
United States	2

Final
30 September
Brazil	0
Poland	3
3rd place match
30 September
Serbia	1
United States	3

=== Semifinals ===
Date	Time		Score		Set 1	Set 2	Set 3	Set 4	Set 5	Total	Report
29 Sep	17:00	Brazil	3–0	Serbia	25–22	25–21	25–22			75–65	P2
29 Sep	21:15	Poland	3–2	United States	25–22	20–25	23–25	25–20	15–11	108–103	P2

=== 3rd place match ===
Date	Time		Score		Set 1	Set 2	Set 3	Set 4	Set 5	Total	Report
30 Sep	17:00	Serbia	1–3	United States	25–23	17–25	30–32	19–25		91–105	P2

=== Final ===
Date	Time		Score		Set 1	Set 2	Set 3	Set 4	Set 5	Total	Report
30 Sep	21:15	Brazil	0–3	Poland	26–28	20–25	23–25			69–78	P2

== Final standing ==
Rank	Team
1st place, gold medalist(s)	Poland
2nd place, silver medalist(s)	Brazil
3rd place, bronze medalist(s)	United States
4	Serbia
5	Italy
6	Russia
7	France
8	Netherlands
9	Canada
10	Belgium
11	Bulgaria
12	Slovenia
13	Iran
14	Australia
15	Argentina
16	Finland
17	Japan
18	Cuba
19	Cameroon
20	Egypt
21	Puerto Rico
22	China
23	Tunisia
24	Dominican Republic

Qualified for the 2019 World Cup

2018 World Champions

Poland
Third title

Team roster: Piotr Nowakowski, Dawid Konarski, Bartosz Kurek, Artur Szalpuk, Damian Schulz, Damian Wojtaszek, Fabian Drzyzga, Grzegorz Łomacz, Michał Kubiak (c), Aleksander Śliwka, Jakub Kochanowski, Paweł Zatorski, Bartosz Kwolek, Mateusz Bieniek
Head coach: Vital Heynen

== Awards ==
- Most valuable player
  (Poland) Bartosz Kurek
- Best setter
  (United States) Micah Christenson
- Best outside spikers
  (Poland) Michał Kubiak
  (Brazil) Douglas Souza
- Best middle blockers
  (Brazil) Lucas Saatkamp
  (Poland) Piotr Nowakowski
- Best opposite spiker
  (United States) Matt Anderson
- Best libero
  (Poland) Paweł Zatorski

== Statistics leaders ==
The statistics of each group follows the vis reports P2 and P3. The statistics include 6 volleyball skills; serve, reception, set, spike, block, and dig. The table below shows the top 5 ranked players in each skill plus top scorers at the completion of the tournament. Only players whose teams advanced to the final round are taken in consideration.

Best Scorers
	Player	Spikes	Blocks	Serves	Total
1	(Poland) Bartosz Kurek	133	22	16	171
2	(United States) Matt Anderson	138	9	16	163
3	(Brazil) Wallace de Souza	145	6	6	157
4	(United States) Aaron Russell	135	10	8	153
5	(Brazil) Douglas Souza	129	10	11	150

Best Spikers
	Player	Spikes	Faults	Shots	Total	%
1	(Brazil) Douglas Souza	129	28	71	228	56.58
2	(United States) Matthew Anderson	138	47	59	244	56.56
3	(United States) Taylor Sander	107	34	49	190	56.32
4	(Serbia) Uroš Kovačević	104	31	59	194	53.61
5	(Brazil) Wallace de Souza	145	43	83	271	53.51

Best Blockers
	Player	Blocks	Faults	Rebounds	Total	Avg
1	(Poland) Bartosz Kurek	22	16	22	60	0.48
2	(Poland) Michał Kubiak	21	17	15	53	0.46
3	(Poland) Piotr Nowakowski	19	15	46	80	0.41
4	(Serbia) Srećko Lisinac	18	37	39	94	0.40
5	(United States) Maxwell Holt	17	37	42	96	0.38

Best Servers
	Player	Aces	Faults	Hits	Total	Avg
1	(Serbia) Marko Ivović	16	33	90	139	0.36
2	(United States) Matt Anderson	16	37	99	152	0.36
3	(Poland) Bartosz Kurek	16	35	59	110	0.35
4	(United States) Taylor Sander	15	41	90	146	0.33
5	(United States) Maxwell Holt	15	28	63	106	0.33

Best Setters
	Player	Running	Faults	Still	Total	Avg
1	(United States) Micah Christenson	293	8	473	774	6.51
2	(Serbia) Nikola Jovović	239	4	563	806	5.31
3	(Brazil) Bruno Rezende	190	2	422	614	4.32
4	(Brazil) William Arjona	156	1	189	246	1.27
5	(Poland) Fabian Drzyzga	52	3	588	643	1.12

Best Diggers
	Player	Digs	Faults	Receptions	Total	Avg
1	(United States) Erik Shoji	74	5	33	112	1.64
2	(Poland) Paweł Zatorski	69	10	42	121	1.50
3	(Brazil) Thales Hoss	60	7	26	93	1.36
4	(United States) Micah Christenson	48	5	25	78	1.07
5	(Brazil) Bruno Rezende	46	7	22	75	1.05

Best Receivers
	Player	Excellents	Faults	Serve	Total	%
1	(United States) Taylor Sander	82	10	115	207	34.78
2	(Poland) Paweł Zatorski	81	11	127	219	31.96
3	(Brazil) Douglas Souza	96	19	167	292	27.30
4	(Serbia) Marko Ivović	78	18	146	242	24.79
5	(Poland) Michał Kubiak	73	18	133	224	24.55

== Marketing ==
=== Sponsors ===
Italy

- Intesa Sanpaolo
- Honda
- Arriva
- Kinder
- Fastweb
- Atlantia S.p.A.
- Trenitalia
- Iren
- Crai

Bulgaria

- Lidl
- First Investment Bank
- Volkswagen
- Holiday Heroes
- Novatrade Ltd
- Bulgariatravel

== Trophy ==
Comparable to 2014, the FIVB then mandated two young product designers from Switzerland, Thilo Alex Brunner and Jörg Mettler, to create the new World Championship trophy. With its contemporary design, the trophy has set itself apart from other awards in international competitions across the sporting world. Eichenberger LTD and their mastermind, Juan Franco, have been responsible for its production. The company specialises in complex metal works, mainly for the Swiss watchmaking and jewellery industry. The trophy was constructed using 12 individual pieces, representing each member of a volleyball team. The pieces are brought together in a cylindrical design, symbolising the coming together of the 12 players using the rotation system on the court.

== Broadcasting rights ==
FIVB, through several companies, sold the broadcasting rights for the 2018 World Championship to the following broadcasters.

Country/Region	Broadcaster
Argentina	TV Pública
Belarus	Saran Holding
Belgium	VRT
Bosnia and Herzegovina	Sport Klub
Brazil	Grupo Globo
Bulgaria	BNT
China	CCTV, Tencent
Costa Rica	Sky México
Croatia	Sport Klub
Dominica	Sky México
Dominican Republic	Sky México
Egypt	Nile Sport, OnTime Sports
Europe	Eurosport
Finland	YLE
Germany	Sky Sport
Guatemala	Sky México
Honduras	Sky México
Hong Kong	i-CABLE Sports
Iran	IRIB Varzesh
Israel	Charlton
Italy	RAI
Japan	TBS
Kazakhstan	Saran Holding
South Korea	SPOTV
Libya	Libya Sport Channel
Macedonia	Sport Klub
Malaysia	Astro
MENA	ASBU
Mexico	Sky México
Montenegro	Sport Klub
Morocco	SNRT
Netherlands	Ziggo Sport
Nicaragua	Sky México
Oman	Oman Sport
Panama	Sky México
Poland	Polsat, TVP
Puerto Rico	WAPA-TV
Russia	Match TV
Serbia	Sport Klub
Slovenia	Sport Klub
Thailand	Workpoint TV
Trinidad and Tobago	Sky México
United Arab Emirates	Abu Dhabi Sports, Dubai Sports
United States	FloSports

== See also ==
- 2018 FIVB Women's Volleyball World Championship
