= 2017 Men's South American Volleyball Championship =

2017 Men's South American Championship
Tournament details
- Host country: Chile
- Dates: 7–11 August
- Teams: 8 (from 1 confederation)
- Venue: 2 (in 2 host cities)

Final positions
- Champions: Brazil (31st title)
- Runners-up: Venezuela
- Third place: Argentina
- Fourth place: Chile

Tournament awards
- MVP: (Brazil) Maurício Borges Silva
- Best Setter: (Brazil) Bruno Rezende
- Best OH: (Brazil) Ricardo Lucarelli (Chile) Vicente Parraguirre
- Best MB: (Venezuela) José Verdi (Argentina) Sebastián Solé
- Best OPP: (Brazil) Wallace de Souza
- Best Libero: (Venezuela) Héctor Mata

The 2017 Men's South American Volleyball Championship was the 32nd edition of the Men's South American Volleyball Championship, organised by South America's governing volleyball body, the Confederación Sudamericana de Voleibol (CSV). The tournament was held in Santiago and Temuco, Chile from 7 to 11 August 2017. The champions qualified for the 2018 FIVB Volleyball Men's World Championship.

== Pools composition ==
Pool A	Pool B
Brazil	Chile (Hosts)
Colombia	Argentina
Venezuela	Uruguay
Paraguay	Peru

== Venues ==
- Centro Nacional de Entrenamiento Olímpico, Santiago, Chile – Pool B and Final four
- Gimnasio Olímpico Regional UFRO, Temuco, Chile – Pool A and 5th–8th places

== Pool standing procedure ==
1. Number of matches won
2. Match points
3. Sets ratio
4. Points ratio
5. If the tie continues as per the point ratio between two teams, the priority will be given to the team which won the last match between them. When the tie in points ratio is between three or more teams, a new classification of these teams in the terms of points 1, 2 and 3 will be made taking into consideration only the matches in which they were opposed to each other.

Match won 3–0 or 3–1: 3 match points for the winner, 0 match points for the loser
Match won 3–2: 2 match points for the winner, 1 match point for the loser

== Preliminary round ==
- All times are Chile Standard Time (UTC−04:00).

=== Pool A ===
Pos	Team	Pld	W	L	Pts	SW	SL	SR	SPW	SPL	SPR	Qualification
1	Brazil	3	3	0	9	9	0	MAX	225	114	1.974	Semifinals
2	Venezuela	3	2	1	6	6	4	1.500	213	204	1.044	Semifinals
3	Colombia	3	1	2	3	4	6	0.667	210	224	0.938	5th–8th semifinals
4	Paraguay	3	0	3	0	0	9	0.000	119	225	0.529	5th–8th semifinals

Date	Time		Score		Set 1	Set 2	Set 3	Set 4	Set 5	Total	Report
7 Aug	19:00	Colombia	1–3	Venezuela	22–25	18–25	25–22	24–26		89–98	Result
7 Aug	21:00	Brazil	3–0	Paraguay	25–4	25–14	25–10			75–28	Result
8 Aug	19:00	Colombia	3–0	Paraguay	25–18	25–16	25–17			75–51	Result
8 Aug	21:00	Venezuela	0–3	Brazil	10–25	16–25	14–25			40–75	Result
9 Aug	12:00	Venezuela	3–0	Paraguay	25–17	25–9	25–14			75–40	Result
9 Aug	14:00	Brazil	3–0	Colombia	25–14	25–11	25–21			75–46	Result

=== Pool B ===
Pos	Team	Pld	W	L	Pts	SW	SL	SR	SPW	SPL	SPR	Qualification
1	Argentina	3	3	0	9	9	1	9.000	246	183	1.344	Semifinals
2	Chile	3	2	1	6	7	3	2.333	230	199	1.156	Semifinals
3	Uruguay	3	1	2	2	3	8	0.375	216	260	0.831	5th–8th semifinals
4	Peru	3	0	3	1	2	9	0.222	212	262	0.809	5th–8th semifinals

Date	Time		Score		Set 1	Set 2	Set 3	Set 4	Set 5	Total	Report
7 Aug	18:30	Argentina	3–0	Uruguay	25–16	25–18	25–20			75–54	Result
7 Aug	20:30	Chile	3–0	Peru	25–19	25–12	25–22			75–53	Result
8 Aug	18:30	Argentina	3–0	Peru	25–15	25–22	25–12			75–49	Result
8 Aug	20:30	Chile	3–0	Uruguay	25–19	25–12	25–19			75–50	Result
9 Aug	18:30	Uruguay	3–2	Peru	22–25	27–25	28–26	20–25	15–9	112–110	Result
9 Aug	20:30	Chile	1–3	Argentina	18–25	25–21	15–25	22–25		80–96	Result

== Final round ==
- All times are Chile Standard Time (UTC−04:00).

=== 5th–8th places ===
5th–8th semifinals
10 August
Uruguay	3
Paraguay	0
10 August
Peru	0
Colombia	3

5th place match
11 August
Uruguay	1
Colombia	3
7th place match
11 August
Paraguay	1
Peru	3

==== 5th–8th semifinals ====
Date	Time		Score		Set 1	Set 2	Set 3	Set 4	Set 5	Total	Report
10 Aug	19:00	Uruguay	3–0	Paraguay	25–16	25–17	25–20			75–53	Result
10 Aug	21:00	Peru	0–3	Colombia	19–25	19–25	16–25			54–75	Result

==== 7th place match ====
Date	Time		Score		Set 1	Set 2	Set 3	Set 4	Set 5	Total	Report
11 Aug	19:00	Paraguay	1–3	Peru	25–23	17–25	18–25	21–25		81–98	Result

==== 5th place match ====
Date	Time		Score		Set 1	Set 2	Set 3	Set 4	Set 5	Total	Report
11 Aug	21:00	Uruguay	1–3	Colombia	25–23	20–25	20–25	19–25		84–98	Result

=== Final four ===
Semifinals
10 August
Argentina	2
Venezuela	3
10 August
Brazil	3
Chile	0

Final
11 August
Venezuela	0
Brazil	3
3rd place match
11 August
Argentina	3
Chile	0

==== Semifinals ====
Date	Time		Score		Set 1	Set 2	Set 3	Set 4	Set 5	Total	Report
10 Aug	18:30	Brazil	3–0	Chile	25–20	25–12	25–14			75–46	Result
10 Aug	20:30	Argentina	2–3	Venezuela	24–26	25–15	26–24	24–26	13–15	112–106	Result

==== 3rd place match ====
Date	Time		Score		Set 1	Set 2	Set 3	Set 4	Set 5	Total	Report
11 Aug	18:30	Argentina	3–0	Chile	25–18	25–22	25–21			75–61	Result

==== Final ====
Date	Time		Score		Set 1	Set 2	Set 3	Set 4	Set 5	Total	Report
11 Aug	20:30	Venezuela	0–3	Brazil	21–25	6–25	18–25			45–75	Result

== Final standing ==
Rank	Team
1st place, gold medalist(s)	Brazil
2nd place, silver medalist(s)	Venezuela
3rd place, bronze medalist(s)	Argentina
4	Chile
5	Colombia
6	Uruguay
7	Peru
8	Paraguay

Qualified for the 2018 World Championship
Qualified for the 2018 World Championship CSV Qualification tournament
Already qualified as hosts for the 2018 World Championship CSV Qualification tournament

2017 Men's South American champions

Brazil
31st title

14–man roster
Bruno (c), Isac, T. Brendle, Wallace, Raphael, Otávio, Rodriguinho, M. Souza, Douglas, Lucas, Thales, Lucarelli, Maurício, Renan Buiatti
Head coach
Renan Dal Zotto

== Awards ==
- Most valuable player
  (Brazil) Maurício Borges Silva
- Best setter
  (Brazil) Bruno Rezende
- Best outside spikers
  (Brazil) Ricardo Lucarelli
  (Chile) Vicente Parraguirre
- Best middle blockers
  (Venezuela) José Verdi
  (Argentina) Sebastián Solé
- Best opposite spiker
  (Brazil) Wallace de Souza
- Best libero
  (Venezuela) Héctor Mata

== See also ==
- South American Women's Volleyball Championship
- Men's U23 South American Volleyball Championship
- Men's Junior South American Volleyball Championship
- Boys' Youth South American Volleyball Championship
- Boys' U17 South American Volleyball Championship
- Volleyball at the Pan American Games
- Men's Pan-American Volleyball Cup
- Women's Pan-American Volleyball Cup
