= Sjödin =

Sjödin (pronounced [ɧœˈdiːn]) is a Swedish surname. Notable people with the surname include:

- Agneta Sjödin (born 1967), Swedish TV host
- Anna Sjödin (born 1976), Swedish politician
- Dru Sjodin (1981–2003), American murder victim
- Jenny Sjödin (born Anna Jenny Thunell) (born 1985), Swedish wrestler
- Jimmy Sjödin (born 1977), Swedish Olympic diver
- Karin Sjödin (born 1983), Swedish golfer
- Simon Sjödin (born 1986), Swedish Olympic swimmer
- Tommy Sjödin (born 1965), retired Swedish ice hockey player

== See also ==
- Sjölin
- Anne Schedeen, family name of her ancestors was Sjödin prior to Anglicization
