= 2018 FIVB Men's Volleyball World Championship qualification (CSV) =

The CSV qualification for the 2018 FIVB Men's Volleyball World Championship saw member nations compete for two places at the finals in Italy and Bulgaria. The 2017 Men's South American champions, plus one team from the qualification tournament qualified for the 2018 World Championship.

== Pool standing procedure ==
1. Number of matches won
2. Match points
3. Sets ratio
4. Points ratio
5. If the tie continues as per the point ratio between two teams, the priority will be given to the team which won the last match between them. When the tie in points ratio is between three or more teams, a new classification of these teams in the terms of points 1, 2 and 3 will be made taking into consideration only the matches in which they were opposed to each other.

Match won 3–0 or 3–1: 3 match points for the winner, 0 match points for the loser
Match won 3–2: 2 match points for the winner, 1 match point for the loser

== 2017 South American Championship ==
- Venues: Centro Nacional de Entrenamiento Olímpico, Santiago, Chile and Gimnasio Olímpico Regional UFRO, Temuco, Chile
- Dates: 7–11 August 2017
- The champions qualified for the 2018 World Championship, whereas the second and third ranked teams except the qualification tournament hosts Argentina qualified for the qualification tournament.

Rank	Team
1st place, gold medalist(s)	Brazil
2nd place, silver medalist(s)	Venezuela
3rd place, bronze medalist(s)	Argentina
4	Chile
5	Colombia
6	Uruguay
7	Peru
8	Paraguay

Qualified for the 2018 World Championship
Qualified for the 2018 World Championship CSV Qualification tournament
Already qualified as hosts for the 2018 World Championship CSV Qualification tournament

== Qualification tournament ==
- Venues: Estadio Nestor Kirchner, Palpalá, Argentina (30 August) and Polideportivo Delmi, Salta, Argentina (1–2 September)
- Dates: 30 August – 2 September 2017
- All times are Argentina Time (UTC−03:00).
- The winners qualified for the 2018 World Championship.

Pos	Team	Pld	W	L	Pts	SW	SL	SR	SPW	SPL	SPR	Qualification
1	Argentina	2	2	0	6	6	1	6.000	171	121	1.413	2018 World Championship
2	Chile	2	1	1	3	4	3	1.333	149	153	0.974	
3	Venezuela	2	0	2	0	0	6	0.000	104	150	0.693	

Date	Time		Score		Set 1	Set 2	Set 3	Set 4	Set 5	Total	Report
30 Aug	21:15	Argentina	3–1	Chile	21–25	25–19	25–17	25–13		96–74	Result
1 Sep	21:00	Chile	3–0	Venezuela	25–22	25–20	25–15			75–57	Result
2 Sep	17:00	Argentina	3–0	Venezuela	25–19	25–16	25–12			75–47	Result
