= Anne Schedeen =

American actress (1949–2026)

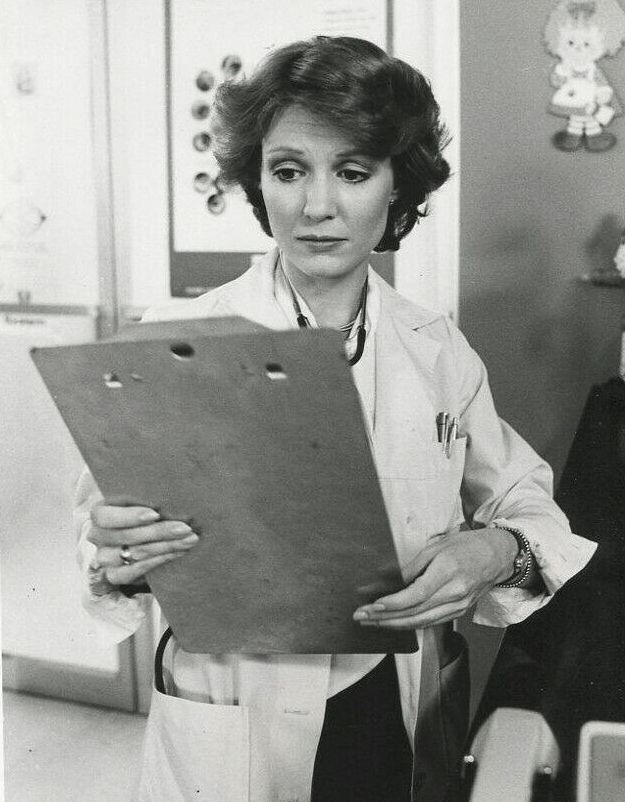
- Schedeen in 1979
- Born: Luanne Ruth Schedeen; January 8, 1949; Portland, Oregon, U.S.
- Died: June 14, 2026 (aged 77)
- Occupation: Actress
- Years active: 1974–2014
- Spouse: Christopher Barrett (m. 1982)
- Children: 1

Luanne Ruth Schedeen (January 8, 1949 – June 14, 2026), known professionally as Anne Schedeen, was an American actress, who worked primarily in television. She appeared in numerous guest-starring television roles in the 1970s before portraying the lead role of Kate Tanner on the series ALF from 1986 until 1990.

Schedeen began her career in 1974, appearing in small television roles, and was cast in a supporting part in the sci-fi horror film Embryo (1976). She subsequently had recurring roles on Emergency! and Three's Company in the mid-to-late 1970s. In 1984, she was cast on the short-lived series Paper Dolls opposite Lloyd Bridges and Lauren Hutton. She appeared as Emily Phillips in the second season of the sitcom Cheers, before appearing in all four seasons of ALF. She later appeared in a recurring role on the series Judging Amy in 2001.

== Early life ==
Luanne Ruth Schedeen was born January 8, 1949, in Portland, Oregon. Her mother, Betty Jane (née Moore) was also a native of Portland. Her father was Roland E. 'Poly' Schedeen, a farmer and former Oregon State Senator of Swedish descent. Her family name, prior to its Anglicization, was Sjödin. Schedeen has two younger siblings: a sister, Sarabeth, and brother Tony; as well as one elder half-brother, Brinkley (1946–2009), from her mother's first marriage.

Schedeen described herself as an introverted child: "I was so introverted as a little girl I would hide under the skirts of the dining room table and just listen to the adults." Due to her extreme shyness, Schedeen's mother enrolled her in youth drama classes to help her become "more comfortable with the world." Schedeen studied and performed with the Portland Civic Theatre. Schedeen grew up on a farm outside Gresham, Oregon, and attended Gresham High School, graduating in 1967. After high school, Schedeen studied at Portland State University, and later, Fort Wright College in Toppenish, Washington. Her first professional acting job was performing with a dinner theater on the Kauai island of Hawaii. She subsequently relocated to New York City to pursue an acting career.

== Career ==
=== Early roles ===
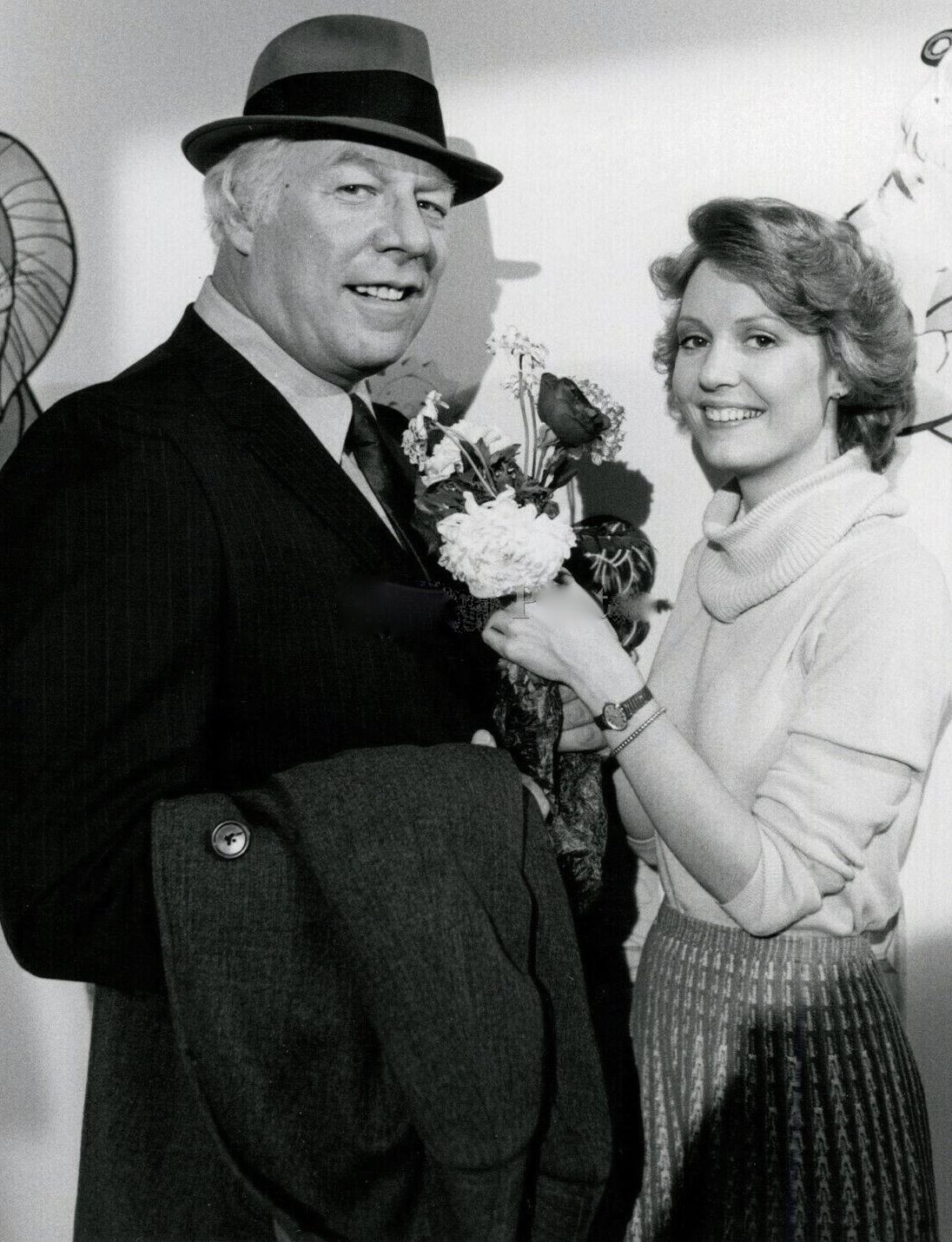
Schedeen and George Kennedy in Never Say Never (1979)

In New York, Schedeen first worked in summer stock theatre and commercials before signing an acting contract with Universal Pictures, after which she moved to Los Angeles. From 1974 to 1976, Schedeen appeared in a recurring role as Carol on the NBC TV series Emergency!, and guest-starred as Doctor Marcus Welby's daughter, Sandy Porter, in 12 episodes of the medical drama Marcus Welby, M.D.. In 1976, she was cast in a supporting part in the sci-fi horror film Embryo, co-starring with Rock Hudson and Diane Ladd, in which she played the daughter-in-law of a doctor (Hudson) who uses growth hormones to begin growing humans.

In 1979, she had a supporting role in the television drama Champions: A Love Story, and from 1977 to 1982 guest-starred on several episodes of the comedy series Three's Company. Schedeen also had a supporting role on the short-lived series Paper Dolls (1984), co-starring with Lauren Hutton and Morgan Fairchild. She portrayed Emily Phillips in a second season episode of the sitcom Cheers, and appeared in episodes of the dramas Simon & Simon, Magnum, P.I. and Murder, She Wrote.

=== ALF and later work ===
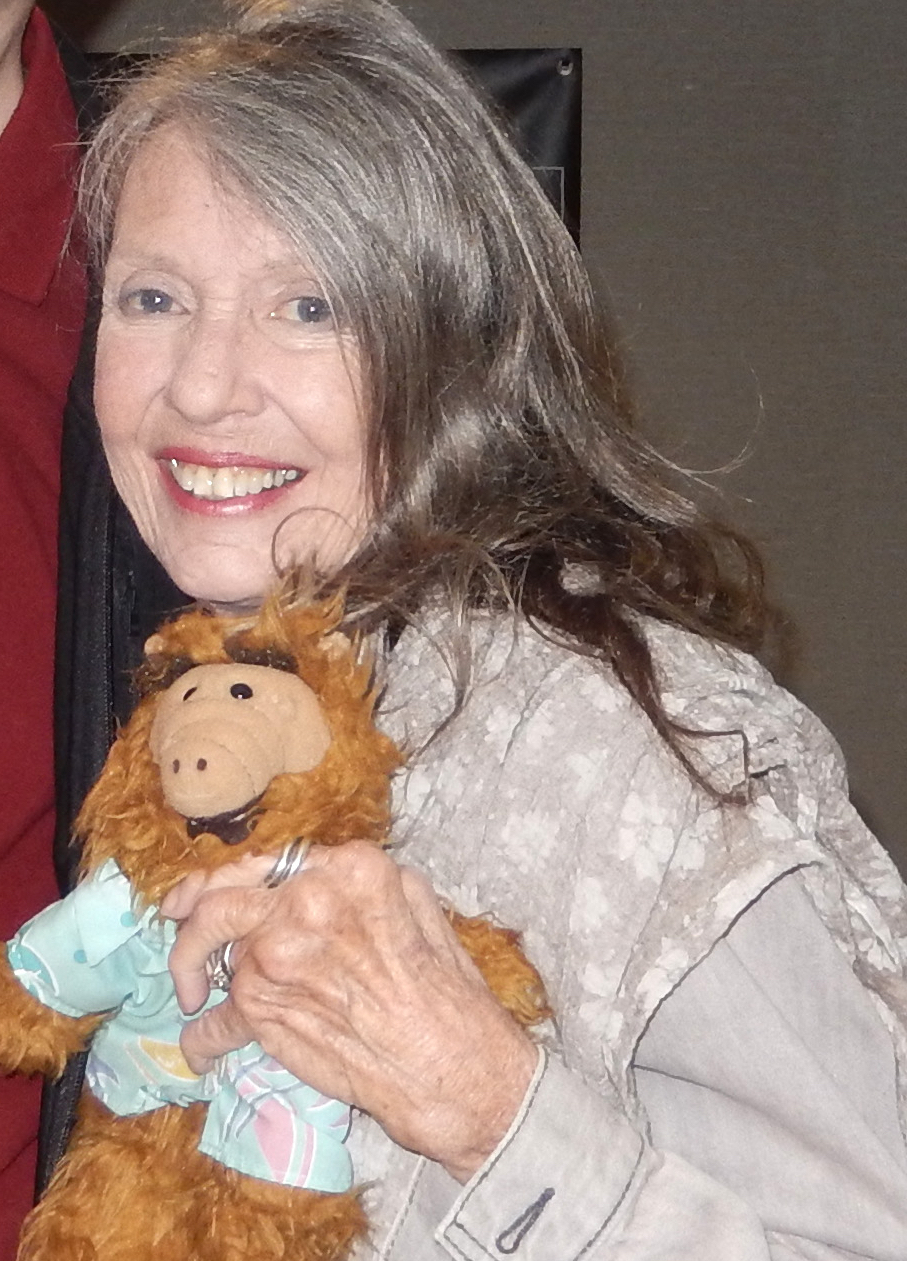
Schedeen with an ALF toy in 2019

Schedeen is best known for her role as Kate Tanner on the NBC sitcom ALF, which ran from 1986 to 1990, and in which she portrayed a mother who takes an alien into her home. ALF was a commercial success, and brought Schedeen international attention. After the series' conclusion, she appeared in Perry Mason: The Case of the Maligned Mobster (1991), followed by supporting roles in the television film Praying Mantis (1996) and the thriller Heaven's Prisoners (1996), starring Alec Baldwin and Kelly Lynch.

In 2001, Schedeen had a recurring guest-starring role on the legal drama series Judging Amy.

== Personal life and death ==
Schedeen met her husband, talent agent Christopher Barrett, in 1972 when they appeared together in a stage play. The two married in 1982 on the tenth anniversary of their first date. The couple have a daughter.

In 2015, Schedeen became an ambassador for Holiday Heroes, a Bulgarian non-profit organization assisting disadvantaged families.

Schedeen died on June 14, 2026, at the age of 77.

== Filmography ==
=== Film ===
Year	Title	Role	Notes	Ref.
1974	Aloha Means Goodbye	Stewardess	Television film	
1975	You Lie So Deep, My Love	Ellen	Television film	
1976	Embryo	Helen Holliston		
1977	Flight to Holocaust	Linda Michaels	Television film	
1977	Exo-Man	Emily Frost	Television film	
1978	Almost Heaven	Margie	Television film	
1979	Champions: A Love Story	Diane Kachatorian	Television film	
1979	Never Say Never	Dr. Sarah Keaton	Television film	
1982	Little Darlings	Camp Counselor	Television film	
1983	Second Thoughts	Janis		
1985	Braker	Lieutenant Polly Peters	Television film	
1986	Slow Burn	Mona	Television film	
1989	Cast the First Stone	Elaine Stanton	Television film	
1991	Perry Mason: The Case of the Maligned Mobster	Paula Barrett	Television film	
1993	Praying Mantis	Karen		
1996	Heaven's Prisoners	Jungle Room Patron		

=== Television ===
Year	Title	Role	Notes	Ref.
1974	Get Christie Love!	Gloria	Episode: "Market for Murder"	
1974	Ironside	Vicki	Episode: "Speak No Evil"	
1974	Lucas Tanner	Flight Attendant Carolyn	Episode: "Merry Gentlemen"	
1974	The Six Million Dollar Man	Tina Larson	Episode: "Burning Bright"	
1975	McCloud	Tina	Episode: "Park Avenue Pirates"	
1975	Three for the Road		Episode: "Trail of the Bigfoot"	
1974–1976	Emergency!	Carol	6 episodes	
1974–1976	Marcus Welby, M.D.	Sandy Porter	12 episodes	
1976	The Bionic Woman	Milly Wilson	Episode: "The Jailing of Jaime"	
1975–1978	Switch	Keelie Blair	2 episodes	
1977	Family	Susie	2 episodes	
1977	Kingston: Confidential	Melanie	Episode: "Seed of Corruption"	
1977	Lanigan's Rabbi	Barbara James	Episode: "The Cadaver in the Clutter"	
1978	Baretta	Linda	Episode: "Why Me?"	
1978	Project U.F.O.	Helen McNair	Episode: "Sighting 4001: The Washington D.C. Incident"	
1978–1982	Three's Company	Linda / Louise Prescott / Lisa Page	5 episodes	
1979	The Incredible Hulk	Kimberly Dowd	Episode: "My Favorite Magician"	
1979	Friends	Alice Price	2 episodes	
1980	Semi-Tough	Amanda	Episode: "One Bad Apple"	
1984	Cheers	Emily Phillips	Episode: "Norman's Conquest"	
1984	E/R	Karen Sheridan	Episode: "The Sister"	
1984	Paper Dolls	Sara Frank	13 episodes	
1982–1985	Simon & Simon	Bailey Randall	2 episodes	
1986	If Tomorrow Comes	Charlotte	Miniseries	
1986	Magnum, P.I.	Audrey Gilbert	Episode: "I Never Wanted to Go to France, Anyway"	
1986	Murder, She Wrote	Julia Granger	Episode: "If the Frame Fits"	
1986–1990	ALF	Kate Tanner	102 episodes	
2001	Judging Amy	Det. Peggy Fraser	3 episodes	
2014	Tiny Nuts	Anne	Episode: "BFF"	
