= 20,000 Eyes =

1961 crime drama film directed by Jack Leewood

- Theatrical release poster
- Directed by: Jack Leewood
- Screenplay by: Jack W. Thomas
- Produced by: Jack Leewood
- Starring: Gene Nelson; Merry Anders; James Brown; John Banner; Judith Rawlins; Robert Shayne
- Cinematography: Brydon Baker
- Edited by: Peter C. Johnson
- Music by: Albert Glasser
- Production company: Associated Producers, Inc.
- Distributed by: 20th Century Fox
- Release date: June 14, 1961
- Running time: 61 minutes
- Country: United States
- Language: English

20,000 Eyes is a 1961 American drama film directed by Jack Leewood, written by Jack W. Thomas, and starring Gene Nelson, Merry Anders, James Brown, John Banner, Judith Rawlins and Robert Shayne.

The film was released on June 14, 1961, by 20th Century Fox.

== Plot ==
Dan Warren, an investment broker in urgent need of money for a diamond-mining venture, embezzles $100,000 from his client, Kurt Novak. Novak, who is involved in criminal activity himself, discovers the theft and gives Warren five days to repay the money, threatening to arrange his death if he fails. Rather than return the money, Warren devises a plan to recover his losses through another scheme. His efforts draw in Karen Walker and Jerry Manning and place him under increasing pressure from both Novak and the police. As Warren attempts to evade the consequences of the embezzlement, the situation becomes increasingly dangerous and his plans begin to unravel.

== Cast ==
- Gene Nelson as Dan Warren
- Merry Anders as Karen Walker
- James Brown as Jerry Manning
- John Banner as Kurt Novak
- Judith Rawlins as Girl
- Robert Shayne as Police Lieutenant
- Paul Maxey as Ryan
- Rex Holman as High School Boy
- Ollie O'Toole as Moore
- Barbara Parkins as High School Girl
- Bruno VeSota as Museum Watchman
- Rusty Wescoatt as Policeman

== Production ==
The film was announced in January, 1961, and Daniel Ceccaldi was originally sought for the lead role. Filming began in March, 1961 with Gene Nelson instead.
