= Embryo (film) =

1976 film by Ralph Nelson

- Theatrical release poster
- Directed by: Ralph Nelson
- Written by: Anita Doohan; Jack W. Thomas
- Produced by: Anita Doohan; Arnold H. Orgolini
- Starring: Rock Hudson; Diane Ladd; Roddy McDowall; Barbara Carrera
- Cinematography: Fred J. Koenekamp
- Edited by: John A. Martinelli
- Music by: Gil Melle
- Production companies: Plura Service Company; Sandy Howard Productions
- Distributed by: Cine Artists Pictures
- Release date: May 21, 1976 (United States)
- Running time: 104 minutes
- Country: United States
- Language: English
- Budget: $1,400,000

Embryo is a 1976 American science fiction horror film directed by Ralph Nelson starring Rock Hudson, Barbara Carrera, and Diane Ladd with a cameo appearance by Roddy McDowall. It deals with the mental and physical consequences of growing a human embryo in an artificial uterus.

== Plot ==
Dr. Paul Holliston is a geneticist who has been living alone in his rambling clinic, which he operates out of his home, after losing his wife in a car crash. This leads to his feeling constant pangs of guilt from his sister-in-law Martha Douglas, who has become his assistant.

One night, Holliston runs over a pregnant Doberman Pinscher. The dog is fatally injured, but Holliston manages to save one of her unborn puppies by gestating it in an artificial uterus. Because the device still requires nutrients to be supplied by the mother, he must drastically shorten the gestation period: to this end, he uses an experimental growth hormone made from human placental lactogen, which speeds up the embryo's growth. The dog grows to adult size in a few days, and Holliston passes it off as the mother to disguise his secret experiments. Thanks to the serum, it learns incredibly fast and soon becomes a well-trained dog. However, Holliston fails to notice that the animal's aggression and intelligence are increasing commensurately: while he is out on an errand, it kills an annoying small dog and conceals the carcass.

Eager to use his discovery for the good of mankind, Holliston applies the same technique to an unborn human extracted from a suicide victim. However, the subject's cells age uncontrollably, so Holliston uses the drug methotrexate to counter the effect. It works, and the embryo grows into an 22 year-old woman he names Victoria Spencer.

Holliston educates Victoria, and she soon gathers photographic encyclopedic knowledge of science, literature and culture. He begins introducing her to his friends and coworkers as a University of Colorado graduate, and she wows them with a riveting game of chess against chess champion Riley, infuriating him when she deliberately lets him win the final move at Holliston's subtle urging. Holliston completes Victoria's education by engaging in sex with her at her encouragement.

Soon afterwards, Victoria discovers the rapid aging of her cells has resumed and becomes addicted to the methotrexate to stave off her deterioration. Thanks to a chance meeting with the manager of Teletex International computer systems at a party, Victoria is able to access the most advanced computer system in the state, which informs her that she can counter the aging with pituitary gland extract from a 5 to 6 month old human fetus. In addition, Martha has grown jealous of Victoria's success, and finds out the University of Colorado has never heard of her. Before she leaves for Minneapolis, Victoria decides to poison Martha with methotrexate in order to keep her origin secret. Shortly after Martha's departure, Holliston is informed of her fatal heart attack.

Holliston leaves to meet with Martha's coroner. Meanwhile, Victoria destroys all of Holliston's research records and tapes concerning his experiments. Victoria murders a prostitute to get her unborn child. However, the records indicated the child was already dead in the womb and unviable for her needs. When the autopsy reveals that Martha's death may have been a homicide, Holliston hurries home and alerts his son Gordon to meet him there to go after Victoria. He finds Victoria, now middle-aged, having surgically removed his daughter-in-law Helen's baby. When he attempts to capture her she stabs and kills Gordon, sending the gestating tank containing the baby crashing to the floor.

Now determined to kill Victoria, Holliston gets in a car chase after her. When a now-elderly Victoria crashes her car, Holliston pulls her out to finish her off, but paramedics intervene and discover the geriatric victim is in labor. As she is being carried away, she reveals that she is pregnant with his baby, causing Holliston to cry out for her death in despair. As the scene fades to black, the cry of a newborn child is heard.

== Cast ==
- Rock Hudson as Dr. Paul Holliston
- Barbara Carrera as Victoria Spencer
- Diane Ladd as Martha Douglas
- Roddy McDowall as Frank Riley
- Anne Schedeen as Helen Holliston
- John Elerick as Gordon Holliston
- Vincent Baggetta as Collier
- Jack Colvin as Dr. Jim Winston
- Dr. Joyce Brothers as herself
- Dick Winslow as John Forbes
- Ken Washington as Dr. Brink
- Lina Raymond as Janet Novak
- Sherri Zak as a nurse

== See also ==
- List of films in the public domain in the United States
