= Jack W. Thomas =

American novelist

Jack William Thomas (born October 24, 1930, in Seattle, Washington) is an American screenwriter and pulp magazine author.

== Biography ==
Thomas enlisted in the United States Navy for four years in 1950 during the period of the Korean War. He entered the University of Arizona on the G.I. Bill earning a Bachelor of Arts in 1957. The following year Thomas traveled through Europe and Mexico.

Thomas became a screenwriter working for Robert L. Lippert's 20th Century Fox B picture unit Regal Films later Associate Producers Incorporated where he wrote the films Lone Texan (1959), 13 Fighting Men (1960) and 20,000 Eyes (1961). His experience led him to co-write the screenplay for Michael Curtiz's Francis of Assisi (1961) for Fox. In 1962 Thomas produced and wrote the documentary We'll Bury You that was released by Columbia Pictures. He used his profits to travel to Egypt in 1964 where he wrote a script for an unmade documentary, Nine Bows to Conquer.

Seeking secure and rewarding work, Thomas became a Los Angeles County deputy probation officer for six years. His experiences led him to write a series of 11 novels for Bantam Books about troubled youth that were translated into five languages and sold over 1.5 million copies.

Thomas returned to screenwriting for Embryo (1976).

== Bibliography ==
- Turn Me On 1969
- Reds 1970
- The Bikers 1972
- Girls Farm 1974
- The Fear Dealers 1975
- Heavy Number 1976
- High School Pusher 1977
- Burn Out 1979
- Doing It 1981
- Head On! 1983
- Randy 1984
- Shakespeare's Hundred Best One-Liners (1999)

== Personal life ==
Thomas married Cathleen "Casey" Cagney, the daughter of James Cagney in 1962. Thomas assisted Cagney in his autobiography Cagney By Cagney. Jack and Cathleen had two children and divorced in 1981.
