= Paper Dolls =

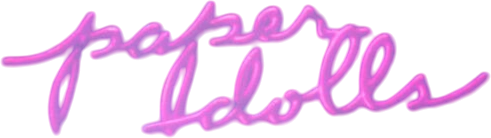
- Genre: Soap opera
- Created by: Jennifer Miller; Leah Markus
- Written by: Stephen Black; Jill Gordon; Jennifer Miller; Don Roos; Henry Stern
- Directed by: Edward Parone; Leo Penn; Arthur Allan Seidelman; Ralph Senensky
- Starring: Lloyd Bridges; Jennifer Warren; Brenda Vaccaro; Dack Rambo; Mimi Rogers; Richard Beymer; Anne Schedeen; John Bennett Perry; Nancy Olson; Nicollette Sheridan; Terry Farrell; Lauren Hutton; Morgan Fairchild
- Theme music composer: Mark Snow; Andy Summers
- Composer: Mark Snow
- Country of origin: United States
- Original language: English
- No. of seasons: 1
- No. of episodes: 14 (+ 1 TV film)

Production
- Executive producer: Leonard Goldberg
- Producer: John Ziffren
- Cinematography: John C. Flinn III
- Editor: Jack Harnish
- Production companies: Mandy Films; MGM Television

Original release
- Network: ABC
- Release: September 23 – December 25, 1984

Paper Dolls is an American primetime television soap opera that aired for 14 episodes on ABC from September 23 to December 25, 1984. Set in New York's fashion industry, the show centered on top modeling agency owner Racine (Morgan Fairchild), her conflicts with the family of cosmetics tycoon Grant Harper (Lloyd Bridges), and the careers of two teenaged models (Terry Farrell and Nicollette Sheridan). The series was based on a 1982 television film of the same name. The show suffered in the ratings, despite positive reviews, and was cancelled midway through the first season.

== Overview ==
=== 1982 television film ===
Paper Dolls first aired on May 24, 1982 as an ABC Monday Night Movie, which revolved around the lives of two teenage models, Taryn and Laurie, and their strong-willed mothers. The cast included Joan Hackett as Julia Blake, Jennifer Warren as Dinah Caswell, Daryl Hannah as Julia's daughter Taryn, Marc Singer as Wesley Myles, Antonio Fargas as photographer Oliver, Barry Primus as Alan (credited as "also starring"), Alexandra Paul as Dinah's daughter Laurie (in her first role, credited as "introducing") and Craig T. Nelson as husband Michael. Joan Collins appeared as Racine, the conniving owner of Taryn and Laurie's modelling agency, credited in the opening as a "special guest star". Eric Stoltz, William Brian Curran, Jeffrey Richman and Lillibet Stern appeared in co-starring roles. The film was directed by Edward Zwick and written by Casey T. Mitchell and Leah Markus, with a theme song written by Mark Snow and performed by Brock Walsh. It garnered 20.5 million viewers.

=== 1984 television series ===
Clockwise from top: Terry Farrell, Morgan Fairchild, and Nicollette Sheridan

In 1984, MGM decided to produce a weekly series based on the original film. Jennifer Warren and Jeffrey Richman (in the minor role of Conrad) were the only actors to reprise their roles, with Hackett (who died unexpectedly before production), Hannah, Paul, Nelson and Collins replaced by Brenda Vaccaro, Nicollette Sheridan, Terry Farrell, John Bennett Perry and Morgan Fairchild respectively.

New characters included Grant Harper (Lloyd Bridges), the manipulative chairman of the conglomerate Harper World Wide, who was frequently at odds with Racine (Fairchild); his second wife Marjorie (Nancy Olson); his son Wesley (Dack Rambo), chief executive of Harper Cosmetics, who allied with Racine against his father, blaming him for the accidental death of his mother, Virginia, Grant's first wife; his daughter, Blair Harper Fenton (Mimi Rogers), Racine's top model; and Blair's husband David Fenton (Richard Beymer), head of Tempus Sportswear, a business rival to Grant.

During the series, Blair is 30 years old, pregnant and fearing the end of her modelling career. Despite health problems, she was determined to carry her baby to full term. David is too proud to accept financial assistance, and resorts to accepting money from loan sharks to fund his upcoming collection, putting him and Blair in danger. Eventually, he is forced to ask his father in-law for help, resulting in Tempus being brought under the Harper World Wide banner, paying off the loan in full, and also the interest.

Meanwhile, Racine struggles to manage Taryn Blake (Sheridan), the top teen model in the business, who has problems with drugs and alcohol, and a sensationalized romance with 1980s pop star John Waite (playing himself in a recurring role). To keep Taryn and her demanding mother Julia (Vaccaro) in line, Racine decides to promote a new fresh teen face, a young woman named Laurie Caswell (Farrell). The naive and innocent Laurie still attends public school in Stonehurst in Long Island and is not prepared for the fast life, despite her mother Dinah Anderson Caswell's (Warren) best efforts to keep her grounded. Dinah, a former model herself, focuses too much time on her daughter's career, putting a strain on her marriage to Michael Caswell (Perry), Laurie's stepfather.

Despite their vast differences, Taryn and Laurie become good friends, while the rivalry between their two mothers, Julia and Dinah, intensifies. The vindictive and mean-spirited Julia sees her daughter as a meal ticket, and dreads the day Taryn that turns 17 and becomes more financially independent. Rounding out the cast is Blair's friend Sara Frank (Anne Schedeen), a sensible lawyer, who is involved with Mark Bailey (Roscoe Born in a recurring role), a reporter doing a story on the fashion industry. Mark becomes enamored with Racine, much to the horror of Sara, who despite agreeing that she's "done well for a girl named off of a map of Wisconsin", warns that Racine has "been in more beds than a hotel breakfast tray!"

== Cast ==
=== Main ===
- Lloyd Bridges as Grant Harper
- Jennifer Warren as Dinah Caswell
- Brenda Vaccaro as Julia Blake
- Dack Rambo as Wesley Harper
- Mimi Rogers as Blair Harper Fenton
- Richard Beymer as David Fenton
- Anne Schedeen as Sara Frank
- John Bennett Perry as Michael Caswell
- Nancy Olson as Marjorie Harper
- Nicollette Sheridan as Taryn Blake
- Terry Farrell as Laurie Caswell
- Morgan Fairchild as Racine
- Lauren Hutton as Colette Ferrier (episodes 9–13)

=== Recurring ===
- Jeffrey Richman as Conrad
- Jonathan Frakes as Sandy Paris
- Roscoe Born as Mark Bailey
- Alan Fudge as Dr. Van Adams
- Mark Schneider as Sammy
- John Reilly as Jake Larner
- John Waite as himself
- Don Bowron as Chris York
- Sue Giosa as Marie
- Larry Linville as Grayson Carr
- Thom Mathews as Lewis Crosby

== Episodes ==
No.	Title	Directed by	Written by	Original release date	Viewers (millions)
1	"Pilot" "Laurie Taryn (Note: Although episodes were untitled when they originally aired in the US, they were each named after a different character when the show was broadcast in Germany. These titles appears at the beginning of each episode and are included in the German DVD release, which also splits the pilot episode into two parts.)"	Harry Winer	Story by : Jennifer Miller, Casey T. Mitchell & Leah Markus; Teleplay by : Jennifer Miller	September 23, 1984	18.4
2	"Episode no. 1" "Racine"	Arthur Allen Siedelman & Alan Smithee	Jennifer Miller	September 25, 1984	13.6
3	"Episode no. 2" "Grant"	Ralph Senensky	Donald Paul Roos	October 9, 1984	12.7
4	"Episode no. 3" "David"	Arthur Allen Siedelman & Alan Smithee	Jeff Stuart	October 16, 1984	12.1
5	"Episode no. 4" "Wesley"	Ralph Senensky	Michael L. Grace	October 23, 1984	14.8
6	"Episode no. 5" "Blair"	Edward Parone	Stephen Black & Henry Stern	October 30, 1984	10.4
7	"Episode no. 6" "Sara"	Ralph Senensky	Jill Gordon	November 13, 1984	12.0
8	"Episode no. 7" "Julia"	Leo Penn	Stephen Black & Henry Stern	November 20, 1984	12.1
9	"Episode no. 8" "Chris"	Edward Parone	Donald Paul Roos	November 27, 1984	9.9
10	"Episode no. 9" "Colette"	Leo Penn	Stephen Black & Henry Stern	December 4, 1984	12.6
11	"Episode no. 10" "Dinah"	Edward Parone	Carol Saraceno	December 11, 1984	9.3
12	"Episode no. 11" "Marjorie"	Leo Penn	Jill Gordon	December 18, 1984	9.9
13	"Episode no. 12" "Finale"	Edward Parone	Donald Paul Roos	December 25, 1984	10.1

== Syndication and international broadcast ==
Reruns of the series have been shown on the SOAPnet cable channel in the United States. The series was also shown in the United Kingdom by the ITV network in the mid-1980s, though schedules varied per region. It was also shown in Italy on Canale 5 under the name Il profumo del successo (The Taste of Success), and in Germany under the title Karussell der Puppen (Doll Carousel). In South America and Spain, it was broadcast as Muñecas de Papel. In Sweden, it was broadcast 1986 on TV2 under the name Modedockorna (The Fashion Dolls).

== Reception ==
The series attempted to ride the wave of popular glossy night time soaps, such as Dallas and Dynasty. When Paper Dolls premiered in September 1984, the first episode achieved an 18.4 rating, and featured the requisite stock pleasures of the genre, such as big business, glamour, intrigue, catfights and verbal spats (particularly between Racine and the other cast members). In one scene, Mark enters Racine's office while she is getting a massage, asking "Do you want me to wait outside until you're decent?" Racine responds "How much time do you have?" In another scene, an irate Julia, brandishing a Barbie-style fashion doll of her daughter, storms into Racine's office. "This will not be the new Taryn Blake doll!" she barks. "The eyes are brown!" Coolly, Racine quips, "I guess they couldn't quite match that bloodshot tone."

Even with a series of rave reviews in People urging viewers to give the show a chance, ratings were low and the series was not able to find an audience, due in large part because it had been pre-empted on some weeks by the baseball playoffs. The final episode of the series found David on the verge of failure after an influential fashion critic is blackmailed by Wesley and Racine to pan his new sportswear collection; Marjorie is feared dead in a plane crash; and Racine receives a call from Mark intimating that his digging into her secretive past and had uncovered something very interesting. The cliffhangers were left unresolved.
