= Ollie O'Toole =

American actor and impressionist (1912–1992)

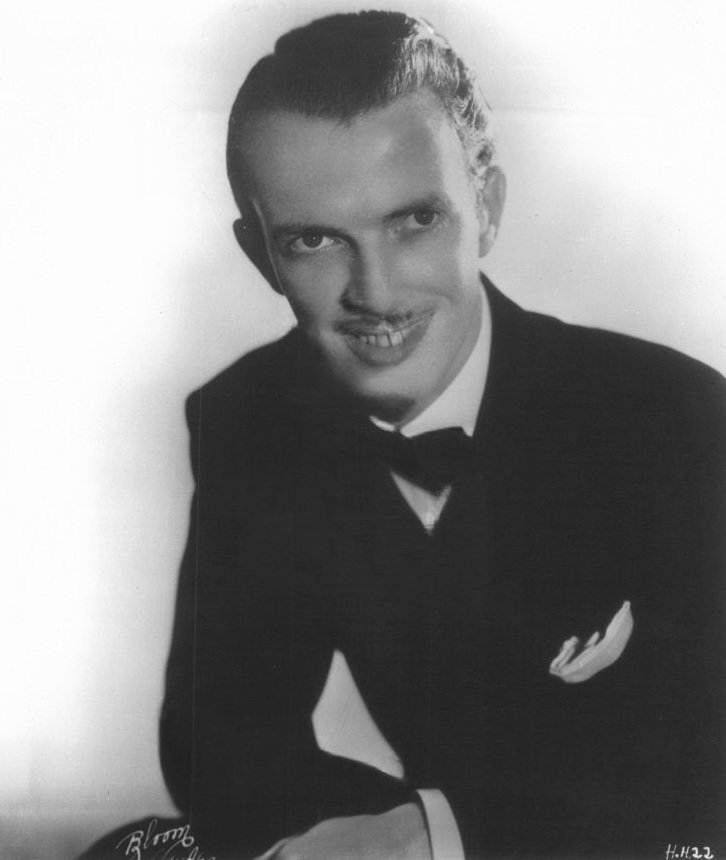
- O'Toole in 1942
- Born: April 2, 1912; Pittsburgh, Pennsylvania, U.S.
- Died: February 25, 1992 (aged 79); Los Angeles, California, U.S.
- Occupation(s): Actor, comedian, impressionist
- Years active: 1939–1984
- Children: 1

Ollie O'Toole (April 2, 1912 – February 25, 1992) was an American actor, comedian and impressionist.

== Biography ==
Born in Pittsburgh, Pennsylvania April 2, 1912. Around the year 1939, Horace Heidt recruited O'Toole to his orchestra. Ollie was an important partner on stage with Art Carney. He had a daughter called Maureen. He died on February 25, 1992, at the age of 79 in Los Angeles, California.

== Selected filmography ==
- Official Detective (1957) (Season 1 Episode 15: "The Jailhouse Gang") as Hudson (uncredited)
- The Oregon Trail (1959) as James Gordon Bennett
- Bat Masterson (1959) (Season 1 Episode 21: "Marked Deck") as Rinehart
- 20,000 Eyes (1961) as Moore
- The Alfred Hitchcock Hour (1964) (Season 2 Episode 14: "Beyond the Sea of Death") as Second Hotel Clerk
- Gunsmoke (1962-1965) (10 episodes)
  - (Season 7 Episode 17: "Cody's Code") (1962) as Postmaster
  - (Season 7 Episode 22: "The Gallows") (1962) as Milt
  - (Season 7 Episode 33: "The Prisoner") (1962) as Postmaster
  - (Season 8 Episode 4: "Root Down") (1962) as Clerk
  - (Season 8 Episode 31: "Panacea Sykes") (1963) as Telegrapher
  - (Season 8 Episode 33: "Quint-Cident") (1963) as Telegrapher
  - (Season 9 Episode 21: "The Bassops") (1964) as Telegrapher
  - (Season 9 Episode 33: "The Warden") (1964) as Telegrapher
  - (Season 9 Episode 36: "Journey For Three") (1964) as Telegrapher
  - (Season 10 Episode 32: "Bad Lady from Brookline") (1964) as Herb
- One of Our Spies Is Missing (1966)
- Lost In Space (TV series) (1965–1966) Episode: "My Friend Mr. Nobody" as Mr. Nobody (voice), "War of the Robots" as Robotoid (voice)
- The Virginian (1963-1970) (9 episodes)
  - (Season 1 Episode 19: "The Man Who Couldn't Die") (1963) as Ticketman
  - (Season 2 Episode 9: "Run Quiet") (1963) as Storekeeper
  - (Season 2 Episode 11: "The Fatal Journey") (1963) as Jackson
  - (Season 3 Episode 10: "Return a Stranger") (1964) as Roy Masters
  - (Season 3 Episode 11: "All Nice and Legal") (1964) as Joe Mapes
  - (Season 5 Episode 9: "Dead-Eye Dick") (1966) as Bank Teller
  - (Season 5 Episode 26: "A Welcoming Town") (1967) as Assayer
  - (Season 7 Episode 13: "Big Tiny") (1968) as Man
  - (Season 9 Episode 12: "Last of the Comancheros") (1970) as Proprietor

== Bibliography ==
- Pitts, Michael R. Western Movies: A Guide to 5,105 Feature Films. McFarland, 2012.
