= Praying Mantis (film) =

- Genre: Thriller; Drama
- Written by: William Delligan; Duane Poole
- Directed by: James Keach
- Starring: Jane Seymour; Barry Bostwick; Chad Allen; Frances Fisher
- Music by: John Debney
- Country of origin: United States
- Original language: English

Production
- Executive producers: James Keach; Jane Seymour
- Producers: Marjie Lundell; Robert M. Rolsky
- Cinematography: Ross Maehl
- Editor: Stanford C. Allen
- Running time: 90 minutes
- Production company: Paramount Television

Original release
- Network: Showtime
- Release: August 11, 1993

Praying Mantis is a 1993 American made-for-television psychological thriller film directed by James Keach, starring Jane Seymour, Barry Bostwick, Chad Allen and Frances Fisher.

== Plot ==
Linda Crandell (Seymour) is a mentally disturbed woman who seduces men and marries them before killing them.

== Cast ==
- Jane Seymour as Linda Crandell
- Barry Bostwick as Don McAndrews
- Chad Allen as Bobby McAndrews
- Frances Fisher as Betty
- Colby Chester as Agent Johnson
- Michael MacRae as Agent Broderick
- Anne Schedeen as Karen
