= Hans Petter Sjøli =

Norwegian journalist

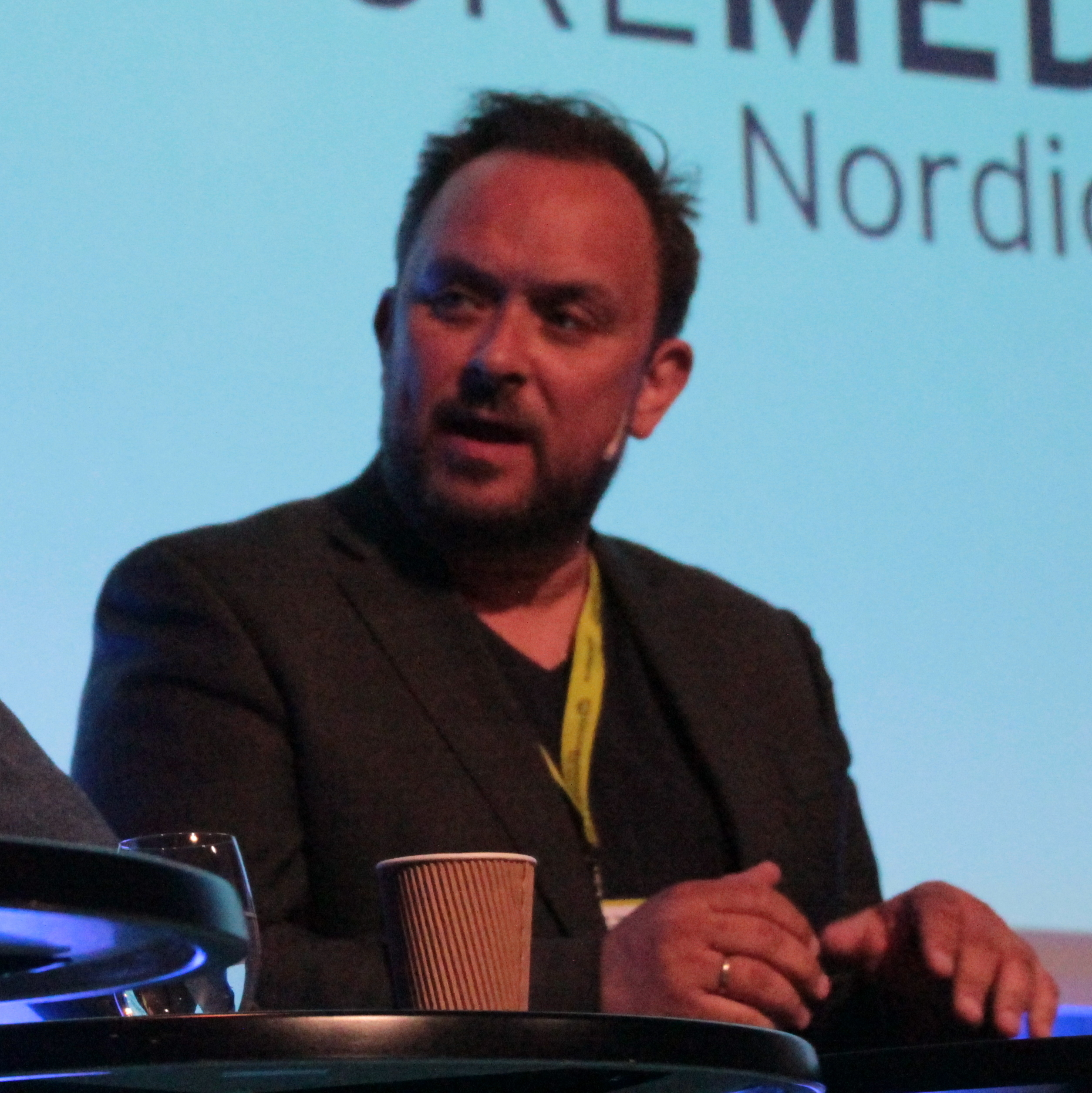
Hans Petter Sjøli, 2017

Hans Petter Sjøli (born 16 January 1974 in Steinkjer) is a Norwegian journalist for Dagsavisen and Klassekampen and author of the book Mao, min mao. Historien om AKPs vekst og fall, published by Cappelen forlag in 2005.

Sjøli studied history at Universitetet i Oslo, he also studied in Bergen and Trondheim. The Norwegian journalist formerly worked in Klassekampen and Dagens Næringsliv. Currently, he lives in Rodeløkka, Oslo with his family.
