= Sjölin =

Sjölin (pronounced [ɧœˈliːn]) is a surname of Swedish origin and may refer to:

- Åke Sjölin (1910–1999), Swedish diplomat
- Daniel Sjölin (born 1977), Swedish novelist and television presenter
- Gunnar Sjölin (1924–2015), Swedish speed skater
- Hilda Sjölin (1835–1915), Swedish photographer
- Ivar Sjölin (1918–1992), Swedish freestyle wrestler
- Stig Sjölin (1928–1995), Swedish middleweight boxer

== See also ==
- Sjödin
