= José Verdi =

Venezuelan volleyball player (born 1990)

Personal information
- Full name: José Manuel Enríquez Verdi
- Nationality: Venezuela
- Born: 6 February 1990 (age 35)
- Height: 1.96 m (6 ft 5 in)

Sport
- Sport: Volleyball

José Manuel Enríquez Verdi (born 6 February 1990) is a Venezuelan volleyball player. He competed in the 2020 Summer Olympics.
