= Holiday Heroes =

Bulgarian non-profit association

Holiday Heroes is a Bulgarian non-profit association that aims to help socially disadvantaged families, elderly people, single mothers and people with disabilities, by delivering foodstuffs to their homes.

== History ==
Holiday Heroes was launched in Bulgaria in 2012. It was initiated by Michael Straumietis, owner of Advanced Nutrients company. Campaigns take place at Christmas and Easter each year. The aim of the initiative is to support in need families, elderly people, single parents and persons with disabilities with the help of celebrities and big companies. It also addresses people living outside Bulgaria. The association's slogan is "Love in Action."

== Promotion ==
The Holiday Heroes has an online presence on social media.

Holiday Heroes campaigns are supported by Bulgarian media, including, bTV, the Bulgarian National Television (BNT), Nova TV, the Bulgarian National Radio (BNR), Darik Radio, and Hello! Bulgaria.

== Holiday campaigns ==
List of campaigns and number of families included:

- Christmas 2012 – 1,000 families
- Easter 2013 – 2,000 families
- Christmas 2013 – 5,000 families
- Easter 2014

== Representatives ==
Holiday Heroes has been supported by athletes such as CSKA volleyball club, Ivan Zarev, and Thomas Lafchis, as well as musicians including Billy the Kid, Mihaela Fileva, Spens, Redman, Veselin Marinov, and Anelia, and actors Bashar Rahal and Anne Schedeen.

== Supporting events ==
Holiday Heroes organizes supporting events which include holiday workshops, art bazaars, and charity auctions of items and personal belongings of local celebrities to sports tournaments, charity gala dinners and concerts.
