= 2026–27 Galatasaray S.K. (men's volleyball) season =

Turkish volleyball club season

Galatasaray Madeş Mobilya
2026–27 season
- President: Dursun Özbek
- Head coach: Andrea Gardini
- Arena: TVF Burhan Felek Sport Hall
- Turkish Men's Volleyball League: Regular season
- CEV Champions League: Preseason
- Turkish Men's Volleyball Super Cup: Winners
- Turkish Men's Volleyball Cup: Regular season

It is the 2026–27 season of the Men's Volleyball team of Galatasaray Sports Club.

== Season overview ==
=== Pre-season ===
On 18 July, Selçuk Keskin has been appointed as the assistant coach of the Galatasaray Men's Volleyball Team.

On 18 July, Francesco Garrera has been appointed as the conditioning coach for the Galatasaray Men's Volleyball Team.

On 13 August, SMS Group Efeler League 2026–27 Volleyball Season Fixtures Have Been Drawn.

On 8 October, Adnan Paşaoğlu has been appointed as the assistant coach of the Galatasaray Men's Volleyball Team.

=== October ===
On 12 October, Galatasaray became the champion of the Turkish Men's Volleyball Super Cup.

== Sponsorship and kit manufacturers ==
- Supplier: Puma
- Name sponsor: Madeş Mobilya
- Main sponsor: Madeş Mobilya
- Back sponsor: —
- Sleeve sponsor: —
- Lateral sponsor: —
- Short sponsor: —
- Socks sponsor: —

== Technical staff ==
As of 8 October 2026

Name	Job
(Turkey) Neslihan Turan	Administrative Manager of Volleyball Teams
(Turkey) Beril Kefeli	Assistant Administrative Manager
(Turkey) Mehmetcan Şamlı	Men's Volleyball Team Manager
(Italy) Andrea Gardini	Head Coach
(Turkey) Selçuk Keskin	Assistant Coach
(Turkey) Furkan Kasap	Assistant Coach
(Turkey) Adnan Paşaoğlu	Assistant Coach
(Turkey) Mertcan Kır	Statistics Coach
(Italy) Francesco Garrera	Conditioner
(Turkey) Yalçın Ayhan	Physiotherapist
(Turkey) Emre Yanık	Physiotherapist
(Turkey) Ali Tufan	Outfitter
(Turkey) Defne Heybeli	Corporate Communications and Media Officer

=== Staff changes ===
Change	Date	Staff member	Staff position	Ref.
In	18 July 2026	(Turkey) Selçuk Keskin	Assistant Coach	
In	18 July 2026	(Italy) Francesco Garrera	Conditioner	
Out	August 2026	(Poland) Mateusz Jakub Nykiel	Assistant Coach	
Out	August 2026	(Turkey) Turgay Aslanyürek	Conditioner	
Out	August 2026	(Turkey) Mustafa Yurdaer Kobal	Assistant Administrative Manager	
In	August 2026	(Turkey) Beril Kefeli	Assistant Administrative Manager	
Out	October 2026	(Turkey) Cihan Çintay	Assistant Coach	
In	8 October 2026	(Turkey) Adnan Paşaoğlu	Assistant Coach	

== Team roster ==
As of 11 November 2026

No.	Player	Position	Date of Birth	Height (m)	Country
1	Yiğit Savaş Kaplan	Middle-blocker	10 January 2004 (age 22)	2.07	Turkey
4	Abdulsamet Yalçın	Libero	25 January 2000 (age 26)	1.90	Turkey
5	Cafer Kirkit	Outside Hitter	1 January 2001 (age 25)	1.93	Turkey
6	Gökçen Yüksel	Outside Hitter	11 July 2004 (age 22)	2.04	Turkey
7	Micah Maʻa	Setter	16 April 1997 (age 29)	1.92	United States
9	Jean Patry	Opposite	27 December 1996 (age 29)	2.07	France
11	Fatih Yörümez	Libero	11 March 2000 (age 26)	1.83	Turkey
12	Özgür Benzer	Setter	1 February 2005 (age 21)	1.97	Turkey
13	Stephen Maar	Outside Hitter	6 December 1994 (age 31)	1.99	Canada
14	Faik Samet Güneş	Middle-blocker	27 May 1993 (age 33)	2.03	Turkey
16	Emirhan Özçelik	Outside Hitter	26 June 2006 (age 20)	2.01	Turkey
17	Doğukan Ulu	Middle-blocker	30 October 1995 (age 31)	2.05	Turkey
21	Roamy Alonso	Middle-blocker	24 July 1997 (age 29)	2.03	Cuba
22	Emir Pınar	Middle-blocker	20 August 2001 (age 25)	1.97	Turkey
77	Can Koç	Opposite	29 April 2003 (age 23)	2.00	Turkey
99	Ramazan Efe Mandıracı	Outside Hitter	1 April 2002 (age 24)	2.03	Turkey

== Transfers ==
=== New contracts ===
Date	Player	Contract length	Source
16 July 2026	(Turkey) Arslan Ekşi	1-year	
18 July 2026	(Turkey) Doğukan Ulu	1-year	
27 July 2026	(Cuba) Roamy Alonso	1-year	

=== Contract extensions ===
Date	Player	Contract length	Source
2 November 2026	(Turkey) Gökçen Yüksel	3-year	

=== Transfers in ===
Date	Player	Transferred from	Type	Fee	Source
20 July 2026	(Turkey) Abdulsamet Yalçın	(Turkey) İstanbul Gençlik Spor Kulübü	2-year	Free	
22 July 2026	(Turkey) Emir Pınar	(Turkey) Altekma SK	2-year	Free	
24 July 2026	(Turkey) Yiğit Savaş Kaplan	(Turkey) İstanbul Gençlik Spor Kulübü	3-year	Free	
29 July 2026	(Turkey) Özgür Benzer	(Turkey) İBB Spor Kulübü	3-year	Free	
31 July 2026	(Turkey) Fatih Yörümez	(Turkey) İBB Spor Kulübü	2-year	Free	
3 August 2026	(United States) Micah Maʻa	(Russia) Fakel Novy Urengoy	1-year + 1-year	Free	
5 August 2026	(Turkey) Cafer Kirkit	(Turkey) Altekma SK	1-year	Free	
7 August 2026	(Turkey) Ramazan Efe Mandıracı	(Italy) Gas Sales Bluenergy Piacenza	2-year	Free	
13 August 2026	(Turkey) Emirhan Özçelik	(Turkey) Galatasaray ll	1-year	Free	

=== Transfers out ===
Date	Player	Transferred to	Fee	Source
5 June 2026	(Turkey) Hasan Yeşilbudak	(Turkey) Spor Toto Spor Kulübü	End of contract	
5 June 2026	(Turkey) Ahmet Tümer	(Turkey) Ziraat Bankkart	End of contract	
6 June 2026	(Turkey) Caner Ergül	(Turkey) Sultanbeyli Belediyespor	End of contract	
6 June 2026	(United States) Michael Wright	(Poland) Aluron CMC Warta Zawiercie	End of contract	
7 June 2026	(Turkey) Hacı Şahin	(Turkey) Onikişubat Belediye Spor Kulübü	End of contract	
7 June 2026	(Bulgaria) Georgi Tatarov	(Italy) Power Volley Milano	End of contract	
9 June 2026	(United States) Thomas Jaeschke	(Italy) Valsa Group Modena	End of contract	
15 July 2026	(Turkey) Onur Günaydı	(Turkey) ON Hotels Alanya Belediyespor	End of contract	
11 November 2026	(Turkey) Arslan Ekşi	(Turkey) İstanbul Gençlik Spor Kulübü	Contract termination	

== Pre-season and friendlies ==
Date	Time		Score		Set 1	Set 2	Set 3	Set 4	Set 5	Total	Report
10 September 2026	–	Galatasaray (Turkey)	–	(Turkey) İstanbul Gençlik Spor Kulübü	–	–	–	–	–	0–0	Report
16 September 2026	–	Galatasaray (Turkey)	–	(Turkey) İBB Spor Kulübü	–	–	–	–	–	0–0	Report
24 September 2026	–	Galatasaray (Turkey)	–	(Turkey) Sultanbeyli Belediyespor	–	–	–	–	–	0–0	Report
26 September 2026	–	Galatasaray (Turkey)	–	(Turkey) İBB Spor Kulübü	–	–	–	–	–	0–0	Report
3 October 2026	–	Galatasaray (Turkey)	–	(Turkey) Halkbank Spor Kulübü	–	–	–	–	–	0–0	Report

== Competitions ==
=== Turkish Men's Volleyball League ===
==== Regular season (1st Half) ====
- All times are Europe Time (UTC+03:00).

Date	Time		Score		Set 1	Set 2	Set 3	Set 4	Set 5	Total	Report
17 October 2026	16:00	Halkbank Spor Kulübü	3–1	Galatasaray Madeş Mobilya	23–25	25–20	27–25	25–23	–	100–93	Report 1 Report 2
24 October 2026	13:00	Galatasaray Madeş Mobilya	3–0	Akedaş Onikişubat Belediyespor	25–14	25–20	31–29	–	–	81–63	Report 1 Report 2
27 October 2026	16:30	Sungurlu Belediyespor	1–3	Galatasaray Madeş Mobilya	24–26	19–25	25–19	21–25	–	89–95	Report 1 Report 2
31 October 2026	19:00	Galatasaray Madeş Mobilya	3–0	Sultanbeyli Belediyespor	25–23	25–17	25–22	–	–	75–62	Report 1 Report 2
7 November 2026	14:00	İstanbul Gençlik Spor Kulübü	1–3	Galatasaray Madeş Mobilya	25–18	15–25	26–28	23–25	–	89–96	Report 1 Report 2
14 November 2026	19:00	Galatasaray Madeş Mobilya	2–3	Fenerbahçe Medicana	25–21	25–19	23–25	18–25	13–15	104–105	Report 1 Report 2
21 November 2026	16:00	Ziraat Bankkart	3–0	Galatasaray Madeş Mobilya	25–18	25–23	32–30	–	–	82–71	Report 1 Report 2
28 November 2026	19:00	Galatasaray Madeş Mobilya	–	Gaziantep Gençlik Spor	–	–	–	–	–	0–0	Report
5 December 2026	16:00	ON Hotels Alanya Belediyespor	–	Galatasaray Madeş Mobilya	–	–	–	–	–	0–0	Report
12 December 2026	16:00	Galatasaray Madeş Mobilya	–	İBB Spor Kulübü	–	–	–	–	–	0–0	Report
19 December 2026	13:00	Gebze Belediyesi Spor Kulübü	–	Galatasaray Madeş Mobilya	–	–	–	–	–	0–0	Report
22 December 2026	16:30	Galatasaray Madeş Mobilya	–	Altekma SK	–	–	–	–	–	0–0	Report
26 December 2026	19:00	Galatasaray Madeş Mobilya	–	Spor Toto Spor Kulübü	–	–	–	–	–	0–0	Report

==== Regular season (2nd Half) ====
- All times are Europe Time (UTC+03:00).

Date	Time		Score		Set 1	Set 2	Set 3	Set 4	Set 5	Total	Report
–	–	Galatasaray Madeş Mobilya	–	Halkbank Spor Kulübü	–	–	–	–	–	0–0	
–	–	Akedaş Onikişubat Belediyespor	–	Galatasaray Madeş Mobilya	–	–	–	–	–	0–0	
–	–	Galatasaray Madeş Mobilya	–	Sungurlu Belediyespor	–	–	–	–	–	0–0	
–	–	Sultanbeyli Belediyespor	–	Galatasaray Madeş Mobilya	–	–	–	–	–	0–0	
–	–	Galatasaray Madeş Mobilya	–	İstanbul Gençlik Spor Kulübü	–	–	–	–	–	0–0	
–	–	Fenerbahçe Medicana	–	Galatasaray Madeş Mobilya	–	–	–	–	–	0–0	
–	–	Galatasaray Madeş Mobilya	–	Ziraat Bankkart	–	–	–	–	–	0–0	
–	–	Gaziantep Gençlik Spor	–	Galatasaray Madeş Mobilya	–	–	–	–	–	0–0	
–	–	Galatasaray Madeş Mobilya	–	ON Hotels Alanya Belediyespor	–	–	–	–	–	0–0	
–	–	İBB Spor Kulübü	–	Galatasaray Madeş Mobilya	–	–	–	–	–	0–0	
–	–	Galatasaray Madeş Mobilya	–	Gebze Belediyesi Spor Kulübü	–	–	–	–	–	0–0	
–	–	Altekma SK	–	Galatasaray Madeş Mobilya	–	–	–	–	–	0–0	
–	–	Spor Toto Spor Kulübü	–	Galatasaray Madeş Mobilya	–	–	–	–	–	0–0	

=== CEV Champions League ===
==== League round ====
===== Pool A =====
Pos	Team	Pld	W	L	Pts	SW	SL	SR	SPW	SPL	SPR
1	(Germany) Berlin Recycling Volleys	0	0	0	0	0	0	—	0	0	—
2	(Turkey) Galatasaray HDI	0	0	0	0	0	0	—	0	0	—
3	(Greece) Panathinaikos Athens	0	0	0	0	0	0	—	0	0	—
4	(N/A) Qualifier	0	0	0	0	0	0	—	0	0	—

First match(es) will be played: 8 December 2026. Source: CEV

=== Turkish Men's Volleyball Super Cup ===
==== Final ====
- All times are Europe Time (UTC+03:00).

Date	Time		Score		Set 1	Set 2	Set 3	Set 4	Set 5	Total	Report
12 October 2026	19:30	Ziraat Bankası	1–3	Galatasaray Madeş Mobilya	22–25	21–25	25–19	21–25	–	89–94	Report 1 Report 2

=== Turkish Men's Volleyball Cup ===
==== Quarterfinals ====
- All times are Europe Time (UTC+03:00).

Date	Time		Score		Set 1	Set 2	Set 3	Set 4	Set 5	Total	Report
11 November 2026	19:00	Galatasaray Madeş Mobilya	3–0	Gebze Belediyesi Spor Kulübü	25–16	25–18	26–24	–	–	76–58	Report 1 Report 2
