= 2026 FIVB Men's Volleyball Nations League squads =

This article shows the roster of all the participating teams at the 2026 FIVB Men's Volleyball Nations League. Each team names a full list of up to 30 players, but only 12 to 14 players can be used in a week, chosen from the full list.

== Argentina ==
The following was Argentina's roster at the 2026 Men's Volleyball Nations League.

Head coach: (Argentina) Horacio Dileo

- 1 Matías Sánchez S
- 2 Lucas Conde OH
- 3 Jan Martínez Franchi OH
- 4 Joaquín Gallego MB
- 5 Tobías Scarpa L
- 6 Germán Gómez OP
- 7 Luciano Palonsky OH
- 8 Agustín Loser MB
- 9 Santiago Danani L
- 10 Fausto Díaz OH
- 11 Manuel Armoa OH
- 12 Bruno Lima OP
- 13 Pablo Urchevich S
- 14 Ezequiel Vázquez S
- 16 Pablo Kukartsev OH
- 17 Luciano Vicentín OH
- 19 Gustavo Maciel MB
- 20 Federico Trucco L
- 21 Pablo Denis Cabañas OP
- 22 Nicolás Zerba MB
- 23 Imanol Salazar MB
- 24 Lucas Astegiano S
- 25 Nehuén D'Aversa S
- 26 Leonardo Herbsommer MB
- 27 Emiliano Molini MB
- 29 Ignacio Luengas OH
- 77 Matías Giraudo S

== Belgium ==
The following was Belgium's roster at the 2026 Men's Volleyball Nations League.

Head coach: (Italy) Emanuele Zanini

- 2 Ferre Reggers OP
- 4 Stijn D'Hulst S
- 6 Simon Plaskie OH
- 7 Lennert Van Elsen MB
- 8 Michiel Fransen OH
- 9 Wout D'Heer MB
- 12 Seppe Rotty OH
- 13 Kobe Verwimp L
- 15 Basil Dermaux OP
- 16 Matthias Valkiers S
- 17 Warre Vandecruys OP
- 18 Seppe Baetens OH
- 19 Gorik Lantsoght L
- 21 Samuel Fafchamps MB
- 23 Pierre Perin OH

== Brazil ==
The following was Brazil's roster at the 2026 Men's Volleyball Nations League.

Head coach: (Brazil) Bernardo Rezende

- 1 Darlan Souza OP
- 2 Welinton Oppenkoski OP
- 3 Thiery Nascimento MB
- 4 Gabriel Bieler S
- 5 Matheus Gonçalves S
- 6 Adriano Xavier OH
- 7 Matheus "Pinta" Santos MB
- 8 Henrique Honorato OH
- 9 Leonardo Lukas Leodolter OH
- 10 Maicon França OH
- 11 Judson Nunes MB
- 12 Douglas Souza OH
- 13 Lucas Barreto MB
- 14 Fernando "Cachopa" Kreling S
- 15 Maique Reis L
- 16 Douglas Pureza L
- 17 Bryan Silva OP
- 18 Ricardo Lucarelli OH
- 19 Arthur Bento OH
- 20 Lukas Bergmann OH
- 21 Guilherme Voss MB
- 22 Chizoba Neves OP
- 23 Flávio Gualberto MB
- 24 Rhendrick Resley S
- 25 Paulo Vinicios Silva OH
- 26 Samuel Neufeld OP
- 28 Alexandre Elias L
- 29 Filipe Stolberg L
- 30 Guilherme Sabino OP

== Bulgaria ==
The following was Bulgaria's roster at the 2026 Men's Volleyball Nations League

Head coach: (Italy) Gianlorenzo Blengini

- 1 Simeon Nikolov S
- 2 Krasimir Georgiev MB
- 3 Iliya Petkov MB
- 4 Martin Atanasov OH
- 5 Boris Nachev MB
- 6 Kristian Titriyski OP
- 7 Rangel Vitekov S
- 8 Asparuh Asparuhov OH
- 9 Vladimir Garkov OH
- 10 Denis Karyagin OH
- 11 Aleks Grozdanov MB
- 12 Georgi Tatarov OH
- 13 Dimitar Dimitrov OP
- 14 Martin Bozhilov L
- 15 Rusi Zhelev L
- 16 Hristiyan Dimitrov OP
- 17 Samuil Valchinov OH
- 18 Venislav Antov OP
- 19 Denislav Bardarov OH
- 20 Stoil Palev S
- 21 Simeon Dobrev L
- 22 Damyan Kolev OH
- 23 Aleksandar Nikolov OH
- 24 Lazar Bouchkov MB
- 25 Lyuboslav Telkiyski S
- 26 Svetoslav Ivanov OH
- 27 Zhasmin Velichkov OH
- 28 Kiril Kolev MB
- 29 Preslav Petkov MB
- 30 Aleksandar Kandev OH

== Canada ==
The following was Canada's roster at the 2026 Men's Volleyball Nations League.

Head coach: (Canada) Daniel Lewis

- 1 Daenan Gyimah MB
- 2 Luke Herr S
- 3 Jesse Elser OH
- 5 Brodie Hofer OH
- 6 Erik Siksna OH
- 7 Jackson Howe MB
- 8 Mason Greves S
- 9 Matthew Neaves OP
- 10 Ryan Sclater OP
- 11 Xander Ketrzynski OP
- 12 Liam Kristjanson MB
- 13 Max Elgert S
- 15 Jackson Young OH
- 16 Jordan Schnitzer MB
- 18 Justin Lui L
- 19 Jackson Corneil MB
- 20 Jordan Canham OP
- 22 Isaac Heslinga OH
- 23 Jonas Van Huizen OH
- 24 Tomas Sorra S
- 26 Cory Schoenherr MB
- 30 Cole Duncanson MB
- 33 Fynn McCarthy MB
- 77 Brendan Mills OP
- 87 Zachary Hollands L
- 88 Darian Picklyk L
- 91 Jeremy Love S
- 95 Kaden Schmidt OH
- 97 Landon Currie L
- 99 Skyler Varga OH

== China ==
The following was China's roster at the 2026 Men's Volleyball Nations League.

Head coach: Vital Heynen

- 1 Wen Zihua OP
- 2 Jiang Chuan OP
- 3 Wang Hebin S
- 4 Li Lei OH
- 5 Hu Hanlin MB
- 6 Yu Yuantai OH
- 7 Li Tianyue L
- 8 Wang Dongchen MB
- 9 Li Yongzhen MB
- 10 Ji Daoshuai OH
- 11 Wu Zhai S
- 12 Zhang Zhejia MB
- 13 Fan Xuanyu S
- 14 Sun Qingsong L
- 15 Peng Shikun MB
- 16 Qu Zongshuai L
- 18 Wang Changli MB
- 19 Zhou Xin OH
- 20 Chen Leiyang S
- 22 Zhang Jingyin OH
- 23 Wang Bin OH
- 24 Yang Baoqi OH
- 25 Li Hai OP
- 26 Wu Haoze OH
- 27 Xue Zhihong OH
- 28 Zhai Dejun OH
- 29 Lin Ridong L
- 30 Liu Libin OH
- 31 Zou Xuyuan OP
- 32 Rao Shuhan MB

== Cuba ==
The following was Cuba's roster at the 2026 Men's Volleyball Nations League.

Head coach: (Cuba) Jesús Ángel Cruz

- 1 José Masso MB
- 2 Osniel Melgarejo OH
- 4 Michael Sánchez OP
- 5 Javier Concepción MB
- 6 Alejandro González OP
- 7 Yonder García L
- 8 Julio Gómez S
- 11 Liván Taboada S
- 13 Robertlandy Simón MB
- 14 Yordan Bisset OP
- 15 Bryan Camino L
- 16 Yusniel González Marti OH
- 18 Miguel Ángel López OH
- 19 Endriel Pedroso MB
- 20 Thiago Suárez MB
- 21 Roamy Alonso MB
- 22 José Miguel Gutiérrez OH
- 23 Marlon Yant OH
- 24 Alain Gourguet L
- 25 David Fiel MB
- 28 Christian Thondike S
- 29 Adrián Chirino S
- 30 Daniel Martínez OP
- 31 Carlos Charles OP
- 32 Víctor Andreu OH
- 35 Dayron Gallego L

== France ==
The following was France's roster at the 2026 Men's Volleyball Nations League.

Head coach: (Italy) Andrea Giani

- 1 Barthélémy Chinenyeze MB
- 2 Jenia Grebennikov L
- 3 Amir Tizi-Oualou S
- 4 Jean Patry OP
- 5 Alexandre Strehlau OH
- 6 Benjamin Toniutti S
- 9 Earvin N'Gapeth OH
- 11 Antoine Brizard S
- 12 Anatole Chaboissant S
- 14 Nicolas Le Goff MB
- 15 Mathis Henno OH
- 17 Trévor Clévenot OH
- 19 Yacine Louati OH
- 20 Benjamin Diez L
- 21 Théo Faure OP
- 23 Timothée Carle OH
- 24 Moussé Gueye MB
- 25 Quentin Jouffroy MB
- 30 François Huetz MB
- 31 Joris Seddik MB
- 32 Henri Léon OP
- 33 Antoine Pothron OH
- 35 Simon Magnin MB
- 37 Luca Ramon L
- 38 Nathan Feral OP
- 39 Nathan Canovas OH
- 40 Noa Duflos Rossi OH
- 42 Jules Duthoit MB

== Germany ==
The following was Germany's roster at the 2026 Men's Volleyball Nations League.

Head coach: (Italy) Massimo Botti

- 1 Fabian Hosch S
- 2 Leonard Graven L
- 4 Daniel Malescha OP
- 6 Johannes Tille S
- 7 Joscha Kunstmann MB
- 8 Filip John OP
- 9 György Grozer OP
- 16 Tim Peter OH
- 17 Jan Zimmermann S
- 18 Florian Krage MB
- 19 Erik Röhrs OH
- 21 Tobias Krick MB
- 22 Tobias Brand OH
- 23 Yannick Goralik MB
- 24 Eric Burggräf S
- 25 Lukas Maase MB
- 26 Simon Kohn OH
- 28 Max Schulz OH
- 29 Moritz Eckardt L
- 31 Yann Böhme OP
- 32 Theo Mohwinkel OH
- 33 Simon Valentin Torwie MB
- 34 Leon Meier OH
- 35 Lovis Homberger OP
- 37 Bastian Korreck MB
- 38 Carl Möller MB
- 41 Jannes Wiesner OH
- 45 Anselm Rein S
- 46 Maximilian Treiter L
- 47 Arthur Wehner S

== Iran ==
The following was Iran's roster at the 2026 Men's Volleyball Nations League.

Head coach: (Italy) Roberto Piazza

- 1 Amir Mohammad Golzadeh OP
- 3 Seyed Amirhossein Sadati OH
- 6 Bardia Saadat OP
- 7 Ehsan Daneshdoust OH
- 8 Mohammad Reza Hazratpour L
- 9 Poriya Hossein Khanzadeh OH
- 10 Amin Esmaeilnezhad OP
- 11 Matin Ahmadi MB
- 12 Amirhossein Esfandiar OH
- 13 Ali Ramezani S
- 14 Javad Karimi S
- 15 Arshia Behnezhad S
- 16 Amir Pazhouman OH
- 17 Ali Hajipour OP
- 18 Alireza Abdolhamidi OH
- 20 Yousef Kazemi MB
- 21 Arman Salehi L
- 22 Ali Haghparast OH
- 23 Mehran Tavanay L
- 24 Emran Kook Jili S
- 25 Armin Ghelichniazi MB
- 27 Mohammad Valizadeh MB
- 30 Mobin Nasri OH
- 31 Ilshan Davoodipour S
- 33 Alireza Moslehabadi MB
- 44 Amirhasan Molaabasi MB
- 49 Morteza Sharifi OH
- 52 Pouya Ariakhah OP
- 66 Seyed Eisa Naseri MB
- 77 Shayan Mehrabi MB

== Italy ==
The following was Italy's roster at the 2026 Men's Volleyball Nations League.

Head coach: (Italy) Ferdinando De Giorgi

- 1 Giulio Pinali OP
- 2 Paolo Porro S
- 3 Francesco Recine OH
- 4 Gabriele Laurenzano L
- 5 Alessandro Michieletto OH
- 6 Simone Giannelli S
- 7 Fabio Balaso L
- 8 Riccardo Sbertoli S
- 9 Francesco Sani OH
- 10 Fabrizio Gironi OH
- 11 Kamil Rychlicki OP
- 12 Mattia Bottolo OH
- 13 Lorenzo Cortesia MB
- 14 Gianluca Galassi MB
- 15 Daniele Lavia OH
- 16 Yuri Romanò OP
- 17 Simone Anzani MB
- 18 Giovanni Sanguinetti MB
- 19 Roberto Russo MB
- 20 Federico Crosato MB
- 21 Davide Gardini OH
- 22 Marco Gaggini L
- 23 Alessandro Bovolenta OP
- 24 Tim Held OH
- 25 Giovanni Gargiulo MB
- 26 Mattia Boninfante S
- 27 Edoardo Caneschi MB
- 28 Domenico Pace L
- 30 Francesco Comparoni MB
- 31 Luca Porro OH

== Japan ==
The following was Japan's roster at the 2026 Men's Volleyball Nations League.

Head coach: (France) Laurent Tillie

- 1 Yuji Nishida OP
- 2 Taishi Onodera MB
- 3 Akihiro Fukatsu S
- 4 Kento Miyaura OP
- 5 Tatsunori Otsuka OH
- 6 Akihiro Yamauchi MB
- 7 Yudai Arai OH
- 9 Masaki Oya S
- 11 Shoma Tomita OH
- 12 Ran Takahashi OH
- 13 Tomohiro Ogawa L
- 14 Yūki Ishikawa OH
- 15 Kai Masato OH
- 16 Go Murayama MB
- 17 Keigo Nishimoto MB
- 18 Hiroto Nishiyama OP
- 20 Tomohiro Yamamoto L
- 21 Motoki Eiro S
- 22 Soshi Fujinaka L
- 23 Larry Evbade-Dan MB
- 24 Keihan Takahashi OP
- 25 Ryo Shimokawa S
- 26 Akito Yamazaki OH
- 29 Hiromasa Miwa MB
- 30 Keitaro Nishikawa MB
- 31 Yuki Imahashi S
- 32 Shunichiro Sato MB
- 33 Keishiro Takaki L
- 34 Rikuto Goto OH
- 38 Daiki Yamada OH

== Poland ==
The following was Poland's roster at the 2026 Men's Volleyball Nations League.

Head coach: (Serbia) Nikola Grbić

- 1 Aliaksei Nasevich OP
- 3 Jakub Popiwczak L
- 4 Marcin Komenda S
- 5 Mikołaj Sawicki OH
- 6 Bartosz Kurek OP
- 8 Mateusz Czunkiewicz L
- 9 Wilfredo León OH
- 10 Bartosz Bednorz OH
- 11 Aleksander Śliwka OH
- 12 Artur Szalpuk OH
- 13 Rafał Szymura OH
- 14 Kuba Hawryluk L
- 15 Jakub Kochanowski MB
- 16 Kamil Semeniuk OH
- 18 Maksymilian Granieczny L
- 20 Seweryn Lipiński MB
- 21 Tomasz Fornal OH
- 22 Kajetan Kubicki S
- 23 Jordan Zaleszczyk MB
- 27 Michał Gierżot OH
- 30 Bartłomiej Bołądź OP
- 31 Sebastian Adamczyk MB
- 34 Szymon Jakubiszak MB
- 35 Kewin Sasak OP
- 44 Łukasz Kozub S
- 50 Bartosz Gomułka OP
- 72 Mateusz Poręba MB
- 73 Jakub Nowak MB
- 96 Jan Firlej S
- 99 Norbert Huber MB

== Serbia ==
The following was Serbia's roster at the 2026 Men's Volleyball Nations League.

Head coach: (Romania) Gheorghe Crețu

- 1 Dušan Nikolić OP
- 2 Danilo Veselić S
- 3 Ignjat Dopudj OH
- 4 Veljko Mašulović OH
- 5 Matija Milanović S
- 6 Vukasin Ristić L
- 7 Stefan Negić L
- 8 Marko Ivović OH
- 9 Nikola Jovović S
- 10 Miran Kujundžić OH
- 11 Aleksa Batak S
- 12 Pavle Perić OH
- 13 Vladimir Gajović MB
- 14 Luka Stanković OP
- 15 Nemanja Mašulović MB
- 16 Dražen Luburić OP
- 17 Lazar Jeremić L
- 18 Dusan Petrović MB
- 19 Aleksandar Stefanović MB
- 21 Vuk Todorović S
- 22 Nikola Brborić OH
- 23 Aleksa Mandić OH
- 24 Vuk Kulpinac OP
- 25 Stefan Kokeza MB
- 26 Uroš Mišković L
- 29 Aleksandar Nedeljković MB
- 31 Nemanja Antunović MB
- 35 Andrej Rudić MB

== Slovenia ==
The following was Slovenia's roster at the 2026 Men's Volleyball Nations League.

Head coach: (Italy) Fabio Soli

- 1 Tonček Štern OP
- 2 Alen Pajenk MB
- 3 Uroš Planinšič S
- 4 Jan Kozamernik MB
- 6 Urban Toman L
- 7 Luka Marovt OH
- 8 Rok Bračko OH
- 9 Dejan Vinčić S
- 10 Sašo Štalekar MB
- 11 Vid Ranc OH
- 12 Grega Okroglič L
- 13 Jani Kovačič L
- 14 Žiga Štern OH
- 15 Jaka Sešek OP
- 16 Gregor Ropret S
- 17 Tine Urnaut OH
- 18 Klemen Čebulj OH
- 19 Rok Možič OH
- 20 Nik Mujanović OP
- 21 Gregor Pernuš S
- 22 Janž Janez Kržič MB
- 23 Jošt Kržič MB
- 24 Nejc Najdič S
- 25 Klemen Šen OH
- 26 Miha Fink MB

== Turkey ==
The following was Turkey's roster at the 2026 Men's Volleyball Nations League.

Head coach: (Turkey) Umut Çakır

- 1 Kaan Gürbüz OP
- 2 Berk Dilmenler OP
- 3 Ahmet Tümer MB
- 4 Ertuğrul Gazi Metin MB
- 5 Mert Matić MB
- 6 Vahit Emre Savaş MB
- 7 Bedirhan Bülbül MB
- 9 Ramazan Efe Mandıracı OH
- 11 Mirza Lagumdžija OH
- 12 Adis Lagumdžija OP
- 13 Yiğit Gülmezoğlu OH
- 14 Gökçen Yüksel OH
- 15 Tuna Uzunkol MB
- 16 Beytullah Hatipoğlu L
- 17 Murat Yenipazar S
- 18 Doğukan Yaltıraklı S
- 19 Berkay Bayraktar L
- 20 Efe Bayram OH
- 21 Mert Cuci MB
- 22 Onur Günaydı OH
- 23 Muhammed Kaya S
- 25 Umut Özdemir L
- 33 Hilmi Şahin S
- 36 Özgür Benzer S
- 38 Abdulsamet Yalçın L
- 53 Arda Bostan S
- 55 Cafer Kirkit OH
- 59 Can Koç OP
- 77 Yiğit Savaş Kaplan MB
- 96 Yiğit Hamza Aslan OH

== Ukraine ==
The following was the Ukraine' roster at the 2026 Men's Volleyball Nations League.

Head coach: (Argentina) Raúl Lozano

- 1 Maksym Drozd MB
- 2 Dmytro Teryomenko MB
- 3 Eduard Shteryk OH
- 4 Dmytro Shapoval OP
- 6 Tonkonoh Maksym OP
- 7 Yurii Synytsia S
- 8 Dmytro Yanchuk OH
- 10 Yurii Semeniuk MB
- 12 Serhii Yevstratov S
- 13 Vasyl Tupchii OP
- 14 Illia Kovalov OH
- 15 Vitalii Shchytkov S
- 16 Dmytro Dolgopolov S
- 17 Oleksandr Boiko L
- 18 Tymofii Poluian OH
- 19 Mykola Kuts MB
- 20 Oleksandr Nalozhnyi OH
- 21 Yevhenii Kisiliuk OH
- 24 Yaroslav Pampushko L
- 25 Volodymyr Tevkun OP
- 30 Andrii Chelenyak L
- 33 Valerii Todua MB
- 35 Ruslan Chervatiuk MB
- 42 Danylo Uryvkin OP
- 88 Oleksandr Koval MB
- 97 Mykyta Luban OP

== United States ==
The following was the United States' roster at the 2026 Men's Volleyball Nations League.

Head coach: (United States) Karch Kiraly

- 1 Camden Gianni OH
- 2 Kaleb Jenness OH
- 3 Mason Briggs L
- 4 Jeffrey Jendryk MB
- 5 Kyle Ensing OP
- 6 Quinn Isaacson S
- 7 Jacob Pasteur OH
- 8 Kevin Kobrine OP
- 9 Gabriel Garcia OP
- 12 Shane Holdaway MB
- 14 Micah Maʻa S
- 15 Kyle Hobus OP
- 16 Jacob Reilly L
- 17 Andrew Rowan S
- 18 Cooper Robinson OH
- 19 Patrick Gasman MB
- 20 Cameron Thorne MB
- 21 Zachary Rama OH
- 22 Erik Shoji L
- 23 Nolan Flexen OH
- 24 Merrick McHenry MB
- 25 Ethan Champlin OH
- 26 Matthew Knigge MB
- 27 Michael Marshman MB
- 28 Tread Rosenthal S
- 29 Jordan Ewert OH
- 30 Daniel Wetter MB
- 31 Michael Wright S
- 32 Parker Tomkinson MB

== See also ==
- 2026 FIVB Women's Volleyball Nations League squads
