= 2025 FIVB Men's Volleyball World Championship squads =

This article shows the 14-player roster of all participating teams at the 2025 FIVB Men's Volleyball World Championship.

Each national team had to register a long-list roster with up to 25 players, which eventually had to be reduced to a final list of 14 players.

== Pool A ==
=== Egypt ===
The following is Egypt's roster for the 2025 FIVB Men's Volleyball World Championship.

Head coach: (Italy) Marco Bonitta

- 1 Mohamed Osman Elhaddad MB
- 4 Zyad Mohamed Osama OP
- 5 Abdelrahman Seoudy MB
- 6 Mohamed Hassan L
- 7 Mohamed Noureldin Ramadan L
- 8 Abdelrahman Elhossiny Eissa OH
- 9 Mohamed Sayedin Asran OH
- 11 Yassin Eid Mohamed S
- 14 Seifeldin Hassan Aly OP
- 18 Ahmed Shafik OH
- 19 Ahmed Omar OH
- 22 Ahmed Azab Abdelrahman OH
- 23 Ashraf Ellakany S
- 24 Abdelrahman Mohammed Elshahat MB

=== Iran ===
The following is Iran's roster for the 2025 FIVB Men's Volleyball World Championship.

Head coach: (Italy) Roberto Piazza

- 6 Bardia Saadat OP
- 7 Ehsan Daneshdoust OH
- 8 Mohammad Reza Hazratpour L
- 9 Poriya Hossein Khanzadeh OH
- 12 Amirhossein Esfandiar OH
- 13 Ali Ramezani S
- 15 Arshia Behnezhad S
- 17 Ali Hajipour OP
- 20 Yousef Kazemi MB
- 21 Arman Salehi L
- 22 Ali Haghparast OH
- 27 Mohammad Valizadeh MB
- 49 Morteza Sharifi OH
- 66 Seyed Eisa Naseri MB

=== Philippines ===
The following is the Philippines's roster for the 2025 FIVB Men's Volleyball World Championship.

Head coach: (Italy) Angiolino Frigoni

- 1 Bryan Bagunas OH
- 2 Josh Ybañez L
- 3 Joshua Retamar S
- 4 Vince Lorenzo OH
- 7 Kim Malabunga MB
- 13 Jack Kalingking L
- 15 Marck Espejo OH
- 16 Peng Taguibolos MB
- 17 Leo Ordiales OP
- 19 Eco Adajar S
- 20 Lloyd Josafat MB
- 21 Louie Ramirez OP
- 22 Michaelo Buddin OH
- 24 Jade Alex Disquitado OH

=== Tunisia ===
The following is Tunisia's roster for the 2025 FIVB Men's Volleyball World Championship.

Head coach: (Italy) Camillo Placi

- 1 Ahmed Salem Boussabah MB
- 2 Ahmed Kadhi MB
- 3 Khaled Ben Slimene S
- 7 Elyes Karamosli OH
- 8 Achref Bouaziz OH
- 9 Hamza Hfaiedh OH
- 11 Walid Mokhtar Baccour S
- 12 Mohamed Ridene L
- 13 Selim Mbareki MB
- 14 Oussama Ben Romdhane OH
- 15 Elyes Bouachir OH
- 17 Mahdi Ben Tahar MB
- 18 Ali Bongui OP
- 19 Taieb Korbosli L

== Pool B ==
=== Netherlands ===
The following is the Netherlands's roster for the 2025 FIVB Men's Volleyball World Championship.

Head coach: (United Kingdom) Joel Banks

- 1 Siebe Korenblek MB
- 2 Wessel Keemink S
- 3 Michiel Ahyi OP
- 5 Luuc van der Ent MB
- 6 Sil Meijs OP
- 7 Gijs Jorna L
- 8 Fabian Plak MB
- 9 Joris Berkhout S
- 10 Tom Koops OH
- 11 Jeffrey Klok L
- 12 Bennie Tuinstra OH
- 18 Jasper Wijkstra OH
- 20 Yannick Bak OH
- 22 Twan Wiltenburg MB

=== Poland ===
The following is Poland's roster for the 2025 FIVB Men's Volleyball World Championship.

Head coach: (Serbia) Nikola Grbić

- 3 Jakub Popiwczak L
- 4 Marcin Komenda S
- 6 Bartosz Kurek OP
- 9 Wilfredo León OH
- 12 Artur Szalpuk OH
- 15 Jakub Kochanowski MB
- 16 Kamil Semeniuk OH
- 18 Maksymilian Granieczny L
- 21 Tomasz Fornal OH
- 34 Szymon Jakubiszak MB
- 35 Kewin Sasak OP
- 73 Jakub Nowak MB
- 96 Jan Firlej S
- 99 Norbert Huber MB

=== Romania ===
The following is Romania's roster for the 2025 FIVB Men's Volleyball World Championship.

Head coach: (Romania) Sergiu Stancu

- 1 Bela Bartha MB
- 2 Mircea Peţa OH
- 3 Filip Constantin S
- 6 Claudiu Dumitru S
- 7 Rareş Bălean OH
- 9 Adrian Aciobăniței OH
- 10 Paul Tudor Magdas MB
- 11 Karol Kosinski L
- 12 Marian Bala OH
- 15 Andrei Butnaru MB
- 17 Vlad Kantor L
- 22 Ştefan Lupu MB
- 28 Alexandru Ionescu OP
- 99 Cristian-Daniel Chitigoi OH

=== Qatar ===
The following is Qatar's roster for the 2025 FIVB Men's Volleyball World Championship.

Head coach: (Argentina) Camilo Soto

- 1 Youssef Oughlaf OH
- 2 Papemaguette Diagne MB
- 3 Moubarak Alkuwari OH
- 4 Renan Ribeiro OH
- 5 Sulaiman Saad L
- 6 Borislav Georgiev S
- 7 Belal Nabel Abunabot MB
- 8 Waleed Widatalla OH
- 11 Nikola Vasić OH
- 16 Ibrahim Ibrahim MB
- 19 Naji Mahmoud L
- 20 Abdallah Ibrahim Nassim MB
- 22 Abdelrahman Ayman Bakry OP
- 24 Mahdi Badreddin Sammoud S

== Pool C ==
=== Argentina ===
The following is Argentina's roster for the 2025 FIVB Men's Volleyball World Championship.

Head coach: (Argentina) Marcelo Méndez

- 1 Matías Sánchez S
- 3 Jan Martínez Franchi OH
- 4 Joaquín Gallego MB
- 6 Germán Gómez OP
- 7 Luciano Palonsky OH
- 8 Agustín Loser MB
- 9 Santiago Danani L
- 11 Manuel Armoa OH
- 15 Luciano De Cecco S
- 16 Pablo Kukartsev OH
- 17 Luciano Vicentín OH
- 22 Nicolás Zerba MB
- 29 Ignacio Luengas OH
- 77 Matías Giraudo S

=== Finland ===
The following is Finland's roster for the 2025 FIVB Men's Volleyball World Championship.

Head coach: (Finland) Olli Kunnari

- 1 Antti Ronkainen OH
- 2 Eemi Tervaportti S
- 6 Petteri Tyynismaa MB
- 7 Niko Suihkonen OH
- 8 Voitto Köykkä L
- 10 Luka Marttila OH
- 11 Miika Haapaniemi MB
- 13 Joonas Mikael Jokela OP
- 17 Severi Savonsalmi MB
- 19 Niklas Aleksi Breilin L
- 21 Veikka Lindqvist OP
- 24 Nooa Marttila OH
- 25 Juho Kaunisto MB
- 33 Fedor Ivanov S

=== France ===
The following is France's roster for the 2025 FIVB Men's Volleyball World Championship.

Head coach: (Italy) Andrea Giani

- 1 Barthélémy Chinenyeze MB
- 2 Jenia Grebennikov L
- 4 Jean Patry OP
- 6 Benjamin Toniutti S
- 9 Earvin N'Gapeth OH
- 11 Antoine Brizard S
- 14 Nicolas Le Goff MB
- 15 Mathis Henno OH
- 17 Trévor Clévenot OH
- 19 Yacine Louati OH
- 20 Benjamin Diez L
- 21 Théo Faure OP
- 25 Quentin Jouffroy MB
- 30 François Huetz MB

=== South Korea ===
The following is South Korea's roster for the 2025 FIVB Men's Volleyball World Championship.

Head coach: (Brazil) Issanayê Ramires Ferraz

- 1 Cha Young-seok MB
- 2 Hwang Taek-eui S
- 3 Han Tae-jun S
- 4 Jang Ji-won L
- 5 Park Kyeong-min L
- 7 Heo Su-bong OH
- 9 Lim Sung-jin OH
- 10 Na Gyeong-bok OH
- 12 Park Chang-seong MB
- 16 Jeong Han-yong OH
- 17 Im Dong-hyeok OP
- 18 Choi Jun-hyeok MB
- 30 Shin Ho-jin OP
- 99 Kim Ji-han OH

== Pool D ==
=== Colombia ===
The following is Colombia's roster for the 2025 FIVB Men's Volleyball World Championship.

Head coach: (Italy) Paolo Montagnani

- 1 Ronald Jiménez OP
- 2 Marlon Mendoza OH
- 5 Roosvuelt Ramos L
- 6 Santiago Ruiz OH
- 7 Andrés Piza OH
- 8 Leandro Mejía MB
- 9 Jharold Caicedo L
- 10 Gustavo Larrahondo OP
- 11 Samuel Jaramillo S
- 12 Cristian Palacios MB
- 13 Juan Ambuila S
- 17 Miguel Ángel Martínez OP
- 20 Juan Felipe Castañeda OH
- 23 Daniel Aponza MB

=== Cuba ===
The following is Cuba's roster for the 2025 FIVB Men's Volleyball World Championship.

Head coach: (Cuba) Jesús Cruz

- 1 José Masso MB
- 2 Osniel Melgarejo OH
- 5 Javier Concepción MB
- 7 Yonder García L
- 8 Julio Gómez S
- 13 Robertlandy Simón MB
- 14 Yordan Bisset OP
- 15 Bryan Camino L
- 18 Miguel Ángel López OH
- 21 Roamy Alonso MB
- 22 José Miguel Gutiérrez OH
- 23 Marlon Yant OH
- 25 David Fiel MB
- 28 Christian Thondike S

=== Portugal ===
The following is Portugal's roster for the 2025 FIVB Men's Volleyball World Championship.

Head coach: (Portugal) João José

- 2 Kelton Tavares MB
- 3 Rafael Santos OH
- 4 Filip Cveticanin MB
- 6 Alexandre Ferreira OH
- 7 Ivo Casas L
- 8 Tiago Violas S
- 9 Nuno Marques OH
- 10 Gonçalo Sousa L
- 11 Bruno Dias S
- 12 Lourenço Martins OH
- 13 José Pinto OP
- 15 Miguel Tavares S
- 16 Guilherme Menezes MB
- 18 André Pereira OH

=== United States ===
The following is the United States' roster for the 2025 FIVB Men's Volleyball World Championship.

Head coach: (United States) Karch Kiraly

- 4 Jeffrey Jendryk MB
- 5 Kyle Ensing OP
- 7 Jacob Pasteur OH
- 9 Gabriel García OP
- 10 Kyle Dagostino L
- 11 Micah Christenson S
- 13 Taylor Averill MB
- 14 Micah Maʻa S
- 18 Cooper Robinson OH
- 22 Erik Shoji L
- 24 Merrick McHenry MB
- 25 Ethan Champlin OH
- 26 Matthew Knigge MB
- 29 Jordan Ewert OH

== Pool E ==
=== Bulgaria ===
The following is Bulgaria's roster for the 2025 FIVB Men's Volleyball World Championship.

Head coach: (Italy) Gianlorenzo Blengini

- 1 Simeon Nikolov S
- 3 Iliya Petkov MB
- 4 Martin Atanasov OH
- 5 Boris Nachev MB
- 8 Asparuh Asparuhov OH
- 11 Aleks Grozdanov MB
- 12 Georgi Tatarov OH
- 15 Rusi Zhelev OH
- 18 Venislav Antov OP
- 20 Stoil Palev S
- 21 Dimitar Dobrev L
- 22 Damyan Kolev L
- 23 Aleksandar Nikolov OH
- 29 Preslav Petkov MB

=== Chile ===
The following is Chile's roster for the 2025 FIVB Men's Volleyball World Championship.

Head coach: (Argentina) Daniel Nejamkin

- 2 Vicente Ibarra OH
- 3 Gabriel Araya MB
- 5 Vicente Parraguirre OP
- 6 Tomás Gago MB
- 8 Rafael Albornoz S
- 9 Dusan Bonacić OH
- 10 Vicente Mardones OP
- 11 Matías Jadue OH
- 12 Noe Aravena OH
- 15 Sebastián Castillo L
- 16 Vicente Valenzuela MB
- 17 Jaime Bravo L
- 18 Kaj Bonacić OH
- 19 Matías Banda S

=== Germany ===
The following is Germany's roster for the 2025 FIVB Men's Volleyball World Championship.

Head coach: (Poland) Michał Winiarski

- 2 Leonard Graven L
- 5 Moritz Reichert OH
- 8 Filip John OP
- 9 György Grozer OP
- 12 Anton Brehme MB
- 16 Tim Peter OH
- 17 Jan Zimmermann S
- 18 Florian Krage MB
- 19 Erik Röhrs OH
- 21 Tobias Krick MB
- 22 Tobias Brand OH
- 24 Eric Burggräf S
- 32 Theo Mohwinkel OH
- 33 Simon Valentin Torwie MB

=== Slovenia ===
The following is Slovenia's roster for the 2025 FIVB Men's Volleyball World Championship.

Head coach: (Italy) Fabio Soli

- 1 Tonček Štern OP
- 2 Alen Pajenk MB
- 4 Jan Kozamernik MB
- 7 Luka Marovt OH
- 8 Rok Bračko OH
- 10 Sašo Štalekar MB
- 12 Grega Okroglič L
- 13 Jani Kovačič L
- 14 Žiga Štern OH
- 16 Gregor Ropret S
- 17 Tine Urnaut OH
- 20 Nik Mujanović OP
- 22 Janž Janez Kržič MB
- 24 Nejc Najdič S

== Pool F ==
=== Algeria ===
The following is Algeria's roster for the 2025 FIVB Men's Volleyball World Championship.

Head coach: (Algeria) Kamel Imeloul

- 2 Sofiane Bouyoucef MB
- 4 Abderrahim Arab MB
- 5 Houssam Zerouka L
- 6 Yasser Amrat OH
- 7 Adil Kadri MB
- 8 Boudjemaa Ikken OP
- 9 Samir Chikhi MB
- 10 Youssouf Bourouba OP
- 11 Soufiane Hosni OH
- 12 Sidi Mohamed Dour OH
- 14 Ayyoub Dekkiche OH
- 15 Abi Ayad Mohamed Oualid L
- 18 Farouk Tizit OH
- 19 Abderaouf Hamimes S

=== Belgium ===
The following is Belgium's roster for the 2025 FIVB Men's Volleyball World Championship.

Head coach: (Italy) Emanuele Zanini

- 2 Ferre Reggers OP
- 3 Sam Deroo OH
- 4 Stijn D'Hulst S
- 5 Pieter Coolman MB
- 6 Simon Plaskie OH
- 9 Wout D'Heer MB
- 10 Mathijs Desmet OH
- 11 Seppe Van Hoyweghen S
- 12 Seppe Rotty OH
- 13 Kobe Verwimp L
- 15 Basil Dermaux OP
- 19 Gorik Lantsoght L
- 21 Samuel Fafchamps MB
- 23 Pierre Perin OH

=== Italy ===
The following is Italy's roster for the 2025 FIVB Men's Volleyball World Championship.

Head coach: (Italy) Ferdinando De Giorgi

- 5 Alessandro Michieletto OH
- 6 Simone Giannelli S
- 7 Fabio Balaso L
- 8 Riccardo Sbertoli S
- 9 Francesco Sani OH
- 11 Kamil Rychlicki OP
- 12 Mattia Bottolo OH
- 14 Gianluca Galassi MB
- 16 Yuri Romanò OP
- 17 Simone Anzani MB
- 19 Roberto Russo MB
- 25 Giovanni Gargiulo MB
- 28 Domenico Pace L
- 31 Luca Porro OH

=== Ukraine ===
The following is Ukraine's roster for the 2025 FIVB Men's Volleyball World Championship.

Head coach: (Argentina) Raúl Lozano

- 1 Maksym Drozd MB
- 7 Yurii Synytsia S
- 8 Dmytro Yanchuk OH
- 10 Yurii Semeniuk MB
- 13 Vasyl Tupchii OP
- 14 Illia Kovalov OH
- 15 Vitalii Shchytkov S
- 17 Oleksandr Boiko L
- 18 Tymofii Poluian OH
- 21 Yevhenii Kisiliuk OH
- 24 Yaroslav Pampushko L
- 33 Valerii Todua MB
- 42 Danylo Uryvkin OP
- 88 Oleksandr Koval MB

== Pool G ==
=== Canada ===
The following is Canada's roster for the 2025 FIVB Men's Volleyball World Championship.

Head coach: (Canada) Daniel Lewis

- 1 Daenan Gyimah MB
- 2 Luke Herr S
- 3 Jesse Elser OH
- 4 Nicholas Hoag OH
- 7 Jackson Howe MB
- 9 Max Elgert S
- 11 Xander Ketrzynski OP
- 13 Sharone Vernon-Evans OP
- 15 Jackson Young OH
- 16 Jordan Schnitzer MB
- 18 Justin Lui L
- 22 Isaac Heslinga OH
- 33 Fynn McCarthy MB
- 97 Landon Currie L

=== Libya ===
The following is Libya's roster for the 2025 FIVB Men's Volleyball World Championship.

Head coach: (Tunisia) Ghazi Koubba

- 1 Abdelrahman Abu Zariba S
- 2 Ali Jineefah MB
- 3 Ahmed Ikhbayri OP
- 4 Salah Adeen Abdelmalek L
- 6 Foad Elmaarug L
- 8 Soltan Elhoush MB
- 10 Adim Mohamed Mousa OH
- 11 Anas Alwaddani MB
- 13 Mustafa Alashlam OH
- 14 Mohamed Ikhbayri OH
- 16 Ragab Tarek Zakka S
- 18 Mohamed Alghoul MB
- 20 Mohammed Alajeeli OH
- 22 Mohamed Garwash OH

=== Japan ===
The following is Japan's roster for the 2025 FIVB Men's Volleyball World Championship.

Head coach: (France) Laurent Tillie

- 2 Taishi Onodera MB
- 4 Kento Miyaura OP
- 5 Tatsunori Otsuka OH
- 9 Masaki Oya S
- 12 Ran Takahashi OH
- 13 Tomohiro Ogawa L
- 14 Yūki Ishikawa OH
- 15 Kai Masato OH
- 17 Keigo Nishimoto MB
- 18 Hiroto Nishiyama OP
- 20 Tomohiro Yamamoto L
- 21 Motoki Eiro S
- 23 Larry Evbade-Dan MB
- 32 Shunichiro Sato MB

=== Turkey ===
The following is Turkey's roster for the 2025 FIVB Men's Volleyball World Championship.

Head coach: (Serbia) Slobodan Kovač

- 3 Ahmet Tümer MB
- 5 Mert Matić MB
- 7 Bedirhan Bülbül MB
- 9 Ramazan Efe Mandıracı OH
- 11 Mirza Lagumdžija OH
- 12 Adis Lagumdžija OP
- 14 Gökçen Yüksel OH
- 16 Beytullah Hatipoğlu L
- 17 Murat Yenipazar S
- 19 Berkay Bayraktar L
- 23 Muhammed Kaya S
- 55 Cafer Kirkit OH
- 59 Can Koç OP
- 77 Yiğit Savaş Kaplan MB

== Pool H ==
=== Brazil ===
The following is Brazil's roster for the 2025 FIVB Men's Volleyball World Championship.

Head coach: (Brazil) Bernardo Rezende

- 1 Alan Souza OP
- 5 Matheus Gonçalves S
- 6 Adriano Xavier OH
- 7 Matheus Santos MB
- 8 Henrique Honorato OH
- 11 Judson Cunha MB
- 14 Fernando Kreling S
- 15 Maique Nascimento L
- 18 Ricardo Lucarelli OH
- 19 Arthur Bento OH
- 20 Lukas Bergmann OH
- 23 Flávio Gualberto MB
- 25 Chizoba Atu OP
- 28 Darlan Souza OP

=== China ===
The following is China's roster for the 2025 FIVB Men's Volleyball World Championship.

Head coach: (Belgium) Vital Heynen

- 1 Wen Zihua OP
- 2 Jiang Chuan OP
- 3 Wang Hebin S
- 4 Li Lei OH
- 6 Yu Yuantai OH
- 7 Yu Yaochen S
- 9 Li Yongzhen MB
- 10 Ji Daoshuai OH
- 12 Zhang Zhejia MB
- 15 Peng Shikun MB
- 16 Qu Zongshuai L
- 23 Wang Bin OH
- 26 Li Tianyue L
- 31 Liu Libin OH

=== Czech Republic ===
The following is the Czech Republic's roster for the 2025 FIVB Men's Volleyball World Championship.

Head coach: (Czech Republic) Jiří Novák

- 3 Jan Galabov OH
- 4 Matouš Drahoňovský OH
- 5 Adam Zajíček MB
- 6 Milan Moník L
- 9 Luboš Bartůněk S
- 11 Lukáš Vašina OH
- 12 Martin Licek OH
- 16 Jiří Srb S
- 17 Marek Šotola OP
- 19 Michael Kovařík L
- 23 Patrik Indra OP
- 25 Josef Polák MB
- 39 Antonín Klimeš MB
- 95 Jiří Benda OH

=== Serbia ===
The following is Serbia's roster for the 2025 FIVB Men's Volleyball World Championship.

Head coach: (Romania) Gheorghe Crețu

- 1 Dušan Nikolić OP
- 3 Stefan Negić L
- 4 Veljko Mašulović OH
- 8 Marko Ivović OH
- 9 Nikola Jovović S
- 10 Miran Kujundžić OH
- 12 Pavle Perić OH
- 13 Vladimir Gajović MB
- 15 Nemanja Mašulović MB
- 16 Dražen Luburić OP
- 19 Aleksandar Stefanović MB
- 21 Vuk Todorović S
- 22 Nikola Brborić OH
- 29 Aleksandar Nedeljković MB

== See also ==
- 2025 FIVB Women's Volleyball World Championship squads
- 2025 FIVB Men's Volleyball Nations League squads
- 2025 FIVB Women's Volleyball Nations League squads
