= 2025 FIVB Volleyball Men's U21 World Championship squads =

This article shows the 12-player roster of all participating teams at the 2025 FIVB Volleyball Men's U21 World Championship.

== Pool A ==
=== China ===
A 12-player squad was announced on 19 August 2025.

Head coach: (Poland) Pawel Woicki

No.	Name	Pos.	Date of birth	Height	2025 club
1	Gao Yuning	MB	16 February 2005	2.03 m (6 ft 8 in)	(China) Jiangsu
2	Sun Qingsong	L	21 January 2006	1.79 m (5 ft 10 in)	(China) Jiangsu
3	Shi Taier	MB	23 January 2006	2.01 m (6 ft 7 in)	(China) Zhejiang
4	Wu Haoze	OH	21 April 2006	1.98 m (6 ft 6 in)	(China) Jiangsu
6	Li Hai	OP	17 November 2005	2.01 m (6 ft 7 in)	(China) Shandong
9	Zeng Yangjie	OH	31 October 2005	1.85 m (6 ft 1 in)	
11	Geng Qi	S	9 May 2005	1.88 m (6 ft 2 in)	(China) Jiangsu
12	Lyu Junpeng	MB	2 January 2006	2.00 m (6 ft 7 in)	(China) Shandong
14	Zhang Zhiqiang	OH	15 February 2006	1.97 m (6 ft 6 in)	(China) Shandong
15	Wang Bohan	OH	20 August 2006	1.95 m (6 ft 5 in)	
16	Yao Qian	S	1 November 2006	1.95 m (6 ft 5 in)	(China) Shandong
21	Li Duo	OH	3 May 2005	1.96 m (6 ft 5 in)	(China) Jiangsu

=== Egypt ===
A 12-player squad was announced on 19 August 2025.

Head coach: (Egypt) Ahmed Samir Eldardiri

No.	Name	Pos.	Date of birth	Height	2025 club
2	Salah Ibrahim	OP	26 September 2005	1.96 m (6 ft 5 in)	
3	Youssef Elrassas	MB	5 April 2006	2.06 m (6 ft 9 in)	(Egypt) Petrojet SC
4	Mahmoud Abdelbaki	OH	14 December 2005	1.93 m (6 ft 4 in)	
5	Hazem Abdelhady	L	17 May 2006	1.83 m (6 ft 0 in)	
7	Yassin Hassan	S	24 August 2005	1.90 m (6 ft 3 in)	
8	Ahmed Reda Mohamed	OP	11 October 2006	1.96 m (6 ft 5 in)	
9	Ahmed Abo Gabal	OP	5 June 2008	1.99 m (6 ft 6 in)	
10	Mazen Abdelhameed	S	5 December 2006	1.96 m (6 ft 5 in)	
11	Malek Elkhafif	OH	13 April 2006	1.80 m (5 ft 11 in)	
15	Ibrahim Abdelmaksood	MB	30 January 2006	2.06 m (6 ft 9 in)	
21	Hamza Elsafy Awad	OH	17 September 2005	1.97 m (6 ft 6 in)	(United Arab Emirates) Shabab Al-Ahli
25	Asser Masoud	OH	8 March 2005	1.94 m (6 ft 4 in)	(Egypt) Wadi Degla SC

=== United States ===
A 12-player squad was announced on 19 August 2025.

Head coach: (United States) John Hawks IV

No.	Name	Pos.	Date of birth	Height	2025 club
1	Kellen Larson	L	4 May 2005	1.75 m (5 ft 9 in)	(United States) Long Beach State
3	Cole Hartke	OP	20 April 2006	2.11 m (6 ft 11 in)	(United States) Pepperdine University
7	Trent Taliaferro	S	23 September 2005	1.96 m (6 ft 5 in)	(United States) UCLA Bruins
9	Trevell Jordan	MB	15 August 2006	2.08 m (6 ft 10 in)	(United States) Hawaii Rainbow Warriors
12	Sterling Foley	OH	15 December 2005	2.01 m (6 ft 7 in)	(United States) USC Trojans
13	Sean Kelly	OH	17 August 2005	2.01 m (6 ft 7 in)	(United States) UCLA Bruins
16	Tread Rosenthal	S	3 July 2006	2.08 m (6 ft 10 in)	(United States) Hawaii Rainbow Warriors
17	Riggs Guy	OH	4 August 2005	1.91 m (6 ft 3 in)	(United States) UC Santa Barbara Gauchos
18	Kyler Wade	OP	26 June 2006	2.08 m (6 ft 10 in)	
21	Jackson Cryst	MB	7 December 2006	2.08 m (6 ft 10 in)	
22	Sebastiano Sani	OH	10 October 2005	2.03 m (6 ft 8 in)	(United States) UC San Diego Tritons
23	Micah Goss	MB	25 November 2005	1.98 m (6 ft 6 in)	(United States) UC Irvine

=== Thailand ===
A 12-player squad was announced on 19 August 2025.

Head coach: (Thailand) Monchai Supajirakul

No.	Name	Pos.	Date of birth	Height	2025 club
1	Nakharin Inthanu	L	1 January 2006	1.77 m (5 ft 10 in)	(Thailand) Phitsanulok
3	Kittipong Sangsak	OH	27 February 2005	1.85 m (6 ft 1 in)	(Thailand) Plookpanya
6	Kittinan Phonphikun	MB	26 October 2006	1.90 m (6 ft 3 in)	(Thailand) Kohkood Cabana
7	Tanabodee Ponsena	S	12 March 2005	1.90 m (6 ft 3 in)	(Thailand) PSNKK
10	Seksan Chanya	MB	21 July 2006	1.97 m (6 ft 6 in)	(Thailand) Phitsanulok
11	Christopher Arli Upakam	OP	4 December 2006	2.06 m (6 ft 9 in)	(Thailand) Plookpanya
12	Ananda Klinhom	OP	26 May 2006	1.93 m (6 ft 4 in)	(Thailand) Kohkood Cabana
13	Kritsadikon Bunsuk	S	22 June 2005	1.80 m (5 ft 11 in)	(Thailand) Phitsanulok
16	Sathitpong Pingta	OP	5 August 2005	1.91 m (6 ft 3 in)	(Thailand) Muangphon VC
19	Krit Mueangsawai	OH	21 May 2006	1.74 m (5 ft 9 in)	(Thailand) Plookpanya
20	Kiadtiphum Ramsin	MB	15 June 2006	1.96 m (6 ft 5 in)	(Thailand) Kohkood Cabana
23	Kittipong Chaicharoen	OH	27 October 2006	1.91 m (6 ft 3 in)	(Thailand) Kohkood Cabana

=== Morocco ===
A 12-player squad was announced on 19 August 2025.

Head coach: (Morocco) Ismail Moujoud

No.	Name	Pos.	Date of birth	Height	2025 club
1	Anas El Moufakkir	OP	12 September 2005	1.97 m (6 ft 6 in)	
3	Taha Souikane	OH	20 March 2005	1.96 m (6 ft 5 in)	(Morocco) AS Salé
4	Miftah Abdelhakim	L	7 May 2005	1.78 m (5 ft 10 in)	
5	Abana Zakariae	MB	1 September 2005	1.99 m (6 ft 6 in)	
6	Walid El Haddar	MB	2 June 2005	1.98 m (6 ft 6 in)	
7	Hossame El Bouinany	S	4 October 2007	1.92 m (6 ft 4 in)	
9	Zakaria Mabrouk	S	21 March 2006	1.85 m (6 ft 1 in)	
12	Khatibi Zakaria	OH	11 December 2006	1.94 m (6 ft 4 in)	
13	Hicham Masmoudi	OH	18 January 2006	1.95 m (6 ft 5 in)	
14	Adam Lahsini	OH	13 December 2008	1.90 m (6 ft 3 in)	(Morocco) FUS Rabat
15	Moutaouakil Said	OH	29 April 2007	1.87 m (6 ft 2 in)	(Morocco) FUS Rabat
18	Nyan Abderrahman	MB	21 February 2006	1.99 m (6 ft 6 in)	(Morocco) Kenitra AC

=== Turkey ===
A 12-player squad was announced on 19 August 2025.

Head coach: (Turkey) Serkan Oğuz

No.	Name	Pos.	Date of birth	Height	2025 club
3	Batu Akbaba	L	27 January 2005	1.88 m (6 ft 2 in)	(Turkey) İstanbul BBSK
4	Kerem Suel	OP	29 October 2006	1.98 m (6 ft 6 in)	(Turkey) İstanbul BBSK
7	Selim Yıldız	MB	11 March 2006	2.04 m (6 ft 8 in)	(Turkey) İstanbul BBSK
9	Yiğit Hamza Aslan	OH	28 May 2005	2.06 m (6 ft 9 in)	(Turkey) Halkbank Ankara
10	Özgür Benzer	S	1 February 2005	1.97 m (6 ft 6 in)	(Turkey) İstanbul BBSK
11	Muharrem Kurtuluş	MB	15 October 2005	2.00 m (6 ft 7 in)	(Turkey) Arkas Spor
15	Mert Cuci	MB	10 August 2005	2.10 m (6 ft 11 in)	(Turkey) Bursa B.B. SK
18	Doğukan Yaltirakli	S	18 August 2006	2.00 m (6 ft 7 in)	(Turkey) Spor Toto
21	Berat Batın Mergen	MB	16 January 2006	2.05 m (6 ft 9 in)	(Turkey) Alanya Belediyespor
23	Aleksey Atilla Öztire	OP	16 July 2006	1.95 m (6 ft 5 in)	(Turkey) Arkas Spor
65	Recep Çınar Yağlı	OH	24 October 2007	1.90 m (6 ft 3 in)	(Turkey) TVF Spor Lisesi
95	Yılmaz Üner	OP	27 April 2005	1.92 m (6 ft 4 in)	(Turkey) Fenerbahçe

== Pool B ==
=== Iran ===
A 12-player squad was announced on 19 August 2025.

Head coach: (Iran) Gholamreza Momenimoghaddam

No.	Name	Pos.	Date of birth	Height	2025 club
1	Taha Behboudnia	MB	1 June 2005	2.09 m (6 ft 10 in)	(Iran) Sanatgaran Omid
2	Morteza Narimani	OH	2 March 2005	1.96 m (6 ft 5 in)	(Iran) Sanatgaran Omid
3	Emran Kook Jili	S	23 October 2005	1.87 m (6 ft 2 in)	(Iran) Pas Gorgan
5	Mohammadmani AliKhani	OH	17 March 2005	1.99 m (6 ft 6 in)	(Iran) Paykan Tehran
6	Emad Kakavand	S	9 October 2005	1.91 m (6 ft 3 in)	
7	Shayan Mehrabi	MB	24 November 2005	2.04 m (6 ft 8 in)	(Iran) Shahdab Yazd
8	Seyed Morteza Tabatabaei	L	28 October 2005	1.88 m (6 ft 2 in)	(Iran) Pas Gorgan
10	Pouya Ariakhah	OP	11 September 2006	2.05 m (6 ft 9 in)	(Iran) Sanatgaran Omid
11	Ali Mombeni	OP	1 August 2005	1.98 m (6 ft 6 in)	
12	Seyed Matin Hosseini	OH	26 September 2005	1.97 m (6 ft 6 in)	(Iran) Paykan Tehran
17	Ariyan Mahmoudi Nejad	OH	27 December 2005	1.95 m (6 ft 5 in)	(Iran) Shahrdari Urmia VC
20	Armin Ghelichniazi	MB	20 January 2005	2.01 m (6 ft 7 in)	(Iran) ChadorMalu Ardakan

=== Poland ===
A 12-player squad was announced on 19 August 2025.

Head coach: (Poland) Piotr Graban

No.	Name	Pos.	Date of birth	Height	2025 club
1	Stanislaw Chacinski	OH	14 February 2005	2.02 m (6 ft 8 in)	(United States) Ohio State Buckeyes
4	Błażej Bień	S	3 November 2005	1.89 m (6 ft 2 in)	(Poland) BKS Visła Proline Bydgoszcz
5	Jakub Kiedos	OH	23 November 2006	2.07 m (6 ft 9 in)	(Poland) KS Norwid Częstochowa
7	Jakub Jurczyk	L	17 February 2006	1.83 m (6 ft 0 in)	(Poland) Jastrzębski Węgiel
9	Wiktor Przybylek	MB	16 January 2005	2.00 m (6 ft 7 in)	(Poland) KS Lechia Tomaszów Mazowiecki
12	Bartłomiej Potrykus	OH	5 January 2005	1.94 m (6 ft 4 in)	(Poland) MKST Astra Nowa Sól
15	Artur Becker	S	30 December 2005	2.05 m (6 ft 9 in)	(Poland) MKST Astra Nowa Sól
17	Kamil Urbańczyk	MB	8 February 2005	2.04 m (6 ft 8 in)	(Poland) CUK Anioły Toruń
21	Michał Grzyb	OH	1 January 2005	1.99 m (6 ft 6 in)	(Czech Republic) VK Ostrava
22	Igor Rybak	OP	9 March 2005	1.96 m (6 ft 5 in)	(Poland) MKST Astra Nowa Sól
23	Aleksander Maciejewski	MB	14 November 2006	1.98 m (6 ft 6 in)	(Poland) MKST Astra Nowa Sól
24	Wojciech Gajek	OP	17 March 2006	2.00 m (6 ft 7 in)	(United States) Long Beach State

=== Canada ===
A 12-player squad was announced on 19 August 2025.

Head coach: (Canada) Chris Voth

No.	Name	Pos.	Date of birth	Height	2025 club
2	Quintin Greenidge	L	2 May 2005	1.72 m (5 ft 8 in)	(United States) Hawaii Rainbow Warriors
3	Zachary Yewchuk	MB	4 March 2005	2.00 m (6 ft 7 in)	(Canada) Trinity Western Spartans
4	Grant Hill	S	24 February 2005	1.96 m (6 ft 5 in)	(Canada) Mount Royal University
5	Dawson Pratt	OH	25 September 2005	1.92 m (6 ft 4 in)	(Canada) UBC Thunderbirds
7	Andon Kiriakou	OH	4 August 2005	1.84 m (6 ft 0 in)	(United States) UC Irvine
10	Luke Lodewyks	OP	5 September 2005	1.94 m (6 ft 4 in)	(Canada) Winnipeg Wesmen
17	Owen Harris	MB	6 January 2006	2.05 m (6 ft 9 in)	(Canada) Alberta Golden Bears and Pandas
19	Alexander Brdarevic	MB	29 July 2005	1.99 m (6 ft 6 in)	
21	Félix-Antoine Perron	OH	3 June 2006	1.95 m (6 ft 5 in)	
23	Owen Weekes	OP	23 July 2006	1.99 m (6 ft 6 in)	(Canada) University of Manitoba
31	Daniil Hershtynovich	OP	21 March 2005	2.06 m (6 ft 9 in)	(United States) Long Beach State
88	Willem Van Huizen	S	14 July 2006	1.89 m (6 ft 2 in)	(Canada) Trinity Western Spartans

=== South Korea ===
A 12-player squad was announced on 19 August 2025.

Head coach: (South Korea) Suk Jin-wook

No.	Name	Pos.	Date of birth	Height	2025 club
1	Lee Woo-jin	OH	16 May 2005	1.94 m (6 ft 4 in)	(South Korea) Korea Volleyball Association
2	Kim Dae-hwan	S	20 May 2005	1.90 m (6 ft 3 in)	(South Korea) Sungkyunkwan University
3	Yoon Seo-jin	OH	24 April 2005	1.95 m (6 ft 5 in)	(South Korea) Uijeongbu KB Insurance Stars
4	Youn Geon-woo	L	31 August 2005	1.77 m (5 ft 10 in)	(South Korea) Chosun University
7	Yoon Ha-jun	OH	25 March 2006	1.92 m (6 ft 4 in)	(South Korea) Suwon KEPCO Vixtorm
8	Cho Deuk-jin	OP	13 March 2007	1.92 m (6 ft 4 in)	(South Korea) Hyunil High School
10	Yun Gyeong	OH	30 August 2006	1.92 m (6 ft 4 in)	(South Korea) Inha University
11	Lim In-gyu	MB	17 May 2006	1.94 m (6 ft 4 in)	(South Korea) Inha University
15	Kim Gwan-woo	S	20 August 2006	1.95 m (6 ft 5 in)	(South Korea) Incheon Korean Air Jumbos
16	Jang Eun-seok	MB	12 July 2006	2.02 m (6 ft 8 in)	(South Korea) Hanyang University
17	Park Woo-young	OH	23 June 2005	1.87 m (6 ft 2 in)	(South Korea) Hanyang University
22	Cho Yeong-un	MB	7 January 2007	1.98 m (6 ft 6 in)	(South Korea) Namsung High School

=== Puerto Rico ===
A 12-player squad was announced on 19 August 2025.

Head coach: (Puerto Rico) Gerardo De Jesus Sanchez

No.	Name	Pos.	Date of birth	Height	2025 club
8	Diego Estrada Fernandez	S	20 January 2005	1.90 m (6 ft 3 in)	(United States) Lewis Flyers
11	Daniel Henwood Rodriguez	S	29 December 2005	1.83 m (6 ft 0 in)	(United States) Ohio State Buckeyes
18	Gustavo Alvarez Acosta	OH	26 February 2008	1.93 m (6 ft 4 in)	
19	Victor Torres Bernard	OH	20 May 2005	1.85 m (6 ft 1 in)	
21	Ramon Rosado Pineda	OP	11 February 2005	1.98 m (6 ft 6 in)	(France) Narbonne Volley
24	Diego Alvarez Cintron	OP	7 July 2006	1.93 m (6 ft 4 in)	
25	Eliel Salva Torres	MB	11 April 2005	1.97 m (6 ft 6 in)	(United States) Lincoln Memorial Railsplitters
26	Jean Gonzalez Vazquez	OH	24 January 2007	1.96 m (6 ft 5 in)	
28	Randy Delgado Nieves	L	25 August 2006	1.75 m (5 ft 9 in)	(United States) Fairleigh Dickinson Knights
31	Jose Gabriel Melendez Nieves	MB	20 January 2005	1.93 m (6 ft 4 in)	
44	Janluar Figueroa Torrens	MB	30 March 2006	1.96 m (6 ft 5 in)	(Spain) Rotogal Boiro

=== Kazakhstan ===
A 12-player squad was announced on 19 August 2025.

Head coach: (Kazakhstan) Sergey Trikoz

No.	Name	Pos.	Date of birth	Height	2025 club
1	Murojon Khavazmatov	L	27 October 2005	1.80 m (5 ft 11 in)	
2	Artyom Olexenko	MB	24 November 2006	2.08 m (6 ft 10 in)	
5	Zhanibek Omar	S	19 May 2006	1.90 m (6 ft 3 in)	(Kazakhstan) Zhetysu VC
6	Vladislav Mastikhin	OH	23 May 2007	1.95 m (6 ft 5 in)	
8	Bekzat Nurlybay	S	23 January 2005	1.88 m (6 ft 2 in)	(Kazakhstan) Zhetysu VC
9	Diyorbek Ikramov	OP	24 April 2005	1.91 m (6 ft 3 in)	
10	Islam Khajiyev	MB	6 July 2006	1.95 m (6 ft 5 in)	
12	Rassul Madiyarov	OH	16 March 2006	1.94 m (6 ft 4 in)	
14	Adil Suleimen	MB	10 August 2005	2.00 m (6 ft 7 in)	(Kazakhstan) FK Aktobe
18	Assylkhan Izbergenuly	OH	8 July 2005	2.03 m (6 ft 8 in)	(Kazakhstan) FK Aktobe
28	Adilzhan Baltabayev	MB	5 February 2005	2.02 m (6 ft 8 in)	(Kazakhstan) PAvlodar
52	Klim Ryukhov	OH	14 August 2005	2.09 m (6 ft 10 in)	(Kazakhstan) Burevestnik Almaty

== Pool C ==
=== Bulgaria ===
A 12-player squad was announced on 19 August 2025.

Head coach: (Bulgaria) Ventzislav Simeonov

No.	Name	Pos.	Date of birth	Height	2025 club
1	Georgi Bachvarov	OP	10 March 2005	2.03 m (6 ft 8 in)	(Bulgaria) Deya Volley
2	Rangel Vitekov	S	25 April 2005	1.85 m (6 ft 1 in)	(Bulgaria) Beroe 2016
3	Zhasmin Velichkov	OH	1 June 2007	2.03 m (6 ft 8 in)	(Italy) Vero Volley Monza
4	Alexander Tsanev	L	27 August 2005	1.88 m (6 ft 2 in)	
8	Stilian Delibosov	MB	19 February 2005	1.97 m (6 ft 6 in)	(United States) Cal State Northridge Matadors
11	Viktor Zhekov	S	24 April 2005	1.93 m (6 ft 4 in)	(Bulgaria) SKV Montana
12	Tomislav Rusev	MB	11 August 2005	2.07 m (6 ft 9 in)	(Bulgaria) Cherno More Bask
13	Aleksandar Kandev	OH	17 February 2005	2.00 m (6 ft 7 in)	(United States) Long Beach State
14	Nikolay Ivanov	OH	14 April 2006	1.90 m (6 ft 3 in)	(Italy) Campi Reali Cantu
17	Kristiyan Andreev	OP	23 April 2005	1.90 m (6 ft 3 in)	(Bulgaria) VC CSKA Sofia
18	Ognyan Hristov	OH	24 February 2006	1.97 m (6 ft 6 in)	(Bulgaria) Dunav Ruse
22	Nikolay Nikolaev	MB	2 May 2007	2.00 m (6 ft 7 in)	(Bulgaria) Levski Sofia

=== Brazil ===
A 12-player squad was announced on 19 August 2025.

Head coach: (Brazil) Anderson Rodrigues

No.	Name	Pos.	Date of birth	Height	2025 club
1	João Pedro Centola	L	29 August 2005	1.86 m (6 ft 1 in)	(Brazil) Sada Cruzeiro
2	João Victor Scalcon	S	16 March 2007	1.96 m (6 ft 5 in)	(Brazil) Sesi Bauru
3	Bruno Figueiredo	S	6 July 2005	1.90 m (6 ft 3 in)	(United States) NJIT Highlanders
4	Henrique Guedes	MB	9 May 2005	1.99 m (6 ft 6 in)	(Brazil) Minas Tênis Clube
5	Bryan Silva	OP	1 November 2005	2.04 m (6 ft 8 in)	(Brazil) Minas Tênis Clube
6	Vinicius Miranda	OH	27 April 2005	1.98 m (6 ft 6 in)	(Brazil) JF Volei
9	Felipe Parra	OH	19 April 2005	2.01 m (6 ft 7 in)	(Brazil) Sada Cruzeiro
10	João Pedro Avila	OH	13 April 2006	1.83 m (6 ft 0 in)	(United States) Cal State Northridge Matadors
11	Yan Patrick Santana	MB	27 June 2005	2.12 m (6 ft 11 in)	(Brazil) Itapema Volei
12	Bernardo Santos	MB	19 June 2005	1.95 m (6 ft 5 in)	(Brazil) Mogi Volei
16	Thiago Vaccari	OH	6 September 2005	1.95 m (6 ft 5 in)	(Brazil) Saneago Golas Volei
18	Martos Antonio Neto	OH	12 April 2005	2.10 m (6 ft 11 in)	(France) GFC Ajaccio Volleyball

=== Czech Republic ===
A 12-player squad was announced on 19 August 2025.

Head coach: (Czech Republic) Michal Nekola

No.	Name	Pos.	Date of birth	Height	2025 club
1	Ales Tlaskal	L	20 February 2006	1.70 m (5 ft 7 in)	(Czech Republic) VK Lvi Praha
2	Daniel Waclaw	OH	28 December 2005	1.76 m (5 ft 9 in)	(Czech Republic) Volejbal Brno
4	Adam Vitamvas	S	8 July 2005	1.93 m (6 ft 4 in)	(Czech Republic) VK TROX Pribram
5	Matyas Chromec	S	21 February 2005	1.86 m (6 ft 1 in)	(Czech Republic) VK CEZ Karlovarsko
6	Nicolas Hermansky	OH	17 September 2008	1.93 m (6 ft 4 in)	(Czech Republic) VK Lvi Praha
8	Stepan Svoboda	MB	17 May 2006	1.98 m (6 ft 6 in)	(Czech Republic) Ducla Liberec
9	Lukas Toth	MB	8 June 2005	1.97 m (6 ft 6 in)	(Czech Republic) VK TROX Pribram
10	Vojtech Pitner	OH	19 January 2005	2.00 m (6 ft 7 in)	(Czech Republic) VK jihostroj české budějovice
14	Matej Pastrnak	OH	25 November 2005	1.99 m (6 ft 6 in)	(Czech Republic) VK CEZ Karlovarsko
15	Tomas Brichta	OP	10 January 2006	2.04 m (6 ft 8 in)	(Czech Republic) VK jihostroj české budějovice
16	Vaclav Seidl	OP	24 July 2006	2.03 m (6 ft 8 in)	(Czech Republic) VK CEZ Karlovarsko
18	Jan Cerny	MB	26 March 2005	2.12 m (6 ft 11 in)	(Czech Republic) VK Benátky nad Jizerou

=== Colombia ===
A 12-player squad was announced on 19 August 2025.

Head coach: (Colombia) Camilo Hernandez Atehortua

No.	Name	Pos.	Date of birth	Height	2025 club
1	Juan Restrepo Orozco	S	10 August 2006	1.90 m (6 ft 3 in)	
2	Isaac Restrepo Londoño	S	9 February 2007	1.86 m (6 ft 1 in)	
4	Bryan Ramos Quintero	MB	9 October 2006	2.03 m (6 ft 8 in)	
6	Juan Velasco	MB	20 June 2005	2.07 m (6 ft 9 in)	(Brazil) Sada Cruzeiro
7	Santiago Gil Gonzalez	L	20 June 2005	1.81 m (5 ft 11 in)	
9	Heider Alonso Banguera	OH	22 August 2006	1.98 m (6 ft 6 in)	
10	Pablo Tello Herrera	OH	18 September 2005	1.88 m (6 ft 2 in)	(United States) Bethel University
11	Juan Diego Betancur	OH	18 May 2006	1.90 m (6 ft 3 in)	
13	Jose David Lujan Osorio	OH	18 February 2006	1.92 m (6 ft 4 in)	
15	Maicol Ortiz Castañeda	OP	8 October 2007	1.97 m (6 ft 6 in)	
16	Jeiner Rafael Campillo Mendoza	MB	16 November 2005	1.98 m (6 ft 6 in)	
19	Harry Andres Rivas Copete	MB	19 April 2005	1.98 m (6 ft 6 in)	(Brazil) Azulim/Monte Carmilo

=== Japan ===
A 12-player squad was announced on 19 August 2025.

Head coach: (Japan) Yoshitsugu Ueda

No.	Name	Pos.	Date of birth	Height	2025 club
1	Yuki Nakamura	S	13 March 2007	1.88 m (6 ft 2 in)	(Japan) Chuo University
2	Takuma Kawano	OH	25 July 2006	1.97 m (6 ft 6 in)	(Japan) Tokyo Great Bears
3	Kaishu Takematsu	S	31 December 2005	1.85 m (6 ft 1 in)	(Japan) Kokushikan University
4	Masaru Kanzaki	MB	5 August 2006	1.95 m (6 ft 5 in)	(Japan) Chuo University
5	Retsu Nakagami	OH	5 June 2006	1.90 m (6 ft 3 in)	(Japan) Waseda University
6	Kai Yamamoto	OP	6 July 2006	1.88 m (6 ft 2 in)	(Japan) Tsukuba University
7	Hyo Yamashita	MB	1 February 2005	1.97 m (6 ft 6 in)	(Japan) Tsukuba University
8	Taiki Shirono	OH	5 January 2006	1.88 m (6 ft 2 in)	(Japan) Juntendo University
9	Shunta Ono	OH	6 December 2005	1.85 m (6 ft 1 in)	(Japan) Waseda University
11	Yuzuki Akimoto	S	15 July 2005	1.91 m (6 ft 3 in)	(Japan) Chuo University
12	Taro Izaka	MB	27 September 2005	1.85 m (6 ft 1 in)	(Japan) Aichi Gakuin University
13	Etsushi Tanimoto	OH	2 November 2006	1.71 m (5 ft 7 in)	(Japan) Tsukuba University

=== Cuba ===
A 12-player squad was announced on 19 August 2025.

Head coach: (Cuba) Liancen Estrada Jova

No.	Name	Pos.	Date of birth	Height	2025 club
3	Jhonan Alvarez Torres	L	11 February 2005	1.83 m (6 ft 0 in)	(Cuba) Leopardos de Camagüey
4	Alessandro Gonzalez Fuentes	OH	23 August 2007	1.96 m (6 ft 5 in)	(Cuba) Avispas de Santiago
6	Yosdani Medina Torriente	OP	1 September 2008	1.92 m (6 ft 4 in)	(Cuba) Cienfuegos
8	Kelly Bryant Oviedo La O	OH	9 May 2005	1.93 m (6 ft 4 in)	(Cuba) Capitalinos de La Habana
10	Carlos Pereira Larrea	OH	6 March 2006	1.86 m (6 ft 1 in)	(Cuba) Avispas de Santiago
11	Jose Morejon Gomez	MB	2 November 2005	1.99 m (6 ft 6 in)	(Cuba) Capitalinos de La Habana
12	Dariel Sainz Guerra	S	15 August 2007	1.90 m (6 ft 3 in)	(Cuba) Capitalinos de La Habana
15	Rey Carbonell Gonzalez	MB	31 January 2005	2.00 m (6 ft 7 in)	(Cuba) Capitalinos de La Habana
17	Nathan Masso Mendoza	MB	6 December 2005	2.00 m (6 ft 7 in)	(Cuba) Guantanamo
18	Ronaldo Flaquet Barbon	S	30 January 2007	1.93 m (6 ft 4 in)	(Cuba) Tigres de Villa Clara
20	Felix Rodriguez Hernandez	OH	31 October 2005	2.06 m (6 ft 9 in)	(Cuba) Cienfuegos
30	Daniel Martinez Campos	OP	10 September 2005	2.15 m (7 ft 1 in)	(Japan) Hiroshima Thunders

== Pool D ==
=== Italy ===
A 12-player squad was announced on 19 August 2025.

Head coach: (Italy) Vincenzo Fanizza

No.	Name	Pos.	Date of birth	Height	2025 club
1	Gabriele Mariani	S	16 May 2005	1.90 m (6 ft 3 in)	(Italy) Sabaudia Volley
2	Diego Frascio	OP	22 July 2006	1.97 m (6 ft 6 in)	(Italy) Vero Volley Monza
3	Manuel Zlatanov	OH	7 March 2008	2.03 m (6 ft 8 in)	(Italy) Consar Ravenna
5	Lorenzo Magliano	OH	12 April 2005	1.97 m (6 ft 6 in)	(Italy) Alva Inox 2 Emme Service Porto Viro
10	Luca Loreti	L	24 December 2005	1.90 m (6 ft 3 in)	(Italy) Gas Sales Bluenergy Piacenza
11	Giacomo Selleri	S	30 September 2005	1.84 m (6 ft 0 in)	(Italy) Gabbiano FarmaMed Mantova
13	Tommaso Barotto	OP	24 August 2005	2.10 m (6 ft 11 in)	(Italy) Cisterna Volley
14	Andrea Giani	OH	29 May 2007	1.94 m (6 ft 4 in)	(Italy) UniTrento Volley
16	Marco Valbusa	MB	6 October 2005	2.00 m (6 ft 7 in)	(Italy) Rana Verona
18	Marco Fedrici	OH	18 August 2006	1.98 m (6 ft 6 in)	(Italy) Personal Time San Donà di Piave
19	Gioele Adeola Taiwo	MB	12 May 2006	1.96 m (6 ft 5 in)	(Italy) Campi Reali Cantú
23	Pardo Mati	MB	7 August 2006	2.04 m (6 ft 8 in)	(Italy) Valsa Grup Modena

=== Argentina ===
A 12-player squad was announced on 19 August 2025.

Head coach: (Argentina) Sebastian Fernandez

No.	Name	Pos.	Date of birth	Height	2025 club
4	Iñaki Ramos	OP	4 May 2005	2.09 m (6 ft 10 in)	(Germany) Helios Grizzlys Giesen
5	Juan Bautista Sanchez Tomas	S	29 January 2005	1.88 m (6 ft 2 in)	(Argentina) Defensores de Banfield
6	Mateo Gomez Aracena	OH	15 June 2005	1.95 m (6 ft 5 in)	(Argentina) UVT Unión Vecinal de Trinidad
7	Lorenzo Giraudo Escurra	OH	16 August 2005	1.94 m (6 ft 4 in)	(Argentina) Regatas Corrientes
8	Lucas Astegiano	S	23 March 2006	1.96 m (6 ft 5 in)	(Argentina) Waiwen Voley Club
9	Fausto Lopez	MB	19 January 2006	1.98 m (6 ft 6 in)	(Argentina) River Plate
10	Fausto Diaz	OH	11 April 2006	1.93 m (6 ft 4 in)	(Spain) ConectaBalear CV Manacor
12	Emiliano Molini	MB	19 May 2005	1.99 m (6 ft 6 in)	(Argentina) River Plate
13	Pedro Besso Riva	L	12 August 2005	1.82 m (6 ft 0 in)	
14	Agustin Moyano	OP	27 August 2006	2.05 m (6 ft 9 in)	(Argentina) Regatas Corrientes
15	Gino Bevilacqua	OH	9 December 2006	1.98 m (6 ft 6 in)	(Italy) Pallavolo Cascia
18	Leonardo Herbsommer	MB	16 May 2006	1.97 m (6 ft 6 in)	(Argentina) Waiwen Voley Club

=== Tunisia ===
A 12-player squad was announced on 19 August 2025.

Head coach: (Tunisia) Tarek Ouni

No.	Name	Pos.	Date of birth	Height	2025 club
1	Wajih Moalla	OP	15 March 2006	2.07 m (6 ft 9 in)	
2	Abdkarim Frikha	MB	10 May 2006	2.06 m (6 ft 9 in)	
4	Mohamed Aziz Ben Houria	OH	6 March 2005	1.90 m (6 ft 3 in)	
5	Youssef Chaari	L	9 November 2006	1.89 m (6 ft 2 in)	
6	Adem Ben Messaoud	OH	5 August 2005	1.89 m (6 ft 2 in)	
7	Mohamed Amine Jenzi	OP	26 January 2005	2.07 m (6 ft 9 in)	(Tunisia) CS Sfaxien
8	Mohamed Omar Bellalouna	S	22 May 2006	1.94 m (6 ft 4 in)	(Tunisia) AS La Marsa
9	Fedi Klouj	OH	6 July 2006	1.86 m (6 ft 1 in)	
10	Rasem Ksouda	OH	10 July 2005	1.87 m (6 ft 2 in)	
11	Fedi Ben Slimane	S	26 November 2006	1.86 m (6 ft 1 in)	
13	Mohamed Aziz Trabelsi	MB	14 November 2006	1.95 m (6 ft 5 in)	
14	Ayoub Messelmani	MB	14 March 2006	1.97 m (6 ft 6 in)	

=== France ===
A 12-player squad was announced on 19 August 2025.

Head coach: (France) Slimane Belmadi

No.	Name	Pos.	Date of birth	Height	2025 club
1	Joévin Wa-Bala	OH	15 December 2005	1.84 m (6 ft 0 in)	(France) Le Plessis-Robinson Volley-Ball CFC
3	Amir Tizi-Oualou	S	31 December 2005	1.97 m (6 ft 6 in)	(Italy) Valsa Grup Modena
6	Bastien Scherer	OH	20 January 2005	1.86 m (6 ft 1 in)	(France) Tours VB
7	Adrien Roure	OH	6 March 2006	1.96 m (6 ft 5 in)	(United States) Hawaii Rainbow Warriors
8	Thomas Pujol	OH	11 February 2005	1.98 m (6 ft 6 in)	(France) Stade Poitevin Poitiers
9	Enzo Lopez	L	25 August 2006	1.85 m (6 ft 1 in)	(France) Narbonne Volley
10	Andrej Jokanovic	OH	18 November 2007	2.00 m (6 ft 7 in)	(United States) UC Irvine
12	Jules Duthoit	MB	4 October 2005	2.00 m (6 ft 7 in)	(France) Spacer's Toulouse
14	Yann Laurencé	MB	5 January 2006	1.98 m (6 ft 6 in)	(France) Paris Volley
15	Arthur Kleynjans	S	15 September 2006	1.84 m (6 ft 0 in)	(France) PUC Volley-Ball
21	Daniel Iyegbekedo	MB	5 September 2007	2.05 m (6 ft 9 in)	(France) PUC Volley-Ball
22	Thomas Lapierre	OH	25 November 2005	1.92 m (6 ft 4 in)	(France) LISSP Calais

=== Ukraine ===
A 12-player squad was announced on 19 August 2025.

Head coach: (Ukraine) Sergii Kapelus

No.	Name	Pos.	Date of birth	Height	2025 club
1	Artem Karvatskyi	S	8 January 2005	1.90 m (6 ft 3 in)	(Ukraine) DSO-TNEU
4	Maksym Tonkonoh	OP	22 October 2007	2.14 m (7 ft 0 in)	(Italy) Virtus Vano
5	Maksym Svyrydov	OH	13 February 2007	1.92 m (6 ft 4 in)	(Ukraine) VC Epicentr-Podolyany
6	Mykola Kuts	MB	17 May 2006	2.08 m (6 ft 10 in)	(Ukraine) VC Barkom-Kazhany
7	Andriy Chelenyak	MB	2 January 2005	2.00 m (6 ft 7 in)	(Ukraine) VC Epicentr-Podolyany
9	Yaroslav Horobets	OH	20 January 2005	1.93 m (6 ft 4 in)	(Czech Republic) VK Ostrava
10	Denys Dehtiar	S	15 October 2005	1.87 m (6 ft 2 in)	(Ukraine) KZ KhPKSP KhOR
11	Eduard Shteryk	OH	3 June 2005	2.00 m (6 ft 7 in)	(Ukraine) VC Epicentr-Podolyany
12	Oleksandr Boiko	OP	1 March 2005	2.01 m (6 ft 7 in)	(Poland) AZS Olsztyn
15	Ruslan Chervatiuk	MB	23 May 2005	2.08 m (6 ft 10 in)	
17	Mykola Dzhul	L	4 March 2005	1.85 m (6 ft 1 in)	(Ukraine) VC Epicentr-Podolyany
19	Yevhenii Boiko	OH	28 February 2005	1.85 m (6 ft 1 in)	

=== Indonesia ===
A 12-player squad was announced on 19 August 2025.

Head coach: (China) Li Qiujiang

No.	Name	Pos.	Date of birth	Height	2025 club
3	Bagas Wijanarko	OH	29 March 2005	1.84 m (6 ft 0 in)	(Indonesia) Garuda Jaya
4	Darda Mulya Muhammad	MB	8 January 2005	1.90 m (6 ft 3 in)	(Indonesia) Garuda Jaya
5	Dawuda Alaihimassalam	OP	2 May 2005	1.96 m (6 ft 5 in)	(Indonesia) Garuda Jaya
7	Zaki Hasan Maulana	MB	24 March 2007	1.90 m (6 ft 3 in)	(Indonesia) Garuda Jaya
11	Hilarius Galang Bryantama	S	6 January 2006	1.85 m (6 ft 1 in)	(Indonesia) Garuda Jaya
12	Muhammad Reyhan	L	22 May 2007	1.82 m (6 ft 0 in)	(Indonesia) Garuda Jaya
13	Imam Ahmad Faisal	OP	14 May 2005	1.97 m (6 ft 6 in)	(Indonesia) Ganevo
14	Raihan Rizky Attorif	L	25 January 2006	1.73 m (5 ft 8 in)	(Indonesia) Garuda Jaya
15	Pajar Pamungkas	S	18 May 2005	1.80 m (5 ft 11 in)	(Indonesia) Garuda Jaya
16	Krisna	OH	8 June 2005	1.88 m (6 ft 2 in)	(Indonesia) Surabaya Samator
17	Muhammad Haikal Hidayatullah	OH	7 February 2007	1.90 m (6 ft 3 in)	(Indonesia) Garuda Jaya
18	Agustino	MB	26 August 2005	1.95 m (6 ft 5 in)	(Indonesia) Garuda Jaya
