= Emirhan Özçelik =

Turkish volleyball player (born 2006)

Personal information
- Full name: Emirhan Özçelik
- Born: 26 June 2006 (age 20) Turkey
- Height: 2.01 m (6 ft 7 in)
- Weight: 98 kg (216 lb)
- Spike: 345 cm (136 in)
- Block: 330 cm (130 in)

Volleyball information
- Position: Outside Hitter
- Current club: Galatasaray

Career
- Years: Team
- 2018–2022; 2022–2023; 2025–2026; 2026–: ES Voleybol; TVF Spor Lisesi; Galatasaray ll; Galatasaray

National team
- Years: Team
- –: Turkey

Emirhan Özçelik (born 26 June 2006) is a Turkish volleyball player who plays as an Outside Hitter.

== Club career ==
On August 13, 2026, he signed a one-year contract with Galatasaray.
