= Ghazi Koubba =

Tunisian volleyball player (born 1972)

Personal information
- Nationality: Tunisian
- Born: 28 October 1972 (age 52)

Sport
- Sport: Volleyball

Ghazi Koubba (born 28 October 1972) is a Tunisian volleyball player. He competed in the men's tournament at the 1996 Summer Olympics.
