= Emir Pınar =

Turkish volleyball player (born 2001)

Personal information
- Full name: Gülhan Emir Pınar
- Born: 20 August 2001 (age 25); Turkey
- Height: 1.97 m (6 ft 6 in)
- Weight: 93 kg (205 lb)
- Spike: 350 cm (138 in)
- Block: 340 cm (134 in)

Volleyball information
- Position: Middle-blocker
- Current club: Galatasaray
- Number: 31

Career
Years
- 2019–2021
- 2021–2022
- 2022–2026
- 2026–
Teams
- Altekma SK
- Milas Belediyespor
- Altekma SK
- Galatasaray

National team
Turkey

Gülhan Emir Pınar (born 20 August 2001) is a Turkish volleyball player who plays as a Middle-blocker.

== Club career ==
On July 22, 2026, he signed a two-year contract with Galatasaray.
