= Ramon Martinez Gion =

Dutch volleyball player (born 1990)

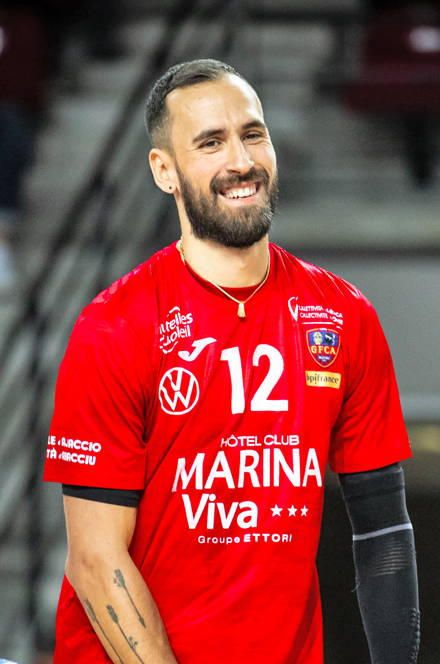

Personal information
- Full name: Ramon Renaldo Martinez Gion
- Nationality: Dutch
- Born: 12 September 1990 (age 36); Amsterdam, Netherlands
- Height: 1.97 m (6 ft 6 in)
- Weight: 85 kg (187 lb)
- Spike: 345 cm (136 in)
- Block: 325 cm (128 in)

Volleyball information
- Position: Outside hitter/Reception

Career
| Years | Teams |
|---|---|
| 2006–2009; 2009–2010; 2010–2014; 2014–2015; 2015–2016; 2016–2017; 2017–2018; 2018–2019; 2019–2020; 2020-2021; 2020-2021; 2020-2021; 2020–2021; 2021–2022; 2021–2022; 2022–2023; 2023–2024; 2024–2025 | (Netherlands) VC Omniworld (Netherlands) VVH (Netherlands) VC Allvo (Netherlands) Landstede Volleybal (Belgium) Prefaxis Menen (Germany) CV Mitteldeutschland (Turkey) Palandöken Belediyesi (Greece) PAOK Thessaloniki (France) Spacer's Toulouse (Germany) RTV Rottenburg (China) Shenzhen VB (United Arab Emirates) Al Ain SC (Greece) Iraklis V.C. (France) GFC Ajaccio (England) IBB London (France) Cambrai Volleyball (Netherlands) Draisma Dynamo (Netherlands) Nova Technology Lycurgus (Netherlands) Draisma Dynamo |

Ramon Renaldo Martinez Gion (born 12 September 1990, in Amsterdam) was a professional Dutch volleyball player, who stopped playing professionally after the season 2024–2025.

== Early life ==
He has played in the Netherlands, Belgium and German national competition, with some successes like winning the National Cup in the 2011–2012 season with Landstede Volleyball Netherlands A-League.

== Career ==
Ramon has played for VC Omniworld, VVH, VC Allvo, Landstede Volleyball, Prefaxis Menen and Chemie Volley Mitteldeutschland volleyball clubs. He started playing volleyball at age 12 after a lesson at school. Ramon worked his way up to the highest leagues through athletic and dynamic volleyball practice. During his time at the professional level with the Landstede Volleyball Club Ramon has won 2 national titles, 2 super cup titles, and 2 national cup titles. He was also voted as best player in season 2013/2014. Ramon is selected on the national long list of Holland existing out of 22 players.

=== National Prizes ===
- 2011/2012 Dutch National Cup, with Landstede Volleybal
- 2012/2013 Dutch Supercup, with Landstede Volleybal
- 2012/2013 Dutch Championship, with Landstede Volleybal
- 2013/2014 Dutch Supercup, with Landstede Volleybal
- 2013/2014 Dutch National Cup, with Landstede Volleybal
- 2013/2014 Dutch Championship, with Landstede Volleybal
- 2013/2014 Almelo International Tournament, with Landstede Volleybal
- 2013/2014 Team Of The Year, with Landstede Volleybal
- 2017/2018 Greek Super Cup, with P.A.O.K. Volley
- 2017/2018 Greek National Cup, with P.A.O.K. Volley
- 2017/2018 Greek National Championship, with P.A.O.K. Volley
- 2019/2020 German Cup, with RTV Rottenburg

=== Individual Prizes ===
- 1x Match MVP Bundesliga Germany
- 5x Match MVP Bundesliga Germany
- 2012/2013 Finals Top Scorer, with Landstede Volleybal
- 2013/2014 Player Of The Year, with Landstede Volleybal
- 2017/2018 P.A.O.K. Top scorer of the regular season

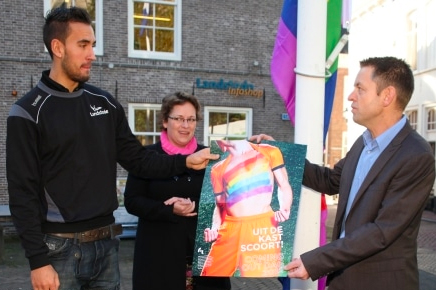
Ramon Martinez Gion at the national coming out day in Zwolle

== Personal life ==
At the beginning of Ramon's professional career he already stated his sexuality and did various interviews for Dutch media representing the LGBTQ community giving it a voice in the world of professional sports. On national coming out day (11 October 2012) Ramon helped by raising the rainbow flag over the city hall of Zwolle. While being the first openly homosexual volleyball player in The Netherlands he continued representing LGBTQ in his international career. Resulting in being the first openly gay professional athlete in Belgium France and Greece. Ramon was nominated for the OUT d’or in 2019 and to be ambassador of the 15th Paris International Sports Tournament hosted by FSGL.

== Sexual abuse allegations ==
In March 2026, Ramon was accused of sexually abusing underage boys and engaging in extensive online sexual contact with minors. Prosecutors alleged that he had sexually abused a 10-year-old boy, produced or arranged the production of child sexual abuse material, possessed large quantities of such material, and conducted hundreds of potentially criminal sexual chats with boys between the ages of 8 and 17. Investigators initially found around 500 potentially criminal conversations, including chats in which explicit images were exchanged. By May 2026, nearly 60 minors had been identified as potential victims. Ramon remained in pre-trial detention while the investigation continued.

== Sources ==
- Bundesliga Volleyball
- CV Mitteldeutschland
- Volley Menen
- Landstede Volleyball
- Volleybalkrant
