= Fatih Yörümez =

Turkish volleyball player (born 2000)

Personal information
- Full name: Fatih Yörümez
- Born: 11 March 2000 (age 26); Turkey
- Height: 1.83 m (6 ft 0 in)
- Weight: 78 kg (172 lb)
- Spike: 302 cm (119 in)
- Block: 292 cm (115 in)

Volleyball information
- Position: Libero
- Current club: Galatasaray

Career
Years
- 2018–2019
- 2019–2020
- 2020–2021
- 2021–2022
- 2022–2023
- 2023–2024
- 2024–2025
- 2025–2026
- 2026–
Teams
- Anadolu Üniversitesi Spor Kulübü
- TFL Altekma SK
- TÜRŞAD
- Solhan Spor
- Bursa Büyükşehir Belediyesi
- Hatay Büyükşehir Belediyespor
- ON Hotels Alanya Belediyespor
- İBB Spor Kulübü
- Galatasaray

National team
Turkey

Fatih Yörümez (born 11 March 2000) is a Turkish volleyball player who plays as a libero.

== Club career ==
On July 31, 2026, he signed a two-year contract with Galatasaray.
