= Matin Ahmadi =

Iranian volleyball player (born 2001)

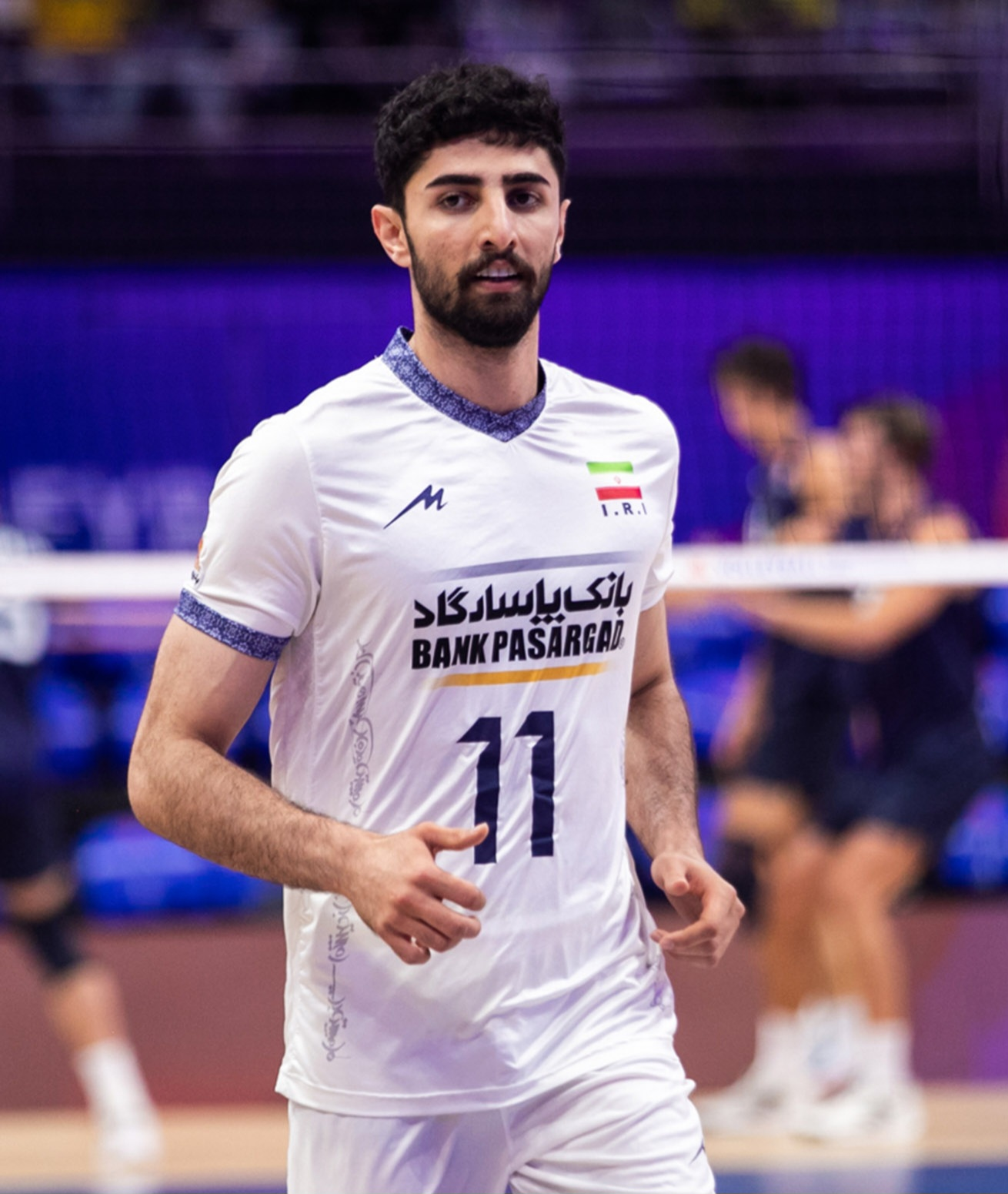
- Matin Ahmadi in 2025

Personal information
- Full name: Matin Ahmadi
- Nationality: Iranian
- Born: 15 May 2001 (age 25); Bukan, Iran
- Height: 2.01 m (6 ft 7 in)
- Weight: 74 kg (163 lb)
- Spike: 370 cm (146 in)
- Block: 360 cm (142 in)

Volleyball information
- Position: Middle blocker
- Current club: Chadormalu Ardakan
- Number: 11

Career
Years	Teams
2020–2021; 2021–2023; 2023–2024; 2024–2025; 2025–	(Iran) Shahrdari Urmia (Iran) Azar Battery Urmia (Iran) Pas Gorgan (Iran) Saipa Tehran (Iran) Chadormalu Ardakan

National team
2023–	Iran

Matin Ahmadi (Persian: متین احمدی, born May 15, 2001, in Bukan) is an Iranian volleyball player who plays as a Middle blocker for the Iranian national team and Iranian club Chadormalu Ardakan.
