= Amir Hossein Sadati =

Iranian volleyball player (born 2003)

Seyed Amirhossein Sadati
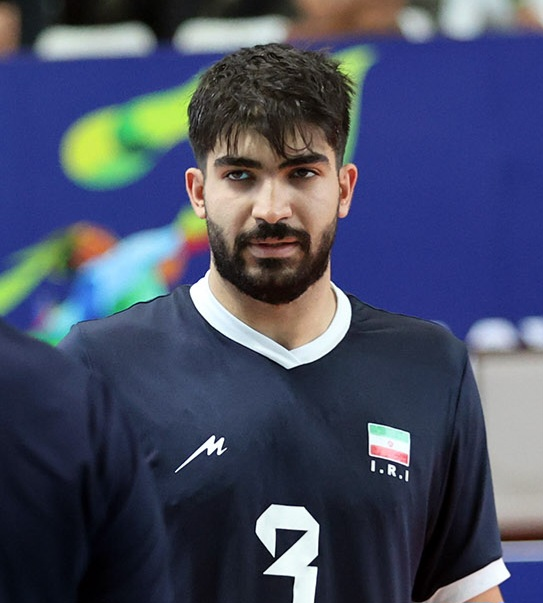
- Seyed Amirhossein Sadati in 2025

Personal information
- Full name: Seyed Amirhossein Sadati Baladehi
- Nationality: Iranian
- Born: 19 June 2003 (age 23); Sari, Iran
- Height: 1.93 m (6 ft 4 in)
- Weight: 95 kg (209 lb)
- Spike: 370 cm (146 in)
- Block: 350 cm (138 in)

Volleyball information
- Position: Outside Hitter
- Current club: Foolad Sirjan
- Number: 3

Career
Years	Teams
2022–2024; 2024–2025; 2025; 2025–	(Iran) Hoorsun Ramsar (Iran) Giti Pasand Isfahan (Iran) Paykan Tehran (Iran) Foolad Sirjan

National team
2023–	Iran

Seyed Amir Hossein Sadati Baladehi (Persian: سید امیرحسین ساداتی بالادهی, born June 19, 2003, in Sari) is an Iranian volleyball player who plays as an outside hitter for the Iranian national team and Iranian club Foolad Sirjan.
