= TVF Fine Arts and Sports High School =

- TVF Güzel Sanatlar ve Spor Lisesi

Location
- Emniyet Mah. Milas Sok. 9, C Teknikokullar, Beşevler; Yenimahalle; Ankara; Turkey
- Coordinates: 39°56′N 32°49′E

Information
- Type: Vocational school
- Opened: 2009-2010
- Founder: Turkish Volleyball Federation (TVF)
- Authority: Ministry of National Educational
- Gender: Coeducational
- Average class size: 30
- Sports: Volleyball

The TVF Fine Arts and Sports High School (Turkish: TVF Güzel Sanatlar ve Spor Lisesi) is a coeducational high school established in 2009 by the Turkish Volleyball Federation (TVF) in Yenimahalle district of Ankara, Turkey. The school's main purpose is to raise talented youth to sportspeople particularly in volleyball.

The education that lasts four years, began in the term 2009-2010 with 60 students enrolled in the 9th grade. The class capacity is limited to 30. For students living outside of Ankara, the school provides boarding facility for 26. Before the main campus building was completed in 2009-2010, the education took place temporarily in the Ankara Gazi Anadolu High School.

== Sport activities ==
Students distinguished in volleyball play in the school team while students, who perform other sports like football, basketball or athletics join clubs outside of the school.

Three players of the school volleyball team were admitted to the Turkey girls' youth national volleyball team, which became champions at the 2011 FIVB Girls Youth World Championship held from August 12 to 21 in Ankara.

The girls' volleyball team of the school won the bronze medal at its debuting international participation, the ISF World School's Championship Volleyball 2012 held between June 2–10 in Toulon, France, behind Spain and Brazil after defeating the team from Greece with 3-1 in the finals while the boys reached the 9th place at the same championship.
