= Yiğit Savaş Kaplan =

Turkish volleyball player (born 2004)

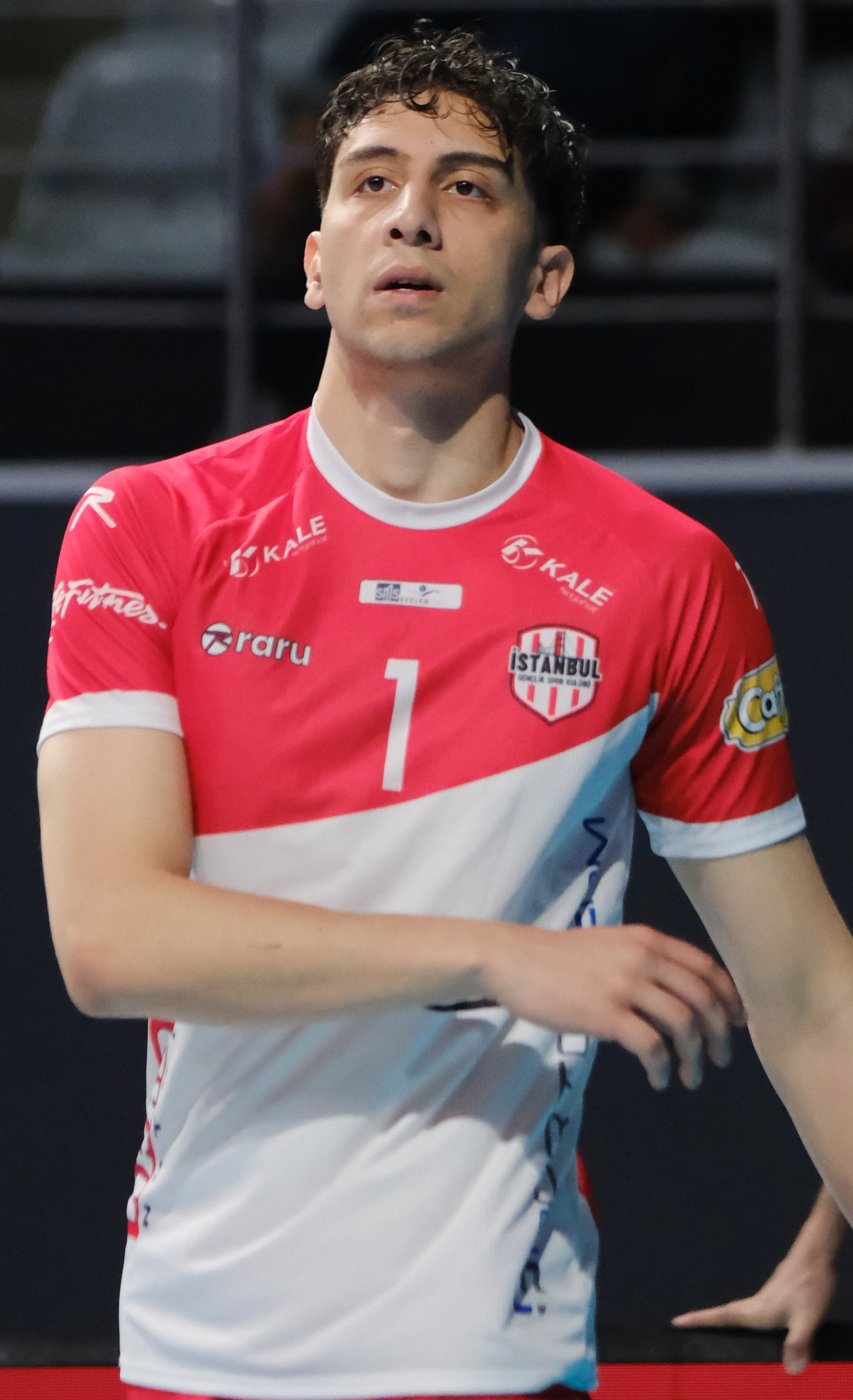

Personal information
- Full name: Yiğit Savaş Kaplan
- Born: 10 January 2004 (age 22) Turkey
- Height: 2.07 m (6 ft 9 in)
- Weight: 90 kg (198 lb)
- Spike: 365 cm (144 in)
- Block: 340 cm (134 in)

Volleyball information
- Position: Middle-blocker
- Current club: Galatasaray

Career
- Years: Team
- 2022–2023; 2023–2024; 2024–2026; 2026–: TVF Spor Lisesi; Spor Toto SK; İstanbul Gençlik Spor Kulübü; Galatasaray

National team
- Years: Team
- –: Turkey

Yiğit Savaş Kaplan (born 10 January 2004) is a Turkish volleyball player who plays as a Middle-blocker.

== Club career ==
On July 24, 2026, he signed a 3-year contract with Galatasaray.
