= Abdulsamet Yalçın =

Turkish volleyball player (born 2000)

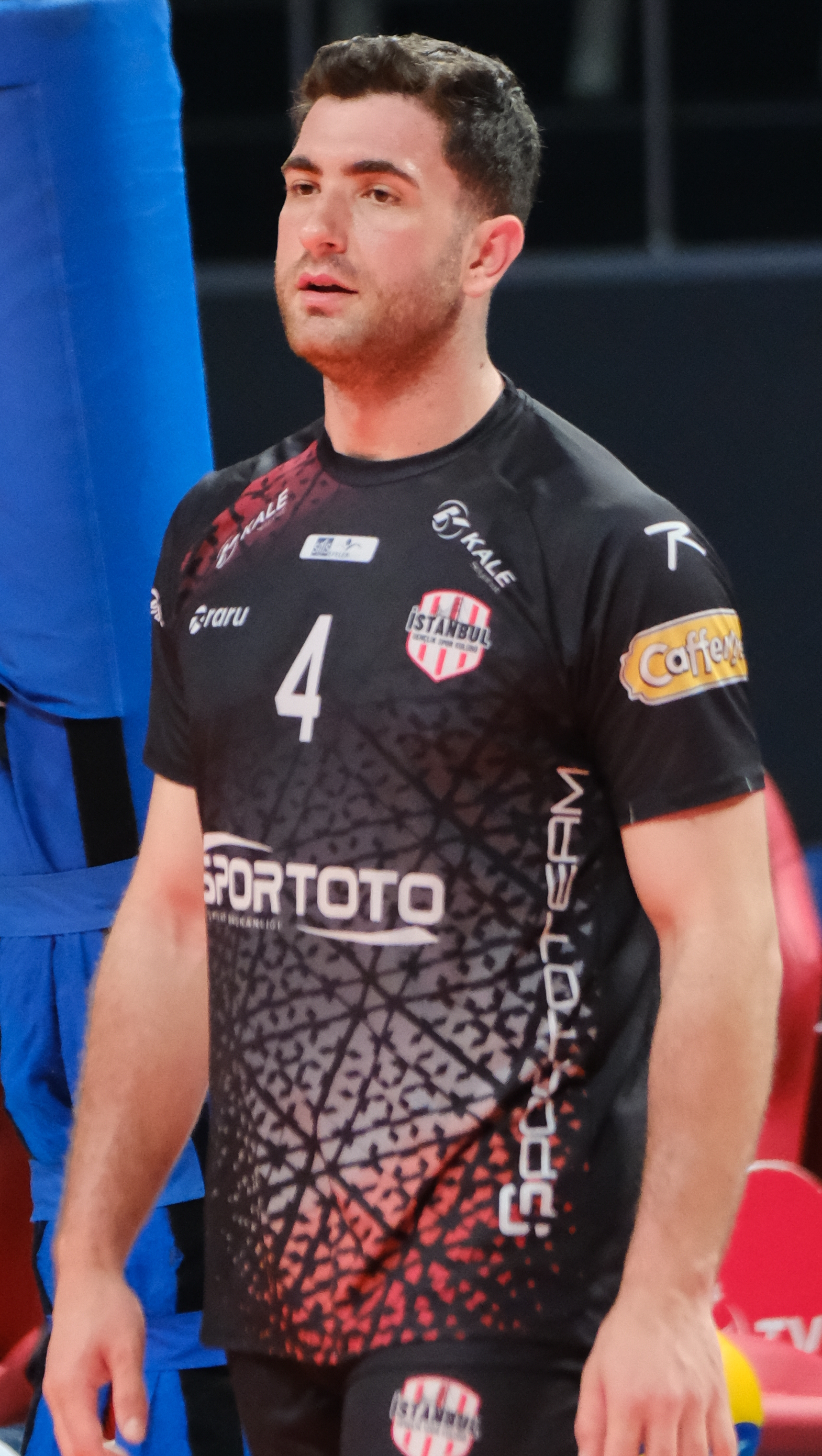

Personal information
- Full name: Abdulsamet Yalçın
- Born: 25 January 2000 (age 26); Turkey
- Height: 1.90 m (6 ft 3 in)
- Weight: 85 kg (187 lb)
- Spike: 330 cm (130 in)
- Block: 311 cm (122 in)

Volleyball information
- Position: Libero
- Current club: Galatasaray
- Number: 4

Career
Years
- 2017–2019
- 2018–2022
- 2022–2023
- 2023–2024
- 2024–2025
- 2025–2026
- 2026–
Teams
- İBB Spor Kulübü II
- İBB Spor Kulübü
- Spor Toto SK
- Ziraat Bankası
- Arkas Spor
- İstanbul Gençlik Spor Kulübü
- Galatasaray

National team
Turkey

Abdulsamet Yalçın (born 25 January 2000) is a Turkish volleyball player who plays as a Libero.

== Club career ==
On July 20, 2026, he signed a two-year contract with Galatasaray.
