= Can Koç =

Turkish volleyball player

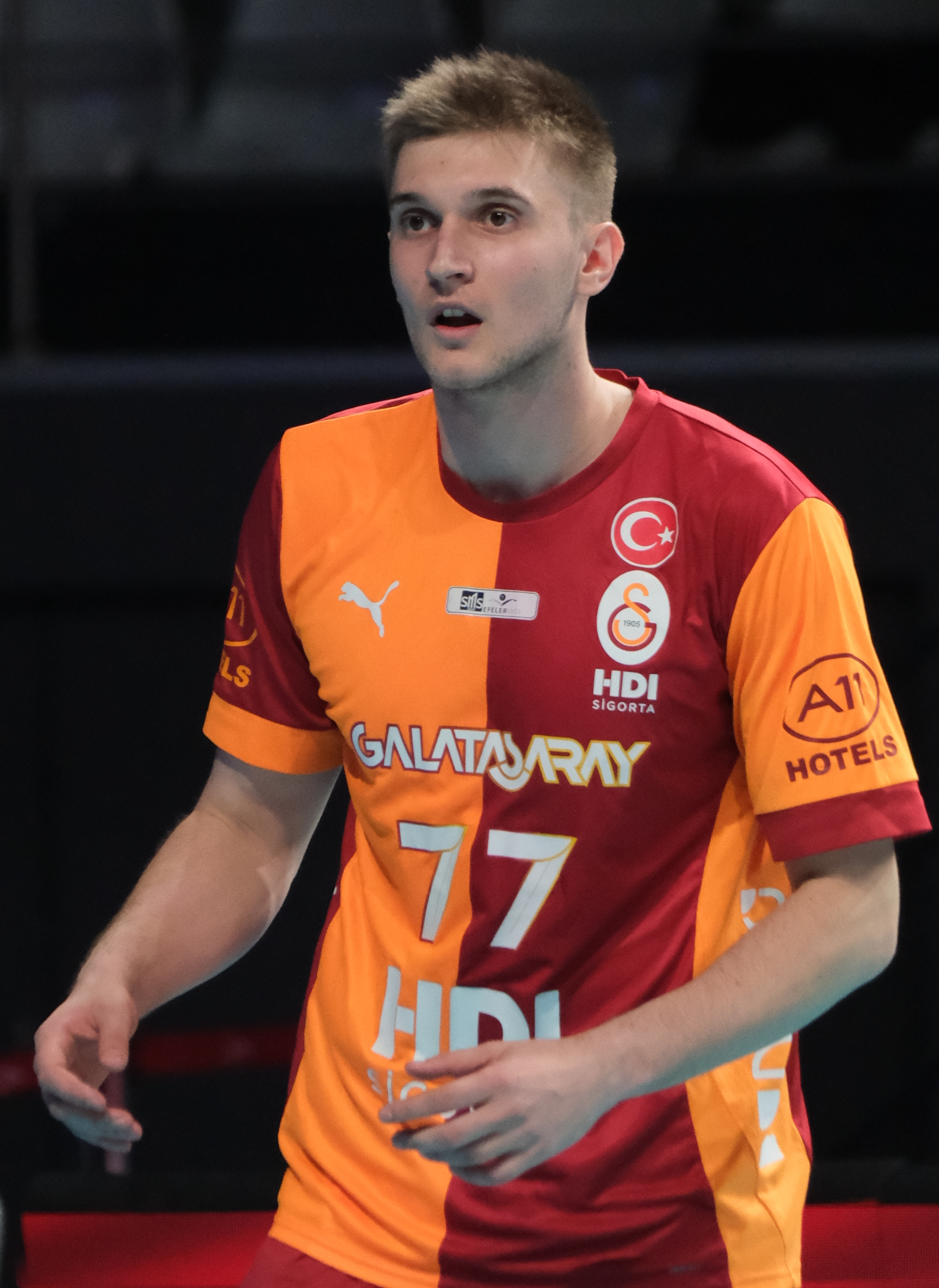

Personal information
- Full name: Can Koç
- Born: 29 April 2003 (age 23); Turkey
- Height: 2.00 m (6 ft 7 in)
- Weight: 87 kg (192 lb)
- Spike: 350 cm (138 in)
- Block: 335 cm (132 in)

Volleyball information
- Position: Opposite
- Current club: Galatasaray HDI Sigorta
- Number: 77

Career
Years
- 2020–2023
- 2023–2024
- 2024–2025
- 2025–
Teams
- İBB Spor Kulübü
- Akkuş Belediyespor
- Arkas Spor
- Galatasaray HDI Sigorta

National team
Turkey

Can Koç (born 29 April 2003) is a Turkish volleyball player who plays as an Opposite.

== Club career ==
He signed a 2–year contract with Galatasaray HDI Sigorta on June 12, 2025.
