= Cafer Kirkit =

Turkish volleyball player (born 2001)

Personal information
- Full name: Cafer Kirkit
- Born: 1 January 2001 (age 25) Turkey
- Height: 1.93 m (6 ft 4 in)
- Weight: 85 kg (187 lb)
- Spike: 330 cm (130 in)
- Block: 355 cm (140 in)

Volleyball information
- Position: Outside Hitter
- Current club: Galatasaray

Career
- Years: Team
- 2018–2021; 2021–2022; 2022–2023; 2023–2024; 2024–2026; 2026–: Ziraat Bankası; Altekma SK; Hatay Büyükşehir Belediyespor; Alanya Belediyespor; Altekma SK; Galatasaray

National team
- Years: Team
- –: Turkey

Cafer Kirkit (born 1 January 2001) is a Turkish volleyball player who plays as an Outside Hitter.

== Club career ==
On August 5, 2026, he signed a one-year contract with Galatasaray.
