= Ramazan Efe Mandıracı =

Turkish volleyball player (born 2002)

Efe Mandıracı

Personal information
- Full name: Ramazan Efe Mandıracı
- Born: 1 April 2002 (age 24); Kuşadası, Aydın, Turkey
- Height: 2.03 m (6 ft 8 in)
- Weight: 86 kg (190 lb)
- Spike: 370 cm (146 in)
- Block: 345 cm (136 in)

Volleyball information
- Position: Outside Hitter
- Current club: Galatasaray
- Number: 99

Career
Years
- 2017–2029
- 2019–2020
- 2019–2024
- 2024–2026
- 2026–present
Teams
- İzmir Saint Joseph Spor Kulübü
- TFL Altekma SK
- Arkas Spor
- Gas Sales Bluenergy Piacenza
- Galatasaray

National team
- 2018
- 2020
- 2021–present
- Turkey U-18
- Turkey U-20
- Turkey

Ramazan Efe Mandıracı (born 1 April 2002) is a Turkish volleyball player who plays as an Outside Hitter.

== Club career ==
On August 7, 2026, he signed a two-year contract with Galatasaray.

== Personal life ==
On October 19, 2023, he married Zeliha Ağrıs, a Turkish national taekwondo athlete.
