= Özgür Benzer =

Turkish volleyball player (born 2005)

Personal information
- Full name: Özgür Benzer
- Born: 1 February 2005 (age 21) Turkey
- Height: 1.97 m (6 ft 6 in)
- Weight: 81 kg (179 lb)
- Spike: 350 cm (138 in)
- Block: 320 cm (126 in)

Volleyball information
- Position: Setter
- Current club: Galatasaray
- Number: 19

Career
- Years: Team
- 2021–2026; 2026–: İBB Spor Kulübü; Galatasaray

National team
- Years: Team
- –: Turkey

Özgür Benzer (born 2 January 2005) is a Turkish volleyball player who plays as a setter.

== Club career ==
On July 29, 2026, he signed a three-year contract with Galatasaray.
