= 2026–27 Tauron Liga =

Polish volleyball league

- League: Tauron Liga
- Sport: Volleyball
- Duration: 16 October 2026 – May 2027
- Teams: 14
- TV partner: Polsat Sport

Seasons
- 2025–26 2027–28

The 2026–27 Tauron Liga is the 91st season of the Polish Volleyball Championship, the 74th season of the highest tier domestic division in the Polish volleyball league system since its establishment in 1954, and the 27th season as a professional league. The league is operated by the Polish Volleyball League SA (Polish: Polska Liga Siatkówki SA). In addition, it is the first season under the league's new name, Tauron Liga, which replaces PlusLiga after 18 consecutive seasons.

This season is composed of 14 teams. The regular season is played as a round-robin tournament. Each team plays a total of 26 matches, half at home and half away. The season started on 16 October 2026 and will conclude in May 2027.

== Regular season ==
Ranking system:

1. Points
2. Number of victories
3. Set ratio
4. Setpoint ratio
5. H2H results

Result	Winners	Losers
3–0	3 points	0 points
3–1	3 points	0 points
3–2	2 points	1 point

Pos	Team	Pld	W	L	Pts	SW	SL	SR	SPW	SPL	SPR
1	Aluron CMC Warta Zawiercie	9	8	1	24	24	6	4.000	745	628	1.186
2	Bogdanka LUK Lublin	7	7	0	21	21	2	10.500	575	483	1.190
3	PGE Projekt Warsaw	8	6	2	18	21	12	1.750	761	715	1.064
4	ZAKSA Kędzierzyn-Koźle	7	5	2	13	16	11	1.455	627	616	1.018
5	PGE GiEK Skra Bełchatów	7	4	3	12	15	13	1.154	622	635	0.980
6	GKS Katowice	7	4	3	11	14	13	1.077	588	597	0.985
7	Asseco Resovia	7	3	4	10	13	15	0.867	621	597	1.040
8	Energa Trefl Gdańsk	8	3	5	9	13	18	0.722	684	715	0.957
9	Podziemia Kredowe ChKS Chełm	7	3	4	7	13	18	0.722	641	677	0.947
10	Ślepsk Malow Suwałki	7	1	6	7	11	19	0.579	630	655	0.962
11	Jastrzębie Barkom	7	2	5	6	11	17	0.647	593	632	0.938
12	Neonet Norwid Częstochowa	7	2	5	6	10	18	0.556	591	620	0.953
13	Stilon Gorzów	7	2	5	5	8	19	0.421	569	616	0.924
14	Energa Indykpol AZS Olsztyn	7	1	6	4	9	18	0.500	580	641	0.905

Updated to match(es) played on 21 November 2026. Source: Tauron Liga

=== 1st round ===
Date	Time		Score		Set 1	Set 2	Set 3	Set 4	Set 5	Total	Report
16 Oct	17:30	GKS Katowice	3–0	Aluron CMC Warta Zawiercie	26–24	25–23	25–22			76–69	
16 Oct	20:30	PGE Projekt Warsaw	3–1	Energa Indykpol AZS Olsztyn	27–29	25–23	25–17	25–16		102–85	
17 Oct	15:00	Neonet Norwid Częstochowa	3–2	Asseco Resovia	26–28	21–25	25–22	25–16	15–13	112–104	
17 Oct	18:00	PGE GiEK Skra Bełchatów	3–1	Energa Trefl Gdańsk	25–23	19–25	25–18	31–29		100–95	
18 Oct	15:00	ZAKSA Kędzierzyn-Koźle	0–3	Bogdanka LUK Lublin	23–25	22–25	21–25			66–75	
18 Oct	18:00	Ślepsk Malow Suwałki	2–3	Jastrzębie Barkom	23–25	19–25	25–22	25–18	10–15	102–105	
19 Oct	17:30	Podziemia Kredowe ChKS Chełm	2–3	Stilon Gorzów	25–19	21–25	21–25	25–21	7–15	99–105	

=== 2nd round ===
Date	Time		Score		Set 1	Set 2	Set 3	Set 4	Set 5	Total	Report
20 Oct	17:30	Energa Indykpol AZS Olsztyn	3–0	Neonet Norwid Częstochowa	25–18	25–23	25–18			75–59	
21 Oct	17:30	Bogdanka LUK Lublin	3–0	Energa Trefl Gdańsk	25–22	25–22	25–21			75–65	
21 Oct	20:30	Aluron CMC Warta Zawiercie	3–1	ZAKSA Kędzierzyn-Koźle	25–17	25–22	22–25	32–30		104–94	
23 Oct	17:30	Ślepsk Malow Suwałki	2–3	GKS Katowice	22–25	25–16	23–25	25–22	11–15	106–103	
23 Oct	20:30	Stilon Gorzów	0–3	Jastrzębie Barkom	17–25	22–25	21–25			60–75	
24 Oct	18:00	PGE GiEK Skra Bełchatów	3–2	PGE Projekt Warsaw	25–17	25–22	15–25	23–25	15–12	103–101	
25 Oct	18:00	Podziemia Kredowe ChKS Chełm	0–3	Asseco Resovia	19–25	17–25	13–25			49–75	

=== 3rd round ===
Date	Time		Score		Set 1	Set 2	Set 3	Set 4	Set 5	Total	Report
29 Oct	17:30	Energa Indykpol AZS Olsztyn	0–3	ZAKSA Kędzierzyn-Koźle	17–25	20–25	23–25			60–75	
29 Oct	20:30	Asseco Resovia	3–1	Energa Trefl Gdańsk	22–25	25–20	25–20	25–14		97–79	
30 Oct	20:30	Ślepsk Malow Suwałki	3–1	Neonet Norwid Częstochowa	25–21	25–15	19–25	25–18		94–79	
31 Oct	15:00	Stilon Gorzów	0–3	PGE Projekt Warsaw	23–25	18–25	25–27			66–77	
31 Oct	18:00	PGE GiEK Skra Bełchatów	0–3	Aluron CMC Warta Zawiercie	16–25	21–25	16–25			53–75	
31 Oct	20:30	Bogdanka LUK Lublin	3–0	GKS Katowice	25–18	25–17	25–21			75–56	
1 Nov	15:00	Jastrzębie Barkom	2–3	Podziemia Kredowe ChKS Chełm	25–14	22–25	25–20	23–25	10–15	105–99	

=== 4th round ===
Date	Time		Score		Set 1	Set 2	Set 3	Set 4	Set 5	Total	Report
3 Nov	17:30	Energa Trefl Gdańsk	2–3	Stilon Gorzów	22–25	19–25	25–21	25–21	13–15	104–107	
4 Nov	17:30	Aluron CMC Warta Zawiercie	3–1	Energa Indykpol AZS Olsztyn	23–25	25–20	25–16	25–20		98–81	
4 Nov	20:30	Bogdanka LUK Lublin	3–1	PGE GiEK Skra Bełchatów	25–27	25–20	26–24	26–24		102–95	
5 Nov	20:30	PGE Projekt Warsaw	3–2	Ślepsk Malow Suwałki	20–25	25–20	25–21	18–25	15–7	103–98	
10 Nov	17:30	GKS Katowice	2–3	Podziemia Kredowe ChKS Chełm	16–25	23–25	25–20	25–19	13–15	102–104	
11 Nov	17:30	Neonet Norwid Częstochowa	3–1	Jastrzębie Barkom	25–15	25–17	22–25	25–15		97–72	
11 Nov	20:30	ZAKSA Kędzierzyn-Koźle	3–2	Asseco Resovia	20–25	25–22	25–22	20–25	15–13	105–107	

=== 5th round ===
Date	Time		Score		Set 1	Set 2	Set 3	Set 4	Set 5	Total	Report
27 Oct	17:30	PGE GiEK Skra Bełchatów	3–0	GKS Katowice	25–18	25–21	26–24			76–63	
7 Nov	15:00	Stilon Gorzów	2–3	ZAKSA Kędzierzyn-Koźle	25–18	25–27	25–20	26–28	16–18	117–111	
7 Nov	18:00	Podziemia Kredowe ChKS Chełm	3–2	Neonet Norwid Częstochowa	16–25	25–21	22–25	25–18	15–10	103–99	
8 Nov	15:00	Asseco Resovia	0–3	Aluron CMC Warta Zawiercie	19–25	26–28	18–25			63–78	
8 Nov	18:00	Ślepsk Malow Suwałki	2–3	Energa Trefl Gdańsk	24–26	27–25	25–23	19–25	12–15	107–114	
8 Nov	20:30	Jastrzębie Barkom	1–3	PGE Projekt Warsaw	21–25	18–25	25–23	23–25		87–98	
9 Nov	17:30	Energa Indykpol AZS Olsztyn	1–3	Bogdanka LUK Lublin	18–25	21–25	25–23	20–25		84–98	

=== 6th round ===
Date	Time		Score		Set 1	Set 2	Set 3	Set 4	Set 5	Total	Report
13 Nov	17:30	PGE Projekt Warsaw	3–1	Podziemia Kredowe ChKS Chełm	16–25	31–29	26–24	25–17		98–95	
13 Nov	20:30	GKS Katowice	3–0	Neonet Norwid Częstochowa	25–20	25–19	25–18			75–57	
14 Nov	15:00	PGE GiEK Skra Bełchatów	3–1	Energa Indykpol AZS Olsztyn	25–20	21–25	25–18	25–22		96–85	
14 Nov	18:00	Ślepsk Malow Suwałki	0–3	ZAKSA Kędzierzyn-Koźle	23–25	23–25	18–25			64–75	
14 Nov	20:30	Aluron CMC Warta Zawiercie	3–0	Stilon Gorzów	25–20	25–17	25–21			75–58	
15 Oct	15:00	Bogdanka LUK Lublin	3–0	Asseco Resovia	25–17	25–21	25–23			75–61	
15 Oct	18:00	Energa Trefl Gdańsk	3–0	Jastrzębie Barkom	25–22	25–20	25–18			75–60	

=== 7th round ===
Date	Time		Score		Set 1	Set 2	Set 3	Set 4	Set 5	Total	Report
18 Nov	20:30	Stilon Gorzów	0–3	Bogdanka LUK Lublin	20–25	18–25	18–25			56–75	
19 Nov	17:30	Neonet Norwid Częstochowa	1–3	PGE Projekt Warsaw	22–25	25–22	20–25	21–25		88–97	
19 Nov	20:30	ZAKSA Kędzierzyn-Koźle	3–1	Jastrzębie Barkom	25–21	25–21	26–28	25–19		101–89	
20 Nov	17:30	Energa Indykpol AZS Olsztyn	2–3	GKS Katowice	25–27	20–25	25–22	25–22	15–17	110–113	
21 Nov	15:00	Asseco Resovia	3–2	PGE GiEK Skra Bełchatów	26–28	25–17	25–16	23–25	15–13	114–99	
21 Nov	18:00	Aluron CMC Warta Zawiercie	3–0	Ślepsk Malow Suwałki	25–14	25–21	26–24			76–59	
21 Nov	20:30	Podziemia Kredowe ChKS Chełm	1–3	Energa Trefl Gdańsk	25–15	23–25	26–28	18–25		92–93	

=== 8th round ===
Date	Time		Score		Set 1	Set 2	Set 3	Set 4	Set 5	Total	Report
23 Nov	20:30	Bogdanka LUK Lublin	–	Ślepsk Malow Suwałki	–	–	–			0–0	
24 Nov	17:30	Energa Trefl Gdańsk	–	Neonet Norwid Częstochowa	–	–	–			0–0	
24 Nov	20:30	Aluron CMC Warta Zawiercie	–	Jastrzębie Barkom	–	–	–			0–0	
25 Nov	17:30	Energa Indykpol AZS Olsztyn	–	Asseco Resovia	–	–	–			0–0	
25 Nov	20:30	GKS Katowice	–	PGE Projekt Warsaw	–	–	–			0–0	
2 Dec	17:30	ZAKSA Kędzierzyn-Koźle	–	Podziemia Kredowe ChKS Chełm	–	–	–			0–0	
2 Dec	20:30	PGE GiEK Skra Bełchatów	–	Stilon Gorzów	–	–	–			0–0	

=== 11th round ===
Date	Time		Score		Set 1	Set 2	Set 3	Set 4	Set 5	Total	Report
28 Oct	20:30	PGE Projekt Warsaw	1–3	Aluron CMC Warta Zawiercie	25–18	22–25	17–25	21–25		85–93	

=== 12th round ===
Date	Time		Score		Set 1	Set 2	Set 3	Set 4	Set 5	Total	Report
18 Nov	17:30	Energa Trefl Gdańsk	0–3	Aluron CMC Warta Zawiercie	14–25	25–27	20–25			59–77	

== Squads ==
Aluron CMC Warta Zawiercie
No.	Name	Date of birth	Height	Position
1	(United States) Michael Wright	18 June 2001	1.93 m (6 ft 4 in)	setter
2	(Poland) Bartosz Kwolek	17 July 1997	1.93 m (6 ft 4 in)	outside hitter
3	(United States) Aaron Russell	4 June 1993	2.05 m (6 ft 9 in)	outside hitter
5	(Poland) Miłosz Zniszczoł	2 July 1986	2.00 m (6 ft 7 in)	middle blocker
7	(Poland) Jakub Kochanowski	17 July 1997	1.99 m (6 ft 6 in)	middle blocker
9	(Poland) Bartłomiej Bołądź	28 September 1994	2.04 m (6 ft 8 in)	opposite
10	(Poland) Jakub Popiwczak	17 April 1996	1.80 m (5 ft 11 in)	libero
11	(Italy) Kamil Rychlicki	1 November 1996	2.05 m (6 ft 9 in)	opposite
12	(Poland) Adrian Markiewicz	12 April 2002	2.13 m (7 ft 0 in)	middle blocker
15	(Portugal) Miguel Tavares	2 March 1993	1.92 m (6 ft 4 in)	setter
20	(Poland) Mateusz Bieniek	5 April 1994	2.10 m (6 ft 11 in)	middle blocker
21	(Poland) Tomasz Fornal	31 August 1997	2.00 m (6 ft 7 in)	outside hitter
37	(Poland) Dawid Ogórek	30 July 1990	1.84 m (6 ft 0 in)	libero
99	(Poland) Patryk Łaba	30 July 1991	1.88 m (6 ft 2 in)	outside hitter
Head coach:		(Poland) Michał Winiarski		

Asseco Resovia
No.	Name	Date of birth	Height	Position
1	(Poland) Mateusz Poręba	24 August 1999	2.04 m (6 ft 8 in)	middle blocker
2	(Poland) Dawid Woch	16 May 1997	2.00 m (6 ft 7 in)	middle blocker
3	(Poland) Wiktor Nowak	21 May 1999	1.86 m (6 ft 1 in)	setter
4	(Poland) Kamil Kwasowski	13 September 1990	1.97 m (6 ft 6 in)	outside hitter
5	(Poland) Łukasz Kaczmarek	29 June 1994	2.04 m (6 ft 8 in)	opposite
6	(Canada) Danny Demyanenko	13 July 1994	1.96 m (6 ft 5 in)	middle blocker
10	(Germany) Tobias Brand	9 July 1998	1.95 m (6 ft 5 in)	outside hitter
12	(Poland) Artur Szalpuk	20 March 1995	2.02 m (6 ft 8 in)	outside hitter
13	(Poland) Michał Potera	6 March 1988	1.83 m (6 ft 0 in)	libero
16	(Poland) Paweł Zatorski	21 June 1990	1.84 m (6 ft 0 in)	libero
18	(Slovenia) Klemen Čebulj	21 February 1992	2.02 m (6 ft 8 in)	outside hitter
19	(Poland) Marcin Janusz	31 July 1994	1.95 m (6 ft 5 in)	setter
21	(Poland) Karol Butryn	18 June 1993	1.93 m (6 ft 4 in)	opposite
22	(Romania) Bela Bartha	19 October 2000	2.06 m (6 ft 9 in)	middle blocker
24	(Poland) Tymoteusz Lenik	30 January 2007	2.00 m (6 ft 7 in)	middle blocker
Head coach:		(Romania) Gheorghe Crețu		

Bogdanka LUK Lublin
No.	Name	Date of birth	Height	Position
1	(France) Moussé Gueye	11 November 1996	1.98 m (6 ft 6 in)	middle blocker
4	(Poland) Marcin Komenda	24 May 1996	1.98 m (6 ft 6 in)	setter
5	(Poland) Mikołaj Sawicki	23 November 1999	1.98 m (6 ft 6 in)	outside hitter
6	(Poland) Mateusz Malinowski	6 May 1992	1.98 m (6 ft 6 in)	opposite
7	(Poland) Jakub Wachnik	16 February 1993	2.02 m (6 ft 8 in)	outside hitter
8	(Poland) Paweł Rusin	5 March 1992	1.82 m (6 ft 0 in)	outside hitter
9	(Poland) Wilfredo León	31 July 1993	2.02 m (6 ft 8 in)	outside hitter
10	(Japan) Tomohiro Ogawa	4 July 1996	1.76 m (5 ft 9 in)	libero
11	(Bulgaria) Aleks Grozdanov	28 March 1998	2.08 m (6 ft 10 in)	middle blocker
12	(Japan) Ran Takahashi	2 September 2001	1.88 m (6 ft 2 in)	outside hitter
16	(Canada) Daenan Gyimah	15 January 1998	2.03 m (6 ft 8 in)	middle blocker
20	(Poland) Maciej Zając	5 March 2003	1.98 m (6 ft 6 in)	middle blocker
24	(Poland) Rafał Prokopczuk	23 March 1999	1.87 m (6 ft 2 in)	setter
35	(Poland) Kewin Sasak	20 February 1997	2.08 m (6 ft 10 in)	opposite
Head coach:		(France) Stéphane Antiga		

Energa Indykpol AZS Olsztyn
No.	Name	Date of birth	Height	Position
1	(Poland) Jakub Majchrzak	13 May 2004	2.08 m (6 ft 10 in)	middle blocker
2	(Germany) Moritz Karlitzek	12 August 1996	1.91 m (6 ft 3 in)	outside hitter
4	(Poland) Łukasz Kozub	3 November 1997	1.86 m (6 ft 1 in)	setter
5	(Poland) Jakub Ciunajtis	6 August 1998	1.77 m (5 ft 10 in)	libero
6	(Germany) Johannes Tille	7 May 1997	1.85 m (6 ft 1 in)	setter
11	(Poland) Seweryn Lipiński	1 January 2001	2.00 m (6 ft 7 in)	middle blocker
12	(Poland) Karol Urbanowicz	24 February 2001	2.00 m (6 ft 7 in)	middle blocker
13	(Poland) Kacper Sienkiewicz	11 April 2005	2.02 m (6 ft 8 in)	outside hitter
14	(Poland) Kuba Hawryluk	8 September 2003	1.81 m (5 ft 11 in)	libero
15	(Poland) Paweł Halaba	14 December 1995	1.94 m (6 ft 4 in)	outside hitter
19	(Poland) Paweł Cieślik	18 March 2000	1.97 m (6 ft 6 in)	middle blocker
21	(Poland) Szymon Patecki	4 April 2005	1.99 m (6 ft 6 in)	opposite
22	(Poland) Karol Borkowski	14 February 1998	1.95 m (6 ft 5 in)	outside hitter
31	(Canada) Arthur Szwarc	30 March 1995	2.07 m (6 ft 9 in)	opposite
74	(Bulgaria) Dimitar Dimitrov	12 November 2000	2.06 m (6 ft 9 in)	opposite
91	(Czech Republic) Jan Hadrava	3 June 1991	1.99 m (6 ft 6 in)	opposite
Head coach:		(Poland) Daniel Pliński		

Energa Trefl Gdańsk
No.	Name	Date of birth	Height	Position
1	(Poland) Piotr Nowakowski	18 December 1987	2.05 m (6 ft 9 in)	middle blocker
4	(Poland) Przemysław Stępień	7 February 1994	1.85 m (6 ft 1 in)	setter
5	(Poland) Patryk Niemiec	18 February 1997	2.02 m (6 ft 8 in)	middle blocker
6	(Poland) Mariusz Schamlewski	16 January 1991	1.98 m (6 ft 6 in)	middle blocker
7	(Poland) Damian Schulz	26 February 1990	2.08 m (6 ft 10 in)	opposite
8	(Finland) Voitto Köykkä	9 July 1999	1.79 m (5 ft 10 in)	libero
9	(Poland) Aliaksei Nasevich	5 June 2003	1.97 m (6 ft 6 in)	opposite
10	(Poland) Damian Kogut	3 January 1997	1.91 m (6 ft 3 in)	outside hitter
17	(Poland) Piotr Orczyk	19 March 1993	1.98 m (6 ft 6 in)	outside hitter
22	(Poland) Moustapha M'Baye	22 January 1992	1.98 m (6 ft 6 in)	middle blocker
26	(Poland) Maksymilian Durski	5 March 2007	1.88 m (6 ft 2 in)	outside hitter
27	(Poland) Michał Gierżot	4 October 2001	2.06 m (6 ft 9 in)	outside hitter
42	(Poland) Marcel Schadach	11 February 2008	1.74 m (5 ft 9 in)	libero
49	(United States) Joe Worsley	16 June 1997	1.85 m (6 ft 1 in)	setter
Head coach:		(Poland) Mariusz Sordyl		

GKS Katowice
No.	Name	Date of birth	Height	Position
1	(Poland) Bartłomiej Krulicki	15 September 1993	2.05 m (6 ft 9 in)	middle blocker
2	(Poland) Jakub Szymański	25 March 1998	2.00 m (6 ft 7 in)	outside hitter
4	(Poland) Bartosz Schmidt	3 June 1991	2.00 m (6 ft 7 in)	middle blocker
5	(Poland) Wojciech Ferens	5 April 1991	1.94 m (6 ft 4 in)	outside hitter
7	(Poland) Szymon Gregorowicz	7 March 1994	1.83 m (6 ft 0 in)	libero
8	(Serbia) Aleksa Batak	18 January 2000	1.98 m (6 ft 6 in)	setter
9	(Argentina) Gonzalo Quiroga	25 February 1993	1.92 m (6 ft 4 in)	outside hitter
10	(Poland) Damian Domagała	23 April 1998	1.99 m (6 ft 6 in)	opposite
11	(Poland) Michał Superlak	16 November 1993	2.06 m (6 ft 9 in)	opposite
12	(Poland) Wojciech Włodarczyk	28 October 1990	2.00 m (6 ft 7 in)	outside hitter
13	(United States) Matthew Knigge	2 June 1996	2.02 m (6 ft 8 in)	middle blocker
14	(Poland) Grzegorz Pająk	1 January 1987	1.96 m (6 ft 5 in)	setter
16	(Poland) Patryk Waloch	24 April 1995	1.76 m (5 ft 9 in)	libero
23	(Poland) Damian Hudzik	14 May 1998	2.04 m (6 ft 8 in)	middle blocker
Head coach:		(Poland) Emil Siewiorek		

Jastrzębie Barkom
No.	Name	Date of birth	Height	Position
3	(Australia) Lorenzo Pope	6 December 2001	2.05 m (6 ft 9 in)	outside hitter
4	(Canada) Maxwell Elgert	31 August 1998	1.93 m (6 ft 4 in)	setter
5	(Canada) Brodie Hofer	27 April 2000	1.99 m (6 ft 6 in)	outside hitter
7	(Poland) Adam Lorenc	30 October 1998	1.98 m (6 ft 6 in)	opposite
8	(Ukraine) Andrii Rohozhyn	13 July 1997	2.03 m (6 ft 8 in)	middle blocker
10	(Norway) Jakob Thelle	10 December 1999	1.98 m (6 ft 6 in)	setter
12	(Ukraine) Vladyslav Shchurov	27 April 2001	2.07 m (6 ft 9 in)	middle blocker
13	(Ukraine) Vasyl Tupchii	13 January 1992	1.96 m (6 ft 5 in)	opposite
18	(Poland) Wojciech Dudzik	18 December 2005	2.08 m (6 ft 10 in)	middle blocker
19	(Poland) Bartosz Firszt	19 March 1999	1.98 m (6 ft 6 in)	outside hitter
20	(Poland) Kamil Szymura	24 January 1999	1.85 m (6 ft 1 in)	libero
21	(Ukraine) Yaroslav Pampushko	11 January 2001	1.78 m (5 ft 10 in)	libero
23	(Poland) Bartłomiej Potrykus	5 January 2005	1.95 m (6 ft 5 in)	outside hitter
31	(Poland) Sebastian Adamczyk	28 February 1999	2.08 m (6 ft 10 in)	middle blocker
Head coach:		(Poland) Andrzej Kowal		

Neonet Norwid Częstochowa
No.	Name	Date of birth	Height	Position
1	(Poland) Oskar Hakert	29 April 2008	1.85 m (6 ft 1 in)	libero
5	(Poland) Jakub Kiedos	23 November 2006	2.04 m (6 ft 8 in)	outside hitter
6	(Poland) Daniel Popiela	29 April 2001	2.02 m (6 ft 8 in)	middle blocker
8	(Poland) Artur Sługocki	1 May 1999	1.96 m (6 ft 5 in)	outside hitter
9	(Poland) Mateusz Kufka	8 November 2003	1.97 m (6 ft 6 in)	middle blocker
10	(Poland) Bartosz Rembisz	21 December 2008	4.00 m (13 ft 1 in)	middle blocker
11	(Canada) Isaac Heslinga	22 January 2002	2.00 m (6 ft 7 in)	outside hitter
16	(Argentina) Pablo Kukartsev	25 March 1993	2.03 m (6 ft 8 in)	opposite
17	(Bosnia and Herzegovina) Željko Ćorić	24 August 1988	1.96 m (6 ft 5 in)	setter
19	(Poland) Tomasz Kowalski	12 June 1991	2.02 m (6 ft 8 in)	setter
21	(Denmark) Mads Jensen	24 April 1999	2.09 m (6 ft 10 in)	opposite
22	(Denmark) Oskar Madsen	17 January 2000	1.95 m (6 ft 5 in)	outside hitter
29	(Poland) Michał Grzyb	1 January 2005	1.97 m (6 ft 6 in)	outside hitter
73	(Poland) Jakub Nowak	11 June 2005	2.05 m (6 ft 9 in)	middle blocker
88	(Poland) Dominik Jaglarski	20 June 1997	1.87 m (6 ft 2 in)	libero
Head coach:		(Australia) Luke Reynolds		

PGE GiEK Skra Bełchatów
No.	Name	Date of birth	Height	Position
1	(Brazil) Alan Souza	21 March 1994	2.02 m (6 ft 8 in)	opposite
3	(Poland) Maksym Kędzierski	13 March 2003	1.83 m (6 ft 0 in)	libero
4	(Poland) Błażej Bień	3 November 2005	1.89 m (6 ft 2 in)	setter
5	(Poland) Arkadiusz Żakieta	13 October 1992	1.97 m (6 ft 6 in)	opposite
7	(Morocco) Zouheir El Graoui	1 July 1994	1.97 m (6 ft 6 in)	outside hitter
9	(Belgium) Igor Grobelny	8 June 1993	1.94 m (6 ft 4 in)	outside hitter
11	(France) Antoine Pothron	5 March 2002	1.98 m (6 ft 6 in)	outside hitter
12	(Poland) Grzegorz Łomacz	1 October 1987	1.88 m (6 ft 2 in)	setter
13	(Poland) Mateusz Nowak	29 February 2004	2.14 m (7 ft 0 in)	middle blocker
15	(Poland) Michał Szalacha	15 January 1994	2.02 m (6 ft 8 in)	middle blocker
16	(Poland) Adam Kowalski	16 September 1994	1.80 m (5 ft 11 in)	libero
19	(Poland) Bartłomiej Zawalski	13 February 1999	2.04 m (6 ft 8 in)	middle blocker
23	(Poland) Jordan Zaleszczyk	23 April 2002	2.03 m (6 ft 8 in)	middle blocker
27	(Poland) Kajetan Tokajuk	3 June 2000	1.97 m (6 ft 6 in)	outside hitter
Head coach:		(Poland) Krzysztof Stelmach		

PGE Projekt Warsaw
No.	Name	Date of birth	Height	Position
5	(Poland) Jan Firlej	26 September 1996	1.88 m (6 ft 2 in)	setter
6	(Poland) Karol Kłos	8 August 1989	2.01 m (6 ft 7 in)	middle blocker
7	(France) Kévin Tillie	2 November 1990	2.01 m (6 ft 7 in)	outside hitter
9	(Ukraine) Yurii Semeniuk	12 May 1994	2.10 m (6 ft 11 in)	middle blocker
10	(Poland) Bartosz Bednorz	25 July 1994	2.01 m (6 ft 7 in)	outside hitter
11	(Poland) Aleksander Śliwka	24 May 1995	1.97 m (6 ft 6 in)	outside hitter
14	(Poland) Maciej Olenderek	16 October 1992	1.78 m (5 ft 10 in)	libero
15	(Poland) Bartosz Gomułka	30 May 2002	2.02 m (6 ft 8 in)	opposite
16	(Italy) Yuri Romanò	26 July 1997	2.01 m (6 ft 7 in)	opposite
17	(Canada) Brandon Koppers	9 September 1995	2.02 m (6 ft 8 in)	outside hitter
18	(Poland) Damian Wojtaszek	7 September 1988	1.80 m (5 ft 11 in)	libero
77	(Poland) Bartłomiej Lemański	19 March 1996	2.16 m (7 ft 1 in)	middle blocker
85	(Poland) Michał Kozłowski	16 February 1985	1.91 m (6 ft 3 in)	setter
99	(Poland) Jakub Strulak	12 May 2001	2.10 m (6 ft 11 in)	middle blocker
Head coach:		(Italy) Roberto Piazza		

Podziemia Kredowe ChKS Chełm
No.	Name	Date of birth	Height	Position
1	(Poland) Maciej Muzaj	21 May 1994	2.07 m (6 ft 9 in)	opposite
2	(Poland) Mariusz Marcyniak	5 March 1992	2.06 m (6 ft 9 in)	middle blocker
3	(Poland) Jakub Olszewski	30 January 2003	1.90 m (6 ft 3 in)	outside hitter
4	(France) Yacine Louati	4 March 1992	1.98 m (6 ft 6 in)	outside hitter
6	(Poland) Daniel Ostaszewski	4 January 1993	1.84 m (6 ft 0 in)	libero
7	(Poland) Jakub Turski	6 September 1998	2.02 m (6 ft 8 in)	middle blocker
8	(Poland) Jędrzej Gruszczyński	13 November 1997	1.86 m (6 ft 1 in)	libero
9	(Canada) Jay Blankenau	27 September 1989	1.94 m (6 ft 4 in)	setter
12	(Iran) Amirhossein Esfandiar	24 January 1999	2.10 m (6 ft 11 in)	outside hitter
13	(Poland) Łukasz Swodczyk	6 January 1990	1.96 m (6 ft 5 in)	middle blocker
15	(Japan) Yuki Imahashi	25 December 2000	1.82 m (6 ft 0 in)	setter
25	(Poland) Cezary Sapiński	28 September 1994	2.03 m (6 ft 8 in)	middle blocker
77	(Poland) Aleksander Nowik	28 April 2006	2.04 m (6 ft 8 in)	outside hitter
88	(Poland) Tytus Nowik	10 January 2003	1.93 m (6 ft 4 in)	opposite
Head coach:		(Poland) Krzysztof Andrzejewski		

Stilon Gorzów
No.	Name	Date of birth	Height	Position
1	(Poland) Igor Nurkiewicz	9 June 2007	2.03 m (6 ft 8 in)	middle blocker
2	(Ukraine) Illia Kovalov	31 August 1996	1.98 m (6 ft 6 in)	outside hitter
3	(Poland) Mateusz Masłowski	13 June 1997	1.85 m (6 ft 1 in)	libero
6	(Serbia) Lazar Marinović	7 June 1998	1.98 m (6 ft 6 in)	outside hitter
7	(Poland) Dawid Siwczyk	13 June 1993	1.97 m (6 ft 6 in)	middle blocker
9	(Poland) Dawid Dulski	1 November 2002	2.10 m (6 ft 11 in)	opposite
11	(Poland) Fabian Drzyzga	3 January 1990	1.96 m (6 ft 5 in)	setter
13	(Poland) Mateusz Maciejewicz	12 March 2002	1.82 m (6 ft 0 in)	setter
15	(Poland) Jakub Czerwiński	22 July 2001	1.95 m (6 ft 5 in)	outside hitter
17	(Poland) Jakub Jurczyk	17 February 2006	1.83 m (6 ft 0 in)	libero
18	(Poland) Bartłomiej Mordyl	21 January 1995	2.01 m (6 ft 7 in)	middle blocker
19	(Serbia) Aleksandar Stefanović	22 November 1998	2.00 m (6 ft 7 in)	middle blocker
21	(Poland) Marcel Kiciński	20 March 2007	2.02 m (6 ft 8 in)	opposite
23	(Poland) Wojciech Więcławski	17 April 2005	1.94 m (6 ft 4 in)	outside hitter
Head coach:		(France) Hubert Henno		

Ślepsk Malow Suwałki
No.	Name	Date of birth	Height	Position
1	(Poland) Jan Nowakowski	17 May 1994	2.02 m (6 ft 8 in)	middle blocker
2	(Spain) Ángel Trinidad	27 March 1993	1.95 m (6 ft 5 in)	setter
3	(Poland) Maksymilian Łysoń	30 March 2007	2.00 m (6 ft 7 in)	opposite
5	(Poland) Karol Jankiewicz	21 February 1996	1.85 m (6 ft 1 in)	setter
7	(Argentina) Ignacio Luengas	28 January 1996	2.04 m (6 ft 8 in)	outside hitter
9	(Poland) Bartosz Filipiak	27 February 1994	1.97 m (6 ft 6 in)	opposite
10	(Poland) Marcel Hendzelewski	29 February 2004	1.91 m (6 ft 3 in)	outside hitter
11	(Poland) Paweł Pietraszko	5 October 1990	2.01 m (6 ft 7 in)	middle blocker
14	(Poland) Bartosz Mariański	26 May 1992	1.87 m (6 ft 2 in)	libero
15	(Germany) Moritz Reichert	15 March 1995	1.95 m (6 ft 5 in)	outside hitter
18	(Poland) Maksymilian Granieczny	7 July 2005	1.77 m (5 ft 10 in)	libero
33	(Poland) Łukasz Usowicz	13 August 1997	2.03 m (6 ft 8 in)	middle blocker
88	(Bulgaria) Asparuh Asparuhov	28 July 2000	2.00 m (6 ft 7 in)	outside hitter
95	(Poland) Jakub Macyra	22 July 1995	2.02 m (6 ft 8 in)	middle blocker
Head coach:		(Poland) Piotr Graban		

ZAKSA Kędzierzyn-Koźle
No.	Name	Date of birth	Height	Position
1	(Poland) Remigiusz Kapica	28 September 2000	2.00 m (6 ft 7 in)	opposite
5	(United States) Quinn Isaacson	19 February 1999	1.88 m (6 ft 2 in)	setter
7	(Poland) Marcel Steyer	28 November 2007	1.85 m (6 ft 1 in)	libero
8	(Netherlands) Fabian Plak	23 July 1997	1.99 m (6 ft 6 in)	middle blocker
9	(Poland) Marcin Kania	14 February 1996	2.03 m (6 ft 8 in)	middle blocker
10	(Poland) Mateusz Rećko	9 April 1998	1.97 m (6 ft 6 in)	opposite
11	(Poland) Bartosz Fijałek	30 August 2003	1.77 m (5 ft 10 in)	libero
12	(Poland) Bartosz Zych	15 July 2006	2.06 m (6 ft 9 in)	outside hitter
13	(Poland) Rafał Szymura	29 August 1995	1.97 m (6 ft 6 in)	outside hitter
17	(Germany) Jan Zimmermann	12 February 1993	1.90 m (6 ft 3 in)	setter
20	(France) Thomas Pujol	11 February 2005	1.98 m (6 ft 6 in)	outside hitter
23	(Poland) Aleksander Maciejewski	14 November 2006	1.98 m (6 ft 6 in)	middle blocker
34	(Poland) Szymon Jakubiszak	13 February 1998	2.08 m (6 ft 10 in)	middle blocker
66	(Poland) Kamil Kosiba	22 February 1999	2.00 m (6 ft 7 in)	outside hitter
77	(Poland) Marcin Krawiecki	21 July 1998	1.88 m (6 ft 2 in)	setter
Head coach:		(Italy) Andrea Giani		

== See also ==
- 2026–27 CEV Champions League
- Polish Men's Volleyball SuperCup
