= 2024–25 Polish Men's Volleyball Cup =

2024–25 Polish Volleyball Cup
- Sport: Volleyball
- Duration: 12–13 April 2025
- Total attendance: 38,849 (12,950 per match)
- TV partner: Polsat Sport

Finals
- Champions: Jastrzębski Węgiel (2nd title)
- Finals MVP: Tomasz Fornal (POL)

Seasons
- ← 2023–24 2025–26 →

The 2024–25 Polish Cup was the 68th edition of the Polish Volleyball Cup tournament.

Jastrzębski Węgiel beat Aluron CMC Warta Zawiercie in a rematch of the last season's final (3–1) and won their second Polish Cup. Tomasz Fornal was named MVP of the finals.

== Final four ==
- Venue: Tauron Arena, Kraków
- All times are Central European Summer Time (UTC+02:00).

Semifinals
12 April
Jastrzębski Węgiel	3
Bogdanka LUK Lublin	0
12 April
Projekt Warsaw	0
Aluron CMC Warta Zawiercie	3

Final
13 April
Jastrzębski Węgiel	3
Aluron CMC Warta Zawiercie	1

=== Semifinals ===
Date	Time		Score		Set 1	Set 2	Set 3	Set 4	Set 5	Total	Report
12 April	14:45	Jastrzębski Węgiel	3–0	Bogdanka LUK Lublin	25–23	25–23	25–23			75–69	Report
12 April	18:00	Projekt Warsaw	0–3	Aluron CMC Warta Zawiercie	18–25	21–25	19–25			58–75	Report

=== Final ===
Date	Time		Score		Set 1	Set 2	Set 3	Set 4	Set 5	Total	Report
13 April	14:45	Jastrzębski Węgiel	3–1	Aluron CMC Warta Zawiercie	18–25	25–22	25–22	30–28		98–97	Report

== Final standings ==
Qualified for the 2025 Polish SuperCup

Rank	Team
1st place, gold medalist(s)	Jastrzębski Węgiel
2	Aluron CMC Warta Zawiercie
Semifinalists	Bogdanka LUK Lublin; Projekt Warsaw

2024–25 Polish Cup winners
Jastrzębski Węgiel
2nd title

== Squads ==
Aluron CMC Warta Zawiercie
No.	Name	Date of birth	Height	Position
2	(Poland) Bartosz Kwolek	17 July 1997	1.93 m (6 ft 4 in)	outside hitter
3	(United States) Aaron Russell	4 June 1993	2.05 m (6 ft 9 in)	outside hitter
4	(Australia) Luke Perry	20 November 1995	1.80 m (5 ft 11 in)	libero
5	(Poland) Miłosz Zniszczoł	2 July 1986	2.00 m (6 ft 7 in)	middle blocker
7	(Poland) Szymon Gregorowicz	7 March 1994	1.83 m (6 ft 0 in)	libero
11	(Poland) Jakub Nowosielski	11 February 1993	1.93 m (6 ft 4 in)	setter
12	(Poland) Adrian Markiewicz	12 April 2002	2.13 m (7 ft 0 in)	middle blocker
13	(Poland) Yuriy Gladyr	8 July 1984	2.02 m (6 ft 8 in)	middle blocker
15	(Portugal) Miguel Tavares	2 March 1993	1.92 m (6 ft 4 in)	setter
20	(Poland) Mateusz Bieniek	5 April 1994	2.10 m (6 ft 11 in)	middle blocker
21	(Poland) Karol Butryn	18 June 1993	1.93 m (6 ft 4 in)	opposite
30	(Iran) Mobin Nasri	7 January 2003	2.01 m (6 ft 7 in)	outside hitter
55	(United States) Kyle Ensing	6 March 1997	2.01 m (6 ft 7 in)	opposite
99	(Poland) Patryk Łaba	30 July 1991	1.88 m (6 ft 2 in)	outside hitter
Head coach:		(Poland) Michał Winiarski		

Bogdanka LUK Lublin
No.	Name	Date of birth	Height	Position
1	(Poland) Jan Nowakowski	17 May 1994	2.02 m (6 ft 8 in)	middle blocker
4	(Poland) Marcin Komenda	24 May 1996	1.98 m (6 ft 6 in)	setter
5	(Poland) Mikołaj Sawicki	23 November 1999	1.98 m (6 ft 6 in)	outside hitter
6	(Poland) Mateusz Malinowski	6 May 1992	1.98 m (6 ft 6 in)	opposite
7	(Poland) Jakub Wachnik	16 February 1993	2.02 m (6 ft 8 in)	outside hitter
9	(Poland) Wilfredo León	31 July 1993	2.02 m (6 ft 8 in)	outside hitter
10	(Poland) Mikołaj Słotarski	2 October 2002	1.86 m (6 ft 1 in)	setter
11	(Bulgaria) Aleks Grozdanov	28 March 1998	2.08 m (6 ft 10 in)	middle blocker
16	(Poland) Maciej Czyrek	17 December 2000	1.83 m (6 ft 0 in)	libero
17	(Brazil) Thales Hoss	26 April 1989	1.90 m (6 ft 3 in)	libero
20	(Poland) Maciej Zając	5 March 2003	1.98 m (6 ft 6 in)	middle blocker
21	(Netherlands) Bennie Tuinstra	12 September 2000	2.00 m (6 ft 7 in)	outside hitter
33	(Canada) Fynn McCarthy	4 December 1999	2.03 m (6 ft 8 in)	middle blocker
35	(Poland) Kewin Sasak	20 February 1997	2.08 m (6 ft 10 in)	opposite
Head coach:		(Italy) Massimo Botti		

Jastrzębski Węgiel
No.	Name	Date of birth	Height	Position
1	(Poland) Marcin Waliński	24 October 1990	1.96 m (6 ft 5 in)	outside hitter
2	(Poland) Łukasz Kaczmarek	29 June 1994	2.04 m (6 ft 8 in)	opposite
3	(Poland) Jakub Popiwczak	17 April 1996	1.80 m (5 ft 11 in)	libero
5	(Poland) Arkadiusz Żakieta	13 October 1992	1.97 m (6 ft 6 in)	opposite
6	(France) Benjamin Toniutti	30 October 1989	1.83 m (6 ft 0 in)	setter
7	(Argentina) Luciano Vicentín	4 April 2000	1.97 m (6 ft 6 in)	outside hitter
9	(France) Timothée Carle	30 November 1995	1.98 m (6 ft 6 in)	outside hitter
10	(Argentina) Juan Ignacio Finoli	5 November 1991	1.89 m (6 ft 2 in)	setter
12	(Germany) Anton Brehme	10 August 1999	2.06 m (6 ft 9 in)	middle blocker
17	(Poland) Jakub Jurczyk	17 February 2006	1.83 m (6 ft 0 in)	libero
19	(Poland) Mateusz Kufka	8 November 2003	1.97 m (6 ft 6 in)	middle blocker
21	(Poland) Tomasz Fornal	31 August 1997	2.00 m (6 ft 7 in)	outside hitter
23	(Poland) Jordan Zaleszczyk	23 April 2002	2.03 m (6 ft 8 in)	middle blocker
99	(Poland) Norbert Huber	14 August 1998	2.07 m (6 ft 9 in)	middle blocker
Head coach:		(Argentina) Marcelo Méndez		

PGE Projekt Warsaw
No.	Name	Date of birth	Height	Position
1	(Poland) Jakub Kowalczyk	26 June 1986	2.00 m (6 ft 7 in)	middle blocker
4	(Poland) Jakub Kochanowski	17 July 1997	1.99 m (6 ft 6 in)	middle blocker
5	(Poland) Jan Firlej	26 September 1996	1.88 m (6 ft 2 in)	setter
6	(Germany) Tobias Brand	9 July 1998	1.95 m (6 ft 5 in)	outside hitter
7	(France) Kévin Tillie	2 November 1990	2.01 m (6 ft 7 in)	outside hitter
8	(Poland) Andrzej Wrona	27 December 1988	2.06 m (6 ft 9 in)	middle blocker
9	(Poland) Bartłomiej Bołądź	28 September 1994	2.04 m (6 ft 8 in)	opposite
10	(Ukraine) Yurii Semeniuk	12 May 1994	2.10 m (6 ft 11 in)	middle blocker
12	(Poland) Artur Szalpuk	20 March 1995	2.02 m (6 ft 8 in)	outside hitter
16	(Poland) Jędrzej Gruszczyński	13 November 1997	1.86 m (6 ft 1 in)	libero
18	(Poland) Damian Wojtaszek	7 September 1988	1.80 m (5 ft 11 in)	libero
20	(Germany) Linus Weber	1 November 1999	2.01 m (6 ft 7 in)	opposite
22	(Poland) Karol Borkowski	14 February 1998	1.95 m (6 ft 5 in)	outside hitter
85	(Poland) Michał Kozłowski	16 February 1985	1.91 m (6 ft 3 in)	setter
Head coach:		(Poland) Piotr Graban		

== See also ==
- 2024–25 PlusLiga
