= 2026 Memorial of Hubert Jerzy Wagner squads =

This article shows the rosters of all participating teams at the 2026 edition of the Memorial of Hubert Jerzy Wagner, held in Kraków, Poland.

== France ==
The following is France's roster in the 2026 Memorial of Hubert Jerzy Wagner.

Head coach: (Italy) Andrea Giani

- 1 Barthélémy Chinenyeze MB
- 2 Jenia Grebennikov L
- 3 Amir Tizi-Oualou S
- 4 Jean Patry OP
- 5 Alexandre Strehlau OH
- 6 Benjamin Toniutti S
- 9 Earvin N'Gapeth OH
- 11 Antoine Brizard S
- 12 Anatole Chaboissant S
- 14 Nicolas Le Goff MB
- 15 Mathis Henno OH
- 17 Trévor Clévenot OH
- 19 Yacine Louati OH
- 20 Benjamin Diez L
- 21 Théo Faure OP
- 23 Timothée Carle OH
- 24 Moussé Gueye MB
- 25 Quentin Jouffroy MB
- 30 François Huetz MB
- 31 Joris Seddik MB
- 32 Henri Léon OP
- 33 Antoine Pothron OH
- 35 Simon Magnin MB
- 37 Luca Ramon L
- 38 Nathan Feral OP
- 39 Nathan Canovas OH
- 40 Noa Duflos Rossi OH
- 42 Jules Duthoit MB

== Poland ==
The following was Poland's roster in the 2026 Memorial of Hubert Jerzy Wagner.

Head coach: (Serbia) Nikola Grbić

- 1 Aliaksei Nasevich OP
- 3 Jakub Popiwczak L
- 4 Marcin Komenda S
- 5 Mikołaj Sawicki OH
- 6 Bartosz Kurek OP
- 8 Mateusz Czunkiewicz L
- 9 Wilfredo León OH
- 10 Bartosz Bednorz OH
- 11 Aleksander Śliwka OH
- 12 Artur Szalpuk OH
- 13 Rafał Szymura OH
- 14 Kuba Hawryluk L
- 15 Jakub Kochanowski MB
- 16 Kamil Semeniuk OH
- 18 Maksymilian Granieczny L
- 20 Seweryn Lipiński MB
- 21 Tomasz Fornal OH
- 22 Kajetan Kubicki S
- 23 Jordan Zaleszczyk MB
- 27 Michał Gierżot OH
- 30 Bartłomiej Bołądź OP
- 31 Sebastian Adamczyk MB
- 34 Szymon Jakubiszak MB
- 35 Kewin Sasak OP
- 44 Łukasz Kozub S
- 50 Bartosz Gomułka OP
- 72 Mateusz Poręba MB
- 73 Jakub Nowak MB
- 96 Jan Firlej S
- 99 Norbert Huber MB

== Slovenia ==
The following was Slovenia's roster in the 2026 Memorial of Hubert Jerzy Wagner.

Head coach: (Italy) Fabio Soli

- 1 Tonček Štern OP
- 2 Alen Pajenk MB
- 3 Uroš Planinšič S
- 4 Jan Kozamernik MB
- 6 Urban Toman L
- 7 Luka Marovt OH
- 8 Rok Bračko OH
- 9 Dejan Vinčić S
- 10 Sašo Štalekar MB
- 11 Vid Ranc OH
- 12 Grega Okroglič L
- 13 Jani Kovačič L
- 14 Žiga Štern OH
- 15 Jaka Sešek OP
- 16 Gregor Ropret S
- 17 Tine Urnaut OH
- 18 Klemen Čebulj OH
- 19 Rok Možič OH
- 20 Nik Mujanović OP
- 21 Gregor Pernuš S
- 22 Janž Janez Kržič MB
- 23 Jošt Kržič MB
- 24 Nejc Najdič S
- 25 Klemen Šen OH
- 26 Miha Fink MB

== United States ==
The following was the United States's roster in the 2026 Memorial of Hubert Jerzy Wagner.

Head coach: (United States) Karch Kiraly

- 1 Camden Gianni OH
- 2 Kaleb Jenness OH
- 3 Mason Briggs L
- 4 Jeffrey Jendryk MB
- 5 Kyle Ensing OP
- 6 Quinn Isaacson S
- 7 Jacob Pasteur OH
- 8 Kevin Kobrine OP
- 9 Gabriel Garcia OP
- 12 Shane Holdaway MB
- 14 Micah Maʻa S
- 15 Kyle Hobus OP
- 16 Jacob Reilly L
- 17 Andrew Rowan S
- 18 Cooper Robinson OH
- 19 Patrick Gasman MB
- 20 Cameron Thorne MB
- 21 Zachary Rama OH
- 22 Erik Shoji L
- 23 Nolan Flexen OH
- 24 Merrick McHenry MB
- 25 Ethan Champlin OH
- 26 Matthew Knigge MB
- 27 Michael Marshman MB
- 28 Tread Rosenthal S
- 29 Jordan Ewert OH
- 30 Daniel Wetter MB
- 31 Michael Wright S
- 32 Parker Tomkinson MB
