= 2025–26 Polish Men's Volleyball Cup =

2025–26 Polish Volleyball Cup
- Sport: Volleyball
- Duration: 10–11 January 2026
- Total attendance: 30,595 (10,198 per match)
- TV partner: Polsat Sport

Finals
- Champions: Bogdanka LUK Lublin (1st title)
- Finals MVP: Kewin Sasak (POL)

Seasons
- 2024–25 2026–27

The 2025–26 Polish Cup was the 69th edition of the Polish Volleyball Cup tournament.

Bogdanka LUK Lublin, the reigning Polish Champions beat Asseco Resovia in the final, and won their maiden Polish Cup. Kewin Sasak was named MVP of the finals.

== Final four ==
- Venue: Tauron Arena, Kraków
- All times are Central European Time (UTC+01:00).

Semifinals
10 January
Bogdanka LUK Lublin	3
Indykpol AZS Olsztyn	2
10 January
PGE Projekt Warsaw	0
Asseco Resovia	3

Final
11 January
Bogdanka LUK Lublin	3
Asseco Resovia	0

=== Semifinals ===
Date	Time		Score		Set 1	Set 2	Set 3	Set 4	Set 5	Total	Report
10 January	14:45	Bogdanka LUK Lublin	3–2	Indykpol AZS Olsztyn	25–19	16–25	25–18	30–32	15–12	111–106	Report
10 January	18:00	PGE Projekt Warsaw	0–3	Asseco Resovia	21–25	22–25	22–25			65–75	Report

=== Final ===
Date	Time		Score		Set 1	Set 2	Set 3	Set 4	Set 5	Total	Report
11 January	14:45	Bogdanka LUK Lublin	3–0	Asseco Resovia	25–15	25–20	25–20			75–55	Report

== Final standings ==
Qualified for the 2026 Polish SuperCup

Rank	Team
1st place, gold medalist(s)	Bogdanka LUK Lublin
2	Asseco Resovia
Semifinalists	Indykpol AZS Olsztyn; PGE Projekt Warsaw

2025–26 Polish Cup winners
Bogdanka LUK Lublin
1st title

== Squads ==
Asseco Resovia
No.	Name	Date of birth	Height	Position
1	(Poland) Mateusz Poręba	24 August 1999	2.04 m (6 ft 8 in)	middle blocker
2	(Poland) Dawid Woch	16 May 1997	2.00 m (6 ft 7 in)	middle blocker
3	(Poland) Wiktor Nowak	21 May 1999	1.86 m (6 ft 1 in)	setter
4	(France) Yacine Louati	4 March 1992	1.98 m (6 ft 6 in)	outside hitter
5	(Poland) Jakub Bucki	13 August 1988	1.97 m (6 ft 6 in)	opposite
6	(Canada) Danny Demyanenko	13 July 1994	1.96 m (6 ft 5 in)	middle blocker
7	(Australia) Beau Graham	17 April 1994	2.05 m (6 ft 9 in)	middle blocker
11	(Czech Republic) Lukáš Vašina	6 July 1999	1.96 m (6 ft 5 in)	outside hitter
12	(Poland) Artur Szalpuk	20 March 1995	2.02 m (6 ft 8 in)	outside hitter
13	(Poland) Michał Potera	6 March 1988	1.83 m (6 ft 0 in)	libero
16	(Poland) Paweł Zatorski	21 June 1990	1.84 m (6 ft 0 in)	libero
18	(Slovenia) Klemen Čebulj	21 February 1992	2.02 m (6 ft 8 in)	outside hitter
19	(Poland) Marcin Janusz	31 July 1994	1.95 m (6 ft 5 in)	setter
21	(Poland) Karol Butryn	18 June 1993	1.93 m (6 ft 4 in)	opposite
22	(United States) Erik Shoji	24 August 1989	1.83 m (6 ft 0 in)	libero
25	(Poland) Cezary Sapiński	28 September 1994	2.03 m (6 ft 8 in)	middle blocker
Head coach:		(Italy) Massimo Botti		

Bogdanka LUK Lublin
No.	Name	Date of birth	Height	Position
1	(Canada) Daenan Gyimah	15 January 1998	2.03 m (6 ft 8 in)	middle blocker
2	(France) Hilir Henno	12 September 2003	2.03 m (6 ft 8 in)	outside hitter
4	(Poland) Marcin Komenda	24 May 1996	1.98 m (6 ft 6 in)	setter
6	(Poland) Mateusz Malinowski	6 May 1992	1.98 m (6 ft 6 in)	opposite
7	(Poland) Jakub Wachnik	16 February 1993	2.02 m (6 ft 8 in)	outside hitter
9	(Poland) Wilfredo León	31 July 1993	2.02 m (6 ft 8 in)	outside hitter
11	(Bulgaria) Aleks Grozdanov	28 March 1998	2.08 m (6 ft 10 in)	middle blocker
15	(Canada) Jackson Young	29 July 2001	1.95 m (6 ft 5 in)	outside hitter
16	(Poland) Maciej Czyrek	17 December 2000	1.83 m (6 ft 0 in)	libero
17	(Brazil) Thales Hoss	26 April 1989	1.90 m (6 ft 3 in)	libero
20	(Poland) Maciej Zając	5 March 2003	1.98 m (6 ft 6 in)	middle blocker
24	(Poland) Rafał Prokopczuk	23 March 1999	1.87 m (6 ft 2 in)	setter
33	(Canada) Fynn McCarthy	4 December 1999	2.03 m (6 ft 8 in)	middle blocker
35	(Poland) Kewin Sasak	20 February 1997	2.08 m (6 ft 10 in)	opposite
Head coach:		(France) Stéphane Antiga		

Indykpol AZS Olsztyn
No.	Name	Date of birth	Height	Position
2	(Germany) Moritz Karlitzek	12 August 1996	1.91 m (6 ft 3 in)	outside hitter
4	(Poland) Łukasz Kozub	3 November 1997	1.86 m (6 ft 1 in)	setter
5	(Poland) Jakub Ciunajtis	6 August 1998	1.77 m (5 ft 10 in)	libero
6	(Germany) Johannes Tille	7 May 1997	1.85 m (6 ft 1 in)	setter
7	(Poland) Dawid Siwczyk	13 June 1993	1.97 m (6 ft 6 in)	middle blocker
10	(Poland) Jakub Majchrzak	13 May 2004	2.08 m (6 ft 10 in)	middle blocker
11	(Poland) Seweryn Lipiński	1 January 2001	2.00 m (6 ft 7 in)	middle blocker
13	(Poland) Kacper Sienkiewicz	11 April 2005	2.02 m (6 ft 8 in)	outside hitter
14	(Poland) Kuba Hawryluk	8 September 2003	1.81 m (5 ft 11 in)	libero
15	(Poland) Paweł Halaba	14 December 1995	1.94 m (6 ft 4 in)	outside hitter
17	(Poland) Mateusz Janikowski	5 May 1999	2.01 m (6 ft 7 in)	outside hitter
19	(Poland) Paweł Cieślik	18 March 2000	1.97 m (6 ft 6 in)	middle blocker
21	(Poland) Szymon Patecki	4 April 2005	1.99 m (6 ft 6 in)	opposite
22	(Poland) Karol Borkowski	14 February 1998	1.95 m (6 ft 5 in)	outside hitter
31	(Canada) Arthur Szwarc	30 March 1995	2.07 m (6 ft 9 in)	opposite
91	(Czech Republic) Jan Hadrava	3 June 1991	1.99 m (6 ft 6 in)	opposite
Head coach:		(Poland) Daniel Pliński		

PGE Projekt Warsaw
No.	Name	Date of birth	Height	Position
4	(Poland) Jakub Kochanowski	17 July 1997	1.99 m (6 ft 6 in)	middle blocker
5	(Poland) Jan Firlej	26 September 1996	1.88 m (6 ft 2 in)	setter
6	(Poland) Karol Kłos	8 August 1989	2.01 m (6 ft 7 in)	middle blocker
7	(France) Kévin Tillie	2 November 1990	2.01 m (6 ft 7 in)	outside hitter
9	(Ukraine) Yurii Semeniuk	12 May 1994	2.10 m (6 ft 11 in)	middle blocker
10	(Poland) Bartosz Bednorz	25 July 1994	2.01 m (6 ft 7 in)	outside hitter
14	(Poland) Maciej Olenderek	16 October 1992	1.78 m (5 ft 10 in)	libero
15	(Poland) Bartosz Gomułka	30 May 2002	2.02 m (6 ft 8 in)	opposite
17	(Canada) Brandon Koppers	9 September 1995	2.02 m (6 ft 8 in)	outside hitter
18	(Poland) Damian Wojtaszek	7 September 1988	1.80 m (5 ft 11 in)	libero
19	(Poland) Bartosz Firszt	19 March 1999	1.98 m (6 ft 6 in)	outside hitter
20	(Germany) Linus Weber	1 November 1999	2.01 m (6 ft 7 in)	opposite
85	(Poland) Michał Kozłowski	16 February 1985	1.91 m (6 ft 3 in)	setter
99	(Poland) Jakub Strulak	12 May 2001	2.10 m (6 ft 11 in)	middle blocker
Head coach:		(Finland) Tommi Tiilikainen		

== Awards ==
- Most valuable player

(Poland) Kewin Sasak (Bogdanka LUK Lublin)

- Best setter

(Poland) Marcin Komenda (Bogdanka LUK Lublin)

- Best middle blocker

(Bulgaria) Aleks Grozdanov (Bogdanka LUK Lublin)

- Best libero

(Brazil) Thales Hoss (Bogdanka LUK Lublin)

- Best opposite spiker

(Poland) Kewin Sasak (Bogdanka LUK Lublin)

- Best outside hitter

(Poland) Wilfredo León (Bogdanka LUK Lublin)

== See also ==
- 2025–26 PlusLiga
- Polish Men's Volleyball SuperCup
