= Fynn McCarthy =

Canadian volleyball player (born 1999)

- Fynn McCarthy in Hirakata, 2026

Personal information
- Full name: Fynnian Lionel McCarthy
- Born: 4 December 1999 (age 26) Kelowna, British Columbia, Canada
- Home town: Lake Country, British Columbia, Canada
- Education: University of British Columbia
- Height: 2.02 m (6 ft 8 in)
- Weight: 89 kg (196 lb)
- Spike: 362 cm (143 in)
- Block: 321 cm (126 in)

Volleyball information
- Position: Middle Blocker
- Current club: Osaka Bluteon
- Number: 33

Career
- Years: Team
- 2017–2018 2018–2020 2021–2024 2024–2026 2026–: UBC Thunderbirds; Montpellier Volley; VK Lvi Praha; LKPS Lublin; Osaka Bluteon

National team
- Years: Team
- 2022–: Canada
Honours
Men's volleyball
Representing Canada
Pan American Cup
Silver medal – second place	2022 Gatineau
Gold medal – first place	2023 Guadalajara
NORCECA Championship
Silver medal – second place	2023 Durango City

Fynn McCarthy (born 4 December 1999) is a Canadian professional volleyball player who plays as a middle blocker for SV League club Osaka Bluteon and the Canadian national team.

Fynn McCarthy, Osaka Bluteons in front of the mascots of the Osaka Bluteons

== Career ==
McCarthy competed for the Canadian team as part of the 2024 FIVB Men's Volleyball Nations League. In July 2024, McCarthy was named to Canada's 2024 Olympic team.

== Personal life ==
For post secondary education, McCarthy attended University of British Columbia.

== Honours ==
=== University ===
- Domestic
  - 2017-18 U Sports Championship, with UBC Thunderbirds

=== Club ===
- CEV Challenge Cup
  - 2024–25 – with Bogdanka LUK Lublin
- Domestic
  - 2021-22 Czech Extraliga, with VK Lvi Praha
  - 2022-23 Czech Extraliga, with VK Lvi Praha
  - 2023-24 Czech Extraliga, with VK Lvi Praha
  - 2023-24 Czech Cup, with VK Lvi Praha
  - 2024–25 Polish Championship, with Bogdanka LUK Lublin
  - 2025–26 Polish SuperCup, with Bogdanka LUK Lublin
  - 2025–26 Polish Cup, with Bogdanka LUK Lublin
