= 2025 FIVB Men's Volleyball Nations League =

2025世界男排联赛 (Chinese); 2025 Shìjiè Nánpái Liánsài

Tournament details
- Host country: China
- City: Ningbo (final round)
- Dates: 11 June – 3 August
- Teams: 18 (from 4 confederations)
- Venue: 10 (in 10 host cities)

Final positions
- Champions: Poland (2nd title)
- Runners-up: Italy
- Third place: Brazil
- Fourth place: Slovenia
- Relegated: Netherlands

Tournament awards
- MVP: (Poland) Jakub Kochanowski
- Best Setter: (Italy) Simone Giannelli
- Best OH: (Poland) Wilfredo León; (Italy) Alessandro Michieletto
- Best MB: (Slovenia) Jan Kozamernik; (Poland) Jakub Kochanowski
- Best OPP: (Poland) Kewin Sasak
- Best Libero: (Brazil) Maique Nascimento

Tournament statistics
- Matches played: 116
- Attendance: 413,916 (3,568 per match)

The 2025 FIVB Men's Volleyball Nations League was the seventh edition of the FIVB Men's Volleyball Nations League, an annual men's international volleyball tournament. It took place from 11 June to 3 August 2025, with the final round held at the Beilun Gymnasium in Ningbo, China.

Following the results of the 2024 Challenger Cup, China made their comeback this edition, while Ukraine made their debut as the top FIVB ranked team.

Poland claimed their second title after defeating Italy in the final. Italy's silver was their first medal in the tournament. Brazil defeated Slovenia in the third place match. Jakub Kochanowski of Poland was named the MVP of the tournament.

== Teams ==
=== Qualification ===
Starting with this edition of the competition, the league was expanded from 16 to 18 teams. Due to this change of format none of the teams from the previous was relegated. The two additional spots were allocated to China, the winner of the 2024 Challenger Cup, and to Ukraine, the top-ranked non-qualified FIVB team.

Country	Confederation	Previous appearances			Previous best performance
Country	Confederation	Total	First	Last	Previous best performance
Argentina	CSV	6	2018	2024	5th place (2023)
Brazil	CSV	6	2018	2024	Champions (2021)
Bulgaria	CEV	6	2018	2024	11th place (2018)
Canada	NORCECA	6	2018	2024	6th place (2024)
China	AVC	4	2018	2023	13th place (2022)
Cuba	NORCECA	2	2023	2024	9th place (2024)
France	CEV	6	2018	2024	Champions (2022, 2024)
Germany	CEV	6	2018	2024	9th place (2018)
Iran	AVC	6	2018	2024	5th place (2019)
Italy	CEV	6	2018	2024	4th place (2022, 2023)
Japan	AVC	6	2018	2024	Runners-up (2024)
Netherlands	CEV	4	2021	2024	8th place (2022)
Poland	CEV	6	2018	2024	Champions (2023)
Serbia	CEV	6	2018	2024	5th place (2018)
Slovenia	CEV	4	2021	2024	4th place (2021, 2024)
Turkey	CEV	1	2024		16th place (2024)
Ukraine	CEV	0	None		Debut
United States	NORCECA	6	2018	2024	Runners-up (2019, 2022, 2023)

== Format ==
=== Preliminary round ===
The format of play is generally the same as in the 2022 edition. However, this is the first time that 18 men's teams are competing. Each week, six teams will compete during the pool phase. Each team plays 12 matches during the pool stage. During three weeks, each team plays four times in a table that is set up by an algorithm, with all teams playing 12 times in total at the end of the first phase. The eight best teams advance to the quarter-finals, while the last-placed team loses its place to the highest FIVB-ranked team that did not compete this year. The only country that has already qualified for this phase is China for hosting the finals and if it does not finish the first phase among the top eight, the top seven will qualify with the Chinese team being ranked 8th.

=== Final round ===
The VNL Finals will see the top eight teams moving directly to the knockout phase, which will consist of eight matches in total: four quarterfinals, two semi-finals, and the bronze and gold medal matches.

Final 8 direct elimination formula:

- The first ranked team will play a quarterfinal match against the eighth ranked team, the second ranked team will play a quarterfinal match against the seventh ranked team, the third ranked team will play a quarterfinal match against the sixth ranked team, and the fourth ranked team will play a quarterfinal match against the fifth ranked team.
- The national team of the hosting territory of the event will have a guaranteed berth for the Final round. If the host nation team do not finish in the top eight in the Preliminary round, they will replace the eighth place team and play as the eighth seed.

== Pool composition ==
The overview of pools was released on 10 December 2024.

Week 1			Week 2			Week 3		
Pool 1 Canada	Pool 2 Brazil	Pool 3 China	Pool 4 Bulgaria	Pool 5 United States	Pool 6 Serbia	Pool 7 Poland	Pool 8 Slovenia	Pool 9 Japan
Italy; France; Argentina; Canada; Germany; Bulgaria	Slovenia; United States; Brazil; Cuba; Ukraine; Iran	Poland; Japan; Serbia; Netherlands; Turkey; China	Japan; France; Slovenia; Ukraine; Turkey; Bulgaria	Poland; Italy; United States; Brazil; Canada; China	Argentina; Serbia; Germany; Cuba; Netherlands; Iran	Poland; France; Cuba; Iran; Bulgaria; China	Italy; Slovenia; Canada; Serbia; Netherlands; Ukraine	Japan; United States; Brazil; Argentina; Germany; Turkey

== Venues ==
=== Preliminary round ===
Week 1
Pool 1	Pool 2	Pool 3
Quebec City, Canada	Rio de Janeiro, Brazil	Xi'an, China
Videotron Centre	Maracanãzinho	Qujiang Sports Center
Capacity: 18,800	Capacity: 12,000	Capacity: 10,000
Week 2
Pool 4	Pool 5	Pool 6
Burgas, Bulgaria	Hoffman Estates, United States	Belgrade, Serbia
Arena Burgas	Now Arena	Belgrade Arena
Capacity: 6,100	Capacity: 10,543	Capacity: 18,386
Week 3
Pool 7	Pool 8	Pool 9
Gdańsk, Poland	Ljubljana, Slovenia	Chiba, Japan
Ergo Arena	Arena Stožice	Chiba Port Arena
Capacity: 11,409	Capacity: 12,480	Capacity: 7,512

=== Final round ===
All matches
Ningbo, China
Beilun Gymnasium
Capacity: 8,000
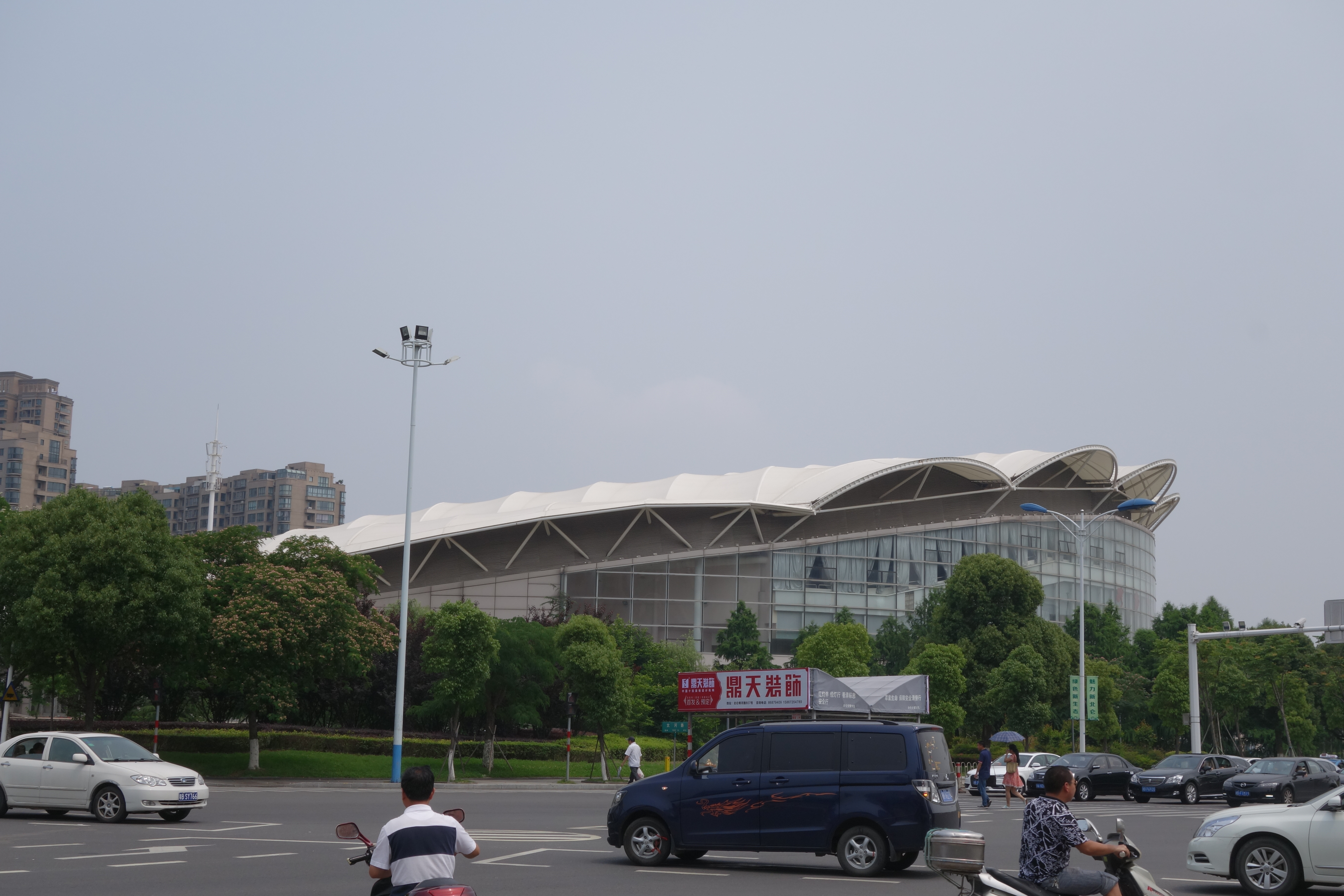

== Competition schedule ==
●	Preliminary round	●	Final round

Week 1 11–15 Jun	Week 2 25–29 Jun	Week 3 16–20 Jul	Week 4 30 Jul – 3 Aug
36 matches	36 matches	36 matches	8 matches

== Pool standing procedure ==
1. Total number of victories (matches won, matches lost)
2. In the event of a tie, the following first tiebreaker will apply, with the teams ranked by the most points gained per match as follows:
  - Match won 3–0 or 3–1: 3 points for the winner, 0 points for the loser
  - Match won 3–2: 2 points for the winner, 1 point for the loser
  - Match forfeited: 3 points for the winner, 0 points (0–25, 0–25, 0–25) for the loser
3. If teams are still tied after examining the number of victories and points gained, the FIVB will examine the results in order to break the tie in the following order:
  - Sets quotient: if two or more teams are tied on the number of points gained, they will be ranked by the quotient resulting from the division of the number of all sets won by the number of all sets lost.
  - Points quotient: if the tie persists based on the sets quotient, the teams will be ranked by the quotient resulting from the division of all points scored by the total of points lost during all sets.
  - If the tie persists based on the points quotient, the tie will be broken based on the team that won the match between the tied teams during the Round Robin Phase. When the tie in points quotient is between three or more teams, these teams will be ranked taking into consideration only the matches involving the teams in question.

== Preliminary round ==
=== Ranking ===
Pos	Team	Pld	W	L	Pts	SW	SL	SR	SPW	SPL	SPR	Qualification or relegation
1	Brazil	12	11	1	32	35	11	3.182	1095	998	1.097	Final round
2	Italy	12	10	2	28	33	14	2.357	1100	962	1.143	Final round
3	France	12	8	4	24	30	18	1.667	1124	1050	1.070	Final round
4	Japan	12	8	4	23	27	17	1.588	1036	977	1.060	Final round
5	Poland	12	8	4	23	30	20	1.500	1157	1129	1.025	Final round
6	Slovenia	12	7	5	19	22	22	1.000	1002	985	1.017	Final round
7	Cuba	12	6	6	20	28	26	1.077	1196	1174	1.019	Final round
8	Iran	12	6	6	19	25	24	1.042	1088	1061	1.025	
9	Ukraine	12	6	6	18	25	25	1.000	1087	1093	0.995	
10	Bulgaria	12	6	6	17	22	23	0.957	993	1033	0.961	
11	United States	12	6	6	17	21	24	0.875	1006	1033	0.974	
12	Argentina	12	6	6	16	24	26	0.923	1114	1118	0.996	
13	Canada	12	5	7	17	23	24	0.958	1064	1057	1.007	
14	Germany	12	5	7	17	25	27	0.926	1181	1179	1.002	
15	Serbia	12	3	9	10	15	29	0.517	926	1038	0.892	
16	Turkey	12	3	9	10	14	28	0.500	945	992	0.953	
17	China (Note: Qualified as finals' host)	12	3	9	9	12	30	0.400	881	990	0.890	Final round
18	Netherlands	12	1	11	5	11	34	0.324	942	1068	0.882	Excluded from the Nations League

Source: VNL 2025 – Men's standings

=== Week 1 ===
==== Pool 1 ====
- All times are Eastern Daylight Time (UTC−04:00).

Date	Time		Score		Set 1	Set 2	Set 3	Set 4	Set 5	Total	Report
11 Jun	11:00	Bulgaria	1–3	Italy	16–25	25–22	19–25	19–25		79–97	P2 Boxscore
11 Jun	16:30	Argentina	3–1	France	25–22	13–25	25–22	25–19		88–88	P2 Boxscore
11 Jun	20:00	Germany	2–3	Canada	25–23	19–25	25–21	23–25	11–15	103–109	P2 Boxscore
12 Jun	16:30	Germany	2–3	Italy	25–21	25–20	19–25	23–25	11–15	103–106	P2 Boxscore
12 Jun	20:00	Argentina	3–2	Canada	25–22	21–25	14–25	25–22	15–8	100–102	P2 Boxscore
13 Jun	16:30	Bulgaria	3–0	Argentina	25–21	25–20	28–26			78–67	P2 Boxscore
13 Jun	20:00	France	3–1	Italy	25–18	25–22	19–25	26–24		95–89	P2 Boxscore
14 Jun	16:30	Canada	2–3	France	22–25	27–29	29–27	25–21	6–15	109–117	P2 Boxscore
14 Jun	20:00	Bulgaria	3–2	Germany	25–22	22–25	25–19	23–25	15–12	110–103	P2 Boxscore
15 Jun	11:00	Argentina	1–3	Italy	23–25	25–17	35–37	21–25		104–104	P2 Boxscore
15 Jun	14:30	Germany	3–1	France	23–25	25–19	29–27	29–27		106–98	P2 Boxscore
15 Jun	18:00	Bulgaria	0–3	Canada	24–26	23–25	19–25			66–76	P2 Boxscore

==== Pool 2 ====
- All times are Brasília Time (UTC−03:00).

Date	Time		Score		Set 1	Set 2	Set 3	Set 4	Set 5	Total	Report
11 Jun	14:00	Ukraine	3–0	United States	25–22	25–20	25–23			75–65	P2 Boxscore
11 Jun	17:30	Brazil	3–0	Iran	25–19	25–16	25–18			75–53	P2 Boxscore
11 Jun	21:00	Slovenia	3–1	Cuba	25–22	21–25	25–18	25–15		96–80	P2 Boxscore
12 Jun	17:30	Brazil	2–3	Cuba	25–27	24–26	25–21	25–20	13–15	112–109	P2 Boxscore
12 Jun	21:00	United States	3–2	Iran	19–25	21–25	25–21	25–23	17–15	107–109	P2 Boxscore
13 Jun	17:30	Ukraine	3–2	Cuba	25–22	20–25	25–20	17–25	15–12	102–104	P2 Boxscore
13 Jun	21:00	Iran	2–3	Slovenia	25–17	23–25	18–25	25–18	12–15	103–100	P2 Boxscore
14 Jun	10:00	Ukraine	2–3	Brazil	25–19	25–14	22–25	23–25	10–15	105–98	P2 Boxscore
14 Jun	13:30	United States	1–3	Slovenia	22–25	25–27	25–20	23–25		95–97	P2 Boxscore
15 Jun	10:00	Brazil	3–0	Slovenia	25–19	29–27	25–19			79–65	P2 Boxscore
15 Jun	13:30	Ukraine	2–3	Iran	30–28	20–25	25–22	21–25	9–15	105–115	P2 Boxscore
15 Jun	17:00	Cuba	1–3	United States	22–25	18–25	25–18	23–25		88–93	P2 Boxscore

==== Pool 3 ====
- All times are China Standard Time (UTC+08:00).

Date	Time		Score		Set 1	Set 2	Set 3	Set 4	Set 5	Total	Report
11 Jun	13:30	Poland	3–1	Netherlands	25–22	22–25	25–22	25–22		97–91	P2 Boxscore
11 Jun	17:00	China	0–3	Japan	23–25	14–25	22–25			59–75	P2 Boxscore
11 Jun	20:30	Serbia	3–1	Turkey	12–25	25–22	25–23	25–23		87–93	P2 Boxscore
12 Jun	17:00	China	3–0	Serbia	25–23	25–23	25–20			75–66	P2 Boxscore
12 Jun	20:30	Poland	3–1	Japan	27–25	25–22	18–25	39–37		109–109	P2 Boxscore
13 Jun	17:00	Japan	3–0	Serbia	25–20	25–23	26–24			76–67	P2 Boxscore
13 Jun	20:30	Netherlands	3–1	Turkey	21–25	25–23	25–22	25–23		96–93	P2 Boxscore
14 Jun	15:00	China	3–1	Netherlands	25–19	25–20	13–25	25–17		88–81	P2 Boxscore
14 Jun	19:00	Turkey	0–3	Poland	26–28	23–25	21–25			70–78	P2 Boxscore
15 Jun	11:30	Netherlands	0–3	Japan	18–25	23–25	18–25			59–75	P2 Boxscore
15 Jun	15:00	China	0–3	Turkey	22–25	21–25	20–25			63–75	P2 Boxscore
15 Jun	19:00	Poland	3–0	Serbia	25–21	25–20	25–23			75–64	P2 Boxscore

=== Week 2 ===
==== Pool 4 ====
- All times are Eastern European Summer Time (UTC+03:00).

Date	Time		Score		Set 1	Set 2	Set 3	Set 4	Set 5	Total	Report
25 Jun	12:30	Ukraine	0–3	France	23–25	21–25	17–25			61–75	P2 Boxscore
25 Jun	16:00	Turkey	0–3	Slovenia	16–25	22–25	18–25			56–75	P2 Boxscore
25 Jun	19:30	Bulgaria	3–0	Japan	27–25	25–23	25–19			77–67	P2 Boxscore
26 Jun	15:00	France	2–3	Japan	22–25	25–19	25–22	20–25	11–15	103–106	P2 Boxscore
26 Jun	18:30	Turkey	0–3	Ukraine	11–25	22–25	21–25			54–75	P2 Boxscore
27 Jun	15:00	Ukraine	3–2	Japan	24–26	25–17	25–18	22–25	15–13	111–99	P2 Boxscore
27 Jun	19:30	Bulgaria	3–1	Slovenia	18–25	25–23	25–21	25–22		93–91	P2 Boxscore
28 Jun	15:30	Slovenia	0–3	France	23–25	27–29	23–25			73–79	P2 Boxscore
28 Jun	19:00	Bulgaria	0–3	Turkey	20–25	20–25	21–25			61–75	P2 Boxscore
29 Jun	12:00	Slovenia	0–3	Japan	25–27	15–25	16–25			56–77	P2 Boxscore
29 Jun	15:30	Turkey	0–3	France	20–25	18–25	19–25			57–75	P2 Boxscore
29 Jun	19:00	Bulgaria	1–3	Ukraine	25–20	19–25	24–26	22–25		90–96	P2 Boxscore

==== Pool 5 ====
- All times are Central Daylight Time (UTC−05:00).

Date	Time		Score		Set 1	Set 2	Set 3	Set 4	Set 5	Total	Report
25 Jun	12:30	Italy	3–2	Poland	25–17	23–25	21–25	25–20	15–11	109–98	P2 Boxscore
25 Jun	16:00	Canada	0–3	Brazil	22–25	17–25	17–25			56–75	P2 Boxscore
25 Jun	19:30	China	2–3	United States	22–25	25–21	25–19	16–25	11–15	99–105	P2 Boxscore
26 Jun	16:00	Brazil	3–0	China	25–22	25–16	25–23			75–61	P2 Boxscore
26 Jun	19:30	Canada	0–3	United States	23–25	22–25	28–30			73–80	P2 Boxscore
27 Jun	16:00	China	0–3	Italy	18–25	15–25	19–25			52–75	P2 Boxscore
27 Jun	19:30	Canada	2–3	Poland	32–30	25–14	17–25	23–25	13–15	110–109	P2 Boxscore
28 Jun	16:00	Brazil	3–2	Italy	25–22	21–25	33–31	17–25	15–13	111–116	P2 Boxscore
28 Jun	19:30	United States	0–3	Poland	20–25	21–25	22–25			63–75	P2 Boxscore
29 Jun	12:30	China	0–3	Canada	23–25	20–25	23–25			66–75	P2 Boxscore
29 Jun	16:00	Brazil	3–1	Poland	25–21	25–21	21–25	28–26		99–93	P2 Boxscore
29 Jun	19:30	United States	0–3	Italy	21–25	22–25	18–25			61–75	P2 Boxscore

==== Pool 6 ====
- All times are Central European Summer Time (UTC+02:00).

Date	Time		Score		Set 1	Set 2	Set 3	Set 4	Set 5	Total	Report
25 Jun	13:00	Germany	1–3	Cuba	25–19	18–25	22–25	21–25		86–94	P2 Boxscore
25 Jun	16:30	Netherlands	0–3	Argentina	20–25	14–25	22–25			56–75	P2 Boxscore
25 Jun	20:00	Serbia	1–3	Iran	21–25	19–25	25–23	23–25		88–98	P2 Boxscore
26 Jun	16:30	Netherlands	1–3	Germany	26–24	22–25	21–25	24–26		93–100	P2 Boxscore
26 Jun	20:00	Serbia	1–3	Cuba	25–22	22–25	16–25	16–25		79–97	P2 Boxscore
27 Jun	16:30	Argentina	1–3	Iran	21–25	25–22	22–25	22–25		90–97	P2 Boxscore
27 Jun	20:00	Netherlands	1–3	Cuba	25–21	18–25	21–25	28–30		92–101	P2 Boxscore
28 Jun	16:30	Germany	3–1	Iran	25–22	23–25	26–24	25–22		99–93	P2 Boxscore
28 Jun	20:00	Serbia	1–3	Argentina	25–18	18–25	23–25	12–25		78–93	P2 Boxscore
29 Jun	13:00	Iran	3–2	Netherlands	25–19	22–25	21–25	25–19	15–9	108–97	P2 Boxscore
29 Jun	16:30	Cuba	2–3	Argentina	25–23	23–25	21–25	25–21	11–15	105–109	P2 Boxscore
29 Jun	20:00	Germany	3–1	Serbia	25–20	25–21	23–25	25–17		98–83	P2 Boxscore

=== Week 3 ===
==== Pool 7 ====
- All times are Central European Summer Time (UTC+02:00).

Date	Time		Score		Set 1	Set 2	Set 3	Set 4	Set 5	Total	Report
16 Jul	13:00	China	1–3	France	25–22	22–25	23–25	17–25		87–97	P2 Boxscore
16 Jul	16:30	Bulgaria	2–3	Cuba	25–23	16–25	25–23	25–27	13–15	104–113	P2 Boxscore
16 Jul	20:00	Iran	2–3	Poland	19–25	25–23	18–25	25–21	8–15	95–109	P2 Boxscore
17 Jul	16:30	China	0–3	Iran	26–28	21–25	17–25			64–78	P2 Boxscore
17 Jul	20:00	Cuba	3–1	Poland	22–25	25–19	25–21	26–24		98–89	P2 Boxscore
18 Jul	16:30	Cuba	2–3	France	25–20	15–25	25–23	21–25	9–15	95–108	P2 Boxscore
18 Jul	20:00	China	0–3	Bulgaria	23–25	16–25	24–26			63–76	P2 Boxscore
19 Jul	17:00	Bulgaria	3–2	Poland	17–25	25–22	25–23	27–29	15–11	109–110	P2 Boxscore
19 Jul	20:30	Iran	0–3	France	24–26	16–25	24–26			64–77	P2 Boxscore
20 Jul	13:30	China	3–2	Cuba	20–25	25–23	15–25	25–22	19–17	104–112	P2 Boxscore
20 Jul	17:00	Bulgaria	0–3	Iran	17–25	17–25	16–25			50–75	P2 Boxscore
20 Jul	20:30	France	2–3	Poland	30–32	25–20	20–25	25–23	12–15	112–115	P2 Boxscore

==== Pool 8 ====
- All times are Central European Summer Time (UTC+02:00).

Date	Time		Score		Set 1	Set 2	Set 3	Set 4	Set 5	Total	Report
16 Jul	13:00	Ukraine	3–2	Netherlands	25–21	20–25	20–25	26–24	15–13	106–108	P2 Boxscore
16 Jul	16:30	Serbia	0–3	Italy	15–25	14–25	16–25			45–75	P2 Boxscore
16 Jul	20:30	Canada	1–3	Slovenia	25–21	21–25	19–25	21–25		86–96	P2 Boxscore
17 Jul	16:30	Ukraine	2–3	Italy	15–25	20–25	25–16	25–23	10–15	95–104	P2 Boxscore
17 Jul	20:30	Netherlands	0–3	Slovenia	18–25	19–25	21–25			58–75	P2 Boxscore
18 Jul	16:30	Ukraine	0–3	Serbia	22–25	19–25	17–25			58–75	P2 Boxscore
18 Jul	20:00	Netherlands	0–3	Canada	22–25	20–25	15–25			57–75	P2 Boxscore
19 Jul	16:30	Serbia	3–1	Canada	15–25	25–22	25–18	25–22		90–87	P2 Boxscore
19 Jul	20:30	Slovenia	0–3	Italy	22–25	20–25	23–25			65–75	P2 Boxscore
20 Jul	13:00	Ukraine	1–3	Canada	21–25	27–25	29–31	21–25		98–106	P2 Boxscore
20 Jul	16:30	Netherlands	0–3	Italy	13–25	22–25	19–25			54–75	P2 Boxscore
20 Jul	20:30	Serbia	2–3	Slovenia	21–25	25–23	25–23	18–25	15–17	104–113	P2 Boxscore

==== Pool 9 ====
- All times are Japan Standard Time (UTC+09:00).

Date	Time		Score		Set 1	Set 2	Set 3	Set 4	Set 5	Total	Report
16 Jul	12:00	Argentina	1–3	Brazil	21–25	23–25	26–24	18–25		88–99	P2 Boxscore
16 Jul	15:30	Turkey	0–3	United States	24–26	21–25	27–29			72–80	P2 Boxscore
16 Jul	19:20	Germany	1–3	Japan	25–21	20–25	23–25	20–25		88–96	P2 Boxscore
17 Jul	15:30	Turkey	3–1	Germany	29–27	25–22	18–25	30–28		102–102	P2 Boxscore
17 Jul	19:20	Argentina	2–3	Japan	25–23	25–23	21–25	23–25	13–15	107–111	P2 Boxscore
18 Jul	15:30	Argentina	1–3	United States	23–25	25–20	20–25	23–25		91–95	P2 Boxscore
18 Jul	19:20	Brazil	3–0	Japan	25–21	25–23	28–26			78–70	P2 Boxscore
19 Jul	15:30	Turkey	1–3	Brazil	22–25	24–26	25–22	22–25		93–98	P2 Boxscore
19 Jul	19:30	Germany	3–2	United States	25–22	22–25	17–25	25–15	15–12	104–99	P2 Boxscore
20 Jul	11:00	Turkey	2–3	Argentina	25–18	21–25	19–25	25–17	15–17	105–102	P2 Boxscore
20 Jul	14:30	Germany	1–3	Brazil	25–21	23–25	20–25	21–25		89–96	P2 Boxscore
20 Jul	19:20	United States	0–3	Japan	21–25	19–25	23–25			63–75	P2 Boxscore

== Final round ==
- All times are China Standard Time (UTC+08:00).

Quarter-finals
30 July
Brazil	3
China	1
31 July
Japan	0
Poland	3
30 July
Italy	3
Cuba	1
31 July
France	1
Slovenia	3

Semi-finals
2 August
Brazil	0
Poland	3
2 August
Italy	3
Slovenia	1

Final
3 August
Poland	3
Italy	0
Third place match
3 August
Brazil	3
Slovenia	1

=== Quarter-finals ===
Date	Time		Score		Set 1	Set 2	Set 3	Set 4	Set 5	Total	Report
30 Jul	15:00	Italy	3–1	Cuba	25–18	25–19	20–25	25–21		95–83	P2 Boxscore
30 Jul	19:00	Brazil	3–1	China	29–31	25–19	25–16	25–21		104–87	P2 Boxscore
31 Jul	15:00	France	1–3	Slovenia	22–25	25–15	19–25	18–25		84–90	P2 Boxscore
31 Jul	19:00	Japan	0–3	Poland	23–25	24–26	12–25			59–76	P2 Boxscore

=== Semi-finals ===
Date	Time		Score		Set 1	Set 2	Set 3	Set 4	Set 5	Total	Report
2 Aug	15:00	Italy	3–1	Slovenia	25–22	22–25	25–21	25–18		97–86	P2 Boxscore
2 Aug	19:00	Brazil	0–3	Poland	26–28	19–25	21–25			66–78	P2 Boxscore

=== Third place match ===
Date	Time		Score		Set 1	Set 2	Set 3	Set 4	Set 5	Total	Report
3 Aug	15:00	Brazil	3–1	Slovenia	23–25	25–20	25–23	25–19		98–87	P2 Boxscore

=== Final ===
Date	Time		Score		Set 1	Set 2	Set 3	Set 4	Set 5	Total	Report
3 Aug	19:00	Poland	3–0	Italy	25–22	25–19	25–14			75–55	P2 Boxscore

== Final standing ==
Rank	Team
1st place, gold medalist(s)	Poland
2nd place, silver medalist(s)	Italy
3rd place, bronze medalist(s)	Brazil
4	Slovenia
5	France
6	Japan
7	Cuba
8	China
9	Iran
10	Ukraine
11	Bulgaria
12	United States
13	Argentina
14	Canada
15	Germany
16	Serbia
17	Turkey
18	Netherlands

2025 Men's VNL champions

Poland
Second title

14–man roster
Jakub Popiwczak, Marcin Komenda, Wilfredo León, Bartosz Bednorz, Artur Szalpuk, Jakub Kochanowski (c), Kamil Semeniuk, Maksymilian Granieczny, Tomasz Fornal, Bartłomiej Bołądź, Szymon Jakubiszak, Kewin Sasak, Jakub Nowak, Jan Firlej
Head coach
Nikola Grbić

== Awards ==
- Most valuable player

(Poland) Jakub Kochanowski

- Best setter

(Italy) Simone Giannelli

- Best outside spikers

(Poland) Wilfredo León
(Italy) Alessandro Michieletto

- Best opposite spiker

(Poland) Kewin Sasak

- Best middle blockers

(Slovenia) Jan Kozamernik
(Poland) Jakub Kochanowski

- Best libero

(Brazil) Maique Nascimento

== Statistics leaders ==
=== Preliminary round ===
Statistics leaders correct at the end of preliminary round.

Best Scorers (Note: Best scorers determined by scored points from spike, block and serve.)
	Player	Attacks	Blocks	Serves	Total
1	(Cuba) Marlon Yant	200	22	15	237
2	(France) Théo Faure	194	10	21	225
3	(Germany) Filip John	186	7	17	210
4	(Bulgaria) Aleksandar Nikolov	177	15	16	208
5	(Ukraine) Dmytro Yanchuk	165	7	18	190

Best Attackers (Note: Best attackers determined by successful spikes.)
	Player	Spikes	Faults	Shots	%	Total
1	(Cuba) Marlon Yant	200	69	144	48.43	413
2	(France) Théo Faure	194	56	149	48.62	399
3	(Germany) Filip John	186	57	133	49.47	376
4	(Bulgaria) Aleksandar Nikolov	177	54	124	49.86	355
5	(Ukraine) Dmytro Yanchuk	165	51	133	47.28	349

Best Blockers (Note: Best blockers determined by the stuff blocks, faults and rebounds.)
	Player	Blocks	Faults	Rebounds	Avg	Total
1	(Ukraine) Yurii Semeniuk	37	55	47	3.08	139
2	(Serbia) Aleksandar Nedeljković	35	66	54	2.92	155
3	(Argentina) Agustín Loser	34	54	59	2.83	147
4	(Cuba) Javier Concepción	31	55	38	2.58	124
5	(France) François Huetz	28	45	54	2.33	127

Best Servers (Note: Best servers determined by aces, faults and hits.)
	Player	Aces	Faults	Hits	Avg	Total
1	(Turkey) Ramazan Efe Mandıracı	26	28	110	2.17	164
2	(France) Théo Faure	21	49	170	1.75	240
3	(Ukraine) Dmytro Yanchuk	18	39	121	1.50	178
3	(Iran) Morteza Sharifi	18	33	85	1.80	136
3	(Italy) Alessandro Michieletto	18	27	91	2.25	136

Best Setters (Note: Best setters determined by running setts, faults and still sets.)
	Player	Running	Faults	Still	Avg	Total
1	(Brazil) Fernando Kreling	392	2	478	32.67	872
2	(Argentina) Matías Sánchez	346	5	556	28.83	907
3	(Turkey) Murat Yenipazar	290	0	632	24.17	922
4	(Italy) Simone Giannelli	266	4	459	22.17	729
4	(Iran) Arshia Behnezhad	266	6	447	22.17	719

Best Diggers (Note: Best diggers determined by successful digs, faults and receptions.)
	Player	Digs	Faults	Receptions	Avg	Total
1	(Brazil) Maique Nascimento	101	56	61	8.42	218
2	(Ukraine) Oleksandr Boiko	85	55	41	7.08	181
3	(Japan) Tomohiro Ogawa	80	28	66	6.67	174
4	(Turkey) Berkay Bayraktar	78	35	41	6.50	154
5	(Netherlands) Tom Koops	75	23	41	6.25	139
5	(Germany) Leonard Graven	75	38	36	6.25	149

Best Receivers (Note: Best receivers determined by efficient receptions, faults and serve receptions.)
	Player	Excellents	Faults	Serve	%	Total
1	(Netherlands) Tom Koops	106	17	211	31.74	334
2	(Brazil) Maique Nascimento	76	13	149	31.93	238
3	(Germany) Leonard Graven	73	12	140	32.44	225
4	(Ukraine) Oleksandr Boiko	68	12	185	25.66	265
5	(Netherlands) Jeffrey Klok	66	16	162	27.05	244

=== Final round ===
Statistics leaders correct at the end of final round.

Best Scorers
	Player	Attacks	Blocks	Serves	Total
1	(Italy) Alessandro Michieletto	37	6	7	50
2	(Brazil) Alan Souza	40	4	2	46
3	(Slovenia) Rok Možič	37	6	0	43
4	(Poland) Kewin Sasak	29	6	4	39
5	(Slovenia) Tonček Štern	35	1	0	36

Best Attackers
	Player	Spikes	Faults	Shots	%	Total
1	(Brazil) Alan Souza	40	13	26	50.63	79
2	(Italy) Alessandro Michieletto	37	10	33	46.25	80
2	(Slovenia) Rok Možič	37	13	32	45.12	82
4	(Slovenia) Tonček Štern	35	13	23	49.30	71
5	(Poland) Kewin Sasak	29	4	17	58.00	50

Best Blockers
	Player	Blocks	Faults	Rebounds	Avg	Total
1	(Slovenia) Jan Kozamernik	8	9	15	2.67	32
2	(Brazil) Matheus Santos	7	9	11	2.33	27
2	(Poland) Jakub Kochanowski	7	6	6	2.33	19
4	(Poland) Marcin Komenda	6	3	8	2.00	17
4	(Poland) Kewin Sasak	6	4	8	2.00	18
4	(Italy) Alessandro Michieletto	6	4	6	2.00	16
4	(Slovenia) Uroš Planinšič	6	4	5	2.00	15
4	(Slovenia) Rok Možič	6	14	10	2.00	30

Best Servers
	Player	Aces	Faults	Hits	Avg	Total
1	(Italy) Alessandro Michieletto	7	8	30	2.33	45
2	(Brazil) Matheus Santos	5	8	29	1.67	42
2	(Brazil) Fernando Kreling	5	5	40	1.67	50
4	(Poland) Kewin Sasak	4	8	30	1.33	42
4	(Italy) Simone Giannelli	4	9	40	1.33	53
4	(Italy) Kamil Rychlicki	4	9	16	1.33	29

Best Setters
	Player	Running	Faults	Still	Avg	Total
1	(Brazil) Fernando Kreling	115	1	133	38.33	249
2	(Slovenia) Uroš Planinšič	86	0	138	28.67	224
3	(Italy) Simone Giannelli	84	0	137	28.00	221
4	(Poland) Marcin Komenda	63	1	108	21.00	172
5	(France) Antoine Brizard	33	0	43	33.00	76

Best Diggers
	Player	Digs	Faults	Receptions	Avg	Total
1	(Brazil) Alan Souza	20	4	3	6.67	27
2	(Poland) Jakub Popiwczak	19	5	10	6.33	34
3	(Brazil) Maique Nascimento	18	4	9	6.00	31
3	(Italy) Daniele Lavia	18	6	5	6.00	29
3	(Slovenia) Jani Kovačič	18	22	11	6.00	51

Best Receivers
	Player	Excellents	Faults	Serve	%	Total
1	(Italy) Fabio Balaso	22	2	47	30.99	71
2	(Slovenia) Jani Kovačič	19	2	41	30.65	62
3	(Brazil) Ricardo Lucarelli	14	2	33	28.57	49
3	(Italy) Daniele Lavia	14	4	45	22.22	63
5	(Poland) Tomasz Fornal	13	2	13	46.43	28
5	(Slovenia) Žiga Štern	13	10	43	19.70	66

== See also ==
- 2025 FIVB Men's Volleyball World Championship
- 2025 FIVB Volleyball Men's U21 World Championship
- 2025 FIVB Volleyball Boys' U19 World Championship
