= Daenan Gyimah =

Canadian volleyball player (born 1998)

Personal information
- Nickname: Kofi
- Born: 16 January 1998 (age 28); Scarborough, Ontario, Canada
- Height: 2.00 m (6 ft 7 in)
- Weight: 90 kg (198 lb)
- Spike: 390 cm (12 ft 10 in)
- Block: 339 cm (11 ft 1 in)
- Education: UCLA

Volleyball information
- Position: Middle blocker
- Current club: LKPS Lublin
- Number: 16

Career
Years	Teams
2016–2020; 2023–2024; 2024–2025; 2025–	UCLA Bruins; Hurrikaani Loimaa; Arago de Sète; LKPS Lublin

National team
2016–2017; 2019–	Canada U21; Canada

Daenan "Kofi" Gyimah (born 16 January 1998) is a Canadian professional volleyball player who plays as a middle blocker for LKPS Lublin and the Canada national team.

== Career ==
=== Club ===
Gyimah attended the University of California, Los Angeles, playing for the UCLA Bruins from 2016 to 2020. In 2018, he helped the Bruins to the NCAA national final, and was named to the all-tournament team.

After a three-year hiatus from volleyball, Gyimah joined Finnish professional club Hurrikaani Loimaa in December 2023. For the 2024–2025 season, Gyimah played with Arago de Sète in the French Ligue A.

In 2025, Gyimah signed for Polish club LKPS Lublin.

=== National team ===
Gyimah played for the U21 national team in 2016 and 2017.

He was first named to the Senior national team in 2019 for Volleyball Nations League. Following a hiatus from volleyball, Gyimah rejoined the national team in 2024.

In 2025, Gyimah represented Canada at the 2025 FIVB World Championship.

== Personal life ==
Gyimah was born and raised in Scarborough to a Ghanaian father and Canadian mother. Gyimah started playing volleyball in grade nine after watching his older sister, Aja, play.

Gyimah has also pursued a musical career as a rapper, singer, and producer under his stage name Kofi. He signed a music contract with Red Bull Records in 2020 and took a break from volleyball to focus on his music career.

== Honours ==
=== College ===
- 2017–18 NCAA Men's Volleyball Tournament, with UCLA Bruins

=== Club ===
- Domestic
  - 2025–26 Polish SuperCup, with Bogdanka LUK Lublin
  - 2025–26 Polish Cup, with Bogdanka LUK Lublin
  - 2026–27 Polish SuperCup, with Bogdanka LUK Lublin
