= Stéphane Antiga =

French volleyball player and coach (born 1976)

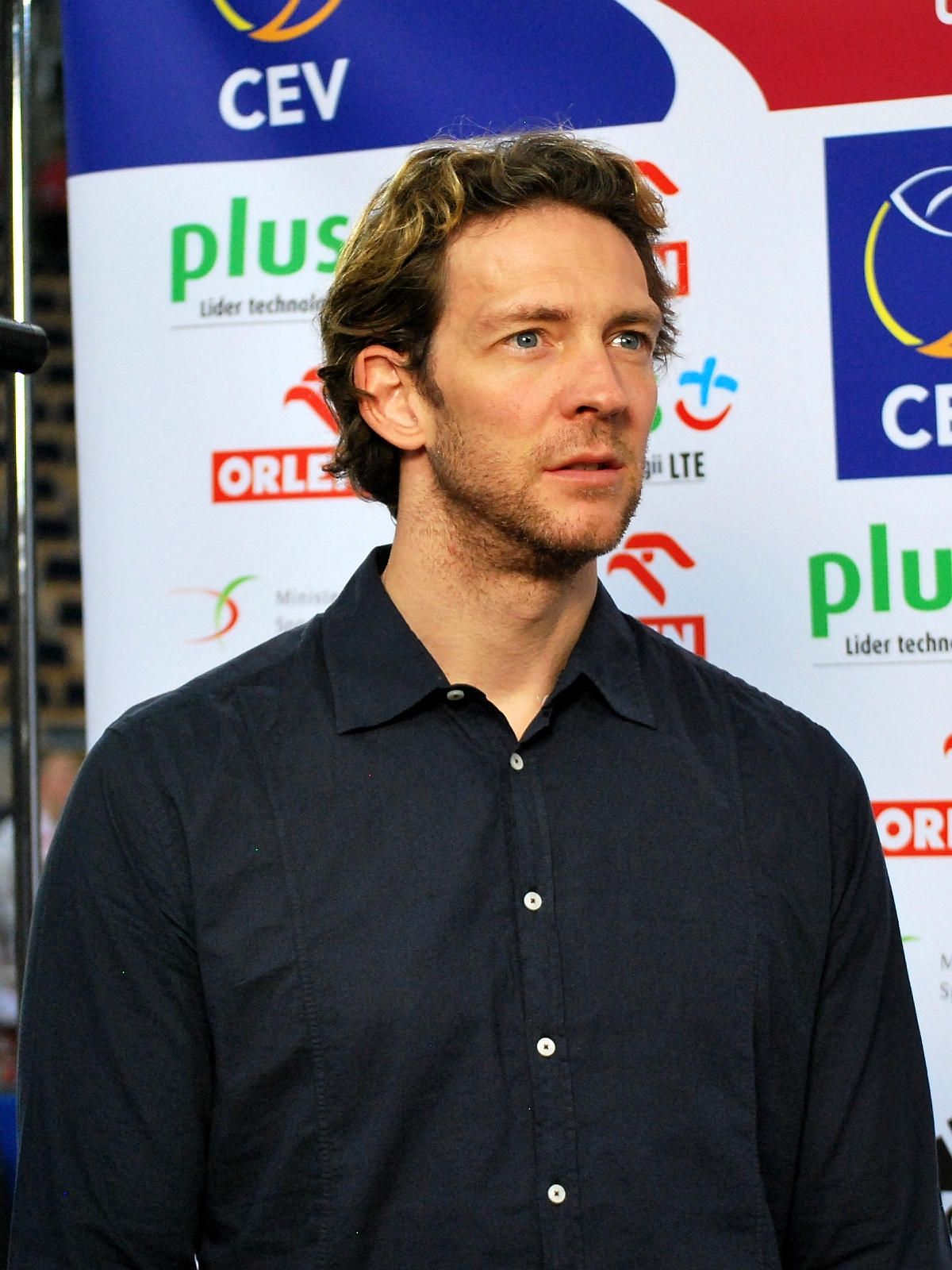

Personal information
- Born: 3 February 1976 (age 50); Suresnes, France
- Height: 2.00 m (6 ft 7 in)

Coaching information
- Current team: LUK Lublin
Previous teams coached
Years	Teams
2014–2016; 2017–2018; 2017–2019; 2019–2024; 2024; 2025; 2025–	Poland; Canada; Onico Warsaw; Developres Rzeszów; Pallavolo Scandicci; Developres Rzeszów; LUK Lublin

Volleyball information
- Position: Outside hitter

Career
Years	Teams
1994–1998; 1998–2003; 2003–2004; 2004–2007; 2007–2011; 2011–2013; 2013–2014	Paris UC; Paris Volley; Noicom Brebanca Cuneo; CV Pòrtol; Skra Bełchatów; Delecta Bydgoszcz; Skra Bełchatów

National team
1998–2010	France (306)
Honours
Men's volleyball
Representing France
FIVB World Championship
Bronze medal – third place	2002 Argentina
FIVB World League
Silver medal – second place	2006 Moscow
CEV European Championship
Silver medal – second place	2003 Germany
Silver medal – second place	2009 Turkey
Head coach Poland
FIVB World Championship
Gold medal – first place	2014 Poland
FIVB World Cup
Bronze medal – third place	2015 Japan
Head coach Canada
FIVB World League
Bronze medal – third place	2017 Curitiba

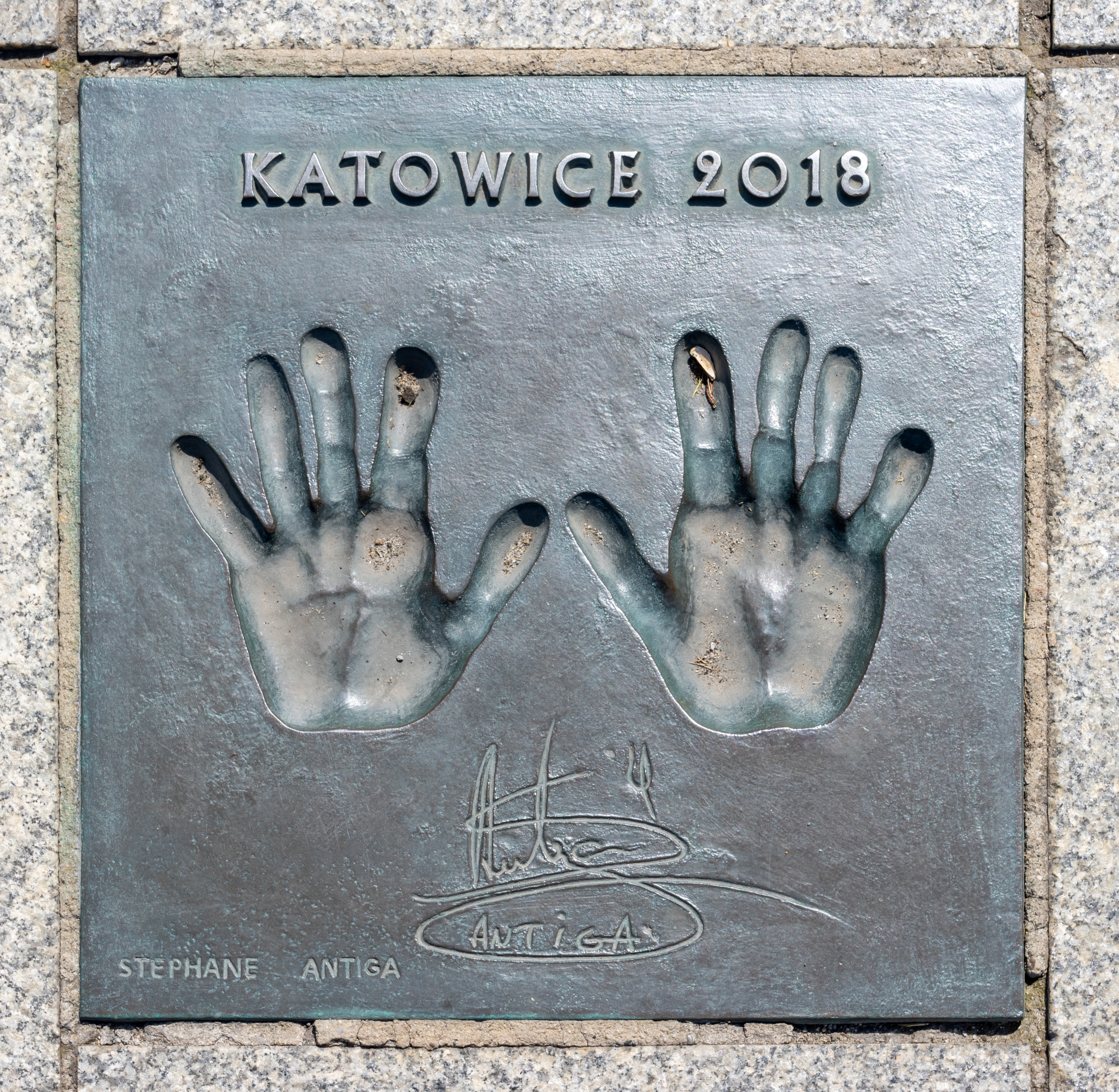
Hand prints and signature at the Avenue of Volleyball Stars, Katowice

Stéphane Antiga (born 3 February 1976) is a French professional volleyball coach and former player. He was a member of the France national team from 1998 to 2010, and a participant in the Olympic Games Athens 2004. He serves as head coach for the Polish Tauron Liga team, LUK Lublin.

== Personal life ==
Antiga was born in Suresnes, Hauts-de-Seine, France. He has a wife Stephanie. They have two children – a son Timothy and a daughter Manoline.

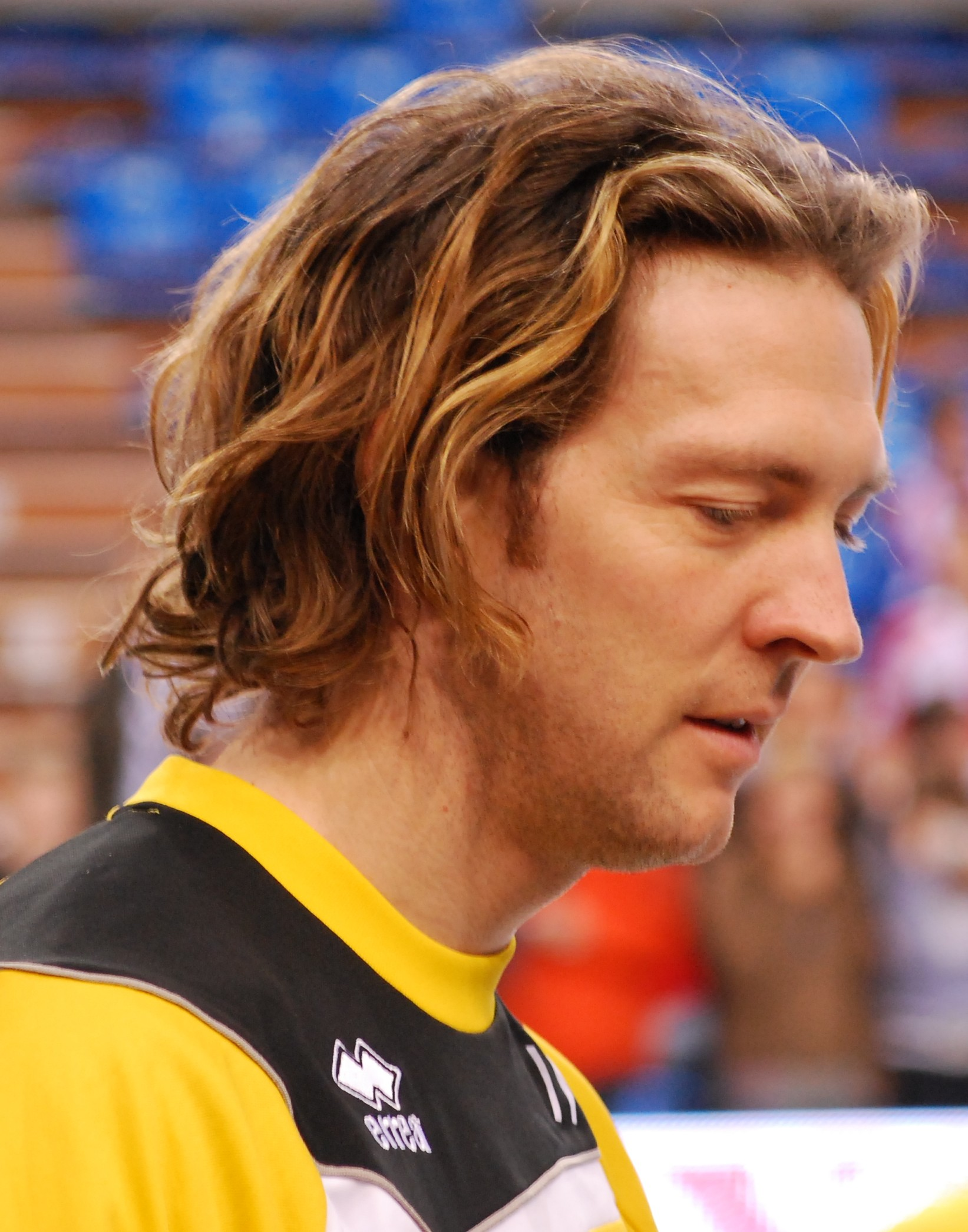
As PGE Skra Bełchatów player, 2009–10 PlusLiga season.

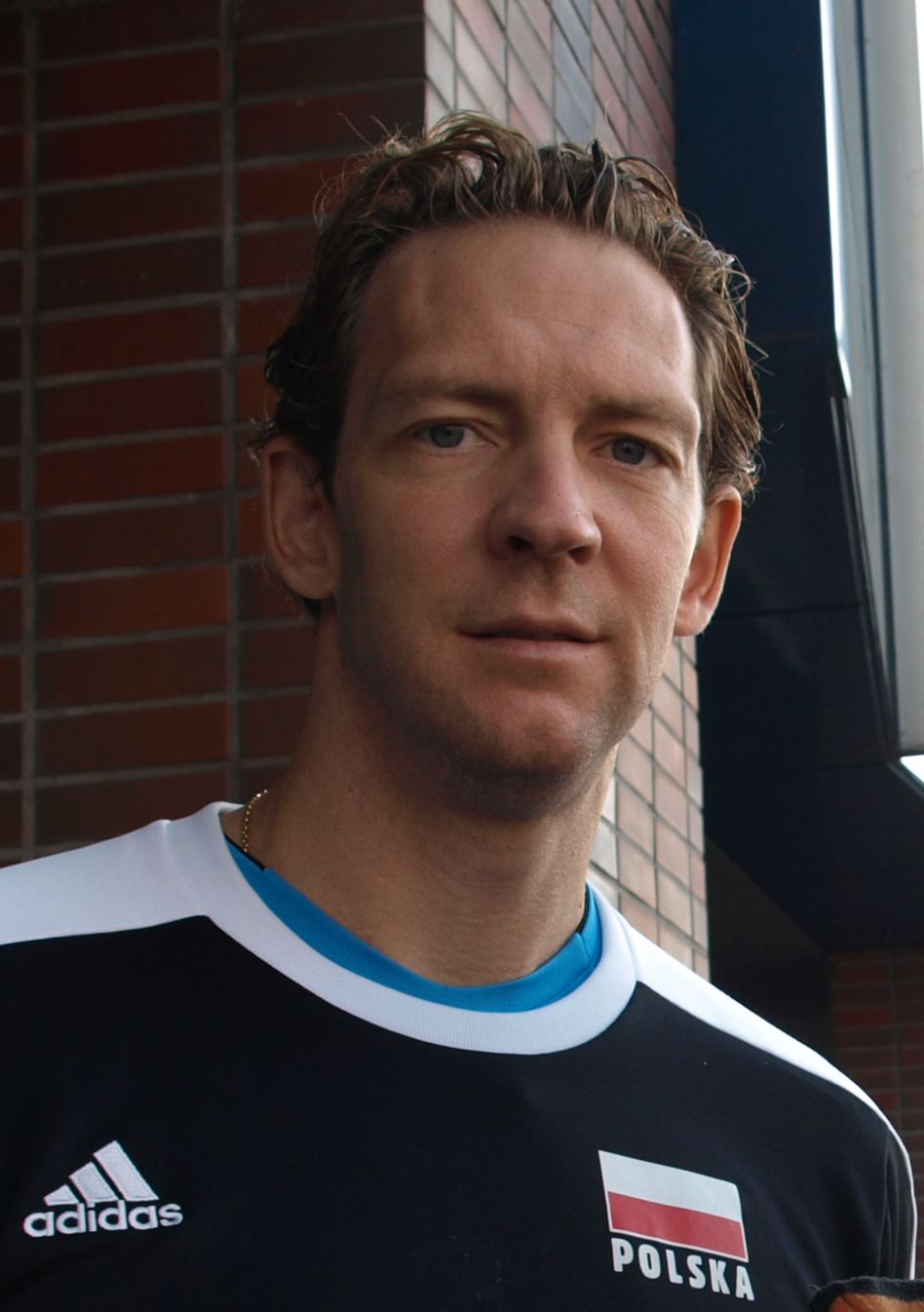
Antiga as Poland's head coach during the 2014 World Championship.

== Career as player ==
=== Club ===
In his career he has played for the teams of Paris UC (France), Paris Volley, Bre Banca Lannutti Cuneo, Portol Palma de Mallorca, Skra Bełchatów and Delecta Bydgoszcz. In April 2013, he signed a contract to return to PGE Skra Bełchatów. After winning gold medal of 2014 Polish Championship with club from Bełchatów he ended his career as a player.

=== National team ===
He is silver medalist of European Championship from Germany 2003 and Turkey 2009, bronze medalist of World Championship 2002. Antiga played 306 games with the French national team and was previously captain of the team.

== Career as coach ==
On 24 October 2013 it was announced that Antiga had been appointed as the new head coach of the Poland men's national volleyball team in a three-year contract, replacing Andrea Anastasi. His deputy will be Philippe Blain. Antiga was a player of PGE Skra Bełchatów until the end of the 2013/2014 season. On 21 September 2014 he won his first medal as a coach – Poland won a title of World Champion 2014. On 27 October 2014 he received a state award granted by the Polish President Bronisław Komorowski – Knight's Cross of the Order of Merit of the Republic of Poland for outstanding contribution to the development of Polish sport, for achievements in training. On 10 December 2014 Antiga and Blain were honored by the Ambassador of France in Poland medals Officers Ordre du Mérite sportif. Historic result at World Championship brought the team their next title of the Best Team of 2014 in 80th Plebiscyt Przeglądu Sportowego 2014 in Poland. Head coach Antiga was awarded a title of the Coach of the year 2014 ex-aequo with Łukasz Kruczek. In 2017 Antiga was named a new head coach of Canada men's national volleyball team In 2017 he also was named a new head coach of Polish club ONICO Warszawa.

== Honours ==
=== As a player ===
- CEV Champions League
  - 2000–01 – with Paris Volley
- FIVB Club World Championship
  - Doha 2009 – with PGE Skra Bełchatów
  - Doha 2010 – with PGE Skra Bełchatów
- CEV Cup
  - 1999–2000 – with Paris Volley
  - 2005–06 – with Portol Palma de Mallorca
- CEV Challenge Cup
  - 2004–05 – with Portol Palma de Mallorca
- Domestic
  - 1995–96 French Championship, with Paris UC
  - 1996–97 French Cup, with Paris UC
  - 1996–97 French Championship, with Paris UC
  - 1997–98 French Championship, with Paris UC
  - 1998–99 French Cup, with Paris Volley
  - 1999–2000 French Cup, with Paris Volley
  - 1999–2000 French Championship, with Paris Volley
  - 2000–01 French Cup, with Paris Volley
  - 2000–01 French Championship, with Paris Volley
  - 2001–02 French Championship, with Paris Volley
  - 2002–03 French Championship, with Paris Volley
  - 2004–05 Spanish SuperCup, with Portol Palma de Mallorca
  - 2004–05 Spanish Cup, with Portol Palma de Mallorca
  - 2005–06 Spanish Cup, with Portol Palma de Mallorca
  - 2005–06 Spanish Championship, with Portol Palma de Mallorca
  - 2006–07 Spanish Championship, with Portol Palma de Mallorca
  - 2007–08 Polish Championship, with PGE Skra Bełchatów
  - 2008–09 Polish Cup, with PGE Skra Bełchatów
  - 2008–09 Polish Championship, with PGE Skra Bełchatów
  - 2009–10 Polish Championship, with PGE Skra Bełchatów
  - 2010–11 Polish Cup, with PGE Skra Bełchatów
  - 2010–11 Polish Championship, with PGE Skra Bełchatów
  - 2013–14 Polish Championship, with PGE Skra Bełchatów

=== As a coach ===
- Domestic
  - 2018–19 Polish Championship, with Onico Warsaw
  - 2021–22 Polish SuperCup, with Developres Rzeszów
  - 2021–22 Polish Cup, with Developres Rzeszów
  - 2022–23 Polish SuperCup, with Developres Rzeszów
  - 2024–25 Polish Championship, with Developres Rzeszów
  - 2025–26 Polish SuperCup, with Bogdanka LUK Lublin
  - 2025–26 Polish Cup, with Bogdanka LUK Lublin
  - 2026–27 Polish SuperCup, with Bogdanka LUK Lublin

=== Individual awards ===
- 2009: CEV European Championship – Best receiver

=== State awards ===
- 2014: Knight's Cross of the Order of Merit of the Republic of Poland
- 2014: Médaille d’or de la jeunesse, des sports et de l’engagement associatif

Awards
Preceded by (Russia) Pavel Abramov	Best Receiver of CEV European Championship; 2009	Succeeded by (Serbia) Nikola Kovačević
Sporting positions
Preceded by (Italy) Andrea Anastasi	Head coach of Poland; 2014–2016	Succeeded by (Italy) Ferdinando De Giorgi
