= LKPS Lublin =

Polish volleyball club

Bogdanka LUK Lublin
- Full name: Lubelski Klub Przyjaciół Siatkówki Lublin
- Founded: 2013; 13 years ago
- Ground: Hala Globus (Capacity: 4,221)
- Chairman: Krzysztof Skubiszewski
- Manager: Stéphane Antiga
- Captain: Marcin Komenda
- League: Tauron Liga
- 2025–26: 2nd place
- Website: Club home page

Uniforms
Home	Away

LKPS Lublin, officially known for sponsorship reasons as Bogdanka LUK Lublin, is a professional men's volleyball club based in Lublin in eastern Poland, founded in 2013. The club has been promoted to the top flight of Polish volleyball, Tauron Liga (then – PlusLiga) in 2021.

== Honours ==
=== Domestic ===
- Polish Championship

Winners (1): 2024–25

- Polish Cup

Winners (1): 2025–26

- Polish SuperCup

Winners (2): 2025–26, 2026–27

=== International ===
- CEV Challenge Cup

Winners (1): 2024–25

== Club history ==
The foundation of the club took place on 26 August 2013 in the city of Lublin as a sports association under the name LKPS Lublin. Lublin began its history in the 3rd Polish Volleyball League, playing there from the club foundation in 2013 until 2015.

From 2015 to 2019, Lublin was playing in the 2nd Polish Volleyball League. In 2019, the team coached by Maciej Kołodziejczyk finished the league in 2nd place, and won promotion to the 1st Polish Volleyball League.

In 2021, acting as LUK Politechnika Lublin, the team won the league and therefore gained the possibility to play in the upcoming PlusLiga season.

== Team ==
As of 2026–27 season

No.	Name	Date of birth	Position
1	(France) Moussé Gueye	11 November 1996 (age 29)	middle blocker
4	(Poland) Marcin Komenda	24 May 1996 (age 30)	setter
5	(Poland) Mikołaj Sawicki	23 November 1999 (age 26)	outside hitter
6	(Poland) Mateusz Malinowski	6 May 1992 (age 34)	opposite
7	(Poland) Jakub Wachnik	16 February 1993 (age 33)	outside hitter
8	(Poland) Paweł Rusin	5 March 1992 (age 34)	outside hitter
9	(Poland) Wilfredo León	31 July 1993 (age 33)	outside hitter
10	(Japan) Tomohiro Ogawa	4 July 1996 (age 30)	libero
11	(Bulgaria) Aleks Grozdanov	28 March 1998 (age 28)	middle blocker
12	(Japan) Ran Takahashi	2 September 2001 (age 25)	outside hitter
16	(Canada) Daenan Gyimah	15 January 1998 (age 28)	middle blocker
20	(Poland) Maciej Zając	5 March 2003 (age 23)	middle blocker
24	(Poland) Rafał Prokopczuk	23 March 1999 (age 27)	setter
35	(Poland) Kewin Sasak	20 February 1997 (age 29)	opposite
Head coach:		(France) Stéphane Antiga	

== Season by season ==
Season	Tier	League	Pos.
2021–22	1	PlusLiga	11
2022–23	1	PlusLiga	10
2023–24	1	PlusLiga	5
2024–25	1	PlusLiga	1st place, gold medalist(s)
2025–26	1	PlusLiga	2

== Former names ==
Years	Name
2013–2014	LKPS Lublin
2014–2016	LKPS Pszczółka Lublin
2016–2017	LKPS Politechnika Pszczółka Lublin
2017–2018	LKPS Politechnika Lublin
2018–2021	LUK Politechnika Lublin
2021–2023	LUK Lublin
2023–present	Bogdanka LUK Lublin

== See also ==
- LKPS Lublin players
- LKPS Lublin coaches
