= Jakub Popiwczak =

Polish volleyball player (born 1996)

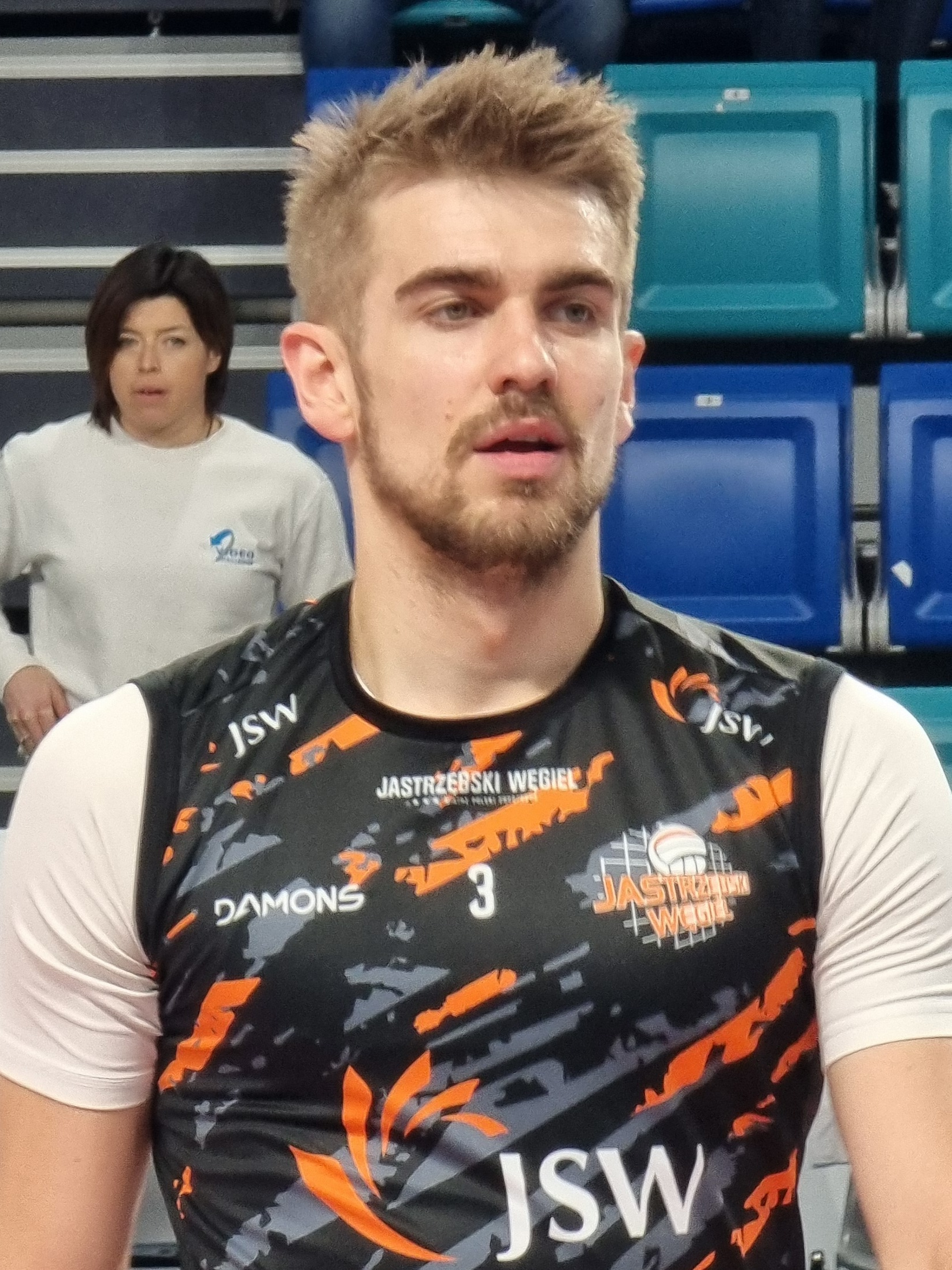
- Popiwczak in 2024

Personal information
- Born: 17 April 1996 (age 30); Legnica, Poland
- Height: 1.80 m (5 ft 11 in)
- Weight: 78 kg (172 lb)

Volleyball information
- Position: Libero
- Current club: Warta Zawiercie
- Number: 10

Career
| Years | Teams |
|---|---|
| 2012–2025; 2025– | Jastrzębski Węgiel; Warta Zawiercie |

National team
| 2019– | Poland |
Honours
Men's volleyball
Representing Poland
FIVB World Championship
| Silver medal – second place | 2022 Poland/Slovenia |
| Bronze medal – third place | 2025 Philippines |
FIVB Nations League
| Gold medal – first place | 2023 Gdańsk |
| Gold medal – first place | 2025 Ningbo |
| Gold medal – first place | 2026 Ningbo |
| Bronze medal – third place | 2019 Chicago |
| Bronze medal – third place | 2022 Bologna |
| Bronze medal – third place | 2024 Łódź |
CEV European Championship
| Gold medal – first place | 2023 Italy/Bulgaria/North Macedonia/Israel |
| Gold medal – first place | 2026 Italy/Bulgaria/Finland/Romania |

Jakub Popiwczak (born 17 April 1996) is a Polish professional volleyball player who plays as a libero for Aluron CMC Warta Zawiercie and the Poland national team. Popiwczak won a silver medal at the 2022 World Championship.

== Career ==
In 2012, he joined Jastrzębski Węgiel and made his debut in the Polish PlusLiga. A year later, his club finished third in the league. During the 2013–14 CEV Champions League, Popiwczak with his teammates beat Zenit Kazan in a match for third place and won the bronze medals. In 2014, he won his second bronze medal in the PlusLiga.

== Honours ==
=== Club ===
- CEV Champions League
  - 2022–23 – with Jastrzębski Węgiel
  - 2023–24 – with Jastrzębski Węgiel
  - 2025–26 – with Aluron CMC Warta Zawiercie
- Domestic
  - 2020–21 Polish Championship, with Jastrzębski Węgiel
  - 2021–22 Polish SuperCup, with Jastrzębski Węgiel
  - 2022–23 Polish SuperCup, with Jastrzębski Węgiel
  - 2022–23 Polish Championship, with Jastrzębski Węgiel
  - 2023–24 Polish Championship, with Jastrzębski Węgiel
  - 2024–25 Polish Cup, with Jastrzębski Węgiel
  - 2025–26 Polish Championship, with Aluron CMC Warta Zawiercie

=== Individual awards ===
- 2026: CEV European Championship – Best libero

=== Statistics ===
- 2021–22 PlusLiga – Best receiver
