= Mateusz Malinowski =

Polish volleyball player (born 1992)

Personal information
- Born: 6 May 1992 (age 34); Piła, Poland
- Height: 1.98 m (6 ft 6 in)
- Weight: 93 kg (205 lb)
- Spike: 349 cm (137 in)

Volleyball information
- Position: Opposite
- Current club: LUK Lublin
- Number: 6

Career
Years	Teams
2011–2015; 2015–2017; 2017–2018; 2018–2022; 2022–	Jastrzębski Węgiel; Cuprum Lubin; Espadon Szczecin; Warta Zawiercie; LUK Lublin

Mateusz Malinowski (born 6 May 1992) is a Polish professional volleyball player who plays as an opposite spiker for LUK Lublin.

== Career ==
=== Club ===
In 2011, Malinowski joined Jastrzębski Węgiel. In the same year, he won a silver medal of the Club World Championship. In 2013, Malinowski won a bronze medal of the Polish Championship. During the 2013/2014 season, the team was promoted to the Final Four of the 2013–14 CEV Champions League held in Ankara, and after defeating Zenit Kazan in a third place match, won a bronze medal. Malinowski ended the 2013–14 PlusLiga season with his second bronze medal of the Polish Championship. In 2015, he moved to Cuprum Lubin.

== Honours ==
=== Club ===
- FIVB Club World Championship
  - Doha 2011 – with Jastrzębski Węgiel
- CEV Challenge Cup
  - 2024–25 – with Bogdanka LUK Lublin
- Domestic
  - 2024–25 Polish Championship, with Bogdanka LUK Lublin
  - 2025–26 Polish SuperCup, with Bogdanka LUK Lublin
  - 2025–26 Polish Cup, with Bogdanka LUK Lublin
  - 2026–27 Polish SuperCup, with Bogdanka LUK Lublin
