= Moussé Gueye =

French volleyball player (born 1996)

- Gueye (#1) in 2025

Personal information
- Nationality: French
- Born: 11 November 1996 (age 29); Dakar, Senegal
- Height: 1.98 m (6 ft 6 in)
- Weight: 87 kg (192 lb)
- Spike: 365 cm (144 in)
- Block: 325 cm (128 in)

Volleyball information
- Position: Middle blocker
- Current club: Bogdanka LUK Lublin
- Number: 1

Career
Years	Teams
2014–2015; 2015–2018; 2018–2019; 2019; 2019–2021; 2021–2022; 2022–2023; 2023–2024; 2024–2025; 2025–2026; 2026–	LISSP Calais; Mende Volley Lozère; Saint-Quentin Volley; Cambrai Volley; Narbonne Volley; Chaumont VB 52; Nantes Rezé MV; Barkom-Kazhany Lviv; Gas Sales Piacenza; Barkom-Kazhany Lviv; Bogdanka LUK Lublin

National team
2021–	France
Honours
Men's volleyball
Representing France
FIVB Nations League
Bronze medal – third place	2021 Rimini
CEV European Championship
Silver medal – second place	2026 Bulgaria/Finland/Italy/Romania

Moussé Gueye (born 11 November 1996) is a French professional volleyball player who plays as a middle blocker for Bogdanka LUK Lublin and the France national team.

== Career ==
=== National team ===
Gueye made his debut in the senior national team in 2021.

Initially not selected for the first phase of the 2022 Nations League, Moussé Gueye took the place of Daryl Bultor, who was sidelined with a back injury. However, he did not take part in the final round of the competition.

== Honours ==
=== Club ===
- Domestic
  - 2021–22 French SuperCup, with Chaumont VB 52
  - 2021–22 French Cup, with Chaumont VB 52
  - 2026–27 Polish SuperCup, with Bogdanka LUK Lublin
