= Mikołaj Sawicki =

Polish volleyball player (born 1999)

- Sawicki in 2024

Personal information
- Born: 23 November 1996 (age 29); Piotrków Trybunalski, Poland
- Height: 1.98 m (6 ft 6 in)
- Weight: 108 kg (238 lb)
- Spike: 352 cm (139 in)

Volleyball information
- Position: Outside hitter
- Current club: Bogdanka LUK Lublin
- Number: 5

Career
Years	Teams
2018–2019; 2019–2020; 2020–2022; 2022–2024; 2024–	BBTS Bielsko-Biała; KPS Siedlce; Skra Bełchatów; Trefl Gdańsk; Bogdanka LUK Lublin

National team
2023–	Poland

Mikołaj Sawicki (born 23 November 1999) is a Polish professional volleyball player who plays as an outside hitter for Bogdanka LUK Lublin and the Poland national team.

== Career ==
In early May 2025, Sawicki underwent an anti-doping test following the second match of the 2024–25 PlusLiga finals, where his team, Bogdanka LUK Lublin, faced Aluron CMC Warta Zawiercie. On 30 May, he was charged with an anti-doping rule violation, handed a provisional suspension, and subjected to disciplinary proceedings. Consequently, he left the national team's training camp, to which he had been called up by Nikola Grbić.

On 2 March 2026, the Polish Anti-Doping Agency announced that Sawicki could resume training with his club and return to the court, as a possible error had occurred during the analysis of his sample at the Polish Anti-Doping Laboratory (PLAD).

== Honours ==
=== Club ===
- CEV Challenge Cup
  - 2024–25 – with Bogdanka LUK Lublin
- Domestic
  - 2024–25 Polish Championship, with Bogdanka LUK Lublin
  - 2026–27 Polish SuperCup, with Bogdanka LUK Lublin

== Personal life ==
Sawicki's wife is Klaudia Karch, whom he married on 30 May 2024.
