= Kewin Sasak =

Polish volleyball player (born 1997)

Personal information
- Born: 20 February 1997 (age 29); Dębica, Poland
- Height: 2.08 m (6 ft 10 in)

Volleyball information
- Position: Opposite hitter
- Current club: LUK Lublin
- Number: 35

Career
Years	Teams
2016–2017; 2017–2018; 2018–2022; 2022–2023; 2023–2024; 2024–	BAS Białystok; Ślepsk Suwałki; Trefl Gdańsk; VK Karlovarsko; Trefl Gdańsk; LUK Lublin

National team
2025–	Poland
Honours
Men's volleyball
Representing Poland
FIVB World Championship
Bronze medal – third place	2025 Philippines
FIVB Nations League
Gold medal – first place	2025 Ningbo
Gold medal – first place	2026 Ningbo
CEV European Championship
Gold medal – first place	2026 Bulgaria/Finland/Italy/Romania

Kewin Sasak (born 20 February 1997) is a Polish professional volleyball player who plays as an opposite hitter for Bogdanka LUK Lublin and the Poland national team.

== Honours ==
=== Club ===
- CEV Challenge Cup
  - 2024–25 – with Bogdanka LUK Lublin
- Domestic
  - 2022–23 Czech SuperCup, with ČEZ Karlovarsko
  - 2024–25 Polish Championship, with Bogdanka LUK Lublin
  - 2025–26 Polish SuperCup, with Bogdanka LUK Lublin
  - 2025–26 Polish Cup, with Bogdanka LUK Lublin
  - 2026–27 Polish SuperCup, with Bogdanka LUK Lublin

=== World University Games ===
- 2021 Summer World University Games

=== Individual awards ===
- 2025: FIVB Nations League – Best opposite spiker
- 2026: Polish Cup – Most valuable player
- 2026: Polish Cup – Best opposite spiker
