= Marcin Komenda =

Polish volleyball player (born 1996)

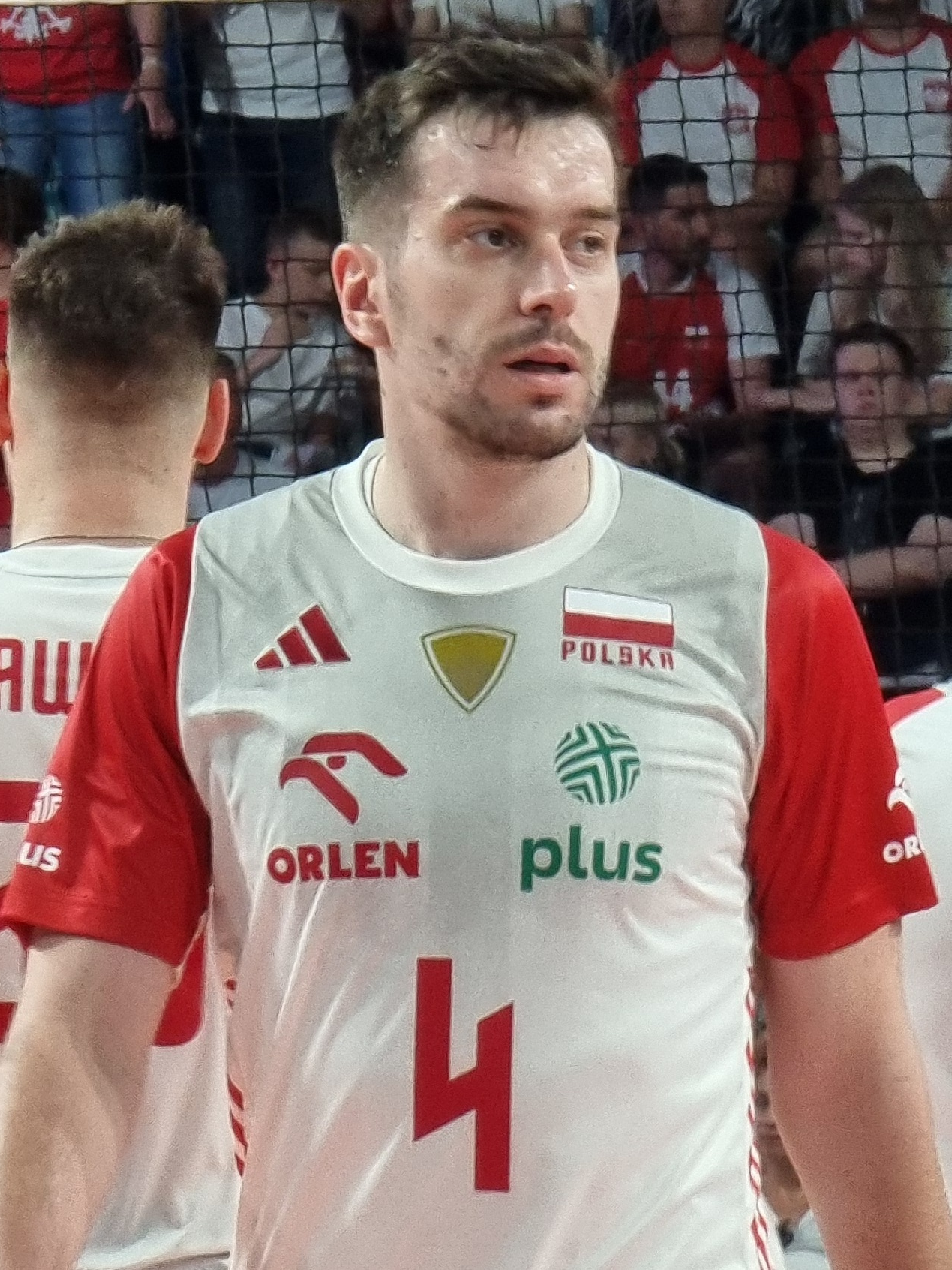
- Marcin Komenda in 2024

Personal information
- Born: 24 May 1996 (age 30); Kraków, Poland
- Height: 1.98 m (6 ft 6 in)
- Weight: 92 kg (203 lb)
- Spike: 345 cm (136 in)

Volleyball information
- Position: Setter
- Current club: LUK Lublin
- Number: 4

Career
Years	Teams
2015–2017; 2017–2019; 2019–2020; 2020–2022; 2022–	Effector Kielce; GKS Katowice; Asseco Resovia; Stal Nysa; LUK Lublin

National team
2019–	Poland
Honours
Men's volleyball
Representing Poland
FIVB World Championship
Bronze medal – third place	2025 Philippines
FIVB World Cup
Silver medal – second place	2019 Japan
FIVB Nations League
Gold medal – first place	2025 Ningbo
Gold medal – first place	2026 Ningbo
Silver medal – second place	2021 Rimini
Bronze medal – third place	2019 Chicago
Bronze medal – third place	2024 Łódź
CEV European Championship
Gold medal – first place	2026 Bulgaria/Finland/Italy/Romania
Bronze medal – third place	2019 Belgium/France/Netherlands/Slovenia

Marcin Komenda (born 24 May 1996) is a Polish professional volleyball player who plays as a setter for LUK Lublin, which he captains, and the Poland national team.

== Honours ==
=== Club ===
- CEV Challenge Cup
  - 2024–25 – with Bogdanka LUK Lublin
- Domestic
  - 2024–25 Polish Championship, with Bogdanka LUK Lublin
  - 2025–26 Polish SuperCup, with Bogdanka LUK Lublin
  - 2025–26 Polish Cup, with Bogdanka LUK Lublin
  - 2026–27 Polish SuperCup, with Bogdanka LUK Lublin

=== Individual awards ===
- 2026: Polish Cup – Best setter
- 2026: Polish SuperCup – Most valuable player
