= 2022 FIVB Men's Volleyball Nations League squads =

This article shows the roster of all participating teams at the 2022 FIVB Volleyball Men's Nations League.

== Argentina ==
The following is Argentina's roster in the 2022 Men's Nations League.

Head coach: (Argentina) Marcelo Méndez

- 1 Matías Sánchez S
- 2 Tobias Scarpa L
- 3 Jan Martínez Franchi OH
- 4 Joaquin Gallego MB
- 5 Pablo Urchevich S
- 6 Federico Martina OP
- 8 Agustín Loser MB
- 9 Santiago Danani L
- 10 Nicolás Lazo OH
- 11 Manuel Armoa OH
- 12 Bruno Lima OP
- 13 Ezequiel Palacios OH
- 14 Nicolás Méndez OH
- 15 Luciano De Cecco S
- 16 Luciano Palonsky OH
- 17 Luciano Vicentín OH
- 18 Martín Ramos MB
- 19 Franco Massimino L
- 20 Mauro Zelayeta OH
- 22 Nicolás Zerba MB
- 23 Flavio Rajczakowski MB
- 24 Manuel Balagué OP
- 66 Franco Medina MB
- 77 Matias Giraudo S

== Australia ==
The following is Australia's roster in the 2022 Men's Nations League.

Head coach: (Canada) Dave Preston

- 1 Beau Graham MB
- 2 Arshdeep Dosanjh S
- 3 Lorenzo Pope OH
- 4 Jackson Holland L
- 5 Malachi Murch OH
- 6 Thomas Edgar OP
- 7 James Weir MB
- 8 Trent O'Dea MB
- 9 Max Staples OH
- 10 Nicolas Borgeaud S
- 11 Luke Perry L
- 12 Nehemiah Mote MB
- 13 Thomas Heptinstall OP
- 14 Hamish Hazelden OP
- 15 Conal McAinsh MB
- 17 Korben Phillips MB
- 18 Lincoln Williams OP
- 19 William D'Arcy OP
- 21 Nicholas Butler S
- 23 Sam Flowerday OH
- 26 Dimitri Sidiropoulos S
- 27 Max Senica OH
- 29 Ethan Garrett OH
- 31 Matthew Aubrey OP
- 33 Lachlan Bray OH

== Brazil ==
The following is Brazil's roster in the 2022 Men's Nations League.

Head coach: (Brazil) Renan Dal Zotto

- 1 Bruno Rezende S
- 2 Leonardo Andrade MB
- 3 João Rafael Ferreira OH
- 4 Franco Paese OP
- 5 Matheus Gonçalves S
- 6 Adriano Fernandes OH
- 9 Yoandy Leal OH
- 10 Matheus Santos MB
- 11 Rodrigo Leão OH
- 12 Isac Santos MB
- 13 Gabriel Kavalkievicz OH
- 14 Fernando Kreling S
- 15 Maique Nascimento L
- 16 Lucas Saatkamp MB
- 17 Thales Hoss L
- 18 Ricardo Lucarelli OH
- 19 Leandro Santos MB
- 20 Henrique Honorato OH
- 21 Alan Souza OP
- 22 Alexandre Elias L
- 23 Flávio Gualberto MB
- 25 Victor Cardoso OH
- 28 Darlan Souza OP

== Bulgaria ==
The following is Bulgaria's roster in the 2022 Men's Nations League.

Head coach: (Bulgaria) Nikolay Jeliazkov

- 1 Denis Karyagin OP
- 2 Stefan Chavdarov MB
- 3 Nikolay Kolev MB
- 4 Martin Atanasov OH
- 5 Svetoslav Gotsev MB
- 6 Vladimir Stankov S
- 7 Dobromir Dimitrov S
- 9 Georgi Seganov S
- 10 Svetoslav Stankov S
- 11 Aleks Grozdanov MB
- 12 Georgi Tatarov OP
- 13 Dimitar Dimitrov OP
- 14 Asparuh Asparuhov OH
- 15 Radoslav Parapunov OP
- 16 Vladislav Ivanov L
- 17 Samuil Valchinov OH
- 18 Svetoslav Ivanov OH
- 20 Ventsislav Ragin MB
- 21 Iliya Petkov MB
- 22 Nikolay Kartev MB
- 23 Aleksandar Nikolov OH
- 24 Martin Ivanov L
- 25 Venislav Antov OP
- 26 Nikolay Zahariev MB
- 27 Martin Bozhilov L

== Canada ==
The following is Canada's roster in the 2022 Men's Nations League.

Head coach: (Canada) Ben Josephson

- 1 Jordan Canham OP
- 2 Matthew Neaves OP
- 3 Jesse Elser OH
- 4 Nicholas Hoag OH
- 5 Eric Loeppky OH
- 6 Danny Demyanenko MB
- 7 Stephen Maar OH
- 8 Brett Walsh S
- 9 Jay Blankenau S
- 10 Ryan Sclater OP
- 11 Pearson Eshenko MB
- 12 Lucas Van Berkel MB
- 13 Max Elgert S
- 14 Xander Ketrzynski OP
- 15 Marc Wilson MB
- 16 Jordan Schnitzer MB
- 17 Ryley Barnes OH
- 18 Justin Lui L
- 19 Brodie Hofer OH
- 20 Derek Epp S
- 21 Jackson Howe MB
- 22 Brandon Koppers OH
- 23 Fynn McCarthy MB
- 24 Mathias Elser S
- 25 Samuel Cooper OH

== China ==
The following is China's roster in the 2022 Men's Nations League.

Head coach: (China) Wu Sheng

- 1 Dai Qingyao OH
- 2 Jiang Chuan OP
- 3 Qu Zongshuai L
- 4 Yang Yiming L
- 5 Zhang Binglong OH
- 6 Yu Yuantai OH
- 7 Yu Yaochen S
- 8 Yang Tianyuan L
- 9 Li Yongzhen MB
- 10 Liu Meng S
- 11 Jiang Zhengyang MB
- 12 Zhang Zhejia MB
- 13 Chen Leiyang S
- 14 Wang Dongchen MB
- 15 Peng Shikun MB
- 16 Wang Hebin S
- 17 Wang Jingyi OP
- 18 Yuan Dangyi OH
- 19 Zhang Guanhua OP
- 20 Dai Haibo MB
- 21 Miao Ruantong MB
- 22 Zhang Jingyin OH
- 23 Wu Pengzhi OP
- 24 Qi Jiahao L
- 25 Zhai Dejun OH

== France ==
The following is the France's roster in the 2022 Men's Nations League.

Head coach: (Italy) Andrea Giani

- 1 Barthélémy Chinenyeze MB
- 2 Jenia Grebennikov L
- 3 Raphael Corre S
- 4 Jean Patry OP
- 5 Jeremie Mouiel L
- 6 Benjamin Toniutti S
- 7 Kévin Tillie OH
- 9 Earvin N'Gapeth OH
- 11 Antoine Brizard S
- 12 Stéphen Boyer OP
- 13 Luca Ramon L
- 14 Nicolas Le Goff MB
- 15 Médéric Henry MB
- 16 Daryl Bultor MB
- 17 Trévor Clévenot OH
- 19 Yacine Louati OH
- 20 Benjamin Diez L
- 21 Théo Faure OP
- 22 Pierre Derouillon OH
- 23 Luka Basic OH
- 24 Moussé Gueye MB
- 25 Quentin Jouffroy MB
- 26 François Rebeyrol OH
- 27 Ibrahim Lawani OP
- 28 Gill Thomas S

== Germany ==
The following is Germany's roster in the 2022 Men's Nations League.

Head coach: (Poland) Michał Winiarski

- 1 Christian Fromm OH
- 2 Johannes Tille S
- 3 Ruben Schott OH
- 4 Leonard Graven L
- 5 Moritz Reichert OH
- 10 Julian Zenger L
- 11 Lukas Kampa S
- 14 Moritz Karlitzek OH
- 15 Franz Hüther MB
- 16 Eric Burggräf S
- 17 Jan Zimmermann S
- 18 Florian Krage MB
- 19 Erik Röhrs OH
- 20 Linus Weber OP
- 21 Tobias Krick MB
- 22 Tobias Brand OH
- 23 Yannick Goralik MB
- 24 Daniel Malescha OP
- 25 Lukas Maase MB
- 27 Moritz Eckardt L
- 29 Leon Dervisaj S
- 32 Iven Ferch MB
- 38 Tim Peter OH
- 40 Max Schulz OH
- 44 Simon Gallas OP

== Iran ==
The following is Iran's roster in the 2022 Men's Nations League.

Head coach: (Iran) Behrouz Ataei

- 1 Mahdi Jelveh MB
- 2 Milad Ebadipour OH
- 3 Reza Abedini MB
- 5 Amir Hossein Toukhteh MB
- 7 Esmaeil Mosafer OH
- 8 Mohammad Reza Hazratpour L
- 9 Mohammad Reza Moazzen L
- 11 Saber Kazemi OP
- 12 Mojtaba Mirzajanpour OH
- 13 Ali Ramezani S
- 14 Meisam Salehi OH
- 15 Aliasghar Mojarad MB
- 16 Abolfazl Gholipour L
- 17 Amin Esmaeilnejad OP
- 18 Mohammad Taher Vadi S
- 19 Ehsan Daneshdoust OH
- 20 Porya Yali OP
- 21 Amir Reza Sarlak MB
- 22 Amirhossein Esfandiar OH
- 23 Bardia Saadat OP
- 24 Javad Karimi S
- 25 Fazel Pazhooman S
- 26 Mehrab Malakisorkhi MB
- 30 Amirhassan Fahradi OH
- 49 Morteza Sharifi OH

== Italy ==
The following is Italy's roster in the 2022 Men's Nations League.

Head coach: (Italy) Ferdinando De Giorgi

- 1 Giulio Pinali OP
- 2 Fabio Ricci MB
- 3 Francesco Recine OH
- 4 Oreste Cavuto OH
- 5 Alessandro Michieletto OH
- 6 Simone Giannelli S
- 7 Fabio Balaso L
- 8 Riccardo Sbertoli S
- 9 Ivan Zaytsev OH
- 10 Marco Falaschi S
- 11 Davide Gardini OH
- 12 Mattia Bottolo OH
- 13 Lorenzo Cortesia MB
- 14 Gianluca Galassi MB
- 15 Daniele Lavia OH
- 16 Yuri Romanò OP
- 17 Simone Anzani MB
- 18 Fabrizio Gironi OH
- 19 Roberto Russo MB
- 20 Paolo Porro S
- 21 Alessandro Piccinelli L
- 22 Tommaso Stefani OP
- 24 Leonardo Scanferla L
- 25 Marco Vitelli MB
- 30 Leandro Mosca MB

== Japan ==
The following is Japan's roster in the 2022 Men's Nations League.

Head coach: (France) Philippe Blain

- 1 Yuji Nishida OP
- 2 Taishi Onodera MB
- 3 Akihiro Fukatsu S
- 4 Issei Otake OP
- 5 Tatsunori Otsuka OH
- 6 Akihiro Yamauchi MB
- 7 Kenta Takanashi OH
- 8 Masahiro Sekita S
- 9 Masaki Oya S
- 10 Kentaro Takahashi MB
- 11 Shoma Tomita OH
- 12 Ran Takahashi OH
- 13 Tomohiro Ogawa L
- 14 Yuki Ishikawa OH
- 16 Kento Miyaura OP
- 17 Akito Yamazaki OH
- 18 Kenyu Nakamoto OH
- 20 Tomohiro Yamamoto L
- 21 Motoki Eiro S
- 22 Yuki Higuchi OH
- 24 Kazuyuki Takahashi L
- 26 Go Murayama MB
- 30 Larry Evbade-Dan MB
- 34 Masato Kai MB
- 36 Yuichiro Komiya MB

== Netherlands ==
The following is Netherlands' roster in the 2022 Men's Nations League.

Head coach: (Italy) Roberto Piazza

- 1 Markus Held S
- 2 Wessel Keemink S
- 3 Maarten van Garderen OH
- 4 Thijs ter Horst OH
- 5 Luuc van der Ent MB
- 6 Jasper Wijkstra OP
- 7 Gijs Jorna OH
- 8 Fabian Plak MB
- 9 Steven Ottevanger L
- 10 Stijn van Tilburg OH
- 11 Martijn Brilhuis OP
- 12 Bennie Tuinstra OH
- 13 Mats Bleeker L
- 14 Nimir Abdel-Aziz OP
- 15 Gijs van Solkema S
- 17 Michael Parkinson MB
- 18 Robbert Andringa L
- 19 Freek de Weijer S
- 20 Yannick Bak OH
- 21 Joris Berkhout S
- 22 Twan Wiltenburg MB
- 23 Robin Boekhoudt MB
- 24 Ricardo Hofman OP
- 25 Siebe Korenblek MB
- 26 Sil Meijs S

== Poland ==
The following is Poland's roster in the 2022 Men's Nations League.

Head coach: (Serbia) Nikola Grbić

- 1 Bartłomiej Lipiński OH
- 2 Maciej Muzaj OP
- 3 Jakub Popiwczak L
- 4 Łukasz Kozub S
- 5 Łukasz Kaczmarek OP
- 6 Bartosz Kurek OP
- 7 Karol Kłos MB
- 10 Bartosz Bednorz OH
- 12 Grzegorz Łomacz S
- 13 Rafał Szymura OH
- 14 Aleksander Śliwka OH
- 15 Jakub Kochanowski MB
- 16 Kamil Semeniuk OH
- 17 Paweł Zatorski L
- 18 Bartosz Kwolek OH
- 19 Marcin Janusz S
- 20 Mateusz Bieniek MB
- 21 Tomasz Fornal OH
- 22 Karol Urbanowicz MB
- 23 Karol Butryn OP
- 24 Kamil Szymura L
- 72 Mateusz Poręba MB
- 96 Jan Firlej S

== Serbia ==
The following is Serbia's roster in the 2022 Men's Nations League.

Head coach: (Montenegro) Igor Kolaković

- 1 Uroš Nikolić OH
- 4 Nemanja Petrić OH
- 5 Milan Katić OH
- 6 Nikola Peković L
- 7 Petar Krsmanović MB
- 8 Marko Ivović OH
- 9 Nikola Jovović S
- 10 Miran Kujundžić OH
- 12 Pavle Perić OH
- 14 Aleksandar Atanasijević OP
- 15 Nemanja Mašulović MB
- 18 Marko Podraščanin MB
- 20 Srećko Lisinac MB
- 21 Vuk Todorović S
- 22 Andrija Vilimanović S
- 23 Božidar Vučićević OP
- 25 Luka Tadić OH
- 28 Lazar Marinović OH
- 29 Aleksandar Nedeljković MB
- 30 Lazar Koprivica L
- 32 Nikola Meljanac OP
- 33 Dušan Petković OP
- 35 Andrej Rudić MB
- 39 Andrija Vulikić S
- 40 Miljan Milović L

== Slovenia ==
The following is Slovenia's roster in the 2022 Men's Nations League.

Head coach: (Australia) Mark Lebedew

- 1 Tonček Štern OP
- 2 Alen Pajenk MB
- 3 Uroš Planinšič S
- 4 Jan Kozamernik MB
- 5 Alen Šket OP
- 6 Mitja Gasparini OP
- 7 Alan Košenina L
- 8 Crtomir Bošnjak OH
- 9 Dejan Vinčić S
- 10 Sašo Štalekar MB
- 11 Danijel Koncilja MB
- 12 Jan Klobučar OH
- 13 Jani Kovačič L
- 14 Žiga Štern OH
- 15 Matic Videčnik MB
- 16 Gregor Ropret S
- 17 Tine Urnaut OH
- 18 Klemen Čebulj OH
- 19 Rok Možič OH
- 20 Nik Mujanović OP
- 21 Gregor Pernuš S
- 22 Janž Kržič MB
- 23 Jure Okroglič OH

== United States ==
The following is United States' roster in the 2022 Men's Nations League.

Head coach: (United States) John Speraw

- 2 Aaron Russell OH
- 3 James Shaw S
- 4 Jeffrey Jendryk MB
- 5 Kyle Ensing OP
- 6 Mitchell Stahl MB
- 7 Jacob Pasteur OH
- 8 Torey DeFalco OH
- 9 Jake Hanes OP
- 10 Kyle Dagostino L
- 11 Micah Christenson S
- 13 Patrick Gasman MB
- 14 Quinn Isaacson S
- 15 Kyle Russell OP
- 16 Joshua Tuaniga S
- 17 Thomas Jaeschke OH
- 18 Garrett Muagututia OH
- 20 David Smith MB
- 21 Mason Briggs L
- 22 Erik Shoji L
- 23 Cody Kessel OH
- 24 Brett Wildman OH
- 25 William Rottman OH
- 26 Merrick McHenry MB
- 27 Tyler Mitchem MB
- 31 Spencer Olivier OH
