= 2023 FIVB Men's Volleyball Nations League squads =

This article shows the roster of all participating teams at the 2023 FIVB Volleyball Men's Nations League.

== Argentina ==
The following is Argentina's roster in the 2023 Men's Nations League.

Head coach: (Argentina) Marcelo Méndez

- 1 Matías Sánchez S
- 2 Valentino Vidoni OH
- 3 Jan Martínez Franchi U
- 4 Joaquin Gallego MB
- 5 Tobias Scarpa L
- 6 Luciano Aloisi S
- 7 Luciano Palonsky OH
- 8 Agustín Loser MB
- 9 Santiago Danani L
- 10 Mauro Zelayeta OH
- 11 Manuel Armoa OH
- 12 Bruno Lima OP
- 13 Ezequiel Palacios OH
- 14 Nicolás Méndez OH
- 15 Luciano De Cecco S
- 16 Pablo Sergio Koukartsev OH
- 17 Luciano Vicentín OH
- 18 Martín Ramos MB
- 19 Federico Arquez S
- 20 Sergio Soria MB
- 22 Nicolás Zerba MB
- 23 Ramses Cascu MB
- 25 Manuel Balague OP
- 77 Matias Giraudo S

== Brazil ==
The following is Brazil's roster in the 2023 Men's Nations League.

Head coach: (Brazil) Renan Dal Zotto

- 1 Bruno Rezende S
- 2 Leonardo Andrade MB
- 3 João Rafael Ferreira OH
- 4 Otávio Pinto OH
- 5 Matheus Gonçalves S
- 6 Adriano Fernandes OH
- 7 Aboubacar Dramé Neto OP
- 8 Henrique Honorato OH
- 9 Yoandy Leal OH
- 10 Matheus Santos MB
- 11 Rodrigo Leão OH
- 12 Isac Santos MB
- 13 Gabriel Kavalkievicz OH
- 14 Fernando Kreling S
- 15 Maique Nascimento L
- 16 Lucas Saatkamp MB
- 17 Thales Hoss L
- 18 Ricardo Lucarelli OH
- 19 Felipe Roque OP
- 20 Arthur Bento OH
- 21 Alan Souza OP
- 22 Alexandre Elias L
- 23 Flávio Gualberto MB
- 25 Victor Cardoso OH
- 26 Thiago Veloso S
- 27 Thiery Oliveira MB
- 28 Darlan Souza OP
- 29 Daniel Muniz OH
- 30 Judson Cunha MB
- 31 Welinton Oppenkoski OP

== Bulgaria ==
The following is Bulgaria's roster in the 2023 Men's Nations League

Head coach: (Bulgaria) Plamen Konstantinov

- 1 Georgi Bratoev S
- 2 Stefan Chavdarov MB
- 3 Nikolay Kolev MB
- 4 Martin Atanasov OH
- 5 Svetoslav Gotsev MB
- 6 Matey Kaziyski OH
- 7 Branimir Grozdanov S
- 8 Asparuh Asparuhov OH
- 9 Georgi Seganov S
- 10 Denis Karyagin OH
- 11 Aleks Grozdanov MB
- 12 Dimitar Dimitrov OP
- 13 Teodor Salparov L
- 14 Martin Ivanov L
- 15 Delcho Raev S
- 16 Vladislav Ivanov L
- 17 Nikolay Penchev OH
- 18 Svetoslav Ivanov OH
- 19 Tsvetan Sokolov OP
- 20 Valentin Bratoev MB
- 21 Simeon Dobrev L
- 22 Nikolay Kartev MB
- 23 Aleksandar Nikolov OH
- 24 Iliya Petkov MB
- 25 Radoslav Parapunov OP
- 26 Krasimir Georgiev MB
- 27 Dobromir Dimitrov S
- 28 Samuil Valchinov OH

== Canada ==
The following is Canada's roster in the 2023 Men's Nations League.

Head coach: (Finland) Tuomas Sammelvuo

- 1 Pearson Eshenko MB
- 2 Luke Herr S
- 4 Nicholas Hoag OH
- 5 Brodie Hofer OH
- 6 Danny Demyanenko MB
- 7 Stephen Maar OH
- 9 Jay Blankenau S
- 10 Ryan Sclater OP
- 12 Lucas Van Berkel MB
- 13 Samuel Cooper OH
- 14 Arthur Szwarc OP
- 16 Jordan Schnitzer MB
- 18 Justin Lui L
- 97 Landon Currie L
- 99 Mathias Elser OH

== China ==
The following is China's roster in the 2023 Men's Nations League.

Head coach: (China) Wu Sheng

- 1 Wang Dongchen MB
- 2 Jiang Chuan OP
- 3 Wang Hebin S
- 6 Yu Yuantai OH
- 8 Guo Cheng S
- 9 Li Yongzhen MB
- 10 Liu Meng S
- 11 Chen Jiajie L
- 14 Zhai Dejun OH
- 15 Peng Shikun MB
- 16 Qu Zongshuai L
- 19 Zhang Guanhua OP
- 22 Zhang Jingyin OH
- 23 Wang Bin OH

== Cuba ==
The following is Cuba's roster in the 2023 Men's Nations League.

Head coach: (Cuba) Nicolas Vives

- 1 José Masso MB
- 2 Osniel Melgarejo OH
- 5 Javier Concepción MB
- 6 Christian Thondike Mejías S
- 7 Yonder García L
- 10 Miguel Gutiérrez OP
- 11 Liván Taboada S
- 12 Jesús Herrera OP
- 13 Robertlandy Simón MB
- 14 Adrián Goide S
- 18 Miguel Ángel López OH
- 22 José Miguel Gutiérrez OH
- 23 Marlon Yant OH
- 24 Alain Gourguet L

== France ==
The following is the France's roster in the 2023 Men's Nations League.

Head coach: (Italy) Andrea Giani

- 3 Raphael Corre S
- 5 Kellian Motta Paes S
- 7 Kévin Tillie OH
- 15 Médéric Henry MB
- 16 Daryl Bultor MB
- 18 Antoine Pothron OH
- 20 Benjamin Diez L
- 21 Théo Faure OP
- 22 Luka Basic OH
- 23 Timothée Carle OH
- 25 Quentin Jouffroy MB
- 26 Hilir Henno OH
- 28 Thibault Loubeyre L
- 29 Simon Roehrig MB

== Germany ==
The following is Germany's roster in the 2023 Men's Nations League.

Head coach: (Poland) Michał Winiarski

- 2 Johannes Tille S
- 3 Denis Kaliberda OH
- 5 Moritz Reichert OH
- 6 Leonard Graven L
- 11 Lukas Kampa S
- 13 Ruben Schott OH
- 18 Florian Krage MB
- 19 Erik Röhrs OH
- 20 Linus Weber OP
- 21 Tobias Krick MB
- 22 Tobias Brand OH
- 25 Lukas Maase MB
- 30 Yann Böhme OP

== Iran ==
The following is Iran's roster in the 2023 Men's Nations League.

Head coach: (Iran) Behrouz Ataei

- 1 Mahdi Jelveh MB
- 6 Mohammad Mousavi MB
- 8 Mohammad Reza Hazratpour L
- 10 Amin Esmaeilnejad OP
- 12 Amirhossein Esfandiar OH
- 14 Mohammad Javad Manavinejad OH
- 16 Ali Hajipour Moghadam Faroji OP
- 18 Mohammad Taher Vadi S
- 19 Poriya Hossein Khanzadeh Firouzjah OH
- 20 Shahrooz Homayonfarmanesh OH
- 21 Arman Salehi L
- 24 Javad Karimi S
- 27 Mohammad Valizadeh MB
- 49 Morteza Sharifi OH

== Italy ==
The following is Italy's roster in the 2023 Men's Nations League.

Head coach: (Italy) Ferdinando De Giorgi

- 2 Paolo Porro S
- 3 Marco Falaschi S
- 5 Alessandro Michieletto OH
- 6 Simone Giannelli S
- 7 Fabio Balaso L
- 8 Riccardo Sbertoli S
- 9 Francesco Recine OH
- 10 Leonardo Scanferla L
- 11 Davide Gardini OH
- 12 Mattia Bottolo OH
- 13 Lorenzo Cortesia MB
- 14 Gianluca Galassi MB
- 15 Daniele Lavia OH
- 16 Yuri Romanò OP
- 18 Fabrizio Gironi OH
- 19 Roberto Russo MB
- 20 Tommaso Rinaldi OH
- 21 Alessandro Piccinelli L
- 25 Marco Vitelli MB
- 28 Giovanni Sanguinetti MB
- 30 Leandro Mosca MB
- 31 Lorenzo Sala OH

== Japan ==
The following is Japan's roster in the 2023 Men's Nations League.

Head coach: (France) Philippe Blain

- 1 Yuji Nishida OP
- 2 Taishi Onodera MB
- 3 Akihiro Fukatsu S
- 4 Kento Miyaura OP
- 5 Tatsunori Otsuka OH
- 6 Akihiro Yamauchi MB
- 7 Kenta Takanashi OH
- 8 Masahiro Sekita S
- 9 Masaki Oya S
- 10 Kentaro Takahashi MB
- 11 Shoma Tomita OH
- 12 Ran Takahashi OH
- 13 Tomohiro Ogawa L
- 14 Yuki Ishikawa OH
- 16 Go Murayama MB
- 18 Hiroto Nishiyama OP
- 19 Satoshi Tsuiki L
- 20 Tomohiro Yamamoto L
- 21 Motoki Eiro S
- 22 Kenya Fujinaka OH
- 23 Shunichiro Sato MB
- 24 Kazuyuki Takahashi L
- 26 Akito Yamazaki OH
- 28 Larry Evbade-Dan MB
- 29 Ryu Yamamoto S
- 30 Masato Kai MB
- 31 Keihan Takahashi OH
- 32 Kento Asano MB
- 34 Yudai Arai OH
- 35 Hirohito Kashimura MB

== Netherlands ==
The following is Netherlands' roster in the 2023 Men's Nations League.

Head coach: (Italy) Roberto Piazza

- 1 Siebe Korenblek MB
- 2 Wessel Keemink S
- 3 Maarten van Garderen OH
- 5 Luuc van der Ent MB
- 6 Sil Meijs S
- 7 Gijs Jorna OH
- 8 Fabian Plak MB
- 12 Bennie Tuinstra OH
- 14 Nimir Abdel-Aziz OP
- 18 Robbert Andringa L
- 20 Yannick Bak OH
- 22 Twan Wiltenburg MB
- 25 Jasper Wijkstra OH
- 30 Niels Lipke L

== Poland ==
The following is Poland's roster in the 2023 Men's Nations League.

Head coach: (Serbia) Nikola Grbić

- 2 Jakub Szymański OH
- 3 Jakub Popiwczak L
- 5 Łukasz Kaczmarek OP
- 6 Bartosz Kurek OP
- 7 Karol Kłos MB
- 9 Wilfredo Leon OH
- 10 Bartosz Bednorz OH
- 11 Aleksander Śliwka OH
- 12 Grzegorz Łomacz S
- 15 Jakub Kochanowski MB
- 16 Kamil Semeniuk OH
- 17 Paweł Zatorski L
- 19 Marcin Janusz S
- 20 Mateusz Bieniek MB
- 21 Tomasz Fornal OH
- 22 Karol Urbanowicz MB
- 23 Karol Butryn OP
- 24 Kamil Szymura L
- 25 Artur Szalpuk OH
- 41 Jakub Hawryluk L
- 44 Kuba Hawryluk L
- 55 Mikołaj Sawicki OH
- 72 Mateusz Poręba MB
- 96 Jan Firlej S
- 99 Norbert Huber MB

== Serbia ==
The following is Serbia's roster in the 2023 Men's Nations League.

Head coach: (Montenegro) Igor Kolaković

- 2 Uroš Kovačević OH
- 3 Milorad Kapur L
- 4 Veljko Mašulović OH
- 5 Milan Katić OH
- 7 Petar Krsmanović MB
- 8 Marko Ivović OH
- 10 Miran Kujundžić OH
- 11 Aleksa Batak S
- 12 Pavle Perić OH
- 13 Vladimir Gajović MB
- 14 Aleksandar Atanasijević OP
- 15 Nemanja Mašulović OP
- 16 Dražen Luburić OP
- 17 Miloš Krsteski L
- 18 Marko Podraščanin MB
- 19 Dušan Petrović MB
- 21 Vuk Todorović S
- 23 Božidar Vučićević OP
- 29 Aleksandar Nedeljković MB

== Slovenia ==
The following is Slovenia's roster in the 2023 Men's Nations League.

Head coach: (Romania) Gheorghe Crețu

- 2 Alen Pajenk MB
- 3 Uroš Planinšič S
- 4 Jan Kozamernik MB
- 5 Matej Kök OH
- 6 Urban Toman L
- 8 Rok Bračko OH
- 10 Sašo Štalekar MB
- 11 Danijel Koncilja MB
- 13 Jani Kovačič L
- 14 Žiga Štern OH
- 16 Gregor Ropret S
- 17 Tine Urnaut OH
- 18 Klemen Čebulj OH
- 19 Rok Možič OH

== United States ==
The following is the United States roster in the 2023 Men's Nations League.

Head coach: (United States) John Speraw

- 1 Matthew Anderson L
- 2 Aaron Russell OH
- 4 Jeffrey Jendryk MB
- 8 Torey DeFalco OH
- 9 Jake Hanes OP
- 10 Kyle Dagostino L
- 11 Micah Christenson S
- 12 Maxwell Holt MB
- 14 Micah Maʻa S
- 17 Thomas Jaeschke OH
- 18 Garrett Muagututia OH
- 19 Taylor Averill OH
- 20 David Smith MB
- 22 Erik Shoji L

== See also ==
- 2023 FIVB Volleyball Women's Nations League squads
