= 2024 FIVB Men's Volleyball Nations League squads =

This article shows the roster of all the participating teams at the 2024 FIVB Men's Volleyball Nations League.

== Argentina ==
The following was Argentina's roster at the 2024 Men's Volleyball Nations League.

Head coach: (Argentina) Marcelo Méndez

- 1 Matías Sánchez Pages S
- 3 Jan Martínez Franchi OH
- 4 Joaquín Gallego MB
- 7 Facundo Conte OH
- 8 Agustín Loser MB
- 9 Santiago Danani L
- 12 Bruno Lima OP
- 13 Ezequiel Palacios OH
- 15 Luciano De Cecco S
- 16 Pablo Koukartsev OH
- 17 Luciano Vicentín OH
- 18 Martín Ramos MB
- 21 Luciano Palonsky OH
- 22 Nicolás Zerba MB
- 77 Matias Giraudo S reserve
- 29 German Alfredo Gomez OP reserve
- 31 Gustavo Maciel MB reserve
- 11 Manuel Armoa OH reserve

== Brazil ==
The following was Brazil's roster at the 2024 Men's Volleyball Nations League.

Head coach: (Brazil) Bernardo Rezende

- 1 Bruno Rezende S
- 2 Lukas Felipe Bergmann OP
- 6 Adriano Fernandes OH
- 8 Henrique Honorato OH
- 9 Yoandy Leal OH
- 12 Isac Santos MB
- 14 Fernando Kreling S
- 16 Lucas Saatkamp MB
- 17 Thales Hoss L
- 18 Ricardo Lucarelli OH
- 19 Mauricio Borges Almeida Silva OH
- 21 Alan Souza OP
- 23 Flávio Gualberto MB
- 28 Darlan Souza OP
- 5 Matheus Gonçalves S reserve
- 30 Judson Nunes MB reserve
- 20 Arthur Bento OH reserve

== Bulgaria ==
The following was Bulgaria's roster at the 2024 Men's Volleyball Nations League

Head coach: (Italy) Gianlorenzo Blengini

- 1 Simeon Nikolov S
- 8 Asparuh Asparuhov OH
- 10 Denis Karyagin OH
- 11 Aleks Grozdanov MB
- 12 Georgi Tatarov OH
- 13 Dimitar Dimitrov OP
- 14 Martin Bozhilov L
- 16 Svetoslav Stankov S
- 17 Samuil Valchinov OH
- 18 Venislav Antov OP
- 21 Simeon Dobrev L
- 24 Iliya Petkov MB
- 27 Boris Nachev MB
- 29 Denislav Bardarov OH
- 9 Vladimir Garkov OH reserve
- 22 Damyan Kolev L reserve
- 20 Stoil Palev S reserve
- 19 Nikolay Kartev MB reserve

== Canada ==
The following was Canada's roster at the 2024 Men's Volleyball Nations League.

Head coach: (Finland) Tuomas Sammelvuo

- 2 Luke Herr S
- 4 Nicholas Hoag OH
- 5 Brodie Hofer OH
- 6 Danny Demyanenko MB
- 7 Stephen Maar OH
- 8 Brett James Walsh S
- 11 Xander Ketrzynski OP
- 12 Lucas Van Berkel MB
- 14 Arthur Szwarc OP
- 17 Ryley Barnes L
- 18 Justin Lui L
- 33 Fynn McCarthy MB
- 80 Eric Loeppky OH

== Cuba ==
The following was Cuba's roster at the 2024 Men's Volleyball Nations League.

Head coach: (Cuba) Jesús Ángel Cruz López

- 1 José Masso MB
- 2 Osniel Melgarejo OH
- 4 Michael Sánchez Bozhulev OP
- 5 Javier Concepción MB
- 6 Christian Thondike Mejías S
- 7 Yonder García L
- 11 Liván Taboada S
- 13 Robertlandy Simón MB
- 15 Bryan Camino Martinez OH
- 17 Roamy Raul Alonso Arce MB
- 18 Miguel Ángel López OH
- 23 Marlon Yant OH
- 24 Alain Gourguet L
- 33 Carlos Yoandrys Charles Santana OP

== France ==
The following was France's roster at the 2024 Men's Volleyball Nations League.

Head coach: (Italy) Andrea Giani

- 2 Jenia Grebennikov L
- 4 Jean Patry OP
- 6 Benjamin Toniutti S
- 7 Kévin Tillie OH
- 9 Earvin N'Gapeth OH
- 11 Antoine Brizard S
- 14 Nicolas Le Goff MB
- 17 Trevor Clevenot OH
- 19 Yacine Louati OH
- 20 Benjamin Diez L
- 21 Théo Faure OP
- 23 Timothée Carle OH
- 25 Quentin Jouffroy MB
- 31 Joris Seddik MB
- 16 Daryl Bultor MB reserve

== Germany ==
The following was Germany's roster at the 2024 Men's Volleyball Nations League.

Head coach: (Poland) Michał Winiarski

- 1 Christian Fromm OH
- 2 Leonard Graven L
- 5 Moritz Reichert OH
- 6 Johannes Tille S
- 9 György Grozer OP
- 10 Julian Zenger L
- 11 Lukas Kampa S
- 13 Ruben Schott OH
- 14 Moritz Karlitzek OH
- 17 Jan Zimmermann S
- 18 Florian Krage MB
- 21 Tobias Krick MB
- 22 Tobias Brand OH
- 25 Lukas Maase MB

== Iran ==
The following was Iran's roster at the 2024 Men's Volleyball Nations League.

Head coach: (Iran) Peyman Akbari

- 1 Mahdi Jelveh MB
- 2 Milad Ebadipour OH
- 7 Alireza Moslehabadi Farahani MB
- 8 Mohammad Reza Hazratpour L
- 9 Poriya Hossein Khanzadeh OH
- 10 Amin Esmaeilnejad OP
- 17 Meisam Salehi L
- 18 Mohammad Taher Vadi S
- 21 Arman Salehi Li
- 27 Mohammad Valizadeh MB
- 30 Mobin Nasri OH
- 33 Seyed Amir Hossein Sadati OP
- 49 Morteza Sharifi OH
- 55 Arshia Behnezhad S
- 26 Mohammad Barbast OP reserve
- 29 Matin Ahmadi MB reserve

== Italy ==
The following was Italy's roster at the 2024 Men's Volleyball Nations League.

Head coach: (Italy) Ferdinando De Giorgi

- 2 Paolo Porro S
- 3 Francesco Recine OH
- 8 Riccardo Sbertoli S
- 11 Giovanni Sanguinetti MB
- 12 Mattia Bottolo OH
- 18 Fabrizio Gironi OH
- 20 Tommaso Rinaldi OH
- 21 Davide Gardini OH
- 22 Marco Gaggini L
- 23 Alessandro Bovolenta OP
- 27 Edoardo Caneschi MB
- 28 Gabriele Laurenzano L
- 30 Leandro Mosca MB
- 31 Luca Porro OH
- 9 Marco Falaschi S reserve
- 13 Lorenzo Cortesia MB reserve

== Japan ==
The following was Japan's roster at the 2024 Men's Volleyball Nations League.

Head coach: (France) Philippe Blain

- 1 Yuji Nishida OP
- 2 Taishi Onodera MB
- 3 Akihiro Fukatsu S
- 4 Kento Miyaura OP
- 5 Tatsunori Otsuka OH
- 6 Akihiro Yamauchi MB
- 8 Masahiro Sekita S
- 10 Kentaro Takahashi MB
- 11 Shoma Tomita OH
- 13 Tomohiro Ogawa L
- 14 Yuki Ishikawa OH
- 15 Kai Masato OH
- 20 Tomohiro Yamamoto L
- 23 Larry Ik Evbade-Dan MB
- 9 Masaki Oya S reserve
- 18 Hiroto Nishiyama OP reserve
- 7 Kenta Takanashi OH reserve
- 12 Ran Takahashi OH reserve

== Netherlands ==
The following was the Netherlands' roster at the 2024 Men's Volleyball Nations League.

Head coach: (Italy) Roberto Piazza

- 2 Wessel Keemink S
- 3 Maarten van Garderen OH
- 5 Luuc van der Ent MB
- 6 Sil Meijs S
- 7 Gijs Jorna OH
- 8 Fabian Plak MB
- 10 Tom Koops OH
- 11 Jeffrey Klok L
- 14 Nimir Abdel-Aziz OP
- 16 Wouter ter Maat OP
- 17 Michaël Parkinson MB
- 18 Robbert Andringa L
- 22 Twan Wiltenburg MB
- 24 Michiel Ahyi OP

== Poland ==
The following was Poland's roster at the 2024 Men's Volleyball Nations League.

Head coach: (Serbia) Nikola Grbić

- 3 Jakub Popiwczak L
- 5 Łukasz Kaczmarek OP
- 6 Bartosz Kurek OP
- 9 Wilfredo Leon OH
- 11 Aleksander Śliwka OH
- 12 Grzegorz Łomacz S
- 15 Jakub Kochanowski MB
- 16 Kamil Semeniuk OH
- 17 Paweł Zatorski L
- 19 Marcin Janusz S
- 20 Mateusz Bieniek MB
- 21 Tomasz Fornal OH
- 30 Bartłomiej Bołądź OP
- 99 Norbert Huber MB
- 7 Karol Kłos MB reserve
- 10 Bartosz Bednorz OH reserve
- 4 Marcin Komenda S reserve

== Serbia ==
The following was Serbia's roster at the 2024 Men's Volleyball Nations League.

Head coach: (Montenegro) Igor Kolaković

- 2 Uroš Kovačević OH
- 3 Milorad Kapur L
- 6 Vukasin Ristić L
- 7 Petar Krsmanović MB
- 8 Marko Ivović OH
- 9 Nikola Jovović S
- 10 Miran Kujundžić OH
- 12 Pavle Perić OH
- 14 Aleksandar Atanasijević OP
- 15 Nemanja Mašulović OP
- 16 Dražen Luburić OP
- 18 Marko Podraščanin MB
- 21 Vuk Todorović S
- 29 Aleksandar Nedeljković MB
- 4 Veljko Mašulović OH reserve

== Slovenia ==
The following was Slovenia's roster at the 2024 Men's Volleyball Nations League.

Head coach: (Romania) Gheorghe Crețu

- 1 Tonček Štern OP
- 2 Alen Pajenk MB
- 4 Jan Kozamernik MB
- 6 Urban Toman L
- 8 Rok Bračko OH
- 9 Dejan Vinčić S
- 10 Sašo Štalekar MB
- 13 Jani Kovačič L
- 14 Žiga Štern OH
- 16 Gregor Ropret S
- 17 Tine Urnaut OH
- 18 Klemen Čebulj OH
- 19 Rok Možič OH
- 20 Nik Mujanović OP
- 3 Uroš Planinšič S reserve
- 22 Janž Janez Kržič MB reserve
- 7 Luka Marovt OH reserve
- 23 Jošt Kržič MB reserve

== Turkey ==
The following was Turkey's roster at the 2024 Men's Volleyball Nations League.

Head coach: (France) Cédric Énard

- 2 Kaan Gürbüz OP
- 5 Mert Matić MB
- 6 Arda Bostan S
- 9 Ramazan Efe Mandıracı OH
- 12 Adis Lagumdžija OP
- 14 Faik Samet Güneş MB
- 15 Mirza Lagumdžija OH
- 17 Murat Yenipazar S
- 20 Efe Bayram OH
- 30 Yasin Aydın OH
- 40 Yiğit Hamza Aslan OH
- 53 Volkan Döne L
- 77 Bedirhan Bülbül MB
- 80 Beytullah Hatipoğlu L
- 7 Vahit Emre Savaş MB reserve

== United States ==
The following was the United States' roster at the 2024 Men's Volleyball Nations League.

Head coach: (United States) John Speraw

- 1 Matt Anderson OP
- 4 Jeffrey Jendryk MB
- 5 Kyle Ensing OP
- 8 Torey DeFalco OH
- 9 Jake Hanes OP
- 10 Kyle Dagostino L
- 11 Micah Christenson S
- 12 Maxwell Holt MB
- 14 Micah Maʻa S
- 18 Garrett Muagututia OH
- 19 Taylor Averill MB
- 22 Erik Shoji L
- 23 Cody Kessel OH
- 29 Jordan Ewert OH
- 20 David Smith MB reserve

== See also ==
- 2024 FIVB Women's Volleyball Nations League squads
- 2024 Summer Olympics women's team rosters
- 2024 Summer Olympics men's team rosters
