= 2024 Memorial of Hubert Jerzy Wagner squads =

This article shows the rosters of all participating teams at the 2024 Memorial of Hubert Jerzy Wagner in Kraków, Poland.

== Egypt ==
The following are Egypt's roster in the 2024 Memorial of Hubert Jerzy Wagner.

Head coach: (Spain) Fernando Muñoz

- 2 Ahmed Azab Abdelrahman OH
- 5 Mohamed Osman Elhaddad MB
- 6 Mohamed Hassan L
- 7 Mohamed Noureldin Ramadan L
- 8 Abdelrahman Elhossiny Eissa OH
- 9 Mohamed Sayedin Asran OH
- 10 Mohamed Masoud MB
- 12 Hossam Abdalla S
- 13 Mohamed Khater El Mahdy MB
- 14 Seifeldin Hassan Aly OP
- 16 Mostafa Gaber Abdelsalam Abdelmoaty S
- 17 Reda Haikal OP
- 22 Mohamed Moustafa Issa OH
- 23 Ahmed Omar OH

== Germany ==
The following was Germany's roster in the 2024 Memorial of Hubert Jerzy Wagner.

Head coach: (Poland) Michał Winiarski

- 1 Christian Fromm OH
- 2 Leonard Graven L
- 5 Moritz Reichert OH
- 6 Johannes Tille S
- 9 György Grozer OP
- 10 Julian Zenger L
- 11 Lukas Kampa S
- 12 Anton Brehme MB
- 13 Ruben Schott OH
- 14 Moritz Karlitzek OH
- 17 Jan Zimmermann S
- 18 Florian Krage MB
- 21 Tobias Krick MB
- 22 Tobias Brand OH
- 25 Lukas Maase MB

== Poland ==
The following is Poland's roster in the 2024 Memorial of Hubert Jerzy Wagner.

Head coach: (Serbia) Nikola Grbić

- 3 Jakub Popiwczak L
- 4 Marcin Komenda S
- 5 Łukasz Kaczmarek OP
- 6 Bartosz Kurek OP
- 7 Karol Kłos MB
- 9 Wilfredo Leon OH
- 10 Bartosz Bednorz OH
- 11 Aleksander Śliwka OH
- 12 Grzegorz Łomacz S
- 15 Jakub Kochanowski MB
- 16 Kamil Semeniuk OH
- 17 Paweł Zatorski L
- 19 Marcin Janusz S
- 20 Mateusz Bieniek MB
- 21 Tomasz Fornal OH
- 22 Karol Urbanowicz MB
- 23 Karol Butryn OP
- 24 Kamil Szymura L
- 25 Artur Szalpuk OH
- 41 Jakub Hawryluk L
- 44 Kuba Hawryluk L
- 55 Mikołaj Sawicki OH
- 72 Mateusz Poręba MB
- 96 Jan Firlej S
- 99 Norbert Huber MB

== Slovenia ==
The following is Slovenia's roster in the 2024 Memorial of Hubert Jerzy Wagner.

Head coach: (Romania) Gheorghe Crețu

- 1 Tonček Štern OH
- 2 Alen Pajenk MB
- 3 Uroš Planinšič S
- 4 Jan Kozamernik MB
- 5 Matej Kök OH
- 6 Urban Toman L
- 8 Rok Bračko OH
- 9 Dejan Vinčić S
- 10 Sašo Štalekar MB
- 11 Danijel Koncilja MB
- 13 Jani Kovačič L
- 14 Žiga Štern OH
- 16 Gregor Ropret S
- 17 Tine Urnaut OH
- 18 Klemen Čebulj OH
- 19 Rok Možič OH
- 20 Nik Mujanović OH
- 22 Janż Kriżić MB
