= 2026 Men's European Volleyball Championship squads =

This article shows all participating team squads at the 2026 Men's European Volleyball Championship, held in Bulgaria, Finland, Italy and Romania from 9 to 16 September 2026.

== Pool A ==
=== Czech Republic ===
The following is the Czech roster in the 2026 European Championship.

- Head coach: Jiří Novák
- 1 Jan Pavlíček L
- 4 Matouš Drahoňovský OS
- 6 Milan Moník L
- 7 Jiří Benda OS
- 8 Štěpán Svoboda MB
- 9 Luboš Bartůněk S
- 11 Lukáš Vašina OS
- 13 Matěj Pastrňák OS
- 17 Marek Šotola OP
- 19 Antonín Klimeš MB
- 23 Patrik Indra OP
- 33 Ondřej Roman S
- 51 Jakub Klajmon MB
- 54 Adam Zajíček MB

=== Greece ===
The following is the Greek roster in the 2026 European Championship.

- Head coach: Konstantinos Christofidelis
- 1 Stavros Kasampalis S
- 2 Lampros Pitakoudis MB
- 5 Spyridon Chandrinos OS
- 7 Athanasios Protopsaltis OS
- 10 Dimitrios Theodosis MB
- 11 Dimitrios Mouchlias OP
- 12 Theodoros Voulkidis MB
- 14 Markos Galiotos S
- 15 Alexandros Raptis OS
- 17 Evangelos Vaiopoulos MB
- 18 Angelos Markou OP
- 27 Stavros Mouchlias OS
- 33 Dimitrios Tziavras L
- 70 Aristeidis Chandrinos L

=== Italy ===
The following is the Italian roster in the 2026 European Championship.

- Head coach: Ferdinando De Giorgi
- 4 Gabriele Laurenzano L
- 5 Alessandro Michieletto OS
- 6 Simone Giannelli S
- 7 Fabio Balaso L
- 8 Riccardo Sbertoli S
- 9 Francesco Sani OS
- 11 Kamil Rychlicki OP
- 12 Mattia Bottolo OS
- 14 Gianluca Galassi MB
- 15 Daniele Lavia OS
- 16 Yuri Romanò OP
- 17 Luca Porro OS
- 18 Giovanni Sanguinetti MB
- 20 Pardo Mati MB

=== Slovakia ===
The following is the Slovakian roster in the 2026 European Championship.

- Head coach: Michal Masný
- 1 Samuel Paňko L
- 3 Patrik Lamanec OP
- 4 Branislav Hanúsek MB
- 6 Filip Palgut S
- 8 Peter Barták S
- 9 Erik Gulák OP
- 10 Filip Mákonya OS
- 11 Bartolomej Jakubík L
- 12 Martin Rendla OS
- 13 Jakub Ihnát OS
- 17 Andrej Billich MB
- 18 Daniel Šellong MB
- 22 Július Firkaľ OS
- 23 Patrik Matejčík OP

=== Slovenia ===
The following is the Slovenian roster in the 2026 European Championship.

- Head coach: (Italy) Fabio Soli
- 2 Alen Pajenk MB
- 3 Uroš Planinšič S
- 4 Jan Kozamernik MB
- 7 Luka Marovt OS
- 8 Rok Bračko OS
- 10 Sašo Štalekar MB
- 12 Grega Okroglič L
- 13 Jani Kovačič L
- 17 Tine Urnaut OS
- 19 Rok Možič OS
- 20 Nik Mujanović OP
- 22 Janž Janez Kržič MB
- 24 Nejc Najdič S
- 25 Klemen Šen OS

=== Sweden ===
The following is the Swedish roster in the 2026 European Championship.

- Head coach: (Netherlands) Gido Vermeulen
- 2 Olle Leijon OS
- 3 Joel Andersson L
- 4 Axel Algulin OS
- 6 Jacob Ekman MB
- 7 Carl Berkefelt MB
- 8 Alfred Brink S
- 9 Johan Gruvaeus OP
- 10 Hampus Ekstrand OS
- 11 Patrik Johansson MB
- 13 Axel Enlund OP
- 14 Jacob Link OP
- 15 Alfred Fransson L
- 17 Måns Eriksson S
- 18 Oskar von Sydow S

== Pool B ==
=== Bulgaria ===
The following is the Bulgarian roster in the 2026 European Championship.

- Head coach: (Italy) Gianlorenzo Blengini
- 1 Simeon Nikolov S
- 3 Iliya Petkov MB
- 4 Martin Atanasov OS
- 6 Zhasmin Velichkov L
- 7 Preslav Petkov MB
- 8 Asparuh Asparuhov OS
- 11 Aleks Grozdanov MB
- 12 Georgi Tatarov OS
- 15 Rusi Zhelev OS
- 18 Venislav Antov OP
- 19 Denislav Bardarov OS
- 20 Stoil Palev S
- 22 Damyan Kolev L
- 23 Aleksandar Nikolov OS

=== Israel ===
The following is the Israeli roster in the 2026 European Championship.

- Head coach: Itamar Stein
- 2 Yuval Chansky S
- 4 Itamar Peleg S
- 6 Viacheslav Batchkala MB
- 7 Iliya Goldrin OS
- 10 Noam Ariel S
- 11 Omri Alon OS
- 12 Nikita Maron MB
- 13 Omri Roitman L
- 15 Lior Vili Kopilevich MB
- 17 Ilay Haver OS
- 18 Shay Mayo Liberman OS
- 19 Mark Rura OS
- 20 Eran Halachmi L
- 37 Dovydas Grybauskas MB

=== North Macedonia ===
The following is the North Macedonia roster in the 2026 European Championship.

- Head coach: Joško Milenkoski
- 1 Filip Jovanov L
- 2 Gjorgi Gjorgiev S
- 3 Toshe Efremov OS
- 4 Nikola Gjorgiev OP
- 5 Vlado Milev OS
- 8 Aleksandar Ljaftov OS
- 10 David Stojanov S
- 14 Kristijan Ilijev OP
- 15 Filip Madjunkov MB
- 16 Stojan Iliev OS
- 17 Luka Kostikj OS
- 18 Mihajlo Miraschiev MB
- 19 Kostadin Richliev L
- 20 Filip Savovski MB

=== Poland ===
The following is the Polish roster in the 2026 European Championship.

- Head coach: (Serbia) Nikola Grbić
- 3 Jakub Popiwczak L
- 4 Marcin Komenda S
- 5 Bartłomiej Lemański MB
- 9 Wilfredo León OS
- 11 Aleksander Śliwka OS
- 12 Artur Szalpuk OS
- 16 Kamil Semeniuk OS
- 18 Maksymilian Granieczny L
- 21 Tomasz Fornal OS
- 30 Bartłomiej Bołądź OP
- 34 Szymon Jakubiszak MB
- 35 Kewin Sasak OP
- 73 Jakub Nowak MB
- 96 Jan Firlej S

=== Portugal ===
The following is the Portuguese roster in the 2026 European Championship.

- Head coach: João José
- 1 Diogo Fevereiro S
- 2 Kelton Eulávio Semedo Tavares MB
- 4 Filip Cveticanin MB
- 5 Gonçalo Gomes L
- 6 Alexandre Ferreira OS
- 7 Guilherme Menezes MB
- 8 Manuel Figueiredo OS
- 10 Gonçalo Cruz Sousa L
- 12 Lourenço Martins OS
- 14 Rodrigo Costa OP
- 16 Tomás Teixeira OP
- 17 Bruno Dias S
- 21 André Pereira OS
- 22 Nuno Teixeira MB

=== Ukraine ===
The following is the Ukrainian roster in the 2026 European Championship.

- Head coach: (Argentina) Raúl Lozano
- 2 Maksym Drozd MB
- 5 Oleh Plotnytskyi OS
- 7 Yurii Synytsia S
- 8 Dmytro Yanchuk OS
- 10 Yurii Semeniuk MB
- 12 Serhii Yevstratov S
- 13 Vasyl Tupchii OS
- 17 Oleksandr Boiko L
- 18 Tymofii Poluian OS
- 21 Yevhenii Kisiliuk OS
- 23 Denys Veletskyi MB
- 24 Yaroslav Pampushko L
- 26 Maksym Tonkonoh OP
- 27 Vladyslav Schurov MB

== Pool C ==
=== Belgium ===
The following is the Belgian roster in the 2026 European Championship.

- Head coach: (Italy) Emanuele Zanini
- 2 Ferre Reggers OP
- 3 Sam Deroo OS
- 4 Stijn D'Hulst S
- 5 Pieter Coolman MB
- 6 Simon Plaskie OS
- 8 Michiel Fransen MB
- 9 Wout D'Heer MB
- 12 Seppe Rotty OS
- 15 Basil Dermaux OP
- 16 Matthias Valkiers S
- 17 Warre Vandecruys OP
- 19 Gorik Lantsoght L
- 21 Samuel Fafchamps MB
- 24 Martijn Colson MB

=== Denmark ===
The following is the Danish roster in the 2026 European Championship.

- Head coach: Kristian Flojstrup Knudsen
- 6 Rasmus Mikelsons MB
- 8 Axel Jacobsen S
- 9 Rasmus Breuning Nielsen OP
- 10 Tobias Kjær OS
- 11 Mikkel Hoff S
- 12 Jonas Enemark Petersen L
- 13 Nikolai Stilling Denholt MB
- 14 Ulrik Bo Dahl OP
- 15 Oskar Berg Mikkelsen MB
- 18 Simon Tabermann Uhrenholt MB
- 19 Axel Juul Larsen OS
- 21 Mads Kyed Jensen OP
- 22 Oskar Kjerstein Madsen OS
- 23 Andreas Sejer Kofod Brinck OS

=== Estonia ===
The following is the Estonian roster in the 2026 European Championship.

- Head coach: Alar Rikberg
- 2 Renet Vanker S
- 6 Andres Jefanov OP
- 7 Renee Teppan OP
- 8 Märt Tammearu OS
- 10 Silver Maar L
- 12 Alari Saar L
- 15 Tristan Täht OS
- 18 Alex Saaremaa MB
- 19 Andri Aganits MB
- 24 Albert Hurt OS
- 28 Timo Ander Lõhmus OS
- 30 Marx Aru MB
- 32 Mihkel Varblane MB
- 34 Kusti Nõlvak S

=== Finland ===
The following is the Finnish roster in the 2026 European Championship.

- Head coach: Olli Kunnari
- 1 Antti Ronkainen OS
- 2 Eemi Tervaportti S
- 5 Alexej Zhbankov MB
- 6 Petteri Tyynismaa MB
- 7 Niko Suihkonen OS
- 8 Voitto Köykkä L
- 9 Santeri Välimaa S
- 10 Luka Marttila OS
- 11 Miika Haapaniemi MB
- 13 Joonas Jokela OP
- 17 Severi Savonsalmi MB
- 19 Niklas Breilin L
- 21 Nuutti Niinivaara OP
- 24 Nooa Marttila OS
- 33 Fedor Ivanov S

=== Netherlands ===
The following is the Dutch roster in the 2026 European Championship.

- Head coach: (England) Joel Banks
- 1 Siebe Korenblek MB
- 3 Michiel Ahyi OP
- 6 Sil Meijs S
- 7 Bennie Tuinstra OS
- 8 Fabian Plak MB
- 9 Joris Berkhout S
- 10 Tom Koops OS
- 11 Yannick Bak OS
- 12 Beau Wortelboer MB
- 17 Youri Ebbelaar OS
- 20 Jeffrey Klok L
- 22 Twan Wiltenburg MB
- 23 Markus Held S
- 30 Alek Aleksov L

=== Serbia ===
The following is the Serbian roster in the 2026 European Championship.

- Head coach: (Romania) Gheorghe Crețu
- 3 Stefan Negić L
- 4 Lazar Marinović OS
- 6 Vukašin Ristić L
- 8 Marko Ivović OS
- 9 Nikola Jovović S
- 10 Miran Kujundžić OS
- 11 Aleksa Batak S
- 12 Pavle Perić OS
- 15 Nemanja Mašulović MB
- 16 Dražen Luburić OP
- 19 Aleksandar Stefanović MB
- 22 Veljko Mašulović OP
- 25 Stefan Kokeza MB
- 29 Aleksandar Nedeljković MB

== Pool D ==
=== France ===
The following is the French roster in the 2026 European Championship.

- Head coach: (Italy) Andrea Giani
- 3 Amir Tizi-Oualou S
- 11 Antoine Brizard S
- 12 Stéphen Boyer OP
- 15 Mathis Henno OS
- 17 Trévor Clévenot OS
- 20 Benjamin Diez L
- 21 Théo Faure OP
- 24 Moussé Gueye MB
- 30 François Huetz MB
- 32 Daniel Iyegbekedo MB
- 33 Antoine Pothron OS
- 34 Simon Magnin MB
- 37 Luca Ramon L
- 40 Noa Duflos-Rossi OS

=== Germany ===
The following is the German roster in the 2026 European Championship.

- Head coach: (Italy) Massimo Botti
- 5 Moritz Reichert OS
- 6 Johannes Tille S
- 12 Anton Brehme MB
- 13 Ruben Schott L
- 14 Moritz Karlitzek OS
- 16 Tim Peter OS
- 17 Jan Zimmermann S
- 18 Florian Krage MB
- 21 Tobias Krick MB
- 22 Tobias Brand OS
- 31 Yann Böhme OP
- 32 Theo Mohwinkel OS
- 33 Simon Torwie MB
- 66 Erik Röhrs OS

=== Latvia ===
The following is the Latvian roster in the 2026 European Championship.

- Head coach: Uģis Krastiņš
- 2 Kaspars Kronbergs L
- 4 Tomass Silavs OS
- 5 Jānis Eduards Medenis OP
- 7 Eduards Dūdens MB
- 8 Kristaps Šmits OS
- 10 Jēkabs Dzenis MB
- 13 Edvīns Skrūders S
- 14 Kristers Landzāns OP
- 15 Armands Rokjāns OS
- 19 Kristers Dardzāns OP
- 22 Renārs Pauls Jansons OP
- 27 Artūrs Gulovs L
- 31 Markuss Vensbergs S
- 92 Gustavs Freimanis MB

=== Romania ===
The following is the Romanian roster in the 2026 European Championship.

- Head coach: Sergiu Stancu
- 1 Bela Bartha MB
- 2 Sergio Diaconescu L
- 5 David Emilian Țăranu-Runcan OP
- 6 Claudiu Dumitru S
- 7 Rareș Bălean OS
- 8 Victor-Ștefan Asmarandei MB
- 9 Adrian Aciobăniței OS
- 10 Tudor Magdaș MB
- 11 Carol-Gabriel Kosinski L
- 12 Marian Iulian Bala OS
- 13 Alexandru Rață OP
- 15 Sebastian Gabriel Bratu S
- 23 Ștefan Lupu MB
- 99 Cristian-Daniel Chițigo OS

=== Switzerland ===
The following is the Suisse roster in the 2026 European Championship.

- Head coach: (Argentina) Juan Manuel Serramalera
- 2 Peer Harksen S
- 3 Julian Fischer L
- 4 Bruno Jukic-Sunaric OS
- 6 Étienne Schalch OP
- 8 Quentin Zeller OS
- 9 Cyril Kolb OS
- 12 Joel Hauck MB
- 13 Simon Maag MB
- 14 Fabrice Egger S
- 15 Julian Weisigk OP
- 16 Dominic Lauener MB
- 17 Alexander Lengweiler MB
- 20 Lars Migge OS
- 21 Jonas Peter L

=== Turkey ===
The following is the Turkish roster in the 2026 European Championship.

- Head coach: (Serbia) Slobodan Kovač
- 1 Kaan Gürbüz OP
- 3 Ahmet Tümer MB
- 4 Ahmet Samet Baltacı MB
- 5 Mert Matić MB
- 6 Gökçen Yüksel OS
- 8 Cafer Kirkit OS
- 10 Mirza Lagumdzija OP
- 12 Adis Lagumdzija OP
- 15 Abdulsamet Yalçın L
- 17 Murat Yenipazar S
- 19 Berkay Bayraktar L
- 20 Efe Bayram OS
- 23 Yunus Emre Tayaz MB
- 33 Hilmi Şahin S
