= Volleyball at the 2024 Summer Olympics – Men's team rosters =

This article shows the roster of all participating teams for the men's indoor volleyball tournament at the 2024 Summer Olympics.

== Pool A ==
=== Canada ===
The roster was announced on 8 July 2024.

Head coach: (Finland) Tuomas Sammelvuo

- 2 Luke Herr S
- 4 Nicholas Hoag (c) OH
- 5 Brodie Hofer OH
- 6 Danny Demyanenko MB
- 7 Stephen Maar OH
- 8 Brett Walsh S
- 11 Xander Ketrzynski OP
- 12 Lucas Van Berkel MB
- 14 Arthur Szwarc OP
- 18 Justin Lui L
- 33 Fynn McCarthy MB
- 80 Eric Loeppky OH

Alternate:

- 17 Ryley Barnes L

=== France ===
The roster was announced on 8 July 2024.

Head coach: (Italy) Andrea Giani

- 1 Barthélémy Chinenyeze MB
- 2 Jenia Grebennikov L
- 4 Jean Patry OP
- 6 Benjamin Toniutti (c) S
- 7 Kévin Tillie OH
- 9 Earvin N'Gapeth OH
- 11 Antoine Brizard S
- 14 Nicolas Le Goff MB
- 17 Trévor Clévenot OH
- 19 Yacine Louati OH
- 21 Théo Faure OP
- 25 Quentin Jouffroy MB

Alternate:

- 23 Timothée Carle OH

=== Serbia ===
The roster was announced on 8 July 2024.

Head coach: (Montenegro) Igor Kolaković

- 2 Uroš Kovačević (c) OH
- 3 Milorad Kapur L
- 7 Petar Krsmanović MB
- 8 Marko Ivović OH
- 9 Nikola Jovović S
- 10 Miran Kujundžić OH
- 12 Pavle Perić OH
- 14 Aleksandar Atanasijević OP
- 16 Dražen Luburić OP
- 18 Marko Podraščanin MB
- 21 Vuk Todorović S
- 29 Aleksandar Nedeljković MB

Alternate:

- Nemanja Mašulović MB

=== Slovenia ===
The roster was announced on 8 July 2024.

Head coach: (Romania) Gheorghe Crețu

- 1 Tonček Štern OP
- 2 Alen Pajenk MB
- 4 Jan Kozamernik MB
- 9 Dejan Vinčić S
- 10 Sašo Štalekar MB
- 13 Jani Kovačič L
- 14 Žiga Štern OH
- 16 Gregor Ropret S
- 17 Tine Urnaut (c) OH
- 18 Klemen Čebulj OH
- 19 Rok Možič OH
- 20 Nik Mujanović OP

Alternate:

- 3 Uroš Planinšič S

== Pool B ==
=== Brazil ===
The roster was announced on 7 July 2024.

Head coach: Bernardo Rezende

- 1 Bruno Rezende (c) S
- 2 Lukas Bergmann OH
- 6 Adriano Xavier OH
- 9 Yoandy Leal OH
- 12 Isac Santos MB
- 14 Fernando Kreling S
- 16 Lucas Saatkamp MB
- 17 Thales Hoss L
- 18 Ricardo Lucarelli OH
- 21 Alan Souza OP
- 23 Flávio Gualberto MB
- 28 Darlan Souza OP

Alternate:

- 8 Henrique Honorato OH

=== Egypt ===
The roster was announced on 9 July 2024.

Head coach: (Spain) Fernando Muñoz

- 2 Ahmed Azab Abdelrahman OH
- 5 Mohamed Osman Elhaddad MB
- 6 Mohamed Hassan L
- 8 Abdelrahman Elhossiny Eissa OH
- 9 Mohamed Sayedin Asran OH
- 10 Mohamed Masoud MB
- 12 Hossam Abdalla (c) S
- 14 Seifeldin Hassan Aly OP
- 15 Abdelrahman Seoudy MB
- 16 Mostafa Gaber Abdelsalam Abdelmoaty S
- 17 Reda Haikal OP
- 22 Mohamed Moustafa Issa OH

Alternate:

- 23 Ahmed Omar OH

=== Italy ===
The roster was announced on 8 July 2024.

Head coach: Ferdinando De Giorgi

- 5 Alessandro Michieletto OH
- 6 Simone Giannelli (c) S
- 7 Fabio Balaso L
- 8 Riccardo Sbertoli S
- 11 Giovanni Sanguinetti MB
- 12 Mattia Bottolo OH
- 14 Gianluca Galassi MB
- 15 Daniele Lavia OH
- 16 Yuri Romanò OP
- 19 Roberto Russo MB
- 23 Alessandro Bovolenta OP
- 31 Luca Porro OH

Alternate:

- 28 Gabriele Laurenzano L

=== Poland ===
The roster was announced on 8 July 2024.

Head coach: (Serbia) Nikola Grbić

- 5 Łukasz Kaczmarek OP
- 6 Bartosz Kurek (c) OP
- 9 Wilfredo León OH
- 11 Aleksander Śliwka OH
- 12 Grzegorz Łomacz S
- 15 Jakub Kochanowski MB
- 16 Kamil Semeniuk OH
- 17 Paweł Zatorski L
- 19 Marcin Janusz S
- 20 Mateusz Bieniek MB
- 21 Tomasz Fornal OH
- 30 Bartłomiej Bołądź OP
- 99 Norbert Huber MB

== Pool C ==
=== Argentina ===
The roster was announced on 3 July 2024.

Head coach: Marcelo Méndez

- 1 Matías Sánchez S
- 3 Jan Martínez Franchi OH
- 7 Facundo Conte OH
- 8 Agustín Loser MB
- 9 Santiago Danani L
- 12 Bruno Lima OP
- 15 Luciano De Cecco (c) S
- 16 Pablo Kukartsev OP
- 17 Luciano Vicentín OH
- 18 Martín Ramos MB
- 21 Luciano Palonsky OH
- 22 Nicolás Zerba MB

Alternate:

- 13 Ezequiel Palacios OH

=== Germany ===
The roster was announced on 28 June 2024.

Head coach: (Poland) Michał Winiarski

- 1 Christian Fromm OH
- 5 Moritz Reichert OH
- 6 Johannes Tille S
- 9 György Grozer OP
- 10 Julian Zenger L
- 11 Lukas Kampa (c) S
- 12 Anton Brehme MB
- 13 Ruben Schott OH
- 14 Moritz Karlitzek OH
- 21 Tobias Krick MB
- 22 Tobias Brand OH
- 25 Lukas Maase MB

Alternate:

- 17 Jan Zimmermann S

=== Japan ===
The roster was announced on 24 June 2024.

Head coach: (France) Philippe Blain

- 1 Yuji Nishida OP
- 2 Taishi Onodera MB
- 3 Akihiro Fukatsu S
- 4 Kento Miyaura OH
- 5 Tatsunori Otsuka OH
- 6 Akihiro Yamauchi MB
- 8 Masahiro Sekita S
- 10 Kentaro Takahashi MB
- 12 Ran Takahashi OH
- 14 Yūki Ishikawa (c) OH
- 15 Masato Kai OH
- 20 Tomohiro Yamamoto L

Alternate:

- 11 Shoma Tomita OH

=== United States ===
The roster was announced on 10 May 2024.

Head coach: John Speraw

- 1 Matt Anderson OP
- 2 Aaron Russell OH
- 4 Jeffrey Jendryk MB
- 8 Torey DeFalco OH
- 11 Micah Christenson (c) S
- 12 Maxwell Holt MB
- 14 Micah Maʻa S
- 17 Thomas Jaeschke OH
- 18 Garrett Muagututia OH
- 19 Taylor Averill MB
- 20 David Smith MB
- 22 Erik Shoji L

Alternate:

- 5 Kyle Ensing OP

== See also ==
- Volleyball at the 2024 Summer Olympics – Women's team rosters
