= 2023–24 Polish Men's Volleyball Cup =

2023–24 Polish Volleyball Cup
- Sport: Volleyball
- Duration: 2–3 March 2024
- Total attendance: 33,342 (11,114 per match)
- TV partner: Polsat Sport

Finals
- Champions: Warta Zawiercie (1st title)
- Finals MVP: Miłosz Zniszczoł (POL)

Seasons
- ← 2022–23 2024–25 →

The 2023–24 Polish Cup was the 67th edition of the Polish Volleyball Cup tournament.

Aluron CMC Warta Zawiercie beat Jastrzębski Węgiel in the final (3–1) and won their maiden Polish Cup. Miłosz Zniszczoł was named MVP of the finals.

== Final four ==
- Venue: Tauron Arena, Kraków
- All times are Central European Time (UTC+01:00).

Semifinals
2 March
Jastrzębski Węgiel	3
Bogdanka LUK Lublin	0
2 March
Projekt Warsaw	0
Aluron CMC Warta Zawiercie	3

Final
3 March
Jastrzębski Węgiel	1
Aluron CMC Warta Zawiercie	3

=== Semifinals ===
Date	Time		Score		Set 1	Set 2	Set 3	Set 4	Set 5	Total	Report
2 Mar	14:45	Jastrzębski Węgiel	3–0	Bogdanka LUK Lublin	25–21	25–23	25–18			75–62	Report
2 Mar	18:00	Projekt Warsaw	0–3	Aluron CMC Warta Zawiercie	18–25	24–26	27–29			69–80	Report

=== Final ===
Date	Time		Score		Set 1	Set 2	Set 3	Set 4	Set 5	Total	Report
3 Mar	14:45	Jastrzębski Węgiel	1–3	Aluron CMC Warta Zawiercie	22–25	25–20	21–25	20–25		88–95	Report

== Final standings ==
Qualified for the 2024 Polish SuperCup

Rank	Team
1st place, gold medalist(s)	Aluron CMC Warta Zawiercie
2	Jastrzębski Węgiel
Semifinalists	Bogdanka LUK Lublin; Projekt Warsaw

2023–24 Polish Cup winners
Aluron CMC Warta Zawiercie
1st title

== Squads ==
Aluron CMC Warta Zawiercie
No.	Name	Date of birth	Height	Position
2	(Poland) Bartosz Kwolek	17 July 1997	1.93 m (6 ft 4 in)	outside hitter
4	(Australia) Luke Perry	20 November 1995	1.80 m (5 ft 11 in)	libero
5	(Poland) Miłosz Zniszczoł	2 July 1986	2.00 m (6 ft 7 in)	middle blocker
6	(Poland) Mariusz Schamlewski	16 January 1991	1.98 m (6 ft 6 in)	middle blocker
7	(Poland) Szymon Gregorowicz	7 March 1994	1.83 m (6 ft 0 in)	libero
8	(Poland) Tomasz Kalembka	30 June 1991	2.05 m (6 ft 9 in)	middle blocker
9	(Poland) Daniel Gąsior	9 January 1995	2.00 m (6 ft 7 in)	opposite
10	(France) Thibault Rossard	28 August 1993	1.94 m (6 ft 4 in)	outside hitter
13	(Canada) Samuel Cooper	17 June 2001	2.00 m (6 ft 7 in)	outside hitter
15	(Portugal) Miguel Tavares	2 March 1993	1.92 m (6 ft 4 in)	setter
17	(France) Trévor Clévenot	28 June 1994	1.99 m (6 ft 6 in)	outside hitter
18	(Poland) Michał Kozłowski	16 February 1985	1.91 m (6 ft 3 in)	setter
20	(Poland) Mateusz Bieniek	5 April 1994	2.08 m (6 ft 10 in)	middle blocker
21	(Poland) Karol Butryn	18 June 1993	1.94 m (6 ft 4 in)	opposite
25	(Poland) Michał Szalacha	15 January 1994	2.02 m (6 ft 8 in)	middle blocker
99	(Poland) Patryk Łaba	30 July 1991	1.88 m (6 ft 2 in)	outside hitter
Head coach:		(Poland) Michał Winiarski		

Bogdanka LUK Lublin
No.	Name	Date of birth	Height	Position
1	(Poland) Jan Nowakowski	17 May 1994	2.02 m (6 ft 8 in)	middle blocker
2	(Poland) Maksym Kędzierski	13 March 2003	1.83 m (6 ft 0 in)	libero
3	(Poland) Maciej Krysiak	7 January 1999	1.92 m (6 ft 4 in)	outside hitter
4	(Poland) Marcin Komenda	24 May 1996	1.98 m (6 ft 6 in)	setter
5	(Poland) Marcin Kania	14 February 1996	2.03 m (6 ft 8 in)	middle blocker
6	(Poland) Mateusz Malinowski	6 May 1992	1.98 m (6 ft 6 in)	opposite
7	(Poland) Jakub Wachnik	16 February 1993	2.02 m (6 ft 8 in)	outside hitter
9	(Portugal) Alexandre Ferreira	13 November 1991	2.00 m (6 ft 7 in)	outside hitter
10	(Germany) Tobias Brand	9 July 1998	1.95 m (6 ft 5 in)	outside hitter
11	(Poland) Jakub Nowosielski	11 February 1993	1.93 m (6 ft 4 in)	setter
17	(Brazil) Thales Hoss	26 April 1989	1.90 m (6 ft 3 in)	libero
18	(Poland) Damian Schulz	26 February 1990	2.08 m (6 ft 10 in)	opposite
20	(Poland) Maciej Zając	5 March 2003	1.98 m (6 ft 6 in)	middle blocker
23	(Poland) Damian Hudzik	14 May 1998	2.04 m (6 ft 8 in)	middle blocker
Head coach:		(Italy) Massimo Botti		

Jastrzębski Węgiel
No.	Name	Date of birth	Height	Position
2	(Latvia) Edvīns Skrūders	13 November 1997	1.88 m (6 ft 2 in)	setter
3	(Poland) Jakub Popiwczak	17 April 1996	1.80 m (5 ft 11 in)	libero
4	(Poland) Adrian Markiewicz	12 April 2002	2.11 m (6 ft 11 in)	middle blocker
6	(France) Benjamin Toniutti	30 October 1989	1.83 m (6 ft 0 in)	setter
7	(Croatia) Marko Sedlaček	29 July 1996	2.02 m (6 ft 8 in)	outside hitter
9	(France) Jean Patry	27 December 1996	2.07 m (6 ft 9 in)	opposite
10	(Canada) Ryan Sclater	3 June 1991	1.99 m (6 ft 6 in)	opposite
13	(Poland) Yuriy Gladyr	8 July 1984	2.02 m (6 ft 8 in)	middle blocker
16	(Poland) Bartosz Makoś	1 August 1998	1.76 m (5 ft 9 in)	libero
17	(Poland) Jarosław Macionczyk	22 January 1979	1.90 m (6 ft 3 in)	setter
21	(Poland) Tomasz Fornal	31 August 1997	2.00 m (6 ft 7 in)	outside hitter
22	(Poland) Moustapha M'Baye	22 January 1992	1.98 m (6 ft 6 in)	middle blocker
26	(Poland) Rafał Szymura	29 August 1995	1.97 m (6 ft 6 in)	outside hitter
31	(Poland) Mateusz Jóźwik	30 May 1996	1.95 m (6 ft 5 in)	outside hitter
99	(Poland) Norbert Huber	14 August 1998	2.07 m (6 ft 9 in)	middle blocker
Head coach:		(Argentina) Marcelo Méndez		

Projekt Warsaw
No.	Name	Date of birth	Height	Position
1	(Poland) Jakub Kowalczyk	26 June 1986	2.00 m (6 ft 7 in)	middle blocker
3	(Serbia) Srećko Lisinac	17 May 1992	2.05 m (6 ft 9 in)	middle blocker
4	(Poland) Maciej Stępień	22 June 1994	1.93 m (6 ft 4 in)	setter
5	(Poland) Jan Firlej	26 September 1996	1.88 m (6 ft 2 in)	setter
7	(France) Kévin Tillie	2 November 1990	2.01 m (6 ft 7 in)	outside hitter
8	(Poland) Andrzej Wrona	27 December 1988	2.06 m (6 ft 9 in)	middle blocker
9	(Poland) Bartłomiej Bołądź	28 September 1994	2.04 m (6 ft 8 in)	opposite
10	(Ukraine) Yurii Semeniuk	12 May 1994	2.10 m (6 ft 11 in)	middle blocker
11	(Poland) Piotr Nowakowski	18 December 1987	2.05 m (6 ft 9 in)	middle blocker
12	(Poland) Artur Szalpuk	20 March 1995	2.02 m (6 ft 8 in)	outside hitter
13	(Belgium) Igor Grobelny	8 June 1993	1.94 m (6 ft 4 in)	outside hitter
16	(Poland) Jędrzej Gruszczyński	13 November 1997	1.86 m (6 ft 1 in)	libero
18	(Poland) Damian Wojtaszek	7 September 1988	1.80 m (5 ft 11 in)	libero
19	(United States) Taylor Averill	5 March 1992	2.01 m (6 ft 7 in)	middle blocker
20	(Germany) Linus Weber	1 November 1999	2.01 m (6 ft 7 in)	opposite
22	(Poland) Karol Borkowski	14 February 1998	1.95 m (6 ft 5 in)	outside hitter
Head coach:		(Poland) Piotr Graban		

== See also ==
- 2023–24 PlusLiga
