= Luke Perry (volleyball) =

Australian volleyball player (born 1995)

Personal information
- Born: 20 November 1995 (age 30); Murdoch, Australia
- Height: 1.80 m (5 ft 11 in)
- Weight: 75 kg (165 lb)

Volleyball information
- Position: Libero
- Current club: Modena Volley

Career
Years	Teams
2014–2015; 2015–2016; 2016–2018; 2018–2020; 2021–2022; 2022–2023; 2023–2025; 2025–	Team Lakkapää; VfB Friedrichshafen; Berlin Recycling Volleys; Asseco Resovia; Tours VB; Trefl Gdańsk; Warta Zawiercie; Modena Volley

National team
Australia
Honours
Men's volleyball
Representing Australia
AVC Asian Championship
Silver medal – second place	2019 Tehran

Luke Perry (born 20 November 1995) is an Australian professional volleyball player who plays as a libero for and captains both Lega Pallavolo Serie A club Modena Volley and the Australia national team.

== Career ==
He began playing volleyball in 2009 for his school. In late 2012, he accepted a scholarship to the AIS (Australian Institute of Sport), in Canberra, where he began training full-time in volleyball. In 2013, he was selected as part of the Volleyroos. He played for Team Lakkapää in Finland in 2014–15, and then in 2015–16 joined VfB Friedrichshafen in Germany. In 2018, he joined Asseco Resovia.

== Honours ==
=== Club ===
- CEV Champions League
  - 2024–25 – with Aluron CMC Warta Zawiercie
- CEV Cup
  - 2021–22 – with Tours VB
- Domestic
  - 2015–16 German SuperCup, with Berlin Recycling Volleys
  - 2016–17 German Championship, with Berlin Recycling Volleys
  - 2017–18 German Championship, with Berlin Recycling Volleys
  - 2023–24 Polish Cup, with Aluron CMC Warta Zawiercie
  - 2024–25 Polish SuperCup, with Aluron CMC Warta Zawiercie

=== Statistics ===
- 2022–23 PlusLiga – Best receiver
