= Médéric Henry =

French volleyball player (born 1995)

Personal information
- Nationality: French
- Born: 20 June 1995 (age 31)
- Height: 212 cm (6 ft 11 in)
- Weight: 106 kg (234 lb)
- Spike: 345 cm (136 in)
- Block: 327 cm (129 in)

Volleyball information
- Number: 3 (national team)

Career
Years	Teams
2015	Nantes

National team
2015	France

Médéric Henry (born 20 June 1995) is a French male volleyball player. He is part of the France men's national volleyball team. On club level he plays for Arago de Sète.
