= Nicolás Méndez =

Argentine volleyball player (born 1992)

Nicolás Marcelo Méndez
- Méndez in 2021

Personal information
- Full name: Nicolás Marcelo Méndez
- Nickname: Nico
- Born: 2 November 1992 (age 33); Buenos Aires, Argentina
- Height: 1.91 m (6 ft 3 in)
- Weight: 90 kg (198 lb)
- Spike: 340 cm (134 in)
- Block: 326 cm (128 in)

Volleyball information
- Position: Outside hitter
- Current club: (France) Paris Volley
- Number: 17 (national team)

Career
Years	Teams
2008-2009; 2009-2010; 2010-2011; 2011-2012; 2012-2013; 2014-2015, 2017-2018; 2018-2019; 2019-2020; 2021-2023; 2023-	(Spain) Club Voleibol Pòrtol (Argentina) River Plate (Argentina) Bolívar Voley (Argentina) MSM Bella Vista (Argentina) UNTREF Vóley (France) Arago de Sète (France) GFC Ajaccio Volley-Ball (France) Montpellier UC (France) Paris Volley (France) Tours Volley-Ball

National team
2013-	Argentina
Honours
Men's volleyball
Representing Argentina
Olympic Games
Bronze medal – third place	2020 Tokyo	Team
Pan American Cup
Bronze medal – third place	2013 Mexico City

Nicolás Marcelo Méndez (born November 2, 1992) is an Argentine volleyball player, member of the Argentina men's national volleyball team and French club Paris Volley, participant of the Olympic Games, (Tokyo 2020). His father, Marcelo Méndez, is the current head coach of the Argentine national team.

== Career ==
Méndez made his first major world tournament debut on the senior national team in 2019. He was named to the 2020 Summer Olympic squad.

On the professional league level, he currently plays for Paris Volley.
