= Samuel Cooper (volleyball) =

Canadian volleyball player (born 2001)

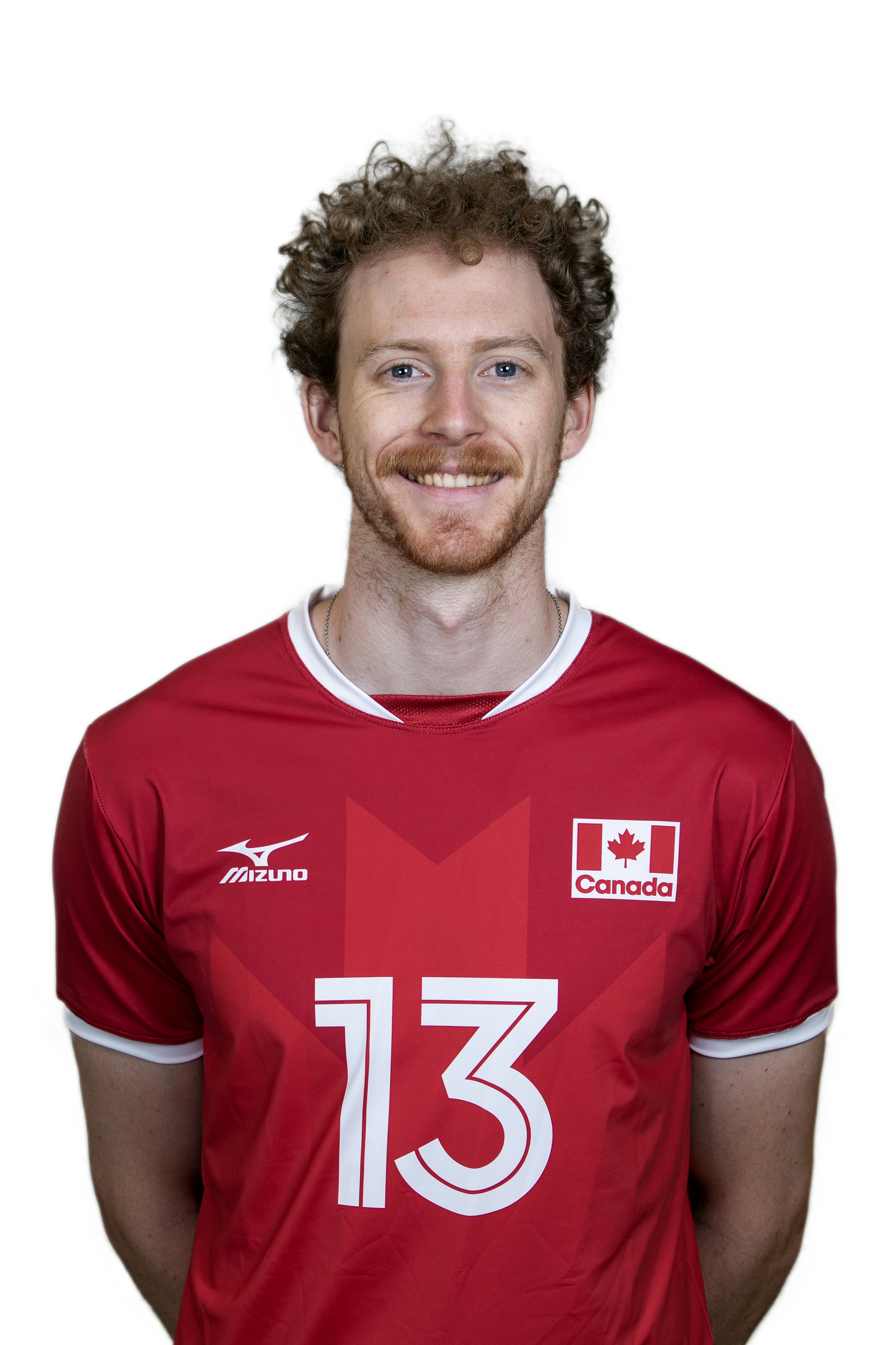
- Cooper with Team Canada in 2023

Personal information
- Nationality: Canadian
- Born: 17 June 2001 (age 25); Ann Arbor, Michigan, U.S.
- Hometown: Hamilton, Ontario
- Height: 1.98 m (6 ft 6 in)
- Weight: 100 kg (220 lb)
- Spike: 357 cm (141 in)
- Block: 325 cm (128 in)
- Education: McMaster University

Volleyball information
- Position: Outside hitter
- Current club: Free Agent
- Number: 13

Career
Years	Teams
2019–2023	McMaster University
2023–2024	Warta Zawiercie

National team
Canada

Samuel Cooper (born 17 June 2001) is a Canadian volleyball player. He is a member of the Canadian national team and competed for Canada at the 2023 FIVB Volleyball Men's Olympic Qualification Tournaments as they qualified for the 2024 Summer Olympics.

In 2024, Cooper won the Polish Men's Volleyball Cup as a member of Warta Zawiercie.

== Personal life ==
Cooper was born on 17 June 2001 in Ann Arbor, Michigan, to Nathan and Carmen Cooper. He has four siblings - Aidan, Noah, Matthias, and Seth.

He is a close friend of Soren Cowie, Sabian Crosswell, Tadgh Taylor-McGreal, Max Gratton, Maurice El-Helhou, and cousins to Josiah Bosch.

== Honours ==
=== Club ===
- 2023–24 Polish Cup, with Aluron CMC Warta Zawiercie

=== National ===
- 2022 Pan American Cup
- 2023 NORCECA Championship

=== University ===
- 2019-20 Ontario University Athletics
- 2021-22 Ontario University Athletics
- 2022-23 U Sports
- 2022-23 Ontario University Athletics
