= Bennie Tuinstra =

Dutch volleyball player (born 2000)

Personal information
- Full name: Bennie Junior Tuinstra
- Born: 12 September 2000 (age 26); Sneek, Netherlands
- Height: 2.00 m (6 ft 7 in)
- Weight: 90 kg (198 lb)
- Spike: 350 cm (138 in)
- Block: 335 cm (132 in)

Volleyball information
- Position: Outside hitter

Career
Years	Teams
2018–2019; 2019–2021; 2021–2024; 2024–2025	Tourcoing LM; Lycurgus Groningen; Ziraat Bankası Ankara; LUK Lublin

National team
Netherlands

Bennie Junior Tuinstra (born 12 September 2000) is a Dutch professional volleyball player who plays as an outside hitter for the Netherlands national team.

== Honours ==
=== Club ===
- CEV Challenge Cup
  - 2024–25 – with Bogdanka LUK Lublin
- Domestic
  - 2019–20 Dutch Cup, with Lycurgus Groningen
  - 2020–21 Dutch SuperCup, with Lycurgus Groningen
  - 2020–21 Dutch Cup, with Lycurgus Groningen
  - 2021–22 Turkish SuperCup, with Ziraat Bankası Ankara
  - 2021–22 Turkish Championship, with Ziraat Bankası Ankara
  - 2022–23 Turkish SuperCup, with Ziraat Bankası Ankara
  - 2022–23 Turkish Championship, with Ziraat Bankası Ankara
  - 2023–24 Turkish SuperCup, with Ziraat Bankası Ankara
  - 2024–25 Polish Championship, with Bogdanka LUK Lublin

=== Individual awards ===
- 2018: CEV U20 European Championship – Best outside spiker
