= Karol Butryn =

Polish volleyball player (born 1993)

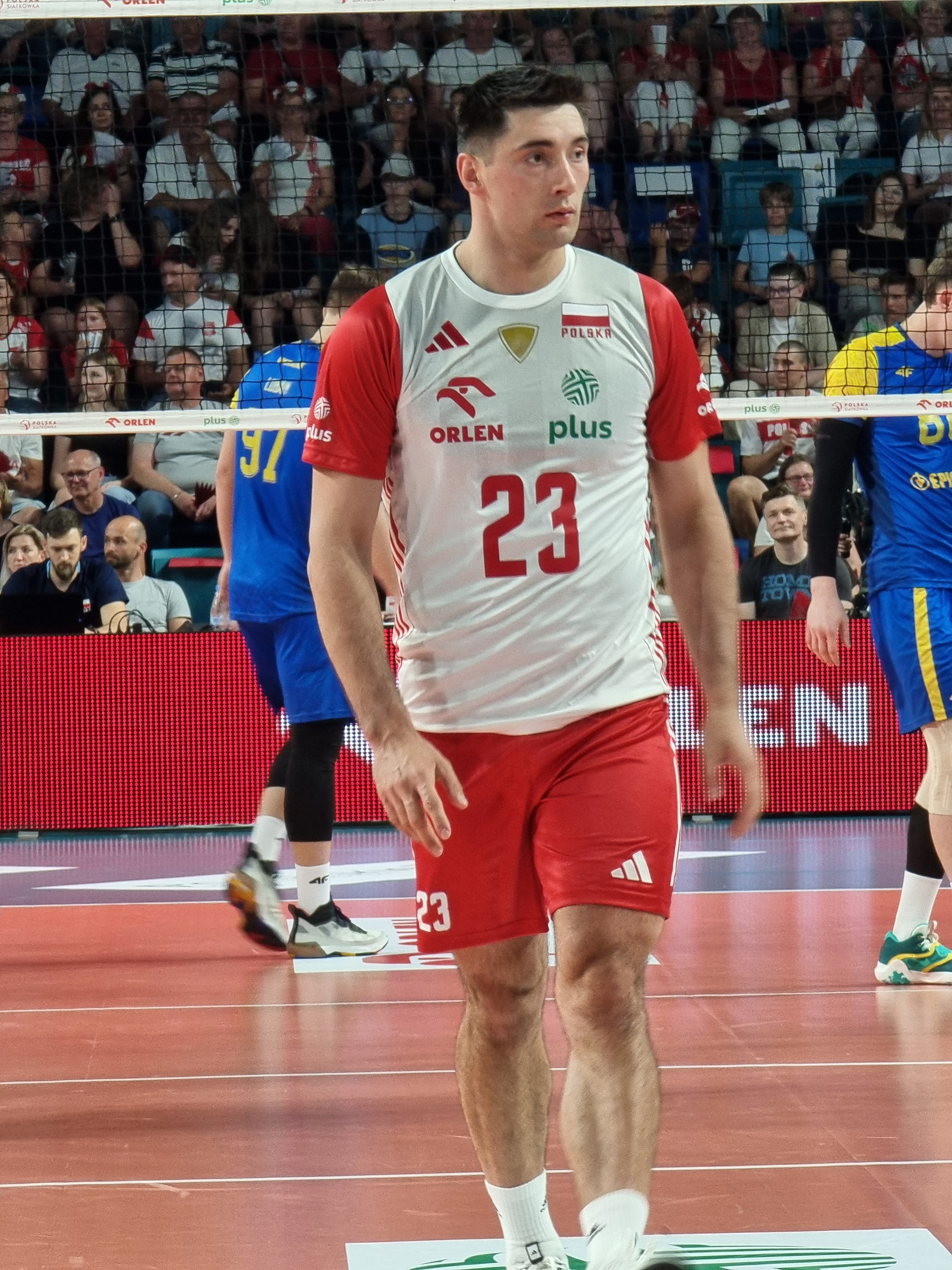
- Butryn in 2024

Personal information
- Born: 18 June 1993 (age 33); Puławy, Poland
- Height: 1.94 m (6 ft 4 in)
- Weight: 99 kg (218 lb)
- Spike: 345 cm (136 in)

Volleyball information
- Position: Opposite
- Current club: Asseco Resovia
- Number: 21

Career
Years	Teams
2014–2015; 2015–2019; 2019–2020; 2020–2021; 2021–2023; 2023–2025; 2025–	KPS Siedlce; GKS Katowice; Czarni Radom; Asseco Resovia; AZS Olsztyn; Warta Zawiercie; Asseco Resovia

National team
2022–	Poland
Honours
Men's volleyball
Representing Poland
FIVB Nations League
Bronze medal – third place	2022 Bologna

Karol Butryn (born 18 June 1993) is a Polish professional volleyball player who plays as an opposite spiker for Asseco Resovia and the Poland national team.

== Honours ==
=== Club ===
- CEV Champions League
  - 2024–25 – with Aluron CMC Warta Zawiercie
- Domestic
  - 2023–24 Polish Cup, with Aluron CMC Warta Zawiercie
  - 2024–25 Polish SuperCup, with Aluron CMC Warta Zawiercie

=== Statistics ===
- 2020–21 PlusLiga – Best scorer (552 points)
- 2020–21 PlusLiga – Best spiker (470 points)
