= Manuel Armoa =

Argentine volleyball player (born 2002)

Personal information
- Full name: Manuel Armoa Morel
- Born: 1 December 2002 (age 23); Buenos Aires, Argentina
- Height: 1.98 m (6 ft 6 in)
- Weight: 84 kg (185 lb)

Volleyball information
- Position: Outside hitter

Career
Years	Teams
2018–2023; 2023–2025	UPCN Vóley Club; AZS Olsztyn

National team
2022–	Argentina
Honours
Men's volleyball
Representing Argentina
CSV South American Championship
Gold medal – first place	2023 Recife

Manuel Armoa Morel (born 1 December 2002) is an Argentine professional volleyball player who plays as an outside hitter for the Argentina national team.

He made his debut in the senior national team during the 2022 Nations League against Poland.

== Personal life ==
Both his parents are connected to volleyball: his adoptive father, Fabián Armoa, is a volleyball coach and his mother Carla Morel is a former Argentina national team member.

At CSV Qualifying Tournament to 2023 Pan American Games in Santiago de Chile, during a match between the Argentine and Chilean U23 sides, Armoa was subject to racist abuse from the audience, and a bottle was thrown at him from the stands. The game had to be briefly stopped and the Chilean team later apologized to Armoa on behalf of their country.

== Honours ==
=== Club ===
- CSV South American Club Championship
  - Belo Horizonte 2019 – with UPCN Vóley Club
  - Contagem 2020 – with UPCN Vóley Club
- Domestic
  - 2019–20 Argentine Cup, with UPCN Vóley Club
  - 2020–21 Argentine Cup, with UPCN Vóley Club
  - 2020–21 Argentine Championship, with UPCN Vóley Club
  - 2021–22 Argentine Championship, with UPCN Vóley Club
  - 2022–23 Argentine SuperCup, with UPCN Vóley Club

=== Youth national team ===
- 2018 CSV U19 South American Championship

=== Individual awards ===
- 2021: FIVB U21 World Championship – Best outside spiker
