= Benjamin Diez =

French volleyball player (born 1998)

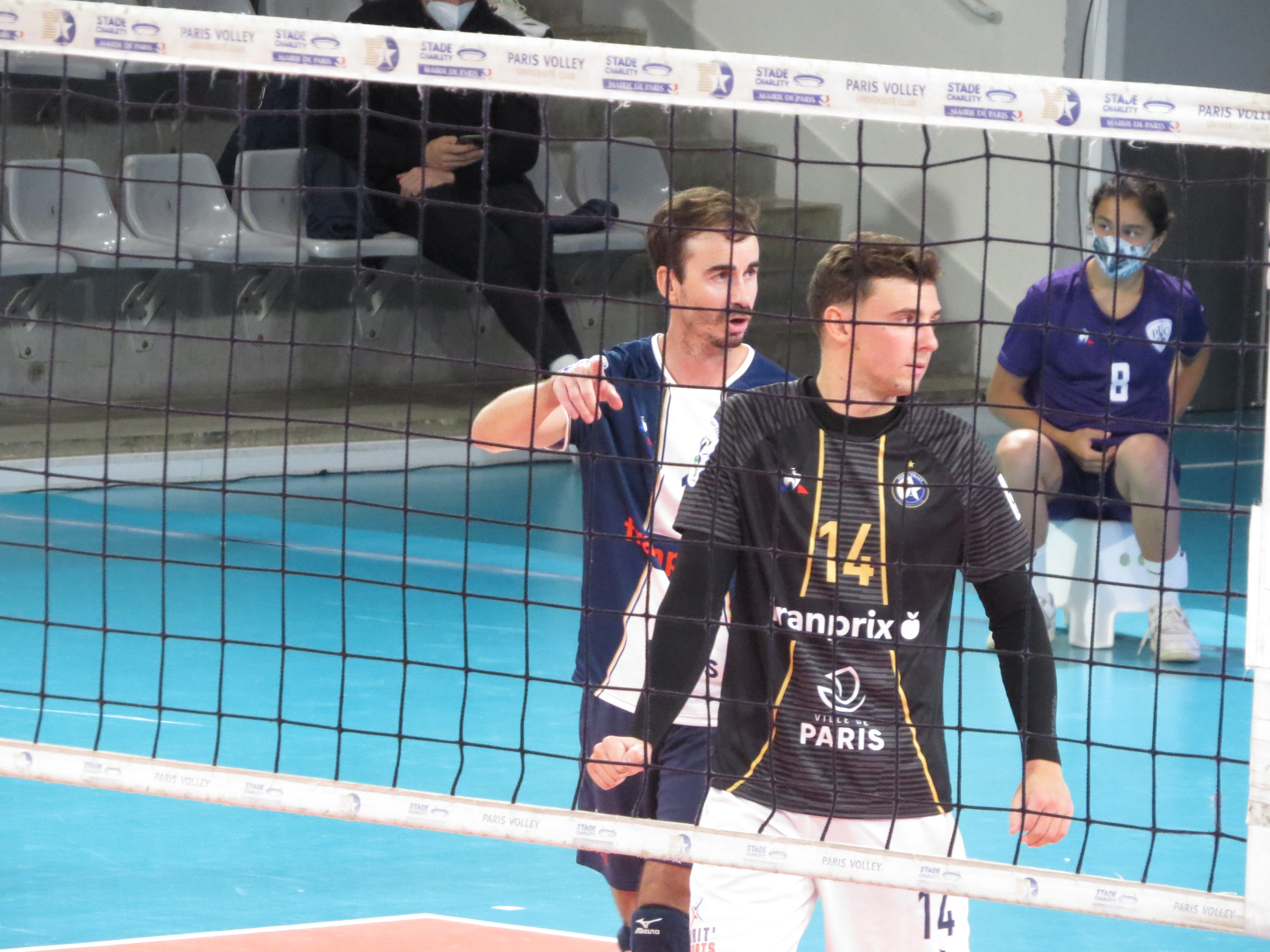
- Diez as Paris Volley player (14)

Personal information
- Born: 4 April 1998 (age 28); Nice, France
- Height: 1.83 m (6 ft 0 in)
- Weight: 76 kg (168 lb)

Volleyball information
- Position: Libero
- Current club: Pallavolo Padova

Career
Years	Teams
2016–2018; 2018–2020; 2020–2022; 2021; 2022–2023; 2023–2024; 2024–	AS Cannes; Montpellier Volley; Paris Volley; Chênois Genève; Tours VB; Skra Bełchatów; Pallavolo Padova

National team
France
Honours
Men's volleyball
Representing France
FIVB Nations League
Gold medal – first place	2022 Bologna
Gold medal – first place	2024 Łódź
Bronze medal – third place	2021 Rimini
CEV European Championship
Silver medal – second place	2026 Bulgaria/Finland/Italy/Romania

Benjamin Diez (born 4 April 1998) is a French professional volleyball player who plays as a libero for Pallavolo Padova and the France national team, with which he won bronze and gold Nations League medals in 2021 and 2022.

Diez has played for some of the most successful clubs in his homeland such as Montpellier Volley, Paris Volley and Tours VB.

== Honours ==
=== Club ===
- Domestic
  - 2020–21 Swiss Championship, with Chênois Genève
  - 2022–23 French Cup, with Tours VB
  - 2022–23 French Championship, with Tours VB
