= Brodie Hofer =

Canadian volleyball player (born 2000)

Personal information
- Nationality: Canadian
- Born: 27 April 2000 (age 26); Kelowna, British Columbia, Canada
- Hometown: Langley, British Columbia
- Height: 1.99 m (6 ft 6 in)
- Weight: 92 kg (203 lb)
- Spike: 358 cm (11 ft 9 in)
- Block: 330 cm (10 ft 10 in)
- Education: Trinity Western University

Volleyball information
- Position: Outside hitter
- Current club: Prisma Volley
- Number: 5

Career
Years	Teams
2018–2023; 2023–2024; 2024–	Trinity Western Spartans; Enea Czarni Radom; Prisma Volley

National team
2018–2019; 2021–	Canada U21; Canada
Honours
Men's volleyball
Representing Canada
NORCECA Championship
Silver medal – second place	2021 Durango City
- Last updated: 14 August 2024

Brodie Hofer (born 27 April 2000) is a Canadian volleyball player. He is a member of the Canadian national team and competed for Canada at the 2023 FIVB Volleyball Men's Olympic Qualification Tournaments.
