= Henrique Honorato =

Brazilian volleyball player (born 1997)

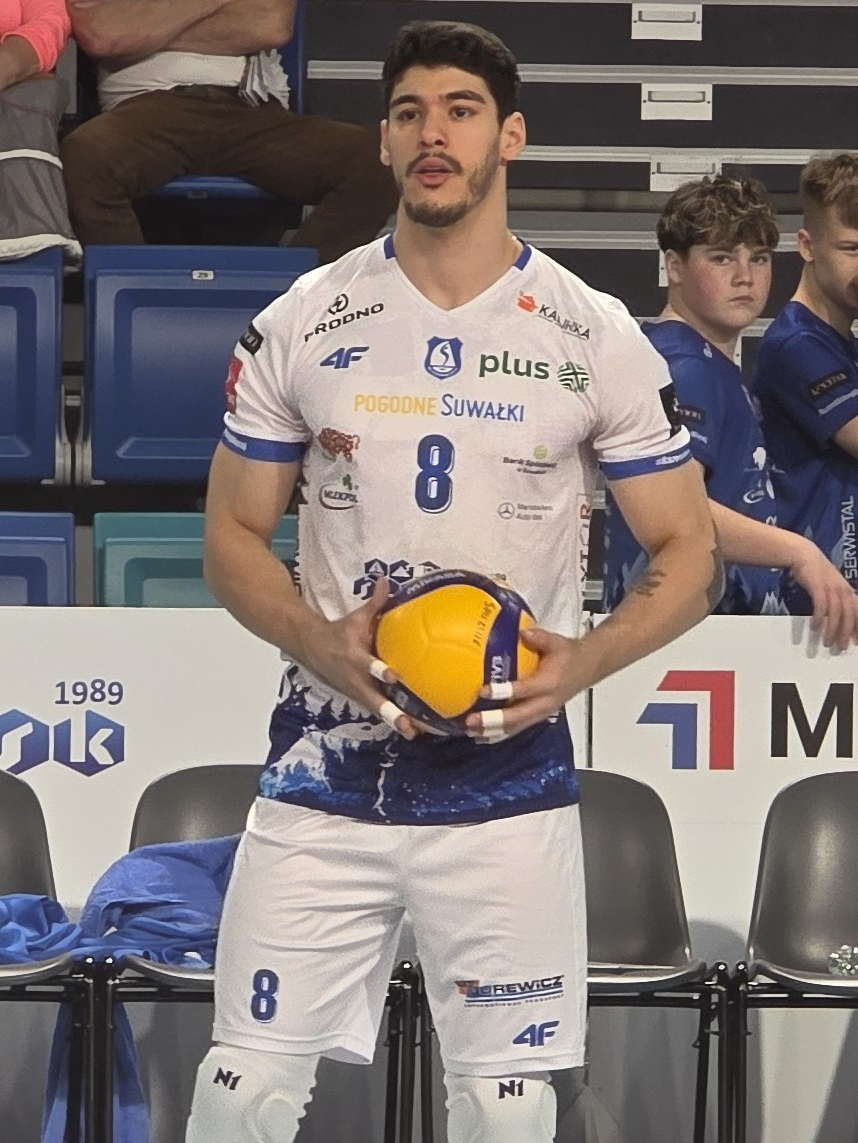
- Henrique Honorato in 2025

Personal information
- Full name: Henrique Dantas Nóbrega Honorato
- Nickname: Honoratinho
- Born: 18 March 1997 (age 29); Campina Grande, Paraíba, Brazil
- Height: 1.90 m (6 ft 3 in)
- Weight: 85 kg (187 lb)
- Spike: 335 cm (132 in)
- Block: 310 cm (122 in)

Volleyball information
- Position: Outside spiker, Libero
- Current club: Minas Tênis Clube
- Number: 7

Career
Years	Teams
2017–	Minas Tênis Clube

National team
2019–	Brazil
Honours
Men's volleyball
Representing Brazil
FIVB Nations League
Bronze medal – third place	2025 Ningbo
Pan American Games
Gold medal – first place	2023 Santiago	Team
Bronze medal – third place	2019 Lima	Team
South American Championship
Silver medal – second place	2023 Recife
- Last updated: 5 November 2023

Henrique Dantas Nóbrega Honorato (Note: This name uses Portuguese naming customs: the first or maternal family name is Nóbrega and the second or paternal family name is Honorato.) (born 18 March 1997) is a Brazilian indoor volleyball player. He is a current member of the Brazil men's national volleyball team.

== Career ==
He participated at the 2017 FIVB Volleyball Men's U21 World Championship and 2019 FIVB Volleyball Men's Nations League.

== Sporting achievements ==
=== National team ===
- 2018 Pan-American Cup
- 2019 Pan American Games
- 2023 Pan American Games

=== Individuals ===
- 2017 U21 Pan-American Cup – Best outside spiker
