= Bartosz Bednorz =

Polish volleyball player (born 1994)

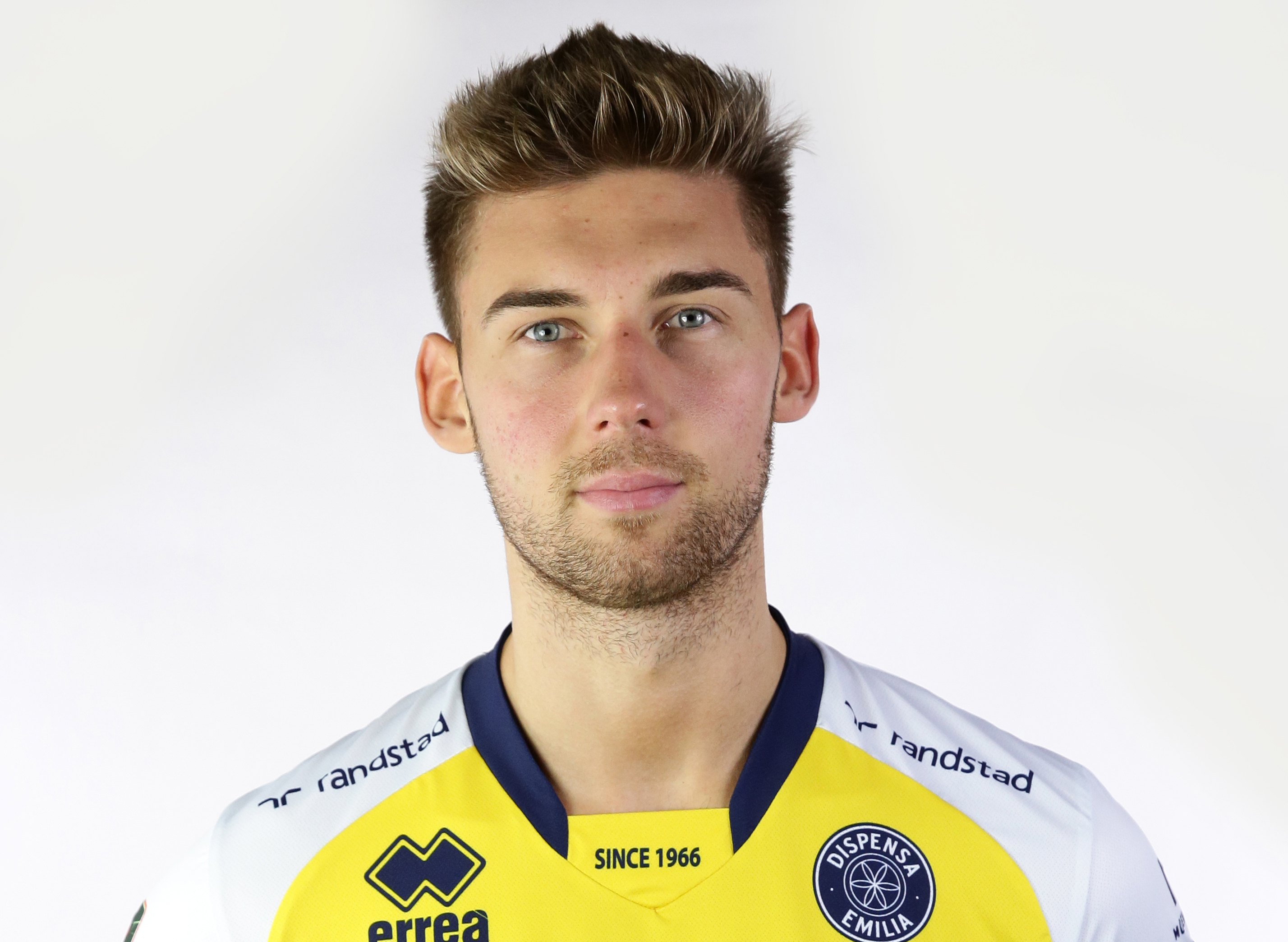
- Bednorz as Modena Volley player

Personal information
- Born: 25 July 1994 (age 32); Zabrze, Poland
- Height: 2.01 m (6 ft 7 in)
- Weight: 93 kg (205 lb)
- Spike: 360 cm (142 in)
- Block: 330 cm (130 in)

Volleyball information
- Position: Outside hitter
- Current club: Projekt Warsaw
- Number: 10

Career
Years	Teams
2013–2014; 2014–2016; 2016–2018; 2018–2020; 2020–2022; 2022–2023; 2023–2024; 2024–2025; 2025–	AZS Częstochowa; AZS Olsztyn; Skra Bełchatów; Modena Volley; Zenit Kazan; Shanghai Bright; ZAKSA Kędzierzyn-Koźle; Asseco Resovia; Projekt Warsaw

National team
2015–	Poland
Honours
Men's volleyball
Representing Poland
FIVB Nations League
Gold medal – first place	2023 Gdańsk
Gold medal – first place	2025 Ningbo
Silver medal – second place	2021 Rimini
Bronze medal – third place	2019 Chicago
Bronze medal – third place	2022 Bologna
Bronze medal – third place	2024 Łódź
CEV European Championship
Gold medal – first place	2023 Italy/Bulgaria/North Macedonia/Israel
European League
Bronze medal – third place	2015 Poland

Bartosz Bednorz (born 25 July 1994) is a Polish professional volleyball player who plays as an outside hitter for Projekt Warsaw and the Poland national team.

== Career ==
=== Club ===
In 2014, Bednorz signed a contract with Indykpol AZS Olsztyn, and the next year, he extended his contract for a one more season. In April 2016, PGE Skra Bełchatów, announced that Bednorz is going to play for Skra in the next PlusLiga season. He signed a two–year contract until 2018.

=== National team ===
On 2 April 2015, he was called up to the Poland national team by the head coach Stéphane Antiga. He was a member of the national team during the intercontinental round of the 2015 World League. On 14 August 2015, he achieved his first medal as a national team player – bronze of the European League. His national team won the 3rd place match with Estonia (3–0).

== Honours ==
=== Club ===
- CEV Champions League
  - 2022–23 – with ZAKSA Kędzierzyn-Koźle
- CEV Cup
  - 2024–25 – with Asseco Resovia
- Domestic
  - 2017–18 Polish SuperCup, with PGE Skra Bełchatów
  - 2017–18 Polish Championship, with PGE Skra Bełchatów
  - 2018–19 Italian SuperCup, with Azimut Modena
  - 2020–21 Russian SuperCup, with Zenit Kazan
  - 2021–22 Russian Cup, with Zenit Kazan
  - 2022–23 Polish Cup, with ZAKSA Kędzierzyn-Koźle
  - 2023–24 Polish SuperCup, with ZAKSA Kędzierzyn-Koźle

=== Individual awards ===
- 2017: Polish SuperCup – Most valuable player
- 2019: FIVB Nations League – Best outside spiker
- 2023: Polish SuperCup – Most valuable player
