= Vuk Todorović =

Serbian volleyball player (born 1993)

Personal information
- Born: 23 April 1998 (age 28) Belgrade, Serbia, FR Yugoslavia
- Height: 1.91 m (6 ft 3 in)
- Weight: 83 kg (183 lb)

Volleyball information
- Position: Setter
- Current club: Pallavolo Padova

Career
- Years: Team
- 2017–2021 2021–2023 2023–2024 2024–2025 2025–: OK Vojvodina; ACH Volley; Czarni Radom; Stilon Gorzów; Pallavolo Padova

National team
- Years: Team
- –: Serbia
Honours
Men's volleyball
Representing Serbia
CEV European Championship
Gold medal – first place	2019 Belgium/France/Netherlands/Slovenia

Vuk Todorović (Serbian Cyrillic: Вук Тодоровић; born 23 April 1998) is a Serbian professional volleyball player who plays as a setter for Sonepar Padova and the Serbia national team.

He competed for Serbia at the 2024 Summer Olympics.

== Honours ==
=== Club ===
- Domestic
  - 2017–18 Serbian Championship, with Vojvodina Novi Sad
  - 2018–19 Serbian Championship, with Vojvodina Novi Sad
  - 2019–20 Serbian SuperCup, with Vojvodina Novi Sad
  - 2019–20 Serbian Cup, with Vojvodina Novi Sad
  - 2019–20 Serbian Championship, with Vojvodina Novi Sad
  - 2020–21 Serbian SuperCup, with Vojvodina Novi Sad
  - 2020–21 Serbian Championship, with Vojvodina Novi Sad
  - 2021–22 Slovenian Cup, with ACH Volley
  - 2021–22 Slovenian Championship, with ACH Volley
  - 2022–23 Slovenian Cup, with ACH Volley
  - 2022–23 Slovenian Championship, with ACH Volley
