= Jan Firlej (volleyball) =

Polish volleyball player (born 1996)

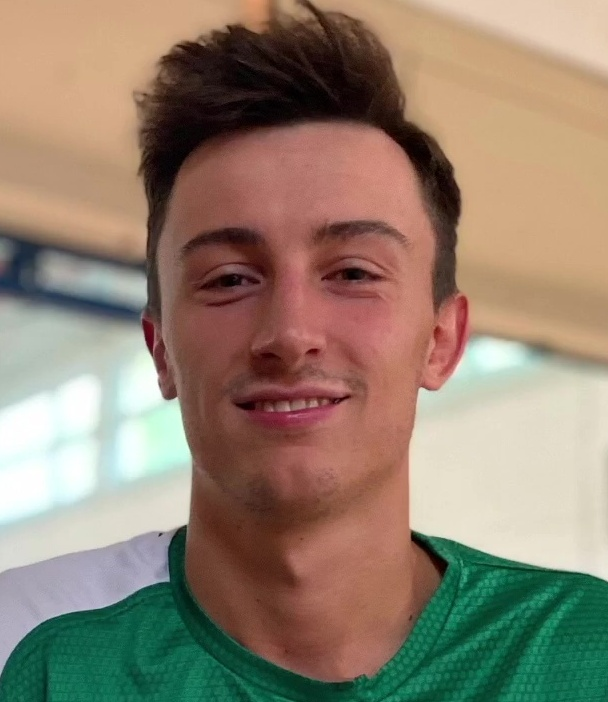

Personal information
- Born: 26 September 1996 (age 30); Radom, Poland
- Height: 1.88 m (6 ft 2 in)
- Weight: 84 kg (185 lb)
- Spike: 330 cm (130 in)

Volleyball information
- Position: Setter
- Current club: Projekt Warsaw
- Number: 5

Career
Years	Teams
2013–2015; 2015–2018; 2018–2019; 2019–2021; 2021–2022; 2022–	Czarni Radom; AZS Politechnika Warszawska; Lindemans Aalst; GKS Katowice; AZS Olsztyn; Projekt Warsaw

National team
2022–	Poland
Honours
Men's volleyball
Representing Poland
FIVB World Championship
Bronze medal – third place	2025 Philippines
FIVB Nations League
Gold medal – first place	2025 Ningbo
Gold medal – first place	2026 Ningbo
CEV European Championship
Gold medal – first place	2026 Bulgaria/Finland/Italy/Romania

Jan Firlej (born 26 September 1996) is a Polish professional volleyball player who plays as a setter for Projekt Warsaw and the Poland national team.

== Honours ==
=== Club ===
- CEV Challenge Cup
  - 2023–24 – with Projekt Warsaw
