= Moritz Karlitzek =

German volleyball player (born 1996)

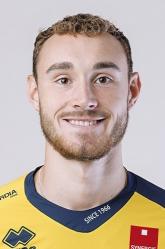
- Karlitzek in 2020

Personal information
- Nickname: Kalli
- Born: 12 August 1996 (age 30); Hammelburg, Germany
- Height: 1.91 m (6 ft 3 in)
- Weight: 85 kg (187 lb)
- Spike: 350 cm (138 in)
- Block: 325 cm (128 in)

Volleyball information
- Position: Outside hitter
- Current club: AZS Olsztyn
- Number: 2

Career
Years	Teams
2015–2017; 2017–2019; 2019–2020; 2020–2021; 2021–2022; 2022–	TV Rottenburg; United Volleys Rhein-Main; Top Volley Cisterna; Leo Shoes Modena; Arago de Sète; AZS Olsztyn

National team
Germany
Honours
Men's volleyball
Representing Germany
CEV European Championship
Silver medal – second place	2017 Poland

Moritz Karlitzek (born 12 August 1996) is a German professional volleyball player who plays as an outside hitter for Indykpol AZS Olsztyn and the Germany national team.
