= Lukas Maase =

German volleyball player (born 1998)

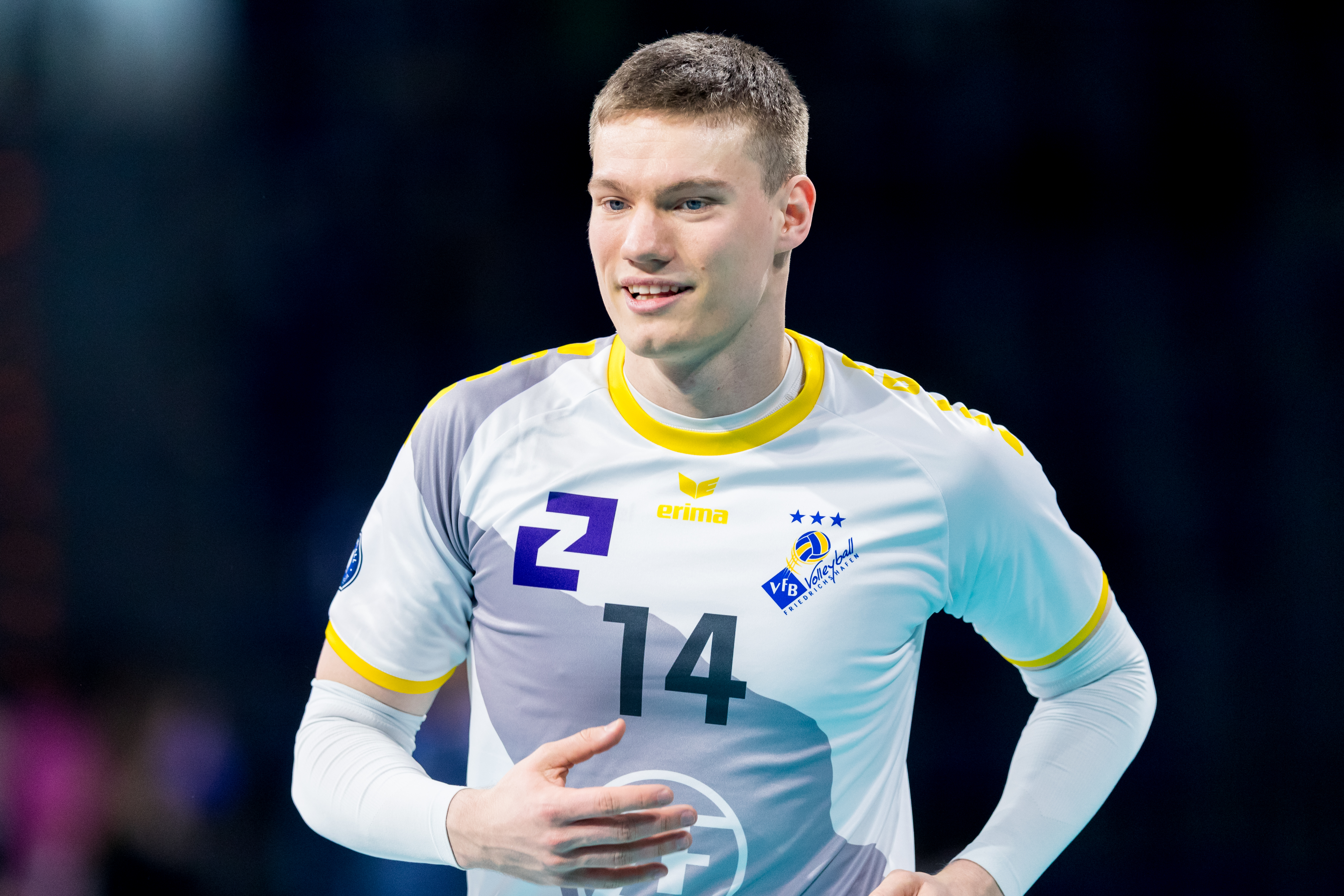
- Maase in 2022

Personal information
- Nationality: German
- Born: 28 August 1998 (age 28)
- Height: 208 cm (6 ft 10 in)

Lukas Maase (born 28 August 1998) is a German volleyball player. He represented Germany at the 2024 Summer Olympics.
