= Nik Mujanović =

Slovenian volleyball player (born 2004)

Personal information
- Nickname: Mujo
- Nationality: Slovenian
- Born: 14 October 2004 (age 22)
- Hometown: Kamnik
- Height: 206 cm (6 ft 9 in)
Honours
Men's volleyball
Representing Slovenia
Nations League
Bronze medal – third place	2026 Ningbo	Team

Nik Mujanović (born 14 October 2004) is a Slovenian volleyball player. He represented Slovenia at the 2024 Summer Olympics.
