= Sašo Štalekar =

Slovenian volleyball player (born 1996)

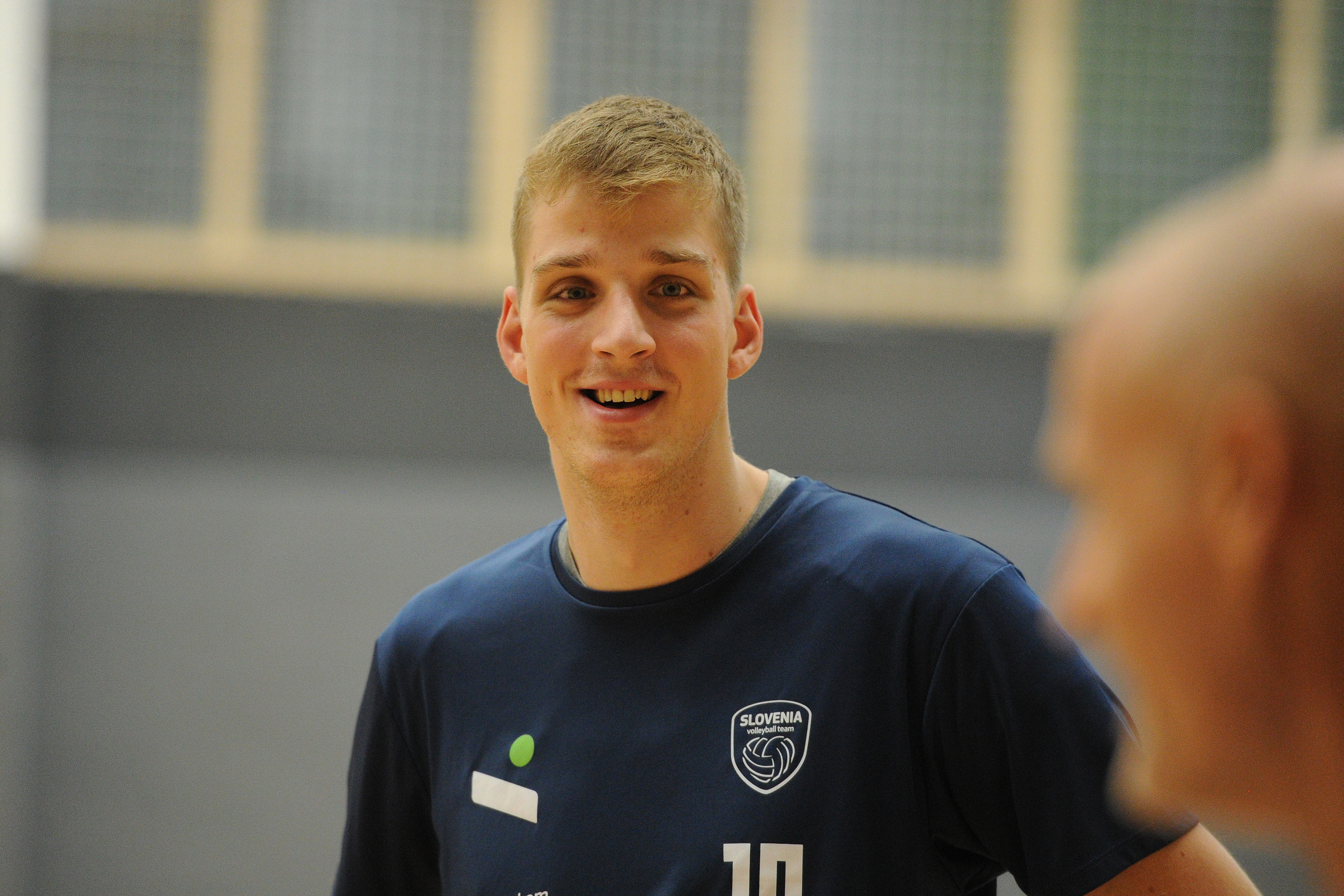
- Štalekar in 2022

Personal information
- Nationality: Slovenian
- Born: 3 May 1996 (age 30); Slovenj Gradec, Slovenia
- Height: 2.14 m (7 ft 0 in)
- Weight: 99 kg (218 lb)
- Spike: 354 cm (139 in)
- Block: 338 cm (133 in)

Volleyball information
- Position: Middle blocker
- Current club: ACH Volley

Career
Years	Teams
2015–2019	Calcit Kamnik
2019–2020	Hypo Tirol AlpenVolleys Haching
2020–2021	Calcit Kamnik
2021–2022	Panathinaikos
2022–2024	Berlin Recycling Volleys
2024–	ACH Volley

National team
2015–	Slovenia
Honours
Men's volleyball
Representing Slovenia
FIVB Nations League
Bronze medal – third place	2026 China
European Championship
Silver medal – second place	2019 France/Slovenia/Belgium/Netherlands
Silver medal – second place	2021 Poland/Czech Republic/Estonia/Finland
Bronze medal – third place	2023 Italy/Bulgaria/North Macedonia/Israel

Sašo Štalekar (born 3 May 1996) is a Slovenian male volleyball player who plays as a middle blocker for ACH Volley and the Slovenia national team.

He represented Slovenia at the 2024 Summer Olympics.

== Honours ==
Slovenia

- 2019 (silver) Men's European Volleyball Championship
- 2021 (silver) Men's European Volleyball Championship
- 2023 (bronze) Men's European Volleyball Championship
- 2026 (bronze) Men's Volleyball Nations League
