= Johannes Tille =

German volleyball player (born 1997)

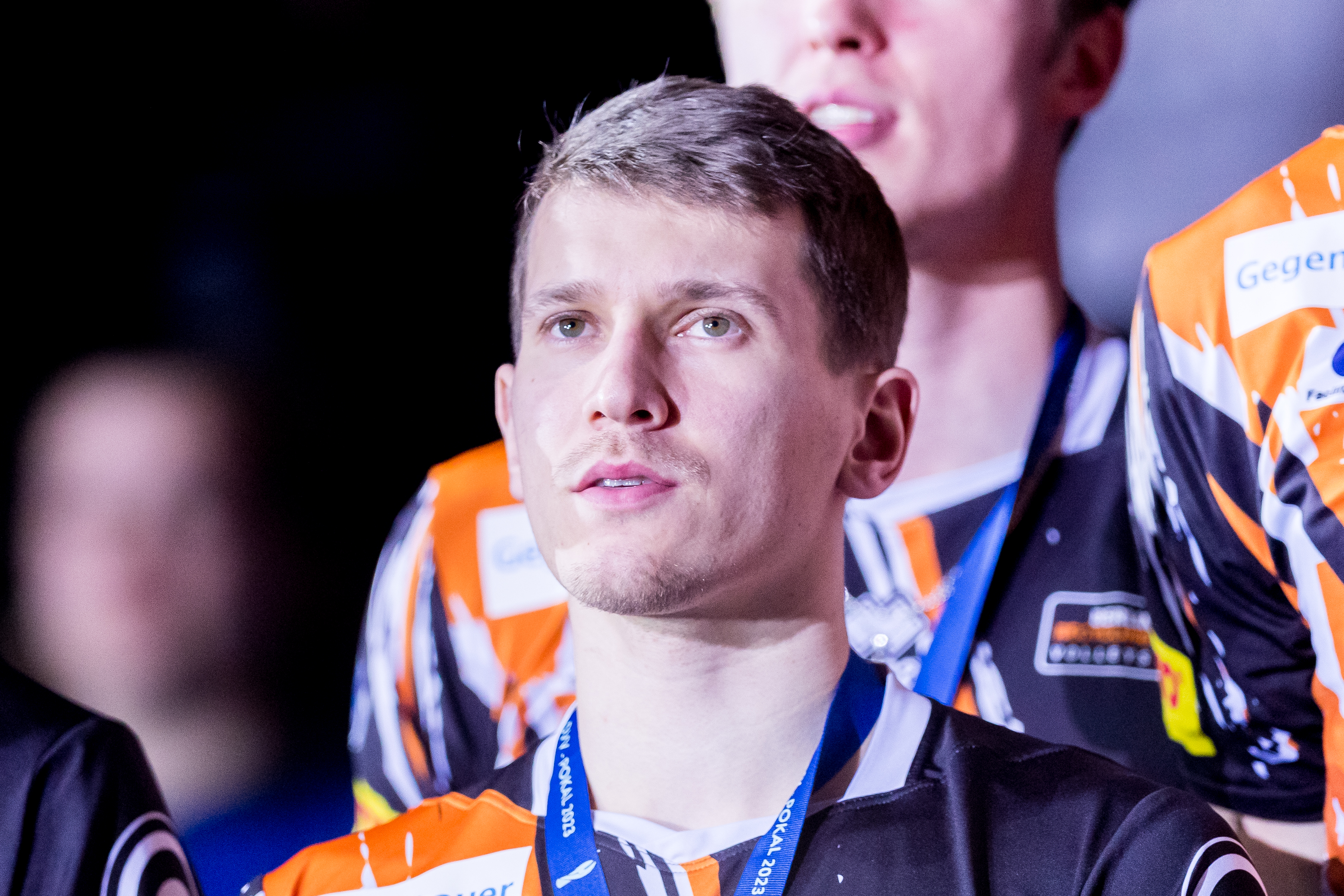
- Tille in 2023

Personal information
- Born: 7 May 1997 (age 29); Mühldorf am Inn, Germany
- Height: 1.85 m (6 ft 1 in)
- Weight: 87 kg (192 lb)

Volleyball information
- Position: Setter
- Current club: AZS Olsztyn
- Number: 6

Career
Years	Teams
2017–2018; 2018–2021; 2021–2022; 2022–2025; 2025–	Bergische Volleys; Volleys Herrsching; Saint-Nazaire VBA; Berlin Recycling Volleys; AZS Olsztyn

National team
Germany

Johannes Tille (born 7 May 1997) is a German professional volleyball player who plays as a setter for Indykpol AZS Olsztyn and the Germany national team. He represented Germany at the 2024 Summer Olympics.

== Honours ==
=== Club ===
- Domestic
  - 2022–23 German SuperCup, with Berlin Recycling Volleys
  - 2022–23 German Cup, with Berlin Recycling Volleys
  - 2022–23 German Championship, with Berlin Recycling Volleys
  - 2023–24 German SuperCup, with Berlin Recycling Volleys
  - 2023–24 German Cup, with Berlin Recycling Volleys
  - 2023–24 German Championship, with Berlin Recycling Volleys
  - 2024–25 German SuperCup, with Berlin Recycling Volleys
  - 2024–25 German Cup, with Berlin Recycling Volleys
  - 2024–25 German Championship, with Berlin Recycling Volleys
