= Tobias Brand =

German volleyball player (born 1998)

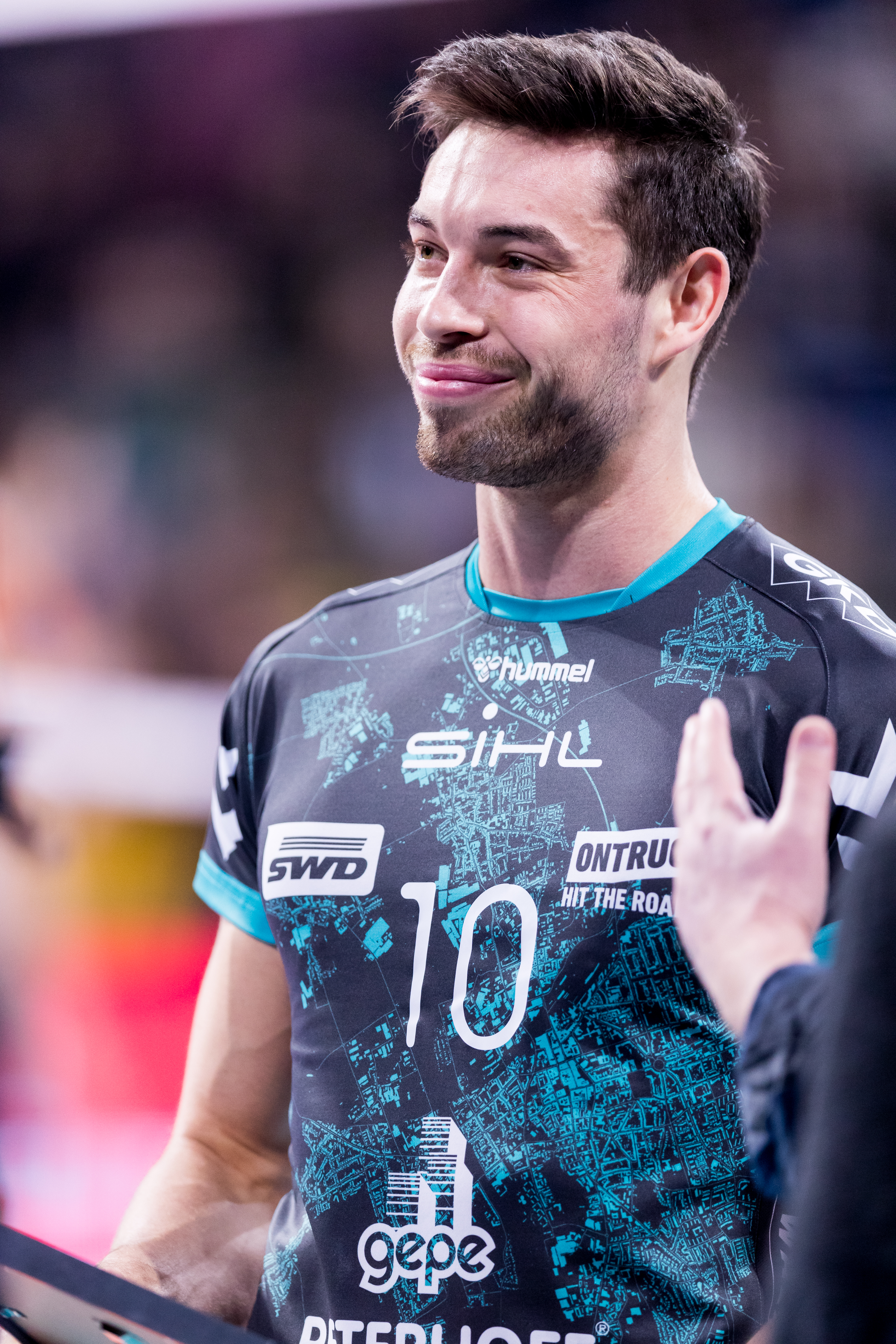
- Brand in 2023

Personal information
- Full name: Tobias Christian Brand
- Born: 9 July 1998 (age 28) Mainz, Germany
- Height: 1.95 m (6 ft 5 in)

Volleyball information
- Position: Outside hitter
- Current club: Asseco Resovia
- Number: 10

Career
- Years: Team
- 2019–2023 2023–2024 2024–2025 2025–2026 2026–: SWD Powervolleys Düren; LUK Lublin; Projekt Warsaw; Trefl Gdańsk; Asseco Resovia

National team
- Years: Team
- –: Germany

Tobias Christian Brand (born 9 July 1998) is a German professional volleyball player who plays as an outside hitter for Asseco Resovia and the Germany national team. He represented his country at the 2024 Summer Olympics.
