= 2026 Men's European Volleyball Championship final round =

The final round of the 2026 Men's European Volleyball Championship will take place from 19 to 26 September 2026.

== Qualified teams ==
The top four from each group advanced to the knockout stage.

Group	Winners	Runners-up	Third place	Fourth place
A	Italy (H)	Slovenia	Greece	Czechia
B	Poland	Ukraine	Bulgaria (H)	Portugal
C	Belgium	Finland (H)	Serbia	Denmark
D	France	Germany	Romania (H)	Latvia

== Bracket ==
Round of 16
20 September – Turin
Italy	3
Denmark	0
20 September – Turin
Finland	3
Greece	2
20 September – Sofia
France	3
Portugal	0
20 September – Sofia
Ukraine	0
Romania	3
21 September – Turin
Belgium	3
Czechia	1
21 September – Turin
Slovenia	3
Serbia	0
19 September – Sofia
Poland	3
Latvia	0
19 September – Sofia
Germany	3
Bulgaria	2

Quarterfinals
23 September – Turin
Italy	2
Finland	3
22 September – Sofia
France	3
Romania	0
23 September – Turin
Belgium	1
Slovenia	3
22 September – Sofia
Poland	3
Germany	0

Semifinals
25 September – Milan
Finland	1
France	3
25 September – Milan
Slovenia	0
Poland	3

Final
26 September – Milan
France	1
Poland	3
3rd place match
26 September – Milan
Finland	3
Slovenia	0

== Round of 16 ==
19 September 2026; 16:00; Match duration: 1 hr 11 min	Poland	3–0	Latvia	(Bulgaria) Arena 8888, Sofia; Attendance: 1,376; Referees: Dominga Lot (ITA), Alexandros Mylonakis (GRE)
19 September 2026; 16:00; Match duration: 1 hr 11 min	(25–17, 25–16, 25–16); Report			(Bulgaria) Arena 8888, Sofia; Attendance: 1,376; Referees: Dominga Lot (ITA), Alexandros Mylonakis (GRE)
19 September 2026; 16:00; Match duration: 1 hr 11 min	Scoring leaders			(Bulgaria) Arena 8888, Sofia; Attendance: 1,376; Referees: Dominga Lot (ITA), Alexandros Mylonakis (GRE)
Fornal 19		Total	Landzāns 11
Fornal (13/19)		Attack	Landzāns (10/27)
Fornal 6		Block	Freimanis 3
Jakubiszak (2/15)		Serve	Landzāns (1/8)

19 September 2026; 19:00; Match duration: 2 hr 17 min	Germany	3–2	Bulgaria	(Bulgaria) Arena 8888, Sofia; Attendance: 12,198; Referees: Vlastimil Kovar (CZE), Dejan Rogić (SER)
19 September 2026; 19:00; Match duration: 2 hr 17 min	(21–25, 21–25, 25–19, 25–23, 15–12); Report			(Bulgaria) Arena 8888, Sofia; Attendance: 12,198; Referees: Vlastimil Kovar (CZE), Dejan Rogić (SER)
19 September 2026; 19:00; Match duration: 2 hr 17 min	Scoring leaders			(Bulgaria) Arena 8888, Sofia; Attendance: 12,198; Referees: Vlastimil Kovar (CZE), Dejan Rogić (SER)
Röhrs 20		Total	A. Nikolov 23
Röhrs (14/29)		Attack	A. Nikolov (17/42)
Röhrs 3		Block	Grozdanov 4
Brehme, Peter, Röhrs 3		Serve	A. Nikolov (5/24)

20 September 2026; 16:00; Match duration: 1 hr 36 min	Ukraine	0–3	Romania	(Bulgaria) Arena 8888, Sofia; Attendance: 544; Referees: Dejan Rogić (SRB), Dominga Lot (ITA)
20 September 2026; 16:00; Match duration: 1 hr 36 min	(22–25, 21–25, 28–30); Report			(Bulgaria) Arena 8888, Sofia; Attendance: 544; Referees: Dejan Rogić (SRB), Dominga Lot (ITA)
20 September 2026; 16:00; Match duration: 1 hr 36 min	Scoring leaders			(Bulgaria) Arena 8888, Sofia; Attendance: 544; Referees: Dejan Rogić (SRB), Dominga Lot (ITA)
Plotnytskyi 15		Total	Rață 16
Plotnytskyi (12/25)		Attack	Rață (16/29)
Plotnytskyi, Yevstratov 2		Block	Bartha 2
Yanchuk (2/18)		Serve	Chiţigoi (6/16)

20 September 2026; 16:00; Match duration: 2 hr 26 min	Finland	3–2	Greece	(Italy) Palavela, Turin; Attendance: 2,861; Referees: Seçkin Yener (TUR), Paul Catalin Szabo-Alexi (ROU)
20 September 2026; 16:00; Match duration: 2 hr 26 min	(22–25, 25–16, 22–25, 25–23, 15–13); Report			(Italy) Palavela, Turin; Attendance: 2,861; Referees: Seçkin Yener (TUR), Paul Catalin Szabo-Alexi (ROU)
20 September 2026; 16:00; Match duration: 2 hr 26 min	Scoring leaders			(Italy) Palavela, Turin; Attendance: 2,861; Referees: Seçkin Yener (TUR), Paul Catalin Szabo-Alexi (ROU)
L. Marttila, N. Marttila 21		Total	Markou 20
L. Marttila (19/37)		Attack	Markou (17/31)
Jokela 6		Block	Protopsaltis 2
N. Marttila (3/19)		Serve	Markou (3/20)

20 September 2026; 19:00; Match duration: 1 hr 17 min	France	3–0	Portugal	(Bulgaria) Arena 8888, Sofia; Attendance: 644; Referees: Juraj Mokry (SVK), Vlastimil Kovar (CZE)
20 September 2026; 19:00; Match duration: 1 hr 17 min	(25–21, 25–22, 25–21); Report			(Bulgaria) Arena 8888, Sofia; Attendance: 644; Referees: Juraj Mokry (SVK), Vlastimil Kovar (CZE)
20 September 2026; 19:00; Match duration: 1 hr 17 min	Scoring leaders			(Bulgaria) Arena 8888, Sofia; Attendance: 644; Referees: Juraj Mokry (SVK), Vlastimil Kovar (CZE)
Clévenot, Henno 12		Total	Ferreira, Garcia Martins 13
Henno (12/23)		Attack	Garcia Martins (13/22)
Brizard, Huetz 1		Block	Figueiredo, Cveticanin 2
Clévenot, Duflos-Rossi 1		Serve	Ferreira, Semedo Tavares 1

20 September 2026; 21:05; Match duration: 1 hr 30 min	Italy	3–0	Denmark	(Italy) Palavela, Turin; Attendance: 7,580; Referees: Koen Luts (BEL), Ksenija Jurkovic (CRO)
20 September 2026; 21:05; Match duration: 1 hr 30 min	(25–22, 25–16, 25–11); Report			(Italy) Palavela, Turin; Attendance: 7,580; Referees: Koen Luts (BEL), Ksenija Jurkovic (CRO)
20 September 2026; 21:05; Match duration: 1 hr 30 min	Scoring leaders			(Italy) Palavela, Turin; Attendance: 7,580; Referees: Koen Luts (BEL), Ksenija Jurkovic (CRO)
Romanò 14		Total	Jensen 14
Romanò (11/18)		Attack	Madsen (13/19)
Mati 6		Block	Uhrenholt 1
Romanò (2/13)		Serve	Jensen (3/12)

21 September 2026; 16:00; Match duration: 1 hr 44 min	Belgium	3–1	Czechia	(Italy) Palavela, Turin; Attendance: 1,021; Referees: Paul Catalin Szabo-Alexi (ROU), Atanas Varbanov (BUL)
21 September 2026; 16:00; Match duration: 1 hr 44 min	(20–25, 26–24, 25–14, 25–15); Report			(Italy) Palavela, Turin; Attendance: 1,021; Referees: Paul Catalin Szabo-Alexi (ROU), Atanas Varbanov (BUL)
21 September 2026; 16:00; Match duration: 1 hr 44 min	Scoring leaders			(Italy) Palavela, Turin; Attendance: 1,021; Referees: Paul Catalin Szabo-Alexi (ROU), Atanas Varbanov (BUL)
Reggers 24		Total	Indra, Vašina 14
Reggers (18/34)		Attack	Indra, Vašina 13
Fafchamps , Reggers 4		Block	6 players 1
Fafchamps, Reggers 2		Serve	Klajmon (1/13)

21 September 2026; 21:00; Match duration: 1 hr 17 min	Slovenia	3-0	Serbia	(Italy) Palavela, Turin; Attendance: 1,153; Referees: Ksenija Jurkovic (CRO), Koen Luts (BEL)
21 September 2026; 21:00; Match duration: 1 hr 17 min	(25–14, 25–13, 25–22); Report			(Italy) Palavela, Turin; Attendance: 1,153; Referees: Ksenija Jurkovic (CRO), Koen Luts (BEL)
21 September 2026; 21:00; Match duration: 1 hr 17 min	Scoring leaders			(Italy) Palavela, Turin; Attendance: 1,153; Referees: Ksenija Jurkovic (CRO), Koen Luts (BEL)
Mujanović 14		Total	Ivović 8
Mujanović (11/21)		Attack	Ivović (8/18)
Kozamernik 5		Block	Nedeljković 3
Mujanović (3/12)		Serve	Jovović (1/3)

== Quarterfinals ==
22 September 2026; 16:00; Match duration: 1 hr 14 min	France	3-0	Romania	(Bulgaria) Arena 8888, Sofia; Attendance: 2,844; Referees: Vlastimil Kovar (CZE), Dejan Rogić (SRB)
22 September 2026; 16:00; Match duration: 1 hr 14 min	(25–16, 25–19, 25–19); Report			(Bulgaria) Arena 8888, Sofia; Attendance: 2,844; Referees: Vlastimil Kovar (CZE), Dejan Rogić (SRB)
22 September 2026; 16:00; Match duration: 1 hr 14 min	Scoring leaders			(Bulgaria) Arena 8888, Sofia; Attendance: 2,844; Referees: Vlastimil Kovar (CZE), Dejan Rogić (SRB)
Faure 19		Total	Chiţigoi 11
Faure (18/24)		Attack	Chiţigoi (10/16)
Huetz 6		Block	3 players 1
Magnin (3/12)		Serve	none

22 September 2026; 19:00; Match duration: 1 hr 16 min	Poland	3-0	Germany	(Bulgaria) Arena 8888, Sofia; Attendance: 7,174; Referees: Alexandros Mylonakis (GRE), Juraj Mokry (SVK)
22 September 2026; 19:00; Match duration: 1 hr 16 min	(25–23, 25–17, 25–17); Report			(Bulgaria) Arena 8888, Sofia; Attendance: 7,174; Referees: Alexandros Mylonakis (GRE), Juraj Mokry (SVK)
22 September 2026; 19:00; Match duration: 1 hr 16 min	Scoring leaders			(Bulgaria) Arena 8888, Sofia; Attendance: 7,174; Referees: Alexandros Mylonakis (GRE), Juraj Mokry (SVK)
León 17		Total	Röhrs 12
León (17/22)		Attack	Brand (11/25)
Jakubiszak 2		Block	Krick 2
Lemański (1/11)		Serve	Röhrs (2/11)

23 September 2026; 16:00; Match duration: 1 hr 54 min	Belgium	1-3	Slovenia	(Italy) Palavela, Turin; Attendance: 2,447; Referees: Ksenija Jurkovic (CRO), Seçkin Yener (TUR)
23 September 2026; 16:00; Match duration: 1 hr 54 min	(22–25, 22–25, 25–20, 13–25); Report			(Italy) Palavela, Turin; Attendance: 2,447; Referees: Ksenija Jurkovic (CRO), Seçkin Yener (TUR)
23 September 2026; 16:00; Match duration: 1 hr 54 min	Scoring leaders			(Italy) Palavela, Turin; Attendance: 2,447; Referees: Ksenija Jurkovic (CRO), Seçkin Yener (TUR)
Reggers 23		Total	Možič 18
Reggers (22/45)		Attack	Možič (15/24)
Colson 2		Block	Kozamernik 5
D'Hulst (1/13)		Serve	Pajenk (2/21)

23 September 2026; 21:05; Match duration: 2 hr 15 min	Italy	2–3	Finland	(Italy) Palavela, Turin; Attendance: 8,260; Referees: Atanas Varbanov (BUL), Koen Luts (BEL)
23 September 2026; 21:05; Match duration: 2 hr 15 min	(25–21, 26–28, 16–25, 25–20, 13–15); Report			(Italy) Palavela, Turin; Attendance: 8,260; Referees: Atanas Varbanov (BUL), Koen Luts (BEL)
23 September 2026; 21:05; Match duration: 2 hr 15 min	Scoring leaders			(Italy) Palavela, Turin; Attendance: 8,260; Referees: Atanas Varbanov (BUL), Koen Luts (BEL)
Romanò 20		Total	Jokela 28
Romanò (17/27)		Attack	Jokela (27/40)
Sanguinetti 4		Block	Haapaniemi 5
Romanò (3/19)		Serve	L. Marttila (3/21)

== Semifinals ==
25 September 2026; 17:00; Match duration: 1 hr 32 min	Slovenia	0–3	Poland	(Italy) Unipol Forum, Milan; Attendance: 7,054; Referees: Dominga Lot (ITA), Paul Catalin Szabo-Alexi (ROU)
25 September 2026; 17:00; Match duration: 1 hr 32 min	(23–25, 23–25, 18–25); Report			(Italy) Unipol Forum, Milan; Attendance: 7,054; Referees: Dominga Lot (ITA), Paul Catalin Szabo-Alexi (ROU)
25 September 2026; 17:00; Match duration: 1 hr 32 min	Scoring leaders			(Italy) Unipol Forum, Milan; Attendance: 7,054; Referees: Dominga Lot (ITA), Paul Catalin Szabo-Alexi (ROU)
Mujanović 20		Total	Bołądź 14
Mujanović (14/34)		Attack	Bołądź (13/28)
Kozamernik 3		Block	Lemański 4
Mujanović (4/14)		Serve	León (2/11)

25 September 2026; 21:00; Match duration: 1 hr 35 min	Finland	1–3	France	(Italy) Unipol Forum, Milan; Attendance: 5,845; Referees: Alexandros Mylonakis (GRE), Juraj Mokry (SVK)
25 September 2026; 21:00; Match duration: 1 hr 35 min	(17–25, 25–18, 18–25, 15–25); Report			(Italy) Unipol Forum, Milan; Attendance: 5,845; Referees: Alexandros Mylonakis (GRE), Juraj Mokry (SVK)
25 September 2026; 21:00; Match duration: 1 hr 35 min	Scoring leaders			(Italy) Unipol Forum, Milan; Attendance: 5,845; Referees: Alexandros Mylonakis (GRE), Juraj Mokry (SVK)
N. Marttila 13		Total	Henno 21
N. Marttila (12/22)		Attack	Henno (19/27)
Jokela, Tyynismaa 2		Block	Magnin 3
Tyynismaa (1/9)		Serve	Faure (2/17)

== 3rd place match ==
26 September 2026; 17:00; Match duration: 1 hr 38 min	Finland	3-0	Slovenia	(Italy) Unipol Forum, Milan; Attendance: 5,881; Referees: Paul Catalin Szabo-Alexi (ROU), Ksenija Jurkovic (CRO)
26 September 2026; 17:00; Match duration: 1 hr 38 min	(25–23, 25–20, 29–27); Report			(Italy) Unipol Forum, Milan; Attendance: 5,881; Referees: Paul Catalin Szabo-Alexi (ROU), Ksenija Jurkovic (CRO)
26 September 2026; 17:00; Match duration: 1 hr 38 min	Scoring leaders			(Italy) Unipol Forum, Milan; Attendance: 5,881; Referees: Paul Catalin Szabo-Alexi (ROU), Ksenija Jurkovic (CRO)
N. Marttila 19		Total	Možič 15
N. Marttila (15/28)		Attack	Možič (15/24)
N. Marttila 4		Block	Kozamernik 3
4 players 1		Serve	Bračko, Pajenk 1

== Final ==
26 September 2026; 21:00; Match duration: 1 hr 55 min	France	1–3	Poland	(Italy) Unipol Forum, Milan; Attendance: 11,118; Referees: Juraj Mokry (SVK), Dominga Lot (ITA)
26 September 2026; 21:00; Match duration: 1 hr 55 min	(29–31, 19–25, 25–20, 16–25); Report			(Italy) Unipol Forum, Milan; Attendance: 11,118; Referees: Juraj Mokry (SVK), Dominga Lot (ITA)
26 September 2026; 21:00; Match duration: 1 hr 55 min	Scoring leaders			(Italy) Unipol Forum, Milan; Attendance: 11,118; Referees: Juraj Mokry (SVK), Dominga Lot (ITA)
Henno 20		Total	Bołądź 16
Henno (18/32)		Attack	Bołądź (15/28)
Gueye 5		Block	Lemański 3
Faure (2/14)		Serve	León (4/17)
