= 2026 Men's European Volleyball Championship Pool B =

Pool B was one of four pools of the preliminary round of the 2026 Men's European Volleyball Championship. The pool consists of the co-hosts Bulgaria, Israel, North Macedonia, Poland, Portugal and Ukraine. The matches were played at Arena 8888 in Sofia from 9 to 16 September 2026. The top four teams advanced to the final round. The top four teams progressing from Pool B were Poland, Ukraine and co-hosts Bulgaria, whom all had 4 wins, while Portugal scrapped a fourth place finish after Israel lost to North Macedonia on the final day.

== Teams ==
Team	Qualification method	Date of qualification	Appearance(s)				Previous best performance (Note: Bold text indicates they hosted that edition.)	WR (Note: World ranking at start of tournament.)
Team	Qualification method	Date of qualification	Total	First	Last	Streak	Previous best performance	WR
Ukraine	Top eight in 2023	9 September 2023	9th	1993	2023	4	Sixth place (1993)	TBD
Poland	Top eight in 2023	10 September 2023	29th	1950	2023	13	Champions (2009, 2023)	TBD
Bulgaria	Host nation	26 February 2024	32nd	1950	2023	10	Runners-up (1951)	TBD
Portugal	Tenth in 2023	24 March 2024	8th	1948	2023	4	Fourth place (1948)	TBD
Israel	Five best runner-ups	16 August 2025	4th	1951	2023	2	Tenth place (1951)	TBD
North Macedonia	Five best runner-ups	17 August 2025	4th	2019	2023	4	Sixteenth place (2023)	TBD

== Venue ==
The nation's biggest indoor facility, Arena 8888, would be chosen, replacing the originally chosen Palace of Culture and Sports in Varna. The established venue has hosted various competitions, with this being their third major volleyball tournament after the 2015 Men's European Volleyball Championship and 2018 FIVB Men's Volleyball World Championship. The venue has also hosted Junior Eurovision Song Contest 2015.

2026 Men's European Volleyball Championship Pool B is located in Bulgaria	Sofia
2026 Men's European Volleyball Championship Pool B is located in Bulgaria	Arena 8888
2026 Men's European Volleyball Championship Pool B is located in Bulgaria	Capacity: 15,373

== Group standings ==
Pos	Team	Pld	W	L	Pts	SW	SL	SR	SPW	SPL	SPR	Qualification
1	Poland	5	4	1	13	14	3	4.667	420	319	1.317	Round of 16
2	Ukraine	5	4	1	12	12	5	2.400	398	360	1.106	Round of 16
3	Bulgaria (H)	5	4	1	11	13	6	2.167	454	408	1.113	Round of 16
4	Portugal	5	1	4	4	5	12	0.417	335	382	0.877	Round of 16
5	North Macedonia	5	1	4	3	3	12	0.250	284	366	0.776	
6	Israel	5	1	4	2	5	14	0.357	388	444	0.874	

Source: CEV
(H) Host

=== Group progression ===
The table listed the results of teams in each round.

Win	Loss

Team ╲ Round	1	2	3	4	5
Bulgaria	W	W	L	W	W
North Macedonia	L	L	L	L	W
Poland	W	W	W	W	L
Ukraine	W	W	W	W	L
Portugal	L	L	L	L	W
Israel	L	L	W	L	L

Source: CEV

=== Positions by round ===
The table listed the positions of teams in each round.

Advance to the knockout stage

Team ╲ Round	1	2	3	4	5
Bulgaria	2	2	3	3	3
North Macedonia	5	5	6	6	5
Poland	1	1	1	1	1
Ukraine	3	3	2	2	2
Portugal	6	6	5	5	4
Israel	4	4	4	4	6

Source: CEV

== Matches ==
- All times are Eastern European Summer Time (UTC+03:00).

=== Bulgaria vs North Macedonia ===
9 September 2026; 19:00; Match duration: 1hr 19min	Bulgaria	3–0	North Macedonia	(Bulgaria) Arena 8888, Sofia; Attendance: 8,892; Referees: Dominga Lot (ITA), Caner Cildir (TUR)
9 September 2026; 19:00; Match duration: 1hr 19min	(25–17, 25–19, 25–17); Report			(Bulgaria) Arena 8888, Sofia; Attendance: 8,892; Referees: Dominga Lot (ITA), Caner Cildir (TUR)
9 September 2026; 19:00; Match duration: 1hr 19min	Scoring leaders			(Bulgaria) Arena 8888, Sofia; Attendance: 8,892; Referees: Dominga Lot (ITA), Caner Cildir (TUR)
A. Nikolov 19		Total	Gjorgiev 8
A. Nikolov (16/24)		Attack	Gjorgiev (8/19)
Bardarov, Petkov 2		Block	'Four players' 1
S. Nikolov (7/20)		Serve	0

=== Poland vs Portugal ===
10 September 2026; 16:00; Match duration: 1hr 09min	Poland	3–0	Portugal	(Bulgaria) Arena 8888, Sofia; Attendance: 867; Referees: Yves Kälin (SWI), Dejan Rogić (SER)
10 September 2026; 16:00; Match duration: 1hr 09min	(25–12, 25–18, 25–20); Report			(Bulgaria) Arena 8888, Sofia; Attendance: 867; Referees: Yves Kälin (SWI), Dejan Rogić (SER)
10 September 2026; 16:00; Match duration: 1hr 09min	Scoring leaders			(Bulgaria) Arena 8888, Sofia; Attendance: 867; Referees: Yves Kälin (SWI), Dejan Rogić (SER)
Bołądź 9		Total	Martins 13
Bołądź (7/12)		Attack	Martins (12/18)
Lemański 3		Block	'Five players' 1
'Four players' 1		Serve	0

=== Israel vs Ukraine ===
10 September 2026; 19:00; Match duration: 2hr 02min	Israel	1–3	Ukraine	(Bulgaria) Arena 8888, Sofia; Attendance: 289; Referees: Caner Cildir (TUR), Juraj Mokry (SVK)
10 September 2026; 19:00; Match duration: 2hr 02min	(22–25, 19–25, 25–22, 19–25); Report			(Bulgaria) Arena 8888, Sofia; Attendance: 289; Referees: Caner Cildir (TUR), Juraj Mokry (SVK)
10 September 2026; 19:00; Match duration: 2hr 02min	Scoring leaders			(Bulgaria) Arena 8888, Sofia; Attendance: 289; Referees: Caner Cildir (TUR), Juraj Mokry (SVK)
Liberman 23		Total	Yanchuk 18
Liberman (21/40)		Attack	Yanchuk (15/29)
Batchkala 2		Block	Semeniuk 6
Liberman, Rura 2		Serve	Kisiliuk, Yanchuk 2

=== Ukraine vs North Macedonia ===
11 September 2026; 16:00; Match duration: 1hr 19min	Ukraine	3–0	North Macedonia	(Bulgaria) Arena 8888, Sofia; Attendance: 453; Referees: Dejan Rogić (SER), Dominga Lot (ITA)
11 September 2026; 16:00; Match duration: 1hr 19min	(25–22, 25–22, 25–10); Report			(Bulgaria) Arena 8888, Sofia; Attendance: 453; Referees: Dejan Rogić (SER), Dominga Lot (ITA)
11 September 2026; 16:00; Match duration: 1hr 19min	Scoring leaders			(Bulgaria) Arena 8888, Sofia; Attendance: 453; Referees: Dejan Rogić (SER), Dominga Lot (ITA)
Plotnytskyi 16		Total	Gjorgiev, Savovski 8
Kisiliuk (14/19)		Attack	Gjorgiev (8/19)
Tupchii 3		Block	Savovski 4
Plotnytskyi (7/16)		Serve	Ljaftov, Madjunkov 1

=== Portugal vs Bulgaria ===
11 September 2026; 19:00; Match duration: 1hr 18min	Portugal	0–3	Bulgaria	(Bulgaria) Arena 8888, Sofia; Attendance: 10,678; Referees: Juraj Mokry (SVK), Yves Kalin (SWI)
11 September 2026; 19:00; Match duration: 1hr 18min	(18–25, 18–25, 20–25); Report			(Bulgaria) Arena 8888, Sofia; Attendance: 10,678; Referees: Juraj Mokry (SVK), Yves Kalin (SWI)
11 September 2026; 19:00; Match duration: 1hr 18min	Scoring leaders			(Bulgaria) Arena 8888, Sofia; Attendance: 10,678; Referees: Juraj Mokry (SVK), Yves Kalin (SWI)
Pereira 13		Total	A. Nikolov 17
Pereira (12/28)		Attack	A. Nikolov (14/19)
'Three players' 1		Block	Grozdanov 4
Martins (2/15)		Serve	Atanasov, A. Nikolov 2

=== Poland vs Israel ===
12 September 2026; 16:00; Match duration: 1 hr 12 min	Poland	3–0	Israel	(Bulgaria) Arena 8888, Sofia; Attendance: 1,876; Referees: Dominga Lot (POL), Dejan Rogić (SRB)
12 September 2026; 16:00; Match duration: 1 hr 12 min	(25–16, 25–17, 25–18); Report			(Bulgaria) Arena 8888, Sofia; Attendance: 1,876; Referees: Dominga Lot (POL), Dejan Rogić (SRB)
12 September 2026; 16:00; Match duration: 1 hr 12 min	Scoring leaders			(Bulgaria) Arena 8888, Sofia; Attendance: 1,876; Referees: Dominga Lot (POL), Dejan Rogić (SRB)
Fornal 10		Total	Liberman 14
Fornal, Semeniuk 7		Attack	Liberman (14/32)
Sasak 2		Block	Goldrin 2
Fornal (2/7)		Serve	Maron (1/7)

=== Bulgaria vs Ukraine ===
12 September 2026; 19:00; Match duration: 2hr 09min	Bulgaria	1−3	Ukraine	(Bulgaria) Arena 8888, Sofia; Attendance: 11,689; Referees: Caner Cildir (TUR), Juraj Mokry (SVK)
12 September 2026; 19:00; Match duration: 2hr 09min	(23−25, 22−25, 25−21, 21−25); Report			(Bulgaria) Arena 8888, Sofia; Attendance: 11,689; Referees: Caner Cildir (TUR), Juraj Mokry (SVK)
12 September 2026; 19:00; Match duration: 2hr 09min	Scoring leaders			(Bulgaria) Arena 8888, Sofia; Attendance: 11,689; Referees: Caner Cildir (TUR), Juraj Mokry (SVK)
Asparuhov, S. Nikolov 9		Total	Plotnytskyi 23
Asparuhov (9/12)		Attack	Plotnytskyi (16/30)
Grozdanov, S. Nikolov 3		Block	Tupchii 2
A. Nikolov, S. Nikolov 2		Serve	Plotnytskyi (7/24)

=== Portugal vs Israel ===
13 September 2026; 16:00; Match duration: 2hr 00min	Portugal	2–3	Israel	(Bulgaria) Arena 8888, Sofia; Attendance: 288; Referees: Yves Kälin (SWI), Dominga Lot (POL)
13 September 2026; 16:00; Match duration: 2hr 00min	(25–19, 20–25, 25–20, 22–25, 7–15); Report			(Bulgaria) Arena 8888, Sofia; Attendance: 288; Referees: Yves Kälin (SWI), Dominga Lot (POL)
13 September 2026; 16:00; Match duration: 2hr 00min	Scoring leaders			(Bulgaria) Arena 8888, Sofia; Attendance: 288; Referees: Yves Kälin (SWI), Dominga Lot (POL)
Ferreira 20		Total	Rura 23
Ferreira (18/36)		Attack	Rura (20/38)
Cveticanin 4		Block	'Five players' 1
Tavares (2/18)		Serve	Rura (2/14)

=== North Macedonia vs Poland ===
13 September 2026; 19:00; Match duration: 1hr 07min	North Macedonia	0–3	Poland	(Bulgaria) Arena 8888, Sofia; Attendance: 876; Referees: Dejan Rogić (SER), Caner Cildir (TUR)
13 September 2026; 19:00; Match duration: 1hr 07min	(19–25, 16–25, 13–25); Report			(Bulgaria) Arena 8888, Sofia; Attendance: 876; Referees: Dejan Rogić (SER), Caner Cildir (TUR)
13 September 2026; 19:00; Match duration: 1hr 07min	Scoring leaders			(Bulgaria) Arena 8888, Sofia; Attendance: 876; Referees: Dejan Rogić (SER), Caner Cildir (TUR)
Ljaftov 6		Total	Bołądź 13
Ljaftov (6/14)		Attack	Bołądź (10/15)
Savovski 2		Block	Nowak, Szalpuk 3
0		Serve	'Four players' 1

=== Ukraine vs Portugal ===
14 September 2026; 16:00; Match duration: 1hr 14min	Ukraine	3−0	Portugal	(Bulgaria) Arena 8888, Sofia; Attendance: 257; Referees: Juraj Mokry (SVK), Caner Cildir (TUR)
14 September 2026; 16:00; Match duration: 1hr 14min	(25−18, 25−18, 25−19); Report			(Bulgaria) Arena 8888, Sofia; Attendance: 257; Referees: Juraj Mokry (SVK), Caner Cildir (TUR)
14 September 2026; 16:00; Match duration: 1hr 14min	Scoring leaders			(Bulgaria) Arena 8888, Sofia; Attendance: 257; Referees: Juraj Mokry (SVK), Caner Cildir (TUR)
Plotnytskyi 19		Total	Figueiredo, Martins 8
Plotnytskyi (16/25)		Attack	Martins (8/15)
'Five players' 1		Block	Pereira, Tavares 2
Yanchuk (3/15)		Serve	Dias (2/14)

=== Bulgaria vs Israel ===
14 September 2026; 19:00; Match duration: 1hr 49min	Bulgaria	3−1	Israel	(Bulgaria) Arena 8888, Sofia; Attendance: 9,865; Referees: Dominga Lot (ITA), Yves Kälin (SWI)
14 September 2026; 19:00; Match duration: 1hr 49min	(23−25, 25−22, 25−15, 25−20); Report			(Bulgaria) Arena 8888, Sofia; Attendance: 9,865; Referees: Dominga Lot (ITA), Yves Kälin (SWI)
14 September 2026; 19:00; Match duration: 1hr 49min	Scoring leaders			(Bulgaria) Arena 8888, Sofia; Attendance: 9,865; Referees: Dominga Lot (ITA), Yves Kälin (SWI)
Bardarov, A. Nikolov 18		Total	Rura 18
Bardarov (16/26)		Attack	Rura (17/30)
Asparuhov 4		Block	Maron 2
Asparuhov (3/13)		Serve	Liberman (3/18)

=== North Macedonia vs Portugal ===
15 September 2026; 16:00; Match duration: 1hr 15min	North Macedonia	0−3	Portugal	(Bulgaria) Arena 8888, Sofia; Attendance: 59; Referees: Caner Cildir (TUR), Dejan Rogić (SER)
15 September 2026; 16:00; Match duration: 1hr 15min	(13−25, 20−25, 20−25); Report			(Bulgaria) Arena 8888, Sofia; Attendance: 59; Referees: Caner Cildir (TUR), Dejan Rogić (SER)
15 September 2026; 16:00; Match duration: 1hr 15min	Scoring leaders			(Bulgaria) Arena 8888, Sofia; Attendance: 59; Referees: Caner Cildir (TUR), Dejan Rogić (SER)
Ljaftov, Iliev 8		Total	Ferreira 17
Ljaftov, Iliev 8		Attack	Ferreira (16/28)
Savovski 3		Block	Semedo Tavares, Cveticanin 4
0		Serve	'Three players' 1

=== Poland vs Ukraine ===
15 September 2026; 19:00; Match duration: 1hr 15min	Poland	3−0	Ukraine	(Bulgaria) Arena 8888, Sofia; Attendance: 1,314; Referees: Yves Kälin (SWI), Juraj Mokry (SVK)
15 September 2026; 19:00; Match duration: 1hr 15min	(25−20, 25−13, 25−22); Report			(Bulgaria) Arena 8888, Sofia; Attendance: 1,314; Referees: Yves Kälin (SWI), Juraj Mokry (SVK)
15 September 2026; 19:00; Match duration: 1hr 15min	Scoring leaders			(Bulgaria) Arena 8888, Sofia; Attendance: 1,314; Referees: Yves Kälin (SWI), Juraj Mokry (SVK)
Bołądź 20		Total	Tupchii 8
Bołądź (19/26)		Attack	Tupchii (7/16)
Jakubiszak, Fornal 2		Block	Shchurov 2
Leon (3/18)		Serve	Plotnytskyi (2/12)

=== Israel vs North Macedonia ===
16 September 2026; 16:00; Match duration: 1hr 27min	Israel	0−3	North Macedonia	(Bulgaria) Arena 8888, Sofia; Attendance: 657; Referees: Dejan Rogić (SER), Yves Kälin (SUI)
16 September 2026; 16:00; Match duration: 1hr 27min	(21−25, 23−25, 22−25); Report			(Bulgaria) Arena 8888, Sofia; Attendance: 657; Referees: Dejan Rogić (SER), Yves Kälin (SUI)
16 September 2026; 16:00; Match duration: 1hr 27min	Scoring leaders			(Bulgaria) Arena 8888, Sofia; Attendance: 657; Referees: Dejan Rogić (SER), Yves Kälin (SUI)
Liberman 21		Total	Gjorgiev 20
Liberman (21/34)		Attack	Gjorgiev (19/30)
Maron 4		Block	Savovski 2
0		Serve	Savovski (2/14)

=== Poland vs Bulgaria ===
16 September 2026; 19:00; Match duration: 2hr 24min	Poland	2–3	Bulgaria	(Bulgaria) Arena 8888, Sofia; Attendance: 13,186; Referees: Juraj Mokry (SVK), Dominga Lot (ITA)
16 September 2026; 19:00; Match duration: 2hr 24min	(25–20, 29–31, 23–25, 25–19, 18–20); Report			(Bulgaria) Arena 8888, Sofia; Attendance: 13,186; Referees: Juraj Mokry (SVK), Dominga Lot (ITA)
16 September 2026; 19:00; Match duration: 2hr 24min	Scoring leaders			(Bulgaria) Arena 8888, Sofia; Attendance: 13,186; Referees: Juraj Mokry (SVK), Dominga Lot (ITA)
Semeniuk 22		Total	A. Nikolov 36
Semeniuk 20		Attack	A. Nikolov 34
Lemański 5		Block	Grozdanov 5
Lemański, Jakubiszak 2		Serve	S. Nikolov 3
