= 2018 FIVB Men's Volleyball Challenger Cup qualification =

The 2018 FIVB Men's Volleyball Challenger Cup qualification was a series of tournaments held to decide which teams would play in the 2018 FIVB Men's Volleyball Challenger Cup. The 2018 Challenger Cup featured 6 teams. Only one place was allocated to the hosts. The remaining 5 places were determined by a qualification process, in which entrants from among the other teams from the five FIVB confederations competed.

== Qualification summary ==
Country	Confederation	Qualified as	Qualified on	Previous appearances			Previous best performance
Country	Confederation	Qualified as	Qualified on	Total	First	Last	Previous best performance
Kazakhstan^{1}	AVC	Asian Qualifier winners	20 May 2018	0	None		None
Chile^{1}	CSV	South American Qualifier winners	20 May 2018	0	None		None
Portugal	CEV	Host country	6 June 2018	0	None		None
Cuba	NORCECA	North American Qualifier winners	9 June 2018	0	None		None
Estonia	CEV	2018 European Golden League champions	13 June 2018	0	None		None
Czech Republic	CEV	2018 European Golden League runners-up	13 June 2018	0	None		None

1.Originally, the CAVB would have a direct spot in the Challenger Cup, while the representatives from AVC and CSV would play a playoff for a spot. However, FIVB fined the CAVB for not hosting any kind of qualifier event and the winners of the AVC and CSV qualifier booked a direct qualification.

== Means of qualification ==
Qualified for the 2018 Challenger Cup
Already qualified as hosts for the 2018 Challenger Cup

== Continental qualification tournaments ==
=== AVC (Asia and Oceania) ===
- Venue: Baluan Sholak Sports Palace, Almaty, Kazakhstan
- Dates: 18–20 May 2018
- The winners qualified for the 2018 Challenger Cup.

Rank	Team
1	Kazakhstan
2	Pakistan
3	Chinese Taipei

=== CAVB (Africa) ===
CAVB was deprived of the right to participate in the 2018 Challenger Cup because it did not hosting any kind of qualifier event. So the AVC–CSV playoff was canceled and the winners of the AVC and CSV qualifier directly qualified for the 2018 Challenger Cup.

=== CEV (Europe) ===
- Final venue: KV Arena, Karlovy Vary, Czech Republic
- Dates: 19 May – 14 June 2018
- The top two teams that had not yet qualified for the 2018 Challenger Cup qualified for the 2018 Challenger Cup.

Rank	Team
1st place, gold medalist(s)	Estonia
2nd place, silver medalist(s)	Czech Republic
3rd place, bronze medalist(s)	Turkey
4	Portugal
5	Netherlands
6	Belgium
7	Finland
8	Ukraine
9	Spain
10	Sweden
11	Slovakia
12	Slovenia

=== CSV (South America) ===
- Venue: Centro Nacional de Entrenamiento Olímpico, Santiago, Chile
- Dates: 18–20 May 2018
- The winners qualified for the 2018 Challenger Cup.

Rank	Team
1	Chile
2	Peru
3	Paraguay
4	Bolivia

=== NORCECA (North America) ===
- Venue: Sala 19 de noviembre, Pinar del Río, Cuba
- Dates: 5–9 June 2018
- The winners qualified for the 2018 Challenger Cup.

Rank	Team
1	Cuba
2	Puerto Rico
3	Guatemala
4	Trinidad and Tobago
5	Costa Rica
