= 2018 FIVB Men's Volleyball Challenger Cup =

International volleyball tournament

Challenger Cup de Masculino Portugal 2018

Tournament details
- Host country: Portugal
- City: Matosinhos
- Dates: 20–24 June
- Teams: 6 (from 4 confederations)
- Venue: 1 (in 1 host city)

Final positions
- Champions: Portugal (1st title)
- Runners-up: Czech Republic
- Third place: Estonia
- Fourth place: Cuba

Tournament statistics
- Matches played: 10
- Attendance: 11,952 (1,195 per match)
- Best scorer: (Cuba) Miguel Gutiérrez (67 points)
- Best spiker: (Portugal) Alexandre Ferreira (58.89%)
- Best blocker: (Kazakhstan) Nodirkhan Kadirkhanov (1.14 Avg)
- Best server: (Portugal) Alexandre Ferreira (0.62 Avg)
- Best setter: (Chile) Matias Banda (26.57 Avg)
- Best digger: (Chile) Dusan Bonacic (2.00 Avg)
- Best receiver: (Chile) Vicente Parraguirre (32.73%)

The 2018 FIVB Men's Volleyball Challenger Cup was the inaugural edition of the FIVB Men's Volleyball Challenger Cup, a new annual men's international volleyball tournament contested by six national teams that acts as a qualifier for the FIVB Men's Volleyball Nations League. The tournament was held in Matosinhos, Portugal from 20 to 24 June 2018.

Portugal won the title, defeating Czech Republic in the final, and earned the right to participate in the 2019 Nations League replacing South Korea, the last placed challenger team after the 2018 edition. Estonia defeated Cuba in the 3rd place match.

== Qualification ==
A total of 6 teams qualified for the tournament.

Country	Confederation	Qualified as	Qualified on	Previous appearances			Previous best performance
Country	Confederation	Qualified as	Qualified on	Total	First	Last	Previous best performance
Kazakhstan^{1}	AVC	Asian Qualifier winners	20 May 2018	0	None		None
Chile^{1}	CSV	South American Qualifier winners	20 May 2018	0	None		None
Portugal	CEV	Host country	6 June 2018	0	None		None
Cuba	NORCECA	North American Qualifier winners	9 June 2018	0	None		None
Estonia	CEV	2018 European Golden League champions	13 June 2018	0	None		None
Czech Republic	CEV	2018 European Golden League runners-up	13 June 2018	0	None		None

1.Originally, the CAVB would have a direct spot in the Challenger Cup, while the representatives from AVC and CSV would play a playoff for a spot. However, FIVB fined the CAVB for not hosting any kind of qualifier event and the winners of the AVC and CSV qualifier booked a direct qualification.

== Pools composition ==
Teams were seeded following the serpentine system according to their FIVB World Ranking as of 7 July 2017. FIVB reserved the right to seed the hosts as head of pool A regardless of the World Ranking. Rankings are shown in brackets except the hosts who ranked 30th.

Pool A	Pool B
Portugal (Hosts)	Cuba (16)
Estonia (32)	Czech Republic (27)
Kazakhstan (35)	Chile (41)

== Venue ==
- Centro de Desportos e Congressos de Matosinhos, Matosinhos, Portugal

== Pool standing procedure ==
1. Number of matches won
2. Match points
3. Sets ratio
4. Points ratio
5. Result of the last match between the tied teams

Match won 3–0 or 3–1: 3 match points for the winner, 0 match points for the loser
Match won 3–2: 2 match points for the winner, 1 match point for the loser

== Preliminary round ==
- All times are Western European Summer Time (UTC+01:00).

=== Pool A ===
Pos	Team	Pld	W	L	Pts	SW	SL	SR	SPW	SPL	SPR	Qualification
1	Portugal	2	2	0	6	6	0	MAX	150	113	1.327	Semifinals
2	Estonia	2	1	1	3	3	4	0.750	149	161	0.925	Semifinals
3	Kazakhstan	2	0	2	0	1	6	0.167	144	169	0.852	

Date	Time		Score		Set 1	Set 2	Set 3	Set 4	Set 5	Total	Report
20 Jun	21:00	Portugal	3–0	Estonia	25–19	25–16	25–20			75–55	P2 Report
21 Jun	18:00	Estonia	3–1	Kazakhstan	25–22	19–25	25–19	25–20		94–86	P2 Report
22 Jun	21:00	Kazakhstan	0–3	Portugal	23–25	19–25	16–25			58–75	P2 Report

=== Pool B ===
Pos	Team	Pld	W	L	Pts	SW	SL	SR	SPW	SPL	SPR	Qualification
1	Czech Republic	2	2	0	6	6	0	MAX	150	112	1.339	Semifinals
2	Cuba	2	1	1	3	3	4	0.750	179	183	0.978	Semifinals
3	Chile	2	0	2	0	1	6	0.167	158	192	0.823	

Date	Time		Score		Set 1	Set 2	Set 3	Set 4	Set 5	Total	Report
20 Jun	18:00	Cuba	0–3	Czech Republic	19–25	22–25	21–25			62–75	P2 Report
21 Jun	21:00	Czech Republic	3–0	Chile	25–15	25–17	25–18			75–50	P2 Report
22 Jun	18:00	Chile	1–3	Cuba	36–38	22–25	31–29	19–25		108–117	P2 Report

== Final round ==
- All times are Western European Summer Time (UTC+01:00).

Semifinals
23 June – Matosinhos
Czech Republic	3
Estonia	1
23 June – Matosinhos
Portugal	3
Cuba	0

Final
24 June – Matosinhos
Czech Republic	1
Portugal	3
3rd place match
24 June – Matosinhos
Estonia	3
Cuba	0

=== Semifinals ===
Date	Time		Score		Set 1	Set 2	Set 3	Set 4	Set 5	Total	Report
23 Jun	15:00	Czech Republic	3–1	Estonia	29–31	27–25	25–18	25–21		106–95	P2 Report
23 Jun	18:00	Portugal	3–0	Cuba	25–22	25–21	26–24			76–67	P2 Report

=== 3rd place match ===
Date	Time		Score		Set 1	Set 2	Set 3	Set 4	Set 5	Total	Report
24 Jun	15:00	Estonia	3–0	Cuba	30–28	25–21	25–16			80–65	Report

=== Final ===
Date	Time		Score		Set 1	Set 2	Set 3	Set 4	Set 5	Total	Report
24 Jun	18:00	Czech Republic	1–3	Portugal	25–18	22–25	19–25	16–25		82–93	Report

== Final standing ==
Rank	Team
1st place, gold medalist(s)	Portugal
2nd place, silver medalist(s)	Czech Republic
3rd place, bronze medalist(s)	Estonia
4	Cuba
5	Chile
5	Kazakhstan

Qualified for the 2019 Nations League

Source: VCC 2018 final standing

2018 Men's Challenger Cup champions

Portugal
1st title

13–man Roster
Caique da Silva, José Belo, Filip Cveticanin, Marco Ferreira, Alexandre Ferreira (c), Januário Silva, José Monteiro, João Simões, Phelipe Martins, Lourenço Martins, Valdir Sequeira, Miguel Tavares Rodrigues, João Fidalgo
Head coach
Hugo Silva

== See also ==
- 2018 FIVB Men's Volleyball Nations League
- 2018 FIVB Women's Volleyball Challenger Cup
