= Orlęta Radzyń Podlaski =

Polish football club

- Full name: LKS Orlęta-Spomlek Radzyń Podlaski
- Founded: 1924; 102 years ago
- Ground: Stadion Miejski
- Capacity: 1,620
- Chairman: Krzysztof Grochowski
- Manager: Robert Chmura
- League: IV liga Lublin
- 2023–24: III liga, group IV, 17th of 18 (relegated)
- Website: orleta-spomlek.pl
Home colours	Away colours

Ludowy Klub Sportowy Orlęta Radzyń Podlaski is a Polish football club based in Radzyń Podlaski. The club was established in 1924. They play in the IV liga Lublin, after suffering relegation from the 2023–24 III liga. The club is also known as LKS Orlęta-Spomlek Radzyń Podlaski due to sponsorship of local dairy company Spomlek.

== Players ==
As of 6 August 2023

Note: Flags indicate national team as defined under FIFA eligibility rules; some limited exceptions apply. Players may hold more than one non-FIFA nationality.

No.	Pos.	Nation	Player
—	DF	UKR	Ihor Krashnevskyi
—	FW	UKR	Denys Ostrovskyi

No.	Pos.	Nation	Player
—	FW	UKR	Dmytro Yanchuk
