= Alexandre Ferreira =

Alexandre Ferreira may refer to:

- Alexandre Ferreira (fighter), Brazilian mixed martial artist
- Alexandre Rodrigues Ferreira (1756–1815), Portuguese naturalist
- Alexandre Ferreira (volleyball) (born 1991), Portuguese volleyball player
