= 2018 FIVB Men's Volleyball Challenger Cup qualification (NORCECA) =

The North American section of the 2018 FIVB Men's Volleyball Challenger Cup qualification acted as a qualifier for the 2018 FIVB Men's Volleyball Challenger Cup, for national teams which are members of the North, Central America and Caribbean Volleyball Confederation (NORCECA). The tournament was held in Pinar del Río, Cuba from 5 to 9 June 2018. The winners Cuba qualified for the 2018 Challenger Cup.

== Qualification ==
6 NORCECA national teams entered qualification. But, Mexico later withdrew.

- Cuba (Hosts)
- Costa Rica
- Guatemala
- ~~Mexico~~
- Puerto Rico
- Trinidad and Tobago

== Venue ==
- Sala 19 de noviembre, Pinar del Río, Cuba

== Pool standing procedure ==
1. Number of matches won
2. Match points
3. Sets ratio
4. Points ratio
5. Result of the last match between the tied teams

Match won 3–0: 5 match points for the winner, 0 match points for the loser
Match won 3–1: 4 match points for the winner, 1 match point for the loser
Match won 3–2: 3 match points for the winner, 2 match points for the loser

== Round robin ==
- All times are Cuba Daylight Time (UTC−04:00).

Pos	Team	Pld	W	L	Pts	SPW	SPL	SPR	SW	SL	SR
1	Cuba	4	4	0	20	300	192	1.563	12	0	MAX
2	Puerto Rico	4	3	1	15	287	217	1.323	9	3	3.000
3	Guatemala	4	2	2	8	286	316	0.905	6	8	0.750
4	Trinidad and Tobago	4	1	3	6	271	313	0.866	4	9	0.444
5	Costa Rica	4	0	4	1	219	325	0.674	1	12	0.083

Date	Time		Score		Set 1	Set 2	Set 3	Set 4	Set 5	Total	Report
5 Jun	15:30	Puerto Rico	3–0	Trinidad and Tobago	25–15	25–14	27–25			77–54	P2 P3
5 Jun	18:30	Cuba	3–0	Guatemala	25–10	25–16	25–10			75–36	P2 P3
6 Jun	15:30	Trinidad and Tobago	3–0	Costa Rica	25–12	27–25	26–24			78–61	P2 P3
6 Jun	18:30	Guatemala	0–3	Puerto Rico	11–25	15–25	21–25			47–75	P2 P3
7 Jun	15:30	Costa Rica	0–3	Puerto Rico	17–25	12–25	12–25			41–75	P2 P3
7 Jun	18:30	Cuba	3–0	Trinidad and Tobago	25–21	25–13	25–11			75–45	P2 P3
8 Jun	15:30	Guatemala	3–1	Costa Rica	22–25	25–15	25–15	25–17		97–72	P2 P3
8 Jun	18:30	Cuba	3–0	Puerto Rico	25–18	25–22	25–20			75–60	P2 P3
9 Jun	15:30	Trinidad and Tobago	1–3	Guatemala	25–20	28–30	21–25	20–25		94–100	P2 P3
9 Jun	18:30	Cuba	3–0	Costa Rica	25–13	25–16	25–16			75–45	P2 P3

== Final standing ==
Rank	Team
1	Cuba
2	Puerto Rico
3	Guatemala
4	Trinidad and Tobago
5	Costa Rica

Qualified for the 2018 Challenger Cup
