= Denys Ostrovskyi =

Ukrainian footballer

Personal information
- Full name: Denys Volodymyrovych Ostrovskyi
- Date of birth: 20 August 1998 (age 28)
- Place of birth: Kyiv, Ukraine
- Height: 1.80 m (5 ft 11 in)
- Position: Left winger

Team information
- Current team: GKS Wikielec
- Number: 16

Youth career
- 2008–2011: Zmina Kyiv
- 2011–2013: Zmina-Obolon Kyiv
- 2013–2015: DVUFK Dnipropetrovsk
- 2017–2018: Obolon Kyiv

Senior career*
Years	Team	Apps	(Gls)
2016–2017	→ Obolon-2 Bucha	11	(1)
2018–2021	Obolon Kyiv	26	(2)
2019–2020	→ Obolon-2 Bucha	15	(3)
2020	→ Kremin Kremenchuk (loan)	11	(0)
2021	Polissya Zhytomyr	14	(2)
2021–2022	Podillya Khmelnytskyi	20	(4)
2022	Olimpia Elbląg	6	(0)
2022–2023	Tomasovia Tomaszów Lubelski	23	(8)
2023–2024	Orlęta Radzyń Podlaski	18	(3)
2024–	GKS Wikielec	19	(1)
- * Club domestic league appearances and goals as of 18:05, 18 June 2025 (UTC)

Denys Volodymyrovych Ostrovskyi (Ukrainian: Денис Володимирович Островський; born 20 August 1998) is a Ukrainian professional footballer who plays as a left winger for Polish III liga club GKS Wikielec.

== Honours ==
GKS Wikielec

- Polish Cup (Warmia-Masuria regionals): 2024–25
