= 2018 FIVB Men's Volleyball Challenger Cup qualification (CSV) =

The South American section of the 2018 FIVB Men's Volleyball Challenger Cup qualification acted as a qualifier event for the 2018 FIVB Men's Volleyball Challenger Cup for national teams that were members of the Confederación Sudamericana de Voleibol (CSV). The tournament was held in Santiago, Chile from 18 to 20 May 2018. The winners Chile qualified for the 2018 Challenger Cup.

== Qualification ==
4 CSV national teams entered qualification.

- Chile (Hosts)
- Bolivia
- Paraguay
- Peru

== Venue ==
- Centro Nacional de Entrenamiento Olímpico, Santiago, Chile

== Pool standing procedure ==
1. Number of matches won
2. Match points
3. Sets ratio
4. Points ratio
5. Result of the last match between the tied teams

Match won 3–0 or 3–1: 3 match points for the winner, 0 match points for the loser
Match won 3–2: 2 match points for the winner, 1 match point for the loser

== Round robin ==
- All times are Chile Standard Time (UTC−04:00).

Pos	Team	Pld	W	L	Pts	SW	SL	SR	SPW	SPL	SPR
1	Chile	3	3	0	9	9	0	MAX	225	124	1.815
2	Peru	3	2	1	6	6	3	2.000	205	172	1.192
3	Paraguay	3	1	2	3	3	7	0.429	166	227	0.731
4	Bolivia	3	0	3	0	1	9	0.111	170	243	0.700

Date	Time		Score		Set 1	Set 2	Set 3	Set 4	Set 5	Total	Report
18 May	19:00	Paraguay	0–3	Peru	13–25	15–25	16–25			44–75	Result
18 May	21:00	Chile	3–0	Bolivia	25–14	25–10	25–16			75–40	Result
19 May	16:00	Peru	3–0	Bolivia	25–15	25–18	25–20			75–53	Result
19 May	18:00	Chile	3–0	Paraguay	25–8	25–10	25–11			75–29	Result
20 May	16:00	Paraguay	3–1	Bolivia	25–17	18–25	25–13	25–22		93–77	Result
20 May	18:00	Chile	3–0	Peru	25–17	25–20	25–18			75–55	Result

== Final standing ==
Rank	Team
1	Chile
2	Peru
3	Paraguay
4	Bolivia

Qualified for the 2018 Challenger Cup
