= 2026 FIVB Men's Volleyball Nations League =

2026世界男排联赛 (Chinese); 2026 Shìjiè Nánpái Liánsài

Tournament details
- Host country: China
- City: Ningbo (final round)
- Dates: 10 June – 2 August
- Teams: 18 (from 4 confederations)
- Venue: 10 (in 10 host cities)

Final positions
- Champions: Poland (3rd title)
- Runners-up: United States
- Third place: Slovenia
- Fourth place: Japan
- Relegated: Canada

Tournament awards
- MVP: (Poland) Tomasz Fornal
- Best Scorer: (Bulgaria) Aleksandar Nikolov
- Best Attacker: (Bulgaria) Aleksandar Nikolov
- Best Blocker: (Canada) Jackson Howe
- Best Server: (Ukraine) Dmytro Yanchuk
- Best Setter: (France) Antoine Brizard
- Best Digger: (Argentina) Franco Massimino
- Best Receiver: (France) Mathis Henno

Tournament statistics
- Matches played: 116
- Attendance: 399,875 (3,447 per match)

The 2026 FIVB Men's Volleyball Nations League was the eighth edition of the FIVB Men's Volleyball Nations League, an annual men's international volleyball tournament. It took place from 10 June to 2 August 2026, with the final round held at the Beilun Gymnasium in Ningbo, China.

Following the results of the 2025 Nations League, the Netherlands were relegated and replaced by Belgium as the highest-ranked non-VNL team in the FIVB World Rankings.

Poland claimed their second consecutive and third overall VNL title by defeating the United States 3–2 in the final match. With the victory, Poland extended their streak of podium finishes in the tournament. In the third-place match, Slovenia defeated Japan 3–1 to secure the bronze medal, marking their first-ever podium finish in the history of the competition. Tomasz Fornal of Poland was awarded the tournament's MVP title.

== Host selection ==
In January 2026, the FIVB announced China as the host for the Men's Volleyball Nations League (VNL) Finals. Ningbo was selected to stage the event for the second consecutive year, following its successful hosting of the 2025 edition.

== Teams ==
=== Qualification ===
The tournament features 18 national teams. Following the 2025 season, the Netherlands were excluded after finishing last among the teams and replaced by Belgium, who earned the right as the highest-ranked non-VNL team in the FIVB World Rankings.

List of 2026 VNL participating teams
Country	Confederation	Previous appearances			Best performance
Country	Confederation	Total	First	Last	Best performance
Argentina	CSV	7	2018	2025	5th place (2023)
Belgium	CEV	0	Debut		—N/a
Brazil	CSV	7	2018	2025	Champions (2021)
Bulgaria	CEV	7	2018	2025	11th place (2018, 2025)
Canada	NORCECA	7	2018	2025	6th place (2024)
China	AVC	5	2018	2025	8th place (2025)
Cuba	NORCECA	3	2023	2025	7th place (2025)
France	CEV	7	2018	2025	Champions (2022, 2024)
Germany	CEV	7	2018	2025	9th place (2018)
Iran	AVC	7	2018	2025	5th place (2019)
Italy	CEV	7	2018	2025	Runners-up (2025)
Japan	AVC	7	2018	2025	Runners-up (2024)
Poland	CEV	7	2018	2025	Champions (2023, 2025)
Serbia	CEV	7	2018	2025	5th place (2018)
Slovenia	CEV	5	2021	2025	4th place (2021, 2024, 2025)
Turkey	CEV	2	2024	2025	16th place (2024)
Ukraine	CEV	1	2025		10th place (2025)
United States	NORCECA	7	2018	2025	Runners-up (2019, 2022, 2023)

=== Squads ===
Each participating national team submitted a final 30-player roster published via the VNL competition website. For each competition week of the tournament, teams select a match-day lineup consisting of 12 to 14 players from their registered 30-player squad.

== Format ==
=== Preliminary round ===
The format of play is generally the same as in the 2022 edition. Each week, six teams will compete during the pool phase. Each team plays 12 matches during the pool stage. During three weeks, each team plays four times in a table that is set up by an algorithm, with all teams playing 12 times in total at the end of the first phase. The eight best teams advance to the quarter-finals, while the last-placed team loses its place to the highest FIVB-ranked team that did not compete this year. The only country that has already qualified for this phase is China for hosting the finals and if it does not finish the first phase among the top eight, the top seven will qualify with the Chinese team being ranked 8th.

=== Final round ===
The VNL Finals will see the top eight teams moving directly to the knockout phase, which will consist of eight matches in total: four quarterfinals, two semi-finals, and the bronze and gold medal matches.

Final 8 direct elimination formula:

- The first ranked team will play a quarterfinal match against the eighth ranked team, the second ranked team will play a quarterfinal match against the seventh ranked team, the third ranked team will play a quarterfinal match against the sixth ranked team, and the fourth ranked team will play a quarterfinal match against the fifth ranked team.
- The national team of the hosting territory of the event will have a guaranteed berth for the Final round. If the host nation team do not finish in the top eight in the Preliminary round, they will replace the eighth place team and play as the eighth seed.

== Pool composition ==
The overview of pools was released on 28 January 2026.

Week 1
Pool 1 Canada	Pool 2 Brazil	Pool 3 China
Canada; Germany; Italy; United States; Turkey; France	Brazil; Argentina; Bulgaria; Serbia; Belgium; Iran	China; Cuba; Slovenia; Ukraine; Poland; Japan
Week 2
Pool 4 France	Pool 5 Poland	Pool 6 Slovenia
France; United States; Serbia; Japan; Iran; Cuba	Poland; Argentina; Germany; Belgium; Turkey; China	Slovenia; Italy; Canada; Bulgaria; Ukraine; Brazil
Week 3
Pool 7 Serbia	Pool 8 United States	Pool 9 Japan
Serbia; Slovenia; Germany; Iran; Turkey; Ukraine	United States; France; Brazil; Poland; China; Bulgaria	Japan; Italy; Canada; Argentina; Belgium; Cuba

== Venues ==
=== Preliminary round ===
Week 1
Pool 1	Pool 2	Pool 3
Ottawa, Canada	Brasília, Brazil	Linyi, China
TD Place Arena	Nilson Nelson Gymnasium	Linyi Olympic Sports Park Gymnasium
Capacity: 9,500	Capacity: 11,105	Capacity: 12,800
Week 2
Pool 4	Pool 5	Pool 6
Orléans, France	Gliwice, Poland	Ljubljana, Slovenia
CO'Met Arena	Gliwice Arena	Arena Stožice
Capacity: 10,000	Capacity: 13,572	Capacity: 12,480
Week 3
Pool 7	Pool 8	Pool 9
Belgrade, Serbia	Hoffman Estates, United States	Osaka, Japan
Belgrade Arena	Now Arena	Asue Arena Osaka
Capacity: 18,386	Capacity: 10,543	Capacity: 10,000

=== Final round ===
All matches
Ningbo, China
Beilun Gymnasium
Capacity: 8,000
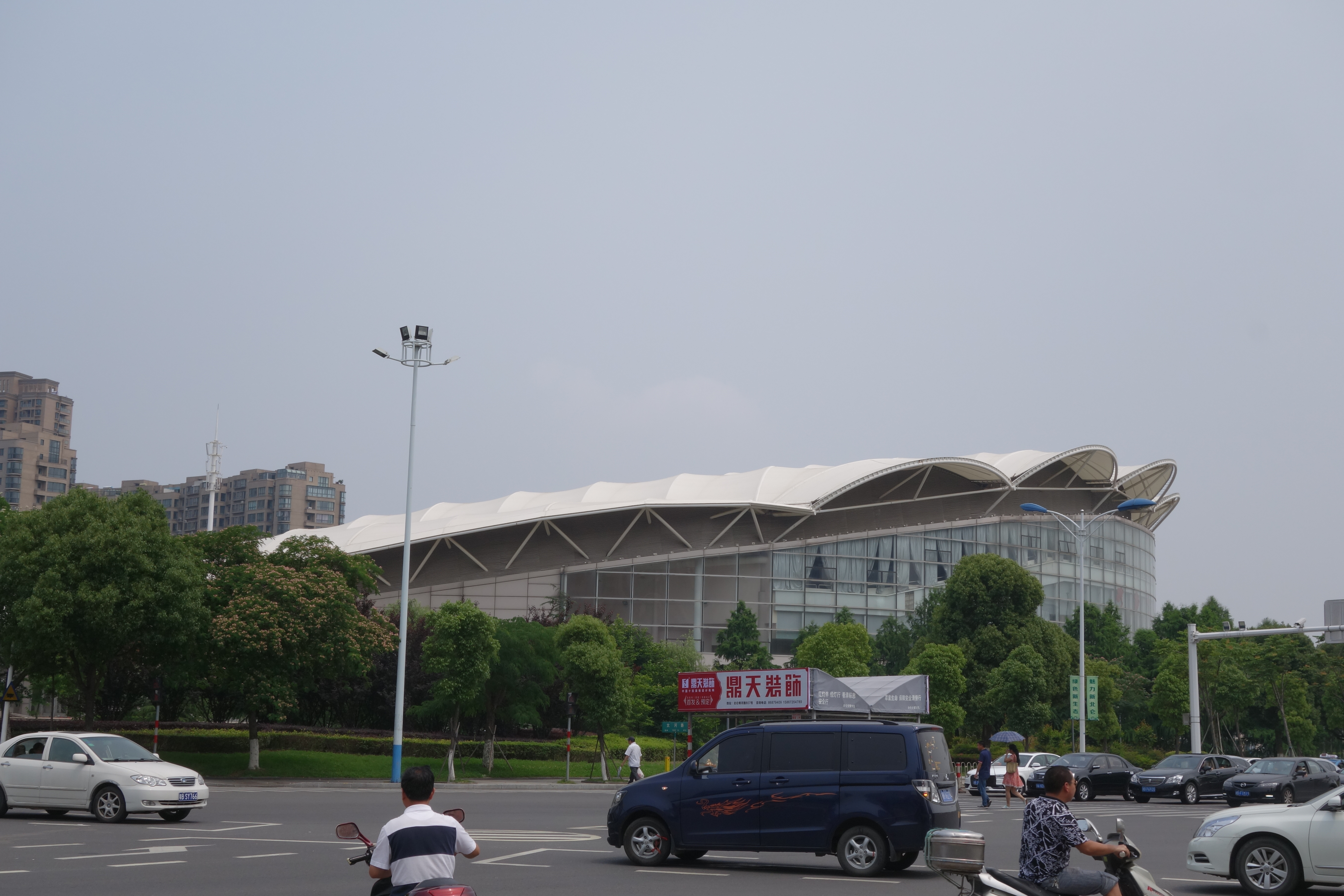

== Competition schedule ==
●	Preliminary round	●	Final round

Week 1 10–14 Jun	Week 2 24–28 Jun	Week 3 15–19 Jul	Week 4 29 Jul – 2 Aug
36 matches	36 matches	36 matches	8 matches

== Pool standing procedure ==
1. Total number of victories (matches won, matches lost)
2. In the event of a tie, the following first tiebreaker will apply, with the teams ranked by the most points gained per match as follows:
  - Match won 3–0 or 3–1: 3 points for the winner, 0 points for the loser
  - Match won 3–2: 2 points for the winner, 1 point for the loser
  - Match forfeited: 3 points for the winner, 0 points (0–25, 0–25, 0–25) for the loser
3. If teams are still tied after examining the number of victories and points gained, the FIVB will examine the results in order to break the tie in the following order:
  - Sets quotient: if two or more teams are tied on the number of points gained, they will be ranked by the quotient resulting from the division of the number of all sets won by the number of all sets lost.
  - Points quotient: if the tie persists based on the sets quotient, the teams will be ranked by the quotient resulting from the division of all points scored by the total of points lost during all sets.
  - If the tie persists based on the points quotient, the tie will be broken based on the team that won the match between the tied teams during the Round Robin Phase. When the tie in points quotient is between three or more teams, these teams will be ranked taking into consideration only the matches involving the teams in question.

== Preliminary round ==
=== Ranking ===
Pos	Team	Pld	W	L	Pts	SW	SL	SR	SPW	SPL	SPR	Qualification or relegation
1	Japan	12	12	0	30	36	15	2.400	1183	1074	1.101	Final round
2	Poland	12	10	2	29	34	15	2.267	1164	1051	1.108	Final round
3	Slovenia	12	10	2	26	32	17	1.882	1126	1067	1.055	Final round
4	Italy	12	8	4	26	30	18	1.667	1093	1040	1.051	Final round
5	United States	12	8	4	25	29	16	1.813	1049	960	1.093	Final round
6	Turkey	12	8	4	22	28	19	1.474	1054	1020	1.033	Final round
7	Ukraine	12	7	5	23	27	20	1.350	1082	1048	1.032	Final round
8	Bulgaria	12	7	5	20	24	23	1.043	1063	1039	1.023	
9	Brazil	12	7	5	19	23	21	1.095	1017	985	1.032	
10	France	12	6	6	16	23	24	0.958	1092	1087	1.005	
11	Serbia	12	5	7	16	19	25	0.760	961	1037	0.927	
12	Germany	12	5	7	15	23	28	0.821	1133	1162	0.975	
13	Belgium	12	4	8	12	17	28	0.607	990	1061	0.933	
14	Iran	12	3	9	11	18	30	0.600	1061	1123	0.945	
15	Argentina	12	3	9	10	18	31	0.581	1081	1133	0.954	
16	Cuba	12	3	9	10	16	29	0.552	963	1035	0.930	
17	Canada	12	1	11	10	19	34	0.559	1157	1209	0.957	Excluded from the Nations League
18	China (Note: Qualified as finals' host)	12	1	11	4	10	33	0.303	891	1029	0.866	Final round

Source: VNL 2026 – Men's standings

=== Week 1 ===
==== Pool 1 ====
- All times are Eastern Daylight Time (UTC−04:00).

Date	Time		Score		Set 1	Set 2	Set 3	Set 4	Set 5	Total	Attd	Report
10 Jun	11:00	Turkey	1–3	United States	20–25	25–20	20–25	23–25		88–95	5,369	P2 Boxscore
10 Jun	16:00	France	3–2	Italy	19–25	29–27	23–25	25–23	16–14	112–114	1,746	P2 Boxscore
10 Jun	19:30	Canada	2–3	Germany	26–24	19–25	25–20	21–25	13–15	104–109	2,475	P2 Boxscore
11 Jun	16:00	Germany	1–3	Italy	20–25	25–20	21–25	31–33		97–103	1,610	P2 Boxscore
11 Jun	19:30	Canada	3–1	France	25–20	25–18	21–25	27–25		98–88	2,762	P2 Boxscore
12 Jun	16:00	Germany	0–3	United States	22–25	15–25	20–25			57–75	1,937	P2 Boxscore
12 Jun	19:30	Turkey	3–0	France	25–23	27–25	25–21			77–69	2,335	P2 Boxscore
13 Jun	16:00	Canada	2–3	United States	25–20	35–33	24–26	21–25	11–15	116–119	5,702	P2 Boxscore
13 Jun	19:30	Turkey	0–3	Italy	27–29	14–25	20–25			61–79	3,684	P2 Boxscore
14 Jun	11:00	Germany	3–1	France	40–38	19–25	25–20	25–22		109–105	2,728	P2 Boxscore
14 Jun	14:30	Canada	2–3	Turkey	21–25	25–17	23–25	25–14	8–15	102–96	5,098	P2 Boxscore
14 Jun	18:00	United States	2–3	Italy	18–25	25–15	19–25	25–18	10–15	97–98	3,324	P2 Boxscore

==== Pool 2 ====
- All times are Brasília Time (UTC−03:00).

Date	Time		Score		Set 1	Set 2	Set 3	Set 4	Set 5	Total	Attd	Report
10 Jun	13:00	Belgium	3–1	Bulgaria	20–25	26–24	26–24	25–23		97–96	246	P2 Boxscore
10 Jun	16:30	Serbia	3–1	Argentina	25–23	25–20	25–27	26–24		101–94	768	P2 Boxscore
10 Jun	20:00	Brazil	3–1	Iran	25–21	23–25	25–15	25–23		98–84	3,470	P2 Boxscore
11 Jun	16:30	Bulgaria	3–0	Iran	25–23	25–19	25–21			75–63	512	P2 Boxscore
11 Jun	20:00	Brazil	3–1	Belgium	25–19	23–25	25–15	25–20		98–79	3,730	P2 Boxscore
12 Jun	16:30	Belgium	1–3	Serbia	18–25	26–24	21–25	22–25		87–99	658	P2 Boxscore
12 Jun	20:00	Iran	3–0	Argentina	25–23	25–19	25–23			75–65	1,226	P2 Boxscore
13 Jun	11:00	Brazil	3–0	Serbia	25–22	25–18	25–22			75–62	6,977	P2 Boxscore
13 Jun	15:30	Bulgaria	3–1	Argentina	23–25	25–23	25–15	25–23		98–86	420	P2 Boxscore
14 Jun	11:00	Belgium	3–2	Iran	25–23	25–22	23–25	17–25	15–12	105–107	523	P2 Boxscore
14 Jun	14:30	Bulgaria	0–3	Serbia	28–30	22–25	23–25			73–80	1,859	P2 Boxscore
14 Jun	18:00	Brazil	3–2	Argentina	18–25	24–26	25–19	25–23	15–9	107–102	7,976	P2 Boxscore

==== Pool 3 ====
- All times are China Standard Time (UTC+08:00).

Date	Time		Score		Set 1	Set 2	Set 3	Set 4	Set 5	Total	Attd	Report
10 Jun	13:00	Cuba	0–3	Poland	16–25	20–25	21–25			57–75	311	P2 Boxscore
10 Jun	16:30	China	2–3	Slovenia	17–25	25–20	25–20	23–25	10–15	100–105	1,635	P2 Boxscore
10 Jun	20:00	Ukraine	0–3	Japan	22–25	21–25	22–25			65–75	643	P2 Boxscore
11 Jun	16:30	China	1–3	Ukraine	17–25	25–21	20–25	22–25		84–96	2,613	P2 Boxscore
11 Jun	20:00	Slovenia	3–2	Poland	27–25	23–25	26–24	21–25	19–17	116–116	628	P2 Boxscore
12 Jun	16:30	Ukraine	3–0	Cuba	25–21	25–20	25–16			75–57	540	P2 Boxscore
12 Jun	20:00	Japan	3–2	Poland	25–21	21–25	25–21	22–25	17–15	110–107	2,063	P2 Boxscore
13 Jun	16:30	China	1–3	Japan	23–25	22–25	25–20	21–25		91–95	9,167	P2 Boxscore
13 Jun	20:00	Cuba	2–3	Slovenia	15–25	28–26	25–19	14–25	11–15	93–110	1,588	P2 Boxscore
14 Jun	13:00	Ukraine	2–3	Poland	25–19	25–18	22–25	21–25	11–15	104–102	1,121	P2 Boxscore
14 Jun	16:30	China	3–0	Cuba	25–21	25–19	25–23			75–63	6,793	P2 Boxscore
14 Jun	20:00	Slovenia	1–3	Japan	27–25	16–25	22–25	22–25		87–100	1,537	P2 Boxscore

=== Week 2 ===
==== Pool 4 ====
- All times are Central European Summer Time (UTC+02:00).

Date	Time		Score		Set 1	Set 2	Set 3	Set 4	Set 5	Total	Attd	Report
24 Jun	13:30	Serbia	1–3	Japan	17–25	15–25	25–22	16–25		73–97	2,600	P2 Boxscore
24 Jun	17:00	Cuba	0–3	United States	21–25	21–25	19–25			61–75	2,851	P2 Boxscore
24 Jun	20:30	France	3–2	Iran	25–21	23–25	25–21	24–26	17–15	114–108	2,766	P2 Boxscore
25 Jun	17:00	Iran	0–3	United States	23–25	20–25	29–31			72–81	1,775	P2 Boxscore
25 Jun	20:30	France	3–2	Cuba	25–22	21–25	25–27	25–20	15–13	111–107	3,275	P2 Boxscore
26 Jun	17:00	Iran	2–3	Japan	19–25	19–25	25–20	25–23	12–15	100–108	1,362	P2 Boxscore
26 Jun	20:30	Serbia	3–1	Cuba	25–19	13–25	25–23	25–22		88–89	1,092	P2 Boxscore
27 Jun	17:00	United States	2–3	Japan	25–18	21–25	25–20	22–25	13–15	106–103	3,606	P2 Boxscore
27 Jun	20:30	France	3–0	Serbia	25–23	25–16	25–22			75–61	5,940	P2 Boxscore
28 Jun	13:30	Iran	3–1	Cuba	25–22	25–21	20–25	30–28		100–96	6,000	P2 Boxscore
28 Jun	17:00	France	2–3	Japan	30–28	25–19	17–25	33–35	12–15	117–122	8,032	P2 Boxscore
28 Jun	20:30	Serbia	1–3	United States	12–25	23–25	26–24	17–25		78–99	1,275	P2 Boxscore

==== Pool 5 ====
- All times are Central European Summer Time (UTC+02:00).

Date	Time		Score		Set 1	Set 2	Set 3	Set 4	Set 5	Total	Attd	Report
24 Jun	13:00	China	0–3	Turkey	16–25	19–25	21–25			56–75	2,183	P2 Boxscore
24 Jun	16:30	Argentina	3–2	Germany	25–21	15–25	25–21	18–25	15–13	98–105	4,739	P2 Boxscore
24 Jun	20:00	Poland	3–2	Belgium	21–25	23–25	25–19	28–26	15–13	112–108	9,429	P2 Boxscore
25 Jun	16:30	China	1–3	Belgium	28–26	21–25	21–25	20–25		90–101	3,990	P2 Boxscore
25 Jun	20:00	Poland	3–2	Turkey	26–28	25–19	25–21	19–25	15–11	110–104	9,866	P2 Boxscore
26 Jun	16:30	China	0–3	Argentina	22–25	19–25	22–25			63–75	1,340	P2 Boxscore
26 Jun	20:00	Belgium	1–3	Germany	22–25	25–19	23–25	19–25		89–94	2,014	P2 Boxscore
27 Jun	17:00	Poland	3–1	Germany	23–25	25–16	25–17	25–15		98–73	11,600	P2 Boxscore
27 Jun	20:30	Turkey	3–2	Argentina	19–25	21–25	25–21	25–18	18–16	108–105	10,900	P2 Boxscore
28 Jun	13:00	China	1–3	Germany	20–25	20–25	25–22	19–25		84–97	2,414	P2 Boxscore
28 Jun	16:30	Belgium	0–3	Turkey	24–26	24–26	17–25			65–77	5,713	P2 Boxscore
28 Jun	20:00	Poland	3–1	Argentina	48–50	26–24	25–19	25–20		124–113	11,167	P2 Boxscore

==== Pool 6 ====
- All times are Central European Summer Time (UTC+02:00).

Date	Time		Score		Set 1	Set 2	Set 3	Set 4	Set 5	Total	Attd	Report
24 Jun	13:00	Bulgaria	3–2	Italy	18–25	25–20	25–23	19–25	15–9	102–102	890	P2 Boxscore
24 Jun	16:30	Ukraine	3–1	Brazil	29–27	22–25	25–22	25–21		101–95	760	P2 Boxscore
24 Jun	20:30	Slovenia	3–1	Canada	25–23	23–25	25–20	25–23		98–91	7,036	P2 Boxscore
25 Jun	16:30	Ukraine	3–0	Italy	25–23	25–19	25–16			75–58	532	P2 Boxscore
25 Jun	20:30	Slovenia	3–2	Bulgaria	19–25	25–21	17–25	26–24	15–6	102–101	3,841	P2 Boxscore
26 Jun	16:30	Ukraine	3–1	Canada	25–19	25–23	18–25	25–23		93–90	708	P2 Boxscore
26 Jun	20:00	Brazil	1–3	Italy	19–25	23–25	25–22	23–25		90–97	1,175	P2 Boxscore
27 Jun	16:30	Bulgaria	3–2	Canada	25–27	25–22	21–25	25–18	15–11	111–103	610	P2 Boxscore
27 Jun	20:30	Slovenia	3–0	Brazil	27–25	25–17	25–20			77–62	5,117	P2 Boxscore
28 Jun	13:00	Bulgaria	3–1	Ukraine	25–20	18–25	25–23	25–17		93–85	619	P2 Boxscore
28 Jun	16:30	Canada	2–3	Brazil	17–25	25–23	26–28	25–22	15–17	108–115	686	P2 Boxscore
28 Jun	20:30	Slovenia	1–3	Italy	25–23	19–25	18–25	20–25		82–98	5,973	P2 Boxscore

=== Week 3 ===
==== Pool 7 ====
- All times are Central European Summer Time (UTC+02:00).

Date	Time		Score		Set 1	Set 2	Set 3	Set 4	Set 5	Total	Attd	Report
15 Jul	13:00	Germany	1–3	Slovenia	17–25	17–25	25–23	26–28		85–101	290	P2 Boxscore
15 Jul	16:30	Ukraine	3–1	Iran	25–22	25–21	29–31	25–19		104–93	450	P2 Boxscore
15 Jul	20:00	Serbia	0–3	Turkey	23–25	19–25	18–25			60–75	2,540	P2 Boxscore
16 Jul	16:30	Iran	3–2	Germany	25–22	26–28	18–25	25–20	15–12	109–107	325	P2 Boxscore
16 Jul	20:00	Serbia	3–1	Ukraine	22–25	25–17	25–21	25–23		97–86	2,200	P2 Boxscore
17 Jul	16:30	Turkey	3–2	Ukraine	25–27	20–25	25–23	25–16	15–11	110–102	310	P2 Boxscore
17 Jul	20:00	Iran	0–3	Slovenia	25–27	19–25	24–26			68–78	550	P2 Boxscore
18 Jul	16:30	Turkey	1–3	Slovenia	22–25	25–20	21–25	23–25		91–95	610	P2 Boxscore
18 Jul	20:00	Serbia	2–3	Germany	25–21	28–26	16–25	18–25	13–15	100–112	3,150	P2 Boxscore
19 Jul	13:00	Turkey	3–1	Iran	17–25	25–22	25–16	25–19		92–82	305	P2 Boxscore
19 Jul	16:30	Ukraine	3–1	Germany	25–23	20–25	25–22	26–24		96–94	610	P2 Boxscore
19 Jul	20:00	Serbia	0–3	Slovenia	19–25	21–25	22–25			62–75	2,450	P2 Boxscore

==== Pool 8 ====
- All times are Central Daylight Time (UTC−05:00).

Date	Time		Score		Set 1	Set 2	Set 3	Set 4	Set 5	Total	Attd	Report
15 Jul	12:00	Bulgaria	0–3	Poland	19–25	17–25	17–25			53–75	1,972	P2 Boxscore
15 Jul	16:00	France	0–3	Brazil	23–25	23–25	19–25			65–75	1,279	P2 Boxscore
15 Jul	20:00	United States	3–0	China	25–19	25–13	25–20			75–52	2,626	P2 Boxscore
16 Jul	16:00	China	0–3	France	21–25	19–25	20–25			60–75	432	P2 Boxscore
16 Jul	20:00	United States	3–0	Brazil	25–23	25–19	25–18			75–60	5,349	P2 Boxscore
17 Jul	16:00	China	1–3	Bulgaria	25–22	14–25	20–25	20–25		79–97	931	P2 Boxscore
17 Jul	20:00	Brazil	0–3	Poland	22–25	26–28	19–25			67–78	5,327	P2 Boxscore
18 Jul	16:00	France	1–3	Poland	25–17	22–25	21–25	18–25		86–92	4,543	P2 Boxscore
18 Jul	20:00	United States	1–3	Bulgaria	25–27	25–22	24–26	18–25		92–100	7,484	P2 Boxscore
19 Jul	12:00	China	0–3	Brazil	16–25	20–25	21–25			57–75	747	P2 Boxscore
19 Jul	16:00	Bulgaria	0–3	France	21–25	22–25	21–25			64–75	1,593	P2 Boxscore
19 Jul	20:00	United States	0–3	Poland	20–25	21–25	19–25			60–75	7,720	P2 Boxscore

==== Pool 9 ====
- All times are Japan Standard Time (UTC+09:00).

Date	Time		Score		Set 1	Set 2	Set 3	Set 4	Set 5	Total	Attd	Report
15 Jul	12:00	Canada	2–3	Argentina	26–24	25–22	23–25	13–25	17–19	104–115	3,997	P2 Boxscore
15 Jul	15:30	Belgium	0–3	Cuba	23–25	19–25	20–25			62–75	4,565	P2 Boxscore
15 Jul	19:20	Japan	3–2	Italy	24–26	25–19	25–20	23–25	15–12	112–102	7,118	P2 Boxscore
16 Jul	15:30	Belgium	0–3	Italy	20–25	22–25	22–25			64–75	4,467	P2 Boxscore
16 Jul	19:20	Japan	3–2	Canada	18–25	24–26	29–27	25–19	15–11	111–108	7,377	P2 Boxscore
17 Jul	15:30	Cuba	3–2	Argentina	17–25	25–19	22–25	25–21	15–12	104–102	3,129	P2 Boxscore
17 Jul	19:20	Japan	3–0	Belgium	25–20	25–22	25–16			75–58	7,273	P2 Boxscore
18 Jul	13:00	Canada	0–3	Cuba	22–25	21–25	27–29			70–79	5,046	P2 Boxscore
18 Jul	19:20	Argentina	0–3	Italy	22–25	22–25	22–25			66–75	6,900	P2 Boxscore
19 Jul	12:00	Belgium	3–0	Canada	25–22	25–22	25–19			75–63	5,809	P2 Boxscore
19 Jul	15:30	Cuba	1–3	Italy	25–17	19–25	21–25	17–25		82–92	6,738	P2 Boxscore
19 Jul	19:20	Japan	3–0	Argentina	25–22	25–22	25–16			75–60	6,960	P2 Boxscore

== Final round ==
- All times are China Standard Time (UTC+08:00).

Quarter-finals
29 July
Japan	3
China	1
30 July
Italy	0
United States	3
29 July
Slovenia	3
Turkey	0
30 July
Poland	3
Ukraine	1

Semi-finals
1 August
Japan	2
United States	3
1 August
Slovenia	0
Poland	3

Final
2 August
United States	2
Poland	3
Third place match
2 August
Japan	1
Slovenia	3

=== Quarter-finals ===
Date	Time		Score		Set 1	Set 2	Set 3	Set 4	Set 5	Total	Attd	Report
29 Jul	15:00	Slovenia	3–0	Turkey	25–21	35–33	39–37			99–91	2,400	P2 Boxscore
29 Jul	19:30	Japan	3–1	China	23–25	25–23	25–16	25–23		98–87	5,763	P2 Boxscore
30 Jul	15:00	Italy	0–3	United States	22–25	21–25	21–25			64–75	3,458	P2 Boxscore
30 Jul	19:30	Poland	3–1	Ukraine	25–22	22–25	25–20	25–17		97–84	3,491	P2 Boxscore

=== Semi-finals ===
Date	Time		Score		Set 1	Set 2	Set 3	Set 4	Set 5	Total	Attd	Report
1 Aug	15:00	Slovenia	0–3	Poland	16–25	19–25	17–25			52–75	4,835	P2 Boxscore
1 Aug	19:30	Japan	2–3	United States	19–25	25–23	25–20	19–25	13–15	101–108	5,852	P2 Boxscore

=== Third place match ===
Date	Time		Score		Set 1	Set 2	Set 3	Set 4	Set 5	Total	Attd	Report
2 Aug	15:40	Japan	1–3	Slovenia	21–25	28–26	22–25	22–25		93–101	5,389	P2 Boxscore

=== Final ===
Date	Time		Score		Set 1	Set 2	Set 3	Set 4	Set 5	Total	Attd	Report
2 Aug	19:30	United States	2–3	Poland	21–25	25–23	27–25	23–25	10–15	106–113	5,865	P2 Boxscore

== Final standing ==
Rank	Team
1st place, gold medalist(s)	Poland
2nd place, silver medalist(s)	United States
3rd place, bronze medalist(s)	Slovenia
4	Japan
5	Italy
6	Turkey
7	Ukraine
8	China
9	Bulgaria
10	Brazil
11	France
12	Serbia
13	Germany
14	Belgium
15	Iran
16	Argentina
17	Cuba
18	Canada

2026 Men's VNL champions

Poland
Third title

14–man roster
Jakub Popiwczak, Marcin Komenda, Bartłomiej Lemański, Wilfredo León, Aleksander Śliwka (c), Artur Szalpuk, Kamil Semeniuk, Maksymilian Granieczny, Tomasz Fornal, Bartłomiej Bołądź, Szymon Jakubiszak, Kewin Sasak, Jakub Nowak, Jan Firlej
Head coach
Nikola Grbić

== Awards ==
According to the competition regulations, individual prize money totaling $100,000 would be awarded. A total of $70,000 was distributed among the statistical leaders of the preliminary phase ($10,000 per category), while a $30,000 prize will be allocated for the MVP, selected from the gold medal match participants via a combined voting process between fans and designated volleyball experts.

Bulgaria's Aleksandar Nikolov was the only player selected in two statistical categories, leading both total points scored and total attack points. Canada, Ukraine, and Argentina each earned their first individual VNL preliminary awards through Jackson Howe, Dmytro Yanchuk, and Franco Massimino, respectively.

- Most valuable player
  (Poland) Tomasz Fornal
- Best scorer
  (Bulgaria) Aleksandar Nikolov
- Best attacker
  (Bulgaria) Aleksandar Nikolov
- Best blocker
  (Canada) Jackson Howe
- Best server
  (Ukraine) Dmytro Yanchuk
- Best setter
  (France) Antoine Brizard
- Best digger
  (Argentina) Franco Massimino
- Best receiver
  (France) Mathis Henno

== Statistics leaders ==
=== Preliminary round ===
Statistics leaders correct at the end of preliminary round.

Best Scorers (Note: Best scorers determined by scored points from spike, block and serve.)
	Player	Attacks	Blocks	Serves	Total
1	(Bulgaria) Aleksandar Nikolov	247	11	20	278
2	(Belgium) Ferre Reggers	246	9	13	268
3	(Slovenia) Nik Mujanović	196	15	16	227
4	(Turkey) Adis Lagumdžija	177	24	18	219
5	(Japan) Ran Takahashi	172	15	21	208

Best Attackers (Note: Best attackers determined by successful spikes.)
	Player	Spikes	Faults	Shots	%	Total
1	(Bulgaria) Aleksandar Nikolov	247	77	134	53.93	458
2	(Belgium) Ferre Reggers	246	92	159	49.50	497
3	(Slovenia) Nik Mujanović	196	53	130	51.72	379
4	(Turkey) Adis Lagumdžija	177	50	161	45.62	388
5	(Japan) Ran Takahashi	172	48	110	52.12	330

Best Blockers (Note: Best blockers determined by the stuff blocks, faults and rebounds.)
	Player	Blocks	Faults	Rebounds	Total
1	(Canada) Jackson Howe	45	70	75	190
2	(Turkey) Bedirhan Bülbül	38	47	45	130
3	(Poland) Bartłomiej Lemański	28	29	36	93
4	(Ukraine) Yurii Semeniuk	28	44	61	133
5	(Bulgaria) Aleks Grozdanov	27	48	49	124

Best Servers (Note: Best servers determined by aces, faults and hits.)
	Player	Aces	Faults	Hits	%	Total
1	(Ukraine) Dmytro Yanchuk	21	35	101	13.38	157
1	(Japan) Ran Takahashi	21	27	145	10.88	193
3	(Bulgaria) Aleksandar Nikolov	20	49	115	10.87	184
4	(Turkey) Adis Lagumdžija	18	41	109	10.71	168
5	(Bulgaria) Simeon Nikolov	17	48	135	8.50	200
5	(Bulgaria) Asparuh Asparuhov	17	38	112	10.18	167
5	(Brazil) Darlan Souza	17	51	58	13.49	126

Best Setters (Note: Best setters determined by running setts, faults and still sets.)
	Player	Running	Faults	Still	Total
1	(France) Antoine Brizard	396	5	575	976
2	(Brazil) Fernando Kreling	390	8	436	834
3	(Slovenia) Uroš Planinšič	362	4	486	852
4	(Iran) Arshia Behnezhad	324	6	672	1002
5	(Turkey) Murat Yenipazar	316	2	616	934

Best Diggers (Note: Best diggers determined by successful digs, faults and receptions.)
	Player	Digs	Faults	Receptions	Total
1	(Argentina) Franco Massimino	112	43	48	203
2	(Turkey) Berkay Bayraktar	97	38	38	173
3	(Belgium) Gorik Lantsoght	91	45	38	174
4	(Serbia) Stefan Negić	88	37	38	163
5	(Italy) Gabriele Laurenzano	84	28	31	143

Best Receivers (Note: Best receivers determined by efficient receptions, faults and serve receptions.)
	Player	Excellents	Faults	Serve	Total
1	(France) Mathis Henno	93	11	229	333
2	(Turkey) Berkay Bayraktar	74	12	193	279
3	(Iran) Mohammad Reza Hazratpour	67	6	168	241
4	(Cuba) Yonder García	66	11	138	215
5	(United States) Matt Anderson	61	13	161	235

=== Final round ===
Statistics leaders correct at the end of final round.

Best Scorers
	Player	Spikes	Blocks	Serves	Total
1	(United States) Jake Hanes	51	3	12	66
2	(United States) Matt Anderson	51	3	5	59
3	(Slovenia) Rok Možič	53	0	2	55
4	(Japan) Ran Takahashi	49	2	3	54
5	(Slovenia) Nik Mujanović	40	6	4	50

Best Attackers
	Player	Spikes	Faults	Shots	Total
1	(Slovenia) Rok Možič	53	16	30	99
2	(United States) Matt Anderson	51	7	30	88
2	(United States) Jake Hanes	51	16	21	88
4	(Japan) Ran Takahashi	49	13	43	105
5	(Slovenia) Nik Mujanović	40	17	43	100
5	(Poland) Bartłomiej Bołądź	40	8	28	76

Best Blockers
	Player	Blocks	Faults	Rebounds	Total
1	(Poland) Bartłomiej Lemański	10	8	11	29
2	(Poland) Bartłomiej Bołądź	8	4	16	28
3	(United States) Merrick MacHenry	7	14	19	40
4	(Japan) Larry Ik Evbade-Dan	6	10	19	35
4	(Slovenia) Sašo Štalekar	6	10	11	27
4	(Slovenia) Nik Mujanović	6	3	17	26

Best Servers
	Player	Aces	Faults	Hits	Total
1	(United States) Jake Hanes	12	17	29	58
2	(Poland) Wilfredo León	10	16	24	50
3	(Poland) Tomasz Fornal	7	13	27	47
4	(United States) Matt Anderson	5	11	27	43
5	(Slovenia) Nik Mujanović	4	10	29	43

Best Setters
	Player	Running	Faults	Still	Total
1	(United States) Micah Christenson	102	0	163	265
2	(Slovenia) Uroš Planinšič	92	2	180	274
3	(Japan) Hideomi Fukatsu	86	0	180	266
4	(Poland) Marcin Komenda	63	0	156	219
5	(China) Wang Hebin	34	0	55	89

Best Diggers
	Player	Digs	Faults	Receptions	Total
1	(Slovenia) Grega Okroglič	28	14	11	53
1	(Poland) Jakub Popiwczak	28	10	8	46
3	(Japan) Ran Takahashi	27	9	4	40
3	(United States) Erik Shoji	27	12	8	47
5	(Poland) Marcin Komenda	26	10	6	42

Best Receivers
	Player	Excellents	Faults	Serve	Total
1	(United States) Matt Anderson	16	3	64	83
2	(Japan) Ran Takahashi	14	1	37	52
3	(Slovenia) Rok Možič	13	3	48	64
4	(Slovenia) Tine Urnaut	12	6	36	54
4	(Poland) Tomasz Fornal	12	1	35	48

== See also ==
- 2026 FIVB Women's Volleyball Nations League
- 2026 FIVB Volleyball Boys' U17 World Championship
