= 2018 AVC Men's Challenger =

The Asian section of the 2018 AVC Men's Challenger acted as a qualifier event for the 2018 FIVB Men's Volleyball Challenger Cup for national teams that were members of the Asian Volleyball Confederation (AVC). The tournament was held in Almaty, Kazakhstan from 18 to 20 May 2018. The winners, Kazakhstan, qualified for the 2018 Challenger Cup.

== Qualification ==
3 AVC national teams entered qualification.

- Kazakhstan (Hosts)
- Chinese Taipei
- Pakistan

== Venue ==
All matches
Almaty, Kazakhstan
Baluan Sholak Sports Palace
Capacity: 5,000
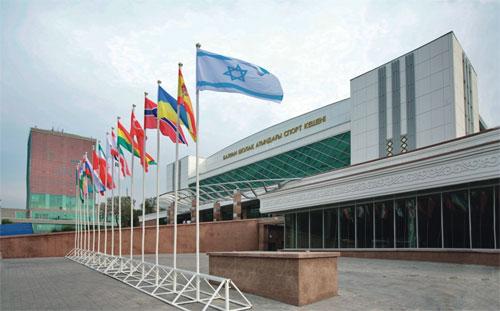

== Pool standing procedure ==
1. Number of matches won
2. Match points
3. Sets ratio
4. Points ratio
5. Result of the last match between the tied teams

Match won 3–0 or 3–1: 3 match points for the winner, 0 match points for the loser
Match won 3–2: 2 match points for the winner, 1 match point for the loser

== Round robin ==
- All times are Almaty Time (UTC+06:00).

Pos	Team	Pld	W	L	Pts	SW	SL	SR	SPW	SPL	SPR
1	Kazakhstan	2	2	0	6	6	1	6.000	170	140	1.214
2	Pakistan	2	1	1	3	4	3	1.333	152	158	0.962
3	Chinese Taipei	2	0	2	0	0	6	0.000	129	153	0.843

Date	Time		Score		Set 1	Set 2	Set 3	Set 4	Set 5	Total	Report
18 May	17:00	Chinese Taipei	0–3	Pakistan	22–25	24–26	19–25			65–76	P2 P3
19 May	17:00	Kazakhstan	3–1	Pakistan	18–25	25–16	25–17	25–18		93–76	P2 P3
20 May	17:00	Chinese Taipei	0–3	Kazakhstan	19–25	25–27	20–25			64–77	P2 P3

== Final standing ==
Rank	Team
1	Kazakhstan
2	Pakistan
3	Chinese Taipei

Qualified for the 2018 Challenger Cup
