= Dmytro Yanchuk =

Ukrainian footballer

Personal information
- Full name: Dmytro Yuriyovych Yanchuk
- Date of birth: 26 September 2002 (age 24)
- Place of birth: Lypyny, Volyn Oblast, Ukraine
- Height: 1.72 m (5 ft 8 in)
- Position: Left winger

Team information
- Current team: Łada Biłgoraj
- Number: 9

Youth career
- 2014–2017: Volyn Lutsk
- 2017–2019: VIK-Volyn Volodymyr-Volynskyi

Senior career*
Years	Team	Apps	(Gls)
2019–2022	Volyn Lutsk	10	(0)
2020–2021	→ Volyn-2 Lutsk	22	(1)
2022–2023	Bug Hanna	24	(4)
2023–2024	Orlęta Radzyń Podlaski	8	(0)
2024–	Łada Biłgoraj	43	(2)
- * Club domestic league appearances and goals as of 14:50, 27 June 2025 (UTC)

Dmytro Yuriyovych Yanchuk (Ukrainian: Дмитро Юрійович Янчук; born 26 September 2002) is a Ukrainian professional footballer who plays as a left winger for Polish club Łada Biłgoraj.

== Honours ==
Łada Biłgoraj

- Polish Cup (Zamość regionals): 2024–25
