= 2026 Men's European Volleyball Championship Pool C =

Pool C is one of four pools of the preliminary round of the 2026 Men's European Volleyball Championship. The pool consists of the Belgium, Denmark, Estonia, co-hosts Finland, Netherlands and Serbia. The matches were played at the Nokia Arena in Tampere from 10 to 17 September 2026. The top four teams will advance to the final round. Belgium managed to top the group after Estonia beat a previously unbeaten Finland in the last game. The teams joining them were Finland, Serbia and Denmark. The Danes made the knockout stage for the first time ever.

== Teams ==
Team	Qualification method	Date of qualification	Appearance(s)				Previous best performance (Note: Bold text indicates they hosted that edition.)	WR (Note: World ranking at start of tournament.)
Team	Qualification method	Date of qualification	Total	First	Last	Streak	Previous best performance	WR
Netherlands	Top eight in 2023	9 September 2023	29th	1948	2023	7	Champions (1997)	TBD
Serbia (Note: Competed as SFR Yugoslavia from 1956 to 1991, and as FR Yugoslavia/Serbia and Montenegro from 1998 to 2006.)	Top eight in 2023	10 September 2023	30th	2007	2023	15	Champions (2001, 2011, 2019)	TBD
Finland	Host nation	14 March 2024	21st	1955	2023	10	Fourth place (2007)	TBD
Belgium	Pool B winner	9 August 2025	19th	1948	2023	4	Fourth place (2017)	TBD
Estonia	Pool D winner	13 August 2025	8th	2009	2023	6	Eleventh place (2015)	TBD
Denmark	Pool A winner	13 August 2025	6th	1958	2023	2	Twelfth place (2013)	TBD

== Venue ==
The Nokia Arena would host games. Constructed in time for the 2022 IIHF World Championship, it has since hosted the 2023 IIHF World Championship and EuroBasket 2025, plus numerous high-profile concerts.

2026 Men's European Volleyball Championship Pool C is located in Finland	Tampere
2026 Men's European Volleyball Championship Pool C is located in Finland	Nokia Arena
2026 Men's European Volleyball Championship Pool C is located in Finland	Capacity: 13,455

== Group standings ==
Pos	Team	Pld	W	L	Pts	SW	SL	SR	SPW	SPL	SPR	Qualification
1	Belgium	5	4	1	13	14	6	2.333	454	401	1.132	Round of 16
2	Finland (H)	5	4	1	11	14	7	2.000	472	431	1.095	Round of 16
3	Serbia	5	3	2	7	9	11	0.818	442	463	0.955	Round of 16
4	Denmark	5	2	3	7	9	9	1.000	407	396	1.028	Round of 16
5	Estonia	5	2	3	5	8	12	0.667	440	472	0.932	
6	Netherlands	5	0	5	2	6	15	0.400	433	485	0.893	

Source: CEV
(H) Host

=== Group progression ===
The table listed the results of teams in each round.

Win	Loss

Team ╲ Round	1	2	3	4	5
Finland	W	W	W	W	L
Estonia	L	L	L	W	W
Serbia	W	L	W	W	L
Belgium	W	L	W	W	W
Netherlands	L	L	L	L	L
Denmark	L	W	W	L	L

Source: CEV

=== Positions by round ===
The table listed the positions of teams in each round.

Advance to the knockout stage

Team ╲ Round	1	2	3	4	5
Finland	1	1	1	1	2
Estonia	4	5	6	5	5
Serbia	3	4	4	3	3
Belgium	2	3	2	2	1
Netherlands	5	6	5	6	6
Denmark	6	2	3	4	4

Source: CEV

== Matches ==
- All times are Eastern European Summer Time (UTC+03:00).

=== Finland vs Denmark ===
10 September 2026; 20:00; Match duration: 1hr 23min	Finland	3–0	Denmark	(Finland) Nokia Arena, Tampere; Attendance: 6,583; Referees: Igor Porvaznik (SVK), Sergej Rodin (LIT)
10 September 2026; 20:00; Match duration: 1hr 23min	(25–22, 25–17, 25–20); Report			(Finland) Nokia Arena, Tampere; Attendance: 6,583; Referees: Igor Porvaznik (SVK), Sergej Rodin (LIT)
10 September 2026; 20:00; Match duration: 1hr 23min	Scoring leaders			(Finland) Nokia Arena, Tampere; Attendance: 6,583; Referees: Igor Porvaznik (SVK), Sergej Rodin (LIT)
Jokela, L. Marttila 17		Total	Dahl 13
L. Marttila (15/27)		Attack	Dahl (10/25)
Savonsalmi 2		Block	Mikelsons 2
three players 2		Serve	Dahl (3/14)

=== Netherlands vs Belgium ===
11 September 2026; 17:00; Match duration: 1hr 37min	Netherlands	1–3	Belgium	(Finland) Nokia Arena, Tampere; Attendance: 1,753; Referees: Paul Catalin Szabo-Alexi (ROU), Ilja Minins (LAT)
11 September 2026; 17:00; Match duration: 1hr 37min	(14–25, 25–18, 17–25, 14–25); Report			(Finland) Nokia Arena, Tampere; Attendance: 1,753; Referees: Paul Catalin Szabo-Alexi (ROU), Ilja Minins (LAT)
11 September 2026; 17:00; Match duration: 1hr 37min	Scoring leaders			(Finland) Nokia Arena, Tampere; Attendance: 1,753; Referees: Paul Catalin Szabo-Alexi (ROU), Ilja Minins (LAT)
Meijs 25		Total	Deroo 19
Meijs (22/46)		Attack	Deroo, Reggers 15
'Three players' 2		Block	'Three players' 3
'Four players' 1		Serve	'Four players' 1

=== Serbia vs Estonia ===
11 September 2026; 20:00; Match duration: 2hr 15min	Serbia	3–1	Estonia	(Finland) Nokia Arena, Tampere; Attendance: 2,203; Referees: Sébastien Jacob (FRA), Igor Porvaznik (SVK)
11 September 2026; 20:00; Match duration: 2hr 15min	(25–23, 26–24, 26–28, 25–22); Report			(Finland) Nokia Arena, Tampere; Attendance: 2,203; Referees: Sébastien Jacob (FRA), Igor Porvaznik (SVK)
11 September 2026; 20:00; Match duration: 2hr 15min	Scoring leaders			(Finland) Nokia Arena, Tampere; Attendance: 2,203; Referees: Sébastien Jacob (FRA), Igor Porvaznik (SVK)
Luburić 20		Total	Tammearu 18
Luburić (17/26)		Attack	Tammearu (17/45)
Mašulović 4		Block	Saaremaa 6
Marinović (2/17)		Serve	Jefanov (2/6)

=== Denmark vs Netherlands ===
12 September 2026; 17:00; Match duration: 1hr 27min	Denmark	3–0	Netherlands	(Finland) Nokia Arena, Tampere; Attendance: 6,124; Referees: Sergej Rodin (LTU), Paul Catalin Szabo-Alexi (ROU)
12 September 2026; 17:00; Match duration: 1hr 27min	(25–17, 25–20, 25–20); Report			(Finland) Nokia Arena, Tampere; Attendance: 6,124; Referees: Sergej Rodin (LTU), Paul Catalin Szabo-Alexi (ROU)
12 September 2026; 17:00; Match duration: 1hr 27min	Scoring leaders			(Finland) Nokia Arena, Tampere; Attendance: 6,124; Referees: Sergej Rodin (LTU), Paul Catalin Szabo-Alexi (ROU)
Dahl 18		Total	Koops, Meijs 10
Dahl (16/29)		Attack	Koops (9/20)
Madsen 3		Block	Wiltenburg 2
'Three players' 2		Serve	Meijs (2/9)

=== Belgium vs Finland ===
12 September 2026; 20:00; Match duration: 2hr 14min	Belgium	2–3	Finland	(Finland) Nokia Arena, Tampere; Attendance: 12,338; Referees: Igor Porvaznik (SVK), Ilja Minins (LAT)
12 September 2026; 20:00; Match duration: 2hr 14min	(25–23, 20–25, 19–25, 25–23, 10–15); Report			(Finland) Nokia Arena, Tampere; Attendance: 12,338; Referees: Igor Porvaznik (SVK), Ilja Minins (LAT)
12 September 2026; 20:00; Match duration: 2hr 14min	Scoring leaders			(Finland) Nokia Arena, Tampere; Attendance: 12,338; Referees: Igor Porvaznik (SVK), Ilja Minins (LAT)
Deroo 25		Total	L. Marttila 23
Deroo (23/40)		Attack	Jokela (20/36)
Colson 6		Block	Haapaniemi 3
		Serve	L. Marttila (4/23)

=== Estonia vs Denmark ===
13 September 2026; 17:00; Match duration: 1hr 42min	Estonia	0–3	Denmark	(Finland) Nokia Arena, Tampere; Attendance: 6,467; Referees: Ilja Minins (LAT), Sergej Rodin (LIT)
13 September 2026; 17:00; Match duration: 1hr 42min	(26–28, 22–25, 16–25); Report			(Finland) Nokia Arena, Tampere; Attendance: 6,467; Referees: Ilja Minins (LAT), Sergej Rodin (LIT)
13 September 2026; 17:00; Match duration: 1hr 42min	Scoring leaders			(Finland) Nokia Arena, Tampere; Attendance: 6,467; Referees: Ilja Minins (LAT), Sergej Rodin (LIT)
Tammearu 12		Total	Jensen 19
Tammearu (12/24)		Attack	Jensen (18/24)
'Four players' 1		Block	Uhrenholt 5
Lõhmus, Saaremaa 1		Serve	'Three players' 2

=== Finland vs Serbia ===
13 September 2026; 20:00; Match duration: 1hr 24min	Finland	3–0	Serbia	(Finland) Nokia Arena, Tampere; Attendance: 10,929; Referees: Paul Catalin Szabo-Alexi (ROU), Sébastien Jacob (FRA)
13 September 2026; 20:00; Match duration: 1hr 24min	(25–19, 25–21, 25–23); Report			(Finland) Nokia Arena, Tampere; Attendance: 10,929; Referees: Paul Catalin Szabo-Alexi (ROU), Sébastien Jacob (FRA)
13 September 2026; 20:00; Match duration: 1hr 24min	Scoring leaders			(Finland) Nokia Arena, Tampere; Attendance: 10,929; Referees: Paul Catalin Szabo-Alexi (ROU), Sébastien Jacob (FRA)
Jokela 15		Total	Marinović 14
Jokela (17/24)		Attack	Marinović (11/22)
Savonsalmi 3		Block	Nedeljković 3
N. Marttila (3/10)		Serve	Stefanović (3/16)

=== Serbia vs Netherlands ===
14 September 2026; 17:00; Match duration: 1hr 28min	Serbia	3−2	Netherlands	(Finland) Nokia Arena, Tampere; Attendance: 876; Referees: Sergej Rodin (LIT), Igor Porvaznik (SVK)
14 September 2026; 17:00; Match duration: 1hr 28min	(20−25, 23−25, 30−28, 25−15, 17−15); Report			(Finland) Nokia Arena, Tampere; Attendance: 876; Referees: Sergej Rodin (LIT), Igor Porvaznik (SVK)
14 September 2026; 17:00; Match duration: 1hr 28min	Scoring leaders			(Finland) Nokia Arena, Tampere; Attendance: 876; Referees: Sergej Rodin (LIT), Igor Porvaznik (SVK)
Luburić 38		Total	Meijs 25
Luburić (35/56)		Attack	Meijs (23/49)
Nedeljković 3		Block	Plak 4
Luburić (3/27)		Serve	Koops (2/20)

=== Estonia vs Belgium ===
14 September 2026; 20:00; Match duration: 1hr 48min	Estonia	1−3	Belgium	(Finland) Nokia Arena, Tampere; Attendance: 1,002; Referees: Sébastien Jacob (FRA), Paul Catalin Szabo-Alexi (ROU)
14 September 2026; 20:00; Match duration: 1hr 48min	(17−25, 25−18, 21−25, 14−25); Report			(Finland) Nokia Arena, Tampere; Attendance: 1,002; Referees: Sébastien Jacob (FRA), Paul Catalin Szabo-Alexi (ROU)
14 September 2026; 20:00; Match duration: 1hr 48min	Scoring leaders			(Finland) Nokia Arena, Tampere; Attendance: 1,002; Referees: Sébastien Jacob (FRA), Paul Catalin Szabo-Alexi (ROU)
Jefanov 16		Total	Deroo 22
Jefanov (13/29)		Attack	Deroo (18/32)
'Five players' 1		Block	Colson 6
Jefanov, Tammearu 2		Serve	Deroo, Reggers 2

=== Belgium vs Denmark ===
15 September 2026; 17:00; Match duration: 2hr 08min	Belgium	3−1	Denmark	(Finland) Nokia Arena, Tampere; Attendance: 2,482; Referees: Igor Porvaznik (SVK), Sergej Rodin (LIT)
15 September 2026; 17:00; Match duration: 2hr 08min	(19−25, 25−20, 25−19, 25−23); Report			(Finland) Nokia Arena, Tampere; Attendance: 2,482; Referees: Igor Porvaznik (SVK), Sergej Rodin (LIT)
15 September 2026; 17:00; Match duration: 2hr 08min	Scoring leaders			(Finland) Nokia Arena, Tampere; Attendance: 2,482; Referees: Igor Porvaznik (SVK), Sergej Rodin (LIT)
Reggers 25		Total	Madsen 19
Reggers (19/34)		Attack	Madsen (15/37)
Reggers 6		Block	Mikelsons 7
Deroo 1		Serve	Jensen, Madsen 2

=== Netherlands vs Finland ===
15 September 2026; 20:00; Match duration: 2hr 13min	Netherlands	2–3	Finland	(Finland) Nokia Arena, Tampere; Attendance: 6,106; Referees: Ilja Minins (LAT), Sébastien Jacob (FRA)
15 September 2026; 20:00; Match duration: 2hr 13min	(25–18, 21–25, 26–24, 20–25, 11–15); Report			(Finland) Nokia Arena, Tampere; Attendance: 6,106; Referees: Ilja Minins (LAT), Sébastien Jacob (FRA)
15 September 2026; 20:00; Match duration: 2hr 13min	Scoring leaders			(Finland) Nokia Arena, Tampere; Attendance: 6,106; Referees: Ilja Minins (LAT), Sébastien Jacob (FRA)
Meijs 20		Total	L. Marttila 22
Meijs (17/37)		Attack	L. Marttila (18/38)
Wiltenburg 4		Block	Savonsalmi 5
Koops (2/22)		Serve	L. Marttila, N. Marttila 3

=== Denmark vs Serbia ===
16 September 2026; 17:00; Match duration: 2hr 25min	Denmark	2–3	Serbia	(Finland) Nokia Arena, Tampere; Attendance: 843; Referees: Paul Catalin Szabo-Alexi (ROU), Ilja Minins (LAT)
16 September 2026; 17:00; Match duration: 2hr 25min	(25–19, 25–21, 21–25, 23–25, 14–16); Report			(Finland) Nokia Arena, Tampere; Attendance: 843; Referees: Paul Catalin Szabo-Alexi (ROU), Ilja Minins (LAT)
16 September 2026; 17:00; Match duration: 2hr 25min	Scoring leaders			(Finland) Nokia Arena, Tampere; Attendance: 843; Referees: Paul Catalin Szabo-Alexi (ROU), Ilja Minins (LAT)
Jensen 29		Total	V. Mašulović 34
Jensen (28/46)		Attack	V. Mašulović (29/50)
Mikelsons 3		Block	Nedeljković 4
Madsen (2/22)		Serve	V. Mašulović (3/22)

=== Netherlands vs Estonia ===
16 September 2026; 20:00; Match duration: 2hr 02min	Netherlands	1–3	Estonia	(Finland) Nokia Arena, Tampere; Attendance: 1,023; Referees: Sébastien Jacob (FRA), Igor Porvaznik (SVK)
16 September 2026; 20:00; Match duration: 2hr 02min	(25–27, 22–25, 25–18, 23–25); Report			(Finland) Nokia Arena, Tampere; Attendance: 1,023; Referees: Sébastien Jacob (FRA), Igor Porvaznik (SVK)
16 September 2026; 20:00; Match duration: 2hr 02min	Scoring leaders			(Finland) Nokia Arena, Tampere; Attendance: 1,023; Referees: Sébastien Jacob (FRA), Igor Porvaznik (SVK)
Meijs 19		Total	Tammearu 13
Meijs (15/29)		Attack	Teppan (13/27)
Meijs 3		Block	Saaremaa 3
'Three players' 1		Serve	Lõhmus (4/13)

=== Serbia vs Belgium ===
17 September 2026; 17:00; Match duration: 1hr 13min	Serbia	0–3	Belgium	(Finland) Nokia Arena, Tampere; Attendance: 3,018; Referees: Igor Porvaznik (SVK), Ilja Minins (LAT)
17 September 2026; 17:00; Match duration: 1hr 13min	(19–25, 21–25, 16–25); Report			(Finland) Nokia Arena, Tampere; Attendance: 3,018; Referees: Igor Porvaznik (SVK), Ilja Minins (LAT)
17 September 2026; 17:00; Match duration: 1hr 13min	Scoring leaders			(Finland) Nokia Arena, Tampere; Attendance: 3,018; Referees: Igor Porvaznik (SVK), Ilja Minins (LAT)
Luburić 11		Total	Reggers 16
Luburić (9/14)		Attack	Reggers (13/21)
Jovović 3		Block	Colson, Deroo 2
Luburić (2/7)		Serve	Reggers (3/16)

=== Finland vs Estonia ===
17 September 2026; 20:00; Match duration: 2hr 16min	Finland	2–3	Estonia	(Finland) Nokia Arena, Tampere; Attendance: 9,813; Referees: Sergej Rodin (LIT), Sébastien Jacob (FRA)
17 September 2026; 20:00; Match duration: 2hr 16min	(25–22, 21–25, 22–25, 25–20, 11–15); Report			(Finland) Nokia Arena, Tampere; Attendance: 9,813; Referees: Sergej Rodin (LIT), Sébastien Jacob (FRA)
17 September 2026; 20:00; Match duration: 2hr 16min	Scoring leaders			(Finland) Nokia Arena, Tampere; Attendance: 9,813; Referees: Sergej Rodin (LIT), Sébastien Jacob (FRA)
L. Marttila		Total	Teppan 24
L. Marttila (19/46)		Attack	Teppan (20/33)
Haapaniemi 4		Block	Saaremaa 5
L. Marttila (3/21)		Serve	Saaremaa, Teppan 3
