= Łada Biłgoraj =

Polish football club

- Full name: Łada 1945 Biłgoraj
- Nickname(s): Lwy Lubelszczyzny (The Lions of Lubelszczyzna)
- Founded: 1945; 80 years ago 16 July 2010; 14 years ago (refounded)
- Ground: OSiR Stadium
- Capacity: 1,495
- Chairman: Mirosław Laskowski
- Manager: Paweł Babiarz
- League: IV liga Lublin
- 2023–24: IV liga Lublin, 4th of 18
- Website: http://www.ladabilgoraj.pl/

Łada 1945 Biłgoraj is a Polish football club based in Biłgoraj. Established in 1945, they compete in the IV liga Lublin, the fifth tier of Polish competition.

== Achievements ==
- Round of 64 of Polish Cup: 2003–04
- Participation in III liga: 1988–1989, 1996–1998, 1999–2003
