= Bartłomiej Bołądź =

Polish volleyball player (born 1994)

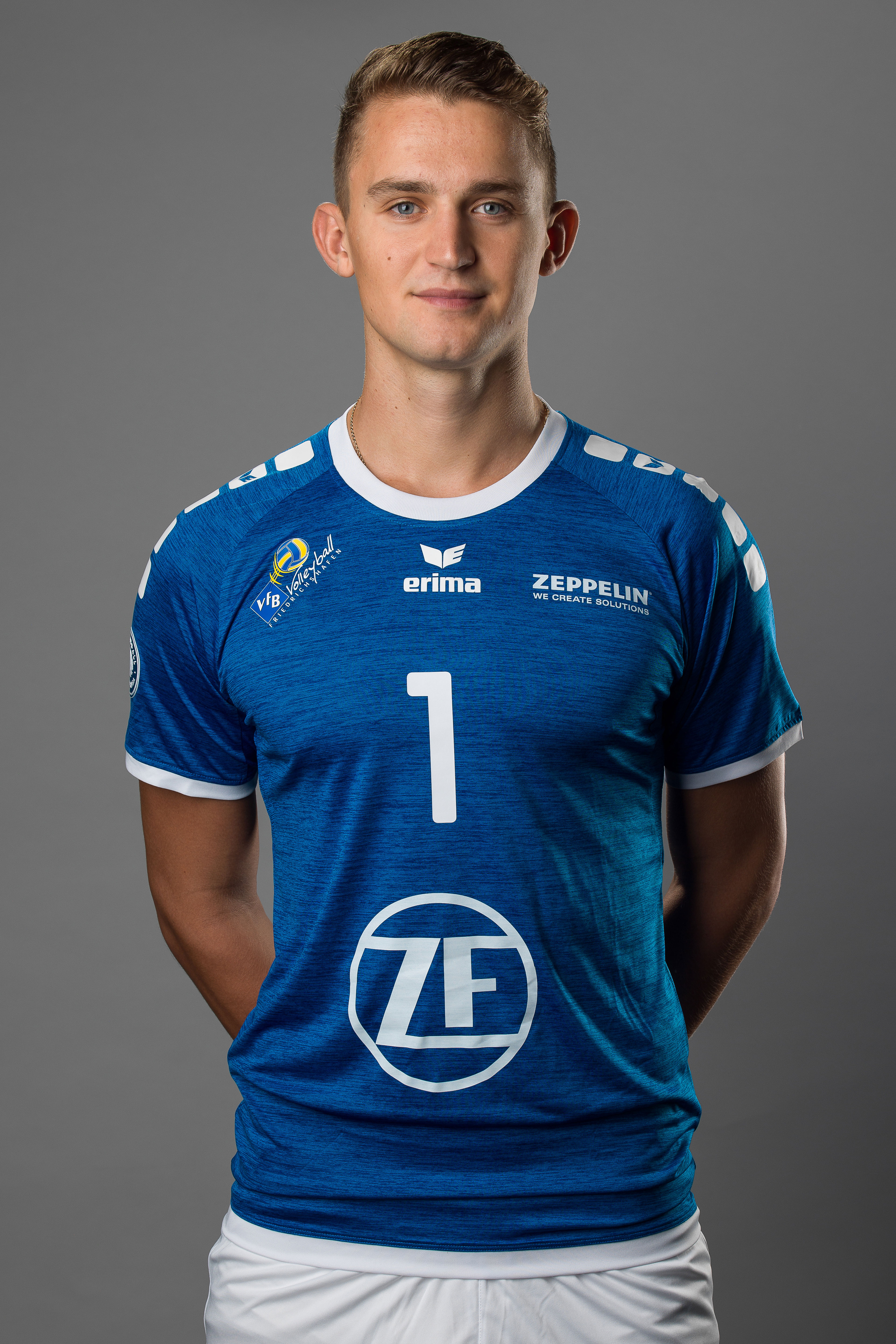
- Bołądź as VfB Friedrichshafen player

Personal information
- Born: 28 September 1994 (age 32); Krzyż Wielkopolski, Poland
- Height: 2.04 m (6 ft 8 in)
- Weight: 102 kg (225 lb)
- Spike: 350 cm (138 in)

Volleyball information
- Position: Opposite
- Current club: Warta Zawiercie
- Number: 9

Career
Years	Teams
2013–2017; 2017–2019; 2019–2022; 2022–2023; 2023–2025; 2025–	Czarni Radom; VfB Friedrichshafen; Ślepsk Suwałki; Trefl Gdańsk; Projekt Warsaw; Warta Zawiercie

National team
2015–	Poland
Honours
Men's volleyball
Representing Poland
Olympic Games
Silver medal – second place	2024 Paris	Team
FIVB Nations League
Gold medal – first place	2025 Ningbo
Gold medal – first place	2026 Ningbo
Bronze medal – third place	2019 Chicago
Bronze medal – third place	2024 Łódź
CEV European Championship
Gold medal – first place	2026 Bulgaria/Finland/Italy/Romania
European League
Bronze medal – third place	2015 Poland

Bartłomiej Bołądź (born 28 September 1994) is a Polish professional volleyball player who plays as an opposite spiker for Aluron CMC Warta Zawiercie and the Poland national team.

== Career ==
After graduating from SMS PZPS Spała, he signed a three-year contract with Cerrad Czarni Radom. He spent four seasons playing for Czarni Radom, before moving to VfB Friedrichshafen in July 2017.

He competed in the men's tournament at the 2024 Summer Olympics as an alternate player, replacing the injured Mateusz Bieniek and making his debut against the USA. On 10 August 2024, he won a silver medal after a lost match against France in the final.

== Honours ==
=== Club ===
- CEV Champions League
  - 2025–26 – with Aluron CMC Warta Zawiercie
- CEV Challenge Cup
  - 2023–24 – with Projekt Warsaw
- Domestic
  - 2017–18 German SuperCup, with VfB Friedrichshafen
  - 2017–18 German Cup, with VfB Friedrichshafen
  - 2018–19 German SuperCup, with VfB Friedrichshafen
  - 2018–19 German Cup, with VfB Friedrichshafen
  - 2025–26 Polish Championship, with Aluron CMC Warta Zawiercie

=== State awards ===
- 2024: Knight's Cross of Polonia Restituta
