= Lourenço Martins =

Portuguese volleyball player (born 1997)

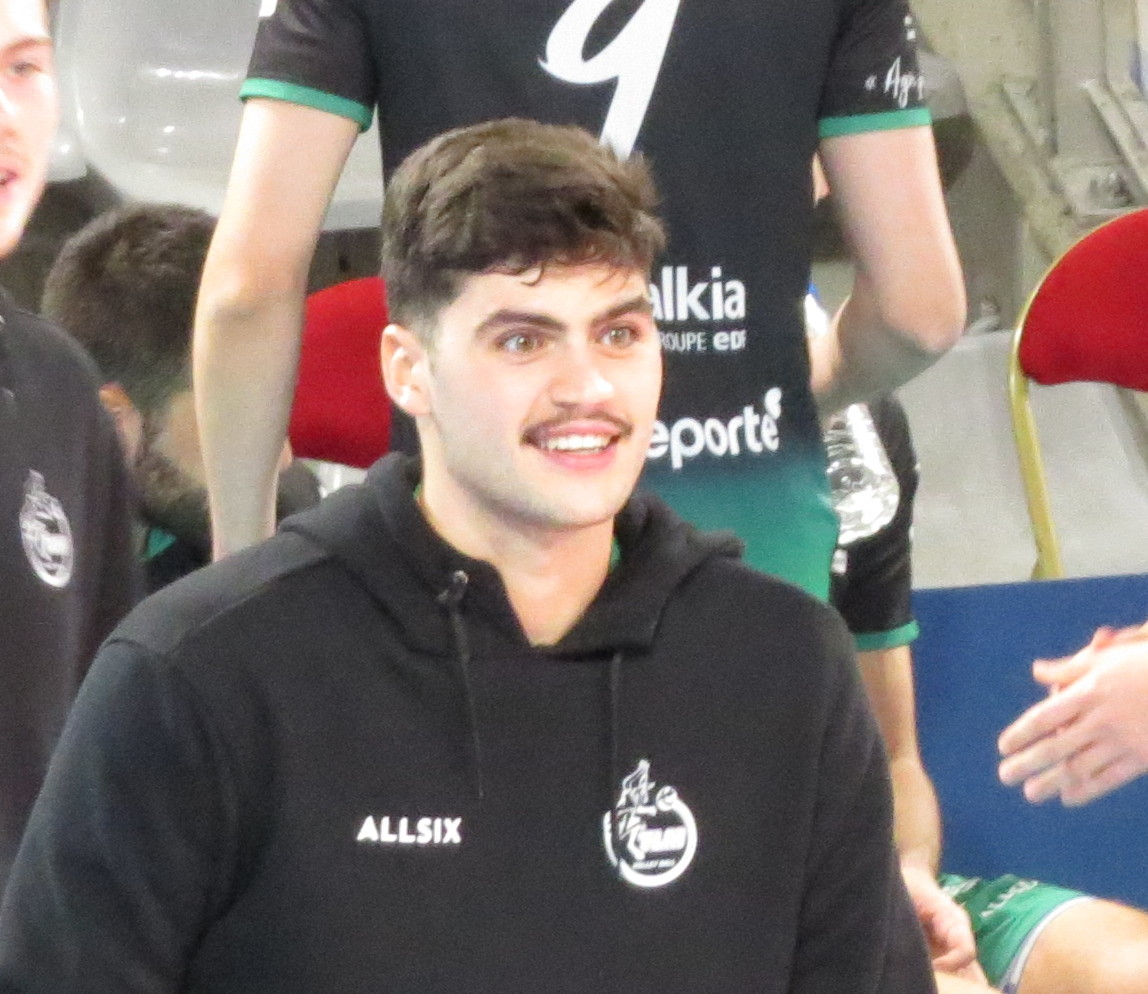
- Lourenço Martins in 2020.

Personal information
- Nationality: Portuguese
- Born: 30 April 1997 (age 29)
- Height: 200 cm (6 ft 7 in)
- Weight: 78 kg (172 lb)
- Spike: 308 cm (121 in)
- Block: 298 cm (117 in)

Volleyball information
- Current club: Sporting Clube de Portugal
- Number: 12 (national team)

Career
Years	Teams
2015	Castelo da Maia

National team
2015	Portugal

Lourenço Martins (born 30 April 1997) is a Portuguese male volleyball player. He is part of the Portugal men's national volleyball team. On club level he plays for Sporting CP.
