= Alexandre Ferreira (volleyball) =

Portuguese volleyball player (born 1991)

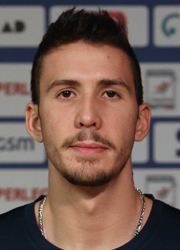
- Ferreira in 2016

Personal information
- Nickname: Alex
- Born: 13 November 1991 (age 34); Seia, Portugal
- Height: 2.02 m (6 ft 8 in)
- Weight: 87 kg (192 lb)
- Spike: 361 cm (142 in)
- Block: 346 cm (136 in)

Volleyball information
- Position: Outside hitter
- Current club: Tokyo Great Bears

Career
Years	Teams
2009–2011; 2011–2012; 2012–2013; 2013–2014; 2014–2016; 2016–2017; 2017–2018; 2018–2020; 2020–2022; 2022–2023; 2023–2024; 2024–	Esmoriz GC; SC Espinho; New Mater Volley; Trentino Volley; Ziraat Bankası Ankara; Calzedonia Verona; KB Insurance Stars; Warta Zawiercie; Seoul Woori Card Woori Won; Fenerbahçe; LUK Lublin; Tokyo Great Bears

National team
2011–	Portugal
Honours
Men's volleyball
Representing Portugal
FIVB Challenger Cup
Gold medal – first place	2018 Matosinhos

Alexandre Ferreira (born 13 November 1991) is a Portuguese professional volleyball player who plays as an outside hitter for Tokyo Great Bears and the Portugal national team.

His brother, Marco is also a professional volleyball player.

== Honours ==
=== Club ===
- Domestic
  - 2011–12 Portuguese Championship, with SC Espinho
  - 2013–14 Italian SuperCup, with Diatec Trentino

=== Individual awards ===
- 2018: FIVB Challenger Cup – Best server
- 2018: FIVB Challenger Cup – Best spiker
