= Filip Cveticanin =

Portuguese volleyball player (born 1996)

Personal information
- Nationality: Portuguese
- Born: 19 June 1996 (age 30); Funchal, Portugal
- Height: 201 cm (6 ft 7 in)
- Weight: 90 kg (198 lb)
- Spike: 360 cm (142 in)
- Block: 330 cm (130 in)

Career
Years	Teams
2015–2017; 2017–2019	Castelo da Maia GC; Benfica

National team
2015–	Portugal

Filip Cveticanin (Serbian Cyrillic: Филип Цветићанин; born 19 June 1996) is a Portuguese male volleyball player for the Portugal national team. His parents, both with sporting background, moved from Serbia to Portugal in 1994. He started to play volleyball at the age of 14 for GDC Gueifães and later signed for Castêlo da Maia GC, before joining Benfica in 2017. 201 cm high, he plays as middle blocker.

After participating in the Portugal national junior team, Cveticanin made a debut for the senior national team at 2015 FIVB Volleyball World League, and has played since in the 2016 World League and qualifying games for the 2017 European Championships.

== Honours ==
Benfica

- Portuguese First Division: 2018–19
- Portuguese Cup: 2018–19
