= Volleyball at the 2015 Pan American Games =

- Volleyball pictogram for the games
- Venue: Exhibition Centre – Hall A
- Dates: July 16–26
- No. of events: 2 (1 men, 1 women)
- Competitors: 192 from 10 nations

Volleyball competitions at the 2015 Pan American Games in Toronto was held from July 16 to 26 at the Direct Energy Centre (Exhibition Centre). Due to naming rights the arena was known as the latter for the duration of the games. A total of eight men's and women's teams competed in each respective tournament. The tournament was affected by the FIVB Volleyball World Grand Prix and the FIVB Volleyball World League which were played at same time.

== Competition schedule ==
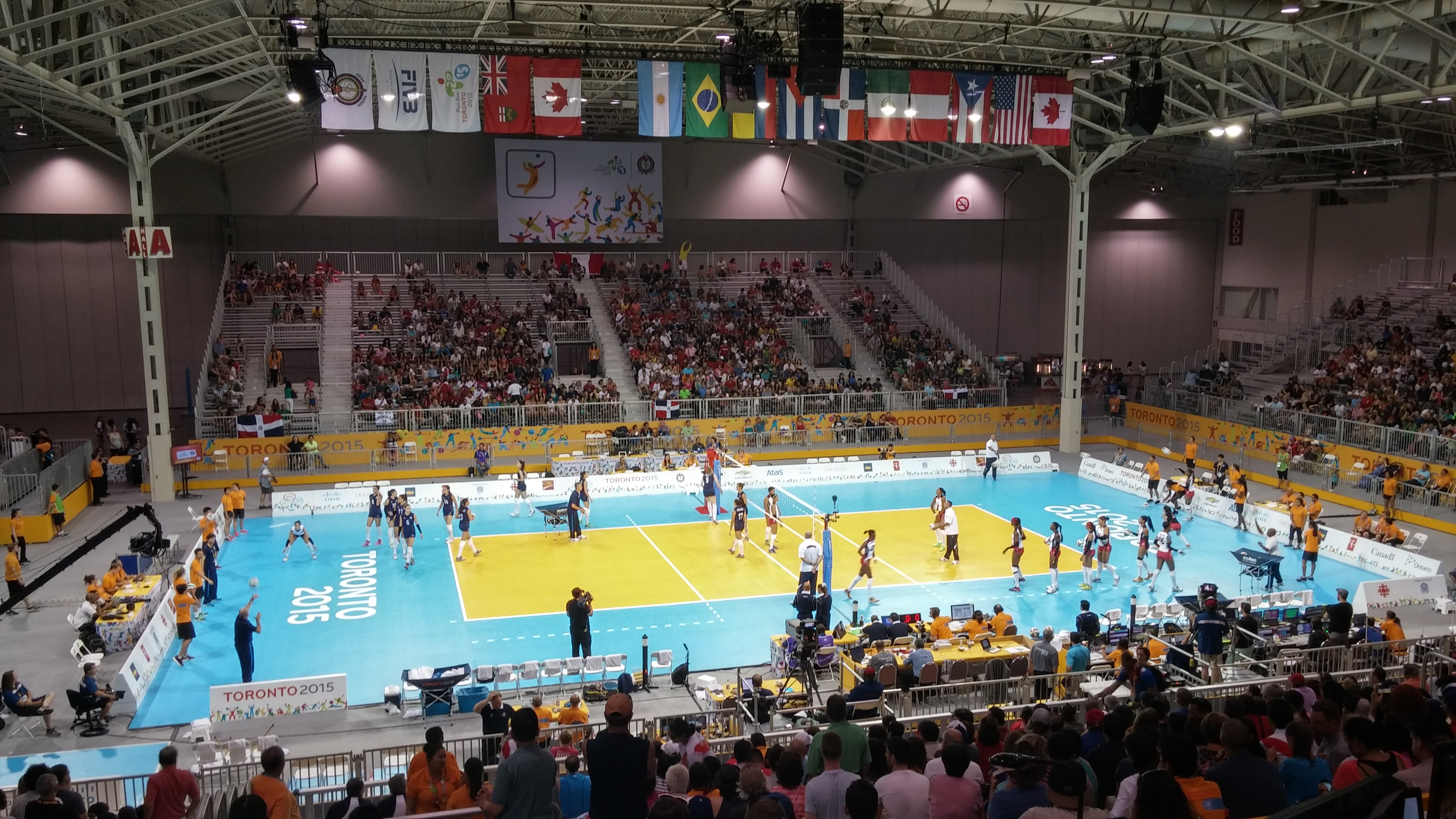
The Direct Energy Centre (Exhibition Centre) Hall A, was the venue for the volleyball competitions

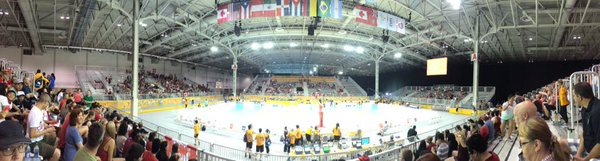
The Direct Energy Centre (Exhibition Centre) Hall A, was the venue for the volleyball competitions

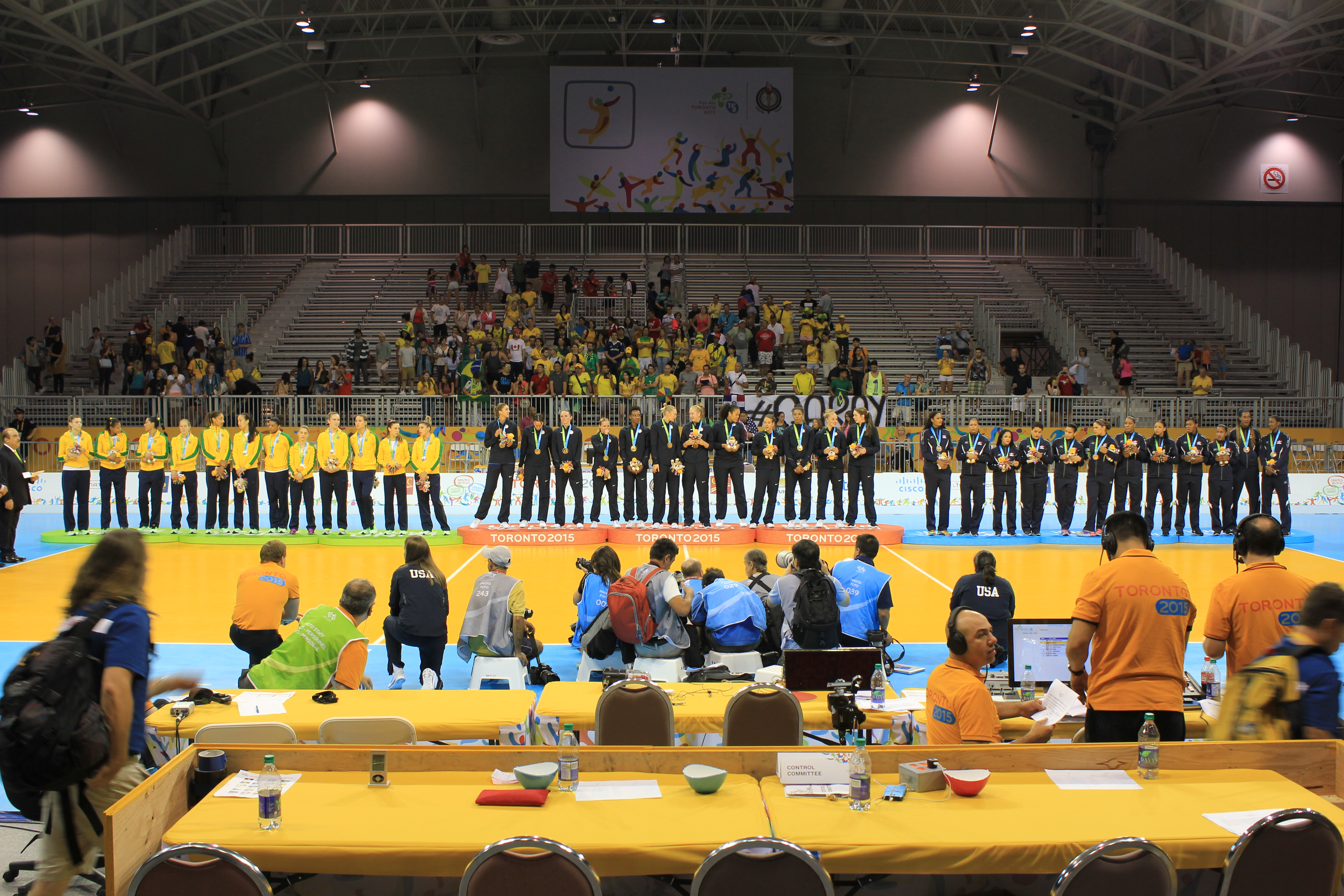
Medal Award Ceremony, United States women's national team (gold), Brazil (silver), and Dominican Republic (bronze)

The following is the competition schedule for the volleyball competitions:

| P | Preliminaries | ¼ | Quarterfinals | ½ | Semifinals | B | 3rd place play-off | F | Final |

| Event↓/Date → | Thu 16 | Fri 17 | Sat 18 | Sun 19 | Mon 20 | Tue 21 | Wed 22 | Thu 23 | Fri 24 | Sat 25 | | Sun 26 | |
|---|---|---|---|---|---|---|---|---|---|---|---|---|---|
| Men | | P | | P | | P | ¼ | | ½ | | | B | F |
| Women | P | | P | | P | | ¼ | ½ | | B | F | | |

== Medal table ==
* Host nation (Canada)

| Rank | Nation | Gold | Silver | Bronze | Total |
|---|---|---|---|---|---|
| 1 | Argentina | 1 | 0 | 0 | 1 |
| 1 | United States | 1 | 0 | 0 | 1 |
| 3 | Brazil | 0 | 2 | 0 | 2 |
| 4 | Canada* | 0 | 0 | 1 | 1 |
| 4 | Dominican Republic | 0 | 0 | 1 | 1 |
| Totals (5 entries) | | 2 | 2 | 2 | 6 |

== Medalists ==
| Event | Gold | Silver | Bronze |
|---|---|---|---|
| Men's tournament | Argentina; Sebastian Closter; Facundo Conte; Pablo Crer; Luciano de Cecco; Javier Filardi; Maximiliano Gauna; Jose Gonzalez; Rodrigo Quiroga; Martin Ramos; Sebastian Sole; Nicolas Uriarte; Luciano Zornetta | Brazil; Carlos Eduardo Silva; Douglas Souza; Flávio Gualberto; João Rafael Ferreira; Maurício Borges Silva; Maurício Souza; Murilo Radke; Otávio Pinto; Rafael Araújo; Renan Buiatti; Thiago Veloso; Tiago Brendle | Canada; Nicholas Hoag; Dan Lewis; Steven Marshall; John Gordon Perrin; TJ Sanders; Gavin Schmitt; Dustin Schneider; Adam Simac; Toontje van Lankvelt; Rudy Verhoeff; Graham Vigrass; Fred Winters |
| Women's tournament | United States; Lauren Paolini; Cassidy Lichtman; Kristin Hildebrand; Natalie Hagglund; Nicole Fawcett; Cursty Jackson; Michelle Bartsch; Falyn Fonoimoana; Jenna Hagglund; Rachael Adams; Carli Lloyd; Krista Vansant | Brazil; Adenízia da Silva; Ana Tiemi; Angélica Malinverno; Bárbara Brunch; Camila Brait; Fernanda Garay; Jaqueline Carvalho; Joyce da Silva; Macris Carneiro; Mariana Costa; Michelle Pavão; Rosamaria Montibeller | Dominican Republic; Annerys Vargas; Marianne Fersola; Brenda Castillo; Camil Domínguez; Niverka Marte; Prisilla Rivera; Yonkaira Peña; Gina Mambru; Bethania de la Cruz; Ana Binet; Brayelin Martínez; Jineiry Martínez |

== Qualification ==
A total of eight men's teams and eight women's team will qualify to compete at the games. The top three teams in the FIVB World Rankings from South America as of December 31, 2014 along with the top four from North, Central America and The Caribbean will qualify for each respective tournament. The host nation (Canada) automatically qualifies teams in both events. Each nation may enter one team in each tournament (12 athletes per team) for a maximum total of 24 athletes.

=== Men ===
| Criteria | Vacancies | Qualified |
|---|---|---|
| Host Nation | 1 | Canada |
| North, Central American and Caribbean ranking | 4 | United States; Cuba; Puerto Rico; Mexico |
| South American Ranking | 3 | Brazil; Argentina; Colombia |
| Total | 8 | |

=== Women ===
| Criteria | Vacancies | Qualified |
|---|---|---|
| Host Nation | 1 | Canada |
| North, Central American and Caribbean ranking | 4 | United States; Dominican Republic; Puerto Rico; Cuba |
| South American Ranking | 3 | Brazil; Argentina; Peru |
| Total | 8 | |

== Participating nations ==
A total of ten countries qualified volleyball teams. The numbers in parentheses represents the number of participants qualified.

- Argentina (24)
- Brazil (24)
- Canada (24)
- Colombia (12)
- Cuba (24)
- Dominican Republic (12)
- Mexico (12)
- Peru (12)
- Puerto Rico (24)
- United States (24)

== See also ==
- Volleyball at the 2016 Summer Olympics
