= Volleyball at the 2015 Pan American Games – Men's volleyball team squads =

This article shows the rosters of all participating teams at the men's Volleyball tournament at the 2015 Pan American Games in Toronto. Rosters can have a maximum of 12 athletes.

== Argentina ==
The Argentina indoor volleyball men's team consists of the following players:

- Sebastian Closter
- Facundo Conte
- Pablo Crer
- Luciano de Cecco
- Javier Filardi
- Maximiliano Gauna
- Jose Gonzalez
- Rodrigo Quiroga
- Martin Ramos
- Sebastian Sole
- Nicolas Uriarte
- Luciano Zornetta

== Brazil ==
Brazil announced their squad on June 30, 2015.

- Carlos Eduardo Silva
- Douglas Souza
- Flávio Gualberto
- João Rafael Ferreira
- Maurício Borges Silva
- Maurício Souza
- Murilo Radke
- Otávio Pinto
- Rafael Araújo
- Renan Buiatti
- Thiago Veloso
- Tiago Brendle

== Canada ==
Canada announced their squad on June, 18 2015.

- Nicholas Hoag
- Dan Lewis
- Steven Marshall
- John Gordon Perrin
- TJ Sanders
- Gavin Schmitt
- Dustin Schneider
- Adam Simac
- Toontje van Lankvelt
- Rudy Verhoeff
- Graham Vigrass
- Fred Winters

== United States ==
- Taylor Averill
- Michael Brinkley
- Cody Caldwell
- Brian Cook
- Torey Defalco
- Kristopher Johnson
- Conrad Kaminski
- Zachary La Cavera
- Andrew Nally
- Benjamin Patch
- Jonah Seif
- Matthew West
