= 2015 Men's NORCECA Volleyball Champions Cup =

2015 Men's NORCECA Champions Cup
Tournament details
- Host country: United States
- City: Detroit
- Dates: 21–23 May
- Teams: 4 (from 1 confederation)
- Venue: 1 (in 1 host city)

Final positions
- Champions: Canada (1st title)
- Runners-up: United States
- Third place: Cuba
- Fourth place: Mexico

Tournament awards
- MVP: (Canada) Daniel Lewis

Tournament statistics
- Matches played: 6

The 2015 Men's NORCECA Volleyball Champions Cup was the first edition of the tournament, and was held in Detroit, United States from 21 to 23 May 2015. The top two teams qualified for the 2015 FIVB Volleyball Men's World Cup. Canada won the tournament for the first time in its history.

== Qualification ==
The hosts United States and the top three ranked teams from the NORCECA Ranking as of 1 January 2015 which had not yet qualified to the 2015 World Cup. Rankings are shown in brackets except the hosts who ranked 1st.

- United States (Hosts)
- Cuba (2)
- Canada (3)
- Mexico (4)

== Venue ==
All matches
Detroit, United States
Joe Louis Arena
Capacity: 20,027
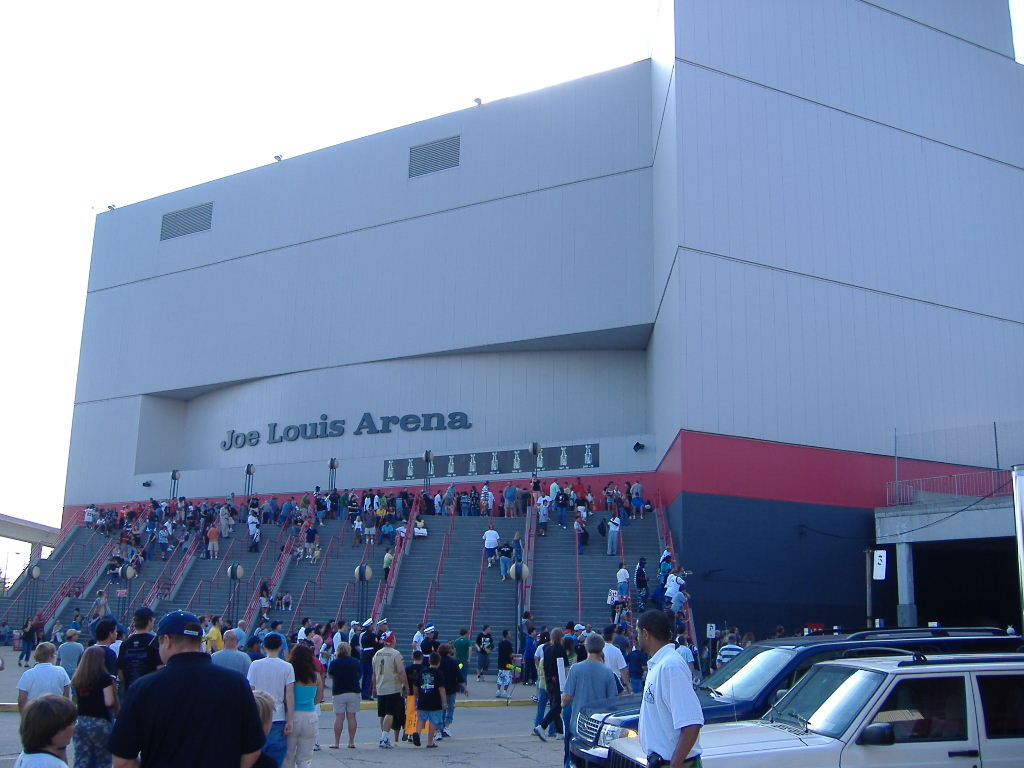

== Pool standing procedure ==
1. Number of matches won
2. Match points
3. Points ratio
4. Sets ratio
5. Result of the last match between the tied teams

Match won 3–0: 5 match points for the winner, 0 match points for the loser
Match won 3–1: 4 match points for the winner, 1 match point for the loser
Match won 3–2: 3 match points for the winner, 2 match points for the loser

== Round robin ==
- All times are Eastern Daylight Time (UTC−04:00).

Pos	Team	Pld	W	L	Pts	SPW	SPL	SPR	SW	SL	SR
1	Canada	3	3	0	13	257	210	1.224	9	2	4.500
2	United States	3	2	1	11	278	217	1.281	8	4	2.000
3	Cuba	3	1	2	6	198	224	0.884	4	6	0.667
4	Mexico	3	0	3	0	143	225	0.636	0	9	0.000

Date	Time		Score		Set 1	Set 2	Set 3	Set 4	Set 5	Total	Report
21 May	16:00	Canada	3–0	Cuba	25–22	25–18	25–17			75–57	P2 P3
21 May	18:00	United States	3–0	Mexico	25–15	25–12	25–17			75–44	P2 P3
22 May	16:00	Mexico	0–3	Canada	12–25	20–25	13–25			45–75	P2 P3
22 May	18:00	United States	3–1	Cuba	20–25	25–17	25–10	25–14		95–66	P2 P3
23 May	16:00	Cuba	3–0	Mexico	25–17	25–22	25–15			75–54	P2 P3
23 May	18:00	United States	2–3	Canada	22–25	25–19	25–21	21–25	15–17	108–107	P2 P3

== Final standing ==
Rank	Team
1st place, gold medalist(s)	Canada
2nd place, silver medalist(s)	United States
3rd place, bronze medalist(s)	Cuba
4	Mexico

Qualified for the 2015 World Cup

2015 NORCECA Men's Champions Cup champions

Canada
1st title

14–man Roster
Sanders, Perrin, Lewis, Howatson, Verhoeff, Duff, Simac, Schneider, Van Lankvelt, Schmitt, Winters (c), Vigrass, N. Hoag, Marshall
Head coach
G. Hoag

== Awards ==
- Most Valuable Player

(Canada) Daniel Lewis

== See also ==
- 2015 NORCECA Women's Champions Cup (Final Four)
