= 2015 FIVB Volleyball Men's World Cup =

2015 Men's World Cup
Tournament details
- Host country: Japan
- Dates: 8–23 September
- Teams: 12 (from 5 confederations)
- Venue: 6 (in 5 host cities)

Final positions
- Champions: United States (2nd title)
- Runners-up: Italy
- Third place: Poland
- Fourth place: Russia

Tournament awards
- MVP: (United States) Matt Anderson
- Best Setter: (United States) Micah Christenson
- Best OH: (Italy) Osmany Juantorena (Japan) Yūki Ishikawa
- Best MB: (Argentina) Sebastián Sole (Iran) Mohammad Mousavi
- Best OPP: (Italy) Ivan Zaytsev
- Best Libero: (United States) Erik Shoji

The 2015 FIVB Men's World Cup was held from 8 to 23 September 2015 in Japan. The tournament served as a qualification process for the 2016 Summer Olympics in Rio de Janeiro, Brazil. The top two teams, USA and Italy, qualified for the Olympics, and joined Brazil as they had already secured a berth as the host country.

United States secured the country's second title with 10 victories and only 1 loss. Matt Anderson was elected the Most Valuable Player. Moreover, there were 3 record breakings. Firstly, Thomas Edgar broke the highest score points in a single match record in Australia's win over Egypt with 50 points. Secondly, in Canada's win over Australia in five sets (32–34, 25–14, 25–21, 27–29, 20–18), two tournament records were broken: the longest match (2 hours and 49 minutes) and the highest scoring game (245 points).

== Information ==
The FIVB Volleyball World Cup began with signing a contract between Fédération Internationale de Volleyball (FIVB) and Japan Volleyball Association (JVA) for hosting the tournament on 31 January 2013. In this event, Fuji TV had the right to broadcast the tournament. Moreover, the FIVB released the qualification process of the tournament:

1. Host country
2. 2014 World champions
3. 2 teams per continental confederation considered by World ranking, continental ranking, or continental championship

But, on 10 March 2015, the FIVB announced a change of the continental events following each continental confederation's agreement.

1. AVC used the World ranking as of 1 January 2015.
2. CAVB used the African Championship.
3. CEV used the European ranking as of 1 January 2015.
4. CSV held a qualification tournament.
5. NORCECA used the 2015 NORCECA Champions Cup.

=== Changes ===
1. Olympics places
  Only the winners and runners-up of the competition could secure the berths in the 2016 Summer Olympics. It was different from last edition which three medalists teams joined the Olympics.
2. Qualification format
  The 2015 World Cup changed the format of the competition following the information above. There were not 2 wild card teams like 2011 edition. One of these spots belonged to the World champions, the other one belonged to the 2nd place of a continental event (2011 edition gave tickets to 4 of 5 continents, but 2015 edition gave tickets to all 5 continents).
3. Competition format
  Competition rounds decreased from 4 in 2011 to 3. Combining rounds 1 (3 days) and 2 (2 days) in 2011 to 1 round of 5 days. The hosts also reduced the venues from 8 to 6.
4. Pool standing procedure
  In 2011 edition, match points was the first criterion, but 2015 changed it to number of matches won. All criteria are shown in section Pool standing procedure.
5. Net touch
  In this edition, players can not touch the whole net and antennas, not just the white band like in 2011 edition.
6. Roster
  All 14 players (maximum 12 regular players and maximum 2 liberos) can play in every match and be named in score sheets.
7. Individual awards
  Individual awards were given to players by positions, unlike previous editions when awards were given to players by volleyball skills.
8. Attribution of points
  FIVB approved the proposal that in case the team hosting the Summer Olympics participated in a previous World Cup then they would keep the World Ranking points gained at the previous World Cup.
9. Referee
  It was the first time in the competition when there was a challenge referee. In each match, there was a referee who controlled the challenge system.

== Qualification ==
12 teams participated in the World Cup. Only teams who had not yet qualified for the 2016 Summer Olympics could compete in the tournament.

Means of qualification	Date	Venue	Qualified
Host country	31 January 2013	(Switzerland) Lausanne	Japan
2014 World Championship	30 Aug – 21 Sep 2014	Poland	Poland
World Ranking for Asian Team	22 September 2014	(Thailand) Bangkok	Iran
World Ranking for Asian Team	22 September 2014	(Thailand) Bangkok	Australia
European Ranking	15 October 2014	Luxembourg	Russia
European Ranking	15 October 2014	Luxembourg	Italy
South American Qualifier	19–23 May 2015	(Colombia) Cali	Argentina
South American Qualifier	19–23 May 2015	(Colombia) Cali	Venezuela
2015 NORCECA Champions Cup	21–23 May 2015	(United States) Detroit	Canada
2015 NORCECA Champions Cup	21–23 May 2015	(United States) Detroit	United States
2015 African Championship	22–30 July 2015	(Egypt) Cairo	Egypt
2015 African Championship	22–30 July 2015	(Egypt) Cairo	Tunisia
Total			12

== Squads ==
Maximum of 12 regular players and maximum of 2 liberos can be selected to play in the tournament. The rosters of 14 players of each team can be seen in the article below.

== Venues ==
Site	First round	Second round	Third round	2015 FIVB Volleyball Men's World Cup is located in Japan
A	Hiroshima	Osaka	Tokyo	2015 FIVB Volleyball Men's World Cup is located in Japan
A	Hiroshima Prefectural Sports Center	Osaka Municipal Central Gymnasium	Yoyogi National Gymnasium	2015 FIVB Volleyball Men's World Cup is located in Japan
A	Capacity: 4,750	Capacity: 7,000	Capacity: 13,291	2015 FIVB Volleyball Men's World Cup is located in Japan
B	Hamamatsu	Toyama	Tokyo	2015 FIVB Volleyball Men's World Cup is located in Japan
B	Hamamatsu Arena	Toyama City Gymnasium	Tokyo Metropolitan Gymnasium	2015 FIVB Volleyball Men's World Cup is located in Japan
B	Capacity: 8,000	Capacity: 5,000	Capacity: 10,000	2015 FIVB Volleyball Men's World Cup is located in Japan

== Format ==
The competition system of the 2015 World Cup for men was the single Round-Robin system. Each team played once against each of the 11 remaining teams.

The teams were divided into 2 pools of 6 teams each. In round 1, total 30 matches in 5 days, each teams played against the other teams from the same pool. For rounds 2 and 3, total 36 matches in 6 days, each team played against the teams from another pool.

The pools composition followed the Serpentine system based on the FIVB World Ranking where the host team was at the top position. There were no teams from CAVB on the drawing of lots day, the teams from CAVB were at the bottom position of pool composition. Numbers in brackets denoted the FIVB World Ranking as of 22 September 2014 except the hosts who ranked 21st.

Pool A	Pool B
Japan (Hosts)	Russia (2)
Italy (4)	Poland (3)
United States (5)	Argentina (6)
Australia (13)	Iran (10)
Canada (14)	Venezuela (29)
Egypt (19)	Tunisia (15)

== Pool standing procedure ==
1. Match points
2. Number of matches won
3. Sets ratio
4. Points ratio
5. Result of the last match between the tied teams

Match won 3–0 or 3–1: 3 match points for the winner, 0 match points for the loser
Match won 3–2: 2 match points for the winner, 1 match point for the loser

== Results ==
Pos	Team	Pld	W	L	Pts	SW	SL	SR	SPW	SPL	SPR
1	United States	11	10	1	30	31	6	5.167	899	746	1.205
2	Italy	11	10	1	29	30	8	3.750	918	780	1.177
3	Poland	11	10	1	29	31	11	2.818	1011	884	1.144
4	Russia	11	8	3	23	25	12	2.083	885	794	1.115
5	Argentina	11	7	4	21	26	16	1.625	985	922	1.068
6	Japan	11	5	6	16	21	21	1.000	928	934	0.994
7	Canada	11	5	6	13	18	22	0.818	886	940	0.943
8	Iran	11	4	7	12	16	24	0.667	905	893	1.013
9	Australia	11	4	7	12	15	24	0.625	831	925	0.898
10	Egypt	11	2	9	8	13	30	0.433	889	976	0.911
11	Venezuela	11	1	10	3	8	32	0.250	815	981	0.831
12	Tunisia	11	0	11	2	5	33	0.152	747	924	0.808

All times are Japan Standard Time (UTC+09:00).

=== First round ===
==== Site A ====
Date	Time		Score		Set 1	Set 2	Set 3	Set 4	Set 5	Total	Report
8 Sep	12:10	Canada	1–3	Italy	19–25	20–25	25–22	13–25		77–97	P2 P3
8 Sep	15:10	United States	3–0	Australia	25–23	25–12	25–15			75–50	P2 P3
8 Sep	19:20	Japan	3–2	Egypt	25–19	23–25	25–18	17–25	15–7	105–94	P2 P3
9 Sep	12:10	Australia	0–3	Italy	17–25	18–25	15–25			50–75	P2 P3
9 Sep	15:10	Egypt	2–3	Canada	22–25	23–25	25–21	26–24	12–15	108–110	P2 P3
9 Sep	19:20	United States	3–1	Japan	25–23	21–25	25–11	25–14		96–73	P2 P3
10 Sep	12:10	Italy	3–1	Egypt	20–25	26–24	25–22	25–13		96–84	P2 P3
10 Sep	15:10	Canada	0–3	United States	21–25	20–25	17–25			58–75	P2 P3
10 Sep	19:20	Japan	3–1	Australia	25–17	25–21	25–27	25–18		100–83	P2 P3
12 Sep	12:10	United States	3–0	Italy	25–18	25–23	29–27			79–68	P2 P3
12 Sep	15:10	Australia	3–2	Egypt	23–25	26–24	25–23	20–25	15–13	109–110	P2 P3
12 Sep	19:20	Japan	3–0	Canada	25–17	25–15	25–21			75–53	P2 P3
13 Sep	12:10	Egypt	0–3	United States	20–25	13–25	21–25			54–75	P2 P3
13 Sep	15:10	Canada	3–2	Australia	32–34	25–14	25–21	27–29	20–18	129–116	P2 P3
13 Sep	19:20	Italy	3–0	Japan	25–21	25–20	25–15			75–56	P2 P3

==== Site B ====
Date	Time		Score		Set 1	Set 2	Set 3	Set 4	Set 5	Total	Report
8 Sep	12:10	Argentina	3–1	Iran	25–27	25–22	25–22	26–24		101–95	P2 P3
8 Sep	15:10	Russia	3–0	Venezuela	29–27	25–16	25–15			79–58	P2 P3
8 Sep	18:40	Poland	3–0	Tunisia	25–17	25–15	25–20			75–52	P2 P3
9 Sep	12:10	Argentina	3–2	Venezuela	30–32	25–15	24–26	25–13	15–10	119–96	P2 P3
9 Sep	15:20	Tunisia	1–3	Iran	17–25	25–21	14–25	20–25		76–96	P2 P3
9 Sep	18:40	Poland	3–1	Russia	26–28	27–25	25–19	25–22		103–94	P2 P3
10 Sep	12:10	Iran	3–0	Venezuela	25–20	25–17	25–15			75–52	P2 P3
10 Sep	15:10	Argentina	1–3	Poland	18–25	25–19	21–25	25–27		89–96	P2 P3
10 Sep	18:40	Russia	3–0	Tunisia	25–17	25–16	29–27			79–60	P2 P3
12 Sep	12:10	Poland	3–2	Iran	18–25	23–25	25–15	25–20	15–11	106–96	P2 P3
12 Sep	15:10	Tunisia	2–3	Venezuela	25–19	18–25	25–22	26–28	13–15	107–109	P2 P3
12 Sep	18:40	Russia	3–1	Argentina	25–19	21–25	25–18	25–20		96–82	P2 P3
13 Sep	12:10	Venezuela	1–3	Poland	27–25	23–25	16–25	23–25		89–100	P2 P3
13 Sep	15:10	Argentina	3–0	Tunisia	25–20	25–19	25–20			75–59	P2 P3
13 Sep	18:40	Iran	0–3	Russia	24–26	18–25	20–25			62–76	P2 P3

=== Second round ===
==== Site A ====
Date	Time		Score		Set 1	Set 2	Set 3	Set 4	Set 5	Total	Report
16 Sep	12:10	United States	3–0	Venezuela	25–18	25–16	25–20			75–54	P2 P3
16 Sep	15:10	Italy	3–0	Iran	25–19	25–23	25–21			75–63	P2 P3
16 Sep	19:20	Japan	3–0	Tunisia	25–21	25–19	25–19			75–59	P2 P3
17 Sep	12:10	United States	3–1	Iran	20–25	25–19	25–22	25–21		95–87	P2 P3
17 Sep	15:10	Italy	3–0	Tunisia	25–18	25–23	25–22			75–63	P2 P3
17 Sep	19:20	Japan	3–0	Venezuela	33–31	26–24	25–19			84–74	P2 P3
18 Sep	12:10	United States	3–0	Tunisia	25–14	25–19	29–27			79–60	P2 P3
18 Sep	15:10	Italy	3–0	Venezuela	25–16	25–22	25–18			75–56	P2 P3
18 Sep	19:20	Japan	2–3	Iran	25–22	25–23	18–25	21–25	12–15	101–110	P2 P3

==== Site B ====
Date	Time		Score		Set 1	Set 2	Set 3	Set 4	Set 5	Total	Report
16 Sep	12:10	Egypt	0–3	Argentina	18–25	19–25	21–25			58–75	P2 P3
16 Sep	15:10	Canada	1–3	Poland	25–23	15–25	19–25	19–25		78–98	P2 P3
16 Sep	19:10	Australia	0–3	Russia	24–26	16–25	18–25			58–76	P2 P3
17 Sep	12:10	Egypt	0–3	Poland	20–25	23–25	18–25			61–75	P2 P3
17 Sep	15:10	Canada	0–3	Russia	21–25	16–25	19–25			56–75	P2 P3
17 Sep	19:10	Australia	0–3	Argentina	21–25	23–25	16–25			60–75	P2 P3
18 Sep	12:10	Egypt	0–3	Russia	20–25	24–26	18–25			62–76	P2 P3
18 Sep	15:10	Argentina	3–1	Canada	25–21	23–25	29–27	25–22		102–95	P2 P3
18 Sep	19:10	Australia	0–3	Poland	15–25	22–25	17–25			54–75	P2 P3

=== Third round ===
==== Site A ====
Date	Time		Score		Set 1	Set 2	Set 3	Set 4	Set 5	Total	Report
21 Sep	10:30	Italy	3–0	Russia	25–15	26–24	25–18			76–57	P2 P3
21 Sep	14:15	Japan	0–3	Argentina	24–26	22–25	21–25			67–76	P2 P3
21 Sep	17:10	United States	1–3	Poland	25–17	19–25	23–25	15–25		82–92	P2 P3
22 Sep	10:30	Italy	3–2	Argentina	22–25	25–20	25–21	20–25	16–14	108–105	P2 P3
22 Sep	14:15	Japan	1–3	Poland	26–24	25–27	21–25	19–25		91–101	P2 P3
22 Sep	17:10	United States	3–0	Russia	25–23	26–24	25–17			76–64	P2 P3
23 Sep	10:30	Italy	3–1	Poland	26–24	22–25	25–22	25–19		98–90	P2 P3
23 Sep	14:15	Japan	2–3	Russia	29–27	17–25	25–21	17–25	13–15	101–113	P2 P3
23 Sep	18:40	United States	3–1	Argentina	25–20	25–21	17–25	25–20		92–86	P2 P3

==== Site B ====
Date	Time		Score		Set 1	Set 2	Set 3	Set 4	Set 5	Total	Report
21 Sep	11:10	Egypt	3–2	Tunisia	23–25	25–21	23–25	25–17	15–11	111–99	P2 P3
21 Sep	14:10	Canada	3–0	Venezuela	25–18	25–22	25–23			75–63	P2 P3
21 Sep	17:10	Australia	3–0	Iran	27–25	27–25	25–22			79–72	P2 P3
22 Sep	11:10	Egypt	3–1	Venezuela	25–18	20–25	25–18	25–20		95–81	P2 P3
22 Sep	14:10	Canada	3–0	Iran	25–23	29–27	26–24			80–74	P2 P3
22 Sep	17:10	Australia	3–0	Tunisia	25–19	25–17	25–19			75–55	P2 P3
23 Sep	11:10	Egypt	0–3	Iran	18–25	11–25	23–25			52–75	P2 P3
23 Sep	14:10	Canada	3–0	Tunisia	25–19	25–21	25–17			75–57	P2 P3
23 Sep	17:10	Australia	3–1	Venezuela	25–16	25–21	22–25	25–21		97–83	P2 P3

== Final standing ==
Rank	Team
1st place, gold medalist(s)	United States
2nd place, silver medalist(s)	Italy
3rd place, bronze medalist(s)	Poland
4	Russia
5	Argentina
6	Japan
7	Canada
8	Iran
9	Australia
10	Egypt
11	Venezuela
12	Tunisia

Qualified for the 2016 Summer Olympics

2015 Men's World Cup champions

United States
2nd title

Team roster
Matt Anderson, Aaron Russell, Taylor Sander, David Lee (c), Paul Lotman, Kawika Shoji, Micah Christenson, Russell Holmes, Jayson Jablonsky, Murphy Troy, Maxwell Holt, David Smith, Erik Shoji, Dustin Watten
Head coach
John Speraw

== Awards ==
- Most valuable player
  (United States) Matt Anderson
- Best setter
  (United States) Micah Christenson
- Best outside spikers
  (Italy) Osmany Juantorena
  (Japan) Yūki Ishikawa
- Best middle blockers
  (Argentina) Sebastián Sole
  (Iran) Mohammad Mousavi
- Best opposite spiker
  (Italy) Ivan Zaytsev
- Best libero
  (United States) Erik Shoji

== Statistics leaders ==
Best Scorers
Rank	Name	Points
1	(Egypt) Ahmed Abdelhay	230
2	(Argentina) Facundo Conte	214
3	(Italy) Ivan Zaytsev	197
4	(Japan) Kunihiro Shimizu	191
5	(Poland) Bartosz Kurek	190
6	(Japan) Yūki Ishikawa	188
7	(Australia) Thomas Edgar	176
8	(United States) Matt Anderson	172
9	(Russia) Dmitriy Muserskiy	157
10	(Italy) Osmany Juantorena	156

Best Spikers
Rank	Name	%Succ
1	(Italy) Ivan Zaytsev	59.15
2	(Italy) Osmany Juantorena	56.84
3	(Russia) Dmitriy Muserskiy	55.93
4	(Japan) Yūki Ishikawa	55.82
5	(Egypt) Ahmed Abdelhay	55.50
6	(Russia) Maxim Mikhaylov	54.81
7	(Iran) Amir Ghafour	53.55
8	(Japan) Kunihiro Shimizu	53.53
9	(Argentina) Facundo Conte	53.40
10	(Italy) Filippo Lanza	53.08

Best Blockers
Rank	Name	Avg/set
1	(Argentina) Sebastián Sole	0.81
2	(Iran) Mohammad Mousavi	0.80
3	(United States) Maxwell Holt	0.70
4	(Italy) Matteo Piano	0.63
5	(Argentina) Facundo Conte	0.55
6	(United States) David Lee	0.54
7	(Australia) Nehemiah Mote	0.54
8	(Canada) Justin Duff	0.50
9	(Egypt) Abd Elhalim Mohamed Abou	0.49
10	(Canada) Daniel Cornelius Jansen Vandoorn	0.48

Best Servers
Rank	Name	Avg/set
1	(United States) Matt Anderson	0.70
2	(Italy) Ivan Zaytsev	0.55
3	(Russia) Maxim Mikhaylov	0.51
4	(Poland) Mateusz Bieniek	0.48
5	(Japan) Masahiro Yanagida	0.45
6	(Poland) Bartosz Kurek	0.45
7	(Argentina) Facundo Conte	0.43
8	(United States) Micah Christenson	0.43
9	(Egypt) Ahmed Abdelhay	0.42
10	(Russia) Dmitriy Muserskiy	0.41

Best Setters
Rank	Name	Avg/set
1	(Japan) Hideomi Fukatsu	10.17
2	(United States) Micah Christenson	9.57
3	(Argentina) Luciano De Cecco	8.93
4	(Iran) Saeid Marouf	8.58
5	(Italy) Simone Giannelli	7.58
6	(Canada) TJ Sanders	7.20
7	(Venezuela) José Carrasco	6.63
8	(Poland) Fabian Drzyzga	5.90
9	(Russia) Sergey Grankin	4.65
10	(Australia) Grigory Sukochev	4.38

Best Diggers
Rank	Name	Avg/set
1	(Australia) Luke Perry	2.33
2	(Japan) Takeshi Nagano	2.33
3	(United States) Erik Shoji	2.22
4	(Italy) Massimo Colaci	2.11
5	(Tunisia) Tayeb Korbosli	1.92
6	(Poland) Paweł Zatorski	1.76
7	(Iran) Mehdi Marandi	1.45
8	(Tunisia) Moalla Ismail	1.39
9	(Italy) Osmany Juantorena	1.39
10	(Japan) Yūki Ishikawa	1.31

Best Receivers
Rank	Name	%Eff
1	(Egypt) Badawy Mohamed Moneim	58.62
2	(Iran) Milad Ebadipour	57.89
3	(Iran) Mehdi Marandi	53.54
4	(Poland) Rafał Buszek	52.20
5	(Argentina) Luciano Zornetta	52.17
6	(Poland) Michał Kubiak	51.79
7	(Canada) John Gordon Perrin	50.00
8	(Tunisia) Mohamed Ali Ben Othmen Miladi	50.00
9	(Canada) Nicholas Hoag	46.15
10	(Italy) Osmany Juantorena	45.28
