= Graham Vigrass =

Canadian volleyball player and coach (born 1989)

Personal information
- Full name: Graham Saxton Vigrass
- Born: 17 June 1989 (age 37); Calgary, Alberta, Canada
- Height: 2.05 m (6 ft 9 in)
- Education: University of Calgary

Volleyball information
- Position: Middle blocker

Career
Years	Teams
2007–2012; 2013–2014; 2014–2015; 2015–2016; 2016–2018; 2018–2019; 2019–2020; 2020–2021; 2021–2022; 2023-2024	Calgary Dinos; Arago de Sète; Étoile Sportive du Sahel V.C. Arkas İzmir; Berlin Recycling Volleys; Onico Warsaw; Jastrzębski Węgiel; Fenerbahçe İstanbul; Halkbank Ankara; Club Voleibol Guaguas

National team
2012–2022	Canada
Honours
Men's volleyball
Representing Canada
FIVB World League
Bronze medal – third place	2017 Curitiba
Pan American Games
Bronze medal – third place	2015 Toronto
- Coaching career

Current position
- Title: Head Coach
- Team: University of Calgary Men's Volleyball

Head coaching record
- Overall: Canada West Conference 2026/02/28 21-28 (.429) regular season and playoffs

Graham Saxton Vigrass (born 17 June 1989) is a Canadian university head coach and a former professional and Canadian national team volleyball player. He was a participant at two Olympic Games (Rio 2016, Tokyo 2020) and a bronze medallist at the 2017 World League. He became the head coach of the University of Calgary Dinos men's volleyball team in 2024.

== Personal life ==
Vigrass was born in Calgary, Alberta to parents Richard and Sandy Vigrass. His uncle, Don Saxton, played on the Canadian men's national volleyball team at the 1984 Los Angeles Summer Olympics, and his cousin, Ben Saxton, played beach volleyball at the 2016 Rio Summer Olympics. Vigrass started playing volleyball at the age of 13, and played in Calgary for the Canuck Volleyball Club and Western Canada High School.

== Playing career ==
=== University ===
Vigrass played U Sports men's volleyball with the University of Calgary Dinos for five seasons from 2007 to 2012. His time there was highlighted by leading the team to win the 2010 CIS Men's Volleyball Championship where he was also named the CIS Championship MVP. During the following season, as defending champions, the Dinos finished with a bronze medal in the 2011 CIS championship and Vigrass was named the CIS Men's volleyball player of the year and the Canada West representative at the Canadian University Athletes of the Year Awards for the top male university athlete in Canada.

=== Professional ===
Vigrass spent the 2012–13 season at the Team Canada National Excellence Program (NEP), formerly the Full Time Training Center (FTC), at the Centre Sportif in Gatineau, Canada, before signing in 2013 with Arago de Sète in Sete, France. He helped Étoile Sportive du Sahel V.C. win the Tunisian Volleyball Cup in 2015, before joining up with national team coach Glenn Hoag at Arkas Spor for the 2015–16 season, where they won bronze in the championship of the Turkish Men's Volleyball League. In 2016, Vigrass joined Berlin Recycling Volleys, teaming up with national teammate Steven Marshall, to win gold in the championship of the Deutsche Volleyball-Bundesliga, and again in 2017/2018, also placing 4th at the championship of the 2016-2017 Champion's League. In 2018, he joined team Onica Warsaw and joined national teammate Sharone Vernon-Evans and former national team coach Stephane Antiga, where they won silver in the championship of the Polish PlusLiga. In 2019, he joined Jastrzębski Węgiel. In 2020, he, and national teammate Nicholas Hoag, helped Fenerbahçe İstanbul become Turkish Men's Volleyball Super Cup champions. In 2021, Vigrass joined Halkbank Ankara and won silver in the CEV Challenge Cup. After a one-season hiatus away from the court, he returned to play for Club Voleibol Guaguas in Las Palmas, Gran Canaria, Canary Islands, Spain in 2023. While there, the team set a club record by advancing to the quarterfinals of the 2023-24 Champion's League. The team also won golds in the championship of the Spanish Superliga, Spanish Supercup, the Iberian Cup and the King's Cup. Vigrass retired as a professional player in 2024.

=== Canadian National Team ===
Vigrass first joined the national team program in 2008 as a member of Canada men's junior national volleyball team. He helped the team win silver at the 2008 Men's Junior NORCECA Volleyball Championship, and qualify for the 2009 FIVB Volleyball Men's U21 World Championship. Vigrass joined the senior national "B" team in 2010, helping them reach 4th at the 2011 Summer Universiade, before becoming a senior national team member in 2012. His success over ten years with the senior team resulted in the achievement of 5 team records and the tying of two previous team records. He was a member of the squad that finished tied for 7th place at the 2014 FIVB Volleyball Men's World Championship, and helped the team win gold at the NORCECA Championship, his first two team records, and bronze at the 2015 Pan American Games, tying a previous team record. He was also on the team that finished in 7th place at the 2015 Men's World Cup, tying another team record. His next team record was as a member of the squad that won bronze at the 2017 FIVB Volleyball World League. He also helped the national team finish tied for 5th at the 2016 Rio Summer Olympics and finish eighth at the 2020 Tokyo Summer Olympics. This set two team records, one by qualifying for consecutive Summer Olympics and one by qualifying for consecutive quarter finals at the Summer Olympics. Vigrass retired as a national team player in 2022.

== Player Honours ==
=== University ===
- 2010 Canadian University Men's Volleyball Championship, with Calgary Dinos
- 2011 Canadian University Men's Volleyball Championship, with Calgary Dinos

=== Professional ===
- 2014/2015 Tunisian Volleyball Cup, with Étoile Sportive du Sahel V.C.
- 2015/2016 Turkish Men's Volleyball League, with Arkas Spor
- 2016/2017 Deutsche Volleyball-Bundesliga, with Berlin Recycling Volleys
- 2016/2017 4th at the CEV Champions League, with Berlin Recycling Volleys
- 2017/2018 Deutsche Volleyball-Bundesliga, with Berlin Recycling Volleys
- 2018/2019 Polish PlusLiga, with Projekt Warsaw
- 2020/2021 Turkish Men's Volleyball Super Cup, with Fenerbahçe SK
- 2021/2022 CEV Challenge Cup, with Halkbank Ankara
- 2023/2024 Spanish Superliga, with Club Voleibol Guaguas
- 2023/2024 Played in the quarterfinals of the Champion's League, with Club Voleibol Guaguas, Club Record
- 2023/2024 Spanish Supercup, with Club Voleibol Guaguas
- 2023/2024 Iberian Cup, with Club Voleibol Guaguas
- 2023/2024 King's Cup, with Club Voleibol Guaguas
- 2024 Retired as a professional player

=== Canadian National Team ===
- 2008 Junior NORCECA Championship
- 2011 4th at the 2011 Summer Universiade
- 2014 Tied for 7th place Men's Volleyball World Championship Team Record
- 2015 NORCECA Championship Team Record
- 2015 Pan American Games Tied a Team Record
- 2015 7th place Men's World Cup Tied a Team Record
- 2016 Tied for 5th place 2016 Rio Summer Olympics
- 2017 FIVB World League Team Record
- 2020 Qualified for consecutive Summer Olympics Team Record
- 2021 Qualified for consecutive quarter finals at the Summer Olympics Team Record
- 2021 8th place 2020 Tokyo Summer Olympics
- 2022 Retired as a player from the national team

=== Individual Awards ===
- 2010 Canadian University Men's Volleyball Championship – MVP
- 2010/2011 Canadian University Men's Volleyball – Player of the Year
- 2010/2011 Canadian University Male Athlete of the Year Awards - Western Canada Representative
- 2017 FIVB World League – Best Middle Blocker

Awards
Preceded by (Brazil) Maurício Souza (Serbia) Srećko Lisinac	Best Middle Blocker of FIVB World League; 2017 ex aequo (France) Kévin Le Roux	Succeeded by Replaced by FIVB Nations League
