= Conrad Leinemann =

Canadian beach volleyball player (born 1971)

Personal information
- Nationality: Canadian
- Born: April 2, 1971 (age 55); Kelowna, British Columbia, Canada
- Height: 6 ft 3 in (1.91 m)

Beach volleyball information
Teammate
Jody Holden
Honours
Men's beach volleyball
Representing Canada
Pan American Games
Gold medal – first place	1999 Winnipeg	Beach

Conrad Leinemann (born April 2, 1971) is a male former beach volleyball player from Canada who won the gold medal in the men's beach team competition at the 1999 Pan American Games in Winnipeg, Manitoba, partnering with Jody Holden. He represented his native country at the 2000 Summer Olympics in Sydney, Australia.

In 2002, Leinemann and Holden won the Canadian men's beach volleyball championship.

Awards
Preceded by Inaugural	Men's FIVB Beach World Tour "Best Server"; 2005	Succeeded by Iver Horrem (NOR)
