= Volleyball at the 2015 Pan American Games – Men's tournament =

Volleyball – Men's tournament at the 2015 Pan American Games
- Venue: Exhibition Centre Hall A
- Dates: July 16 – July 26
- Competitors: 96 from 8 nations

Medalists
Gold medal	Argentina
Silver medal	Brazil
Bronze medal	Canada

The men's tournament of volleyball at the 2015 Pan American Games in Toronto, Canada, took place from July 16 to July 26. All games were held at the Exhibition Centre. The defending champions were Brazil.

== Teams ==
=== Qualification ===
The following nations qualified for the men's tournament:

Criteria	Vacancies	Qualified
Host Nation	1	Canada
North, Central American and Caribbean ranking	4	United States; Cuba; Puerto Rico; Mexico
South American Ranking	3	Brazil; Argentina; Colombia
Total	8	

=== Squads ===
At the start of tournament, all eight participating countries had 12 players on their rosters. Final squads for the tournament were due on June 16, 2015, a month before the start of 2015 Pan American Games.

- Argentina
- Brazil
- Canada
- Colombia
- Cuba
- Mexico
- Puerto Rico
- United States

== Preliminary round ==
All times are local Central Daylight Time (UTC-5)

Team qualified for the semifinals
Team qualified for the quarterfinals

=== Group A ===
Pos	Team	Pld	W	L	Pts	SPW	SPL	SPR	SW	SL	SR
1	Brazil	3	2	1	12	258	220	1.173	8	3	2.667
2	Argentina	3	2	1	9	243	205	1.185	6	4	1.500
3	Cuba	3	2	1	9	255	255	1.000	7	5	1.400
4	Colombia	3	0	3	0	149	225	0.662	0	9	0.000

Source: Archived 2016-03-04 at the Wayback Machine

17 July 2015; 13:35	Brazil	3–0	Colombia	Exhibition Centre, Toronto; Attendance: 2,000
17 July 2015; 13:35	(25–16, 25–13, 25–16) result statistics			Exhibition Centre, Toronto; Attendance: 2,000

17 July 2015; 21:00	Argentina	3–1	Cuba	Exhibition Centre, Toronto; Attendance: 3,050
17 July 2015; 21:00	(25–20, 25–15, 23–25, 25–15) result statistics			Exhibition Centre, Toronto; Attendance: 3,050

19 July 2015; 13:35	Brazil	2–3	Cuba	Exhibition Centre, Toronto; Attendance: 4,500
19 July 2015; 13:35	(20–25, 25–18, 23–25, 25–22, 11–15) result statistics			Exhibition Centre, Toronto; Attendance: 4,500

19 July 2015; 18:38	Argentina	3–0	Colombia	Exhibition Centre, Toronto; Attendance: 4,200
19 July 2015; 18:38	(25–14, 25–16, 25–21) result statistics			Exhibition Centre, Toronto; Attendance: 4,200

21 July 2015; 13:35	Brazil	3–0	Argentina	Exhibition Centre, Toronto; Attendance: 3,600
21 July 2015; 13:35	(29–27, 25–21, 25–22) result statistics			Exhibition Centre, Toronto; Attendance: 3,600

21 July 2015; 22:01	Cuba	3–0	Colombia	Exhibition Centre, Toronto; Attendance: 900
21 July 2015; 22:01	(25–16, 25–19, 25–18) result statistics			Exhibition Centre, Toronto; Attendance: 900

=== Group B ===
Pos	Team	Pld	W	L	Pts	SPW	SPL	SPR	SW	SL	SR
1	Canada	3	3	0	12	280	249	1.124	9	3	3.000
2	Puerto Rico	3	2	1	10	268	248	1.081	7	4	1.750
3	United States	3	1	2	7	295	294	1.003	6	7	0.857
4	Mexico	3	0	3	1	195	247	0.789	1	9	0.111

Source: Archived 2016-03-04 at the Wayback Machine

17 July 2015; 15:30	United States	1–3	Puerto Rico	Exhibition Centre, Toronto; Attendance: 1,700
17 July 2015; 15:30	(23–25, 26–24, 20–25, 26–28) result statistics			Exhibition Centre, Toronto; Attendance: 1,700

17 July 2015; 19:05	Canada	3–0	Mexico	Exhibition Centre, Toronto; Attendance: 4,500
17 July 2015; 19:05	(25–18, 25–19, 25–18) result statistics			Exhibition Centre, Toronto; Attendance: 4,500

19 July 2015; 16:46	Canada	3–1	Puerto Rico	Exhibition Centre, Toronto; Attendance: 4,500
19 July 2015; 16:46	(25–23, 25–23, 21–25, 25–20) result statistics			Exhibition Centre, Toronto; Attendance: 4,500

19 July 2015; 21:30	United States	3–1	Mexico	Exhibition Centre, Toronto; Attendance: 2,700
19 July 2015; 21:30	(20–25, 27–25, 25–16, 25–17) result statistics			Exhibition Centre, Toronto; Attendance: 2,700

21 July 2015; 15:47	Mexico	0–3	Puerto Rico	Exhibition Centre, Toronto; Attendance: 600
21 July 2015; 15:47	(23–25, 14–25, 20–25) result statistics			Exhibition Centre, Toronto; Attendance: 600

21 July 2015; 19:05	Canada	3–2	United States	Exhibition Centre, Toronto; Attendance: 4,500
21 July 2015; 19:05	(19–25, 25–27, 25–23, 25–16, 15–12) result statistics			Exhibition Centre, Toronto; Attendance: 4,500

== Elimination round ==
=== Championship bracket ===
Quarterfinals
A2	Argentina	3
B3	United States	0
B2	Puerto Rico	3
A3	Cuba	2

Semifinals
B1	Canada	1
A2	Argentina	3
A1	Brazil	3
B2	Puerto Rico	0

Final
A2	Argentina	3
A1	Brazil	2
Third place
B1	Canada	3
B2	Puerto Rico	1

=== Quarterfinals ===
22 July 2015; 19:11	Argentina	3–0	United States	Exhibition Centre, Toronto; Attendance: 4,500
22 July 2015; 19:11	(25–16, 25–21, 25–15) result statistics			Exhibition Centre, Toronto; Attendance: 4,500

22 July 2015; 21:12	Puerto Rico	3–2	Cuba	Exhibition Centre, Toronto; Attendance: 3,100
22 July 2015; 21:12	(20–25, 22–25, 25–21, 25–20, 15–11) result statistics			Exhibition Centre, Toronto; Attendance: 3,100

=== Seventh place match ===
24 July 2015; 13:35	Colombia	0–3	Mexico	Exhibition Centre, Toronto; Attendance: 3,500
24 July 2015; 13:35	(20–25, 17–25, 18–25) result statistics			Exhibition Centre, Toronto; Attendance: 3,500

=== Fifth place match ===
24 July 2015; 15:35	Cuba	3–1	United States	Exhibition Centre, Toronto; Attendance: 3,100
24 July 2015; 15:35	(28–30, 25–22, 25–14, 25–22) result statistics			Exhibition Centre, Toronto; Attendance: 3,100

=== Semifinals ===
24 July 2015; 19:05	Canada	1–3	Argentina	Exhibition Centre, Toronto; Attendance: 4,950
24 July 2015; 19:05	(26–28, 25–20, 21–25, 23–25) result statistics			Exhibition Centre, Toronto; Attendance: 4,950

24 July 2015; 21:53	Brazil	3–0	Puerto Rico	Exhibition Centre, Toronto; Attendance: 3,000
24 July 2015; 21:53	(25–16, 25–17, 25–23) result statistics			Exhibition Centre, Toronto; Attendance: 3,000

=== Bronze medal match ===
26 July 2015; 11:05	(bronze) Canada	3–1	Puerto Rico	Exhibition Centre, Toronto; Attendance: 4,900
26 July 2015; 11:05	(25–11, 25–12, 23–25, 25–18) result statistics			Exhibition Centre, Toronto; Attendance: 4,900

=== Gold medal match ===
26 July 2015; 15:05	(gold) Argentina	3–2	Brazil (silver)	Exhibition Centre, Toronto; Attendance: 4,900
26 July 2015; 15:05	(25–23, 18–25, 19–25, 25–23, 15–8) result statistics			Exhibition Centre, Toronto; Attendance: 4,900

== Final standings ==
Rank	Team
1st place, gold medalist(s)	Argentina
2nd place, silver medalist(s)	Brazil
3rd place, bronze medalist(s)	Canada
4	Puerto Rico
5	Cuba
6	United States
7	Mexico
8	Colombia

== Awards ==
- Most valuable player
  - Facundo Conte (ARG)
- Best outside hitters
  - Javier Jiménez (CUB)
  - Douglas Souza (BRA)
- Best middle blockers
  - Liván Osoria (CUB)
  - Luis Sosa (CUB)
- Best setter
  - Luciano De Cecco (ARG)
- Best opposite
  - Renan Buiatti (BRA)
- Best scorer
  - Gavin Schmitt (CAN)
- Best server
  - Gavin Schmitt (CAN)
- Best libero
  - Tiago Brendle (BRA)
- Best digger
  - Tiago Brendle (BRA)
- Best receiver
  - Tiago Brendle (BRA)

== Medalists ==
Event	Gold	Silver	Bronze
Men's tournament	Argentina; Javier Filardi; Nicolás Uriarte; Facundo Conte; José González; Sebastián Solé; Pablo Crer; Luciano De Cecco; Martín Ramos; Ezequiel Palacios; Maximiliano Gauna; Sebastián Closter; Luciano Zornetta	Brazil; Carlos Eduardo Silva; Thiago Veloso; Flávio Gualberto; Douglas Souza; Maurício Souza; Rafael Araújo; Murilo Radke; Maurício Borges Silva; João Rafael Ferreira; Renan Buiatti; Tiago Brendle; Otávio Pinto	Canada; TJ Sanders; John Gordon Perrin; Daniel Lewis; Rudy Verhoeff; Adam Simac; Dustin Schneider; Toontje van Lankvelt; Gavin Schmitt; Frederic Winters; Graham Vigrass; Nicholas Hoag; Steven Marshall
