= Jody Holden =

Canadian beach volleyball player (born 1968)

Personal information
- Born: August 20, 1968 (age 58); Shelburne, Nova Scotia, Canada
- Height: 193 cm (6 ft 4 in)
- Weight: 95 kg (209 lb)

Beach volleyball information
Teammate
Conrad Leinemann
Honours
Men's beach volleyball
Representing Canada
Pan American Games
Gold medal – first place	1999 Winnipeg	Beach

Jody Holden (born August 20, 1968) is a Canadian former beach volleyball player who won the gold medal in the men's beach team competition at the 1999 Pan American Games in Winnipeg, Manitoba, Canada, partnering with Conrad Leinemann. He represented his native country at the 2000 Summer Olympics in Sydney, Australia.
