= Justin Duff =

Canadian volleyball player (born 1988)

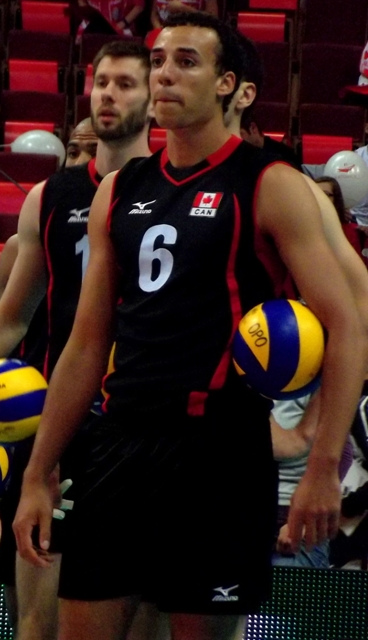

Personal information
- Full name: Justin William Duff
- Nickname: Duffman
- Born: May 10, 1988 (age 38); Winnipeg, Manitoba, Canada
- Height: 2.02 m (6 ft 8 in)
- Weight: 102 kg (225 lb)
- Spike: 367 cm (144 in)
- Block: 336 cm (132 in)
- Education: University of Winnipeg

Volleyball information
- Position: Middle blocker

Career
Years	Teams
2006–2010; 2010–2011; 2011–2013; 2013; 2014; 2014–2015; 2015–2016; 2016–2017; 2017–2018; 2018–2019	Winnipeg Wesmen; Aon hotVolleys Vienna; Arkas Izmir; Belogorie Belgorod; Yakarta Energy; Transfer Bydgoszcz; Benfica Lisbon; Olympiacos Piraeus; Espadon Szczecin; Galatasaray S.K.

National team
2011–2019	Canada
Honours
Men's volleyball
Representing Canada
FIVB World League
Bronze medal – third place	2017 Curitiba
NORCECA Championship
Gold medal – first place	2015 Córdoba
Bronze medal – third place	2011 Mayaguez
Bronze medal – third place	2013 Langley
- Last updated: June 13, 2017

Justin Duff (born May 10, 1988) is a former Canadian professional volleyball player. He was a member of Canada men's national volleyball team, a bronze medalist of NORCECA Championship (2011, 2013).

In July 2016, he was named to Canada's 2016 Olympic team.

== Career ==
=== Clubs ===
In 2014 he signed a contract with Transfer Bydgoszcz. After one season in Portuguese club Benfica Lisbon and one season in Greek Olympiacos Piraeus, he decided to come back to Poland and join Espadon Szczecin team.

== Sporting achievements ==
=== Club ===
==== National championships ====
- 2010/2011 Austrian Championship, with Aon hotVolleys Vienna
- 2011/2012 Turkish Championship, with Arkas Izmir
- 2012/2013 Turkish Championship, with Arkas Izmir
- 2012/2013 Russian Championship, with Belogorie Belgorod
- 2016/2017 Greek Cup, with Olympiacos Piraeus

=== National team ===
- 2011 Pan American Cup
- 2011 NORCECA Championship
- 2013 NORCECA Championship
- 2015 NORCECA Championship
