= Rafael Araújo (volleyball) =

Brazilian volleyball player (born 1991)

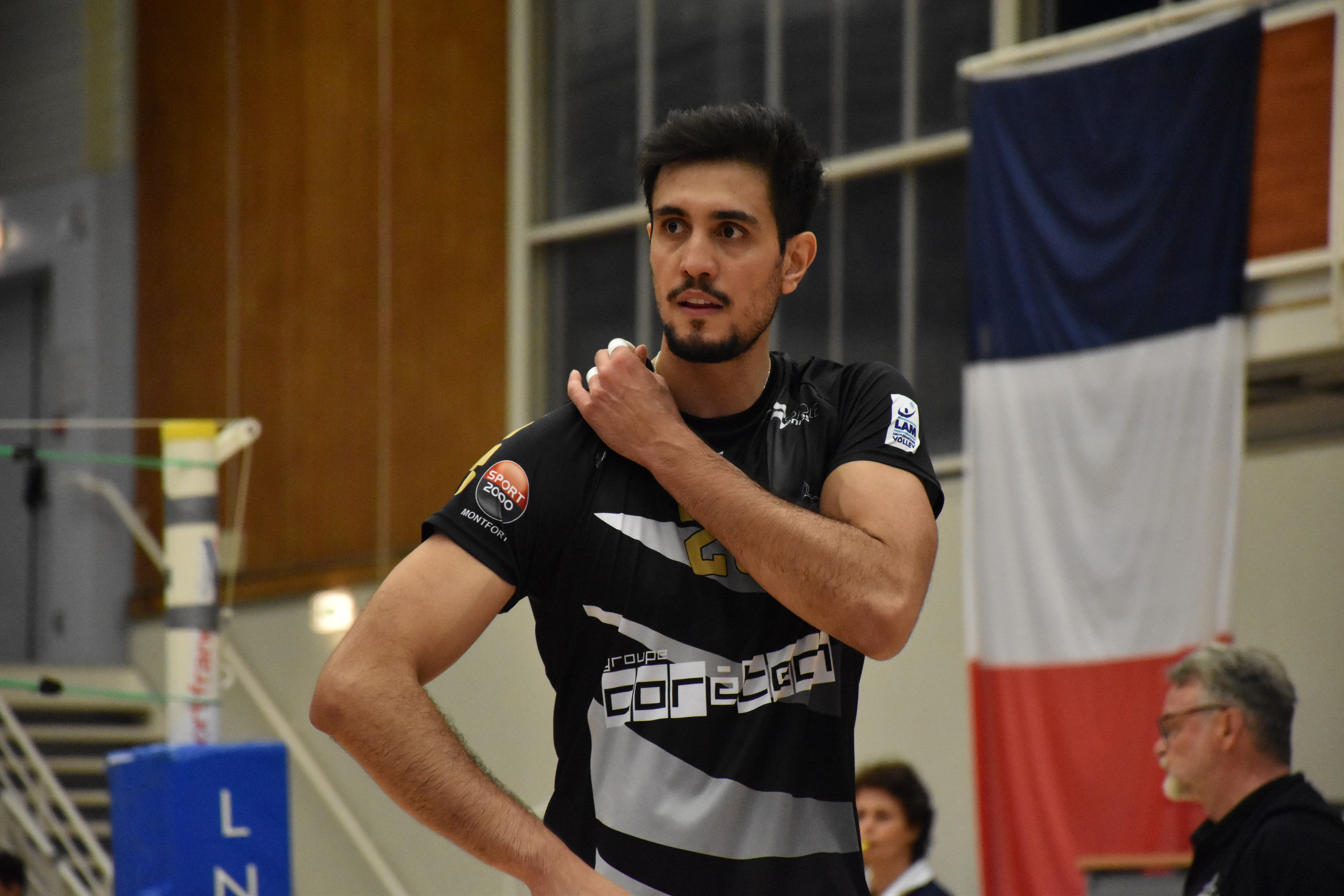
- Image of Rafael Rodrigues

Personal information
- Full name: Rafael Rodrigues de Araújo
- Nationality: Brazilian
- Born: June 13, 1991 (age 35); Umuarama, Paraná
- Height: 2.07 m (6 ft 9 in)
- Weight: 98 kg (216 lb)
- Spike: 348 cm (137 in)
- Block: 325 cm (128 in)

Volleyball information
- Position: Opposite spiker
- Current club: Rennes Volley

Career
| Years | Teams |
|---|---|
| 2009–2013 | Cimed/Florianópolis |
| 2013–2014 | Funvic Taubaté |
| 2014–2016 | SESI São Paulo |
| 2016–2018 | MKS Będzin |
| 2018–2019 | ONICO Warszawa |
| 2019 | Al-Ahli Doha |
| 2019–2020 | Rennes Volley |
| 2020–2021 | Narbonne Volley |
| 2022–2025 | Tokyo Great Bears |
| 2025–Present | Seoul Woori Card WooriWON |

National team
| 2014– | Brazil |
Medal record
Men's volleyball
Representing Brazil
World League
| Silver medal – second place | 2014 Florence | Team |
Pan American Games
| Silver medal – second place | 2015 Toronto | Team |

Rafael Rodrigues de Araújo (born June 13, 1991) is a Brazilian volleyball player, a member of the Brazil men's national volleyball team and Japanese club Tokyo Great Bears.

== Sporting achievements ==
=== Clubs ===
- 2009/2010 Brazilian Superliga, with Cimed/Florianópolis
- 2014/2015 Brazilian Superliga, with SESI São Paulo

=== South American Club Championship ===
- 2010 – with Cimed/Florianópolis

=== National team ===
- 2013 FIVB U23 World Championship
- 2014 FIVB World League
- 2015 Pan American Games
