= Adam Simac =

Canadian volleyball player (born 1983)

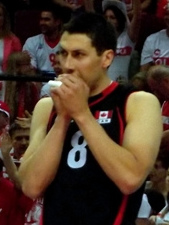
- Adam Simac in 2012

Personal information
- Nickname: Sheem
- Born: August 9, 1983 (age 43); Ottawa, Ontario, Canada
- Hometown: Ottawa, Ontario, Canada
- Height: 2.03 m (6 ft 8 in)
- Weight: 101 kg (223 lb)
- Spike: 348 cm (137 in)
- Block: 336 cm (132 in)
- Education: Queen's University

Volleyball information
- Position: Middle blocker

Career
| Years | Teams |
|---|---|
| 2001–2006; 2006–2008; 2008–2009; 2009–2010; 2010–2012; 2012–2013; 2013–2014; 2014–2015 | Queen's Golden Gaels; VBK Klagenfurt; SK Aich-Dob; VC Franken; ACH Volley; Arkas Spor; Pallavolo Lugano; ASUL Lyon |

National team
| 2008–2016 | Canada |
Honours
Men's volleyball
Representing Canada
NORCECA Championship
| Gold medal – first place | 2015 Detroit |
| Silver medal – second place | 2013 Langley |
| Bronze medal – third place | 2011 Mayaguez |
Pan American Games
| Bronze medal – third place | 2015 Toronto | Team |
- Last updated: 2024-08-07

Adam Simac (born August 9, 1983) is a Canadian former professional volleyball player. He played for the Canada men's national volleyball team for eight years, representing Canada at both the 2010 and 2014 FIVB Volleyball Men's World Championships.

== Career ==
=== University ===
Simac played college volleyball at Queen's University at Kingston for the Golden Gaels from 2001 to 2006. His time at Queen's was highlighted by leading the Gaels to a fifth-place finish at the 2006 national championship – their best finish in 34 years.

=== Club ===
Simac first played professionally in 2006 for Austrian club VBK Klagenfurt.

SK Aich/Dob

VC Franken

ACH Volley

Arkas Spor.

Lugano Volley

=== National team ===
Simac first joined the Canada men's national team in 2008. He participated in the 2009 Pan-Am Cup.

Following the 2015 Pan American Games, Simac had injury troubles with his shoulder and got surgery in December 2015. He spent the 2015-16 season rehabbing his shoulder at the Full-Time Centre in Gatineau with the goal of playing for Canada in the summer of 2016. Following rigorous rehab and training, Simac made the national team roster for the 2016 Olympic Qualifiers in Tokyo, where he helped Canada qualify for the 2016 Olympic Games - their first in 24 years. After being left off the 12-man roster for the Olympics, Simac retired from volleyball.

== Personal life ==
Adam Simac started playing volleyball at age 14 while attending Sir Wilfrid Laurier Secondary School.

Simac is married to former Canada women's national volleyball team member Ashley Voth.
