= Murilo Radke =

Brazilian volleyball player (born 1989)

Personal information
- Nationality: Brazilian
- Born: 31 January 1989 (age 37); Porto Alegre, Rio Grande do Sul
- Height: 1.98 m (6 ft 6 in)
- Weight: 89 kg (196 lb)
- Spike: 343 cm (135 in)
- Block: 320 cm (126 in)

Volleyball information
- Position: Setter
- Current club: (Brazil) Funvic Vôlei
- Number: 10

National team
2011–2017	Brazil
Honours
Men's volleyball
Representing Brazil
World League
Silver medal – second place	2014 Florence	Team
Pan American Games
Gold medal – first place	2011 Guadalajara	Team
Silver medal – second place	2015 Toronto	Team
U21 World Championship
Gold medal – first place	2009 India

Murilo Radke (born 31 January 1989) is a Brazilian male volleyball player. He is part of the Brazil men's national volleyball team. He played at the 2011 Pan American Games and 2015 Pan American Games. On club level he plays for the Greek club Foinikas Syros.

== Clubs ==
- (Brazil) Sada Cruzeiro (2008–2010)
- (Brazil) Pinheiros (2010–2011)
- (Brazil) Cimed Florianópolis (2011–2012)
- (Brazil) Vôlei Renata (2012–2013)
- (Brazil) APAV Vôlei (2013–2014)
- (Montenegro) Budvanska Rivijera Budva (2014–2015)
- (Poland) Chemik Bydgoszcz (2015–2016)
- (Brazil) América Vôlei (2016–2017)
- (Turkey) Jeopark Kula Belediyespor (2017–2018)
- (Turkey) Arkas Spor (2018–2019)
- (Italy) Argos Volley (2019–2020)
- (Greece) Foinikas Syros (2020–2021)
- (Brazil) Funvic Vôlei (2021)

== Sporting achievements ==
=== Clubs ===
- 2009 South American Club Championship – with Sada Cruzeiro

=== National team ===
- 2009 FIVB U21 World Championship
- 2011 Pan American Games
- 2013 Pan-American Cup
- 2014 FIVB World League
- 2015 Pan American Games
