= Tiago Brendle =

Brazilian male volleyball player

Personal information
- Full name: Tiago Brendle
- Nationality: Brazilian
- Born: 21 October 1985 (age 41) Condor, Rio Grande do Sul
- Height: 1.88 m (6 ft 2 in)
- Weight: 83 kg (183 lb)
- Spike: 315 cm (124 in)
- Block: 300 cm (118 in)

Volleyball information
- Position: Libero
- Current club: (Brazil) APAN Blumenau

Career
- Years: Team
- 2004–2006: Bento Vôlei
- 2006–2007: UCS Sogipa
- 2007–2008: São Bernardo Vôlei
- 2008–2009: Bento Vôlei
- 2009–2010: América Vôlei
- 2010–2011: Minas Tênis Clube
- 2011–2012: Vôlei Futuro
- 2012–2013: Funvic Taubaté
- 2013–2014: América Vôlei
- 2014–2015: Ziober Maringá Vôlei
- 2015–2017: Vôlei Renata
- 2017–2020: SESC-RJ
- 2020–2021: Montes Claros Vôlei
- 2021–: Apan Vôlei

National team
- Years: Team
- 2015–2017: Brazil
Honours
Men's volleyball
Representing Brazil
World Grand Champions Cup
Gold medal – first place	2017 Japan	Team
World League
Silver medal – second place	2016 Kraków	Team
Silver medal – second place	2017 Curitiba	Team
Pan American Games
Silver medal – second place	2015 Toronto	Team
South American Championship
Gold medal – first place	2015 Maceió
Gold medal – first place	2017 Santiago/Temuco

Tiago Brendle (born 21 October 1985) is a Brazilian male volleyball player. He is part of the Brazil men's national volleyball team. On club level he plays for APAN Blumenau.

== Awards ==
=== National team ===
- 2005 FIVB U21 World Championship
- 2015 Pan American Games
- 2015 South American Championship
- 2016 FIVB World League
- 2017 FIVB World League
- 2017 South American Championship
- 2017 FIVB World Grand Champions Cup

=== Individual ===
- 2015 Pan American Games – Best Libero
- 2015 Pan American Games – Best Receiver
- 2015 Pan American Games – Best Digger
- 2017–18 Brazilian Superliga – Best Digger
