= Carlos Eduardo Silva =

Brazilian volleyball player (born 1994)

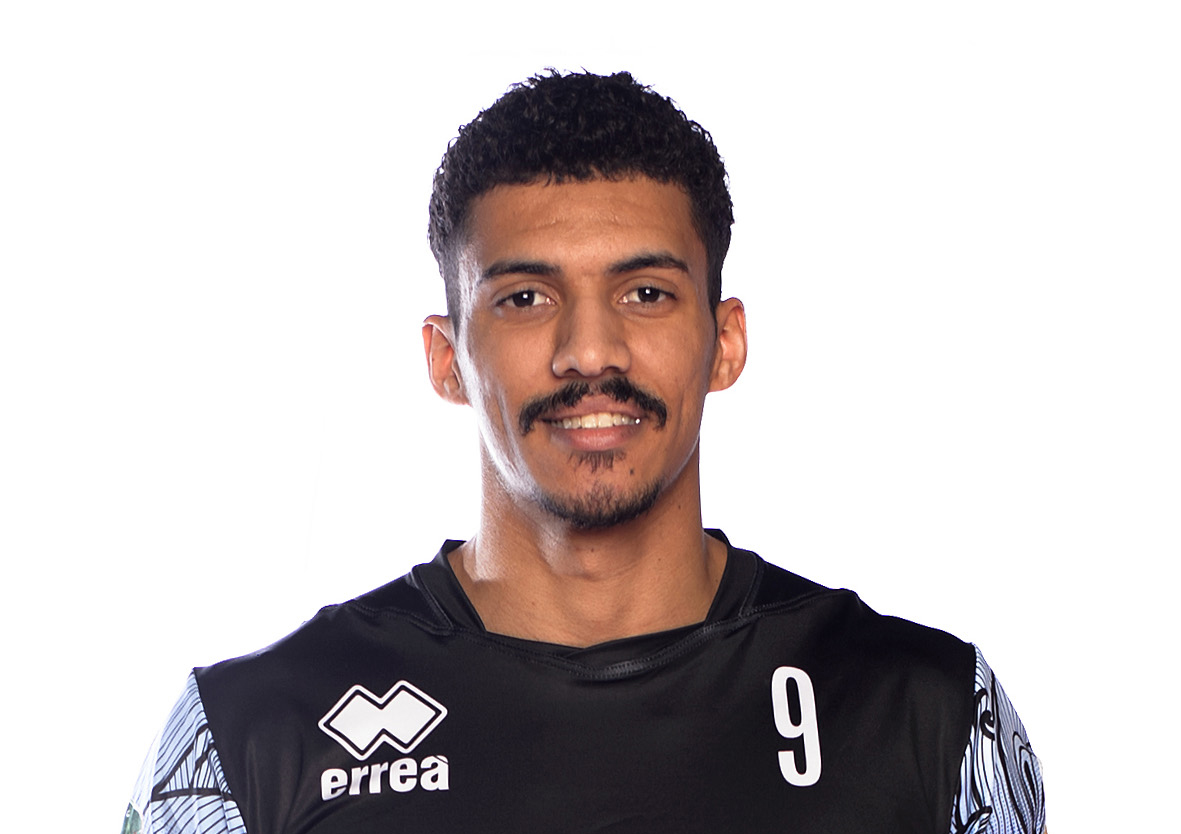
- Silva in 2019

Personal information
- Full name: Carlos Eduardo Barreto Silva
- Nickname: Kadu
- Born: 8 August 1994 (age 32); Valinhos, São Paulo, Brazil
- Height: 2.00 m (6 ft 7 in)
- Weight: 90 kg (198 lb)
- Spike: 348 cm (137 in)
- Block: 340 cm (134 in)

Volleyball information
- Position: Outside spiker
- Current club: Paris Volley
- Number: 15

Career
| Years | Teams |
|---|---|
| 2009–2012 | Pinheiros |
| 2012–2013 | Olympico Club |
| 2013–2015 | Sada Cruzeiro |
| 2015–2016 | Montes Claros Vôlei |
| 2016–2017 | Vibo Valentia |
| 2018–2019 | Vibo Valentia |
| 2019– | Paris Volley |

National team
| 2015– | Brazil |
Honours
Men's volleyball
Representing Brazil
World Championship
| Silver medal – second place | 2018 Italy-Bulgaria | Team |
Pan American Games
| Silver medal – second place | 2015 Toronto | Team |
| Bronze medal – third place | 2019 Lima | Team |
South American Championship
| Gold medal – first place | 2015 Maceió |
- Last updated: June 2019

Carlos Eduardo Barreto Silva (born 8 August 1994) is a Brazilian indoor volleyball player. He is a current member of the Brazil men's national volleyball team.

== Sporting achievements ==
=== Clubs ===
==== FIVB Club World Championship ====
- 2013 – with Sada Cruzeiro
- 2015 – with Sada Cruzeiro

=== National team ===
- 2013 FIVB U21 World Championship
- 2015 Pan-American Cup
- 2015 Pan American Games
- 2015 South American Championship
- 2018 FIVB World Championship
- 2019 Pan American Games

=== Individuals ===
- 2019 Pan American Games – Best outside spiker
