= Luciano Zornetta =

Argentine volleyball player (born 1993)

Personal information
- Nationality: Argentine
- Born: 6 March 1993 (age 33)
- Hometown: Buenos Aires, Argentina
- Height: 185 cm (6 ft 1 in)
- Weight: 77 kg (170 lb)
- Spike: 346 cm (136 in)
- Block: 315 cm (124 in)

Volleyball information
- Position: Spiker
- Number: 22 (national team) 18 (club)

Career
Years
2015
2020-21
2021-22
2022-23
2023-24
2024-25
Teams
Boca Rio Uruguay Seg.
Pineto Volley
Ssd Sabaudia
Ssd Sabaudia
Pallavolo Macerata
Bcc Tecnobus Castellana Grotte

National team
2011 World Cup
2012 Sudamerican Cup
2013 World Cup / Pan American Cup
2014 Sudamerican Cup
2015 World League / Pan American Cup / World Cup Japan
Argentina
Honours
Men's volleyball
Representing Argentina
Pan American Games
Gold medal – first place	2015 Toronto	Team

Luciano Zornetta (born 6 March 1993) is an Argentine volleyball player. He is part of the Argentina men's national volleyball team. At club level he plays for Boca Rio Uruguay Seg.
