= Dustin Schneider =

Canadian volleyball player (born 1985)

Personal information
- Nationality: Canadian
- Born: 27 February 1985 (age 41); Brandon, Manitoba
- Hometown: Brandon, Manitoba
- Height: 1.82 m (6 ft 0 in)
- Weight: 82 kg (181 lb)
- Spike: 322 cm (127 in)
- Block: 297 cm (117 in)
- Education: University of Winnipeg

Volleyball information
- Position: Setter

Career
Years	Teams
2004–2008; 2009–2010; 2010–2011; 2011–2012; 2013–2014; 2015–2016	Winnipeg Wesmen; VCA Niederösterreic; S.L. Benfica; Chaumont VB 52; ZAKSA; Maccabi Tel Aviv

National team
2007–2016	Canada
Honours
Men's volleyball
Representing Canada
NORCECA Championship
Gold medal – first place	2015 Mexico
Silver medal – second place	2013 Langley
Bronze medal – third place	2013 Mayaguez
Pan American Games
Bronze medal – third place	2015 Toronto	Team
Pan-American Cup
Silver medal – second place	2009 Chiapas

Dustin Schneider (born 27 February 1985) is a Canadian retired professional volleyball player. He was the setter for the Canada men's national volleyball team for 9 years, helping the team win medals at the NORCECA Championship three separate times, as well as a bronze medal at the 2015 Pan American Games.

== Career ==
=== Club ===
Dustin began his post-secondary volleyball career with the University of Winnipeg Wesmen in 2004. He would go on to lead the team to a CIS championship in 2007, being named MVP along the way. In 2009, he began his professional career with Austrian club VCA Niederösterreic, before going on to play for several different European clubs throughout his career.

=== National team ===
Dustin joined the national team program in 2007. He helped the team win bronze, silver, and gold at the NORCECA Championship in 2011, 2013, and 2015 respectively, as well as a bronze medal at the 2009 Men's Pan-American Volleyball Cup and 2015 Pan American Games. He announced his retirement from volleyball in 2016.

== Sporting achievements ==
=== Clubs ===
==== National championships ====
- 2006/2007 CIS Championship, with Winnipeg Wesmen
- 2007/2008 CIS Championship, with Winnipeg Wesmen
- 2010/2011 Portuguese Volleyball First Division, with S.L. Benfica
- 2011/2012 French Ligue B, with Chaumont VB 52
- 2013/2014 Polish Men's Volleyball Cup, with ZAKSA

=== National team ===
- 2009 Pan American Cup
- 2011 NORCECA Championship
- 2013 NORCECA Championship
- 2015 Pan American Games
- 2015 NORCECA Championship
