= Javier Filardi =

Argentine volleyball player (born 1980)

Personal information
- Nationality: Argentine
- Born: 7 February 1980 (age 46)
- Height: 1.90 m (6 ft 3 in)
- Weight: 89 kg (196 lb)
- Spike: 340 cm (134 in)
- Block: 318 cm (125 in)

Volleyball information
- Number: 2

Career
Years	Teams
2013-	(Argentina) UPCN San Juan

National team
2006-	Argentina
Honours
Men's volleyball
Representing Argentina
Pan American Games
Gold medal – first place	2015 Toronto	Team

Javier Filardi (born 7 February 1980) is an Argentine volleyball player. He was part of the Argentina men's national volleyball team at the 2014 FIVB Volleyball Men's World Championship in Poland, where the team finished joint 10th, with Cuba. He played with UPCN San Juan. Last year, he won the bronze medal in Brazil, and this year, he was part of the team that won the South America Clubs Championship.

== Clubs ==
- UPCN San Juan (2013-)
