= John Gordon Perrin =

Canadian volleyball player (born 1989)

John Perrin
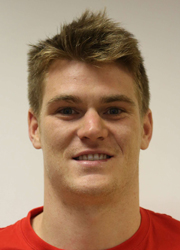

Personal information
- Full name: John Gordon Perrin
- Nickname: Gord
- Nationality: (Canada) Canadian
- Born: 17 August 1989 (age 37); Creston, Canada
- Height: 2.01 m (6 ft 7 in)
- Weight: 95 kg (209 lb)
- Spike: 358 cm (141 in)
- Block: 326 cm (128 in)
- Education: Thompson Rivers University

Volleyball information
- Position: Outside hitter
- Current club: (Greece) Olympiacos Piraeus
- Number: 8

Career
Years	Teams
2008–2011; 2011–2015; 2015–2016; 2016–2017; 2017–2018; 2018–2019; 2019–2020; 2020–2021; 2021–2022; 2022–2023; 2023; 2023–2024; 2024–	(Canada) Thompson Rivers WolfPack (Turkey) Arkas İzmir (Italy) Volley Piacenza (Poland) Asseco Resovia (China) Beijing Volleyball (Russia) Belogorie Belgorod (Brazil) Sada Cruzeiro (Russia) Ural Ufa (Russia) Lokomotiv Novosibirsk (Italy) BluVolley Verona (Russia) Lokomotiv Novosibirsk (Turkey) Halkbank (Greece) Olympiacos Piraeus

National team
2011–2021	Canada
Honours
Men's volleyball
Representing Canada
FIVB World League
Bronze medal – third place	2017 Curitiba
Pan American Games
Bronze medal – third place	2015 Toronto
Pan American Cup
Bronze medal – third place	2011 Gatineau
NORCECA Championship
Gold medal – first place	2015 Mexico
Silver medal – second place	2013 Canada
Bronze medal – third place	2011 Puerto Rico
Bronze medal – third place	2017 United States
Bronze medal – third place	2019 Canada
NORCECA Champions Cup
Gold medal – first place	2015 Detroit
- Last updated: 6 April 2026

John Gordon "Gord" Perrin (born 17 August 1989) is a Canadian volleyball player. He was a three–time Turkish Champion (2013, 2015, 2024). Perrin is a retired member of the Canada men's national volleyball team, participating in two Olympic Games (Rio 2016 & Tokyo 2020), as well as winning gold at the 2015 Men's NORCECA Volleyball Championship.

== Personal life ==
Perrin was born in Creston, British Columbia to Dave Perrin and Ruth Boehmer. He has one brother, Marshall, and two sisters, Joan and Alicia, who played volleyball for the Canadian national women's team. He attended Thompson Rivers University from 2007 to 2010.

== Career ==
=== University ===
Perrin was a member of the Thompson Rivers University Wolfpack men's volleyball team for three seasons from 2007 to 2010. During his time there, he helped the team win bronze in the 2008 CIS Men's Volleyball Championship, finishing the tournament as a tournaments all-star, and for the 2009-10 season, Perrin was named Thompson Rivers University athlete of the year.

=== Club ===
For the 2011/12 season, he signed with Turkish club Arkas Spor, helping the club finish runners up in the national championship in his first season. During his time in Turkey, he helped the team win the Turkish Men's Volleyball League twice, in 2013 and 2015, as well as being awarded the Best Server award for the 2013/2014 season. In addition to domestic success, Perrin also helped the team finish a record high of 4th place in the CEV Champions League.

In 2015, Perrin signed with Volley Piacenza in Italy, but his season was cut short due to a surgery required to fix a torn left meniscus in March 2015. For the 2016/17 season, he signed with Polish club Asseco Resovia Rzeszów, reuniting him with fellow national team member Gavin Schmitt. In April 2017 Perrin extended a contract with Asseco Resovia Rzeszów, and he wanted to continue his career in PlusLiga. In July 2017 he talked publicly about his moving to Chinese league despite the currently signed contract with Resovia. The club did not want to cancel their agreement and applied to FIVB on blocking unprofessional situations when a player wants to void already signed contract without previous fulfillment. Perrin broke agreement and went to Beijing Volleyball.

=== National team ===
Perrin was a member of the Canada men's youth national team in 2006. With the team, they finished 4th at the Boys' Youth NORCECA Volleyball Championship. Two years later, he joined the Canada men's junior national volleyball team, and helped the team finish second at the 2008 Men's Junior NORCECA Volleyball Championship.

He joined the senior Canada men's national volleyball team program in 2011. He has been a member of every FIVB World League squad since 2012, helping the team finish a national team record 5th place in 2013. He was also member of the squad that finished a national team record 7th place at the 2014 FIVB Volleyball Men's World Championship, and he helped the team win bronze at the 2015 Pan American Games. In addition to all this, Perrin also helped the team win bronze at the 2011 NORCECA Championship, silver at the 2013 NORCECA Championship, and gold at the 2015 NORCECA Championship.

Perrin was a member of the squad that finished 5th at the 2016 Summer Olympics. In June 2021, Perrin was named to Canada's 2020 Olympic team. At the Summer Olympics in Tokyo, the Canadian team finished 4th in their group, qualifying them for the quarterfinals. In the quarters, they lost to Russia (Russian Olympic Committee), 3-0.

Perrin announced he was retiring from the national team in November 2021.

== Sporting achievements ==
=== Clubs ===
- FIVB Club World Championship
  - Brazil 2019 – with Sada Cruzeiro
- CSV South American Club Championship
  - Contagem 2020 – with Sada Cruzeiro
- CEV Challenge Cup
  - 2018/2019 – with Belogorie Belgorod
- National championships
  - 2011/2012 Turkish Championship, with Arkas İzmir
  - 2012/2013 Turkish Championship, with Arkas İzmir
  - 2014/2015 Turkish Championship, with Arkas İzmir
  - 2017/2018 Chinese Championship, with Beijing Volleyball
  - 2021/2022 Russian Championship, with Lokomotiv Novosibirsk
  - 2022/2023 Russian Championship, with Lokomotiv Novosibirsk
  - 2023/2024 Turkish Championship, with Halkbank Ankara
  - 2024/2025 Hellenic Championship, with Olympiacos Piraeus
- National cups
  - 2011 Turkish Super Cup, with Arkas Izmir
  - 2013 Turkish Super Cup, with Arkas Izmir
  - 2023 Turkish Super Cup, with Halkbank Ankara
  - 2019/2020 Brazilian Cup, with Sada Cruzeiro
  - 2023/2024 Turkish Cup, with Halkbank Ankara
  - 2024/2025 Hellenic League Cup, with Olympiacos Piraeus
  - 2024 Hellenic Super Cup, with Olympiacos Piraeus
  - 2024/2025 Hellenic Cup, with Olympiacos Piraeus
  - 2025/2026 Hellenic League Cup, with Olympiacos Piraeus
  - 2025 Hellenic Super Cup, with Olympiacos Piraeus

=== Youth national team ===
- 2008 NORCECA U21 Championship

=== Individual awards ===
- 2008: NORCECA U21 Championship – Best blocker
- 2013: Turkish Championship – Best server
- 2015: NORCECA Championship – Best outside hitter
- 2025: Hellenic Cup – MVP
