= Facundo Conte =

Argentine volleyball player (born 1989)

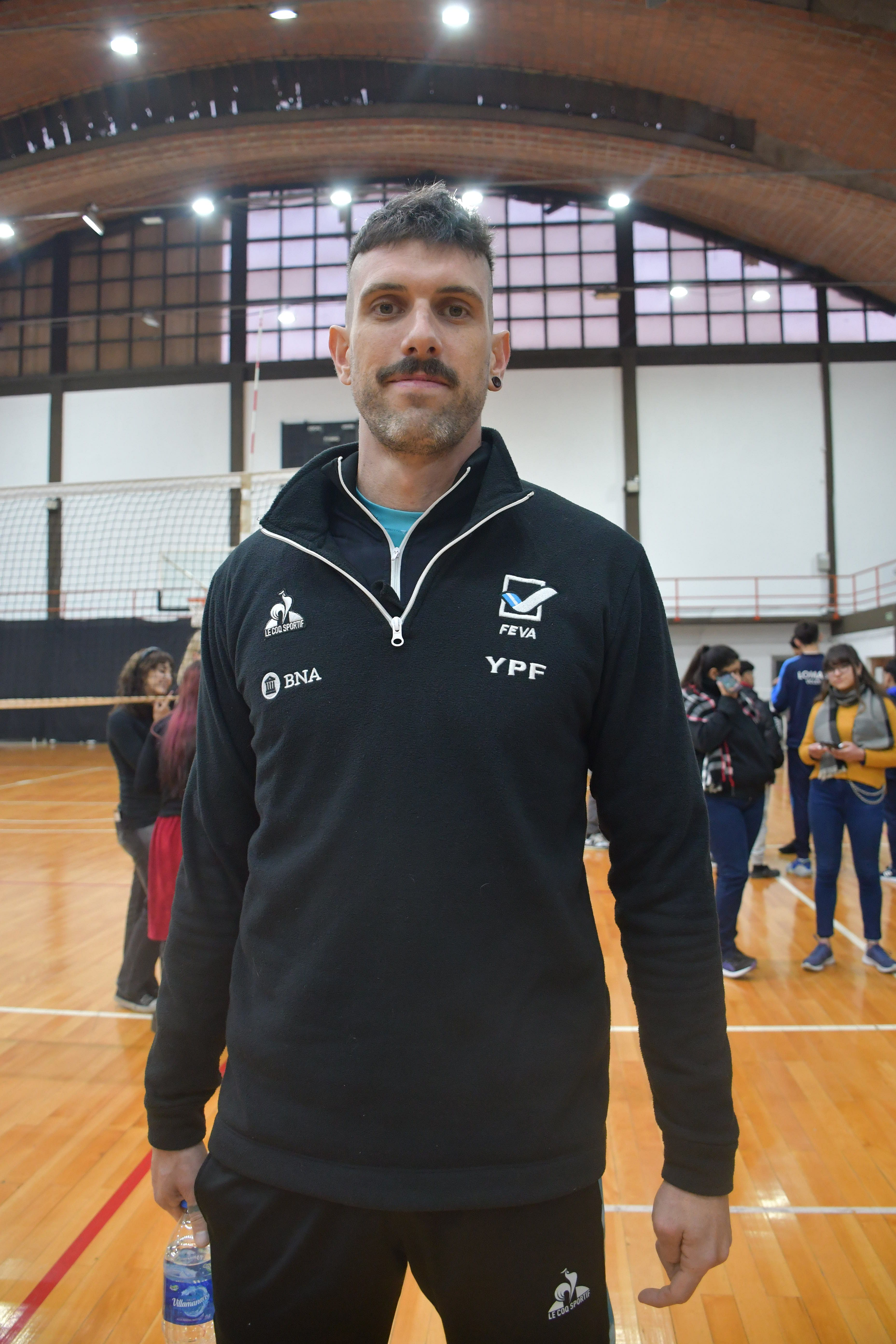
- Conte in 2024

Personal information
- Born: 25 August 1989 (age 37); Vicente López, Argentina
- Height: 1.97 m (6 ft 6 in)

Volleyball information
- Position: Outside hitter

Career
Years	Teams
2005–2006; 2006–2007; 2007–2009; 2009–2010; 2010–2011; 2011; 2011–2012; 2012–2013; 2013–2016; 2016–2018; 2017; 2018–2019; 2019–2021; 2021–2022; 2022–2024	Rosario Sonder; GEBA; Pallavolo Catania; Zinella Volley; Volley Lube; Umbria Volley; Gabeca Pallavolo; Dynamo Krasnodar; Skra Bełchatów; Shanghai Golden Age; El Jaish; Funvic Taubaté; Sada Cruzeiro; Warta Zawiercie; Ciudad Vóley

National team
2008–2024	Argentina
Honours
Men's volleyball
Representing Argentina
Olympic Games
Bronze medal – third place	2020 Tokyo
Pan American Games
Gold medal – first place	2015 Toronto
Silver medal – second place	2023 Santiago
CSV South American Championship
Gold medal – first place	2023 Recife
Silver medal – second place	2011 Brazil

Facundo Conte (born 25 August 1989) is an Argentine former professional volleyball player. Conte won a bronze medal at the Olympic Games Tokyo 2020.

== Personal life ==
Facundo was born in Vicente López, Argentina. His father, Hugo Conte, is a former volleyball player who was part of the national team that won a bronze medal at the 1988 Olympic Games. He finished his secondary studies in Centro Cultural Italiano in Olivos.

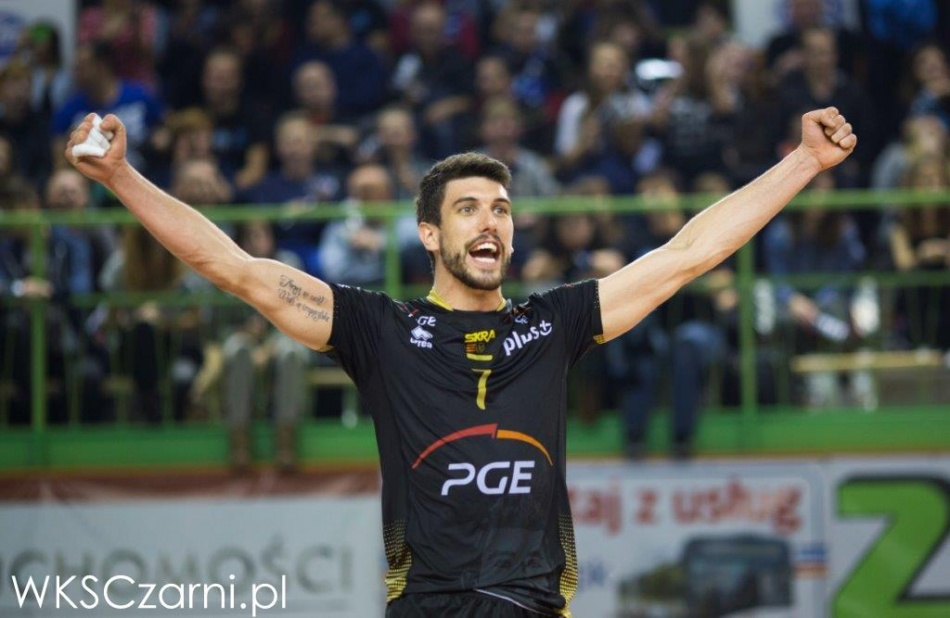
Conte during the 2014–15 PlusLiga season as PGE Skra Bełchatów player.

== Career ==
Conte made his debut in the Argentina national team during the U19 World Championship (4th place) in 2007, and in the senior team during the 2008 America's Cup, held in Brazil (4th place). Conte was also a part of the junior national team that won the 2008 South American Championship, defeating Brazil in the final and breaking a 26–year period without winning the tournament.

In 2009, Conte took part in his first World League, finishing 5th with Argentina. After that, he joined Zinella Bologna, where he was coached by his father, Hugo. During that year, Conte also helped Argentina finish third at the U21 World Championship, the country's best position in the history of the tournament.

In 2010, Conte participated in the World League, but this time Argentina was unsuccessful, losing all 14 games. In September of that year, Conte was selected by coach Javier Weber to participate in the World Championship.

In 2015, Conte won a gold medal in the 2015 Pan American Games.

In 2013, he signed a contract with PGE Skra Bełchatów. He won the Polish Champion title in 2014. On 8 October 2014, his team won the Polish SuperCup. In February 2015, he signed a contract with Skra until 2017. On 7 February 2016, he won the Polish Cup after beating ZAKSA in the final. On 29 April 2016, he left the team from Bełchatów.

After competing in PlusLiga for three seasons, Conte signed a contract with Shanghai Golden Age, and played there for two seasons. In 2017, he moved to El Jaish in Qatar for the Qatar Cup and Emir Cup competitions.

== Honours ==
=== Club ===
- FIVB Club World Championship
  - Betim 2019 – with Sada Cruzeiro
- CSV South American Club Championship
  - Contagem 2020 – with Sada Cruzeiro
  - Blumenau 2024 – with Ciudad Vóley
- CEV Challenge Cup
  - 2010–11 – with Lube Banca Macerata
- Domestic
  - 2005–06 Argentine Championship, with Rosario Sonder
  - 2013–14 Polish Championship, with PGE Skra Bełchatów
  - 2014–15 Polish SuperCup, with PGE Skra Bełchatów
  - 2015–16 Polish Cup, with PGE Skra Bełchatów
  - 2016–17 Chinese Championship, with Shanghai Golden Age
  - 2017–18 Chinese Championship, with Shanghai Golden Age
  - 2018–19 Brazilian Championship, with Vôlei Taubaté
  - 2019–20 Brazilian Cup, with Sada Cruzeiro
  - 2020–21 Brazilian Cup, with Sada Cruzeiro
  - 2022–23 Argentine Cup, with Ciudad Vóley
  - 2022–23 Argentine Championship, with Ciudad Vóley
  - 2023–24 Argentine Cup, with Ciudad Vóley
  - 2023–24 Argentine Championship, with Ciudad Vóley

=== Youth national team ===
- 2006 CSV U19 South American Championship
- 2008 CSV U21 South American Championship

=== Individual awards ===
- 2014: Polish SuperCup – Most valuable player
- 2015: CEV Champions League – Best outside spiker
- 2015: Pan American Games – Most valuable player
- 2016: Polish Cup – Best receiver
- 2019: FIVB Club World Championship – Best outside spiker
- 2020: CSV South American Club Championship – Best outside hitter

=== Statistics ===
- 2015–16 PlusLiga – Best server (44 aces)

Awards
Preceded by Not awarded	Best Outside Spiker of CEV Champions League; 2014/2015 ex aequo (Cuba) Wilfredo León	Succeeded by (Cuba) Wilfredo León (Slovenia) Tine Urnaut
Preceded by (Cuba) Wilfredo León	Most Valuable Player of Pan American Games; 2015	Succeeded by (Argentina) Nicolás Bruno
