= José Luis González (volleyball) =

Argentine volleyball player (born 1984)

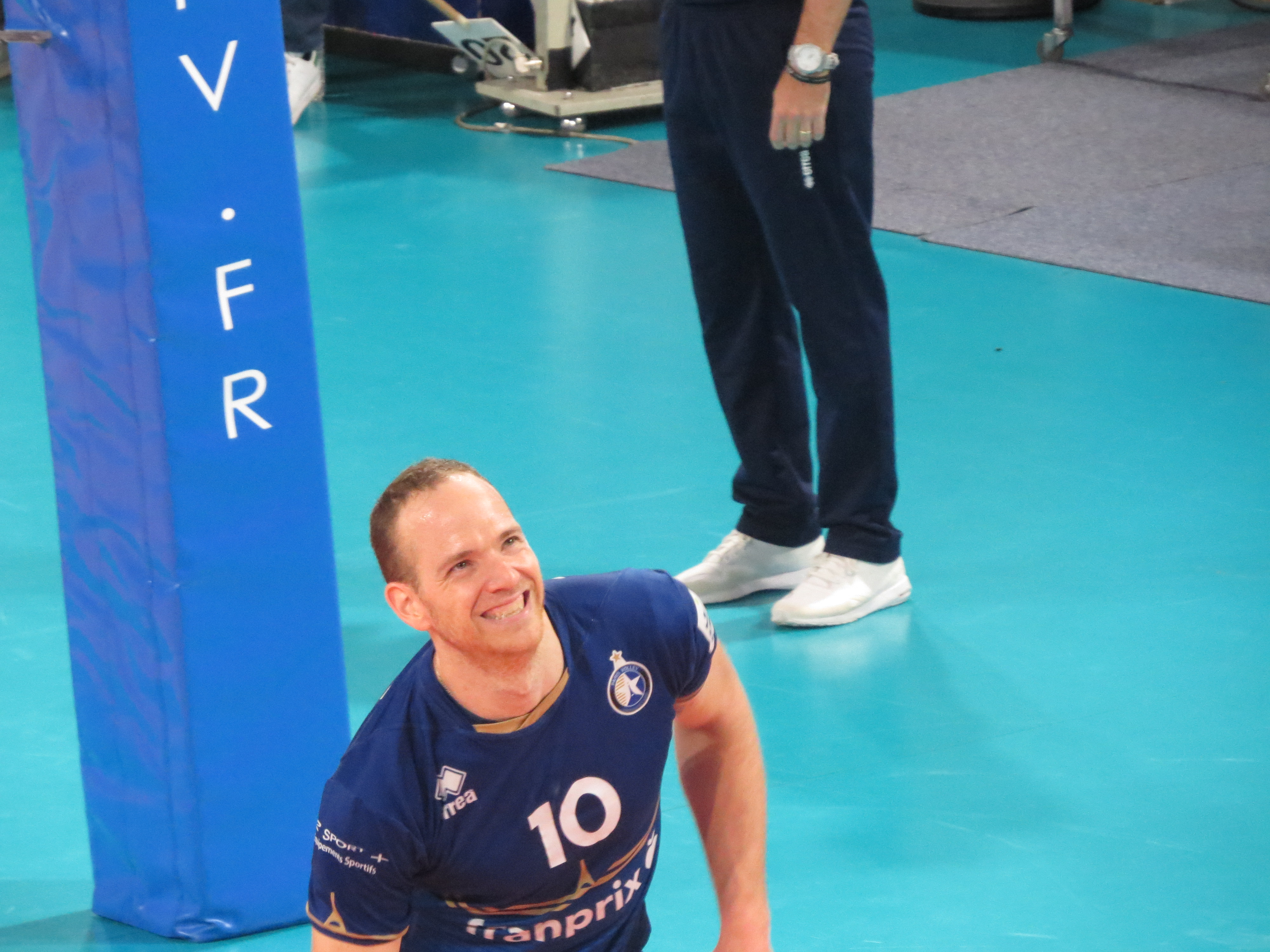

Personal information
- Nationality: Argentine
- Born: 27 December 1984 (age 41)
- Height: 2.06 m (6 ft 9 in)
- Weight: 97 kg (214 lb)
- Spike: 350 cm (138 in)
- Block: 333 cm (131 in)

Volleyball information
- Position: Opposite
- Current club: (France) Saint-Nazaire Volley-Ball Atlantique
- Number: 10

Career
Years	Teams
2002–2005	(Peru) Alianza Jesus Maria
2005–2006	(Argentina) Sonder Rosario
2006–2008	(Argentina) Misiones Voley
2008-2009	(Argentina) Belgrano de Cordoba
2009–2010	(Cyprus) Dionysos Stroumpi
2010–2011	(Greece) AEK V.C.
2011–2012	(Greece) Ethnikos Alexandroupolis
2012–2013	(Turkey) Gümüşhane Torul Gençlik
2013	(United Arab Emirates) Ajman Sport Club
2013–2015	(Poland) BBTS Bielsko-Biała
2015–2016	(Argentina) Obras Sanitarias San Juan
2016–2017	(Greece) Panathinaikos
2017–2018	(France) GFC Ajaccio
2018–	(France) Paris Volley

National team
2008–2018	Argentina
Honours
Men's volleyball
Representing Argentina
South American Volleyball Championship
Silver medal – second place	2005 Lages
Pan American Games
Gold medal – first place	2015 Toronto

José Luis González (born 27 December 1984) is an Argentine volleyball player. He was part of the Argentina men's national volleyball team at the 2014 FIVB Volleyball Men's World Championship in Poland. On club level he plays for Paris Volley.

== Sporting achievements ==
=== National team ===
- 2005 South American Volleyball Championship
- 2015 Pan American Games

=== Club level ===
- 2006 Liga Argentina de Voleibol
