= Toontje van Lankvelt =

Canadian volleyball player (born 1984)

Toon Van Lankvelt
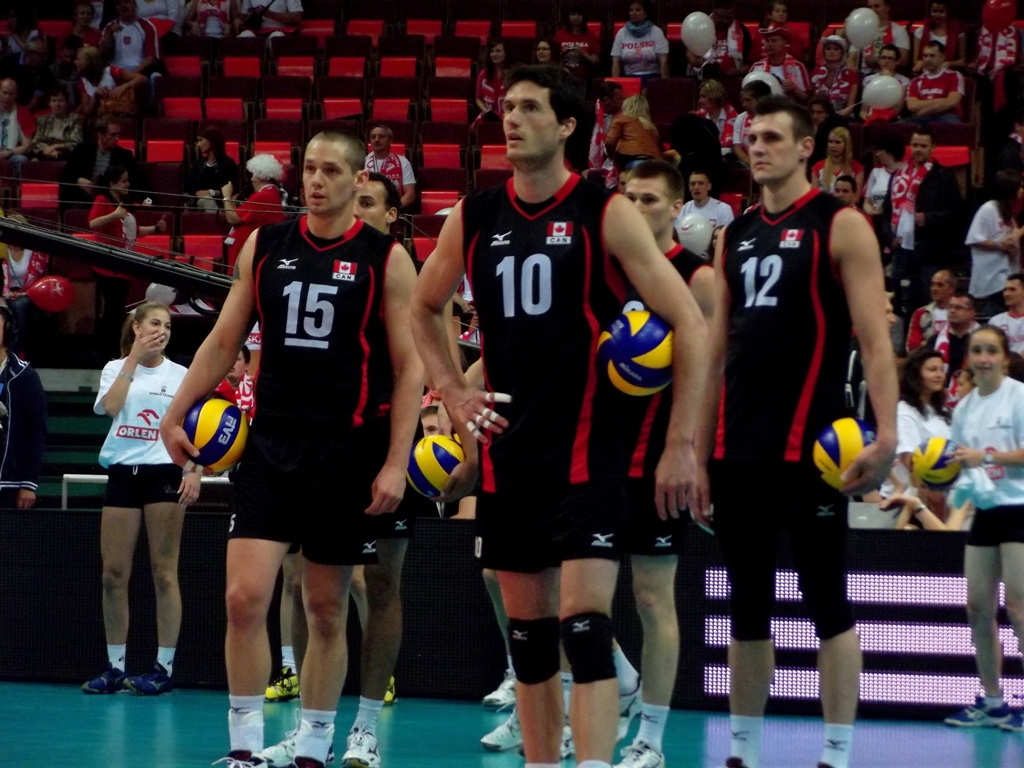
- Toontje Van Lankvelt (center) with Frederic Winters (left) and Gavin Schmitt (right).

Personal information
- Full name: Toontje Adrianus Van Lankvelt
- Nationality: Canadian
- Born: July 1, 1984 (age 42) Rivers, Manitoba
- Home town: Brandon, Manitoba
- Education: University of Manitoba
- Height: 1.97 m (6 ft 6 in)
- Weight: 91 kg (201 lb)
- Spike: 347 cm (137 in)
- Block: 316 cm (124 in)

Volleyball information
- Position: Outside hitter

Career
- Years: Team
- 2002–2007 2007–2008 2008–2009 2009 2010 2010–2011 2011–2012 2012–2013 2014–2015 2015–2016 2016–2017: Manitoba Bisons; Ethnikos Alexandroupolis; Dionysos Stroumpi; Tomis Constanţa; SK Aich/Dob; VC Lennik; PV Cuneo; Nantes-Rezé MVB; ASUL Lyon; Jastrzębski Węgiel; Hyundai Capital

National team
- Years: Team
- 2007–2016: Canada
Honours
Men's volleyball
Representing Canada
NORCECA Championship
Gold medal – first place	2015 Córdoba
Silver medal – second place	2013 Langley
Bronze medal – third place	2011 Mayaguez
Pan American Games
Bronze medal – third place	2015 Toronto	Team
- Updated on 2024-08-01

Toontje Van Lankvelt (born 1 July 1984) is a former Canadian male volleyball player. He was part of the Canada men's national volleyball team at the 2014 FIVB Volleyball Men's World Championship in Poland. He last played for Hyundai Capital in Korea, but has played for a variety of other European teams throughout his professional career.

== Sporting achievements ==
=== Clubs ===
==== National Championships ====
- 2010 Austrian Volley League, with Posoljilnica Aich / Dob
- 2011 Volleyliga Belgium, with VC Lennik

=== National team ===
- 2011 NORCECA Championship
- 2013 NORCECA Championship
- 2015 Pan American Games
- 2015 NORCECA Championship
