= Daniel Lewis (volleyball) =

Canadian volleyball player and coach (born 1976)

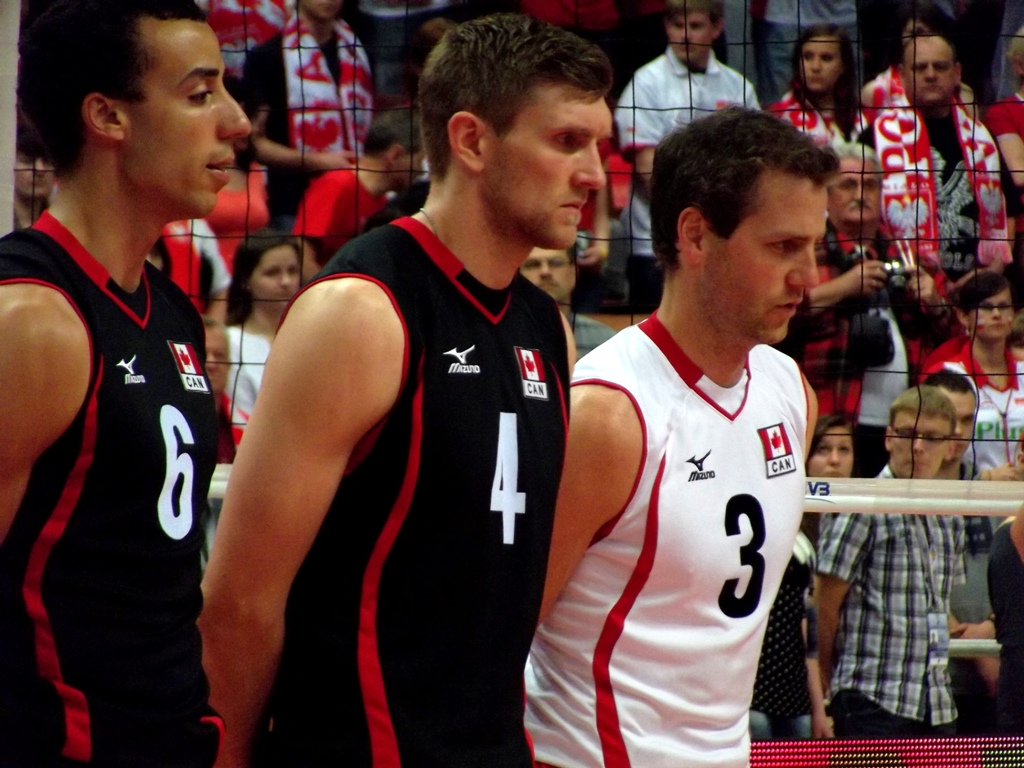

Personal information
- Nickname: Dan
- Born: April 3, 1976 (age 50); Oakville, Ontario, Canada
- Height: 1.90 m (6 ft 3 in)
- Weight: 88 kg (194 lb)
- Spike: 339 cm (133 in)
- Block: 315 cm (124 in)
- Education: University of Manitoba

Coaching information
- Current team: Canada; Stade Poitevin Poitiers
Previous teams coached
Years	Teams
2017; 2024; 2024– 2025–	Canada (AC); Canada U21; Stade Poitevin Poitiers; Canada

Volleyball information
- Position: Libero/Receiver

Career
Years	Teams
1995–2001; 2001–2002; 2002–2003; 2003–2006; 2006–2008; 2008–2009; 2009–2013; 2013–2014; 2014–2015; 2015–2016	Manitoba Bisons; Lausanne UC; Toulouse Volley; Montpellier Volley; PGE Skra Bełchatów; ZAKSA Kędzierzyn-Koźle; ACH Volley; ZAKSA Kędzierzyn-Koźle; Rennes Volley 35; BBTS Bielsko-Biała

National team
2001–2016	Canada
Honours
Men's volleyball
Representing Canada
Pan American Games
Bronze medal – third place	2015 Toronto	Team
NORCECA Championship
Gold medal – first place	2015 Córdoba
Bronze medal – third place	2001 Bridgetown
Bronze medal – third place	2011 Mayaguez
Pan-Am Cup
Bronze medal – third place	2011 Gatineau
- Last updated: 5 July 2025

Daniel Lewis (born April 3, 1976) is a Canadian professional volleyball coach and former player. He currently the head coach of the Canadian men's national team and the French Ligue A club Stade Poitevin Poitiers. He was a libero for Canada's national team when they won bronze at the 2011 NORCECA Championship and 2015 Pan American Games. He also played professionally in Europe for many years and is a double Polish Champion and four-time Slovenian Champion.

== Career ==
Lewis played at the University of Manitoba for the Bisons for five seasons from 1995 to 2001. In the 1995–96 season, he was named the CIAU men's volleyball Rookie of the Year and won the 1996 CIAU championship while being named the Championship MVP. He finished his university career much like how he started it, by winning the CIAU national championship as a member of the Bisons in 2001.

Lewis played beach volleyball at the 1999 Pan American Games, finishing in seventh place alongside Brian Gatzke.

In season 2013/2014, Lewis played for ZAKSA Kędzierzyn-Koźle. ZAKSA, including Lewis, achieved silver medal of Polish Cup. In January 2015 went to French club Rennes Volley 35.

He ended up his sporting career in April 2017.

== Sporting achievements ==
=== University ===
- 1996 CIAU Men's Volleyball Championship, with Manitoba Bisons
- 2001 CIAU Men's Volleyball Championship, with Manitoba Bisons

=== Clubs ===
==== CEV Champions League ====
- 2007/2008 – with Skra Bełchatów

==== National championships ====
- 2006/2007 Polish Cup, with Skra Bełchatów
- 2006/2007 Polish Championship, with Skra Bełchatów
- 2007/2008 Polish Championship, with Skra Bełchatów
- 2009/2010 Slovenian Championship, with ACH Volley
- 2009/2010 Slovenian Cup, with ACH Volley
- 2009/2010 Slovenian Championship, with ACH Volley
- 2010/2011 Slovenian Cup, with ACH Volley
- 2010/2011 Slovenian Championship, with ACH Volley
- 2011/2012 Slovenian Cup, with ACH Volley
- 2011/2012 Slovenian Championship, with ACH Volley
- 2012/2013 Slovenian Cup, with ACH Volley
- 2012/2013 Slovenian Championship, with ACH Volley
- 2013/2014 Polish Cup, with ZAKSA Kędzierzyn-Koźle

=== National team ===
==== NORCECA Championship ====
- 2001 Bridgetown
- 2011 Mayaguez
- 2015 Córdoba

=== Individually ===
- 1996 CIAU Men's Volleyball Championship MVP
- 1995-96 CIAU Men's Volleyball Rookie of the Year
- 2010 CEV Champions League – Best Receiver

Awards
Preceded by (Bulgaria) Plamen Konstantinov	Best Receiver of CEV Champions League; 2009/2010	Succeeded by (Hungary) Péter Veres
