= Fred Winters =

Canadian volleyball player (born 1982)

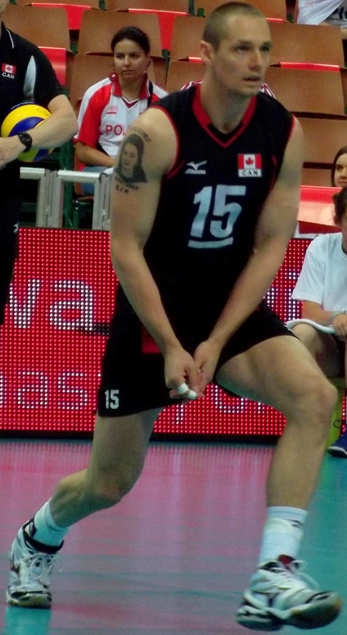
- Winters with Canada in 2012

Personal information
- Full name: Frederic Winters
- Nickname: Fred
- Nationality: Canadian
- Born: September 25, 1982 (age 44); Victoria, British Columbia, Canada
- Height: 1.95 m (6 ft 5 in)
- Weight: 98 kg (216 lb)
- Spike: 359 cm (141 in)
- Block: 327 cm (129 in)
- Education: Pepperdine University

Volleyball information
- Position: Outside hitter

Career
Years	Teams
2000–2004; 2004–2005; 2005–2006; 2006–2007; 2007; 2007–2009; 2009; 2010; 2010–2011; 2011–2012; 2012–2014; 2014–2016; 2016–2017; 2017–2019	Pepperdine Waves; Stade Poitevin Poitiers; Hypo Tirol Innsbruck; Gumi KB Insurance Stars; Sisley Treviso; Yaroslavich Yaroslavl; Halkbank Ankara; Al-Arabi SC; VfB Friedrichshafen; Yaroslavich Yaroslavl; Beijing Volleyball; Sada Cruzeiro; Asseco Resovia Rzeszów; Benfica

National team
2003–2016	Canada
Honours
Men's volleyball
Representing Canada
NORCECA Championship
Gold medal – first place	2015 Córdoba
Silver medal – second place	2013 Langley
Bronze medal – third place	2005 Winnipeg
Bronze medal – third place	2011 Mayagüez
Pan American Games
Bronze medal – third place	2015 Toronto	Team
- Last updated: 17 October 2024

Frederic Winters (born September 25, 1982) is a Canadian professional volleyball player. He was part of the Canada national team at the 2014 FIVB World Championship in Poland.

In July 2016, Winters was named to Canada's 2016 Olympic team.

== Honours ==
=== Club ===
Sada Cruzeiro

- Brazilian Superliga: 2014–15, 2015–16
- FIVB Club World Championship: 2015

Benfica

- Portuguese First Division: 2018–19
- Portuguese Cup: 2017–18, 2018–19
- Portuguese Super Cup: 2018

=== International ===
Canada

- Pan American Games: third place 2015
