= Sebastián Closter =

Argentine volleyball player (born 1989)

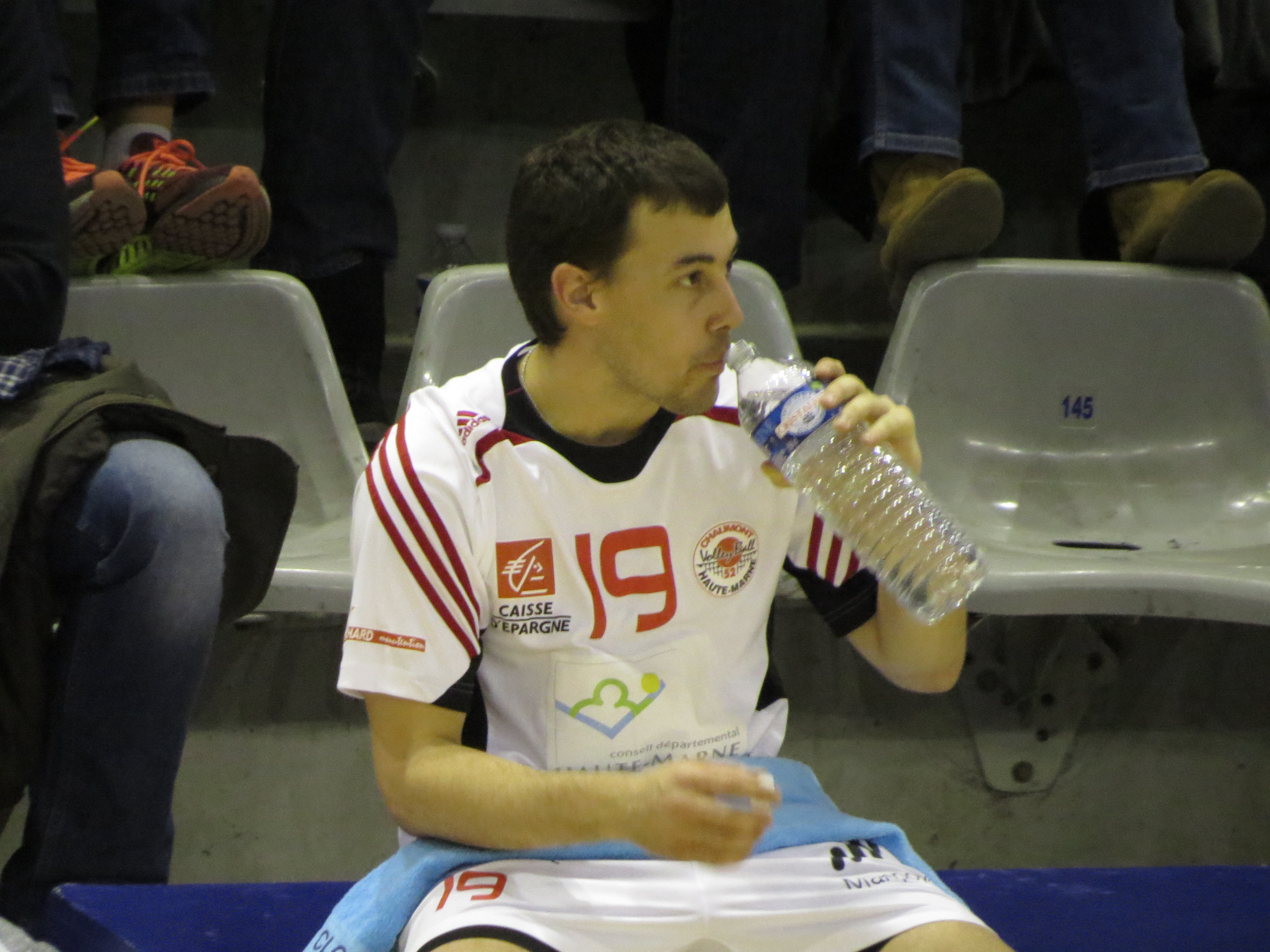

Personal information
- Nationality: Argentine
- Born: 13 May 1989 (age 37)
- Height: 1.73 m (5 ft 8 in)
- Weight: 70 kg (154 lb)
- Spike: 297 cm (117 in)
- Block: 278 cm (109 in)

Volleyball information
- Number: 19

Career
Years	Teams
2014	(Argentina) Club Ciudad de Bolívar

National team
2014	Argentina
Honours
Men's volleyball
Representing Argentina
Pan American Games
Gold medal – first place	2015 Toronto	Team

Sebastián Closter (born 13 May 1989) is an Argentine volleyball player. He was part of the Argentina men's national volleyball team at the 2014 FIVB Volleyball Men's World Championship in Poland. He played with Club Ciudad de Bolívar.

== Clubs ==
- Rosario Sonder (2009–2010)
- Sarmiento de Chaco (2010–2011)
- Sarmiento de Chaco (2011–2012)
- Puerto San Martin (2012–2013)
- Club Ciudad de Bolívar (2013–2014)
- Gigantes del sur-Neuquen (2014–2015)
- Chuamont - Francia (2015–2016)
- Chaumont - Francia (2016–2017)
- Rennes - Francia (2017–2018)
- Spacers Toulouse - Francia (2018 - 2021)
- Saint Nazaire - Francia (2021–2022)
- Montpellier - Francia (2022–2023)
- Chuamont - Francia (2023-Actualidad)

== National team ==
Years-2014

- World League
- World Cup Polonia
- Years-2015
- World League
- Panamerican Games
- Claisficacion to the Japanese Cup
- Japanese Cup
- Classification Olympic Games
