= Steven Marshall (volleyball) =

Canadian volleyball player (born 1989)

Personal information
- Full name: Steven James Douglas Marshall
- Born: 23 November 1989 (age 36); Abbotsford, British Columbia, Canada
- Hometown: Abbotsford, British Columbia
- Height: 1.93 m (6 ft 4 in)
- Weight: 87 kg (192 lb)
- Spike: 350 cm (138 in)
- Block: 322 cm (127 in)
- Education: Trinity Western University

Volleyball information
- Position: Outside hitter
- Current club: CS Arcada Galați

Career
Years	Teams
2008–2013; 2014–2015; 2015–2016; 2016–2018; 2018–2019; 2019–2020; 2020–2021; 2021–2023; 2023–2024; 2024–	Trinity Western Spartans; Łuczniczka Bydgoszcz; SVG Lüneburg; Berlin Volleys; İnegöl Belediye; PAOK Thessaloniki; Chaumont VB 52; Nice VB; Al Faisaly VC; CS Arcada Galați

National team
2014–2021	Canada
Honours
Men's volleyball
Representing Canada
FIVB World League
Bronze medal – third place	2017 Curitiba
NORCECA Championship
Gold medal – first place	2015 Mexico
Pan American Games
Bronze medal – third place	2015 Toronto	Team
- Last updated: 2024-07-29

Steven Marshall (born 23 November 1989) is a Canadian male volleyball player. He was a member of the Canada men's national volleyball team, representing Canada in the 2016 and 2020 Summer Olympics. He was a gold medallist at the NORCECA Men's Volleyball Championship in 2015 and a bronze medallist at the 2015 Pan American Games.

== Personal life ==
Steven was born in Abbotsford, British Columbia to parents Robin and David Marshall. Growing up, Steven was a multi-sport athlete, and at the age of 15 he started playing competitive volleyball.

== Career ==
Steven began his post-secondary volleyball career at Trinity Western University, playing with the Spartans men's volleyball team. He spent four years there, highlighted by winning the CIS national championship in 2012.

Steven first joined the Senior men's national team in 2014, after joining the 'B' team in 2012. He was a member of the squad that finished a national best 7th place at the 2014 FIVB Volleyball Men's World Championship, and helped the team win bronze at both the 2015 NORCECA Championship and Pan American Games.

Steven was a member of the squad that finished 5th at the 2016 Summer Olympics. In June 2021, Marshall was named to Canada's 2020 Olympic team.

== Sporting achievements ==
=== Clubs ===
==== National Championships ====
- 2009/2010 CIS Men's Volleyball Championship, with Trinity Western Spartans
- 2011/2012 CIS Men's Volleyball Championship, with Trinity Western Spartans
- 2016/2017 Volleyball Bundesliga, with Berlin Volleys
- 2017/2018 Volleyball Bundesliga, with Berlin Volleys

=== National team ===
- 2015 Pan American Games
- 2015 NORCECA Championship
- 2017 FIVB World League

=== Individually ===
- 2017 Memorial of Hubert Jerzy Wagner – Best outside spiker
