= TJ Sanders =

Canadian volleyball player (born 1991)

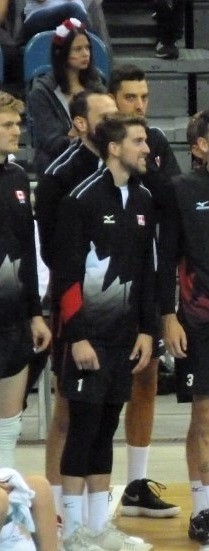
- TJ Sanders in 2018

Personal information
- Full name: Tyler James Sanders
- Nickname: TJ
- Nationality: (Canada) Canadian
- Born: 14 December 1991 (age 34); Winnipeg, Manitoba, Canada
- Hometown: London, Ontario, Canada
- Height: 1.91 m (6 ft 3 in)
- Weight: 81 kg (179 lb)
- Spike: 338 cm (133 in)
- Education: University of Manitoba; McMaster University

Volleyball information
- Position: Setter
- Number: 1

Career
| Years | Teams |
|---|---|
| 2013–2014; 2014–2015; 2015–2016; 2016–2017; 2017–2018; 2019 | (Netherlands) Abiant Lycurgus (Switzerland) PV Lugano (Poland) MKS Będzin (Turkey) Arkas Izmir (Poland) Trefl Gdańsk (Poland) MKS Będzin |

National team
| 2010–2011; 2014–2021 | Canada U21; Canada |
Honours
Representing Canada
Men's volleyball
FIVB World League
| Bronze medal – third place | 2017 Curitiba |
NORCECA Championship
| Gold medal – first place | 2015 Mexico |
Pan-American Games
| Bronze medal – third place | 2015 Toronto |

Tyler James "TJ" Sanders (born 14 December 1991) is a former professional Canadian male volleyball player. He was a member of the Canada men's national volleyball team, representing Canada in the 2016 and 2020 Summer Olympics. He also was a gold medallist at the 2015 NORCECA Championship, and a bronze medalist at the 2015 Pan American Games and a bronze medalist at the 2017 World League where he ranked statistically as the top setter.

== Personal life ==
TJ Sanders was born in Winnipeg, Manitoba to Greg and Cindy Sanders. He began playing volleyball at the age of 12 after watching his older sister Sam play club volleyball. Growing up, he played club volleyball for the Forest City Volleyball Club in London, Ontario. TJ Sanders’ Olympic dream began in 2007 when Volleyball Canada was the host of an FIVB World League event in his hometown.

== Playing career ==
=== Club ===
TJ was a member of the Full Time Training Center roster for the 2012/2013 season. He signed his first professional contract with Abiant Lycurgus in October 2013, making his debut for the club in a 3-1 win over Driasma Dynamo. After a successful first season with the club, in which they finished third in the league, TJ signed with the Swiss club PV Lugano. He spent the 2014/2015 season with the club, finishing the season as Swiss champions. TJ signed with MKS Będzin in the PlusLiga for the 2015/16 season. They finished last in the league, and did not make the playoffs.

For the 2016/17 season, TJ Sanders signed with the Turkish club Arkas Spor.

=== National team ===
TJ Sanders was a member of the Canada men's junior national volleyball team from 2010 to 2011. He helped the team finish second at the 2010 Junior NORCECA Championship, and finish 11th at the 2011 U21 World Championship. As well, TJ helped them place 5th at the 2013 Universiade.

TJ joined the senior men's national team program in 2013 as a member of the men's "B" national team, and in 2014 joined the senior men's roster. He was a member of the squad that finished 7th at the 2014 FIVB Volleyball Men's World Championship, a national team best. In 2015, TJ helped the team win bronze at the Pan American Games, and gold at the 2015 Men's NORCECA Volleyball Championship.

TJ was a member of the squad that finished 5th at the 2016 Summer Olympics. In June 2021, Sanders was named to Canada's 2020 Olympic team.

== Sporting achievements ==
- National championships
  - 2013/2014 Dutch Championship, with Abiant Lycurgus
  - 2014/2015 Swiss Championship, with PV Lugano
  - 2016/2017 Turkish Championship, with Arkas Spor
  - 2017/2018 Polish Championship, with Trefl Gdańsk
  - 2017/2018 Polish Cup, with Trefl Gdańsk
- National team
  - 2010 Junior NORCECA Championship
  - 2011 U-21 Pan American Cup
  - 2015 NORCECA Championship
  - 2015 Pan American Games
  - 2017 FIVB World League
- Others
  - 2022 2022 Puvirnituq Volleyball Championship - Winter Classic
