= Nicholas Hoag =

Canadian volleyball player (born 1992)

Nick Hoag
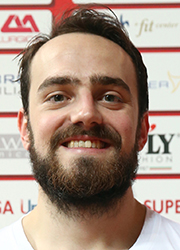
- Hoag in 2016

Personal information
- Full name: Nicholas Hoag
- Nationality: (Canada) Canadian
- Born: 19 August 1992 (age 34); Gatineau, Quebec, Canada
- Hometown: Sherbrooke, Quebec, Canada
- Height: 2.00 m (6 ft 7 in)
- Weight: 97 kg (214 lb)
- Spike: 350 cm (138 in)
- Block: 323 cm (127 in)

Volleyball information
- Position: Outside hitter

Career
| Years | Teams |
|---|---|
| 2013–2015; 2015–2016; 2016–2017; 2017–2018; 2018; 2018–2019; 2019–2020; 2020–2021; 2021–2024 | Tours VB; Paris Volley; Power Volley Milano; Diatec Trentino; Stocznia Szczecin; Sir Safety Perugia; Asseco Resovia; Fenerbahçe S.K. Arkas Spor |

National team
| 2010–2011; 2013– | Canada U21; Canada |
Honours
Men's volleyball
Representing Canada
FIVB World League
| Bronze medal – third place | 2017 Curitiba |
NORCECA Championship
| Gold medal – first place | 2015 Córdoba |
| Silver medal – second place | 2013 Langley |
| Silver medal – second place | 2023 Charleston |
| Bronze medal – third place | 2017 Colorado Springs |
| Bronze medal – third place | 2019 Winnipeg |
Pan American Games
| Bronze medal – third place | 2015 Toronto | Team |

Nicholas Hoag (born 19 August 1992) is a Canadian volleyball player. He is a member of the Canada men's national volleyball team and a participant in the 2016, 2020, and 2024 Summer Olympics.

== Personal life ==
Nick Hoag was born in Gatineau, Quebec to parents Glenn Hoag and Donna Kastelic. His parents both played for the Canadian national volleyball team, with his father Glenn the former coach of the men's national team. Nick's older brother Christopher is also a member of the men's national volleyball program.

== Career ==
=== Club ===
Nick Hoag began his post high-school career by training at the Team Canada Full-time Training Center. In 2013, Nick joined French club Tours VB. Over the two years Nick spent there, he helped the team win both the French Cup and the French League in both seasons. Nick left the club to join Paris Volley for the 2015-16 season. He helped the team win the French League for the 9th time in the club's history.

For the 2016-17 season, Nick signed with Italian club Power Volley Milano. Now he is playing 2020-21 season for Fenerbahce Hdi Sigorta Turkish club.

=== National team ===
Nick was a member of the Canada men's junior national volleyball team from 2010 to 2011. He helped the team finish second at the 2010 Junior NORCECA Championship, and finish 11th at the 2011 U21 World Championship. Nick also helped the team finish 5th at the 2013 Universiade.

Nick joined the Senior men's national team in 2013. He was the youngest member of the squad that finished a national team record 7th at the 2014 FIVB Volleyball Men's World Championship. He helped the team win bronze at the 2015 Pan American Games, silver at the 2013 Men's NORCECA Volleyball Championship, and was the MVP of the 2015 Men's NORCECA Volleyball Championship, helping Canada win gold along the way.

Nick was a member of the squad that finished 5th at the 2016 Summer Olympics. In June 2021, Hoag was named to Canada's 2020 Olympic team.

== Sporting achievements ==
- National championships
  - 2013/2014 French Cup, with Tours VB
  - 2013/2014 French Championship, with Tours VB
  - 2014/2015 French Supercup, with Tours VB
  - 2014/2015 French Cup, with Tours VB
  - 2014/2015 French Championship, with Tours VB
  - 2015/2016 French Championship, with Paris Volley
  - 2018/2019 Italian Cup, with Sir Safety Perugia
  - 2018/2019 Italian Championship, with Sir Safety Perugia
  - 2020/2021 Turkish Supercup, with Fenerbahçe SK
- National team
  - 2010 Junior NORCECA Championship
  - 2011 U-21 Pan Am Cup
  - 2013 NORCECA Championship
  - 2015 Pan American Games
  - 2015 NORCECA Championship
  - 2017 FIVB World League

=== Individually ===
- 2010: NORCECA Championship – Most Valuable Player
- 2011: U-21 Pan Am Cup – Best Spiker
- 2015: NORCECA Championship – Most Valuable Player
- 2015: NORCECA Championship – Best Server
