= 2015 Men's NORCECA Volleyball Championship =

2015 Men's NORCECA Championship

Tournament details
- Host country: Mexico
- City: Córdoba
- Dates: 5–10 October 2023
- Teams: 7
- Venue: 1 (in 1 host city)

Final positions
- Champions: Canada (1st title)
- Runners-up: Cuba
- Third place: Puerto Rico
- Fourth place: Mexico

Tournament awards
- MVP: (Canada) Nicholas Hoag
- Best Setter: Pedro Rangel (MEX)
- Best OH: Gord Perrin (CAN); Jorge Barajas (MEX)
- Best MB: Luis Sosa (CUB); Daniel Jansen Vandoorn (CAN)
- Best OPP: Rolando Cepeda (CUB)
- Best Libero: Dennis Del Valle (PUR)

Tournament statistics
- Matches played: 17
- Best scorer: Richard Smith Hall (CRC) (89 points)
- Best server: Nicholas Hoag (CAN) (0.73 Avg)
- Best digger: Dennis Del Valle (PUR) (3.44 Avg)
- Best receiver: Yonder García (CUB) (78.87%)

The 2015 Men's NORCECA Volleyball Championship was the 24th edition of the tournament, played from 5 to 10 October 2015 in Córdoba, Mexico. The top 4 teams who had not yet qualified from the 2016 Summer Olympics automatically qualified to the NORCECA Olympic Qualifier.

== Competing nations ==
The following national teams have qualified:

Pool A	Pool B
~~United States~~ *withdrew	Mexico
Canada	Cuba
Puerto Rico	Costa Rica
Honduras	Trinidad and Tobago

== Pool standing procedure ==
1. Number of matches won
2. Match points
3. Points ratio
4. Sets ratio
5. Result of the last match between the tied teams

Match won 3–0: 5 match points for the winner, 0 match points for the loser
Match won 3–1: 4 match points for the winner, 1 match point for the loser
Match won 3–2: 3 match points for the winner, 2 match points for the loser

== Preliminary round ==
=== Pool A ===
Pos	Team	Pld	W	L	Pts	SPW	SPL	SPR	SW	SL	SR	Qualification
1	Canada	2	2	0	10	150	96	1.563	6	0	MAX	Semifinals
2	Puerto Rico	2	1	1	5	138	123	1.122	3	3	1.000	Quarterfinals
3	Honduras	2	0	2	0	81	150	0.540	0	6	0.000	Quarterfinals

Source: norceca.net

Date	Time		Score		Set 1	Set 2	Set 3	Set 4	Set 5	Total	Report
5 Oct	18:00	Canada	3–0	Honduras	25–13	25–10	25–10			75–33	P2 P3
6 Oct	18:00	Honduras	0–3	Puerto Rico	16–25	19–25	13–25			48–75	P2 P3
7 Oct	18:00	Puerto Rico	0–3	Canada	23–25	17–25	23–25			63–75	P2 P3

=== Pool B ===
Pos	Team	Pld	W	L	Pts	SPW	SPL	SPR	SW	SL	SR	Qualification
1	Cuba	3	3	0	15	225	130	1.731	9	0	MAX	Semifinals
2	Mexico	3	2	1	10	199	193	1.031	6	3	2.000	Quarterfinals
3	Costa Rica	3	1	2	4	198	237	0.835	3	7	0.429	Quarterfinals
4	Trinidad and Tobago	3	0	3	1	183	245	0.747	1	9	0.111	6th–7th classification

Source: norceca.net

Date	Time		Score		Set 1	Set 2	Set 3	Set 4	Set 5	Total	Report
5 Oct	14:00	Cuba	3–0	Costa Rica	25–14	25–13	25–18			75–45	P2 P3
5 Oct	21:00	Mexico	3–0	Trinidad and Tobago	25–22	25–16	25–22			75–60	P2 P3
6 Oct	14:00	Trinidad and Tobago	0–3	Cuba	11–25	13–25	12–25			36–75	P2 P3
6 Oct	20:00	Mexico	3–0	Costa Rica	25–21	25–18	25–19			75–58	P2 P3
7 Oct	14:00	Costa Rica	3–1	Trinidad and Tobago	20–25	25–18	25–23	25–21		95–87	P2 P3
7 Oct	20:00	Mexico	0–3	Cuba	18–25	17–25	14–25			49–75	P2 P3

== Final round ==
Quarterfinals
8 October
Mexico	3
Honduras	0
8 October
Puerto Rico	3
Costa Rica	0

Semifinals
9 October
Canada	3
Mexico	2
9 October
Cuba	3
Puerto Rico	1

Final
10 October
Canada	3
Cuba	1
3rd place
10 October
Mexico	0
Puerto Rico	3

=== Quarterfinals ===
Date	Time		Score		Set 1	Set 2	Set 3	Set 4	Set 5	Total	Report
8 Oct	18:00	Puerto Rico	3–0	Costa Rica	25–17	25–19	25–19			75–55	P2 P3
8 Oct	20:00	Mexico	3–0	Honduras	25–20	25–13	25–22			75–55	P2 P3

=== Fifth place match ===
Date	Time		Score		Set 1	Set 2	Set 3	Set 4	Set 5	Total	Report
9 Oct	14:00	Costa Rica	2–3	Honduras	23–25	25–20	25–23	21–25	6–15	100–108	P2 P3

=== Semifinals ===
Date	Time		Score		Set 1	Set 2	Set 3	Set 4	Set 5	Total	Report
9 Oct	18:00	Cuba	3–1	Puerto Rico	20–25	25–20	25–23	25–22		95–90	P2 P3
9 Oct	20:00	Canada	3–2	Mexico	20–25	25–16	18–25	25–17	15–7	103–90	P2 P3

=== Sixth place match ===
Date	Time		Score		Set 1	Set 2	Set 3	Set 4	Set 5	Total	Report
10 Oct	14:00	Trinidad and Tobago	3–0	Costa Rica	27–25	25–13	25–23			77–61	P2 P3

=== Bronze medal match ===
Date	Time		Score		Set 1	Set 2	Set 3	Set 4	Set 5	Total	Report
10 Oct	18:00	Mexico	0–3	Puerto Rico	23–25	21–25	19–25			63–75	P2 P3

=== Final ===
Date	Time		Score		Set 1	Set 2	Set 3	Set 4	Set 5	Total	Report
10 Oct	20:00	Cuba	1–3	Canada	23–25	25–19	18–25	17–25		83–94	P2 P3

== Final standing ==
Rank	Team
1st place, gold medalist(s)	Canada
2nd place, silver medalist(s)	Cuba
3rd place, bronze medalist(s)	Puerto Rico
4	Mexico
5	Honduras
6	Trinidad and Tobago
7	Costa Rica

Qualified for the 2016 North American Olympic Qualifier

2015 Men's NORCECA champions

Canada
1st title

== Awards ==
The following players won individual awards for their performance during the tournament.

- Most valuable player

Nicholas Hoag (CAN)

- Best setter

Pedro Rangel (MEX)

- Best outside hitters

Gord Perrin (CAN)
Jorge Barajas (MEX)

- Best middle blockers

Luis Sosa (CUB)
Daniel Jansen Vandoorn (CAN)

- Best opposite

Rolando Cepeda (CUB)

- Best libero

Dennis Del Valle (PUR)

- Best scorer

Richard Smith Hall (CRC)

- Best server

Nicholas Hoag (CAN)

- Best digger

Dennis Del Valle (PUR)

- Best receiver

Yonder García (CUB)
