= 2022 FIVB Men's Volleyball Challenger Cup qualification =

The 2022 FIVB Volleyball Men's Challenger Cup qualification was a series of tournaments to decide teams which played in the 2022 FIVB Volleyball Men's Challenger Cup. The 2022 Challenger Cup featured 8 teams. Only one place was allocated to the hosts. The remaining 7 places were determined by a qualification process, in which entrants from among the other teams from the five FIVB confederations competed.

== Qualification summary ==
A total of 8 teams qualified for the tournament.

Country	Confederation	Qualified as	Qualified on	Previous appearances			Previous best performance
Country	Confederation	Qualified as	Qualified on	Total	First	Last	Previous best performance
Turkey	CEV	2021 European Golden League champions	20 June 2021	1	2019		4th place (2019)
Qatar	AVC	1st World ranked team from AVC	31 March 2022	0	None		None
Tunisia	CAVB	1st World ranked team from CAVB	31 March 2022	0	None		None
Chile	CSV	1st World ranked team from CSV	31 March 2022	2	2018	2019	5th place (2018)
Cuba	NORCECA	1st World ranked team from NORCECA	31 March 2022	2	2018	2019	Runners-up (2019)
South Korea	AVC	Host country	8 April 2022	0	None		None
Czech Republic	CEV	2022 European Golden League champions	18 June 2022	1	2018		Runners-up (2018)
Australia	AVC	2022 Nations League last placed challenger team	10 July 2022	0	None		None

== Means of qualification ==
Qualified for the 2022 Challenger Cup

== Continental qualification tournaments ==
=== AVC (Asia and Oceania) ===
FIVB selected Qatar to represent the AVC for the 2022 Challenger Cup via the FIVB World Ranking as of 31 March 2022.

Rank	Team
1	Qatar

=== CAVB (Africa) ===
FIVB selected Tunisia to represent the CAVB for the 2022 Challenger Cup via the FIVB World Ranking as of 31 March 2022.

Rank	Team
1	Tunisia

=== CEV (Europe) ===
- Final venue: SC Lange Munte, Kortrijk, Belgium
- Date: 28 May – 20 June 2021
- The top team qualified for the 2022 Challenger Cup.

Rank	Team
1st place, gold medalist(s)	Turkey
2nd place, silver medalist(s)	Ukraine
3rd place, bronze medalist(s)	Estonia
4	Belgium
5	Belarus
5	Romania
7	Czech Republic
7	Slovakia
7	Spain
10	Latvia
10	Portugal
12	Denmark
13	North Macedonia
14	Hungary
15	Croatia
16	Austria
16	Israel
18	Cyprus
18	Luxembourg

- Final venue: Varaždin Arena, Varaždin, Croatia
- Date: 25 May – 19 June 2022
- The top team qualified for the 2022 Challenger Cup.

Rank	Team
1st place, gold medalist(s)	Czech Republic
2nd place, silver medalist(s)	Turkey
3rd place, bronze medalist(s)	Croatia
4	Ukraine
5	Estonia
5	Portugal
7	Belgium
7	Slovakia
7	Spain
10	Denmark
10	Latvia
12	Romania
13	Finland
14	North Macedonia
15	Hungary
16	Albania
17	Bosnia and Herzegovina

=== CSV (South America) ===
FIVB selected Chile to represent the CSV for the 2022 Challenger Cup via the FIVB World Ranking as of 31 March 2022.

Rank	Team
1	Chile

=== NORCECA (North, Central America and Caribbean) ===
FIVB selected Cuba to represent the NORCECA for the 2022 Challenger Cup via the FIVB World Ranking as of 31 March 2022.

Rank	Team
1	Cuba
