= 2023 FIVB Volleyball Men's Challenger Cup qualification (NORCECA) =

The North American section of the 2023 FIVB Volleyball Men's Challenger Cup qualification acted as a qualifier for the 2023 FIVB Volleyball Men's Challenger Cup, for national teams which are members of the North, Central America and Caribbean Volleyball Confederation (NORCECA). The tournament was held in Pinar del Río, Cuba from 3 to 5 June 2022. The winners Cuba qualified for the 2023 Challenger Cup. But, as Cuba later won the 2022 FIVB Volleyball Men's Challenger Cup and qualified for the 2023 FIVB Volleyball Men's Nations League, the runners-up Dominican Republic succeeded to the 2023 Challenger Cup qualification.

== Qualification ==
The hosts Cuba and the top three ranked teams from the NORCECA Ranking as of 1 January 2022 not yet participating in the 2022 Nations League qualified for the tournament. Rankings are shown in brackets except the hosts who ranked 3rd.

- Cuba (Hosts)
- Puerto Rico (4)
- Mexico (5)
- Dominican Republic (6)

== Venue ==
- Sala 19 de Noviembre, Pinar del Río, Cuba

== Pool standing procedure ==
1. Number of matches won
2. Match points
3. Sets ratio
4. Points ratio
5. Result of the last match between the tied teams

Match won 3–0: 5 match points for the winner, 0 match points for the loser
Match won 3–1: 4 match points for the winner, 1 match point for the loser
Match won 3–2: 3 match points for the winner, 2 match points for the loser

== Round robin ==
- All times are Cuba Daylight Time (UTC−04:00).

Pos	Team	Pld	W	L	Pts	SPW	SPL	SPR	SW	SL	SR
1	Cuba	3	3	0	15	225	160	1.406	9	0	MAX
2	Dominican Republic	3	2	1	6	267	287	0.930	6	7	0.857
3	Mexico	3	1	2	5	261	298	0.876	5	8	0.625
4	Puerto Rico	3	0	3	4	277	285	0.972	4	9	0.444

Date	Time		Score		Set 1	Set 2	Set 3	Set 4	Set 5	Total	Report
3 Jun	19:53	Cuba	3–0	Dominican Republic	25–16	25–13	25–23			75–52	P2 P3
3 Jun	22:17	Puerto Rico	2–3	Mexico	24–26	25–21	24–26	25–15	15–17	113–105	P2 P3
4 Jun	17:30	Puerto Rico	2–3	Dominican Republic	23–25	25–16	22–25	25–23	14–16	109–105	P2 P3
4 Jun	21:00	Mexico	0–3	Cuba	15–25	21–25	17–25			53–75	P2 P3
5 Jun	16:00	Dominican Republic	3–2	Mexico	25–22	23–25	25–22	22–25	15–9	110–103	P2 P3
5 Jun	20:28	Cuba	3–0	Puerto Rico	25–18	25–16	25–21			75–55	P2 P3

== Final standing ==
Rank	Team
1	Cuba
2	Dominican Republic
3	Mexico
4	Puerto Rico

Qualified for the 2023 Challenger Cup
Later qualified for the 2023 Nations League via the 2022 Challenger Cup
