= 2023 FIVB Men's Volleyball Challenger Cup =

International volleyball tournament

Tournament details
- Host country: Qatar
- City: Doha
- Dates: 28–30 July
- Teams: 8 (from 5 confederations)
- Venue: 1 (in 1 host city)

Final positions
- Champions: Turkey (1st title)
- Runners-up: Qatar
- Third place: Ukraine
- Fourth place: Chile

Tournament statistics
- Matches played: 8
- Attendance: 7,700 (963 per match)
- Best scorer: (Chile) Vicente Parraguirre (67 points)
- Best spiker: (Chile) Vicente Parraguirre (50.00%)
- Best blocker: (Qatar) Mohamed Ibrahim Ibrahim (3.00 Avg)
- Best server: (Turkey) Efe Bayram (2.33 Avg)
- Best setter: (Turkey) Arslan Ekşi (25.00 Avg)
- Best digger: (Ukraine) Oleksandr Boiko (11.33 Avg)
- Best receiver: (Ukraine) Oleh Plotnytskyi (45.16%)

The 2023 FIVB Men's Volleyball Challenger Cup was the fourth edition of the FIVB Men's Volleyball Challenger Cup, an annual men's international volleyball tournament contested by eight national teams that acts as a qualifier for the FIVB Men's Volleyball Nations League. The tournament was held at Aspire Ladies Sports Hall in Doha, Qatar, between 28 and 30 July 2023.

Four teams made their first appearance in the men's Challenger Cup in this edition: China, the Dominican Republic, Thailand and Ukraine.

Turkey won the title, defeating host Qatar in the final, and earned the right to participate in 2024 Nations League replacing China, the last placed challenger team in the 2023 edition. Ukraine defeated Chile in the 3rd place match.

== Qualification ==
A total of 8 teams qualified for the tournament.

Country	Confederation	Qualified as	Qualified on	Previous appearances			Previous best performance
Country	Confederation	Qualified as	Qualified on	Total	First	Last	Previous best performance
Tunisia	CAVB	Highest ranked in CAVB	—N/a	1	2022		6th place (2022)
Chile	CSV	Highest ranked in CSV	—N/a	3	2018	2022	5th place (2018)
Qatar	AVC	Host country	1 June 2023	1	2022		7th place (2022)
Dominican Republic	NORCECA	North American Qualifier runners-up (Note: Cuba, the winners of the competition has already participated in the 2023 Nations League.)	31 July 2022	0	None		None
Turkey	CEV	2023 European Golden League champions	24 June 2023	2	2019	2022	Runners-up (2022)
Ukraine	CEV	2023 European Golden League runners-up	24 June 2023	0	None		None
China	AVC	2023 Nations League last placed challenger team	10 July 2023	0	None		None
Thailand	AVC	2023 Asian Challenge Cup champions	15 July 2023	0	None		None

== Format ==
The tournament will compete in the knock-out format (quarterfinals, semifinals, and final), with the host country (Qatar) playing its quarterfinal match against the lowest ranked team. The remaining six teams are placed from 2nd to 7th positions as per the FIVB World Ranking as of 15 July 2023. Rankings are shown in brackets except the host.

Match	Top ranker	Bottom ranker
Quarterfinal 1	Qatar (Hosts)	Thailand (58)
Quarterfinal 2	Turkey (12)	Dominican Republic (31)
Quarterfinal 3	Ukraine (13)	China (25)
Quarterfinal 4	Tunisia (18)	Chile (24)

== Venue ==
All matches
Doha, Qatar
Aspire Ladies Sports Hall
Capacity: 2,500
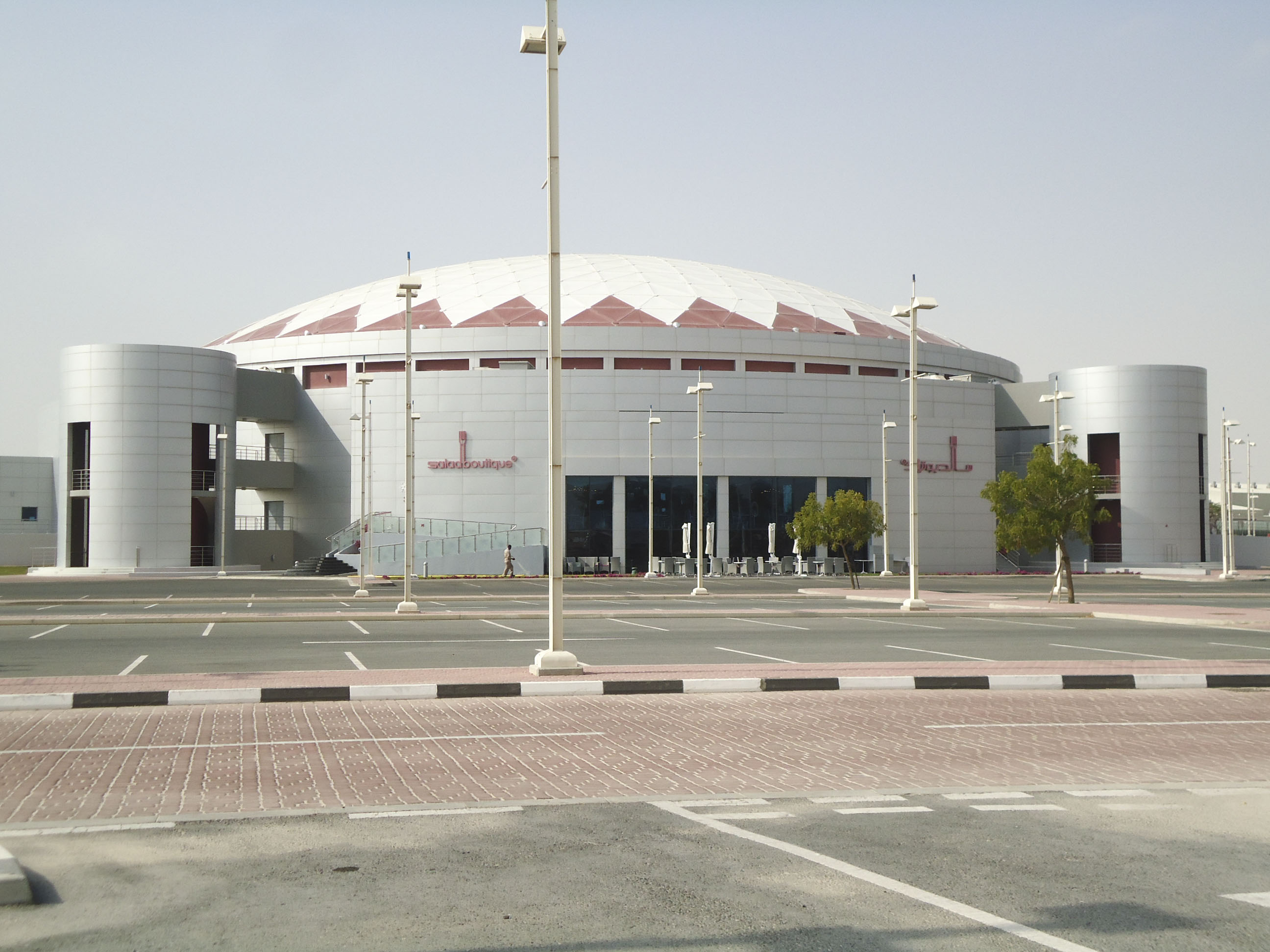

== Knockout stage ==
- All times are Arabia Standard Time (UTC+03:00).

Quarterfinals
28 July
Qatar	3
Thailand	0
28 July
Tunisia	0
Chile	3
28 July
Turkey	3
Dominican Republic	1
28 July
Ukraine	3
China	1

Semifinals
29 July
Qatar	3
Chile	0
29 July
Turkey	3
Ukraine	2

Final
30 July
Qatar	2
Turkey	3
3rd place match
30 July
Chile	0
Ukraine	3

=== Quarterfinals ===
Date	Time		Score		Set 1	Set 2	Set 3	Set 4	Set 5	Total	Report
28 Jul	11:00	Tunisia	0–3	Chile	19–25	23–25	23–25			65–75	P2 Report
28 Jul	14:00	Ukraine	3–1	China	25–19	25–22	23–25	25–19		98–85	P2 Report
28 Jul	17:00	Qatar	3–0	Thailand	26–24	25–23	26–24			77–71	P2 Report
28 Jul	20:00	Turkey	3–1	Dominican Republic	25–20	25–17	24–26	25–19		99–82	P2 Report

=== Semifinals ===
Date	Time		Score		Set 1	Set 2	Set 3	Set 4	Set 5	Total	Report
29 Jul	16:00	Turkey	3–2	Ukraine	18–25	25–23	25–17	19–25	15–13	102–103	P2 Report
29 Jul	19:00	Qatar	3–0	Chile	25–21	25–22	27–25			77–68	P2 Report

=== 3rd place match ===
Date	Time		Score		Set 1	Set 2	Set 3	Set 4	Set 5	Total	Report
30 Jul	16:00	Chile	0–3	Ukraine	21–25	19–25	18–25			58–75	P2 Report

=== Final ===
Date	Time		Score		Set 1	Set 2	Set 3	Set 4	Set 5	Total	Report
30 Jul	19:00	Qatar	2–3	Turkey	13–25	25–21	18–25	25–22	9–15	90–108	P2 Report

== Final standing ==
Rank	Team
1st place, gold medalist(s)	Turkey
2nd place, silver medalist(s)	Qatar
3rd place, bronze medalist(s)	Ukraine
4	Chile
5	China
6	Dominican Republic
7	Thailand
8	Tunisia

Qualified for the 2024 Nations League

Source: VCC 2023 final standings

2023 Men's Challenger Cup champions

Turkey
1st title

14–man Roster
Kaan Gürbüz, Arda Bostan, Bedirhan Bülbül, Burutay Subaşı, Mirza Lagumdžija, Arslan Ekşi (c), Adis Lagumdžija, Faik Samet Güneş, Mert Matić, Berkay Bayraktar, Efe Bayram, Enes Atlı, Volkan Döne, Vahit Emre Savaş
Head coach
Alberto Giuliani

== See also ==
- 2023 FIVB Men's Volleyball Nations League
- 2023 FIVB Women's Volleyball Challenger Cup
