= 2019 FIVB Men's Volleyball Challenger Cup qualification =

The 2019 FIVB Men's Volleyball Challenger Cup qualification was a series of tournaments held to decide which teams would play in the 2019 FIVB Men's Volleyball Challenger Cup. The 2019 Challenger Cup featured 6 teams. Only one place was allocated to the hosts. The remaining 5 places were determined by a qualification process, in which entrants from among the other teams from the five FIVB confederations competed.

== Qualification summary ==
A total of 6 teams qualified for the tournament.

Country	Confederation	Qualified as	Qualified on	Previous appearances			Previous best performance
Country	Confederation	Qualified as	Qualified on	Total	First	Last	Previous best performance
Slovenia	CEV	Host country	December 2018	0	None		None
Cuba	NORCECA	North American Qualifier winners	1 June 2019	1	2018		4th place (2018)
Egypt	CAVB	1st World ranked team from CAVB	12 June 2019	0	None		None
Chile^{1}	CSV	2019 Pan-American Cup best finishing team from CSV	21 June 2019	1	2018		5th place (2018)
Belarus	CEV	2019 European Golden League runners-up	21 June 2019	0	None		None
Turkey	CEV	2019 European Golden League champions	21 June 2019	0	None		None

1. Originally, the representatives from AVC and CSV would play a playoff for a spot. But, South Korea, chosen by FIVB, refused to represent the AVC. So the AVC–CSV playoff was canceled and the representatives from CSV booked a direct qualification.

== Means of qualification ==
Qualified for the 2019 Challenger Cup

== Continental qualification tournaments ==
=== AVC (Asia and Oceania) ===
FIVB selected South Korea to represent the AVC for the 2019 Challenger Cup via the FIVB World Ranking as of 1 October 2018 because less than 4 teams have registered to participate in the qualifier. But, South Korea refused to participate. So the AVC–CSV playoff was canceled and the representatives from CSV directly qualified for the 2019 Challenger Cup.

=== CAVB (Africa) ===
FIVB selected a team to represent the CAVB for the 2019 Challenger Cup via the FIVB World Ranking as of 1 October 2018 because CAVB did not host the qualifier.

Rank	Team
1	Egypt

=== CEV (Europe) ===
- Final venue: Saku Suurhall, Tallinn, Estonia
- Dates: 25 May – 22 June 2019
- The top two teams qualified for the 2019 Challenger Cup.

Rank	Team
1st place, gold medalist(s)	Turkey
2nd place, silver medalist(s)	Belarus
3rd place, bronze medalist(s)	Netherlands
4	Estonia
5	Latvia
5	Spain
5	Ukraine
8	Croatia
8	Czech Republic
8	Slovakia
11	Belgium
11	Finland

=== CSV (South America) ===
- Venue: Auditorio Multifuncional de Colima, Colima City, Mexico
- Dates: 16–21 June 2019
- The best South American team not yet participating in the 2019 Nations League qualified for the 2019 Challenger Cup.

Rank	Team
1st place, gold medalist(s)	Cuba
2nd place, silver medalist(s)	Argentina
3rd place, bronze medalist(s)	Mexico
4	Chile
5	United States
6	Puerto Rico
7	Canada
8	Peru
9	Dominican Republic
10	Guatemala
11	Trinidad and Tobago
12	Suriname

=== NORCECA (North America) ===
- Venue: Coliseo de la Ciudad Deportiva, Havana, Cuba
- Dates: 30 May – 1 June 2019
- The winners qualified for the 2019 Challenger Cup.

Rank	Team
1	Cuba
2	Puerto Rico
3	Mexico
