= Paweł Zatorski =

Polish volleyball player (born 1990)

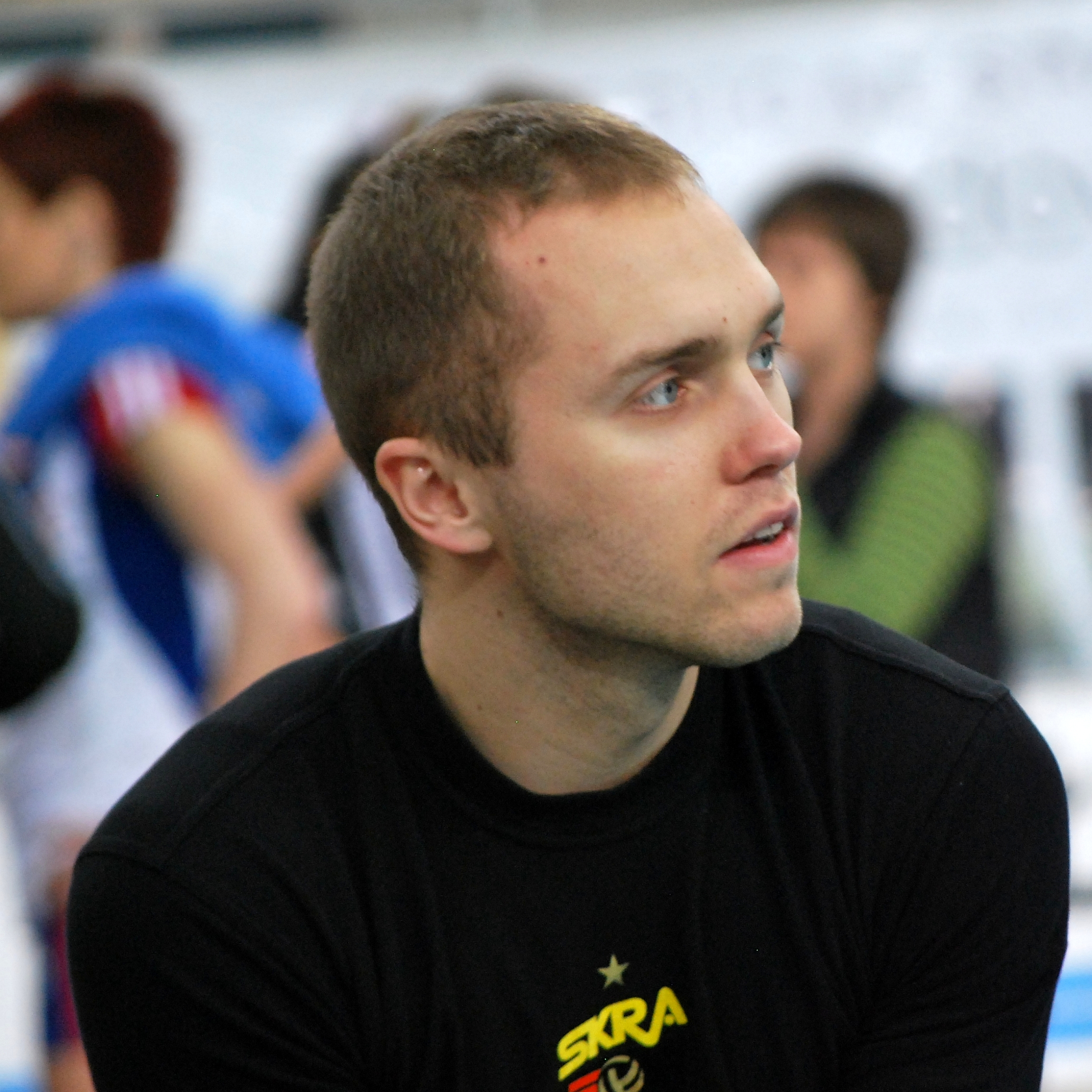
- Zatorski in 2013

Personal information
- Nickname: Zati, Duracell
- Born: 21 June 1990 (age 36); Łódź, Poland
- Height: 1.84 m (6 ft 0 in)
- Weight: 73 kg (161 lb)

Volleyball information
- Position: Libero
- Current club: Asseco Resovia
- Number: 16

Career
| Years | Teams |
|---|---|
| 2008–2010; 2010–2014; 2014–2021; 2021– | AZS Częstochowa; Skra Bełchatów; ZAKSA Kędzierzyn-Koźle; Asseco Resovia |

National team
| 2009–2024 | Poland (276) |
Honours
Men's volleyball
Representing Poland
Olympic Games
| Silver medal – second place | 2024 Paris | Team |
FIVB World Championship
| Gold medal – first place | 2014 Poland |
| Gold medal – first place | 2018 Bulgaria/Italy |
| Silver medal – second place | 2022 Poland/Slovenia |
FIVB World Cup
| Silver medal – second place | 2011 Japan |
| Silver medal – second place | 2019 Japan |
| Bronze medal – third place | 2015 Japan |
FIVB World League
| Gold medal – first place | 2012 Sofia |
| Bronze medal – third place | 2011 Gdańsk |
FIVB Nations League
| Gold medal – first place | 2023 Gdańsk |
| Silver medal – second place | 2021 Rimini |
| Bronze medal – third place | 2022 Bologna |
| Bronze medal – third place | 2024 Łódź |
CEV European Championship
| Gold medal – first place | 2023 Italy/Bulgaria/North Macedonia/Israel |
| Bronze medal – third place | 2011 Austria/Czech Republic |
| Bronze medal – third place | 2019 Belgium/France/Netherlands/Slovenia |
| Bronze medal – third place | 2021 Poland/Czechia/Estonia/Finland |

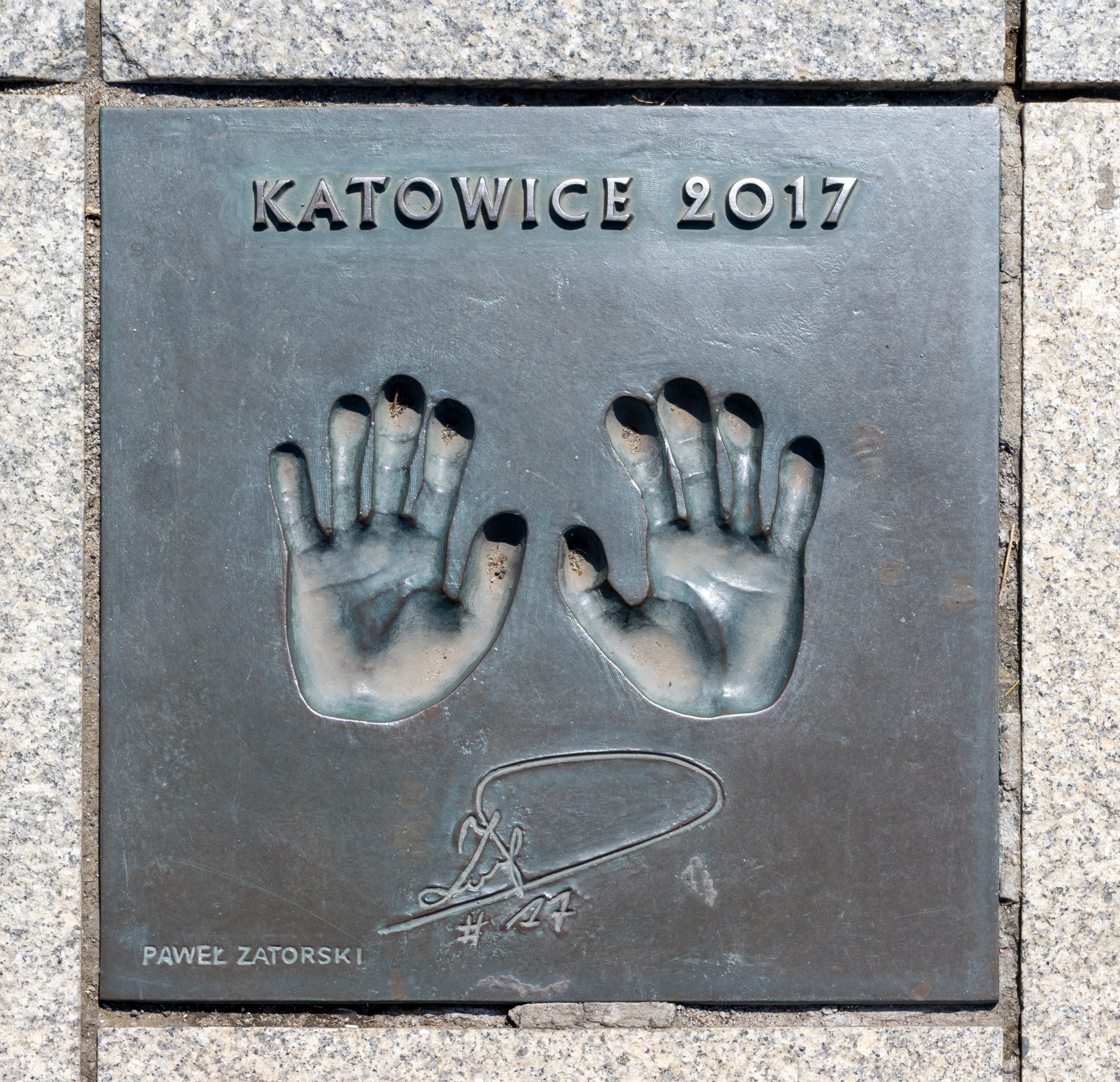
Hand prints and signature at the Avenue of Volleyball Stars, Katowice

Paweł Zatorski (born 21 June 1990) is a Polish professional volleyball player who plays as a libero for Asseco Resovia. Zatorski is a former member of the Poland national team; he took part in 3 Olympic Games (Rio 2016, Tokyo 2020 and Paris 2024, winning a silver medal at the latter), and is a two–time World Champion (2014, 2018) and the 2021 Champions League winner with ZAKSA.

== Personal life ==
On 10 September 2016, he married Agnieszka Ludkiewicz. In February 2017, he graduated from the Academy of Management and Administration in Opole with master's degree in sports marketing. On 9 August 2017, their son Samuel was born. On 4 July 2019, his second child, a son Maksymilian was born.

== Career ==
=== Club ===
Zatorski is an alumnus of Skra Bełchatów. He represented the second team of the club from Bełchatów. In that time, he won two titles of the Polish Champion (as a cadet and junior). In 2008, he moved to AZS Częstochowa and debuted in the top Polish volleyball league – PlusLiga. In 2010, he returned to PGE Skra Bełchatów. He spent four seasons in Skra, winning two medals of the Club World Championship – silver in 2010 and bronze in 2012, silver medal of the Champions League, two Polish Cups (2011, 2012), and two Polish Champion titles in 2011 and 2014. On 6 May 2014, it was officially announced that Zatorski had signed a contract with ZAKSA Kędzierzyn-Koźle for the next two seasons. On 26 April 2016, he won his third title of the Polish Champion, this time with ZAKSA. On 2 May 2016, it was announced that Zatorski extended his contract for the next two seasons (until 2018).

=== National team ===
On 8 July 2012, Zatorski won a gold medal of the 2012 World League in Sofia, Bulgaria. On 16 August 2014, Zatorski was chosen to represent his national team at the World Championship held in Poland. On 21 September 2014, he won a title of the World Champion. On 27 October 2014, he received a state award granted by the Polish president of that time, Bronisław Komorowski – Gold Cross of Merit for outstanding sports achievements and worldwide promotion of Poland.

On 30 September 2018, Poland achieved its third title of the World Champion. Poland beat Brazil in the final (3–0), and defended the title from 2014. Zatorski received an individual award for the Best Libero of the tournament.

On 10 August 2024, he won the silver medal at the 2024 Summer Olympic Games in Paris.

== Honours ==
=== Club ===
- CEV Champions League
  - 2011–12 – with PGE Skra Bełchatów
  - 2020–21 – with ZAKSA Kędzierzyn-Koźle
- FIVB Club World Championship
  - Doha 2010 – with PGE Skra Bełchatów
- CEV Cup
  - 2023–24 – with Asseco Resovia
  - 2024–25 – with Asseco Resovia
- Domestic
  - 2010–11 Polish Cup, with PGE Skra Bełchatów
  - 2010–11 Polish Championship, with PGE Skra Bełchatów
  - 2011–12 Polish Cup, with PGE Skra Bełchatów
  - 2012–13 Polish SuperCup, with PGE Skra Bełchatów
  - 2013–14 Polish Championship, with PGE Skra Bełchatów
  - 2015–16 Polish Championship, with ZAKSA Kędzierzyn-Koźle
  - 2016–17 Polish Cup, with ZAKSA Kędzierzyn-Koźle
  - 2016–17 Polish Championship, with ZAKSA Kędzierzyn-Koźle
  - 2018–19 Polish Championship, with ZAKSA Kędzierzyn-Koźle
  - 2018–19 Polish Cup, with ZAKSA Kędzierzyn-Koźle
  - 2019–20 Polish SuperCup, with ZAKSA Kędzierzyn-Koźle
  - 2020–21 Polish SuperCup, with ZAKSA Kędzierzyn-Koźle
  - 2020–21 Polish Cup, with ZAKSA Kędzierzyn-Koźle

=== Youth national team ===
- 2007 CEV U19 European Championship

=== Individual awards ===
- 2010: FIVB Club World Championship – Best libero
- 2011: Polish Cup – Best defender
- 2012: Polish Cup – Best defender
- 2015: FIVB World League – Best libero
- 2016: Polish Cup – Best defender
- 2018: FIVB World Championship – Best libero
- 2019: Polish Cup – Best defender
- 2023: FIVB Nations League – Most valuable player
- 2023: FIVB Nations League – Best libero

=== State awards ===
- 2014: Gold Cross of Merit
- 2018: Knight's Cross of Polonia Restituta
- 2024: Officer's Cross of Polonia Restituta

=== Statistics ===
- 2014–15 PlusLiga – Best receiver
- 2015–16 PlusLiga – Best receiver

Awards
| Preceded by (France) Jenia Grebennikov | Best Libero of FIVB World Championship; 2018 | Succeeded by (Italy) Fabio Balaso |
