= FIVB Men's Volleyball Nations League =

International men's volleyball competition for national teams

- Most recent season or competition: 2026 FIVB Men's Volleyball Nations League
- VNL logo
- Sport: Volleyball
- Founded: 2017; 9 years ago
- First season: 2018
- CEO: Ary Graça
- No. of teams: 18
- Continent: International (FIVB)
- Most recent champions: Poland (3rd title)
- Most titles: Poland (3 titles)
- Streaming partner: Volleyball TV
- Relegation to: Challenger Cup (2018–2024)
- Website: Volleyball Nations League

The FIVB Men's Volleyball Nations League is an annual international volleyball competition contested by the senior men's national teams of the members of the Fédération Internationale de Volleyball (FIVB), the sport's global governing body. The first tournament took place between May and July 2018, with the final taking place in Lille, France. Russia won the inaugural edition, defeating France in the final.

In July 2018, the FIVB announced that USA would host the next three editions of the men's Volleyball Nations League Finals, from 2019–2021‌. However, the host selection was changed due to a scheduling conflict with the U.S. Independence Day. The FIVB then confirmed Turin, Italy as the new host of the final stage of 2020 VNL, but on 13 March 2020 the FIVB decided to postpone the Nations League until after the 2020 Summer Olympics due to the COVID-19 pandemic. Finally, the FIVB canceled the 2020 edition and confirmed Italy as the host of the 2021 VNL.

In February 2024, the FIVB announced that the competition will be expanded to 18 teams from the 2025 edition onwards while the core and challenge teams' status will be abolished with the reformed format.

The creation of the tournament was announced in October 2017 (alongside the announcement of the Challenger Cup) as a joint project between the FIVB, the IMG and 21 national federations. The Nations League replaced the World League, a former annual men's international event that ran between 1990 and 2017.

A corresponding tournament for women's national teams is the FIVB Women's Volleyball Nations League.

== History ==
=== Adoption ===
In June 2017, Argentinian website Voley Plus reported that the FIVB would drastically change the format for both the 2018 World League and World Grand Prix. According to the reports, starting from 2018, the World League and the World Grand Prix would have only one Group (no more Groups 1, 2 and 3) of 16 national teams.

In October 2017, the FIVB announced, via a press release, the creation of the men's and women's Volleyball Nations League, confirming the tournaments as a replacement for the World League and World Grand Prix.

According to the press release, the tournament is intended to build on the sports presentation used at the Rio 2016 Olympic Games and to increase global fan engagement by presenting volleyball in a new format. The release also states that advanced technology and digital broadcasting would provide home spectators with diverse camera angles to highlight the players' athleticism.

For the first time, the FIVB, in collaboration with the sports marketing company IMG, took control of content production, maximizing quality, and promoting an on-court narrative that was easier for fans to engage with and understand.

== Marketing ==
The International Volleyball Federation has partnered with global brand strategy and design firm Landor Associates to create the Volleyball Nations League branding. Landor has also contributed with in-stadium and on-screen television graphics, staff uniforms, designs for the World Volleyball app, medals and the winning trophy.

=== Digital ===
Microsoft, the multinational technology company, has signed an agreement with the FIVB that the international federation vows will change the way the sport of volleyball is consumed while heightening the fan experience during match days as well as in the digital space. Under the tie-up, the "Microsoft Sports Digital Platform" has been created to create new digital services and deliver personalised content on demand in order to boost the FIVB global audience and improve fan engagement.

== Prize money ==
According to the FIVB, the prize money is equal for both the men's and women's VNL as per the FIVB's gender equality policy.

=== Team awards ===
At the preliminary round, the winning team is awarded US$9,500 for every win and the losing team is awarded US$4,250.

Prize money allocated to teams based on their final place in the final round:

- Champions: US$1,000,000
- Runners-up: US$500,000
- 3rd place: US$300,000
- 4th place: US$180,000
- 5th place: US$130,000
- 6th place: US$85,000
- 7th place: US$65,000
- 8th place: US$40,000

Fair Play Award:

This first fair play award of US$15,000 was awarded to the men's team of Poland in VNL 2022 Finals as they admitted to touching the ball in blocking, or the net multiple times during Finals.

Starting from VNL 2023 finals, A new system of rewarding fair play is introduced. For the first time in international competition, green cards will be shown to players who admit to a block touch or a net touch and thus help save time from unnecessary video challenges. The team with the highest number of green cards received during the VNL Finals will be rewarded a cash prize of US$30,000. In case of a tie, the best-ranked team will be awarded.

=== Individual awards ===
The players selected for the Dream Team receive US$10,000 each while the MVP is given US$30,000.

== Market performance ==
The FIVB announced that the 2019 Volleyball Nations League (both men's and women's) attracted a cumulative global audience of more than 1.5 billion. This number was an increase of 200 million from the 2018 VNL. In total, more than 600,000 tickets were sold in the 2019 VNL.

The cumulative global audience grew by a remarkable 48% growth from 2022 to 2023. Moreover, the sponsorship value of the VNL increased by 27%, and TV viewership increased by 13% to 630 million. The VNL 2023 also captivated a vast audience with a social media reach of 214 million.

== Format ==
=== Previous format ===
As in the former World League, the competition will be divided in two phases, albeit with changes in the competition formula: a preliminary round, with a system of rotating host cities, and a final round played in a pre-selected host city.

The preliminary round is held over five weeks, versus three in the World League. Each week, the participating teams are organized in pools, and each team plays one match against all other teams in its pool. All games in a pool take place over a weekend in the same city.

When all matches of the preliminary round have been played, the top five teams in the overall standings qualify for the final round, and the remaining ones leave the competition. The host nation automatically qualifies for the final round.

16 national teams will compete in the inaugural edition of the tournament; 12 core teams, which are always qualified, and 4 challenger teams, which can face relegation.

- Preliminary round

The 16 teams compete in round-robin tournament, with every core team hosting a pool at least once. The teams are divided into 4 pools of 4 teams in each week and compete five weeks long, with a total of 120 matches. The top five teams after the round-robin tournament join the hosts in the final round. The relegation will consider the four challenger teams and the last ranked challenger team will be excluded from the next edition. The winners of the Challenger Cup would qualify for the next edition as a challenger team.

- Final round

The six qualified teams play in 2 pools of 3 teams in a round-robin format. The top 2 teams of each pool qualify for the semifinals. The first ranked teams play against the second ranked teams in this round. The winners of the semifinals advance to compete for the Nations League title.

=== New format ===
The new format is applied to 2022 edition. The whole competition still be divided into two phases: The pool phase and the Finals.

- Pool phase

The 16 teams will be divided into 2 groups of eight. Each team will play with 12 matches during the three weeks of the preliminary round. Two pools of eight teams will compete in four matches of six days of competition (Tuesday – Sunday). The new competition format allows for a one-week gap between events. The total number of matches in the pool phase will be 96.

- The finals

The Finals will see the eight strongest teams (or the seven strongest teams and the host team) moving directly to the knockout phase which will consist of eight matches in total: four quarterfinals, two semi-finals and the bronze and gold medal matches. The total number of matches in the final phase will be 8.

=== Reform from 2025 ===
The VNL will expand to 18 teams from 2025 alongside format changes that will elevate the VNL experience for athletes, fans, and all stakeholders. To facilitate the reform, there will be no relegation for the VNL 2024 participating teams, while the winner of the 2024 Volleyball Challenger Cup, plus the top ranked not-yet-qualified team as per the Senior Volleyball World Ranking, will join the participating teams of the VNL 2025.

As of the 2025 edition, the core team status shall be abolished with the last team in the competition's final standing relegated, and the top team not yet qualified as per the Senior Volleyball World Ranking promoted into the following edition of the VNL.

== Challenger Cup ==
The FIVB Volleyball Challenger Cup was a competition for national teams which will run in concurrence with the Volleyball Nations League. The Challenger Cup consisted of teams not participating in the current edition of the Volleyball Nations League and featured one host team and seven teams from the five continental confederations as follows:

Confederation	Slots
AVC (Asia)	1
CAVB (Africa)	1
CSV (South America)	1
CEV (Europe)	2
NORCECA (North America)	1
Total	8 (6+H+VNL)

The Continental Confederations, responsible for determining the teams that qualified for the FIVB Challenger Cup, were free to organise their Continental Qualification Tournament or use an existing competition to define the qualified team(s).

The FIVB Challenger Cup held before the FIVB Volleyball Nations League Finals (in 2018 and 2019 editions) but changed it in 2022 edition and the winner earned the right to participate in the following year's Nations League as a challenger team.

=== Former VNL qualification system ===
The lowest ranked Challenger team of the current edition of the VNL played the Volleyball Challenger Cup (VCC) held after the VNL. The winner of the current edition of the VCC was promoted and compete in the following edition of the VNL.

=== New relegation system from 2025 ===
Starting from the 2025 season, the Challenger Cup ceased to exist. However, relegation remains for the last placed team at the end of the previous season. This left spot will be open to by the best ranked team that did not participate in the previous tournament.

== Hosts ==
List of hosts by number of final round championships hosted.

Times hosted	Hosts	Year(s)
2	Italy	2021, 2022
2	Poland	2023, 2024
2	China	2025, 2026
1	France	2018
1	United States	2019

== Appearance ==
Team	Preliminary Round			Final Round		
Team	App.	First	Last	App.	First	Last
Argentina	8	2018	2026	2	2023	2024
Australia	4	2018	2022	–	–	–
Belgium	1	2026	2026	–	–	–
Brazil	8	2018	2026	7	2018	2025
Bulgaria	8	2018	2026	–	–	–
Canada	8	2018	2026	1	2024	2024
China	6	2018	2026	2	2025	2026
Cuba	4	2023	2026	1	2025	2025
France	8	2018	2026	7	2018	2025
Germany	8	2018	2026	–	–	–
Iran	8	2018	2026	2	2019	2022
Italy	8	2018	2026	5	2022	2026
Japan	8	2018	2026	5	2022	2026
Netherlands	5	2021	2025	1	2022	2022
Poland	8	2018	2026	8	2018	2026
Portugal	1	2019	2019	–	–	–
Russia	3	2018	2021	2	2018	2019
Serbia	8	2018	2026	1	2018	2018
Slovenia	6	2021	2026	5	2021	2026
South Korea	1	2018	2018	–	–	–
Turkey	3	2024	2026	1	2026	2026
Ukraine	2	2025	2026	1	2026	2026
United States	8	2018	2026	5	2018	2026
Table current through the 2026 edition.

== Result summary ==
Year	Final host	Final			3rd place match			Teams PR / FR
Year	Final host	Champions	Score	Runners-up	3rd place	Score	4th place	Teams PR / FR
2018; Details	(France); Lille	Russia	3–0	France	United States	3–0	Brazil	16 / 6
2019; Details	(United States); Chicago	Russia	3–1	United States	Poland	3–0	Brazil	16 / 6
2020	(Italy); Turin	Canceled due to COVID-19 pandemic						
2021; Details	(Italy); Rimini	Brazil	3–1	Poland	France	3–0	Slovenia	16 / 4
2022; Details	(Italy); Bologna	France	3–2	United States	Poland	3–0	Italy	16 / 8
2023; Details	(Poland); Gdańsk	Poland	3–1	United States	Japan	3–2	Italy	16 / 8
2024; Details	(Poland); Łódź	France	3–1	Japan	Poland	3–0	Slovenia	16 / 8
2025; Details	(China); Ningbo	Poland	3–0	Italy	Brazil	3–1	Slovenia	18 / 8
2026; Details	(China); Ningbo	Poland	3–2	United States	Slovenia	3–1	Japan	18 / 8

== Medal summary ==
Rank	Nation	Gold	Silver	Bronze	Total
1	Poland	3	1	3	7
2	France	2	1	1	4
3	Russia	2	0	0	2
4	Brazil	1	0	1	2
5	United States	0	4	1	5
6	Japan	0	1	1	2
7	Italy	0	1	0	1
8	Slovenia	0	0	1	1
Totals (8 entries)		8	8	8	24

== MVP by edition ==
- 2018 – (Russia) Maxim Mikhaylov
- 2019 – (United States) Matt Anderson
- 2021 – (Brazil) Wallace de Souza and (Poland) Bartosz Kurek
- 2022 – (France) Earvin N'Gapeth
- 2023 – (Poland) Paweł Zatorski
- 2024 – (France) Antoine Brizard
- 2025 – (Poland) Jakub Kochanowski
- 2026 – (Poland) Tomasz Fornal

== Team performances by season ==
Legend

- 1st – Champions
- 2nd – Runners-up
- 3rd – Third place
- 4th – Fourth place
- – No movement for challenger teams
- ▲ – Promoted to the next year's VNL
- ▼ – Relegated for challenger teams (2018–2024) / Relegated from VNL (2025–present)

Team	2018 (16)			2019 (16)			2021 (16)			2022 (16)			2023 (16)			2024 (16)			2025 (18)		2026 (18)	
Team	G	FR	RK	G	FR	RK	G	FR	RK	G	FR	RK	G	FR	RK	G	FR	RK	FR	RK	FR	RK
Argentina	C	P	14	C	P	7	C	P	9	C	P	9	C	F	5	C	F	8	P	13	P	16
Australia	CH	P	13	CH	P	13	CH	P	16	CH ▼	P	16	did not participate									
Belgium	did not participate															VCC			did not participate		P	14
Brazil	C	F	4	C	F	4	C	F	1	C	F	6	C	F	6	C	F	7	F	3	P	10
Bulgaria	CH	P	11	CH	P	12	CH	P	15	CH	P	14	CH	P	15	CH	P	14	P	11	P	9
Canada	CH	P	7	CH	P	9	CH	P	8	CH	P	15	CH	P	12	CH	F	6	P	14	P	18 ▼
China	C	P	15	C	P	16	Withdrew (Note: Netherlands replaced China after the decision of the Chinese Volleyball Association to withdraw its national men's team due to financial limitations and travel restrictions caused by the COVID-19 pandemic.)			CH	P	13	CH ▼	P	16	VCC ▲			F	8	F	8
Cuba	VCC			VCC			VCC (canceled)			VCC ▲			CH	P	13	CH	P	9	F	7	P	17
France	C	F	2	C	F	6	C	F	3	C	F	1	C	F	8	C	F	1	F	5	P	11
Germany	C	P	9	C	P	14	C	P	13	C	P	12	C	P	11	C	P	11	P	15	P	13
Iran	C	P	10	C	F	5	C	P	12	C	F	7	C	P	14	C	P	15	P	9	P	15
Italy	C	P	8	C	P	8	C	P	10	C	F	4	C	F	4	C	F	5	F	2	F	5
Japan	C	P	12	C	P	10	C	P	11	C	F	5	C	F	3	C	F	2	F	6	F	4
Netherlands	did not participate						CH	P	14	CH	F	8	CH	P	10	CH	P	13	P	18 ▼	did not participate	
Poland	C	F	5	C	F	3	C	F	2	C	F	3	C	F	1	C	F	3	F	1	F	1
Portugal	VCC ▲			CH ▼	P	15	VCC (canceled)			did not participate												
Russia	C	F	1	C	F	1	C	P	5	Excluded (Note: Russian athletes were banned from competing following the 2022 Russian invasion of Ukraine.)												
Serbia	C	F	5	C	P	11	C	P	6	C	P	11	C	P	9	C	P	10	P	16	P	12
Slovenia	did not participate			VCC ▲			CH	F	4	CH	P	10	CH	F	7	CH	F	4	F	4	F	3
South Korea	CH ▼	P	16	VCC (withdrew)			VCC (canceled)			VCC			did not participate									
Turkey	did not participate			VCC			VCC (canceled)			VCC			VCC ▲			CH	P	16	P	17	F	6
Ukraine	did not participate												VCC			VCC			P	10	F	7
United States	C	F	3	C	F	2	C	P	7	C	F	2	C	F	2	C	P	12	P	12	F	2
Table current through the 2026 edition.

== Debut of national teams ==
Year	Debutants	Total
2018	Argentina, Australia, Brazil, Bulgaria, Canada, China, France, Germany, Iran, Italy, Japan, Poland, Russia, Serbia, South Korea, United States	16
2019	Portugal	1
2021	Netherlands, Slovenia	2
2022	None	0
2023	Cuba	1
2024	Turkey	1
2025	Ukraine	1
2026	Belgium	1
2027	Finland	1

== See also ==
- FIVB Women's Volleyball Nations League
- FIVB Volleyball World League
- FIVB Men's Volleyball Challenger Cup
- List of indoor volleyball world medalists
