= 2019 FIVB Men's Volleyball Challenger Cup qualification (NORCECA) =

The North American section of the 2019 FIVB Men's Volleyball Challenger Cup qualification acted as a qualifier event for the 2019 FIVB Men's Volleyball Challenger Cup for national teams that were members of the North, Central America and Caribbean Volleyball Confederation (NORCECA). The tournament was held in Havana, Cuba from 30 May to 1 June 2019. The winners, Cuba, qualified for the 2019 Challenger Cup.

== Qualification ==
The hosts Cuba and the top three ranked teams from the NORCECA Ranking as of 1 January 2019 not yet participating in the 2019 Nations League qualified for the tournament. But, Dominican Republic later withdrew. Rankings are shown in brackets except the hosts who ranked 3rd.

- Cuba (Hosts)
- Puerto Rico (4)
- Mexico (5)
- ~~Dominican Republic (6)~~

== Venue ==
- Coliseo de la Ciudad Deportiva, Havana, Cuba

== Pool standing procedure ==
1. Number of matches won
2. Match points
3. Sets ratio
4. Points ratio
5. Result of the last match between the tied teams

Match won 3–0: 5 match points for the winner, 0 match points for the loser
Match won 3–1: 4 match points for the winner, 1 match point for the loser
Match won 3–2: 3 match points for the winner, 2 match points for the loser

== Round robin ==
- All times are Cuba Daylight Time (UTC−04:00).

| Pos | Team | Pld | W | L | Pts | SPW | SPL | SPR | SW | SL | SR |
|---|---|---|---|---|---|---|---|---|---|---|---|
| 1 | Cuba | 2 | 2 | 0 | 9 | 173 | 139 | 1.245 | 6 | 1 | 6.000 |
| 2 | Puerto Rico | 2 | 1 | 1 | 4 | 186 | 199 | 0.935 | 4 | 5 | 0.800 |
| 3 | Mexico | 2 | 0 | 2 | 2 | 160 | 181 | 0.884 | 2 | 6 | 0.333 |

| Date | Time | | Score | | Set 1 | Set 2 | Set 3 | Set 4 | Set 5 | Total | Report |
|---|---|---|---|---|---|---|---|---|---|---|---|
| 30 May | 16:00 | Cuba | 3–0 | Mexico | 25–16 | 25–22 | 25–21 | | | 75–59 | P2 P3 |
| 31 May | 16:00 | Mexico | 2–3 | Puerto Rico | 25–19 | 15–25 | 25–22 | 23–25 | 13–15 | 101–106 | P2 P3 |
| 1 Jun | 18:00 | Cuba | 3–1 | Puerto Rico | 21–25 | 25–15 | 25–15 | 27–25 | | 98–80 | P2 P3 |

== Final standing ==
| Rank | Team |
|---|---|
| 1 | Cuba |
| 2 | Puerto Rico |
| 3 | Mexico |

| Qualified for the 2019 Challenger Cup |
