= 2022 FIVB Men's Volleyball Nations League =

Tournament details
- Host country: Italy
- City: Bologna (final round)
- Dates: 7 June – 24 July
- Teams: 16 (from 4 confederations)
- Venue: 7 (in 7 host cities)

Final positions
- Champions: France (1st title)
- Runners-up: United States
- Third place: Poland
- Fourth place: Italy
- Relegated: Australia

Tournament awards
- MVP: (France) Earvin N'Gapeth
- Best Setter: (United States) Micah Christenson
- Best OH: (France) Trévor Clévenot; (France) Earvin N'Gapeth
- Best MB: (Poland) Mateusz Bieniek; (United States) David Smith
- Best OPP: (France) Jean Patry
- Best Libero: (France) Jenia Grebennikov

Tournament statistics
- Matches played: 104
- Attendance: 295,262 (2,839 per match)

The 2022 FIVB Men's Volleyball Nations League was the fourth edition of the FIVB Men's Volleyball Nations League, an annual men's international volleyball tournament. The competition was held from 7 June to 24 July 2022, and the final round took place in Unipol Arena, Bologna, Italy.

Australia were the last placed challenger team after the preliminary round and would therefore be replaced by the 2022 Challenger Cup winners Cuba in the 2023 edition.

France won their first VNL title after defeating the United States in a five-set final. It was the United States' second silver medal in the tournament. Poland won their second bronze medal by defeating the host Italy in straight sets in the third-place match. Earvin N'Gapeth from France was named the MVP of the tournament.

== Teams ==
=== Qualification ===
As there was no promotion or relegation in the 2021 VNL, was scheduled for the same 16 teams in 2021 are to compete in this year's edition.

On 1 March 2022, FIVB declared Russia and Belarus not eligible for international and continental competitions due to Russia's invasion of Ukraine. As a result, Russia was expelled from the competition. On April 29, FIVB announced that China will replaces Russia for the competition.

Country	Confederation	Designation	Previous appearances			Previous best performance
Country	Confederation	Designation	Total	First	Last	Previous best performance
Argentina	CSV	Core team	3	2018	2021	7th place (2019)
Australia	AVC	Challenger team	3	2018	2021	13th place (2018, 2019)
Brazil	CSV	Core team	3	2018	2021	Champions (2021)
Bulgaria	CEV	Challenger team	3	2018	2021	11th place (2018)
Canada	NORCECA	Challenger team	3	2018	2021	7th place (2018)
China	AVC	Challenger team	2	2018	2019	15th place (2018)
France	CEV	Core team	3	2018	2021	Runners-up (2018)
Germany	CEV	Core team	3	2018	2021	9th place (2018)
Iran	AVC	Core team	3	2018	2021	5th place (2019)
Italy	CEV	Core team	3	2018	2021	8th place (2018, 2019)
Japan	AVC	Core team	3	2018	2021	10th place (2019)
Netherlands	CEV	Challenger team	1	2021	2021	15th place (2021)
Poland	CEV	Core team	3	2018	2021	Runners-up (2021)
Serbia	CEV	Core team	3	2018	2021	5th place (2018)
Slovenia	CEV	Challenger team	1	2021	2021	4th place (2021)
United States	NORCECA	Core team	3	2018	2021	Runners-up (2019)

== Format ==
=== Preliminary round ===
In the 2022 tournament, the format of play was changed. The new format will see 16 men's teams competing in pools of 8 teams during the pool phase. Each team plays 12 matches during the pool stage. Eight teams will then move into the final knockout phase of the competition.

=== Final round ===
The VNL Finals will see the seven strongest teams along with the finals host country Italy moving directly to the knockout phase which will consist of eight matches in total: four quarterfinals, two semi-finals and the bronze and gold medal matches.

Final 8 direct elimination formula:

1. The 1st ranked team will play a quarterfinal match against the 8th ranked team, the 2nd ranked team will play a quarterfinal match against the 7th ranked team, the 3rd ranked team will play a quarterfinal match against the 6th ranked team, the 4th ranked team will play a quarterfinal match against the 5th ranked team.
2. The Host Team is placed in 1st position if the team is among the top 8 teams in the Final Standings after the VNL Preliminary Phase.
3. The Host Team is placed in 8th position if the team is not among the top 8 teams in the Final Standings after the VNL Preliminary Phase.

== Rule changes ==
1. Court switch at the end of the sets to be eliminated due to COVID-19 safety guidelines and for a better television broadcasts.
2. Each team is allowed to call only one time-out during each set in the preliminary. The time-out lasts 30 seconds long.
3. Only one technical time-out is made when the leading team reaches 12 points.
4. Two time-outs per set are given to all matches in the Finals, one of them can only be called before technical time-out.
5. Live interview is introduced into matches during Set 2 and Set 3 in the Finals. Therefore, the breaks between Set 2 and Set 3 will extend to 5 minutes.

== Pool composition ==
The overview of pools was released on 7 December 2021.

Week 1		Week 2		Week 3	
Pool 1 Brazil	Pool 2 Canada	Pool 3 Philippines	Pool 4 Bulgaria	Pool 5 Japan	Pool 6 Poland
Brazil; China; United States; Slovenia; Japan; Iran; Netherlands; Australia	Canada; Poland; France; Serbia; Argentina; Italy; Germany; Bulgaria	Japan; France; China; Slovenia; Argentina; Italy; Germany; Netherlands	Bulgaria; Brazil; Poland; United States; Serbia; Canada; Iran; Australia	Japan; Brazil; France; United States; Argentina; Canada; Germany; Australia	Poland; China; Slovenia; Serbia; Italy; Iran; Netherlands; Bulgaria

== Venues ==
=== Preliminary round ===
Week 1
Pool 1	Pool 2
Brasília, Brazil	Ottawa, Canada
Nilson Nelson Gymnasium	TD Place Arena
Capacity: 11,105	Capacity: 9,500
Week 2
Pool 3	Pool 4
Quezon City, Philippines	Sofia, Bulgaria
Araneta Coliseum	Armeets Arena
Capacity: 16,035	Capacity: 15,373
Week 3
Pool 5	Pool 6
Osaka, Japan	Gdańsk, Poland
Maruzen Intec Arena	Ergo Arena
Capacity: 10,000	Capacity: 11,409

=== Final round ===
All matches
Casalecchio di Reno, Italy
Unipol Arena
Capacity: 11,000
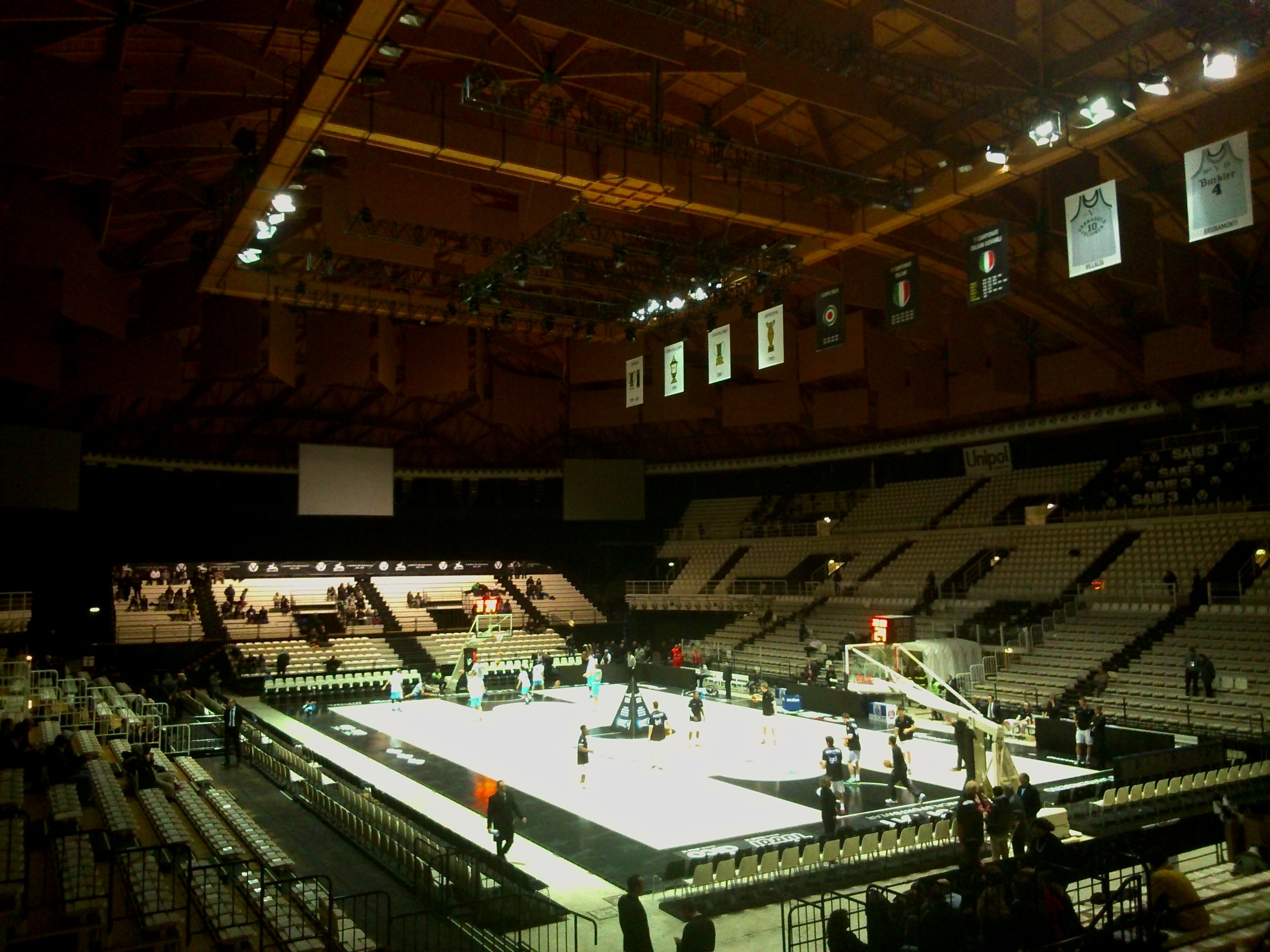

== Competition schedule ==
●	Preliminary round	●	Final round

Week 1 Jun 7–12	Week 2 Jun 21–26	Week 3 Jul 5–10	Week 4 Jul 20–24
32 matches	32 matches	32 matches	8 matches

== Pool standing procedure ==
1. Total number of victories (matches won, matches lost)
2. In the event of a tie, the following first tiebreaker will apply: The teams will be ranked by the most points gained per match as follows:
  - Match won 3–0 or 3–1: 3 points for the winner, 0 points for the loser
  - Match won 3–2: 2 points for the winner, 1 point for the loser
  - Match forfeited: 3 points for the winner, 0 points (0–25, 0–25, 0–25) for the loser
3. If teams are still tied after examining the number of victories and points gained, then the FIVB will examine the results in order to break the tie in the following order:
  - Sets quotient: if two or more teams are tied on the number of points gained, they will be ranked by the quotient resulting from the division of the number of all sets won by the number of all sets lost.
  - Points quotient: if the tie persists based on the sets quotient, the teams will be ranked by the quotient resulting from the division of all points scored by the total of points lost during all sets.
  - If the tie persists based on the points quotient, the tie will be broken based on the team that won the match of the Round Robin Phase between the tied teams. When the tie in points quotient is between three or more teams, these teams ranked taking into consideration only the matches involving the teams in question.

== Preliminary round ==
=== Ranking ===
Pos	Team	Pld	W	L	Pts	SW	SL	SR	SPW	SPL	SPR	Qualification or relegation
1	Italy (Note: Qualified as hosts)	12	10	2	31	32	9	3.556	986	872	1.131	Final round
2	Poland	12	10	2	31	33	10	3.300	1031	898	1.148	Final round
3	United States	12	10	2	27	31	16	1.938	1102	975	1.130	Final round
4	France	12	9	3	28	31	11	2.818	994	826	1.203	Final round
5	Japan	12	9	3	27	29	18	1.611	1092	997	1.095	Final round
6	Brazil	12	8	4	24	26	14	1.857	960	881	1.090	Final round
7	Iran	12	7	5	20	22	19	1.158	961	923	1.041	Final round
8	Netherlands	12	6	6	17	20	21	0.952	915	932	0.982	Final round
9	Argentina	12	5	7	18	24	26	0.923	1110	1117	0.994	
10	Slovenia	12	5	7	15	18	24	0.750	917	963	0.952	
11	Serbia	12	5	7	14	19	27	0.704	1010	1043	0.968	
12	Germany	12	4	8	10	18	29	0.621	969	1103	0.879	
13	China	12	3	9	9	14	28	0.500	840	951	0.883	
14	Bulgaria	12	2	10	9	16	31	0.516	990	1087	0.911	
15	Canada	12	2	10	6	10	33	0.303	887	1022	0.868	
16	Australia	12	1	11	2	8	35	0.229	858	1032	0.831	2022 Challenger Cup

Source: VNL 2022 standings

=== Week 1 ===
==== Pool 1 ====
- All times are Brasília time (UTC−03:00).

Date	Time		Score		Set 1	Set 2	Set 3	Set 4	Set 5	Total	Report
7 Jun	18:00	China	1–3	Iran	15–25	25–19	22–25	15–25		77–94	P2 Report
7 Jun	21:00	Slovenia	0–3	United States	19–25	19–25	14–25			52–75	P2 Report
8 Jun	18:00	Japan	3–1	Netherlands	22–25	26–24	25–22	25–17		98–88	P2 Report
8 Jun	21:00	Brazil	3–0	Australia	25–14	25–18	25–21			75–53	P2 Report
9 Jun	15:00	Japan	3–1	China	21–25	25–19	25–19	25–18		96–81	P2 Report
9 Jun	18:00	Netherlands	0–3	United States	12–25	18–25	16–25			46–75	P2 Report
9 Jun	21:00	Brazil	3–1	Slovenia	25–21	21–25	25–20	25–16		96–82	P2 Report
10 Jun	15:00	Netherlands	3–0	Iran	26–24	25–21	25–21			76–66	P2 Report
10 Jun	18:00	Japan	2–3	United States	25–17	15–25	21–25	28–26	9–15	98–108	P2 Report
10 Jun	21:00	Australia	0–3	Slovenia	22–25	20–25	21–25			63–75	P2 Report
11 Jun	15:00	United States	3–1	Brazil	21–25	27–25	25–20	25–20		98–90	P2 Report
11 Jun	18:00	Slovenia	3–1	China	25–15	25–20	18–25	27–25		95–85	P2 Report
11 Jun	21:00	Iran	3–1	Australia	25–14	25–22	18–25	25–15		93–76	P2 Report
12 Jun	10:00	Brazil	0–3	China	23–25	29–31	23–25			75–81	P2 Report
12 Jun	13:00	Iran	0–3	Japan	20–25	14–25	19–25			53–75	P2 Report
12 Jun	16:00	Netherlands	3–0	Australia	25–20	25–15	25–23			75–58	P2 Report

==== Pool 2 ====
- All times are Eastern Daylight Time (UTC−04:00).

Date	Time		Score		Set 1	Set 2	Set 3	Set 4	Set 5	Total	Report
7 Jun	16:30	Bulgaria	1–3	Serbia	25–19	19–25	22–25	20–25		86–94	P2 Report
7 Jun	19:30	Canada	0–3	Germany	19–25	20–25	28–30			67–80	P2 Report
8 Jun	16:30	Poland	3–0	Argentina	25–21	25–22	25–23			75–66	P2 Report
8 Jun	19:30	France	3–0	Italy	25–22	26–24	25–19			76–65	P2 Report
9 Jun	11:00	Germany	1–3	Argentina	25–18	22–25	17–25	20–25		84–93	P2 Report
9 Jun	16:30	Serbia	1–3	France	25–21	22–25	23–25	23–25		93–96	P2 Report
9 Jun	19:30	Poland	1–3	Italy	25–21	23–25	20–25	20–25		88–96	P2 Report
10 Jun	11:00	Serbia	3–2	Argentina	25–16	25–18	17–25	12–25	15–6	94–90	P2 Report
10 Jun	16:30	Bulgaria	2–3	Germany	20–25	25–22	16–25	25–20	10–15	96–107	P2 Report
10 Jun	19:30	France	3–0	Canada	25–16	25–23	25–21			75–60	P2 Report
11 Jun	13:00	Germany	3–2	Serbia	27–25	25–27	18–25	28–26	18–16	116–119	P2 Report
11 Jun	16:00	Bulgaria	0–3	Poland	19–25	19–25	23–25			61–75	P2 Report
11 Jun	19:00	Canada	0–3	Italy	21–25	18–25	19–25			58–75	P2 Report
12 Jun	11:00	France	1–3	Poland	25–21	22–25	21–25	22–25		90–96	P2 Report
12 Jun	14:00	Argentina	1–3	Italy	20–25	21–25	25–16	28–30		94–96	P2 Report
12 Jun	17:00	Bulgaria	2–3	Canada	18–25	18–25	26–24	25–21	11–15	98–110	P2 Report

=== Week 2 ===
==== Pool 3 ====
- All times are Philippine Standard Time (UTC+08:00).

Date	Time		Score		Set 1	Set 2	Set 3	Set 4	Set 5	Total	Report
21 Jun	15:00	Slovenia	0–3	Netherlands	17–25	21–25	24–26			62–76	P2 Report
21 Jun	19:00	Argentina	1–3	Japan	25–27	18–25	25–17	16–25		84–94	P2 Report
22 Jun	15:00	^{A}China	0–3	France	0–25	0–25	0–25			0–75	Report
22 Jun	19:00	Germany	0–3	Italy	16–25	21–25	22–25			59–75	P2 Report
23 Jun	11:00	France	3–0	Netherlands	25–14	25–23	25–13			75–50	P2 Report
23 Jun	15:00	China	3–0	Germany^{B}	25–0	25–0	25–0			75–0	Report
23 Jun	19:00	Argentina	1–3	Slovenia	20–25	29–27	18–25	17–25		84–102	P2 Report
24 Jun	11:00	Germany	1–3	Netherlands	25–22	29–31	23–25	16–25		93–103	P2 Report
24 Jun	15:00	Argentina	3–1	China	25–22	22–25	25–22	25–22		97–91	P2 Report
24 Jun	19:00	Japan	3–2	Italy	25–20	21–25	24–26	25–19	15–13	110–103	P2 Report
25 Jun	11:00	Argentina	2–3	Netherlands	25–22	23–25	25–20	19–25	13–15	105–107	P2 Report
25 Jun	15:00	Japan	0–3	France	22–25	25–27	16–25			63–77	P2 Report
25 Jun	19:00	Italy	3–0	Slovenia	25–19	25–16	25–21			75–56	P2 Report
26 Jun	11:00	Germany	1–3	France	16–25	19–25	25–19	21–25		81–94	P2 Report
26 Jun	15:00	Japan	3–1	Slovenia	25–21	22–25	25–18	25–19		97–83	P2 Report
26 Jun	19:00	Italy	3–0	China	25–21	25–18	25–19			75–58	P2 Report

==== Pool 4 ====
- All times are Eastern European Summer Time (UTC+03:00).

Date	Time		Score		Set 1	Set 2	Set 3	Set 4	Set 5	Total	Report
21 Jun	17:00	Australia	1–3	Canada	25–18	26–28	19–25	22–25		92–96	P2 Report
21 Jun	20:00	Iran	0–3	Bulgaria	19–25	23–25	24–26			66–76	P2 Report
22 Jun	17:00	Brazil	1–3	Poland	16–25	25–22	16–25	22–25		79–97	P2 Report
22 Jun	20:00	Serbia	1–3	United States	24–26	25–23	23–25	20–25		92–99	P2 Report
23 Jun	13:30	Poland	3–0	Canada	25–16	25–18	25–16			75–50	P2 Report
23 Jun	16:30	Serbia	0–3	Brazil	18–25	24–26	17–25			59–76	P2 Report
23 Jun	20:00	United States	0–3	Iran	18–25	27–29	25–27			70–81	P2 Report
24 Jun	13:30	Serbia	3–2	Canada	20–25	19–25	25–20	26–24	15–11	105–105	P2 Report
24 Jun	16:30	Iran	0–3	Brazil	28–30	23–25	19–25			70–80	P2 Report
24 Jun	20:00	Australia	3–2	Bulgaria	21–25	25–13	25–22	20–25	17–15	108–100	P2 Report
25 Jun	13:30	Canada	0–3	Iran	21–25	25–27	18–25			64–77	P2 Report
25 Jun	16:30	Poland	3–0	Australia	25–17	25–19	25–14			75–50	P2 Report
25 Jun	20:00	United States	3–1	Bulgaria	25–12	20–25	26–24	25–23		96–84	P2 Report
26 Jun	13:30	Serbia	3–0	Australia	25–17	25–20	25–22			75–59	P2 Report
26 Jun	16:30	United States	1–3	Poland	25–21	23–25	24–26	22–25		94–97	P2 Report
26 Jun	20:00	Bulgaria	0–3	Brazil	21–25	19–25	22–25			62–75	P2 Report

=== Week 3 ===
==== Pool 5 ====
- All times are Japan Standard Time (UTC+09:00).

Date	Time		Score		Set 1	Set 2	Set 3	Set 4	Set 5	Total	Report
5 Jul	15:00	United States	3–1	Germany	25–21	25–19	22–25	25–18		97–83	P2 Report
5 Jul	18:00	Canada	1–3	Argentina	21–25	25–23	21–25	23–25		90–98	P2 Report
6 Jul	15:40	Brazil	3–1	Germany	25–27	25–17	25–20	25–19		100–83	P2 Report
6 Jul	19:10	Japan	3–1	Australia	25–18	25–15	23–25	25–19		98–77	P2 Report
7 Jul	12:00	France	2–3	United States	25–15	22–25	25–22	14–25	8–15	94–102	P2 Report
7 Jul	15:00	Germany	3–1	Australia	20–25	25–16	25–21	26–24		96–86	P2 Report
7 Jul	18:00	Canada	0–3	Brazil	18–25	19–25	16–25			53–75	P2 Report
8 Jul	12:40	Argentina	3–1	Australia	21–25	25–23	25–19	25–15		96–82	P2 Report
8 Jul	15:40	France	3–0	Brazil	25–21	25–22	25–21			75–64	P2 Report
8 Jul	19:10	Japan	3–1	Canada	25–20	25–16	22–25	25–20		97–81	P2 Report
9 Jul	12:40	France	1–3	Argentina	22–25	25–23	23–25	19–25		89–98	P2 Report
9 Jul	15:40	Canada	0–3	United States	19–25	15–25	19–25			53–75	P2 Report
9 Jul	19:10	Germany	1–3	Japan	25–23	22–25	20–25	20–25		87–98	P2 Report
10 Jul	12:40	United States	3–2	Argentina	29–27	22–25	20–25	25–13	17–15	113–105	P2 Report
10 Jul	15:40	Australia	0–3	France	16–25	12–25	26–28			54–78	P2 Report
10 Jul	19:10	Brazil	3–0	Japan	25–23	25–23	25–22			75–68	P2 Report

==== Pool 6 ====
- All times are Central European Summer Time (UTC+02:00).

Date	Time		Score		Set 1	Set 2	Set 3	Set 4	Set 5	Total	Report
5 Jul	17:00	Bulgaria	0–3	Italy	15–25	20–25	23–25			58–75	P2 Report
5 Jul	20:00	Iran	3–2	Poland	21–25	25–23	25–22	25–27	15–7	111–104	P2 Report
6 Jul	17:00	Netherlands	3–0	China	29–27	25–12	25–13			79–52	P2 Report
6 Jul	20:00	Slovenia	3–0	Serbia	25–15	25–19	25–23			75–57	P2 Report
7 Jul	14:00	Italy	3–1	Iran	25–16	25–27	25–23	25–23		100–89	P2 Report
7 Jul	17:00	Bulgaria	1–3	Slovenia	22–25	25–22	18–25	16–25		81–97	P2 Report
7 Jul	20:00	Poland	3–0	China	26–24	25–16	25–18			76–58	P2 Report
8 Jul	14:00	Bulgaria	3–1	Netherlands	22–25	25–16	25–21	25–21		97–83	P2 Report
8 Jul	17:00	Slovenia	0–3	Iran	24–26	14–25	21–25			59–76	P2 Report
8 Jul	20:00	Italy	3–0	Serbia	25–21	25–14	25–23			75–58	P2 Report
9 Jul	14:00	China	3–1	Bulgaria	26–28	25–23	25–23	25–17		101–91	P2 Report
9 Jul	17:00	Iran	3–0	Serbia	35–33	25–21	25–12			85–66	P2 Report
9 Jul	20:00	Poland	3–0	Netherlands	25–19	25–23	25–22			75–64	P2 Report
10 Jul	14:00	China	1–3	Serbia	17–25	17–25	25–23	22–25		81–98	P2 Report
10 Jul	17:00	Italy	3–0	Netherlands	25–23	26–24	25–21			76–68	P2 Report
10 Jul	20:00	Poland	3–1	Slovenia	25–14	25–23	23–25	25–17		98–79	P2 Report

== Final round ==
- All times are Central European Summer Time (UTC+02:00).

Quarter-finals
20 July
Italy	3
Netherlands	1
21 July
France	3
Japan	0
21 July
Poland	3
Iran	2
20 July
United States	3
Brazil	1

Semi-finals
23 July
Italy	0
France	3
23 July
Poland	0
United States	3

Final
24 July
France	3
United States	2
Third place match
24 July
Italy	0
Poland	3

=== Quarter-finals ===
Date	Time		Score		Set 1	Set 2	Set 3	Set 4	Set 5	Total	Report
20 Jul	18:00	United States	3–1	Brazil	20–25	25–22	25–23	25–17		95–87	P2 Report
20 Jul	21:00	Italy	3–1	Netherlands	21–25	25–22	25–13	25–22		96–82	P2 Report
21 Jul	18:00	France	3–0	Japan	26–24	25–16	25–20			76–60	P2 Report
21 Jul	21:00	Poland	3–2	Iran	25–21	24–26	25–18	16–25	15–7	105–97	P2 Report

=== Semi-finals ===
Date	Time		Score		Set 1	Set 2	Set 3	Set 4	Set 5	Total	Report
23 Jul	18:00	Poland	0–3	United States	22–25	23–25	13–25			58–75	P2 Report
23 Jul	21:00	Italy	0–3	France	22–25	20–25	15–25			57–75	P2 Report

=== Third place match ===
Date	Time		Score		Set 1	Set 2	Set 3	Set 4	Set 5	Total	Report
24 Jul	18:00	Italy	0–3	Poland	16–25	23–25	20–25			59–75	P2 Report

=== Final ===
Date	Time		Score		Set 1	Set 2	Set 3	Set 4	Set 5	Total	Report
24 Jul	21:00	France	3–2	United States	25–16	25–19	15–25	21–25	15–10	101–95	P2 Report

== Final standing ==
Rank	Team
1st place, gold medalist(s)	France
2nd place, silver medalist(s)	United States
3rd place, bronze medalist(s)	Poland
4	Italy
5	Japan
6	Brazil
7	Iran
8	Netherlands
9	Argentina
10	Slovenia
11	Serbia
12	Germany
13	China
14	Bulgaria
15	Canada
16	Australia

2022 Men's VNL champions

France
First title

14–man roster
Barthélémy Chinenyeze, Jenia Grebennikov, Jean Patry, Benjamin Toniutti (c), Earvin N'Gapeth, Antoine Brizard, Stéphen Boyer, Nicolas Le Goff, Médéric Henry, Trévor Clévenot, Yacine Louati, Benjamin Diez, Pierre Derouillon, Quentin Jouffroy
Head coach
Andrea Giani

== Awards ==
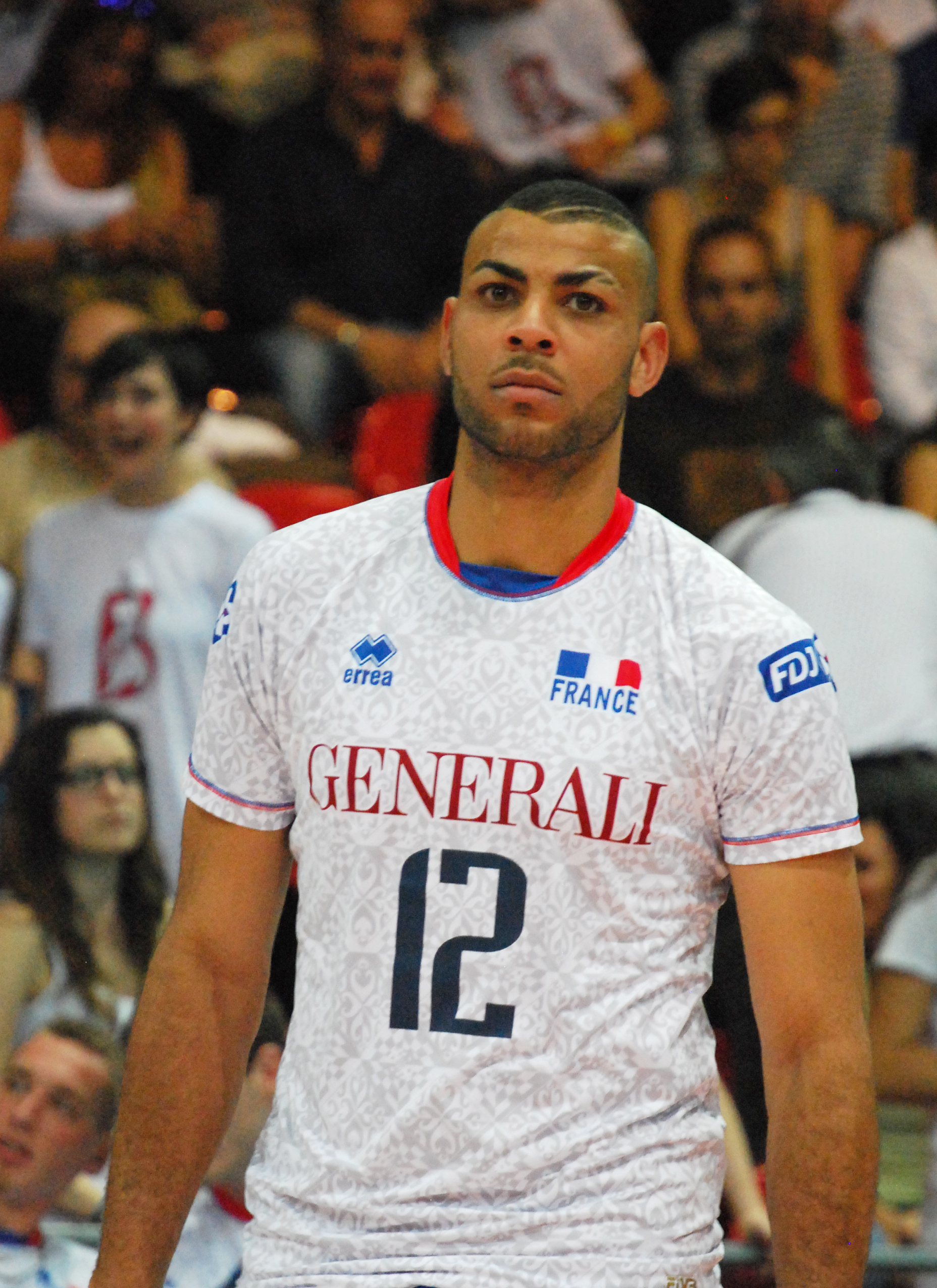
Earvin N'Gapeth was the 2022 FIVB Nations League Most Valuable Player

- Most valuable player
  Earvin N'Gapeth (FRA)
- Best setter
  Micah Christenson (USA)
- Best outside spikers
  Trévor Clévenot (FRA)
  Earvin N'Gapeth (FRA)
- Best middle blockers
  Mateusz Bieniek (POL)
  David Smith (USA)
- Best opposite spiker
  Jean Patry (FRA)
- Best libero
  Jenia Grebennikov (FRA)
- Fair play award
  Poland

== Statistics leaders ==
=== Preliminary round ===
Statistics leaders correct at the end of preliminary round.

Best Scorers (Note: (Best scorers determined by scored points from spike, block and serve).)
	Player	Attacks	Blocks	Serves	Total
1	(Netherlands) Nimir Abdel-Aziz	191	10	30	231
2	(Iran) Amin Esmaeilnezhad	169	11	13	193
3	(Japan) Yuji Nishida	156	10	27	193
4	(Bulgaria) Aleksandar Nikolov	150	13	9	172
5	(Japan) Yūki Ishikawa	122	13	29	164

Best Attackers (Note: (Best attackers determined by successful spikes).)
	Player	Spikes	Faults	Shots	%	Total
1	(Netherlands) Nimir Abdel-Aziz	191	53	125	51.76	369
2	(Iran) Amin Esmaeilnezhad	169	47	96	54.17	312
3	(Japan) Yuji Nishida	156	47	70	57.14	273
4	(Bulgaria) Aleksandar Nikolov	150	43	97	51.72	290
5	(China) Jingyin Zhang	140	49	73	53.44	262

Best Blockers (Note: (Best blockers determined by the stuff blocks, faults and rebounds).)
	Player	Blocks	Faults	Rebounds	Avg	Total
1	(Bulgaria) Svetoslav Gotsev	35	38	19	2.92	92
2	(Brazil) Flávio Gualberto	27	38	56	2.25	121
3	(Argentina) Agustín Loser	26	70	53	2.17	149
4	(United States) David Smith	24	31	44	2.00	99
5	(Slovenia) Jan Kozamernik	22	36	30	1.83	88

Best Servers (Note: (Best servers determined by aces, faults and hits).)
	Player	Aces	Faults	Hits	Avg	Total
1	(Netherlands) Nimir Abdel-Aziz	30	55	79	2.50	164
2	(Japan) Yūki Ishikawa	29	41	97	2.42	167
3	(Japan) Yuji Nishida	27	49	72	2.25	148
4	(United States) Aaron Russell	21	31	101	1.75	153
5	(Poland) Mateusz Bieniek	16	22	75	2.00	113

Best Setters (Note: (Best setters determined by running setts, faults and still sets).)
	Player	Running	Faults	Still	Avg	Total
1	(Bulgaria) Georgi Seganov	301	8	587	25.08	896
2	(Brazil) Bruno Rezende	299	5	450	24.92	754
3	(Italy) Simone Giannelli	269	3	577	22.42	849
4	(United States) Joshua Tuaniga	257	1	345	21.42	603
5	(Argentina) Matías Sánchez	252	0	319	21.00	571

Best Diggers (Note: (Best diggers determined by successful digs, faults and receptions).)
	Player	Digs	Faults	Receptions	Avg	Total
1	(Argentina) Santiago Danani	117	52	24	9.75	193
2	(Japan) Tomohiro Yamamoto	101	22	20	8.42	143
3	(Germany) Julian Zenger	100	34	39	9.09	173
4	(France) Benjamin Diez	90	17	16	8.18	123
5	(Netherlands) Robbert Andringa	72	29	10	6.00	111

Best Receivers (Note: (Best receivers determined by efficient receptions, faults and serve receptions).)
	Player	Excellents	Faults	Serve	%	Total
1	(Argentina) Santiago Danani	87	10	116	40.85	213
2	(Australia) Lorenzo Pope	75	23	136	32.05	234
3	(Germany) Julian Zenger	74	15	123	34.91	212
4	(Japan) Tomohiro Yamamoto	69	9	87	41.82	165
5	(Japan) Yūki Ishikawa	67	8	112	35.83	187

=== Final round ===
Statistics leaders correct at the end of final round.

Best Scorers
	Player	Attacks	Blocks	Serves	Total
1	(France) Jean Patry	47	2	3	52
2	(United States) Aaron Russell	43	0	0	43
3	(United States) Torey DeFalco	35	1	7	43
4	(Poland) Bartosz Kurek	33	1	5	39
5	(France) Earvin N'Gapeth	31	1	4	36

Best Attackers
	Player	Spikes	Faults	Shots	%	Total
1	(France) Jean Patry	47	7	23	61.04	77
2	(United States) Aaron Russell	43	10	22	57.33	75
3	(United States) Torey DeFalco	35	12	21	51.47	68
4	(Poland) Bartosz Kurek	33	11	33	42.86	77
5	(France) Earvin N'Gapeth	31	7	18	55.36	56

Best Blockers
	Player	Blocks	Faults	Rebounds	Avg	Total
1	(United States) David Smith	8	16	19	2.67	43
2	(United States) Jeffrey Jendryk	6	21	13	2.00	40
3	(France) Nicolas Le Goff	6	12	6	2.00	24
4	(France) Barthélémy Chinenyeze	5	6	6	1.67	17
5	(United States) Micah Christenson	4	6	4	1.33	14

Best Servers
	Player	Aces	Faults	Hits	Avg	Total
1	(United States) Torey DeFalco	7	9	38	2.33	54
2	(France) Antoine Brizard	7	7	31	2.33	45
3	(Poland) Jakub Kochanowski	6	8	26	2.00	40
4	(Poland) Bartosz Kurek	5	13	20	1.67	38
5	(Poland) Mateusz Bieniek	5	7	28	1.67	40

Best Setters
	Player	Running	Faults	Still	Avg	Total
1	(United States) Micah Christenson	72	1	178	24.00	251
2	(France) Antoine Brizard	47	1	147	15.67	195
3	(Italy) Simone Giannelli	39	1	165	13.00	205
4	(Poland) Marcin Janusz	38	1	167	12.67	206
5	(Brazil) Bruno Rezende	29	0	63	29.00	92

Best Diggers
	Player	Digs	Faults	Receptions	Avg	Total
1	(Italy) Fabio Balaso	35	6	3	11.67	44
2	(United States) Aaron Russell	25	11	2	8.33	38
3	(United States) Erik Shoji	23	9	2	7.67	34
4	(France) Jenia Grebennikov	21	4	4	7.00	29
5	(Poland) Paweł Zatorski	21	9	1	7.00	31

Best Receivers
	Player	Excellents	Faults	Serve	%	Total
1	(France) Trevor Clevenot	32	1	33	48.48	66
2	(United States) Erik Shoji	23	4	29	41.07	56
3	(United States) Aaron Russell	20	4	46	28.57	70
4	(Poland) Kamil Semeniuk	20	1	30	39.22	51
3	(France) Earvin N'Gapeth	19	2	30	37.25	51

== Controversies at the Finals ==
Athletes and organizations complained about the organization of the Finals including poor facilities of training halls, transportation arrangements and meals arrangement. FIVB later apologized for the incidents and arranged a meeting with national teams' captains.

== See also ==
- 2022 FIVB Volleyball Men's Challenger Cup
- 2022 FIVB Volleyball Men's World Championship

== Notes ==
A.China forfeited the match on 22 June giving France a 3–0 win due to medical circumstances related to COVID-19.
B.Germany forfeited the match on 23 June giving China a 3–0 win because they refused to play against China even though the Chinese athletes were cleared by local authorities after testing positive for COVID-19.
