= 2023 FIVB Men's Volleyball Nations League =

Siatkarskiej Ligi Narodów 2023 (Polish)

Tournament details
- Host country: Poland
- City: Gdańsk (final round)
- Dates: 6 June – 23 July
- Teams: 16 (from 4 confederations)
- Venue: 7 (in 7 host cities)

Final positions
- Champions: Poland (1st title)
- Runners-up: United States
- Third place: Japan
- Fourth place: Italy
- Relegated: China

Tournament awards
- MVP: (Poland) Paweł Zatorski
- Best Setter: (United States) Micah Christenson
- Best OH: (Poland) Aleksander Śliwka; (Japan) Yūki Ishikawa
- Best MB: (Poland) Jakub Kochanowski; (United States) David Smith
- Best OPP: (Poland) Łukasz Kaczmarek
- Best Libero: (Poland) Paweł Zatorski

Tournament statistics
- Matches played: 104
- Attendance: 318,294 (3,061 per match)

The 2023 FIVB Men's Volleyball Nations League was the fifth edition of the FIVB Men's Volleyball Nations League, an annual men's international volleyball tournament. The competition was held from 6 June to 23 July 2023, with the final round taking place at the Ergo Arena, Gdańsk, Poland.

Following the results of 2022 Nations League and 2022 Challenger Cup, Australia were replaced by debutants Cuba in this edition.

Finals host and home team Poland won their first VNL title after defeating the United States in four sets. It was the United States' third silver medal. Japan defeated Italy in a tie-breaker match and claimed the bronze medal. Paweł Zatorski from Poland was named the MVP of the tournament.

== Teams ==
=== Qualification ===
Sixteen teams qualified for the competition. Ten of them qualified as core teams which cannot face relegation. Other six teams were selected as challenger teams which could be relegated from the tournament. Cuba replaced Australia after winning the 2022 Challenger Cup.

Country	Confederation	Designation	Previous appearances			Previous best performance
Country	Confederation	Designation	Total	First	Last	Previous best performance
Argentina	CSV	Core team	4	2018	2022	7th place (2019)
Brazil	CSV	Core team	4	2018	2022	Champions (2021)
Bulgaria	CEV	Challenger team	4	2018	2022	11th place (2018)
Canada	NORCECA	Challenger team	4	2018	2022	7th place (2018)
China	AVC	Challenger team	3	2018	2022	13th place (2022)
Cuba	NORCECA	Challenger team	0	None		Debut
France	CEV	Core team	4	2018	2022	Champions (2022)
Germany	CEV	Core team	4	2018	2022	9th place (2018)
Iran	AVC	Core team	4	2018	2022	5th place (2019)
Italy	CEV	Core team	4	2018	2022	4th place (2022)
Japan	AVC	Core team	4	2018	2022	5th place (2022)
Netherlands	CEV	Challenger team	2	2021	2022	8th place (2022)
Poland	CEV	Core team	4	2018	2022	Runners-up (2021)
Serbia	CEV	Core team	4	2018	2022	5th place (2018)
Slovenia	CEV	Challenger team	2	2021	2022	4th place (2021)
United States	NORCECA	Core team	4	2018	2022	Runners-up (2019, 2022)

== Format ==
=== Preliminary round ===
The format of play is the same as edition 2022. The new format will see 16 men's teams competing in pools of 8 teams during the pool phase. Each team plays 12 matches during the pool stage. Eight teams will then move into the final knockout phase of the competition.

=== Final round ===
The VNL Finals will see the top eight teams moving directly to the knockout phase which will consist of eight matches in total: four quarterfinals, two semi-finals and the bronze and gold medal matches.

Final 8 direct elimination formula:

- The first ranked team will play a quarterfinal match against the eighth ranked team, the second ranked team will play a quarterfinal match against the seventh ranked team, the third ranked team will play a quarterfinal match against the sixth ranked team, the fourth ranked team will play a quarterfinal match against the fifth ranked team.
- The national team of the hosting territory of the event will have a guaranteed berth for the Final round. If the host nation does not finish in the top eight in Preliminary round, they will replace the eighth place team and play as the eighth seed.

== Pool composition ==
The overview of pools was released on 11 November 2022.

Week 1		Week 2		Week 3	
Pool 1 Canada	Pool 2 Japan	Pool 3 Netherlands	Pool 4 France	Pool 5 United States	Pool 6 Philippines
Canada; Cuba; United States; Germany; Argentina; Netherlands; Italy; Brazil	Japan; Slovenia; France; Poland; Serbia; China; Bulgaria; Iran	Netherlands; United States; Poland; Iran; Italy; Germany; Serbia; China	France; Cuba; Brazil; Japan; Slovenia; Bulgaria; Argentina; Canada	United States; Iran; Argentina; Bulgaria; France; Germany; Serbia; Cuba	Japan; Poland; China; Italy; Slovenia; Netherlands; Brazil; Canada

== Venues ==
=== Preliminary round ===
Week 1
Pool 1	Pool 2
Ottawa, Canada	Nagoya, Japan
TD Place Arena	Nippon Gaishi Hall
Capacity: 9,500	Capacity: 10,000
Week 2
Pool 3	Pool 4
Rotterdam, Netherlands	Orléans, France
Rotterdam Ahoy	CO'MET Arena
Capacity: 16,426	Capacity: 10,000
Week 3
Pool 5	Pool 6
Anaheim, United States	Pasay, Philippines
Anaheim Convention Center	SM Mall of Asia Arena
Capacity: 7,500	Capacity: 15,000

=== Final round ===
All matches
Gdańsk, Poland
Ergo Arena
Capacity: 11,409
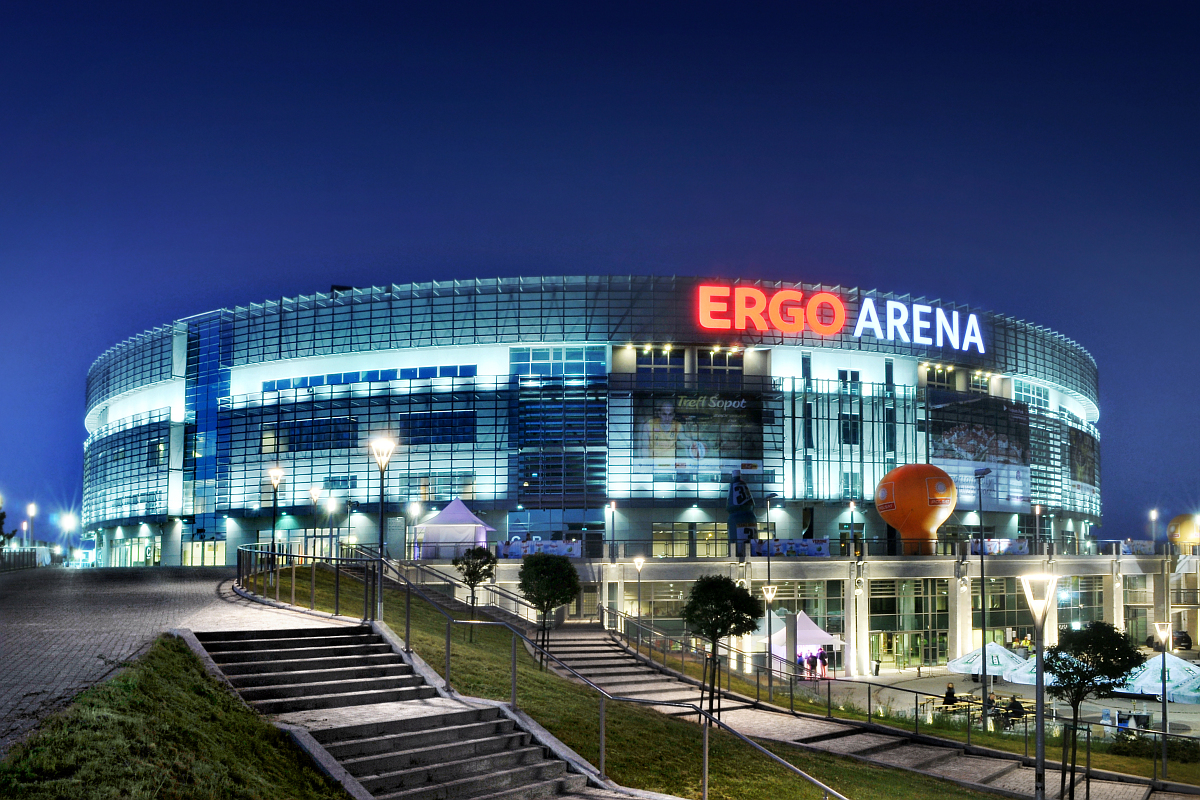

== Competition schedule ==
●	Preliminary round	●	Final round

Week 1 6–11 Jun	Week 2 20–25 Jun	Week 3 4–9 Jul	Week 4 19–23 Jul
32 matches	32 matches	32 matches	8 matches

== Pool standing procedure ==
1. Total number of victories (matches won, matches lost)
2. In the event of a tie, the following first tiebreaker will apply: The teams will be ranked by the most points gained per match as follows:
  - Match won 3–0 or 3–1: 3 points for the winner, 0 points for the loser
  - Match won 3–2: 2 points for the winner, 1 point for the loser
  - Match forfeited: 3 points for the winner, 0 points (0–25, 0–25, 0–25) for the loser
3. If teams are still tied after examining the number of victories and points gained, then the FIVB will examine the results in order to break the tie in the following order:
  - Sets quotient: if two or more teams are tied on the number of points gained, they will be ranked by the quotient resulting from the division of the number of all sets won by the number of all sets lost.
  - Points quotient: if the tie persists based on the sets quotient, the teams will be ranked by the quotient resulting from the division of all points scored by the total of points lost during all sets.
  - If the tie persists based on the points quotient, the tie will be broken based on the team that won the match of the Round Robin Phase between the tied teams. When the tie in points quotient is between three or more teams, these teams ranked taking into consideration only the matches involving the teams in question.

== Preliminary round ==
=== Ranking ===
Pos	Team	Pld	W	L	Pts	SW	SL	SR	SPW	SPL	SPR	Qualification or relegation
1	United States	12	10	2	31	33	7	4.714	986	871	1.132	Final round
2	Japan	12	10	2	27	31	16	1.938	1109	1034	1.073	Final round
3	Poland (Note: Qualified as hosts)	12	10	2	25	30	19	1.579	1108	1057	1.048	Final round
4	Italy	12	9	3	26	28	15	1.867	1016	906	1.121	Final round
5	Argentina	12	9	3	26	32	18	1.778	1184	1092	1.084	Final round
6	Brazil	12	8	4	25	30	18	1.667	1108	1033	1.073	Final round
7	Slovenia	12	8	4	25	27	17	1.588	1036	997	1.039	Final round
8	France	12	6	6	18	23	21	1.095	1046	1007	1.039	Final round
9	Serbia	12	6	6	16	23	23	1.000	1045	1056	0.990	
10	Netherlands	12	5	7	17	22	24	0.917	1028	1054	0.975	
11	Germany	12	3	9	10	16	28	0.571	963	1036	0.930	
12	Canada	12	3	9	9	15	31	0.484	983	1074	0.915	
13	Cuba	12	3	9	8	15	33	0.455	1023	1119	0.914	
14	Iran	12	2	10	11	16	31	0.516	995	1073	0.927	
15	Bulgaria	12	2	10	8	13	32	0.406	957	1045	0.916	
16	China	12	2	10	6	12	33	0.364	941	1074	0.876	2023 Challenger Cup

Source: VNL 2023 Preliminary Phase

=== Week 1 ===
==== Pool 1 ====
- All times are Eastern Daylight Time (UTC−04:00).

Date	Time		Score		Set 1	Set 2	Set 3	Set 4	Set 5	Total	Report
6 Jun	16:30	Italy	0–3	Argentina	22–25	23–25	18–25			63–75	P2 Report
6 Jun	20:00	Canada	3–2	Cuba	25–21	26–28	25–21	22–25	15–13	113–108	P2 Report
7 Jun	16:30	United States	3–0	Netherlands	25–19	25–23	25–21			75–63	P2 Report
7 Jun	20:00	Brazil	3–1	Germany	26–24	25–16	19–25	25–15		95–80	P2 Report
8 Jun	11:00	Netherlands	3–0	Cuba	28–26	25–23	25–18			78–67	P2 Report
8 Jun	16:30	Italy	0–3	United States	15–25	18–25	19–25			52–75	P2 Report
8 Jun	20:00	Argentina	2–3	Brazil	25–19	19–25	25–23	23–25	13–15	105–107	P2 Report
9 Jun	11:00	Netherlands	3–0	Germany	25–20	33–31	25–21			83–72	P2 Report
9 Jun	16:30	Italy	3–1	Cuba	25–20	25–19	20–25	25–18		95–82	P2 Report
9 Jun	20:00	Canada	1–3	Argentina	21–25	25–21	21–25	16–25		83–96	P2 Report
10 Jun	13:00	Germany	1–3	Italy	23–25	18–25	27–25	19–25		87–100	P2 Report
10 Jun	16:30	Brazil	2–3	Cuba	16–25	25–22	29–27	22–25	18–20	110–119	P2 Report
10 Jun	20:00	Canada	0–3	United States	22–25	20–25	20–25			62–75	P2 Report
11 Jun	11:00	Argentina	3–2	Netherlands	34–36	25–20	25–17	20–25	15–10	119–108	P2 Report
11 Jun	14:30	United States	1–3	Brazil	19–25	25–21	15–25	21–25		80–96	P2 Report
11 Jun	18:00	Canada	1–3	Germany	25–20	17–25	21–25	21–25		84–95	P2 Report

==== Pool 2 ====
- All times are Japan Standard Time (UTC+09:00).

Date	Time		Score		Set 1	Set 2	Set 3	Set 4	Set 5	Total	Report
6 Jun	16:10	Bulgaria	2–3	China	20–25	25–21	21–25	25–20	9–15	100–106	P2 Report
6 Jun	19:40	Japan	3–0	Iran	25–16	25–22	25–19			75–57	P2 Report
7 Jun	15:00	Slovenia	3–1	Serbia	31–29	19–25	25–20	25–21		100–95	P2 Report
7 Jun	18:00	Poland	3–1	France	25–23	18–25	35–33	25–15		103–96	P2 Report
8 Jun	12:00	Slovenia	0–3	Bulgaria	24–26	23–25	17–25			64–76	P2 Report
8 Jun	15:00	Serbia	3–0	China	34–32	25–16	25–20			84–68	P2 Report
8 Jun	18:00	Poland	3–2	Iran	23–25	23–25	25–21	25–15	15–13	111–99	P2 Report
9 Jun	13:10	China	1–3	France	20–25	25–23	16–25	17–25		78–98	P2 Report
9 Jun	16:10	Poland	3–2	Bulgaria	25–27	25–19	22–25	25–22	15–11	112–104	P2 Report
9 Jun	19:40	Japan	3–1	Serbia	22–25	25–21	25–23	25–20		97–89	P2 Report
10 Jun	12:40	France	1–3	Slovenia	23–25	18–25	25–21	22–25		88–96	P2 Report
10 Jun	15:40	Iran	3–1	China	23–25	25–15	25–20	25–14		98–74	P2 Report
10 Jun	19:10	Japan	3–0	Bulgaria	25–22	25–21	26–24			76–67	P2 Report
11 Jun	12:40	Slovenia	3–0	Iran	25–19	25–23	25–23			75–65	P2 Report
11 Jun	15:40	Serbia	3–0	Poland	25–21	25–19	25–14			75–54	P2 Report
11 Jun	19:10	Japan	3–1	France	25–27	25–22	25–21	25–20		100–90	P2 Report

=== Week 2 ===
==== Pool 3 ====
- All times are Central European Summer Time (UTC+02:00).

Date	Time		Score		Set 1	Set 2	Set 3	Set 4	Set 5	Total	Report
20 Jun	13:00	Iran	3–0	Germany	25–23	26–24	25–16			76–63	P2 Report
20 Jun	16:30	United States	3–1	Serbia	22–25	25–19	25–19	25–21		97–84	P2 Report
20 Jun	20:00	Netherlands	3–0	China	25–19	25–22	25–21			75–62	P2 Report
21 Jun	13:00	Iran	0–3	Italy	19–25	16–25	24–26			59–76	P2 Report
21 Jun	16:30	United States	3–0	China	28–26	25–22	25–18			78–66	P2 Report
21 Jun	20:00	Germany	2–3	Poland	21–25	25–22	14–25	25–17	10–15	95–104	P2 Report
22 Jun	13:00	China	0–3	Italy	13–25	19–25	24–26			56–76	P2 Report
22 Jun	16:30	Serbia	3–1	Germany	25–21	20–25	25–23	25–23		95–92	P2 Report
22 Jun	20:00	Netherlands	2–3	Poland	25–22	18–25	25–18	22–25	11–15	101–105	P2 Report
23 Jun	16:30	Iran	0–3	United States	22–25	18–25	23–25			63–75	P2 Report
23 Jun	20:00	Serbia	0–3	Italy	11–25	21–25	20–25			52–75	P2 Report
24 Jun	13:00	Poland	0–3	United States	22–25	18–25	19–25			59–75	P2 Report
24 Jun	17:00	Netherlands	3–2	Iran	16–25	25–16	21–25	25–17	15–10	102–93	P2 Report
24 Jun	20:30	China	3–1	Germany	23–25	25–18	25–19	25–21		98–83	P2 Report
25 Jun	12:30	Italy	1–3	Poland	19–25	26–28	25–18	20–25		90–96	P2 Report
25 Jun	16:00	Netherlands	2–3	Serbia	25–22	21–25	25–21	33–35	9–15	113–118	P2 Report

==== Pool 4 ====
- All times are Central European Summer Time (UTC+02:00).

Date	Time		Score		Set 1	Set 2	Set 3	Set 4	Set 5	Total	Report
20 Jun	13:00	Japan	3–1	Canada	25–22	25–17	24–26	25–14		99–79	P2 Report
20 Jun	17:00	Argentina	1–3	Slovenia	25–21	21–25	21–25	21–25		88–96	P2 Report
20 Jun	20:30	Brazil	3–0	Bulgaria	25–22	25–17	25–15			75–54	P2 Report
21 Jun	13:00	Japan	3–0	Cuba	25–21	25–16	25–21			75–58	P2 Report
21 Jun	17:00	Slovenia	3–0	Canada	25–23	25–22	25–14			75–59	P2 Report
21 Jun	20:30	Argentina	3–1	France	22–25	26–24	25–21	25–20		98–90	P2 Report
22 Jun	13:00	Japan	3–2	Brazil	25–23	25–21	18–25	22–25	18–16	108–110	P2 Report
22 Jun	17:00	Canada	3–1	Bulgaria	22–25	25–23	25–22	25–20		97–90	P2 Report
22 Jun	20:30	Slovenia	3–1	Cuba	22–25	25–15	25–16	25–19		97–75	P2 Report
23 Jun	16:30	Argentina	3–0	Bulgaria	25–18	25–21	25–22			75–61	P2 Report
23 Jun	20:30	France	3–0	Cuba	25–18	25–20	25–20			75–58	P2 Report
24 Jun	13:00	Japan	3–2	Argentina	25–18	25–22	31–33	22–25	15–12	118–110	P2 Report
24 Jun	17:00	Brazil	3–1	Slovenia	23–25	25–21	26–24	25–21		99–91	P2 Report
24 Jun	20:30	Canada	0–3	France	17–25	21–25	21–25			59–75	P2 Report
25 Jun	13:00	Bulgaria	2–3	Cuba	25–23	19–25	20–25	25–16	16–18	105–107	P2 Report
25 Jun	17:00	Brazil	3–1	France	25–20	26–24	19–25	25–23		95–92	P2 Report

=== Week 3 ===
==== Pool 5 ====
- All times are Pacific Daylight Time (UTC−07:00).

Date	Time		Score		Set 1	Set 2	Set 3	Set 4	Set 5	Total	Report
4 Jul	13:00	Argentina	3–1	Serbia	19–25	25–16	25–19	25–18		94–78	P2 Report
4 Jul	16:30	Iran	0–3	France	18–25	22–25	19–25			59–75	P2 Report
5 Jul	17:00	Germany	3–0	Bulgaria	25–22	25–18	25–22			75–62	P2 Report
5 Jul	20:30	United States	3–0	Cuba	27–25	25–17	25–15			77–57	P2 Report
6 Jul	13:30	Argentina	3–0	Germany	25–23	25–18	25–17			75–58	P2 Report
6 Jul	17:00	Serbia	3–2	Cuba	19–25	25–23	25–21	22–25	15–11	106–105	P2 Report
6 Jul	20:30	Bulgaria	3–2	Iran	21–25	25–21	22–25	25–22	15–11	108–104	P2 Report
7 Jul	13:30	Serbia	1–3	France	25–20	23–25	20–25	26–28		94–98	P2 Report
7 Jul	17:00	Cuba	0–3	Germany	23–25	23–25	22–25			68–75	P2 Report
7 Jul	20:30	United States	2–3	Argentina	18–25	25–23	25–23	41–43	12–15	121–129	P2 Report
8 Jul	13:30	Bulgaria	0–3	Serbia	19–25	22–25	22–25			63–75	P2 Report
8 Jul	17:00	Argentina	3–2	Iran	25–19	28–30	27–29	25–20	15–11	120–109	P2 Report
8 Jul	20:30	United States	3–0	France	25–23	27–25	27–25			79–73	P2 Report
9 Jul	13:30	Cuba	3–2	Iran	25–22	26–28	25–23	28–30	15–10	119–113	P2 Report
9 Jul	17:00	France	3–1	Germany	21–25	25–20	25–22	25–21		96–88	P2 Report
9 Jul	20:30	United States	3–0	Bulgaria	29–27	25–19	25–21			79–67	P2 Report

==== Pool 6 ====
- All times are Philippine Standard Time (UTC+08:00).

Date	Time		Score		Set 1	Set 2	Set 3	Set 4	Set 5	Total	Report
4 Jul	15:00	Brazil	1–3	Italy	25–23	20–25	15–25	21–25		81–98	P2 Report
4 Jul	19:00	Japan	3–2	China	24–26	25–23	21–25	25–23	15–12	110–109	P2 Report
5 Jul	15:00	Canada	1–3	Netherlands	22–25	22–25	25–17	18–25		87–92	P2 Report
5 Jul	19:00	Poland	3–2	Slovenia	29–31	21–25	25–20	25–20	15–13	115–109	P2 Report
6 Jul	11:00	Brazil	3–0	Netherlands	25–21	25–15	25–20			75–56	P2 Report
6 Jul	15:00	Canada	2–3	Italy	14–25	25–23	20–25	25–23	9–15	93–111	P2 Report
6 Jul	19:00	China	1–3	Slovenia	21–25	20–25	26–24	23–25		90–99	P2 Report
7 Jul	11:00	Poland	3–1	Brazil	25–23	22–25	25–21	25–21		97–90	P2 Report
7 Jul	15:00	Slovenia	0–3	Italy	13–25	22–25	17–25			52–75	P2 Report
7 Jul	19:00	Japan	3–1	Netherlands	25–19	26–24	23–25	25–17		99–85	P2 Report
8 Jul	11:00	Brazil	3–0	China	25–19	25–17	25–17			75–53	P2 Report
8 Jul	15:00	Poland	3–0	Canada	25–21	25–23	27–25			77–69	P2 Report
8 Jul	19:00	Japan	1–3	Italy	27–29	26–28	25–23	20–25		98–105	P2 Report
9 Jul	11:00	China	1–3	Canada	25–23	21–25	17–25	18–25		81–98	P2 Report
9 Jul	15:00	Slovenia	3–0	Netherlands	25–20	32–30	25–22			82–72	P2 Report
9 Jul	19:00	Japan	0–3	Poland	17–25	19–25	18–25			54–75	P2 Report

== Final round ==
- All times are Central European Summer Time (UTC+2:00).

Quarter-finals
19 July
United States	3
France	2
19 July
Italy	3
Argentina	0
20 July
Japan	3
Slovenia	0
20 July
Poland	3
Brazil	0

Semi-finals
22 July
United States	3
Italy	0
22 July
Japan	1
Poland	3

Final
23 July
United States	1
Poland	3
Third place match
23 July
Italy	2
Japan	3

=== Quarter-finals ===
Date	Time		Score		Set 1	Set 2	Set 3	Set 4	Set 5	Total	Report
19 Jul	17:00	United States	3–2	France	25–21	25–18	17–25	24–26	15–9	106–99	P2 Report
19 Jul	20:00	Italy	3–0	Argentina	25–17	25–13	25–14			75–44	P2 Report
20 Jul	17:00	Japan	3–0	Slovenia	26–24	25–18	25–22			76–64	P2 Report
20 Jul	20:00	Poland	3–0	Brazil	26–24	25–21	25–20			76–65	P2 Report

=== Semi-finals ===
Date	Time		Score		Set 1	Set 2	Set 3	Set 4	Set 5	Total	Report
22 Jul	17:00	Japan	1–3	Poland	25–19	26–28	17–25	21–25		89–97	P2 Report
22 Jul	20:00	United States	3–0	Italy	25–19	25–18	25–19			75–56	P2 Report

=== Third place match ===
Date	Time		Score		Set 1	Set 2	Set 3	Set 4	Set 5	Total	Report
23 Jul	17:00	Japan	3–2	Italy	25–18	25–23	17–25	17–25	15–9	99–100	P2 Report

=== Final ===
Date	Time		Score		Set 1	Set 2	Set 3	Set 4	Set 5	Total	Report
23 Jul	20:00	Poland	3–1	United States	25–23	24–26	25–18	25–18		99–85	P2 Report

== Final standing ==
Rank	Team
1st place, gold medalist(s)	Poland
2nd place, silver medalist(s)	United States
3rd place, bronze medalist(s)	Japan
4	Italy
5	Argentina
6	Brazil
7	Slovenia
8	France
9	Serbia
10	Netherlands
11	Germany
12	Canada
13	Cuba
14	Iran
15	Bulgaria
16	China

2023 Men's VNL champions

Poland
First title

14–man roster
Jakub Popiwczak, Łukasz Kaczmarek, Bartosz Kurek (c), Wilfredo León, Bartosz Bednorz, Aleksander Śliwka, Grzegorz Łomacz, Jakub Kochanowski, Kamil Semeniuk, Paweł Zatorski, Marcin Janusz, Mateusz Bieniek, Tomasz Fornal, Norbert Huber
Head coach
Nikola Grbić

== Awards ==
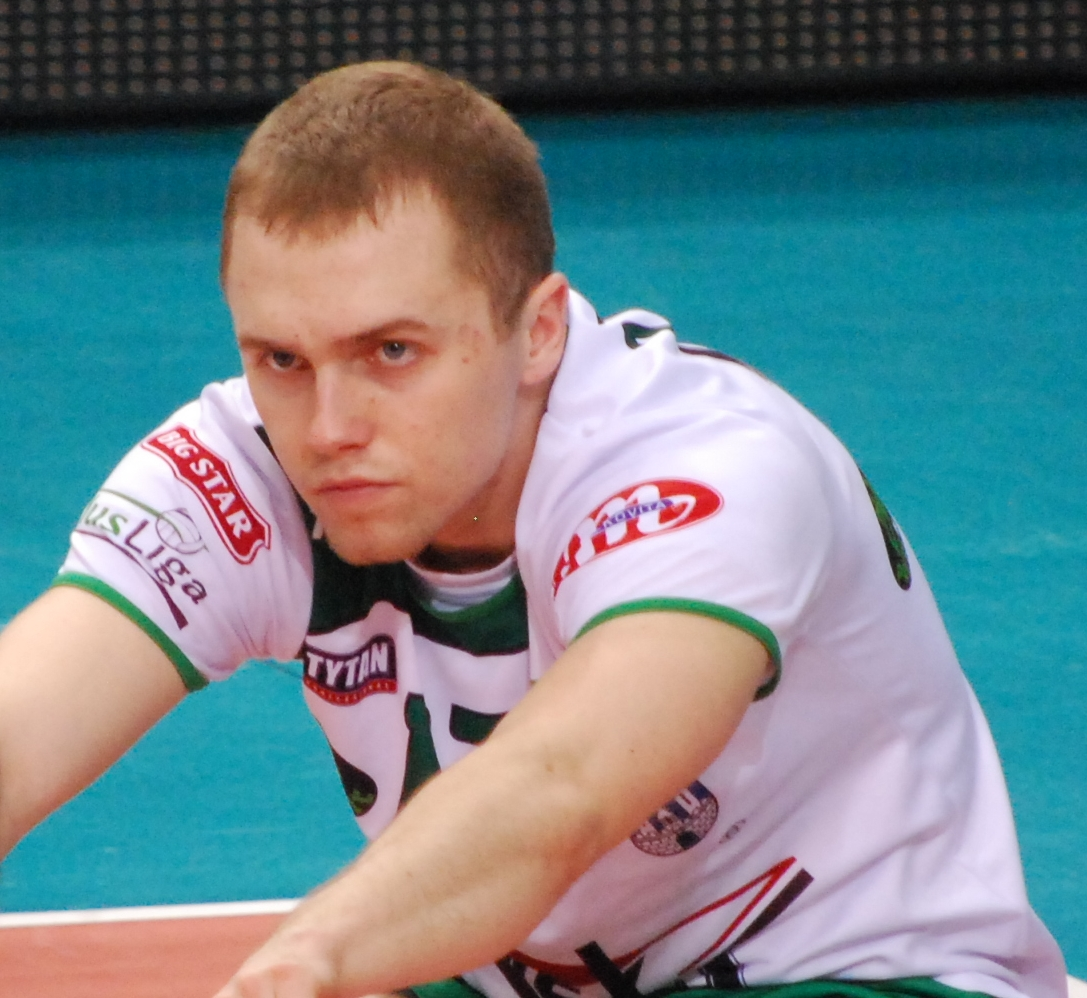
Paweł Zatorski was the 2023 FIVB Nations League Most Valuable Player.

- Most valuable player
  Paweł Zatorski (POL)
- Best setter
  Micah Christenson (USA)
- Best outside spikers
  Aleksander Śliwka (POL)
  Yūki Ishikawa (JPN)
- Best middle blockers
  Jakub Kochanowski (POL)
  David Smith (USA)
- Best opposite spiker
  Łukasz Kaczmarek (POL)
- Best libero
  Paweł Zatorski (POL)
- Fair play team award
  United States

== Statistics leaders ==
=== Preliminary round ===
Statistics leaders correct at the end of preliminary round.

Best Scorers (Note: Best scorers determined by scored points from spike, block and serve.)
	Player	Attacks	Blocks	Serves	Total
1	(Netherlands) Nimir Abdel-Aziz	184	8	25	217
2	(Cuba) Jesus Herrera Jaime	180	11	21	212
3	(Japan) Yuki Ishikawa	177	12	16	205
4	(China) Zhang Jingyin	162	22	17	201
5	(Serbia) Dražen Luburić	172	7	13	192

Best Attackers (Note: Best attackers determined by successful spikes.)
	Player	Spikes	Faults	Shots	%	Total
1	(Netherlands) Nimir Abdel-Aziz	184	66	105	51.83	355
2	(Cuba) Jesus Herrera Jaime	180	83	87	51.43	350
3	(Japan) Yuki Ishikawa	177	44	114	52.84	335
4	(Serbia) Dražen Luburić	172	66	118	48.86	352
5	(China) Zhang Jingyin	162	60	112	48.50	334

Best Blockers (Note: Best blockers determined by the stuff blocks, faults and rebounds.)
	Player	Blocks	Faults	Rebs	Avg	Total
1	(Argentina) Agustín Loser	51	61	44	4.25	156
2	(Iran) Mohammad Mousavi	35	55	38	2.92	128
3	(Cuba) Javier Concepción	29	61	49	2.42	139
4	(Serbia) Petar Krsmanović	29	41	28	2.42	98
5	(Serbia) Aleksandar Nedeljković	29	43	56	2.42	128

Best Servers (Note: Best servers determined by aces, faults and hits.)
	Player	Aces	Faults	Hits	Avg	Total
1	(Netherlands) Nimir Abdel-Aziz	25	52	101	2.08	179
2	(Italy) Yuri Romanò	21	39	108	1.75	168
3	(Cuba) Jesus Herrera Jaime	21	52	123	1.75	196
4	(Argentina) Luciano Palonsky	19	44	133	1.58	196
5	(Slovenia) Tine Urnaut	18	34	129	1.50	181

Best Setters (Note: Best setters determined by running setts, faults and still sets.)
	Player	Running	Faults	Still	Avg	Total
1	(Brazil) Bruno Rezende	230	6	595	19.17	831
3	(United States) Micah Christenson	225	3	406	18.75	634
3	(Argentina) Luciano De Cecco	223	4	505	27.88	732
4	(Japan) Masahiro Sekita	222	3	709	18.50	934
5	(Bulgaria) Georgi Seganov	215	6	596	17.92	817

Best Diggers (Note: Best diggers determined by successful digs, faults and receptions.)
	Player	Digs	Faults	Rept	Avg	Total
1	(Slovenia) Jani Kovačič	119	31	15	9.92	165
2	(Argentina) Santiago Danani	108	58	14	9.00	180
3	(Japan) Tomohiro Yamamoto	96	30	18	8.00	144
4	(France) Jenia Grebennikov	93	35	11	11.62	139
5	(Netherlands) Robbert Andringa	83	35	13	6.92	131

Best Receivers (Note: Best receivers determined by efficient receptions, faults and serve receptions.)
	Player	Excellents	Faults	Serve	%	Total
1	(Japan) Yuki Ishikawa	61	10	131	30.20	202
2	(Germany) Moritz Reichert	54	12	127	27.98	193
3	(France) Kévin Tillie	52	6	90	35.14	148
4	(Argentina) Santiago Danani	50	5	100	32.26	155
5	(Japan) Ran Takahashi	47	9	122	26.40	178

=== Final round ===
Statistics leaders correct at the end of final round.

Best Scorers
	Player	Attacks	Blocks	Serves	Total
1	(Japan) Yūki Ishikawa	60	5	5	70
2	(United States) Matthew Anderson	46	0	3	49
3	(Poland) Łukasz Kaczmarek	40	6	1	47
4	(Poland) Aleksander Śliwka	37	4	3	44
5	(United States) Thomas Jaeschke	33	6	2	41

Best Attackers
	Player	Spikes	Faults	Shots	%	Total
1	(Japan) Yūki Ishikawa	60	12	41	53.10	113
2	(United States) Matthew Anderson	46	9	29	54.76	84
3	(Poland) Łukasz Kaczmarek	40	7	21	58.82	68
4	(Poland) Aleksander Śliwka	37	7	18	59.68	62
5	(United States) Thomas Jaeschke	33	11	27	46.48	71

Best Blockers
	Player	Blocks	Faults	Rebounds	Avg	Total
1	(Italy) Roberto Russo	9	10	16	3.00	35
2	(Italy) Gianluca Galassi	7	15	14	2.33	36
3	(Poland) Wilfredo León	7	7	8	2.33	22
4	(United States) Maxwell Holt	6	13	15	2.00	34
5	(United States) Thomas Jaeschke	6	3	2	2.00	11

Best Servers
	Player	Aces	Faults	Hits	Avg	Total
1	(Poland) Mateusz Bieniek	8	6	33	2.67	47
2	(Japan) Kento Miyaura	7	7	27	2.33	41
3	(Italy) Alessandro Michieletto	5	5	35	1.67	45
4	(Italy) Gianluca Galassi	5	9	22	1.67	36
5	(Japan) Yūki Ishikawa	5	10	28	1.67	43

Best Setters
	Player	Running	Faults	Still	Avg	Total
1	(United States) Micah Christenson	100	0	156	33.33	256
2	(Italy) Simone Giannelli	75	1	151	25.00	227
3	(Japan) Masahiro Sekita	74	0	203	24.67	277
4	(Poland) Marcin Janusz	65	1	162	21.67	228
5	(France) Antoine Brizard	25	0	46	25.00	71

Best Diggers
	Player	Digs	Faults	Rept	Avg	Total
1	(Japan) Tomohiro Yamamoto	35	13	1	11.67	49
2	(Poland) Paweł Zatorski	26	8	3	8.67	37
3	(United States) Thomas Jaeschke	24	8	2	8.00	34
4	(United States) Erik Shoji	24	16	2	8.00	42
5	(Italy) Alessandro Michieletto	24	6	2	8.00	32

Best Receivers
	Player	Excellents	Faults	Serve	%	Total
1	(Japan) Ran Takahashi	16	5	42	25.40	63
2	(Italy) Fabio Balaso	15	3	35	28.30	53
3	(Japan) Tomohiro Yamamoto	15	2	36	28.30	53
4	(United States) Torey Defalco	13	5	42	21.67	60
5	(United States) Erik Shoji	12	4	34	24.00	50

== Controversies ==
=== Iran team's visa issues in the United States ===
After the announcement of the host venues and the games schedule, the president of the Iranian Volleyball Federation sent a letter to the FIVB expressing their concerns about the fact that the Iranian team is scheduled to play their games on the third week of the VNL in the USA territory. They stated that five members of the Iranian national team required further examination and additional documentation for visa issuance. The Iranian authorities also expressed their desire to host the USA's leg instead, or they might boycott the leg by not sending anyone to the USA.

The passports of the Iranian national team members were resubmitted to the US Embassy in Ankara, Turkey for a visa issuance. After necessary checks, visas were issued for the 12 players, with only four days left until the start of Week 3 of the VNL. However, five players including Amin Esmaeilnezhad were not granted visas. This situation also happened with the coach of the Iranian national team, Behrouz Ataei, who presented an incomplete documentation. After the second week round in Rotterdam, Netherlands, the rejected five players had to return to Tehran.

After failed negotiations with the American authorities, the FIVB Executive Committee specifically examined the question of the visas for the Iranian team and approved an unprecedented decision. If the United States government does not issue the visas to the key members of the Iranian team, the points of Iran and its opponents in the third week of the games would not be accounted for on the world rankings, but the results of these games would count exclusively for the tournament.

== See also ==
- 2023 FIVB Volleyball Men's Challenger Cup
