= FIVB Senior World Ranking system (until 2020) =

The FIVB world ranking system (until 2020) is a calculation technique previously used by Fédération Internationale de Volleyball (FIVB) for ranking men's and women's national teams in football. The ranking system was introduced by FIVB until 31 January 2020 as using for seeding teams participating 2020 Summer Olympics in Tokyo, Japan before an update to an earlier system, and was replaced during the 2020 FIVB Volleyball Nations League with a revised Elo-based system.

The system is still used in FIVB World Junior and Youth Rankings.

== Calculation method ==
The system of point attribution for the selected FIVB World and Official Competitions below is as follows:

- Olympic Games final and qualifying tournaments: included for 4 years and points are also granted for the qualification matches, to the best non-qualified teams.
- World Championship final and qualifying tournaments: included for 4 years and points are also granted for the qualification matches, to the best non-qualified teams.
- World Cup: included for 4 years
- World Grand Prix: included for 1 year
- World League: included for 1 year

=== Points for final qualifiers ===
Place	OG	WMCH	WWCH	WC	WL	WGP
1	100	100	100	100	50	50
2	90	90	90	90	45	45
3	80	80	80	80	42	42
4	70	70	70	70	40	40
5	62	62	58	50	38	38
6	56	56		40		
7	50	50	50	30	34	32
8	44			25	32	30
9	38	45	45	20	30	28
10	32			15	28	26
11	26	40	40	10	26	24
12	20			5	24	22
13		36	36		22	20
14					20	18
15		33	33		19	17
16					18	16
17		30	30		17	15
18					16	14
19					15	13
20					14	12
21		25	25		13	10
22					12	8
23					11	7
24					10	6
25					9	5
26					8	4
27					7	3
28					6	2
29					5	
30						
31					4	
32						
33					3	
34						
35					2	
36					1	

=== Points for teams eliminated ===
==== Men's World Championship ====
Place	AF	AS	EU	NO	SA
Q	0	0	0	0	0
PO-3				15	
PO-4				14	
R3-2			18		10
R3-3		14	15		9
R3-4	10	12	10		
R3-5	9	10	9		
R3-6	8		9	10	
R3-7	7			10	
R3-8	6				
R3-9	6				
R3-10	6				
R3-11	6				
R3-12	6				
R3-13	6				
R3-14	6				
R2-2		7			
R2-3		7	8		
R2-4			8		
R2-5			7		8
R2-6			7		7
R2-7					6
CA-3				8	
CA-4				8	
CA-5				7	
CA-6				7	
CA-7				6	
CA-8				6	
EC-2				8	
EC-3				7	
EC-4				6	
R1-2	5				
R1-3	5		6	5	
R1-4	5		5	5	
R1-5				5	
R1-6				5	
R1-7				5	

==== Women's World Championship ====
Place	AF	AS	EU	NO	SA
Q	0	0	0	0	0
R3-2					10
R3-3	10	14	18	10	9
R3-4	9	12	15	10	
R3-5	8	10	10		
R3-6	7		9		
R3-7	6				
R3-8	6				
R3-9	6				
R2-2		7			
R2-3		7	8		
R2-4			8		
R2-5			7		7
R2-6			7		6
CA-3				8	
CA-4				8	
CA-5				7	
CA-6				7	
CA-7				6	
CA-8				6	
EC-2				8	
EC-3				7	
EC-4				6	
R1-2	5				
R1-3	5		6	5	
R1-4	5		5	5	
R1-5				5	
R1-6				5	
R1-7				5	

==== Olympic Games ====
Place	IOQT	COQT
Q	0	0
1	10	10
2	8	8
3	8	8
4		5
5		5
4		5
6		5
7		5
8		5

=== Examples ===
These are example how world ranking works.

Team	Round	OG 2016		WGP 2017		WCH 2018		WC 2019		Total
Team	Round	Rank	Point	Rank	Point	Rank	Point	Rank	Point	Total
China	Final	1	100	4	40	3	80	1	100	320
China	Qualification	Q	0			Q	0			0
China	Total	1	100	4	40	3	80	1	100	320
Team	Round	OG 2016		WGP 2017		WCH 2018		WC 2019		Total
Team	Round	Rank	Point	Rank	Point	Rank	Point	Rank	Point	Total
Thailand	Final	DNQ	0	10	26	13	36	DNQ	0	62
Thailand	Qualification	WQ-1	3			Q	0			3
Thailand	Total	WQ-1	3	10	26	13	36	DNQ	0	65

== Notes and references ==
- Fédération Internationale de Volleyball (FIVB). "FIVB World Rankings".
