= 2022 FIVB Men's Volleyball Challenger Cup =

International volleyball tournament

서울 2022 FIVB 발리볼챌린저컵

Tournament details
- Host country: South Korea
- City: Seoul
- Dates: 28–31 July
- Teams: 8 (from 5 confederations)
- Venue: 1 (in 1 host city)

Final positions
- Champions: Cuba (1st title)
- Runners-up: Turkey
- Third place: South Korea
- Fourth place: Czech Republic

Tournament statistics
- Matches played: 8
- Attendance: 14,200 (1,775 per match)
- Best scorer: (Turkey) Adis Lagumdzija (64 points)
- Best spiker: (South Korea) Heo Su-bong (50.00%)
- Best blocker: (Turkey) Faik Samet Güneş (3.33 Avg)
- Best server: (Cuba) Osniel Melgarejo (2.00 Avg)
- Best digger: (Czech Republic) Milan Moník (9.00 Avg)
- Best receiver: (Czech Republic) Milan Moník (28.57%)

The 2022 FIVB Men's Volleyball Challenger Cup was the third edition of the FIVB Men's Volleyball Challenger Cup, an annual men's international volleyball tournament contested by eight national teams that acts as a qualifier for the FIVB Men's Volleyball Nations League. The tournament was held at Jamsil Students' Gymnasium in Seoul, South Korea, between 28 and 31 July 2022.

Four teams made their first appearance in the men's Challenger Cup in this edition: the host South Korea, Australia, Qatar and Tunisia.

Cuba won the title, defeating Turkey in the final, and earned the right to participate in 2023 Nations League replacing Australia, the last placed challenger team after the 2022 edition. South Korea defeated Czech Republic in the 3rd place match.

== Qualification ==
A total of 8 teams qualified for the tournament.

Country	Confederation	Qualified as	Qualified on	Previous appearances			Previous best performance
Country	Confederation	Qualified as	Qualified on	Total	First	Last	Previous best performance
Turkey	CEV	2021 European Golden League champions	20 June 2021	1	2019		4th place (2019)
Qatar	AVC	1st World ranked team from AVC	31 March 2022	0	None		None
Tunisia	CAVB	1st World ranked team from CAVB	31 March 2022	0	None		None
Chile	CSV	1st World ranked team from CSV	31 March 2022	2	2018	2019	5th place (2018)
Cuba	NORCECA	1st World ranked team from NORCECA	31 March 2022	2	2018	2019	Runners-up (2019)
South Korea	AVC	Host country	8 April 2022	0	None		None
Czech Republic	CEV	2022 European Golden League champions	18 June 2022	1	2018		Runners-up (2018)
Australia	AVC	2022 Nations League last placed challenger team	10 July 2022	0	None		None

== Format ==
The tournament will compete in the knock-out format (quarterfinals, semifinals, and final), with the host country (South Korea) playing its quarterfinal match against the lowest ranked team among the participating teams. The remaining seven teams are placed from 2nd to 8th positions as per the FIVB World Ranking as of 10 July 2022. Rankings are shown in brackets except the host.

Match	Top ranker	Bottom ranker
Quarterfinal 1	South Korea (Hosts)	Australia (38)
Quarterfinal 2	Cuba (13)	Chile (27)
Quarterfinal 3	Tunisia (15)	Czech Republic (24)
Quarterfinal 4	Turkey (17)	Qatar (21)

== Rule changes ==
1. Court switch at the end of the sets to be eliminated due to COVID-19 safety guidelines and for a better television broadcasts.
2. Each team is allowed to call only one time-out during each set in the preliminary. The time-out lasts 30 seconds long.
3. Only one technical time-out is made when the leading team reaches 12 points.

== Venue ==
All matches
Seoul, South Korea
Jamsil Students' Gymnasium
Capacity: 7,500

== Pool standing procedure ==
1. Number of matches won
2. Match points
3. Sets ratio
4. Points ratio
5. Result of the last match between the tied teams

Match won 3–0 or 3–1: 3 match points for the winner, 0 match points for the loser
Match won 3–2: 2 match points for the winner, 1 match point for the loser

== Knockout stage ==
- All times are Korea Standard Time (UTC+09:00).

Quarterfinals
28 July – Seoul
South Korea	3
Australia	2
29 July – Seoul
Turkey	3
Qatar	1
28 July – Seoul
Cuba	3
Chile	0
29 July – Seoul
Tunisia	1
Czech Republic	3

Semifinals
30 July – Seoul
South Korea	0
Turkey	3
30 July – Seoul
Cuba	3
Czech Republic	0

Final
31 July – Seoul
Turkey	1
Cuba	3
3rd place match
31 July – Seoul
South Korea	3
Czech Republic	2

=== Quarterfinals ===
Date	Time		Score		Set 1	Set 2	Set 3	Set 4	Set 5	Total	Report
28 Jul	15:30	Cuba	3–0	Chile	25–20	25–19	25–19			75–58	P2 Report
28 Jul	19:00	South Korea	3–2	Australia	23–25	25–23	25–18	22–25	15–13	110–104	P2 Report
29 Jul	12:00	Turkey	3–1	Qatar	25–23	25–16	22–25	25–15		97–79	P2 Report
29 Jul	15:30	Tunisia	1–3	Czech Republic	16–25	25–17	26–28	16–25		83–95	P2 Report

=== Semifinals ===
Date	Time		Score		Set 1	Set 2	Set 3	Set 4	Set 5	Total	Report
30 Jul	12:00	Cuba	3–0	Czech Republic	25–22	25–18	25–18			75–58	P2 Report
30 Jul	15:30	South Korea	0–3	Turkey	24–26	21–25	22–25			67–76	P2 Report

=== 3rd place match ===
Date	Time		Score		Set 1	Set 2	Set 3	Set 4	Set 5	Total	Report
31 Jul	12:00	South Korea	3–2	Czech Republic	25–19	25–16	24–26	23–25	22–20	119–106	P2 Report

=== Final ===
Date	Time		Score		Set 1	Set 2	Set 3	Set 4	Set 5	Total	Report
31 Jul	15:45	Turkey	1–3	Cuba	17–25	25–23	20–25	20–25		82–98	P2 Report

== Final standing ==
Rank	Team
1st place, gold medalist(s)	Cuba
2nd place, silver medalist(s)	Turkey
3rd place, bronze medalist(s)	South Korea
4	Czech Republic
5	Australia
6	Tunisia
7	Qatar
8	Chile

Qualified for the 2023 Nations League

Source: VCC 2022 final standings

2022 Men's Challenger Cup champions

Cuba
1st title

12–man Roster
Osniel Melgarejo, Julio Cardenas, Michael Sánchez, Javier Concepción, Yonder García, Miguel Gutiérrez, Lyvan Taboada, Jesús Herrera, Adrián Goide, Roamy Alonso, Miguel Ángel López (c), Marlon Yant
Head coach
Nicolas Vives

== See also ==
- 2022 FIVB Men's Volleyball Nations League
- 2022 FIVB Women's Volleyball Challenger Cup
- 2022 FIVB Women's Volleyball Nations League
