= 2019 FIVB Men's Volleyball Challenger Cup =

International volleyball tournament

Pokal FIVB Odbojka Challenger Slovenija 2019

Tournament details
- Host country: Slovenia
- City: Ljubljana
- Dates: 3–7 July
- Teams: 6 (from 4 confederations)
- Venue: 1 (in 1 host city)

Final positions
- Champions: Slovenia (1st title)
- Runners-up: Cuba
- Third place: Belarus
- Fourth place: Turkey

Tournament statistics
- Matches played: 10
- Attendance: 3,480 (348 per match)
- Best scorer: (Belarus) Pavel Kuklinski (71 points)
- Best spiker: (Cuba) Marlon Yant (59.38%)
- Best blocker: (Belarus) Siarhei Busel (0.76 Avg)
- Best server: (Belarus) Kanstantsin Tsiushkevich (0.88 Avg)
- Best setter: (Slovenia) Gregor Ropret (6.21 Avg)
- Best digger: (Chile) Sebastian Castillo (2.17 Avg)
- Best receiver: (Chile) Sebastian Castillo (24.39%)

The 2019 FIVB Men's Volleyball Challenger Cup was the second edition of the FIVB Men's Volleyball Challenger Cup, an annual men's international volleyball tournament contested by six national teams that acts as a qualifier for the FIVB Men's Volleyball Nations League. The tournament was held in Ljubljana, Slovenia from 3 to 7 July 2019.

Slovenia won the title, defeating Cuba in the final, and earned the right to participate in the 2020 Nations League replacing Portugal, the last placed challenger team after the 2019 edition. Belarus defeated Turkey in the 3rd place match.

On 8 May 2020, FIVB announced that the 2020 Nations League and 2020 Challenger Cup was canceled due to COVID-19 pandemic. So the tournament eventually became the 2021 Nations League qualifier.

== Qualification ==
A total of 6 teams qualified for the tournament.

Country	Confederation	Qualified as	Qualified on	Previous appearances			Previous best performance
Country	Confederation	Qualified as	Qualified on	Total	First	Last	Previous best performance
Slovenia	CEV	Host country	December 2018	0	None		None
Cuba	NORCECA	North American Qualifier winners	1 June 2019	1	2018		4th place (2018)
Egypt	CAVB	1st World ranked team from CAVB	12 June 2019	0	None		None
Chile^{1}	CSV	2019 Pan-American Cup best finishing team from CSV	21 June 2019	1	2018		5th place (2018)
Belarus	CEV	2019 European Golden League runners-up	21 June 2019	0	None		None
Turkey	CEV	2019 European Golden League champions	21 June 2019	0	None		None

1.Originally, the representatives from AVC and CSV would play a playoff for a spot. But, South Korea, chosen by FIVB, refused to represent the AVC. So the AVC–CSV playoff was canceled and the representatives from CSV booked a direct qualification.

== Pools composition ==
Teams were seeded following the serpentine system according to their FIVB World Ranking as of 1 October 2018. FIVB reserved the right to seed the hosts as head of pool A regardless of the World Ranking. Not more than two teams from the same Continental Confederation can go into a same pool. In case the third team from the same Continental Confederation is placed in the same pool as per the World Ranking, the third team will move to the other pool. Rankings are shown in brackets except the hosts who ranked 17th.

Pool A	Pool B
Slovenia (Hosts)	Egypt (13)
Turkey (33)	Cuba (18)
Chile (37)	Belarus (48)

== Venue ==
All matches
Ljubljana, Slovenia
Arena Stožice
Capacity: 12,480

== Pool standing procedure ==
1. Number of matches won
2. Match points
3. Sets ratio
4. Points ratio
5. Result of the last match between the tied teams

Match won 3–0 or 3–1: 3 match points for the winner, 0 match points for the loser
Match won 3–2: 2 match points for the winner, 1 match point for the loser

== Preliminary round ==
- All times are Central European Summer Time (UTC+02:00).

=== Pool A ===
Pos	Team	Pld	W	L	Pts	SW	SL	SR	SPW	SPL	SPR	Qualification
1	Slovenia	2	2	0	6	6	1	6.000	173	122	1.418	Semifinals
2	Turkey	2	1	1	3	4	3	1.333	148	155	0.955	Semifinals
3	Chile	2	0	2	0	0	6	0.000	106	150	0.707	

Date	Time		Score		Set 1	Set 2	Set 3	Set 4	Set 5	Total	Report
3 Jul	20:40	Slovenia	3–0	Chile	25–15	25–15	25–19			75–49	P2 Report
4 Jul	20:30	Turkey	3–0	Chile	25–13	25–22	25–22			75–57	P2 Report
5 Jul	20:40	Slovenia	3–1	Turkey	23–25	25–16	25–15	25–17		98–73	P2 Report

=== Pool B ===
Pos	Team	Pld	W	L	Pts	SW	SL	SR	SPW	SPL	SPR	Qualification
1	Cuba	2	2	0	5	6	3	2.000	206	184	1.120	Semifinals
2	Belarus	2	1	1	2	4	5	0.800	193	195	0.990	Semifinals
3	Egypt	2	0	2	2	4	6	0.667	197	217	0.908	

Date	Time		Score		Set 1	Set 2	Set 3	Set 4	Set 5	Total	Report
3 Jul	17:30	Egypt	2–3	Belarus	25–21	16–25	25–20	24–26	9–15	99–107	P2 Report
4 Jul	17:30	Cuba	3–1	Belarus	25–20	21–25	25–21	25–20		96–86	P2 Report
5 Jul	17:30	Egypt	2–3	Cuba	23–25	18–25	25–23	25–22	7–15	98–110	P2 Report

== Final round ==
- All times are Central European Summer Time (UTC+02:00).

Semifinals
6 July – Ljubljana
Cuba	3
Turkey	2
6 July – Ljubljana
Slovenia	3
Belarus	1

Final
7 July – Ljubljana
Cuba	0
Slovenia	3
3rd place match
7 July – Ljubljana
Turkey	1
Belarus	3

=== Semifinals ===
Date	Time		Score		Set 1	Set 2	Set 3	Set 4	Set 5	Total	Report
6 Jul	17:30	Cuba	3–2	Turkey	22–25	25–23	25–22	20–25	15–12	107–107	P2 Report
6 Jul	20:45	Slovenia	3–1	Belarus	21–25	27–25	25–20	25–18		98–88	P2 Report

=== Third place match ===
Date	Time		Score		Set 1	Set 2	Set 3	Set 4	Set 5	Total	Report
7 Jul	17:30	Turkey	1–3	Belarus	20–25	25–20	16–25	20–25		81–95	P2 Report

=== Final ===
Date	Time		Score		Set 1	Set 2	Set 3	Set 4	Set 5	Total	Report
7 Jul	20:30	Cuba	0–3	Slovenia	24–26	21–25	21–25			66–76	P2 Report

== Final standing ==
Rank	Team
1st place, gold medalist(s)	Slovenia
2nd place, silver medalist(s)	Cuba
3rd place, bronze medalist(s)	Belarus
4	Turkey
5	Egypt
6	Chile

Qualified for the 2021 Nations League

Source: VCC 2019 final standings

2019 Men's Challenger Cup champions

Slovenia
1st title

14–man Roster
Tonček Štern, Alen Pajenk, Jan Kozamernik, Alen Šket, Mitja Gasparini, Dejan Vinčić, Sašo Štalekar, Žiga Štern, Jani Kovačič, Urban Toman, Matic Videčnik, Gregor Ropret, Tine Urnaut (c), Klemen Čebulj
Head coach
Alberto Giuliani

== See also ==
- 2019 FIVB Men's Volleyball Nations League
- 2019 FIVB Women's Volleyball Challenger Cup
