= 2024 FIVB Men's Volleyball Challenger Cup squads =

This article shows the roster of all the participating teams at the 2024 FIVB Men's Volleyball Challenger Cup.

== Belgium ==
The following are Belgium's roster at the 2024 FIVB Men's Volleyball Challenger Cup.

Head coach: (Italy) Emanuele Zanini

- 1 Jolan Cox OP
- 2 Ferre Reggers OP
- 6 Simon Plaskie OH
- 8 Michiel Fransen OH
- 9 Wout D'Heer MB
- 11 Seppe van Hoyweghen S
- 12 Seppe Rotty OH
- 13 Kobe Verwimp L
- 16 Robbe Ponseele S
- 20 Robbe van de Velde OH
- 23 Pierre Perin OH
- 26 Bert Dufraing L
- 28 Milan Dalli Cardillo MB
- 29 Mauro Lips MB

== Chile ==
The following are Chile's roster at the 2024 FIVB Men's Volleyball Challenger Cup.

Head coach: (Argentina) Daniel Nejamkin

- 1 Estebán Villarreal S
- 2 Vicente Ibarra OH
- 3 Gabriel Araya MB
- 5 Vicente Parraguirre OH
- 6 Tomás Gago MB
- 8 Sebastián Albornoz S
- 9 Dusan Bonacic OH
- 10 Vicente Mardones MB
- 11 Matías Jadue OH
- 15 Sebastián Castillo L
- 16 Vicente Valenzuela MB
- 17 Jaime Bravo L
- 18 Kaj Bonacic Brogh OH
- 22 Bastián Fuentes MB

== China ==
The following are China's roster at the 2024 FIVB Men's Volleyball Challenger Cup.

Head coach: (Belgium) Vital Heynen

- 2 Jiang Chuan OP
- 3 Wang Hebin S
- 4 Li Lei OH
- 6 Yu Yuantai OH
- 8 Wang Dongchen MB
- 9 Li Yongzhen MB
- 10 Yang Tianyuan L
- 14 Zhai Dejun OH
- 15 Peng Shikun MB
- 16 Qu Zongshuai L
- 17 Wang Jingyi OP
- 20 Rao Shuhan MB
- 22 Zhang Jingyin OH
- 30 Mao Tianyi S

== Croatia ==
The following are Croatia's roster at the 2024 FIVB Men's Volleyball Challenger Cup.

Head coach: Igor Juričić

- 1 Petar Višić S
- 4 Kruno Nikačević MB
- 6 Bernard Bakonji S
- 7 Marko Sedlaček OH
- 8 Sven Jakopec MB
- 9 Roko Vlašić OH
- 10 Filip Šestan OH
- 11 Petar Đirlić OP
- 13 Hrvoje Pervan L
- 15 Tomislav Mitrašinović OP
- 18 Marko Repek L
- 19 Ivan Zeljković OH
- 20 Gabrijel Cvanciger OP
- 22 Ivan Mandura MB

== Egypt ==
The following are Egypt's roster at the 2024 FIVB Men's Volleyball Challenger Cup.

Head coach: (Spain) Fernando Muñoz

- 2 Ahmed Azab Abdelrahman OH
- 5 Mohamed Osman Elhaddad MB
- 6 Mohamed Hassan L
- 7 Mohamed Noureldin Ramadan L
- 8 Abdelrahman Elhossiny Eissa OH
- 9 Mohamed Sayedin Asran OH
- 10 Mohamed Masoud MB
- 12 Hossam Abdalla S
- 13 Mohamed Khater El Mahdy MB
- 14 Seifeldin Hassan Aly OP
- 16 Mostafa Gaber Abdelsalam Abdelmoaty S
- 17 Reda Haikal OP
- 22 Mohamed Moustafa Issa OH
- 23 Ahmed Omar OH

== Mexico ==
The following are Mexico's roster at the 2024 FIVB Men's Volleyball Challenger Cup.

Head coach: (Brazil) Carlos Schwanke

- 2 Jorge Hernández Cabrera OH
- 3 Hiram Bravo Moreno L
- 5 Victor Parra Valenzuela MB
- 8 Edgar Mendoza Burgueño S
- 9 Axel Téllez Rodríguez MB
- 10 Yasutaka Sanay Heredia OH
- 11 Brandon López Ríos MB
- 12 Mauro Fuentes Rascón OH
- 13 Juan Salvador García Ayala MB
- 22 Ángel Domínguez Carrillo OP
- 23 Luis Sánchez López L
- 33 Leonardo Maldonado Díaz OP
- 48 Franky Hernández Milantony OP
- 96 Miguel Ángel García Reséndiz S

== Qatar ==
The following are Qatar's roster at the 2024 FIVB Men's Volleyball Challenger Cup.

Head coach: (Argentina) Camilo Soto

- 1 Youssef Oughlaf OH
- 2 Papemaguette Diagne MB
- 4 Yousef Alyafeai OP
- 5 Sultan Abdalla S
- 6 Borislav Georgiev S
- 7 Belal Abunabot MB
- 8 Mohamed Waleed Widatalla OH
- 9 Moubarak Al-Kuwari OH
- 10 Ghanim Mohammed Al-Remaihi L
- 11 Nikola Vasić OH
- 18 Ahmed Abdelwahab OH
- 20 Abdulwahid Osman MB
- 22 Abdelrahman Bakry OP
- 23 Mohammed Alsharshani L

== Ukraine ==
The following are Ukraine's roster at the 2024 FIVB Men's Volleyball Challenger Cup.

Head coach: (Argentina) Raúl Lozano

- 6 Maksym Drozd MB
- 9 Viktor Shapoval OP
- 12 Serhii Yevstratov S
- 15 Yaroslav Pampushko L
- 16 Dmytro Dolgopolov S
- 18 Tymur Tsmokalo MB
- 20 Oleksandr Nalozhnyi OH
- 21 Yevhenii Kisiliuk OH
- 22 Mykola Dzhul L
- 30 Andrii Chelenyak MB
- 42 Danylo Uryvkin OP
- 88 Oleksandr Koval MB
- 97 Mykyta Luban OP
- 99 Mykola Kuts MB

== See also ==
- 2024 FIVB Women's Volleyball Challenger Cup squads
