= FIVB Men's Volleyball Nations League statistics =

This article gives the summarized final standings of each FIVB Men's Volleyball Nations League tournament, an annual competition involving national men's volleyball teams.

After the tournament's eighth edition and as of 2026, most successful team is Poland with 7 medals in total, 3 golds (2023, 2025, 2026), one silver (2021) and 3 bronze medals (2019, 2022, 2024). France won two gold (2022, 2024), a silver (2018) and a bronze (2021), Russia has won two golds (2018, 2019) Brazil one gold (2021) and one bronze medals (2025).United States has won fourth silvers (2019, 2022, 2023, 2026) and a bronze (2018), while Japan has won a silver (2024) and bronze (2023), Italy has won silver (2025), Slovenia has won bronze medal (2026).

== Results summary ==
=== 2018 FIVB Volleyball Nations League statistics ===
==== Squads ====
The 16 national teams involved in the tournament were required to register a squad of 21 players, which every week's 14-player roster must be selected from. Each country must declare its 14-player roster two days before the start of each week's round-robin competition.

==== Preliminary round ====
Pos	Team	Pld	W	L	Pts	SW	SL	SR	SPW	SPL	SPR	Qualification or relegation
1	France (Note: Qualified as hosts)	15	12	3	35	38	16	2.375	1295	1140	1.136	Final round
2	Russia	15	11	4	34	36	14	2.571	1191	1096	1.087	Final round
3	United States	15	11	4	33	37	19	1.947	1294	1183	1.094	Final round
4	Serbia	15	11	4	29	33	24	1.375	1289	1255	1.027	Final round
5	Brazil	15	10	5	30	34	21	1.619	1280	1213	1.055	Final round
6	Poland	15	10	5	29	32	19	1.684	1221	1124	1.086	Final round
7	Canada	15	8	7	25	29	24	1.208	1219	1227	0.993	
8	Italy	15	8	7	24	30	28	1.071	1315	1296	1.015	
9	Germany	15	7	8	23	29	30	0.967	1299	1307	0.994	
10	Iran	15	7	8	21	29	30	0.967	1355	1344	1.008	
11	Bulgaria	15	6	9	17	26	34	0.765	1288	1351	0.953	
12	Japan	15	6	9	15	23	37	0.622	1301	1374	0.947	
13	Australia	15	5	10	15	21	35	0.600	1236	1340	0.922	
14	Argentina	15	4	11	15	23	34	0.676	1270	1326	0.958	
15	China	15	3	12	9	15	39	0.385	1173	1291	0.909	
16	South Korea	15	1	14	6	11	42	0.262	1108	1267	0.875	Excluded from 2019 Nations League

Source: VNL 2018 standings

==== Final round 2018 ====
Pos	Team	Pld	W	L	Pts	SW	SL	SR	SPW	SPL	SPR	Result
1st place, gold medalist(s)	Russia	4	4	0	12	12	1	12.000	322	261	1.234	Champions
2nd place, silver medalist(s)	France (H)	4	3	1	7	9	7	1.286	360	333	1.081	Runners up
3rd place, bronze medalist(s)	United States	4	2	2	7	8	6	1.333	322	321	1.003	Third place
4	Brazil	4	1	3	4	5	9	0.556	305	325	0.938	Fourth place
5	Poland	2	0	2	0	1	6	0.167	144	175	0.823	Eliminated in pool play
6	Serbia	2	0	2	0	0	6	0.000	115	153	0.752	Eliminated in pool play

Source: VNL 2018 finals
(H) Host

==== Final four ====
Semi-finals
7 July
France	3
United States	2
7 July
Russia	3
Brazil	0

Final
8 July
France	0
Russia	3
Third place match
8 July
United States	3
Brazil	0

=== 2019 FIVB Volleyball Nations League statistics ===
==== Squads ====
The 16 national teams involved in the tournament were required to register a squad of 25 players, which every week's 14-player roster must be selected from. Each country must declare its 14-player roster two days before the start of each week's round-robin competition.

==== Preliminary round ====
Pos	Team	Pld	W	L	Pts	SW	SL	SR	SPW	SPL	SPR	Qualification or relegation
1	Brazil	15	14	1	39	44	15	2.933	1408	1218	1.156	Final round
2	Iran	15	12	3	36	38	15	2.533	1276	1173	1.088	Final round
3	Russia	15	12	3	34	37	17	2.176	1284	1164	1.103	Final round
4	France	15	11	4	34	38	18	2.111	1341	1251	1.072	Final round
5	Poland	15	11	4	30	38	25	1.520	1465	1397	1.049	Final round
6	United States (Note: Qualified as hosts)	15	9	6	28	32	24	1.333	1317	1258	1.047	Final round
7	Argentina	15	8	7	26	33	26	1.269	1363	1304	1.045	
8	Italy	15	8	7	25	31	25	1.240	1316	1263	1.042	
9	Canada	15	8	7	23	29	29	1.000	1313	1321	0.994	
10	Japan	15	7	8	19	27	32	0.844	1318	1326	0.994	
11	Serbia	15	6	9	17	28	36	0.778	1393	1417	0.983	
12	Bulgaria	15	5	10	13	21	38	0.553	1268	1372	0.924	
13	Australia	15	3	12	13	20	37	0.541	1217	1334	0.912	
14	Germany	15	3	12	12	23	41	0.561	1349	1470	0.918	
15	Portugal	15	2	13	7	12	40	0.300	1095	1268	0.864	Excluded from Nations League
16	China	15	1	14	4	9	42	0.214	1047	1234	0.848	

Source: VNL 2019 Preliminary Round Standings

==== Final round 2019 ====
Pos	Team	Pld	W	L	Pts	SW	SL	SR	SPW	SPL	SPR	Result
1st place, gold medalist(s)	Russia	4	3	1	9	9	5	1.800	327	308	1.062	Champions
2nd place, silver medalist(s)	United States (H)	4	3	1	8	10	6	1.667	365	337	1.083	Runners up
3rd place, bronze medalist(s)	Poland	4	3	1	8	10	6	1.667	368	348	1.057	
4	Brazil	4	1	3	4	7	11	0.636	373	391	0.954	Fourth place
5	Iran	2	0	2	1	3	6	0.500	189	205	0.922	Eliminated in pool play
6	France	2	0	2	0	1	6	0.167	140	173	0.809	Eliminated in pool play

Source: VNL 2019 finals
(H) Host

==== Final four ====
Semifinals
13 July
Poland	1
Russia	3
13 July
United States	3
Brazil	1

Final
14 July
Russia	3
United States	1
3rd place match
14 July
Poland	3
Brazil	0

=== 2021 FIVB Volleyball Nations League statistics ===
==== Squads ====
The 16 teams compete in a round-robin format. The teams play 3 matches each week and compete five weeks long, for 120 matches. The top four teams after the preliminary round compete in the final round.

==== Preliminary round ====
Pos	Team	Pld	W	L	Pts	SW	SL	SR	SPW	SPL	SPR	Qualification
1	Brazil	15	13	2	38	39	12	3.250	1260	1102	1.143	Final round
2	Poland	15	12	3	37	39	11	3.545	1200	985	1.218	Final round
3	Slovenia	15	12	3	34	40	18	2.222	1342	1222	1.098	Final round
4	France	15	11	4	34	41	22	1.864	1472	1382	1.065	Final round
5	Russia	15	11	4	34	39	21	1.857	1380	1293	1.067	
6	Serbia	15	10	5	28	35	27	1.296	1419	1341	1.058	
7	United States	15	8	7	24	29	24	1.208	1239	1159	1.069	
8	Canada	15	7	8	21	27	26	1.038	1198	1170	1.024	
9	Argentina	15	7	8	20	23	29	0.793	1188	1222	0.972	
10	Italy (H)	15	7	8	19	28	33	0.848	1335	1345	0.993	
11	Japan	15	7	8	19	25	31	0.806	1226	1266	0.968	
12	Iran	15	5	10	18	25	32	0.781	1286	1349	0.953	
13	Germany	15	4	11	14	22	38	0.579	1255	1360	0.923	
14	Netherlands	15	3	12	11	19	40	0.475	1214	1354	0.897	
15	Bulgaria	15	2	13	7	11	41	0.268	1037	1238	0.838	
16	Australia	15	1	14	2	7	44	0.159	980	1243	0.788	

Source: VNL 2021 standings
(H) Host

==== Final round 2021 ====
Pos	Team	Pld	W	L	Pts	SW	SL	SR	SPW	SPL	SPR	Result
1st place, gold medalist(s)	Brazil	2	2	0	6	6	1	6.000	172	135	1.274	Champions
2nd place, silver medalist(s)	Poland	2	1	1	3	4	3	1.333	153	163	0.939	Runners up
3rd place, bronze medalist(s)	France	2	1	1	3	3	3	1.000	132	132	1.000	Third place
4	Slovenia	2	0	2	0	0	6	0.000	123	150	0.820	Fourth place

Source: VNL 2021 finals

==== Final four ====
Semi-finals
26 June
Brazil	3
France	0
26 June
Poland	3
Slovenia	0

Final
27 June
Brazil	3
Poland	1
Third place match
27 June
France	3
Slovenia	0

==== Tournament statistics ====
- Matches played : 124
- Attendance : 0 no spectators due to COVID-19 pandemic.

=== 2022 FIVB Volleyball Nations League statistics ===
==== Squads ====
As there was no promotion or relegation in the 2021 VNL, 15 of the same 16 teams in 2021 are competing in this year's edition.

==== Preliminary round ====
In the 2022 tournament, the format of play was changed. The new format will see 16 men's teams competing in pools of 8 teams during the pool phase. Eight teams will then move into the final knockout phase of the competition.

Pos	Team	Pld	W	L	Pts	SW	SL	SR	SPW	SPL	SPR	Qualification or relegation
1	Italy (Note: Qualified as hosts)	12	10	2	31	32	9	3.556	986	872	1.131	Final round
2	Poland	12	10	2	31	33	10	3.300	1031	898	1.148	Final round
3	United States	12	10	2	27	31	16	1.938	1102	975	1.130	Final round
4	France	12	9	3	28	31	11	2.818	994	826	1.203	Final round
5	Japan	12	9	3	27	29	18	1.611	1092	997	1.095	Final round
6	Brazil	12	8	4	24	26	14	1.857	960	881	1.090	Final round
7	Iran	12	7	5	20	22	19	1.158	961	923	1.041	Final round
8	Netherlands	12	6	6	17	20	21	0.952	915	932	0.982	Final round
9	Argentina	12	5	7	18	24	26	0.923	1110	1117	0.994	
10	Slovenia	12	5	7	15	18	24	0.750	917	963	0.952	
11	Serbia	12	5	7	14	19	27	0.704	1010	1043	0.968	
12	Germany	12	4	8	10	18	29	0.621	969	1103	0.879	
13	China	12	3	9	9	14	28	0.500	840	951	0.883	
14	Bulgaria	12	2	10	9	16	31	0.516	990	1087	0.911	
15	Canada	12	2	10	6	10	33	0.303	887	1022	0.868	
16	Australia	12	1	11	2	8	35	0.229	858	1032	0.831	2022 Challenger Cup

Source: VNL 2022 standings

==== Final round 2022 ====
The VNL Finals will see the seven strongest teams along with the finals host country Italy moving directly to the knockout phase which will consist of eight matches in total: four quarterfinals, two semi-finals and the bronze and gold medal matches.

Pos	Team	Pld	W	L	Pts	SW	SL	SR	SPW	SPL	SPR	Result
1st place, gold medalist(s)	France	3	3	0	8	9	2	4.500	252	212	1.189	Champions
2nd place, silver medalist(s)	United States	3	2	1	7	8	4	2.000	265	246	1.077	Runners up
3rd place, bronze medalist(s)	Poland	3	2	1	5	6	5	1.200	238	231	1.030	Third place
4	Italy (H)	3	1	2	3	3	7	0.429	212	232	0.914	Fourth place
5	Japan	1	0	1	0	0	3	0.000	60	76	0.789	Eliminated in quarterfinals
6	Brazil	1	0	1	0	1	3	0.333	87	95	0.916	Eliminated in quarterfinals
7	Iran	1	0	1	1	2	3	0.667	97	105	0.924	Eliminated in quarterfinals
8	Netherlands	1	0	1	0	1	3	0.333	82	96	0.854	Eliminated in quarterfinals

Source: VNL 2022 finals
(H) Host

==== Final eighth ====
Quarter-finals
20 July
Italy	3
Netherlands	1
21 July
France	3
Japan	0
21 July
Poland	3
Iran	2
20 July
United States	3
Brazil	1

Semi-finals
23 July
Italy	0
France	3
23 July
Poland	0
United States	3

Final
24 July
France	3
United States	2
Third place match
24 July
Italy	0
Poland	3

=== 2023 FIVB Volleyball Nations League statistics ===
==== Preliminary round ====
The format of play is the same as edition 2022. The new format will see 16 men's teams competing in pools of 8 teams during the pool phase. Each team plays 12 matches during the pool stage. Eight teams will then move into the final knockout phase of the competition.

Pos	Team	Pld	W	L	Pts	SW	SL	SR	SPW	SPL	SPR	Qualification or relegation
1	United States	12	10	2	31	33	7	4.714	986	871	1.132	Final round
2	Japan	12	10	2	27	31	16	1.938	1109	1034	1.073	Final round
3	Poland (Note: Qualified as hosts)	12	10	2	25	30	19	1.579	1108	1057	1.048	Final round
4	Italy	12	9	3	26	28	15	1.867	1016	906	1.121	Final round
5	Argentina	12	9	3	26	32	18	1.778	1184	1092	1.084	Final round
6	Brazil	12	8	4	25	30	18	1.667	1108	1033	1.073	Final round
7	Slovenia	12	8	4	25	27	17	1.588	1036	997	1.039	Final round
8	France	12	6	6	18	23	21	1.095	1046	1007	1.039	Final round
9	Serbia	12	6	6	16	23	23	1.000	1045	1056	0.990	
10	Netherlands	12	5	7	17	22	24	0.917	1028	1054	0.975	
11	Germany	12	3	9	10	16	28	0.571	963	1036	0.930	
12	Canada	12	3	9	9	15	31	0.484	983	1074	0.915	
13	Cuba	12	3	9	8	15	33	0.455	1023	1119	0.914	
14	Iran	12	2	10	11	16	31	0.516	995	1073	0.927	
15	Bulgaria	12	2	10	8	13	32	0.406	957	1045	0.916	
16	China	12	2	10	6	12	33	0.364	941	1074	0.876	2023 Challenger Cup

Source: VNL 2023 Preliminary Phase

==== Final round 2023 ====
The VNL Finals will see the seven strongest teams along with the finals host country Poland moving directly to the knockout phase which will consist of eight matches in total: four quarterfinals, two semi-finals and the bronze and gold medal matches.

Pos	Team	Pld	W	L	Pts	SW	SL	SR	SPW	SPL	SPR	Result
1st place, gold medalist(s)	Poland (H)	3	3	0	9	9	2	4.500	272	239	1.138	Champions
2nd place, silver medalist(s)	United States	3	2	1	5	7	5	1.400	266	254	1.047	Runners up
3rd place, bronze medalist(s)	Japan	3	2	1	5	7	5	1.400	264	261	1.011	Third place
4	Italy	3	1	2	4	5	6	0.833	231	218	1.060	Fourth place
5	Argentina	1	0	1	0	0	3	0.000	44	75	0.587	Eliminated in quarterfinals
6	Brazil	1	0	1	0	0	3	0.000	65	76	0.855	Eliminated in quarterfinals
7	Slovenia	1	0	1	0	0	3	0.000	64	76	0.842	Eliminated in quarterfinals
8	France	1	0	1	1	2	3	0.667	99	106	0.934	Eliminated in quarterfinals

Source: VNL 2023 finals
(H) Host

==== Final eighth ====
Quarter-finals
19 July
United States	3
France	2
19 July
Italy	3
Argentina	0
20 July
Japan	3
Slovenia	0
20 July
Poland	3
Brazil	0

Semi-finals
22 July
United States	3
Italy	0
22 July
Japan	1
Poland	3

Final
23 July
United States	1
Poland	3
Third place match
23 July
Italy	2
Japan	3

=== 2024 FIVB Volleyball Nations League statistics ===
==== Preliminary round ====
The format of play is the same as the 2022 edition. The new format see 16 men's teams competing in pools of 8 teams during the pool phase. Each team plays 12 matches during the pool stage. Eight teams will then move into the final knockout phase of the competition.

Pos	Team	Pld	W	L	Pts	SW	SL	SR	SPW	SPL	SPR	Qualification
1	Slovenia	12	11	1	28	34	14	2.429	1145	1026	1.116	Final round
2	Poland (Note: Qualified as host)	12	10	2	29	31	10	3.100	973	856	1.137	Final round
3	Italy	12	9	3	27	29	14	2.071	1006	884	1.138	Final round
4	Japan	12	9	3	25	30	17	1.765	1039	1019	1.020	Final round
5	Canada	12	8	4	23	29	19	1.526	1089	1071	1.017	Final round
6	France	12	8	4	23	30	20	1.500	1122	1070	1.049	Final round
7	Brazil	12	6	6	21	27	24	1.125	1154	1106	1.043	Final round
8	Argentina	12	6	6	18	23	24	0.958	1049	1049	1.000	Final round
9	Cuba	12	5	7	17	24	26	0.923	1109	1132	0.980	
10	Serbia	12	5	7	17	23	26	0.885	1051	1094	0.961	
11	Germany	12	5	7	15	20	25	0.800	1018	1048	0.971	
12	United States	12	5	7	15	19	26	0.731	1015	1047	0.969	
13	Netherlands	12	3	9	11	17	31	0.548	1057	1107	0.955	
14	Bulgaria	12	3	9	8	12	31	0.387	900	1033	0.871	
15	Iran	12	2	10	6	14	34	0.412	1026	1111	0.923	
16	Turkey	12	1	11	5	13	34	0.382	1024	1124	0.911	

Source: VNL 2024 – Men's standings

==== Final round 2024 ====
The VNL Finals will see the seven strongest teams along with the finals host country Poland moving directly to the knockout phase which will consist of eight matches in total: four quarterfinals, two semi-finals and the bronze and gold medal matches.

Pos	Team	Pld	W	L	Pts	SW	SL	SR	SPW	SPL	SPR	Result
1	France	3	3	0	7	9	5	1.800	309	308	1.003	Champions
2	Japan	3	2	1	6	7	3	2.333	254	234	1.085	Runners up
3	Poland (H)	3	2	1	7	8	4	2.000	280	253	1.107	Third place
4	Slovenia	3	1	2	2	3	8	0.375	237	260	0.912	Fourth place
5	Italy	1	0	1	1	2	3	0.667	103	106	0.972	Eliminated in quarterfinals
6	Canada	1	0	1	0	0	3	0.000	66	77	0.857	Eliminated in quarterfinals
7	Brazil	1	0	1	0	1	3	0.333	86	93	0.925	Eliminated in quarterfinals
8	Argentina	1	0	1	1	2	3	0.667	101	105	0.962	Eliminated in quarterfinals

Source: VNL 2024 finals
(H) Host

==== Final eighth ====
Quarter-finals
28 June
Slovenia	3
Argentina	2
27 June
Japan	3
Canada	0
27 June
Poland	3
Brazil	1
28 June
Italy	2
France	3

Semi-finals
29 June
Slovenia	0
Japan	3
29 June
Poland	2
France	3

Final
30 June
Japan	1
France	3
Third place match
30 June
Slovenia	0
Poland	3

=== 2025 FIVB Volleyball Nations League statistics ===
==== Squads ====
Source:

==== Preliminary round ====
The format of play is generally the same as in the 2022 edition. However, the current format has the 18 men's teams competing in pools of 6 teams during the pool phase. Each team play 12 matches during the pool stage. Eight teams will then move into the final knockout phase of the competition.

Pos	Team	Pld	W	L	Pts	SW	SL	SR	SPW	SPL	SPR	Qualification or relegation
1	Brazil	12	11	1	32	35	11	3.182	1095	998	1.097	Final round
2	Italy	12	10	2	28	33	14	2.357	1100	962	1.143	Final round
3	France	12	8	4	24	30	18	1.667	1124	1050	1.070	Final round
4	Japan	12	8	4	23	27	17	1.588	1036	977	1.060	Final round
5	Poland	12	8	4	23	30	20	1.500	1157	1129	1.025	Final round
6	Slovenia	12	7	5	19	22	22	1.000	1002	985	1.017	Final round
7	Cuba	12	6	6	20	28	26	1.077	1196	1174	1.019	Final round
8	Iran	12	6	6	19	25	24	1.042	1088	1061	1.025	
9	Ukraine	12	6	6	18	25	25	1.000	1087	1093	0.995	
10	Bulgaria	12	6	6	17	22	23	0.957	993	1033	0.961	
11	United States	12	6	6	17	21	24	0.875	1006	1033	0.974	
12	Argentina	12	6	6	16	24	26	0.923	1114	1118	0.996	
13	Canada	12	5	7	17	23	24	0.958	1064	1057	1.007	
14	Germany	12	5	7	17	25	27	0.926	1181	1179	1.002	
15	Serbia	12	3	9	10	15	29	0.517	926	1038	0.892	
16	Turkey	12	3	9	10	14	28	0.500	945	992	0.953	
17	China (Note: Qualified as finals' host)	12	3	9	9	12	30	0.400	881	990	0.890	Final round
18	Netherlands	12	1	11	5	11	34	0.324	942	1068	0.882	Excluded from the Nations League

Source: VNL 2025 – Men's standings

==== Final round 2025 ====
The VNL Finals will see the seven strongest teams along with the finals host country China moving directly to the knockout phase which will consist of eight matches in total: four quarterfinals, two semi-finals and the bronze and gold medal matches.

Pos	Team	Pld	W	L	Pts	SW	SL	SR	SPW	SPL	SPR	Result
1	Poland	3	3	0	9	9	0	MAX	229	180	1.272	Champions
2	Italy	3	2	1	6	6	5	1.200	247	244	1.012	Runners up
3	Brazil	3	2	1	6	6	5	1.200	268	252	1.063	Third place
4	Slovenia	3	1	2	3	5	7	0.714	263	279	0.943	Fourth place
5	France	1	0	1	0	1	3	0.333	84	90	0.933	Eliminated in quarterfinals
6	Japan	1	0	1	0	0	3	0.000	59	76	0.776	Eliminated in quarterfinals
7	Cuba	1	0	1	0	1	3	0.333	83	95	0.874	Eliminated in quarterfinals
8	China (H)	1	0	1	0	1	3	0.333	87	104	0.837	Eliminated in quarterfinals

Source: VNL 2025 finals
(H) Host

==== Final eighth ====
Quarter-finals
30 July
Brazil	3
China	1
31 July
Japan	0
Poland	3
30 July
Italy	3
Cuba	1
31 July
France	1
Slovenia	3

Semi-finals
2 August
Brazil	0
Poland	3
2 August
Italy	3
Slovenia	1

Final
3 August
Poland	3
Italy	0
Third place match
3 August
Brazil	3
Slovenia	1

=== 2026 FIVB Volleyball Nations League statistics ===
==== Squads ====
Source:

==== Preliminary round ====
The format of play is generally the same as in the 2022 edition. However, the current format has the 18 men's teams competing in pools of 6 teams during the pool phase. Each team play 12 matches during the pool stage. Eight teams will then move into the final knockout phase of the competition.

Pos	Team	Pld	W	L	Pts	SW	SL	SR	SPW	SPL	SPR	Qualification or relegation
1	Japan	12	12	0	30	36	15	2.400	1183	1074	1.101	Final round
2	Poland	12	10	2	29	34	15	2.267	1164	1051	1.108	Final round
3	Slovenia	12	10	2	26	32	17	1.882	1126	1067	1.055	Final round
4	Italy	12	8	4	26	30	18	1.667	1093	1040	1.051	Final round
5	United States	12	8	4	25	29	16	1.813	1049	960	1.093	Final round
6	Turkey	12	8	4	22	28	19	1.474	1054	1020	1.033	Final round
7	Ukraine	12	7	5	23	27	20	1.350	1082	1048	1.032	Final round
8	Bulgaria	12	7	5	20	24	23	1.043	1063	1039	1.023	
9	Brazil	12	7	5	19	23	21	1.095	1017	985	1.032	
10	France	12	6	6	16	23	24	0.958	1092	1087	1.005	
11	Serbia	12	5	7	16	19	25	0.760	961	1037	0.927	
12	Germany	12	5	7	15	23	28	0.821	1133	1162	0.975	
13	Belgium	12	4	8	12	17	28	0.607	990	1061	0.933	
14	Iran	12	3	9	11	18	30	0.600	1061	1123	0.945	
15	Argentina	12	3	9	10	18	31	0.581	1081	1133	0.954	
16	Cuba	12	3	9	10	16	29	0.552	963	1035	0.930	
17	Canada	12	1	11	10	19	34	0.559	1157	1209	0.957	Excluded from the Nations League
18	China (Note: Qualified as finals' host)	12	1	11	4	10	33	0.303	891	1029	0.866	Final round

Source: VNL 2026 – Men's standings

==== Final round 2026 ====
The VNL Finals will see the seven strongest teams along with the finals host country China moving directly to the knockout phase which will consist of eight matches in total: four quarterfinals, two semi-finals and the bronze and gold medal matches.

Pos	Team	Pld	W	L	Pts	SW	SL	SR	SPW	SPL	SPR	Result
1st place, gold medalist(s)	Poland	15	13	2	37	43	18	2.389	1449	1293	1.121	Champions
2nd place, silver medalist(s)	United States	15	10	5	31	37	21	1.762	1338	1238	1.081	Runners up
3rd place, bronze medalist(s)	Slovenia	15	12	3	32	38	21	1.810	1378	1326	1.039	Third place
4	Japan	15	13	2	34	42	22	1.909	1475	1370	1.077	Fourth place
5	Italy	13	8	5	26	30	21	1.429	1157	1115	1.038	Eliminated in quarterfinals
6	Turkey	13	8	5	22	28	22	1.273	1145	1119	1.023	Eliminated in quarterfinals
7	Ukraine	13	7	6	23	28	23	1.217	1166	1145	1.018	Eliminated in quarterfinals
8	China (H)	13	1	12	4	11	36	0.306	978	1127	0.868	Eliminated in quarterfinals

Source: VNL 2026
(H) Host

==== Final eighth ====
Quarter-finals
29 July
Japan	3
China	1
30 July
Italy	0
United States	3
29 July
Slovenia	3
Turkey	0
30 July
Poland	3
Ukraine	1

Semi-finals
1 August
Japan	2
United States	3
1 August
Slovenia	0
Poland	3

Final
2 August
United States	2
Poland	3
Third place match
2 August
Japan	1
Slovenia	3

== Tournament statistics ==
Edition	Played	Attendance	Preliminary round Sets	Final round Sets	Total Sets	Preliminary round Points	Final round Points	Total Points	Final Match	Attendance in Final
2018	130	494,775 (3,806 per match)	446	35	481 (3.7 per match)	20,134	1,568	21,702 (167 per match)	France 0–3 Russia	10,164
2019	130	449,809 (3,460 per match)	460	40	500 (3.85 per match)	20,770	1,762	22,532 (173 per match)	United States 1–3 Russia	4,375
2021	124	0 (0 per match)	449	13	462 (3.73 per match)	20,031	580	20,611 (166 per match)	Brazil 3–1 Poland	0
2022	104	295,262 (2,839 per match)	351	30	381 (3.66 per match)	15,622	1,293	16,915 (163 per match)	France 3–2 United States	8,490
2023	104	318,294 (3,061 per match)	366	30	396 (3.81 per match)	16,528	1,305	17,833 (172 per match)	Poland 3–1 United States	10,621
2024	104	356,729 (3,430 per match)	375	32	407 (3.91 per match)	16,777	1,436	18,213 (175 per match)	Japan 1–3 France	9,966
2025	116	413,916 (3,568 per match)	422	29	451 (3.89 per match)	18,937	1,320	20,257 (175 per match)	Poland 3–0 Italy	7,000
2026	116	399,875 (3,447 per match)	426	31	457 (3.94 per match)	19,160	1,444	20,604 (178 per match)	United States 2–3 Poland	5,865
Total	928	2,728,660 (2,940 per match)	3,295	240	3,535 (3.81 per match)	147,959	10,708	158,667 (171 per match)	24 medals (8 editions completed)	56,481 (7,060 per final)

Table is current through the end of 2026 Nations League.

== Medals summary ==
Rank	Nation	Gold	Silver	Bronze	Total
1	Poland	3	1	3	7
2	France	2	1	1	4
3	Russia	2	0	0	2
4	Brazil	1	0	1	2
5	United States	0	4	1	5
6	Japan	0	1	1	2
7	Italy	0	1	0	1
8	Slovenia	0	0	1	1
Totals (8 entries)		8	8	8	24

=== Volleyball Nations League (2018–present) ===
Years	VNL Hosts	Gold	Silver	Bronze
2018	(France) Lille	Russia	France	United States
2019	(United States) Chicago	Russia	United States	Poland
2021	(Italy) Rimini	Brazil	Poland	France
2022	(Italy) Bologna	France	United States	Poland
2023	(Poland) Gdańsk	Poland	United States	Japan
2024	(Poland) Łódź	France	Japan	Poland
2025	(China) Ningbo	Poland	Italy	Brazil
2026	(China) Ningbo	Poland	United States	Slovenia

== Team participations ==
=== Appearance ===
Team	Preliminary Round			Final Round		
Team	App.	First	Last	App.	First	Last
Argentina	8	2018	2026	2	2023	2024
Australia	4	2018	2022	–	–	–
Belgium	1	2026	2026	–	–	–
Brazil	8	2018	2026	7	2018	2025
Bulgaria	8	2018	2026	–	–	–
Canada	8	2018	2026	1	2024	2024
China	6	2018	2026	2	2025	2026
Cuba	4	2023	2026	1	2025	2025
France	8	2018	2026	7	2018	2025
Germany	8	2018	2026	–	–	–
Iran	8	2018	2026	2	2019	2022
Italy	8	2018	2026	5	2022	2026
Japan	8	2018	2026	5	2022	2026
Netherlands	5	2021	2025	1	2022	2022
Poland	8	2018	2026	8	2018	2026
Portugal	1	2019	2019	–	–	–
Russia	3	2018	2021	2	2018	2019
Serbia	8	2018	2026	1	2018	2018
Slovenia	6	2021	2026	5	2021	2026
South Korea	1	2018	2018	–	–	–
Turkey	3	2024	2026	1	2026	2026
Ukraine	2	2025	2026	1	2026	2026
United States	8	2018	2026	5	2018	2026
Table current through the 2026 edition.

=== Rankings ===
==== 2018–2024 ====
Rank	VNL 2018
1st place, gold medalist(s)	Russia
2nd place, silver medalist(s)	France
3rd place, bronze medalist(s)	United States
4	Brazil
5	Poland
5	Serbia
7	Canada
8	Italy
9	Germany
10	Iran
11	Bulgaria
12	Japan
13	Australia
14	Argentina
15	China
16	South Korea

Rank	VNL 2019
1st place, gold medalist(s)	Russia
2nd place, silver medalist(s)	United States
3rd place, bronze medalist(s)	Poland
4	Brazil
5	Iran
6	France
7	Argentina
8	Italy
9	Canada
10	Japan
11	Serbia
12	Bulgaria
13	Australia
14	Germany
15	Portugal
16	China

Rank	VNL 2021
1st place, gold medalist(s)	Brazil
2nd place, silver medalist(s)	Poland
3rd place, bronze medalist(s)	France
4	Slovenia
5	Russia
6	Serbia
7	United States
8	Canada
9	Argentina
10	Italy
11	Japan
12	Iran
13	Germany
14	Netherlands
15	Bulgaria
16	Australia

Rank	VNL 2022
1st place, gold medalist(s)	France
2nd place, silver medalist(s)	United States
3rd place, bronze medalist(s)	Poland
4	Italy
5	Japan
6	Brazil
7	Iran
8	Netherlands
9	Argentina
10	Slovenia
11	Serbia
12	Germany
13	China
14	Bulgaria
15	Canada
16	Australia

Rank	VNL 2023
1st place, gold medalist(s)	Poland
2nd place, silver medalist(s)	United States
3rd place, bronze medalist(s)	Japan
4	Italy
5	Argentina
6	Brazil
7	Slovenia
8	France
9	Serbia
10	Netherlands
11	Germany
12	Canada
13	Cuba
14	Iran
15	Bulgaria
16	China

Rank	VNL 2024
1st place, gold medalist(s)	France
2nd place, silver medalist(s)	Japan
3rd place, bronze medalist(s)	Poland
4	Slovenia
5	Italy
6	Canada
7	Brazil
8	Argentina
9	Cuba
10	Serbia
11	Germany
12	United States
13	Netherlands
14	Bulgaria
15	Iran
16	Turkey

==== 2025–present ====
Rank	VNL 2025
1st place, gold medalist(s)	Poland
2nd place, silver medalist(s)	Italy
3rd place, bronze medalist(s)	Brazil
4	Slovenia
5	France
6	Japan
7	Cuba
8	China
9	Iran
10	Ukraine
11	Bulgaria
12	United States
13	Argentina
14	Canada
15	Germany
16	Serbia
17	Turkey
18	Netherlands

Rank	VNL 2026
1st place, gold medalist(s)	Poland
2nd place, silver medalist(s)	United States
3rd place, bronze medalist(s)	Slovenia
4	Japan
5	Italy
6	Turkey
7	Ukraine
8	China
9	Bulgaria
10	Brazil
11	France
12	Serbia
13	Germany
14	Belgium
15	Iran
16	Argentina
17	Cuba
18	Canada

=== Team performances by season ===
Legend

- 1st – Champions
- 2nd – Runners-up
- 3rd – Third place
- 4th – Fourth place
- – No movement for challenger teams
- ▲ – Promoted to the next year's VNL
- ▼ – Relegated for challenger teams (2018–2024) / Relegated from VNL (2025–present)

Team	2018 (16)			2019 (16)			2021 (16)			2022 (16)			2023 (16)			2024 (16)			2025 (18)		2026 (18)	
Team	G	FR	RK	G	FR	RK	G	FR	RK	G	FR	RK	G	FR	RK	G	FR	RK	FR	RK	FR	RK
Argentina	C	P	14	C	P	7	C	P	9	C	P	9	C	F	5	C	F	8	P	13	P	16
Australia	CH	P	13	CH	P	13	CH	P	16	CH ▼	P	16	did not participate									
Belgium	did not participate															VCC			did not participate		P	14
Brazil	C	F	4	C	F	4	C	F	1	C	F	6	C	F	6	C	F	7	F	3	P	10
Bulgaria	CH	P	11	CH	P	12	CH	P	15	CH	P	14	CH	P	15	CH	P	14	P	11	P	9
Canada	CH	P	7	CH	P	9	CH	P	8	CH	P	15	CH	P	12	CH	F	6	P	14	P	18 ▼
China	C	P	15	C	P	16	Withdrew (Note: Netherlands replaced China after the decision of the Chinese Volleyball Association to withdraw its national men's team due to financial limitations and travel restrictions caused by the COVID-19 pandemic.)			CH	P	13	CH ▼	P	16	VCC ▲			F	8	F	8
Cuba	VCC			VCC			VCC (canceled)			VCC ▲			CH	P	13	CH	P	9	F	7	P	17
France	C	F	2	C	F	6	C	F	3	C	F	1	C	F	8	C	F	1	F	5	P	11
Germany	C	P	9	C	P	14	C	P	13	C	P	12	C	P	11	C	P	11	P	15	P	13
Iran	C	P	10	C	F	5	C	P	12	C	F	7	C	P	14	C	P	15	P	9	P	15
Italy	C	P	8	C	P	8	C	P	10	C	F	4	C	F	4	C	F	5	F	2	F	5
Japan	C	P	12	C	P	10	C	P	11	C	F	5	C	F	3	C	F	2	F	6	F	4
Netherlands	did not participate						CH	P	14	CH	F	8	CH	P	10	CH	P	13	P	18 ▼	did not participate	
Poland	C	F	5	C	F	3	C	F	2	C	F	3	C	F	1	C	F	3	F	1	F	1
Portugal	VCC ▲			CH ▼	P	15	VCC (canceled)			did not participate												
Russia	C	F	1	C	F	1	C	P	5	Excluded (Note: Russian athletes were banned from competing following the 2022 Russian invasion of Ukraine.)												
Serbia	C	F	5	C	P	11	C	P	6	C	P	11	C	P	9	C	P	10	P	16	P	12
Slovenia	did not participate			VCC ▲			CH	F	4	CH	P	10	CH	F	7	CH	F	4	F	4	F	3
South Korea	CH ▼	P	16	VCC (withdrew)			VCC (canceled)			VCC			did not participate									
Turkey	did not participate			VCC			VCC (canceled)			VCC			VCC ▲			CH	P	16	P	17	F	6
Ukraine	did not participate												VCC			VCC			P	10	F	7
United States	C	F	3	C	F	2	C	P	7	C	F	2	C	F	2	C	P	12	P	12	F	2
Table current through the 2026 edition.

=== Debut of national teams ===
Year	Debutants	Total
2018	Argentina, Australia, Brazil, Bulgaria, Canada, China, France, Germany, Iran, Italy, Japan, Poland, Russia, Serbia, South Korea, United States	16
2019	Portugal	1
2021	Netherlands, Slovenia	2
2022	None	0
2023	Cuba	1
2024	Turkey	1
2025	Ukraine	1
2026	Belgium	1
2027	Finland	1

=== By top four finishes ===
Rank	Nation	Number of appearances	Years in semifinals
1	Poland	7	(2019, 2021, 2022, 2023, 2024, 2025, 2026)
2	United States	5	(2018, 2019, 2022, 2023, 2026)
3	Brazil	4	(2018, 2019, 2021, 2025)
3	France	4	(2018, 2021, 2022, 2024)
3	Slovenia	4	(2021, 2024, 2025, 2026)
6	Japan	3	(2023, 2024, 2026)
6	Italy	3	(2022, 2023, 2025)
8	Russia	2	(2018, 2019)

== Statistics leaders ==
=== Preliminary round ===
Best Scorers (Note: (Best scorers determined by scored points from spike, block and serve).)
	Player	Spikes	Blocks	Serves	Total
2018	(China) Jiang Chuan	242	19	13	274
2019	(Japan) Yūji Nishida	184	13	23	220
2021	(Netherlands) Nimir Abdel-Aziz	218	10	36	264
2022	(Netherlands) Nimir Abdel-Aziz	191	10	30	231
2023	(Netherlands) Nimir Abdel-Aziz	184	8	25	217
2024	(Slovenia) Tonček Štern	265	24	31	320
2025	(Cuba) Marlon Yant	200	22	15	237
2026	(Bulgaria) Aleksandar Nikolov	247	11	20	278

Best Attackers (Note: (Best attackers determined by successful spikes).)
	Player	Spikes	Faults	Shots	Total
2018	(Russia) Dmitry Muserskiy	146	15	62	223
2019	(Argentina) Bruno Lima	177	50	98	325
2021	(Netherlands) Nimir Abdel-Aziz	218	77	113	408
2022	(Netherlands) Nimir Abdel-Aziz	191	53	125	369
2023	(Netherlands) Nimir Abdel-Aziz	184	66	105	355
2024	(Slovenia) Tonček Štern	265	68	153	486
2025	(Cuba) Marlon Yant	200	69	144	413
2026	(Bulgaria) Aleksandar Nikolov	247	77	134	458

Best Blockers (Note: (Best blockers determined by the stuff blocks, faults and rebounds).)
	Player	Blocks	Faults	Rebounds	Total
2018	(Bulgaria) Svetoslav Gotsev	34	69	80	183
2019	(Canada) Graham Vigrass	31	63	65	159
2021	(Serbia) Marko Podraščanin	44	66	51	161
2022	(Bulgaria) Svetoslav Gotsev	35	38	19	92
2023	(Argentina) Agustín Loser	51	61	44	156
2024	(Argentina) Agustín Loser	34	59	47	140
2025	(Ukraine) Yurii Semeniuk	37	55	47	139
2026	(Canada) Jackson Howe	45	70	75	190

Best Servers (Note: (Best servers determined by aces, faults and hits).)
	Player	Aces	Faults	Hits	Total
2018	(France) Earvin N'Gapeth	17	34	74	125
2019	(Russia) Egor Kliuka	28	37	107	172
2021	(Netherlands) Nimir Abdel-Aziz	36	55	94	185
2022	(Netherlands) Nimir Abdel-Aziz	30	55	79	164
2023	(Netherlands) Nimir Abdel-Aziz	25	52	101	179
2024	(Netherlands) Nimir Abdel-Aziz	40	56	94	190
2025	(Turkey) Ramazan Efe Mandıracı	26	28	110	164
2026	(Ukraine) Dmytro Yanchuk	21	35	101	157
2026	(Japan) Ran Takahashi	21	27	145	193

Best Setters (Note: (Best setters determined by running setts, faults and still sets).)
	Player	Running	Faults	Still	Total
2018	(Argentina) Maximiliano Cavanna	995	5	285	1285
2019	(Iran) Saeid Marouf	529	17	688	1234
2021	(Slovenia) Gregor Ropret	375	6	709	1090
2022	(Bulgaria) Georgi Seganov	301	8	587	896
2023	(Brazil) Bruno Rezende	230	6	595	831
2024	(Slovenia) Gregor Ropret	359	9	831	1199
2025	(Brazil) Fernando Kreling	392	2	478	872
2026	(France) Antoine Brizard	396	5	575	976

Best Diggers (Note: (Best diggers determined by successful digs, faults and receptions).)
	Player	Digs	Faults	Receptions	Total
2018	(Australia) Luke Perry	73	0	136	209
2019	(Argentina) Santiago Danani	143	57	45	245
2021	(Italy) Fabio Balaso	161	48	25	234
2022	(Argentina) Santiago Danani	117	52	24	193
2023	(Slovenia) Jani Kovačič	119	31	15	165
2024	(Argentina) Santiago Danani	123	58	7	188
2025	(Brazil) Maique Nascimento	101	56	61	218
2026	(Argentina) Franco Massimino	112	43	48	203

Best Receivers (Note: (Best receivers determined by efficient receptions, faults and serve receptions).)
	Player	Excellents	Faults	Serve	Total
2018	(Poland) Paweł Zatorski	59	9	137	205
2019	(Brazil) Thales Hoss	104	23	231	358
2021	(Serbia) Marko Ivović	123	23	161	307
2022	(Argentina) Santiago Danani	87	10	116	213
2023	(Japan) Yūki Ishikawa	61	10	131	202
2024	(Iran) Arman Salehi	90	16	164	270
2025	(Netherlands) Tom Koops	106	17	211	334
2026	(France) Mathis Henno	93	11	229	333

=== Final Round ===
Best Scorers
	Player	Spikes	Blocks	Serves	Total
2018	(France) Stéphen Boyer	64	8	3	75
2019	(Poland) Bartosz Bednorz	65	8	6	79
2021	(Brazil) Yoandy Leal	34	1	2	37
2022	(France) Jean Patry	47	2	3	52
2023	(Japan) Yūki Ishikawa	60	5	5	70
2024	(Japan) Yūki Ishikawa	56	5	3	64
2025	(Italy) Alessandro Michieletto	37	6	7	50
2026	(United States) Jake Hanes	51	3	12	66

Best Attackers
	Player	Spikes	Faults	Shots	Total
2018	(Poland) Bartosz Kurek	21	5	7	33
2019	(United States) Taylor Sander	46	10	24	80
2021	(Brazil) Yoandy Leal	34	5	23	62
2022	(France) Jean Patry	47	7	23	77
2023	(Japan) Yūki Ishikawa	60	12	41	113
2024	(Japan) Yūki Ishikawa	56	19	30	105
2025	(Brazil) Alan Souza	40	13	26	79
2026	(Slovenia) Rok Možič	53	16	30	99

Best Blockers
	Player	Blocks	Faults	Rebounds	Total
2018	(Brazil) Lucas Saatkamp	11	16	27	54
2019	(United States) Maxwell Holt	17	19	17	53
2021	(Brazil) Maurício Souza	9	9	10	28
2022	(United States) David Smith	8	16	19	43
2023	(Italy) Roberto Russo	9	10	16	35
2024	(France) Nicolas Le Goff	13	22	11	46
2025	(Slovenia) Jan Kozamernik	8	9	15	32
2026	(Poland) Bartłomiej Lemański	10	8	11	29

Best Servers
	Player	Aces	Faults	Hits	Total
2018	(Russia) Egor Kliuka	6	6	38	50
2019	(Russia) Egor Kliuka	8	9	31	48
2021	(France) Earvin N'Gapeth	4	8	17	29
2022	(United States) Torey DeFalco	7	9	38	54
2023	(Poland) Mateusz Bieniek	8	6	33	47
2024	(Japan) Tatsunori Otsuka	4	3	35	42
2025	(Italy) Alessandro Michieletto	7	8	30	45
2026	(United States) Jake Hanes	12	17	29	58

Best Setters
	Player	Running	Faults	Still	Total
2018	(Brazil) Bruno Rezende	252	3	4	259
2019	(Iran) Saeid Marouf	71	3	129	203
2021	(Brazil) Bruno Rezende	40	1	111	152
2022	(United States) Micah Christenson	72	1	178	251
2023	(United States) Micah Christenson	100	0	156	256
2024	(Poland) Marcin Janusz	67	0	133	200
2025	(Brazil) Fernando Kreling	115	1	133	249
2026	(United States) Micah Christenson	102	0	163	265

Best Diggers
	Player	Digs	Faults	Receptions	Total
2018	(Poland) Paweł Zatorski	14	0	16	30
2019	(Iran) Saeid Marouf	24	5	8	37
2021	(Slovenia) Jani Kovačič	18	4	2	24
2022	(Italy) Fabio Balaso	35	6	3	44
2023	(Japan) Tomohiro Yamamoto	35	13	1	49
2024	(Japan) Tomohiro Yamamoto	28	17	0	45
2025	(Brazil) Alan Souza	20	4	3	27
2026	(Slovenia) Grega Okroglič	28	14	11	53
2026	(Poland) Jakub Popiwczak	28	10	8	46

Best Receivers
	Player	Excellents	Faults	Serve	Total
2018	(Brazil) Thales Hoss	24	4	47	75
2019	(Brazil) Thales Hoss	27	6	73	106
2021	(Slovenia) Klemen Čebulj	17	2	22	41
2022	(France) Trevor Clevenot	32	1	33	66
2023	(Japan) Ran Takahashi	16	5	42	63
2024	(Slovenia) Klemen Čebulj	20	10	41	71
2025	(Italy) Fabio Balaso	22	2	47	71
2026	(United States) Matt Anderson	16	3	64	83

== Individual awards ==
=== VNL Dream Team ===
Year	MVP	Middle Blockers		Setter	Outside Spikers			Opposite Spiker	Libero
(France) 2018	(Russia) Maxim Mikhaylov	(Russia) Dmitry Muserskiy	(France) Kévin Le Roux	(France) Benjamin Toniutti	(United States) Taylor Sander	(Russia) Dmitry Volkov	—N/a	(United States) Matt Anderson	(France) Jenia Grebennikov
(United States) 2019	(United States) Matt Anderson	(Russia) Ivan Iakovlev	(United States) Maxwell Holt	(United States) Micah Christenson	(Poland) Bartosz Bednorz	(Russia) Dmitry Volkov (2)	(Russia) Egor Kliuka	(United States) Matt Anderson (2)	(United States) Erik Shoji
(Italy) 2021	(Brazil) Wallace de Souza / (Poland) Bartosz Kurek	(Brazil) Maurício Souza	(Poland) Mateusz Bieniek	(Poland) Fabian Drzyzga	(Brazil) Yoandy Leal	(Poland) Michał Kubiak	—N/a	(Brazil) Wallace de Souza / (Poland) Bartosz Kurek	(Brazil) Thales Hoss
(Italy) 2022	(France) Earvin N'Gapeth	(United States) David Smith	(Poland) Mateusz Bieniek (2)	(United States) Micah Christenson (2)	(France) Trévor Clévenot	(France) Earvin N'Gapeth	—N/a	(France) Jean Patry	(France) Jenia Grebennikov (2)
(Poland) 2023	(Poland) Paweł Zatorski	(Poland) Jakub Kochanowski	(United States) David Smith (2)	(United States) Micah Christenson (3)	(Poland) Aleksander Śliwka	(Japan) Yūki Ishikawa	—N/a	(Poland) Łukasz Kaczmarek	(Poland) Paweł Zatorski
(Poland) 2024	(France) Antoine Brizard	(Poland) Jakub Kochanowski (2)	(France) Nicolas Le Goff	(France) Antoine Brizard	(Poland) Tomasz Fornal	(Japan) Yūki Ishikawa (2)	—N/a	(France) Jean Patry (2)	(Japan) Tomohiro Yamamoto
(China) 2025	(Poland) Jakub Kochanowski	(Poland) Jakub Kochanowski (3)	(Slovenia) Jan Kozamernik	(Italy) Simone Giannelli	(Poland) Wilfredo León	(Italy) Alessandro Michieletto	—N/a	(Poland) Kewin Sasak	(Brazil) Maique Nascimento
(China) 2026	(Poland) Tomasz Fornal	(Canada) Jackson Howe	—N/a	(France) Antoine Brizard	(Bulgaria) Aleksandar Nikolov	(Ukraine) Dmytro Yanchuk	(France) Mathis Henno	—N/a	(Argentina) Franco Massimino

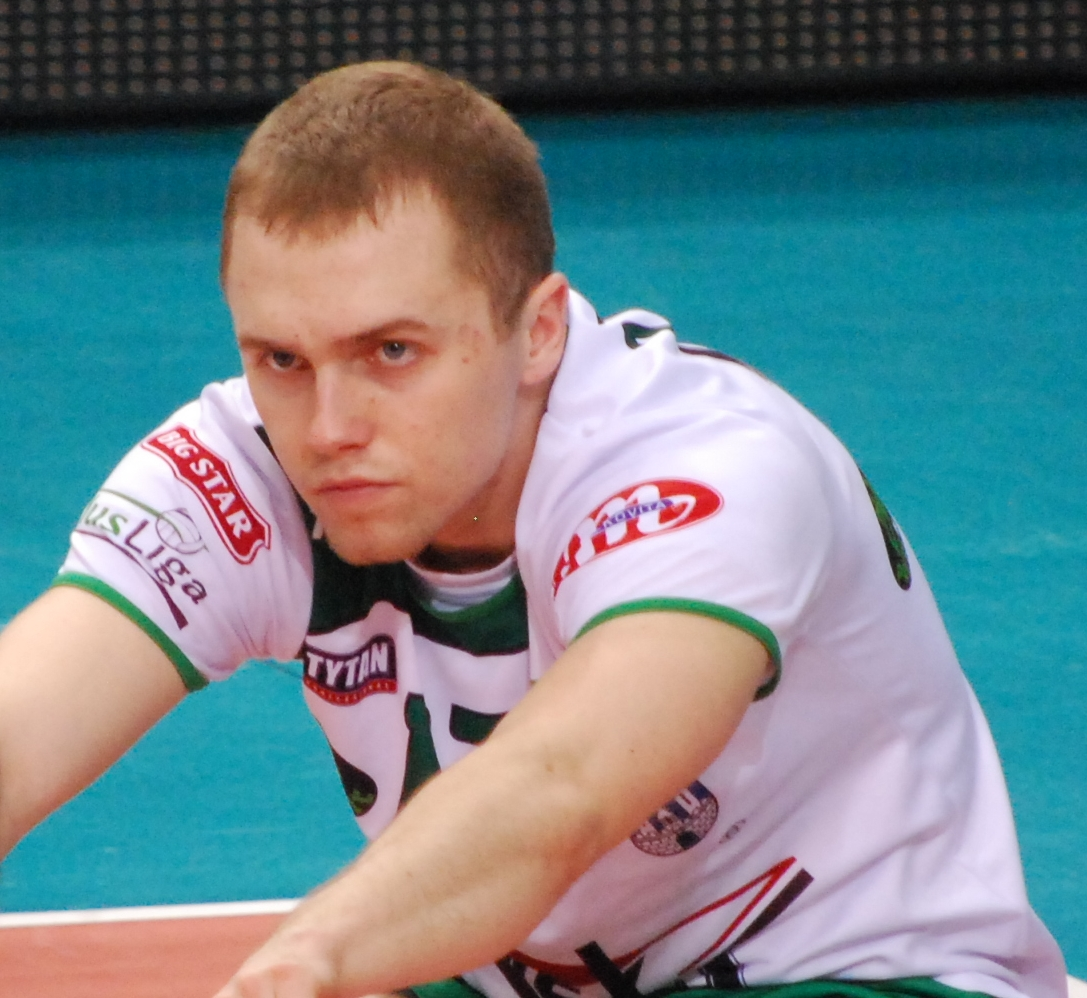
Paweł Zatorski was the 2023 FIVB Nations League Most Valuable Player.

== Team awards ==
=== Fair play award ===
Year	Team
(France) 2018	Not awarded
(United States) 2019	Not awarded
(Italy) 2021	Not awarded
(Italy) 2022	Poland
(Poland) 2023	United States
(Poland) 2024	Slovenia
(China) 2025	Not awarded
(China) 2026	Not awarded

== All-time team records ==
Rank	Teams^{‡}	Played	Wins	Losses	Points	Set wins	Set lost	Set ratio	Points wins	Points lost	Points ratio	Final round	VNL Best results
1	Poland	128	98	30	282	323	158	2.044	11288	10328	1.093	8	(gold) (2023, 2025, 2026)
2	Brazil	121	83	38	248	284	171	1.661	10638	9903	1.074	7	(gold) (2021)
3	France	121	81	40	238	288	179	1.609	10862	10167	1.068	7	(gold) (2022, 2024)
4	United States	122	78	44	233	272	182	1.495	10515	9922	1.060	5	(silver) (2019, 2022, 2023, 2026)
5	Italy	116	73	43	220	257	180	1.428	10024	9443	1.062	5	(silver) (2025)
6	Japan	116	73	43	200	248	204	1.216	10233	10010	1.022	5	(silver) (2024)
7	Slovenia (▲2)	87	57	30	158	187	140	1.336	7507	7284	1.031	5	(bronze) (2026)
8	Serbia (▼1)	107	51	56	147	195	223	0.874	9209	9434	0.976	1	5th (2018)
9	Argentina (▼1)	107	48	59	150	202	220	0.918	9504	9541	0.996	2	5th (2023)
10	Iran	108	44	64	144	192	224	0.857	9334	9467	0.986	2	5th (2019)
11	Canada	106	42	64	134	181	223	0.812	8976	9228	0.973	1	6th (2024)
12	Russia (Note: Russian athletes were banned from competing following the 2022 Russian invasion of Ukraine.)	53	41	12	123	133	58	2.293	4504	4122	1.109	2	(gold) (2018, 2019)
13	Germany	105	36	69	116	176	246	0.715	9167	9665	0.948		9th (2018)
14	Bulgaria	105	33	72	99	145	253	0.573	8496	9198	0.924		11th (2018, 2025)
15	Netherlands	64	18	46	61	90	153	0.588	5238	5611	0.934	1	8th (2022)
16	Cuba	49	17	32	55	84	117	0.718	4374	4555	0.960	1	7th (2025)
17	Ukraine (▲2)	25	13	12	41	53	48	1.104	2253	2238	1.007	1	7th (2026)
18	China (▼1)	80	13	67	41	74	211	0.351	5947	6771	0.878	2	8th (2025, 2026)
19	Turkey (▲1)	37	12	25	37	55	84	0.655	3114	3235	0.963	1	6th (2026)
20	Australia (▼2)	57	10	47	32	56	151	0.371	4291	4949	0.867		13th (2018, 2019)
21	Belgium	12	4	8	12	17	28	0.607	990	1061	0.933		14th (2026)
22	Portugal (▼1)	15	2	13	7	12	40	0.300	1095	1268	0.864		15th (2019)
23	South Korea (▼1)	15	1	14	6	11	42	0.262	1108	1267	0.875		16th (2018)
	Finland												debut (2027)
Total	23 teams	928 matches				3,535 sets (3.81 pg)			158,667 points (170.98 pg)			17 teams FR	24 medals

- ^{‡} Change since previous year rankings.
- Table current through the end of the 2026 Nations League.

=== Standing procedure ===
1. Total number of victories (matches won, matches lost)
2. In the event of a tie, the following first tiebreaker will apply: The teams will be ranked by the most points gained per match as follows:
  - Match won 3–0 or 3–1: 3 points for the winner, 0 points for the loser
  - Match won 3–2: 2 points for the winner, 1 point for the loser
  - Match forfeited: 3 points for the winner, 0 points (0–25, 0–25, 0–25) for the loser
3. If teams are still tied after examining the number of victories and points gained, then the FIVB will examine the results in order to break the tie in the following order:
  - Sets quotient: if two or more teams are tied on the number of points gained, they will be ranked by the quotient resulting from the division of the number of all sets won by the number of all sets lost.
  - Points quotient: if the tie persists based on the sets quotient, the teams will be ranked by the quotient resulting from the division of all points scored by the total of points lost during all sets.
  - If the tie persists based on the points quotient, the tie will be broken based on the team that won the match of the Round Robin Phase between the tied teams. When the tie in points quotient is between three or more teams, these teams ranked taking into consideration only the matches involving the teams in question.

== See also ==
- FIVB Women's Volleyball Nations League statistics
- FIVB Women's Volleyball Nations League
- Volleyball records and statistics
- Major achievements in volleyball by nation
- List of indoor volleyball world medalists
