= List of sports events in Tauron Arena Kraków =

== 2014 FIVB Volleyball World League ==
Date	Time		Score		Set 1	Set 2	Set 3	Set 4	Set 5	Total	Report
20 Jun	19:30	Poland	3–1	Brazil	25–20	25–21	28–30	25–20		103–91	P2 P3

== 2014 Memorial of Hubert Jerzy Wagner ==
Date	Time		Score		Set 1	Set 2	Set 3	Set 4	Set 5	Total	Report
16 Sep	17:30	China	0–3	Russia	24–26	21–25	17–25			62–76	
16 Sep	20:30	Poland	2–3	Bulgaria	25–20	23–25	27–29	26–24	13–15	114–113	
17 Sep	17:30	Bulgaria	1–3	Russia	23–25	25–22	20–25	19–25		87–97	
17 Sep	20:30	Poland	3–0	China	25–18	25–22	25–17			75–57	
18 Sep	17:30	China	2–3	Bulgaria	22–25	25–22	25–20	17–25	18–20	107–112	
18 Sep	20:30	Poland	3–2	Russia	22–25	26–24	20–25	26–24	15–9	109–107	

== 2014 FIVB Volleyball Men's World Championship ==
Date	Time		Score		Set 1	Set 2	Set 3	Set 4	Set 5	Total	Report
31 Aug	13:10	Italy	1–3	Iran	16–25	25–23	21–25	22–25		84–98	P2 P3
31 Aug	16:40	Belgium	2–3	United States	21–25	25–17	16–25	25–21	11–15	98–103	P2 P3
31 Aug	20:25	Puerto Rico	0–3	France	23–25	22–25	24–26			69–76	P2 P3
02 Sep	13:10	United States	2–3	Iran	23–25	19–25	25–19	25–18	15–17	107–104	P2 P3
02 Sep	16:40	Belgium	3–0	Puerto Rico	25–19	25–17	25–20			75–56	P2 P3
02 Sep	20:25	France	2–3	Italy	25–20	25–20	23–25	13–25	12–15	98–105	P2 P3
04 Sep	13:10	Puerto Rico	0–3	United States	15–25	8–25	20–25			43–75	P2 P3
04 Sep	16:40	Iran	1–3	France	18–25	25–14	19–25	27–29		89–93	P2 P3
04 Sep	20:25	Italy	3–1	Belgium	26–28	25–15	25–16	28–26		104–85	P2 P3
06 Sep	13:10	United States	1–3	France	25–19	17–25	15–25	21–25		78–94	P2 P3
06 Sep	16:40	Belgium	1–3	Iran	23–25	15–25	25–21	20–25		83–96	P2 P3
06 Sep	20:25	Puerto Rico	3–1	Italy	19–25	25–19	25–23	25–22		94–89	P2 P3
07 Sep	13:10	France	3–2	Belgium	25–14	21–25	25–20	22–25	15–12	108–96	P2 P3
07 Sep	16:40	Iran	3–0	Puerto Rico	25–17	25–22	25–14			75–53	P2 P3
07 Sep	20:25	Italy	1–3	United States	18–25	20–25	25–23	17–25		80–98	P2 P3

== 2014–15 EuroLeague Women ==
18 December 2014
18:30

Boxscore

(Poland) Wisła Can-Pack Kraków	53–64	(Turkey) Galatasaray OdeaBank
Scoring by quarter: 15–16, 6–18, 15–17, 17–13

Attendance: 12,990
