= Jolan Cox =

Belgian volleyball player (born 1991)

Personal information
- Nationality: Belgian
- Born: 12 July 1991 (age 35)
- Height: 194 cm (6 ft 4 in)
- Weight: 75 kg (165 lb)
- Spike: 340 cm (134 in)
- Block: 320 cm (126 in)

Volleyball information
- Number: 2 (national team)

Career
Years	Teams
2015	Greenyard Maaseik

National team
2015	Belgium
Honours
Men's volleyball
Representing Belgium
FIVB Challenger Cup
Silver medal – second place	2024 Linyi

Jolan Cox (born 12 July 1991) is a Belgian male volleyball player. He is part of the Belgium men's national volleyball team. On club level he plays for Prefaxis Menen.
