= Reda Haikal =

Egyptian volleyball player (born 1990)

Personal information
- Nationality: Egyptian
- Born: 7 November 1990 (age 35)
- Height: 198 cm (6 ft 6 in)
- Weight: 85 kg (187 lb)
- Spike: 359 cm (141 in)
- Block: 342 cm (135 in)

Volleyball information
- Number: 17

Career
Years	Teams
2012	Zamalek
Honours
Men's volleyball
Representing Egypt
FIVB Challenger Cup
Bronze medal – third place	2024 Linyi

Reda Haikal (born 7 November 1990) is an Egyptian male volleyball player. He plays the position of opposite spiker. With his club Zamalek he competed at the 2012 FIVB Volleyball Men's Club World Championship. He has previously played for the Talaea El-Geish and Tomis Constanta teams.

Haikal was born in Cairo.
