= Seppe Rotty =

Belgian volleyball player (born 2001)

Personal information
- Born: 12 March 2001 (age 25); Torhout, Belgium
- Height: 1.90 m (6 ft 3 in)
- Weight: 81 kg (179 lb)
- Spike: 345 cm (136 in)
- Block: 325 cm (128 in)
- Education: Ghent University

Volleyball information
- Position: Outside hitter
- Current club: Allianz Milano
- Number: 12

Career
Years	Teams
2019–2022; 2022–2025; 2025–	Volley Menen; Knack Roeselare; Allianz Milano

National team
2021–	Belgium
Honours
Men's volleyball
Representing Belgium
FIVB Challenger Cup
Silver medal – second place	2024 Linyi

Seppe Rotty (born 12 March 2001) is a Belgian professional volleyball player who plays as an outside hitter for Allianz Milano and the Belgium national team.

== Career ==
=== Club ===
As a child, Rotty used to practise tennis and athletics at Houtland Torhout, before accidentally joining the volleyball team of Rembert Torhout.

After graduating from Topsportschool Vilvoorde in 2019, he signed his first professional contract with Volley Menen. As a player of that club, he was named the 2022 Player of the Year.

For the 2022–23 season, he signed a contract with Knack Roeselare, the Belgian champions of that time. In 2024, he was once again named the Player of the Year.

=== National team ===
He made his debut in the senior national team in 2021.

== Personal life ==
Since 2019, he has been studying industrial civil engineering at Ghent University.

== Honours ==
=== Club ===
- CEV Cup
  - 2022–23 – with Knack Roeselare
- CEV Challenge Cup
  - 2025–26 – with Allianz Milano
- Domestic
  - 2022–23 Belgian SuperCup, with Knack Roeselare
  - 2022–23 Belgian Cup, with Knack Roeselare
  - 2022–23 Belgian Championship, with Knack Roeselare
  - 2023–24 Belgian SuperCup, with Knack Roeselare
  - 2023–24 Belgian Cup, with Knack Roeselare
  - 2023–24 Belgian Championship, with Knack Roeselare
  - 2024–25 Belgian Cup, with Knack Roeselare
  - 2024–25 Belgian Championship, with Knack Roeselare
