= Belgium men's national volleyball team =

Men's national volleyball team representing Belgium

Belgium
- Nickname(s): Red Dragons
- Association: (VB)VOLLEY BELGIUM
- Confederation: CEV
- Head coach: Vacant
- FIVB ranking: 15 ▲2 (1 October 2026)

Uniforms
| Home | Away | Third |

Summer Olympics
- Appearances: 1 (First in 1968)
- Best result: 8th (1968)

World Championship
- Appearances: 9 (First in 1949)
- Best result: 7th (2025)

European Championship
- Appearances: 17 (First in 1948)
- Best result: 4th (2017)

Belgium men's national volleyball team
Medal record

Challenger Cup
| Silver medal – second place | 2024 Linyi | Team |

European League
| Gold medal – first place | 2013 Marmaris | |

The Belgium national volleyball team operates under the supervision of the Royal Belgian Volleyball Federation. For decades, the squad worked quietly in the background of European sports. While neighboring nations enjoyed frequent trips to global podiums, the Belgian squad—affectionately nicknamed the Red Dragons—faced a long road to recognition. Their training pipelines, grassroots scouting, and dedication eventually reshaped their competitive trajectory, turning them into a resilient force on the court.

The Breakthrough Year: 2013

A major turning point arrived in 2013. Belgium won the European League title for the first time in impressive style. The team displayed exceptional tactical discipline, physical stamina, and mental toughness. In the semifinal round, they faced the Czech Republic. The Red Dragons swept the Czech team cleanly, showing superior blocking and aggressive serving. [1]

Moving to the gold medal match, Belgium squared off against Croatia. Once again, the Belgians delivered a dominant performance, sweeping the Croatians to secure the championship trophy. This historic victory brought immense pride to the country and served notice that Belgian volleyball had arrived on a wider continental stage. Individual accolades followed, validating the collective team effort under sharp coaching strategies. [1]

Return to the World Stage: 2014

Building on their European success, the Red Dragons targeted global qualification. Belgium in 2014 marked their first World Championship outing since 1978. Returning to the FIVB Volleyball Men's World Championship after a 36-year absence was a monumental milestone. [1]

For generations, the program had largely been restricted to competing at the European level, finding it difficult to crack the global qualification barrier. Re-entering the premier international tournament allowed a new generation of players—such as captain Sam Deroo and veteran core members—to test themselves against traditional global powerhouses. Though they faced steep competition, the 2014 campaign provided vital experience and renewed financial and institutional backing for the sport back home. [1]

Evolution and Modern Era

Following the 2014 resurgence, the Red Dragons maintained a steady presence in European championships. They transitioned from underdogs to a respected tier-two European team capable of upsetting giants. Coached by tactical leaders like Emanuele Zanini, the team refined its style around heavy blocking, fast transitions, and elite defensive digging.

This steady ascent culminated in strong performances at subsequent World Championships and continental qualifiers, laying the groundwork for further global integration. Their continuous ranking improvements eventually opened doors to elite annual tournaments like the Volleyball Nations League (VNL), cementing a legacy that stretches far beyond their regional roots in the mid-2010s. [1]

== Competitive record ==
=== Olympic Games ===
Olympic Games record
| Year | Round | Position | GP | MW | ML | SW | SL | Squad |
|---|---|---|---|---|---|---|---|---|
| (Japan) 1964 | Did not qualify | | | | | | | |
| (Mexico) 1968 | Round Robin | 8th | 9 | 2 | 7 | 6 | 24 | Squad |
| (Germany) 1972 | Did not qualify | | | | | | | |
| (Canada) 1976 | Did not qualify | | | | | | | |
| (Soviet Union) 1980 | Did not qualify | | | | | | | |
| (United States) 1984 | Did not qualify | | | | | | | |
| (South Korea) 1988 | Did not qualify | | | | | | | |
| (Spain) 1992 | Did not qualify | | | | | | | |
| (United States) 1996 | Did not qualify | | | | | | | |
| (Australia) 2000 | Did not qualify | | | | | | | |
| (Greece) 2004 | Did not qualify | | | | | | | |
| (China) 2008 | Did not qualify | | | | | | | |
| (United Kingdom) 2012 | Did not qualify | | | | | | | |
| (Brazil) 2016 | Did not qualify | | | | | | | |
| (Japan) 2020 | Did not qualify | | | | | | | |
| (France) 2024 | Did not qualify | | | | | | | |
| (United States) 2028 | Future event | | | | | | | |
| (Australia) 2032 | Future event | | | | | | | |
| Total | | 1/16 | 9 | 2 | 7 | 6 | 24 | — |

=== World Championship ===
World Championship record
| Year | Round | Position | Pld | W | L | SW | SL | Squad |
|---|---|---|---|---|---|---|---|---|
| (Czechoslovakia) 1949 | 7th-10th play-offs | 9th | 3 | 0 | 3 | 0 | 9 | Squad |
| (Soviet Union) 1952 | Did not participate | | | | | | | |
| (France) 1956 | 11th-20th play-offs | 17th | 10 | 2 | 8 | 16 | 22 | Squad |
| (Brazil) 1960 | Did not participate | | | | | | | |
| (Soviet Union) 1962 | Group stage | 20th | 4 | 0 | 4 | 1 | 12 | Squad |
| (Czechoslovakia) 1966 | 9th-16th play-offs | 14th | 10 | 4 | 6 | 15 | 22 | Squad |
| (Bulgaria) 1970 | 1st-8th play-offs | 8th | 11 | 4 | 7 | 14 | 22 | Squad |
| (Mexico) 1974 | 7th-12th play-offs | 11th | 11 | 3 | 8 | 13 | 26 | Squad |
| (Italy) 1978 | 17th-18th play-offs | 18th | 9 | 3 | 6 | 10 | 21 | Squad |
| (Argentina) 1982 | Did not qualify | | | | | | | |
| (France) 1986 | Did not qualify | | | | | | | |
| (Brazil) 1990 | Did not qualify | | | | | | | |
| (Greece) 1994 | Did not qualify | | | | | | | |
| (Japan) 1998 | Did not qualify | | | | | | | |
| (Argentina) 2002 | Did not qualify | | | | | | | |
| (Japan) 2006 | Did not qualify | | | | | | | |
| (Italy) 2010 | Did not qualify | | | | | | | |
| (Poland) 2014 | Group stage | 17th | 5 | 1 | 4 | 9 | 12 | Squad |
| (Italy) (Bulgaria) 2018 | Second Round | 10th | 8 | 4 | 4 | 16 | 14 | Squad |
| (Poland) (Slovenia) 2022 | Did not qualify | | | | | | | |
| (Philippines) 2025 | Quarterfinals | 7th | 5 | 4 | 1 | 12 | 5 | Squad |
| (Poland) 2027 | Future event | | | | | | | |
| (Qatar) 2029 | Future event | | | | | | | |
| Total | | 9/20 | 76 | 25 | 51 | 106 | 165 | — |

=== World League ===
World League record
| Year | Round | Position | Pld | W | L | SW | SL |
|---|---|---|---|---|---|---|---|
| (Japan) 1990 | 1990 to 2013 Did not participate | | | | | | |
| (Italy) 1991 | 1990 to 2013 Did not participate | | | | | | |
| (Italy) 1992 | 1990 to 2013 Did not participate | | | | | | |
| (Italy) 1994 | 1990 to 2013 Did not participate | | | | | | |
| (Argentina) 1999 | 1990 to 2013 Did not participate | | | | | | |
| (Brazil) 2002 | 1990 to 2013 Did not participate | | | | | | |
| (Bulgaria) 2012 | 1990 to 2013 Did not participate | | | | | | |
| (Argentina) 2013 | 1990 to 2013 Did not participate | | | | | | |
| (Italy) 2014 | G2 FR | 11th | 14 | 8 | 6 | 32 | 23 |
| (Brazil) 2015 | G2 FR | 12th | 14 | 10 | 4 | 35 | 23 |
| (Poland) 2016 | Group Stage | 9th | 9 | 3 | 6 | 15 | 20 |
| (Brazil) 2017 | Group Stage | 7th | 9 | 4 | 5 | 18 | 19 |
| Total | | 4/28 | 46 | 25 | 21 | 100 | 85 |

=== Nations League ===
Nations League record
| Year | Round | Position | GP | MW | ML | SW | SL | Squad |
|---|---|---|---|---|---|---|---|---|
| (France) 2018 | Did not qualify | | | | | | | |
| (United States) 2019 | Did not qualify | | | | | | | |
| (Italy) 2021 | Did not qualify | | | | | | | |
| (Italy) 2022 | Did not qualify | | | | | | | |
| (Poland) 2023 | Did not qualify | | | | | | | |
| (Poland) 2024 | Did not qualify | | | | | | | |
| (China) 2025 | Did not qualify | | | | | | | |
| (China) 2026 | Preliminary round | 14th | 12 | 4 | 8 | 17 | 28 | Squad |
| Total | 0 Titles | 1/8 | 12 | 4 | 8 | 17 | 28 | — |

=== Challenger Cup ===
Challenger Cup record
| Year | Round | Position | Pld | W | L | SW | SL |
|---|---|---|---|---|---|---|---|
| (Portugal) 2018 | Did not qualify | | | | | | |
| (Slovenia) 2019 | Did not qualify | | | | | | |
| (South Korea) 2022 | Did not qualify | | | | | | |
| (Qatar) 2023 | Did not qualify | | | | | | |
| (China) 2024 | Final | 2nd | 3 | 2 | 1 | 7 | 7 |
| Total | | 1/5 | 3 | 2 | 1 | 7 | 7 |

=== European Championship ===
European Championship record
| Year | Round | Position | Pld | W | L | SW | SL |
|---|---|---|---|---|---|---|---|
| (Italy) 1948 | Round Robin | 5th | 5 | 1 | 4 | 3 | 13 |
| (Bulgaria) 1950 | Did not participate | | | | | | |
| (France) 1951 | Final Round | 6th | 7 | 1 | 6 | 4 | 18 |
| (Romania) 1955 | 9th-14th play-offs | 12th | 7 | 3 | 4 | 11 | 15 |
| (Czechoslovak Socialist Republic) 1958 | 17th-20th play-offs | 17th | 7 | 3 | 4 | 13 | 12 |
| (Romania) 1963 | 9th-17th play-offs | 13th | 10 | 4 | 6 | 14 | 18 |
| (Turkey) 1967 | 9th-16th play-offs | 12th | 9 | 5 | 4 | 17 | 17 |
| (Italy) 1971 | 7th-12th play-offs | 10th | 6 | 2 | 4 | 7 | 14 |
| (Socialist Federal Republic of Yugoslavia) 1975 | 7th-12th play-offs | 12th | 8 | 0 | 8 | 10 | 24 |
| (Finland) 1977 | Did not qualify | | | | | | |
| (France) 1979 | 7th-12th play-offs | 11th | 8 | 1 | 7 | 8 | 18 |
| (Bulgaria) 1981 | Did not qualify | | | | | | |
| (East Germany) 1983 | Did not qualify | | | | | | |
| (Netherlands) 1985 | Did not qualify | | | | | | |
| (Belgium) 1987 | 7th-8th play-offs | 7th | 7 | 3 | 4 | 15 | 12 |
| (Sweden) 1989 | Did not qualify | | | | | | |
| (Germany) 1991 | Did not qualify | | | | | | |
| (Finland) 1993 | Did not qualify | | | | | | |
| (Greece) 1995 | Did not qualify | | | | | | |
| (Netherlands) 1997 | Did not qualify | | | | | | |
| (Austria) 1999 | Did not qualify | | | | | | |
| (Czech Republic) 2001 | Did not qualify | | | | | | |
| (Germany) 2003 | Did not qualify | | | | | | |
| (Italy) (Serbia and Montenegro) 2005 | Did not qualify | | | | | | |
| (Russia) 2007 | Second Round | 10th | 6 | 4 | 2 | 8 | 15 |
| (Turkey) 2009 | Did not qualify | | | | | | |
| (Austria) (Czech Republic) 2011 | First Round | 13th | 3 | 1 | 2 | 4 | 7 |
| (Denmark) (Poland) 2013 | Quarter Final | 7th | 4 | 3 | 1 | 10 | 6 |
| (Bulgaria) (Italy) 2015 | Play-Offs | 10th | 4 | 2 | 2 | 6 | 7 |
| (Poland) 2017 | Third place game | 4th | 6 | 4 | 2 | 14 | 10 |
| (Belgium) (France) (Netherlands) (Slovenia) 2019 | Round of 16 | 9th | 6 | 4 | 2 | 14 | 8 |
| (Finland) (Estonia) (Czech Republic) (Poland) 2021 | Preliminary round | 18th | 5 | 1 | 4 | 7 | 12 |
| (Italy) (Bulgaria) (North Macedonia) (Israel) 2023 | Round of 16 | 14th | 6 | 2 | 4 | 10 | 13 |
| (Italy) (Bulgaria) (Finland) (Romania) 2026 | Quarter Final | 6th | 7 | 5 | 2 | 18 | 10 |
| (N/A) / (N/A) / (N/A) / (Montenegro) 2028 | To be determined | | | | | | |
| Total | | 19/35 | 121 | 49 | 72 | 193 | 249 |

=== European Volleyball League ===
Champions Runners-up Third place Fourth place

European Volleyball League record
| Year | Round | Position | Pld | W | L | SW | SL |
|---|---|---|---|---|---|---|---|
| (Czech Republic) 2004 | Did not participate | | | | | | |
| (Russia) 2005 | Did not participate | | | | | | |
| (Turkey) 2006 | Did not participate | | | | | | |
| (Portugal) 2007 | Group stage | 12th | 12 | 2 | 10 | 13 | 33 |
| (Turkey) 2008 | Did not participate | | | | | | |
| (Portugal) 2009 | Group stage | 5th | 12 | 8 | 4 | 30 | 20 |
| (Spain) 2010 | Did not participate | | | | | | |
| (Slovakia) 2011 | Group stage | 6th | 12 | 7 | 5 | 26 | 24 |
| (Turkey) 2012 | Did not participate | | | | | | |
| (Turkey) 2013 | Champions | 1st | 14 | 14 | 0 | 42 | 7 |
| (Czech Republic) 2018 | Group stage | 6th | 6 | 4 | 2 | 13 | 9 |
| (Estonia) 2019 | Group stage | 11th | 6 | 1 | 5 | 8 | 17 |
| (Belgium) 2021 | Final round | 4th | 8 | 4 | 4 | 15 | 15 |
| (Croatia) 2022 | Group stage | 7th | 6 | 2 | 4 | 8 | 12 |
| (Croatia) 2023 | Group stage | 7th | 6 | 2 | 4 | 8 | 13 |
| (Croatia) 2024 | Group stage | 5th | 6 | 4 | 2 | 13 | 12 |
| (Czech Republic) 2025 | Did not participate | | | | | | |
| (Finland) (Netherlands) 2026 | Did not participate | | | | | | |
| Total | 1 Title | 10/18 | 88 | 48 | 40 | 176 | 162 |

== Current squad ==
The following is the Belgian roster in the 2025 FIVB Men's Volleyball World Championship.

Head coach: Emanuele Zanini

| No. | Name | Date of birth | Height | Weight | Spike | Block | 2023–24 club |
|---|---|---|---|---|---|---|---|
| 1 | Jolan Cox | 12 July 1991 | 1.94 m (6 ft 4 in) | 73 kg (161 lb) | 354 cm (139 in) | 333 cm (131 in) | (Belgium) Greenyard Maaseik |
| 2 | Ferre Reggers | 18 July 2003 | 2.03 m (6 ft 8 in) | 83 kg (183 lb) | 353 cm (139 in) | 335 cm (132 in) | (Italy) Allianz Milano |
| 3 | Sam Deroo (C) | 29 April 1992 | 2.03 m (6 ft 8 in) | 105 kg (231 lb) | 355 cm (140 in) | 335 cm (132 in) | (Russia) VC Lokomotiv Novosibirsk |
| 4 | Stijn D'Hulst | 24 April 1991 | 1.87 m (6 ft 2 in) | 75 kg (165 lb) | 321 cm (126 in) | 305 cm (120 in) | (Belgium) Knack Roeselare |
| 5 | Pieter Coolman | 24 April 1989 | 2.01 m (6 ft 7 in) | 91 kg (201 lb) | 353 cm (139 in) | 346 cm (136 in) | (Belgium) Knack Roeselare |
| 6 | Simon Plaskie | 10 March 2001 | 1.90 m (6 ft 3 in) | 77 kg (170 lb) | 333 cm (131 in) | 313 cm (123 in) | (Germany) Berlin Recycling Volleys |
| 9 | Wout D'Heer | 26 April 2001 | 2.02 m (6 ft 8 in) | 80 kg (180 lb) | 345 cm (136 in) | 320 cm (130 in) | (Italy) Volley Lube |
| 10 | Mathijs Desmet | 28 January 2000 | 1.96 m (6 ft 5 in) | 89 kg (196 lb) | 341 cm (134 in) | 315 cm (124 in) | (Belgium) Knack Roeselare |
| 11 | Seppe Van Hoyweghen | 7 October 2000 | 1.98 m (6 ft 6 in) | 93 kg (205 lb) | 339 cm (133 in) | 310 cm (120 in) | (Belgium) Knack Roeselare |
| 12 | Seppe Rotty | 10 March 2001 | 1.90 m (6 ft 3 in) | 84 kg (185 lb) | 345 cm (136 in) | 325 cm (128 in) | (Italy) Volley Milano |
| 13 | Kobe Verwimp | 13 January 2005 | 1.81 m (5 ft 11 in) | 67 kg (148 lb) | 328 cm (129 in) | | (Belgium) Volley Haasrode Leuven |
| 15 | Basil Dermaux | 9 February 2003 | 1.95 m (6 ft 5 in) | | | | (Belgium) Knack Roeselare |
| 19 | Gorik Lantsoght | 9 December 2005 | 1.86 m (6 ft 1 in) | | | | (Belgium) Thuismakers Brabo Antwerp VT |
| 21 | Samuel Fafchamps | 3 February 2001 | 2.01 m (6 ft 7 in) | 95 kg (209 lb) | | | (Belgium) Greenyard Maaseik |
| 23 | Pierre Perin | 20 February 2004 | 1.91 m (6 ft 3 in) | 84 kg (185 lb) | | | (Belgium) Greenyard Maaseik |
