= Tonček Štern =

Slovenian volleyball player (born 1995)

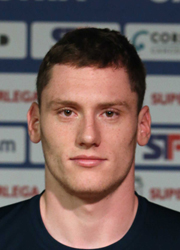

Personal information
- Nationality: Slovenian
- Born: 14 November 1995 (age 30) Maribor, Slovenia
- Height: 2.00 m (6 ft 7 in)
- Weight: 93 kg (205 lb)
- Spike: 358 cm (141 in)
- Block: 340 cm (134 in)

Volleyball information
- Position: Opposite
- Current club: ACH Volley

Career
- Years: Team
- 2013–2016 2016–2018 2018–2019 2019 2019–2020 2020 2020–2021 2021–2022 2022–2024 2024–2025 2025–: Calcit Kamnik; BluVolley Verona; Top Volley Latina; Al Arabi Doha; BKS Visła Bydgoszcz; Halkbank Ankara; Kioene Padova; Gas Sales Piacenza; Olympiacos; Ziraat Bankası; ACH Volley

National team
- Years: Team
- 2014–: Slovenia
Honours
Men's volleyball
Representing Slovenia
FIVB Challenger Cup
Gold medal – first place	2019 Slovenia
CEV European Championship
Silver medal – second place	2019 France/Slovenia/Belgium/Netherlands
Silver medal – second place	2021 Poland/Czech Republic/Estonia/Finland

Tonček Štern (born 14 November 1995) is a Slovenian volleyball player who plays for ACH Volley and the Slovenia national team. With Slovenia, he was the runner-up of the European Volleyball Championship in 2019 and 2021. He also represented the country at the 2024 Summer Olympics.

== Personal life ==
Štern has an older brother, Žiga, who is also a volleyball player.

== Honours ==
Olympiacos Piraeus

- CEV Challenge Cup: 2022–23
- Hellenic Championship: 2022–23, 2023–24
- Hellenic Cup: 2024

Individual

- U20 Volleyball European Championship best spiker: 2014
- U21 Volleyball World Championship best scorer: 2015
- Hellenic Championship best opposite: 2022–23
