= 2024 FIVB Men's Volleyball Nations League =

Siatkarskiej Ligi Narodów 2024 (Polish)

Tournament details
- Host country: Poland
- City: Łódź (final round)
- Dates: 21 May – 30 June
- Teams: 16 (from 4 confederations)
- Venue: 7 (in 7 host cities)

Final positions
- Champions: France (2nd title)
- Runners-up: Japan
- Third place: Poland
- Fourth place: Slovenia

Tournament awards
- MVP: (France) Antoine Brizard
- Best Setter: (France) Antoine Brizard
- Best OH: (Japan) Yūki Ishikawa; (Poland) Tomasz Fornal
- Best MB: (France) Nicolas Le Goff; (Poland) Jakub Kochanowski
- Best OPP: (France) Jean Patry
- Best Libero: (Japan) Tomohiro Yamamoto

Tournament statistics
- Matches played: 104
- Attendance: 356,729 (3,430 per match)

The 2024 FIVB Men's Volleyball Nations League was the sixth edition of the FIVB Men's Volleyball Nations League, an annual men's international volleyball tournament. The competition was held from 21 May to 30 June 2024, with the final round taking place at the Atlas Arena, Łódź, Poland.

Following the results of the 2023 Nations League and the 2023 Challenger Cup, China were replaced by debutants Turkey in this edition.

France won their second VNL title after a four-set match against Japan in the final. It was Japan's first silver medal in 47 years. Finals host Poland swept Slovenia in the third place match to bag their third bronze medal. Antoine Brizard from France was named the MVP of the tournament.

== Teams ==
=== Qualification ===
Sixteen teams qualified for the competition. Ten of them qualified as core teams, which cannot face relegation, with the other six teams selected as the challenger teams that could be relegated from the tournament. Turkey replaced China after winning the 2023 Challenger Cup. In a change of format for the next edition, none of the current teams will be relegated, and from the year 2025 onwards the competition will expand to 18 teams. The two extra spots will be from the team that wins the 2024 Challenger Cup and the best FIVB ranked team who are not in this year event.

Country	Confederation	Designation	Previous appearances			Previous best performance
Country	Confederation	Designation	Total	First	Last	Previous best performance
Argentina	CSV	Core team	5	2018	2023	5th place (2023)
Brazil	CSV	Core team	5	2018	2023	Champions (2021)
Bulgaria	CEV	Challenger team	5	2018	2023	11th place (2018)
Canada	NORCECA	Challenger team	5	2018	2023	7th place (2018)
Cuba	NORCECA	Challenger team	1	2023		13th place (2023)
France	CEV	Core team	5	2018	2023	Champions (2022)
Germany	CEV	Core team	5	2018	2023	9th place (2018)
Iran	AVC	Core team	5	2018	2023	5th place (2019)
Italy	CEV	Core team	5	2018	2023	4th place (2022, 2023)
Japan	AVC	Core team	5	2018	2023	Third place (2023)
Netherlands	CEV	Challenger team	3	2021	2023	8th place (2022)
Poland	CEV	Core team	5	2018	2023	Champions (2023)
Serbia	CEV	Core team	5	2018	2023	5th place (2018)
Slovenia	CEV	Challenger team	3	2021	2023	4th place (2021)
Turkey	CEV	Challenger team	0	None		Debut
United States	NORCECA	Core team	5	2018	2023	Runners-up (2019, 2022, 2023)

== Format ==
=== Preliminary round ===
The format of play is generally the same as in the 2022 edition. However, the current format has the 16 men's teams competing in pools of 8 teams during the pool phase. Each team play 12 matches during the pool stage. Eight teams will then move into the final knockout phase of the competition.

=== Final round ===
The VNL Finals will see the top eight teams moving directly to the knockout phase, which will consist of eight matches in total: four quarterfinals, two semi-finals, and the bronze and gold medal matches.

Final 8 direct elimination formula:

- The first ranked team will play a quarterfinal match against the eighth ranked team, the second ranked team will play a quarterfinal match against the seventh ranked team, the third ranked team will play a quarterfinal match against the sixth ranked team, and the fourth ranked team will play a quarterfinal match against the fifth ranked team.
- The national team of the hosting territory of the event will have a guaranteed berth for the Final round. If the host nation team do not finish in the top eight in the Preliminary round, they will replace the eighth place team and play as the eighth seed.

== Pool composition ==
The overview of pools was released on 8 December 2023.

Week 1		Week 2		Week 3	
Pool 1 Turkey	Pool 2 Brazil	Pool 3 Japan	Pool 4 Canada	Pool 5 Slovenia	Pool 6 Philippines
Turkey; Poland; United States; Slovenia; France; Netherlands; Canada; Bulgaria	Brazil; Italy; Argentina; Japan; Serbia; Iran; Cuba; Germany	Japan; Brazil; Poland; Slovenia; Iran; Turkey; Bulgaria; Germany	Canada; Italy; United States; France; Argentina; Serbia; Netherlands; Cuba	Slovenia; Poland; Italy; Argentina; Serbia; Turkey; Cuba; Bulgaria	Japan; United States; Brazil; France; Iran; Netherlands; Germany; Canada

== Venues ==
=== Preliminary round ===
Week 1
Pool 1	Pool 2
Antalya, Turkey	Rio de Janeiro, Brazil
Antalya Sports Hall	Ginásio do Maracanãzinho
Capacity: 10,000	Capacity: 11,800
Antalya spor arena	
Week 2
Pool 3	Pool 4
Fukuoka, Japan	Ottawa, Canada
West Japan General Exhibition Center	TD Place Arena
Capacity: 7,900	Capacity: 5,500
Week 3
Pool 5	Pool 6
Ljubljana, Slovenia	Manila, Philippines
Arena Stožice	SM Mall of Asia Arena
Capacity: 12,480	Capacity: 15,000

=== Final round ===
All matches
Łódź, Poland
Atlas Arena
Capacity: 13,805
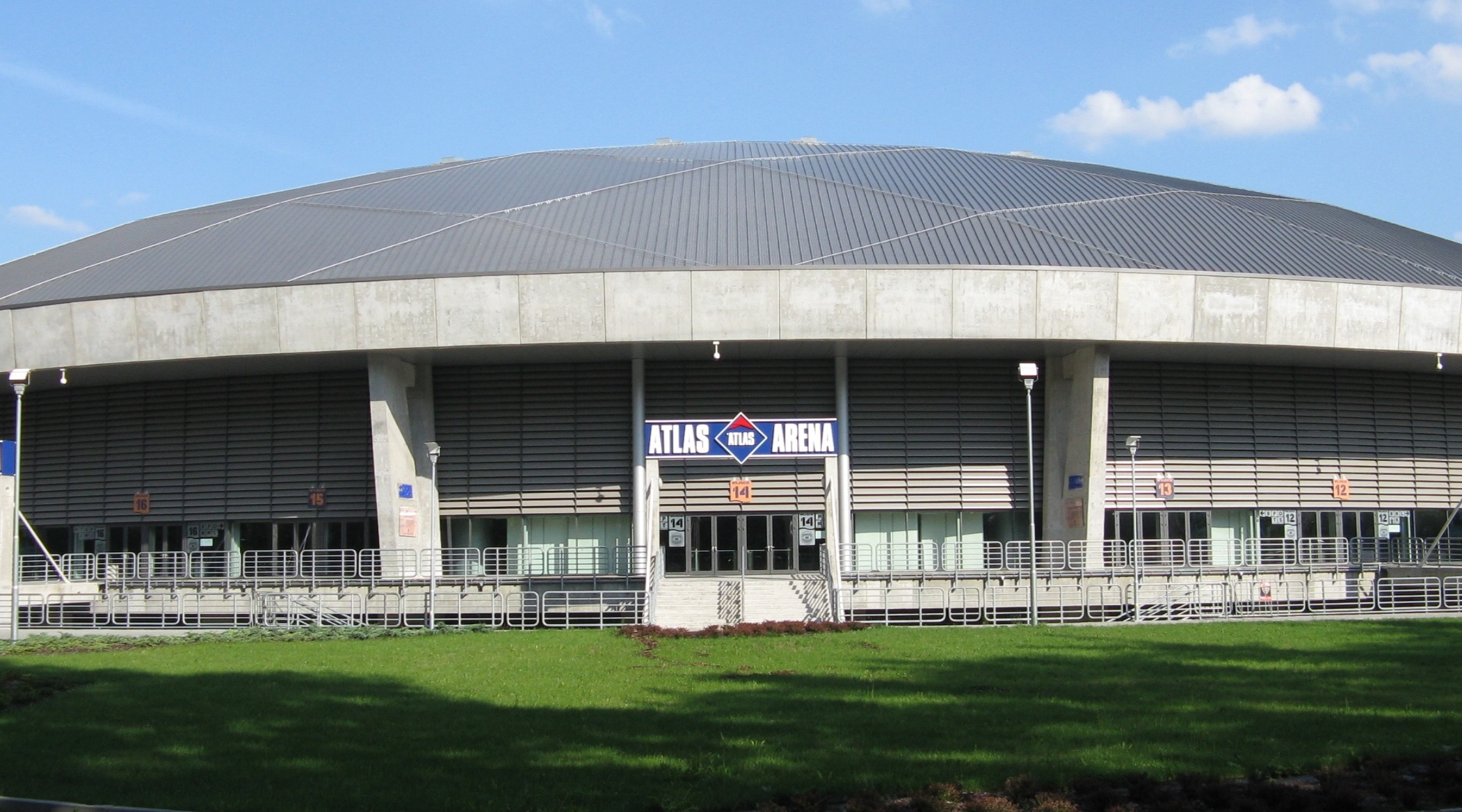

== Competition schedule ==
●	Preliminary round	●	Final round

Week 1 21–26 May	Week 2 4–9 Jun	Week 3 18–23 Jun	Week 4 27–30 Jun
32 matches	32 matches	32 matches	8 matches

== Pool standing procedure ==
1. Total number of victories (matches won, matches lost)
2. In the event of a tie, the following first tiebreaker will apply, with the teams ranked by the most points gained per match as follows:
  - Match won 3–0 or 3–1: 3 points for the winner, 0 points for the loser
  - Match won 3–2: 2 points for the winner, 1 point for the loser
  - Match forfeited: 3 points for the winner, 0 points (0–25, 0–25, 0–25) for the loser
3. If teams are still tied after examining the number of victories and points gained, the FIVB will examine the results in order to break the tie in the following order:
  - Sets quotient: if two or more teams are tied on the number of points gained, they will be ranked by the quotient resulting from the division of the number of all sets won by the number of all sets lost.
  - Points quotient: if the tie persists based on the sets quotient, the teams will be ranked by the quotient resulting from the division of all points scored by the total of points lost during all sets.
  - If the tie persists based on the points quotient, the tie will be broken based on the team that won the match between the tied teams during the Round Robin Phase. When the tie in points quotient is between three or more teams, these teams will be ranked taking into consideration only the matches involving the teams in question.

== Preliminary round ==
=== Ranking ===
Pos	Team	Pld	W	L	Pts	SW	SL	SR	SPW	SPL	SPR	Qualification
1	Slovenia	12	11	1	28	34	14	2.429	1145	1026	1.116	Final round
2	Poland (Note: Qualified as host)	12	10	2	29	31	10	3.100	973	856	1.137	Final round
3	Italy	12	9	3	27	29	14	2.071	1006	884	1.138	Final round
4	Japan	12	9	3	25	30	17	1.765	1039	1019	1.020	Final round
5	Canada	12	8	4	23	29	19	1.526	1089	1071	1.017	Final round
6	France	12	8	4	23	30	20	1.500	1122	1070	1.049	Final round
7	Brazil	12	6	6	21	27	24	1.125	1154	1106	1.043	Final round
8	Argentina	12	6	6	18	23	24	0.958	1049	1049	1.000	Final round
9	Cuba	12	5	7	17	24	26	0.923	1109	1132	0.980	
10	Serbia	12	5	7	17	23	26	0.885	1051	1094	0.961	
11	Germany	12	5	7	15	20	25	0.800	1018	1048	0.971	
12	United States	12	5	7	15	19	26	0.731	1015	1047	0.969	
13	Netherlands	12	3	9	11	17	31	0.548	1057	1107	0.955	
14	Bulgaria	12	3	9	8	12	31	0.387	900	1033	0.871	
15	Iran	12	2	10	6	14	34	0.412	1026	1111	0.923	
16	Turkey	12	1	11	5	13	34	0.382	1024	1124	0.911	

Source: VNL 2024 – Men's standings

=== Week 1 ===
==== Pool 1 ====
- All times are Turkey Standard Time (UTC+03:00).

Date	Time		Score		Set 1	Set 2	Set 3	Set 4	Set 5	Total	Report
21 May	17:00	Bulgaria	0–3	France	21–25	24–26	14–25			59–76	P2 Report
21 May	20:00	Turkey	1–3	Canada	25–17	23–25	21–25	21–25		90–92	P2 Report
22 May	17:00	Netherlands	2–3	Slovenia	33–31	22–25	25–20	21–25	25–27	126–128	P2 Report
22 May	20:00	United States	0–3	Poland	22–25	15–25	24–26			61–76	P2 Report
23 May	14:00	Slovenia	3–1	France	25–18	25–22	23–25	25–21		98–86	P2 Report
23 May	17:00	Canada	1–3	Poland	25–18	20–25	23–25	21–25		89–93	P2 Report
23 May	20:00	Turkey	2–3	Netherlands	25–19	25–20	18–25	21–25	9–15	98–104	P2 Report
24 May	14:00	Bulgaria	0–3	Canada	22–25	28–30	24–26			74–81	P2 Report
24 May	17:00	France	3–0	United States	25–22	25–21	25–21			75–64	P2 Report
24 May	20:00	Netherlands	0–3	Poland	28–30	23–25	18–25			69–80	P2 Report
25 May	14:00	Slovenia	3–2	Canada	22–25	25–18	25–18	21–25	15–10	108–96	P2 Report
25 May	17:00	Turkey	1–3	France	27–25	23–25	16–25	14–25		80–100	P2 Report
25 May	20:00	Bulgaria	3–1	United States	25–21	25–20	21–25	25–21		96–87	P2 Report
26 May	14:00	Slovenia	3–0	Poland	25–20	25–21	25–18			75–59	P2 Report
26 May	17:00	Turkey	1–3	United States	25–20	22–25	25–27	21–25		93–97	P2 Report
26 May	20:00	Bulgaria	1–3	Netherlands	16–25	25–20	13–25	20–25		74–95	P2 Report

==== Pool 2 ====
- All times are Brasília Time (UTC−03:00).

Date	Time		Score		Set 1	Set 2	Set 3	Set 4	Set 5	Total	Report
21 May	17:30	Argentina	1–3	Japan	26–24	22–25	23–25	19–25		90–99	P2 Report
21 May	21:00	Cuba	3–1	Brazil	25–23	27–29	25–21	25–21		102–94	P2 Report
22 May	17:30	Germany	0–3	Italy	21–25	18–25	23–25			62–75	P2 Report
22 May	21:00	Iran	1–3	Serbia	25–27	25–17	19–25	18–25		87–94	P2 Report
23 May	14:00	Cuba	3–1	Germany	26–24	25–20	18–25	25–23		94–92	P2 Report
23 May	17:30	Japan	3–0	Serbia	25–20	25–16	25–22			75–58	P2 Report
23 May	21:00	Argentina	2–3	Brazil	13–25	25–20	25–19	23–25	11–15	97–104	P2 Report
24 May	14:00	Cuba	2–3	Japan	25–18	22–25	23–25	25–19	20–22	115–109	P2 Report
24 May	17:30	Iran	0–3	Italy	19–25	18–25	11–25			48–75	P2 Report
24 May	21:00	Serbia	1–3	Brazil	21–25	20–25	25–22	22–25		88–97	P2 Report
25 May	14:00	Japan	1–3	Italy	25–23	16–25	17–25	17–25		75–98	P2 Report
25 May	17:30	Argentina	3–1	Germany	21–25	25–19	25–21	25–21		96–86	P2 Report
25 May	21:00	Cuba	3–1	Iran	25–20	14–25	25–21	25–21		89–87	P2 Report
26 May	10:00	Brazil	2–3	Italy	25–17	15–25	25–22	17–25	13–15	95–104	P2 Report
26 May	14:00	Serbia	0–3	Germany	21–25	20–25	20–25			61–75	P2 Report
26 May	17:30	Iran	2–3	Argentina	25–23	29–31	25–20	20–25	13–15	112–114	P2 Report

=== Week 2 ===
==== Pool 3 ====
- All times are Japan Standard Time (UTC+09:00).

Date	Time		Score		Set 1	Set 2	Set 3	Set 4	Set 5	Total	Report
4 Jun	12:00	Germany	0–3	Brazil	15–25	16–25	15–25			46–75	P2 Report
4 Jun	15:30	Poland	3–1	Bulgaria	21–25	25–21	25–19	25–18		96–83	P2 Report
4 Jun	19:20	Iran	0–3	Japan	23–25	22–25	17–25			62–75	P2 Report
5 Jun	15:30	Slovenia	3–0	Turkey	25–22	26–24	25–20			76–66	P2 Report
5 Jun	19:20	Germany	2–3	Japan	22–25	25–22	27–25	23–25	8–15	105–112	P2 Report
6 Jun	12:00	Iran	1–3	Brazil	19–25	25–22	16–25	23–25		83–97	P2 Report
6 Jun	15:30	Bulgaria	1–3	Germany	24–26	25–22	16–25	16–25		81–98	P2 Report
6 Jun	19:20	Poland	3–0	Turkey	25–19	25–12	25–19			75–50	P2 Report
7 Jun	12:00	Bulgaria	3–2	Iran	20–25	25–22	25–23	20–25	15–11	105–106	P2 Report
7 Jun	15:30	Brazil	2–3	Slovenia	25–27	25–23	24–26	25–21	12–15	111–112	P2 Report
7 Jun	19:20	Japan	0–3	Poland	17–25	15–25	20–25			52–75	P2 Report
8 Jun	12:00	Turkey	3–1	Iran	22–25	25–23	25–23	27–25		99–96	P2 Report
8 Jun	15:30	Poland	1–3	Brazil	21–25	17–25	25–21	23–25		86–96	P2 Report
8 Jun	19:20	Japan	3–1	Slovenia	25–23	19–25	26–24	25–21		95–93	P2 Report
9 Jun	15:30	Turkey	2–3	Germany	22–25	44–42	23–25	25–19	12–15	126–126	P2 Report
9 Jun	19:20	Bulgaria	0–3	Slovenia	23–25	14–25	21–25			58–75	P2 Report

==== Pool 4 ====
- All times are Eastern Daylight Time (UTC−04:00).

Date	Time		Score		Set 1	Set 2	Set 3	Set 4	Set 5	Total	Report
4 Jun	16:30	Argentina	0–3	United States	23–25	21–25	24–26			68–76	P2 Report
4 Jun	20:00	Canada	3–1	Cuba	25–21	25–27	25–20	28–26		103–94	P2 Report
5 Jun	16:30	Serbia	3–0	Netherlands	25–17	25–20	26–24			76–61	P2 Report
5 Jun	20:00	France	3–2	Italy	25–23	18–25	25–23	19–25	15–10	102–106	P2 Report
6 Jun	11:00	Cuba	1–3	Netherlands	24–26	25–21	20–25	22–25		91–97	P2 Report
6 Jun	16:30	United States	0–3	Italy	23–25	24–26	20–25			67–76	P2 Report
6 Jun	20:00	Canada	1–3	Argentina	18–25	25–22	21–25	20–25		84–97	P2 Report
7 Jun	11:00	Cuba	1–3	Italy	21–25	25–22	19–25	13–25		78–97	P2 Report
7 Jun	16:30	France	3–1	Netherlands	25–20	20–25	25–19	25–22		95–86	P2 Report
7 Jun	20:00	United States	3–1	Serbia	23–25	25–15	25–23	25–14		98–77	P2 Report
8 Jun	13:00	Cuba	3–2	France	25–18	20–25	23–25	25–22	15–10	108–100	P2 Report
8 Jun	16:30	Canada	3–1	United States	25–16	19–25	26–24	28–26		98–91	P2 Report
8 Jun	20:00	Serbia	2–3	Argentina	26–28	18–25	25–18	25–22	13–15	107–108	P2 Report
9 Jun	11:00	Italy	3–0	Netherlands	25–18	25–15	25–21			75–54	P2 Report
9 Jun	14:30	Argentina	2–3	France	19–25	17–25	25–22	28–26	9–15	98–113	P2 Report
9 Jun	18:00	Canada	1–3	Serbia	25–21	20–25	18–25	23–25		86–96	P2 Report

=== Week 3 ===
==== Pool 5 ====
- All times are Central European Summer Time (UTC+02:00).

Date	Time		Score		Set 1	Set 2	Set 3	Set 4	Set 5	Total	Report
18 Jun	16:30	Bulgaria	3–1	Turkey	27–25	25–20	12–25	25–22		89–92	P2 Report
18 Jun	20:30	Slovenia	3–0	Argentina	25–23	25–22	29–27			79–72	P2 Report
19 Jun	16:30	Cuba	2–3	Serbia	25–22	25–21	16–25	21–25	12–15	99–108	P2 Report
19 Jun	20:30	Italy	0–3	Poland	22–25	21–25	22–25			65–75	P2 Report
20 Jun	13:00	Turkey	0–3	Argentina	17–25	18–25	20–25			55–75	P2 Report
20 Jun	16:30	Bulgaria	0–3	Italy	25–27	20–25	21–25			66–77	P2 Report
20 Jun	20:30	Cuba	2–3	Slovenia	22–25	25–20	21–25	31–29	8–15	107–114	P2 Report
21 Jun	13:00	Argentina	0–3	Poland	19–25	18–25	22–25			59–75	P2 Report
21 Jun	16:30	Bulgaria	0–3	Cuba	18–25	20–25	18–25			56–75	P2 Report
21 Jun	20:30	Turkey	1–3	Serbia	25–20	19–25	23–25	21–25		88–95	P2 Report
22 Jun	13:00	Bulgaria	0–3	Argentina	22–25	17–25	20–25			59–75	P2 Report
22 Jun	16:30	Serbia	2–3	Poland	21–25	25–21	18–25	25–22	11–15	100–108	P2 Report
22 Jun	20:30	Slovenia	3–0	Italy	25–19	25–21	25–19			75–59	P2 Report
23 Jun	13:00	Cuba	0–3	Poland	17–25	20–25	20–25			57–75	P2 Report
23 Jun	16:30	Turkey	1–3	Italy	21–25	26–24	19–25	21–25		87–99	P2 Report
23 Jun	20:30	Serbia	2–3	Slovenia	13–25	27–25	14–25	25–22	12–15	91–112	P2 Report

==== Pool 6 ====
- All times are Philippine Standard Time (UTC+08:00).

Date	Time		Score		Set 1	Set 2	Set 3	Set 4	Set 5	Total	Report
18 Jun	17:00	Netherlands	1–3	Brazil	26–24	23–25	29–31	20–25		98–105	P2 Report
18 Jun	20:30	Canada	3–2	Japan	25–21	20–25	25–15	20–25	15–10	105–96	P2 Report
19 Jun	15:00	Germany	3–1	France	25–23	25–27	25–20	25–23		100–93	P2 Report
19 Jun	19:00	Iran	3–2	United States	26–28	25–23	25–18	26–28	15–13	117–110	P2 Report
20 Jun	11:00	Germany	0–3	Canada	19–25	18–25	21–25			58–75	P2 Report
20 Jun	15:00	Iran	3–2	Netherlands	25–22	22–25	25–21	20–25	15–10	107–103	P2 Report
20 Jun	19:00	Brazil	2–3	United States	21–25	25–18	21–25	25–22	9–15	101–105	P2 Report
21 Jun	11:00	Iran	0–3	France	21–25	17–25	20–25			58–75	P2 Report
21 Jun	15:00	Canada	3–0	Brazil	26–24	25–19	26–24			77–67	P2 Report
21 Jun	19:00	Netherlands	0–3	Japan	18–25	19–25	20–25			57–75	P2 Report
22 Jun	11:00	Germany	1–3	United States	23–25	25–21	24–26	23–25		95–97	P2 Report
22 Jun	15:00	Canada	3–2	Netherlands	21–25	25–22	28–26	14–25	15–9	103–107	P2 Report
22 Jun	19:00	France	2–3	Japan	25–17	25–19	16–25	23–25	10–15	99–101	P2 Report
23 Jun	11:00	Germany	3–0	Iran	25–20	25–23	25–20			75–63	P2 Report
23 Jun	15:00	France	3–2	Brazil	25–23	27–29	13–25	25–19	18–16	108–112	P2 Report
23 Jun	19:00	Japan	3–0	United States	25–20	25–23	25–19			75–62	P2 Report

== Final round ==
- All times are Central European Summer Time (UTC+2:00).

Quarter-finals
28 June
Slovenia	3
Argentina	2
27 June
Japan	3
Canada	0
27 June
Poland	3
Brazil	1
28 June
Italy	2
France	3

Semi-finals
29 June
Slovenia	0
Japan	3
29 June
Poland	2
France	3

Final
30 June
Japan	1
France	3
Third place match
30 June
Slovenia	0
Poland	3

=== Quarter-finals ===
Date	Time		Score		Set 1	Set 2	Set 3	Set 4	Set 5	Total	Report
27 Jun	17:00	Japan	3–0	Canada	26–24	25–18	26–24			77–66	P2 Report
27 Jun	20:00	Poland	3–1	Brazil	18–25	25–23	25–22	25–16		93–86	P2 Report
28 Jun	17:00	Italy	2–3	France	25–19	20–25	25–22	22–25	11–15	103–106	P2 Report
28 Jun	20:00	Slovenia	3–2	Argentina	19–25	25–17	17–25	29–27	15–7	105–101	P2 Report

=== Semi-finals ===
Date	Time		Score		Set 1	Set 2	Set 3	Set 4	Set 5	Total	Report
29 Jun	17:00	Poland	2–3	France	25–22	22–25	23–25	25–20	16–18	111–110	P2 Report
29 Jun	20:00	Slovenia	0–3	Japan	21–25	25–27	29–31			75–83	P2 Report

=== Third place match ===
Date	Time		Score		Set 1	Set 2	Set 3	Set 4	Set 5	Total	Report
30 Jun	17:00	Slovenia	0–3	Poland	24–26	16–25	17–25			57–76	P2 Report

=== Final ===
Date	Time		Score		Set 1	Set 2	Set 3	Set 4	Set 5	Total	Report
30 Jun	20:00	Japan	1–3	France	23–25	25–18	23–25	23–25		94–93	P2 Report

== Final standing ==
Rank	Team
1st place, gold medalist(s)	France
2nd place, silver medalist(s)	Japan
3rd place, bronze medalist(s)	Poland
4	Slovenia
5	Italy
6	Canada
7	Brazil
8	Argentina
9	Cuba
10	Serbia
11	Germany
12	United States
13	Netherlands
14	Bulgaria
15	Iran
16	Turkey

2024 Men's VNL champions

France
Second title

14–man roster
Jenia Grebennikov, Jean Patry, Benjamin Toniutti (c), Kévin Tillie, Earvin N'Gapeth, Antoine Brizard, Nicolas Le Goff, Trévor Clévenot, Yacine Louati, Benjamin Diez, Théo Faure, Timothée Carle, Quentin Jouffroy, Joris Seddik
Head coach
Andrea Giani

== Awards ==
- Most valuable player
  Antoine Brizard (FRA)
- Best setter
  Antoine Brizard (FRA)
- Best outside spikers
  Yūki Ishikawa (JPN)
  Tomasz Fornal (POL)
- Best middle blocker
  Nicolas Le Goff (FRA)
  Jakub Kochanowski (POL)
- Best opposite spiker
  Jean Patry (FRA)
- Best libero
  Tomohiro Yamamoto (JPN)
- Fair play team award
  Slovenia

== Statistics leaders ==
=== Preliminary round ===
Statistics leaders correct at the end of preliminary round.

Best Scorers (Note: Best scorers determined by scored points from spike, block and serve.)
	Player	Attacks	Blocks	Serves	Total
1	(Slovenia) Tonček Štern	265	24	31	320
2	(Netherlands) Nimir Abdel-Aziz	235	9	40	284
3	(Canada) Stephen Maar	194	17	14	225
4	(Slovenia) Klemen Čebulj	179	21	18	218
5	(Cuba) Marlon Yant	167	15	14	196

Best Attackers (Note: Best attackers determined by successful spikes.)
	Player	Spikes	Faults	Shots	%	Total
1	(Slovenia) Tonček Štern	265	68	153	54.53	486
2	(Netherlands) Nimir Abdel-Aziz	235	81	138	51.76	454
3	(Canada) Stephen Maar	194	59	150	48.14	403
4	(Slovenia) Klemen Čebulj	179	63	149	45.78	391
5	(Cuba) Marlon Yant	167	49	98	53.18	314
5	(Iran) Amin Esmaeilnezhad	167	49	121	49.55	337

Best Blockers (Note: Best blockers determined by the stuff blocks, faults and rebounds.)
	Player	Blocks	Faults	Rebounds	Avg	Total
1	(France) Nicolas Le Goff	34	51	53	2.27	138
1	(Argentina) Agustín Loser	34	59	47	2.62	140
3	(Brazil) Flávio Gualberto	33	68	51	2.75	152
4	(Argentina) Nicolás Zerba	30	47	52	2.31	129
5	(Bulgaria) Aleks Grozdanov	29	40	55	2.42	124

Best Servers (Note: Best servers determined by aces, faults and hits.)
	Player	Aces	Faults	Hits	Avg	Total
1	(Netherlands) Nimir Abdel-Aziz	40	56	94	3.33	190
2	(Slovenia) Tonček Štern	31	55	178	2.07	264
3	(Serbia) Dražen Luburić	24	37	92	2.00	153
4	(Japan) Yuji Nishida	19	45	99	1.27	163
5	(Slovenia) Gregor Ropret	18	34	161	1.20	213
5	(Slovenia) Klemen Čebulj	18	45	143	1.20	206

Best Setters (Note: Best setters determined by running setts, faults and still sets.)
	Player	Running	Faults	Still	Avg	Total
1	(Slovenia) Gregor Ropret	359	9	831	23.93	1199
2	(Argentina) Luciano De Cecco	310	6	650	23.85	966
3	(Canada) Luke Herr	302	3	768	23.23	1073
4	(Bulgaria) Simeon Nikolov	276	9	555	23.00	840
5	(Brazil) Fernando Kreling	267	8	624	20.54	899

Best Diggers (Note: Best diggers determined by successful digs, faults and receptions.)
	Player	Digs	Faults	Receptions	Avg	Total
1	(Argentina) Santiago Danani	123	58	7	9.46	188
2	(Slovenia) Jani Kovačič	116	63	14	7.73	193
3	(France) Jenia Grebennikov	114	65	11	7.60	190
4	(Japan) Tomohiro Yamamoto	94	47	5	6.27	146
5	(Brazil) Thales Hoss	92	33	7	7.08	132

Best Receivers (Note: Best receivers determined by efficient receptions, faults and serve receptions.)
	Player	Excellents	Faults	Serve	%	Total
1	(Iran) Arman Salehi	90	16	164	33.33	270
2	(Slovenia) Klemen Čebulj	84	22	237	24.49	343
3	(Slovenia) Jani Kovačič	78	21	204	25.74	303
4	(France) Yacine Louati	71	13	204	24.65	288
5	(Brazil) Thales Hoss	65	15	161	26.97	241

=== Final round ===
Statistics leaders correct at the end of final round.

Best Scorers
	Player	Attacks	Blocks	Serves	Total
1	(Japan) Yūki Ishikawa	56	5	3	64
2	(Slovenia) Tonček Štern	53	5	4	62
3	(France) Jean Patry	51	4	3	58
4	(Slovenia) Klemen Čebulj	35	5	2	42
5	(Poland) Wilfredo León	29	6	4	39
5	(France) Trévor Clévenot	33	3	3	39

Best Attackers
	Player	Spikes	Faults	Shots	%	Total
1	(Japan) Yūki Ishikawa	56	19	30	53.33	105
2	(Slovenia) Tonček Štern	53	16	31	53.00	100
3	(France) Jean Patry	51	9	35	53.68	95
4	(Slovenia) Klemen Čebulj	35	15	26	46.05	76
5	(Japan) Yuji Nishida	33	9	18	55.00	60
5	(France) Trévor Clévenot	33	4	20	57.89	57

Best Blockers
	Player	Blocks	Faults	Rebounds	Avg	Total
1	(France) Nicolas Le Goff	13	22	11	4.33	46
2	(Poland) Marcin Janusz	8	5	5	2.67	18
3	(Poland) Tomasz Fornal	7	13	7	2.33	27
4	(Poland) Wilfredo León	6	2	3	2.00	11
4	(Poland) Jakub Kochanowski	6	11	6	2.00	23

Best Servers
	Player	Aces	Faults	Hits	Avg	Total
1	(Japan) Tatsunori Otsuka	4	3	35	1.33	42
1	(Poland) Wilfredo León	4	8	19	1.33	31
1	(Poland) Mateusz Bieniek	4	6	36	1.33	46
1	(Poland) Tomasz Fornal	4	10	32	1.33	46
1	(Slovenia) Tonček Štern	4	8	27	1.33	39

Best Setters
	Player	Running	Faults	Still	Avg	Total
1	(Poland) Marcin Janusz	67	0	133	22.33	200
2	(France) Antoine Brizard	65	0	135	21.67	200
3	(Slovenia) Gregor Ropret	57	5	174	19.00	236
4	(Japan) Masahiro Sekita	52	0	168	17.33	220
5	(Argentina) Luciano De Cecco	34	1	64	34.00	99

Best Diggers
	Player	Digs	Faults	Receptions	Avg	Total
1	(Japan) Tomohiro Yamamoto	28	17	0	9.33	45
2	(France) Jenia Grebennikov	27	19	2	9.00	48
3	(Slovenia) Jani Kovačič	25	9	4	8.33	38
4	(Japan) Tatsunori Otsuka	18	12	3	6.00	33
5	(Slovenia) Klemen Čebulj	16	8	1	5.33	25

Best Receivers
	Player	Excellents	Faults	Serve	%	Total
1	(Slovenia) Klemen Čebulj	20	10	41	28.17	71
2	(Slovenia) Jani Kovačič	13	2	34	26.53	49
3	(Japan) Yūki Ishikawa	12	5	39	21.43	56
3	(Poland) Tomasz Fornal	12	4	47	19.05	63
5	(France) Kévin Tillie	11	1	36	22.92	48
5	(France) Trévor Clévenot	11	2	55	16.18	68
5	(France) Yacine Louati	11	2	54	16.42	67

== See also ==
- 2024 FIVB Men's Volleyball Challenger Cup
- 2024 FIVB Volleyball Boys' U17 World Championship
- Volleyball at the 2024 Summer Olympics
