= 2024 FIVB Men's Volleyball Challenger Cup =

Volleyball tournament

2024国际排联男排挑战者杯
- Official logo

Tournament details
- Host country: China
- City: Linyi
- Dates: 4–7 July
- Teams: 8 (from 5 confederations)
- Venue: 1 (in 1 host city)

Final positions
- Champions: China (1st title)
- Runners-up: Belgium
- Third place: Egypt
- Fourth place: Ukraine

Tournament statistics
- Matches played: 8
- Attendance: 31,073 (3,884 per match)
- Best scorer: (Belgium) Ferre Reggers (67 points)
- Best spiker: (Belgium) Ferre Reggers (48.33%)
- Best blocker: (Egypt) Mohamed Masoud (3.67 Avg)
- Best server: (Egypt) Reda Haikal (2.33 Avg)
- Best setter: (Ukraine) Serhii Yevstratov 32.00 Avg)
- Best digger: (Ukraine) Yaroslav Pampushko (9.33 Avg)
- Best receiver: (Belgium) Seppe Rotty (25.00%)

The 2024 FIVB Men's Volleyball Challenger Cup was the fifth and last edition of the FIVB Men's Volleyball Challenger Cup, an annual men's international volleyball tournament contested by eight national teams that acts as a qualifier for the FIVB Men's Volleyball Nations League. The tournament was held at Linyi Olympic Sports Park Stadium in Linyi, China, between 4 and 7 July 2024.

Three teams made their first appearance in the men's Challenger Cup in this edition: Belgium, Croatia and Mexico.

The host China won the title and earned the right to participate in the 2025 Nations League after defeating Belgium in the final. Egypt defeated Ukraine in the 3rd place match, but Ukraine still qualified for the 2025 Nations League through FIVB World Ranking.

== Qualification ==
A total of 8 teams qualified for the tournament.

Country	Confederation	Qualified as	Qualified on	Previous appearances			Previous best performance
Country	Confederation	Qualified as	Qualified on	Total	First	Last	Previous best performance
Egypt	CAVB	Highest ranked in CAVB	—N/a	1	2019		5th place (2019)
Chile	CSV	Highest ranked in CSV	—N/a	4	2018	2023	4th place (2023)
China	AVC	Host country	8 May 2024	1	2023		5th place (2023)
Mexico	NORCECA	2023 NORCECA Final Four champions	11 June 2023	0	None		None
Qatar	AVC	2024 Asian Challenge Cup champions	9 June 2024	2	2022	2023	Runners-up (2023)
Ukraine	CEV	2024 European Golden League champions	15 June 2024	1	2023		3rd place (2023)
Croatia	CEV	2024 European Golden League runners-up	15 June 2024	0	None		None
Belgium	CEV	World ranking	17 June 2024	0	None		None

== Format ==
The tournament competed in a knock-out format (quarterfinals, semifinals, and final), with the host country (China) playing its quarterfinal match against the lowest ranked team. The remaining six teams were placed from 2nd to 7th positions as per the FIVB World Ranking as of 17 June 2024. Rankings are shown in brackets except the host.

Match	Top ranker	Bottom ranker
Quarterfinal 1	China (Hosts)	Mexico (34)
Quarterfinal 2	Ukraine (14)	Chile (28)
Quarterfinal 3	Belgium (16)	Croatia (22)
Quarterfinal 4	Egypt (19)	Qatar (21)

== Venue ==
All matches
Linyi, China
Linyi Olympic Sports Park Stadium
Capacity: 20,410

== Knockout stage ==
- All times are China Standard Time (UTC+08:00).

Quarterfinals
4 July
China	3
Mexico	0
5 July
Egypt	3
Qatar	2
5 July
Ukraine	3
Chile	1
4 July
Belgium	3
Croatia	2

Semifinals
6 July
China	3
Egypt	0
6 July
Ukraine	2
Belgium	3

Final
7 July
China	3
Belgium	1
3rd place match
7 July
Egypt	3
Ukraine	2

=== Quarterfinals ===
Date	Time		Score		Set 1	Set 2	Set 3	Set 4	Set 5	Total	Report
4 Jul	15:30	China	3–0	Mexico	25–23	25–17	25–23			75–63	P2 Report
4 Jul	19:30	Belgium	3–2	Croatia	25–20	25–18	22–25	15–25	15–13	102–101	P2 Report
5 Jul	15:30	Ukraine	3–1	Chile	20–25	25–23	25–19	25–19		95–86	P2 Report
5 Jul	19:30	Egypt	3–2	Qatar	25–16	23–25	27–25	20–25	15–13	110–104	P2 Report

=== Semifinals ===
Date	Time		Score		Set 1	Set 2	Set 3	Set 4	Set 5	Total	Report
6 Jul	16:00	China	3–0	Egypt	25–15	27–25	25–19			77–59	P2 Report
6 Jul	20:00	Ukraine	2–3	Belgium	25–21	25–20	15–25	21–25	11–15	97–106	P2 Report

=== 3rd place match ===
Date	Time		Score		Set 1	Set 2	Set 3	Set 4	Set 5	Total	Report
7 Jul	13:30	Egypt	3–2	Ukraine	21–25	25–20	20–25	25–17	15–13	106–100	P2 Report

=== Final ===
Date	Time		Score		Set 1	Set 2	Set 3	Set 4	Set 5	Total	Report
7 Jul	17:00	China	3–1	Belgium	25–20	25–20	22–25	25–22		97–87	P2 Report

== Final standing ==
Rank	Team
1st place, gold medalist(s)	China
2nd place, silver medalist(s)	Belgium
3rd place, bronze medalist(s)	Egypt
4	Ukraine
5	Croatia
6	Qatar
7	Chile
8	Mexico

Qualified for the 2025 Nations League
Qualified for the 2025 Nations League via FIVB World Ranking

Source: VCC 2024 final standings

2024 Men's Challenger Cup champions

China
1st title

14–man Roster
Jiang Chuan (c), Wang Hebin, Li Lei, Yu Yuantai, Wang Dongchen, Li Yongzhen, Yang Tianyuan, Zhai Dejun, Peng Shikun, Qu Zongshuai, Wang Jingyi, Rao Shuhan, Zhang Jingyin, Mao Tianyi
Head coach
Vital Heynen

== See also ==
- 2024 FIVB Women's Volleyball Challenger Cup
- 2024 FIVB Men's Volleyball Nations League
