= FIVB Men's Volleyball Challenger Cup =

International men's volleyball competition for national teams

- Most recent season or competition: 2024 FIVB Men's Volleyball Challenger Cup
- Sport: Volleyball
- Founded: 2017; 9 years ago
- First season: 2018
- Folded: 2024
- CEO: (Brazil) Ary Graça
- No. of teams: 8
- Continent: International (FIVB)
- Last champions: China (1st title)
- Most titles: China; Cuba; Portugal; Slovenia; Turkey (1 title each)
- Streaming partner: Volleyball TV
- Promotion to: Nations League
- Website: Volleyball Challenger Cup

The FIVB Men's Volleyball Challenger Cup was an international volleyball competition contested by the senior men's national teams of the members of the Fédération Internationale de Volleyball (FIVB), the sport's global governing body. The Challenger Cup served as a qualifying tournament for the Volleyball Nations League (VNL), with the winner earning the right to participate in the following year's VNL.

A corresponding tournament for women's national teams was the FIVB Women's Volleyball Challenger Cup.

== History ==
The Challenger Cup was first announced in October 2017 (alongside the announcement of the Nations League) as a joint project between the FIVB, the IMG and 21 national federations. The inaugural tournament was played between 20 and 24 June 2018 in Matosinhos, Portugal. The Portugal team won the tournament, defeating Czech Republic counterpart in the final and qualified for the 2019 Nations League.

The 2020 and 2021 editions of the Challenger Cup were canceled due to the COVID-19 pandemic. When the tournament returned in 2022, it had a new knockout formula and the number of participating teams had increased from six to eight.

In 2024, FIVB announced that the world ranking would replace the Challenger Cup as the qualifier for the 2026 Nations League and the tournament was discontinued.

== Format ==
=== 2018–2019 ===
The six qualified teams play in 2 pools of 3 teams in a round-robin format. The top 2 teams of each pool qualify for the semifinals. The first ranked teams play against the second ranked teams in this round. The winners of the semifinals advance to compete for the Challenger Cup title. The champion team will qualify for the next year's Nations League as a challenger team.

=== 2022–2024 ===
The eight qualified teams play in a knockout stage format. The top four teams in the quarterfinals will qualify for the semifinals. The winner of the quarterfinal 1 will play a semifinal match against the winner of the quarterfinal 4 and the winner of the quarterfinal 2 will play a semifinal match against the winner of the quarterfinal 3. The winners of the semifinals will advance to compete for the Challenger Cup title. The champion team will qualify for the next year's Nations league as a challenger team.

== Qualification ==
Confederation	Slots
AVC (Asia)	1
CAVB (Africa)	1
CSV (South America)	1
CEV (Europe)	2
NORCECA (North America)	1
Total	8 (6+H+VNL)

== Hosts ==
List of hosts by number of final cups hosted.

Times hosted	Hosts	Year(s)
1	Portugal	2018
1	Slovenia	2019
1	South Korea	2022
1	Qatar	2023
1	China	2024

== Appearance ==
Legend

- 1st – Champions
- 2nd – Runners-up
- 3rd – Third place
- 4th – Fourth place
- • – Did not enter / Did not qualify
- – Hosts
- Q – Qualified for forthcoming tournament

Team	(Portugal); 2018 (6)	(Slovenia); 2019 (6)	(South Korea); 2022 (8)	(Qatar); 2023 (8)	(China); 2024 (8)	Total
Australia	•	•	5th	•	•	1
Belarus	•	3rd	•	•	•	1
Belgium	•	•	•	•	2nd	1
Chile	5th	6th	8th	4th	7th	5
China	•	•	•	5th	1st	2
Croatia	•	•	•	•	5th	1
Cuba	4th	2nd	1st	•	•	3
Czech Republic	2nd	•	4th	•	•	2
Dominican Republic	•	•	•	6th	•	1
Egypt	•	5th	•	•	3rd	2
Estonia	3rd	•	•	•	•	1
Kazakhstan	5th	•	•	•	•	1
Mexico	•	•	•	•	8th	1
Portugal	1st	•	•	•	•	1
Qatar	•	•	7th	2nd	6th	3
Slovenia	•	1st	•	•	•	1
South Korea	•	•	3rd	•	•	1
Thailand	•	•	•	7th	•	1
Tunisia	•	•	6th	8th	•	2
Turkey	•	4th	2nd	1st	•	3
Ukraine	•	•	•	3rd	4th	2

== Results summary ==
Year	Host	Final			3rd place match			Teams
Year	Host	Champions	Score	Runners-up	3rd place	Score	4th place	Teams
2018; Details	(Portugal); Matosinhos	Portugal	3–1	Czech Republic	Estonia	3–0	Cuba	6
2019; Details	(Slovenia); Ljubljana	Slovenia	3–0	Cuba	Belarus	3–1	Turkey	6
2020	(Portugal); Gondomar	Canceled due to COVID-19 pandemic						
2021	(Portugal); Gondomar	Canceled due to COVID-19 pandemic						
2022; Details	(South Korea); Seoul	Cuba	3–1	Turkey	South Korea	3–2	Czech Republic	8
2023; Details	(Qatar); Doha	Turkey	3–2	Qatar	Ukraine	3–0	Chile	8
2024; Details	(China); Linyi	China	3–1	Belgium	Egypt	3–2	Ukraine	8

== Medals summary ==
Rank	Nation	Gold	Silver	Bronze	Total
1	Cuba	1	1	0	2
1	Turkey	1	1	0	2
3	China	1	0	0	1
3	Portugal	1	0	0	1
3	Slovenia	1	0	0	1
6	Belgium	0	1	0	1
6	Czech Republic	0	1	0	1
6	Qatar	0	1	0	1
9	Belarus	0	0	1	1
9	Egypt	0	0	1	1
9	Estonia	0	0	1	1
9	South Korea	0	0	1	1
9	Ukraine	0	0	1	1
Totals (13 entries)		5	5	5	15

== Nations League qualifier ==
Year	Relegated Challenger Team	Remaining Challenger Teams					Challenger Cup Winner
2018	South Korea ▼	Australia	Bulgaria	Canada	Only 4 challenger teams in the tournament		Portugal ▲
2019	Portugal ▼	Australia	Bulgaria	Canada	Only 4 challenger teams in the tournament		Slovenia ▲
2021	None	Australia	Bulgaria	Canada	Netherlands (Note: Netherlands replaced China after the decision of the Chinese Volleyball Association to withdraw its national men's team due to financial limitations and travel restrictions caused by the COVID-19 pandemic.)	Slovenia	Cancelled
2022	Australia ▼	China (Note: China replaced Russia due to its invasion of Ukraine. As a result, Russia was out of the Nations League.)	Bulgaria	Canada	Netherlands	Slovenia	Cuba ▲
2023	China ▼	Cuba	Bulgaria	Canada	Netherlands	Slovenia	Turkey ▲
2024	None						China ▲

== See also ==
- FIVB Men's Volleyball Nations League
- FIVB Women's Volleyball Challenger Cup
- FIVB Women's Volleyball Nations League
