= 2013 Men's NORCECA Volleyball Championship =

Volleyball Championship

2013 Men's NORCECA Championship

Tournament details
- Host country: Canada
- City: Langley
- Dates: 23–28 September 2013
- Teams: 9
- Venue: 1 (in 1 host city)

Final positions
- Champions: United States (8th title)
- Runners-up: Canada
- Third place: Cuba
- Fourth place: Puerto Rico

Tournament awards
- MVP: (United States) Matt Anderson
- Best Setter: (United States) Micah Christenson
- Best OH: (United States) Matt Anderson (United States) William Priddy
- Best MB: (Canada) Rudy Verhoeff (The Bahamas) Byron Ferguson
- Best OPP: (Mexico) Daniel Vargas
- Best Libero: (Puerto Rico) Dennis Del Valle

Tournament statistics
- Matches played: 18
- Attendance: 15,685 (871 per match)
- Best scorer: (Cuba) Rolando Cepeda (81 points)
- Best spiker: (Guatemala) Andy Leonardo (53.66 %)
- Best blocker: (Canada) Rudy Verhoeff (1.50 Avg)
- Best server: (United States) Micah Christenson (0.54 Avg)
- Best setter: (United States) Micah Christenson (5.46 Avg)
- Best digger: (Puerto Rico) Dennis Del Valle (2.37 Avg)
- Best receiver: (Canada) Blair Bann (82.98%)

The 2013 Men's NORCECA Volleyball Championship was the 23rd edition of the tournament, played from 23 to 28 September 2013 at The Langley Events Centre in Langley, Canada. The event served as qualifier for the 2013 FIVB Men's World Grand Champions Cup.

== Pools composition ==
Pool A	Pool B	Pool C
Dominican Republic	Bahamas	Canada
United States	Cuba	Guatemala
Saint Lucia	Puerto Rico	Mexico

== Pool standing procedure ==
1. Number of matches won
2. Match points
3. Points ratio
4. Sets ratio
5. Result of the last match between the tied teams

Match won 3–0: 5 match points for the winner, 0 match points for the loser
Match won 3–1: 4 match points for the winner, 1 match point for the loser
Match won 3–2: 3 match points for the winner, 2 match points for the loser

== Preliminary round ==
- All times are Pacific Daylight Time (UTC−07:00).

=== Pool A ===
Pos	Team	Pld	W	L	Pts	SPW	SPL	SPR	SW	SL	SR	Qualification
1	United States	2	2	0	10	150	78	1.923	6	0	MAX	Semifinals
2	Dominican Republic	2	1	1	5	120	129	0.930	3	3	1.000	Quarterfinals
3	Saint Lucia	2	0	2	0	87	150	0.580	0	6	0.000	7th-place match

Date	Time		Score		Set 1	Set 2	Set 3	Set 4	Set 5	Total	Report
23 Sep	16:00	United States	3–0	Saint Lucia	25–12	25–10	25–11			75–33	P2 P3
24 Sep	20:36	United States	3–0	Dominican Republic	25–19	25–17	25–9			75–45	P2 P3
25 Sep	18:00	Dominican Republic	3–0	Saint Lucia	25–19	25–12	25–23			75–54	P2 P3

=== Pool B ===
Pos	Team	Pld	W	L	Pts	SPW	SPL	SPR	SW	SL	SR	Qualification
1	Cuba	2	2	0	9	172	121	1.421	6	1	6.000	Quarterfinals
2	Puerto Rico	2	1	1	6	161	144	1.118	4	3	1.333	Quarterfinals
3	Bahamas	2	0	2	0	82	150	0.547	0	6	0.000	9th-place match

Date	Time		Score		Set 1	Set 2	Set 3	Set 4	Set 5	Total	Report
23 Sep	18:00	Cuba	3–0	Bahamas	25–16	25–12	25–7			75–35	P2 P3
24 Sep	18:00	Cuba	3–1	Puerto Rico	25–17	22–25	25–22	25–22		97–86	P2 P3
25 Sep	16:00	Puerto Rico	3–0	Bahamas	25–10	25–17	25–20			75–47	P2 P3

=== Pool C ===
Pos	Team	Pld	W	L	Pts	SPW	SPL	SPR	SW	SL	SR	Qualification
1	Canada	2	2	0	10	150	79	1.899	6	0	MAX	Semifinals
2	Mexico	2	1	1	5	124	130	0.954	3	3	1.000	Quarterfinals
3	Guatemala	2	0	2	0	85	150	0.567	0	6	0.000	9th-place match

Date	Time		Score		Set 1	Set 2	Set 3	Set 4	Set 5	Total	Report
23 Sep	20:17	Canada	3–0	Guatemala	25–10	25–10	25–10			75–30	P2 P3
24 Sep	16:00	Mexico	3–0	Guatemala	25–18	25–14	25–23			75–55	P2 P3
25 Sep	20:00	Canada	3–0	Mexico	25–22	25–15	25–12			75–49	P2 P3

== Final round ==
- All times are Pacific Daylight Time (UTC−07:00).

=== 7th–9th places ===
9th place match
–	–
–	–
26 September
Guatemala	0
Bahamas	3

7th place match
27 September
Saint Lucia	0
Bahamas	3

==== 9th place match ====
Date	Time		Score		Set 1	Set 2	Set 3	Set 4	Set 5	Total	Report
26 Sep	16:00	Guatemala	0–3	Bahamas	18–25	21–25	23–25			62–75	P2 P3

==== 7th place match ====
Date	Time		Score		Set 1	Set 2	Set 3	Set 4	Set 5	Total	Report
27 Sep	16:00	Saint Lucia	0–3	Bahamas	17–25	20–25	20–25			57–75	P2 P3

=== Championship ===
First round
26 September
Puerto Rico	3
Mexico	0
26 September
Cuba	3
Dominican Republic	2

Semifinals
27 September
United States	3
Puerto Rico	1
27 September
Canada	3
Cuba	0
Fifth place
28 September
Mexico	3
Dominican Republic	0

Final
28 September
United States	3
Canada	0
Third place
28 September
Puerto Rico	2
Cuba	3

==== Quarterfinals ====
Date	Time		Score		Set 1	Set 2	Set 3	Set 4	Set 5	Total	Report
26 Sep	18:00	Puerto Rico	3–0	Mexico	25–17	25–17	25–22			75–56	P2 P3
26 Sep	20:00	Cuba	3–2	Dominican Republic	25–21	21–25	23–25	25–16	15–12	109–99	P2 P3

==== Semifinals ====
Date	Time		Score		Set 1	Set 2	Set 3	Set 4	Set 5	Total	Report
27 Sep	18:00	United States	3–1	Puerto Rico	25–13	24–26	25–20	25–16		99–75	P2 P3
27 Sep	20:30	Canada	3–0	Cuba	25–14	25–17	25–21			75–52	P2 P3

==== 5th place match ====
Date	Time		Score		Set 1	Set 2	Set 3	Set 4	Set 5	Total	Report
28 Sep	16:00	Mexico	3–0	Dominican Republic	25–23	25–22	26–24			76–69	P2 P3

==== 3rd place match ====
Date	Time		Score		Set 1	Set 2	Set 3	Set 4	Set 5	Total	Report
28 Sep	18:00	Puerto Rico	2–3	Cuba	29–27	27–25	20–25	25–27	12–15	113–119	P2 P3

==== Final ====
Date	Time		Score		Set 1	Set 2	Set 3	Set 4	Set 5	Total	Report
28 Sep	20:58	United States	3–0	Canada	25–23	25–20	25–14			75–57	P2 P3

== Final standing ==
Rank	Team
1st place, gold medalist(s)	United States
2nd place, silver medalist(s)	Canada
3rd place, bronze medalist(s)	Cuba
4	Puerto Rico
5	Mexico
6	Dominican Republic
7	Bahamas
8	Saint Lucia
9	Guatemala

Qualified for the 2013 World Grand Champions Cup

2013 Men's NORCECA champions

United States
8th title

== Awards ==
=== Best players ===
- Most valuable player
  (United States) Matthew Anderson
- Best scorer
  (Cuba) Rolando Cepeda
- Best spiker
  (Guatemala) Andy Leonardo
- Best blocker
  (Canada) Rudy Verhoeff
- Best server
  (United States) Micah Christenson
- Best digger
  (Puerto Rico) Dennis del Valle
- Best setter
  (United States) Micah Christenson
- Best receiver
  (Canada) Blair Bann
- Best libero
  (Puerto Rico) Dennis Del Valle
- Jim Coleman Award
  (United States) John Speraw

=== All–star team ===
- Best setter
  (United States) Micah Christenson
- Best outside spikers
  (United States) Matthew Anderson
  (United States) William Priddy
- Best middle blockers
  (Canada) Rudy Verhoeff
  (The Bahamas) Byron Ferguson
- Best opposite spiker
  (Mexico) Daniel Vargas
- Best libero
  (Puerto Rico) Dennis Del Valle

== See also ==
- 2013 Women's NORCECA Volleyball Championship
