= Rudy Verhoeff =

Canadian volleyball player (born 1989)

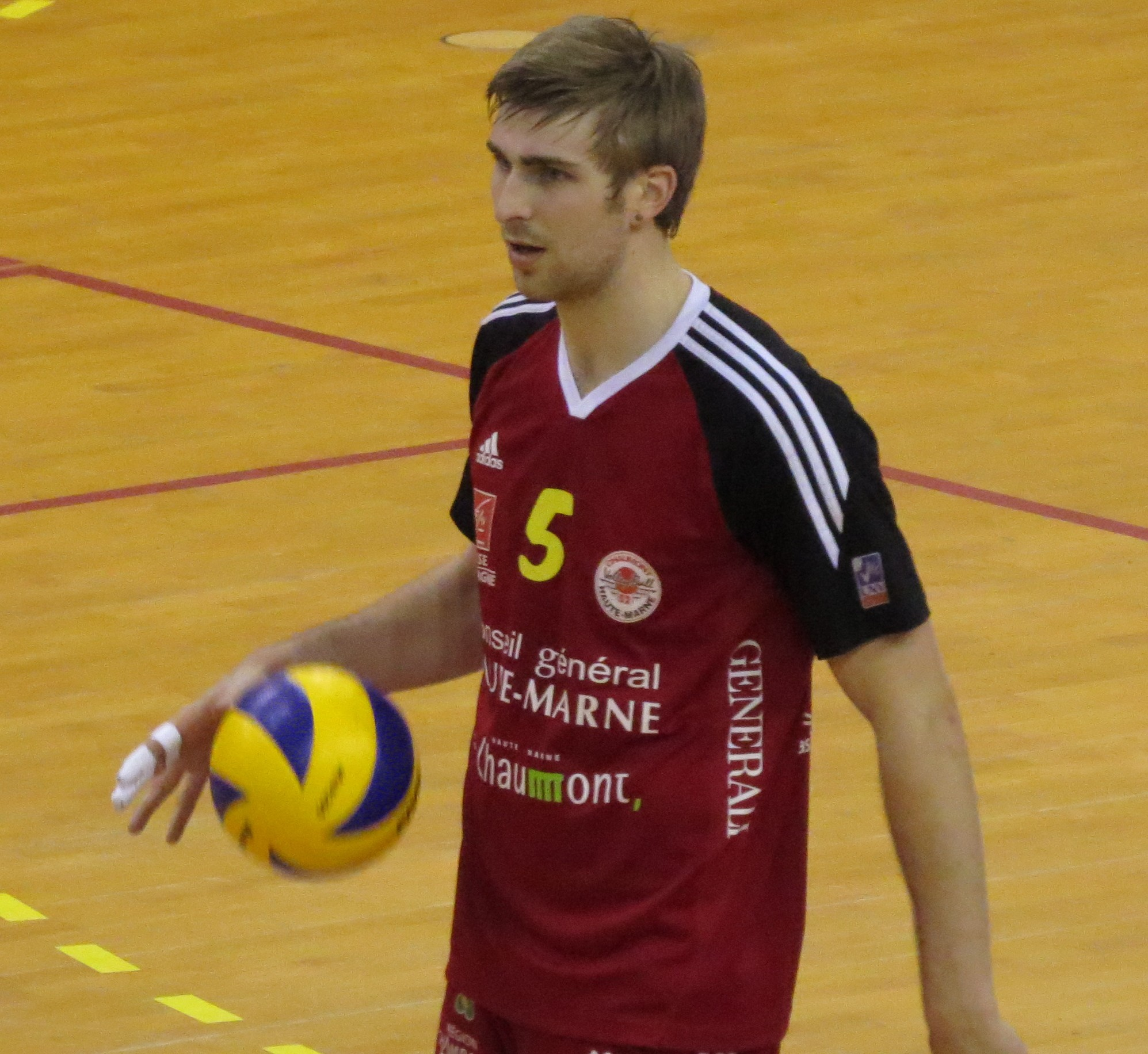

Personal information
- Nationality: Canadian
- Born: 24 June 1989 (age 37); Calgary, Alberta
- Hometown: Calgary, Alberta
- Height: 2.00 m (6 ft 7 in)
- Weight: 88 kg (194 lb)
- Spike: 349 cm (137 in)
- Block: 317 cm (125 in)
- Education: Trinity Western University

Volleyball information
- Position: Opposite
- Current club: Düren
- Number: 5

Career
Years	Teams
2007–2012; 2013–2014; 2014–2015; 2015–2017; 2017–2018; 2018–2020; 2020–2021	Trinity Western Spartans; Chaumont VB 52; GFCO Ajaccio; Düren; HYPO TIROL AlpenVolleys; Chennai Spartans; Le Plessis-Robinson

National team
2008–2009; 2013–2017	Canada U21; Canada
Honours
Men's volleyball
Representing Canada
Men's Volleyball
FIVB World League
Bronze medal – third place	2017 Curitiba
NORCECA Championship
Gold medal – first place	2015 Mexico
Silver medal – second place	2013 Canada
Pan American Games
Bronze medal – third place	2015 Toronto

Rudy Verhoeff (born 24 June 1989) is a retired Canadian male volleyball player. He was a member of the Canada men's national volleyball team, a participant in the 2016 Summer Olympics, a gold and silver medalist at the NORCECA Men's Volleyball Championship in 2015 and 2013, and a bronze medalist at the 2015 Pan American Games.

== Personal life ==
Rudy Verhoeff was born in Calgary, Alberta to Paul and Cobi Verhoeff. He has three older siblings; Lance, Anya, and Lies, and he began playing volleyball at the age of 14. He is married to Kyla Richey.

== Playing career ==
=== Club ===
Rudy was a member of the Trinity Western Spartans from 2007 to 2012. During his time there, he helped the team win back to back CIS Volleyball Championships in 2010/2011 and 2011/2012 season, while being named tournament MVP in 2011 and winning the Dale Iwanoczko Award for outstanding student athlete in 2012. Following the conclusion of his university volleyball career, Rudy spent a season with the Team Canada Full Time Training Center. He signed his first professional contract with French club Chaumont VB 52, helping the team to a 5th-place finish in the French League. The following season he signed with a different French side, GFCO Ajaccio. In 2015, Rudy signed with German team Düren. There, he was teamed up with fellow national team players Blair Bann and Jay Blankenau.

=== National team ===
Rudy first joined the national team program in 2008 with the Canada men's junior national volleyball team. He helped the team win silver in the 2008 Junior NORCECA Championship, and qualify for the 2009 FIVB Volleyball Men's U21 World Championship.

He joined the senior national team in 2013. Rudy has helped the team win silver and gold at the Men's NORCECA Volleyball Championship in 2013 and 2015, respectively, as well as a bronze medal at the 2015 Pan American Games. In 2016, he helped the team finish 5th at the 2016 Summer Olympics.

Pro Volleyball

He played Pro Volleyball League in India in February 2019 for Chennai Spartans. He was the top scorer of the tournament.

== Sporting achievements ==
=== Club ===
- 2009/2010 CIS Men's Volleyball Championship, with Trinity Western Spartans
- 2010/2011 CIS Men's Volleyball Championship, with Trinity Western Spartans
- 2011/2012 CIS Men's Volleyball Championship, with Trinity Western Spartans
- 2019 Pro Volleyball League, with Chennai Spartans

=== National team ===
- 2008 Junior NORCECA Championship
- 2013 NORCECA Championship
- 2015 NORCECA Championship
- 2015 Pan American Games

=== Individual ===
- 2010/2011 CIS Men's Volleyball Championship – MVP
- 2013 NORCECA Championship – Best Middle Blocker
- 2013 NORCECA Championship – Best Blocker
