= 2018 FIVB Men's Volleyball Nations League =

Tournament details
- Host country: France
- City: Lille (final round)
- Dates: 25 May – 8 July
- Teams: 16 (from 4 confederations)
- Venue: 22 (in 22 host cities)

Final positions
- Champions: Russia (1st title)
- Runners-up: France
- Third place: United States
- Fourth place: Brazil
- Relegated: South Korea

Tournament awards
- MVP: (Russia) Maxim Mikhaylov
- Best Setter: (France) Benjamin Toniutti
- Best OH: (United States) Taylor Sander; (Russia) Dmitry Volkov
- Best MB: (France) Kévin Le Roux; (Russia) Dmitry Muserskiy
- Best OPP: (United States) Matt Anderson
- Best Libero: (France) Jenia Grebennikov

Tournament statistics
- Matches played: 130
- Attendance: 494,775 (3,806 per match)

The 2018 FIVB Men's Volleyball Nations League was the inaugural edition of the FIVB Men's Volleyball Nations League, a new annual international men's volleyball tournament contested by 16 national teams that replaced the former World League in the international calendar. The competition was held between May and July 2018, and the final round took place in the Stade Pierre-Mauroy, Villeneuve-d'Ascq, Lille metropolitan area, France.

South Korea were the last placed challenger team after the preliminary round and were replaced by 2018 Challenger Cup winners Portugal in the 2019 edition.

Russia won the inaugural edition, defeating the home team in straight sets in the final. Both teams contesting the final had previously won the World League – Russia on three opportunities and France on two. United States, which also had won the World League twice, defeated the reigning Olympic champions and 9-time World League winners Brazil in straight sets for the bronze medal. Maxim Mikhaylov from Russia, who was the World League MVP in 2011, was elected the Most valuable player.

== Teams ==
=== Qualification ===
Sixteen teams qualified for the competition. Twelve of them qualified as core teams which cannot face relegation. Other four teams were selected as challenger teams which could be relegated from the tournament.

Country	Confederation	Designation	Previous appearances			Previous best performance
Country	Confederation	Designation	Total	First	Last	Previous best performance
Argentina	CSV	Core team	0	None		Debut
Australia	AVC	Challenger team	0	None		Debut
Brazil	CSV	Core team	0	None		Debut
Bulgaria	CEV	Challenger team	0	None		Debut
Canada	NORCECA	Challenger team	0	None		Debut
China	AVC	Core team	0	None		Debut
France	CEV	Core team	0	None		Debut
Germany	CEV	Core team	0	None		Debut
Iran	AVC	Core team	0	None		Debut
Italy	CEV	Core team	0	None		Debut
Japan	AVC	Core team	0	None		Debut
Poland	CEV	Core team	0	None		Debut
Russia	CEV	Core team	0	None		Debut
Serbia	CEV	Core team	0	None		Debut
South Korea	AVC	Challenger team	0	None		Debut
United States	NORCECA	Core team	0	None		Debut

== Format ==
=== Preliminary round ===
The 16 teams compete in a round-robin format with every core team hosting a pool at least once. The teams are divided into 4 pools of 4 teams at each week and compete five weeks long, for 120 matches. The top five teams after the preliminary round join the hosts of the final round to compete in the final round. The relegation takes into consideration only the 4 challenger teams. The last ranked challenger team will be excluded from the 2019 Nations League. The winners of the 2018 Challenger Cup will qualify for the next edition as a challenger team.

=== Final round ===
The six qualified teams play in 2 pools of 3 teams in round-robin. The top 2 teams of each pool qualify for the semifinals. The pool winners play against the runners-up in this round. The semifinals winners advance to compete for the Nations League title. The losers face each other in the third place match.

== Pools composition ==
The overview of pools was released on February 16, 2018.

=== Preliminary round ===
Week 1
Pool 1 France	Pool 2 China	Pool 3 Poland	Pool 4 Serbia
Australia; France; Iran; Japan	Argentina; Bulgaria; China; United States	Canada; Poland; Russia; South Korea	Brazil; Germany; Italy; Serbia
Week 2
Pool 5 Bulgaria	Pool 6 Brazil	Pool 7 Argentina	Pool 8 Poland
Australia; Bulgaria; Russia; Serbia	Brazil; Japan; South Korea; United States	Argentina; Canada; Iran; Italy	China; France; Germany; Poland
Week 3
Pool 9 Canada	Pool 10 Japan	Pool 11 Russia	Pool 12 France
Australia; Canada; Germany; United States	Bulgaria; Italy; Japan; Poland	Brazil; China; Iran; Russia	Argentina; France; Serbia; South Korea
Week 4
Pool 13 South Korea	Pool 14 Germany	Pool 15 United States	Pool 16 Bulgaria
Australia; China; Italy; South Korea	Argentina; Germany; Japan; Russia	Iran; Poland; Serbia; United States	Brazil; Bulgaria; Canada; France
Week 5
Pool 17 Australia	Pool 18 China	Pool 19 Iran	Pool 20 Italy
Argentina; Australia; Brazil; Poland	Canada; China; Japan; Serbia	Bulgaria; Germany; Iran; South Korea	France; Italy; Russia; United States

=== Final round ===
Pool A	Pool B
France (Hosts); Serbia (Preliminary Round 3rd); Brazil (Preliminary Round 4th)	Russia (Preliminary Round 1st); United States (Preliminary Round 2nd); Poland (Preliminary Round 5th)

== Venues ==
The list of host cities and venues was announced on 16 February 2018.

=== Preliminary round ===
Week 1
Pool 1	Pool 2	Pool 3	Pool 4
Rouen, France	Ningbo, China	Katowice (25 May) / Kraków (26–27 May), Poland	Kraljevo, Serbia
Kindarena	Beilun Gymnasium	Spodek / Tauron Arena Kraków	Kraljevo Sports Hall
Capacity: 5,700	Capacity: 8,000	Capacity: 11,500 / 15,000	Capacity: 3,331
Week 2
Pool 5	Pool 6	Pool 7	Pool 8
Sofia, Bulgaria	Goiânia, Brazil	San Juan, Argentina	Łódź, Poland
Armeets Arena	Goiânia Arena	Estadio Aldo Cantoni	Atlas Arena
Capacity: 12,373	Capacity: 11,333	Capacity: 8,000	Capacity: 13,805
Week 3
Pool 9	Pool 10	Pool 11	Pool 12
Ottawa, Canada	Osaka, Japan	Ufa, Russia	Aix-en-Provence, France
TD Place Arena	Osaka Municipal Central Gymnasium	Ufa Arena	Aréna du Pays d'Aix
Capacity: 9,500	Capacity: 10,000	Capacity: 8,250	Capacity: 6,004
Week 4
Pool 13	Pool 14	Pool 15	Pool 16
Seoul, South Korea	Ludwigsburg, Germany	Hoffman Estates, United States	Varna, Bulgaria
Jangchung Arena	Arena Ludwigsburg	Sears Centre Arena	Palace of Culture and Sports
Capacity: 4,507	Capacity: 5,325	Capacity: 10,000	Capacity: 6,000
Week 5
Pool 17	Pool 18	Pool 19	Pool 20
Melbourne, Australia	Jiangmen, China	Tehran, Iran	Modena, Italy
Hisense Arena	Jiangmen Sports Center Gymnasium	Azadi Indoor Stadium	PalaPanini
Capacity: 10,500	Capacity: 8,500	Capacity: 12,000	Capacity: 4,968

=== Final round ===
All matches
Villeneuve-d'Ascq, France
Stade Pierre-Mauroy
Capacity: 28,010
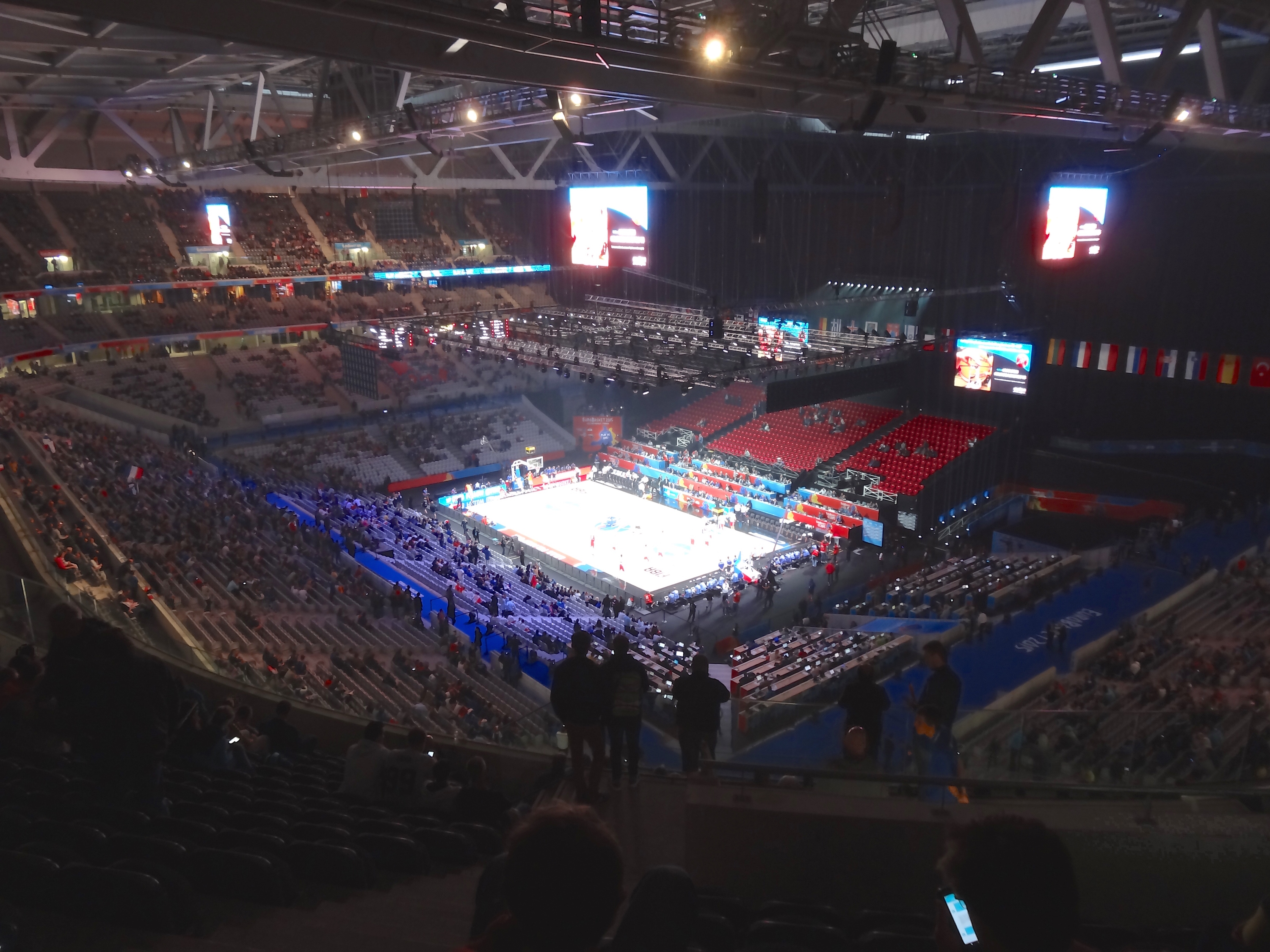

== Competition schedule ==
●	Preliminary round	●	Final round

Week 1 25–27 May	Week 2 1–3 Jun	Week 3 8–10 Jun	Week 4 15–17 Jun	Week 5 22–24 Jun	Week 6 Rest Week	Week 7 4–8 Jul
24 matches	24 matches	24 matches	24 matches	24 matches		10 matches

== Pool standing procedure ==
1. Total number of victories (matches won, matches lost)
2. In the event of a tie, the following first tiebreaker will apply: The teams will be ranked by the most points gained per match as follows:
  - Match won 3–0 or 3–1: 3 points for the winner, 0 points for the loser
  - Match won 3–2: 2 points for the winner, 1 point for the loser
  - Match forfeited: 3 points for the winner, 0 points (0–25, 0–25, 0–25) for the loser
3. If teams are still tied after examining the number of victories and points gained, then the FIVB will examine the results in order to break the tie in the following order:
  - Sets quotient: if two or more teams are tied on the number of points gained, they will be ranked by the quotient resulting from the division of the number of all sets won by the number of all sets lost.
  - Points quotient: if the tie persists based on the sets quotient, the teams will be ranked by the quotient resulting from the division of all points scored by the total of points lost during all sets.
  - If the tie persists based on the points quotient, the tie will be broken based on the team that won the match of the Round Robin Phase between the tied teams. When the tie in points quotient is between three or more teams, these teams ranked taking into consideration only the matches involving the teams in question.

== Preliminary round ==
=== Ranking ===
Pos	Team	Pld	W	L	Pts	SW	SL	SR	SPW	SPL	SPR	Qualification or relegation
1	France (Note: Qualified as hosts)	15	12	3	35	38	16	2.375	1295	1140	1.136	Final round
2	Russia	15	11	4	34	36	14	2.571	1191	1096	1.087	Final round
3	United States	15	11	4	33	37	19	1.947	1294	1183	1.094	Final round
4	Serbia	15	11	4	29	33	24	1.375	1289	1255	1.027	Final round
5	Brazil	15	10	5	30	34	21	1.619	1280	1213	1.055	Final round
6	Poland	15	10	5	29	32	19	1.684	1221	1124	1.086	Final round
7	Canada	15	8	7	25	29	24	1.208	1219	1227	0.993	
8	Italy	15	8	7	24	30	28	1.071	1315	1296	1.015	
9	Germany	15	7	8	23	29	30	0.967	1299	1307	0.994	
10	Iran	15	7	8	21	29	30	0.967	1355	1344	1.008	
11	Bulgaria	15	6	9	17	26	34	0.765	1288	1351	0.953	
12	Japan	15	6	9	15	23	37	0.622	1301	1374	0.947	
13	Australia	15	5	10	15	21	35	0.600	1236	1340	0.922	
14	Argentina	15	4	11	15	23	34	0.676	1270	1326	0.958	
15	China	15	3	12	9	15	39	0.385	1173	1291	0.909	
16	South Korea	15	1	14	6	11	42	0.262	1108	1267	0.875	Excluded from 2019 Nations League

Source: VNL 2018 standings

=== Week 1 ===
==== Pool 1 ====
- All times are Central European Summer Time (UTC+02:00).

Date	Time		Score		Set 1	Set 2	Set 3	Set 4	Set 5	Total	Report
25 May	17:00	Australia	1–3	Japan	18–25	15–25	25–23	17–25		75–98	P2 Report
25 May	20:00	France	3–1	Iran	25–20	24–26	25–20	25–17		99–83	P2 Report
26 May	17:00	Australia	0–3	Iran	23–25	23–25	21–25			67–75	P2 Report
26 May	20:00	France	3–1	Japan	25–16	20–25	25–20	25–22		95–83	P2 Report
27 May	15:00	Iran	1–3	Japan	22–25	28–30	25–23	23–25		98–103	P2 Report
27 May	18:00	France	3–0	Australia	25–17	25–20	36–34			86–71	P2 Report

==== Pool 2 ====
- All times are China Standard Time (UTC+08:00).

Date	Time		Score		Set 1	Set 2	Set 3	Set 4	Set 5	Total	Report
25 May	16:00	Argentina	2–3	United States	27–25	26–24	24–26	21–25	10–15	108–115	P2 Report
25 May	19:30	China	2–3	Bulgaria	18–25	25–18	25–19	17–25	11–15	96–102	P2 Report
26 May	16:00	Bulgaria	1–3	United States	19–25	25–22	19–25	20–25		83–97	P2 Report
26 May	19:30	China	3–0	Argentina	25–22	25–21	25–18			75–61	P2 Report
27 May	16:00	Bulgaria	3–1	Argentina	19–25	25–19	25–21	25–22		94–87	P2 Report
27 May	19:30	China	0–3	United States	20–25	24–26	18–25			62–76	P2 Report

==== Pool 3 ====
- All times are Central European Summer Time (UTC+02:00).

Date	Time		Score		Set 1	Set 2	Set 3	Set 4	Set 5	Total	Report
25 May	16:00	Poland	3–0	South Korea	25–20	25–18	25–21			75–59	P2 Report
25 May	19:00	Russia	3–0	Canada	26–24	25–14	25–19			76–57	P2 Report
26 May	16:00	Poland	3–0	Russia	25–15	25–23	25–23			75–61	P2 Report
26 May	19:00	Canada	3–0	South Korea	25–20	25–17	25–19			75–56	P2 Report
27 May	16:00	Poland	3–1	Canada	25–21	26–24	21–25	25–17		97–87	P2 Report
27 May	19:00	South Korea	0–3	Russia	26–28	21–25	15–25			62–78	P2 Report

==== Pool 4 ====
- All times are Central European Summer Time (UTC+02:00).

Date	Time		Score		Set 1	Set 2	Set 3	Set 4	Set 5	Total	Report
25 May	17:00	Germany	1–3	Italy	18–25	19–25	25–23	20–25		82–98	P2 Report
25 May	20:00	Serbia	0–3	Brazil	22–25	22–25	24–26			68–76	P2 Report
26 May	16:00	Italy	3–2	Brazil	18–25	25–19	25–21	24–26	15–8	107–99	P2 Report
26 May	19:00	Germany	1–3	Serbia	25–19	21–25	16–25	14–25		76–94	P2 Report
27 May	16:00	Brazil	3–0	Germany	26–24	25–23	26–24			77–71	P2 Report
27 May	19:00	Italy	3–0	Serbia	25–21	25–18	25–16			75–55	P2 Report

=== Week 2 ===
==== Pool 5 ====
- All times are Eastern European Summer Time (UTC+03:00).

Date	Time		Score		Set 1	Set 2	Set 3	Set 4	Set 5	Total	Report
1 Jun	17:00	Australia	1–3	Russia	18–25	19–25	25–18	22–25		84–93	P2 Report
1 Jun	20:00	Bulgaria	2–3	Serbia	17–25	25–23	25–23	21–25	14–16	102–112	P2 Report
2 Jun	17:00	Russia	2–3	Serbia	25–20	23–25	23–25	25–22	12–15	108–107	P2 Report
2 Jun	20:05	Bulgaria	0–3	Australia	23–25	23–25	24–26			70–76	P2 Report
3 Jun	17:00	Serbia	3–2	Australia	25–23	25–19	20–25	25–27	15–9	110–103	P2 Report
3 Jun	20:00	Bulgaria	0–3	Russia	17–25	15–25	21–25			53–75	P2 Report

==== Pool 6 ====
- All times are Brasília Time (UTC−03:00).

Date	Time		Score		Set 1	Set 2	Set 3	Set 4	Set 5	Total	Report
1 Jun	12:15	Japan	2–3	United States	25–23	25–13	18–25	20–25	10–15	98–101	P2 Report
1 Jun	15:05	Brazil	3–0	South Korea	25–21	25–19	25–19			75–59	P2 Report
2 Jun	08:35	Brazil	3–0	Japan	26–24	25–19	25–20			76–63	P2 Report
2 Jun	11:20	South Korea	0–3	United States	23–25	21–25	11–25			55–75	P2 Report
3 Jun	10:05	South Korea	2–3	Japan	29–27	19–25	25–16	26–28	12–15	111–111	P2 Report
3 Jun	13:20	Brazil	3–2	United States	21–25	20–25	25–19	25–20	20–18	111–107	P2 Report

==== Pool 7 ====
- All times are Argentina Time (UTC−03:00).

Date	Time		Score		Set 1	Set 2	Set 3	Set 4	Set 5	Total	Report
1 Jun	18:10	Canada	3–1	Italy	22–25	27–25	25–23	25–16		99–89	P2 Report
1 Jun	21:10	Argentina	2–3	Iran	25–21	22–25	22–25	26–24	9–15	104–110	P2 Report
2 Jun	18:10	Iran	0–3	Italy	23–25	18–25	20–25			61–75	P2 Report
2 Jun	21:10	Argentina	1–3	Canada	22–25	18–25	26–24	23–25		89–99	P2 Report
3 Jun	16:10	Iran	1–3	Canada	23–25	22–25	25–21	21–25		91–96	P2 Report
3 Jun	19:10	Argentina	3–0	Italy	25–19	33–31	25–20			83–70	P2 Report

==== Pool 8 ====
- All times are Central European Summer Time (UTC+02:00).

Date	Time		Score		Set 1	Set 2	Set 3	Set 4	Set 5	Total	Report
1 Jun	16:00	Poland	3–0	France	25–19	25–20	25–22			75–61	P2 Report
1 Jun	19:00	China	1–3	Germany	25–23	18–25	22–25	21–25		86–98	P2 Report
2 Jun	16:00	Poland	3–0	China	25–19	25–18	25–21			75–58	P2 Report
2 Jun	19:00	Germany	0–3	France	21–25	18–25	23–25			62–75	P2 Report
3 Jun	16:00	Poland	1–3	Germany	18–25	21–25	25–21	25–27		89–98	P2 Report
3 Jun	19:00	France	2–3	China	25–16	22–25	21–25	25–16	13–15	106–97	P2 Report

=== Week 3 ===
==== Pool 9 ====
- All times are Eastern Daylight Time (UTC−04:00).

Date	Time		Score		Set 1	Set 2	Set 3	Set 4	Set 5	Total	Report
8 Jun	16:40	Germany	3–0	United States	25–19	25–22	25–13			75–54	P2 Report
8 Jun	19:40	Canada	3–0	Australia	25–19	26–24	25–19			76–62	P2 Report
9 Jun	16:10	United States	3–1	Australia	20–25	25–20	25–15	25–17		95–77	P2 Report
9 Jun	19:10	Canada	1–3	Germany	23–25	22–25	25–20	19–25		89–95	P2 Report
10 Jun	13:10	Australia	3–2	Germany	25–22	18–25	17–25	25–18	15–11	100–101	P2 Report
10 Jun	16:10	Canada	1–3	United States	25–23	13–25	19–25	20–25		77–98	P2 Report

==== Pool 10 ====
- All times are Japan Standard Time (UTC+09:00).

Date	Time		Score		Set 1	Set 2	Set 3	Set 4	Set 5	Total	Report
8 Jun	15:40	Italy	2–3	Poland	17–25	25–21	17–25	31–29	10–15	100–115	P2 Report
8 Jun	19:10	Japan	0–3	Bulgaria	14–25	21–25	27–29			62–79	P2 Report
9 Jun	12:40	Italy	3–1	Bulgaria	25–23	25–19	21–25	25–19		96–86	P2 Report
9 Jun	16:10	Japan	0–3	Poland	16–25	21–25	20–25			57–75	P2 Report
10 Jun	11:10	Bulgaria	1–3	Poland	21–25	26–24	18–25	19–25		84–99	P2 Report
10 Jun	14:40	Japan	3–2	Italy	21–25	25–21	23–25	25–22	15–10	109–103	P2 Report

==== Pool 11 ====
- All times are Yekaterinburg Time (UTC+05:00).

Date	Time		Score		Set 1	Set 2	Set 3	Set 4	Set 5	Total	Report
8 Jun	16:30	China	0–3	Iran	19–25	20–25	15–25			54–75	P2 Report
8 Jun	19:00	Russia	1–3	Brazil	21–25	20–25	27–25	18–25		86–100	P2 Report
9 Jun	16:30	Iran	2–3	Brazil	17–25	25–23	19–25	25–21	13–15	99–109	P2 Report
9 Jun	19:00	Russia	3–0	China	25–23	25–23	31–29			81–75	P2 Report
10 Jun	16:30	China	0–3	Brazil	20–25	19–25	25–27			64–77	P2 Report
10 Jun	19:00	Russia	3–1	Iran	28–30	25–23	27–25	25–21		105–99	P2 Report

==== Pool 12 ====
- All times are Central European Summer Time (UTC+02:00).

Date	Time		Score		Set 1	Set 2	Set 3	Set 4	Set 5	Total	Report
8 Jun	17:00	Argentina	1–3	Serbia	25–20	23–25	15–25	22–25		85–95	P2 Report
8 Jun	20:45	France	3–0	South Korea	25–21	25–18	25–22			75–61	P2 Report
9 Jun	18:00	France	3–1	Argentina	25–18	25–16	23–25	25–20		98–79	P2 Report
9 Jun	21:00	South Korea	0–3	Serbia	16–25	23–25	19–25			58–75	P2 Report
10 Jun	15:00	South Korea	0–3	Argentina	20–25	23–25	24–26			67–76	P2 Report
10 Jun	18:00	France	3–0	Serbia	31–29	25–16	25–15			81–60	P2 Report

=== Week 4 ===
==== Pool 13 ====
- All times are Korea Standard Time (UTC+09:00).

Date	Time		Score		Set 1	Set 2	Set 3	Set 4	Set 5	Total	Report
15 Jun	16:00	China	1–3	Italy	23–25	21–25	25–19	17–25		86–94	P2 Report
15 Jun	19:00	South Korea	1–3	Australia	25–23	19–25	19–25	21–25		84–98	P2 Report
16 Jun	14:00	South Korea	2–3	Italy	23–25	19–25	25–22	25–22	12–15	104–109	P2 Report
16 Jun	17:00	Australia	3–1	China	25–27	41–39	29–27	25–21		120–114	P2 Report
17 Jun	14:00	South Korea	3–0	China	25–21	25–21	25–22			75–64	P2 Report
17 Jun	17:00	Italy	1–3	Australia	25–27	25–18	19–25	23–25		92–95	P2 Report

==== Pool 14 ====
- All times are Central European Summer Time (UTC+02:00).

Date	Time		Score		Set 1	Set 2	Set 3	Set 4	Set 5	Total	Report
15 Jun	18:00	Germany	2–3	Japan	22–25	25–21	15–25	25–20	12–15	99–106	P2 Report
15 Jun	20:30	Russia	3–0	Argentina	25–20	25–20	26–24			76–64	P2 Report
16 Jun	16:00	Germany	3–1	Argentina	25–19	25–19	20–25	25–22		95–85	P2 Report
16 Jun	19:00	Russia	3–0	Japan	25–16	25–22	25–23			75–61	P2 Report
17 Jun	12:00	Argentina	2–3	Japan	24–26	25–12	25–23	23–25	11–15	108–101	P2 Report
17 Jun	15:00	Germany	0–3	Russia	18–25	24–26	18–25			60–76	P2 Report

==== Pool 15 ====
- All times are Central Daylight Time (UTC−05:00).

Date	Time		Score		Set 1	Set 2	Set 3	Set 4	Set 5	Total	Report
15 Jun	17:30	Poland	0–3	Iran	24–26	24–26	22–25			70–77	P2 Report
15 Jun	20:00	United States	3–0	Serbia	25–22	25–16	25–14			75–52	P2 Report
16 Jun	14:00	Iran	2–3	Serbia	25–21	22–25	25–27	25–20	11–15	108–108	P2 Report
16 Jun	19:30	United States	3–0	Poland	25–20	25–19	25–19			75–58	P2 Report
17 Jun	12:00	Poland	0–3	Serbia	23–25	23–25	23–25			69–75	P2 Report
17 Jun	17:30	United States	3–0	Iran	29–27	25–20	26–24			80–71	P2 Report

==== Pool 16 ====
- All times are Eastern European Summer Time (UTC+03:00).

Date	Time		Score		Set 1	Set 2	Set 3	Set 4	Set 5	Total	Report
15 Jun	15:30	Canada	3–0	Brazil	25–22	34–32	25–23			84–77	P2 Report
15 Jun	18:30	Bulgaria	0–3	France	21–25	20–25	23–25			64–75	P2 Report
16 Jun	15:30	France	3–0	Brazil	25–19	25–23	25–23			75–65	P2 Report
16 Jun	18:30	Bulgaria	3–0	Canada	25–22	25–19	29–27			79–68	P2 Report
17 Jun	15:30	France	3–2	Canada	25–19	22–25	25–22	24–26	16–14	112–106	P2 Report
17 Jun	18:30	Bulgaria	3–2	Brazil	25–22	19–25	25–15	18–25	15–12	102–99	P2 Report

=== Week 5 ===
==== Pool 17 ====
- All times are Australian Eastern Standard Time (UTC+10:00).

Date	Time		Score		Set 1	Set 2	Set 3	Set 4	Set 5	Total	Report
22 Jun	18:40	Poland	3–0	Argentina	26–24	25–20	29–27			80–71	P2 Report
22 Jun	21:10	Australia	0–3	Brazil	22–25	19–25	19–25			60–75	P2 Report
23 Jun	17:40	Australia	1–3	Argentina	20–25	19–25	25–20	21–25		85–95	P2 Report
23 Jun	20:10	Brazil	3–1	Poland	25–22	25–23	23–25	25–23		98–93	P2 Report
24 Jun	12:10	Brazil	0–3	Argentina	23–25	22–25	21–25			66–75	P2 Report
24 Jun	15:10	Australia	0–3	Poland	16–25	24–26	23–25			63–76	P2 Report

==== Pool 18 ====
- All times are China Standard Time (UTC+08:00).

Date	Time		Score		Set 1	Set 2	Set 3	Set 4	Set 5	Total	Report
22 Jun	16:00	Canada	0–3	Serbia	21–25	18–25	17–25			56–75	P2 Report
22 Jun	19:30	China	3–1	Japan	25–16	25–21	18–25	25–22		93–84	P2 Report
23 Jun	16:00	Japan	1–3	Serbia	28–26	33–35	21–25	18–25		100–111	P2 Report
23 Jun	19:30	China	0–3	Canada	21–25	23–25	22–25			66–75	P2 Report
24 Jun	16:00	Japan	0–3	Canada	23–25	20–25	22–25			65–75	P2 Report
24 Jun	19:30	China	1–3	Serbia	21–25	22–25	25–17	15–25		83–92	P2 Report

==== Pool 19 ====
- All times are Iran Daylight Time (UTC+04:30).

Date	Time		Score		Set 1	Set 2	Set 3	Set 4	Set 5	Total	Report
22 Jun	16:00	Bulgaria	2–3	Germany	25–21	22–25	25–23	23–25	13–15	108–109	P2 Report
22 Jun	19:15	Iran	3–1	South Korea	27–25	23–25	25–22	25–23		100–95	P2 Report
23 Jun	16:00	Germany	3–0	South Korea	25–23	25–18	25–19			75–60	P2 Report
23 Jun	18:30	Iran	3–1	Bulgaria	25–22	25–15	23–25	25–14		98–76	P2 Report
24 Jun	16:00	Bulgaria	3–2	South Korea	19–25	25–22	25–18	22–25	15–12	106–102	P2 Report
24 Jun	18:30	Iran	3–2	Germany	25–20	23–25	25–22	22–25	15–11	110–103	P2 Report

==== Pool 20 ====
- All times are Central European Summer Time (UTC+02:00).

Date	Time		Score		Set 1	Set 2	Set 3	Set 4	Set 5	Total	Report
22 Jun	17:30	United States	2–3	France	21–25	25–23	28–26	20–25	12–15	106–114	P2 Report
22 Jun	20:50	Italy	0–3	Russia	21–25	22–25	20–25			63–75	P2 Report
23 Jun	17:30	United States	0–3	Russia	23–25	15–25	22–25			60–75	P2 Report
23 Jun	20:30	Italy	3–0	France	25–21	25–22	27–25			77–68	P2 Report
24 Jun	17:30	France	3–0	Russia	25–20	25–13	25–18			75–51	P2 Report
24 Jun	20:30	Italy	0–3	United States	23–25	17–25	27–29			67–79	P2 Report

== Final round ==
- All times are Central European Summer Time (UTC+02:00).

=== Pool play ===
==== Pool A ====
Pos	Team	Pld	W	L	Pts	SW	SL	SR	SPW	SPL	SPR	Qualification
1	France	2	2	0	5	6	2	3.000	183	159	1.151	Final four
2	Brazil	2	1	1	4	5	3	1.667	183	169	1.083	Final four
3	Serbia	2	0	2	0	0	6	0.000	115	153	0.752	

Date	Time		Score		Set 1	Set 2	Set 3	Set 4	Set 5	Total	Report
4 Jul	20:45	France	3–2	Brazil	22–25	25–20	21–25	25–22	15–13	108–105	P2 Report
5 Jul	20:45	Serbia	0–3	Brazil	16–25	26–28	19–25			61–78	P2 Report
6 Jul	20:45	France	3–0	Serbia	25–19	25–18	25–17			75–54	P2 Report

==== Pool B ====
Pos	Team	Pld	W	L	Pts	SW	SL	SR	SPW	SPL	SPR	Qualification
1	Russia	2	2	0	6	6	1	6.000	172	147	1.170	Final four
2	United States	2	1	1	3	3	3	1.000	142	136	1.044	Final four
3	Poland	2	0	2	0	1	6	0.167	144	175	0.823	

Date	Time		Score		Set 1	Set 2	Set 3	Set 4	Set 5	Total	Report
4 Jul	18:00	Russia	3–1	Poland	25–18	25–23	22–25	25–17		97–83	P2 Report
5 Jul	18:00	United States	3–0	Poland	28–26	25–17	25–18			78–61	P2 Report
6 Jul	18:00	Russia	3–0	United States	25–22	25–21	25–21			75–64	P2 Report

=== Final four ===
Semi-finals
7 July
France	3
United States	2
7 July
Russia	3
Brazil	0

Final
8 July
France	0
Russia	3
Third place match
8 July
United States	3
Brazil	0

==== Semi-finals ====
Date	Time		Score		Set 1	Set 2	Set 3	Set 4	Set 5	Total	Report
7 Jul	14:00	France	3–2	United States	25–18	25–17	23–25	24–26	15–13	112–99	P2 Report
7 Jul	17:00	Russia	3–0	Brazil	25–17	25–18	25–14			75–49	P2 Report

==== Third place match ====
Date	Time		Score		Set 1	Set 2	Set 3	Set 4	Set 5	Total	Report
8 Jul	17:00	United States	3–0	Brazil	25–21	28–26	28–26			81–73	P2 Report

==== Final ====
Date	Time		Score		Set 1	Set 2	Set 3	Set 4	Set 5	Total	Report
8 Jul	20:45	France	0–3	Russia	22–25	20–25	23–25			65–75	P2 Report

== Final standing ==
Rank	Team
1st place, gold medalist(s)	Russia
2nd place, silver medalist(s)	France
3rd place, bronze medalist(s)	United States
4	Brazil
5	Poland
5	Serbia
7	Canada
8	Italy
9	Germany
10	Iran
11	Bulgaria
12	Japan
13	Australia
14	Argentina
15	China
16	South Korea

2018 Men's VNL champions

Russia
First title

14-man roster

Ilya Vlasov, Dmitry Kovalyov, Artem Volvich, Anton Karpukhov, Dmitry Volkov (c), Aleksandr Sokolov, Igor Filippov, Dmitry Muserskiy, Viktor Poletaev, Maxim Mikhaylov, Egor Kliuka, Romanas Shkulyavichus, Igor Kobzar, Aleksey Kabeshov

Head coach
Sergey Shlyapnikov

== Awards ==
- Most valuable player
  Maxim Mikhaylov (RUS)
- Best setter
  Benjamin Toniutti (FRA)
- Best outside spikers
  Taylor Sander (USA)
  Dmitry Volkov (RUS)
- Best middle blockers
  Kévin Le Roux (FRA)
  Dmitry Muserskiy (RUS)
- Best opposite spiker
  Matt Anderson (USA)
- Best libero
  Jenia Grebennikov (FRA)

== Statistics leaders ==
=== Preliminary round ===
Statistics leaders correct at the end of preliminary round.

Best Scorers
	Player	Spikes	Blocks	Serves	Total
1	(China) Jiang Chuan	242	19	13	274
2	(Brazil) Wallace de Souza	181	19	16	216
3	(Iran) Milad Ebadipour	166	13	14	193
4	(Japan) Yūji Nishida	167	6	14	187
5	(Russia) Dmitry Muserskiy	146	25	14	185

Best Attackers
	Player	Spikes	Faults	Shots	Total	%
1	(Russia) Dmitry Muserskiy	146	15	62	223	65.47
2	(China) Jiang Chuan	242	91	107	440	55.00
3	(United States) Matt Anderson	136	44	72	252	53.97
4	(Serbia) Dražen Luburić	136	37	86	259	52.51
5	(Germany) Christian Fromm	133	42	83	259	52.51

Best Blockers
	Player	Blocks	Faults	Rebounds	Total	Avg
1	(Bulgaria) Svetoslav Gotsev	34	69	80	183	0.57
2	(Argentina) Agustín Loser	32	80	92	204	0.56
3	(Russia) Ilya Vlasov	27	79	60	166	0.54
4	(China) Rao Shuhan	29	54	33	116	0.54
5	(Poland) Jakub Kochanowski	26	45	50	121	0.51

Best Servers
	Player	Aces	Faults	Hits	Total	Avg
1	(France) Earvin N'Gapeth	17	34	74	125	0.31
2	(Germany) Jan Zimmermann	18	25	130	173	0.31
3	(United States) Matt Anderson	17	44	98	159	0.30
4	(Brazil) Wallace de Souza	16	18	139	173	0.29
5	(Canada) Graham Vigrass	15	17	158	190	0.28

Best Setters
	Player	Running	Faults	Still	Total	Avg
1	(Argentina) Maximiliano Cavanna	995	5	285	1285	17.46
2	(Iran) Saeid Marouf	830	11	323	1164	14.07
3	(Russia) Igor Kobzar	669	9	148	826	13.38
4	(Canada) TJ Sanders	679	7	300	986	12.81
5	(United States) Micah Christenson	694	4	44	742	12.39

Best Diggers
	Player	Digs	Faults	Receptions	Total	Avg
1	(Australia) Luke Perry	73	0	136	209	1.30
2	(Argentina) Maximiliano Cavanna	68	0	104	172	1.19
3	(United States) Micah Christenson	65	0	35	100	1.16
4	(France) Jenia Grebennikov	60	0	89	149	1.11
5	(Poland) Paweł Zatorski	54	12	71	137	1.06

Best Receivers
	Player	Excellents	Faults	Serve	Total	%
1	(Poland) Paweł Zatorski	59	9	137	205	24.39
2	(Italy) Filippo Lanza	61	12	144	217	22.58
3	(Japan) Tatsuya Fukuzawa	82	15	215	312	21.47
4	(Argentina) Tomás López	63	9	190	262	20.61
5	(Argentina) Santiago Danani	91	16	260	367	20.44

=== Final round ===
Statistics leaders correct at the end of final round.

Best Scorers
	Player	Spikes	Blocks	Serves	Total
1	(France) Stéphen Boyer	64	8	3	75
2	(France) Earvin N'Gapeth	58	4	5	67
3	(Russia) Maxim Mikhaylov	53	5	5	63
4	(Brazil) Wallace de Souza	59	2	0	61
5	(United States) Matt Anderson	46	1	4	51

Best Attackers
	Player	Spikes	Faults	Shots	Total	%
1	(Poland) Bartosz Kurek	21	5	7	33	63.64
2	(France) Stéphen Boyer	64	17	26	107	59.81
3	(Russia) Maxim Mikhaylov	53	10	26	89	59.55
4	(Brazil) Wallace de Souza	59	20	22	101	58.42
5	(Serbia) Marko Ivović	15	6	6	27	55.56

Best Blockers
	Player	Blocks	Faults	Rebounds	Total	Avg
1	(Brazil) Lucas Saatkamp	11	16	27	54	0.79
2	(Russia) Egor Kliuka	9	7	3	19	0.69
3	(Brazil) Maurício Souza	9	18	12	39	0.64
4	(France) Kévin Le Roux	9	22	12	43	0.56
5	(Russia) Dmitry Volkov	7	10	10	27	0.54

Best Servers
	Player	Aces	Faults	Hits	Total	Avg
1	(Russia) Egor Kliuka	6	6	38	50	0.46
2	(France) Thibault Rossard	7	10	30	47	0.44
3	(Russia) Dmitry Volkov	5	13	35	53	0.38
4	(Russia) Maxim Mikhaylov	5	10	40	55	0.38
5	(Serbia) Srećko Lisinac	2	4	10	16	0.33

Best Setters
	Player	Running	Faults	Still	Total	Avg
1	(Brazil) Bruno Rezende	252	3	4	259	18.00
2	(Russia) Dmitry Kovalyov	226	5	2	233	17.38
3	(France) Benjamin Toniutti	276	1	0	277	17.25
4	(United States) Micah Christenson	238	1	2	241	17.00
5	(Serbia) Nikola Jovović	95	0	1	96	15.83

Best Diggers
	Player	Digs	Faults	Receptions	Total	Avg
1	(Poland) Paweł Zatorski	14	0	16	30	2.00
2	(Brazil) Thales Hoss	26	0	29	55	1.86
3	(Russia) Dmitry Volkov	18	0	12	30	1.38
4	(France) Earvin N'Gapeth	20	0	11	31	1.25
5	(Russia) Aleksey Kabeshov	16	0	16	32	1.23

Best Receivers
	Player	Excellents	Faults	Serve	Total	%
1	(Brazil) Thales Hoss	24	4	47	75	26.67
2	(Brazil) Lucas Lóh	20	5	45	70	21.43
3	(United States) Taylor Sander	19	4	49	72	20.83
4	(France) Jenia Grebennikov	13	2	61	76	14.47
5	(France) Earvin N'Gapeth	18	4	77	99	14.14

== See also ==
- 2018 FIVB Men's Volleyball Challenger Cup
