= Matt Anderson (volleyball) =

American volleyball player (born 1987)

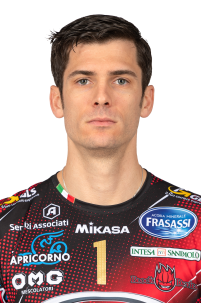
- Anderson in 2021

Personal information
- Full name: Matthew John Anderson
- Nickname: Matt, Matty
- Born: April 18, 1987 (age 39); Buffalo, New York, U.S.
- Hometown: West Seneca, New York, U.S.
- Height: 6 ft 10 in (2.08 m)
- Weight: 212.0 lb (96.16 kg)
- Spike: 140 in (360 cm)
- Block: 131 in (332 cm)
- Education: Pennsylvania State University

Volleyball information
- Position: Outside hitter / opposite
- Current club: Nippon Steel Sakai Blazers

Career
Years	Teams
2006–2008; 2008–2010; 2010–2011; 2011–2012; 2012–2019; 2019–2020; 2021–2022; 2022–2023; 2023–2025; 2025-	Penn State Nittany Lions; Hyundai Capital; Volley Callipo; Modena Volley; Zenit Kazan; Modena Volley; Sir Safety Perugia; Zenit Saint Petersburg; Ziraat Bankası Ankara; Nippon Steel Sakai Blazers

National team
2008– still playing	United States
Medal record
Men's volleyball
Representing United States
Olympic Games
Bronze medal – third place	2016 Rio de Janeiro	Team
Bronze medal – third place	2024 Paris	Team
FIVB World Championship
Bronze medal – third place	2018 Italy/Bulgaria
FIVB World Cup
Gold medal – first place	2015 Japan
Gold medal – first place	2023 Japan
Bronze medal – third place	2019 Japan
FIVB World League
Gold medal – first place	2014 Florence
Silver medal – second place	2012 Sofia
Bronze medal – third place	2015 Rio de Janeiro
FIVB Nations League
Silver medal – second place	2019 Chicago
Silver medal – second place	2023 Gdańsk
Silver medal – second place	2026 Ningbo
Bronze medal – third place	2018 Lille
Pan American Cup
Gold medal – first place	2008 Winnipeg
NORCECA Championship
Gold medal – first place	2013 Langley
Gold medal – first place	2017 Colorado Springs
Gold medal – first place	2023 Charleston
Silver medal – second place	2011 Mayaguez

Matthew John Anderson (born April 18, 1987) is an American professional volleyball player and member of the United States men's national volleyball team. He is a two-time Olympic medalist, having won bronze medals at the 2016 and 2024 Summer Olympics, and was part of the gold-winning teams at the 2014 World League and 2015 World Cup. With the Russian volleyball club Zenit Kazan, he has won numerous CEV Champions League titles.

== Early life ==
Anderson was born in Buffalo, New York and raised in the nearby town of West Seneca. He grew up playing multiple sports and began playing volleyball at age 15. He attended West Seneca West High School, where he led his volleyball team to a state championship in 2004 and a 17–0 record in his senior year.

Anderson attended Pennsylvania State University, where he helped the volleyball team win their second-ever NCAA Championship. He was named Most Outstanding Player and AVCA Player of the Year for his performance.

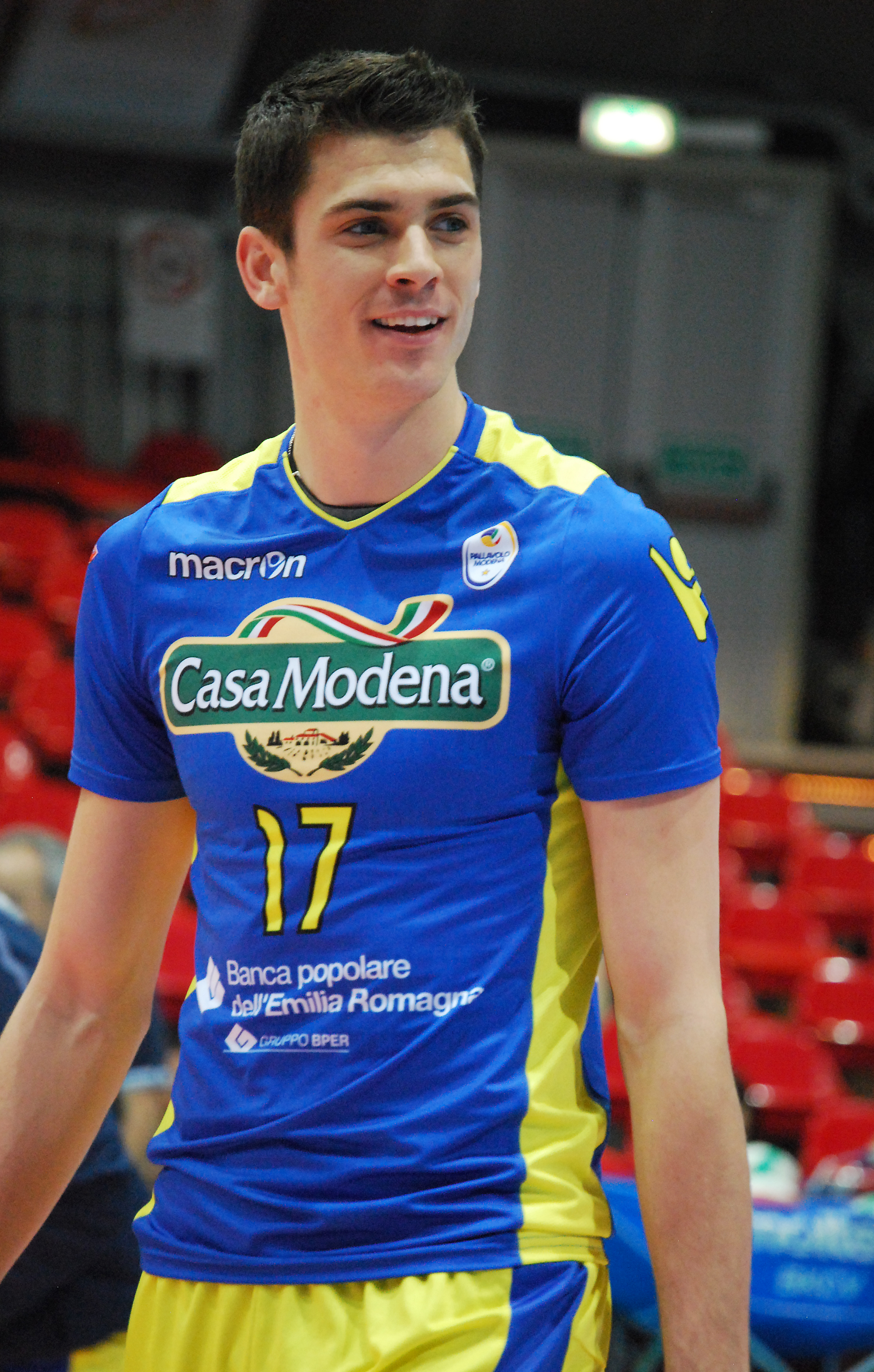
Anderson during a match Copra Elior Piacenza – Casa Modena on January 2, 2012.

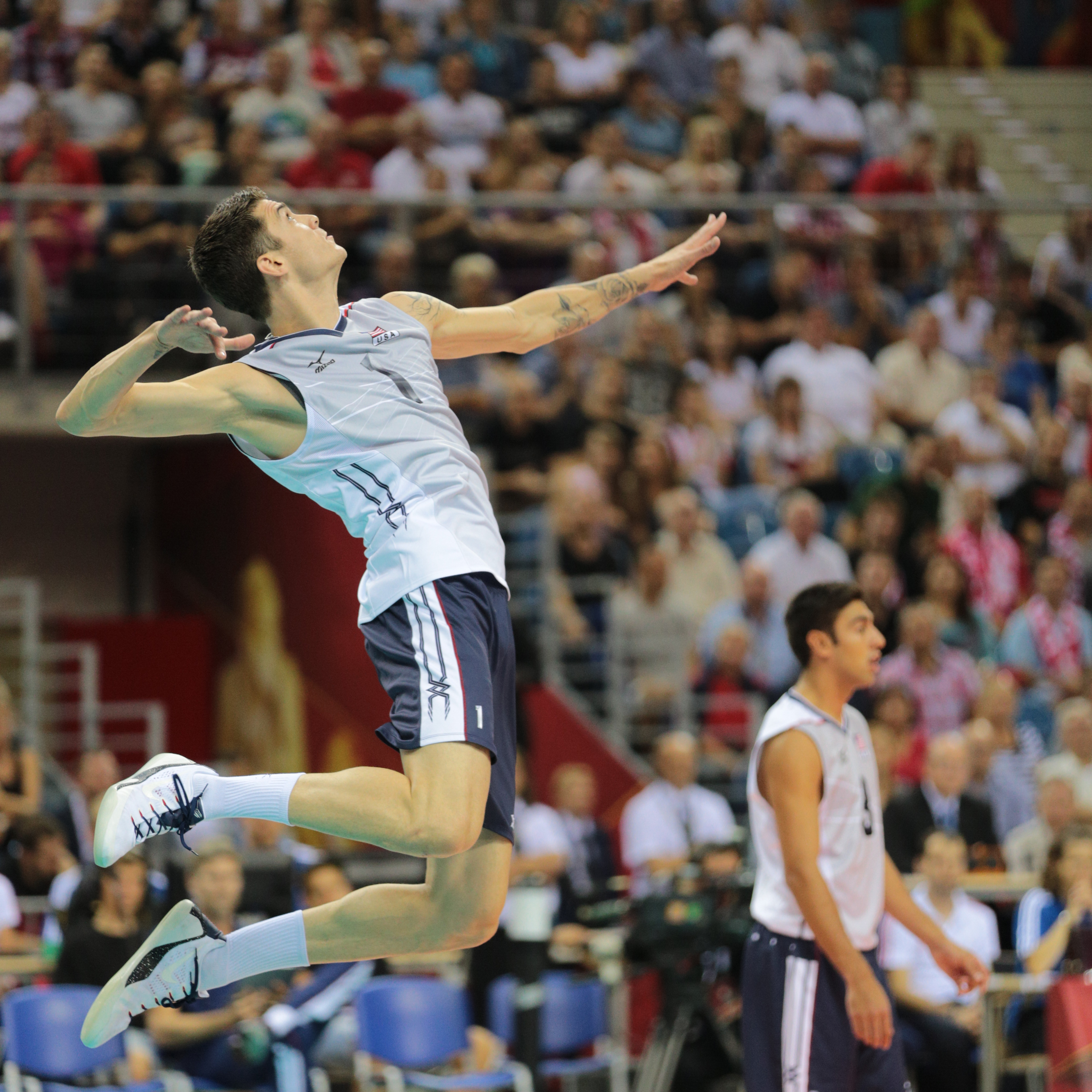
Anderson during the 2014 World Championship playing against Italy in Kraków, Poland.

== Career ==
=== Club ===
On July 1, 2008, Anderson announced he would forgo his 2009 senior year at Penn State and signed a professional contract with Hyundai Capital Skywalkers of the Korean League. In his debut season, Anderson helped the Skywalkers claim first in the regular season before losing 3–1 in the championship series. He then played two seasons in the Italian league, first as part of Tonno Callipo Vibo Valentia and then for Casa Modena.

In 2012, he moved to Zenit Kazan in Russia. During his first year with the team, he won a bronze medal in the Russian Championship and CEV Champions League. In 2014, Zenit Kazan won the Russian Championship, with Anderson being named Most Valuable Player of the league. He played with Zenit Kazan until 2018.

Anderson returned to Modena Volley for the 2019–20 season. In 2021, he joined Sir Safety Perugia, then returned to Russia to play with Zenit Saint Petersburg in 2022. In his 2023–2024 season, Anderson played for Ziraat Bankasi of the Turkish league. After earning bronze in the Champions League with the team, Anderson was named best outside hitter.

=== National team ===
Anderson has been a member of the United States men's national volleyball team since 2008 and has been the team's leading scorer since 2011. In 2012, Anderson was the youngest player named to the roster for the 2012 Summer Olympics. With the team, he earned a bronze medal at the 2016 and 2024 Summer Olympics.

In addition to the Olympics, Anderson has earned numerous medals at major international competitions, including gold at the 2015 World Cup and 2013 and 2023 NORCECA Continental Championships, silver at the 2019 and 2023 Volleyball Nations League, and bronze at the 2018 Volleyball Nations League and 2019 World Cup.

== Personal life ==
Anderson married food stylist and photographer Jackie Gillum in 2020. They have two children together, a son named Michael James and a daughter named Virginia June. The family resides in Zionsville, Indiana. Anderson is close friends with his Penn State and U.S. national teammate Max Holt, whom he considers an uncle to his children.

In 2014, Anderson took a break from volleyball due to depression stemming from the deaths of his father and cousin.

== Honors ==
=== Club ===
- CEV Champions League
  - 2014–15 – with Zenit Kazan
  - 2015–16 – with Zenit Kazan
  - 2016–17 – with Zenit Kazan
  - 2017–18 – with Zenit Kazan
  - 2018–19 – with Zenit Kazan
- FIVB Club World Championship
  - Betim 2015 – with Zenit Kazan
  - Betim 2016 – with Zenit Kazan
  - Poland 2017 – with Zenit Kazan
- Domestic
  - 2008–09 South Korean Championship, with Cheonan Hyundai Capital Skywalkers
  - 2012–13 Russian SuperCup, with Zenit Kazan
  - 2013–14 Russian Championship, with Zenit Kazan
  - 2014–15 Russian Cup, with Zenit Kazan
  - 2014–15 Russian Championship, with Zenit Kazan
  - 2015–16 Russian SuperCup, with Zenit Kazan
  - 2015–16 Russian Cup, with Zenit Kazan
  - 2015–16 Russian Championship, with Zenit Kazan
  - 2016–17 Russian SuperCup, with Zenit Kazan
  - 2016–17 Russian Cup, with Zenit Kazan
  - 2016–17 Russian Championship, with Zenit Kazan
  - 2017–18 Russian SuperCup, with Zenit Kazan
  - 2017–18 Russian Cup, with Zenit Kazan
  - 2017–18 Russian Championship, with Zenit Kazan
  - 2018–19 Russian SuperCup, with Zenit Kazan
  - 2018–19 Russian Cup, with Zenit Kazan
  - 2021–22 Italian Cup, with Sir Safety Perugia

=== Individual awards ===
- 2007: AVCA Second-Team All-American
- 2008: AVCA First-Team All-American
- 2008: AVCA Co-National Player of the Year
- 2008: MIVA – All–Championship Team
- 2008: NCAA National Championship – Most outstanding player
- 2012: Player of the Year United States
- 2013: Player of the Year United States
- 2013: NORCECA Championship – Most valuable player
- 2013: NORCECA Championship – Best outside spiker
- 2014: Russian League – Most valuable player
- 2014: Player of the Year United States
- 2015: FIVB World Cup – Most valuable player
- 2015: Player of the Year United States
- 2017: FIVB World Grand Champions Cup – Best opposite spiker
- 2018: FIVB Nations League – Best opposite spiker
- 2018: FIVB World Championship – Best opposite spiker
- 2019: FIVB Nations League – Best opposite spiker
- 2019: FIVB Nations League – Most valuable player

== See also ==
- List of Pennsylvania State University Olympians

Awards
Preceded by (Russia) Maxim Mikhaylov	Most Valuable Player of FIVB World Cup; 2015	Succeeded by (Brazil) Alan Souza
Preceded by (Brazil) Wallace de Souza	Best Opposite Spiker of FIVB World Grand Champions Cup; 2017	Succeeded by Incumbent
Preceded by Not awarded	Best Opposite Spiker of FIVB Nations League; 2018; 2019	Succeeded by (Brazil) Wallace de Souza (Poland) Bartosz Kurek
Preceded by (Poland) Mariusz Wlazły	Best Opposite Spiker of FIVB World Championship; 2018	Succeeded by (Poland) Bartosz Kurek
Preceded by (Russia) Maxim Mikhaylov	Most Valuable Player of FIVB Nations League; 2019	Succeeded by (Brazil) Wallace de Souza (Poland) Bartosz Kurek
