= Dmitry Kovalëv (volleyball) =

Russian volleyball player (born 1991)

Dmitry Kovalev

Personal information
- Full name: Dmitry Mikhaylovich Kovalev
- Nationality: Russian
- Born: 15 March 1991 (age 35); Perm, Russia, USSR
- Height: 1.98 m (6 ft 6 in)
- Weight: 82 kg (181 lb)
- Spike: 340 cm (134 in)
- Block: 330 cm (130 in)

Volleyball information
- Position: Setter
- Current club: VC Zenit Saint Petersburg
- Number: 3

Career
Years	Teams
2009–2013; 2013–2017; 2017–2019; 2019–2021; 2021–2022; 2022-	Prikamye Perm; Guberniya Nizhniy Novgorod; Ural Ufa; VC Zenit Saint Petersburg; Belogorie; VC Zenit Saint Petersburg

National team
2014–	Russia
Honours
Men's volleyball
Representing Russia
Nations League
Gold medal – first place	2018 Lille
Gold medal – first place	2019 Chicago
European Games
Bronze medal – third place	2015 Baku
FIVB Men's U21 World
Gold medal – first place	2011 Rio de Janeiro
FIVB Men's U23 World
Bronze medal – third place	2013 Uberlândia
- Last updated: 20 August 2022

Dmitry Mikhaylovich Kovalev (Russian: Дмитрий Михайлович Ковалёв; born 15 March 1991) is a Russian male volleyball player. He is part of the Russia men's national volleyball team. On club level he plays for VC Zenit Saint Petersburg.

== Achievements ==
=== National team ===
- 2018 FIVB Nations League
- 2019 FIVB Nations League
