= Micah Christenson =

American volleyball player (born 1993)

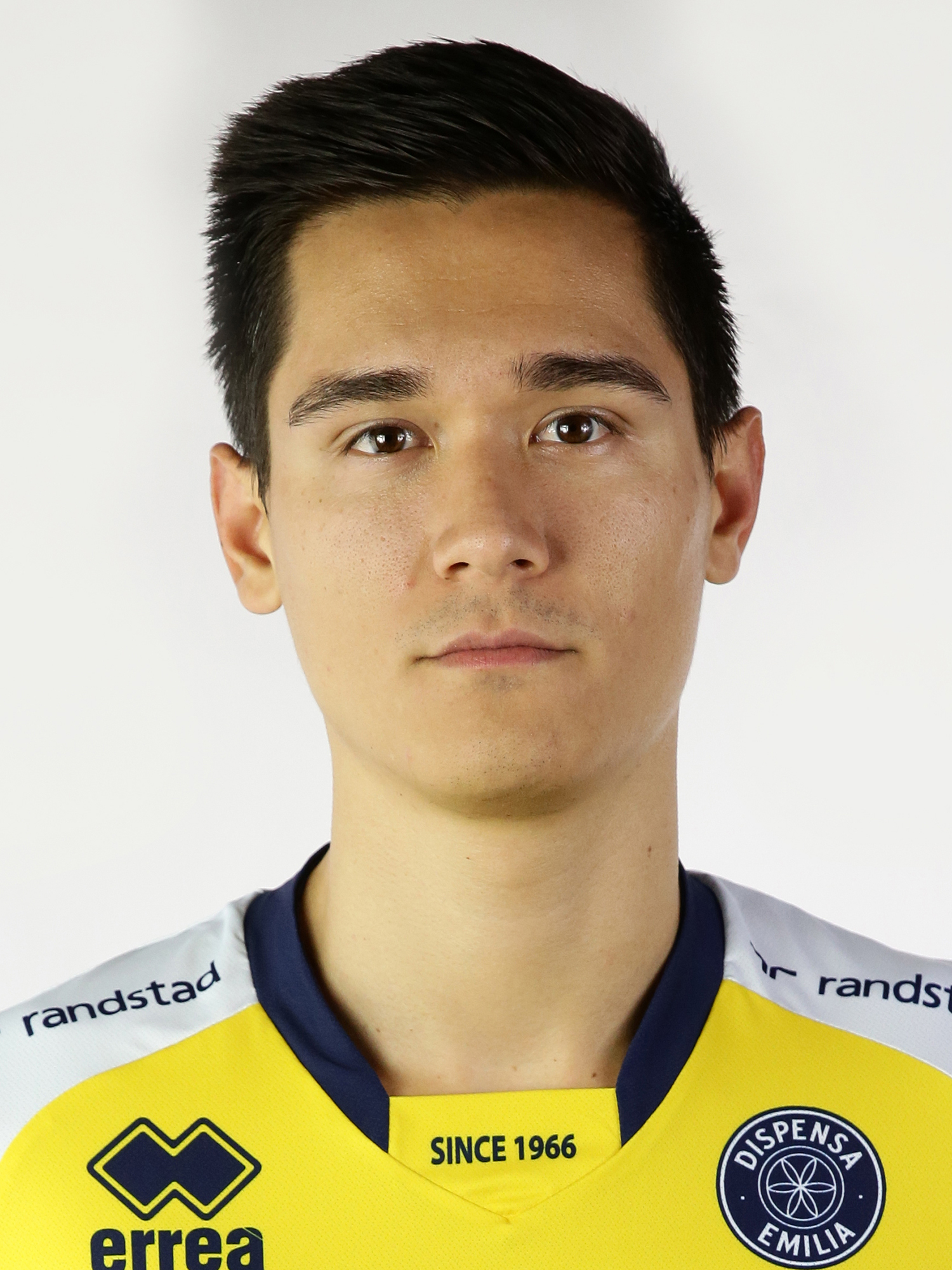
- Christenson with Modena Volley in 2019

Personal information
- Full name: Micah Makanamaikalani Christenson
- Born: May 8, 1993 (age 33); Honolulu, Hawaii, U.S.
- Height: 6 ft 6 in (1.98 m)
- Weight: 194 lb (88 kg)
- Spike: 137 in (349 cm)
- Block: 130 in (340 cm)
- Education: University of Southern California

Volleyball information
- Position: Setter
- Current club: Rana Verona
- Number: 11

Career
| Years | Teams |
|---|---|
| 2012–2015; 2015–2018; 2018–2021; 2021–2025; 2025– | USC Trojans; Volley Lube; Modena Volley; Zenit Kazan; Rana Verona |

National team
| 2013– | United States |
Medal record
Men's volleyball
Representing United States
Olympic Games
| Bronze medal – third place | 2016 Rio de Janeiro | Team |
| Bronze medal – third place | 2024 Paris | Team |
FIVB World Championship
| Bronze medal – third place | 2018 Italy/Bulgaria |
FIVB World Cup
| Gold medal – first place | 2015 Japan |
| Gold medal – first place | 2023 Japan |
| Bronze medal – third place | 2019 Japan |
FIVB World League
| Gold medal – first place | 2014 Florence |
| Bronze medal – third place | 2015 Rio de Janeiro |
FIVB Nations League
| Silver medal – second place | 2019 Chicago |
| Silver medal – second place | 2022 Bologna |
| Silver medal – second place | 2023 Gdańsk |
| Silver medal – second place | 2026 Ningbo |
| Bronze medal – third place | 2018 Lille |
NORCECA Championship
| Gold medal – first place | 2013 Langley |
| Gold medal – first place | 2017 Colorado Springs |
| Gold medal – first place | 2023 Charleston |

Micah Makanamaikalani Christenson (/ˈkrɪstʃənsən/ KRISS-chən-sən; May 8, 1993) is an American professional volleyball player who plays as a setter for Rana Verona and the U.S. national team. He was a bronze medalist at the Olympic Games Rio 2016, Paris 2024 and the 2018 World Championship; the 2014 World League, 2015 World Cup and 2023 World Cup winner.

== Personal life ==
Christenson was born in Honolulu, Hawaii, to Robert and Charlene Christenson. His parents both attended the University of Hawaii at Hilo, where his father, Robert, played basketball and his mother, Charlene, won three volleyball national championships and was named a two-time All-American. His sister, Joanna, played volleyball at Southern Utah University. Christenson began playing club volleyball in 2005 with Asics Quicksilver; he also played basketball and was two time Gatorade Player of the year in Hawai'i.

Christenson is married to Brooke Christenson. They have two sons and a daughter together. Christenson is a Christian.

== Career ==
Christenson was a basketball and volleyball player for Kamehameha Schools Kapālama in Honolulu, graduating in 2011. He led his teams to three state championship titles (basketball in 2009 and 2011, and volleyball in 2011) and played in six state championship games. He attended the University of Southern California and played for the USC Trojans men's volleyball team. He was a starter on the U.S. Junior National Team that won a gold medal in the 2010 NORCECA Junior Championship in Canada and also played the FIVB 2009 Boy's Youth World Championship in Italy. In 2011 he played for the U.S. Junior National Team during the 2011 FIVB Men’s Junior World Championship in Brazil where the team placed fourth. He captained the U.S. Junior National Team to win a gold medal at the 2012 NORCECA Men's Junior Continental Championship in Colorado Springs.

He was supposed to play on the 2013 U.S. Men’s Junior National Team but got called up to the senior team instead. He debuted with the U.S. national team at the NORCECA Championship, which U.S. won; Christenson was named Best Server and Best Setter in this tournament. He also competed in the 2013 FIVB World Grand Champions Cup. In 2014 he won the gold medal at the World League, held in Florence, Italy. He began senior-level competition at age 20. He is the youngest starting setter to ever compete for the U.S. on a national team for both junior level and senior level.

At club level, he played on the team that won 2016-2017 Superlega, Italy's top championship, with Cucine Lube Civitanova.

As of 2021, he signed a two-year contract to play in the Russian club, Zenit Kazan. Suffering only one loss in the entirety of the 2020 Russian SuperLeague in their first match against Dynamo Moscow, Kazan was able to win the first season of the Superleague.

== Honors ==
=== Club ===
- CEV Champions League
  - 2017–18 – with Cucine Lube Civitanova
- FIVB Club World Championship
  - Poland 2017 – with Cucine Lube Civitanova
- Domestic
  - 2016–17 Italian Cup, with Cucine Lube Civitanova
  - 2016–17 Italian Championship, with Cucine Lube Civitanova
  - 2018–19 Italian Supercup, with Modena Volley
  - 2021–22 Russian Cup, with Zenit Kazan
  - 2022–23 Russian Cup, with Zenit Kazan
  - 2022–23 Russian Superleague, with Zenit Kazan

=== Individual awards ===
- 2013: NORCECA Championship – Best setter
- 2013: NORCECA Championship – Best server
- 2015: FIVB World Cup – Best setter
- 2017: NORCECA Championship – Most valuable player
- 2018: FIVB World Championship – Best setter
- 2019: FIVB Nations League – Best setter
- 2019: FIVB World Cup – Best setter
- 2022: FIVB Nations League – Best setter
- 2023: FIVB Nations League – Best setter
- 2023: NORCECA Championship – Most valuable player

Awards
| Preceded by (Argentina) Luciano De Cecco | Best Setter of FIVB World Cup; 2015; 2019 | Succeeded by Incumbent |
| Preceded by (Germany) Lukas Kampa | Best Setter of FIVB World Championship; 2018 | Succeeded by (Italy) Simone Giannelli |
| Preceded by (France) Benjamin Toniutti | Best Setter of FIVB Nations League; 2019 | Succeeded by (Poland) Fabian Drzyzga |
| Preceded by (Poland) Fabian Drzyzga | Best Setter of FIVB Nations League; 2022; 2023 | Succeeded by (France) Antoine Brizard |
