= 2019 FIVB Men's Volleyball Nations League =

Tournament details
- Host country: United States
- City: Chicago (final round)
- Dates: 31 May – 14 July
- Teams: 16 (from 4 confederations)
- Venue: 21 (in 21 host cities)

Final positions
- Champions: Russia (2nd title)
- Runners-up: United States
- Third place: Poland
- Fourth place: Brazil
- Relegated: Portugal

Tournament awards
- MVP: (United States) Matt Anderson
- Best Setter: (United States) Micah Christenson
- Best OH: (Poland) Bartosz Bednorz; (Russia) Dmitry Volkov; (Russia) Egor Kliuka
- Best MB: (Russia) Ivan Iakovlev; (United States) Maxwell Holt
- Best OPP: (Russia) Viktor Poletaev
- Best Libero: (United States) Erik Shoji

Tournament statistics
- Matches played: 130
- Attendance: 449,809 (3,460 per match)

The 2019 FIVB Men's Volleyball Nations League was the second edition of the FIVB Men's Volleyball Nations League, an annual international men's volleyball tournament contested by 16 national teams. The competition was held between May and July 2019, and the final round took place in the Credit Union 1 Arena, Chicago, United States. This was the first edition of the World League or the Nations League to have the final round hosted in North America.

Following the results of the 2018 Nations League and 2018 Challenger Cup, South Korea were replaced by debutants Portugal in this edition.

Portugal were the last placed challenger team after the preliminary round and will be replaced by 2019 Challenger Cup winners Slovenia in the 2020 edition.

Russia successfully defended its title, defeating finals hosts, the United States, in the final. Poland claimed the bronze after sweeping Brazil in three straight sets. Matt Anderson from United States named the MVP of the tournament.

== Teams ==
=== Qualification ===
Sixteen teams qualified for the competition. Twelve of them qualified as core teams which cannot face relegation. Other four teams were selected as challenger teams which could be relegated from the tournament. Portugal replaced South Korea after winning the 2018 Challenger Cup.

Country	Confederation	Designation	Previous appearances			Previous best performance
Country	Confederation	Designation	Total	First	Last	Previous best performance
Argentina	CSV	Core team	1	2018	2018	14th place (2018)
Australia	AVC	Challenger team	1	2018	2018	13th place (2018)
Brazil	CSV	Core team	1	2018	2018	4th place (2018)
Bulgaria	CEV	Challenger team	1	2018	2018	11th place (2018)
Canada	NORCECA	Challenger team	1	2018	2018	7th place (2018)
China	AVC	Core team	1	2018	2018	15th place (2018)
France	CEV	Core team	1	2018	2018	Runners-up (2018)
Germany	CEV	Core team	1	2018	2018	9th place (2018)
Iran	AVC	Core team	1	2018	2018	10th place (2018)
Italy	CEV	Core team	1	2018	2018	8th place (2018)
Japan	AVC	Core team	1	2018	2018	12th place (2018)
Poland	CEV	Core team	1	2018	2018	5th place (2018)
Portugal	CEV	Challenger team	0	None		Debut
Russia	CEV	Core team	1	2018	2018	Champions (2018)
Serbia	CEV	Core team	1	2018	2018	5th place (2018)
United States	NORCECA	Core team	1	2018	2018	3rd place (2018)

== Format ==
=== Preliminary round ===
The 16 teams competed in a round-robin format, with every core team hosting a pool at least once. The teams were divided into 4 pools of 4 teams at each week and competed for five weeks, totalling 120 matches. The top five teams after the preliminary round joined the hosts of the final round to compete in the final round. The relegation took into consideration only the 4 challenger teams. The last-ranked challenger team was excluded from the 2020 Volleyball Nations League. The winners of the 2019 Challenger Cup qualified for the next edition as a challenger team.

=== Final round ===
The six qualified teams played in 2 pools of 3 teams in a round-robin format. The top 2 teams of each pool qualified for the semifinals. The pool winners played against the runners-up in this round. The semifinals winners advanced to compete for the Volleyball Nations League title. The losers faced each other in the third place match.

== Pools composition ==
The overview of pools was released on October 23, 2018.

=== Preliminary round ===
Week 1
Pool 1 China	Pool 2 Argentina	Pool 3 Poland	Pool 4 Serbia
China; Germany; Iran; Italy	Argentina; Portugal; Canada; Bulgaria	Poland; United States; Brazil; Australia	Serbia; France; Russia; Japan
Week 2
Pool 5 China	Pool 6 Russia	Pool 7 Japan	Pool 8 Canada
China; Bulgaria; Poland; France	Russia; Italy; United States; Portugal	Japan; Argentina; Iran; Brazil	Canada; Australia; Germany; Serbia
Week 3
Pool 9 Portugal	Pool 10 Bulgaria	Pool 11 Iran	Pool 12 France
Portugal; Brazil; China; Serbia	Bulgaria; Japan; Italy; Australia	Iran; Canada; Poland; Russia	France; Argentina; United States; Germany
Week 4
Pool 13 United States	Pool 14 Italy	Pool 15 Iran	Pool 16 Brazil
United States; Japan; China; Canada	Italy; Argentina; Serbia; Poland	Iran; France; Portugal; Australia	Brazil; Bulgaria; Germany; Russia
Week 5
Pool 17 Australia	Pool 18 Brazil	Pool 19 Bulgaria	Pool 20 Germany
Australia; Argentina; China; Russia	Brazil; Italy; Canada; France	Bulgaria; Iran; Serbia; United States	Germany; Japan; Portugal; Poland

=== Final round ===
Pool A	Pool B
United States (Hosts); Russia (preliminary round 3rd); France (preliminary round 4th)	Brazil (preliminary round 1st); Iran (preliminary round 2nd); Poland (preliminary round 5th)

== Venues ==
The list of host cities and venues was announced on 26 March 2019.

=== Preliminary round ===
Week 1
Pool 1	Pool 2	Pool 3	Pool 4
Jiangmen, China	Mendoza, Argentina	Katowice, Poland	Novi Sad, Serbia
Jiangmen Sports Center Gymnasium	Aconcagua Arena	Spodek	SPC Vojvodina
Capacity: 8,500	Capacity: 10,000	Capacity: 11,500	Capacity: 6,987
Week 2
Pool 5	Pool 6	Pool 7	Pool 8
Ningbo, China	Ufa, Russia	Tokyo, Japan	Ottawa, Canada
Beilun Gymnasium	Ufa Arena	Musashino Forest Sports Plaza	TD Place Arena
Capacity: 4,000	Capacity: 8,250	Capacity: 10,000	Capacity: 9,500
Week 3
Pool 9	Pool 10	Pool 11	Pool 12
Gondomar, Portugal	Varna, Bulgaria	Urmia, Iran	Cannes, France
Multiusos de Gondomar	Palace of Culture and Sports	Ghadir Arena	Palais des Victoires
Capacity: 5,000	Capacity: 6,000	Capacity: 6,000	Capacity: 4,000
Week 4
Pool 13	Pool 14	Pool 15	Pool 16
Hoffman Estates, United States	Milan, Italy	Ardabil, Iran	Cuiabá, Brazil
Sears Centre Arena	PalaLido	Rezazadeh Stadium	Ginásio Aecim Tocantins
Capacity: 10,000	Capacity: 5,420	Capacity: 6,000	Capacity: 12,000
Week 5
Pool 17	Pool 18	Pool 19	Pool 20
Brisbane, Australia	Brasília, Brazil	Plovdiv, Bulgaria	Leipzig, Germany
Queensland State Netball Centre	Nilson Nelson Gymnasium	Kolodruma	Arena Leipzig
Capacity: 5,000	Capacity: 11,105	Capacity: 6,100	Capacity: 12,000

=== Final round ===
All matches
Chicago, United States
Credit Union 1 Arena
Capacity: 10,000
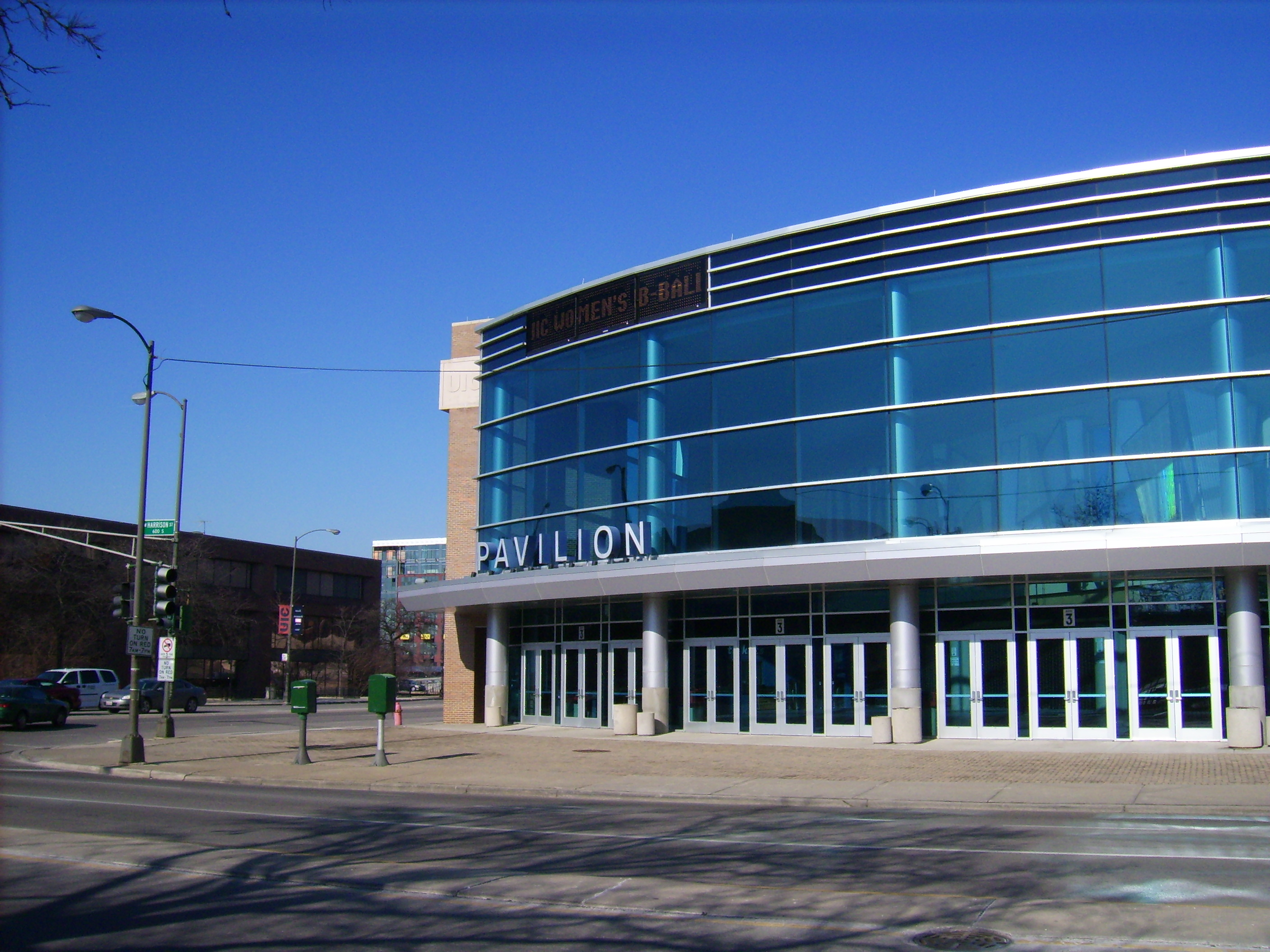

== Competition schedule ==
●	Preliminary round	●	Final round

Week 1 31 May – 2 Jun	Week 2 7–9 Jun	Week 3 14–16 Jun	Week 4 21–23 Jun	Week 5 28–30 Jun	Week 6 Rest Week	Week 7 10–14 Jul
24 matches	24 matches	24 matches	24 matches	24 matches		10 matches

== Pool standing procedure ==
To determine the pools standings, the following criteria is applied:

1. Total number of victories (matches won, matches lost)
2. In the event of a tie, the following first tiebreaker applied: The teams were ranked by the most points gained per match as follows:
  - Match won 3–0 or 3–1: 3 points for the winner, 0 points for the loser
  - Match won 3–2: 2 points for the winner, 1 point for the loser
  - Match forfeited: 3 points for the winner, 0 points (0–25, 0–25, 0–25) for the loser
3. Where teams were still tied after an examination of the number of their victories and points gained, then the FIVB examined the results to break the tie in the following order:
  - Sets quotient: if two or more teams were tied on the number of points gained, they were ranked by the quotient resulting from the division of the number of all sets won by the number of all sets lost.
  - Points quotient: where the tie persisted based on the sets quotient, the teams were ranked by the quotient resulting from the division of all points scored by the total of points lost during all sets.
  - Where the tie persisted based on the points quotient, the tie was broken based on the team that won the match of the Round Robin Phase between the tied teams. Where the tie in points quotient was between three or more teams, these teams were ranked taking into consideration only the matches the teams in question were involved in.

== Preliminary round ==
=== Ranking ===
Pos	Team	Pld	W	L	Pts	SW	SL	SR	SPW	SPL	SPR	Qualification or relegation
1	Brazil	15	14	1	39	44	15	2.933	1408	1218	1.156	Final round
2	Iran	15	12	3	36	38	15	2.533	1276	1173	1.088	Final round
3	Russia	15	12	3	34	37	17	2.176	1284	1164	1.103	Final round
4	France	15	11	4	34	38	18	2.111	1341	1251	1.072	Final round
5	Poland	15	11	4	30	38	25	1.520	1465	1397	1.049	Final round
6	United States (Note: Qualified as hosts)	15	9	6	28	32	24	1.333	1317	1258	1.047	Final round
7	Argentina	15	8	7	26	33	26	1.269	1363	1304	1.045	
8	Italy	15	8	7	25	31	25	1.240	1316	1263	1.042	
9	Canada	15	8	7	23	29	29	1.000	1313	1321	0.994	
10	Japan	15	7	8	19	27	32	0.844	1318	1326	0.994	
11	Serbia	15	6	9	17	28	36	0.778	1393	1417	0.983	
12	Bulgaria	15	5	10	13	21	38	0.553	1268	1372	0.924	
13	Australia	15	3	12	13	20	37	0.541	1217	1334	0.912	
14	Germany	15	3	12	12	23	41	0.561	1349	1470	0.918	
15	Portugal	15	2	13	7	12	40	0.300	1095	1268	0.864	Excluded from Nations League
16	China	15	1	14	4	9	42	0.214	1047	1234	0.848	

Source: VNL 2019 Preliminary Round Standings

=== Week 1 ===
==== Pool 1 ====
- All times are China Standard Time (UTC+08:00).

Date	Time		Score		Set 1	Set 2	Set 3	Set 4	Set 5	Total	Report
31 May	16:00	Iran	3–1	Italy	20–25	25–23	25–23	25–23		95–94	P2 Report
31 May	20:00	China	2–3	Germany	21–25	21–25	25–19	25–19	11–15	103–103	P2 Report
1 Jun	16:00	Italy	3–0	Germany	25–21	30–28	25–23			80–72	P2 Report
1 Jun	20:00	China	0–3	Iran	22–25	18–25	21–25			61–75	P2 Report
2 Jun	16:00	Germany	0–3	Iran	28–30	27–29	20–25			75–84	P2 Report
2 Jun	20:00	China	0–3	Italy	21–25	13–25	24–26			58–76	P2 Report

==== Pool 2 ====
- All times are Argentina Time (UTC−03:00).

Date	Time		Score		Set 1	Set 2	Set 3	Set 4	Set 5	Total	Report
31 May	18:10	Canada	1–3	Bulgaria	20–25	24–26	25–19	17–25		86–95	P2 Report
31 May	21:10	Argentina	3–0	Portugal	25–17	25–21	25–21			75–59	P2 Report
1 Jun	18:10	Canada	3–0	Portugal	25–20	25–23	25–16			75–59	P2 Report
1 Jun	21:10	Argentina	3–0	Bulgaria	25–16	25–21	25–23			75–60	P2 Report
2 Jun	16:10	Portugal	3–1	Bulgaria	25–21	19–25	28–26	25–23		97–95	P2 Report
2 Jun	19:10	Argentina	1–3	Canada	21–25	27–29	25–16	24–26		97–96	P2 Report

==== Pool 3 ====
- All times are Central European Summer Time (UTC+02:00).

Date	Time		Score		Set 1	Set 2	Set 3	Set 4	Set 5	Total	Report
31 May	17:30	United States	0–3	Brazil	22–25	22–25	23–25			67–75	P2 Report
31 May	20:30	Poland	3–1	Australia	25–15	24–26	25–21	25–14		99–76	P2 Report
1 Jun	14:00	Brazil	3–2	Australia	32–34	25–16	25–19	27–29	15–13	124–111	P2 Report
1 Jun	17:40	United States	2–3	Poland	25–17	32–34	28–26	23–25	9–15	117–117	P2 Report
2 Jun	14:00	Australia	1–3	United States	25–19	25–27	16–25	16–25		82–96	P2 Report
2 Jun	17:00	Brazil	3–1	Poland	22–25	25–15	25–21	25–17		97–78	P2 Report

==== Pool 4 ====
- All times are Central European Summer Time (UTC+02:00).

Date	Time		Score		Set 1	Set 2	Set 3	Set 4	Set 5	Total	Report
31 May	17:00	Serbia	1–3	Japan	17–25	12–25	26–24	17–25		72–99	P2 Report
31 May	20:15	France	3–1	Russia	25–19	25–22	20–25	25–23		95–89	P2 Report
1 Jun	16:00	Japan	1–3	Russia	22–25	25–23	19–25	23–25		89–98	P2 Report
1 Jun	19:15	Serbia	1–3	France	12–25	22–25	25–20	20–25		79–95	P2 Report
2 Jun	16:00	Japan	1–3	France	22–25	27–25	19–25	15–25		83–100	P2 Report
2 Jun	19:00	Russia	3–2	Serbia	20–25	26–24	25–23	22–25	15–10	108–107	P2 Report

=== Week 2 ===
==== Pool 5 ====
- All times are China Standard Time (UTC+08:00).

Date	Time		Score		Set 1	Set 2	Set 3	Set 4	Set 5	Total	Report
7 Jun	16:00	France	3–1	Poland	28–26	25–23	24–26	25–20		102–95	P2 Report
7 Jun	19:30	China	3–0	Bulgaria	26–24	25–20	25–17			76–61	P2 Report
8 Jun	16:00	Poland	3–1	Bulgaria	22–25	25–19	27–25	25–20		99–89	P2 Report
8 Jun	19:30	China	0–3	France	16–25	23–25	20–25			59–75	P2 Report
9 Jun	16:00	Bulgaria	3–2	France	18–25	23–25	25–21	25–23	15–11	106–105	P2 Report
9 Jun	19:15	China	0–3	Poland	22–25	13–25	15–25			50–75	P2 Report

==== Pool 6 ====
- All times are Yekaterinburg Time (UTC+05:00).

Date	Time		Score		Set 1	Set 2	Set 3	Set 4	Set 5	Total	Report
7 Jun	16:00	Italy	3–1	United States	25–23	13–25	25–20	25–23		88–91	P2 Report
7 Jun	19:10	Russia	3–0	Portugal	25–19	25–22	25–20			75–61	P2 Report
8 Jun	16:00	Italy	3–0	Portugal	25–13	25–20	25–11			75–44	P2 Report
8 Jun	19:00	Russia	3–0	United States	25–22	25–19	25–15			75–56	P2 Report
9 Jun	16:00	Portugal	1–3	United States	20–25	25–22	22–25	17–25		84–97	P2 Report
9 Jun	19:00	Russia	3–0	Italy	29–27	25–16	25–18			79–61	P2 Report

==== Pool 7 ====
- All times are Japan Standard Time (UTC+09:00).

Date	Time		Score		Set 1	Set 2	Set 3	Set 4	Set 5	Total	Report
7 Jun	15:40	Brazil	3–2	Iran	23–25	25–16	21–25	33–31	15–10	117–107	P2 Report
7 Jun	19:10	Japan	3–0	Argentina	25–16	25–16	33–31			83–63	P2 Report
8 Jun	15:10	Argentina	1–3	Iran	19–25	25–20	22–25	32–34		98–104	P2 Report
8 Jun	18:40	Japan	0–3	Brazil	22–25	19–25	21–25			62–75	P2 Report
9 Jun	15:10	Argentina	2–3	Brazil	20–25	25–21	28–26	23–25	12–15	108–112	P2 Report
9 Jun	18:40	Japan	0–3	Iran	22–25	21–25	19–25			62–75	P2 Report

==== Pool 8 ====
- All times are Eastern Daylight Time (UTC−04:00).

Date	Time		Score		Set 1	Set 2	Set 3	Set 4	Set 5	Total	Report
7 Jun	16:40	Germany	3–2	Serbia	25–20	16–25	26–28	26–24	15–9	108–106	P2 Report
7 Jun	20:06	Canada	3–0	Australia	25–23	25–17	25–18			75–58	P2 Report
8 Jun	16:10	Serbia	3–2	Australia	22–25	14–25	25–21	25–21	15–9	101–101	P2 Report
8 Jun	19:15	Canada	3–2	Germany	23–25	29–27	25–18	23–25	15–12	115–107	P2 Report
9 Jun	13:10	Australia	3–0	Germany	25–20	25–20	25–16			75–56	P2 Report
9 Jun	16:10	Canada	2–3	Serbia	17–25	26–24	21–25	28–26	12–15	104–115	P2 Report

=== Week 3 ===
==== Pool 9 ====
- All times are Western European Summer Time (UTC+01:00).

Date	Time		Score		Set 1	Set 2	Set 3	Set 4	Set 5	Total	Report
14 Jun	18:00	Brazil	2–3	Serbia	25–17	22–25	25–17	20–25	12–15	104–99	P2 Report
14 Jun	21:15	Portugal	3–0	China	25–22	25–17	25–23			75–62	P2 Report
15 Jun	16:00	Brazil	3–0	China	25–15	25–18	25–22			75–55	P2 Report
15 Jun	19:00	Portugal	2–3	Serbia	25–21	15–25	22–25	32–30	9–15	103–116	P2 Report
16 Jun	15:00	China	1–3	Serbia	17–25	22–25	27–25	18–25		84–100	P2 Report
16 Jun	18:00	Portugal	0–3	Brazil	19–25	21–25	18–25			58–75	P2 Report

==== Pool 10 ====
- All times are Eastern European Summer Time (UTC+03:00).

Date	Time		Score		Set 1	Set 2	Set 3	Set 4	Set 5	Total	Report
14 Jun	17:00	Japan	1–3	Italy	25–23	15–25	27–29	21–25		88–102	P2 Report
14 Jun	20:40	Bulgaria	3–2	Australia	20–25	29–27	22–25	25–21	15–13	111–111	P2 Report
15 Jun	17:00	Australia	1–3	Italy	18–25	32–30	18–25	15–25		83–105	P2 Report
15 Jun	20:40	Bulgaria	2–3	Japan	25–22	19–25	25–16	19–25	19–21	107–109	P2 Report
16 Jun	17:00	Japan	3–2	Australia	25–18	25–27	23–25	25–22	17–15	115–107	P2 Report
16 Jun	20:40	Italy	3–1	Bulgaria	25–14	25–20	23–25	25–21		98–80	P2 Report

==== Pool 11 ====
- All times are Iran Daylight Time (UTC+04:30).

Date	Time		Score		Set 1	Set 2	Set 3	Set 4	Set 5	Total	Report
14 Jun	15:30	Russia	3–1	Poland	24–26	25–20	25–22	25–19		99–87	P2 Report
14 Jun	18:45	Iran	3–0	Canada	25–15	26–24	25–16			76–55	P2 Report
15 Jun	15:30	Russia	3–1	Canada	25–23	22–25	25–20	25–23		97–91	P2 Report
15 Jun	18:40	Iran	3–2	Poland	25–20	21–25	18–25	25–17	15–8	104–95	P2 Report
16 Jun	15:30	Poland	3–1	Canada	25–20	25–27	25–20	28–26		103–93	P2 Report
16 Jun	18:45	Iran	3–0	Russia	25–20	26–24	25–23			76–67	P2 Report

==== Pool 12 ====
- All times are Central European Summer Time (UTC+02:00).

Date	Time		Score		Set 1	Set 2	Set 3	Set 4	Set 5	Total	Report
14 Jun	17:00	United States	3–1	Argentina	25–22	25–19	21–25	25–21		96–87	P2 Report
14 Jun	20:15	France	3–1	Germany	24–26	25–20	25–19	25–20		99–85	P2 Report
15 Jun	17:00	United States	3–1	Germany	25–22	21–25	25–19	25–20		96–86	P2 Report
15 Jun	20:03	France	1–3	Argentina	18–25	17–25	25–19	20–25		80–94	P2 Report
16 Jun	14:00	Argentina	3–2	Germany	25–19	23–25	23–25	25–23	15–10	111–102	P2 Report
16 Jun	17:35	France	1–3	United States	25–23	22–25	26–28	25–27		98–103	P2 Report

=== Week 4 ===
==== Pool 13 ====
- All times are Central Daylight Time (UTC−05:00).

Date	Time		Score		Set 1	Set 2	Set 3	Set 4	Set 5	Total	Report
21 Jun	17:00	Canada	3–1	China	25–19	25–23	22–25	25–17		97–84	P2 Report
21 Jun	20:10	United States	3–0	Japan	25–15	25–19	25–19			75–53	P2 Report
22 Jun	14:00	China	0–3	Japan	19–25	20–25	23–25			62–75	P2 Report
22 Jun	19:30	United States	1–3	Canada	22–25	25–22	23–25	17–25		87–97	P2 Report
23 Jun	12:00	Canada	3–2	Japan	25–18	26–24	23–25	21–25	15–13	110–105	P2 Report
23 Jun	16:30	United States	3–0	China	25–20	25–19	25–19			75–58	P2 Report

==== Pool 14 ====
- All times are Central European Summer Time (UTC+02:00).

Date	Time		Score		Set 1	Set 2	Set 3	Set 4	Set 5	Total	Report
21 Jun	17:00	Poland	3–2	Argentina	25–21	25–23	25–27	20–25	19–17	114–113	P2 Report
21 Jun	20:20	Italy	3–0	Serbia	26–24	25–19	25–22			76–65	P2 Report
22 Jun	17:00	Poland	3–2	Serbia	32–30	21–25	25–21	19–25	15–11	112–112	P2 Report
22 Jun	20:10	Italy	1–3	Argentina	22–25	25–23	19–25	19–25		85–98	P2 Report
23 Jun	17:00	Argentina	3–0	Serbia	25–17	25–23	25–18			75–58	P2 Report
23 Jun	20:00	Italy	2–3	Poland	25–23	22–25	25–23	21–25	23–25	116–121	P2 Report

==== Pool 15 ====
- All times are Iran Daylight Time (UTC+04:30).

Date	Time		Score		Set 1	Set 2	Set 3	Set 4	Set 5	Total	Report
21 Jun	15:30	France	3–0	Australia	25–23	25–22	25–22			75–67	P2 Report
21 Jun	18:30	Iran	3–1	Portugal	23–25	27–25	25–17	25–18		100–85	P2 Report
22 Jun	15:30	France	3–0	Portugal	25–23	26–24	25–23			76–70	P2 Report
22 Jun	18:30	Iran	3–0	Australia	25–19	25–19	25–14			75–52	P2 Report
23 Jun	15:30	Portugal	0–3	Australia	23–25	22–25	25–27			70–77	P2 Report
23 Jun	18:30	Iran	0–3	France	18–25	24–26	21–25			63–76	P2 Report

==== Pool 16 ====
- All times are Amazon Time (UTC−04:00).

Date	Time		Score		Set 1	Set 2	Set 3	Set 4	Set 5	Total	Report
21 Jun	17:00	Germany	1–3	Russia	25–22	21–25	19–25	14–25		79–97	P2 Report
21 Jun	20:00	Brazil	3–1	Bulgaria	25–20	21–25	25–19	25–14		96–78	P2 Report
22 Jun	17:00	Bulgaria	0–3	Russia	20–25	20–25	21–25			61–75	P2 Report
22 Jun	20:00	Brazil	3–2	Germany	20–25	25–18	21–25	25–17	15–13	106–98	P2 Report
23 Jun	17:00	Germany	2–3	Bulgaria	28–26	25–18	23–25	19–25	10–15	105–109	P2 Report
23 Jun	20:20	Brazil	3–0	Russia	25–17	25–21	28–26			78–64	P2 Report

=== Week 5 ===
==== Pool 17 ====
- All times are Australian Eastern Standard Time (UTC+10:00).

Date	Time		Score		Set 1	Set 2	Set 3	Set 4	Set 5	Total	Report
28 Jun	17:00	China	1–3	Argentina	17–25	25–20	21–25	19–25		82–95	P2 Report
28 Jun	20:00	Australia	0–3	Russia	20–25	15–25	18–25			53–75	P2 Report
29 Jun	16:00	Argentina	2–3	Russia	19–25	25–22	18–25	25–21	11–15	98–108	P2 Report
29 Jun	19:00	Australia	3–1	China	24–26	25–15	25–22	25–18		99–81	P2 Report
30 Jun	13:00	China	0–3	Russia	23–25	23–25	26–28			72–78	P2 Report
30 Jun	16:00	Australia	0–3	Argentina	23–25	18–25	24–26			65–76	P2 Report

==== Pool 18 ====
- All times are Brasília Time (UTC−03:00).

Date	Time		Score		Set 1	Set 2	Set 3	Set 4	Set 5	Total	Report
28 Jun	17:00	Italy	1–3	Canada	25–15	20–25	22–25	18–25		85–90	P2 Report
28 Jun	20:00	Brazil	3–1	France	23–25	25–18	25–23	25–23		98–89	P2 Report
29 Jun	17:00	France	3–1	Italy	27–25	25–19	21–25	25–20		98–89	P2 Report
29 Jun	20:00	Brazil	3–0	Canada	25–20	25–19	25–19			75–58	P2 Report
30 Jun	16:00	Canada	0–3	France	22–25	26–28	23–25			71–78	P2 Report
30 Jun	19:00	Brazil	3–1	Italy	26–28	25–22	25–18	25–18		101–86	P2 Report

==== Pool 19 ====
- All times are Eastern European Summer Time (UTC+03:00).

Date	Time		Score		Set 1	Set 2	Set 3	Set 4	Set 5	Total	Report
28 Jun	17:00	Iran	3–1	Serbia	25–23	26–28	25–22	25–19		101–92	P2 Report
28 Jun	20:40	Bulgaria	3–1	United States	21–25	25–19	25–23	25–23		96–90	P2 Report
29 Jun	17:00	United States	3–1	Serbia	14–25	25–20	29–27	26–24		94–96	P2 Report
29 Jun	20:40	Bulgaria	0–3	Iran	23–25	23–25	21–25			67–75	P2 Report
30 Jun	17:00	Iran	0–3	United States	25–27	21–25	20–25			66–77	P2 Report
30 Jun	20:40	Serbia	3–0	Bulgaria	25–23	25–12	25–18			75–53	P2 Report

==== Pool 20 ====
- All times are Central European Summer Time (UTC+02:00).

Date	Time		Score		Set 1	Set 2	Set 3	Set 4	Set 5	Total	Report
28 Jun	17:30	Poland	3–1	Japan	22–25	25–19	27–25	25–20		99–89	P2 Report
28 Jun	20:30	Germany	3–1	Portugal	28–26	20–25	25–10	25–23		98–84	P2 Report
29 Jun	17:30	Germany	1–3	Poland	19–25	25–21	14–25	23–25		81–96	P2 Report
29 Jun	20:30	Portugal	1–3	Japan	20–25	22–25	25–22	20–25		87–97	P2 Report
30 Jun	14:00	Germany	2–3	Japan	17–25	25–23	25–21	18–25	9–15	94–109	P2 Report
30 Jun	17:10	Poland	3–0	Portugal	25–18	25–21	25–20			75–59	P2 Report

== Final round ==
- All times are Central Daylight Time (UTC−05:00).

=== Pool play ===
==== Pool A ====
Pos	Team	Pld	W	L	Pts	SW	SL	SR	SPW	SPL	SPR	Qualification
1	United States	2	2	0	6	6	1	6.000	173	142	1.218	Final four
2	Russia	2	1	1	3	3	3	1.000	133	131	1.015	Final four
3	France	2	0	2	0	1	6	0.167	140	173	0.809	

Source: VNL 2019 Pool A Standings

Date	Time		Score		Set 1	Set 2	Set 3	Set 4	Set 5	Total	Report
10 Jul	19:30	United States	3–1	France	25–16	25–22	23–25	25–21		98–84	P2 Report
11 Jul	20:00	Russia	3–0	France	25–16	25–23	25–17			75–56	P2 Report
12 Jul	20:00	United States	3–0	Russia	25–21	25–17	25–20			75–58	P2 Report

==== Pool B ====
Pos	Team	Pld	W	L	Pts	SW	SL	SR	SPW	SPL	SPR	Qualification
1	Poland	2	2	0	5	6	3	2.000	205	188	1.090	Final four
2	Brazil	2	1	1	3	5	5	1.000	212	213	0.995	Final four
3	Iran	2	0	2	1	3	6	0.500	189	205	0.922	

Source: VNL 2019 Pool B Standings

Date	Time		Score		Set 1	Set 2	Set 3	Set 4	Set 5	Total	Report
10 Jul	16:30	Brazil	2–3	Poland	23–25	25–23	21–25	25–21	9–15	103–109	P2 Report
11 Jul	17:00	Iran	1–3	Poland	25–21	18–25	20–25	22–25		85–96	P2 Report
12 Jul	17:00	Brazil	3–2	Iran	25–20	25–23	24–26	20–25	15–10	109–104	P2 Report

=== Final four ===
Semifinals
13 July
Poland	1
Russia	3
13 July
United States	3
Brazil	1

Final
14 July
Russia	3
United States	1
3rd place match
14 July
Poland	3
Brazil	0

==== Semifinals ====
Date	Time		Score		Set 1	Set 2	Set 3	Set 4	Set 5	Total	Report
13 Jul	17:00	Poland	1–3	Russia	19–25	26–24	22–25	21–25		88–99	P2 Report
13 Jul	20:00	United States	3–2	Brazil	25–21	17–25	21–25	25–20	15–9	103–100	P2 Report

==== 3rd place match ====
Date	Time		Score		Set 1	Set 2	Set 3	Set 4	Set 5	Total	Report
14 Jul	15:00	Poland	3–0	Brazil	25–17	25–23	25–21			75–61	P2 Report

==== Final ====
Date	Time		Score		Set 1	Set 2	Set 3	Set 4	Set 5	Total	Report
14 Jul	18:00	Russia	3–1	United States	25–23	20–25	25–21	25–20		95–89	P2 Report

== Final standing ==
Rank	Team
1st place, gold medalist(s)	Russia
2nd place, silver medalist(s)	United States
3rd place, bronze medalist(s)	Poland
4	Brazil
5	Iran
6	France
7	Italy
8	Canada
9	Argentina
10	Serbia
11	Japan
12	Bulgaria
13	Germany
14	Portugal
15	Australia
16	China

2019 Men's VNL champions

Russia
Second title

14-man roster
Dmitry Volkov, Egor Kliuka, Ivan Iakovlev, Viktor Poletaev, Ilyas Kurkaev, Dmitry Kovalev, Fedor Voronkov, Igor Kobzar (c), Denis Zemchenok, Anton Semyshev, Igor Filippov, Yaroslav Podlesnykh, Roman Martynyuk, Valentin Golubev
Head coach
Tuomas Sammelvuo

== Awards ==
- Most valuable player
  Matt Anderson (USA)
- Best setter
  Micah Christenson (USA)
- Best outside spikers
  Bartosz Bednorz (POL)
  Dmitry Volkov (RUS)
  Egor Kliuka (RUS)
- Best middle blockers
  Ivan Iakovlev (RUS)
  Maxwell Holt (USA)
- Best opposite spiker
  Matt Anderson (USA)
- Best libero
  Erik Shoji (USA)

== Statistics leaders ==
=== Preliminary round ===
Statistics leaders correct at the end of preliminary round.

Best Scorers
	Player	Attacks	Blocks	Serves	Total
1	(Iran) Amir Ghafour	214	21	14	249
2	(Japan) Yūji Nishida	183	13	23	219
3	(Brazil) Ricardo Lucarelli Souza	173	14	23	210
4	(Germany) Simon Hirsch	170	21	13	204
5	(Brazil) Yoandy Leal Hidalgo	161	22	19	202

Best Attackers
	Player	Spikes	Faults	Shots	Total	%
1	(Argentina) Bruno Lima	177	50	98	325	54.46
2	(Iran) Amir Ghafour	214	59	120	393	54.45
3	(Brazil) Ricardo Lucarelli	173	54	91	318	54.40
4	(Canada) Sharone Vernon-Evans	130	32	82	244	53.28
5	(Japan) Yūki Ishikawa	170	40	112	322	52.80

Best Blockers
	Player	Blocks	Faults	Rebounds	Total	Avg
1	(Canada) Graham Vigrass	31	63	65	159	0.53
2	(Iran) Mohammad Mousavi	32	79	56	167	0.52
3	(Russia) Ilyas Kurkaev	33	81	73	187	0.49
4	(Bulgaria) Svetoslav Gotsev	28	55	48	131	0.47
5	(Russia) Ivan Iakovlev	32	68	48	148	0.47

Best Servers
	Player	Aces	Faults	Hits	Total	Avg
1	(Russia) Egor Kliuka	28	37	107	172	0.41
2	(Japan) Yūji Nishida	23	41	124	188	0.39
3	(Brazil) Ricardo Lucarelli Souza	23	33	175	231	0.30
4	(Australia) Arshdeep Dosanjh	17	29	130	176	0.30
5	(Italy) Simone Giannelli	16	21	110	147	0.29

Best Setters
	Player	Running	Faults	Still	Total	Avg
1	(Iran) Saeid Marouf	529	17	688	1234	8.53
2	(Canada) Brett Walsh	443	13	758	1214	7.64
3	(Italy) Simone Giannelli	358	4	458	820	6.39
4	(Australia) Arshdeep Dosanjh	308	10	677	995	5.40
5	(Germany) Jan Zimmermann	336	6	699	1041	5.25

Best Diggers
	Player	Digs	Faults	Receptions	Total	Avg
1	(Argentina) Santiago Danani	143	57	45	245	2.42
2	(Italy) Fabio Balaso	121	35	41	197	2.16
3	(Australia) Luke Perry	122	46	44	212	2.14
4	(Germany) Julian Zenger	126	41	61	228	1.97
5	(France) Jenia Grebennikov	118	27	39	184	1.87

Best Receivers
	Player	Excellents	Faults	Serve	Total	%
1	(Brazil) Thales Hoss	104	23	231	358	22.63
2	(Portugal) Alexandre Ferreira	75	17	195	287	20.21
3	(Argentina) Santiago Danani	89	23	229	341	19.35
4	(United States) Garrett Muagututia	74	15	228	317	18.61
5	(Germany) Julian Zenger	73	19	222	314	17.20

=== Final round ===
Statistics leaders correct at the end of final round.

Best Scorers
	Player	Spikes	Blocks	Serves	Total
1	(Poland) Bartosz Bednorz	65	8	6	79
2	(United States) Matthew Anderson	50	3	4	57
3	(United States) Taylor Sander	46	2	5	53
4	(Brazil) Wallace De Souza	46	4	2	52
5	(Brazil) Ricardo Lucarelli Souza	38	1	10	49

Best Attackers
	Player	Spikes	Faults	Shots	Total	%
1	(United States) Taylor Sander	46	10	24	80	57.50
2	(Poland) Bartosz Bednorz	65	15	44	124	52.24
3	(Russia) Dmitry Volkov	31	10	20	61	50.82
4	(Iran) Milad Ebadipour	26	4	23	53	49.06
5	(United States) Matthew Anderson	50	19	33	102	49.02

Best Blockers
	Player	Blocks	Faults	Rebounds	Total	Avg
1	(United States) Maxwell Holt	17	19	17	53	1.06
2	(Russia) Ivan Iakovlev	13	17	20	50	0.93
3	(Iran) Mohammad Mousavi	8	15	16	39	0.89
4	(Poland) Norbert Huber	14	18	19	51	0.88
5	(Poland) Karol Kłos	13	25	18	56	0.81

Best Servers
	Player	Aces	Faults	Hits	Total	Avg
1	(Russia) Egor Kliuka	8	9	31	48	0.57
2	(Brazil) Ricardo Lucarelli Souza	10	10	46	56	0.56
3	(Poland) Bartosz Kwolek	7	9	44	60	0.44
4	(Poland) Karol Kłos	7	9	54	70	0.44
5	(France) Thibault Rossard	3	5	6	14	0.43

Best Setters
	Player	Running	Faults	Still	Total	Avg
1	(Iran) Saeid Marouf	71	3	129	203	7.89
2	(United States) Micah Christenson	101	1	191	293	6.31
3	(Poland) Marcin Komenda	92	2	197	291	5.75
4	(Brazil) Fernando Kreling	79	4	125	208	4.39
5	(Russia) Igor Kobzar	57	0	159	216	4.07

Best Diggers
	Player	Digs	Faults	Receptions	Total	Avg
1	(Iran) Saeid Marouf	24	5	8	37	2.67
2	(Poland) Jakub Popiwczak	29	11	12	52	1.81
3	(Iran) Mohammad Reza Hazratpour	16	6	7	29	1.78
4	(France) Nicolas Rossard	12	5	14	31	1.71
5	(Russia) Valentin Golubev	24	12	5	41	1.71

Best Receivers
	Player	Excellents	Faults	Serve	Total	%
1	(Brazil) Thales Hoss	27	6	73	106	19.81
2	(United States) Erik Shoji	13	2	46	61	18.03
3	(United States) Taylor Sander	19	7	48	74	16.22
4	(Russia) Valentin Golubev	16	5	58	79	13.92
5	(Poland) Bartosz Kwolek	19	6	88	113	11.50

== See also ==
- 2019 FIVB Volleyball Men's Challenger Cup
