= Blair Bann =

Canadian volleyball player (born 1988)

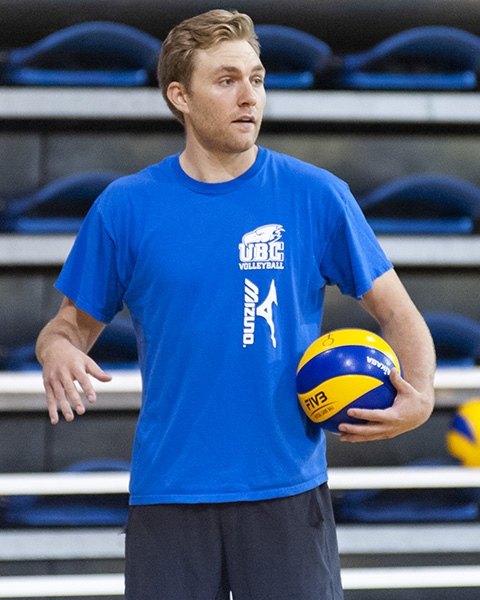

Personal information
- Full name: Blair Cameron Bann
- Born: 26 February 1988 (age 38); Edmonton, Alberta, Canada
- Hometown: Edmonton, Alberta, Canada
- Height: 184 cm (6 ft 0 in)
- Weight: 84 kg (185 lb)
- Spike: 314 cm (124 in)
- Block: 295 cm (116 in)
- Education: University of British Columbia

Volleyball information
- Position: Libero

Career
Years	Teams
2006–2011; 2011–2013; 2013–2014; 2014–2018; 2018–2019; 2019–2021; 2021–2023	UBC Thunderbirds; Düren; Nantes Rezé MV; Düren; Chaumont Volley-Ball 52; Düren; VfB Friedrichshafen

National team
2009–2021	Canada
Honours
Men's Volleyball
Representing Canada
FIVB World League
Bronze medal – third place	2017 Curitiba
NORCECA Championship
Gold medal – first place	2015 Mexico
Silver medal – second place	2013 Canada

Blair Cameron Bann (born 26 February 1988) is a former Canadian professional volleyball player. He was a member of the Canadian men's national volleyball team, a participant at two Olympic Games (Rio 2016, Tokyo 2020), and a bronze medallist at the 2017 World League.

== Personal life ==
Blair was born in Edmonton, Alberta to parents Robert and Gisele Bann. He started playing volleyball at the age of 14 for his school team, Ecole J.H. Picard, while playing for local club NAVC Gold during his high school years.

== Career ==
=== Club ===
After playing for the UBC Thunderbirds for 5 years, Blair signed with German club Düren in 2011. He has spent the majority of his career there, apart from a one-year stint at Nantes Rezé MV in the 2013–14 season.

=== National team ===
Blair first joined the national team in 2009. He has helped the team win gold and silver at the NORCECA Men's Volleyball Championship in 2015 and 2013, and was a member of the squad that finished 5th at the 2016 Summer Olympics. In June 2021, Bann was named to Canada's 2020 Olympic team.

== Sporting achievements ==
=== Club ===
- 2014/2015 Bundesliga, with Düren

=== National team ===
- 2013 NORCECA Championship
- 2015 NORCECA Championship
- 2017 FIVB World League

=== Individual ===
- 2009/2010 CIS Men's Volleyball Championship - Libero of the year
- 2010/2011 CIS Men's Volleyball Championship - Libero of the year
- 2011 Pan American Games - Best Digger
- 2013 NORCECA Championship - Best Receiver
- 2017 FIVB World League - Best Libero
