= Daniel Vargas (volleyball) =

Mexican volleyball player (born 1986)

Personal information
- Born: 1 September 1986 (age 40) Mexico City, Mexico
- Education: National Autonomous University of Mexico
- Height: 1.99 m (6 ft 6 in)
- Weight: 85 kg (187 lb)
- Spike: 340 cm (134 in)
- Block: 330 cm (130 in)

Volleyball information
- Current club: Iraklis Thessaloniki
- Number: 1

Career
- Years: Team
- 2014, 2016: (Mexico) Pumas UNAM

National team
- Years: Team
- 2014-: Mexico

Daniel Vargas OLY (born 1 September 1986) is a Mexican male volleyball player, a member of Mexico men's national volleyball team, where he played at the Olympic Games 2016 Rio, and at the 2014 FIVB Volleyball Men's World Championship in Poland. Before joining the national team, Daniel played for Pumas UNAM, while doing his masters and undergraduate studies in electrical engineering at the National Autonomous University of Mexico (UNAM).

== Career ==
During the summer of 2016, Vargas along with Mexico men's national volleyball team, ended their 48-year absence in the Olympic Games, when they secured the final place at stake for the Rio 2016 Olympic Games through the World Olympic Qualification Tournament, which took place in their home turf in Mexico City.

== Clubs ==
- Pumas UNAM (2014)
