= 2017–18 PGE Skra Bełchatów season =

PGE Skra Bełchatów
2017–18 season
- Chairman: Konrad Piechocki
- Manager: Roberto Piazza

PGE Skra Bełchatów 2017–2018 season is the 2017/2018 volleyball season for Polish professional volleyball club PGE Skra Bełchatów.

The club competes in:

- Polish SuperCup
- Polish Championship
- Polish Cup
- FIVB Club World Championship
- CEV Champions League

On May 5, 2018 PGE Skra Bełchatów beat ZAKSA Kędzierzyn-Koźle in second match of finals and achieved 9th Polish title.

== Team roster ==
Head coach:	Roberto Piazza
Assistant:	Michał Winiarski
Coach of physical preparation:	Wojciech Janas
Doctor:	Wojciech Łucarz
Physiotherapists:	Tomasz Kuciapiński, Tomasz Pieczko
Scoutman:	Robert Kaźmierczak
Managers:	Dominik Posmyk

No.	Name	Date of birth	Position
1	(Serbia) Srećko Lisinac	May 17, 1992 (age 32)	middle blocker
2	(Poland) Mariusz Wlazły (C)	August 4, 1983 (age 41)	opposite
5	(Poland) Marcin Janusz	July 31, 1994 (age 30)	setter
6	(Poland) Karol Kłos	August 8, 1989 (age 35)	middle blocker
7	(Poland) Bartosz Bednorz	July 25, 1994 (age 30)	outside hitter
8	(Serbia) Milan Katić	October 22, 1993 (age 31)	outside hitter
9	(Poland) Patryk Czarnowski	November 1, 1985 (age 39)	middle blocker
11	(Iran) Milad Ebadipour	October 17, 1993 (age 31)	outside hitter
13	(Poland) Szymon Romać	October 1, 1992 (age 32)	opposite
14	(Serbia) Aleksandar Nedeljković	October 27, 1997 (age 27)	middle blocker
15	(Poland) Grzegorz Łomacz	October 1, 1987 (age 37)	setter
16	(Poland) Kacper Piechocki	December 17, 1995 (age 29)	libero
17	(Bulgaria) Nikolay Penchev	May 22, 1992 (age 32)	outside hitter
18	(Poland) Robert Milczarek	November 28, 1983 (age 41)	libero

Players of PGE Skra Bełchatów on loan in season 2017/18:

Name	Date of birth	Position	Loaned to
(Bulgaria) Chono Penchev	December 11, 1994	setter	(Italy) Azimut Modena
(Bulgaria) Rozalin Penchev	December 11, 1994	outside hitter	(Argentina) Personal Bolívar

== Squad changes for the 2017–2018 season ==
In:

No.	Player	Position	From
	(Italy) Roberto Piazza	head coach	Azmiut Modena
8	(Serbia) Milan Katić	outside hitter	Łuczniczka Bydgoszcz
9	(Poland) Patryk Czarnowski	middle blocker	ZAKSA Kędzierzyn-Koźle
11	(Iran) Milad Ebadipour	outside hitter	Sarmayeh Bank Tehran
13	(Poland) Szymon Romać	opposite	Lotos Trefl Gdańsk
14	(Serbia) Aleksandar Nedeljković	middle blocker	OK Kosovska Mitrovica
15	(Poland) Grzegorz Łomacz	setter	Cuprum Lubin

Out:

No.	Player	Position	To
	(France) Philippe Blain	head coach	Japan men's national volleyball team
4	(Poland) Mariusz Marcyniak	middle blocker	Aluron Virtu Warta Zawiercie
5	(Poland) Bartosz Kurek	outside hitter	Ziraat Bankası Ankara
8	(Ukraine) Jurij Gladyr	middle blocker	Fenerbahçe Istanbul
10	(Argentina) Nicolás Uriarte	setter	Sada Cruzeiro
11	(Serbia) Mihajlo Stanković	outside hitter	Maliye Milli Piyango SK
12	(Poland) Artur Szalpuk	outside hitter	Lotos Trefl Gdańsk
13	(Poland) Michał Winiarski	outside hitter	retirement

== Most Valuable Players ==
No.	Player	MVP
1.	Mariusz Wlazły	5
2.	Srećko Lisinac	4
3.	Patryk Czarnowski	3
	Milad Ebadipour	3
5.	Bartosz Bednorz	1
	Kacper Piechocki	1
	Karol Kłos	1

== Results, schedules and standings ==
=== 2017 Polish SuperCup ===
On September 23, 2017 PGE Skra beat ZAKSA Kędzierzyn-Koźle and achieved their third Polish SuperCup in history. Bartosz Bednorz was awarded a title of the Most Valuable Player.

September 23, 2017; 19:00	ZAKSA Kędzierzyn-Koźle	1–3	PGE Skra Bełchatów	Energia Hall, Bełchatów; Referees: Niemczura Waldemar - Lagierski Marek
September 23, 2017; 19:00	(25–16, 17–25, 33–35, 21–25) MVP: Bartosz Bednorz			Energia Hall, Bełchatów; Referees: Niemczura Waldemar - Lagierski Marek

=== 2017–18 PlusLiga ===
==== Regular season ====
22 November 2017; 18:00	PGE Skra Bełchatów	3–0	Trefl Gdańsk	Energia Hall, Bełchatów; Attendance: 2,165; Referees: Wojciech Maroszek - Marek Lagierski
22 November 2017; 18:00	(25–23, 25–18, 25–20) MVP: Milad Ebadipour			Energia Hall, Bełchatów; Attendance: 2,165; Referees: Wojciech Maroszek - Marek Lagierski

15 November 2017; 20:30	PGE Skra Bełchatów	3–0	Aluron Virtu Warta Zawiercie	Energia Hall, Bełchatów; Attendance: 1,941; Referees: Marcin Herbik - Tomasz Janik
15 November 2017; 20:30	(25–23, 29–27, 25–21) MVP: Milad Ebadipour			Energia Hall, Bełchatów; Attendance: 1,941; Referees: Marcin Herbik - Tomasz Janik

8 October 2017; 12:30	Jastrzębski Węgiel	3–1	PGE Skra Bełchatów	HWS, Jastrzębie-Zdrój; Attendance: 3,015; Referees: Paweł Burkiewicz - Tomasz Flis
8 October 2017; 12:30	(25–21, 23–25, 27–25, 25–20) MVP: Salvador Hidalgo Oliva			HWS, Jastrzębie-Zdrój; Attendance: 3,015; Referees: Paweł Burkiewicz - Tomasz Flis

14 October 2017; 14:45	PGE Skra Bełchatów	3–0	Asseco Resovia Rzeszów	Energia Hall, Bełchatów; Attendance: 2,234; Referees: Maciej Twardowski - Szymon Pindral
14 October 2017; 14:45	(25–17, 25–17, 25–23) MVP: Srećko Lisinac			Energia Hall, Bełchatów; Attendance: 2,234; Referees: Maciej Twardowski - Szymon Pindral

18 October 2017; 18:00	Indykpol AZS Olsztyn	3–2	PGE Skra Bełchatów	Urania Hall, Olsztyn; Attendance: 2,190; Referees: Marek Heyducki - Piotr Skowroński
18 October 2017; 18:00	(18–25, 25–21, 25–23, 28–30, 15–12) MVP: Jan Hadrava			Urania Hall, Olsztyn; Attendance: 2,190; Referees: Marek Heyducki - Piotr Skowroński

20 October 2017; 18:00	PGE Skra Bełchatów	3–0	Cuprum Lubin	Energia Hall, Bełchatów; Attendance: 1,938; Referees: Maciej Maciejewski - Jarosław Makowski
20 October 2017; 18:00	(25–22, 25–22, 26–24) MVP: Mariusz Wlazły			Energia Hall, Bełchatów; Attendance: 1,938; Referees: Maciej Maciejewski - Jarosław Makowski

27 October 2017; 18:00	Cerrad Czarni Radom	2–3	PGE Skra Bełchatów	Hala MOSiR, Radom; Attendance: 1,500; Referees: Wojciech Maroszek - Marek Lagierski
27 October 2017; 18:00	(25–21, 25–18, 20–25, 21–25, 12–15) MVP: Mariusz Wlazły			Hala MOSiR, Radom; Attendance: 1,500; Referees: Wojciech Maroszek - Marek Lagierski

4 November 2017; 15:00	PGE Skra Bełchatów	3–0	Łuczniczka Bydgoszcz	Energia Hall, Bełchatów; Attendance: 2,326; Referees: Szymon Pindral - Maciej Twardowski
4 November 2017; 15:00	(25–22, 25–16, 25–22) MVP: Patryk Czarnowski			Energia Hall, Bełchatów; Attendance: 2,326; Referees: Szymon Pindral - Maciej Twardowski

9 November 2017; 18:00	PGE Skra Bełchatów	3–0	ONICO Warsaw	Energia Hall, Bełchatów; Attendance: 2,217; Referees: Paweł Burkiewicz - Maciej Kolendowski
9 November 2017; 18:00	(26–24, 25–22, 28–26) MVP: Srećko Lisinac			Energia Hall, Bełchatów; Attendance: 2,217; Referees: Paweł Burkiewicz - Maciej Kolendowski

18 November 2017; 15:00	PGE Skra Bełchatów	3–0	GKS Katowice	Energia Hall, Bełchatów; Attendance: 2,331; Referees: Sławomir Gołąbek - Waldemar Kobienia
18 November 2017; 15:00	(25–22, 25–22, 25–22) MVP: Patryk Czarnowski			Energia Hall, Bełchatów; Attendance: 2,331; Referees: Sławomir Gołąbek - Waldemar Kobienia

25 November 2017; 18:00	MKS Będzin	0–3	PGE Skra Bełchatów	HWS, Sosnowiec; Attendance: 1,400; Referees: Szymon Pindral - Magdalena Niewiarowska
25 November 2017; 18:00	(17–25, 14–25, 21–25) MVP: Bartosz Bednorz			HWS, Sosnowiec; Attendance: 1,400; Referees: Szymon Pindral - Magdalena Niewiarowska

2 December 2017; 15:00	PGE Skra Bełchatów	3–1	Espadon Szczecin	Energia Hall, Bełchatów; Attendance: 2,279; Referees: Waldemar Kobienia - Paweł Ignatowicz
2 December 2017; 15:00	(25–16, 25–22, 23–25, 25–21) MVP: Kacper Piechocki			Energia Hall, Bełchatów; Attendance: 2,279; Referees: Waldemar Kobienia - Paweł Ignatowicz

9 December 2017; 18:00	PGE Skra Bełchatów	3–0	Dafi Społem Kielce	Energia Hall, Bełchatów; Attendance: 1,232; Referees: Tomasz Flis - Mariusz Gadzina
9 December 2017; 18:00	(25–15, 27–25, 25–19) MVP: Patryk Czarnowski			Energia Hall, Bełchatów; Attendance: 1,232; Referees: Tomasz Flis - Mariusz Gadzina

22 December 2017; 18:00	PGE Skra Bełchatów	3–0	BBTS Bielsko-Biała	Energia Hall, Bełchatów; Attendance: 1,797; Referees: Piotr Skowroński - Marek Heyducki
22 December 2017; 18:00	(25–20, 26–24, 25–21) MVP: Srećko Lisinac			Energia Hall, Bełchatów; Attendance: 1,797; Referees: Piotr Skowroński - Marek Heyducki

30 December 2017; 14:45	ZAKSA Kędzierzyn-Koźle	3–1	PGE Skra Bełchatów	Azoty Hall, Kędzierzyn-Koźle; Attendance: 3,000; Referees: Piotr Król - Waldemar Niemczura
30 December 2017; 14:45	(25–20, 25–21, 20–25, 25–20) MVP: Paweł Zatorski			Azoty Hall, Kędzierzyn-Koźle; Attendance: 3,000; Referees: Piotr Król - Waldemar Niemczura

5 January 2018; 18:00	Trefl Gdańsk	1–3	PGE Skra Bełchatów	Ergo Arena, Gdańsk; Attendance: 5,500; Referees: Magdalena Niewiarowska - Marcin Herbik
5 January 2018; 18:00	(28–26, 25–27, 21–25, 24–26) MVP: Mariusz Wlazły			Ergo Arena, Gdańsk; Attendance: 5,500; Referees: Magdalena Niewiarowska - Marcin Herbik

14 January 2018; 14:45	Aluron Virtu Warta Zawiercie	3–0	PGE Skra Bełchatów	HWS, Zawiercie; Attendance: 1,500; Referees: Maciej Kolendowski - Paweł Burkiewicz
14 January 2018; 14:45	(26–24, 25–21, 25–19) MVP: Grzegorz Bociek			HWS, Zawiercie; Attendance: 1,500; Referees: Maciej Kolendowski - Paweł Burkiewicz

21 January 2018; 14:45	PGE Skra Bełchatów	2–3	Jastrzębski Węgiel	Energia Hall, Bełchatów; Attendance: 2,463; Referees: Szymon Pindral - Maciej Twardowski
21 January 2018; 14:45	(25–22, 16–25, 25–18, 21–25, 10–15) MVP: Maciej Muzaj			Energia Hall, Bełchatów; Attendance: 2,463; Referees: Szymon Pindral - Maciej Twardowski

4 February 2018; 14:45	Asseco Resovia Rzeszów	2–3	PGE Skra Bełchatów	Podpromie Hall, Rzeszów; Attendance: 4,304; Referees: Marcin Herbik - Tomasz Janik
4 February 2018; 14:45	(23–25, 25–15, 26–24, 24–26, 10–15) MVP: Mariusz Wlazły			Podpromie Hall, Rzeszów; Attendance: 4,304; Referees: Marcin Herbik - Tomasz Janik

9 February 2018; 18:00	PGE Skra Bełchatów	3–2	Indykpol AZS Olsztyn	Energia Hall, Bełchatów; Attendance: 2,044; Referees: Marek Heyducki - Piotr Skowroński
9 February 2018; 18:00	(18–25, 23–25, 25–22, 25–14, 18–16) MVP: Srećko Lisinac			Energia Hall, Bełchatów; Attendance: 2,044; Referees: Marek Heyducki - Piotr Skowroński

17 February 2018; 14:45	Cuprum Lubin	0–3	PGE Skra Bełchatów	HWS, Lubin; Attendance: 2,806; Referees: Piotr Król - Wojciech Maroszek
17 February 2018; 14:45	(20–25, 15–25, 23–25) MVP: Mariusz Wlazły			HWS, Lubin; Attendance: 2,806; Referees: Piotr Król - Wojciech Maroszek

25 February 2018; 18:00	PGE Skra Bełchatów	3–2	Cerrad Czarni Radom	Energia Hall, Bełchatów; Attendance: 2,345; Referees: Szymon Pindral - Mariusz Gadzina
25 February 2018; 18:00	(25–23, 18–25, 18–25, 25–22, 15–12) MVP: Milad Ebadipour			Energia Hall, Bełchatów; Attendance: 2,345; Referees: Szymon Pindral - Mariusz Gadzina

3 March 2018; 15:00	Łuczniczka Bydgoszcz	0–3	PGE Skra Bełchatów	Łuczniczka, Bydgoszcz; Attendance: 4,150; Referees: Maciej Maciejewski - Marek Heyducki
3 March 2018; 15:00	(20–25, 21–25, 17–25) MVP: Karol Kłos			Łuczniczka, Bydgoszcz; Attendance: 4,150; Referees: Maciej Maciejewski - Marek Heyducki

{{{date}}}	ONICO Warsaw	–	PGE Skra Bełchatów	Torwar Hall, Warsaw
{{{date}}}	MVP:			Torwar Hall, Warsaw

9 March 2018; 18:00	GKS Katowice	–	PGE Skra Bełchatów	Spodek, Katowice
9 March 2018; 18:00	MVP:			Spodek, Katowice

17 March 2018	PGE Skra Bełchatów	–	MKS Będzin	Energia Hall, Bełchatów
17 March 2018	MVP:			Energia Hall, Bełchatów

24 March 2018	Espadon Szczecin	–	PGE Skra Bełchatów	Azoty Arena, Szczecin
24 March 2018	MVP:			Azoty Arena, Szczecin

30 March 2018	Dafi Społem Kielce	–	PGE Skra Bełchatów	Legionów Hall, Kielce
30 March 2018	MVP:			Legionów Hall, Kielce

7 April 2018	BBTS Bielsko-Biała	–	PGE Skra Bełchatów	Dębowiec Sports Arena, Bielsko-Biała
7 April 2018	MVP:			Dębowiec Sports Arena, Bielsko-Biała

14 April 2018	PGE Skra Bełchatów	–	ZAKSA Kędzierzyn-Koźle	Energia Hall, Bełchatów
14 April 2018	MVP:			Energia Hall, Bełchatów

=== 2017–18 Polish Cup ===
==== Quarterfinal ====
10 January 2017; 18:00	PGE Skra Bełchatów	3–0	Asseco Resovia Rzeszów	Energia Hall, Bełchatów; Attendance: 1,625; Referees: Ignatowicz Paweł - Kobienia Waldemar
10 January 2017; 18:00	(26–24, 25–20, 25–17) MVP: Bartosz Bednorz			Energia Hall, Bełchatów; Attendance: 1,625; Referees: Ignatowicz Paweł - Kobienia Waldemar

==== Semifinal ====
27 January 2017; 18:00	ONICO Warsaw	0–3	PGE Skra Bełchatów	Centennial Hall, Wrocław; Attendance: 3,200; Referees: Maroszek Wojciech - Broński Jacek
27 January 2017; 18:00	(19–25, 19–25, 24–26) MVP: Marcin Janusz			Centennial Hall, Wrocław; Attendance: 3,200; Referees: Maroszek Wojciech - Broński Jacek

==== Final ====
28 January 2017; 14:45	Trefl Gdańsk	3–0	PGE Skra Bełchatów	Centennial Hall, Wrocław; Attendance: 4,220; Referees: Burkiewicz Paweł - Pindral Szymon
28 January 2017; 14:45	(25–21, 25–22, 25–22) MVP: Damian Schulz			Centennial Hall, Wrocław; Attendance: 4,220; Referees: Burkiewicz Paweł - Pindral Szymon

=== 2017 FIVB Club World Championship ===
==== Pool B ====
12 December 2017; 20:30	PGE Skra Bełchatów (Poland)	3–0	(China) Shanghai Golden Age	Atlas Arena, Łódź; Attendance: 2,665; Referees: Mokry Juraj (SVK) & McLean Scott (CAN)
12 December 2017; 20:30	(25–18, 25–19, 25–21); P2 P3			Atlas Arena, Łódź; Attendance: 2,665; Referees: Mokry Juraj (SVK) & McLean Scott (CAN)

13 December 2017; 20:30	PGE Skra Bełchatów (Poland)	3–1	(Argentina) Personal Bolívar	Atlas Arena, Łódź; Attendance: 3,726; Referees: McLean Scott (CAN) & Cespedes Denny (DOM)
13 December 2017; 20:30	(23–25, 25–15, 25–21, 25–19); P2 P3			Atlas Arena, Łódź; Attendance: 3,726; Referees: McLean Scott (CAN) & Cespedes Denny (DOM)

14 December 2017; 20:30	PGE Skra Bełchatów (Poland)	0–3	(Russia) Zenit Kazan	Atlas Arena, Łódź; Attendance: 6,054; Referees: Mokry Juraj (SVK) & Cespedes Denny (DOM)
14 December 2017; 20:30	(27–29, 20–25, 16–25); P2 P3			Atlas Arena, Łódź; Attendance: 6,054; Referees: Mokry Juraj (SVK) & Cespedes Denny (DOM)

==== Semifinal ====
16 December 2017; 20:30	Cucine Lube Civitanova (Italy)	3–0	(Poland) PGE Skra Bełchatów	Tauron Arena Kraków, Kraków; Attendance: 4,013; Referees: Mokry J. (SVK) & Shaaban N. (EGY)
16 December 2017; 20:30	(25–23, 25–23, 25–23); P2 P3			Tauron Arena Kraków, Kraków; Attendance: 4,013; Referees: Mokry J. (SVK) & Shaaban N. (EGY)

==== 3rd place match ====
17 December 2017; 17:30	PGE Skra Bełchatów (Poland)	0–3	(Brazil) Sada Cruzeiro	Tauron Arena Kraków, Kraków; Attendance: 4,500; Referees: Shaaban N. (EGY) & Cespedes D. (DOM)
17 December 2017; 17:30	(19–25, 18–25, 13–25); P2 P3			Tauron Arena Kraków, Kraków; Attendance: 4,500; Referees: Shaaban N. (EGY) & Cespedes D. (DOM)

=== 2017–18 CEV Champions League ===
==== Pool C ====
6 December 2017; 18:00	PGE Skra Bełchatów (Poland)	1–3	(France) Chaumont VB 52 Haute Marne	Energia Hall, Bełchatów; Attendance: 1,820; Referees: KOZLOVSKYY Viktor - SZABO Peter
6 December 2017; 18:00	(25–19, 18–25, 19–25, 27–29)			Energia Hall, Bełchatów; Attendance: 1,820; Referees: KOZLOVSKYY Viktor - SZABO Peter

20 December 2017; 19:30	Lokomotiv Novosibirsk (Russia)	3–0	(Poland) PGE Skra Bełchatów	SKK Sever, Novosibirsk; Attendance: 800; Referees: CESARE Stefano - SIMONOVSKA Sonja
20 December 2017; 19:30	(25–18, 25–18, 25–19)			SKK Sever, Novosibirsk; Attendance: 800; Referees: CESARE Stefano - SIMONOVSKA Sonja

17 January 2018; 19:00	Dinamo Moscow (Russia)	2–3	(Poland) PGE Skra Bełchatów	Dynamo Sports Palace, Moscow; Attendance: 3,000; Referees: GRIEDER Stephan - KOUTSOULAS Michail
17 January 2018; 19:00	(15–25, 25–23, 20–25, 25–23, 12–15)			Dynamo Sports Palace, Moscow; Attendance: 3,000; Referees: GRIEDER Stephan - KOUTSOULAS Michail

31 January 2018; 18:00	PGE Skra Bełchatów (Poland)	3–1	(Russia) Dinamo Moscow	Atlas Arena, Łódź; Attendance: 9,500; Referees: AKINCI Erdal - RODRIGUEZ JATIVA Susana Maria
31 January 2018; 18:00	(25–23, 22–25, 25–22, 25–13)			Atlas Arena, Łódź; Attendance: 9,500; Referees: AKINCI Erdal - RODRIGUEZ JATIVA Susana Maria

13 February 2018; 18:00	PGE Skra Bełchatów (Poland)	3–0	(Russia) Lokomotiv Novosibirsk	Energia Hall, Bełchatów; Attendance: 2,180; Referees: SZABO-ALEXI Paul Catalin - MARKELJ Blaz
13 February 2018; 18:00	(25–19, 25–15, 25–19)			Energia Hall, Bełchatów; Attendance: 2,180; Referees: SZABO-ALEXI Paul Catalin - MARKELJ Blaz

28 February 2018; 20:30	Chaumont VB 52 Haute Marne (France)	3–2	(Poland) PGE Skra Bełchatów	Complexe René-Tys, Reims; Attendance: 1,652; Referees: PORVAZNIK Igor - OZBAR Nurper
28 February 2018; 20:30	(25–22, 25–19, 20–25, 22–25, 16–14)			Complexe René-Tys, Reims; Attendance: 1,652; Referees: PORVAZNIK Igor - OZBAR Nurper

==== Playoff 12 ====
The draws of the match pairs for the playoffs of 12 were held on March 2, 2018 in Luxembourg. PGE Skra was one of three Polish teams in this phase.

{{{date}}}	PGE Skra Bełchatów (Poland)	–	(Italy) Cucine Lube Civitanova

{{{date}}}	Cucine Lube Civitanova (Italy)	–	(Poland) PGE Skra Bełchatów
