= Kacper Piechocki =

Polish volleyball player (born 1995)

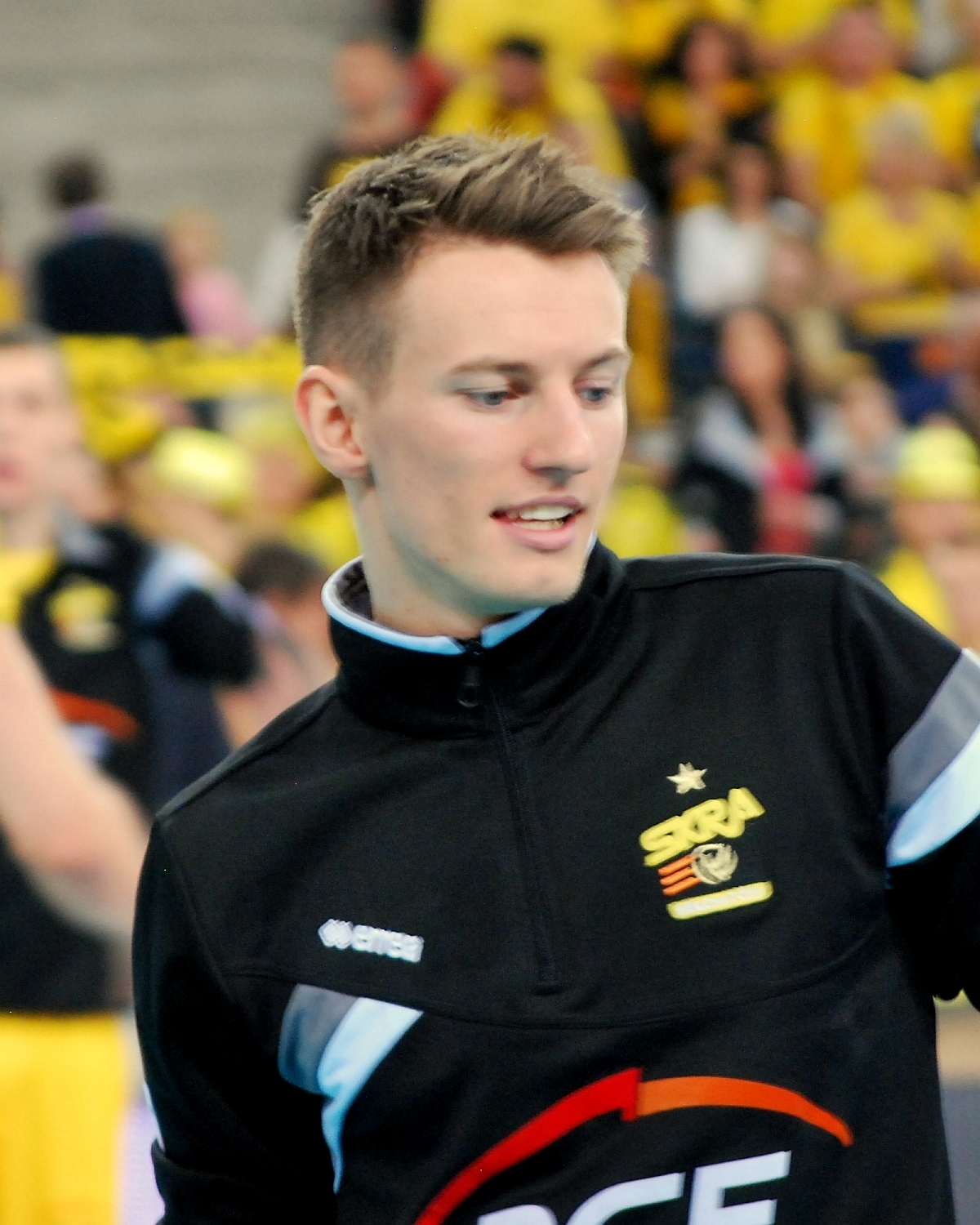

Personal information
- Nationality: Polish
- Born: 17 December 1995 (age 30); Bełchatów, Poland
- Height: 1.85 m (6 ft 1 in)
- Weight: 75 kg (165 lb)

Volleyball information
- Position: Libero

Career
Years	Teams
2012–2014; 2014–2023	AZS Częstochowa; Skra Bełchatów

Kacper Piechocki (born 17 December 1995) is a Polish professional volleyball player.

== Career ==
From 2012 to 2014, he was a player of AZS Częstochowa. In May 2014, he moved to PGE Skra Bełchatów. On 8 October 2014, his team won the Polish SuperCup. On 7 February 2016, alongside Skra, he won the Polish Cup after beating ZAKSA in the final. In April 2016, he was a member of the same team which won a bronze medal of the Polish Championship.

== Honours ==
=== Club ===
- Domestic
  - 2014–15 Polish SuperCup, with PGE Skra Bełchatów
  - 2015–16 Polish Cup, with PGE Skra Bełchatów
  - 2017–18 Polish SuperCup, with PGE Skra Bełchatów
  - 2017–18 Polish Championship, with PGE Skra Bełchatów
  - 2018–19 Polish SuperCup, with PGE Skra Bełchatów

=== Youth national team ===
- 2013 CEV U19 European Championship
- 2013 European Youth Olympic Festival
- 2014 CEV U20 European Championship

=== Individual awards ===
- 2013: CEV U19 European Championship – Best libero
- 2014: CEV U20 European Championship – Best libero
