= Aleksandar Nedeljković =

Serbian volleyball player (born 1997)

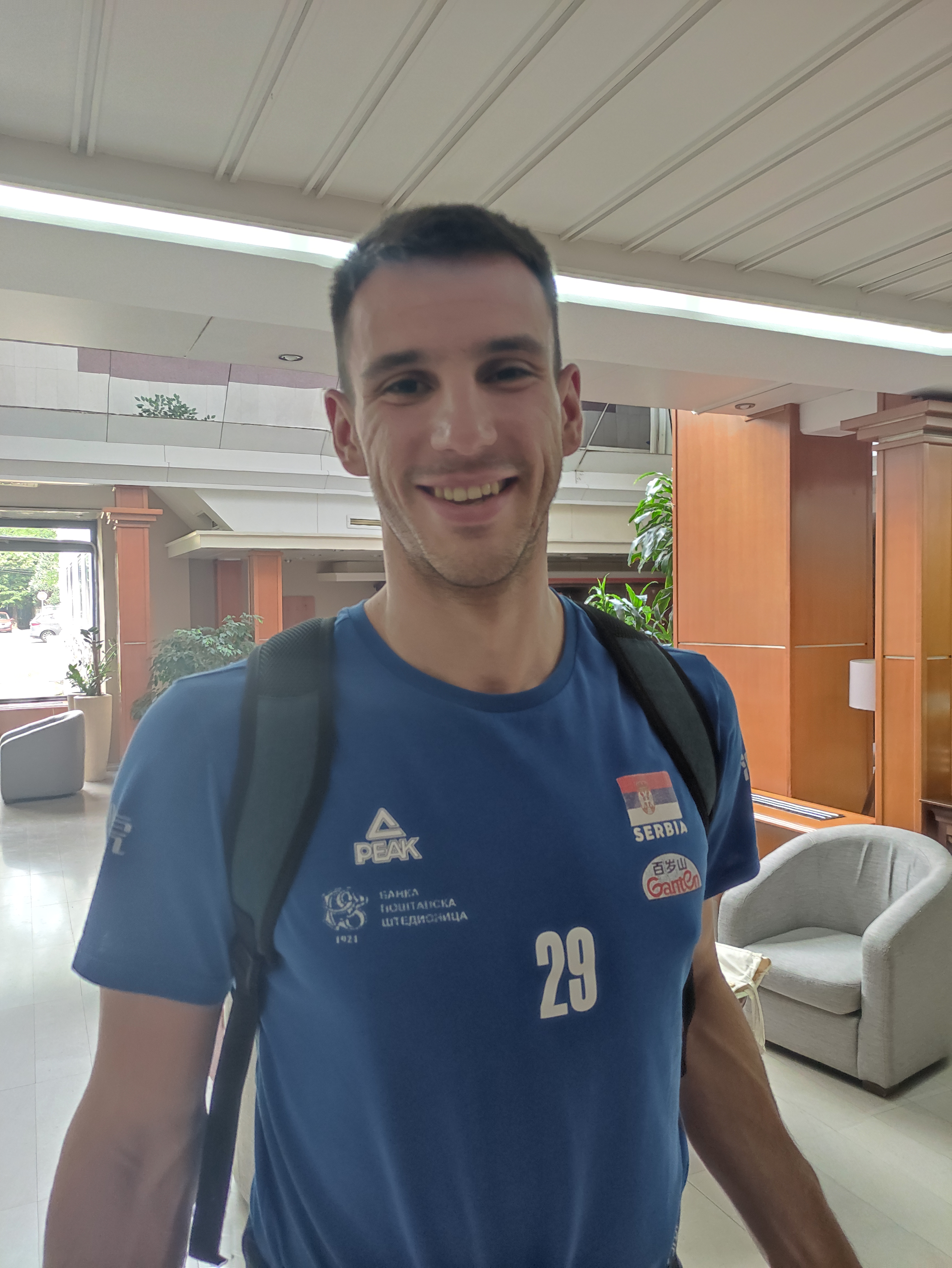

Personal information
- Born: 27 October 1997 (age 29); Vranje, Serbia, FR Yugoslavia
- Height: 2.05 m (6 ft 9 in)
- Weight: 95 kg (209 lb)
- Spike: 365 cm (144 in)
- Block: 345 cm (136 in)

Volleyball information
- Position: Middle blocker
- Current club: Itas Trentino
- Number: 29

Career
Years	Teams
2015–2017; 2017–2018; 2018–2019; 2019–2020; 2020–2022; 2022–2023; 2023–2025; 2025; 2025–2026; 2026–	Kosovska Mitrovica; Skra Bełchatów; AZS Częstochowa; Spartak Subotica; Lvi Praha; VfB Friedrichshafen; Cisterna Volley; Olympiacos Piraeus; Verona Volley; Itas Trentino

National team
Serbia
- Last updated: 9 April 2025

Aleksandar Nedeljković (Serbian Cyrillic: Александар Недељковић; born 27 October 1997) is a Serbian professional volleyball player who plays as a middle blocker for Lega Pallavolo Serie A club Itas Trentino and the Serbia national team.

== Honours ==
=== Club ===
- National championships
  - 2017–18 Polish Championship, with PGE Skra Bełchatów
  - 2021–22 Czech Championship, with Lvi Praha
  - 2022–23 German Championship, with VfB Friedrichshafen
- National cups
  - 2017–18 Polish SuperCup, with PGE Skra Bełchatów
  - 2025–26 Hellenic League Cup, with Olympiacos Piraeus
  - 2025–26 Italian Cup, with Verona Volley
