= 2015–16 Polish Men's Volleyball Cup =

2015–16 Polish Volleyball Cup
- Sport: Volleyball
- Duration: 6–7 February 2016
- TV partner: Polsat Sport

Finals
- Champions: PGE Skra Bełchatów (7th title)
- Finals MVP: Mariusz Wlazły (POL)

Seasons
- 2014–15 2016–17

The 2015–16 Polish Cup was the 59th edition of the Polish Volleyball Cup tournament.

PGE Skra Bełchatów beat ZAKSA Kędzierzyn-Koźle in the final (3–2) and won its seventh Polish Cup.

== Final four ==
- Venue: Hala Orbita, Wrocław
- All times are Central European Time (UTC+01:00).

Semifinals
14 January
ZAKSA Kędzierzyn-Koźle	3
Lotos Trefl Gdańsk	0
14 January
Asseco Resovia	1
PGE Skra Bełchatów	3

Final
15 January
ZAKSA Kędzierzyn-Koźle	2
PGE Skra Bełchatów	3

=== Semifinals ===
Date	Time		Score		Set 1	Set 2	Set 3	Set 4	Set 5	Total	Report
6 Feb	14:45	ZAKSA Kędzierzyn-Koźle	3–0	Lotos Trefl Gdańsk	25–23	25–21	25–16			75–60	Report
6 Feb	18:00	Asseco Resovia	1–3	PGE Skra Bełchatów	25–18	20–25	18–25	24–26		87–94	Report

=== Final ===
Date	Time		Score		Set 1	Set 2	Set 3	Set 4	Set 5	Total	Report
7 Feb	14:45	ZAKSA Kędzierzyn-Koźle	2–3	PGE Skra Bełchatów	25–12	23–25	25–22	26–28	17–19	116–106	Report

== Final standings ==
Rank	Team
1st place, gold medalist(s)	PGE Skra Bełchatów
2	ZAKSA Kędzierzyn-Koźle
Semifinalists	Asseco Resovia; Lotos Trefl Gdańsk

2015–16 Polish Cup winners
PGE Skra Bełchatów
7th title

== Awards ==
- Most valuable player

(Poland) Mariusz Wlazły (PGE Skra Bełchatów)

- Best server

(Poland) Łukasz Wiśniewski (ZAKSA Kędzierzyn-Koźle)

- Best receiver

(Argentina) Facundo Conte (PGE Skra Bełchatów)

- Best defender

(Poland) Paweł Zatorski (ZAKSA Kędzierzyn-Koźle)

- Best blocker

(Serbia) Srećko Lisinac (PGE Skra Bełchatów)

- Best opposite spiker

(Poland) Mariusz Wlazły (PGE Skra Bełchatów)

- Best setter

(France) Benjamin Toniutti (ZAKSA Kędzierzyn-Koźle)

== See also ==
- 2015–16 PlusLiga
