= 2017–18 PlusLiga =

- League: PlusLiga
- Sport: Volleyball
- Duration: 29 September 2017 – 5 May 2018
- Number of games: 265
- Number of teams: 16
- TV partner(s): Polsat Sport
- League champions: PGE Skra Bełchatów (9th title)

Seasons
- ← 2016–17 2018–19 →

The 2017–18 PlusLiga was the 82nd season of the Polish Volleyball Championship, the 18th season as a professional league organized by the Professional Volleyball League SA (Polish: Profesjonalna Liga Piłki Siatkowej SA) under the supervision of the Polish Volleyball Federation (Polish: Polski Związek Piłki Siatkowej).

PGE Skra Bełchatów won their 9th title of the Polish Champions.

== Regular season ==
Ranking system:

1. Points
2. Number of victories
3. Set ratio
4. Setpoint ratio
5. H2H results

Result	Winners	Losers
3–0	3 points	0 points
3–1	3 points	0 points
3–2	2 points	1 point

Pos	Team	Pld	W	L	Pts	SW	SL	SR	SPW	SPL	SPR	Qualification or relegation
1	ZAKSA Kędzierzyn-Koźle	30	25	5	75	81	31	2.613	2699	2317	1.165	Semifinals
2	PGE Skra Bełchatów	30	25	5	72	81	29	2.793	2594	2358	1.100	Semifinals
3	Trefl Gdańsk	30	24	6	65	74	35	2.114	2554	2328	1.097	Quarterfinals
4	Asseco Resovia	30	19	11	57	64	42	1.524	2456	2353	1.044	Quarterfinals
5	Indykpol AZS Olsztyn	30	19	11	57	69	49	1.408	2712	2536	1.069	Quarterfinals
6	Jastrzębski Węgiel	30	18	12	57	67	47	1.426	2591	2458	1.054	Quarterfinals
7	Onico Warsaw	30	20	10	56	70	48	1.458	2693	2579	1.044	
8	Cuprum Lubin	30	15	15	45	56	59	0.949	2555	2546	1.004	
9	Cerrad Czarni Radom	30	14	16	43	58	58	1.000	2613	2571	1.016	
10	Aluron Virtu Warta Zawiercie	30	12	18	39	54	66	0.818	2649	2720	0.974	
11	GKS Katowice	30	12	18	36	49	65	0.754	2478	2576	0.962	
12	Stocznia Szczecin	30	10	20	34	52	71	0.732	2660	2799	0.950	
13	MKS Będzin	30	10	20	29	42	71	0.592	2410	2638	0.914	
14	Łuczniczka Bydgoszcz	30	7	23	21	33	77	0.429	2338	2605	0.898	
15	BBTS Bielsko-Biała	30	6	24	19	37	80	0.463	2483	2739	0.907	Relegation
16	Dafi Społem Kielce	29	4	25	15	24	80	0.300	2151	2498	0.861	Relegation

Source: PlusLiga

=== 1st round ===
Date	Time		Score		Set 1	Set 2	Set 3	Set 4	Set 5	Total	Report
22 Nov	18:00	PGE Skra Bełchatów	3–0	Trefl Gdańsk	25–23	25–18	25–20			75–61	
1 Oct	20:00	Aluron Virtu Warta Zawiercie	1–3	ZAKSA Kędzierzyn-Koźle	23–25	25–18	24–26	15–25		87–94	
25 Oct	18:00	Jastrzębski Węgiel	3–0	BBTS Bielsko-Biała	25–16	25–21	25–18			75–55	
30 Sep	14:45	Indykpol AZS Olsztyn	3–1	Espadon Szczecin	25–22	25–18	20–25	25–20		95–85	
29 Sep	18:00	Cuprum Lubin	3–0	MKS Będzin	25–19	27–25	25–12			77–56	
30 Sep	17:00	Cerrad Czarni Radom	1–3	GKS Katowice	15–25	16–25	25–19	23–25		79–94	
30 Sep	17:00	Asseco Resovia	3–0	Dafi Społem Kielce	25–20	25–16	25–22			75–58	
1 Oct	15:00	Łuczniczka Bydgoszcz	0–3	Onico Warsaw	22–25	18–25	18–25			58–75	

=== 2nd round ===
Date	Time		Score		Set 1	Set 2	Set 3	Set 4	Set 5	Total	Report
4 Oct	18:30	Trefl Gdańsk	3–2	Onico Warsaw	25–20	17–25	25–18	23–25	15–9	105–97	
4 Oct	20:30	GKS Katowice	1–3	Łuczniczka Bydgoszcz	22–25	23–25	25–23	27–29		97–102	
4 Oct	19:00	MKS Będzin	1–3	Cerrad Czarni Radom	20–25	21–25	26–24	18–25		85–99	
4 Oct	18:00	Espadon Szczecin	2–3	Cuprum Lubin	22–25	25–17	23–25	31–29	13–15	114–111	
4 Oct	18:00	Dafi Społem Kielce	0–3	Indykpol AZS Olsztyn	10–25	19–25	18–25			47–75	
4 Oct	18:30	BBTS Bielsko-Biała	1–3	Asseco Resovia	23–25	25–16	25–27	18–25		91–93	
11 Oct	20:30	ZAKSA Kędzierzyn-Koźle	3–0	Jastrzębski Węgiel	25–17	25–18	33–31			83–66	
15 Nov	20:30	PGE Skra Bełchatów	3–0	Aluron Virtu Warta Zawiercie	25–23	29–27	25–21			79–71	

=== 3rd round ===
Date	Time		Score		Set 1	Set 2	Set 3	Set 4	Set 5	Total	Report
8 Oct	17:00	Aluron Virtu Warta Zawiercie	0–3	Trefl Gdańsk	12–25	19–25	24–26			55–76	
8 Oct	12:30	Jastrzębski Węgiel	3–1	PGE Skra Bełchatów	25–21	23–25	27–25	25–20		100–91	
7 Oct	13:00	Asseco Resovia	1–3	ZAKSA Kędzierzyn-Koźle	35–33	18–25	23–25	24–26		100–109	
7 Oct	17:00	Indykpol AZS Olsztyn	3–1	BBTS Bielsko-Biała	23–25	25–13	25–11	25–23		98–72	
7 Oct	17:00	Cuprum Lubin	3–0	Dafi Społem Kielce	25–23	25–12	25–21			75–56	
8 Oct	17:00	Cerrad Czarni Radom	1–3	Espadon Szczecin	26–28	16–25	25–21	26–28		93–102	
7 Oct	17:00	Łuczniczka Bydgoszcz	0–3	MKS Będzin	21–25	22–25	19–25			62–75	
9 Oct	18:00	Onico Warsaw	3–1	GKS Katowice	10–25	25–20	25–17	25–21		85–83	

=== 4th round ===
Date	Time		Score		Set 1	Set 2	Set 3	Set 4	Set 5	Total	Report
14 Oct	15:00	Trefl Gdańsk	0–3	GKS Katowice	20–25	23–25	22–25			65–75	
12 Oct	19:00	MKS Będzin	3–2	Onico Warsaw	21–25	29–27	23–25	25–17	15–11	113–105	
12 Oct	18:00	Espadon Szczecin	3–2	Łuczniczka Bydgoszcz	14–25	25–19	20–25	25–20	15–11	99–100	
13 Oct	18:00	Dafi Społem Kielce	3–2	Cerrad Czarni Radom	25–21	18–25	25–23	27–29	15–11	110–109	
11 Oct	18:00	BBTS Bielsko-Biała	1–3	Cuprum Lubin	17–25	22–25	25–23	20–25		84–98	
14 Nov	18:30	ZAKSA Kędzierzyn-Koźle	3–2	Indykpol AZS Olsztyn	21–25	25–19	20–25	25–17	15–9	106–95	
14 Oct	14:45	PGE Skra Bełchatów	3–0	Asseco Resovia	25–17	25–17	25–23			75–57	
15 Oct	14:45	Aluron Virtu Warta Zawiercie	0–3	Jastrzębski Węgiel	14–25	21–25	23–25			58–75	

=== 5th round ===
Date	Time		Score		Set 1	Set 2	Set 3	Set 4	Set 5	Total	Report
18 Oct	18:00	Jastrzębski Węgiel	2–3	Trefl Gdańsk	20–25	25–23	22–25	29–27	10–15	106–115	
22 Nov	20:30	Asseco Resovia	2–3	Aluron Virtu Warta Zawiercie	21–25	25–16	25–23	20–25	11–15	102–104	
18 Oct	18:00	Indykpol AZS Olsztyn	3–2	PGE Skra Bełchatów	18–25	25–21	25–23	28–30	15–12	111–111	
18 Oct	20:30	Cuprum Lubin	1–3	ZAKSA Kędzierzyn-Koźle	24–26	25–18	24–26	20–25		93–95	
18 Oct	17:00	GKS Katowice	3–0	MKS Będzin	25–21	25–23	26–24			76–68	
18 Oct	18:00	Cerrad Czarni Radom	3–0	BBTS Bielsko-Biała	25–16	25–23	25–17			75–56	
18 Oct	18:00	Łuczniczka Bydgoszcz	3–0	Dafi Społem Kielce	26–24	25–21	25–19			76–64	
17 Oct	19:00	Onico Warsaw	0–3	Espadon Szczecin	24–26	17–25	23–25			64–76	

=== 6th round ===
Date	Time		Score		Set 1	Set 2	Set 3	Set 4	Set 5	Total	Report
23 Oct	18:30	Trefl Gdańsk	3–0	MKS Będzin	25–23	25–18	25–21			75–62	
22 Oct	14:45	Espadon Szczecin	2–3	GKS Katowice	20–25	21–25	25–23	25–17	12–15	103–105	
21 Oct	17:00	Dafi Społem Kielce	0–3	Onico Warsaw	21–25	21–25	23–25			65–75	
21 Nov	18:30	BBTS Bielsko-Biała	3–0	Łuczniczka Bydgoszcz	25–18	25–21	25–15			75–54	
21 Oct	17:00	ZAKSA Kędzierzyn-Koźle	3–0	Cerrad Czarni Radom	25–17	25–20	30–28			80–65	
20 Oct	18:00	PGE Skra Bełchatów	3–0	Cuprum Lubin	25–22	25–22	26–24			76–68	
21 Oct	17:00	Aluron Virtu Warta Zawiercie	3–2	Indykpol AZS Olsztyn	21–25	23–25	25–18	26–24	16–14	111–106	
21 Oct	14:45	Jastrzębski Węgiel	2–3	Asseco Resovia	23–25	18–25	25–21	25–19	8–15	99–105	

=== 7th round ===
Date	Time		Score		Set 1	Set 2	Set 3	Set 4	Set 5	Total	Report
28 Oct	17:00	Asseco Resovia	0–3	Trefl Gdańsk	20–25	21–25	21–25			62–75	
29 Oct	14:45	Indykpol AZS Olsztyn	3–0	Jastrzębski Węgiel	25–18	25–23	31–29			81–70	
28 Oct	17:00	Cuprum Lubin	3–2	Aluron Virtu Warta Zawiercie	25–18	21–25	20–25	25–18	15–12	106–98	
27 Oct	18:00	Cerrad Czarni Radom	2–3	PGE Skra Bełchatów	25–21	25–18	20–25	21–25	12–15	103–104	
28 Oct	14:45	Łuczniczka Bydgoszcz	0–3	ZAKSA Kędzierzyn-Koźle	21–25	18–25	18–25			57–75	
28 Oct	17:00	Onico Warsaw	3–0	BBTS Bielsko-Biała	25–17	25–17	25–23			75–57	
28 Oct	17:00	GKS Katowice	3–0	Dafi Społem Kielce	25–21	25–12	25–15			75–48	
28 Oct	19:00	MKS Będzin	3–2	Espadon Szczecin	15–25	28–26	22–25	25–23	15–12	105–111	

=== 8th round ===
Date	Time		Score		Set 1	Set 2	Set 3	Set 4	Set 5	Total	Report
3 Nov	18:00	Trefl Gdańsk	1–3	Espadon Szczecin	21–25	25–22	18–25	25–27		89–99	
4 Nov	17:00	Dafi Społem Kielce	3–1	MKS Będzin	25–18	25–23	19–25	25–22		94–88	
4 Nov	17:00	BBTS Bielsko-Biała	1–3	GKS Katowice	24–26	28–30	25–22	23–25		100–103	
4 Nov	17:00	ZAKSA Kędzierzyn-Koźle	3–1	Onico Warsaw	25–17	25–22	25–27	26–24		101–90	
4 Nov	15:00	PGE Skra Bełchatów	3–0	Łuczniczka Bydgoszcz	25–22	25–16	25–22			75–60	
6 Nov	18:00	Aluron Virtu Warta Zawiercie	2–3	Cerrad Czarni Radom	21–25	21–25	25–19	25–19	14–16	106–104	
3 Nov	18:00	Jastrzębski Węgiel	3–0	Cuprum Lubin	25–17	25–17	25–18			75–52	
4 Nov	14:45	Asseco Resovia	3–0	Indykpol AZS Olsztyn	25–23	25–20	26–24			76–67	

=== 9th round ===
Date	Time		Score		Set 1	Set 2	Set 3	Set 4	Set 5	Total	Report
10 Nov	18:00	Indykpol AZS Olsztyn	2–3	Trefl Gdańsk	20–25	25–23	25–16	19–25	13–15	102–104	
10 Nov	18:00	Cuprum Lubin	2–3	Asseco Resovia	25–12	25–20	23–25	15–25	10–15	98–97	
29 Nov	18:00	Cerrad Czarni Radom	0–3	Jastrzębski Węgiel	21–25	22–25	14–25			57–75	
12 Nov	14:45	Łuczniczka Bydgoszcz	3–0	Aluron Virtu Warta Zawiercie	25–23	25–19	25–18			75–60	
9 Nov	18:00	PGE Skra Bełchatów	3–0	Onico Warsaw	26–24	25–22	28–26			79–72	
21 Nov	19:45	GKS Katowice	0–3	ZAKSA Kędzierzyn-Koźle	14–25	16–25	13–25			43–75	
11 Nov	14:45	MKS Będzin	3–1	BBTS Bielsko-Biała	37–35	25–19	21–25	25–17		108–96	
13 Nov	19:00	Espadon Szczecin	3–0	Dafi Społem Kielce	25–21	25–16	25–18			75–55	

=== 10th round ===
Date	Time		Score		Set 1	Set 2	Set 3	Set 4	Set 5	Total	Report
19 Nov	15:00	Dafi Społem Kielce	0–3	Trefl Gdańsk	23–25	33–35	11–25			67–85	
18 Nov	17:00	ZAKSA Kędzierzyn-Koźle	3–1	MKS Będzin	25–13	22–25	25–13	25–21		97–72	
17 Nov	18:00	BBTS Bielsko-Biała	3–2	Espadon Szczecin	18–25	25–20	20–25	25–21	15–12	103–103	
18 Nov	15:00	PGE Skra Bełchatów	3–0	GKS Katowice	25–22	25–22	25–22			75–66	
18 Nov	17:00	Aluron Virtu Warta Zawiercie	2–3	Onico Warsaw	25–23	18–25	23–25	25–16	12–15	103–104	
18 Nov	15:00	Jastrzębski Węgiel	3–0	Łuczniczka Bydgoszcz	25–19	25–23	25–19			75–61	
18 Nov	14:45	Asseco Resovia	3–1	Cerrad Czarni Radom	25–21	25–16	19–25	25–23		94–85	
19 Nov	14:45	Indykpol AZS Olsztyn	3–0	Cuprum Lubin	27–25	25–22	25–14			77–61	

=== 11th round ===
Date	Time		Score		Set 1	Set 2	Set 3	Set 4	Set 5	Total	Report
26 Nov	20:00	Cuprum Lubin	2–3	Trefl Gdańsk	40–38	25–19	18–25	18–25	14–16	115–123	
25 Nov	14:45	Cerrad Czarni Radom	3–0	Indykpol AZS Olsztyn	25–17	25–20	27–25			77–62	
25 Nov	17:00	Łuczniczka Bydgoszcz	1–3	Asseco Resovia	23–25	21–25	25–22	17–25		86–97	
26 Nov	14:45	Onico Warsaw	3–0	Jastrzębski Węgiel	25–16	27–25	28–26			80–67	
25 Nov	18:30	GKS Katowice	0–3	Aluron Virtu Warta Zawiercie	10–25	23–25	21–25			54–75	
25 Nov	18:00	MKS Będzin	0–3	PGE Skra Bełchatów	17–25	14–25	21–25			52–75	
24 Nov	18:00	Espadon Szczecin	2–3	ZAKSA Kędzierzyn-Koźle	21–25	27–25	25–21	14–25	9–15	96–111	
24 Nov	18:00	Dafi Społem Kielce	2–3	BBTS Bielsko-Biała	17–25	25–23	25–22	27–29	10–15	104–114	

=== 12th round ===
Date	Time		Score		Set 1	Set 2	Set 3	Set 4	Set 5	Total	Report
2 Dec	14:45	Trefl Gdańsk	3–0	BBTS Bielsko-Biała	25–16	25–17	27–25			77–58	
2 Dec	17:00	ZAKSA Kędzierzyn-Koźle	3–0	Dafi Społem Kielce	25–14	25–14	25–18			75–46	
2 Dec	15:00	PGE Skra Bełchatów	3–1	Espadon Szczecin	25–16	25–22	23–25	25–21		98–84	
2 Dec	17:00	Aluron Virtu Warta Zawiercie	3–1	MKS Będzin	22–25	25–23	25–19	25–17		97–84	
2 Dec	14:45	Jastrzębski Węgiel	3–1	GKS Katowice	19–25	25–20	25–19	25–22		94–86	
1 Dec	18:00	Asseco Resovia	0–3	Onico Warsaw	23–25	23–25	17–25			63–75	
4 Dec	18:00	Indykpol AZS Olsztyn	3–2	Łuczniczka Bydgoszcz	25–15	23–25	24–26	25–19	15–12	112–97	
3 Dec	20:00	Cuprum Lubin	2–3	Cerrad Czarni Radom	19–25	25–21	26–24	16–25	10–15	96–110	

=== 13th round ===
Date	Time		Score		Set 1	Set 2	Set 3	Set 4	Set 5	Total	Report
10 Dec	14:45	Cerrad Czarni Radom	1–3	Trefl Gdańsk	18–25	22–25	25–16	23–25		88–91	
8 Dec	18:00	Łuczniczka Bydgoszcz	0–3	Cuprum Lubin	15–25	17–25	23–25			55–75	
12 Dec	19:00	Onico Warsaw	3–1	Indykpol AZS Olsztyn	25–22	25–22	20–25	25–22		95–91	
13 Dec	18:00	GKS Katowice	0–3	Asseco Resovia	20–25	25–27	16–25			61–77	
10 Dec	20:00	MKS Będzin	3–2	Jastrzębski Węgiel	22–25	20–25	25–19	25–23	15–13	107–105	
10 Dec	17:00	Espadon Szczecin	3–2	Aluron Virtu Warta Zawiercie	21–25	25–23	23–25	25–18	15–12	109–103	
9 Dec	18:00	PGE Skra Bełchatów	3–0	Dafi Społem Kielce	25–15	27–25	25–19			77–59	
8 Nov	18:30	ZAKSA Kędzierzyn-Koźle	3–0	BBTS Bielsko-Biała	25–10	25–15	25–18			75–43	

=== 14th round ===
Date	Time		Score		Set 1	Set 2	Set 3	Set 4	Set 5	Total	Report
23 Dec	14:45	Trefl Gdańsk	0–3	ZAKSA Kędzierzyn-Koźle	20–25	20–25	23–25			63–75	
22 Dec	18:00	PGE Skra Bełchatów	3–0	BBTS Bielsko-Biała	25–20	26–24	25–21			76–65	
23 Dec	17:00	Aluron Virtu Warta Zawiercie	3–1	Dafi Społem Kielce	15–25	28–26	25–19	25–18		93–88	
23 Dec	15:00	Jastrzębski Węgiel	2–3	Espadon Szczecin	18–25	25–20	25–22	21–25	11–15	100–107	
23 Dec	17:00	Asseco Resovia	3–0	MKS Będzin	25–16	25–21	25–20			75–57	
22 Dec	18:00	Indykpol AZS Olsztyn	3–2	GKS Katowice	25–20	19–25	25–20	23–25	17–15	109–105	
20 Dec	18:00	Cuprum Lubin	0–3	Onico Warsaw	19–25	23–25	28–30			70–80	
22 Dec	18:00	Cerrad Czarni Radom	3–1	Łuczniczka Bydgoszcz	23–25	25–15	25–16	25–14		98–70	

=== 15th round ===
Date	Time		Score		Set 1	Set 2	Set 3	Set 4	Set 5	Total	Report
13 Dec	18:00	Łuczniczka Bydgoszcz	0–3	Trefl Gdańsk	11–25	20–25	19–25			50–75	
30 Dec	18:00	Onico Warsaw	3–1	Cerrad Czarni Radom	25–15	31–29	26–28	25–22		107–94	
17 Dec	15:00	GKS Katowice	1–3	Cuprum Lubin	25–18	17–25	21–25	21–25		84–93	
30 Dec	18:00	MKS Będzin	3–1	Indykpol AZS Olsztyn	25–20	21–25	25–22	26–24		97–91	
29 Dec	18:00	Espadon Szczecin	0–3	Asseco Resovia	28–30	20–25	20–25			68–80	
30 Dec	17:00	Dafi Społem Kielce	0–3	Jastrzębski Węgiel	17–25	22–25	19–25			58–75	
18 Dec	18:00	BBTS Bielsko-Biała	2–3	Aluron Virtu Warta Zawiercie	26–24	27–29	22–25	25–21	12–15	112–114	
30 Dec	14:45	ZAKSA Kędzierzyn-Koźle	3–1	PGE Skra Bełchatów	25–20	25–21	20–25	25–20		95–86	

=== 16th round ===
Date	Time		Score		Set 1	Set 2	Set 3	Set 4	Set 5	Total	Report
5 Jan	18:00	Trefl Gdańsk	1–3	PGE Skra Bełchatów	28–26	25–27	21–25	24–26		98–104	
6 Jan	17:00	ZAKSA Kędzierzyn-Koźle	3–1	Aluron Virtu Warta Zawiercie	22–25	25–17	25–23	26–24		98–89	
6 Jan	17:00	BBTS Bielsko-Biała	2–3	Jastrzębski Węgiel	25–19	19–25	25–21	23–25	8–15	100–105	
6 Jan	14:45	Dafi Społem Kielce	3–1	Asseco Resovia	30–28	29–27	20–25	25–21		104–101	
7 Jan	20:00	Espadon Szczecin	0–3	Indykpol AZS Olsztyn	14–25	23–25	18–25			55–75	
6 Jan	18:00	MKS Będzin	1–3	Cuprum Lubin	25–20	23–25	11–25	19–25		78–95	
6 Jan	17:00	GKS Katowice	3–1	Cerrad Czarni Radom	25–21	25–21	21–25	25–19		96–86	
6 Jan	14:45	Onico Warsaw	3–2	Łuczniczka Bydgoszcz	25–17	23–25	25–14	21–25	15–12	109–93	

=== 17th round ===
Date	Time		Score		Set 1	Set 2	Set 3	Set 4	Set 5	Total	Report
13 Jan	20:00	Onico Warsaw	3–0	Trefl Gdańsk	25–16	25–18	25–18			75–52	
13 Jan	16:00	Łuczniczka Bydgoszcz	3–1	GKS Katowice	25–23	20–25	25–13	25–22		95–83	
12 Jan	18:00	Cerrad Czarni Radom	3–0	MKS Będzin	25–20	25–22	25–21			75–63	
12 Jan	18:00	Cuprum Lubin	3–1	Espadon Szczecin	25–23	25–18	27–29	25–17		102–87	
14 Jan	15:00	Indykpol AZS Olsztyn	3–0	Dafi Społem Kielce	25–22	25–20	25–23			75–65	
13 Jan	17:00	Asseco Resovia	3–0	BBTS Bielsko-Biała	25–22	25–18	25–21			75–61	
13 Jan	14:45	Jastrzębski Węgiel	1–3	ZAKSA Kędzierzyn-Koźle	27–25	17–25	20–25	21–25		85–100	
14 Jan	14:45	Aluron Virtu Warta Zawiercie	3–0	PGE Skra Bełchatów	26–24	25–21	25–19			76–64	

=== 18th round ===
Date	Time		Score		Set 1	Set 2	Set 3	Set 4	Set 5	Total	Report
22 Jan	18:00	Trefl Gdańsk	3–1	Aluron Virtu Warta Zawiercie	20–25	25–20	25–22	25–15		95–82	
21 Jan	14:45	PGE Skra Bełchatów	2–3	Jastrzębski Węgiel	25–22	16–25	25–18	21–25	10–15	97–105	
21 Jan	20:00	ZAKSA Kędzierzyn-Koźle	1–3	Asseco Resovia	25–21	22–25	25–27	22–25		94–98	
20 Jan	17:00	BBTS Bielsko-Biała	1–3	Indykpol AZS Olsztyn	15–25	22–25	25–17	15–25		77–92	
18 Jan	18:00	Dafi Społem Kielce	2–3	Cuprum Lubin	25–23	20–25	22–25	25–19	14–16	106–108	
19 Jan	18:00	Espadon Szczecin	2–3	Cerrad Czarni Radom	17–25	15–25	25–20	27–25	13–15	97–110	
20 Jan	18:00	MKS Będzin	3–1	Łuczniczka Bydgoszcz	25–23	16–25	25–19	25–23		91–90	
19 Jan	18:00	GKS Katowice	1–3	Onico Warsaw	25–17	21–25	21–25	23–25		90–92	

=== 19th round ===
Date	Time		Score		Set 1	Set 2	Set 3	Set 4	Set 5	Total	Report
2 Feb	18:00	GKS Katowice	0–3	Trefl Gdańsk	29–31	19–25	21–25			69–81	
3 Feb	20:00	Onico Warsaw	3–1	MKS Będzin	20–25	25–17	25–12	25–22		95–76	
2 Feb	18:00	Łuczniczka Bydgoszcz	3–2	Espadon Szczecin	25–20	25–21	18–25	40–42	20–18	128–126	
4 Feb	17:00	Cerrad Czarni Radom	3–0	Dafi Społem Kielce	25–18	25–20	28–26			78–64	
3 Feb	17:00	Cuprum Lubin	3–0	BBTS Bielsko-Biała	25–22	25–15	25–18			75–55	
3 Feb	14:45	Indykpol AZS Olsztyn	0–3	ZAKSA Kędzierzyn-Koźle	17–25	22–25	15–25			54–75	
4 Feb	14:45	Asseco Resovia	2–3	PGE Skra Bełchatów	23–25	25–15	26–24	24–26	10–15	108–105	
3 Feb	15:00	Jastrzębski Węgiel	3–0	Aluron Virtu Warta Zawiercie	25–15	30–28	25–22			80–65	

=== 20th round ===
Date	Time		Score		Set 1	Set 2	Set 3	Set 4	Set 5	Total	Report
7 Feb	20:30	Trefl Gdańsk	3–2	Jastrzębski Węgiel	20–25	18–25	28–26	25–19	15–13	106–108	
10 Feb	14:45	Aluron Virtu Warta Zawiercie	0–3	Asseco Resovia	21–25	19–25	23–25			63–75	
9 Feb	18:00	PGE Skra Bełchatów	3–2	Indykpol AZS Olsztyn	18–25	23–25	25–22	25–14	18–16	109–102	
10 Feb	18:00	ZAKSA Kędzierzyn-Koźle	3–0	Cuprum Lubin	25–22	25–23	25–23			75–68	
10 Feb	17:00	BBTS Bielsko-Biała	1–3	Cerrad Czarni Radom	22–25	22–25	26–24	26–28		96–102	
10 Feb	17:00	Dafi Społem Kielce	3–1	Łuczniczka Bydgoszcz	22–25	25–23	25–20	25–22		97–90	
7 Feb	19:00	Espadon Szczecin	1–3	Onico Warsaw	27–25	22–25	16–25	23–25		88–100	
11 Feb	14:45	MKS Będzin	2–3	GKS Katowice	23–25	25–14	21–25	25–21	12–15	106–100	

=== 21st round ===
Date	Time		Score		Set 1	Set 2	Set 3	Set 4	Set 5	Total	Report
17 Feb	18:00	MKS Będzin	0–3	Trefl Gdańsk	19–25	20–25	23–25			62–75	
17 Feb	17:00	GKS Katowice	3–1	Espadon Szczecin	22–25	25–14	25–23	25–18		97–80	
16 Feb	18:00	Onico Warsaw	3–2	Dafi Społem Kielce	25–15	23–25	25–21	15–25	15–10	103–96	
16 Feb	18:00	Łuczniczka Bydgoszcz	3–2	BBTS Bielsko-Biała	22–25	23–25	25–19	25–14	15–9	110–92	
17 Feb	17:00	Cerrad Czarni Radom	1–3	ZAKSA Kędzierzyn-Koźle	25–20	21–25	16–25	18–25		80–95	
17 Feb	14:45	Cuprum Lubin	0–3	PGE Skra Bełchatów	20–25	15–25	23–25			58–75	
17 Feb	17:00	Indykpol AZS Olsztyn	3–2	Aluron Virtu Warta Zawiercie	29–27	25–16	19–25	24–26	29–27	126–121	
18 Feb	14:45	Asseco Resovia	3–0	Jastrzębski Węgiel	25–21	25–20	25–21			75–62	

=== 22nd round ===
Date	Time		Score		Set 1	Set 2	Set 3	Set 4	Set 5	Total	Report
23 Feb	18:00	Trefl Gdańsk	3–0	Asseco Resovia	25–20	25–21	25–20			75–61	
24 Feb	14:45	Jastrzębski Węgiel	3–0	Indykpol AZS Olsztyn	36–34	25–20	26–24			87–78	
24 Feb	17:00	Aluron Virtu Warta Zawiercie	2–3	Cuprum Lubin	25–14	20–25	17–25	25–23	10–15	97–102	
25 Feb	18:00	PGE Skra Bełchatów	3–2	Cerrad Czarni Radom	25–23	18–25	18–25	25–22	15–12	101–107	
24 Feb	17:00	ZAKSA Kędzierzyn-Koźle	3–1	Łuczniczka Bydgoszcz	22–25	25–17	25–17	25–15		97–74	
24 Feb	17:00	BBTS Bielsko-Biała	3–1	Onico Warsaw	25–23	25–20	22–25	25–22		97–90	
25 Feb	14:45	Dafi Społem Kielce	0–3	GKS Katowice	18–25	23–25	23–25			64–75	
24 Feb	17:00	Espadon Szczecin	1–3	MKS Będzin	25–22	22–25	17–25	19–25		83–97	

=== 23rd round ===
Date	Time		Score		Set 1	Set 2	Set 3	Set 4	Set 5	Total	Report
1 Mar	19:00	Espadon Szczecin	0–3	Trefl Gdańsk	20–25	14–25	21–25			55–75	
4 Mar	20:00	MKS Będzin	3–0	Dafi Społem Kielce	25–22	25–19	28–26			78–67	
3 Mar	17:00	GKS Katowice	3–2	BBTS Bielsko-Biała	19–25	22–25	25–22	25–23	15–12	106–107	
20 Feb	19:00	Onico Warsaw	3–2	ZAKSA Kędzierzyn-Koźle	25–21	27–25	20–25	21–25	15–11	108–107	
3 Mar	15:00	Łuczniczka Bydgoszcz	0–3	PGE Skra Bełchatów	20–25	21–25	17–25			58–75	
2 Mar	18:00	Cerrad Czarni Radom	3–0	Aluron Virtu Warta Zawiercie	25–19	25–21	25–22			75–62	
4 Mar	14:45	Cuprum Lubin	3–0	Jastrzębski Węgiel	25–23	25–23	25–16			75–62	
3 Mar	14:45	Indykpol AZS Olsztyn	3–1	Asseco Resovia	23–25	25–23	25–19	25–13		98–80	

=== 24th round ===
Date	Time		Score		Set 1	Set 2	Set 3	Set 4	Set 5	Total	Report
7 Mar	20:30	Trefl Gdańsk	3–2	Indykpol AZS Olsztyn	17–25	21–25	25–22	25–17	16–14	104–103	
7 Mar	18:00	Asseco Resovia	3–0	Cuprum Lubin	25–22	25–20	25–19			75–61	
7 Mar	18:00	Jastrzębski Węgiel	3–1	Cerrad Czarni Radom	25–20	18–25	25–16	25–22		93–83	
7 Mar	18:00	Aluron Virtu Warta Zawiercie	3–0	Łuczniczka Bydgoszcz	25–22	25–20	25–23			75–65	
28 Mar	20:30	Onico Warsaw	1–3	PGE Skra Bełchatów	19–25	21–25	25–21	16–25		81–96	
7 Mar	18:30	ZAKSA Kędzierzyn-Koźle	1–3	GKS Katowice	20–25	19–25	26–24	23–25		88–99	
7 Mar	18:00	BBTS Bielsko-Biała	1–3	MKS Będzin	18–25	20–25	25–20	21–25		84–95	
7 Mar	18:00	Dafi Społem Kielce	0–3	Espadon Szczecin	20–25	27–29	22–25			69–79	

=== 25th round ===
Date	Time		Score		Set 1	Set 2	Set 3	Set 4	Set 5	Total	Report
11 Mar	15:00	Trefl Gdańsk	3–0	Dafi Społem Kielce	25–18	25–19	25–21			75–58	
10 Mar	18:00	MKS Będzin	1–3	ZAKSA Kędzierzyn-Koźle	23–25	26–24	17–25	24–26		90–100	
11 Mar	17:00	Espadon Szczecin	2–3	BBTS Bielsko-Biała	22–25	25–20	19–25	25–20	13–15	104–105	
9 Mar	18:00	GKS Katowice	0–3	PGE Skra Bełchatów	20–25	23–25	18–25			61–75	
12 Mar	18:00	Onico Warsaw	3–2	Aluron Virtu Warta Zawiercie	25–14	23–25	28–30	25–23	15–8	116–100	
10 Mar	15:00	Łuczniczka Bydgoszcz	1–3	Jastrzębski Węgiel	13–25	22–25	25–20	21–25		81–95	
10 Mar	17:00	Cerrad Czarni Radom	3–0	Asseco Resovia	25–18	25–22	25–20			75–60	
11 Mar	20:00	Cuprum Lubin	1–3	Indykpol AZS Olsztyn	25–23	21–25	20–25	18–25		84–98	

=== 26th round ===
Date	Time		Score		Set 1	Set 2	Set 3	Set 4	Set 5	Total	Report
16 Mar	18:00	Trefl Gdańsk	3–0	Cuprum Lubin	25–18	27–25	25–18			77–61	
18 Mar	14:45	Indykpol AZS Olsztyn	3–0	Cerrad Czarni Radom	27–25	25–22	25–20			77–67	
17 Mar	14:45	Asseco Resovia	3–0	Łuczniczka Bydgoszcz	25–22	25–20	26–24			76–66	
17 Mar	14:45	Jastrzębski Węgiel	3–1	Onico Warsaw	25–18	25–21	19–25	25–23		94–87	
19 Mar	18:00	Aluron Virtu Warta Zawiercie	3–0	GKS Katowice	25–15	25–21	25–21			75–57	
17 Mar	15:00	PGE Skra Bełchatów	3–0	MKS Będzin	25–20	25–12	25–20			75–52	
17 Mar	17:00	ZAKSA Kędzierzyn-Koźle	3–0	Espadon Szczecin	25–15	25–10	25–18			75–43	
17 Mar	17:00	BBTS Bielsko-Biała	3–1	Dafi Społem Kielce	25–21	25–20	19–25	25–19		94–85	

=== 27th round ===
Date	Time		Score		Set 1	Set 2	Set 3	Set 4	Set 5	Total	Report
4 Apr	18:00	BBTS Bielsko-Biała	1–3	Trefl Gdańsk	16–25	22–25	26–24	18–25		82–99	
25 Mar	17:00	Dafi Społem Kielce	1–3	ZAKSA Kędzierzyn-Koźle	15–25	25–23	15–25	13–25		68–98	
26 Mar	18:00	Espadon Szczecin	0–3	PGE Skra Bełchatów	21–25	19–25	25–27			65–77	
25 Mar	18:00	MKS Będzin	2–3	Aluron Virtu Warta Zawiercie	20–25	23–25	25–23	25–23	15–17	108–113	
25 Mar	14:45	GKS Katowice	2–3	Jastrzębski Węgiel	20–25	19–25	25–22	25–20	7–15	96–107	
25 Mar	20:00	Onico Warsaw	3–0	Asseco Resovia	25–20	27–25	25–23			77–68	
24 Mar	14:45	Łuczniczka Bydgoszcz	0–3	Indykpol AZS Olsztyn	19–25	32–34	17–25			68–84	
23 Mar	18:00	Cerrad Czarni Radom	3–1	Cuprum Lubin	25–20	25–20	18–25	25–19		93–84	

=== 28th round ===
Date	Time		Score		Set 1	Set 2	Set 3	Set 4	Set 5	Total	Report
29 Mar	18:00	Trefl Gdańsk	3–0	Cerrad Czarni Radom	25–21	25–16	25–16			75–53	
29 Mar	17:00	Cuprum Lubin	2–3	Łuczniczka Bydgoszcz	23–25	31–33	25–23	25–23	11–15	115–119	
30 Mar	18:00	Indykpol AZS Olsztyn	3–1	Onico Warsaw	25–21	21–25	28–18	25–21		99–85	
30 Mar	18:00	Asseco Resovia	3–0	GKS Katowice	25–23	25–15	25–22			75–60	
30 Mar	17:00	Jastrzębski Węgiel	3–0	MKS Będzin	25–16	25–21	25–20			75–57	
30 Mar	18:00	Aluron Virtu Warta Zawiercie	1–3	Espadon Szczecin	31–33	26–24	21–25	23–25		101–107	
30 Mar	18:00	Dafi Społem Kielce	2–3	PGE Skra Bełchatów	20–25	25–23	19–25	25–18	13–15	102–106	
31 Mar	14:45	BBTS Bielsko-Biała	0–3	ZAKSA Kędzierzyn-Koźle	24–26	20–25	24–26			68–77	

=== 29th round ===
Date	Time		Score		Set 1	Set 2	Set 3	Set 4	Set 5	Total	Report
7 Apr	14:45	ZAKSA Kędzierzyn-Koźle	2–3	Trefl Gdańsk	25–18	25–23	19–25	21–25	11–15	101–106	
7 Apr	17:00	BBTS Bielsko-Biała	1–3	PGE Skra Bełchatów	25–23	22–25	23–25	18–25		88–98	
9 Apr	18:00	Dafi Społem Kielce	1–3	Aluron Virtu Warta Zawiercie	23–25	19–25	25–22	20–25		87–97	
6 Apr	19:00	Stocznia Szczecin	3–2	Jastrzębski Węgiel	18–25	25–23	25–17	19–25	15–11	102–101	
8 Apr	17:30	MKS Będzin	1–3	Asseco Resovia	28–26	23–25	19–25	16–25		86–101	
7 Apr	17:30	GKS Katowice	2–3	Indykpol AZS Olsztyn	25–20	25–22	21–25	20–25	11–15	102–107	
8 Apr	20:00	Onico Warsaw	1–3	Cuprum Lubin	21–25	23–25	25–13	20–25		89–88	
4 Apr	18:00	Łuczniczka Bydgoszcz	0–3	Cerrad Czarni Radom	20–25	29–31	20–25			69–81	

=== 30th round ===
Date	Time		Score		Set 1	Set 2	Set 3	Set 4	Set 5	Total	Report
15 Apr	14:45	Trefl Gdańsk	3–0	Łuczniczka Bydgoszcz	30–28	25–15	27–25			82–68	
13 Apr	18:00	Cerrad Czarni Radom	2–3	Onico Warsaw	25–22	25–16	26–28	22–25	14–16	112–107	
15 Apr	14:45	Cuprum Lubin	3–1	GKS Katowice	28–18	25–17	15–25	25–20		93–80	
15 Apr	14:45	Indykpol AZS Olsztyn	3–0	MKS Będzin	25–14	25–17	25–11			75–42	
15 Apr	14:45	Asseco Resovia	3–0	Stocznia Szczecin	25–18	25–21	25–19			75–58	
15 Apr	14:45	Jastrzębski Węgiel	3–0	Dafi Społem Kielce	25–23	25–16	25–21			75–60	
15 Apr	14:45	Aluron Virtu Warta Zawiercie	3–1	BBTS Bielsko-Biała	32–30	16–25	25–21	25–21		98–97	
14 Apr	14:45	PGE Skra Bełchatów	3–0	ZAKSA Kędzierzyn-Koźle	26–24	25–17	34–32			85–73	

== Playoffs ==
=== Quarterfinals ===
- (to 2 victories)

==== Quarterfinal A ====
Date	Time		Score		Set 1	Set 2	Set 3	Set 4	Set 5	Total	Report
18 Apr	17:00	Indykpol AZS Olsztyn	2–3	Asseco Resovia	25–22	27–25	23–25	19–25	6–15	100–112	
21 Apr	14:45	Asseco Resovia	1–3	Indykpol AZS Olsztyn	28–30	25–21	15–25	23–25		91–101	
22 Apr	14:45	Asseco Resovia	1–3	Indykpol AZS Olsztyn	22–25	25–18	26–28	26–28		99–99	

==== Quarterfinal B ====
Date	Time		Score		Set 1	Set 2	Set 3	Set 4	Set 5	Total	Report
18 Apr	20:30	Jastrzębski Węgiel	1–3	Trefl Gdańsk	25–14	21–25	23–25	14–25		83–89	
21 Apr	20:00	Trefl Gdańsk	1–3	Jastrzębski Węgiel	25–23	27–29	17–25	21–25		90–102	
22 Apr	20:00	Trefl Gdańsk	3–2	Jastrzębski Węgiel	25–17	21–25	18–25	26–24	16–14	106–105	

=== Semifinals ===
- (to 2 victories)

==== Semifinal A ====
Date	Time		Score		Set 1	Set 2	Set 3	Set 4	Set 5	Total	Report
25 Apr	20:30	Indykpol AZS Olsztyn	2–3	ZAKSA Kędzierzyn-Koźle	25–27	25–20	23–25	27–25	17–19	117–116	
28 Apr	20:30	ZAKSA Kędzierzyn-Koźle	3–2	Indykpol AZS Olsztyn	19–25	22–25	25–17	25–20	15–11	106–98	

==== Semifinal B ====
Date	Time		Score		Set 1	Set 2	Set 3	Set 4	Set 5	Total	Report
25 Apr	17:30	Trefl Gdańsk	2–3	PGE Skra Bełchatów	25–22	20–25	28–26	16–25	12–15	101–113	
28 Apr	17:30	PGE Skra Bełchatów	3–2	Trefl Gdańsk	25–19	31–33	25–17	24–26	15–13	120–108	

=== Finals ===
- (to 2 victories)

Date	Time		Score		Set 1	Set 2	Set 3	Set 4	Set 5	Total	Report
2 May	20:30	PGE Skra Bełchatów	3–0	ZAKSA Kędzierzyn-Koźle	25–23	25–23	26–24			76–70	
5 May	20:30	ZAKSA Kędzierzyn-Koźle	1–3	PGE Skra Bełchatów	25–15	20–25	21–25	23–25		89–90	

== Placement matches ==
- (to 2 victories)

=== 13th place ===
Date	Time		Score		Set 1	Set 2	Set 3	Set 4	Set 5	Total	Report
19 Apr	18:00	Łuczniczka Bydgoszcz	2–3	MKS Będzin	23–25	25–21	25–19	14–25	16–18	103–108	
22 Apr	17:00	MKS Będzin	3–0	Łuczniczka Bydgoszcz	25–19	25–19	25–20			75–58	

=== 11th place ===
Date	Time		Score		Set 1	Set 2	Set 3	Set 4	Set 5	Total	Report
18 Apr	18:00	Stocznia Szczecin	2–3	GKS Katowice	22–25	20–25	25–20	25–21	13–15	105–106	
21 Apr	17:00	GKS Katowice	3–0	Stocznia Szczecin	25–20	25–18	25–18			75–56	

=== 9th place ===
Date	Time		Score		Set 1	Set 2	Set 3	Set 4	Set 5	Total	Report
18 Apr	18:00	Aluron Virtu Warta Zawiercie	3–1	Cerrad Czarni Radom	23–25	25–20	25–21	25–21		98–87	
20 Apr	18:30	Cerrad Czarni Radom	3–0	Aluron Virtu Warta Zawiercie	25–18	25–19	25–18			75–55	
Golden set		Cerrad Czarni Radom	12–15	Aluron Virtu Warta Zawiercie							

=== 7th place ===
Date	Time		Score		Set 1	Set 2	Set 3	Set 4	Set 5	Total	Report
18 Apr	18:00	Cuprum Lubin	1–3	Onico Warsaw	18–25	25–22	17–25	23–25		83–97	
23 Apr	20:00	Onico Warsaw	1–3	Cuprum Lubin	16–25	18–25	25–18	21–25		80–93	
Golden set		Onico Warsaw	16–18	Cuprum Lubin							

=== 5th place ===
Date	Time		Score		Set 1	Set 2	Set 3	Set 4	Set 5	Total	Report
25 Apr	18:00	Jastrzębski Węgiel	3–2	Asseco Resovia	16–25	21–25	25–16	25–18	15–10	102–94	
28 Apr	17:00	Asseco Resovia	3–1	Jastrzębski Węgiel	19–25	31–29	28–26	26–24		104–104	
29 Apr	14:45	Asseco Resovia	1–3	Jastrzębski Węgiel	23–25	27–25	27–29	20–25		97–104	

=== 3rd place ===
Date	Time		Score		Set 1	Set 2	Set 3	Set 4	Set 5	Total	Report
2 May	17:30	Indykpol AZS Olsztyn	2–3	Trefl Gdańsk	25–16	26–24	26–28	23–25	12–15	112–108	
5 May	17:30	Trefl Gdańsk	3–1	Indykpol AZS Olsztyn	25–16	20–25	25–19	25–18		95–78	

== Final standings ==
Qualified for the 2018–19 CEV Champions League
Qualified for the 2018–19 CEV Cup
Playoffs with the top team from the 1st league
Relegation to the 1st league

Rank	Team
1st place, gold medalist(s)	PGE Skra Bełchatów
2nd place, silver medalist(s)	ZAKSA Kędzierzyn-Koźle
3rd place, bronze medalist(s)	Trefl Gdańsk
4	Indykpol AZS Olsztyn
5	Jastrzębski Węgiel
6	Asseco Resovia
7	Cuprum Lubin
8	Onico Warsaw
9	Aluron Virtu Warta Zawiercie
10	Cerrad Czarni Radom
11	GKS Katowice
12	Stocznia Szczecin
13	MKS Będzin
14	Łuczniczka Bydgoszcz
15	BBTS Bielsko-Biała
16	Dafi Społem Kielce

2018 Polish champions
PGE Skra Bełchatów
9th title

== Squads ==
Aluron Virtu Warta Zawiercie
No.	Name	Date of birth	Height	Position
2	(Poland) Mariusz Marcyniak	5 March 1992	2.06 m (6 ft 9 in)	middle blocker
3	(Poland) Łukasz Swodczyk	1 June 1990	1.96 m (6 ft 5 in)	middle blocker
4	(Poland) Kamil Długosz	20 March 1992	0 m (0 in)	outside hitter
5	(Poland) Michał Żuk	4 July 1985	1.96 m (6 ft 5 in)	outside hitter
7	(Poland) Maciej Zajder	31 January 1988	0 m (0 in)	middle blocker
8	(Poland) Łukasz Kaczorowski	12 May 1988	0 m (0 in)	opposite
9	(Poland) Krzysztof Andrzejewski	26 January 1983	1.80 m (5 ft 11 in)	libero
10	(Brazil) Hugo de Leon Guimarães	4 July 1990	1.98 m (6 ft 6 in)	outside hitter
12	(Poland) Grzegorz Bociek	6 June 1991	2.07 m (6 ft 9 in)	opposite
13	(Poland) Kacper Popik	19 October 1992	1.91 m (6 ft 3 in)	setter
14	(Poland) Grzegorz Pająk	1 January 1987	1.96 m (6 ft 5 in)	setter
15	(United States) David Smith	15 May 1985	2.01 m (6 ft 7 in)	middle blocker
17	(Slovakia) Matej Pátak	8 June 1990	1.97 m (6 ft 6 in)	outside hitter
19	(Japan) Taichirō Koga	4 October 1989	1.70 m (5 ft 7 in)	libero
Head coach:		(Italy) Emanuele Zanini		

Asseco Resovia
No.	Name	Date of birth	Height	Position
1	(Poland) Michał Kędzierski	9 August 1994	1.94 m (6 ft 4 in)	setter
2	(Poland) Paweł Rusek	21 January 1983	1.83 m (6 ft 0 in)	libero
3	(Poland) Bartłomiej Lemański	19 March 1996	2.16 m (7 ft 1 in)	middle blocker
5	(Czech Republic) Lukáš Ticháček	12 January 1982	1.93 m (6 ft 4 in)	setter
6	(Poland) Dominik Depowski	27 October 1995	2.00 m (6 ft 7 in)	outside hitter
7	(Poland) Jakub Jarosz	10 February 1987	1.97 m (6 ft 6 in)	opposite
8	(Finland) Elviss Krastiņš	15 September 1994	1.92 m (6 ft 4 in)	outside hitter
9	(France) Thibault Rossard	28 August 1993	1.93 m (6 ft 4 in)	outside hitter
10	(Germany) Jochen Schöps	8 October 1983	2.00 m (6 ft 7 in)	opposite
11	(Poland) Aleksander Śliwka	24 May 1995	1.98 m (6 ft 6 in)	outside hitter
12	(Poland) Łukasz Perłowski	3 April 1984	2.04 m (6 ft 8 in)	middle blocker
13	(Poland) Mateusz Masłowski	13 June 1997	1.85 m (6 ft 1 in)	libero
15	(France) Barthélémy Chinenyeze	28 February 1998	2.04 m (6 ft 8 in)	middle blocker
17	(Poland) Marcin Możdżonek	9 February 1985	2.11 m (6 ft 11 in)	middle blocker
18	(Poland) Dawid Dryja	21 July 1992	2.01 m (6 ft 7 in)	middle blocker
Head coach:		(Italy) Roberto Serniotti → (Poland) Andrzej Kowal		

BBTS Bielsko-Biała
No.	Name	Date of birth	Height	Position
1	(Poland) Jarosław Macionczyk	22 January 1979	1.90 m (6 ft 3 in)	setter
3	(Russia) Vyacheslav Tarasov	2 February 1988	2.00 m (6 ft 7 in)	outside hitter
4	(Poland) Wojciech Siek	10 May 1994	2.05 m (6 ft 9 in)	middle blocker
5	(Poland) Jakub Bucki	13 August 1988	1.97 m (6 ft 6 in)	opposite
6	(Poland) Piotr Łukasik	11 July 1994	2.08 m (6 ft 10 in)	outside hitter
7	(Poland) Przemysław Czauderna	21 May 1992	1.83 m (6 ft 0 in)	libero
8	(Poland) Bartosz Janeczek	12 July 1987	1.98 m (6 ft 6 in)	outside hitter
9	(Poland) Maciej Skowroński	8 April 1995	2.02 m (6 ft 8 in)	middle blocker
10	(Poland) Mariusz Gaca	20 January 1984	2.00 m (6 ft 7 in)	middle blocker
11	(Poland) Kajetan Marek	6 January 1994	1.86 m (6 ft 1 in)	libero
13	(Poland) Tomasz Piotrowski	2 September 1997	1.98 m (6 ft 6 in)	outside hitter
16	(Poland) Bartosz Cedzyński	20 December 1990	2.11 m (6 ft 11 in)	middle blocker
17	(Australia) Harrison Peacock	31 January 1991	1.95 m (6 ft 5 in)	setter
19	(Poland) Dominik Jaglarski	20 June 1997	1.87 m (6 ft 2 in)	libero
20	(Russia) Oleg Krikun	20 April 1991	2.02 m (6 ft 8 in)	opposite
Head coach:		(Slovakia) Rastislav Chudík → (Poland) Paweł Gradowski		

Cerrad Czarni Radom
No.	Name	Date of birth	Height	Position
1	(Ukraine) Dmytro Teryomenko	1 February 1987	2.00 m (6 ft 7 in)	middle blocker
2	(Poland) Michał Ostrowski	29 March 1990	2.03 m (6 ft 8 in)	middle blocker
5	(Slovenia) Dejan Vinčić	15 September 1986	2.02 m (6 ft 8 in)	setter
6	(Poland) Wojciech Żaliński	8 January 1988	1.96 m (6 ft 5 in)	outside hitter
7	(United States) Dustin Watten	27 October 1986	1.83 m (6 ft 0 in)	libero
8	(Poland) Kacper Wasilewski	4 January 1998	1.91 m (6 ft 3 in)	libero
9	(Poland) Jakub Ziobrowski	23 January 1997	2.02 m (6 ft 8 in)	opposite
10	(Poland) Michał Filip	31 August 1994	1.97 m (6 ft 6 in)	opposite
11	(Poland) Kamil Droszyński	28 January 1997	1.90 m (6 ft 3 in)	setter
13	(Poland) Łukasz Zugaj	27 January 1993	1.92 m (6 ft 4 in)	opposite
14	(Poland) Jakub Rybicki	1 November 1998	1.96 m (6 ft 5 in)	outside hitter
15	(Poland) Norbert Huber	14 August 1998	2.07 m (6 ft 9 in)	middle blocker
19	(Poland) Tomasz Fornal	31 August 1997	2.00 m (6 ft 7 in)	outside hitter
20	(Poland) Kamil Kwasowski	13 September 1990	1.97 m (6 ft 6 in)	outside hitter
Head coach:		(Poland) Robert Prygiel		

Cuprum Lubin
No.	Name	Date of birth	Height	Position
2	(Poland) Łukasz Kaczmarek	29 June 1994	2.04 m (6 ft 8 in)	opposite
3	(Estonia) Keith Pupart	19 March 1985	1.95 m (6 ft 5 in)	outside hitter
5	(Poland) Adam Michalski	24 December 1988	2.01 m (6 ft 7 in)	middle blocker
6	(Serbia) Miloš Terzić	13 June 1987	2.01 m (6 ft 7 in)	outside hitter
7	(Poland) Maciej Gorzkiewicz	16 February 1984	1.92 m (6 ft 4 in)	setter
8	(Poland) Adrian Patucha	25 June 1983	1.96 m (6 ft 5 in)	opposite
9	(Estonia) Robert Täht	15 August 1993	1.92 m (6 ft 4 in)	outside hitter
10	(Poland) Dawid Gunia	1 January 1987	2.03 m (6 ft 8 in)	middle blocker
11	(Poland) Filip Biegun	21 May 1996	2.00 m (6 ft 7 in)	outside hitter
12	(Poland) Przemysław Smoliński	27 November 1992	2.01 m (6 ft 7 in)	middle blocker
13	(Slovakia) Michal Masný	14 August 1979	1.82 m (6 ft 0 in)	setter
16	(Poland) Piotr Hain	26 February 1991	2.07 m (6 ft 9 in)	middle blocker
17	(Poland) Marcin Kryś	15 January 1983	1.92 m (6 ft 4 in)	libero
18	(Poland) Bartosz Makoś	1 August 1998	1.76 m (5 ft 9 in)	libero
Head coach:		(France) Patrick Duflos		

Dafi Społem Kielce
No.	Name	Date of birth	Height	Position
1	(Poland) Szymon Biniek	30 July 1995	1.88 m (6 ft 2 in)	libero
2	(Poland) Jakub Szymański	25 March 1998	2.00 m (6 ft 7 in)	outside hitter
3	(Poland) Vlad Orobko	1 February 1999	1.90 m (6 ft 3 in)	outside hitter
4	(Poland) Przemysław Stępień	7 February 1994	1.85 m (6 ft 1 in)	setter
5	(Poland) Patryk Więckowski	27 March 1998	2.02 m (6 ft 8 in)	opposite
6	(Poland) Mariusz Schamlewski	16 January 1991	1.98 m (6 ft 6 in)	middle blocker
7	(Poland) Jakub Wachnik	16 February 1993	2.02 m (6 ft 8 in)	outside hitter
8	(Ukraine) Andriy Orobko	10 August 1997	2.01 m (6 ft 7 in)	middle blocker
9	(Russia) Alexey Nalobin	3 October 1989	2.05 m (6 ft 9 in)	middle blocker
10	(Poland) Maciej Pawliński	2 February 1983	1.93 m (6 ft 4 in)	outside hitter
11	(Poland) Michał Superlak	16 November 1993	2.06 m (6 ft 9 in)	opposite
12	(Serbia) Tomislav Dokić	27 February 1986	2.04 m (6 ft 8 in)	opposite
13	(Poland) Piotr Adamski	4 December 1991	1.95 m (6 ft 5 in)	setter
14	(Poland) Jacek Ziemnicki	30 May 1997	1.89 m (6 ft 2 in)	outside hitter
15	(Poland) Wojciech Dyk	21 May 1998	2.02 m (6 ft 8 in)	middle blocker
16	(Poland) Mateusz Czunkiewicz	16 December 1996	1.83 m (6 ft 0 in)	libero
17	(Poland) Łukasz Łapszyński	23 September 1993	1.94 m (6 ft 4 in)	outside hitter
18	(Poland) Grzegorz Duluk	21 January 1999	1.84 m (6 ft 0 in)	libero
19	(Poland) Bartosz Drewniak	30 April 1996	1.90 m (6 ft 3 in)	setter
20	(Belarus) Maksim Marozau	29 May 1989	2.06 m (6 ft 9 in)	middle blocker
Head coach:		(Poland) Wojciech Serafin → (Poland) Dariusz Daszkiewicz		

GKS Katowice
No.	Name	Date of birth	Height	Position
1	(Poland) Bartłomiej Krulicki	15 September 1993	2.05 m (6 ft 9 in)	middle blocker
2	(Poland) Adrian Stańczak	17 February 1987	1.85 m (6 ft 1 in)	libero
3	(Poland) Dominik Witczak	2 January 1983	1.98 m (6 ft 6 in)	opposite
4	(Poland) Marcin Komenda	24 May 1996	1.98 m (6 ft 6 in)	setter
6	(Poland) Karol Butryn	18 June 1993	1.94 m (6 ft 4 in)	opposite
7	(Ukraine) Serhiy Kapelus	22 October 1982	1.91 m (6 ft 3 in)	outside hitter
8	(Poland) Tomasz Kalembka	30 June 1991	2.05 m (6 ft 9 in)	middle blocker
9	(Poland) Paweł Pietraszko	5 October 1990	2.03 m (6 ft 8 in)	middle blocker
10	(Poland) Maciej Fijałek	7 August 1982	1.86 m (6 ft 1 in)	setter
12	(Slovakia) Emanuel Kohút	21 July 1982	2.04 m (6 ft 8 in)	middle blocker
14	(Poland) Bartosz Mariański	26 May 1992	1.87 m (6 ft 2 in)	libero
15	(Poland) Kacper Stelmach	5 May 1997	2.03 m (6 ft 8 in)	outside hitter
16	(Poland) Rafał Sobański	10 August 1991	1.95 m (6 ft 5 in)	outside hitter
19	(Argentina) Gonzalo Quiroga	25 February 1993	1.92 m (6 ft 4 in)	outside hitter
Head coach:		(Poland) Piotr Gruszka		

Indykpol AZS Olsztyn
No.	Name	Date of birth	Height	Position
1	(Poland) Mateusz Kańczok	3 June 1993	2.04 m (6 ft 8 in)	opposite
2	(Czech Republic) Jan Hadrava	3 June 1991	1.98 m (6 ft 6 in)	opposite
3	(Poland) Michał Żurek	3 June 1988	1.81 m (5 ft 11 in)	libero
4	(Poland) Daniel Pliński	10 December 1978	2.04 m (6 ft 8 in)	middle blocker
5	(Poland) Miłosz Zniszczoł	2 July 1986	2.01 m (6 ft 7 in)	middle blocker
6	(Netherlands) Robbert Andringa	28 April 1990	1.91 m (6 ft 3 in)	outside hitter
7	(Poland) Jakub Kochanowski	17 July 1997	1.99 m (6 ft 6 in)	middle blocker
10	(Poland) Łukasz Makowski	21 February 1989	1.87 m (6 ft 2 in)	setter
11	(Canada) Blake Scheerhoorn	6 January 1995	2.02 m (6 ft 8 in)	outside hitter
12	(Poland) Paweł Woicki	19 June 1983	1.82 m (6 ft 0 in)	setter
13	(Poland) Adrian Buchowski	30 September 1991	1.94 m (6 ft 4 in)	outside hitter
14	(Belgium) Tomas Rousseaux	31 March 1994	1.99 m (6 ft 6 in)	outside hitter
17	(Poland) Jakub Zabłocki	10 April 1995	1.80 m (5 ft 11 in)	libero
Head coach:		(Italy) Roberto Santilli		

Jastrzębski Węgiel
No.	Name	Date of birth	Height	Position
1	(Poland) Patryk Strzeżek	19 November 1989	2.03 m (6 ft 8 in)	opposite
2	(Poland) Maciej Muzaj	21 May 1994	2.08 m (6 ft 10 in)	opposite
3	(Poland) Jakub Popiwczak	17 April 1996	1.80 m (5 ft 11 in)	libero
4	(Poland) Grzegorz Kosok	2 March 1986	2.05 m (6 ft 9 in)	middle blocker
5	(Sweden) Dardan Lushtaku	5 February 1992	1.90 m (6 ft 3 in)	setter
6	(Poland) Damian Boruch	14 December 1989	2.09 m (6 ft 10 in)	middle blocker
7	(Argentina) Rodrigo Quiroga	23 March 1987	1.91 m (6 ft 3 in)	outside hitter
8	(Poland) Marcin Ernastowicz	31 July 1997	1.90 m (6 ft 3 in)	outside hitter
9	(Canada) Jason DeRocco	19 September 1989	2.01 m (6 ft 7 in)	outside hitter
10	(Germany) Lukas Kampa	29 November 1986	1.93 m (6 ft 4 in)	setter
11	(Poland) Wojciech Sobala	12 May 1988	2.07 m (6 ft 9 in)	middle blocker
12	(Poland) Karol Gdowski	10 February 1999	1.83 m (6 ft 0 in)	libero
13	(Cuba) Salvador Hidalgo Oliva	27 December 1985	1.95 m (6 ft 5 in)	outside hitter
17	(Poland) Jakub Turski	6 September 1998	2.02 m (6 ft 8 in)	middle blocker
Head coach:		(Australia) Mark Lebedew → (Italy) Ferdinando De Giorgi		

Łuczniczka Bydgoszcz
No.	Name	Date of birth	Height	Position
1	(Bulgaria) Metodi Ananiev	17 February 1986	2.03 m (6 ft 8 in)	outside hitter
2	(Poland) Jakub Rohnka	10 March 1992	1.95 m (6 ft 5 in)	outside hitter
3	(Puerto Rico) Edgardo Goás	27 January 1989	1.96 m (6 ft 5 in)	setter
4	(Poland) Wojciech Jurkiewicz	21 June 1977	2.05 m (6 ft 9 in)	middle blocker
5	(Poland) Kamil Reichel	19 September 1999	2.00 m (6 ft 7 in)	middle blocker
6	(Poland) Paweł Gryc	9 January 1996	2.08 m (6 ft 10 in)	opposite
7	(Poland) Michał Szalacha	15 January 1994	2.02 m (6 ft 8 in)	middle blocker
8	(Brazil) Henrique Batagim	1 August 1993	1.96 m (6 ft 5 in)	outside hitter
9	(Poland) Bartosz Filipiak	27 February 1994	1.97 m (6 ft 6 in)	opposite
10	(Poland) Adam Kowalski	16 September 1994	1.80 m (5 ft 11 in)	libero
12	(Greece) Yevgenii Gorchaniuk	11 October 1987	2.00 m (6 ft 7 in)	outside hitter
13	(Poland) Piotr Sieńko	8 December 1993	1.96 m (6 ft 5 in)	setter
14	(Poland) Krzysztof Bieńkowski	19 June 1995	1.98 m (6 ft 6 in)	setter
15	(Poland) Kacper Bobrowski	8 October 1997	1.90 m (6 ft 3 in)	outside hitter
16	(Poland) Filip Strojny	26 December 1999	1.84 m (6 ft 0 in)	setter
17	(Poland) Mateusz Sacharewicz	23 October 1989	1.98 m (6 ft 6 in)	middle blocker
18	(Poland) Wojciech Kowalski	28 January 1998	1.78 m (5 ft 10 in)	libero
19	(Poland) Patryk Akala	12 October 1988	2.01 m (6 ft 7 in)	middle blocker
Head coach:		(Poland) Jakub Bednaruk		

MKS Będzin
No.	Name	Date of birth	Height	Position
1	(Poland) Marcin Waliński	24 October 1990	1.95 m (6 ft 5 in)	outside hitter
2	(Poland) Dawid Woch	16 May 1997	2.00 m (6 ft 7 in)	middle blocker
4	(Poland) Łukasz Kozub	3 November 1997	1.86 m (6 ft 1 in)	setter
5	(Poland) Artur Ratajczak	18 September 1990	2.06 m (6 ft 9 in)	middle blocker
6	(Slovenia) Jan Klobučar	11 December 1992	1.95 m (6 ft 5 in)	outside hitter
7	(Poland) Mateusz Kowalski	20 February 1997	2.05 m (6 ft 9 in)	middle blocker
8	(United States) Jonah Seif	30 October 1994	2.05 m (6 ft 9 in)	setter
9	(Poland) Jakub Burnatowski	23 February 1998	1.90 m (6 ft 3 in)	setter
10	(Poland) Bartłomiej Grzechnik	8 February 1993	2.00 m (6 ft 7 in)	middle blocker
11	(Poland) Mateusz Przybyła	12 April 1991	2.08 m (6 ft 10 in)	middle blocker
13	(Poland) Michał Potera	6 March 1988	1.83 m (6 ft 0 in)	libero
14	(Poland) Jakub Peszko	1 April 1992	1.93 m (6 ft 4 in)	outside hitter
15	(Slovenia) Matej Kök	11 December 1996	1.98 m (6 ft 6 in)	outside hitter
16	(Poland) Rafał Faryna	28 September 1994	2.00 m (6 ft 7 in)	opposite
17	(Bulgaria) Zlatan Yordanov	2 March 1991	1.98 m (6 ft 6 in)	outside hitter
18	(Poland) Szymon Gregorowicz	7 March 1994	1.83 m (6 ft 0 in)	libero
20	(Brazil) Rafael Araújo	13 June 1991	2.07 m (6 ft 9 in)	opposite
Head coach:		(Canada) Stelio DeRocco → (Netherlands) Gido Vermeulen		

Onico Warsaw
No.	Name	Date of birth	Height	Position
1	(Poland) Jakub Kowalczyk	26 June 1986	2.00 m (6 ft 7 in)	middle blocker
2	(Poland) Bartosz Kwolek	17 July 1997	1.93 m (6 ft 4 in)	outside hitter
3	(Canada) Sharone Vernon-Evans	28 August 1998	2.02 m (6 ft 8 in)	opposite
6	(France) Antoine Brizard	22 May 1994	1.95 m (6 ft 5 in)	setter
7	(Poland) Jędrzej Gruszczyński	13 November 1997	1.86 m (6 ft 1 in)	libero
8	(Poland) Andrzej Wrona	27 December 1988	2.06 m (6 ft 9 in)	middle blocker
9	(France) Guillaume Samica	28 September 1981	1.97 m (6 ft 6 in)	outside hitter
12	(Poland) Sebastian Warda	18 January 1989	2.04 m (6 ft 8 in)	middle blocker
13	(Poland) Jan Firlej	26 September 1996	1.88 m (6 ft 2 in)	setter
14	(North Macedonia) Nikola Gjorgiev	23 July 1988	1.95 m (6 ft 5 in)	opposite
18	(Poland) Damian Wojtaszek	7 September 1988	1.80 m (5 ft 11 in)	libero
19	(Poland) Jan Nowakowski	17 May 1994	2.02 m (6 ft 8 in)	middle blocker
20	(Poland) Wojciech Włodarczyk	28 October 1990	2.00 m (6 ft 7 in)	outside hitter
Head coach:		(France) Stéphane Antiga		

PGE Skra Bełchatów
No.	Name	Date of birth	Height	Position
1	(Serbia) Srećko Lisinac	17 May 1992	2.05 m (6 ft 9 in)	middle blocker
2	(Poland) Mariusz Wlazły	4 August 1983	1.94 m (6 ft 4 in)	opposite
5	(Poland) Marcin Janusz	31 July 1994	1.95 m (6 ft 5 in)	setter
6	(Poland) Karol Kłos	8 August 1989	2.01 m (6 ft 7 in)	middle blocker
7	(Poland) Bartosz Bednorz	25 July 1994	2.01 m (6 ft 7 in)	outside hitter
8	(Serbia) Milan Katić	22 October 1993	2.01 m (6 ft 7 in)	outside hitter
9	(Poland) Patryk Czarnowski	1 November 1985	2.04 m (6 ft 8 in)	middle blocker
11	(Iran) Milad Ebadipour	17 October 1993	1.96 m (6 ft 5 in)	outside hitter
13	(Poland) Szymon Romać	1 October 1992	1.96 m (6 ft 5 in)	opposite
14	(Serbia) Aleksandar Nedeljković	27 October 1997	2.05 m (6 ft 9 in)	middle blocker
15	(Poland) Grzegorz Łomacz	1 October 1987	1.88 m (6 ft 2 in)	setter
16	(Poland) Kacper Piechocki	17 December 1995	1.85 m (6 ft 1 in)	libero
17	(Bulgaria) Nikolay Penchev	22 May 1992	1.96 m (6 ft 5 in)	outside hitter
18	(Poland) Robert Milczarek	28 November 1983	1.88 m (6 ft 2 in)	libero
Head coach:		(Italy) Roberto Piazza		

Stocznia Szczecin
No.	Name	Date of birth	Height	Position
1	(Poland) Janusz Gałązka	26 April 1987	1.99 m (6 ft 6 in)	middle blocker
2	(Poland) Bartłomiej Kluth	20 December 1992	2.10 m (6 ft 11 in)	opposite
3	(Canada) Justin Duff	10 May 1989	2.02 m (6 ft 8 in)	middle blocker
4	(Poland) Tomasz Kowalski	12 June 1991	2.02 m (6 ft 8 in)	setter
5	(Poland) Adrian Kacperkiewicz	27 April 1998	1.85 m (6 ft 1 in)	outside hitter
6	(Poland) Mateusz Malinowski	6 May 1992	1.98 m (6 ft 6 in)	opposite
7	(Poland) Marcin Jaskuła	11 February 1998	1.79 m (5 ft 10 in)	libero
10	(Poland) Dawid Murek	24 July 1977	1.95 m (6 ft 5 in)	libero
11	(Poland) Michał Ruciak	22 August 1983	1.90 m (6 ft 3 in)	outside hitter
13	(Poland) Marcin Wika	9 November 1983	1.94 m (6 ft 4 in)	outside hitter
14	(Finland) Eemi Tervaportti	26 July 1989	1.93 m (6 ft 4 in)	setter
17	(Poland) Bartosz Gawryszewski	22 August 1985	2.02 m (6 ft 8 in)	middle blocker
18	(Poland) Adrian Mihułka	10 July 1989	1.82 m (6 ft 0 in)	libero
19	(United States) Jeffrey Menzel	31 October 1988	1.97 m (6 ft 6 in)	outside hitter
Head coach:		(Poland) Michał Mieszko Gogol		

Trefl Gdańsk
No.	Name	Date of birth	Height	Position
1	(Poland) Piotr Nowakowski	18 December 1987	2.05 m (6 ft 9 in)	middle blocker
2	(Poland) Wojciech Grzyb	4 January 1981	2.05 m (6 ft 9 in)	middle blocker
3	(Canada) TJ Sanders	14 December 1991	1.91 m (6 ft 3 in)	setter
5	(Poland) Wojciech Ferens	5 April 1991	1.94 m (6 ft 4 in)	outside hitter
6	(Poland) Szymon Jakubiszak	13 February 1998	2.08 m (6 ft 10 in)	outside hitter
7	(Poland) Damian Schulz	26 February 1990	2.08 m (6 ft 10 in)	opposite
9	(Poland) Patryk Niemiec	18 February 1997	2.02 m (6 ft 8 in)	middle blocker
10	(United States) Daniel McDonnell	15 September 1988	2.00 m (6 ft 7 in)	middle blocker
11	(Poland) Jan Tomczak	5 September 1995	1.88 m (6 ft 2 in)	setter
12	(Poland) Artur Szalpuk	20 March 1995	2.01 m (6 ft 7 in)	outside hitter
14	(Poland) Maciej Olenderek	16 October 1992	1.78 m (5 ft 10 in)	libero
15	(Poland) Mateusz Mika	21 January 1991	2.06 m (6 ft 9 in)	outside hitter
16	(Poland) Fabian Majcherski	28 March 1997	1.75 m (5 ft 9 in)	libero
18	(Poland) Michał Kozłowski	16 February 1985	1.91 m (6 ft 3 in)	setter
19	(Canada) Bradley Gunter	5 December 1993	1.98 m (6 ft 6 in)	opposite
Head coach:		(Italy) Andrea Anastasi		

ZAKSA Kędzierzyn-Koźle
No.	Name	Date of birth	Height	Position
1	(Poland) Paweł Zatorski	21 June 1990	1.84 m (6 ft 0 in)	libero
3	(Poland) Rafał Szymura	29 August 1995	1.97 m (6 ft 6 in)	outside hitter
4	(Poland) Krzysztof Rejno	22 February 1993	2.03 m (6 ft 8 in)	middle blocker
5	(Italy) Marco Falaschi	18 September 1987	1.87 m (6 ft 2 in)	setter
6	(France) Benjamin Toniutti	30 October 1989	1.83 m (6 ft 0 in)	setter
7	(Poland) Rafał Buszek	28 April 1987	1.96 m (6 ft 5 in)	outside hitter
8	(Poland) Sławomir Jungiewicz	21 June 1989	1.96 m (6 ft 5 in)	opposite
9	(Poland) Łukasz Wiśniewski	3 February 1989	1.98 m (6 ft 6 in)	middle blocker
10	(Poland) Mateusz Bieniek	5 April 1994	2.08 m (6 ft 10 in)	middle blocker
11	(Puerto Rico) Maurice Torres	6 July 1991	2.01 m (6 ft 7 in)	opposite
12	(Poland) Krzysztof Zapłacki	8 August 1993	1.97 m (6 ft 6 in)	outside hitter
13	(Poland) Kamil Semeniuk	16 July 1996	1.94 m (6 ft 4 in)	outside hitter
15	(Belgium) Sam Deroo	24 April 1992	2.03 m (6 ft 8 in)	outside hitter
17	(Poland) Aleksander Maziarz	22 April 1995	2.04 m (6 ft 8 in)	middle blocker
18	(Poland) Korneliusz Banach	25 January 1994	1.84 m (6 ft 0 in)	libero
Head coach:		(Italy) Andrea Gardini		

== See also ==
- 2017–18 CEV Champions League
- 2017–18 CEV Cup
