= Grzegorz Łomacz =

Polish volleyball player (born 1987)

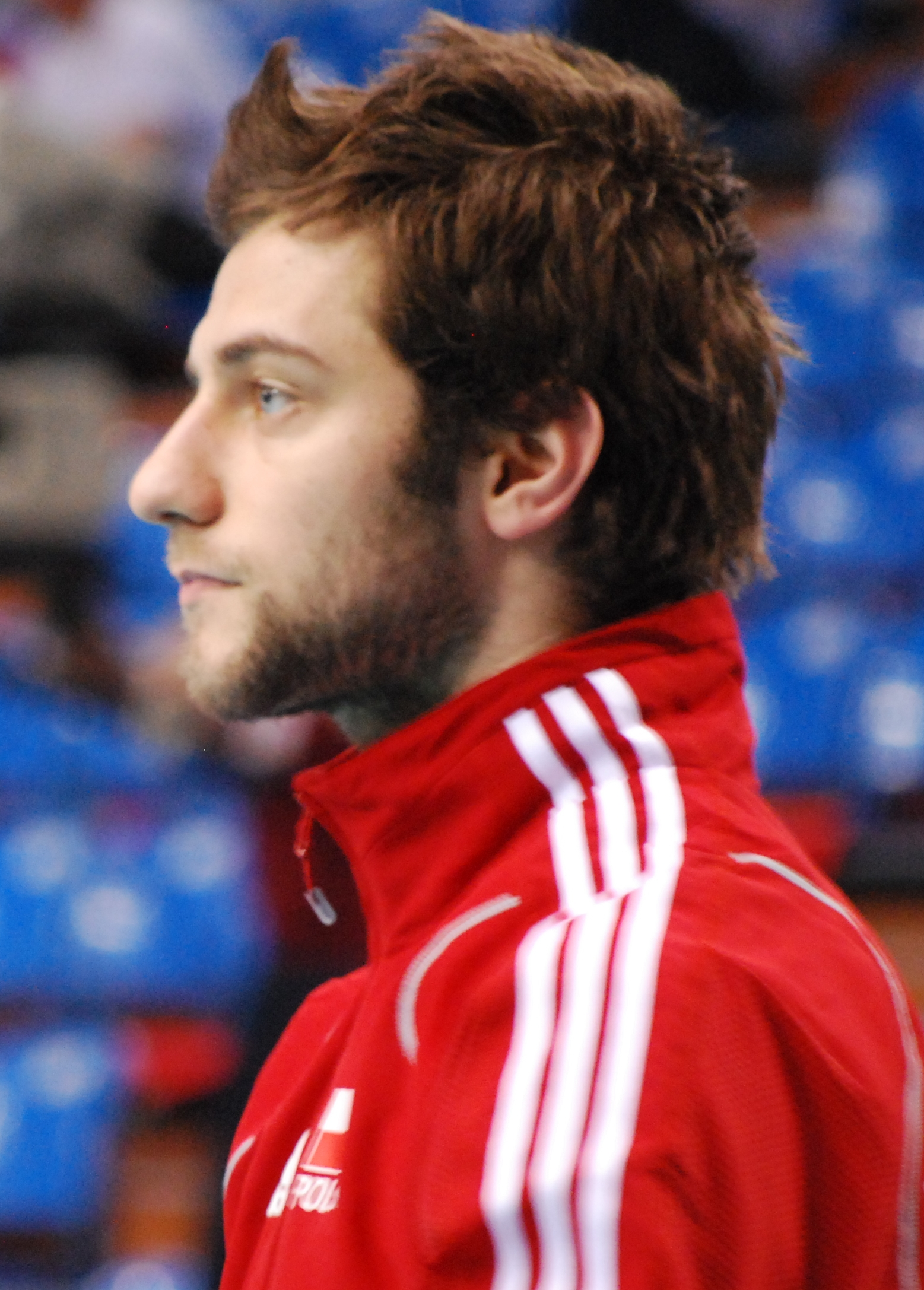
- Łomacz in 2010

Personal information
- Born: 1 October 1987 (age 39); Ostrołęka, Poland
- Height: 1.88 m (6 ft 2 in)
- Weight: 80 kg (176 lb)
- Spike: 336 cm (132 in)
- Block: 315 cm (124 in)

Volleyball information
- Position: Setter
- Current club: Skra Bełchatów
- Number: 12

Career
Years	Teams
2006–2007; 2007–2011; 2011–2014; 2014–2017; 2017–	AZS Politechnika Warszawska; Jastrzębski Węgiel; Trefl Gdańsk; Cuprum Lubin; Skra Bełchatów

National team
2009–	Poland
Honours
Men's volleyball
Representing Poland
Olympic Games
Silver medal – second place	2024 Paris	Team
FIVB World Championship
Gold medal – first place	2018 Bulgaria/Italy
Silver medal – second place	2022 Poland/Slovenia
FIVB World Cup
Bronze medal – third place	2015 Japan
FIVB Nations League
Gold medal – first place	2023 Gdańsk
Silver medal – second place	2021 Rimini
Bronze medal – third place	2022 Bologna
Bronze medal – third place	2024 Łódź
CEV European Championship
Gold medal – first place	2023 Italy/Bulgaria/North Macedonia/Israel
Bronze medal – third place	2021 Poland/Czechia/Estonia/Finland

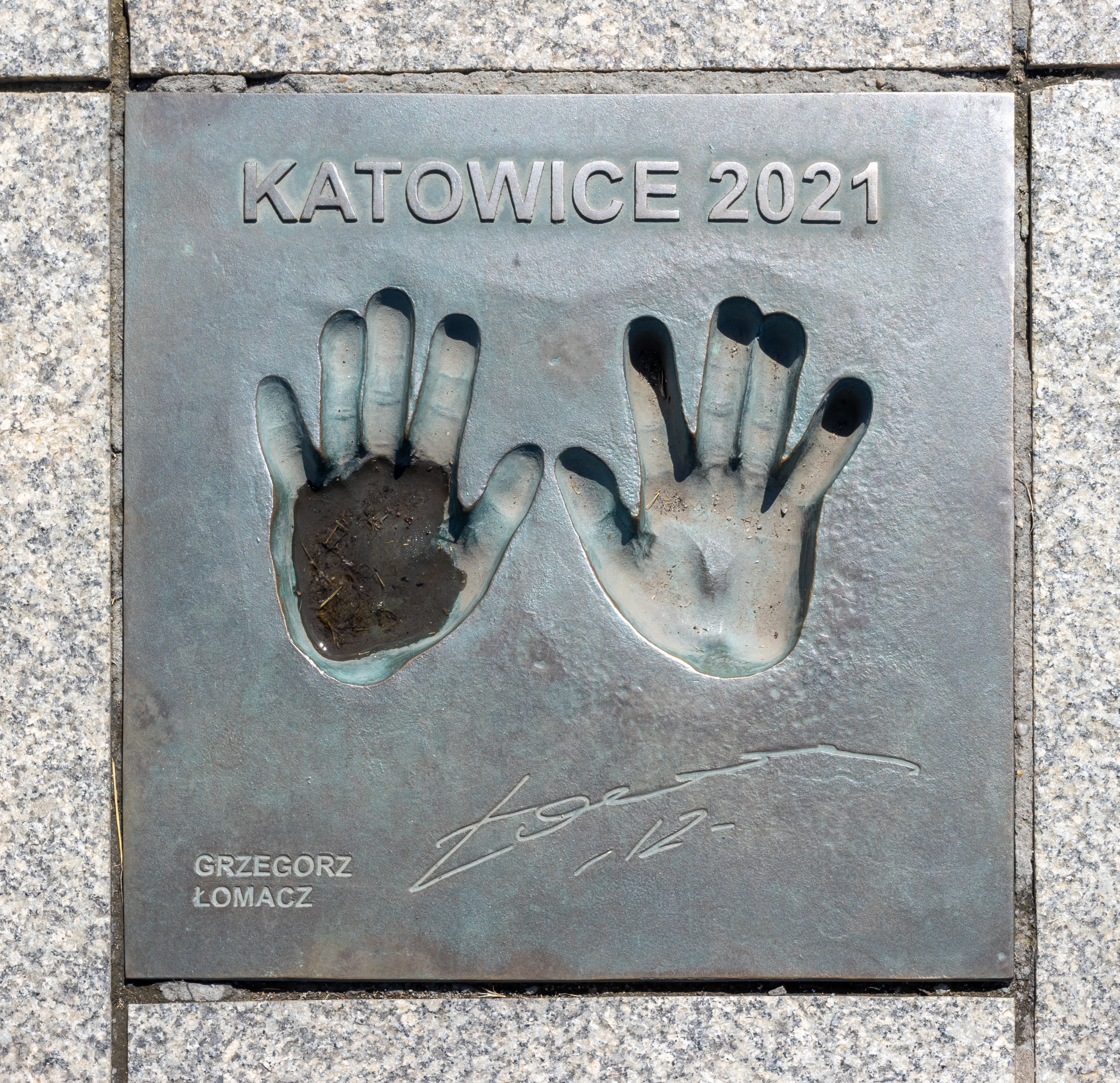
Hand prints and signature at the Avenue of Volleyball Stars, Katowice

Grzegorz Łomacz (born 1 October 1987) is a Polish professional volleyball player who plays as a setter for Skra Bełchatów and the Poland national team. With Poland, Łomacz won the 2018 World Champion title and took part in 3 Olympic Games – Rio 2016, Tokyo 2020 and Paris 2024, winning a silver medal at the latter.

== Career ==
=== Club ===
Łomacz is a silver medallist of the 2013 Summer Universiade held in Kazan. For 3 seasons, he was a player and captain of Trefl Gdańsk. In 2014, he signed a contract with Cuprum Lubin. After a good season and 6th place in PlusLiga, he decided to leave the club from Lubin. On 27 April 2017, it was announced that Łomacz signed a two–year contract with Skra Bełchatów.

=== National team ===
On 30 September 2018, Poland achieved its third title of the World Champion. Poland beat Brazil in the final 3-0 and defended the title from 2014.

On 10 August 2024, he won the silver medal at the 2024 Summer Olympic Games in Paris.

== Honours ==
=== Club ===
- CEV Challenge Cup
  - 2008–09 – with Jastrzębski Węgiel
- Domestic
  - 2009–10 Polish Cup, with Jastrzębski Węgiel
  - 2017–18 Polish SuperCup, with PGE Skra Bełchatów
  - 2017–18 Polish Championship, with PGE Skra Bełchatów
  - 2018–19 Polish SuperCup, with PGE Skra Bełchatów

=== Youth national team ===
- 2005 CEV U19 European Championship

=== Universiade ===
- 2013 Summer Universiade

=== State awards ===
- 2018: Gold Cross of Merit
- 2024: Knight's Cross of Polonia Restituta
