= Mariusz Wlazły =

Polish volleyball player (born 1983)

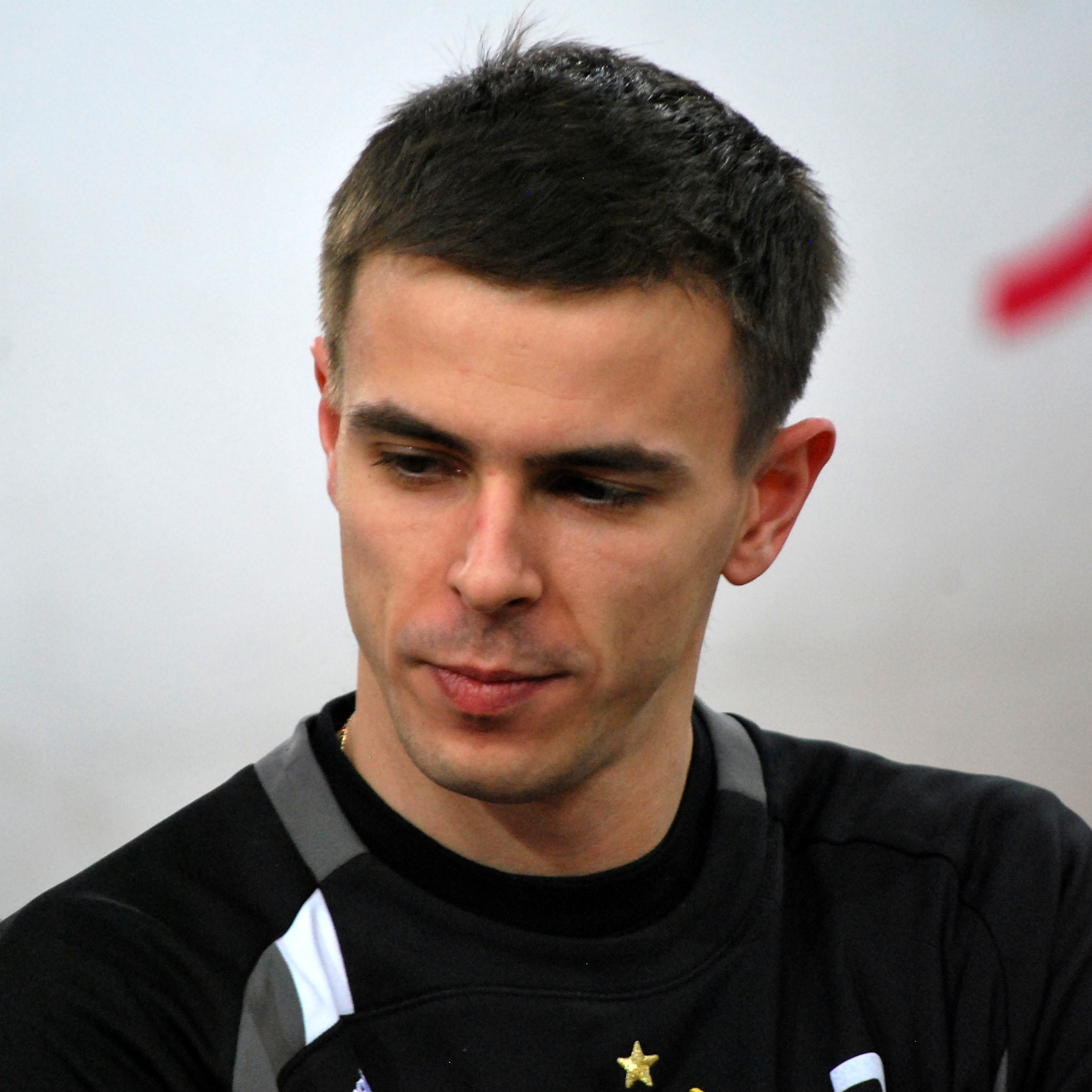

Personal information
- Full name: Mariusz Łukasz Wlazły
- Nickname: Mario, Szampon
- Born: 4 August 1983 (age 43); Wieluń, Poland
- Height: 1.94 m (6 ft 4 in)

Volleyball information
- Position: Opposite / Outside hitter

Career
Years	Teams
2003–2020; 2015; 2020–2023	Skra Bełchatów; Al Arabi Doha; Trefl Gdańsk

National team
2005–2014	Poland (155)
Honours
Men's volleyball
Representing Poland
FIVB World Championship
Gold medal – first place	2014 Poland
Silver medal – second place	2006 Japan

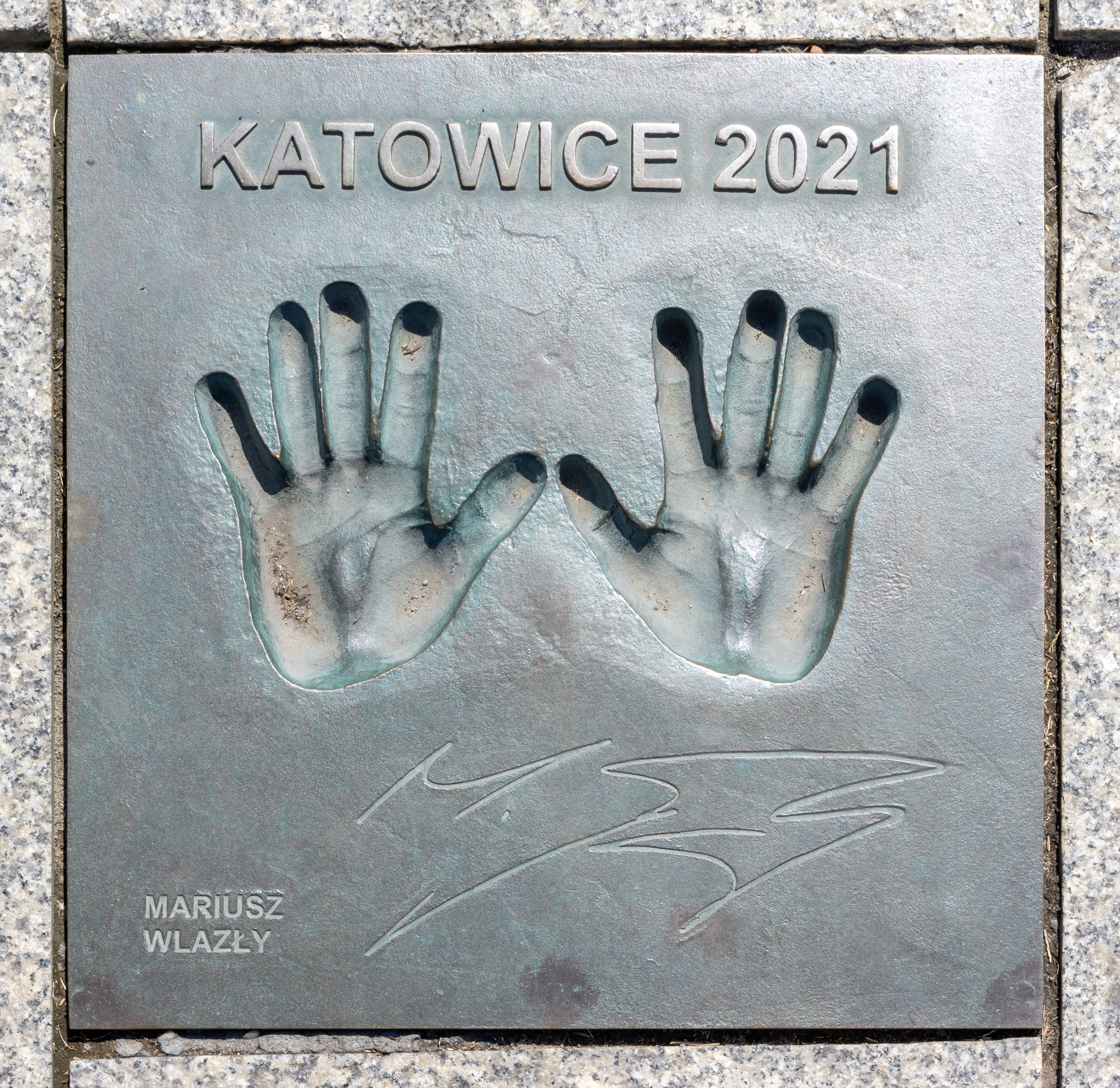
Hand prints and signature at the Avenue of Volleyball Stars, Katowice

Mariusz Łukasz Wlazły (born 4 August 1983) is a Polish former professional volleyball player. He was a member of the Poland national team from 2005 to 2014, a participant in the Olympic Games Beijing 2008 and the 2014 World Champion. Wlazły spent most of his career in Skra Bełchatów, the club with which he won 9 league titles and multiple medals in international competitions.

== Personal life ==
Mariusz Wlazły was born in Wieluń, Poland. On 17 June 2006, Mariusz married Paulina (née Drewicz). On 13 January 2009, his wife gave birth to their first child, a son named Arkadiusz. On 23 November 2015, their second son was born. In February 2017, he graduated from the Academy of Management and Administration in Opole with master's degree in sports marketing.

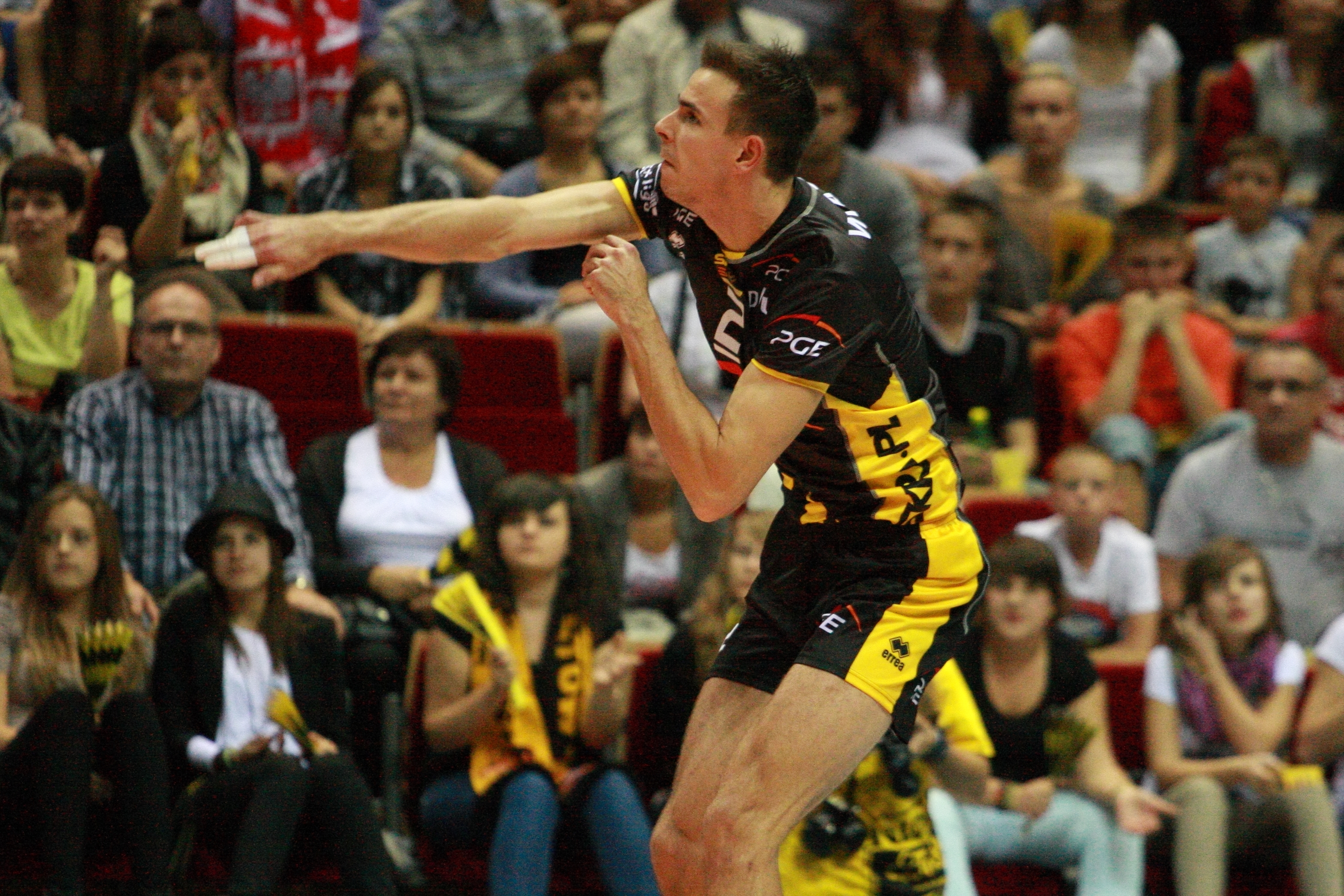
As the server in the match PGE Skra Bełchatów against LOTOS Trefl Gdańsk on 30 September 2011.

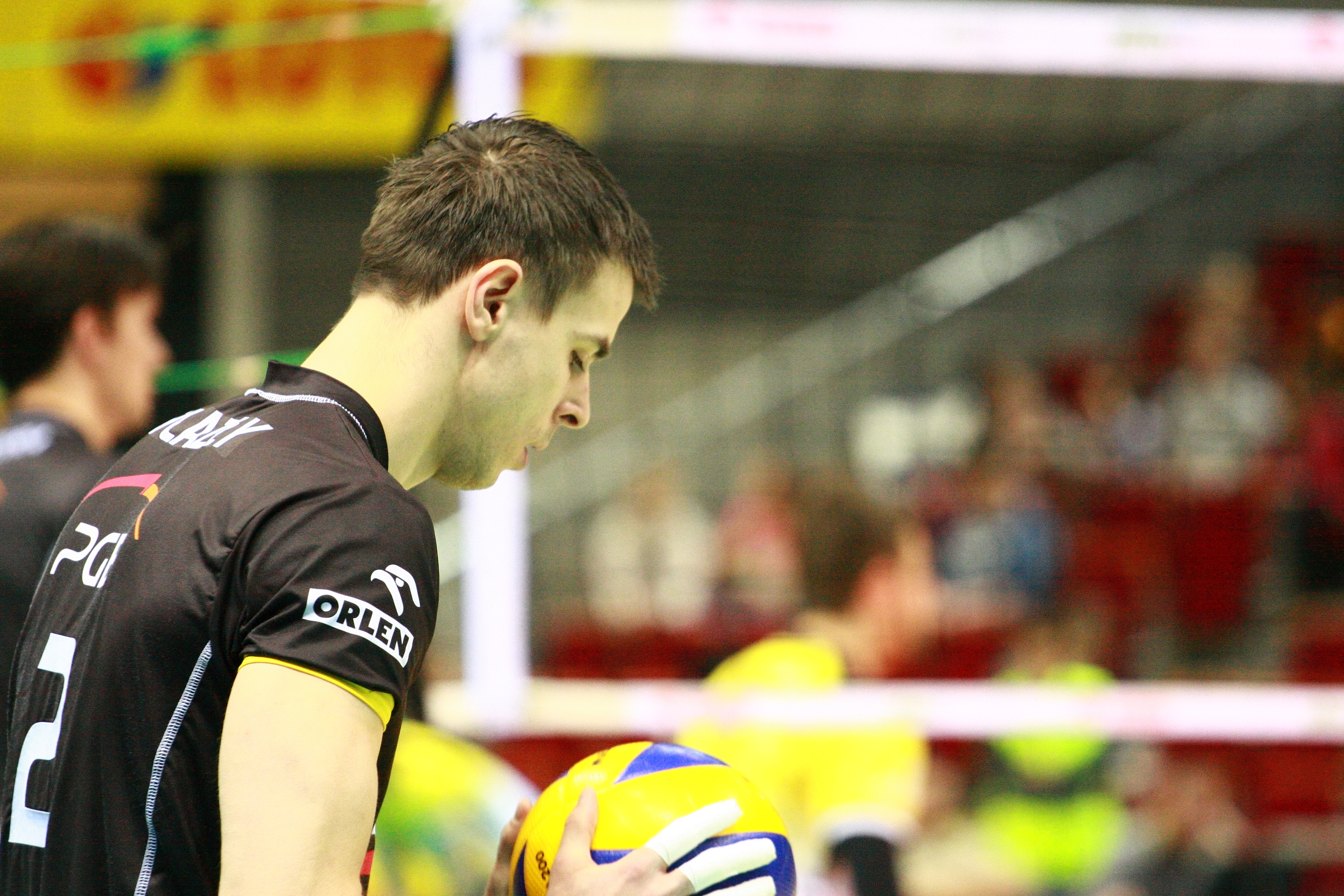
Wlazły during the match PGE Skra Bełchatów vs LOTOS Trefl Gdańsk on 17 March 2013.

== Career ==
=== Club ===
Wlazły played in Skra Bełchatów for over 10 years. During that time he won eight titles of the Polish Champion (2005, 2006, 2007, 2008, 2009, 2010, 2011, 2014). With PGE Skra, he won a bronze medal at the 2007–08 CEV Champions League, and was also individually awarded as the Best spiker of the tournament. He won a bronze medal at the 2009–10 CEV Champions League, playing with Skra Bełchatów and was awarded as the Best scorer. Mariusz win a silver medal and the Most Valuable Player award in the CEV Champions League 2011/2012. He has two silver medals from the Club World Championships in 2009 and 2010, and one bronze medal in 2012. In 2014, he won his 8th title of the Polish Champion with Skra. On 8 October 2014, his team won the Polish SuperCup . His club played in the Final four of the 2014–15 CEV Champions League, but lost in the semifinal to Asseco Resovia, and in a match for third place to Berlin Recycling Volleys, and did not achieve any medal. In May 2015, he signed a contract with Qatari club Al Arabi Doha for the duration of the Emir Cup (only 2 matches). All the money earned in Qatar, Mariusz Wlazły decided to transfer to his own foundation. On 7 February 2016, he won the Polish Cup after beating ZAKSA in the final.

=== National team ===
He was a member of the Polish national team, which won the title of the U21 World Champion. He made his debut in the senior national team during 2004 summer season and by FIVB World League 2005 he had already established himself as one of the most important players of the national team. In 2006, he won second place at the FIVB World Championship held in Japan. During that tournament he was nominated for the Most Valuable Player award, losing only to Brazilian star Giba. In 2010 he gave up playing for Polish national team because of a conflict with management.

On 8 April 2014, Wlazły was appointed to the Polish national team after 4 years of absence, by the head coach Stéphane Antiga. On 16 August 2014, he was appointed to the squad at the World Championship held in Poland. On 21 September 2014, Poland, including Wlazły, won a title of the World Champion. He received two individual awards for the Best opposite spiker and Most valuable player of the tournament. On the day of winning the gold medal, Wlazły announced his retirement from the national team. On 27 October 2014, he received a state award granted by the Polish President Bronisław Komorowski – Officer's Cross of Polonia Restituta for outstanding sports achievements, and promotion of Poland in the world.

== Honours ==
=== Club ===
- CEV Champions League
  - 2011–12 – with PGE Skra Bełchatów
- FIVB Club World Championship
  - Doha 2009 – with PGE Skra Bełchatów
  - Doha 2010 – with PGE Skra Bełchatów
- Domestic
  - 2004–05 Polish Cup, with Skra Bełchatów
  - 2004–05 Polish Championship, with Skra Bełchatów
  - 2005–06 Polish Cup, with BOT Skra Bełchatów
  - 2005–06 Polish Championship, with BOT Skra Bełchatów
  - 2006–07 Polish Cup, with BOT Skra Bełchatów
  - 2006–07 Polish Championship, with BOT Skra Bełchatów
  - 2007–08 Polish Championship, with PGE Skra Bełchatów
  - 2008–09 Polish Cup, with PGE Skra Bełchatów
  - 2008–09 Polish Championship, with PGE Skra Bełchatów
  - 2009–10 Polish Championship, with PGE Skra Bełchatów
  - 2010–11 Polish Cup, with PGE Skra Bełchatów
  - 2010–11 Polish Championship, with PGE Skra Bełchatów
  - 2011–12 Polish Cup, with PGE Skra Bełchatów
  - 2012–13 Polish SuperCup, with PGE Skra Bełchatów
  - 2013–14 Polish Championship, with PGE Skra Bełchatów
  - 2014–15 Polish SuperCup, with PGE Skra Bełchatów
  - 2015–16 Polish Cup, with PGE Skra Bełchatów
  - 2017–18 Polish SuperCup, with PGE Skra Bełchatów
  - 2017–18 Polish Championship, with PGE Skra Bełchatów
  - 2018–19 Polish SuperCup, with PGE Skra Bełchatów

=== Youth national team ===
- 2003 FIVB U21 World Championship

=== Individual awards ===
- 2004: Polish Cup – Best spiker
- 2006: Polish Cup – Best spiker
- 2007: Polish Cup – Best spiker
- 2008: CEV Champions League – Best spiker
- 2009: Polish Cup – Best spiker
- 2009: Polish Cup – Most valuable player
- 2010: CEV Champions League – Best scorer
- 2011: Polish Cup – Best server
- 2011: Polish Cup – Most valuable player
- 2012: Polish Cup – Best server
- 2012: CEV Champions League – Most valuable player
- 2012: Polish SuperCup – Most valuable player
- 2014: FIVB World Championship – Best opposite spiker
- 2014: FIVB World Championship – Most valuable player
- 2015: Best Athlete in the World in 2014 (according to SportAccord)
- 2016: Polish Cup – Best opposite spiker
- 2016: Polish Cup – Most valuable player

=== State awards ===
- 2006: Gold Cross of Merit
- 2014: Officer's Cross of Polonia Restituta

=== Statistics ===
- 2013–14 PlusLiga – Best scorer (520 points)
- 2013–14 PlusLiga – Best server (66 aces)
- 2017–18 PlusLiga – Best server (61 aces)

Awards
Preceded by (Italy) Alessandro Paparoni	Best Spiker of CEV Champions League; 2007/2008	Succeeded by (Czech Republic) Martin Lébl
Preceded by (Germany) Jochen Schöps	Best Scorer of CEV Champions League; 2009/2010	Succeeded by (Russia) Maxim Mikhaylov
Preceded by (Cuba) Osmany Juantorena	Most Valuable Player of CEV Champions League; 2011/2012	Succeeded by (Sweden) Marcus Nilsson
Preceded by (Russia) Maxim Mikhaylov	Best Opposite Spiker of FIVB World Championship; 2014	Succeeded by (United States) Matt Anderson
Preceded by (Brazil) Murilo Endres	Most Valuable Player of FIVB World Championship; 2014	Succeeded by (Poland) Bartosz Kurek
