= Szymon Romać =

Polish volleyball player (born 1992)

Personal information
- Nationality: Polish
- Born: 1 October 1992 (age 34); Lubin, Poland
- Height: 1.96 m (6 ft 5 in)
- Weight: 98 kg (216 lb)
- Spike: 355 cm (140 in)

Volleyball information
- Position: Opposite
- Current club: LUK Lublin
- Number: 10

Career
Years	Teams
2011–2012; 2012–2014; 2014–2016; 2016–2017; 2017–2018; 2018–2020; 2020–	Cuprum Lubin; MCKiS Jaworzno; Cuprum Lubin; Trefl Gdańsk; Skra Bełchatów; Cambrai Volley; LUK Lublin
Honours
Men's volleyball
Representing Poland
European League
Bronze medal – third place	2015 Poland

Szymon Romać (born 1 October 1992) is a Polish professional volleyball player, a bronze medallist at the 2015 European League, and the 2018 Polish Champion. At the professional club level, he plays for LUK Lublin.

== Honours ==
=== Club ===
- National championships
  - 2017–18 Polish SuperCup, with PGE Skra Bełchatów
  - 2017–18 Polish Championship, with PGE Skra Bełchatów
