= Stocznia Szczecin =

Polish volleyball club

KPS Stocznia Szczecin
- Full name: Klub Piłki Siatkowej; Stocznia Szczecin
- Short name: Stocznia Szczecin
- Founded: 2014
- Dissolved: 2018
- Ground: Netto Arena ul. Władysława Szafera 3/5/7; 71–245 Szczecin (Capacity: 5,027)

KPS Stocznia Szczecin – was a professional men's volleyball club based in Szczecin in northwestern Poland, founded in 2014 under the name Espadon Szczecin. The club used to compete in PlusLiga, having been promoted to the highest level of the Polish Volleyball League in 2016.

== History ==
In 2014, the club was founded by former volleyball player and owner of Espadon company, Jakub Markiewicz. The club, continued the tradition of volleyball in Szczecin, after previous club representing the city in the past – Morze Bałtyk Szczecin. In 2014, Espadon Szczecin took over assets, liabilities and paid off Morze Bałtyk Szczecin debts. In 2015, Espadon Szczecin joined PlusLiga and made its debut in the match with ZAKSA Kędzierzyn-Koźle on 30 September 2016. In December 2016, Michał Mieszko Gogol became the new head coach of the club. In April 2018, a few matches before the end of the regular round of the 2017–18 PlusLiga, the club changed its name to Stocznia Szczecin. By the end of 2018, the club due to financial problems had to withdraw from the further competition.

== Former names ==
Years	Name
2014–2018	KS Espadon Szczecin
2018	KPS Stocznia Szczecin
