= Srećko Lisinac =

Serbian volleyball player (born 1992)

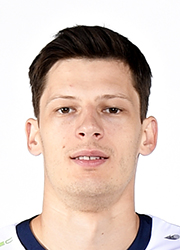

Personal information
- Born: 17 May 1992 (age 34); Kraljevo, Serbia, FR Yugoslavia
- Height: 2.05 m (6 ft 9 in)
- Weight: 96 kg (212 lb)
- Spike: 370 cm (146 in)
- Block: 355 cm (140 in)

Volleyball information
- Position: Middle blocker

Career
Years	Teams
2009–2012; 2012–2013; 2013–2014; 2014–2018; 2018–2023; 2023–2024	Ribnica Kraljevo; AZS Częstochowa; Berlin Recycling Volleys; Skra Bełchatów; Trentino Volley; Projekt Warsaw

National team
2012–	Serbia
Honours
Men's volleyball
Representing Serbia
FIVB World League
Gold medal – first place	2016 Kraków
Silver medal – second place	2015 Rio de Janeiro
CEV European Championship
Gold medal – first place	2019 Belgium/France/Netherlands/Slovenia
Bronze medal – third place	2013 Denmark/Poland
Bronze medal – third place	2017 Poland

Srećko Lisinac (Serbian Cyrillic: Срећко Лисинац; born 17 May 1992) is a Serbian former professional volleyball player who played as a middle blocker. He is a former member of the Serbia national team.

== Career ==
=== Club ===
In the 2013–14 Bundesliga season, Lisinac won the German Champion title with Berlin Recycling Volleys.

In 2014, he moved to PGE Skra Bełchatów, where he spent 4 seasons. On 8 October 2014, his team won the Polish SuperCup. On 7 February 2016, they won the Polish Cup and Lisinac himself was named the Best blocker of the tournament. In his final season with Skra, he won his second Polish SuperCup and the 2017–18 PlusLiga, besting ZAKSA on both occasions.

In 2018, Lisinac moved to Italy and joined Trentino Volley.

After five seasons in Italy, Lisinac signed with Projekt Warsaw and returned to Poland for the 2023–24 PlusLiga season.

=== National team ===
In 2015, the national team of Serbia, including Lisinac, made it to the final of the World League, where they eventually lost to France. Lisinac received an individual award for the Best middle blocker of the competition (ex-aequo with Maxwell Holt).

== Honours ==
=== Club ===
- CEV Champions League
  - 2020–21 – with Itas Trentino
- FIVB Club World Championship
  - Poland 2018 – with Trentino Volley
  - Brazil 2022 – with Itas Trentino
- CEV Cup
  - 2018–19 – with Itas Trentino
- CEV Challenge Cup
  - 2023–24 – with Projekt Warsaw
- Domestic
  - 2013–14 German Championship, with Berlin Recycling Volleys
  - 2014–15 Polish SuperCup, with PGE Skra Bełchatów
  - 2015–16 Polish Cup, with PGE Skra Bełchatów
  - 2017–18 Polish SuperCup, with PGE Skra Bełchatów
  - 2017–18 Polish Championship, with PGE Skra Bełchatów
  - 2021–22 Italian SuperCup, with Itas Trentino
  - 2022–23 Italian Championship, with Itas Trentino

=== Youth national team ===
- 2013 FIVB U23 World Championship

=== Individual awards ===
- 2013: CEV European Championship – Best blocker
- 2015: FIVB World League – Best middle blocker
- 2016: Polish Cup – Best blocker
- 2016: FIVB World League – Best middle blocker
- 2017: CEV European Championship – Best middle blocker
- 2018: Polish Cup – Best blocker
- 2019: CEV European Championship – Best middle blocker

Awards
Preceded by (Serbia) Marko Podraščanin	Best Middle Blocker of CEV European Championship; 2013; 2017 ex aequo (Germany) Marcus Böhme; 2019 ex aequo (Slovenia) Jan Kozamernik	Succeeded by (Serbia) Marko Podraščanin (Poland) Piotr Nowakowski
Preceded by (United States) David Lee (Brazil) Lucas Saatkamp	Best Middle Blocker of FIVB World League; 2015 ex aequo (United States) Maxwell Holt; 2016 ex aequo (Brazil) Maurício Souza	Succeeded by (France) Kévin Le Roux (Canada) Graham Vigrass
