= Milan Katić =

Serbian volleyball player (born 1993)

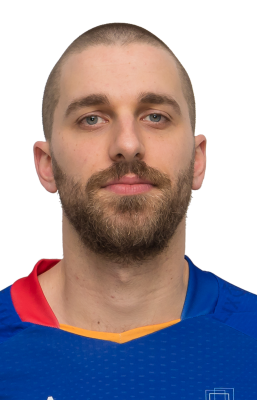

Personal information
- Born: 22 October 1993 (age 33); Belgrade, Serbia, FR Yugoslavia
- Height: 2.02 m (6 ft 8 in)
- Weight: 99 kg (218 lb)
- Spike: 350 cm (138 in)
- Block: 325 cm (128 in)

Volleyball information
- Position: Outside hitter
- Current club: Gazprom-Ugra Surgut
- Number: 5

Career
Years	Teams
2009–2015; 2015–2016; 2016–2017; 2017–2021; 2021; 2021–2022; 2022–	Vojvodina Novi Sad; Galatasaray İstanbul; Łuczniczka Bydgoszcz; Skra Bełchatów; LUK Lublin; Vero Volley Monza; Gazprom-Ugra Surgut

National team
2014–	Serbia
Honours
Men's volleyball
Representing Serbia
FIVB World League
Gold medal – first place	2016 Kraków
CEV European Championship
Bronze medal – third place	2017 Poland

Milan Katić (Serbian Cyrillic: Милан Катић; born 22 October 1993) is a Serbian professional volleyball player who plays as an outside hitter for Gazprom-Ugra Surgut and the Serbia national team.

== Honours ==
=== Club ===
- CEV Cup
  - 2021–22 – with Vero Volley Monza
- CEV Challenge Cup
  - 2014–15 – with Vojvodina Novi Sad
- Domestic
  - 2009–10 Serbian Cup, with Vojvodina Novi Sad
  - 2011–12 Serbian Cup, with Vojvodina Novi Sad
  - 2014–15 Serbian Cup, with Vojvodina Novi Sad
  - 2017–18 Polish SuperCup, with PGE Skra Bełchatów
  - 2017–18 Polish Championship, with PGE Skra Bełchatów
  - 2018–19 Polish SuperCup, with PGE Skra Bełchatów

=== Youth national team ===
- 2011 CEV U19 European Championship
- 2011 FIVB U19 World Championship
