= 2013–14 PGE Skra Bełchatów season =

PGE Skra Bełchatów
2013–14 season
- Chairman: Konrad Piechocki
- Manager: Miguel Falasca
- Polish Championship: (8th title)

PGE Skra Bełchatów 2013–2014 season is the 2013/2014 volleyball season for Polish professional volleyball club PGE Skra Bełchatów. The club won 8th title of Polish Champion, lost in semifinal of CEV Cup and Polish Cup.

The club competed in:

- Polish Championship
- Polish Cup
- CEV Cup

== Team roster ==
Head coach:	Miguel Angel Falasca
Assistant:	Fabio Storti
Coach of physical preparation:	Daniel Lecouna
Doctor:	Wojciech Łucarz
Physiotherapists:	Michał Woźniak, Tomasz Kuciapiński
Scoutman:	Fabio Gabban
Manager:	Sebastian Gaszek

No.	Name	Date of birth	Position
2	(Poland) Mariusz Wlazły (C)	August 4, 1983	opposite
4	(Poland) Daniel Pliński	December 10, 1978	middle blocker
5	(France) Samuel Tuia	July 24, 1986	outside hitter
6	(Poland) Karol Kłos	August 8, 1989	middle blocker
7	(Argentina) Facundo Conte	August 25, 1989	outside hitter
8	(Poland) Andrzej Wrona	December 27, 1988	middle blocker
9	(Poland) Maciej Muzaj	May 21, 1994	opposite
10	(Argentina) Nicolás Uriarte	March 21, 1990	setter
11	(France) Stéphane Antiga	February 3, 1976	outside hitter
12	(Poland) Wojciech Włodarczyk	October 28, 1990	outside hitter
15	(Serbia) Aleksa Brđović	July 29, 1993	setter
16	(Poland) Paweł Zatorski	June 21, 1990	libero
17	(Poland) Jędrzej Maćkowiak	October 17, 1992	middle blocker

== Squad changes for the 2013–2014 season ==
In:

No.	Player	Position	From
	(Spain) Miguel Angel Falasca	head coach	Ural Ufa
5	(France) Samuel Tuia	outside hitter	Kuzbass Kemerovo
7	(Argentina) Facundo Conte	outside hitter	Dinamo Krasnodar
8	(Poland) Andrzej Wrona	middle blocker	Delecta Bydgoszcz
10	(Argentina) Nicolás Uriarte	setter	Buenos Aires Unidos
11	(France) Stéphane Antiga	outside hitter	Delecta Bydgoszcz
12	(Poland) Wojciech Włodarczyk	outside hitter	SK Posojilnica Aich/Dob
15	(Serbia) Aleksa Brđović	setter	OK Partizan

Out:

No.	Player	Position	To
	(Poland) Jacek Nawrocki	head coach
5	(Netherlands) Wytze Kooistra	middle blocker	Cerrad Czarni Radom
8	(Serbia) Konstantin Čupković	outside hitter	Sir Safety Perugia
10	(Italy) Dante Boninfante	setter	Marmi Lanza Verona
12	(Poland) Paweł Woicki	setter	Delecta Bydgoszcz
13	(Poland) Michał Winiarski	outside hitter	Fakel Novy Urengoy
14	(Serbia) Aleksandar Atanasijević	opposite	Sir Safety Perugia
18	(Poland) Michał Bąkiewicz	outside hitter	AZS Częstochowa

== Most Valuable Players ==
No.	Opponent	Date	Player
1.	Lotos Trefl Gdańsk	12.10.2013	(Poland) Paweł Zatorski
2.	Effector Kielce	20.10.2013	(France) Stephane Antiga
3.	Indykpol AZS Olsztyn	27.10.2013	(Poland) Mariusz Wlazły
4.	Cerrad Czarni Radom	02.11.2013	(Netherlands) Wytze Kooistra
5.	Asseco Resovia Rzeszów	07.11.2013	(France) Stephane Antiga
6.	Jastrzębski Węgiel	23.11.2013	(Argentina) Nicolas Uriarte
7.	Lotos Trefl Gdańsk	27.11.2013	(Poland) Mariusz Wlazły
8.	Transfer Bydgoszcz	30.11.2013	(Argentina) Nicolas Uriarte
9.	BBTS Bielsko-Biała	07.12.2013	(France) Stephane Antiga
10.	AZS Politechnika Warszawska	14.12.2013	(Argentina) Facundo Conte
11.	AZS Częstochowa	19.12.2013	(Poland) Karol Kłos
12.	Indykpol AZS Olsztyn	08.01.2014	(Serbia) Aleksa Brđović
13.	Cerrad Czarni Radom	11.01.2014	(Poland) Mariusz Wlazły
14.	ZAKSA Kędzierzyn-Koźle	26.01.2014	(Poland) Karol Kłos
15.	Transfer Bydgoszcz	01.02.2014	(Poland) Mariusz Wlazły
16.	BBTS Bielsko-Biała	08.02.2014	(Argentina) Nicolas Uriarte
17.	AZS Politechnika Warszawska	16.02.2014	(Poland) Mariusz Wlazły
18.	AZS Częstochowa	19.02.2014	(Poland) Mariusz Wlazły
19.	AZS Politechnika Warszawska	08.03.2014	(Argentina) Facundo Conte
20.	AZS Politechnika Warszawska	09.03.2014	(Poland) Mariusz Wlazły
21.	AZS Politechnika Warszawska	24.03.2014	(Argentina) Nicolas Uriarte
22.	Jastrzębski Węgiel	06.04.2014	(Argentina) Facundo Conte
23.	Jastrzębski Węgiel	07.04.2014	(Argentina) Nicolas Uriarte
24.	Jastrzębski Węgiel	13.04.2014	(Argentina) Nicolas Uriarte
25.	Asseco Resovia Rzeszów	22.04.2014	(Poland) Mariusz Wlazły
26.	Asseco Resovia Rzeszów	23.04.2014	(Poland) Mariusz Wlazły
27.	Asseco Resovia Rzeszów	27.04.2014	(Poland) Mariusz Wlazły

=== General classification ===
No.	Player	MVP
1.	(Poland) Mariusz Wlazły	10
2.	(Argentina) Nicolas Uriarte	6
3.	(France) Stephane Antiga	3
	(Argentina) Facundo Conte	3
5.	(Poland) Karol Kłos	2
6.	(Poland) Paweł Zatorski	1
	(Netherlands) Wytze Kooistra	1
	(Serbia) Aleksa Brđović	1

== Results, schedules and standings ==
=== 2013–14 PlusLiga ===
==== Regular season ====
October 12, 2013; 15:00	PGE Skra Bełchatów	3–1	Lotos Trefl Gdańsk	Energia Hall, Bełchatów; Attendance: 2,800; Referees: NIEMCZURA Waldemar - KRÓL Piotr
October 12, 2013; 15:00	(23–25, 25–15, 25–21, 25–20) MVP: Paweł Zatorski			Energia Hall, Bełchatów; Attendance: 2,800; Referees: NIEMCZURA Waldemar - KRÓL Piotr

October 20, 2013; 17:00	Effector Kielce	1–3	PGE Skra Bełchatów	Legionów Hall, Kielce; Attendance: 3,000; Referees: DUDEK Piotr - HOJKA Jacek
October 20, 2013; 17:00	(18–25, 20–25, 25–14, 16–25) MVP: Stephane Antiga			Legionów Hall, Kielce; Attendance: 3,000; Referees: DUDEK Piotr - HOJKA Jacek

October 27, 2013; 14:45	PGE Skra Bełchatów	3–1	Indykpol AZS Olsztyn	Energia Hall, Bełchatów; Attendance: 2,700; Referees: JANIK Tomasz - HERBIK Marcin
October 27, 2013; 14:45	(25–22, 26–24, 21–25, 25–20) MVP: Mariusz Wlazły			Energia Hall, Bełchatów; Attendance: 2,700; Referees: JANIK Tomasz - HERBIK Marcin

November 2, 2013; 17:00	Cerrad Czarni Radom	3–1	PGE Skra Bełchatów	Hala MOSiR, Radom; Attendance: 1,300; Referees: HOJKA Jacek - JASIŃSKI Dariusz
November 2, 2013; 17:00	(29–27, 21–25, 25–22, 25–22) MVP: Wytze Kooistra			Hala MOSiR, Radom; Attendance: 1,300; Referees: HOJKA Jacek - JASIŃSKI Dariusz

November 9, 2013; 14:45	PGE Skra Bełchatów	3–2	Asseco Resovia Rzeszów	Energia Hall, Bełchatów; Attendance: 2,700; Referees: JASIŃSKI Dariusz - LAGIERSKI Mariusz
November 9, 2013; 14:45	(21–25, 25–22, 25–18, 21–25, 15–12) MVP: Stephane Antiga			Energia Hall, Bełchatów; Attendance: 2,700; Referees: JASIŃSKI Dariusz - LAGIERSKI Mariusz

November 16, 2013; 14:45	ZAKSA Kędzierzyn-Koźle	3–1	PGE Skra Bełchatów	Azoty Hall, Kędzierzyn-Koźle; Attendance: 3,200; Referees: HERBIK Marcin - JANIK Tomasz
November 16, 2013; 14:45	(22–25, 25–20, 25–19, 25–21) MVP: Grzegorz Bociek			Azoty Hall, Kędzierzyn-Koźle; Attendance: 3,200; Referees: HERBIK Marcin - JANIK Tomasz

November 23, 2013; 14:45	PGE Skra Bełchatów	3–1	Jastrzębski Węgiel	Energia Hall, Bełchatów; Attendance: 2,700; Referees: BURKIEWICZ Paweł - DUDEK Piotr
November 23, 2013; 14:45	(18–25, 27–25, 25–23, 25–21) MVP: Nicolas Uriarte			Energia Hall, Bełchatów; Attendance: 2,700; Referees: BURKIEWICZ Paweł - DUDEK Piotr

November 27, 2013; 19:00	Lotos Trefl Gdańsk	0–3	PGE Skra Bełchatów	Ergo Arena, Gdańsk; Attendance: 3,810; Referees: JANIK Tomasz - MACIEJEWSKI Maciej
November 27, 2013; 19:00	(21–25, 8–25, 16–25) MVP: Mariusz Wlazły			Ergo Arena, Gdańsk; Attendance: 3,810; Referees: JANIK Tomasz - MACIEJEWSKI Maciej

November 30, 2013; 14:45	Transfer Bydgoszcz	0–3	PGE Skra Bełchatów	Łuczniczka, Bydgoszcz; Attendance: 3,500; Referees: KOBIENIA Waldemar - SZMYDYŃSKI Krzysztof
November 30, 2013; 14:45	(17–25, 15–25, 20–25) MVP: Nicolas Uriarte			Łuczniczka, Bydgoszcz; Attendance: 3,500; Referees: KOBIENIA Waldemar - SZMYDYŃSKI Krzysztof

December 7, 2013; 15:00	PGE Skra Bełchatów	3–0	BBTS Bielsko-Biała	Energia Hall, Bełchatów; Attendance: 2,100; Referees: DWORAK Robert - HOJKA Jacek
December 7, 2013; 15:00	(25–14, 25–17, 25–11) MVP: Stephane Antiga			Energia Hall, Bełchatów; Attendance: 2,100; Referees: DWORAK Robert - HOJKA Jacek

December 14, 2013; 15:00	PGE Skra Bełchatów	3–0	AZS Politechnika Warszawska	Energia Hall, Bełchatów; Attendance: 2,500; Referees: KRÓL Piotr - NIEMCZURA Waldemar
December 14, 2013; 15:00	(25–15, 30–28, 25–21) MVP: Facundo Conte			Energia Hall, Bełchatów; Attendance: 2,500; Referees: KRÓL Piotr - NIEMCZURA Waldemar

December 19, 2013; 18:00	AZS Częstochowa	0–3	PGE Skra Bełchatów	Hala Sportowa Częstochowa, Częstochowa; Attendance: 3,200; Referees: Mariusz Gadzina, Anna Niedbał
December 19, 2013; 18:00	(19–25, 21–25, 18–25) MVP: Karol Kłos			Hala Sportowa Częstochowa, Częstochowa; Attendance: 3,200; Referees: Mariusz Gadzina, Anna Niedbał

January 8, 2014; 20:30	Indykpol AZS Olsztyn	0–3	PGE Skra Bełchatów	Urania Hall, Olsztyn; Attendance: 2,000; Referees: MAROSZEK Wojciech - KRÓL Piotr
January 8, 2014; 20:30	(21–25, 18–25, 22–25) MVP: Aleksa Brđović			Urania Hall, Olsztyn; Attendance: 2,000; Referees: MAROSZEK Wojciech - KRÓL Piotr

January 11, 2014; 14:45	PGE Skra Bełchatów	3–0	Cerrad Czarni Radom	Energia Hall, Bełchatów; Attendance: 2,500; Referees: LAGIERSKI Marek - KUCHNA Andrzej
January 11, 2014; 14:45	(25–23, 25–17, 25–21) MVP: Mariusz Wlazły			Energia Hall, Bełchatów; Attendance: 2,500; Referees: LAGIERSKI Marek - KUCHNA Andrzej

January 18, 2014; 14:45	Asseco Resovia Rzeszów	3–0	PGE Skra Bełchatów	Podpromie Hall, Rzeszów; Attendance: 4,300; Referees: MAROSZEK Wojciech - LAGIERSKI Marek
January 18, 2014; 14:45	(25–20, 25–15, 25–23) MVP: Jochen Schops			Podpromie Hall, Rzeszów; Attendance: 4,300; Referees: MAROSZEK Wojciech - LAGIERSKI Marek

January 26, 2014; 14:45	PGE Skra Bełchatów	3–0	ZAKSA Kędzierzyn-Koźle	Energia Hall, Bełchatów; Attendance: 2,700; Referees: JASIŃSKI Dariusz - SKOWROŃSKI Piotr
January 26, 2014; 14:45	(25–22, 25–14, 25–11) MVP: Karol Kłos			Energia Hall, Bełchatów; Attendance: 2,700; Referees: JASIŃSKI Dariusz - SKOWROŃSKI Piotr

January 29, 2014; 17:30	Jastrzębski Węgiel	3–2	PGE Skra Bełchatów	Hala Sportowa, Jastrzębie-Zdrój; Attendance: 3,000; Referees: SZMYDYŃSKI Krzysztof - MACIEJEWSKI Maciej
January 29, 2014; 17:30	(25–21, 25–22, 19–25, 20–25, 15–13) MVP: Michał Kubiak			Hala Sportowa, Jastrzębie-Zdrój; Attendance: 3,000; Referees: SZMYDYŃSKI Krzysztof - MACIEJEWSKI Maciej

February 1, 2014; 15:00	PGE Skra Bełchatów	3–0	Transfer Bydgoszcz	Energia Hall, Bełchatów; Attendance: 2,500; Referees: KUCHNA Andrzej - NIEMCZURA Waldemar
February 1, 2014; 15:00	(25–23, 25–19, 25–18) MVP: Mariusz Wlazły			Energia Hall, Bełchatów; Attendance: 2,500; Referees: KUCHNA Andrzej - NIEMCZURA Waldemar

February 8, 2014; 15:00	BBTS Bielsko-Biała	0–3	PGE Skra Bełchatów	Hala Pod Dębowcem, Bielsko-Biała; Attendance: 3,000; Referees: NIEDBAŁ Anna - BURKIEWICZ Paweł
February 8, 2014; 15:00	(16–25, 18–25, 21–25) MVP: Nicolas Uriarte			Hala Pod Dębowcem, Bielsko-Biała; Attendance: 3,000; Referees: NIEDBAŁ Anna - BURKIEWICZ Paweł

February 16, 2014; 14:45	AZS Politechnika Warszawska	0–3	PGE Skra Bełchatów	Torwar Hall, Warsaw; Attendance: 4,200; Referees: SZMYDYŃSKI Krzysztof - SKOWROŃSKI Piotr
February 16, 2014; 14:45	(18–25, 17–25, 16–25) MVP: Mariusz Wlazły			Torwar Hall, Warsaw; Attendance: 4,200; Referees: SZMYDYŃSKI Krzysztof - SKOWROŃSKI Piotr

February 19, 2014; 18:00	PGE Skra Bełchatów	3–1	AZS Częstochowa	Energia Hall, Bełchatów; Attendance: 2,000; Referees: JANIK Tomasz - HERBIK Marcin
February 19, 2014; 18:00	(25–15, 25–20, 24–26, 25–17) MVP: Mariusz Wlazły			Energia Hall, Bełchatów; Attendance: 2,000; Referees: JANIK Tomasz - HERBIK Marcin

March 5, 2014; 18:00	PGE Skra Bełchatów	2–3	Effector Kielce	Energia Hall, Bełchatów; Attendance: 1,500; Referees: Piotr Król, Marek Lagierski
March 5, 2014; 18:00	(25–21, 22–25, 32–30, 22–25, 14–16) MVP: Bartosz Kaczmarek			Energia Hall, Bełchatów; Attendance: 1,500; Referees: Piotr Król, Marek Lagierski

==== Quarterfinal ====
March 8, 2014; 15:00	PGE Skra Bełchatów	3–1	AZS Politechnika Warszawska	Energia Hall, Bełchatów; Attendance: 1,200; Referees: NIEDBAŁ Anna - GADZINA Mariusz
March 8, 2014; 15:00	(25–17, 20–25, 25–20, 25–20) MVP: Facundo Conte			Energia Hall, Bełchatów; Attendance: 1,200; Referees: NIEDBAŁ Anna - GADZINA Mariusz

March 9, 2014; 15:00	PGE Skra Bełchatów	3–0	AZS Politechnika Warszawska	Energia Hall, Bełchatów; Attendance: 1,000; Referees: BROŃSKI Jacek - SZMYDYŃSKI Krzysztof
March 9, 2014; 15:00	(26–24, 25–16, 25–15) MVP: Mariusz Wlazły			Energia Hall, Bełchatów; Attendance: 1,000; Referees: BROŃSKI Jacek - SZMYDYŃSKI Krzysztof

March 24, 2014; 19:00	AZS Politechnika Warszawska	1–3	PGE Skra Bełchatów	Torwar Hall, Warsaw; Attendance: 3,200; Referees: LAGIERSKI Marek - NIEMCZURA Waldemar
March 24, 2014; 19:00	(23–25, 19–25, 25–21, 21–25) MVP: Nicolas Uriarte			Torwar Hall, Warsaw; Attendance: 3,200; Referees: LAGIERSKI Marek - NIEMCZURA Waldemar

==== Semifinal ====
April 6, 2014; 13:30	PGE Skra Bełchatów	3–2	Jastrzębski Węgiel	Energia Hall, Bełchatów; Attendance: 2,700; Referees: SZMYDYŃSKI Krzysztof - MACIEJEWSKI Maciej
April 6, 2014; 13:30	(25–23, 17–25, 23–25, 25–17, 15–11) MVP: Facundo Conte			Energia Hall, Bełchatów; Attendance: 2,700; Referees: SZMYDYŃSKI Krzysztof - MACIEJEWSKI Maciej

April 7, 2014; 18:00	PGE Skra Bełchatów	3–0	Jastrzębski Węgiel	Energia Hall, Bełchatów; Attendance: 2,700; Referees: SKOWROŃSKI Piotr - JASIŃSKI Dariusz
April 7, 2014; 18:00	(25–23, 25–20, 25–15) MVP: Nicolas Uriarte			Energia Hall, Bełchatów; Attendance: 2,700; Referees: SKOWROŃSKI Piotr - JASIŃSKI Dariusz

April 13, 2014; 14:45	Jastrzębski Węgiel	0–3	PGE Skra Bełchatów	Hala Sportowa, Jastrzębie-Zdrój; Attendance: 3,000; Referees: BURKIEWICZ Paweł - DUDEK Piotr
April 13, 2014; 14:45	(23–25, 18–25, 17–25) MVP: Nicolas Uriarte			Hala Sportowa, Jastrzębie-Zdrój; Attendance: 3,000; Referees: BURKIEWICZ Paweł - DUDEK Piotr

==== Final ====
On April 27, 2014, took the third game. PGE Skra fought to win the title, and Asseco Resovia wanted to keep their chances of struggle and will equalize result. Hosts through effective game the whole team, and especially of captain Mariusz Wlazły, who was the Most Valuable Player in all three matches, won the third final match in three sets. PGE Skra won their 8th title of Polish Champion after two seasons break.

April 22, 2014; 18:00	Asseco Resovia Rzeszów	2–3	PGE Skra Bełchatów	Podpromie Hall, Rzeszów; Attendance: 4,500; Referees: LAGIERSKI Marek - KUCHNA Andrzej
April 22, 2014; 18:00	(31–29, 20–25, 20–25, 25–22, 12–15) MVP: Mariusz Wlazły			Podpromie Hall, Rzeszów; Attendance: 4,500; Referees: LAGIERSKI Marek - KUCHNA Andrzej

April 23, 2014; 20:00	Asseco Resovia Rzeszów	0–3	PGE Skra Bełchatów	Podpromie Hall, Rzeszów; Attendance: 4,500; Referees: BURKIEWICZ Paweł - TWARDOWSKI Maciej
April 23, 2014; 20:00	(24–26, 17–25, 15–25) MVP: Mariusz Wlazły			Podpromie Hall, Rzeszów; Attendance: 4,500; Referees: BURKIEWICZ Paweł - TWARDOWSKI Maciej

April 27, 2014; 14:45	PGE Skra Bełchatów	3–0	Asseco Resovia Rzeszów	Energia Hall, Bełchatów; Attendance: 2,700; Referees: SZMYDYŃSKI Krzysztof - MACIEJEWSKI Maciej
April 27, 2014; 14:45	(25–17, 25–20, 25–18) MVP: Mariusz Wlazły			Energia Hall, Bełchatów; Attendance: 2,700; Referees: SZMYDYŃSKI Krzysztof - MACIEJEWSKI Maciej

=== Polish Cup 2014 ===
==== Quarterfinal ====
March 13, 2014	PGE Skra Bełchatów	3–0	Effector Kielce	Energia Hall, Bełchatów
March 13, 2014	(25–21, 25–19, 25–14)			Energia Hall, Bełchatów

==== Semifinal ====
March 15, 2014	PGE Skra Bełchatów	2–3	ZAKSA Kędzierzyn-Koźle	CRS Hall Zielona Góra, Zielona Góra
March 15, 2014	(25–23, 21–25, 28–26, 23–25, 8–15)			CRS Hall Zielona Góra, Zielona Góra

=== 2013–14 CEV Cup ===
==== 16th Finals ====
October 24, 2013; 18:00	PGE Skra Bełchatów (Poland)	3–1	(Greece) Ethnikos Alexandroupoli F.C.	Energia Hall, Bełchatów; Attendance: 2,750; Referees: KHUC Thien - NIKOLIC Milan
October 24, 2013; 18:00	(23–25, 25–18, 25–18, 25–17)			Energia Hall, Bełchatów; Attendance: 2,750; Referees: KHUC Thien - NIKOLIC Milan

October 30, 2013; 20:00	Ethnikos Alexandroupoli F.C. (Greece)	0–3	(Poland) PGE Skra Bełchatów	Fotis Kosmas Stadium, Alexandroupoli; Attendance: 1,060; Referees: CVETKOVIC Vladimir - PROZOROV Veaceslav
October 30, 2013; 20:00	(21–25, 15–25, 23–25)			Fotis Kosmas Stadium, Alexandroupoli; Attendance: 1,060; Referees: CVETKOVIC Vladimir - PROZOROV Veaceslav

==== 8th Finals ====
December 5, 2013; 20:00	PGE Skra Bełchatów (Poland)	3–0	(Switzerland) Volley Amriswil	Energia Hall, Bełchatów; Attendance: 2,500; Referees: STOYANOV Kiril - MILINOVIC Miroslav
December 5, 2013; 20:00	(25–23, 25–14, 25–21)			Energia Hall, Bełchatów; Attendance: 2,500; Referees: STOYANOV Kiril - MILINOVIC Miroslav

December 10, 2013; 19:30	Volley Amriswil (Switzerland)	0–3	(Poland) PGE Skra Bełchatów	Athletikzentrum, St. Gallen; Attendance: 850; Referees: REICHARDT Gerrit Jan - VISAN Benone
December 10, 2013; 19:30	(13–25, 16–25, 18–25)			Athletikzentrum, St. Gallen; Attendance: 850; Referees: REICHARDT Gerrit Jan - VISAN Benone

==== 4th Finals ====
January 16, 2014; 20:00	Generali Haching (Germany)	0–3	(Poland) PGE Skra Bełchatów	Energia Hall, Bełchatów; Attendance: 927; Referees: SCHIMPL Igor - STANISIC Sascha
January 16, 2014; 20:00	(27–29, 29–31, 17–25)			Energia Hall, Bełchatów; Attendance: 927; Referees: SCHIMPL Igor - STANISIC Sascha

January 23, 2014; 18:00	PGE Skra Bełchatów (Poland)	3–2	(Germany) Generali Haching	GENERALI Sportarena, Unterhaching; Attendance: 2,500; Referees: KOVAR Vlastimil - GUILLET Olivier
January 23, 2014; 18:00	(25–21, 25–19, 22–25, 22–25, 28–26)			GENERALI Sportarena, Unterhaching; Attendance: 2,500; Referees: KOVAR Vlastimil - GUILLET Olivier

==== Challenge phase ====
February 5, 2014; 20:00	VfB Friedrichshafen (Germany)	2–3	(Poland) PGE Skra Bełchatów	ZF-Arena Friedrichshafen, Friedrichshafen; Attendance: 1,400; Referees: KOLOS Adnan - FERREIRA Lidio
February 5, 2014; 20:00	(25–17, 21–25, 25–17, 18–25, 10–15)			ZF-Arena Friedrichshafen, Friedrichshafen; Attendance: 1,400; Referees: KOLOS Adnan - FERREIRA Lidio

February 13, 2014; 18:00	PGE Skra Bełchatów (Poland)	3–1	(Germany) VfB Friedrichshafen	Energia Hall, Bełchatów; Attendance: 2,500; Referees: VALENTAR Bernard - CHAPRAZOV Nikolay
February 13, 2014; 18:00	(26–24, 24–26, 25–17, 25–23)			Energia Hall, Bełchatów; Attendance: 2,500; Referees: VALENTAR Bernard - CHAPRAZOV Nikolay

==== Semifinals ====
February 26, 2014; 19:45	Gubernija Nizhny Novgorod (Russia)	3–2	(Poland) PGE Skra Bełchatów	DS Zarechye, Nizhny Novgorod; Attendance: 1,500; Referees: KOLAREVIC Boris - KRTICKA Jan
February 26, 2014; 19:45	(25–19, 25–21, 22–25, 22–25, 15–13)			DS Zarechye, Nizhny Novgorod; Attendance: 1,500; Referees: KOLAREVIC Boris - KRTICKA Jan

March 2, 2014; 20:00	PGE Skra Bełchatów (Poland)	2–3	(Russia) Gubernija Nizhny Novgorod	Energia Hall, Bełchatów; Attendance: 2,700; Referees: GNANI Giorgio - DI GIACOMO Arturo
March 2, 2014; 20:00	(21–25, 25–19, 25–23, 18–25, 16–14)			Energia Hall, Bełchatów; Attendance: 2,700; Referees: GNANI Giorgio - DI GIACOMO Arturo

== End of season ==
On May 2, 2014, held the official end of the season for the club from Bełchatów. During the ceremony Konrad Piechocki summarized the season and officially said goodbye to wing-spiker Stephane Antiga, who after leaving the club became the coach of the Poland national team. Four months later, Antiga led Poland to title of the 2014 World Champions.
