= 2014–15 PGE Skra Bełchatów season =

PGE Skra Bełchatów
2014–15 season
- Chairman: Konrad Piechocki
- Manager: Miguel Falasca

PGE Skra Bełchatów 2014–2015 season is the 2014/2015 volleyball season for Polish professional volleyball club PGE Skra Bełchatów.

The club will compete in:

- Polish Championship
- Polish Cup
- CEV Champions League
- ENEA Polish SuperCup

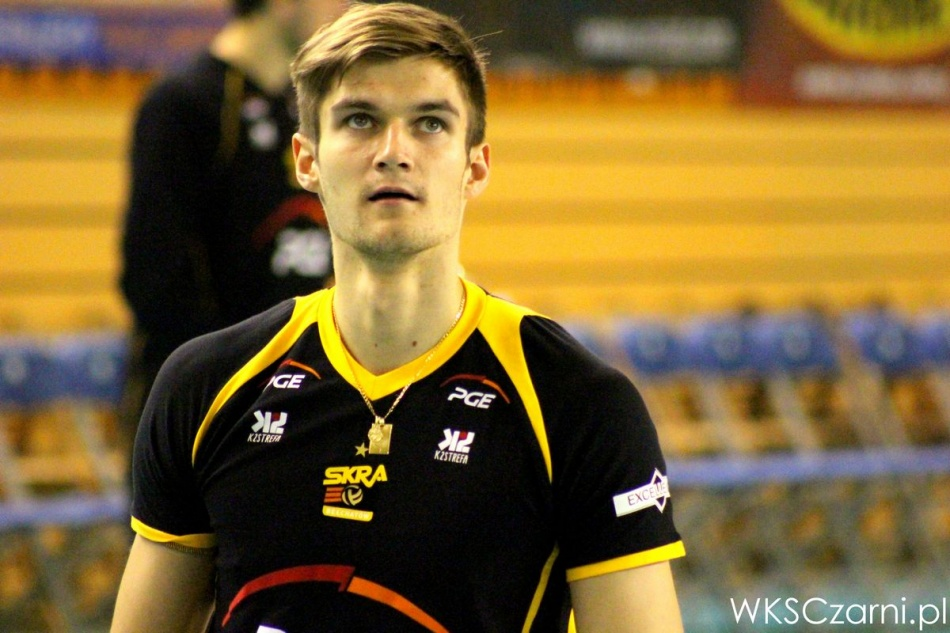
Middle blocker Karol Kłos before the match PGE Skra Bełchatów - Cerrad Czarni Radom on October 29, 2014.

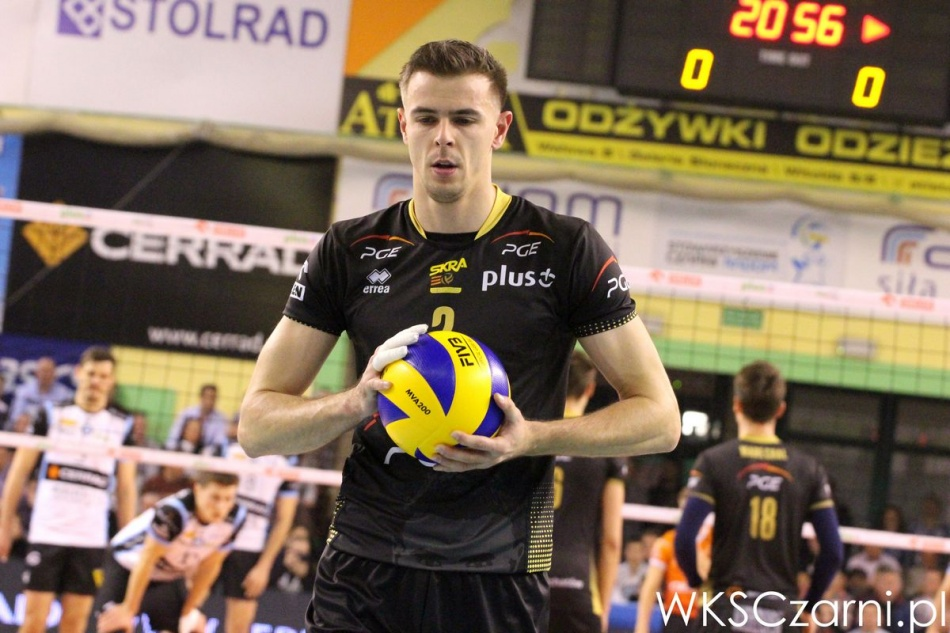
The captain Mariusz Wlazły during the match with Cerrad Czarni Radom on October 29, 2014.

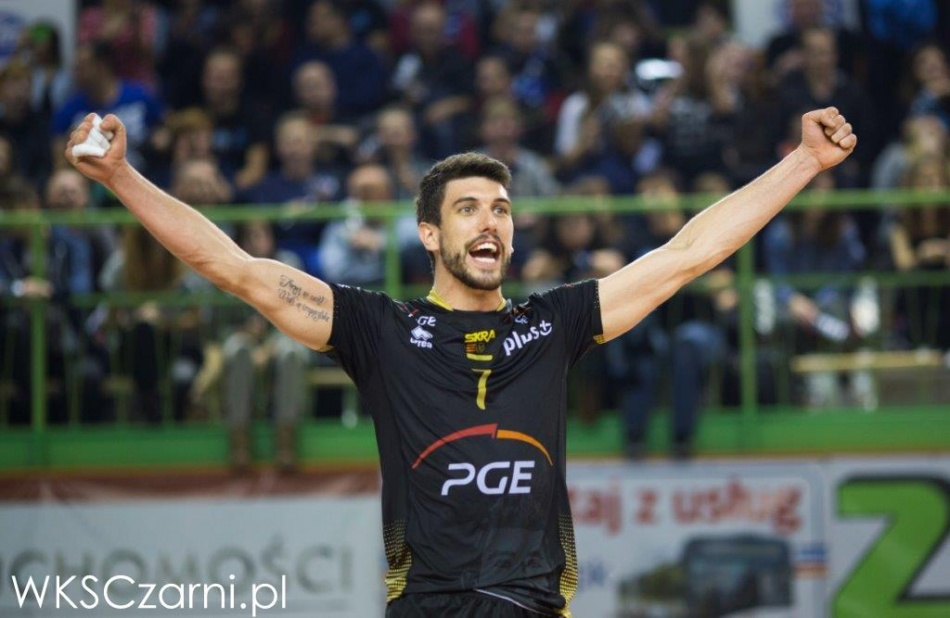
Argentine outside hitter - Facundo Conte on October 29, 2014 (match with Cerrad Czarni Radom).

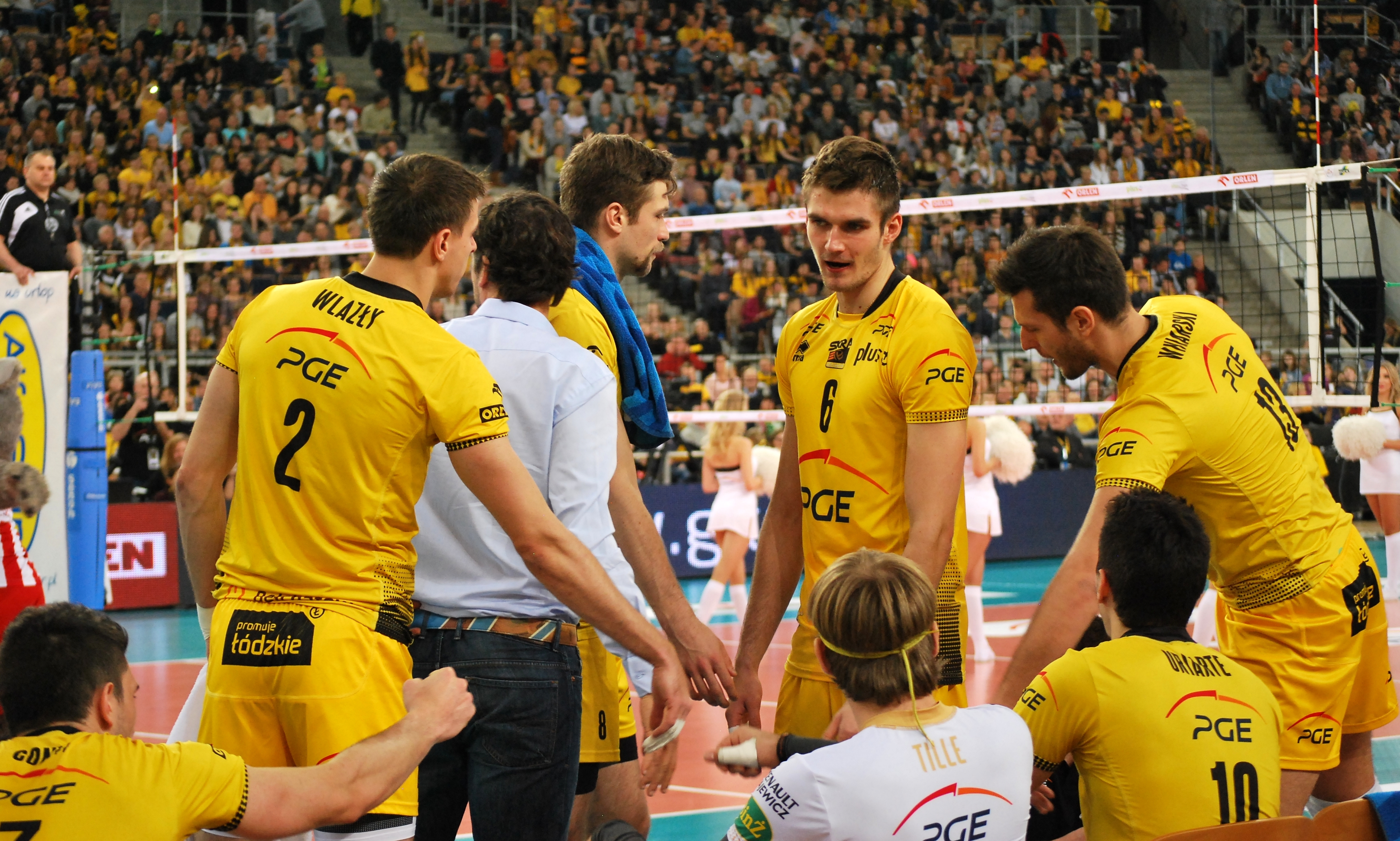
First six during match of PlusLiga with Asseco Resovia Rzeszów at Atlas Arena, Łódź on November 30, 2014.

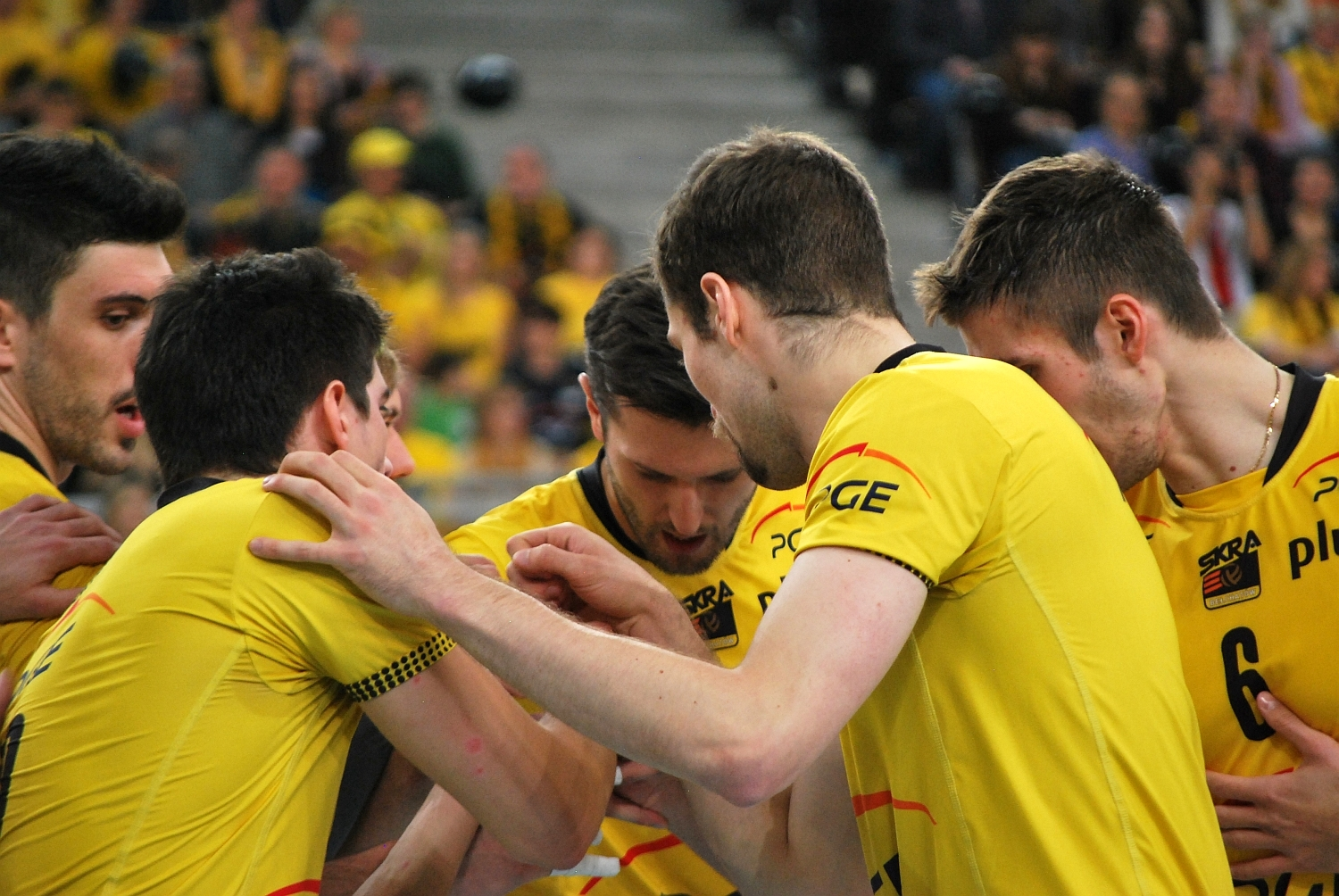
Meeting with Asseco Resovia Rzeszów at Atlas Arena, Łódź on November 30, 2014.

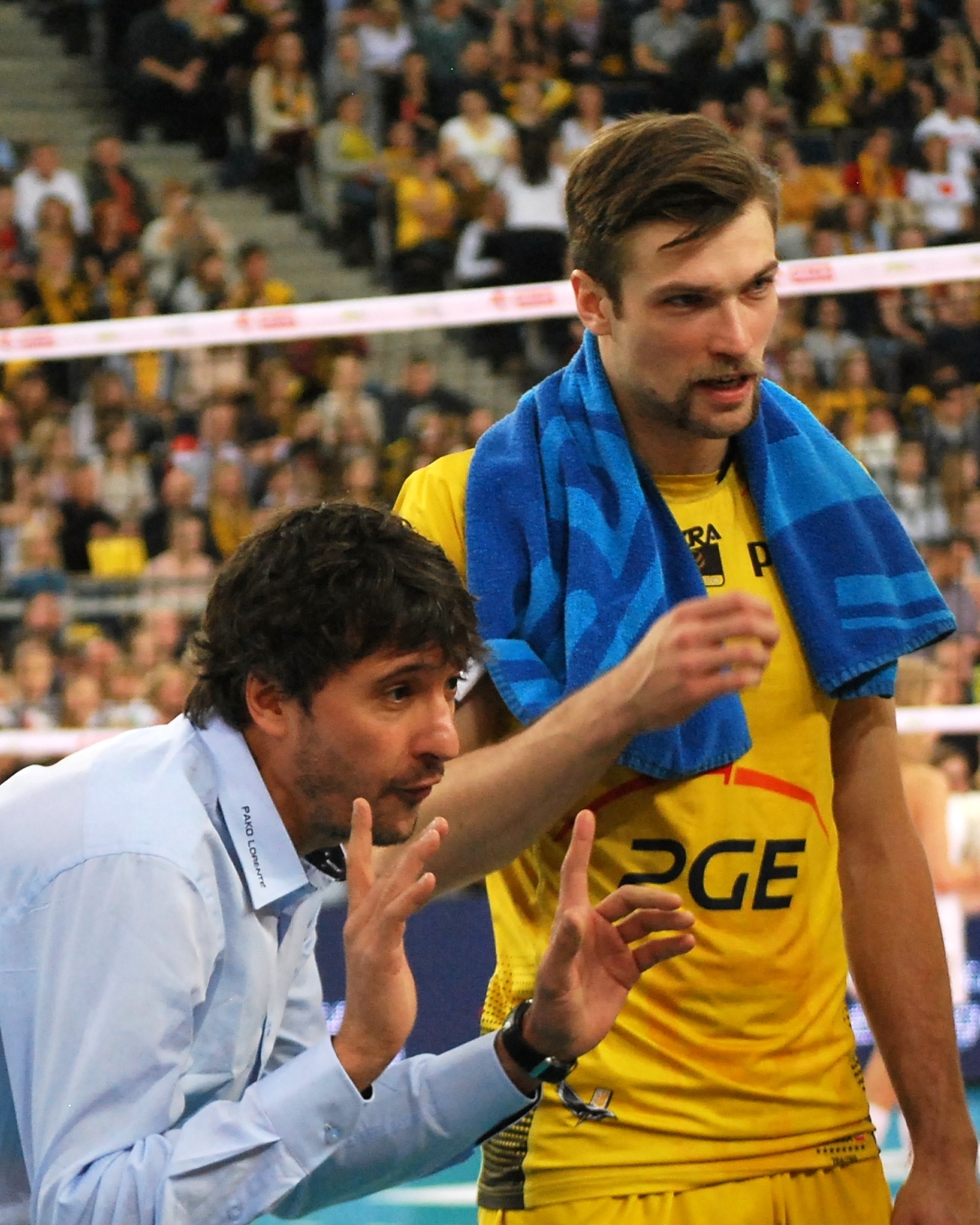
Head coach Miguel Angel Falasca and middle blocker Andrzej Wrona during a break on November 30, 2014.

== Team roster ==
Head coach:	Miguel Angel Falasca
Assistant:	Fabio Storti
Coach of physical preparation:	Daniel Lecouna
Doctor:	Wojciech Łucarz
Physiotherapists:	Michał Woźniak, Tomasz Kuciapiński
Scoutman:	Francesco Oleni
Manager:	Sebastian Gaszek

No.	Name	Date of birth	Position
1	(Serbia) Srećko Lisinac	May 17, 1992	middle blocker
2	(Poland) Mariusz Wlazły (C)	August 4, 1983	opposite
6	(Poland) Karol Kłos	August 8, 1989	middle blocker
7	(Argentina) Facundo Conte	August 25, 1989	outside hitter
8	(Poland) Andrzej Wrona	December 27, 1988	middle blocker
9	(Poland) Maciej Muzaj	May 21, 1994	opposite
10	(Argentina) Nicolás Uriarte	March 21, 1990	setter
11	(Poland) Piotr Badura	February 20, 1995	middle blocker
12	(Poland) Wojciech Włodarczyk	October 28, 1990	outside hitter
13	(Poland) Michał Winiarski	September 28, 1983	outside hitter
15	(Serbia) Aleksa Brđović	July 29, 1993	setter
16	(Poland) Kacper Piechocki	February 17, 1995	libero
17	(Germany) Ferdinand Tille	December 8, 1988	libero
18	(France) (Poland) Nicolas Marechal	March 4, 1987	outside hitter

== Squad changes for the 2014–2015 season ==
In:

No.	Player	Position	From
1	(Serbia) Srećko Lisinac	middle blocker	Berlin Recycling Volleys
11	(Poland) Piotr Badura	middle blocker	SMS PZPS Spała
13	(Poland) Michał Winiarski	outside hitter	Fakel Novy Urengoy
16	(Poland) Kacper Piechocki	libero	AZS Częstochowa
17	(Germany) Ferdinand Tille	libero	Generali Unterhaching
18	(France) (Poland) Nicolas Marechal	outside hitter	Jastrzębski Węgiel

Out:

No.	Player	Position	To
4	(Poland) Daniel Pliński	middle blocker	Cerrad Czarni Radom
5	(France) Samuel Tuia	outside hitter	Galatasaray FXTCR
11	(France) Stéphane Antiga	outside hitter	retirement; head coach of Poland
16	(Poland) Jędrzej Maćkowiak	middle blocker	Effector Kielce
18	(Poland) Paweł Zatorski	libero	ZAKSA Kędzierzyn-Koźle

== Most Valuable Players ==
=== PlusLiga ===
No.	Opponent	Date	Player
1.	MKS Banimex Będzin	04.10.2014	(Argentina) Facundo Conte
2.	MKS Cuprum Lubin	10.10.2014	(Argentina) Nicolás Uriarte
3.	Jastrzębski Węgiel	15.10.2014	(France) Nicolas Marechal
4.	ZAKSA Kędzierzyn-Koźle	19.10.2014	(Poland) Mariusz Wlazły
5.	Indykpol AZS Olsztyn	22.10.2014	(Poland) Kacper Piechocki
6.	AZS Politechnika Warszawska	25.10.2014	(Argentina) Nicolás Uriarte
7.	Cerrad Czarni Radom	29.10.2014	(Poland) Karol Kłos
8.	Effector Kielce	08.11.2014	(Serbia) Srećko Lisinac
9.	Transfer Bydgoszcz	12.11.2014	(Serbia) Srećko Lisinac
10.	Lotos Trefl Gdańsk	16.11.2014	(Poland) Mariusz Wlazły
11.	AZS Częstochowa	22.11.2014	(Poland) Maciej Muzaj
12.	BBTS Bielsko-Biała	26.11.2014	(Argentina) Facundo Conte
13.	Asseco Resovia Rzeszów	30.11.2014	(Argentina) Nicolas Uriarte
14.	MKS Cuprum Lubin	13.12.2014	(Argentina) Facundo Conte
15.	Indykpol AZS Olsztyn	03.01.2015	(Poland) Kacper Piechocki
16.	AZS Politechnika Warszawska	11.01.2015	(Poland) Michał Winiarski
17.	Cerrad Czarni Radom	17.01.2015	(Poland) Mariusz Wlazły
18.	Effector Kielce	24.01.2015	(Argentina) Nicolás Uriarte
19.	Transfer Bydgoszcz	31.01.2015	(Poland) Karol Kłos
20.	Lotos Trefl Gdańsk	04.02.2015	(Argentina) Nicolás Uriarte
21.	AZS Częstochowa	07.02.2015	(Poland) Mariusz Wlazły
22.	BBTS Bielsko-Biała	14.02.2015	(Argentina) Facundo Conte
23.	ZAKSA Kędzierzyn-Koźle	25.02.2015	(Argentina) Nicolás Uriarte
24.	ZAKSA Kędzierzyn-Koźle	28.02.2015	(Poland) Mariusz Wlazły
25.	Lotos Trefl Gdańsk	14.03.2015	(Poland) Mariusz Wlazły
26.	Jastrzębski Węgiel	15.04.2015	(Serbia) Aleksa Brđović
27.	Jastrzębski Węgiel	25.04.2015	(Argentina) Facundo Conte
28.	Jastrzębski Węgiel	06.05.2015	(France) Nicolas Marechal

==== General classification ====
No.	Player	MVP
1.	(Argentina) Nicolás Uriarte	6
	(Poland) Mariusz Wlazły	6
3.	(Argentina) Facundo Conte	5
4.	(Serbia) Srećko Lisinac	2
	(Poland) Kacper Piechocki	2
	(Poland) Karol Kłos	2
	(France) Nicolas Marechal	2
8.	(Poland) Maciej Muzaj	1
	(Poland) Michał Winiarski	1
	(Serbia) Aleksa Brđović	1

== Results, schedules and standings ==
=== 2014 ENEA Polish SuperCup ===
On October 8, 2014 PGE Skra as the Polish Champion 2014 played with ZAKSA Kędzierzyn-Koźle (winner of Polish Cup2014) for the ENEA Polish SuperCup2014. PGE Skra won 3-1 at Arena Poznań in Poznań. Facundo Conte was awarded a title of the Most Valuable Player.

October 8, 2014; 20:00	ZAKSA Kędzierzyn-Koźle	1–3	PGE Skra Bełchatów	Arena Poznań, Poznań; Referees: MAROSZEK Wojciech - LAGIERSKI Marek
October 8, 2014; 20:00	(24–26, 22–25, 25–20, 25–27)			Arena Poznań, Poznań; Referees: MAROSZEK Wojciech - LAGIERSKI Marek

=== 2014–15 PlusLiga ===
==== Regular season ====
October 4, 2014; 14:45	MKS Banimex Będzin	1–3	PGE Skra Bełchatów	Hala Widowiskowo-Sportowa MOSiR, Sosnowiec; Referees: DUDEK Piotr - GADZINA Mariusz
October 4, 2014; 14:45	(21–25, 25–23, 13–25, 18–25) MVP: Facundo Conte			Hala Widowiskowo-Sportowa MOSiR, Sosnowiec; Referees: DUDEK Piotr - GADZINA Mariusz

October 10, 2014; 18:00	MKS Cuprum Lubin	0–3	PGE Skra Bełchatów	HWS RCS, Lubin; Referees: TWARDOWSKI Maciej - WOLSKI Zbigniew
October 10, 2014; 18:00	(15–25, 20–25, 22–25) MVP: Nicolás Uriarte			HWS RCS, Lubin; Referees: TWARDOWSKI Maciej - WOLSKI Zbigniew

October 15, 2014; 18:00	Jastrzębski Węgiel	0–3	PGE Skra Bełchatów	Hala Widowiskowo-Sportowa, Jastrzębie-Zdrój; Attendance: 3,007; Referees: DUDEK Piotr - TWARDOWSKI Maciej
October 15, 2014; 18:00	(22–25, 21–25, 22–25) MVP: Nicolas Marechal			Hala Widowiskowo-Sportowa, Jastrzębie-Zdrój; Attendance: 3,007; Referees: DUDEK Piotr - TWARDOWSKI Maciej

October 19, 2014; 14:45	PGE Skra Bełchatów	3–0	ZAKSA Kędzierzyn-Koźle	Energia Hall, Bełchatów; Referees: BURKIEWICZ Paweł - DUDEK Piotr
October 19, 2014; 14:45	(25–12, 25–21, 25–21) MVP: Mariusz Wlazły			Energia Hall, Bełchatów; Referees: BURKIEWICZ Paweł - DUDEK Piotr

October 22, 2014; 18:00	Indykpol AZS Olsztyn	0–3	PGE Skra Bełchatów	Urania Hall, Olsztyn; Referees: MAROSZEK Wojciech - BUDZIK Marek
October 22, 2014; 18:00	(18–25, 14–25, 15–25) MVP: Kacper Piechocki			Urania Hall, Olsztyn; Referees: MAROSZEK Wojciech - BUDZIK Marek

October 25, 2014; 15:00	PGE Skra Bełchatów	3–0	AZS Politechnika Warszawska	Energia Hall, Bełchatów; Referees: KUCHNA Andrzej - BUDZIK Marek
October 25, 2014; 15:00	(25–17, 26–24, 25–16) MVP: Nicolás Uriarte			Energia Hall, Bełchatów; Referees: KUCHNA Andrzej - BUDZIK Marek

October 29, 2014; 20:30	Cerrad Czarni Radom	2–3	PGE Skra Bełchatów	Hala Widowiskowo-Sportowa MOSiR, Radom; Referees: BURKIEWICZ Paweł - DUDEK Piotr
October 29, 2014; 20:30	(17–25, 25–23, 25–22, 18–25, 9–15) MVP: Karol Kłos			Hala Widowiskowo-Sportowa MOSiR, Radom; Referees: BURKIEWICZ Paweł - DUDEK Piotr

November 8, 2014; 15:00	PGE Skra Bełchatów	3–1	Effector Kielce	Energia Hall, Bełchatów; Referees: JASIŃSKI Dariusz - HEYDUCKI Marek
November 8, 2014; 15:00	(15–25, 25–18, 25–23, 25–16) MVP: Srećko Lisinac			Energia Hall, Bełchatów; Referees: JASIŃSKI Dariusz - HEYDUCKI Marek

November 12, 2014; 20:30	Transfer Bydgoszcz	0–3	PGE Skra Bełchatów	Łuczniczka, Bydgoszcz; Referees: KRÓL Piotr - KUCHNA Andrzej
November 12, 2014; 20:30	(27–29, 23–25, 17–25) MVP: Srećko Lisinac			Łuczniczka, Bydgoszcz; Referees: KRÓL Piotr - KUCHNA Andrzej

November 16, 2014; 14:45	PGE Skra Bełchatów	3–2	Lotos Trefl Gdańsk	Energia Hall, Bełchatów; Referees: NIEDBAŁ Anna - GADZINA Mariusz
November 16, 2014; 14:45	(29–27, 25–19, 28–30, 19–25, 16–14) MVP: Mariusz Wlazły			Energia Hall, Bełchatów; Referees: NIEDBAŁ Anna - GADZINA Mariusz

November 22, 2014; 17:00	AZS Częstochowa	0–3	PGE Skra Bełchatów	Hala Sportowa Częstochowa, Częstochowa; Attendance: 3,000; Referees: FLIS Tomasz - DUDEK Piotr
November 22, 2014; 17:00	(23–25, 20–25, 20–25) MVP: Maciej Muzaj			Hala Sportowa Częstochowa, Częstochowa; Attendance: 3,000; Referees: FLIS Tomasz - DUDEK Piotr

November 26, 2014; 18:00	PGE Skra Bełchatów	3–0	BBTS Bielsko-Biała	Energia Hall, Bełchatów; Attendance: 2,200; Referees: JANIK Tomasz - TWARDOWSKI Maciej
November 26, 2014; 18:00	(25–22, 25–17, 25–15) MVP: Facundo Conte			Energia Hall, Bełchatów; Attendance: 2,200; Referees: JANIK Tomasz - TWARDOWSKI Maciej

November 30, 2014; 14:45	PGE Skra Bełchatów	3–0	Asseco Resovia Rzeszów	Atlas Arena, Łódź; Attendance: 12,500; Referees: LAGIERSKI Marek - KRÓL Piotr
November 30, 2014; 14:45	(25–19, 25–20, 25–20) MVP: Nicolás Uriarte			Atlas Arena, Łódź; Attendance: 12,500; Referees: LAGIERSKI Marek - KRÓL Piotr

December 6, 2014; 18:00	PGE Skra Bełchatów	1–3	MKS Banimex Będzin	Energia Hall, Bełchatów; Attendance: 2,000; Referees: MACIEJEWSKI Maciej - BROŃSKI Jacek
December 6, 2014; 18:00	(26–24, 18–25, 20–25, 17–25) MVP: Miłosz Hebda			Energia Hall, Bełchatów; Attendance: 2,000; Referees: MACIEJEWSKI Maciej - BROŃSKI Jacek

December 13, 2014; 15:00	PGE Skra Bełchatów	3–2	MKS Cuprum Lubin	Energia Hall, Bełchatów; Attendance: 2,400; Referees: GADZINA Mariusz - NIEDBAŁ Anna
December 13, 2014; 15:00	(19–25, 22–25, 25–19, 25–17, 15–10) MVP: Facundo Conte			Energia Hall, Bełchatów; Attendance: 2,400; Referees: GADZINA Mariusz - NIEDBAŁ Anna

December 21, 2014; 14:45	PGE Skra Bełchatów	2–3	Jastrzębski Węgiel	Energia Hall, Bełchatów; Attendance: 2,700; Referees: SZMYDYŃSKI Krzysztof - IGNATOWICZ Paweł
December 21, 2014; 14:45	(25–20, 27–29, 23–25, 25–18, 11–15) MVP: Mateusz Malinowski			Energia Hall, Bełchatów; Attendance: 2,700; Referees: SZMYDYŃSKI Krzysztof - IGNATOWICZ Paweł

December 30, 2014; 16:30	ZAKSA Kędzierzyn-Koźle	3–0	PGE Skra Bełchatów	Azoty Hall, Kędzierzyn-Koźle; Attendance: 3,200; Referees: DUDEK Piotr - TWARDOWSKI Maciej
December 30, 2014; 16:30	(25–18, 25–18, 25–17) MVP: Dick Kooy			Azoty Hall, Kędzierzyn-Koźle; Attendance: 3,200; Referees: DUDEK Piotr - TWARDOWSKI Maciej

January 3, 2015; 15:00	PGE Skra Bełchatów	3–0	Indykpol AZS Olsztyn	Energia Hall, Bełchatów; Attendance: 2,100; Referees: NIEMCZURA Waldermar - BUDZIK Marek
January 3, 2015; 15:00	(25–21, 25–14, 26–24) MVP: Kacper Piechocki			Energia Hall, Bełchatów; Attendance: 2,100; Referees: NIEMCZURA Waldermar - BUDZIK Marek

January 11, 2015; 14:45	AZS Politechnika Warszawska	0–3	PGE Skra Bełchatów	Arena Ursynów, Warsaw; Referees: DUDEK Piotr - BURKIEWICZ Paweł
January 11, 2015; 14:45	(18–25, 22–25, 17–25) MVP: Michał Winiarski			Arena Ursynów, Warsaw; Referees: DUDEK Piotr - BURKIEWICZ Paweł

January 17, 2015; 18:00	PGE Skra Bełchatów	3–0	Cerrad Czarni Radom	Energia Hall, Bełchatów; Referees: BUDZIK Marek - IGNATOWICZ Paweł
January 17, 2015; 18:00	(26–24, 25–19, 25–20) MVP: Mariusz Wlazły			Energia Hall, Bełchatów; Referees: BUDZIK Marek - IGNATOWICZ Paweł

January 24, 2015; 17:00	Effector Kielce	0–3	PGE Skra Bełchatów	Legionów Hall, Kielce; Attendance: 3,000; Referees: GADZINA Mariusz - FLIS Tomasz
January 24, 2015; 17:00	(28–30, 18–25, 20–25) MVP: Nicolás Uriarte			Legionów Hall, Kielce; Attendance: 3,000; Referees: GADZINA Mariusz - FLIS Tomasz

January 31, 2015; 18:00	PGE Skra Bełchatów	3–0	Transfer Bydgoszcz	Energia Hall, Bełchatów; Attendance: 2,700; Referees: JANIK Tomasz - HERBIK Marcin
January 31, 2015; 18:00	(25–16, 25–16, 25–15) MVP: Karol Kłos			Energia Hall, Bełchatów; Attendance: 2,700; Referees: JANIK Tomasz - HERBIK Marcin

February 4, 2015; 20:30	Lotos Trefl Gdańsk	1–3	PGE Skra Bełchatów	Ergo Arena, Gdańsk/Sopot; Attendance: 10,635; Referees: HERBIK Marcin - JANIK Tomasz
February 4, 2015; 20:30	(25–18, 25–27, 19–25, 22–25) MVP: Nicolás Uriarte			Ergo Arena, Gdańsk/Sopot; Attendance: 10,635; Referees: HERBIK Marcin - JANIK Tomasz

February 7, 2015; 15:00	PGE Skra Bełchatów	3–0	AZS Częstochowa	Energia Hall, Bełchatów; Attendance: 2,500; Referees: BROŃSKI Jacek - MICHLIC Agnieszka
February 7, 2015; 15:00	(25–23, 25–23, 25–23) MVP: Mariusz Wlazły			Energia Hall, Bełchatów; Attendance: 2,500; Referees: BROŃSKI Jacek - MICHLIC Agnieszka

February 14, 2015; 17:00	BBTS Bielsko-Biała	1–3	PGE Skra Bełchatów	Dębowiec Sports Arena, Bielsko-Biała; Attendance: 3,000; Referees: PINDRAL Szymon - TWARDOWSKI Maciej
February 14, 2015; 17:00	(20–25, 17–25, 25–20, 22–25) MVP: Facundo Conte			Dębowiec Sports Arena, Bielsko-Biała; Attendance: 3,000; Referees: PINDRAL Szymon - TWARDOWSKI Maciej

February 21, 2015; 14:45	Asseco Resovia Rzeszów	3–1	PGE Skra Bełchatów	Podpromie Hall, Rzeszów; Attendance: 4,300; Referees: TWARDOWSKI Maciej - BURKIEWICZ Paweł
February 21, 2015; 14:45	(23–25, 37–35, 25–23, 25–15) MVP: Fabian Drzyzga			Podpromie Hall, Rzeszów; Attendance: 4,300; Referees: TWARDOWSKI Maciej - BURKIEWICZ Paweł

==== Quarterfinal ====
February 25, 2015; 18:00	ZAKSA Kędzierzyn-Koźle	0–3	PGE Skra Bełchatów	Azoty Hall, Kędzierzyn-Koźle; Attendance: 2,700; Referees: DUDEK Piotr - GADZINA Mariusz
February 25, 2015; 18:00	(23–25, 10–25, 22–25) MVP: Nicolás Uriarte			Azoty Hall, Kędzierzyn-Koźle; Attendance: 2,700; Referees: DUDEK Piotr - GADZINA Mariusz

February 28, 2015; 17:30	PGE Skra Bełchatów	3–0	ZAKSA Kędzierzyn-Koźle	Energia Hall, Kędzierzyn-Koźle; Attendance: 2,700; Referees: SKOWROŃSKI Piotr - MACIEJEWSKI Maciej
February 28, 2015; 17:30	(25–18, 25–20, 27–25) MVP: Mariusz Wlazły			Energia Hall, Kędzierzyn-Koźle; Attendance: 2,700; Referees: SKOWROŃSKI Piotr - MACIEJEWSKI Maciej

==== Semifinal ====
March 7, 2015; 14:45	PGE Skra Bełchatów	2–3	Lotos Trefl Gdańsk	Energia Hall, Bełchatów; Attendance: 2,500; Referees: LAGIERSKI Marek - KUCHNA Andrzej
March 7, 2015; 14:45	(25–22, 30–32, 25–21, 22–25, 10–15) MVP: Murphy Troy			Energia Hall, Bełchatów; Attendance: 2,500; Referees: LAGIERSKI Marek - KUCHNA Andrzej

March 14, 2015; 20:00	Lotos Trefl Gdańsk	1–3	PGE Skra Bełchatów	Ergo Arena, Gdańsk/Sopot; Attendance: 10,550; Referees: HERBIK Marcin - JANIK Tomasz
March 14, 2015; 20:00	(18–25, 25–16, 26–28, 22–25) MVP: Mariusz Wlazły			Ergo Arena, Gdańsk/Sopot; Attendance: 10,550; Referees: HERBIK Marcin - JANIK Tomasz

March 18, 2015; 20:30	PGE Skra Bełchatów	0–3	Lotos Trefl Gdańsk	Energia Hall, Bełchatów; Referees: DUDEK Piotr - GADZINA Mariusz
March 18, 2015; 20:30	(21–25, 21–25, 19–25) MVP: Wojciech Grzyb			Energia Hall, Bełchatów; Referees: DUDEK Piotr - GADZINA Mariusz

April 4, 2015; 20:30	Lotos Trefl Gdańsk	3–2	PGE Skra Bełchatów	Ergo Arena, Gdańsk/Sopot; Attendance: 8,076; Referees: MAROSZEK Wojciech, LAGIERSKI Marek
April 4, 2015; 20:30	(24–25, 27–25, 25–22, 21–25, 15–13) MVP: Murphy Troy			Ergo Arena, Gdańsk/Sopot; Attendance: 8,076; Referees: MAROSZEK Wojciech, LAGIERSKI Marek

==== 3rd place ====
April 15, 2015; 18:00	PGE Skra Bełchatów	3–1	Jastrzębski Węgiel	Energia Hall, Bełchatów; Attendance: 2,700; Referees: GADZINA Mariusz - DUDEK Piotr
April 15, 2015; 18:00	(20–25, 25–15, 25–23, 29–27) MVP: Aleksa Brđović			Energia Hall, Bełchatów; Attendance: 2,700; Referees: GADZINA Mariusz - DUDEK Piotr

April 25, 2015; 14:45	Jastrzębski Węgiel	0–3	PGE Skra Bełchatów	Hala Widowiskowo-Sportowa, Jastrzębie-Zdrój; Attendance: 2,000; Referees: JANIK Tomasz - BROŃSKI Jacek
April 25, 2015; 14:45	(21–25, 20–25, 20–25) MVP: Facundo Conte			Hala Widowiskowo-Sportowa, Jastrzębie-Zdrój; Attendance: 2,000; Referees: JANIK Tomasz - BROŃSKI Jacek

April 29, 2015; 20:00	PGE Skra Bełchatów	2–3	Jastrzębski Węgiel	Energia Hall, Bełchatów; Attendance: 2,700; Referees: SKOWROŃSKI Piotr - BROŃSKI Jacek
April 29, 2015; 20:00	(25–23, 17–25, 25–19, 18–25, 10–15) MVP: Michał Łasko			Energia Hall, Bełchatów; Attendance: 2,700; Referees: SKOWROŃSKI Piotr - BROŃSKI Jacek

May 3, 2015; 20:00	Jastrzębski Węgiel	3–2	PGE Skra Bełchatów	Hala Widowiskowo-Sportowa, Jastrzębie-Zdrój; Attendance: 2,000; Referees: IGNATOWICZ Paweł - BURKIEWICZ Paweł
May 3, 2015; 20:00	(25–20, 21–25, 26–24, 22–25, 15–12) MVP: Michał Łasko			Hala Widowiskowo-Sportowa, Jastrzębie-Zdrój; Attendance: 2,000; Referees: IGNATOWICZ Paweł - BURKIEWICZ Paweł

May 6, 2015; 20:30	PGE Skra Bełchatów	3–1	Jastrzębski Węgiel	Energia Hall, Bełchatów; Attendance: 2,600; Referees: DUDEK Piotr - GADZINA Mariusz
May 6, 2015; 20:30	(19–25, 25–23, 29–27, 25–23) MVP: Nicolas Marechal			Energia Hall, Bełchatów; Attendance: 2,600; Referees: DUDEK Piotr - GADZINA Mariusz

=== 2014–15 Polish Cup ===
==== 7th round ====
January 4, 2015; 15:00	PGE Skra Bełchatów	3–1	Indykpol AZS Olsztyn	Energia Hall, Bełchatów; Referees: BUDZIK Marek - NIEMCZURA Waldemar
January 4, 2015; 15:00	(22–25, 25–14, 25–22, 25–19)			Energia Hall, Bełchatów; Referees: BUDZIK Marek - NIEMCZURA Waldemar

==== Quarterfinal ====
January 7, 2015; 18:00	PGE Skra Bełchatów	3–1	MKS Cuprum Lubin	Energia Hall, Bełchatów; Referees: MICHLIK Agnieszka - HERBIK Marcin
January 7, 2015; 18:00	(23–25, 25–15, 25–23, 25–20)			Energia Hall, Bełchatów; Referees: MICHLIK Agnieszka - HERBIK Marcin

==== Semifinal ====
April 18, 2015; 14:45	PGE Skra Bełchatów	1–3	Lotos Trefl Gdańsk	Ergo Arena, Gdańsk/Sopot; Attendance: 5,000; Referees: MAROSZEK Wojciech - LAGIERSKI Marek
April 18, 2015; 14:45	(20–25, 23–25, 27–25, 22–25)			Ergo Arena, Gdańsk/Sopot; Attendance: 5,000; Referees: MAROSZEK Wojciech - LAGIERSKI Marek

=== 2014–15 CEV Champions League ===
==== Pool F ====
In season 2014/2015 PGE Skra has been playing in 2014–15 CEV Champions League. They won all matches in Pool F with Precura Antwerpen, Hypo Tirol Innsbruck, Jihostroj České Budějovice, with a perfect record, winning 18 and losing only 2 sets along the way.

November 5, 2014; 18:30	Jihostroj České Budějovice (Czech Republic)	1–3	(Poland) PGE Skra Bełchatów	Sportovni Hala, České Budějovice; Attendance: 1,950; Referees: RAJKOVIC Milan (CRO) - MICEVSKI Nikola (MKD)
November 5, 2014; 18:30	(20–25, 25–22, 17–25, 19–25)			Sportovni Hala, České Budějovice; Attendance: 1,950; Referees: RAJKOVIC Milan (CRO) - MICEVSKI Nikola (MKD)

November 19, 2014; 18:00	PGE Skra Bełchatów (Poland)	3–0	(Belgium) Topvolley Precura Antwerpen	Energia Hall, Bełchatów; Attendance: 2,700; Referees: CHALADAY Yanick (FRA) - KOZLOVSKYY Viktor (UKR)
November 19, 2014; 18:00	(25–17, 25–18, 25–17)			Energia Hall, Bełchatów; Attendance: 2,700; Referees: CHALADAY Yanick (FRA) - KOZLOVSKYY Viktor (UKR)

December 2, 2014; 20:25	Hypo Tirol Innsbruck (Austria)	0–3	(Poland) PGE Skra Bełchatów	Olympiahalle, Innsbruck; Attendance: 1,250; Referees: PASQUALI Fabrizio (ITA) - COLLADOS Fabrice (FRA)
December 2, 2014; 20:25	(21–25, 27–29, 24–26)			Olympiahalle, Innsbruck; Attendance: 1,250; Referees: PASQUALI Fabrizio (ITA) - COLLADOS Fabrice (FRA)

December 17, 2014; 18:00	PGE Skra Bełchatów (Poland)	3–0	(Austria) Hypo Tirol Innsbruck	Energia Hall, Bełchatów; Attendance: 1,950; Referees: CHRISTENSEN Aage (DRK) - ALMKVIST Hans (SWE)
December 17, 2014; 18:00	(25–22, 25–23, 25–23)			Energia Hall, Bełchatów; Attendance: 1,950; Referees: CHRISTENSEN Aage (DRK) - ALMKVIST Hans (SWE)

January 21, 2015; 20:30	Topvolley Precura Antwerpen (Belgium)	1–3	(Poland) PGE Skra Bełchatów	Lotto Arena, Antwerp; Attendance: 5,000; Referees: KELLENBERGER Jörg (GER) - MCDOUGALL Brian (SCT)
January 21, 2015; 20:30	(25–22, 14–25, 20–25, 19–25)			Lotto Arena, Antwerp; Attendance: 5,000; Referees: KELLENBERGER Jörg (GER) - MCDOUGALL Brian (SCT)

January 27, 2015; 20:00	PGE Skra Bełchatów (Poland)	3–0	(Czech Republic) Jihostroj České Budějovice	Energia Hall, Bełchatów; Attendance: 2,540; Referees: KNIZHNIKOV Nikolai (RUS) - SALTALIPPI Fabrizio (ITA)
January 27, 2015; 20:00	(25–17, 25–13, 26–24)			Energia Hall, Bełchatów; Attendance: 2,540; Referees: KNIZHNIKOV Nikolai (RUS) - SALTALIPPI Fabrizio (ITA)

==== Playoff 12 ====
In playoff 12 beat Italian club Cucine Lube Treia twice - 3–0 in Macerata and 3–1 at Atlas Arena, Łódź.

February 11, 2015; 20:30	Cuncine Lube Treia (Italy)	0–3	(Poland) PGE Skra Bełchatów	Palazzetto dello Sport Cizitanova Marche, Macerata; Attendance: 3,980; Referees: RYCHLIK Dusan (CZE) - PASHKEVICH Alexey (RUS)
February 11, 2015; 20:30	(22–25, 19–25, 13–25)			Palazzetto dello Sport Cizitanova Marche, Macerata; Attendance: 3,980; Referees: RYCHLIK Dusan (CZE) - PASHKEVICH Alexey (RUS)

February 19, 2015; 18:00	PGE Skra Bełchatów (Poland)	3–1	(Italy) Cuncine Lube Treia	Atlas Arena, Łódź; Referees: SODJA Harald (AUT) - MATEIZER Alin (ROM)
February 19, 2015; 18:00	(26–24, 19–25, 25–22, 25–21)			Atlas Arena, Łódź; Referees: SODJA Harald (AUT) - MATEIZER Alin (ROM)

==== Playoff 6 ====
They went to playoff 6, where their opponents were Italian Sir Safety Perugia. PGE Skra lost their first match with Italian team (2-3) and gained 1 point. In revenge match, on March 11, 2015 at Atlas Arena, Łódź PGE Skra Bełchatów beat Sir Safety Perugia 3-1, gained 3 points and went to the Final Four, which will be held in Berlin. In second match the best scorers of Polish club were Facundo Conte (17 points), Mariusz Wlazły (14) and Michał Winiarski (10), who came back to playing after injury. PGE Skra will play with another Polish team - Asseco Resovia Rzeszów and for the first time in history two Polish teams will be playing at semifinal of CEV Champions League Final Four.

March 4, 2015; 20:30	Sir Safety Perugia (Italy)	3–2	(Poland) PGE Skra Bełchatów	Palasport Evangelisti, Perugia; Attendance: 3,518; Referees: VAN GOMPEL Cor (LUK) - GRIL David (SLO)
March 4, 2015; 20:30	(25–17, 23–25, 25–23, 23–25, 16–14)			Palasport Evangelisti, Perugia; Attendance: 3,518; Referees: VAN GOMPEL Cor (LUK) - GRIL David (SLO)

March 11, 2015; 18:00	PGE Skra Bełchatów (Poland)	3–1	(Italy) Sir Safety Perugia	Atlas Arena, Łódź; Attendance: 11,500; Referees: CAMBRE Wim (BEL) - ALTIPARMAK Mehmet Ersin (TUR)
March 11, 2015; 18:00	(16–25, 25–22, 25–23, 25–18)			Atlas Arena, Łódź; Attendance: 11,500; Referees: CAMBRE Wim (BEL) - ALTIPARMAK Mehmet Ersin (TUR)

==== Final four ====
On March 28, 2015 Asseco Resovia Rzeszów beat PGE Skra Bełchatów in semifinal of 2014–15 CEV Champions League Final Four held at Max-Schmeling-Halle, Berlin. It was a historic match, where the semi-final played two Polish teams. Next day, PGE Skra lost with host team - Berlin Recycling Volleys and took 4th place in Final Four.

March 28, 2015; 20:00	PGE Skra Bełchatów (Poland)	0–3	(Poland) Asseco Resovia Rzeszów	Max-Schmeling-Halle, Berlin; Attendance: 9,000; Referees: DI GIACOMO Arturo (BEL) - SIMONOVIC Vladimir (SRB)
March 28, 2015; 20:00	(23–25, 23–25, 22–25)			Max-Schmeling-Halle, Berlin; Attendance: 9,000; Referees: DI GIACOMO Arturo (BEL) - SIMONOVIC Vladimir (SRB)

March 29, 2015; 13:00	Berlin Recycling Volleys (Germany)	3–2	(Poland) PGE Skra Bełchatów	Max-Schmeling-Halle, Berlin; Attendance: 9,025; Referees: SIMONOVIC Vladimir (SRB) - DI GIACOMO Arturo (BEL)
March 29, 2015; 13:00	(25–21, 19–25, 25–20, 26–28, 23–21)			Max-Schmeling-Halle, Berlin; Attendance: 9,025; Referees: SIMONOVIC Vladimir (SRB) - DI GIACOMO Arturo (BEL)
