= 2011–12 PGE Skra Bełchatów season =

PGE Skra Bełchatów
2011–12 season
- Chairman: Konrad Piechocki
- Manager: Jacek Nawrocki

PGE Skra Bełchatów 2011–2012 season is the 2011/2012 volleyball season for Polish professional volleyball club PGE Skra Bełchatów. The club won silver medal of Polish Championship, Polish Cup 2012 and silver medal of CEV Champions League.

The club competed in:

- Polish Championship
- Polish Cup
- CEV Champions League

== Team roster ==
Head coach:	Jacek Nawrocki
Assistant:	Maciej Bartodziejski

No.	Name	Date of birth	Position
2	(Poland) Mariusz Wlazły (C)	August 4, 1983	opposite
4	(Poland) Daniel Pliński	December 10, 1978	middle blocker
5	(Netherlands) Wytze Kooistra	June 3, 1982	middle blocker
6	(Poland) Karol Kłos	August 8, 1989	middle blocker
7	(Poland) Bartosz Kurek	August 29, 1988	outside hitter
8	(Poland) Robert Milczarek	November 28, 1983	libero
9	(Serbia) Konstantin Čupković	February 2, 1987	outside hitter
10	(Spain) Miguel Angel Falasca	April 29, 1973	setter
12	(Poland) Paweł Woicki	June 19, 1983	setter
13	(Poland) Michał Winiarski	September 28, 1983	outside hitter
14	(Serbia) Aleksandar Atanasijević	September 4, 1991	opposite
16	(Poland) Paweł Zatorski	June 21, 1990	libero
17	(Poland) Marcin Możdżonek	February 9, 1985	middle blocker
18	(Poland) Michał Bąkiewicz	February 22, 1983	outside hitter

== Squad changes for the 2011–2012 season ==
In:

No.	Player	Position	From
5	(Netherlands) Wytze Kooistra	middle blocker	Trenkwalder Modena
8	(Poland) Robert Milczarek	outside hitter/libero	Siatkarz Wieluń
9	(Serbia) Konstantin Čupković	outside hitter	M. Roma Volley
14	(Serbia) Aleksandar Atanasijević	opposite	OK Partizan

Out:

No.	Player	Position	To
5	(Czech Republic) Jakub Novotný	opposite	Jihostroj České Budějovice
11	(France) Stéphane Antiga	outside hitter	Delecta Bydgoszcz

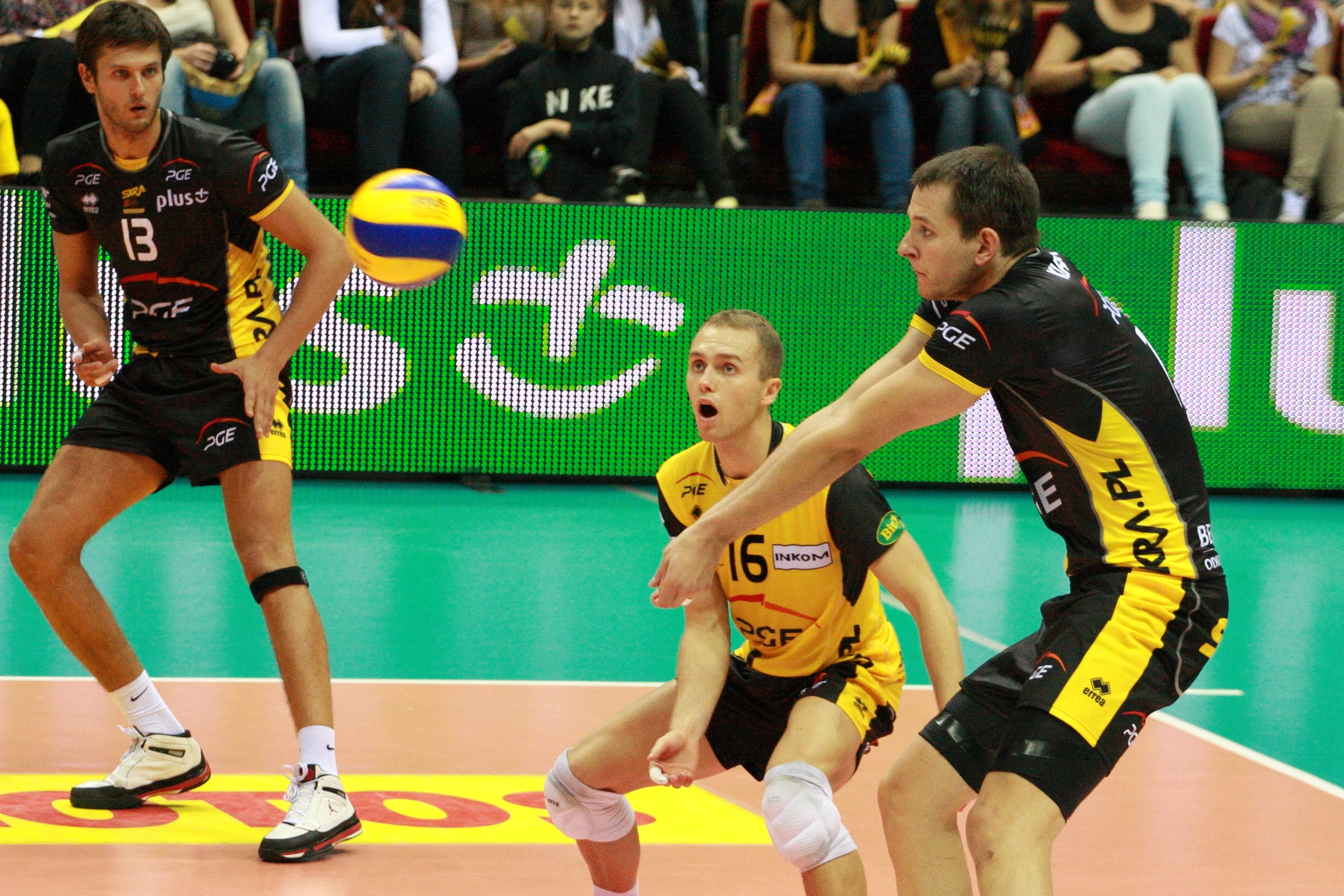
Michał Winiarski, Paweł Zatorski and Bartosz Kurek during the match against Lotos Trefl Gdańsk on September 30, 2011, Ergo Arena, Gdańsk.

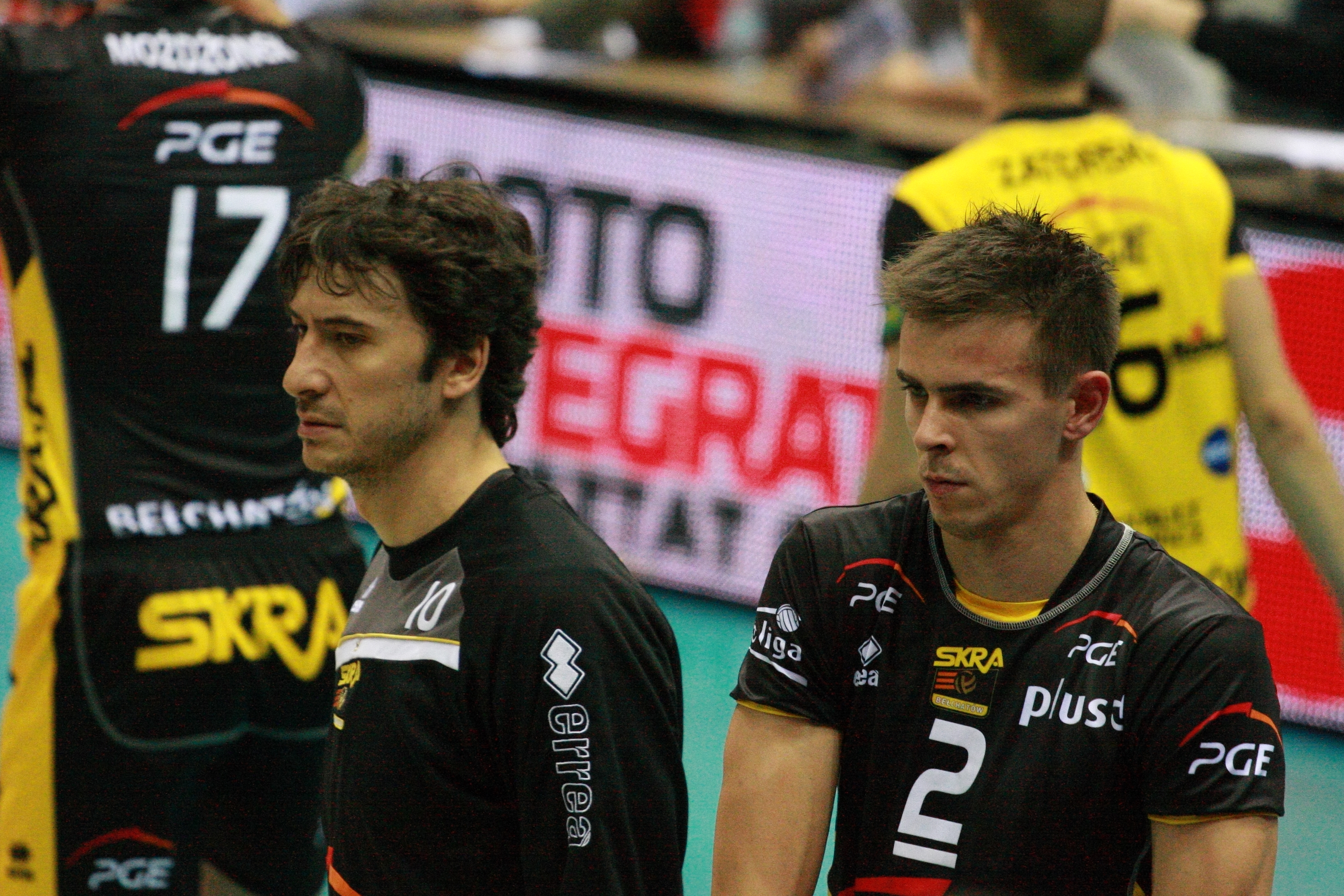
Setter Miguel Angel Falasca and opposite hitter, captain of PGE Skra Bełchatów Mariusz Wlazły during the match against Lotos Trefl Gdańsk on September 30, 2011, Ergo Arena, Gdańsk.

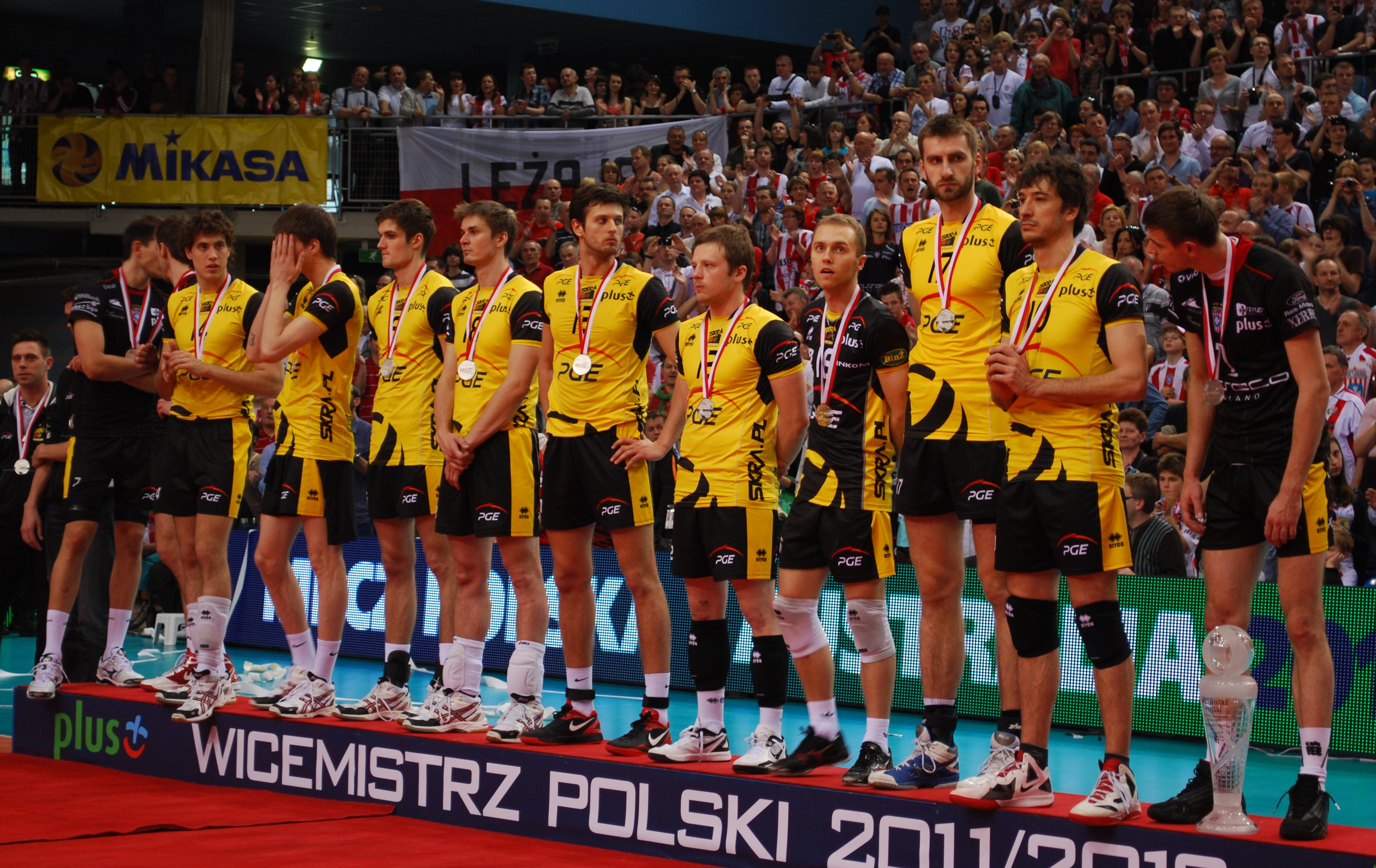
PGE Skra at the podium of Polish Championship with silver medal.

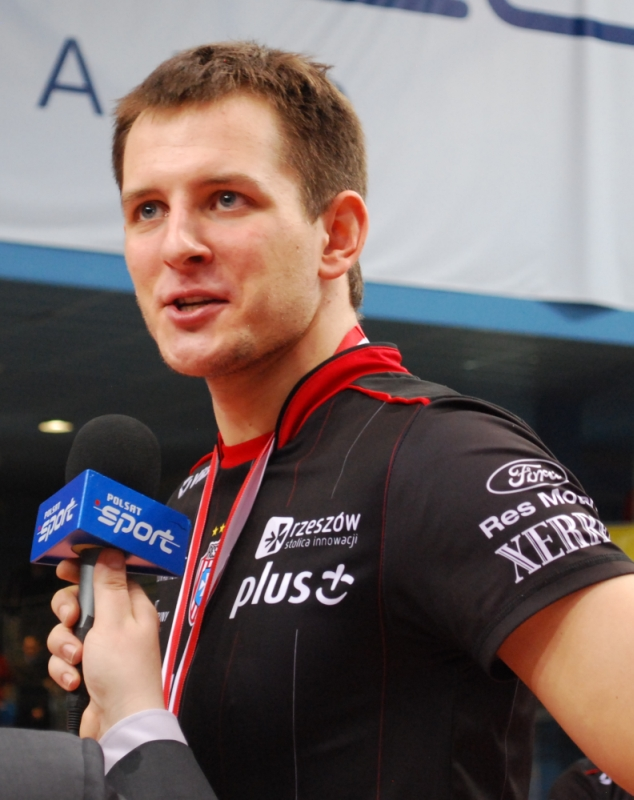
Basic player of PGE Skra in the season 2011/2012, outside hitter - Bartosz Kurek after the medal ceremony of Polish Championship.

== Most Valuable Players ==
No.	Opponent	Date	Player
1.	Lotos Trefl Gdańsk	30.09.2011	(Poland) Mariusz Wlazły
2.	AZS Częstochowa	15.10.2011	(Serbia) Aleksandar Atanasijević
3.	AZS Politechnika Warszawska	23.10.2011	(Poland) Bartosz Kurek
4.	Delecta Bydgoszcz	29.10.2011	(Poland) Daniel Pliński
5.	Jastrzębski Węgiel	05.11.2011	(Poland) Mariusz Wlazły
6.	Indykpol AZS Olsztyn	10.12.2011	(Poland) Daniel Pliński
7.	Fart Kielce	17.12.2011	(Poland) Michał Winiarski
8.	Lotos Trefl Gdańsk	29.12.2011	(Poland) Bartosz Kurek
9.	ZAKSA Kędzierzyn-Koźle	15.01.2012	(Poland) Daniel Pliński
10.	Asseco Resovia Rzeszów	28.01.2012	(Poland) Bartosz Kurek
11.	Tytan AZS Częstochowa	05.02.2012	(Spain) Miguel Angel Falasca
12.	AZS Politechnika Warszawska	11.02.2012	(Poland) Mariusz Wlazły
13.	Delecta Bydgoszcz	15.02.2012	(Poland) Bartosz Kurek
14.	Jastrzębski Węgiel	18.02.2012	(Poland) Michał Winiarski
15.	Indykpol AZS Olsztyn	25.02.2012	(Poland) Michał Winiarski
16.	Fart Kielce	03.03.2012	(Poland) Michał Winiarski
17.	AZS Politechnika Warszawska	10.03.2012	(Poland) Bartosz Kurek
18.	AZS Politechnika Warszawska	11.03.2012	(Poland) Karol Kłos
19.	AZS Politechnika Warszawska	21.03.2012	(Spain) Miguel Angel Falasca
20.	Jastrzębski Węgiel	04.04.2012	(Poland) Mariusz Wlazły
21.	Jastrzębski Węgiel	05.04.2012	(Poland) Bartosz Kurek
22.	Jastrzębski Węgiel	10.04.2012	(Poland) Bartosz Kurek
23.	Asseco Resovia Rzeszów	21.04.2012	(Poland) Daniel Pliński

=== General classification ===
No.	Player	MVP
1.	(Poland) Bartosz Kurek	7
2.	(Poland) Mariusz Wlazły	4
	(Poland) Michał Winiarski	4
	(Poland) Daniel Pliński	4
5.	(Spain) Miguel Angel Falasca	2
6	(Poland) Karol Kłos	1
	(Serbia) Aleksandar Atanasijević	1

== Results, schedules and standings ==
=== 2011–12 PlusLiga ===
==== Regular season ====
September 30, 2011; 20:00	Lotos Trefl Gdańsk	1–3	PGE Skra Bełchatów	Ergo Arena, Gdańsk; Referees: Sylwester Strzylak, Maciej Twardowski
September 30, 2011; 20:00	(18–25, 21–25, 25–23, 20–25)			Ergo Arena, Gdańsk; Referees: Sylwester Strzylak, Maciej Twardowski

October 8, 2011; 14:30	PGE Skra Bełchatów	0–3	ZAKSA Kędzierzyn-Koźle	Energia Hall, Bełchatów; Referees: Wojciech Maroszek, Piotr Król
October 8, 2011; 14:30	(23–25, 21–25, 19–25)			Energia Hall, Bełchatów; Referees: Wojciech Maroszek, Piotr Król

October 12, 2011; 20:00	Asseco Resovia Rzeszów	3–2	PGE Skra Bełchatów	Podpromie Hall, Rzeszów; Referees: Marcin Herbik, Tomasz Janik
October 12, 2011; 20:00	(25–22, 19–25, 25–22, 25–26, 20–18)			Podpromie Hall, Rzeszów; Referees: Marcin Herbik, Tomasz Janik

October 15, 2011; 17:00	PGE Skra Bełchatów	3–1	Tytan AZS Częstochowa	Energia Hall, Bełchatów; Referees: Piotr Dudek, Paweł Burkiewicz
October 15, 2011; 17:00	(29–31, 25–21, 25–20, 25–22)			Energia Hall, Bełchatów; Referees: Piotr Dudek, Paweł Burkiewicz

October 23, 2011; 15:50	AZS Politechnika Warszawska	2–3	PGE Skra Bełchatów	Arena Ursynów, Warsaw; Referees: Jacek Sęk, Maciej Maciejewski
October 23, 2011; 15:50	(25–23, 17–25, 20–25, 25–22, 6–15)			Arena Ursynów, Warsaw; Referees: Jacek Sęk, Maciej Maciejewski

October 29, 2011; 16:00	PGE Skra Bełchatów	3–0	Delecta Bydgoszcz	Energia Hall, Bełchatów; Referees: Wojciech Kasprzyk, Jacek Hojka
October 29, 2011; 16:00	(25–19, 25–22, 25–20)			Energia Hall, Bełchatów; Referees: Wojciech Kasprzyk, Jacek Hojka

November 5, 2011; 14:30	Jastrzębski Węgiel	1–3	PGE Skra Bełchatów	Hala Sportowa, Jastrzębie-Zdrój; Referees: Tomasz Janik, Janusz Soból
November 5, 2011; 14:30	(19–25, 18–25, 25–22, 22–25)			Hala Sportowa, Jastrzębie-Zdrój; Referees: Tomasz Janik, Janusz Soból

December 10, 2011; 17:00	PGE Skra Bełchatów	3–0	Indykpol AZS Olsztyn	Energia Hall, Bełchatów; Referees: Wojciech Maroszek, Paweł Burkiewicz
December 10, 2011; 17:00	(25–20, 25–15, 16–24)			Energia Hall, Bełchatów; Referees: Wojciech Maroszek, Paweł Burkiewicz

December 17, 2011; 14:30	Fart Kielce	2–3	PGE Skra Bełchatów	Legionów Hall, Kielce; Referees: Tomasz Janik, Marcin Herbik
December 17, 2011; 14:30	(25–23, 21–25, 25–19, 13–25, 11–15)			Legionów Hall, Kielce; Referees: Tomasz Janik, Marcin Herbik

December 29, 2011; 17:00	PGE Skra Bełchatów	3–0	Lotos Trefl Gdańsk	Energia Hall, Bełchatów; Referees: Piotr Dudek, Mariusz Gadzina
December 29, 2011; 17:00	(25–20, 25–23, 25–10)			Energia Hall, Bełchatów; Referees: Piotr Dudek, Mariusz Gadzina

January 15, 2012; 18:00	ZAKSA Kędzierzyn-Koźle	1–3	PGE Skra Bełchatów	Azoty Hall, Kędzierzyn-Koźle; Referees: Wojciech Maroszek, Maciej Twardowski
January 15, 2012; 18:00	(25–23, 22–25, 25–27, 27–29)			Azoty Hall, Kędzierzyn-Koźle; Referees: Wojciech Maroszek, Maciej Twardowski

January 28, 2012; 20:00	PGE Skra Bełchatów	3–0	Asseco Resovia Rzeszów	Energia Hall, Bełchatów; Referees: Krzysztof Szmydyński, Maciej Hojka
January 28, 2012; 20:00	(25–16, 29–27, 25–16)			Energia Hall, Bełchatów; Referees: Krzysztof Szmydyński, Maciej Hojka

February 5, 2012; 18:00	Tytan AZS Częstochowa	0–3	PGE Skra Bełchatów	Polonia Hall, Częstochowa; Referees: Maciej Twardowski, Sylwester Strzylak
February 5, 2012; 18:00	(16–25, 24–26, 24–26)			Polonia Hall, Częstochowa; Referees: Maciej Twardowski, Sylwester Strzylak

February 11, 2012; 16:00	PGE Skra Bełchatów	3–2	AZS Politechnika Warszawska	Energia Hall, Bełchatów; Referees: Piotr Król, Robert Dworak
February 11, 2012; 16:00	(21–25, 25–17, 26–24, 23–25, 15–13)			Energia Hall, Bełchatów; Referees: Piotr Król, Robert Dworak

February 15, 2012; 18:00	Delecta Bydgoszcz	0–3	PGE Skra Bełchatów	Łuczniczka, Bydgoszcz; Referees: Maciej Maciejewski, Krzysztof Szmydyński
February 15, 2012; 18:00	(31–33, 16–25, 17–25)			Łuczniczka, Bydgoszcz; Referees: Maciej Maciejewski, Krzysztof Szmydyński

February 18, 2012; 14:30	PGE Skra Bełchatów	3–0	Jastrzębski Węgiel	Energia Hall, Bełchatów; Referees: Paweł Burkiewicz, Piotr Dudek
February 18, 2012; 14:30	(25–18, 25–23, 25–21)			Energia Hall, Bełchatów; Referees: Paweł Burkiewicz, Piotr Dudek

February 25, 2012; 17:00	Indykpol AZS Olsztyn	1–3	PGE Skra Bełchatów	Urania Hall, Olsztyn; Referees: Tomasz Janik, Marcin Herbik
February 25, 2012; 17:00	(17–25, 25–20, 20–25, 17–25)			Urania Hall, Olsztyn; Referees: Tomasz Janik, Marcin Herbik

March 3, 2012; 16:00	PGE Skra Bełchatów	3–1	Fart Kielce	Energia Hall, Bełchatów; Referees: Marcin Herbik, Sylwester Strzylak
March 3, 2012; 16:00	(29–27, 25–15, 22–25, 25–22)			Energia Hall, Bełchatów; Referees: Marcin Herbik, Sylwester Strzylak

==== Quarterfinal ====
March 10, 2012; 14:30	PGE Skra Bełchatów	3–0	AZS Politechnika Warszawska	Energia Hall, Bełchatów; Referees: Robert Dworak, Waldemar Niemczura
March 10, 2012; 14:30	(25–23, 25–21, 25–21)			Energia Hall, Bełchatów; Referees: Robert Dworak, Waldemar Niemczura

March 11, 2012; 14:30	PGE Skra Bełchatów	3–0	AZS Politechnika Warszawska	Energia Hall, Bełchatów; Referees: Mariusz Gadzina, Jacek Sęk
March 11, 2012; 14:30	(25–21, 25–21, 25–17)			Energia Hall, Bełchatów; Referees: Mariusz Gadzina, Jacek Sęk

March 21, 2012; 18:00	AZS Politechnika Warszawska	0–3	PGE Skra Bełchatów	Arena Ursynów, Warsaw; Referees: Wojciech Kasprzyk, Wojciech Maroszek
March 21, 2012; 18:00	(14–25, 16–25, 23–25)			Arena Ursynów, Warsaw; Referees: Wojciech Kasprzyk, Wojciech Maroszek

==== Semifinal ====
April 4, 2012; 20:45	PGE Skra Bełchatów	3–2	Jastrzębski Węgiel	Energia Hall, Bełchatów; Referees: Tomasz Janik, Marcin Herbik
April 4, 2012; 20:45	(18–25, 25–22, 21–25, 25–22, 15–11)			Energia Hall, Bełchatów; Referees: Tomasz Janik, Marcin Herbik

April 5, 2012; 20:45	PGE Skra Bełchatów	3–0	Jastrzębski Węgiel	Energia Hall, Bełchatów; Referees: Jacek Sęk, Maciej Maciejewski
April 5, 2012; 20:45	(25–19, 27–25, 25–20)			Energia Hall, Bełchatów; Referees: Jacek Sęk, Maciej Maciejewski

April 10, 2012; 17:30	Jastrzębski Węgiel	2–3	PGE Skra Bełchatów	Hala Sportowa, Jastrzębie-Zdrój; Referees: Paweł Burkiewicz, Piotr Dudek
April 10, 2012; 17:30	(25–23, 19–25, 25–21, 26–28, 12–15)			Hala Sportowa, Jastrzębie-Zdrój; Referees: Paweł Burkiewicz, Piotr Dudek

==== Final ====
April 17, 2012; 18:00	PGE Skra Bełchatów	1–3	Asseco Resovia Rzeszów	Energia Hall, Bełchatów; Referees: Maciej Maciejewski, Paweł Burkiewicz
April 17, 2012; 18:00	(25–18, 24–26, 16–25, 18–25)			Energia Hall, Bełchatów; Referees: Maciej Maciejewski, Paweł Burkiewicz

April 18, 2012; 18:00	PGE Skra Bełchatów	1–3	Asseco Resovia Rzeszów	Energia Hall, Bełchatów; Referees: Wojciech Maroszek, Piotr Król
April 18, 2012; 18:00	(21–25, 19–25, 26–24, 15–25)			Energia Hall, Bełchatów; Referees: Wojciech Maroszek, Piotr Król

April 21, 2012; 18:00	Asseco Resovia Rzeszów	1–3	PGE Skra Bełchatów	Podpromie Hall, Rzeszów; Referees: Sylwester Strzylak, Maciej Twardowski
April 21, 2012; 18:00	(19–25, 15–25, 25–16, 20–25)			Podpromie Hall, Rzeszów; Referees: Sylwester Strzylak, Maciej Twardowski

April 22, 2012; 14:00	Asseco Resovia Rzeszów	3–0	PGE Skra Bełchatów	Podpromie Hall, Rzeszów; Referees: Tomasz Janik, Marcin Herbik
April 22, 2012; 14:00	(25–23, 25–21, 25–15)			Podpromie Hall, Rzeszów; Referees: Tomasz Janik, Marcin Herbik

=== Polish Cup 2012 ===
==== Quarterfinal ====
January 4, 2012	MKS MOS Interpromex Będzin	0–3	PGE Skra Bełchatów
January 4, 2012	(18–25, 22–25, 23–25)

January 6, 2012	PGE Skra Bełchatów	3–0	MKS MOS Interpromex Będzin	Energia Hall, Bełchatów
January 6, 2012	(25–14, 25–17, 25–14)			Energia Hall, Bełchatów

==== Semifinal ====
January 21, 2012	Asseco Resovia Rzeszów	1–3	PGE Skra Bełchatów	Podpromie Hall, Rzeszów
January 21, 2012	(25–21, 24–26, 23–25, 23–25)			Podpromie Hall, Rzeszów

==== Final ====
January 22, 2012; 14:30	Jastrzębski Węgiel	0–3	PGE Skra Bełchatów	Podpromie Hall, Rzeszów
January 22, 2012; 14:30	(16–25, 20–25, 19–25)			Podpromie Hall, Rzeszów

=== CEV Champions League 2011-12 ===
==== Pool F ====
October 20, 2011; 18:00	Budvanska Rivijera Budva (Montenegro)	0–3	(Poland) PGE Skra Bełchatów	Mediteranski Sportski Centar, Budva; Attendance: 680; Referees: SATANASSI Omero, GEORGOULEAS Georgios
October 20, 2011; 18:00	(21–25, 17–25, 22–25)			Mediteranski Sportski Centar, Budva; Attendance: 680; Referees: SATANASSI Omero, GEORGOULEAS Georgios

October 26, 2011; 18:00	PGE Skra Bełchatów (Poland)	3–1	(France) Tours VB	Hala MOSiR, Łódź; Attendance: 8,800; Referees: MEZÖFFY Zsolt, MATEIZER Alin
October 26, 2011; 18:00	(25–22, 25–21, 19–25, 25–22)			Hala MOSiR, Łódź; Attendance: 8,800; Referees: MEZÖFFY Zsolt, MATEIZER Alin

December 14, 2011; 18:00	PGE Skra Bełchatów (Poland)	3–2	(Slovenia) ACH Volley Ljubljana	Hala MOSiR, Łódź; Attendance: 9,500; Referees: HODON Dusan, MARKOV Victor
December 14, 2011; 18:00	(23–25, 28–30, 25–21, 25–18, 15–12)			Hala MOSiR, Łódź; Attendance: 9,500; Referees: HODON Dusan, MARKOV Victor

December 20, 2011; 20:30	ACH Volley Ljubljana (Slovenia)	0–3	(Poland) PGE Skra Bełchatów	Dvorana Center, Stozice; Attendance: 7,700; Referees: MICEVSKI Nikola, YENER Aziz
December 20, 2011; 20:30	(32–34, 18–25, 21–25)			Dvorana Center, Stozice; Attendance: 7,700; Referees: MICEVSKI Nikola, YENER Aziz

January 12, 2012; 20:30	Tours VB (France)	3–0	(Poland) PGE Skra Bełchatów	Salle Robert Grenon, Tours; Attendance: 2,900; Referees: RODRIGUEZ JATIVA Susana Maria, RIETFORT Thomas
January 12, 2012; 20:30	(25–22, 25–21, 26–24)			Salle Robert Grenon, Tours; Attendance: 2,900; Referees: RODRIGUEZ JATIVA Susana Maria, RIETFORT Thomas

January 18, 2012; 18:00	PGE Skra Bełchatów (Poland)	3–0	(Montenegro) Budvanska Rivijera Budva	Hala MOSiR, Łódź; Attendance: 9,000; Referees: CINATL Rene, FLÜCKIGER Adrian
January 18, 2012; 18:00	(25–16, 25–15, 25–17)			Hala MOSiR, Łódź; Attendance: 9,000; Referees: CINATL Rene, FLÜCKIGER Adrian

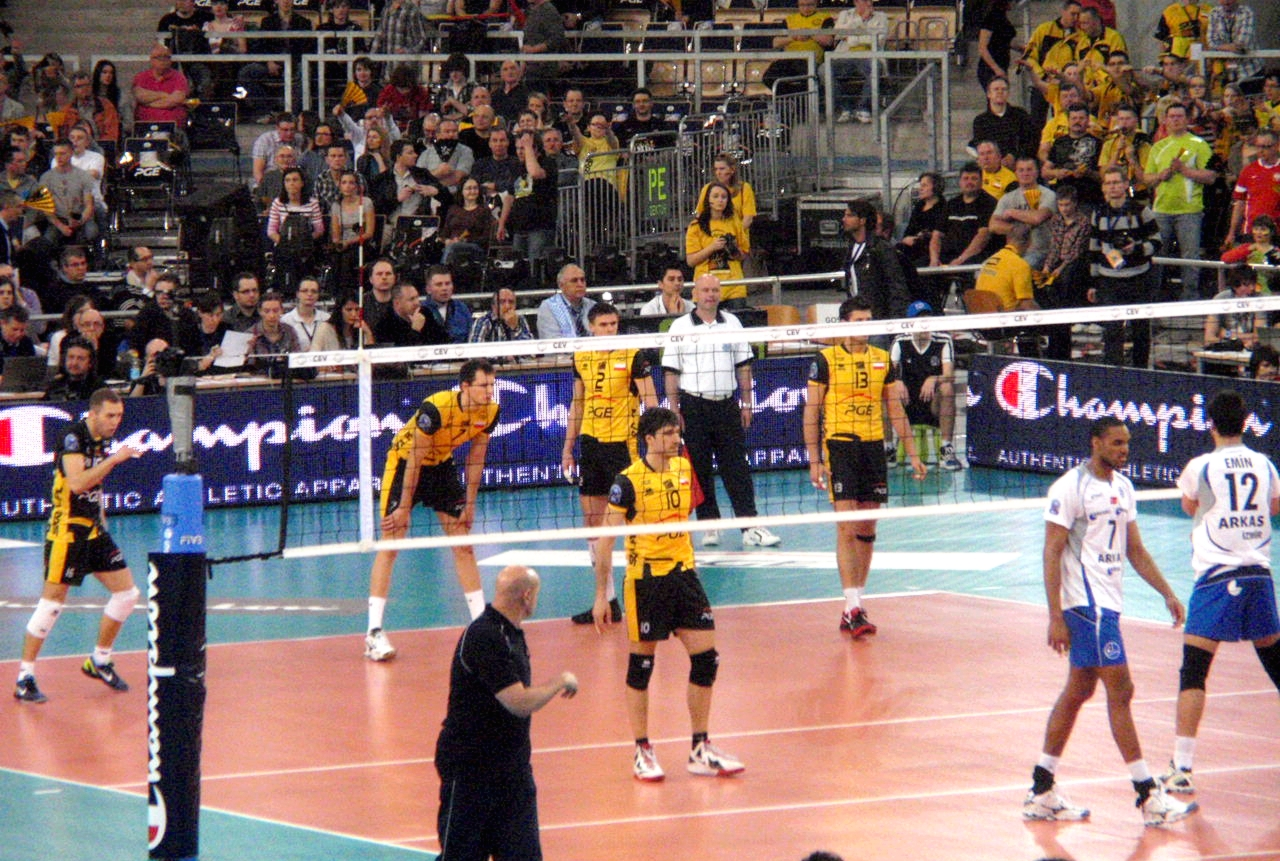
PGE Skra vs Arkas Izmir in semifinal of Final Four on March 17, 2012.

==== Final four ====
PGE Skra achieve silver medal of CEV Champions League. They won the match against Arkas Izmir in semifinal, but losing final against Russian club - VC Zenit-Kazan in the Final Four in Łódź, Poland. The final match ended controversially, because the referee didn't see the block of Russian player and ended the match despite the fact that audience and all players saw the error on screen. PGE Skra players received 3 of 8 individual awards. Best Receiver was Michał Winiarski, the award for Best Spiker received Bartosz Kurek and title of Most Valuable Player gained team captain - Mariusz Wlazły.

March 17, 2012; 14:37	PGE Skra Bełchatów (Poland)	3–0	(Turkey) Arkas Izmir	Atlas Arena, Łódź; Attendance: 13,000; Referees: LABASTA Milan, JOVANOVIC Dejan
March 17, 2012; 14:37	(25–23, 25–21, 28–26)			Atlas Arena, Łódź; Attendance: 13,000; Referees: LABASTA Milan, JOVANOVIC Dejan

March 18, 2012; 17:37	PGE Skra Bełchatów (Poland)	2–3	(Russia) VC Zenit-Kazan	Atlas Arena, Łódź; Attendance: 13,000; Referees: JOVANOVIC Dejan, LABASTA Milan
March 18, 2012; 17:37	(15–25, 25–16, 25–22, 24–26, 15–17)			Atlas Arena, Łódź; Attendance: 13,000; Referees: JOVANOVIC Dejan, LABASTA Milan
