= 2010–11 PGE Skra Bełchatów season =

PGE Skra Bełchatów
2010–11 season
- Chairman: Konrad Piechocki
- Manager: Jacek Nawrocki
- Polish Championship: (7th title)

PGE Skra Bełchatów 2010–2011 season is the 2010/2011 volleyball season for Polish professional volleyball club PGE Skra Bełchatów. The club won 7th title of Polish Champion, Polish Cup 2011 and silver medal of FIVB Club World Championship.

The club competed in:

- Polish Championship
- Polish Cup
- CEV Champions League
- FIVB Club World Championship

== Team roster ==
Head coach:	Jacek Nawrocki
Assistant:	Maciej Bartodziejski

No.	Name	Date of birth	Position
2	(Poland) Mariusz Wlazły (C)	August 4, 1983	opposite
4	(Poland) Daniel Pliński	December 10, 1978	middle blocker
5	(Czech Republic) Jakub Novotný	April 20, 1979	opposite
6	(Poland) Karol Kłos	August 8, 1989	middle blocker
7	(Poland) Bartosz Kurek	August 29, 1988	outside hitter
10	(Spain) Miguel Angel Falasca	April 29, 1973	setter
11	(France) Stéphane Antiga	February 3, 1976	outside hitter
12	(Poland) Paweł Woicki	June 19, 1983	setter
13	(Poland) Michał Winiarski	September 28, 1983	outside hitter
14	(Poland) Radosław Wnuk	September 25, 1978	middle blocker
16	(Poland) Paweł Zatorski	June 21, 1990	libero
17	(Poland) Marcin Możdżonek	February 9, 1985	middle blocker
18	(Poland) Michał Bąkiewicz	February 22, 1983	outside hitter

== Squad changes for the 2010–2011 season ==
In:

No.	Player	Position	From
6	(Poland) Karol Kłos	middle blocker	AZS Politechnika Warszawska
12	(Poland) Paweł Woicki	setter	Delecta Bydgoszcz
16	(Poland) Paweł Zatorski	libero	AZS Częstochowa

Out:

No.	Player	Position	To
1	(Poland) Maciej Dobrowolski	setter	Fart Kielce
3	(Poland) Piotr Gacek	libero	ZAKSA Kędzierzyn-Koźle

== Most Valuable Players ==
No.	Opponent	Date	Player
1.	Fart Kielce	22.10.2010	(Spain) Miguel Angel Falasca
2.	Jastrzębski Węgiel	27.10.2010	(Poland) Michał Bąkiewicz
3.	AZS Częstochowa	06.11.2010	(Poland) Mariusz Wlazły
4.	Delecta Bydgoszcz	10.11.2010	(Czech Republic) Jakub Novotny
5.	Indykpol AZS Olsztyn	13.11.2010	(Poland) Bartosz Kurek
6.	Pamapol Wielton Wieluń	20.11.2010	(Poland) Michał Winiarski
7.	AZS Politechnika Warszawska	27.11.2010	(France) Stephane Antiga
8.	Fart Kielce	01.12.2010	(Poland) Bartosz Kurek
9.	Jastrzębski Węgiel	04.12.2010	(Poland) Michał Winiarski
10.	Tytan AZS Częstochowa	29.12.2010	(Poland) Mariusz Wlazły
11.	Asseco Resovia Rzeszów	30.12.2010	(Poland) Michał Winiarski
12.	ZAKSA Kędzierzyn-Koźle	02.01.2011	(Poland) Mariusz Wlazły
13.	Delecta Bydgoszcz	08.01.2011	(Poland) Michał Winiarski
14.	Indykpol AZS Olsztyn	15.01.2011	(Poland) Daniel Pliński
15.	Pamapol Wielton Wieluń	17.01.2011	(Poland) Bartosz Kurek
16.	AZS Politechnika Warszawska	26.01.2011	(Czech Republic) Jakub Novotny
17.	Delecta Bydgoszcz	29.01.2011	(France) Stephane Antiga
18.	Asseco Resovia Rzeszów	05.02.2011	(Poland) Daniel Pliński
19.	ZAKSA Kędzierzyn-Koźle	12.02.2011	(Poland) Mariusz Wlazły
20.	Tytan AZS Częstochowa	16.02.2011	(Poland) Michał Bąkiewicz
21.	AZS Politechnika Warszawska	19.02.2011	(Poland) Mariusz Wlazły
22.	Delecta Bydgoszcz	26.02.2011	(Poland) Mariusz Wlazły
23.	ZAKSA Kędzierzyn-Koźle	23.03.2011	(Poland) Paweł Zatorski
24.	Tytan AZS Częstochowa	26.03.2011	(Poland) Michał Winiarski
25.	Tytan AZS Częstochowa	02.04.2011	(Poland) Bartosz Kurek
26.	Tytan AZS Częstochowa	03.04.2011	(Poland) Bartosz Kurek
27.	Tytan AZS Częstochowa	06.04.2011	(Poland) Bartosz Kurek
28.	ZAKSA Kędzierzyn-Koźle	15.04.2011	(France) Stephane Antiga
29.	ZAKSA Kędzierzyn-Koźle	20.04.2011	(Poland) Mariusz Wlazły
30.	ZAKSA Kędzierzyn-Koźle	21.04.2011	(France) Stephane Antiga

=== General classification ===
No.	Player	MVP
1.	(Poland) Mariusz Wlazły	7
2.	(Poland) Bartosz Kurek	6
3.	(Poland) Michał Winiarski	5
4.	(France) Stephane Antiga	4
5.	(Poland) Michał Bąkiewicz	2
	(Czech Republic) Jakub Novotny	2
	(Poland) Daniel Pliński	2
8.	(Spain) Miguel Angel Falasca	1
	(Poland) Paweł Zatorski	1

== Results, schedules and standings ==
=== 2010–11 PlusLiga ===
==== Regular season ====
October 22, 2010; 18:00	Fart Kielce	0–3	PGE Skra Bełchatów	Legionów Hall, Kielce; Referees: BURKIEWICZ Paweł - LEMEK Andrzej
October 22, 2010; 18:00	(20–25, 18–25, 16–25)			Legionów Hall, Kielce; Referees: BURKIEWICZ Paweł - LEMEK Andrzej

October 27, 2010; 18:00	PGE Skra Bełchatów	3–2	Jastrzębski Węgiel	Energia Hall, Bełchatów; Referees: LEMEK Andrzej - DUDEK Piotr
October 27, 2010; 18:00	(25–18, 17–25, 25–15, 19–25, 15–13)			Energia Hall, Bełchatów; Referees: LEMEK Andrzej - DUDEK Piotr

October 30, 2010; 14:45	Asseco Resovia Rzeszów	3–1	PGE Skra Bełchatów	Podpromie Hall, Rzeszów; Referees: MAROSZEK Wojciech - LEMEK Andrzej
October 30, 2010; 14:45	(25–21, 25–19, 17–25, 25–19)			Podpromie Hall, Rzeszów; Referees: MAROSZEK Wojciech - LEMEK Andrzej

November 3, 2010; 18:00	PGE Skra Bełchatów	3–2	ZAKSA Kędzierzyn-Koźle	Energia Hall, Bełchatów; Referees: STRZYLAK Sylwester - SOBÓL Janusz
November 3, 2010; 18:00	(26–24, 17–25, 25–20, 19–25, 18–16)			Energia Hall, Bełchatów; Referees: STRZYLAK Sylwester - SOBÓL Janusz

November 6, 2010; 17:00	Tytan AZS Częstochowa	0–3	PGE Skra Bełchatów	Polonia Hall, Częstochowa; Referees: TWARDOWSKI Maciej - SOBÓL Janusz
November 6, 2010; 17:00	(21–25, 21–25, 21–25)			Polonia Hall, Częstochowa; Referees: TWARDOWSKI Maciej - SOBÓL Janusz

November 10, 2010; 18:00	PGE Skra Bełchatów	3–0	Delecta Bydgoszcz	Energia Hall, Bełchatów; Referees: BURKIEWICZ Paweł - LEMEK Andrzej
November 10, 2010; 18:00	(25–16, 25–22, 25–18)			Energia Hall, Bełchatów; Referees: BURKIEWICZ Paweł - LEMEK Andrzej

November 13, 2010; 14:45	Indykpol AZS Olsztyn	0–3	PGE Skra Bełchatów	Urania Hall, Olsztyn; Referees: JANIK Tomasz - TWARDOWSKI Maciej
November 13, 2010; 14:45	(13–25, 12–25, 23–25)			Urania Hall, Olsztyn; Referees: JANIK Tomasz - TWARDOWSKI Maciej

November 20, 2010; 19:00	PGE Skra Bełchatów	3–0	Pamapol Wielton Wieluń	Energia Hall, Bełchatów; Referees: HERBIK Marcin - JANIK Tomasz
November 20, 2010; 19:00	(25–22, 25–22, 25–14)			Energia Hall, Bełchatów; Referees: HERBIK Marcin - JANIK Tomasz

November 27, 2010; 14:45	AZS Politechnika Warszawska	0–3	PGE Skra Bełchatów	Torwar Hall, Warsaw; Referees: KRÓL Piotr - KASPRZYK Wojciech
November 27, 2010; 14:45	(22–25, 21–25, 16–25)			Torwar Hall, Warsaw; Referees: KRÓL Piotr - KASPRZYK Wojciech

December 1, 2010; 18:00	PGE Skra Bełchatów	3–0	Fart Kielce	Energia Hall, Bełchatów; Referees: KRÓL Piotr - TWARDOWSKI Maciej
December 1, 2010; 18:00	(25–15, 25–19, 25–12)			Energia Hall, Bełchatów; Referees: KRÓL Piotr - TWARDOWSKI Maciej

December 4, 2010; 14:45	Jastrzębski Węgiel	1–3	PGE Skra Bełchatów	Hala Sportowo-Widowiskowa, Jastrzębie-Zdrój; Referees: HOJKA Jacek - JACYNA Grzegorz
December 4, 2010; 14:45	(25–22, 22–25, 19–25, 19–25)			Hala Sportowo-Widowiskowa, Jastrzębie-Zdrój; Referees: HOJKA Jacek - JACYNA Grzegorz

December 29, 2010; 17:00	PGE Skra Bełchatów	3–1	Tytan AZS Częstochowa	Energia Hall, Bełchatów; Referees: GADZINA Mariusz - DWORAK Robert
December 29, 2010; 17:00	(19–25, 25–22, 25–14, 27–25)			Energia Hall, Bełchatów; Referees: GADZINA Mariusz - DWORAK Robert

December 30, 2010; 20:30	PGE Skra Bełchatów	3–1	Asseco Resovia Rzeszów	Energia Hall, Bełchatów; Referees: HERBIK Marcin - JANIK Tomasz
December 30, 2010; 20:30	(25–20, 25–22, 16–25, 25–14)			Energia Hall, Bełchatów; Referees: HERBIK Marcin - JANIK Tomasz

January 2, 2011; 14:45	ZAKSA Kędzierzyn-Koźle	2–3	PGE Skra Bełchatów	Azoty Hall, Kędzierzyn-Koźle; Referees: DWOREK Robert - SOBÓL Janusz
January 2, 2011; 14:45	(25–22, 25–19, 21–25, 14–25, 8–15)			Azoty Hall, Kędzierzyn-Koźle; Referees: DWOREK Robert - SOBÓL Janusz

January 8, 2011; 17:00	Delecta Bydgoszcz	1–3	PGE Skra Bełchatów	Łuczniczka, Bydgoszcz; Referees: JANIK Tomasz - HERBIK Marcin
January 8, 2011; 17:00	(35–33, 21–25, 17–25, 21–25)			Łuczniczka, Bydgoszcz; Referees: JANIK Tomasz - HERBIK Marcin

January 15, 2011; 16:00	PGE Skra Bełchatów	3–0	Indykpol AZS Olsztyn	Energia Hall, Bełchatów; Referees: MAROSZEK Wojciech - KASPRZYK Wojciech
January 15, 2011; 16:00	(25–19, 25–19, 25–22)			Energia Hall, Bełchatów; Referees: MAROSZEK Wojciech - KASPRZYK Wojciech

January 17, 2011; 18:00	Pamapol Wielton Wieluń	2–3	PGE Skra Bełchatów	Hala WOSiR, Wieluń; Referees: DUDEK Piotr - BURKIEWICZ Paweł
January 17, 2011; 18:00	(15–25, 25–22, 25–21, 19–25, 13–15)			Hala WOSiR, Wieluń; Referees: DUDEK Piotr - BURKIEWICZ Paweł

January 26, 2011; 18:00	PGE Skra Bełchatów	3–1	AZS Politechnika Warszawska	Energia Hall, Bełchatów; Referees: SOKÓŁ Katarzyna - JACYNA Grzegorz
January 26, 2011; 18:00	(25–17, 22–25, 25–21, 25–12)			Energia Hall, Bełchatów; Referees: SOKÓŁ Katarzyna - JACYNA Grzegorz
