= Jędrzej Maćkowiak =

Polish volleyball player (born 1992)

Personal information
- Full name: Jędrzej Maćkowiak
- Nationality: Polish
- Born: October 17, 1992 (age 34); Bełchatów, Poland
- Height: 1.98 m (6 ft 6 in)
- Weight: 86 kg (190 lb)
- Spike: 345 cm (136 in)
- Block: 325 cm (128 in)

Volleyball information
- Position: Middle blocker
- Current club: Krispol Września

Career
Years	Teams
2006–2012; 2012–2014; 2014–2017; 2017–	Skra Bełchatów U23; PGE Skra Bełchatów; Effector Kielce; Krispol Września
- Last updated: 30 December 2017

Jędrzej Maćkowiak (born 17 October 1992) is a Polish volleyball player, a member of Polish club Krispol Września, 2014 Polish Champion.

== Career ==
Maćkowiak is an alumnus of Skra Bełchatów. He debuted in first squad of PGE Skra in season 2012/2013. On May 27, 2014, his team won a title of Polish Champion after final matches against Asseco Resovia Rzeszów. In June 2014 went to Effector Kielce.

== Sporting achievements ==
=== Clubs ===
==== National championships ====
- 2012/2013 Polish SuperCup2012, with PGE Skra Bełchatów
- 2013/2014 Polish Championship, with PGE Skra Bełchatów
