= Nicolás Uriarte =

Argentine volleyball player (born 1990)

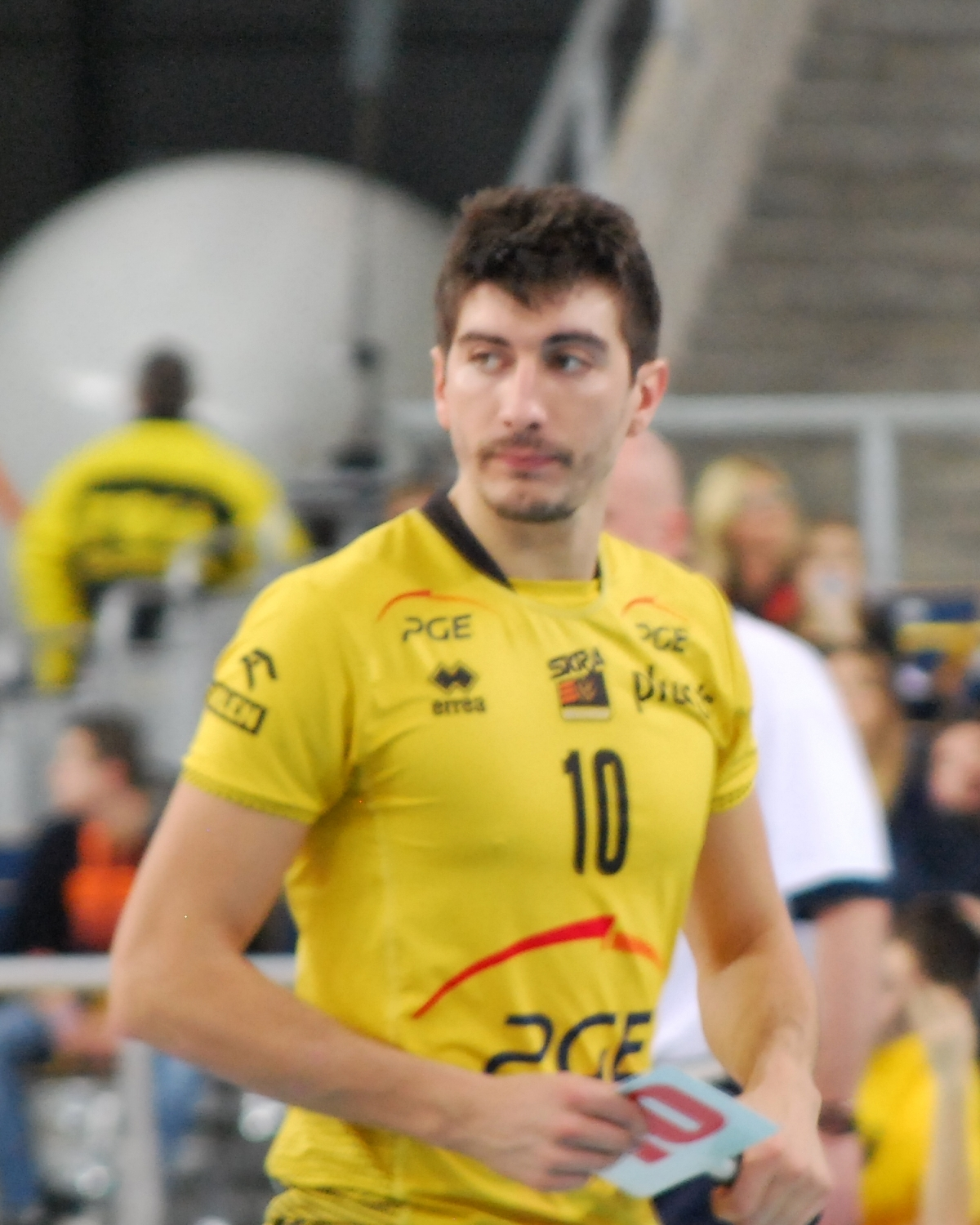

Personal information
- Nickname: El Sabroso
- Born: 21 March 1990 (age 36); Buenos Aires, Argentina
- Height: 1.89 m (6 ft 2 in)
- Weight: 87 kg (192 lb)
- Spike: 340 cm (134 in)
- Block: 320 cm (126 in)

Volleyball information
- Position: Setter
- Current club: Sada Cruzeiro
- Number: 5

Career
Years	Teams
2007–2008; 2008–2009; 2009–2010; 2010–2011; 2011–2012; 2012–2013; 2013–2017; 2017–2018; 2018–2019; 2019–2020; 2020–2022; 2022–	La Unión de Formosa; Mendoza Voley; Zinella Volley; M. Roma Volley; Boca Juniors; Buenos Aires Unidos; Skra Bełchatów; Sada Cruzeiro; Vôlei Taubaté; Bolívar Voley; Narbonne Volley; Sada Cruzeiro

National team
2009–2021	Argentina
Honours
Men's volleyball
Representing Argentina
Pan American Games
Gold medal – first place	2015 Toronto
Bronze medal – third place	2011 Guadalajara
CSV South American Championship
Silver medal – second place	2011 Brazil
Silver medal – second place	2013 Brazil

Nicolás Uriarte (born 21 March 1990) is an Argentine professional volleyball player. He was a member of the Argentina national team and a participant at the Olympic Games 2012 London. At the professional club level, he plays for Sada Cruzeiro.

== Personal life ==
Uriarte was born in Buenos Aires. His father, Jon Uriarte, is a former volleyball player, bronze medallist at the Olympic Games (1988 Seoul), and a previous head coach of the Australia men's national volleyball team.

== Career ==
=== Club ===
In 2013, he signed a contract with PGE Skra Bełchatów and won the Polish Champion title in 2014. On 8 October 2014, his team won the Polish SuperCup. In February 2015, he signed a next two–year contract with Skra until 2017. On 7 February 2016, he won the Polish Cup after beating ZAKSA in the final.

== Honours ==
=== Club ===
- CSV South American Club Championship
  - Montes Claros 2018 – with Sada Cruzeiro
  - Araguari 2023 – with Sada Cruzeiro
- CEV Challenge Cup
  - 2021–22 – with Narbonne Volley
- National championships
  - 2013–14 Polish Championship, with PGE Skra Bełchatów
  - 2014–15 Polish SuperCup, with PGE Skra Bełchatów
  - 2015–16 Polish Cup, with PGE Skra Bełchatów
  - 2017–18 Brazilian SuperCup, with Sada Cruzeiro
  - 2017–18 Brazilian Cup, with Sada Cruzeiro
  - 2017–18 Brazilian Championship, with Sada Cruzeiro
  - 2018–19 Brazilian Championship, with Vôlei Taubaté
  - 2022–23 Brazilian SuperCup, with Sada Cruzeiro
  - 2022–23 Brazilian Cup, with Sada Cruzeiro

=== Youth national team ===
- 2006 CSV U19 South American Championship

=== Individual awards ===
- 2007: FIVB U19 World Championship – Best setter
- 2013: CSV South American Club Championship – Best defender
- 2018: CSV South American Club Championship – Best setter
- 2022: CEV Challenge Cup – Most valuable player
