= Karol Kłos =

Polish volleyball player (born 1989)

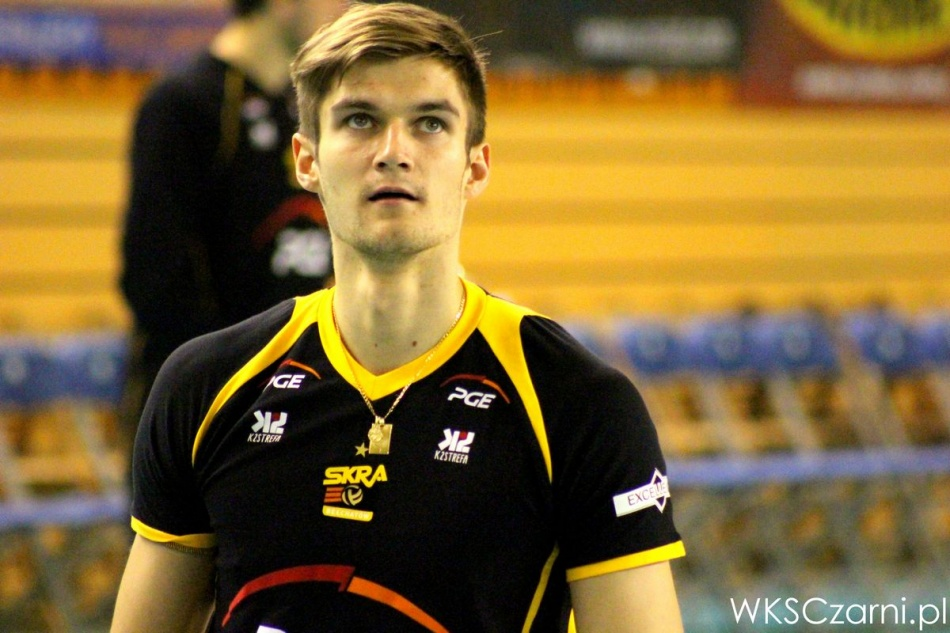
- Kłos in 2014

Personal information
- Born: 8 August 1989 (age 37); Warsaw, Poland
- Height: 2.01 m (6 ft 7 in)
- Weight: 87 kg (192 lb)
- Spike: 355 cm (140 in)
- Block: 340 cm (134 in)

Volleyball information
- Position: Middle blocker
- Current club: Projekt Warsaw
- Number: 6

Career
Years	Teams
2008–2010; 2010–2023; 2023–2025; 2025–	AZS Politechnika Warszawska; Skra Bełchatów; Asseco Resovia; Projekt Warsaw

National team
2009–2024	Poland
Honours
Men's volleyball
Representing Poland
FIVB World Championship
Gold medal – first place	2014 Poland
Silver medal – second place	2022 Poland/Slovenia
FIVB World Cup
Silver medal – second place	2019 Japan
Bronze medal – third place	2015 Japan
FIVB Nations League
Gold medal – first place	2023 Gdańsk
Silver medal – second place	2021 Rimini
Bronze medal – third place	2019 Chicago
Bronze medal – third place	2022 Bologna
Bronze medal – third place	2024 Łódź
FIVB World League
Bronze medal – third place	2011 Gdańsk
CEV European Championship
Gold medal – first place	2023 Italy/Bulgaria/North Macedonia/Israel
Bronze medal – third place	2011 Austria/Czech Republic
Bronze medal – third place	2019 Belgium/France/Netherlands/Slovenia

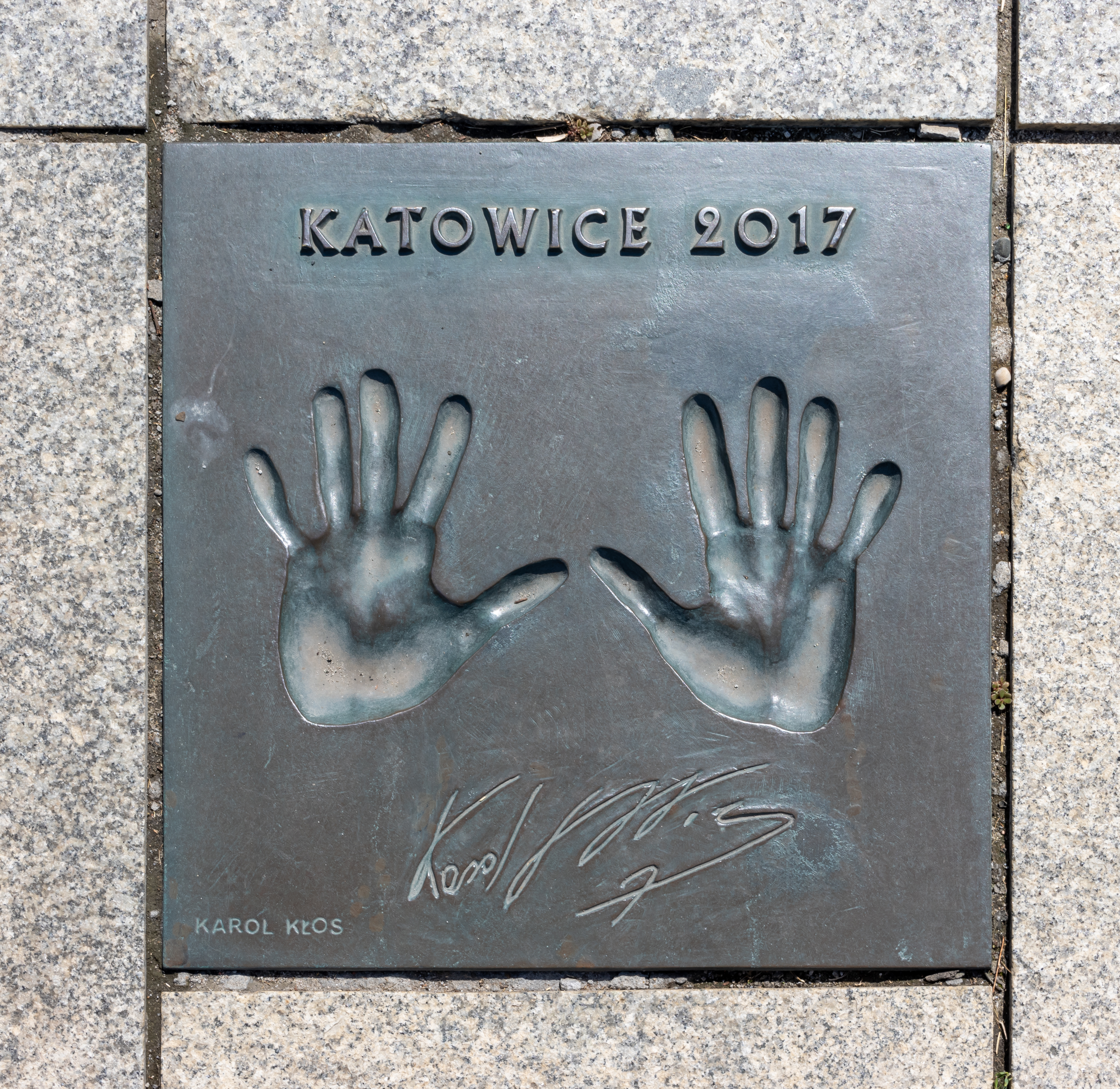
Hand prints and signature at the Avenue of Volleyball Stars, Katowice

Karol Kłos (born 8 August 1989) is a Polish professional volleyball player who plays as a middle blocker for Projekt Warsaw. He is a former member of the Poland national team, a participant in the Olympic Games Rio 2016 and the 2014 World Champion.

== Personal life ==
He is a graduate of the Miguel de Cervantes High School in Warsaw.

On 15 July 2017, he married Aleksandra Dudzicka. Their marriage ended in July 2024.

== Career ==
=== Club ===
Kłos moved to Skra Bełchatów in 2010. He signed a new contract with Skra towards the end of the 2014/2015 season. On 27 May 2014 his team won the Polish Championship after final matches against Asseco Resovia. That was his second national title. On 8 October 2014 his team won the Polish SuperCup. On 6 May 2015 he won a bronze medal of the Polish Championship.

In May 2015 he extended his contract with Skra Bełchatów until the end of the 2016/2017 season. On 7 February 2016 alongside PGE Skra he won the Polish Cup after beating ZAKSA in the final. In April 2016 he was a member of the same team which won a bronze medal of the Polish Championship.

=== National team ===
On 21 September 2014 he won a title of the 2014 World Champion and received an individual award for the Best Middle Blocker of the tournament. On 27 October 2014 Kłos received a state award granted by the Polish President Bronisław Komorowski – Gold Cross of Merit for outstanding sports achievements and worldwide promotion of Poland. In April 2015 he was announced as a new captain of the national team. Due to an injury, he did not take part in the intercontinental round of the 2015 World League and was replaced by Michał Kubiak.

== Honours ==
=== Club ===
- CEV Champions League
  - 2011–12 – with PGE Skra Bełchatów
- FIVB Club World Championship
  - Doha 2010 – with PGE Skra Bełchatów
- CEV Cup
  - 2023–24 – with Asseco Resovia
  - 2024–25 – with Asseco Resovia
- Domestic
  - 2010–11 Polish Cup, with PGE Skra Bełchatów
  - 2010–11 Polish Championship, with PGE Skra Bełchatów
  - 2011–12 Polish Cup, with PGE Skra Bełchatów
  - 2012–13 Polish SuperCup, with PGE Skra Bełchatów
  - 2013–14 Polish Championship, with PGE Skra Bełchatów
  - 2014–15 Polish SuperCup, with PGE Skra Bełchatów
  - 2015–16 Polish Cup, with PGE Skra Bełchatów
  - 2017–18 Polish SuperCup, with PGE Skra Bełchatów
  - 2017–18 Polish Championship, with PGE Skra Bełchatów
  - 2018–19 Polish SuperCup, with PGE Skra Bełchatów

=== Youth national team ===
- 2007 CEV U19 European Championship

=== Universiade ===
- 2013 Summer Universiade

=== Individual awards ===
- 2014: FIVB World Championship – Best middle blocker

=== State awards ===
- 2014: Gold Cross of Merit

=== Statistics ===
- 2021–22 PlusLiga – Best blocker (97 blocks)
