= Hala Energia =

Coordinates: 51.3637°N 19.3771°E

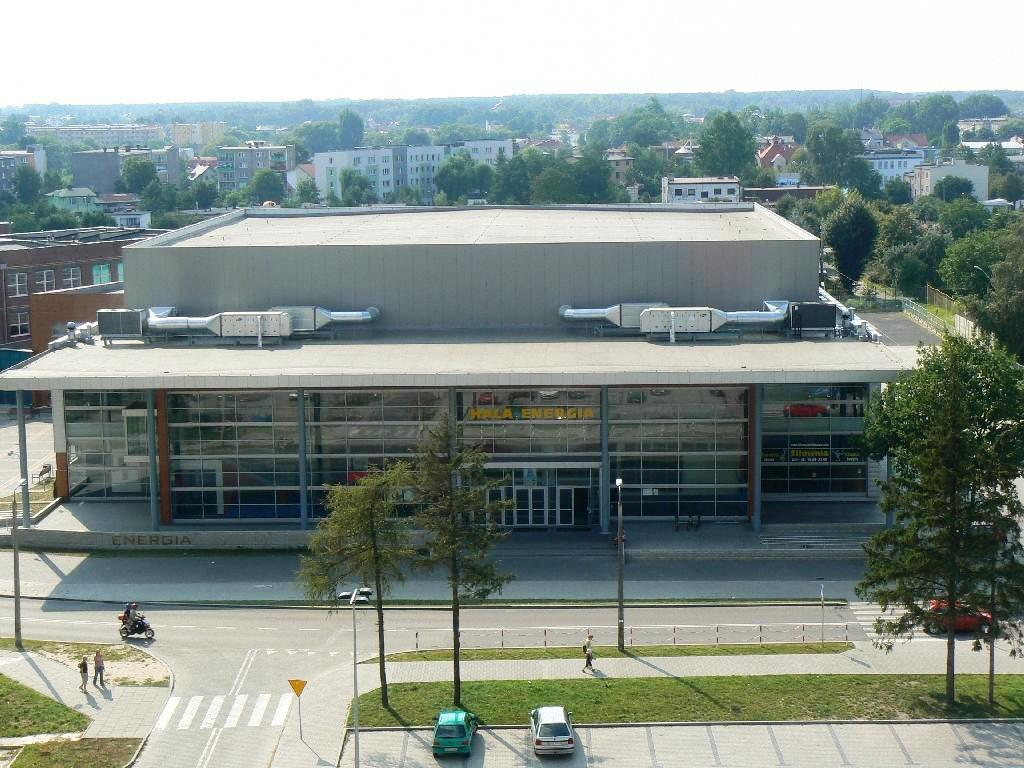
- Interactive map of Hala Energia
- Full name: Hala Energia im. Edwarda Najgebauera
- Location: ul. Dąbrowskiego 11a 97–400 Bełchatów
- Capacity: 2,700 (volleyball)

Tenant
- PGE Skra Bełchatów

Hala Energia is an indoor arena in Bełchatów, Poland.

Skra Bełchatów has played its matches here since 14 August 2006. The hall is connected to the Gymnasium No. 1 in Bełchatów. The building is divided into three sectors, which allows simultaneous use of the hall by the volleyball team and local students.
