= KPS Kielce =

Polish volleyball club

- Full name: Klub Piłki Siatkowej Kielce
- Founded: 2007
- Dissolved: 2019
- Ground: Hala Legionów ul. Leszka Drogosza 2; 25–093 Kielce (Capacity: 4,200)

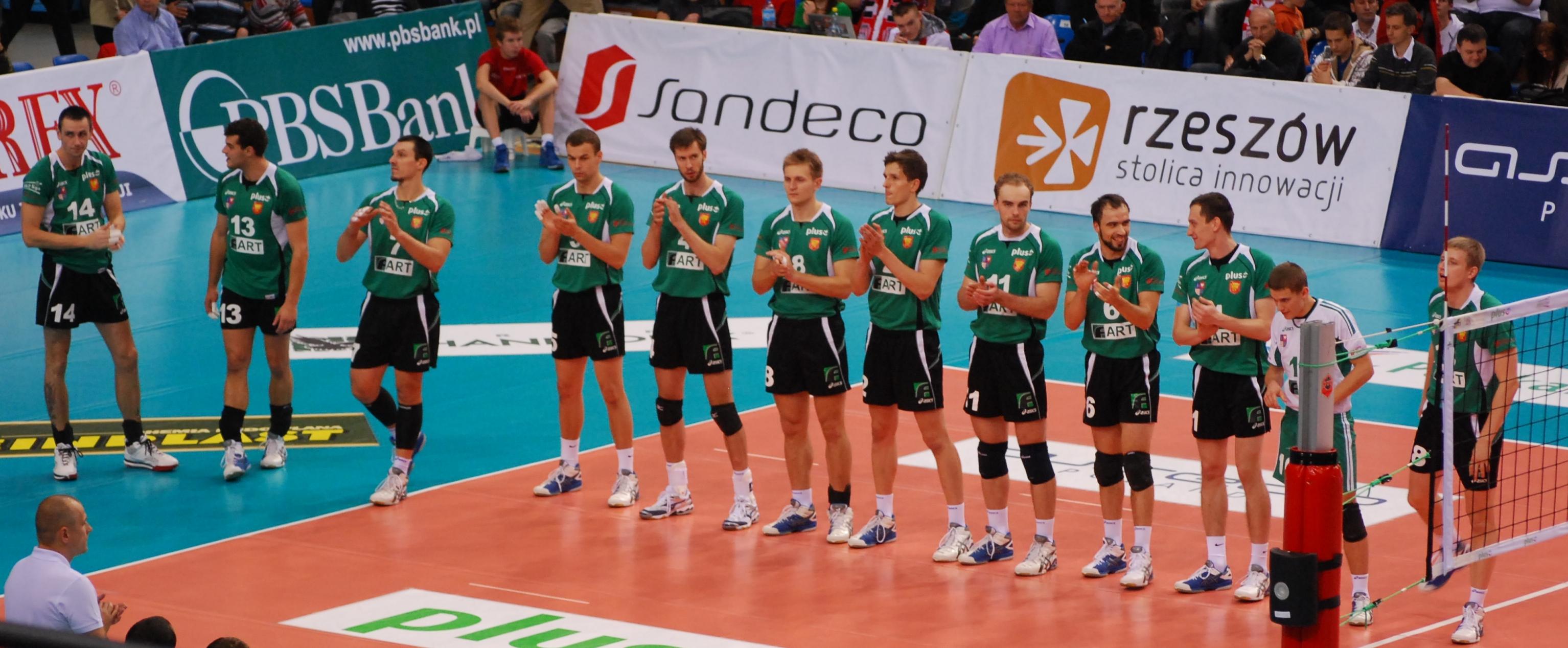

KPS Kielce – was a professional men's volleyball club based in Kielce in southeastern Poland, founded in 2007 under the name Fart Kielce. From 2010 to 2018, they competed in the Polish PlusLiga. The club was dissolved in 2019.

== Former names ==
Years	Name
2007–2012	Fart Kielce
2012–2017	Effector Kielce
2017–2018	Dafi Społem Kielce
2018	KPS Kielce
2018–2019	Buskowianka Kielce
