= 2009–10 PGE Skra Bełchatów season =

PGE Skra Bełchatów
2009–10 season
- Chairman: Konrad Piechocki
- Manager: Jacek Nawrocki
- Polish Championship: (6th title)

PGE Skra Bełchatów 2009–2010 season is the 2009/2010 volleyball season for Polish professional volleyball club PGE Skra Bełchatów. The club won 6th title of Polish Champion, bronze medal of CEV Champions League and silver medal of FIVB Club World Championship.

The club competed in:

- Polish Championship
- Polish Cup
- CEV Champions League
- FIVB Club World Championship

== Team roster ==
Head coach:	Jacek Nawrocki
Assistant:	Maciej Bartodziejski

No.	Name	Date of birth	Position
1	(Poland) Maciej Dobrowolski	March 19, 1977	setter
2	(Poland) Mariusz Wlazły (C)	August 4, 1983	opposite
3	(Poland) Piotr Gacek	September 16, 1978	libero
4	(Poland) Daniel Pliński	December 10, 1978	middle blocker
5	(Czech Republic) Jakub Novotný	April 20, 1979	opposite
6	(Poland) Miłosz Hebda	March 11, 1991	opposite
7	(Poland) Bartosz Kurek	August 29, 1988	outside hitter
8	(Poland) Filip Frankowski	May 7, 1990	outside hitter
10	(Spain) Miguel Angel Falasca	April 29, 1973	setter
11	(France) Stéphane Antiga	February 3, 1976	outside hitter
12	(Poland) Radosław Kolanek	July 21, 1986	middle blocker
13	(Poland) Michał Winiarski	September 28, 1983	outside hitter
14	(Poland) Radosław Wnuk	September 25, 1978	middle blocker
15	(Poland) Igor Walczykowski	June 21, 1990	opposite
16	(Poland) Bartosz Cedzyński	December 20, 1990	opposite
17	(Poland) Marcin Możdżonek	February 9, 1985	middle blocker
18	(Poland) Michał Bąkiewicz	February 22, 1983	outside hitter

== Squad changes for the 2010–2011 season ==
In:

No.	Player	Position	From
5	(Czech Republic) Jakub Novotný	opposite	ZAKSA Kędzierzyn-Koźle
6	(Poland) Miłosz Hebda	opposite
8	(Poland) Filip Frankowski	outside hitter
13	(Poland) Michał Winiarski	outside hitter	Itas Diatec Trentino
15	(Poland) Igor Walczykiewicz	opposite
16	(Poland) Bartosz Cedzyński	opposite

Out:

No.	Player	Position	To
5	(Finland) Janne Heikkinen	middle blocker	retirement
6	(Poland) Dawid Murek	outside hitter	AZS Częstochowa
8	(Poland) Jakub Jarosz	opposite	ZAKSA Kędzierzyn-Koźle
9	(Poland) Paweł Maciejewicz	outside hitter
