= Andrzej Wrona =

Polish volleyball player

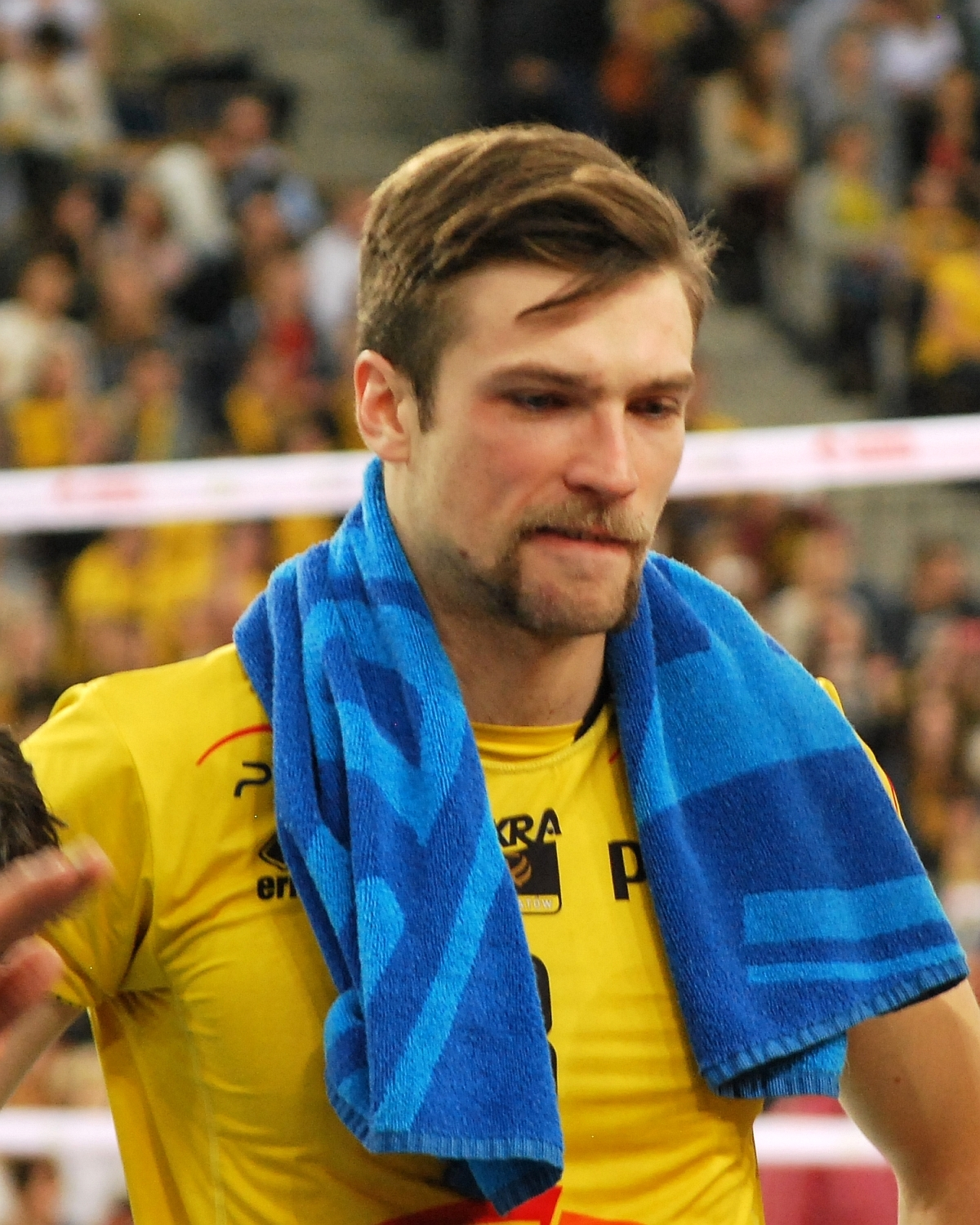
- Wrona in 2014

Personal information
- Full name: Andrzej Zdzisław Wrona
- Nickname: Wronka
- Born: 27 December 1988 (age 37); Warsaw, Poland
- Height: 2.06 m (6 ft 9 in)

Volleyball information
- Position: Middle blocker

Career
Years	Teams
2007–2010; 2010–2013; 2013–2016; 2016–2025	AZS Częstochowa; Delecta Bydgoszcz; Skra Bełchatów; Projekt Warsaw

National team
2013–2019	Poland (38)
Honours
Men's volleyball
Representing Poland
FIVB World Championship
Gold medal – first place	2014 Poland
FIVB Nations League
Bronze medal – third place	2019 Chicago

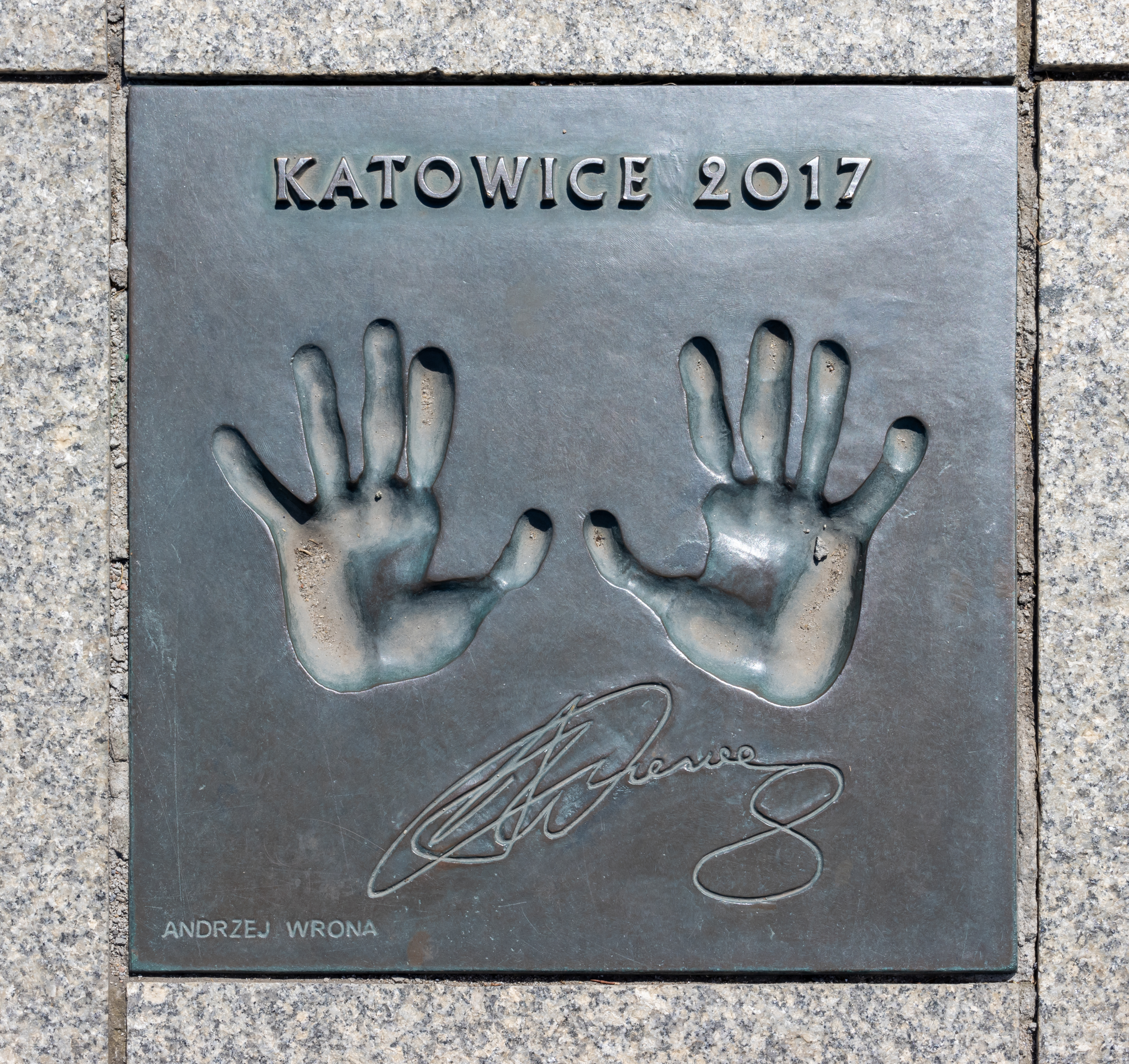
Hand prints and signature at the Avenue of Volleyball Stars, Katowice

Andrzej Zdzisław Wrona (born 27 December 1988) is a Polish former professional volleyball player. He is a former member of the Poland national team and the 2014 World Champion.

== Career ==
=== Club ===
He debuted in PlusLiga in the 2007/2008 season, when he played for Wkręt-Met Domex AZS Częstochowa. With this club, he won a silver medal at the Polish Championship and Polish Cup in 2007/2008. In the next three seasons, he played for Delecta Bydgoszcz, where he was the primary player. His high level of play was the reason that he moved to one of the top Polish clubs, PGE Skra Bełchatów in 2013. He won a title of Polish Champion 2014 with PGE Skra Bełchatów. On October 8, 2014 his team won Polish SuperCup. On 6 May 2015, he won the 2014–15 PlusLiga bronze medal. In May 2015, he extended the contract with PGE Skra Bełchatów until the end of the 2016–17 season. On 7 February 2016, Wrona won the 2016 Polish Cup after beating ZAKSA in the final.

=== National team ===
Wrona was called up to the national team by Andrea Anastasi in 2012, and made his debut in a friendly match against Serbia. On 21 September 2014, Poland won their second World Champions title. On 27 October 2014, he was awarded the Gold Cross of Merit by the President of Poland Bronisław Komorowski – for outstanding sports achievements and worldwide promotion of Poland.

== Honours ==
=== Club ===
- CEV Challenge Cup
  - 2023–24 – with Projekt Warsaw
- Domestic
  - 2007–08 Polish Cup, with AZS Częstochowa
  - 2013–14 Polish Championship, with PGE Skra Bełchatów
  - 2014–15 Polish SuperCup, with PGE Skra Bełchatów
  - 2015–16 Polish Cup, with PGE Skra Bełchatów

=== State awards ===
- 2014: Gold Cross of Merit

=== Statistics ===
- 2011–12 PlusLiga – Best blocker (78 blocks)
- 2012–13 PlusLiga – Best blocker (75 blocks)
- 2018–19 PlusLiga – Best blocker (81 blocks)
