= Michał Bąkiewicz =

Polish volleyball player and coach

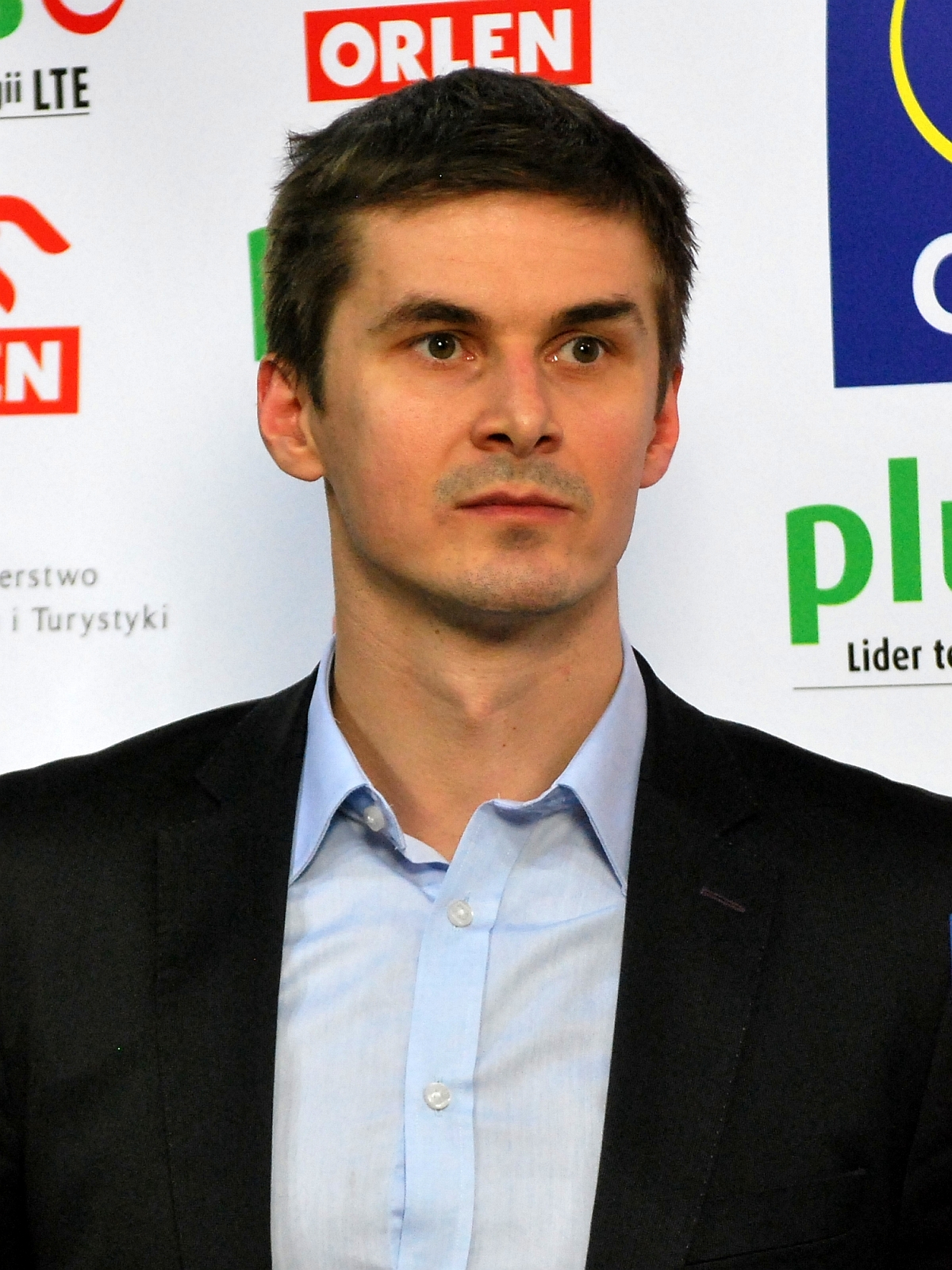

Personal information
- Full name: Michał Bogusław Bąkiewicz
- Nickname: Bąku
- Born: 22 March 1981 (age 45); Piotrków Trybunalski, Poland
- Height: 1.97 m (6 ft 6 in)

Coaching information
Previous teams coached
Years	Teams
2014–2017; 2017–2022; 2022–2025	AZS Częstochowa; SMS PZPS Spała; Skra Bełchatów (AC)

Volleyball information
- Position: Outside hitter

Career
Years	Teams
2000–2003; 2003–2004; 2004–2007; 2007–2013; 2013–2014	AZS Częstochowa; Skra Bełchatów; AZS Olsztyn; Skra Bełchatów; AZS Częstochowa

National team
2001–2011	Poland (205)
Honours
Men's volleyball
Representing Poland
FIVB World Championship
Silver medal – second place	2006 Japan
FIVB World League
Bronze medal – third place	2011 Gdańsk
CEV European Championship
Gold medal – first place	2009 Turkey

Michał Bogusław Bąkiewicz (born 22 March 1981) is a Polish former professional volleyball player and coach. He is a former member of the Poland national team, a participant in the Olympic Games Athens 2004, a silver medallist at the 2006 World Championship and the 2009 European Champion. He serves as chairman of PGE Skra Bełchatów.

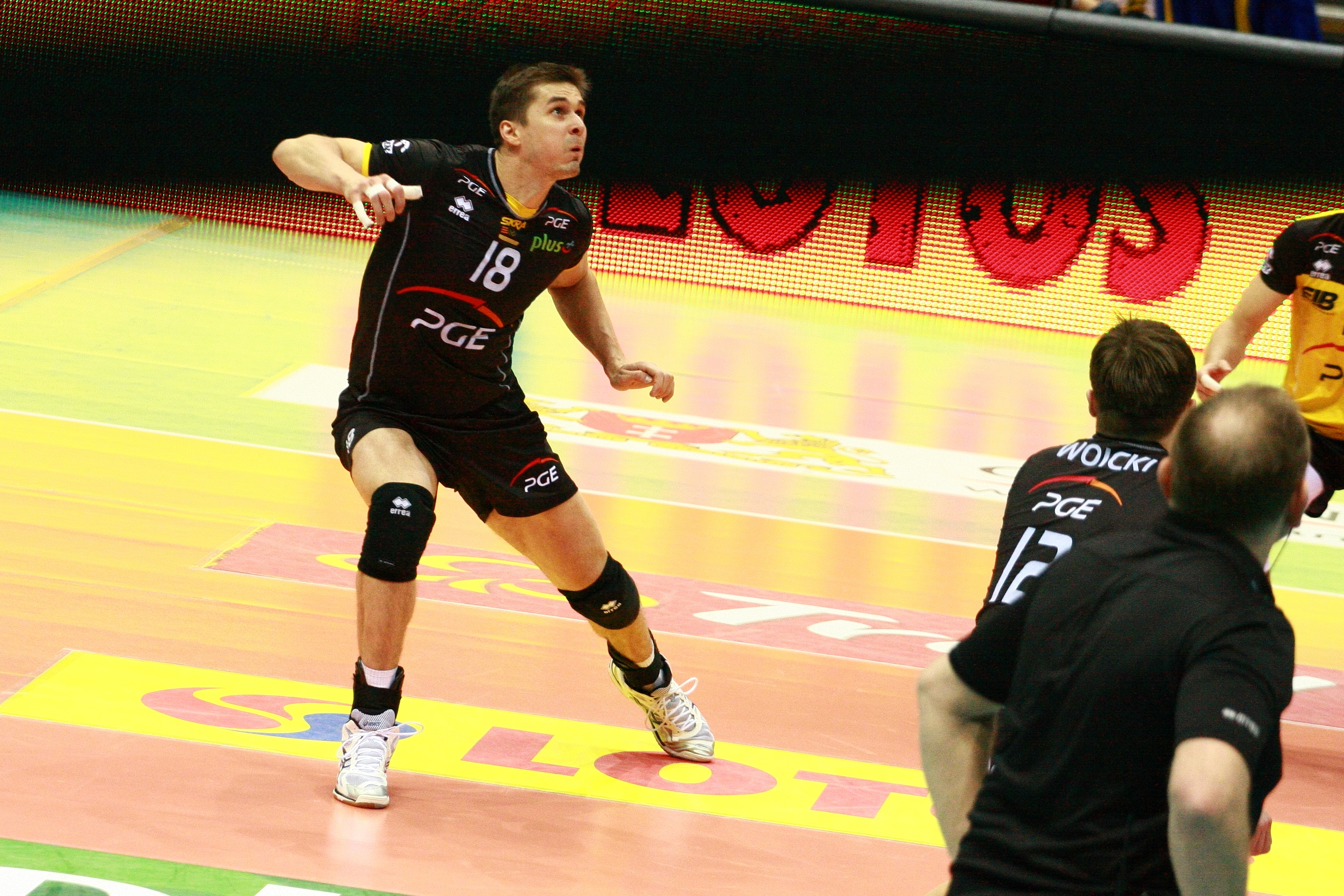
As a player of PGE Skra Bełchatów during the PlusLiga match against Lotos Trefl Gdańsk.

== Career ==
=== Club ===
In 2013, after six seasons spent in PGE Skra Bełchatów, he moved to AZS Częstochowa. In early December 2014, he decided to end his career and officially joined the coaching staff of AZS Częstochowa.

=== National team ===
Bąkiewicz was a member of the Polish national volleyball team that won a silver medal at the 2006 World Championship. In 2009, he won a title of the European Champion. On 14 September 2009, he was awarded the Knight's Cross of Polonia Restituta. The Order was conferred on the following day by the Prime Minister of Poland of that time, Donald Tusk.

== Honours ==
=== As a player ===
- CEV Champions League
  - 2011–12 – with PGE Skra Bełchatów
- FIVB Club World Championship
  - Doha 2009 – with PGE Skra Bełchatów
  - Doha 2010 – with PGE Skra Bełchatów
- Domestic
  - 2007–08 Polish Championship, with PGE Skra Bełchatów
  - 2008–09 Polish Cup, with PGE Skra Bełchatów
  - 2008–09 Polish Championship, with PGE Skra Bełchatów
  - 2009–10 Polish Championship, with PGE Skra Bełchatów
  - 2010–11 Polish Cup, with PGE Skra Bełchatów
  - 2010–11 Polish Championship, with PGE Skra Bełchatów
  - 2011–12 Polish SuperCup, with PGE Skra Bełchatów
  - 2011–12 Polish Cup, with PGE Skra Bełchatów

=== As a coach ===
- 2021 FIVB U19 World Championship, with Poland U19

=== State awards ===
- 2006: Gold Cross of Merit
- 2009: Knight's Cross of Polonia Restituta
