= Jacek Nawrocki =

Polish volleyball coach

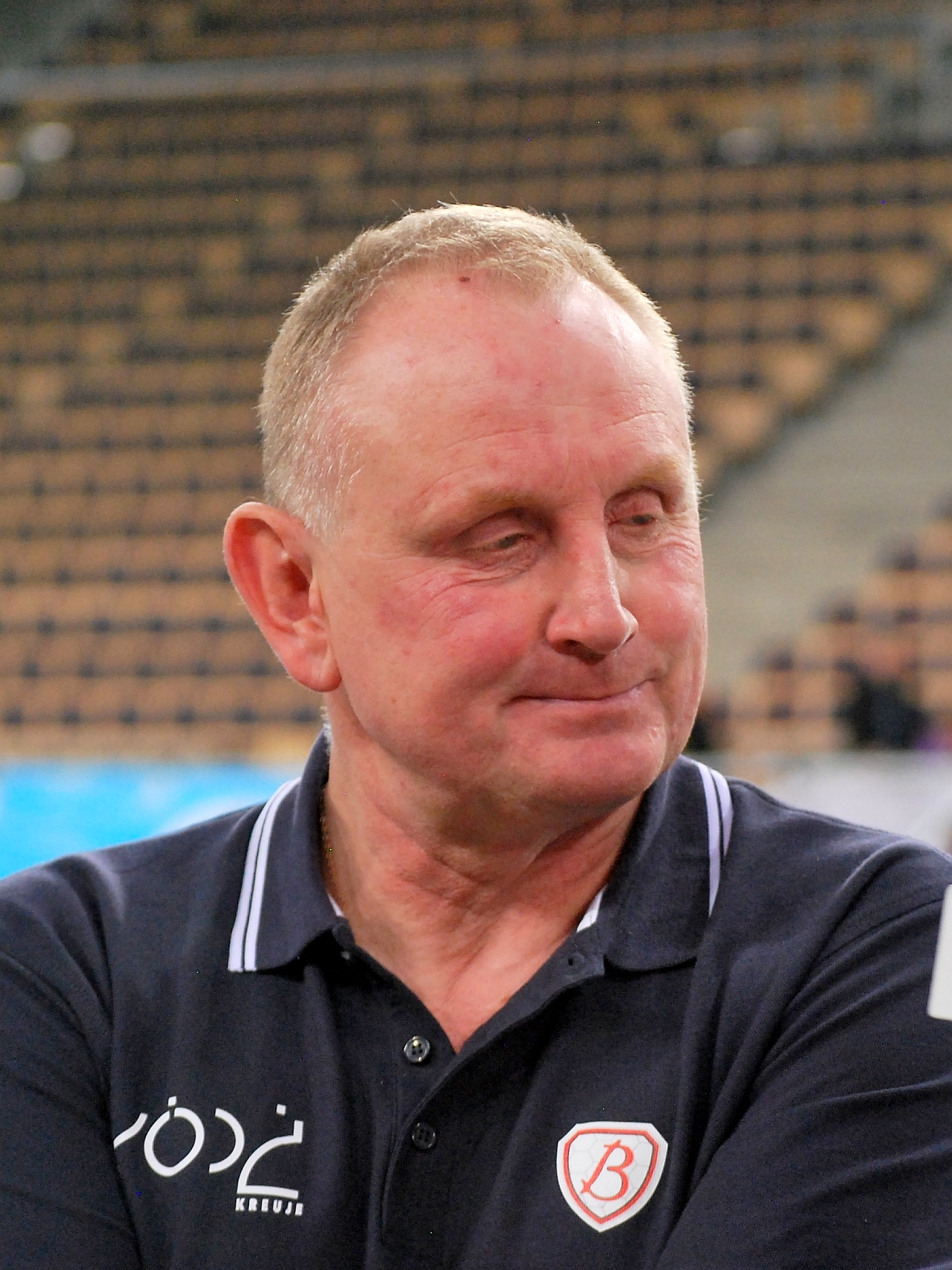

Personal information
- Born: 20 August 1965 (age 61); Tomaszów Mazowiecki, Poland

Coaching information
- Current team: SMS PZPS Spała
Previous teams coached
Years	Teams
2001–2009; 2009–2013; 2013–2015; 2015–2021; 2021–2022; 2022; 2023–	Skra Bełchatów (AC); Skra Bełchatów; SMS PZPS Spała; Poland (W); Chemik Police; Czarni Radom; SMS PZPS Spała

Volleyball information
- Position: Setter
Honours
Women's volleyball
Head coach Poland
European Games
Silver medal – second place	2015 Baku

Jacek Nawrocki (born 20 August 1965) is a Polish professional volleyball coach and former player.

== Personal life ==
Nawrocki was born in Tomaszów Mazowiecki. His brother Stanisław Nawrocki is a physicist. He is married to Agnieszka and has two children – son Bartłomiej and daughter Aleksandra.

== Career as coach ==
From 2009 to 2013, he was the head coach of PGE Skra Bełchatów. He led the team to two titles of the Polish Champions, two Polish Cups, one Polish SuperCup, medals of CEV Champions League (bronze in 2010, silver in 2012), medals of Club World Championship (silver in 2009 and 2010, bronze in 2012). In 2013, he was replaced by Miguel Ángel Falasca.

From 2013 to 2015, he served as an assistant coach for the Poland national U19 team.

In April 2015, he was announced as the new head coach of the Poland women's national volleyball team.

== Honours ==
=== Club ===
- CEV Champions League
  - 2011–12 – with PGE Skra Bełchatów
- FIVB Club World Championship
  - Doha 2009 – with PGE Skra Bełchatów
  - Doha 2010 – with PGE Skra Bełchatów
- Domestic
  - 2009–10 Polish Championship, with PGE Skra Bełchatów
  - 2010–11 Polish Cup, with PGE Skra Bełchatów
  - 2010–11 Polish Championship, with PGE Skra Bełchatów
  - 2011–12 Polish Cup, with PGE Skra Bełchatów
  - 2012–13 Polish SuperCup, with PGE Skra Bełchatów

=== Youth national team ===
- 2014 CEV U20 European Championship, with Poland U20
- 2025 FIVB U19 World Championship, with Poland U19
- 2026 CEV U18 European Championship, with Poland U18

Sporting positions
Preceded by (Poland) Piotr Makowski	Head coach of Poland (W); 2015–2021	Succeeded by (Italy) Stefano Lavarini
