= Miguel Ángel Falasca =

Spanish volleyball player and coach (1973–2019)

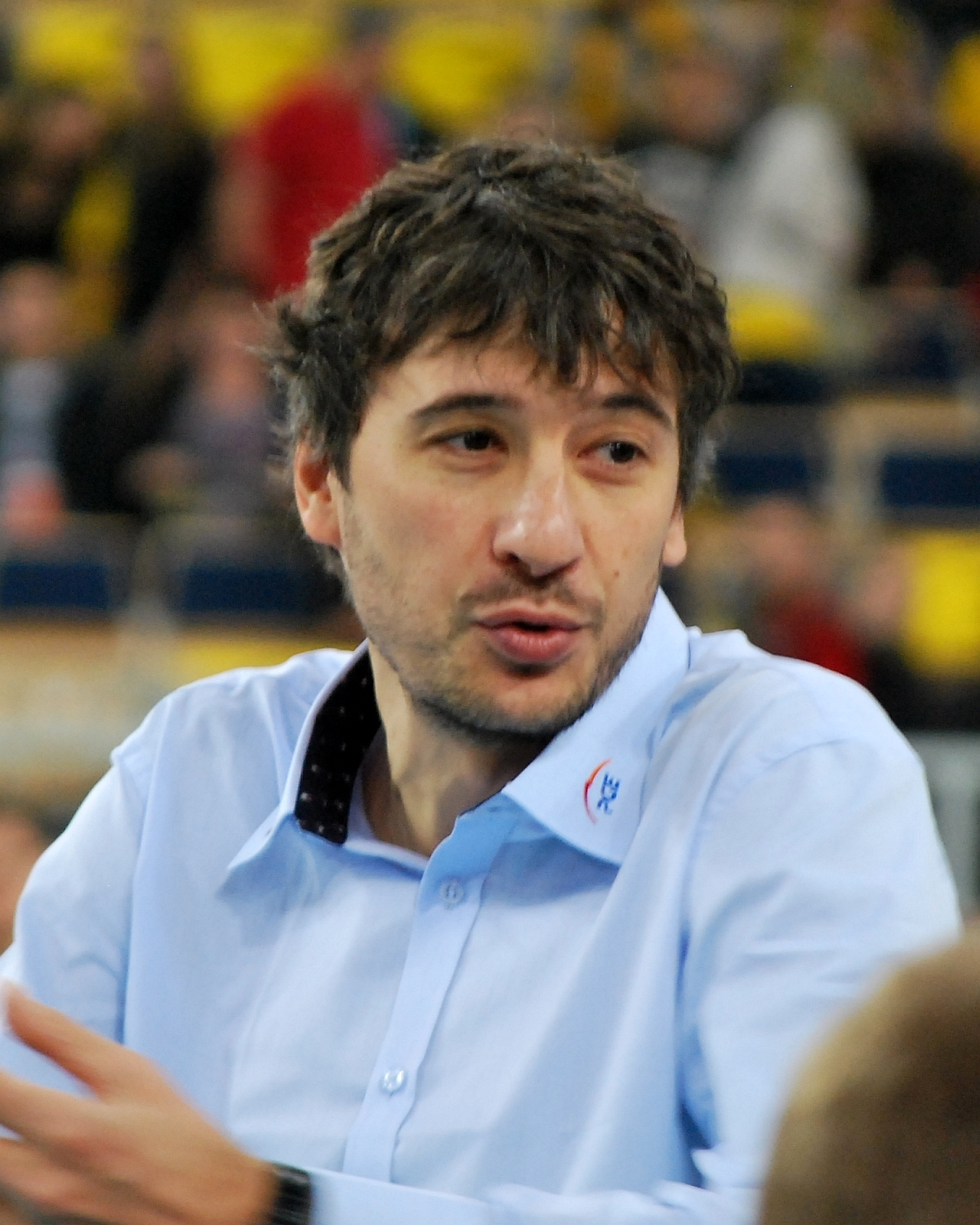
- Falasca in January 2014

Personal information
- Full name: Miguel Ángel Falasca Fernández
- Nationality: Spanish
- Born: 29 April 1973; Mendoza, Argentina
- Died: 22 June 2019 (aged 46); Monza, Italy
- Height: 1.94 m (6 ft 4 in)

Coaching information
Previous teams coached
Years	Teams
2013–2016; 2016–2017; 2016–2018; 2018–2019	Skra Bełchatów; Czech Republic; Volley Milano; Saugella Monza

Volleyball information
- Position: Setter

Career
Years	Teams
1996–1997; 1997–1998; 1998–2000; 2000–2002; 2002–2003; 2003–2008; 2008–2012; 2012–2013	CV Las Palmas; Zinella Volley; Del Monte Ferrara; Knack Roeselare; Modena Volley; CV Pòrtol; Skra Bełchatów; Ural Ufa

National team
1993–2009	Spain (371)
Honours
Men's volleyball
Representing Spain
CEV European Championship
Gold medal – first place	2007 Russia
European League
Gold medal – first place	2007 Portugal
Silver medal – second place	2009 Portugal
Bronze medal – third place	2005 Russia
Mediterranean Games
Silver medal – second place	2009 Pescara

Miguel Ángel Falasca Fernández (29 April 1973 – 22 June 2019) was a Spanish professional volleyball player and coach born in Argentina. He was a member of the Spain national team from 1993 to 2009, a participant in the Olympic Games Sydney 2000, and the 2007 European Champion.

== Personal life ==
Falasca was born in Mendoza, Argentina. His grandfather came from Italy. His father, Juan Carlos, was a retired volleyball player from Argentina, and his mother was a native Spaniard. At the age of 15, due to the unstable economic situation in Argentina, the Falasca family decided to move to Spain. Miguel, his sister María Elisa, his younger brother Guillermo, and his parents settled in Málaga. He eventually married Esther Custodio. They had two children: a daughter, Sara (born 2004), and a son, Daniel (born 2002).

=== Death ===
On 21 June 2019, Falasca was at the wedding of his friend and assistant of the Saugella Monza club in Italy, when he felt ill and went to his hotel room. He died of a heart attack the next day at the age of 46 in Varese, where he was staying with his wife, despite a resuscitation attempt.

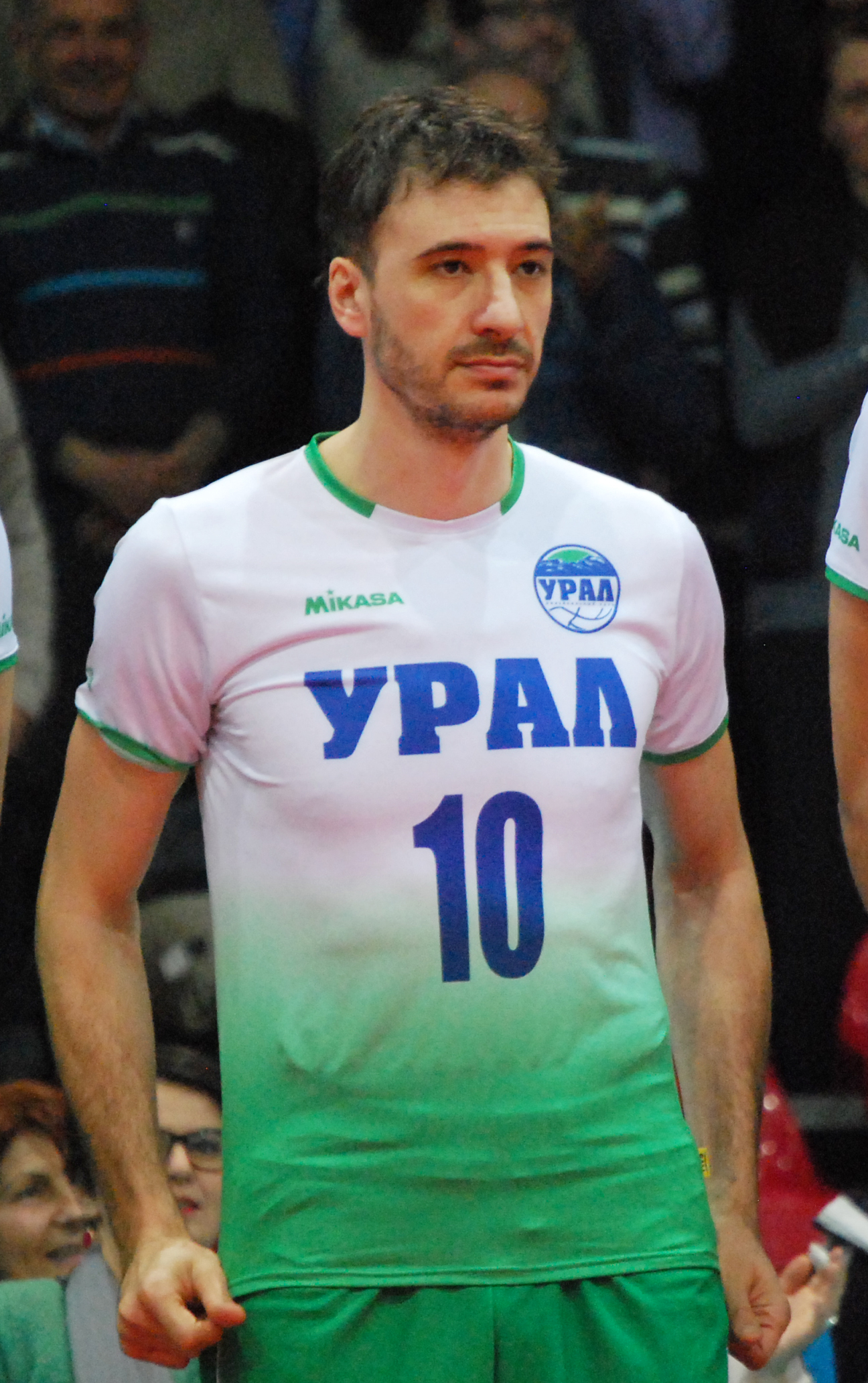
Falasca during the medal ceremony of the Russian Championship in 2013, as Ural Ufa player.

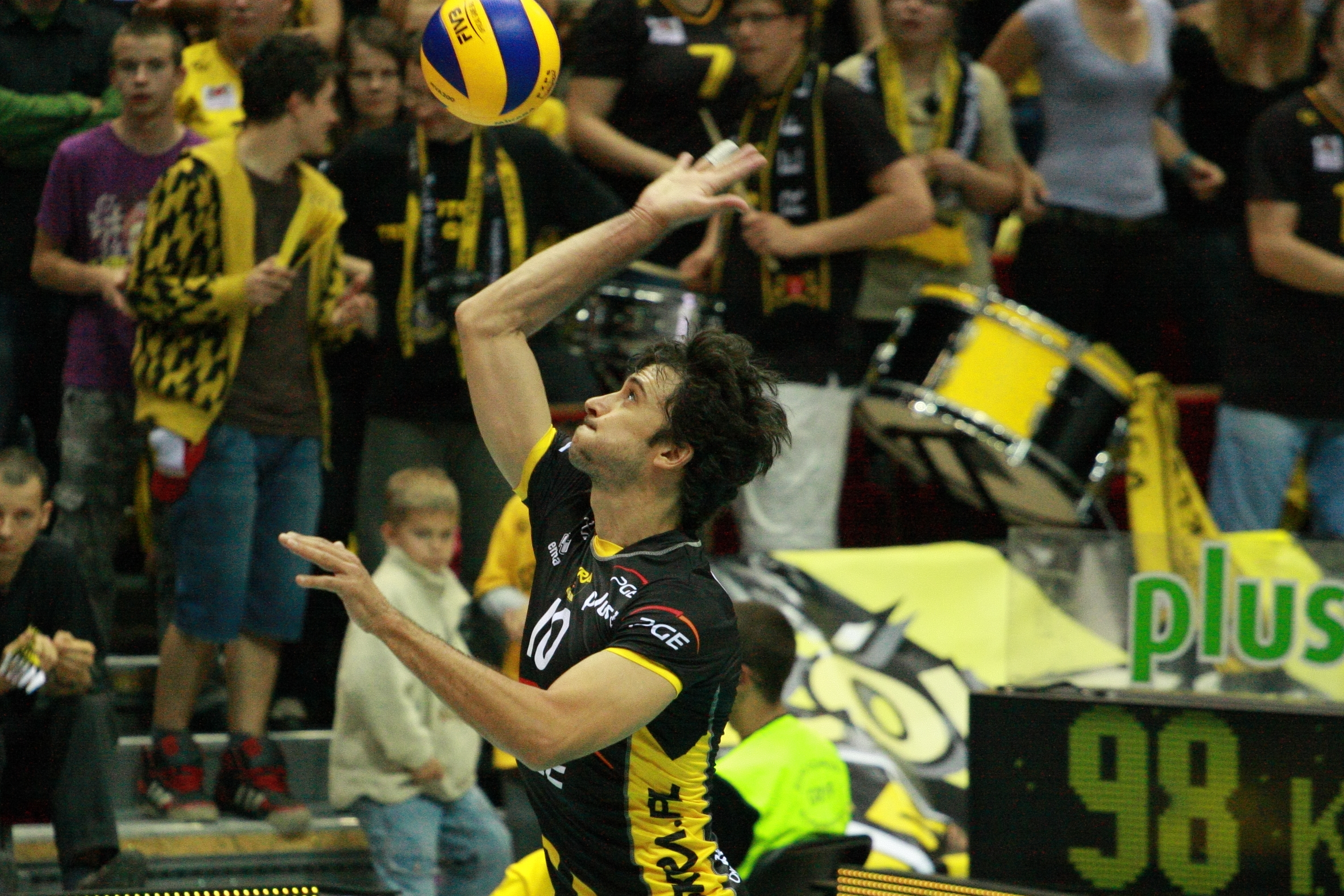
Miguel Ángel Falasca as PGE Skra Bełchatów player in 2011.

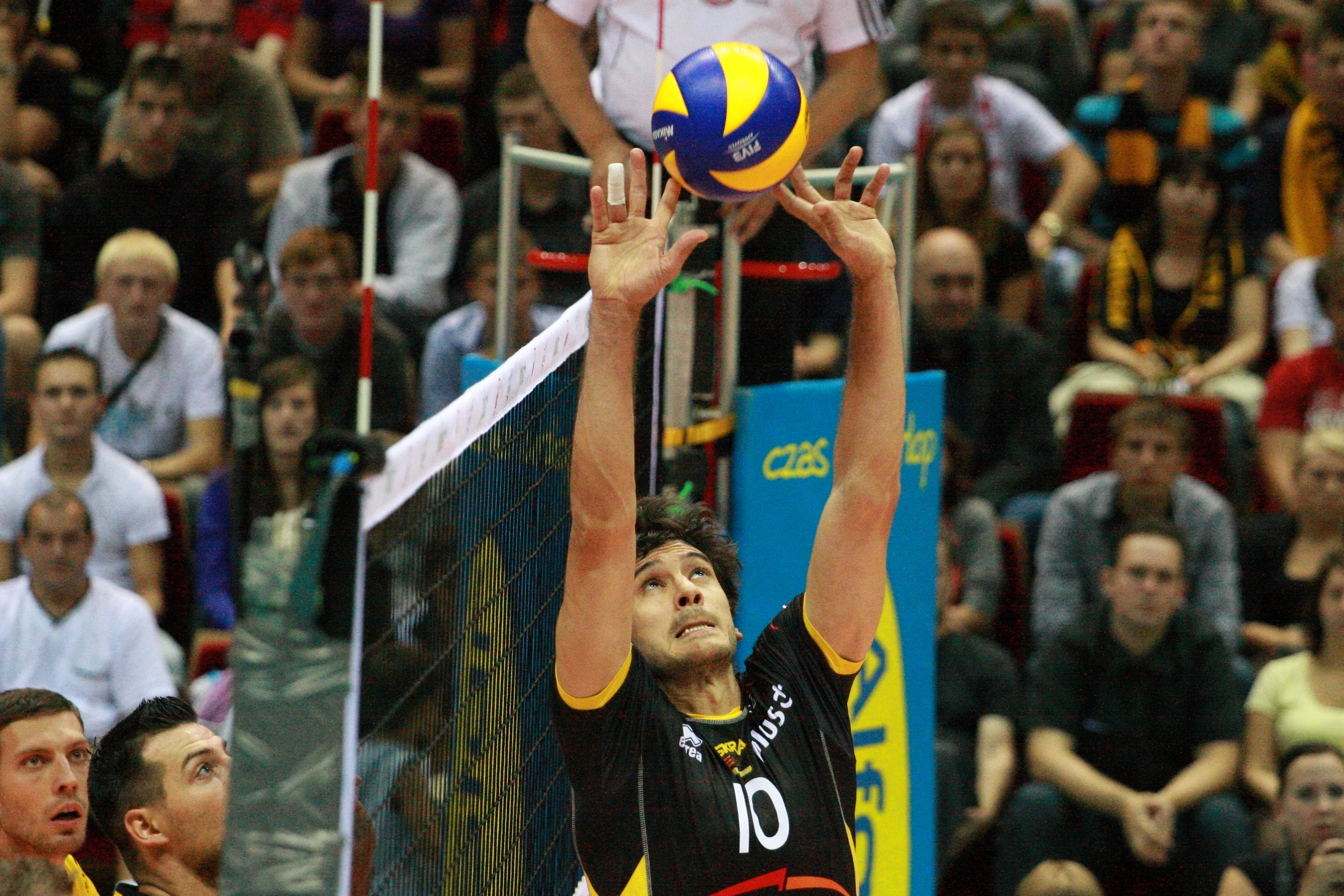
On 30 September 2011 during the match PGE Skra Bełchatów – LOTOS Trefl Gdańsk at Ergo Arena.

== Career as coach ==
Falasca began coaching with PGE Skra Bełchatów in 2013. In the first season of his work, PGE Skra won a title of Polish Champion 2013-14. It was the eighth title of Polish Champion in the club's history. On 1 July 2014, the club extended the contract with him until 2017. In February 2016, he became the head coach of the Czech Republic men's national volleyball team. In March 2016, PGE Skra Bełchatów, led by Falasca, lost the second match with Zenit Kazan in playoffs 6 of CEV Champions League (the first match Skra won 3–2). Following this loss, Falasca was dismissed during the subsequent club meeting, with an announcement on 28 March 2016. In May 2016, he signed a two-year contract with Italian club Gi Group Monza.

== Honours ==
=== As a player ===
- CEV Champions League
  - 2002–03 – with Kerakoll Modena
  - 2011–12 – with PGE Skra Bełchatów
- FIVB Club World Championship
  - Doha 2009 – with PGE Skra Bełchatów
  - Doha 2010 – with PGE Skra Bełchatów
- CEV Cup
  - 2001–02 – with Knack Roeselare
  - 2005–06 – with Portol Palma de Mallorca
- CEV Challenge Cup
  - 2004–05 – with Son Amar Palma de Mallorca
  - 2012–13 – with Ural Ufa
- Domestic
  - 1996–97 Spanish Cup, with CV Las Palmas
  - 2000–01 Belgian SuperCup, with Knack Roeselare
  - 2004–05 Spanish Cup, with Portol Palma de Mallorca
  - 2005–06 Spanish Cup, with Portol Palma de Mallorca
  - 2005–06 Spanish Championship, with Portol Palma de Mallorca
  - 2006–07 Spanish Championship, with Portol Palma de Mallorca
  - 2007–08 Spanish Championship, with Portol Palma de Mallorca
  - 2008–09 Polish Cup, with PGE Skra Bełchatów
  - 2008–09 Polish Championship, with PGE Skra Bełchatów
  - 2009–10 Polish Championship, with PGE Skra Bełchatów
  - 2010–11 Polish Cup, with PGE Skra Bełchatów
  - 2010–11 Polish Championship, with PGE Skra Bełchatów
  - 2011–12 Polish Cup, with PGE Skra Bełchatów
- Universiade
  - 1995 Summer Universiade

=== As a coach ===
- CEV Challenge Cup
  - 2018–19 – with Saugella Monza
- Domestic
  - 2013–14 Polish SuperCup, with PGE Skra Bełchatów
  - 2013–14 Polish Championship, with PGE Skra Bełchatów
  - 2015–16 Polish Cup, with PGE Skra Bełchatów

=== Individual awards ===
- 2007: FIVB World Cup – Best setter
- 2009: Polish Cup – Best server
- 2009: European League – Best setter
- 2012: Polish Cup – Most valuable player
- 2012: Polish Cup – Best setter

Awards
Preceded by (Serbia and Montenegro) Nikola Grbić	Best Setter of FIVB World Cup; 2007	Succeeded by (Argentina) Luciano De Cecco
Preceded by (Netherlands) Yannick van Harskamp	Best Setter of European League; 2009	Succeeded by (Spain) Guillermo Hérnan
