= 2012–13 PlusLiga =

- League: PlusLiga
- Sport: Volleyball
- Duration: 6 October 2012 – 21 April 2013
- Teams: 10
- TV partner: Polsat Sport
- League champions: Asseco Resovia (6th title)

Seasons
- 2011–12 2013–14

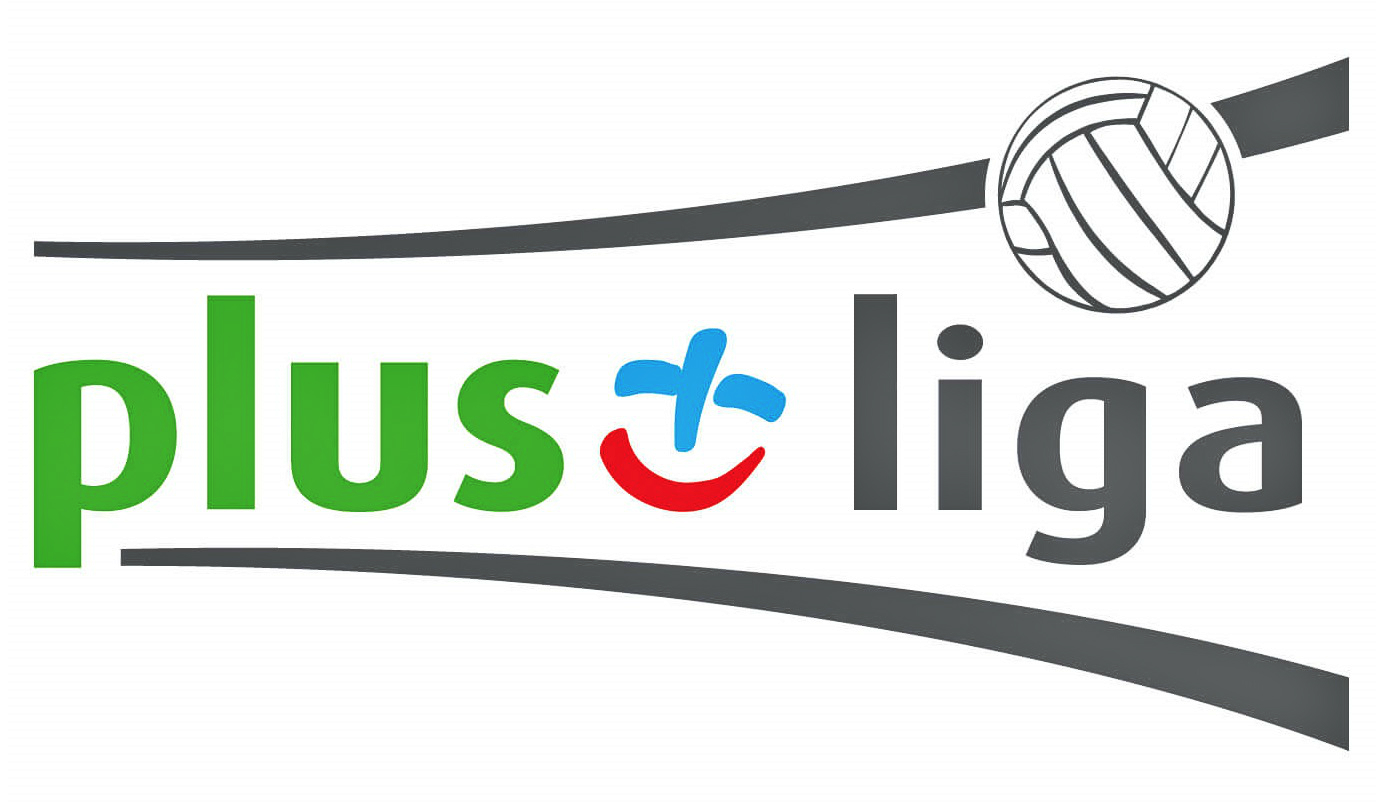
PlusLiga logo

The 2012–13 PlusLiga was the 77th season of the Polish Volleyball Championship, the 13th season as a professional league organized by the Professional Volleyball League SA (Polish: Profesjonalna Liga Piłki Siatkowej SA) under the supervision of the Polish Volleyball Federation (Polish: Polski Związek Piłki Siatkowej).

Asseco Resovia won their 6th title of the Polish Champions.

== Regular season ==
Pos	Team	Pld	W	L	Pts	SW	SL	SR	SPW	SPL	SPR	Qualification
1	Delecta Bydgoszcz	18	14	4	41	45	22	2.045	1574	1425	1.105	Playoffs
2	Jastrzębski Węgiel	18	13	5	37	42	24	1.750	1511	1400	1.079	Playoffs
3	ZAKSA Kędzierzyn-Koźle	18	12	6	37	45	27	1.667	1662	1536	1.082	Playoffs
4	Asseco Resovia	18	12	6	35	42	26	1.615	1565	1456	1.075	Playoffs
5	PGE Skra Bełchatów	18	10	8	33	41	31	1.323	1638	1565	1.047	Playoffs
6	AZS Politechnika Warszawska	18	8	10	27	35	36	0.972	1545	1585	0.975	Playoffs
7	Effector Kielce	18	8	10	20	31	40	0.775	1531	1606	0.953	Playoffs
8	Lotos Trefl Gdańsk	18	6	12	17	23	44	0.523	1450	1563	0.928	Playoffs
9	Indykpol AZS Olsztyn	18	5	13	15	23	44	0.523	1486	1589	0.935	
10	Wkręt–met AZS Częstochowa	18	2	16	8	19	52	0.365	1418	1655	0.857	

Source: PlusLiga

== Playoffs ==
Quarterfinals
1	Delecta Bydgoszcz	3
8	Lotos Trefl Gdańsk	0
5	PGE Skra Bełchatów	2
4	Asseco Resovia	3
3	ZAKSA Kędzierzyn-Koźle	3
6	AZS Politechnika Warszawska	0
7	Effector Kielce	2
2	Jastrzębski Węgiel	3

Semifinals
1	Delecta Bydgoszcz	1
4	Asseco Resovia	3
3	ZAKSA Kędzierzyn-Koźle	3
2	Jastrzębski Węgiel	1

Finals
1	Asseco Resovia	3
3	ZAKSA Kędzierzyn-Koźle	2

=== 1st round ===
==== Quarterfinals ====
- (to 3 victories)

Date	Time		Score		Set 1	Set 2	Set 3	Set 4	Set 5	Total	Report
16 Feb	17:00	Delecta Bydgoszcz	3–0	Lotos Trefl Gdańsk	25–22	27–25	25–13			77–60	
18 Feb	18:00	Delecta Bydgoszcz	3–0	Lotos Trefl Gdańsk	26–24	25–21	25–15			76–60	
20 Feb	19:00	Lotos Trefl Gdańsk	0–3	Delecta Bydgoszcz	20–25	18–25	22–25			60–75	

Date	Time		Score		Set 1	Set 2	Set 3	Set 4	Set 5	Total	Report
17 Feb	14:30	Asseco Resovia	3–1	PGE Skra Bełchatów	18–25	25–20	25–14	25–18		93–77	
18 Feb	18:00	Asseco Resovia	3–2	PGE Skra Bełchatów	25–27	25–23	25–22	17–25	16–14	108–111	
24 Feb	14:30	PGE Skra Bełchatów	3–2	Asseco Resovia	21–25	23–25	25–16	25–20	15–13	109–99	
25 Feb	18:00	PGE Skra Bełchatów	3–1	Asseco Resovia	25–17	25–27	25–23	25–21		100–88	
4 Mar	18:00	Asseco Resovia	3–2	PGE Skra Bełchatów	25–23	25–20	21–25	15–25	15–12	101–105	

Date	Time		Score		Set 1	Set 2	Set 3	Set 4	Set 5	Total	Report
16 Feb	14:30	ZAKSA Kędzierzyn-Koźle	3–0	AZS Politechnika Warszawska	25–21	25–20	25–18			75–59	
17 Feb	19:00	ZAKSA Kędzierzyn-Koźle	3–2	AZS Politechnika Warszawska	25–19	26–28	23–25	25–21	15–13	114–106	
23 Feb	14:00	AZS Politechnika Warszawska	0–3	ZAKSA Kędzierzyn-Koźle	23–25	16–25	17–25			56–75	

Date	Time		Score		Set 1	Set 2	Set 3	Set 4	Set 5	Total	Report
15 Feb	18:00	Jastrzębski Węgiel	3–0	Effector Kielce	25–20	25–17	25–21			75–58	
16 Feb	17:00	Jastrzębski Węgiel	3–1	Effector Kielce	25–23	25–16	24–26	25–20		99–85	
24 Feb	18:00	Effector Kielce	3–2	Jastrzębski Węgiel	25–23	13–25	23–25	25–21	15–12	101–106	
25 Feb	18:00	Effector Kielce	3–0	Jastrzębski Węgiel	25–22	25–21	25–18			75–61	
3 Mar	19:00	Jastrzębski Węgiel	3–0	Effector Kielce	25–19	25–22	25–18			75–59	

=== 2nd round ===
==== Semifinals ====
- (to 3 victories)

Date	Time		Score		Set 1	Set 2	Set 3	Set 4	Set 5	Total	Report
10 Mar	20:00	Delecta Bydgoszcz	3–2	Asseco Resovia	27–25	21–25	25–19	20–25	15–13	108–107	
11 Mar	18:00	Delecta Bydgoszcz	1–3	Asseco Resovia	22–25	25–18	24–26	23–25		94–94	
24 Mar	14:30	Asseco Resovia	3–1	Delecta Bydgoszcz	20–25	25–19	25–21	25–23		95–88	
25 Mar	18:00	Asseco Resovia	3–1	Delecta Bydgoszcz	21–25	25–21	30–28	26–24		102–98	

Date	Time		Score		Set 1	Set 2	Set 3	Set 4	Set 5	Total	Report
8 Mar	20:00	Jastrzębski Węgiel	3–0	ZAKSA Kędzierzyn-Koźle	27–25	28–26	25–15			80–66	
23 Mar	14:30	Jastrzębski Węgiel	1–3	ZAKSA Kędzierzyn-Koźle	25–15	23–25	22–25	20–25		90–90	
28 Mar	20:00	ZAKSA Kędzierzyn-Koźle	3–2	Jastrzębski Węgiel	18–25	23–25	25–21	25–19	15–6	106–96	
29 Mar	18:00	ZAKSA Kędzierzyn-Koźle	3–1	Jastrzębski Węgiel	25–19	21–25	25–20	25–13		96–77	

==== 5th–8th places ====
- (to 2 victories)

Date	Time		Score		Set 1	Set 2	Set 3	Set 4	Set 5	Total	Report
8 Mar	18:00	Effector Kielce	0–3	AZS Politechnika Warszawska	33–35	17–25	20–25			70–85	
16 Mar	17:00	AZS Politechnika Warszawska	3–1	Effector Kielce	25–14	23–25	25–20	25–23		98–82	

Date	Time		Score		Set 1	Set 2	Set 3	Set 4	Set 5	Total	Report
10 Mar	15:00	PGE Skra Bełchatów	3–0	Lotos Trefl Gdańsk	25–22	25–19	25–21			75–62	
17 Mar	20:30	Lotos Trefl Gdańsk	0–3	PGE Skra Bełchatów	14–25	19–25	19–25			52–75	

=== 3rd round ===
==== 9th place ====
- (to 3 victories)

Date	Time		Score		Set 1	Set 2	Set 3	Set 4	Set 5	Total	Report
2 Mar	17:00	Indykpol AZS Olsztyn	1–3	AZS Częstochowa	23–25	25–23	14–25	23–25		85–98	
8 Mar	18:30	AZS Częstochowa	3–1	Indykpol AZS Olsztyn	25–21	20–25	25–19	28–26		98–91	
15 Mar	18:00	Indykpol AZS Olsztyn	0–3	AZS Częstochowa	15–25	22–25	19–25			56–75	

==== 5th place ====
- (to 3 victories)

Date	Time		Score		Set 1	Set 2	Set 3	Set 4	Set 5	Total	Report
22 Mar	18:00	PGE Skra Bełchatów	3–2	AZS Politechnika Warszawska	22–25	25–14	23–25	25–18	15–7	110–89	
23 Mar	16:00	PGE Skra Bełchatów	3–1	AZS Politechnika Warszawska	25–22	24–26	32–30	25–17		106–95	
8 Apr	19:00	AZS Politechnika Warszawska	2–3	PGE Skra Bełchatów	25–18	25–23	17–25	17–25	13–15	97–106	

==== 3rd place ====
- (to 3 victories)

Date	Time		Score		Set 1	Set 2	Set 3	Set 4	Set 5	Total	Report
8 Apr	18:00	Delecta Bydgoszcz	3–1	Jastrzębski Węgiel	25–27	26–24	25–21	25–16		101–88	
9 Apr	18:00	Delecta Bydgoszcz	2–3	Jastrzębski Węgiel	20–25	25–23	25–14	22–25	11–15	103–102	
15 Apr	18:00	Jastrzębski Węgiel	3–2	Delecta Bydgoszcz	19–25	25–19	25–17	27–29	15–12	111–102	
16 Apr	18:00	Jastrzębski Węgiel	3–0	Delecta Bydgoszcz	25–17	25–17	25–14			75–48	

==== Finals ====
- (to 3 victories)

Date	Time		Score		Set 1	Set 2	Set 3	Set 4	Set 5	Total	Report
7 Apr	16:30	ZAKSA Kędzierzyn-Koźle	3–0	Asseco Resovia	28–26	25–20	25–23			78–69	
8 Apr	18:00	ZAKSA Kędzierzyn-Koźle	1–3	Asseco Resovia	23–25	25–19	22–25	23–25		93–94	
13 Apr	13:00	Asseco Resovia	3–0	ZAKSA Kędzierzyn-Koźle	25–20	25–22	25–20			75–62	
14 Apr	20:00	Asseco Resovia	0–3	ZAKSA Kędzierzyn-Koźle	19–25	28–30	23–25			70–80	
20 Apr	18:00	ZAKSA Kędzierzyn-Koźle	1–3	Asseco Resovia	26–28	25–14	17–25	19–25		87–92	

== Final standings ==
Qualified for the 2013–14 CEV Champions League
Qualified for the 2013–14 CEV Cup
Qualified for the 2013–14 CEV Challenge Cup

Rank	Team
1st place, gold medalist(s)	Asseco Resovia
2nd place, silver medalist(s)	ZAKSA Kędzierzyn-Koźle
3rd place, bronze medalist(s)	Jastrzębski Węgiel
4	Delecta Bydgoszcz
5	PGE Skra Bełchatów
6	AZS Politechnika Warszawska
7	Effector Kielce
8	Lotos Trefl Gdańsk
9	AZS Częstochowa
10	Indykpol AZS Olsztyn

2013 Polish Champions

6th title
