= Projekt Warsaw =

Polish volleyball club

PGE Projekt Warsaw
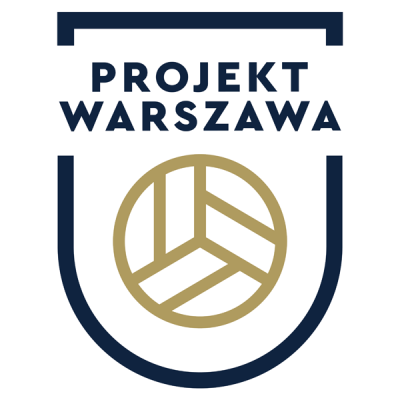
- Founded: 1954
- Ground: Arena COS Torwar (Capacity: 5,804)
- Chairman: Piotr Gacek
- Manager: Roberto Piazza
- Captain: Damian Wojtaszek
- League: Tauron Liga
- 2025–26: 3rd place
- Website: Club home page

Uniforms
Home	Away

Projekt Warsaw, officially known as PGE Projekt Warszawa, is a professional men's volleyball club based in Warsaw in central Poland. They compete in Tauron Liga, the top flight of Polish volleyball.

The club started as the volleyball section of the Academic Sports Association at the Warsaw University of Technology (AZS Politechnika Warszawska) in 1954. In 2005 it was transferred into a separate limited liability company and it has used various sponsor names since then. In 2017 the AZS Politechnika Warszawska name was abandoned in favour of the sponsor name Orico Warszawa. Since 2019 the club's main name has been Projekt Warszawa.

== Honours ==
=== Domestic ===
- Polish Championship

Silver (1): 2018–19

=== International ===
- CEV Champions League

Final Four (1): 2025–26

- CEV Challenge Cup

Winners (1): 2023–24
Silver (1): 2011–12

== Team ==
As of 2026–27 season

No.	Name	Date of birth	Position
5	(Poland) Jan Firlej	26 September 1996 (age 30)	setter
6	(Poland) Karol Kłos	8 August 1989 (age 37)	middle blocker
7	(France) Kévin Tillie	2 November 1990 (age 35)	outside hitter
9	(Ukraine) Yurii Semeniuk	12 May 1994 (age 32)	middle blocker
10	(Poland) Bartosz Bednorz	25 July 1994 (age 32)	outside hitter
11	(Poland) Aleksander Śliwka	24 May 1995 (age 31)	outside hitter
14	(Poland) Maciej Olenderek	16 October 1992 (age 34)	libero
15	(Poland) Bartosz Gomułka	30 May 2002 (age 24)	opposite
16	(Italy) Yuri Romanò	26 July 1997 (age 29)	opposite
17	(Canada) Brandon Koppers	9 September 1995 (age 31)	outside hitter
18	(Poland) Damian Wojtaszek	7 September 1988 (age 38)	libero
77	(Poland) Bartłomiej Lemański	19 March 1996 (age 30)	middle blocker
85	(Poland) Michał Kozłowski	16 February 1985 (age 41)	setter
99	(Poland) Jakub Strulak	12 May 2001 (age 25)	middle blocker
Head coach:		(Italy) Roberto Piazza	

== Season by season ==
Season	Tier	League	Pos.
2008–09	1	PlusLiga	8
2009–10	1	PlusLiga	10
2010–11	1	PlusLiga	5
2011–12	1	PlusLiga	8
2012–13	1	PlusLiga	6
2013–14	1	PlusLiga	6
2014–15	1	PlusLiga	8
2015–16	1	PlusLiga	8
2016–17	1	PlusLiga	9

Season	Tier	League	Pos.
2017–18	1	PlusLiga	8
2018–19	1	PlusLiga	2
2019–20	1	PlusLiga	2
2020–21	1	PlusLiga	3
2021–22	1	PlusLiga	9
2022–23	1	PlusLiga	5
2023–24	1	PlusLiga	3
2024–25	1	PlusLiga	3
2025–26	1	PlusLiga	3

=== Former names ===
Verva Warszawa Orlen Paliwa

Years	Name
1954–2005	KU AZS Politechnika Warszawska
2005–2006	Wózki BT AZS Politechnika Warszawska
2006–2007	J.W. Construction AZS Politechnika Warszawska
2007–2009	J.W. Construction Osram AZS Politechnika Warszawska
2009–2010	Neckermann AZS Politechnika Warszawska
2010–2014	AZS Politechnika Warszawska
2014	4You Airlines AZS Politechnika Warszawska
2014–2016	AZS Politechnika Warszawska
2016–2017	Onico AZS Politechnika Warszawska
2017–2019	Onico Warszawa
2019	Projekt Warszawa
2019–2021	Verva Warszawa Orlen Paliwa
2021–2024	Projekt Warszawa
2024–present	PGE Projekt Warszawa

== See also ==
- Projekt Warsaw players
- Projekt Warsaw coaches
