= 2011–12 PlusLiga =

- League: PlusLiga
- Sport: Volleyball
- Duration: 29 September 2011 – 25 April 2012
- Teams: 10
- TV partner: Polsat Sport
- League champions: Asseco Resovia (5th title)

Seasons
- 2010–11 2012–13

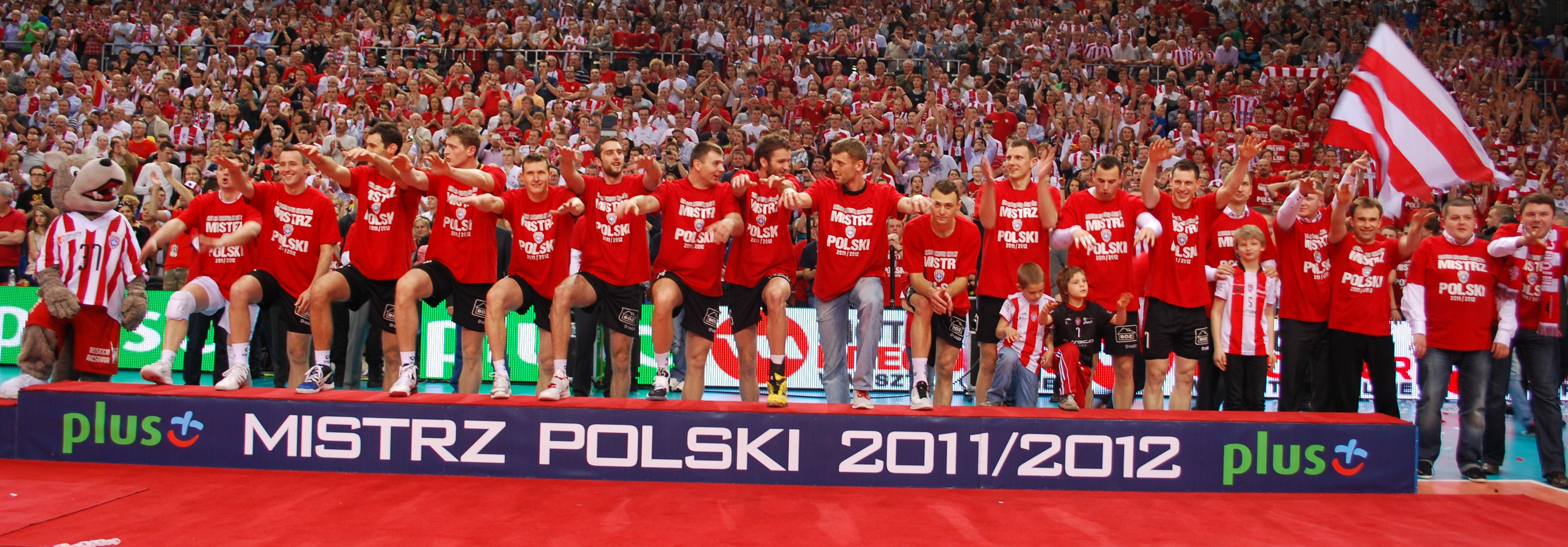
Asseco Resovia, the winners of the championship

The 2011–12 PlusLiga was the 76th season of the Polish Volleyball Championship, the 12th season as a professional league organized by the Professional Volleyball League SA (Polish: Profesjonalna Liga Piłki Siatkowej SA) under the supervision of the Polish Volleyball Federation (Polish: Polski Związek Piłki Siatkowej).

Asseco Resovia won their 5th title of the Polish Champions, the first title since 1975.

== Regular season ==
Pos	Team	Pld	W	L	Pts	SW	SL	SR	SPW	SPL	SPR	Qualification
1	PGE Skra Bełchatów	18	16	2	46	50	18	2.778	1642	1431	1.147	Playoffs
2	ZAKSA Kędzierzyn-Koźle	18	13	5	39	45	21	2.143	1587	1492	1.064	Playoffs
3	Asseco Resovia	18	13	5	38	43	22	1.955	1530	1389	1.102	Playoffs
4	Delecta Bydgoszcz	18	11	7	31	71	40	1.775	1586	1523	1.041	Playoffs
5	Jastrzębski Węgiel	18	10	8	29	37	34	1.088	1593	1581	1.008	Playoffs
6	Tytan AZS Częstochowa	18	7	11	23	27	39	0.692	1499	1567	0.957	Playoffs
7	Fart Kielce	18	6	12	21	30	41	0.732	1575	1621	0.972	Playoffs
8	AZS Politechnika Warszawska	18	6	12	19	31	44	0.705	1592	1679	0.948	Playoffs
9	Indykpol AZS Olsztyn	18	4	14	13	20	45	0.444	1344	1547	0.869	
10	Lotos Trefl Gdańsk	18	4	14	11	17	45	0.378	1341	1459	0.919	

Source: PlusLiga

== Playoffs ==
Quarterfinals
1	PGE Skra Bełchatów	3
8	AZS Politechnika Warszawska	0
5	Jastrzębski Węgiel	3
4	Delecta Bydgoszcz	1
3	Asseco Resovia	3
6	Tytan AZS Częstochowa	0
7	Fart Kielce	0
2	ZAKSA Kędzierzyn-Koźle	3

Semifinals
1	PGE Skra Bełchatów	3
5	Jastrzębski Węgiel	0
3	Asseco Resovia	3
2	ZAKSA Kędzierzyn-Koźle	1

Finals
1	PGE Skra Bełchatów	1
3	Asseco Resovia	3

=== 1st round ===
==== Quarterfinals ====
- (to 3 victories)

Date	Time		Score		Set 1	Set 2	Set 3	Set 4	Set 5	Total	Report
10 Mar	14:30	PGE Skra Bełchatów	3–0	AZS Politechnika Warszawska	25–23	25–21	25–21			75–65	
11 Mar	14:30	PGE Skra Bełchatów	3–0	AZS Politechnika Warszawska	25–21	25–21	25–17			75–59	
21 Mar	18:00	AZS Politechnika Warszawska	0–3	PGE Skra Bełchatów	14–25	16–25	23–25			53–75	

Date	Time		Score		Set 1	Set 2	Set 3	Set 4	Set 5	Total	Report
11 Mar	14:00	Delecta Bydgoszcz	3–0	Jastrzębski Węgiel	25–22	25–18	25–22			75–62	
12 Mar	18:00	Delecta Bydgoszcz	2–3	Jastrzębski Węgiel	25–23	25–22	15–25	23–25	9–15	97–110	
21 Mar	18:00	Jastrzębski Węgiel	3–2	Delecta Bydgoszcz	26–28	22–25	25–20	26–24	16–14	115–111	
22 Mar	18:00	Jastrzębski Węgiel	3–1	Delecta Bydgoszcz	25–23	21–25	25–20	25–18		96–86	

Date	Time		Score		Set 1	Set 2	Set 3	Set 4	Set 5	Total	Report
9 Mar	18:00	Asseco Resovia	3–1	Tytan AZS Częstochowa	25–22	25–21	22–25	25–16		97–84	
10 Mar	17:00	Asseco Resovia	3–1	Tytan AZS Częstochowa	25–22	19–25	25–23	25–12		94–82	
21 Mar	19:00	Tytan AZS Częstochowa	1–3	Asseco Resovia	17–25	23–25	25–22	13–25		78–97	

Date	Time		Score		Set 1	Set 2	Set 3	Set 4	Set 5	Total	Report
9 Mar	18:00	ZAKSA Kędzierzyn-Koźle	3–0	Fart Kielce	25–16	25–22	25–22			75–60	
10 Mar	17:00	ZAKSA Kędzierzyn-Koźle	3–1	Fart Kielce	25–17	27–29	25–13	25–19		102–78	
21 Mar	18:00	Fart Kielce	2–3	ZAKSA Kędzierzyn-Koźle	25–20	19–25	17–25	25–23	12–15	98–108	

==== 9th place ====
- (to 3 victories)

Date	Time		Score		Set 1	Set 2	Set 3	Set 4	Set 5	Total	Report
10 Mar	17:00	Indykpol AZS Olsztyn	3–2	Lotos Trefl Gdańsk	23–25	25–19	25–14	26–28	15–10	114–96	
14 Mar	19:00	Lotos Trefl Gdańsk	3–1	Indykpol AZS Olsztyn	27–25	17–25	25–18	25–19		94–87	
21 Mar	18:00	Indykpol AZS Olsztyn	0–3	Lotos Trefl Gdańsk	23–25	23–25	23–25			69–75	
28 Mar	19:00	Lotos Trefl Gdańsk	3–0	Indykpol AZS Olsztyn	25–13	25–21	26–24			76–58	

=== 2nd round ===
==== Semifinals ====
- (to 3 victories)

Date	Time		Score		Set 1	Set 2	Set 3	Set 4	Set 5	Total	Report
4 Apr	20:45	PGE Skra Bełchatów	3–2	Jastrzębski Węgiel	18–25	25–22	21–25	25–22	15–11	104–105	
5 Apr	20:45	PGE Skra Bełchatów	3–0	Jastrzębski Węgiel	25–19	27–25	25–20			77–64	
10 Apr	17:30	Jastrzębski Węgiel	2–3	PGE Skra Bełchatów	25–23	19–25	25–21	26–28	12–15	107–112	

Date	Time		Score		Set 1	Set 2	Set 3	Set 4	Set 5	Total	Report
4 Apr	17:30	ZAKSA Kędzierzyn-Koźle	0–3	Asseco Resovia	19–25	23–25	15–25			57–75	
5 Apr	17:30	ZAKSA Kędzierzyn-Koźle	3–1	Asseco Resovia	24–26	25–23	25–20	25–20		99–89	
10 Apr	20:00	Asseco Resovia	3–2	ZAKSA Kędzierzyn-Koźle	25–23	27–29	23–25	25–15	15–13	115–105	
11 Apr	20:00	Asseco Resovia	3–0	ZAKSA Kędzierzyn-Koźle	26–24	25–21	25–17			76–62	

==== 5th–8th places ====
- (to 2 victories)

Date	Time		Score		Set 1	Set 2	Set 3	Set 4	Set 5	Total	Report
4 Apr	19:00	Fart Kielce	1–3	Tytan AZS Częstochowa	22–25	25–18	21–25	30–32		98–100	
11 Apr	19:00	Tytan AZS Częstochowa	3–1	Fart Kielce	25–20	25–23	17–25	31–29		98–97	

Date	Time		Score		Set 1	Set 2	Set 3	Set 4	Set 5	Total	Report
4 Apr	18:30	AZS Politechnika Warszawska	0–3	Delecta Bydgoszcz	16–25	17–25	24–26			57–76	
10 Apr	18:00	Delecta Bydgoszcz	3–0	AZS Politechnika Warszawska	25–17	25–22	25–18			75–57	

=== 3rd round ===
==== 5th place ====
- (to 3 victories)

Date	Time		Score		Set 1	Set 2	Set 3	Set 4	Set 5	Total	Report
17 Apr	18:00	Delecta Bydgoszcz	2–3	Tytan AZS Częstochowa	22–25	25–20	25–21	20–25	11–15	103–106	
18 Apr	18:00	Delecta Bydgoszcz	2–3	Tytan AZS Częstochowa	25–20	20–25	18–25	25–17	11–15	99–102	
21 Apr	17:00	Tytan AZS Częstochowa	1–3	Delecta Bydgoszcz	24–26	15–25	26–24	19–25		84–100	
22 Apr	15:00	Tytan AZS Częstochowa	1–3	Delecta Bydgoszcz	18–25	23–25	30–28	14–25		85–103	
25 Apr	18:00	Delecta Bydgoszcz	3–0	Tytan AZS Częstochowa	25–19	25–14	26–24			76–57	

==== 3rd place ====
- (to 3 victories)

Date	Time		Score		Set 1	Set 2	Set 3	Set 4	Set 5	Total	Report
17 Apr	18:00	ZAKSA Kędzierzyn-Koźle	1–3	Jastrzębski Węgiel	25–20	20–25	16–25	22–25		83–95	
18 Apr	18:00	ZAKSA Kędzierzyn-Koźle	3–1	Jastrzębski Węgiel	25–21	25–19	24–26	25–21		99–87	
21 Apr	17:00	Jastrzębski Węgiel	3–0	ZAKSA Kędzierzyn-Koźle	25–23	25–22	25–15			75–60	
22 Apr	17:00	Jastrzębski Węgiel	0–3	ZAKSA Kędzierzyn-Koźle	20–25	19–25	22–25			61–75	
25 Apr	20:00	ZAKSA Kędzierzyn-Koźle	3–0	Jastrzębski Węgiel	25–21	25–23	25–19			75–63	

==== Finals ====
- (to 3 victories)

Date	Time		Score		Set 1	Set 2	Set 3	Set 4	Set 5	Total	Report
17 Apr	18:00	PGE Skra Bełchatów	1–3	Asseco Resovia	25–18	24–26	16–25	18–25		83–94	
18 Apr	18:00	PGE Skra Bełchatów	1–3	Asseco Resovia	21–25	19–25	26–24	15–25		81–99	
21 Apr	18:00	Asseco Resovia	1–3	PGE Skra Bełchatów	19–25	15–25	25–16	20–25		79–91	
22 Apr	14:00	Asseco Resovia	3–0	PGE Skra Bełchatów	25–23	25–21	25–15			75–59	

== Final standings ==
Qualified for the 2012–13 CEV Champions League
Qualified for the 2012–13 CEV Cup

Rank	Team
1st place, gold medalist(s)	Asseco Resovia
2nd place, silver medalist(s)	PGE Skra Bełchatów
3rd place, bronze medalist(s)	ZAKSA Kędzierzyn-Koźle
4	Jastrzębski Węgiel
5	Delecta Bydgoszcz
6	Tytan AZS Częstochowa
7	Fart Kielce
8	AZS Politechnika Warszawska
9	Lotos Trefl Gdańsk
10	Indykpol AZS Olsztyn

2012 Polish Champions

5th title
