= Skra Bełchatów =

Polish volleyball club

PGE GiEK Skra Bełchatów
- Full name: Klub Piłki Siatkowej Skra Bełchatów Spółka Akcyjna
- Nickname: Pszczoły (The Bees)
- Founded: 1930 (club); 1957 (volleyball team)
- Ground: Hala Energia (Capacity: 2,700)
- Chairman: Michał Bąkiewicz
- Manager: Krzysztof Stelmach
- Captain: Grzegorz Łomacz
- League: Tauron Liga
- 2025–26: 5th place
- Website: Club home page

Uniforms
| Home | Away |

Skra Bełchatów, competing for sponsorship reasons as PGE GiEK Skra Bełchatów and officially called KPS Skra Bełchatów SA, is a professional men's volleyball club based in Bełchatów in central Poland, founded in 1957. They compete in the Polish Tauron Liga. Skra Bełchatów is the most successful Tauron Liga club based on the total number of league titles (nine).

== Honours ==
=== Domestic ===
- Polish Championship

Winners (9): 2004–05, 2005–06, 2006–07, 2007–08, 2008–09, 2009–10, 2010–11, 2013–14, 2017–18

- Polish Cup

Winners (7): 2004–05, 2005–06, 2006–07, 2008–09, 2010–11, 2011–12, 2015–16

- Polish SuperCup

Winners (4): 2012–13, 2014–15, 2017–18, 2018–19

=== International ===
- CEV Champions League

Silver (1): 2011–12
Semifinalists (1): 2018–19
Final Four (3): 2007–08, 2009–10, 2014–15

- FIVB Club World Championship

Silver (2): 2009, 2010

== Club history ==
Historical images of Skra Bełchatów

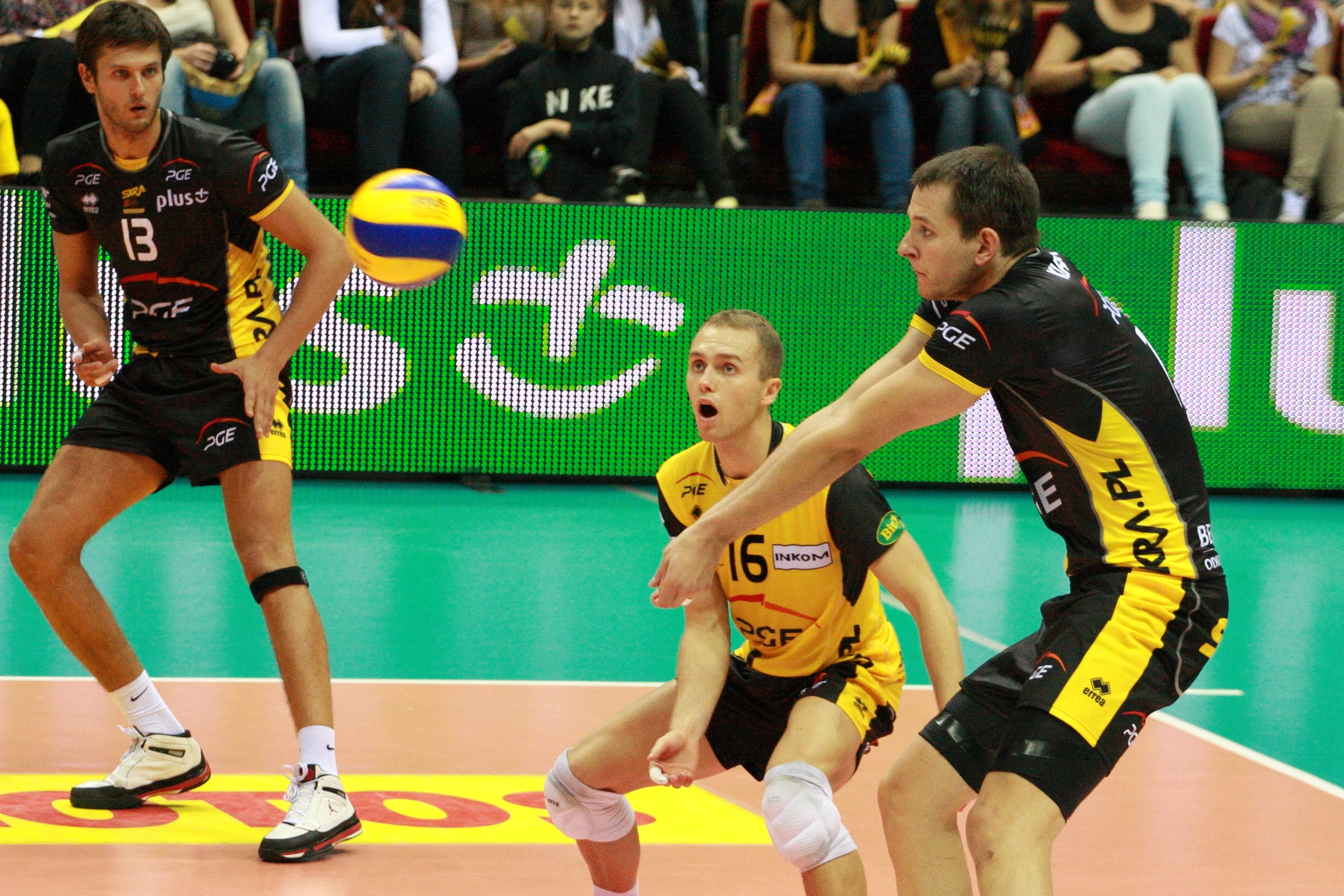
Winiarski, Zatorski and Kurek during a match against Lotos Trefl Gdańsk.

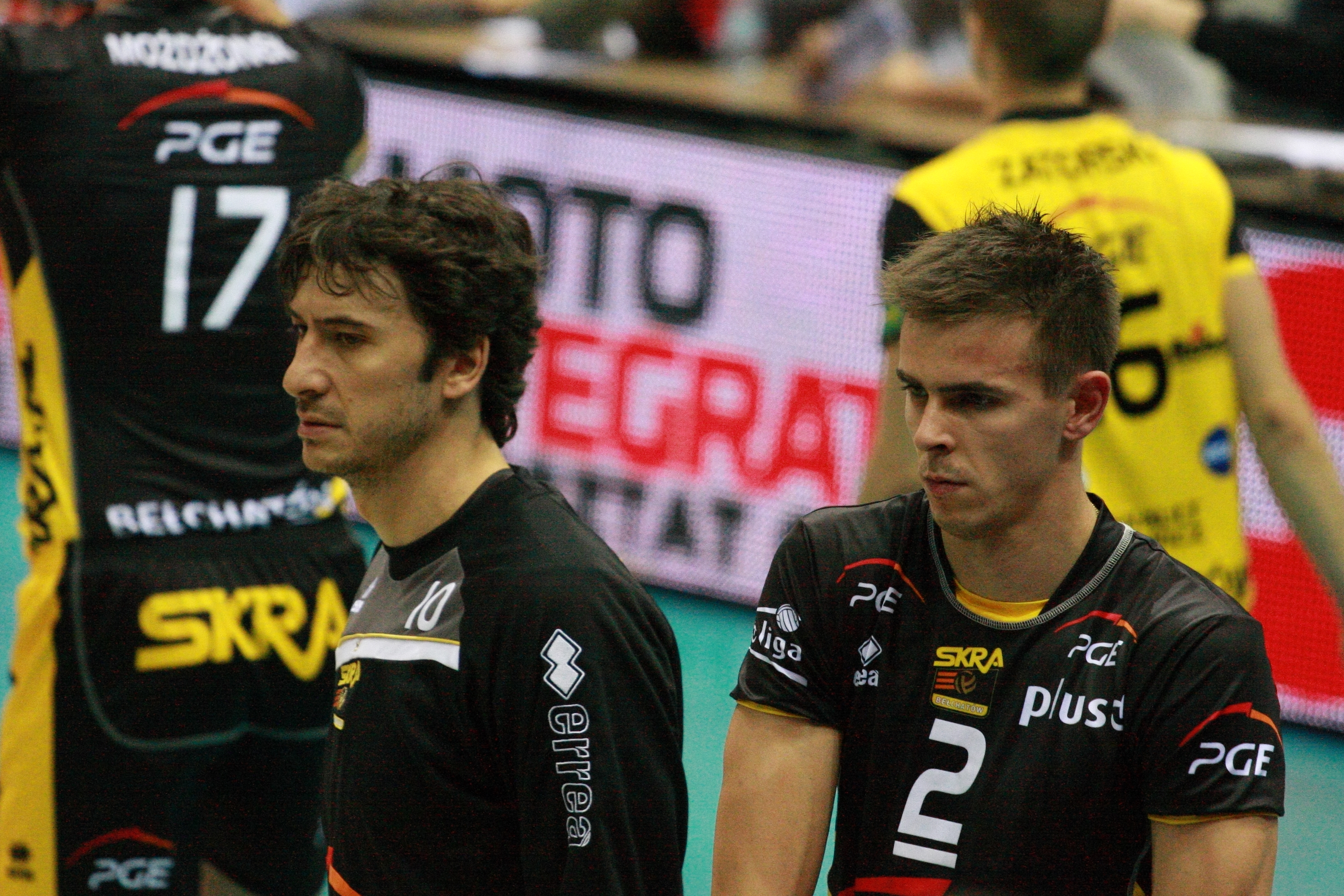
Setter Falasca and the longtime captain of Skra Bełchatów, Wlazły.

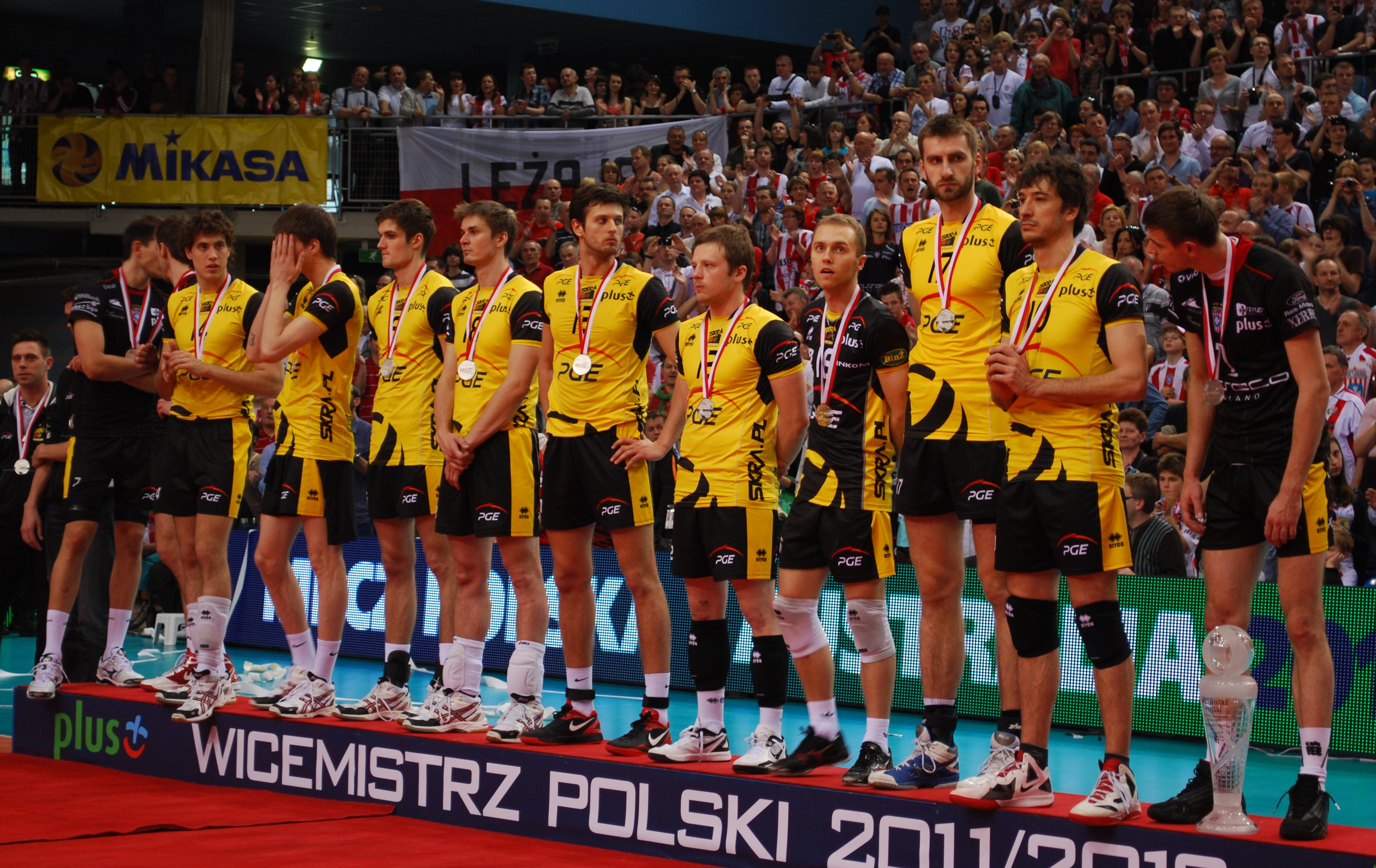
Skra during the 2011–12 PlusLiga season medal ceremony.

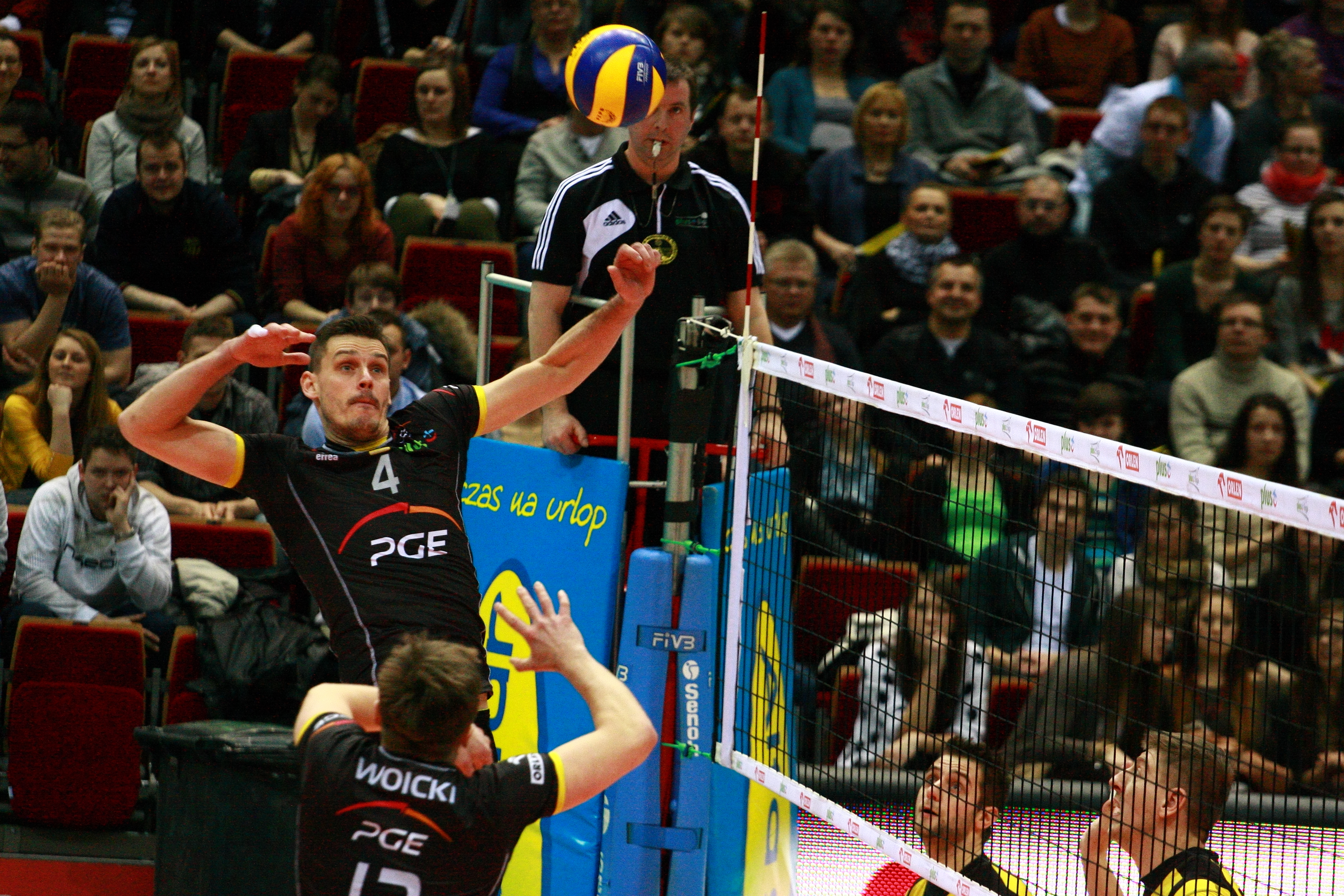
Daniel Pliński and Paweł Woicki playing for Skra against Lotos Trefl Gdańsk in the 2012–13 PlusLiga season.

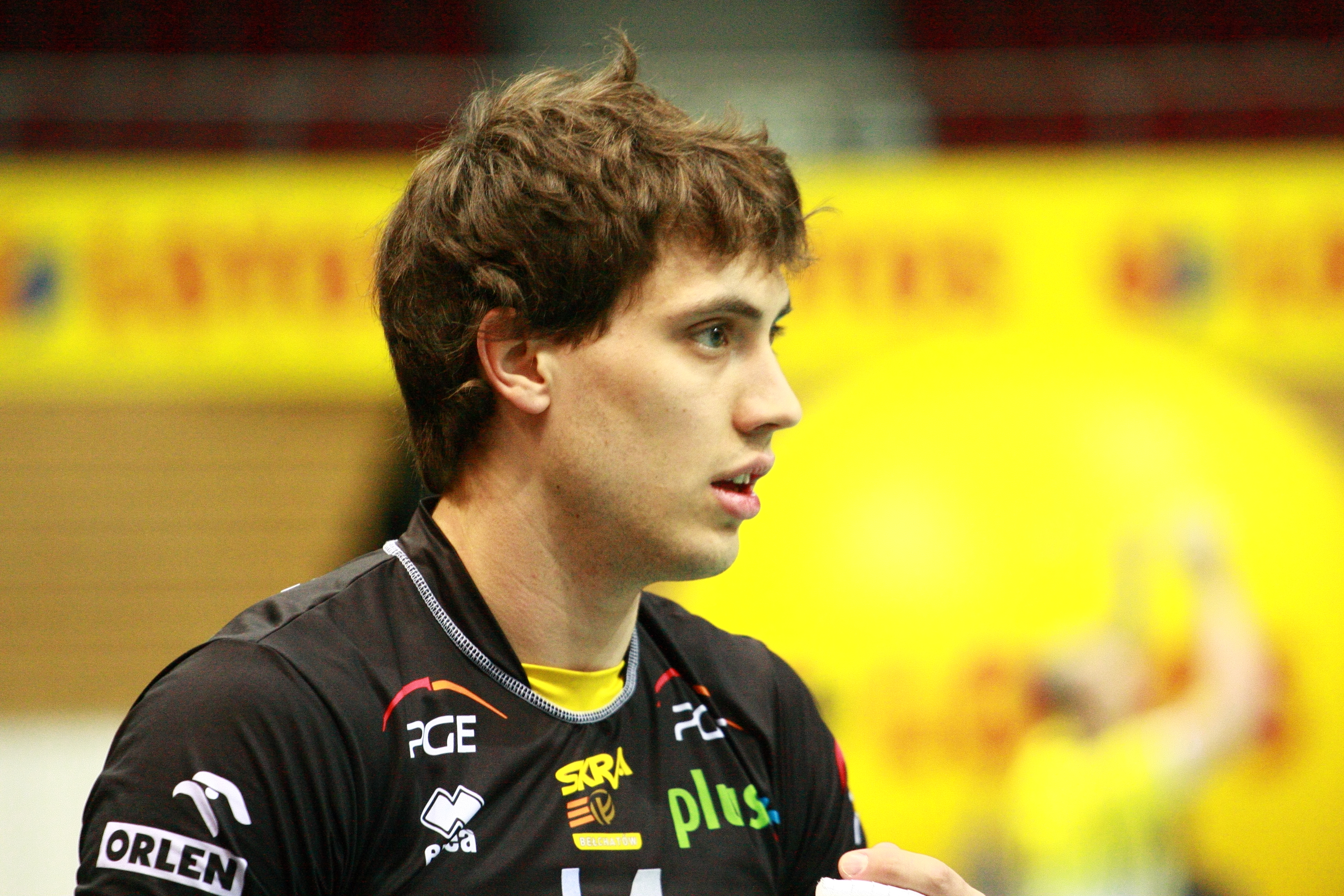
Opposite hitter – Aleksandar Atanasijević during the PlusLiga match against Lotos Trefl Gdańsk.

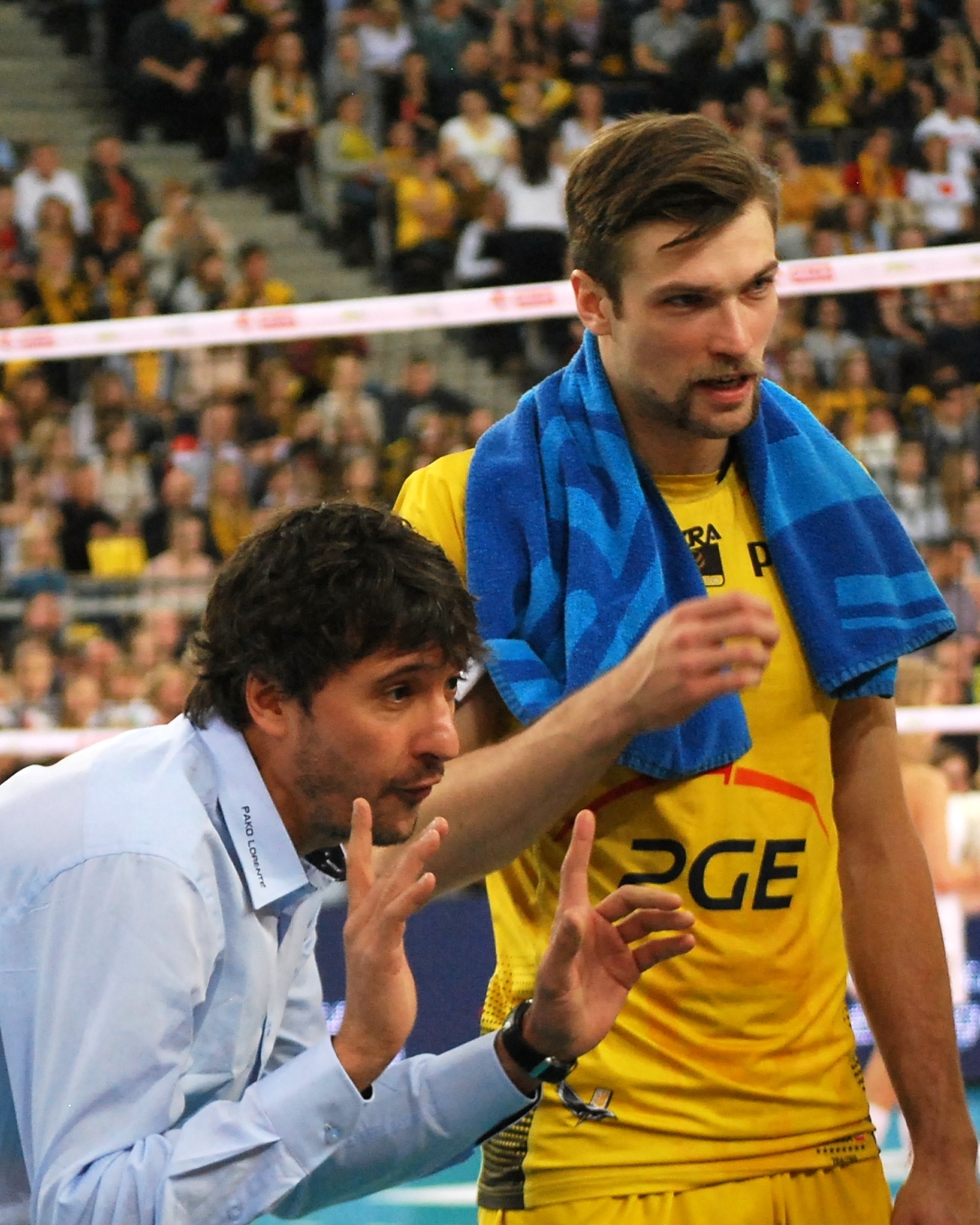
Head coach Miguel Ángel Falasca and Andrzej Wrona during a time-out.

=== Early years (1930–2000) ===
Robotniczy Klub Sportowy (Workers Sports Club) Skra was founded in 1930 in Bełchatów. Initially, it was a football club. In 1957, a volleyball section was created, although it achieved its greatest success during the 21st century. In 1977, the football section was separated from the club and transformed into GKS Bełchatów. In 1991, Bełchatów Power Station became the main sponsor of Skra and the club changed its name to Energetyczny Klub Sportowy (Energetic Sports Club) Skra. In 1994, the club advanced to the Second Polish Volleyball League and in 1997 to the First League "B" series. In 1999, they were promoted to "A" series, but after a year they were relegated to "B" series again.

=== 2001–2010 ===
In 2001, the club led by Wiesław Czaja was promoted to the highest level of the Polish Volleyball League. In their first season there – 2001–02 – the team won the bronze medal of the Polish Championship, defeating Jastrzębski Węgiel after three matches. During the 2002–03 season, Skra took sixth place in the league and lost in the second round of the CEV Cup in a match against Russian club Lokomotiv Yekaterinburg.

In 2003, Ireneusz Mazur became the new head coach of the team. During the 2003–04 season, the club was close to achieving its next medal. Skra lost to AZS Częstochowa after five matches. The team was also defeated in the final match of the Polish Cup by Płomień Sosnowiec. It was during the 2004–05 season that the winning streak for Skra began. The club won its first Polish Champion title after three matches against AZS Olsztyn, and also achieved its first Polish Cup after winning the final match against the same club (3–1). The team repeated that success the following season, winning their second Polish Champion title in four final matches against Jastrzębski Węgiel, and also the Polish Cup for the second year in a row (winning the final match against AZS Częstochowa, 3–0). They lost two matches against the Greek team Iraklis Thessaloniki in the Playoff 6 of the 2005–06 CEV Champions League.

In 2006, Daniel Castellani became the new head coach. Significantly, he was the first coach of the club from outside Poland. He spent three seasons in Bełchatów. During his tenure, PGE Skra won the next three titles of the Polish Champion (2007, 2008, 2009) and two Polish Cups (2007, 2009). In 2008, PGE Skra played as host in the 2007–08 CEV Champions League Final Four held at Hala MOSiR in Łódź. On 29 March 2008, the team lost the semifinal against the Russian club Dynamo Tattransgaz Kazan (2–3). On the next day, PGE Skra players won the bronze medal in a match against the Italian team Sisley Treviso (3–2).

In 2009, Jacek Nawrocki became the new head coach. The first success under his guidance was the silver medal at the 2009 FIVB Club World Championship. At this tournament, after being promoted from Pool B, PGE Skra won their semifinal against Zenit Kazan (3–1), but on 8 November 2009 the Polish club lost the final against Trentino Volley (0–3). Two out of seven individual awards were received by PGE Skra players: Bartosz Kurek was named the Best scorer, and Marcin Możdżonek the Best blocker. In 2010, the Polish team was once again chosen as host of the CEV Champions League Final Four. Skra lost the semifinal against Dynamo Moscow, and won the bronze medal in a match against ACH Volley Bled. Mariusz Wlazły was named the Best scorer of the Final Four tournament. In the 2009–10 PlusLiga season, the club won its sixth Polish Championship title.

PGE Skra won the silver medal at the 2010 FIVB Club World Championship on 21 December. The team once again lost to Trentino Volley (1–3) in the final. During the 2010–11 season, the Polish club won its seventh Polish Championship title and fifth Polish Cup. In the 2010–11 CEV Champions League, the team made it to the Playoff 6 stage where Skra lost to the Russian club Zenit Kazan (2–3, 3–1) in the golden set (11–15).

=== 2011–present ===
The first trophy won by Skra in 2012 was the sixth Polish Cup in the history of the club. On 18 March 2012, PGE Skra achieved a silver medal in the 2011–12 CEV Champions League. They won a match against Arkas İzmir in the semifinal, but lost in the final to Zenit Kazan from Russia in the Final Four held at Atlas Arena in Łódź, Poland. The final match ended controversially; Serbian referee Dejan Jovanović did not call a block by a Russian player, ending the match even though the audience and players saw the touch on the screen. PGE Skra players received three out of eight individual awards. Michał Winiarski was named the Best receiver, the award for the Best spiker was received by Bartosz Kurek, and the title of the Most valuable player was garnered by the team captain Mariusz Wlazły. In the 2011–12 PlusLiga season, the club lost in the final of the Polish Championship to Asseco Resovia, taking silver medals. That defeat ended seven seasons of Skra dominance in PlusLiga. On 18 October, PGE Skra lost the semifinal of the 2012 FIVB Club World Championship to Sada Cruzeiro (2–3). On the next day, the Polish team won the bronze medal in their match against Zenit Kazan (3–2). The opposite Aleksandar Atanasijević was awarded the Best scorer of the tournament. In the 2012–13 PlusLiga season, the club took fifth place and was eliminated from the 2012–13 CEV Champions League by Arkas İzmir.

In 2013, a former setter of the club, Miguel Ángel Falasca, returned to the club from Bełchatów, this time as the club's new head coach. During the 2013–14 PlusLiga season, PGE Skra competed in the CEV Cup, reaching the semifinal, in which they lost to the Russian club Gubierniya Nizhny Novgorod (2–3, 2–3). On 24 October 2013, one of the players—Stéphane Antiga—signed a contract with the Polish Volleyball Federation and became the new head coach of the Polish national team. For the first time in the history of the Polish national team, the current coach was an active player. In the 2013–14 PlusLiga season, PGE Skra won its eighth Polish Championship title.

On 8 October 2014, PGE Skra, as the Polish Champion, played against ZAKSA Kędzierzyn-Koźle (winner of the Polish Cup) for the Polish SuperCup. PGE Skra won 3–1 at Arena Poznań in Poznań. Facundo Conte was awarded the title of Most valuable player of the tournament. In the 2014–15 PlusLiga season, PGE Skra played in the 2014–15 CEV Champions League. They won all the matches in Pool F with a perfect record, winning 18 sets and losing only two. In the Playoff 12, Skra beat the Italian club Cucine Lube Treia (3–0) in Macerata and (3–1) at Atlas Arena, Łódź. They advanced to the Playoff 6, where they met the Italian club Sir Safety Perugia. PGE Skra lost its first match against the Italian team (2–3) and gained 1 point. In the revenge match on 11 March 2015 at Atlas Arena, Łódź, PGE Skra Bełchatów beat Sir Safety Perugia (3–1), gained 3 points, and advanced to the Final Four, which was held in Berlin. They played against another Polish team in the competition—Asseco Resovia—and for the first time in history, two Polish teams were playing in the semifinal of the CEV Champions League Final Four. Skra lost the semifinal to Resovia and the match for third place on the next day to Berlin Recycling Volleys, failing to win a medal. On 6 May 2015, Skra won the bronze medal of the Polish Championship after winning matches against Jastrzębski Węgiel.

On 7 February 2016, PGE Skra won the Polish Cup (beating ZAKSA Kędzierzyn-Koźle 3–2 in the final). The team received four individual awards: Conte was the Best receiver, Lisinac was the Best blocker, and Wlazły was the Best opposite spiker and Most valuable player of the tournament. During the final against ZAKSA, captain Mariusz Wlazły was injured during the tie-break. Skra was eliminated from the 2015–16 CEV Champions League in the Playoff 6 by Zenit Kazan (first match 3–2, second 0–3). After the failure, head coach Miguel Ángel Falasca was dismissed. The decision was announced on 28 March 2016. The management of Skra announced that the duties of head coach to the end of the 2015–16 season were taken over by Falasca's assistant, Italian Fabio Storti, but on the next day the club signed a contract with a new head coach, Philippe Blain. On 7 February 2016, PGE Skra won the Polish Cup after beating ZAKSA in the final. In April 2016, the team won the bronze medal of the 2015–16 PlusLiga.

Before the 2016–17 PlusLiga season, a few significant changes took place in the line-up. One of the team leaders, Facundo Conte, left the club after three years spent in Bełchatów, while two young Polish players joined the team: Bartosz Bednorz and Artur Szalpuk. Skra ended the season in second place, reached the final of the Polish Cup, and made its eleventh appearance in the CEV Champions League (defeat by Cucine Lube Civitanova in the Playoff 12) (1–3, 3–2).

With Roberto Piazza at the helm of the team, Michał Winiarski as an assistant coach, Milad Ebadipour (the first Iranian player in PlusLiga) and Grzegorz Łomacz (who replaced Nicolás Uriarte), Skra won its ninth Polish Championship. The club took fourth place in the FIVB Club World Championship and lost to Cucine Lube Civitanova in the Playoff 12 of the 2017–18 CEV Champions League (2–3, 0–3). Srećko Lisinac left the team after the season.

The next year was marked by the worst result in the last 16 years—sixth place after the 2018–19 PlusLiga season—but on the other hand, a victory in the Polish SuperCup. In the CEV Champions League, Skra once again lost to Cucine Lube Civitanova, this time in the semifinals (0–3, 0–3). After the season, Roberto Piazza was succeeded by a young Polish coach, Michał Mieszko Gogol.

In the 2019–20 PlusLiga season, ended prematurely due to the COVID-19 pandemic, Bełchatów, with 17 victories and 7 defeats, ended the season in third place. The league management decided not to award the clubs with medals. The club's icon, Mariusz Wlazły, announced his departure after 17 years spent playing in Bełchatów. During the transfer period, the club acquired, among others, an American outside hitter Taylor Sander, and Bartosz Filipiak from Trefl Gdańsk. Mateusz Bieniek was sent on loan to Skra from Cucine Lube Civitanova.

== Team ==
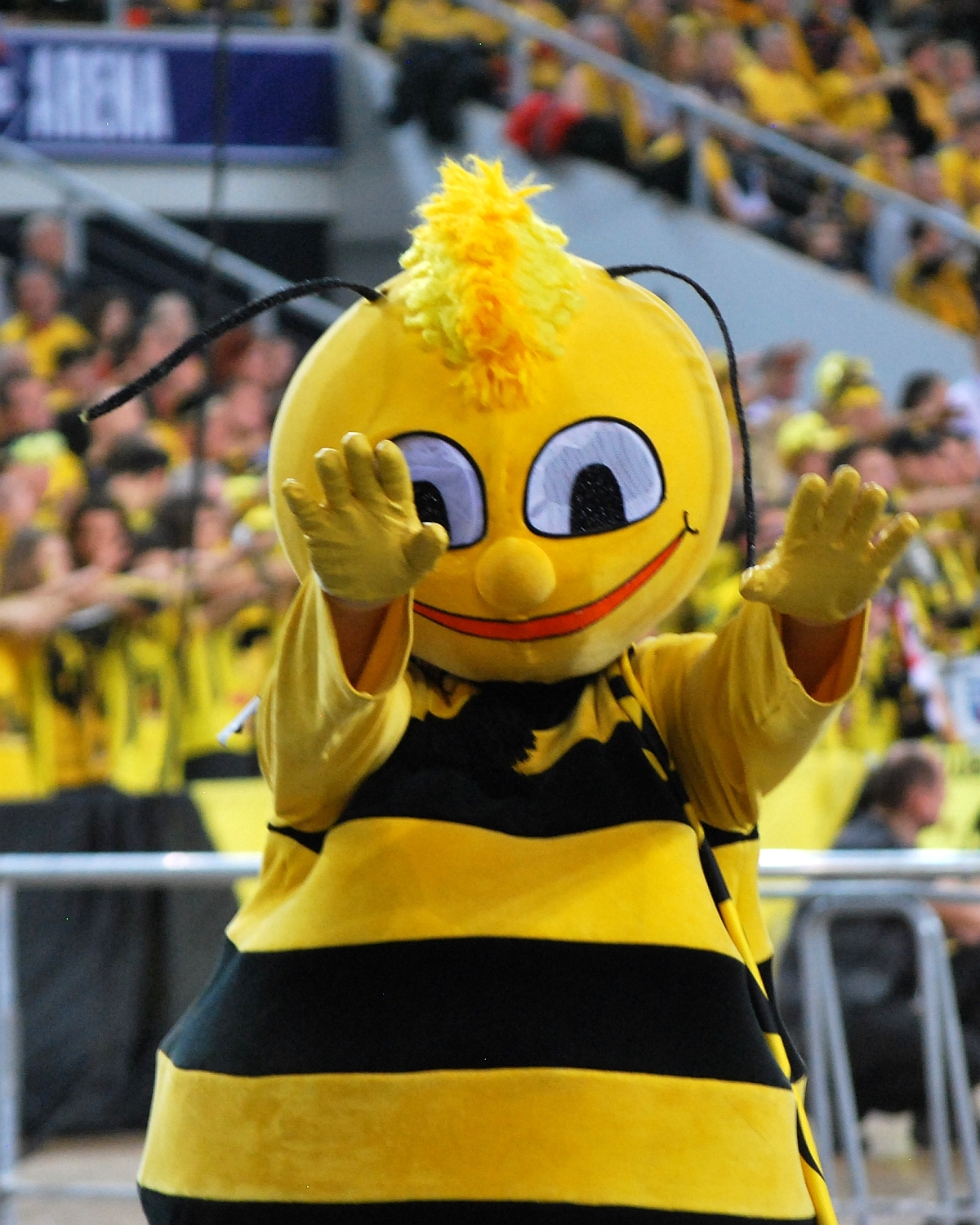
Bee, the official mascot of Skra.

As of 2026–27 season

| No. | Name | Date of birth | Position |
|---|---|---|---|
| 1 | (Brazil) Alan Souza | 21 March 1994 (age 32) | opposite |
| 3 | (Poland) Maksym Kędzierski | 13 March 2003 (age 23) | libero |
| 4 | (Poland) Błażej Bień | 3 November 2005 (age 20) | setter |
| 5 | (Poland) Arkadiusz Żakieta | 13 October 1992 (age 34) | opposite |
| 7 | (Morocco) Zouheir El Graoui | 1 July 1994 (age 32) | outside hitter |
| 9 | (Belgium) Igor Grobelny | 8 June 1993 (age 33) | outside hitter |
| 11 | (France) Antoine Pothron | 5 March 2002 (age 24) | outside hitter |
| 12 | (Poland) Grzegorz Łomacz | 1 October 1987 (age 39) | setter |
| 13 | (Poland) Mateusz Nowak | 29 February 2004 (age 22) | middle blocker |
| 15 | (Poland) Michał Szalacha | 15 January 1994 (age 32) | middle blocker |
| 16 | (Poland) Adam Kowalski | 16 September 1994 (age 32) | libero |
| 19 | (Poland) Bartłomiej Zawalski | 13 February 1999 (age 27) | middle blocker |
| 23 | (Poland) Jordan Zaleszczyk | 23 April 2002 (age 24) | middle blocker |
| 27 | (Poland) Kajetan Tokajuk | 3 June 2000 (age 26) | outside hitter |
| Head coach: | | (Poland) Krzysztof Stelmach | |

== Retired numbers ==
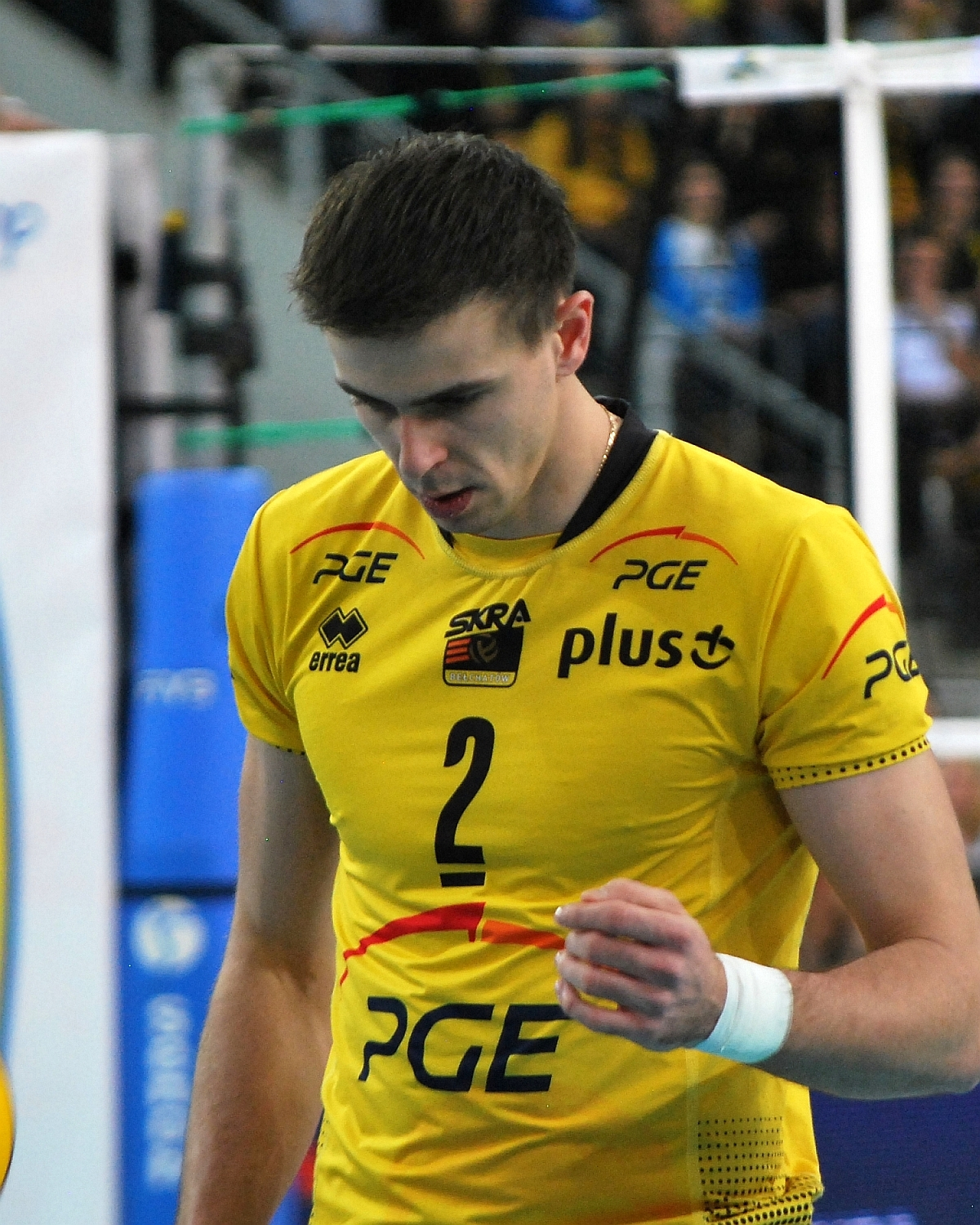
Mariusz Wlazły

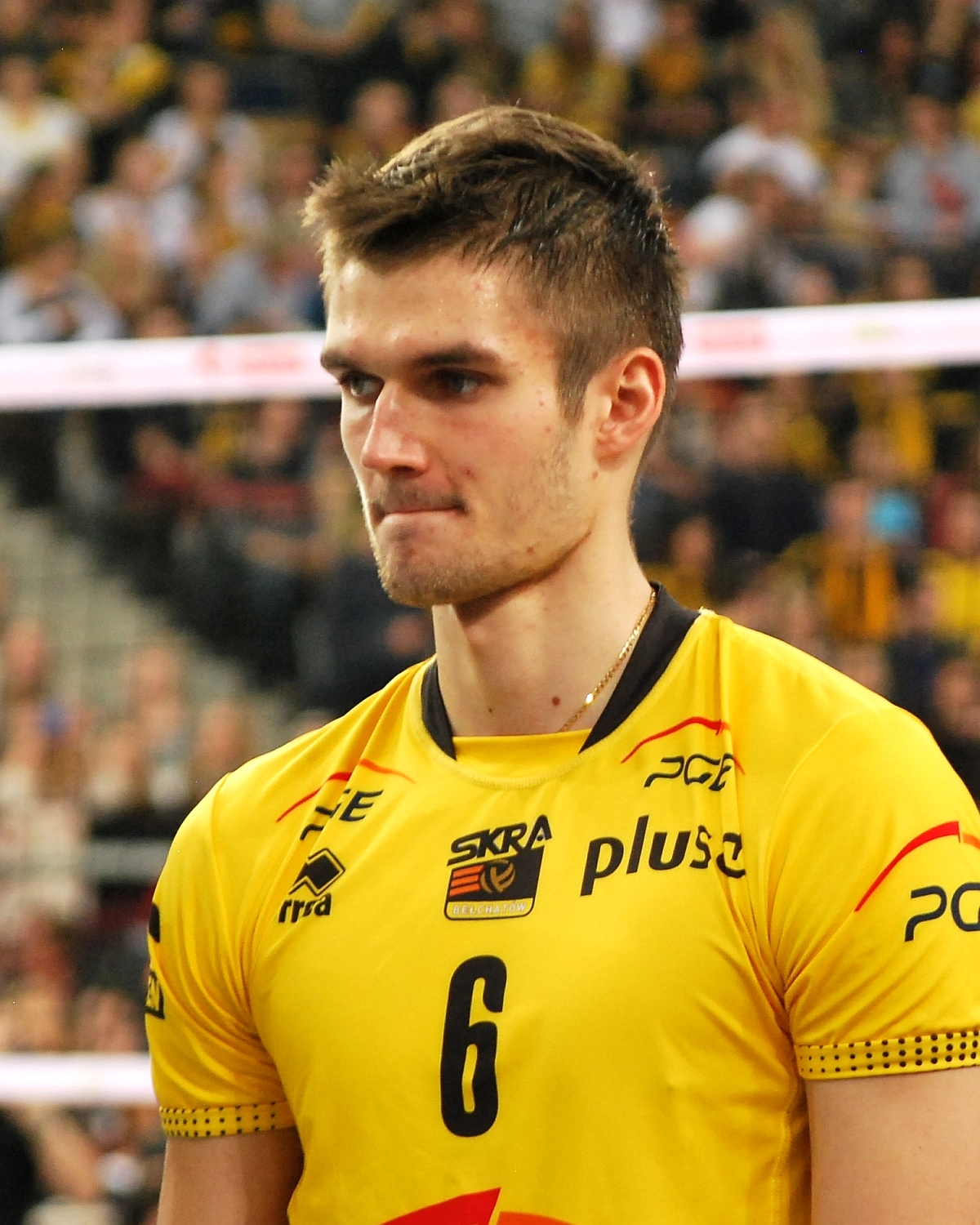
Karol Kłos

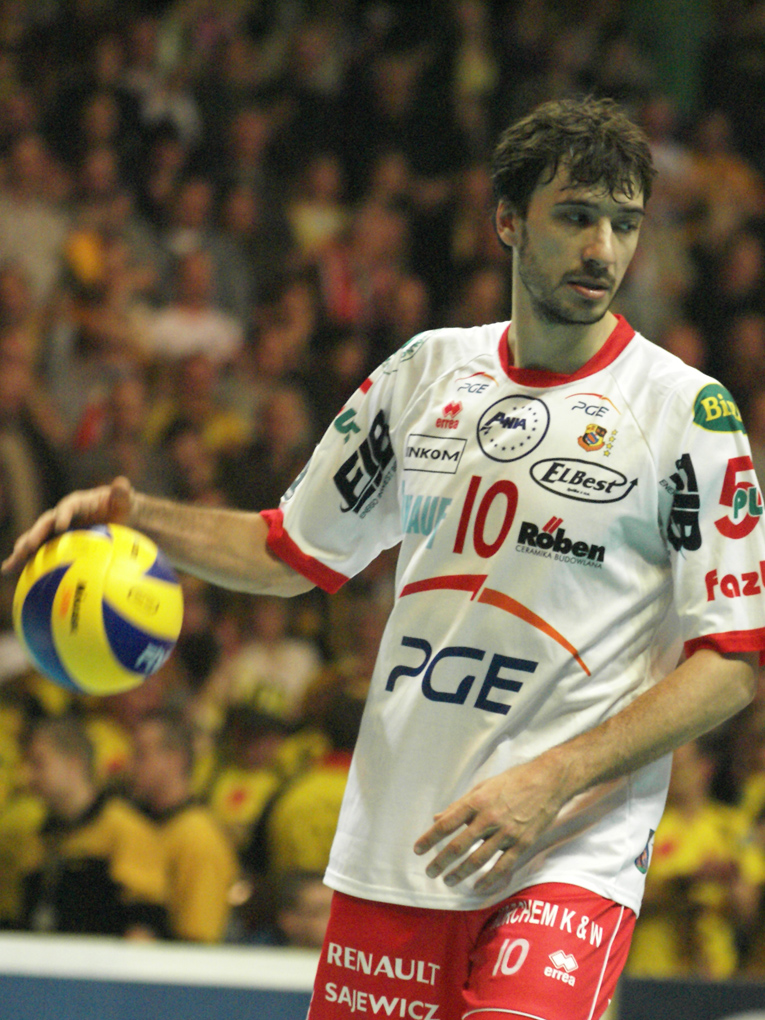
Miguel Ángel Falasca

| No. | Name | Position |
|---|---|---|
| 2 | (Poland) Mariusz Wlazły | opposite |
| 6 | (Poland) Karol Kłos | middle blocker |
| 10 | (Spain) Miguel Ángel Falasca | setter |

== Season by season ==
| Season | Tier | League | Pos. |
|---|---|---|---|
| 2008–09 | 1 | PlusLiga | 1st place, gold medalist(s) |
| 2009–10 | 1 | PlusLiga | 1st place, gold medalist(s) |
| 2010–11 | 1 | PlusLiga | 1st place, gold medalist(s) |
| 2011–12 | 1 | PlusLiga | 2 |
| 2012–13 | 1 | PlusLiga | 5 |
| 2013–14 | 1 | PlusLiga | 1st place, gold medalist(s) |
| 2014–15 | 1 | PlusLiga | 3 |
| 2015–16 | 1 | PlusLiga | 3 |
| 2016–17 | 1 | PlusLiga | 2 |

| Season | Tier | League | Pos. |
|---|---|---|---|
| 2017–18 | 1 | PlusLiga | 1st place, gold medalist(s) |
| 2018–19 | 1 | PlusLiga | 6 |
| 2019–20 | 1 | PlusLiga | 3 |
| 2020–21 | 1 | PlusLiga | 4 |
| 2021–22 | 1 | PlusLiga | 4 |
| 2022–23 | 1 | PlusLiga | 12 |
| 2023–24 | 1 | PlusLiga | 9 |
| 2024–25 | 1 | PlusLiga | 7 |
| 2025–26 | 1 | PlusLiga | 5 |

== Former names ==
| Years | Name |
|---|---|
| 1957–1991 | RKS Skra Bełchatów |
| 1991–2004 | EKS Skra Bełchatów |
| 2004–2005 | KPS Skra Bełchatów |
| 2005–2007 | BOT Skra Bełchatów |
| 2007–2023 | PGE Skra Bełchatów |
| 2023–present | PGE GiEK Skra Bełchatów |

== See also ==
- Skra Bełchatów players
- Skra Bełchatów coaches
