= 2008–09 PlusLiga =

- League: PlusLiga
- Sport: Volleyball
- Duration: 10 October 2008 – 2 May 2009
- Number of teams: 10
- TV partner(s): Polsat Sport
- League champions: PGE Skra Bełchatów (5th title)

Seasons
- ← 2007–08 2009–10 →

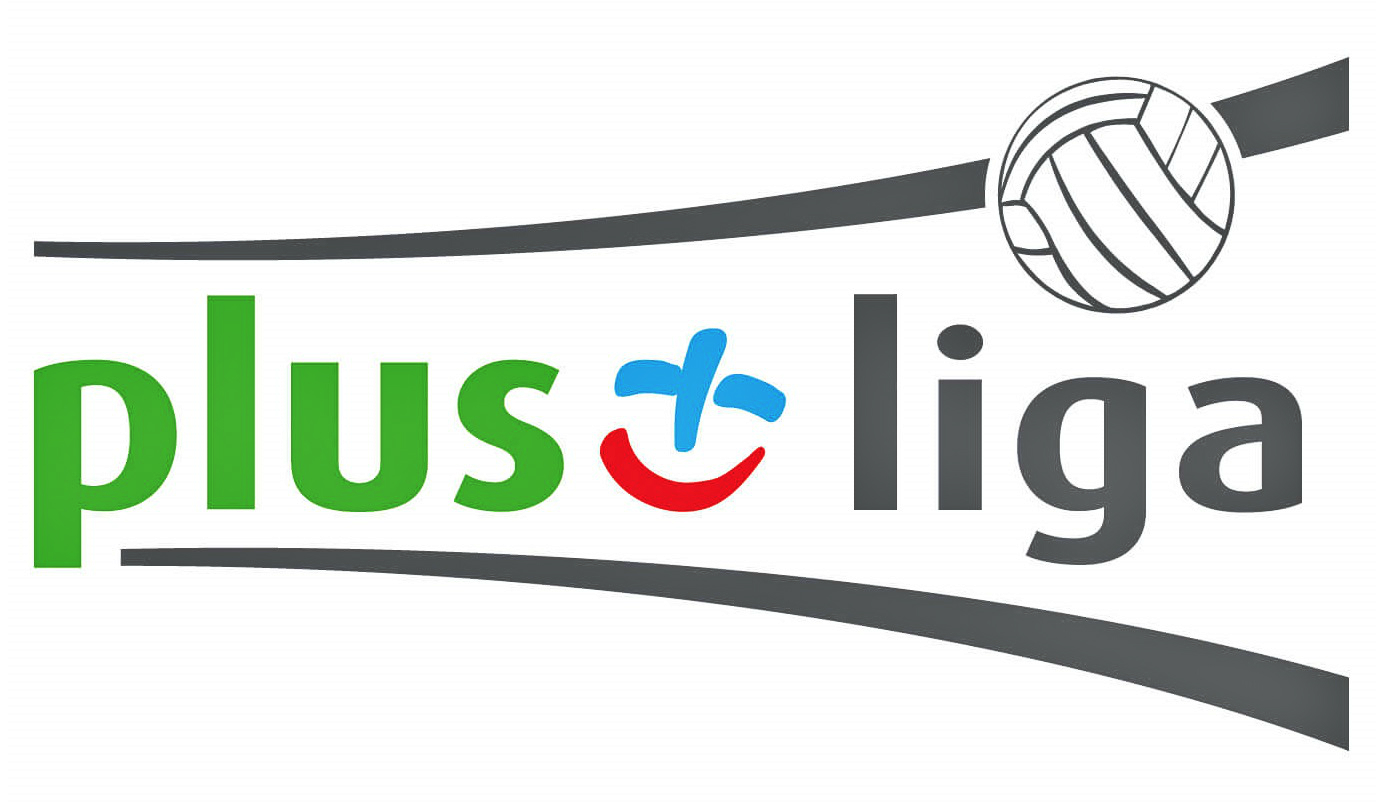
Plusliga logo

The 2008–09 PlusLiga was the 73rd season of the Polish Volleyball Championship, the 9th season as a professional league, the first season under the name PlusLiga organized by the Professional Volleyball League SA (Polish: Profesjonalna Liga Piłki Siatkowej SA) under the supervision of the Polish Volleyball Federation (Polish: Polski Związek Piłki Siatkowej).

PGE Skra Bełchatów won their 5th title of the Polish Champions.

== Regular season ==
Pos	Team	Pld	W	L	Pts	SW	SL	SR	SPW	SPL	SPR	Qualification
1	PGE Skra Bełchatów	18	15	3	45	51	19	2.684	1633	1427	1.144	Playoffs
2	ZAKSA Kędzierzyn-Koźle	18	14	4	40	49	28	1.750	1751	1674	1.046	Playoffs
3	Asseco Resovia	18	13	5	39	43	23	1.870	1541	1389	1.109	Playoffs
4	Jastrzębski Węgiel	18	11	7	32	40	31	1.290	1658	1544	1.074	Playoffs
5	AZS UWM Olsztyn	18	9	9	27	34	34	1.000	1559	1540	1.012	Playoffs
6	Domex Tytan AZS Częstochowa	18	9	9	25	35	39	0.897	1587	1639	0.968	Playoffs
7	J.W. Construction Osram AZS Politechnika Warszawska	18	6	12	22	33	41	0.805	1602	1669	0.960	Playoffs
8	Delecta Bydgoszcz	18	6	12	18	29	45	0.644	1581	1698	0.931	Playoffs
9	Jadar Radom	18	5	13	15	20	43	0.465	1360	1470	0.925	
10	Trefl Gdańsk	18	2	16	7	19	50	0.380	1436	1658	0.866	

Source: PlusLiga

== Playoffs ==
- (to 3 victories)

Quarterfinals
1	PGE Skra Bełchatów	3
8	Delecta Bydgoszcz	0
5	AZS UWM Olsztyn	0
4	Jastrzębski Węgiel	3
3	Asseco Resovia	3
6	Domex Tytan AZS Częstochowa	0
7	J.W. Construction Osram AZS Politechnika Warszawska	0
2	ZAKSA Kędzierzyn-Koźle	3

Semifinals
1	PGE Skra Bełchatów	3
4	Jastrzębski Węgiel	0
3	Asseco Resovia	3
2	ZAKSA Kędzierzyn-Koźle	1

Finals
1	PGE Skra Bełchatów	3
3	Asseco Resovia	0

== Final standings ==
Qualified for the 2009–10 CEV Champions League
Qualified for the 2009–10 CEV Cup
Playoffs with the 2nd team from the 1st league
Relegation to the 1st league

Rank	Team
1st place, gold medalist(s)	PGE Skra Bełchatów
2nd place, silver medalist(s)	Asseco Resovia
3rd place, bronze medalist(s)	Jastrzębski Węgiel
4	ZAKSA Kędzierzyn-Koźle
5	Domex Tytan AZS Częstochowa
6	AZS UWM Olsztyn
7	Delecta Bydgoszcz
8	J.W. Construction Osram AZS Politechnika Warszawska
9	Jadar Radom
10	Trefl Gdańsk

2009 Polish Champions
PGE Skra Bełchatów
5th title
