= 2010–11 PlusLiga =

- League: PlusLiga
- Sport: Volleyball
- Duration: 22 October 2010 – 4 May 2011
- Teams: 10
- TV partner: Polsat Sport
- League champions: PGE Skra Bełchatów (7th title)

Seasons
- 2009–10 2011–12

The 2010–11 PlusLiga was the 75th season of the Polish Volleyball Championship, the 11th season as a professional league organized by the Professional Volleyball League SA (Polish: Profesjonalna Liga Piłki Siatkowej SA) under the supervision of the Polish Volleyball Federation (Polish: Polski Związek Piłki Siatkowej).

PGE Skra Bełchatów won their 7th title of the Polish Champions.

== Regular season ==
Pos	Team	Pld	W	L	Pts	SW	SL	SR	SPW	SPL	SPR	Qualification
1	PGE Skra Bełchatów	18	17	1	47	52	16	3.250	1593	1353	1.177	Playoffs
2	Asseco Resovia	18	14	4	39	47	25	1.880	1630	1530	1.065	Playoffs
3	ZAKSA Kędzierzyn-Koźle	18	11	7	34	45	31	1.452	1701	1575	1.080	Playoffs
4	Tytan AZS Częstochowa	18	11	7	34	40	29	1.379	1539	1508	1.021	Playoffs
5	AZS Politechnika Warszawska	18	10	8	29	38	32	1.188	1581	1575	1.004	Playoffs
6	Delecta Bydgoszcz	18	8	10	23	30	38	0.789	1517	1569	0.967	Playoffs
7	Jastrzębski Węgiel	18	6	12	18	29	42	0.690	1586	1621	0.978	
8	Fart Kielce	18	5	13	18	25	43	0.581	1456	1602	0.909	
9	Pamapol Wielton Wieluń	18	4	14	16	23	44	0.523	1384	1525	0.908	
10	Indykpol AZS UWM Olsztyn	18	4	14	12	20	49	0.408	1480	1609	0.920	

Source: PlusLiga

== Playoffs ==
Semifinals
1	PGE Skra Bełchatów	3
4	Tytan AZS Częstochowa	0
3	ZAKSA Kędzierzyn-Koźle	3
2	Asseco Resovia	1

Finals
1	PGE Skra Bełchatów	3
3	ZAKSA Kędzierzyn-Koźle	1

=== 1st round ===
==== Semifinals 7–10 ====
- (to 3 victories)

Date	Time		Score		Set 1	Set 2	Set 3	Set 4	Set 5	Total	Report
12 Mar	18:00	Fart Kielce	3–2	Indykpol AZS UWM Olsztyn	27–29	25–22	25–20	20–25	15–12	112–108	
19 Mar	18:00	Indykpol AZS UWM Olsztyn	3–2	Fart Kielce	14–25	25–21	26–24	22–25	15–11	102–106	
26 Mar	18:00	Fart Kielce	1–3	Indykpol AZS UWM Olsztyn	19–25	25–21	21–25	32–34		97–105	
4 Apr	18:00	Indykpol AZS UWM Olsztyn	3–2	Fart Kielce	20–25	23–25	25–19	25–23	15–11	108–103	

Date	Time		Score		Set 1	Set 2	Set 3	Set 4	Set 5	Total	Report
13 Mar	15:00	Jastrzębski Węgiel	3–0	Pamapol Wielton Wieluń	25–23	25–17	25–18			75–58	
19 Mar	18:00	Pamapol Wielton Wieluń	2–3	Jastrzębski Węgiel	24–26	20–25	25–22	26–24	9–15	104–112	
2 Apr	17:00	Jastrzębski Węgiel	3–1	Pamapol Wielton Wieluń	25–15	25–21	26–28	25–19		101–83	

=== 2nd round ===
==== Semifinals 1–4 ====
- (to 3 victories)

Date	Time		Score		Set 1	Set 2	Set 3	Set 4	Set 5	Total	Report
2 Apr	18:00	PGE Skra Bełchatów	3–0	Tytan AZS Częstochowa	25–20	25–18	25–19			75–57	
3 Apr	17:00	PGE Skra Bełchatów	3–1	Tytan AZS Częstochowa	28–30	25–23	25–19	25–22		103–94	
6 Apr	18:00	Tytan AZS Częstochowa	1–3	PGE Skra Bełchatów	25–21	23–25	18–25	18–25		84–96	

Date	Time		Score		Set 1	Set 2	Set 3	Set 4	Set 5	Total	Report
2 Apr	14:45	Asseco Resovia	2–3	ZAKSA Kędzierzyn-Koźle	25–19	18–25	18–25	25–17	10–15	96–101	
3 Apr	14:45	Asseco Resovia	3–0	ZAKSA Kędzierzyn-Koźle	25–21	25–19	25–23			75–63	
8 Apr	18:00	ZAKSA Kędzierzyn-Koźle	3–0	Asseco Resovia	25–21	25–21	25–22			75–64	
9 Apr	17:00	ZAKSA Kędzierzyn-Koźle	3–1	Asseco Resovia	25–20	20–25	25–15	25–23		95–83	

=== 3rd round ===
==== 9th place ====
- (to 4 victories)

Date	Time		Score		Set 1	Set 2	Set 3	Set 4	Set 5	Total	Report
13 Apr	18:00	Fart Kielce	2–3	Pamapol Wielton Wieluń	23–25	16–25	27–25	25–12	11–15	102–102	
16 Apr	18:00	Pamapol Wielton Wieluń	0–3	Fart Kielce	21–25	20–25	20–25			61–75	
20 Apr	18:00	Fart Kielce	3–1	Pamapol Wielton Wieluń	23–25	26–24	25–15	25–15		99–79	
28 Apr	18:00	Pamapol Wielton Wieluń	3–1	Fart Kielce	25–20	19–25	25–15	25–22		94–82	
1 May	16:00	Fart Kielce	3–0	Pamapol Wielton Wieluń	28–26	25–19	25–22			78–67	
4 May	18:00	Pamapol Wielton Wieluń	2–3	Fart Kielce	25–23	21–25	25–18	22–25	10–15	103–106	

==== 5th place ====
- (to 3 victories)

Date	Time		Score		Set 1	Set 2	Set 3	Set 4	Set 5	Total	Report
2 Apr	17:00	AZS Politechnika Warszawska	3–0	Delecta Bydgoszcz	25–17	25–18	25–16			75–51	
3 Apr	17:00	AZS Politechnika Warszawska	3–1	Delecta Bydgoszcz	25–20	25–21	20–25	25–16		95–82	
13 Apr	18:00	Delecta Bydgoszcz	1–3	AZS Politechnika Warszawska	20–25	25–19	22–25	24–26		91–95	

==== 3rd place ====
- (to 3 victories)

Date	Time		Score		Set 1	Set 2	Set 3	Set 4	Set 5	Total	Report
13 Apr	18:00	Asseco Resovia	3–2	Tytan AZS Częstochowa	16–25	25–16	15–25	25–23	15–11	96–100	
14 Apr	18:00	Asseco Resovia	3–0	Tytan AZS Częstochowa	25–16	25–22	26–24			76–62	
18 Apr	18:00	Tytan AZS Częstochowa	2–3	Asseco Resovia	22–25	25–20	18–25	25–21	12–15	102–106	

==== Finals ====
- (to 3 victories)

Date	Time		Score		Set 1	Set 2	Set 3	Set 4	Set 5	Total	Report
14 Apr	17:30	PGE Skra Bełchatów	2–3	ZAKSA Kędzierzyn-Koźle	25–23	22–25	25–21	19–25	12–15	103–109	
15 Apr	18:00	PGE Skra Bełchatów	3–1	ZAKSA Kędzierzyn-Koźle	25–14	25–17	18–25	29–27		97–83	
20 Apr	18:00	ZAKSA Kędzierzyn-Koźle	1–3	PGE Skra Bełchatów	22–25	21–25	25–21	22–25		90–96	
21 Apr	19:00	ZAKSA Kędzierzyn-Koźle	0–3	PGE Skra Bełchatów	21–25	20–25	20–25			61–75	

== Final standings ==
Qualified for the 2011–12 CEV Champions League
Qualified for the 2011–12 CEV Cup
Qualified for the 2011–12 CEV Challenge Cup
Playoffs with the 2nd team from the 1st league
Relegation to the 1st league

Rank	Team
1st place, gold medalist(s)	PGE Skra Bełchatów
2nd place, silver medalist(s)	ZAKSA Kędzierzyn-Koźle
3rd place, bronze medalist(s)	Asseco Resovia
4	Tytan AZS Częstochowa
5	AZS Politechnika Warszawska
6	Delecta Bydgoszcz
7	Jastrzębski Węgiel
8	Indykpol AZS UWM Olsztyn
9	Fart Kielce
10	Pamapol Wielton Wieluń

2011 Polish Champions

7th title
