= 2009–10 PlusLiga =

- League: PlusLiga
- Sport: Volleyball
- Duration: 9 October 2009 – 22 May 2010
- Number of teams: 10
- TV partner(s): Polsat Sport
- League champions: PGE Skra Bełchatów (6th title)

Seasons
- ← 2008–09 2010–11 →

The 2009–10 PlusLiga was the 74th season of the Polish Volleyball Championship, the 10th season as a professional league organized by the Professional Volleyball League SA (Polish: Profesjonalna Liga Piłki Siatkowej SA) under the supervision of the Polish Volleyball Federation (Polish: Polski Związek Piłki Siatkowej).

PGE Skra Bełchatów won their 6th title of the Polish Champions.

== Regular season ==
Pos	Team	Pld	W	L	Pts	SW	SL	SR	SPW	SPL	SPR	Qualification
1	PGE Skra Bełchatów	18	16	2	47	50	18	2.778	1618	1425	1.135	Playoffs
2	ZAKSA Kędzierzyn-Koźle	18	13	5	39	46	23	2.000	1556	1391	1.119	Playoffs
3	Jastrzębski Węgiel	18	14	4	38	45	23	1.957	1595	1507	1.058	Playoffs
4	Asseco Resovia	18	12	6	37	41	23	1.783	1489	1369	1.088	Playoffs
5	Domex Tytan AZS Częstochowa	18	9	9	26	38	35	1.086	1600	1635	0.979	Playoffs
6	Delecta Bydgoszcz	18	8	10	24	30	38	0.789	1496	1574	0.950	Playoffs
7	AZS UWM Olsztyn	18	5	13	17	24	43	0.558	1425	1532	0.930	Playoffs
8	Pamapol Wielton Wieluń	18	5	13	16	24	41	0.585	1402	1477	0.949	Playoffs
9	Jadar Radom	18	4	14	14	20	46	0.435	1436	1591	0.903	
10	Neckermann AZS Politechnika Warszawska	18	4	14	12	19	47	0.404	1413	1529	0.924	

Source: PlusLiga

== Playoffs ==
- (to 3 victories)

Quarterfinals
1	PGE Skra Bełchatów	3
8	Pamapol Siatkarz Wieluń	0
5	Domex Tytan AZS Częstochowa	0
4	Asseco Resovia	3
3	Jastrzębski Węgiel	3
6	Delecta Bydgoszcz	1
7	AZS UWM Olsztyn	1
2	ZAKSA Kędzierzyn-Koźle	3

Semifinals
1	PGE Skra Bełchatów	3
4	Asseco Resovia	1
3	Jastrzębski Węgiel	3
2	ZAKSA Kędzierzyn-Koźle	2

Finals
1	PGE Skra Bełchatów	3
3	Jastrzębski Węgiel	1

== Final standings ==
Qualified for the 2010–11 CEV Champions League
Qualified for the 2010–11 CEV Cup
Qualified for the 2010–11 CEV Challenge Cup
Playoffs with the 2nd team from the 1st league
Relegation to the 1st league

Rank	Team
1st place, gold medalist(s)	PGE Skra Bełchatów
2nd place, silver medalist(s)	Jastrzębski Węgiel
3rd place, bronze medalist(s)	Asseco Resovia
4	ZAKSA Kędzierzyn-Koźle
5	Domex Tytan AZS Częstochowa
6	Delecta Bydgoszcz
7	AZS UWM Olsztyn
8	Pamapol Siatkarz Wieluń
9	Jadar Radom
10	Neckermann AZS Politechnika Warszawska

2010 Polish Champions
PGE Skra Bełchatów
6th title
