= 2017–18 ZAKSA Kędzierzyn-Koźle season =

ZAKSA Kędzierzyn-Koźle
2017–18 season
- Chairman: Mirosław Ptasiński
- Manager: Andrea Gardini

ZAKSA Kędzierzyn-Koźle 2017–2018 season is the 2017/2018 volleyball season for Polish professional volleyball club ZAKSA Kędzierzyn-Koźle.

The club competes in:

- Polish SuperCup
- Polish Championship
- Polish Cup
- FIVB Club World Championship
- CEV Champions League

== Team roster ==
| Head coach: | Andrea Gardini |
| Assistant: | Michał Chadała |
| Coach of physical preparation: | Piotr Pietrzak |
| Physiotherapists: | Remigiusz Koteluk, Paweł Brandt |
| Scoutman: | Iwo Wagner |
| Manager: | Tomasz Drzyzga |

| No. | Name | Date of birth | Position |
|---|---|---|---|
| 1 | (Poland) Paweł Zatorski | June 21, 1990 (age 34) | libero |
| 2 | (Poland) Krzysztof Bieńkowski | June 19, 1995 (age 29) | setter |
| 3 | (Poland) Rafał Szymura | August 29, 1995 (age 29) | outside hitter |
| 4 | (Poland) Krzysztof Rejno | February 22, 1993 (age 32) | middle blocker |
| 5 | (Italy) Marco Falaschi | September 18, 1987 (age 37) | setter |
| 7 | (Poland) Rafał Buszek | April 28, 1987 (age 37) | outside hitter |
| 8 | (Poland) Sławomir Jungiewicz | June 21, 1989 (age 35) | opposite |
| 9 | (Poland) Łukasz Wiśniewski | February 3, 1989 (age 36) | middle blocker |
| 10 | (Poland) Mateusz Bieniek | April 5, 1994 (age 30) | middle blocker |
| 11 | (Poland) Bartosz Jastrowicz | August 8, 1996 (age 28) | outside hitter |
| 11 | (Puerto Rico) Maurice Torres | July 6, 1991 (age 33) | opposite |
| 13 | (Poland) Kamil Semeniuk | July 16, 1996 (age 28) | outside hitter |
| 15 | (Belgium) Sam Deroo | April 24, 1992 (age 32) | outside hitter |
| 16 | (France) Benjamin Toniutti | October 30, 1989 (age 35) | setter |
| 17 | (Poland) Aleksander Maziarz | April 22, 1995 (age 29) | middle blocker |
| 18 | (Poland) Korneliusz Banach | January 25, 1994 (age 31) | libero |

== Squad changes for the 2017–2018 season ==
In:

| No. | Player | Position | From |
|---|---|---|---|
| 2 | (Poland) Krzysztof Bieńkowski | setter | BBTS Bielsko-Biała |
| 3 | (Poland) Rafał Szymura | outside hitter | AZS Częstochowa |
| 4 | (Poland) Krzysztof Rejno | middle blocker | MKS Będzin |
| 5 | (Italy) Marco Falaschi | setter | GKS Katowice |
| 8 | (Poland) Sławomir Jungiewicz | opposite | TV Bühl |
| 11 | (Puerto Rico) Maurice Torres | opposite | CMC Ravenna |

Out:

| No. | Player | Position | To |
|---|---|---|---|
| 2 | (France) Kévin Tillie | outside hitter | Jastrzębski Węgiel |
| 3 | (Poland) Dominik Witczak | opposite | GKS Katowice |
| 6 | (Poland) Dawid Konarski | opposite | Ziraat Bankası Ankara |
| 12 | (Poland) Grzegorz Bociek | opposite | Aluron Virtu Warta Zawiercie |
| 14 | (Poland) Grzegorz Pająk | setter | Aluron Virtu Warta Zawiercie |
| 19 | (Poland) Patryk Czarnowski | middle blocker | PGE Skra Bełchatów |

== Most Valuable Players ==
| No. | Player | MVP |
|---|---|---|
| 1. | Sam Deroo | 5 |
| | Benjamin Toniutti | 5 |
| 3. | Maurice Torres | 4 |
| 4. | Paweł Zatorski | 2 |
| | Mateusz Bieniek | 2 |
| 6. | Rafał Szymura | 1 |
| | Kamil Semeniuk | 1 |
| | Łukasz Wiśniewski | 1 |

== Results, schedules and standings ==
=== 2017 Polish SuperCup ===
On September 23, 2017 PGE Skra beat ZAKSA Kędzierzyn-Koźle and achieved their third Polish SuperCup in history. Bartosz Bednorz was awarded a title of the Most Valuable Player.

| September 23, 2017; 19:00 | ZAKSA Kędzierzyn-Koźle | 1–3 | PGE Skra Bełchatów | Energia Hall, Bełchatów; Referees: Niemczura Waldemar - Lagierski Marek |
| September 23, 2017; 19:00 | (25–16, 17–25, 33–35, 21–25) MVP: Bartosz Bednorz | | | Energia Hall, Bełchatów; Referees: Niemczura Waldemar - Lagierski Marek |

=== 2017–18 PlusLiga ===
==== Regular season ====
| 1 October 2017; 20:00 | Aluron Virtu Warta Zawiercie | 1–3 | ZAKSA Kędzierzyn-Koźle | Hala OSiR II, Zawiercie; Attendance: 1,500; Referees: Mariusz Gadzina - Maciej Kolendowski |
| 1 October 2017; 20:00 | (23–25, 25–18, 24–26, 15–25) MVP: Benjamin Toniutti | | | Hala OSiR II, Zawiercie; Attendance: 1,500; Referees: Mariusz Gadzina - Maciej Kolendowski |

| 11 October 2017; 20:30 | ZAKSA Kędzierzyn-Koźle | 3–0 | Jastrzębski Węgiel | Azoty Hall, Kędzierzyn-Koźle; Referees: Szymon Pindral - Maciej Twardowski |
| 11 October 2017; 20:30 | (25–17, 25–18, 33–31) MVP: Sam Deroo | | | Azoty Hall, Kędzierzyn-Koźle; Referees: Szymon Pindral - Maciej Twardowski |

| 7 October 2017; 13:00 | Asseco Resovia Rzeszów | 1–3 | ZAKSA Kędzierzyn-Koźle | Podpromie Hall, Rzeszów; Attendance: 4,286; Referees: Marek Lagierski - Wojciech Maroszek |
| 7 October 2017; 13:00 | (35–33, 18–25, 23–25, 24–26) MVP: Sam Deroo | | | Podpromie Hall, Rzeszów; Attendance: 4,286; Referees: Marek Lagierski - Wojciech Maroszek |

| 14 November 2017; 18:30 | ZAKSA Kędzierzyn-Koźle | 3–2 | Indykpol AZS Olsztyn | Azoty Hall, Kędzierzyn-Koźle; Attendance: 1,758; Referees: Zbigniew Wolski - Maciej Maciejewski |
| 14 November 2017; 18:30 | (21–25, 25–19, 20–25, 25–17, 15–9) MVP: Sam Deroo | | | Azoty Hall, Kędzierzyn-Koźle; Attendance: 1,758; Referees: Zbigniew Wolski - Maciej Maciejewski |

| 18 October 2017; 20:30 | Cuprum Lubin | 1–3 | ZAKSA Kędzierzyn-Koźle | HWS RCS, Lubin; Attendance: 2,100; Referees: Tomasz Flis - Mariusz Gadzina |
| 18 October 2017; 20:30 | (24–26, 25–18, 24–26, 20–25) MVP: Mateusz Bieniek | | | HWS RCS, Lubin; Attendance: 2,100; Referees: Tomasz Flis - Mariusz Gadzina |

| 21 October 2017; 17:00 | ZAKSA Kędzierzyn-Koźle | 3–0 | Cerrad Czarni Radom | Azoty Hall, Kędzierzyn-Koźle; Attendance: 2,850; Referees: Marek Lagierski - Wojciech Maroszek |
| 21 October 2017; 17:00 | (25–17, 25–20, 30–28) MVP: Paweł Zatorski | | | Azoty Hall, Kędzierzyn-Koźle; Attendance: 2,850; Referees: Marek Lagierski - Wojciech Maroszek |

| 28 October 2017; 14:45 | Łuczniczka Bydgoszcz | 0–3 | ZAKSA Kędzierzyn-Koźle | Łuczniczka, Bydgoszcz; Attendance: 2,948; Referees: Jarosław Makowski - Marek Heyducki |
| 28 October 2017; 14:45 | (21–25, 18–25, 18–25) MVP: Sam Deroo | | | Łuczniczka, Bydgoszcz; Attendance: 2,948; Referees: Jarosław Makowski - Marek Heyducki |

| 4 November 2017; 17:00 | ZAKSA Kędzierzyn-Koźle' | 3–1 | ONICO Warsaw | Azoty Hall, Kędzierzyn-Koźle; Attendance: 2,500; Referees: Waldemar Niemczura - Piotr Król |
| 4 November 2017; 17:00 | (25–17, 25–22, 25–27, 26–24) MVP: Maurice Torres | | | Azoty Hall, Kędzierzyn-Koźle; Attendance: 2,500; Referees: Waldemar Niemczura - Piotr Król |

| 21 November 2017; 19:45 | GKS Katowice | 0–3 | ZAKSA Kędzierzyn-Koźle | Spodek, Katowice; Attendance: 4,200; Referees: Marcin Herbik - Tomasz Janik |
| 21 November 2017; 19:45 | (14–25, 16–25, 13–25) MVP: Benjamin Toniutti | | | Spodek, Katowice; Attendance: 4,200; Referees: Marcin Herbik - Tomasz Janik |

| 18 November 2017; 17:00 | ZAKSA Kędzierzyn-Koźle | 3–1 | MKS Będzin | Azoty Hall, Kędzierzyn-Koźle; Attendance: 1,700; Referees: Piotr Skowroński - Marek Heyducki |
| 18 November 2017; 17:00 | (25–13, 22–25, 25–13, 25–21) MVP: Kamil Semeniuk | | | Azoty Hall, Kędzierzyn-Koźle; Attendance: 1,700; Referees: Piotr Skowroński - Marek Heyducki |

| 24 November 2017; 18:00 | Espadon Szczecin | 2–3 | ZAKSA Kędzierzyn-Koźle | Azoty Arena, Szczecin; Attendance: 3,500; Referees: Zbigniew Wolski - Jacek Broński |
| 24 November 2017; 18:00 | (21–25, 27–25, 25–21, 14–25, 9–15) MVP: Sam Deroo | | | Azoty Arena, Szczecin; Attendance: 3,500; Referees: Zbigniew Wolski - Jacek Broński |

| 2 December 2017; 17:00 | ZAKSA Kędzierzyn-Koźle | 3–0 | Dafi Społem Kielce | Azoty Hall, Kędzierzyn-Koźle; Attendance: 1,514; Referees: Jacek Litwin - Maciej Kolendowski |
| 2 December 2017; 17:00 | (25–14, 25–14, 25–18) MVP: Benjamin Toniutti | | | Azoty Hall, Kędzierzyn-Koźle; Attendance: 1,514; Referees: Jacek Litwin - Maciej Kolendowski |

| 8 November 2017; 18:30 | ZAKSA Kędzierzyn-Koźle | 3–0 | BBTS Bielsko-Biała | Dębowiec Sports Arena, Bielsko-Biała; Attendance: 1,069; Referees: Szymon Pindral - Mariusz Gadzina |
| 8 November 2017; 18:30 | (25–10, 25–15, 25–18) MVP: Rafał Szymura | | | Dębowiec Sports Arena, Bielsko-Biała; Attendance: 1,069; Referees: Szymon Pindral - Mariusz Gadzina |

| 23 December 2017; 14:45 | Trefl Gdańsk | 0–3 | ZAKSA Kędzierzyn-Koźle | Ergo Arena, Gdańsk; Attendance: 3,200; Referees: Maciej Twardowski - Szymon Pindral |
| 23 December 2017; 14:45 | (20–25, 20–25, 23–25) MVP: Benjamin Toniutti | | | Ergo Arena, Gdańsk; Attendance: 3,200; Referees: Maciej Twardowski - Szymon Pindral |

| 30 December 2017; 14:45 | ZAKSA Kędzierzyn-Koźle | 3–1 | PGE Skra Bełchatów | Azoty Hall, Kędzierzyn-Koźle; Attendance: 3,000; Referees: Piotr Król - Waldemar Niemczura |
| 30 December 2017; 14:45 | (25–20, 25–21, 20–25, 25–20) MVP: Paweł Zatorski | | | Azoty Hall, Kędzierzyn-Koźle; Attendance: 3,000; Referees: Piotr Król - Waldemar Niemczura |

| 6 January 2018; 17:00 | ZAKSA Kędzierzyn-Koźle | 3–1 | Aluron Virtu Warta Zawiercie | Azoty Hall, Kędzierzyn-Koźle; Attendance: 2,300; Referees: Maciej Twardowski - Tomasz Flis |
| 6 January 2018; 17:00 | (22–25, 25–17, 25–23, 26–24) MVP: Maurice Torres | | | Azoty Hall, Kędzierzyn-Koźle; Attendance: 2,300; Referees: Maciej Twardowski - Tomasz Flis |

| 13 January 2018; 14:45 | Jastrzębski Węgiel | 1–3 | ZAKSA Kędzierzyn-Koźle | HWS, Jastrzębie-Zdrój; Attendance: 3,052; Referees: Marcin Herbik - Magdalena Niewiarowska |
| 13 January 2018; 14:45 | (27–25, 17–25, 20–25, 21–25) MVP: Maurice Torres | | | HWS, Jastrzębie-Zdrój; Attendance: 3,052; Referees: Marcin Herbik - Magdalena Niewiarowska |

| 21 January 2018; 20:00 | ZAKSA Kędzierzyn-Koźle | 1–3 | Asseco Resovia Rzeszów | Azoty Hall, Kędzierzyn-Koźle; Attendance: 2,100; Referees: Wojciech Maroszek - Marek Lagierski |
| 21 January 2018; 20:00 | (25–21, 22–25, 25–27, 22–25) MVP: Aleksander Śliwka | | | Azoty Hall, Kędzierzyn-Koźle; Attendance: 2,100; Referees: Wojciech Maroszek - Marek Lagierski |

| 3 February 2018; 14:45 | Indykpol AZS Olsztyn | 0–3 | ZAKSA Kędzierzyn-Koźle | Urania Hall, Olsztyn; Attendance: 2,400; Referees: Mariusz Gadzina - Jacek Litwin |
| 3 February 2018; 14:45 | (17–25, 22–25, 15–25) MVP: Mateusz Bieniek | | | Urania Hall, Olsztyn; Attendance: 2,400; Referees: Mariusz Gadzina - Jacek Litwin |

| 10 February 2018; 18:00 | ZAKSA Kędzierzyn-Koźle | 3–0 | Cuprum Lubin | Azoty Hall, Kędzierzyn-Koźle; Attendance: 1,350; Referees: Zbigniew Wolski - Szymon Pindral |
| 10 February 2018; 18:00 | (25–22, 25–23, 25–23) MVP: Benjamin Toniutti | | | Azoty Hall, Kędzierzyn-Koźle; Attendance: 1,350; Referees: Zbigniew Wolski - Szymon Pindral |

| 17 February 2018; 17:00 | Cerrad Czarni Radom | 1–3 | ZAKSA Kędzierzyn-Koźle | Hala MOSiR, Radom; Attendance: 1,500; Referees: Mariusz Gadzina - Szymon Pindral |
| 17 February 2018; 17:00 | (25–20, 21–25, 16–25, 18–25) MVP: Łukasz Wiśniewski | | | Hala MOSiR, Radom; Attendance: 1,500; Referees: Mariusz Gadzina - Szymon Pindral |

| 24 February 2018; 17:00 | ZAKSA Kędzierzyn-Koźle | 3–1 | Łuczniczka Bydgoszcz | Azoty Hall, Kędzierzyn-Koźle; Attendance: 1,542; Referees: Waldemar Niemczura - Wojciech Maroszek |
| 24 February 2018; 17:00 | (22–25, 25–17, 25–17, 25–15) MVP: Maurice Torres | | | Azoty Hall, Kędzierzyn-Koźle; Attendance: 1,542; Referees: Waldemar Niemczura - Wojciech Maroszek |

| 20 February 2018; 19:00 | ONICO Warsaw | 3–2 | ZAKSA Kędzierzyn-Koźle | Torwar Hall, Warsaw; Attendance: 4,230; Referees: Jacek Litwin - Tomasz Flis |
| 20 February 2018; 19:00 | (25–21, 27–25, 20–25, 21–25, 15–11) MVP: Nikola Gjorgiev | | | Torwar Hall, Warsaw; Attendance: 4,230; Referees: Jacek Litwin - Tomasz Flis |

| 7 March 2018; 18:30 | ZAKSA Kędzierzyn-Koźle | – | GKS Katowice | Azoty Hall, Kędzierzyn-Koźle |
| 7 March 2018; 18:30 | MVP: | | | Azoty Hall, Kędzierzyn-Koźle |

| 10 March 2018 | MKS Będzin | – | ZAKSA Kędzierzyn-Koźle | HWS, Sosnowiec |
| 10 March 2018 | MVP: | | | HWS, Sosnowiec |

| 17 March 2018 | ZAKSA Kędzierzyn-Koźle | – | Espadon Szczecin | Azoty Hall, Kędzierzyn-Koźle |
| 17 March 2018 | MVP: | | | Azoty Hall, Kędzierzyn-Koźle |

| 24 March 2018 | Dafi Społem Kielce | – | ZAKSA Kędzierzyn-Koźle | Legionów Hall, Kielce |
| 24 March 2018 | MVP: | | | Legionów Hall, Kielce |

| 30 March 2018 | BBTS Bielsko-Biała | – | ZAKSA Kędzierzyn-Koźle | Azoty Hall, Kędzierzyn-Koźle |
| 30 March 2018 | MVP: | | | Azoty Hall, Kędzierzyn-Koźle |

| 7 April 2018 | ZAKSA Kędzierzyn-Koźle | – | Trefl Gdańsk | Azoty Hall, Kędzierzyn-Koźle |
| 7 April 2018 | MVP: | | | Azoty Hall, Kędzierzyn-Koźle |

| 14 April 2018 | PGE Skra Bełchatów | – | ZAKSA Kędzierzyn-Koźle | Energia Hall, Bełchatów |
| 14 April 2018 | MVP: | | | Energia Hall, Bełchatów |

=== 2017 FIVB Club World Championship ===
==== Pool A ====
| 12 December 2017; 17:30 | ZAKSA Kędzierzyn-Koźle (Poland) | 3–2 | (Iran) Sarmayeh Bank Tehran | Hala Okrąglak, Opole; Attendance: 2,800; Referees: Shaaban N. (EGY) & Muranaka S. (JPN) |
| 12 December 2017; 17:30 | (19–25, 20–25, 25–16, 31–29, 17–15); P2 P3 | | | Hala Okrąglak, Opole; Attendance: 2,800; Referees: Shaaban N. (EGY) & Muranaka S. (JPN) |

| 13 December 2017; 17:30 | ZAKSA Kędzierzyn-Koźle (Poland) | 2–3 | (Italy) Cucine Lube Civitanova | Hala Okrąglak, Opole; Attendance: 3,300; Referees: Muranaka S. (JPN) & Shaaban N. (EGY) |
| 13 December 2017; 17:30 | (25–23, 21–25, 25–23, 21–25, 16–18); P2 P3 | | | Hala Okrąglak, Opole; Attendance: 3,300; Referees: Muranaka S. (JPN) & Shaaban N. (EGY) |

| 14 December 2017; 17:30 | ZAKSA Kędzierzyn-Koźle (Poland) | 0–3 | (Brazil) Sada Cruzeiro | Hala Okrąglak, Opole; Attendance: 3,300; Referees: Shaaban N. (EGY) & Simonovic V. (SRB) |
| 14 December 2017; 17:30 | (13–25, 30–32, 20–25); P2 P3 | | | Hala Okrąglak, Opole; Attendance: 3,300; Referees: Shaaban N. (EGY) & Simonovic V. (SRB) |

=== 2017–18 CEV Champions League ===
==== Pool E ====
| 6 December 2017; 19:00 | Arkas Spor (Turkey) | 0–3 | (Poland) ZAKSA Kędzierzyn-Koźle | İzmir Atatürk Volleyball Hall, İzmir; Attendance: 3,000; Referees: MIKLOSIC Sanja - BENSIMON Roy |
| 6 December 2017; 19:00 | (23–25, 28–30, 23–25) | | | İzmir Atatürk Volleyball Hall, İzmir; Attendance: 3,000; Referees: MIKLOSIC Sanja - BENSIMON Roy |

| 20 December 2017; 20:30 | ZAKSA Kędzierzyn-Koźle (Poland) | 3–2 | (Italy) Trentino Diatec | Azoty Hall, Kędzierzyn-Koźle; Attendance: 2,200; Referees: OLEYNIK Vladimir - NASTASE Lucian-Vasile |
| 20 December 2017; 20:30 | (18–25, 24–26, 25–23, 25–16, 15–12) | | | Azoty Hall, Kędzierzyn-Koźle; Attendance: 2,200; Referees: OLEYNIK Vladimir - NASTASE Lucian-Vasile |

| 17 January 2018; 20:30 | ZAKSA Kędzierzyn-Koźle (Poland) | 3–0 | (Belgium) Noliko Maaseik | Azoty Hall, Kędzierzyn-Koźle; Attendance: 1,500; Referees: FERNANDEZ FUENTES David - KOZLOVA Nadezda |
| 17 January 2018; 20:30 | (25–22, 25–20, 25–18) | | | Azoty Hall, Kędzierzyn-Koźle; Attendance: 1,500; Referees: FERNANDEZ FUENTES David - KOZLOVA Nadezda |

| 30 January 2018; 20:30 | Noliko Maaseik (Belgium) | 3–2 | (Poland) ZAKSA Kędzierzyn-Koźle | Lotto Dôme, Maaseik; Attendance: 2,150; Referees: NEDERHOED Jacobus - STOICA Bogdan Laurentiu |
| 30 January 2018; 20:30 | (26–24, 24–26, 25–20, 22–25, 17–15) | | | Lotto Dôme, Maaseik; Attendance: 2,150; Referees: NEDERHOED Jacobus - STOICA Bogdan Laurentiu |

| 14 February 2018; 20:30 | Trentino Diatec (Italy) | 2–3 | (Poland) ZAKSA Kędzierzyn-Koźle | PalaTrento, Trento; Attendance: 2,543; Referees: MOKRY Juraj - YOVCHEV Konstantin |
| 14 February 2018; 20:30 | (25–23, 22–25, 25–27, 25–21, 15–17) | | | PalaTrento, Trento; Attendance: 2,543; Referees: MOKRY Juraj - YOVCHEV Konstantin |

| 28 February 2018; 18:00 | ZAKSA Kędzierzyn-Koźle (Poland) | 3–0 | (Turkey) Arkas Spor | Azoty Hall, Kędzierzyn-Koźle; Attendance: 1,200; Referees: VINALIEV Aleksandar - ADLER Laszlo |
| 28 February 2018; 18:00 | (25–17, 25–19, 25–23) | | | Azoty Hall, Kędzierzyn-Koźle; Attendance: 1,200; Referees: VINALIEV Aleksandar - ADLER Laszlo |

==== Playoff 12 ====
The draws of the match pairs for the playoffs of 12 were held on March 2, 2018 in Luxembourg. ZAKSA was one of three Polish teams in this phase.

| 14 March 2018; 20:30 | Jastrzębski Węgiel (Poland) | 1–3 | (Poland) ZAKSA Kędzierzyn-Koźle | HWS, Jastrzębie-Zdrój; Attendance: 2,229; Referees: RAPISARDA Daniele - MIKLOSIC Sanja |
| 14 March 2018; 20:30 | (19–25, 19–25, 25–21, 33–35) | | | HWS, Jastrzębie-Zdrój; Attendance: 2,229; Referees: RAPISARDA Daniele - MIKLOSIC Sanja |

| 21 March 2018; 20:00 | ZAKSA Kędzierzyn-Koźle (Poland) | 3–0 | (Poland) Jastrzębski Węgiel | Azoty Hall, Kędzierzyn-Koźle; Attendance: 2,100; Referees: PASQUALI Fabrizio - ARO Kenneth |
| 21 March 2018; 20:00 | (25–21, 25–20, 25–12) | | | Azoty Hall, Kędzierzyn-Koźle; Attendance: 2,100; Referees: PASQUALI Fabrizio - ARO Kenneth |

==== Playoff 6 ====
| 4 April 2018; 20:30 | ZAKSA Kędzierzyn-Koźle (Poland) | 3–2 | (Germany) VfB Friedrichshafen | Azoty Hall, Kędzierzyn-Koźle; Attendance: 1,500; Referees: OLEYNIK Vladimir - PUECHER Andrea |
| 4 April 2018; 20:30 | (25–23, 25–21, 22–25, 22–25, 15–13) | | | Azoty Hall, Kędzierzyn-Koźle; Attendance: 1,500; Referees: OLEYNIK Vladimir - PUECHER Andrea |

| 10 April 2018; 20:00 | VfB Friedrichshafen (Germany) | 0–3 | (Poland) ZAKSA Kędzierzyn-Koźle | ZF-Arena, Friedrichshafen; Attendance: 3,600; Referees: SANTI Simone - SODJA Harald |
| 10 April 2018; 20:00 | (19–25, 18–25, 13–25) | | | ZF-Arena, Friedrichshafen; Attendance: 3,600; Referees: SANTI Simone - SODJA Harald |

==== Semifinal ====
| 12 May 2018 | ZAKSA Kędzierzyn-Koźle (Poland) | – | {{{team2}}} | Basket-Hall Kazan 1, Kazan |
