= 2016–17 ZAKSA Kędzierzyn-Koźle season =

ZAKSA Kędzierzyn-Koźle
2016–17 season
- Chairman: Mirosław Ptasiński
- Manager: Ferdinando De Giorgi

ZAKSA Kędzierzyn-Koźle 2016–2017 season is the 2016/2017 volleyball season for Polish professional volleyball club ZAKSA Kędzierzyn-Koźle.

After achieving title of 2016 Polish Champion in a main players of ZAKSA stayed in team on 2016/17 season: Sam Deroo, Paweł Zatorski, Benjamin Toniutti, Kevin Tillie.

The club competes in:

- Polish Championship
- Polish Cup
- CEV Champions League

== Team roster ==
Head coach:	Ferdinando De Giorgi
Assistant:	Michał Chadała, Oskar Kaczmarczyk

No.	Name	Date of birth	Position
1	(Poland) Paweł Zatorski	June 21, 1990	libero
2	(France) Kévin Tillie	November 2, 1990	outside hitter
3	(Poland) Dominik Witczak	January 2, 1983	opposite
6	(Poland) Dawid Konarski	August 31, 1989	opposite
7	(Poland) Rafał Buszek	April 28, 1987	outside hitter
9	(Poland) Łukasz Wiśniewski	February 3, 1989	middle blocker
10	(Poland) Mateusz Bieniek	April 5, 1994	middle blocker
11	(Poland) Bartosz Jastrowicz	August 8, 1996	outside hitter
12	(Poland) Grzegorz Bociek	June 6, 1991	opposite
13	(Poland) Kamil Semeniuk	July 16, 1996	outside hitter
14	(Poland) Grzegorz Pająk	January 1, 1987	setter
15	(Belgium) Sam Deroo	April 24, 1992	outside hitter
16	(France) Benjamin Toniutti	October 30, 1989	setter
17	(Poland) Aleksander Maziarz	April 22, 1995	middle blocker
18	(Poland) Korneliusz Banach	January 25, 1994	libero
19	(Poland) Patryk Czarnowski	November 1, 1985	middle blocker

== Squad changes for the 2016–2017 season ==
In:

No.	Player	Position	From
3	(Poland) Dominik Witczak	opposite	Asseco Resovia Rzeszów
10	(Poland) Mateusz Bieniek	middle blocker	Effector Kielce
11	(Poland) Bartosz Jastrowicz	outside hitter	ZAKSA Kędzierzyn Koźle U23
17	(Poland) Aleksander Maziarz	middle blocker	AZS PWSZ Nysa

Out:

No.	Player	Position	To
2	(Poland) Krzysztof Rejno	middle blocker	MKS Będzin
8	(Ukraine) Jurij Gladyr	middle blocker	PGE Skra Bełchatów

== Most Valuable Players ==
No.	Player	MVP
1.	Dawid Konarski	9
2.	Sam Deroo	7
3.	Mateusz Bieniek	4
	Benjamin Toniutti	4
5.	Łukasz Wiśniewski	3
6.	Patryk Czarnowski	1
	Grzegorz Pająk	1

== Results, schedules and standings ==
=== 2016–17 PlusLiga ===
==== Regular season ====
30 September 2016; 20:15	Espadon Szczecin	0–3	ZAKSA Kędzierzyn-Koźle	Azoty Arena, Szczecin; Attendance: 4,150; Referees: Sokół Katarzyna - Wolski Zbigniew
30 September 2016; 20:15	(15–25, 11–25, 22–25) MVP: Łukasz Wiśniewski			Azoty Arena, Szczecin; Attendance: 4,150; Referees: Sokół Katarzyna - Wolski Zbigniew

9 October 2016; 14:45	ZAKSA Kędzierzyn-Koźle	1–3	PGE Skra Bełchatów	Azoty Hall, Kędzierzyn-Koźle; Attendance: 3,300; Referees: Dudek Piotr - Gadzina Mariusz
9 October 2016; 14:45	(25–22, 26–28, 24–26, 23–25) MVP: Srecko Lisinac			Azoty Hall, Kędzierzyn-Koźle; Attendance: 3,300; Referees: Dudek Piotr - Gadzina Mariusz

16 October 2016; 14:45	Lotos Trefl Gdańsk	1–3	ZAKSA Kędzierzyn-Koźle	Ergo Arena, Gdańsk; Attendance: 4,600; Referees: Maciejewski Maciej - Makowski Jarosław
16 October 2016; 14:45	(18–25, 25–21, 24–26, 23–25) MVP: Sam Deroo			Ergo Arena, Gdańsk; Attendance: 4,600; Referees: Maciejewski Maciej - Makowski Jarosław

22 October 2016; 14:45	ZAKSA Kędzierzyn-Koźle	3–0	Cuprum Lubin	Azoty Hall, Kędzierzyn-Koźle; Attendance: 2,150; Referees: Maroszek Wojciech - Niedbał Anna
22 October 2016; 14:45	(25–21, 25–19, 25–16) MVP: Mateusz Bieniek			Azoty Hall, Kędzierzyn-Koźle; Attendance: 2,150; Referees: Maroszek Wojciech - Niedbał Anna

26 October 2016; 20:30	Cerrad Czarni Radom	1–3	ZAKSA Kędzierzyn-Koźle	MOSiR Hall, Radom; Attendance: 1,600; Referees: Gadzina Mariusz - Dudek Piotr
26 October 2016; 20:30	(22–25, 20–25, 25–23, 19–25) MVP: Dawid Konarski			MOSiR Hall, Radom; Attendance: 1,600; Referees: Gadzina Mariusz - Dudek Piotr

29 October 2016; 20:00	ZAKSA Kędzierzyn-Koźle	3–2	Jastrzębski Węgiel	Azoty Hall, Kędzierzyn-Koźle; Attendance: 2,800; Referees: Broński Jacek - Michlic Agnieszka
29 October 2016; 20:00	(25–21, 20–25, 25–16, 25–27, 22–20) MVP: Dawid Konarski			Azoty Hall, Kędzierzyn-Koźle; Attendance: 2,800; Referees: Broński Jacek - Michlic Agnieszka

5 November 2016; 20:00	GKS Katowice	0–3	ZAKSA Kędzierzyn-Koźle	Szopienice Hall, Katowice; Attendance: 1,500; Referees: Herbik Marcin - Niewiarowska Magdalena
5 November 2016; 20:00	(26–28, 16–25, 20–25) MVP: Sam Deroo			Szopienice Hall, Katowice; Attendance: 1,500; Referees: Herbik Marcin - Niewiarowska Magdalena

12 November 2016; 17:00	ZAKSA Kędzierzyn-Koźle	3–1	Łuczniczka Bydgoszcz	Azoty Hall, Kędzierzyn-Koźle; Attendance: 2,450; Referees: Heyducki Marek - Skowroński Piotr
12 November 2016; 17:00	(26–24, 25–18, 19–25, 25–15) MVP: Dawid Konarski			Azoty Hall, Kędzierzyn-Koźle; Attendance: 2,450; Referees: Heyducki Marek - Skowroński Piotr

18 November 2016; 20:15	Indykpol AZS Olsztyn	0–3	ZAKSA Kędzierzyn-Koźle	Urania Hall, Olsztyn; Attendance: 2,400; Referees: Budzik Marek - Król Piotr
18 November 2016; 20:15	(19–25, 16–25, 21–25) MVP: Dawid Konarski			Urania Hall, Olsztyn; Attendance: 2,400; Referees: Budzik Marek - Król Piotr

26 November 2016; 17:00	ZAKSA Kędzierzyn-Koźle	3–0	AZS Częstochowa	Azoty Hall, Kędzierzyn-Koźle; Attendance: 2,200; Referees: Janik Tomasz - Niewiarowska Magdalena
26 November 2016; 17:00	(25–11, 25–21, 25–19) MVP: Mateusz Bieniek			Azoty Hall, Kędzierzyn-Koźle; Attendance: 2,200; Referees: Janik Tomasz - Niewiarowska Magdalena

30 November 2016; 18:00	BBTS Bielsko-Biała	0–3	ZAKSA Kędzierzyn-Koźle	Dębowiec Sports Arena, Bielsko-Biała; Attendance: 1,000; Referees: Broński Jacek - Michlic Agnieszka
30 November 2016; 18:00	(15–25, 17–25, 15–25) MVP: Patryk Czarnowski			Dębowiec Sports Arena, Bielsko-Biała; Attendance: 1,000; Referees: Broński Jacek - Michlic Agnieszka

3 December 2016; 16:30	ZAKSA Kędzierzyn-Koźle	3–0	Effector Kielce	Azoty Hall, Kędzierzyn-Koźle; Attendance: 2,650; Referees: Kuchna Andrzej - Lagierski Marek
3 December 2016; 16:30	(28–26, 25–18, 25–21) MVP: Mateusz Bieniek			Azoty Hall, Kędzierzyn-Koźle; Attendance: 2,650; Referees: Kuchna Andrzej - Lagierski Marek

9 December 2016; 18:00	MKS Będzin	0–3	ZAKSA Kędzierzyn-Koźle	Hala Widowiskowo Sportowa, Sosnowiec; Attendance: 1,400; Referees: Twardowski Maciej - Gadzina Mariusz
9 December 2016; 18:00	(18–25, 16–25, 16–25) MVP: Benjamin Toniutti			Hala Widowiskowo Sportowa, Sosnowiec; Attendance: 1,400; Referees: Twardowski Maciej - Gadzina Mariusz

14 December 2016; 20:30	ONICO AZS Politechnika Warszawska	0–3	ZAKSA Kędzierzyn-Koźle	Torwar Hall, Warsaw; Attendance: 4,200; Referees: Budzik Marek - Maroszek Wojciech
14 December 2016; 20:30	(13–25, 21–25, 21–25) MVP: Dawid Konarski			Torwar Hall, Warsaw; Attendance: 4,200; Referees: Budzik Marek - Maroszek Wojciech

17 December 2016; 14:45	ZAKSA Kędzierzyn-Koźle	2–3	Asseco Resovia Rzeszów	Azoty Hall, Kędzierzyn-Koźle; Attendance: 3,000; Referees: Król Piotr - Burkiewicz Paweł
17 December 2016; 14:45	(23–25, 25–18, 25–18, 18–25, 13–15) MVP: Marko Ivović			Azoty Hall, Kędzierzyn-Koźle; Attendance: 3,000; Referees: Król Piotr - Burkiewicz Paweł

30 December 2016; 18:00	ZAKSA Kędzierzyn-Koźle	3–0	Espadon Szczecin	Azoty Hall, Kędzierzyn-Koźle; Attendance: 2,650; Referees: Dudek Piotr - Burkiewicz Paweł
30 December 2016; 18:00	(25–18, 25–12, 25–22) MVP: Mateusz Bieniek			Azoty Hall, Kędzierzyn-Koźle; Attendance: 2,650; Referees: Dudek Piotr - Burkiewicz Paweł

7 January 2017; 14:45	PGE Skra Bełchatów	3–2	ZAKSA Kędzierzyn-Koźle	Energia Hall, Bełchatów; Attendance: 2,700; Referees: Herbik Marcin - Janik Tomasz
7 January 2017; 14:45	(23–25, 19–25, 25–18, 25–20, 15–9) MVP: Mariusz Wlazły			Energia Hall, Bełchatów; Attendance: 2,700; Referees: Herbik Marcin - Janik Tomasz

28 January 2017; 20:00	ZAKSA Kędzierzyn-Koźle	3–0	Lotos Trefl Gdańsk	Azoty Hall, Kędzierzyn-Koźle; Attendance: 2,255; Referees: Pindral Szymon - Litwin Jacek
28 January 2017; 20:00	(25–22, 25–15, 25–16) MVP: Łukasz Wiśniewski			Azoty Hall, Kędzierzyn-Koźle; Attendance: 2,255; Referees: Pindral Szymon - Litwin Jacek

24 January 2017; 18:00	Cuprum Lubin	1–3	ZAKSA Kędzierzyn-Koźle	HWS RCS, Lubin; Attendance: 2,745; Referees: Twardowski Maciej - Pindral Szymon
24 January 2017; 18:00	(17–25, 25–19, 23–25, 19–25) MVP: Sam Deroo			HWS RCS, Lubin; Attendance: 2,745; Referees: Twardowski Maciej - Pindral Szymon

4 February 2017; 17:00	ZAKSA Kędzierzyn-Koźle	3–2	Cerrad Czarni Radom	Azoty Hall, Kędzierzyn-Koźle; Attendance: 1,800; Referees: Kolendowski Maciej - Flis Tomasz
4 February 2017; 17:00	(21–25, 26–24, 17–25, 25–19, 19–17) MVP: Sam Deroo			Azoty Hall, Kędzierzyn-Koźle; Attendance: 1,800; Referees: Kolendowski Maciej - Flis Tomasz

10 February 2017; 18:00	Jastrzębski Węgiel	2–3	ZAKSA Kędzierzyn-Koźle	Hala Sportowa, Jastrzębie-Zdrój; Attendance: 3,112; Referees: Gadzina Mariusz - Flis Tomasz
10 February 2017; 18:00	(25–23, 25–23, 19–25, 18–25, 11–15) MVP: Łukasz Wiśniewski			Hala Sportowa, Jastrzębie-Zdrój; Attendance: 3,112; Referees: Gadzina Mariusz - Flis Tomasz

18 February 2017; 17:00	ZAKSA Kędzierzyn-Koźle	3–0	GKS Katowice	Azoty Hall, Kędzierzyn-Koźle; Attendance: 1,740; Referees: Niewiarowska Magdalena - Niedbał Anna
18 February 2017; 17:00	(30–28, 32–30, 31–29) MVP: Dawid Konarski			Azoty Hall, Kędzierzyn-Koźle; Attendance: 1,740; Referees: Niewiarowska Magdalena - Niedbał Anna

22 February 2017; 18:00	Łuczniczka Bydgoszcz	0–3	ZAKSA Kędzierzyn-Koźle	Łuczniczka, Bydgoszcz; Attendance: 3,050; Referees: Makowski Jarosław - Maciejewski Maciej
22 February 2017; 18:00	(23–25, 16–25, 22–25) MVP: Benjamin Toniutti			Łuczniczka, Bydgoszcz; Attendance: 3,050; Referees: Makowski Jarosław - Maciejewski Maciej

25 February 2017; 14:45	ZAKSA Kędzierzyn-Koźle	3–1	Indykpol AZS Olsztyn	Azoty Hall, Kędzierzyn-Koźle; Attendance: 2,250; Referees: Maciejewski Maciej - Makowski Jarosław
25 February 2017; 14:45	(21–25, 25–21, 25–21, 25–22) MVP: Benjamin Toniutti			Azoty Hall, Kędzierzyn-Koźle; Attendance: 2,250; Referees: Maciejewski Maciej - Makowski Jarosław

6 March 2017; 18:00	AZS Częstochowa	0–3	ZAKSA Kędzierzyn-Koźle	Hala Sportowa Częstochowa, Częstochowa; Attendance: 1,00; Referees: Makowski Jarosław - Maciejewski Maciej
6 March 2017; 18:00	(15–25, 16–25, 20–25) MVP: Grzegorz Pająk			Hala Sportowa Częstochowa, Częstochowa; Attendance: 1,00; Referees: Makowski Jarosław - Maciejewski Maciej

8 March 2017; 18:00	ZAKSA Kędzierzyn-Koźle	3–0	BBTS Bielsko-Biała	Azoty Hall, Kędzierzyn-Koźle; Attendance: 2,300; Referees: Gadzina Mariusz - Twardowski Maciej
8 March 2017; 18:00	(25–22, 25–9, 25–20) MVP: Sam Deroo			Azoty Hall, Kędzierzyn-Koźle; Attendance: 2,300; Referees: Gadzina Mariusz - Twardowski Maciej

12 March 2017; 17:00	Effector Kielce	0–3	ZAKSA Kędzierzyn-Koźle	Legionów Hall, Kielce; Attendance: 3,100; Referees: Litwin Jacek - Burkiewicz Paweł
12 March 2017; 17:00	(19–25, 19–25, 15–25) MVP: Sam Deroo			Legionów Hall, Kielce; Attendance: 3,100; Referees: Litwin Jacek - Burkiewicz Paweł

19 March 2017; 17:00	ZAKSA Kędzierzyn-Koźle	3–1	MKS Będzin	Azoty Hall, Kędzierzyn-Koźle; Attendance: 2,300; Referees: Wolski Zbigniew - Sokół Katarzyna
19 March 2017; 17:00	(28–30, 25–18, 25–13, 27–25) MVP: Dawid Konarski			Azoty Hall, Kędzierzyn-Koźle; Attendance: 2,300; Referees: Wolski Zbigniew - Sokół Katarzyna

26 March 2017; 18:00	ZAKSA Kędzierzyn-Koźle	3–0	ONICO AZS Politechnika Warszawska	Azoty Hall, Kędzierzyn-Koźle; Attendance: 1,300; Referees: Lagierski Marek - Niemczura Waldemar
26 March 2017; 18:00	(25–22, 25–16, 25–12) MVP: Sam Deroo			Azoty Hall, Kędzierzyn-Koźle; Attendance: 1,300; Referees: Lagierski Marek - Niemczura Waldemar

1 April 2017; 20:00	Asseco Resovia Rzeszów	3–0	ZAKSA Kędzierzyn-Koźle	Podpromie Hall, Rzeszów; Attendance: 4,300; Referees: Maroszek Wojciech - Lagierski Marek
1 April 2017; 20:00	(25–21, 25–22, 25–19) MVP: Jochen Schops			Podpromie Hall, Rzeszów; Attendance: 4,300; Referees: Maroszek Wojciech - Lagierski Marek

==== Semifinal ====
7 April 2017; 17:30	Jastrzębski Węgiel	0–3	ZAKSA Kędzierzyn-Koźle	Hala Sportowa, Jastrzębie-Zdrój; Attendance: 3,112; Referees: Burkiewicz Paweł - Kolendowski Maciej
7 April 2017; 17:30	(23–25, 20–25, 19–25) MVP: Sam Deroo			Hala Sportowa, Jastrzębie-Zdrój; Attendance: 3,112; Referees: Burkiewicz Paweł - Kolendowski Maciej

12 April 2017; 18:00	ZAKSA Kędzierzyn-Koźle	3–0	Jastrzębski Węgiel	Azoty Hall, Kędzierzyn-Koźle; Attendance: 3,000; Referees: Herbik Marcin - Janik Tomasz
12 April 2017; 18:00	(25–19, 25–17, 25–20) MVP: Dawid Konarski			Azoty Hall, Kędzierzyn-Koźle; Attendance: 3,000; Referees: Herbik Marcin - Janik Tomasz

==== Final ====
19 April 2017; 18:00	PGE Skra Bełchatów	0–3	ZAKSA Kędzierzyn-Koźle	Atlas Arena, Łódź; Attendance: 9,592; Referees: Maroszek Wojciech - Lagierski Marek
19 April 2017; 18:00	(25–27, 21–25, 19–25) MVP: Dawid Konarski			Atlas Arena, Łódź; Attendance: 9,592; Referees: Maroszek Wojciech - Lagierski Marek

23 April 2017; 20:30	ZAKSA Kędzierzyn-Koźle	3–1	PGE Skra Bełchatów	Azoty Hall, Kędzierzyn-Koźle; Attendance: 3,375; Referees: Burkiewicz Paweł - Twardowski Maciej
23 April 2017; 20:30	(21–25, 25–23, 27–25, 25–18) MVP: Benjamin Toniutti			Azoty Hall, Kędzierzyn-Koźle; Attendance: 3,375; Referees: Burkiewicz Paweł - Twardowski Maciej

=== 2016–17 CEV Champions League ===
==== Pool A ====
6 December 2016; 18:00	ZAKSA Kędzierzyn-Koźle (Poland)	3–0	(Turkey) İstanbul Büyükşehir Belediyesi	Azoty Hall, Kędzierzyn-Koźle; Attendance: 1,850; Referees: SANTI Simone - GEROTHODOROS Epaminondas
6 December 2016; 18:00	(25–12, 28–26, 29–27)			Azoty Hall, Kędzierzyn-Koźle; Attendance: 1,850; Referees: SANTI Simone - GEROTHODOROS Epaminondas

21 December 2016; 20:30	Noliko Maaseik (Belgium)	0–3	(Poland) ZAKSA Kędzierzyn-Koźle	Lotto Dôme, Maaseik; Attendance: 1,750; Referees: BARNSTORF Ralph - ALIYEV Eldar
21 December 2016; 20:30	(23–25, 22–25, 21–25)			Lotto Dôme, Maaseik; Attendance: 1,750; Referees: BARNSTORF Ralph - ALIYEV Eldar

18 January 2017; 19:00	Dinamo Moscow (Russia)	1–3	(Poland) ZAKSA Kędzierzyn-Koźle	Dynamo Sports Palace, Moscow; Attendance: 2,600; Referees: ARO Kenneth - SALTALIPPI Fabrizio
18 January 2017; 19:00	(23–25, 21–25, 30–28, 20–25)			Dynamo Sports Palace, Moscow; Attendance: 2,600; Referees: ARO Kenneth - SALTALIPPI Fabrizio

31 January 2017; 18:00	ZAKSA Kędzierzyn-Koźle (Poland)	3–1	(Russia) Dinamo Moscow	Azoty Hall, Kędzierzyn-Koźle; Attendance: 3,000; Referees: GONCALVES Vitor Alexandre - KOIV Tiit
31 January 2017; 18:00	(25–17, 25–22, 27–29, 25–21)			Azoty Hall, Kędzierzyn-Koźle; Attendance: 3,000; Referees: GONCALVES Vitor Alexandre - KOIV Tiit

14 February 2017; 18:00	ZAKSA Kędzierzyn-Koźle (Poland)	3–0	(Belgium) Noliko Maaseik	Azoty Hall, Kędzierzyn-Koźle
14 February 2017; 18:00	(25–23, 25–19, 25–21)			Azoty Hall, Kędzierzyn-Koźle

1 March 2017; 18:00	İstanbul Büyükşehir Belediyesi (Turkey)	3–1	(Poland) ZAKSA Kędzierzyn-Koźle	Haldun Alagaş Sports Hall, Istanbul; Attendance: 200; Referees: RYCHLIK Dusan - MATEIZER Alin
1 March 2017; 18:00	(25–23, 16–25, 25–22, 26–24)			Haldun Alagaş Sports Hall, Istanbul; Attendance: 200; Referees: RYCHLIK Dusan - MATEIZER Alin

==== Playoff 12 ====
15 March 2017; 19:00	Belogorie Belgorod (Russia)	3–1	(Poland) ZAKSA Kędzierzyn-Koźle	Sports Palace Cosmos, Belgorod; Attendance: 4,200; Referees: AKINCI Erdal - ZULFUGAROV Eldar
15 March 2017; 19:00	(13–25, 25–21, 25–23, 25–20)			Sports Palace Cosmos, Belgorod; Attendance: 4,200; Referees: AKINCI Erdal - ZULFUGAROV Eldar

22 March 2017; 18:00	ZAKSA Kędzierzyn-Koźle (Poland)	1–3	(Russia) Belogorie Belgorod	Azoty Hall, Kędzierzyn-Koźle; Attendance: 2,700; Referees: PASQUALI Fabrizio - THEMELIS Michail
22 March 2017; 18:00	(22–25, 25–20, 24–26, 21–25)			Azoty Hall, Kędzierzyn-Koźle; Attendance: 2,700; Referees: PASQUALI Fabrizio - THEMELIS Michail
