= 2015–16 Asseco Resovia Rzeszów season =

Asseco Resovia Rzeszów
2015–16 season
- Chairman: Marek Panek
- Manager: Andrzej Kowal

Asseco Resovia Rzeszów 2015–2016 season is the 2015/2016 volleyball season for Polish professional volleyball club Asseco Resovia Rzeszów.

The club competes in:

- Polish Championship
- Polish Cup
- Polish SuperCup
- CEV Champions League

== Team Roster Season 2015-2016 ==
Head coach: (Poland) Andrzej Kowal

No.	Name	Date of birth	Position
1	(Poland) Bartosz Kurek	August 29, 1988 (age 36)	opposite
2	(United States) Thomas Jaeschke	September 4, 1993 (age 31)	outside hitter
3	(Poland) Dominik Witczak	January 2, 1983 (age 42)	opposite
4	(Poland) Piotr Nowakowski	December 18, 1987 (age 37)	middle blocker
5	(Czech Republic) Lukáš Ticháček	January 12, 1982 (age 43)	setter
6	(Poland) Dawid Dryja	July 21, 1992 (age 32)	middle blocker
7	(Belarus) (Poland) Olieg Achrem (C)	March 12, 1983 (age 42)	outside hitter
8	(France) Julien Lyneel	April 15, 1990 (age 34)	outside hitter
9	(Ukraine) Dmytro Pashytskyy	November 29, 1987 (age 37)	middle blocker
10	(Germany) Jochen Schöps	October 8, 1983 (age 41)	opposite
11	(Poland) Fabian Drzyzga	January 3, 1990 (age 35)	setter
12	(Poland) Łukasz Perłowski	April 3, 1984 (age 40)	middle blocker
14	(Poland) Aleksander Śliwka	May 24, 1995 (age 29)	outside hitter
16	(Poland) Krzysztof Ignaczak	May 15, 1978 (age 46)	libero
17	(Bulgaria) Nikolay Penchev	May 22, 1992 (age 32)	outside hitter
18	(Poland) Damian Wojtaszek	September 7, 1988 (age 36)	libero
19	(United States) Russell Holmes	July 1, 1982 (age 42)	middle blocker

== Squad changes for the 2014–2015 season ==
In:

No.	Player	Position	From
1	(Poland) Bartosz Kurek	opposite	Cucine Lube Civitanova
2	(United States) Thomas Jaeschke	outside hitter	Loyola Ramblers
8	(France) Julien Lyneel	outside hitter	Montpellier UC
9	(Ukraine) Dmytro Pashytskyy	middle blocker	Cuprum Lubin
14	(Poland) Aleksander Śliwka	outside hitter	AZS Politechnika Warszawska
18	(Poland) Damian Wojtaszek	libero	Jastrzębski Węgiel
20	(Poland) Dominik Witczak	opposite	ZAKSA Kędzierzyn-Koźle

Out:

No.	Player	Position	To
2	(United States) Paul Lotman	outside hitter	Berlin Recycling Volleys
3	(Poland) Michał Żurek	libero	Transfer Bydgoszcz
6	(Poland) Dawid Konarski	opposite	ZAKSA Kędzierzyn-Koźle
8	(Serbia) Marko Ivović	outside hitter	Belogorie Belgorod
14	(Poland) Rafał Buszek	outside hitter	ZAKSA Kędzierzyn-Koźle

== Most Valuable Players ==
=== PlusLiga ===
==== General classification ====
No.	Player	MVP
1.	(Ukraine) Dmytro Pashytskyy	5
2.	(Poland) Bartosz Kurek	4
3.	(Belarus) (Poland) Olieg Achrem	2
	(Poland) Krzysztof Ignaczak	2
5.	(United States) Thomas Jaeschke	1
	(Bulgaria) Nikolay Penchev	1
	(Czech Republic) Lukáš Ticháček	1
	(Poland) Aleksander Śliwka	1
	(Poland) Fabian Drzyzga	1

== Results, schedules and standings ==
=== 2015 Polish SuperCup ===
28 October 2015; 20:30	Asseco Resovia Rzeszów	2–3	Lotos Trefl Gdańsk	HWS Arena, Poznań; Attendance: 4,852; Referees: Kobienia Waldemar - Ignatowicz Paweł
28 October 2015; 20:30	(23–25, 18–25, 25–23, 25–22, 12–15)			HWS Arena, Poznań; Attendance: 4,852; Referees: Kobienia Waldemar - Ignatowicz Paweł

=== 2015–16 PlusLiga ===
==== Regular season ====
30 October 2015; 18:00	AZS Częstochowa	1–3	Asseco Resovia Rzeszów	Hala Sportowa 'Częstochowa', Częstochowa; Attendance: 3,000; Referees: Kolendowski Maciej - Litwin Jacek
30 October 2015; 18:00	(27–25, 22–25, 21–25, 19–25) MVP: Aleksander Śliwka			Hala Sportowa 'Częstochowa', Częstochowa; Attendance: 3,000; Referees: Kolendowski Maciej - Litwin Jacek

7 November 2015; 17:00	Asseco Resovia Rzeszów	3–0	BBTS Bielsko-Biała	Podpromie Hall, Rzeszów; Attendance: 4,200; Referees: Ignatowicz Paweł - Kobienia Waldemar
7 November 2015; 17:00	(25–21, 25–17, 25–18) MVP: Bartosz Kurek			Podpromie Hall, Rzeszów; Attendance: 4,200; Referees: Ignatowicz Paweł - Kobienia Waldemar

11 November 2015; 14:45	PGE Skra Bełchatów	1–3	Asseco Resovia Rzeszów	Energia Hall, Bełchatów; Attendance: 2,700; Referees: Lagierski Marek - Maroszek Wojciech
11 November 2015; 14:45	(21–25, 25–16, 20–25, 22–25) MVP: Bartosz Kurek			Energia Hall, Bełchatów; Attendance: 2,700; Referees: Lagierski Marek - Maroszek Wojciech

14 November 2015; 18:00	Asseco Resovia Rzeszów	2–3	Jastrzębski Węgiel	Podpromie Hall, Rzeszów; Attendance: 4,400; Referees: Twardowski Maciej - Litwin Jacek
14 November 2015; 18:00	(22–25, 25–14, 25–20, 21–25, 9–15) MVP: Maciej Muzaj			Podpromie Hall, Rzeszów; Attendance: 4,400; Referees: Twardowski Maciej - Litwin Jacek

21 November 2015; 20:00	Łuczniczka Bydgoszcz	1–3	Asseco Resovia Rzeszów	Łuczniczka, Bydgoszcz; Attendance: 4,530; Referees: Heyducki Marek - Skowroński Piotr
21 November 2015; 20:00	(25–23, 20–25, 27–29, 23–25) MVP: Bartosz Kurek			Łuczniczka, Bydgoszcz; Attendance: 4,530; Referees: Heyducki Marek - Skowroński Piotr

25 November 2015; 20:30	Asseco Resovia Rzeszów	1–3	ZAKSA Kędzierzyn-Koźle	Podpromie Hall, Rzeszów; Attendance: 4,300; Referees: Herbik Marcin - Janik Tomasz
25 November 2015; 20:30	(25–21, 20–25, 25–27, 24–26) MVP: Benjamin Toniutti			Podpromie Hall, Rzeszów; Attendance: 4,300; Referees: Herbik Marcin - Janik Tomasz

29 November 2015; 20:00	Asseco Resovia Rzeszów	2–3	Cuprum Lubin	Podpromie Hall, Rzeszów; Attendance: 4,100; Referees: Budzik Marek - Kuchna Andrzej
29 November 2015; 20:00	(25–19, 21–25, 26–24, 22–25, 10–15) MVP: Marcus Bohme			Podpromie Hall, Rzeszów; Attendance: 4,100; Referees: Budzik Marek - Kuchna Andrzej

5 December 2015; 17:00	Asseco Resovia Rzeszów	2–3	AZS Politechnika Warszawska	Podpromie Hall, Rzeszów; Attendance: 4,178; Referees: Kolendowski Maciej - Flis Tomasz
5 December 2015; 17:00	(24–26, 21–25, 25–22, 25–19, 14–16) MVP: Guillaume Samica			Podpromie Hall, Rzeszów; Attendance: 4,178; Referees: Kolendowski Maciej - Flis Tomasz

8 December 2015; 20:30	Cerrad Czarni Radom	3–2	Asseco Resovia Rzeszów	Hala MOSiR, Radom; Attendance: 1,500; Referees: Skowroński Piotr - Makowski Jarosław
8 December 2015; 20:30	(27–25, 21–25, 18–25, 27–25, 15–10) MVP: Wojciech Żaliński			Hala MOSiR, Radom; Attendance: 1,500; Referees: Skowroński Piotr - Makowski Jarosław

12 December 2015; 17:00	Asseco Resovia Rzeszów	3–2	Indykpol AZS Olsztyn	Podpromie Hall, Rzeszów; Attendance: 4,200; Referees: Kuchna Andrzej - Maroszek Wojciech
12 December 2015; 17:00	(22–25, 17–25, 25–17, 25–12, 15–10) MVP: Olieg Achrem			Podpromie Hall, Rzeszów; Attendance: 4,200; Referees: Kuchna Andrzej - Maroszek Wojciech

20 December 2015; 17:00	MKS Będzin	0–3	Asseco Resovia Rzeszów	Hala Widowiskowo-Sportowa, Sosnowiec; Attendance: 1,400; Referees: Heyducki Marek - Janik Tomasz
20 December 2015; 17:00	(12–25, 16–25, 19–25) MVP: Nikolay Penchev			Hala Widowiskowo-Sportowa, Sosnowiec; Attendance: 1,400; Referees: Heyducki Marek - Janik Tomasz

13 January 2016; 18:00	Asseco Resovia Rzeszów	3–1	Effector Kielce	Podpromie Hall, Rzeszów; Attendance: 3,800; Referees: Niemczura Waldemar - Król Piotr
13 January 2016; 18:00	(25–20, 25–18, 23–25, 25–21) MVP: Dmytro Pashytskyy			Podpromie Hall, Rzeszów; Attendance: 3,800; Referees: Niemczura Waldemar - Król Piotr

16 January 2016; 14:45	Asseco Resovia Rzeszów	3–0	Lotos Trefl Gdańsk	Podpromie Hall, Rzeszów; Attendance: 4,300; Referees: Król Piotr - Kuchna Andrzej
16 January 2016; 14:45	(25–22, 28–26, 25–20) MVP: Thomas Jaeschke			Podpromie Hall, Rzeszów; Attendance: 4,300; Referees: Król Piotr - Kuchna Andrzej

23 January 2016; 17:00	Asseco Resovia Rzeszów	3–0	AZS Częstochowa	Podpromie Hall, Rzeszów; Attendance: 3,928; Referees: Twardowski Maciej - Kolendowski Maciej
23 January 2016; 17:00	(25–17, 25–12, 25–18) MVP: Olieg Achrem			Podpromie Hall, Rzeszów; Attendance: 3,928; Referees: Twardowski Maciej - Kolendowski Maciej

30 January 2016; 17:00	BBTS Bielsko-Biała	0–3	Asseco Resovia Rzeszów	Dębowiec Sports Arena, Bielsko-Biała; Attendance: 2,600; Referees: Wolski Zbigniew - Sokół Katarzyna
30 January 2016; 17:00	(19–25, 23–25, 25–27) MVP: Dmytro Pashytskyy			Dębowiec Sports Arena, Bielsko-Biała; Attendance: 2,600; Referees: Wolski Zbigniew - Sokół Katarzyna

10 February 2016; 18:00	Asseco Resovia Rzeszów	2–3	PGE Skra Bełchatów	Podpromie Hall, Rzeszów; Attendance: 4,300; Referees: Maroszek Wojciech - Kuchna Andrzej
10 February 2016; 18:00	(22–25, 29–31, 26–24, 25–23, 13–15) MVP: Mariusz Wlazły			Podpromie Hall, Rzeszów; Attendance: 4,300; Referees: Maroszek Wojciech - Kuchna Andrzej

13 February 2016; 20:00	Jastrzębski Węgiel	0–3	Asseco Resovia Rzeszów	Hala Sportowa, Jastrzębie-Zdrój; Attendance: 3,000; Referees: Twardowski Maciej - Pindral Szymon
13 February 2016; 20:00	(15–25, 15–25, 14–25) MVP: Lukáš Ticháček			Hala Sportowa, Jastrzębie-Zdrój; Attendance: 3,000; Referees: Twardowski Maciej - Pindral Szymon

20 February 2016; 20:00	Asseco Resovia Rzeszów	3–0	Łuczniczka Bydgoszcz	Podpromie Hall, Rzeszów; Attendance: 4,304; Referees: Burkiewicz Paweł - Litwin Jacek
20 February 2016; 20:00	(25–22, 25–18, 25–21) MVP: Krzysztof Ignaczak			Podpromie Hall, Rzeszów; Attendance: 4,304; Referees: Burkiewicz Paweł - Litwin Jacek

24 February 2016; 20:30	ZAKSA Kędzierzyn-Koźle	3–1	Asseco Resovia Rzeszów	Azoty Hall, Kędzierzyn-Koźle; Attendance: 3,380; Referees: Burkiewicz Paweł - Twardowski Maciej
24 February 2016; 20:30	(22–25, 25–19, 25–22, 25–21) MVP: Kevin Tillie			Azoty Hall, Kędzierzyn-Koźle; Attendance: 3,380; Referees: Burkiewicz Paweł - Twardowski Maciej

27 February 2016; 14:45	Cuprum Lubin	3–0	Asseco Resovia Rzeszów	HWS RCS, Lubin; Attendance: 3,430; Referees: Maroszek Wojciech - Budzik Marek
27 February 2016; 14:45	(25–22, 32–30, 25–23) MVP: Robert Täht			HWS RCS, Lubin; Attendance: 3,430; Referees: Maroszek Wojciech - Budzik Marek

6 March 2016; 19:00	AZS Politechnika Warszawska	1–3	Asseco Resovia Rzeszów	Torwar Hall, Warsaw; Attendance: 4,300; Referees: Skowroński Piotr - Heyducki Marek
6 March 2016; 19:00	(18–25, 25–21, 23–25, 18–25) MVP: Dmytro Pashytskyy			Torwar Hall, Warsaw; Attendance: 4,300; Referees: Skowroński Piotr - Heyducki Marek

11 March 2016; 17:00	Asseco Resovia Rzeszów	3–1	Cerrad Czarni Radom	Podpromie Hall, Rzeszów; Attendance: 4,300; Referees: Niemczura Waldemar - Sokół Katarzyna
11 March 2016; 17:00	(25–19, 23–25, 25–22, 25–20) MVP: Bartosz Kurek			Podpromie Hall, Rzeszów; Attendance: 4,300; Referees: Niemczura Waldemar - Sokół Katarzyna

16 March 2016; 20:30	Indykpol AZS Olsztyn	0–3	Asseco Resovia Rzeszów	Urania Hall, Olsztyn; Attendance: 1,800; Referees: Sokół Katarzyna - Wolski Zbigniew
16 March 2016; 20:30	(23–25, 17–25, 17–25) MVP: Dmytro Pashytskyy			Urania Hall, Olsztyn; Attendance: 1,800; Referees: Sokół Katarzyna - Wolski Zbigniew

31 March 2016; 18:00	Asseco Resovia Rzeszów	3–1	MKS Będzin	Podpromie Hall, Rzeszów; Attendance: 4,207; Referees: Twardowski Maciej - Pindral Szymon
31 March 2016; 18:00	(25–19, 23–25, 25–18, 25–18) MVP: Krzysztof Ignaczak			Podpromie Hall, Rzeszów; Attendance: 4,207; Referees: Twardowski Maciej - Pindral Szymon

23 March 2016; 20:30	Effector Kielce	0–3	Asseco Resovia Rzeszów	Legionów Hal, Kielce; Attendance: 3,300; Referees: Maroszek Wojciech - Król Piotr
23 March 2016; 20:30	(18–25, 16–25, 14–25) MVP: Dmytro Pashytskyy			Legionów Hal, Kielce; Attendance: 3,300; Referees: Maroszek Wojciech - Król Piotr

6 April 2016; 20:30	Lotos Trefl Gdańsk	0–3	Asseco Resovia Rzeszów	Ergo Arena, Gdańsk; Attendance: 5,180; Referees: Burkiewicz Paweł - Flis Tomasz
6 April 2016; 20:30	(23–25, 20–25, 20–25) MVP: Fabian Drzyzga			Ergo Arena, Gdańsk; Attendance: 5,180; Referees: Burkiewicz Paweł - Flis Tomasz

==== Final round (for gold medal) ====
21 April 2016; 20:30	ZAKSA Kędzierzyn-Koźle	3–0	Asseco Resovia Rzeszów	Azoty Hall, Kędzierzyn-Koźle; Attendance: 3,500; Referees: Maroszek Wojciech - Kuchna Andrzej
21 April 2016; 20:30	(25–20, 25–14, 25–18) MVP: Sam Deroo			Azoty Hall, Kędzierzyn-Koźle; Attendance: 3,500; Referees: Maroszek Wojciech - Kuchna Andrzej

22 April 2016; 20:30	ZAKSA Kędzierzyn-Koźle	3–0	Asseco Resovia Rzeszów	Azoty Hall, Kędzierzyn-Koźle; Attendance: 3,500; Referees: Burkiewicz Paweł - Kolendowski Maciej
22 April 2016; 20:30	(25–18, 25–19, 25–21) MVP: Jurij Gladyr			Azoty Hall, Kędzierzyn-Koźle; Attendance: 3,500; Referees: Burkiewicz Paweł - Kolendowski Maciej

26 April 2016; 20:30	Asseco Resovia Rzeszów	0–3	ZAKSA Kędzierzyn-Koźle	Podpromie Hall, Rzeszów; Attendance: 4,300; Referees: Twardowski Maciej - Pindral Szymon
26 April 2016; 20:30	(23–25, 21–25, 13–25) MVP: Benjamin Toniutti			Podpromie Hall, Rzeszów; Attendance: 4,300; Referees: Twardowski Maciej - Pindral Szymon

=== 2015–16 Polish Cup ===
==== Quarterfinal ====
5 February 2016; 18:00	GKS Katowice	0–3	Asseco Resovia Rzeszów	Hala Orbita, Wrocław; Attendance: 1,500; Referees: Sokół Katarzyna - Wolski Zbigniew
5 February 2016; 18:00	(14–25, 19–25, 20–25)			Hala Orbita, Wrocław; Attendance: 1,500; Referees: Sokół Katarzyna - Wolski Zbigniew

==== Semifinal ====
6 February 2016; 18:00	Asseco Resovia Rzeszów	1–3	PGE Skra Bełchatów	Hala Orbita, Wrocław; Attendance: 2,300; Referees: Kuchna Andrzej - Maroszek Wojciech
6 February 2016; 18:00	(25–18, 20–25, 18–25, 24–26)			Hala Orbita, Wrocław; Attendance: 2,300; Referees: Kuchna Andrzej - Maroszek Wojciech

=== 2015–16 CEV Champions League ===
==== Pool G ====
4 November 2015; 18:00	Asseco Resovia Rzeszów (Poland)	3–0	(Switzerland) #Dragons Lugano	Podpromie Hall, Rzeszów; Attendance: 4,068; Referees: EVA Tibor (HUN) - OLEYNIK Vladimir (RUS)
4 November 2015; 18:00	(25–16, 25–17, 25–19)			Podpromie Hall, Rzeszów; Attendance: 4,068; Referees: EVA Tibor (HUN) - OLEYNIK Vladimir (RUS)

17 November 2015; 18:00	Tomis Constanța (Romania)	0–3	(Poland) Asseco Resovia Rzeszów	Sports Hall, Constanta; Attendance: 800; Referees: OVUKA Sinisa (BIH) - HOSNUT Onur (TUR)
17 November 2015; 18:00	(20–25, 19–25, 21–25)			Sports Hall, Constanta; Attendance: 800; Referees: OVUKA Sinisa (BIH) - HOSNUT Onur (TUR)

2 December 2015; 18:00	Asseco Resovia Rzeszów (Poland)	3–0	(Belgium) Euphony Asse-Lennik	Podpromie Hall, Rzeszów; Attendance: 4,200; Referees: LA MICELA Sandro (ITA) - SKUDNIK Boris (SLO)
2 December 2015; 18:00	(25–16, 25–18, 25–18)			Podpromie Hall, Rzeszów; Attendance: 4,200; Referees: LA MICELA Sandro (ITA) - SKUDNIK Boris (SLO)

17 December 2015; 20:30	Euphony Asse-Lennik (Belgium)	1–3	(Poland) Asseco Resovia Rzeszów	Sporthal Arena, Deurne, Antwerp; Attendance: 1,150; Referees: BLOEMHARD Marc (NED) - MCDOUGALL Brian
17 December 2015; 20:30	(25–21, 13–25, 24–26, 14–25)			Sporthal Arena, Deurne, Antwerp; Attendance: 1,150; Referees: BLOEMHARD Marc (NED) - MCDOUGALL Brian

20 January 2016; 20:30; *Tomis CONSTANTA withdrew from the competition after Leg 4	Asseco Resovia Rzeszów (Poland)	3–0	(Romania) Tomis Constanța	Podpromie Hall, Rzeszów
20 January 2016; 20:30; *Tomis CONSTANTA withdrew from the competition after Leg 4	(25–0, 25–0, 25–0)			Podpromie Hall, Rzeszów

26 January 2016; 19:30	#Dragons Lugano (Switzerland)	0–3	(Poland) Asseco Resovia Rzeszów	RESEGA Pista Ghiaccio, Lugano; Attendance: 1,650; Referees: GNANI Giorgio (ITA) - HUDIK Martin (CZE)
26 January 2016; 19:30	(23–25, 17–25, 18–25)			RESEGA Pista Ghiaccio, Lugano; Attendance: 1,650; Referees: GNANI Giorgio (ITA) - HUDIK Martin (CZE)

==== Final Four ====
16 April 2016; 16:30	Zenit Kazan (Russia)	3–1	(Poland) Asseco Resovia Rzeszów	Tauron Arena Kraków, Kraków; Attendance: 12,137; Referees: GRADINSKI Goran (SRB) - HUHTANISKA Ahti (FIN)
16 April 2016; 16:30	(22–25, 26–24, 25–18, 25–21)			Tauron Arena Kraków, Kraków; Attendance: 12,137; Referees: GRADINSKI Goran (SRB) - HUHTANISKA Ahti (FIN)

17 April 2016; 14:45	Cucine Lube Civitanova (Italy)	3–2	(Poland) Asseco Resovia Rzeszów	Tauron Arena Kraków, Kraków; Attendance: 13,000; Referees: BARNSTORF Ralph (GER) - GRADINSKI Goran (SRB)
17 April 2016; 14:45	(25–20, 25–27, 22–25, 25–22, 15–10)			Tauron Arena Kraków, Kraków; Attendance: 13,000; Referees: BARNSTORF Ralph (GER) - GRADINSKI Goran (SRB)
