= 2016–17 PGE Skra Bełchatów season =

PGE Skra Bełchatów
2016–17 season
- Chairman: Konrad Piechocki
- Manager: Philippe Blain

PGE Skra Bełchatów 2016–2017 season is the 2016/2017 volleyball season for Polish professional volleyball club PGE Skra Bełchatów.

The club competes in:

- Polish Championship
- Polish Cup
- CEV Champions League qualification
- CEV Champions League

== Team roster ==
Head coach:	Philippe Blain
Assistant:	Krzysztof Stelmach

No.	Name	Date of birth	Position
1	(Serbia) Srećko Lisinac	May 17, 1992	middle blocker
2	(Poland) Mariusz Wlazły (C)	August 4, 1983	opposite
4	(Poland) Mariusz Marcyniak	March 5, 1992	middle blocker
5	(Poland) Bartosz Kurek	August 29, 1988	opposite
6	(Poland) Karol Kłos	August 8, 1989	middle blocker
7	(Poland) Bartosz Bednorz	July 25, 1994	outside hitter
8	(Ukraine) Jurij Gladyr	July 8, 1984	middle blocker
9	(Poland) Marcin Janusz	July 31, 1994	setter
10	(Argentina) Nicolás Uriarte	March 21, 1990	setter
11	(Serbia) Mihajlo Stanković	June 5, 1993	outside hitter
12	(Poland) Artur Szalpuk	March 20, 1995	outside hitter
13	(Poland) Michał Winiarski	September 28, 1983	outside hitter
16	(Poland) Kacper Piechocki	February 17, 1995	libero
17	(Bulgaria) Nikolay Penchev	May 22, 1992	outside hitter
18	(Poland) Robert Milczarek	November 28, 1983	libero

Players of PGE Skra Bełchatów on loan in season 2016/17:

Name	Date of birth	Position	Current club
(Bulgaria) Chono Penchev	December 11, 1994	setter	(Greece) Iraklis Thessaloniki
(Bulgaria) Rozalin Penchev	December 11, 1994	outside hitter	(Italy) Top Volley Latina
(Serbia) Milan Katić	October 22, 1993	outside hitter	(Poland) Łuczniczka Bydgoszcz
(Serbia) Aleksa Brđović	July 29, 1993	setter	(Russia) Gazprom-Ugra Surgut
(Poland) Krzysztof Bieńkowski	June 17, 1995	setter	(Poland) BBTS Bielsko-Biała
(Poland) Piotr Badura	February 20, 1995	middle blocker	(Poland) Stal AZS PWSZ Nysa
(Poland) Tomasz Fornal	August 31, 1997	outside hitter	(Poland) Cerrad Czarni Radom

== Squad changes for the 2016–2017 season ==
In:

No.	Player	Position	From
5	(Poland) Bartosz Kurek	opposite	JT Thunders Hiroshima
7	(Poland) Bartosz Bednorz	outside hitter	Indykpol AZS Olsztyn
8	(Ukraine) Jurij Gladyr	middle blocker	ZAKSA Kędzierzyn-Koźle
12	(Poland) Artur Szalpuk	outside hitter	Cerrad Czarni Radom
15	(Serbia) Dražen Luburić	opposite	LPR Piacenza
18	(Bulgaria) Nikolay Penchev	outside hitter	Asseco Resovia Rzeszów

Out:

No.	Player	Position	To
7	(Argentina) Facundo Conte	outside hitter	Fudan University Shanghai
8	(Poland) Andrzej Wrona	middle blocker	ONICO AZS Politechnika Warszawska
14	(Poland) Marcel Gromadowski	opposite	Łuczniczka Bydgoszcz
15	(Serbia) Dražen Luburić	opposite	JT Thunders Hiroshima
18	(France) Nicolas Maréchal	outside hitter	İstanbul Belediyesi
19	(Spain) Israel Rodríguez	outside hitter	CV Almería

== Most Valuable Players ==
No.	Player	MVP
1.	Mariusz Wlazły	7
2.	Srećko Lisinac	5
	Bartosz Kurek	5
4.	Nicolas Uriarte	2
	Artur Szalpuk	2
	Kacper Piechocki	2
	Karol Kłos	2
8.	Marcin Janusz	1
	Michał Winiarski	1
	Jurij Gladyr	1

== Results, schedules and standings ==
=== 2016–17 PlusLiga ===
==== Regular season ====
5 October 2016; 18:00	PGE Skra Bełchatów	3–0	MKS Będzin	Energia Hall, Bełchatów; Attendance: 2,000; Referees: Janik Tomasz - Herbik Marcin
5 October 2016; 18:00	(25–18, 25–18, 26–24) MVP: Mariusz Wlazły			Energia Hall, Bełchatów; Attendance: 2,000; Referees: Janik Tomasz - Herbik Marcin

9 October 2016; 14:45	ZAKSA Kędzierzyn-Koźle	1–3	PGE Skra Bełchatów	Azoty Hall, Kędzierzyn-Koźle; Attendance: 3,300; Referees: Dudek Piotr - Gadzina Mariusz
9 October 2016; 14:45	(25–22, 26–28, 24–26, 23–25) MVP: Srecko Lisinac			Azoty Hall, Kędzierzyn-Koźle; Attendance: 3,300; Referees: Dudek Piotr - Gadzina Mariusz

15 October 2016; 14:45	PGE Skra Bełchatów	1–3	Asseco Resovia Rzeszów	Energia Hall, Bełchatów; Attendance: 2,700; Referees: Król Piotr - Maroszek Wojciech
15 October 2016; 14:45	(23–25, 18–25, 25–19, 20–25) MVP: Fabian Drzyzga			Energia Hall, Bełchatów; Attendance: 2,700; Referees: Król Piotr - Maroszek Wojciech

20 October 2016; 19:00	Espadon Szczecin	3–0^{1}	PGE Skra Bełchatów	Azoty Arena, Szczecin; Attendance: 2,060; Referees: Kuchna Andrzej - Budzik Marek
20 October 2016; 19:00	(25–0, 25–0, 25–0) MVP: Marcin Janusz^{1} Originally, the result of match Espadon Szczecin vs. PGE Skra Bełchatów was 0:3 (27–29, 19–25, 27–29). On October 27, 2016 Polish Volleyball Federation ruled that due to the improper presence of four foreign players of PGE Skra Belchatow at one time on the pitch, match won Espadon Szczecin by walkover.			Azoty Arena, Szczecin; Attendance: 2,060; Referees: Kuchna Andrzej - Budzik Marek

26 October 2016; 18:00	PGE Skra Bełchatów	3–0	ONICO AZS Politechnika Warszawska	Energia Hall, Bełchatów; Attendance: 2,700; Referees: Wolski Zbigniew - Sokół Katarzyna
26 October 2016; 18:00	(25–20, 30–28, 25–22) MVP: Srecko Lisinac			Energia Hall, Bełchatów; Attendance: 2,700; Referees: Wolski Zbigniew - Sokół Katarzyna

29 October 2016; 14:45	PGE Skra Bełchatów	3–0	Lotos Trefl Gdańsk	Energia Hall, Bełchatów; Attendance: 2,700; Referees: Niemczura Waldemar - Lagierski Marek
29 October 2016; 14:45	(25–18, 30–28, 25–16) MVP: Michał Winiarski			Energia Hall, Bełchatów; Attendance: 2,700; Referees: Niemczura Waldemar - Lagierski Marek

5 November 2016; 14:45	Cuprum Lubin	0–3	PGE Skra Bełchatów	HWS RCS, Lubin; Attendance: 3,350; Referees: Lagierski Marek - Dudek Piotr
5 November 2016; 14:45	(23–25, 19–25, 19–25) MVP: Mariusz Wlazły			HWS RCS, Lubin; Attendance: 3,350; Referees: Lagierski Marek - Dudek Piotr

12 November 2016; 14:45	PGE Skra Bełchatów	3–0	Cerrad Czarni Radom	Energia Hall, Bełchatów; Attendance: 2,700; Referees: Sokół Katarzyna - Pindral Szymon
12 November 2016; 14:45	(25–12, 25–23, 25–18) MVP: Nicolas Uriarte			Energia Hall, Bełchatów; Attendance: 2,700; Referees: Sokół Katarzyna - Pindral Szymon

9 November 2016; 18:00	Jastrzębski Węgiel	3–2	PGE Skra Bełchatów	Hala Sportowa, Jastrzębie-Zdrój; Attendance: 3,000; Referees: Herbik Marcin - Janik Tomasz
9 November 2016; 18:00	(22–25, 25–22, 25–21, 23–25, 15–11) MVP: Salvador Hidalgo Oliva			Hala Sportowa, Jastrzębie-Zdrój; Attendance: 3,000; Referees: Herbik Marcin - Janik Tomasz

25 November 2016; 20:15	PGE Skra Bełchatów	3–0	GKS Katowice	Energia Hall, Bełchatów; Attendance: 2,500; Referees: Skowroński Piotr - Heyducki Marek
25 November 2016; 20:15	(25–19, 25–17, 25–22) MVP: Kacper Piechocki			Energia Hall, Bełchatów; Attendance: 2,500; Referees: Skowroński Piotr - Heyducki Marek

30 November 2016; 18:00	Łuczniczka Bydgoszcz	0–3	PGE Skra Bełchatów	Łuczniczka, Bydgoszcz; Attendance: 4,800; Referees: Twardowski Maciej - Gadzina Mariusz
30 November 2016; 18:00	(23–25, 19–25, 23–25) MVP: Nicolas Uriarte			Łuczniczka, Bydgoszcz; Attendance: 4,800; Referees: Twardowski Maciej - Gadzina Mariusz

3 December 2016; 14:45	PGE Skra Bełchatów	3–1	Indykpol AZS Olsztyn	Energia Hall, Bełchatów; Attendance: 2,650; Referees: Twardowski Maciej - Niemczura Waldemar
3 December 2016; 14:45	(25–27, 25–22, 25–13, 25–21) MVP: Artur Szalpuk			Energia Hall, Bełchatów; Attendance: 2,650; Referees: Twardowski Maciej - Niemczura Waldemar

10 December 2016; 20:00	AZS Częstochowa	1–3	PGE Skra Bełchatów	Hala Sportowa 'Częstochowa', Częstochowa; Attendance: 2,750; Referees: Gołąbek Sławomir - Sokół Katarzyna
10 December 2016; 20:00	(30–28, 15–25, 22–25, 21–25) MVP: Artur Szalpuk			Hala Sportowa 'Częstochowa', Częstochowa; Attendance: 2,750; Referees: Gołąbek Sławomir - Sokół Katarzyna

14 December 2016; 18:00	PGE Skra Bełchatów	3–0	BBTS Bielsko-Biała	Energia Hall, Bełchatów; Attendance: 2,500; Referees: Dudek Piotr - Burkiewicz Paweł
14 December 2016; 18:00	(25–17, 25–14, 25–21) MVP: Bartosz Kurek			Energia Hall, Bełchatów; Attendance: 2,500; Referees: Dudek Piotr - Burkiewicz Paweł

17 December 2016; 18:00	Effector Kielce	0–3	PGE Skra Bełchatów	Legionów Hall, Kielce; Attendance: 2,750; Referees: Gadzina Mariusz - Dudek Piotr
17 December 2016; 18:00	(20–25, 20–25, 17–25) MVP: Kacper Piechocki			Legionów Hall, Kielce; Attendance: 2,750; Referees: Gadzina Mariusz - Dudek Piotr

30 December 2016; 19:00	MKS Będzin	2–3	PGE Skra Bełchatów	Hala Widowiskowo Sportowa, Sosnowiec; Attendance: 1,400; Referees: Gołąbek Sławomir - Kobienia Waldemar
30 December 2016; 19:00	(18–25, 28–26, 25–22, 23–25, 10–15) MVP: Srecko Lisinac			Hala Widowiskowo Sportowa, Sosnowiec; Attendance: 1,400; Referees: Gołąbek Sławomir - Kobienia Waldemar

7 January 2017; 14:45	PGE Skra Bełchatów	3–2	ZAKSA Kędzierzyn-Koźle	Energia Hall, Bełchatów; Attendance: 2,700; Referees: Herbik Marcin - Janik Tomasz
7 January 2017; 14:45	(23–25, 19–25, 25–18, 25–20, 15–9) MVP: Mariusz Wlazły			Energia Hall, Bełchatów; Attendance: 2,700; Referees: Herbik Marcin - Janik Tomasz

28 January 2017; 14:45	Asseco Resovia Rzeszów	3–1	PGE Skra Bełchatów	Podpromie Hall, Rzeszów; Attendance: 4,304; Referees: Burkiewicz Paweł - Twardowski Maciej
28 January 2017; 14:45	(20–25, 25–22, 30–28, 25–17) MVP: Gavin Schmitt			Podpromie Hall, Rzeszów; Attendance: 4,304; Referees: Burkiewicz Paweł - Twardowski Maciej

22 January 2017; 18:00	PGE Skra Bełchatów	3–0	Espadon Szczecin	Energia Hall, Bełchatów; Attendance: 2,000; Referees: Niewiarowska Magdalena - Niedbał Anna
22 January 2017; 18:00	(25–23, 25–21, 25–23) MVP: Jurij Gladyr			Energia Hall, Bełchatów; Attendance: 2,000; Referees: Niewiarowska Magdalena - Niedbał Anna

4 February 2017; 14:45	ONICO AZS Politechnika Warszawska	3–1	PGE Skra Bełchatów	Torwar Hall, Warsaw; Attendance: 5,800; Referees: Broński Jacek - Gołąbek Sławomir
4 February 2017; 14:45	(25–22, 22–25, 25–23, 25–18) MVP: Maciej Olenderek			Torwar Hall, Warsaw; Attendance: 5,800; Referees: Broński Jacek - Gołąbek Sławomir

11 February 2017; 14:45	Lotos Trefl Gdańsk	2–3	PGE Skra Bełchatów	Ergo Arena, Gdańsk; Attendance: 6,850; Referees: Pindral Szymon - Niewiarowska Magdalena
11 February 2017; 14:45	(25–21, 20–25, 25–16, 18–25, 10–15) MVP: Bartosz Kurek			Ergo Arena, Gdańsk; Attendance: 6,850; Referees: Pindral Szymon - Niewiarowska Magdalena

18 February 2017; 14:45	PGE Skra Bełchatów	3–0	Cuprum Lubin	Energia Hall, Bełchatów; Referees: Flis Tomasz - Kolendowski Maciej
18 February 2017; 14:45	(25–20, 25–16, 25–23) MVP: Mariusz Wlazły			Energia Hall, Bełchatów; Referees: Flis Tomasz - Kolendowski Maciej

21 February 2017; 20:30	Cerrad Czarni Radom	2–3	PGE Skra Bełchatów	Hala MOSiR, Radom; Attendance: 1,510; Referees: Lagierski Marek - Maroszek Wojciech
21 February 2017; 20:30	(25–16, 19–25, 25–22, 17–25, 10–15) MVP: Srecko Lisinac			Hala MOSiR, Radom; Attendance: 1,510; Referees: Lagierski Marek - Maroszek Wojciech

26 February 2017; 14:45	PGE Skra Bełchatów	3–2	Jastrzębski Węgiel	Energia Hall, Bełchatów; Attendance: 2,700; Referees: Kobienia Waldemar - Ignatowicz Paweł
26 February 2017; 14:45	(25–27, 25–17, 23–25, 25–15, 15–10) MVP: Bartosz Kurek			Energia Hall, Bełchatów; Attendance: 2,700; Referees: Kobienia Waldemar - Ignatowicz Paweł

4 March 2017; 20:00	GKS Katowice	2–3	PGE Skra Bełchatów	Szopienice Hall, Katowice; Attendance: 1,500; Referees: Twardowski Maciej - Niedbał Anna
4 March 2017; 20:00	(22–25, 25–21, 20–25, 25–22, 13–15) MVP: Karol Kłos			Szopienice Hall, Katowice; Attendance: 1,500; Referees: Twardowski Maciej - Niedbał Anna

8 March 2017; 17:00	PGE Skra Bełchatów	3–0	Łuczniczka Bydgoszcz	Energia Hall, Bełchatów; Attendance: 1,800; Referees: Kolendowski Maciej - Litwin Jacek
8 March 2017; 17:00	(25–14, 25–14, 25–9) MVP: Mariusz Wlazły			Energia Hall, Bełchatów; Attendance: 1,800; Referees: Kolendowski Maciej - Litwin Jacek

11 March 2017; 14:45	Indykpol AZS Olsztyn	2–3	PGE Skra Bełchatów	Urania Hall, Olsztyn; Attendance: 2,400; Referees: Ignatowicz Paweł - Kobienia Waldemar
11 March 2017; 14:45	(27–29, 15–25, 25–22, 25–19, 9–15) MVP: Srecko Lisinac			Urania Hall, Olsztyn; Attendance: 2,400; Referees: Ignatowicz Paweł - Kobienia Waldemar

18 March 2017; 17:00	PGE Skra Bełchatów	3–0	AZS Częstochowa	Energia Hall, Bełchatów; Attendance: 2,700; Referees: Michlic Agnieszka - Herbik Marcin
18 March 2017; 17:00	(25–19, 25–18, 25–19) MVP: Mariusz Wlazły			Energia Hall, Bełchatów; Attendance: 2,700; Referees: Michlic Agnieszka - Herbik Marcin

25 March 2017; 15:00	BBTS Bielsko-Biała	0–3	PGE Skra Bełchatów	Dębowiec Sports Arena, Bielsko-Biała; Attendance: 2,501; Referees: Niewiarowska Magdalena - Niedbał Anna
25 March 2017; 15:00	(19–25, 24–26, 14–25) MVP: Mariusz Wlazły			Dębowiec Sports Arena, Bielsko-Biała; Attendance: 2,501; Referees: Niewiarowska Magdalena - Niedbał Anna

2 April 2017; 17:30	PGE Skra Bełchatów	3–0	Effector Kielce	Energia Hall, Bełchatów; Referees: Sokół Katarzyna - Niedbał Anna
2 April 2017; 17:30	(25–14, 25–19, 25–17) MVP: Karol Kłos			Energia Hall, Bełchatów; Referees: Sokół Katarzyna - Niedbał Anna

==== Semifinal ====
9 April 2017; 17:30	PGE Skra Bełchatów	3–0	Asseco Resovia Rzeszów	Atlas Arena, Łódź; Attendance: 6,587; Referees: Maroszek Wojciech - Lagierski Marek
9 April 2017; 17:30	(25–21, 25–15, 25–13) MVP: Bartosz Kurek			Atlas Arena, Łódź; Attendance: 6,587; Referees: Maroszek Wojciech - Lagierski Marek

12 April 2017; 20:30	Asseco Resovia Rzeszów	2–3	PGE Skra Bełchatów	Podpromie Hall, Rzeszów; Referees: Twardowski Maciej - Pindral Szymon
12 April 2017; 20:30	(25–21, 19–25, 25–21, 18–25, 8–15) MVP: Bartosz Kurek			Podpromie Hall, Rzeszów; Referees: Twardowski Maciej - Pindral Szymon

==== Final ====
19 April 2017; 18:00	PGE Skra Bełchatów	0–3	ZAKSA Kędzierzyn-Koźle	Atlas Arena, Łódź; Attendance: 9,592; Referees: Maroszek Wojciech - Lagierski Marek
19 April 2017; 18:00	(25–27, 21–25, 19–25) MVP: Dawid Konarski			Atlas Arena, Łódź; Attendance: 9,592; Referees: Maroszek Wojciech - Lagierski Marek

23 April 2017; 20:30	ZAKSA Kędzierzyn-Koźle	3–1	PGE Skra Bełchatów	Azoty Hall, Kędzierzyn-Koźle; Attendance: 3,375; Referees: Burkiewicz Paweł - Twardowski Maciej
23 April 2017; 20:30	(21–25, 25–23, 27–25, 25–18) MVP: Benjamin Toniutti			Azoty Hall, Kędzierzyn-Koźle; Attendance: 3,375; Referees: Burkiewicz Paweł - Twardowski Maciej

=== 2016–17 Polish Cup ===
4 January 2017; 18:00	PGE Skra Bełchatów	3–1	GKS Katowice	Energia Hall, Bełchatów; Attendance: 1,000; Referees: Niewiarowska Magdalena - Myszkowski Marcin
4 January 2017; 18:00	(25–22, 25–19, 22–25, 25–19)			Energia Hall, Bełchatów; Attendance: 1,000; Referees: Niewiarowska Magdalena - Myszkowski Marcin

11 January 2017; 18:00	PGE Skra Bełchatów	3–2	Espadon Szczecin	Energia Hall, Bełchatów; Attendance: 1,000; Referees: Skowroński Piotr - Heyducki Marek
11 January 2017; 18:00	(25–19, 16–25, 25–19, 22–25, 15–12)			Energia Hall, Bełchatów; Attendance: 1,000; Referees: Skowroński Piotr - Heyducki Marek

==== Final four ====
14 January 2017; 18:00	Lotos Trefl Gdańsk	0–3	PGE Skra Bełchatów	Centennial Hall, Wrocław; Attendance: 2,480; Referees: Maroszek Wojciech - Lagierski Marek
14 January 2017; 18:00	(27–29, 22–25, 21–25) MVP: Robert Milczarek			Centennial Hall, Wrocław; Attendance: 2,480; Referees: Maroszek Wojciech - Lagierski Marek

15 January 2017; 14:45	ZAKSA Kędzierzyn-Koźle	3–1	PGE Skra Bełchatów	Centennial Hall, Wrocław; Attendance: 5,700; Referees: Herbik Marcin - Janik Tomasz
15 January 2017; 14:45	(29–27, 25–27, 25–20, 25–18) MVP: Dawid Konarski			Centennial Hall, Wrocław; Attendance: 5,700; Referees: Herbik Marcin - Janik Tomasz

=== 2016–17 CEV Champions League qualification ===
==== Third round ====
16 November 2016; 19:00	PAOK Thessaloniki (Greece)	0–3	(Poland) PGE Skra Bełchatów	P.A.O.K. Sports Arena, Thessaloniki; Attendance: 1,100; Referees: GOREN Roy - LAZAREVIC Ivan
16 November 2016; 19:00	(22–25, 17–25, 20–25)			P.A.O.K. Sports Arena, Thessaloniki; Attendance: 1,100; Referees: GOREN Roy - LAZAREVIC Ivan

20 November 2016; 20:00	PGE Skra Bełchatów (Poland)	3–1	(Greece) PAOK Thessaloniki	WOSiR, Wieluń; Referees: MURULO Toomas - KNIZHNIKOV Nikolai
20 November 2016; 20:00	(25–14, 14–25, 25–15, 25–17) MVP: Artur Szalpuk			WOSiR, Wieluń; Referees: MURULO Toomas - KNIZHNIKOV Nikolai

=== 2016–17 CEV Champions League ===
==== Pool D ====
6 December 2016; 18:00	SCM U Craiova (Romania)	3–1	(Poland) PGE Skra Bełchatów	Sala Polivalenta Oltenia, Craiova; Attendance: 1,215; Referees: GRADINSKI Goran - HOSNUT Onur
6 December 2016; 18:00	(30–28, 25–23, 19–25, 25–22)			Sala Polivalenta Oltenia, Craiova; Attendance: 1,215; Referees: GRADINSKI Goran - HOSNUT Onur

20 December 2016; 17:30	PGE Skra Bełchatów (Poland)	1–3	(Italy) Azimut Modena	Atlas Arena, Łódź; Attendance: 10,900; Referees: FERNANDEZ FUENTES David - GEORGIEV Ilian
20 December 2016; 17:30	(22–25, 25–21, 17–25, 22–25)			Atlas Arena, Łódź; Attendance: 10,900; Referees: FERNANDEZ FUENTES David - GEORGIEV Ilian

19 January 2017; 18:00	ACH Volley Ljubljana (Slovenia)	1–3	(Poland) PGE Skra Bełchatów	Arena Stožice, Ljubljana; Attendance: 800; Referees: NASTASE Lucian-Vasile - KOVAR Vlastimil
19 January 2017; 18:00	(19–25, 21–25, 25–18, 15–25)			Arena Stožice, Ljubljana; Attendance: 800; Referees: NASTASE Lucian-Vasile - KOVAR Vlastimil

1 February 2017; 18:00	PGE Skra Bełchatów (Poland)	3–1	(Slovenia) ACH Volley Ljubljana	Energia Hall, Bełchatów; Attendance: 2,550; Referees: WITTE Sabine - SARIKAYA Ozan Cagi
1 February 2017; 18:00	(25–17, 25–23, 20–25, 25–17)			Energia Hall, Bełchatów; Attendance: 2,550; Referees: WITTE Sabine - SARIKAYA Ozan Cagi

14 February 2017; 20:30	Azimut Modena (Italy)	3–1	(Poland) PGE Skra Bełchatów	PalaPanini, Modena; Attendance: 3,575; Referees: AKINCI Erdal - KRTICKA Jan
14 February 2017; 20:30	(25–16, 21–25, 25–22, 25–22)			PalaPanini, Modena; Attendance: 3,575; Referees: AKINCI Erdal - KRTICKA Jan

1 March 2017; 20:00	PGE Skra Bełchatów (Poland)	3–0	(Romania) SCM U Craiova	Energia Hall, Bełchatów; Attendance: 2,550; Referees: MEDVID Mykhaylo - BOULANGER Marie-Catherine
1 March 2017; 20:00	(26–24, 25–18, 25–14)			Energia Hall, Bełchatów; Attendance: 2,550; Referees: MEDVID Mykhaylo - BOULANGER Marie-Catherine

==== Playoff 12 ====
15 March 2017; 18:00	PGE Skra Bełchatów (Poland)	1–3	(Italy) Cucine Lube Civitanova	Atlas Arena, Łódź; Attendance: 8,100; Referees: MAKSHANOV Evgeny - LAZAREVIC Ivan
15 March 2017; 18:00	(21–25, 25–21, 23–25, 21–25)			Atlas Arena, Łódź; Attendance: 8,100; Referees: MAKSHANOV Evgeny - LAZAREVIC Ivan

22 March 2017; 20:30	Cucine Lube Civitanova (Italy)	2–3	(Poland) PGE Skra Bełchatów	Eurosuole Forum, Civitanova Marche; Attendance: 2,320; Referees: ADLER Laszlo - PORVAZNIK Igor
22 March 2017; 20:30	(26–24, 25–16, 26–28, 15–25, 13–15)			Eurosuole Forum, Civitanova Marche; Attendance: 2,320; Referees: ADLER Laszlo - PORVAZNIK Igor
