= 2018–19 Polish Men's Volleyball Cup =

2018–19 Polish Volleyball Cup
- Sport: Volleyball
- Duration: 26–27 January 2019
- TV partner: Polsat Sport

Finals
- Champions: ZAKSA Kędzierzyn-Koźle (7th title)
- Finals MVP: Aleksander Śliwka (POL)

Seasons
- ← 2017–18 2020–21 →

The 2018–19 Polish Cup was the 62nd edition of the Polish Volleyball Cup tournament.

ZAKSA Kędzierzyn-Koźle beat Jastrzębski Węgiel in the final (3–1) and won their seventh Polish Cup.

== Final four ==
- Venue: Hala Orbita, Wrocław
- All times are Central European Time (UTC+01:00).

Semifinals
26 January
ZAKSA Kędzierzyn-Koźle	3
Aluron Virtu Warta Zawiercie	1
26 January
Onico Warsaw	0
Jastrzębski Węgiel	3

Final
27 January
ZAKSA Kędzierzyn-Koźle	3
Jastrzębski Węgiel	1

=== Semifinals ===
Date	Time		Score		Set 1	Set 2	Set 3	Set 4	Set 5	Total	Report
26 Jan	14:45	ZAKSA Kędzierzyn-Koźle	3–1	Aluron Virtu Warta Zawiercie	25–19	25–20	20–25	25–17		95–81	Report
26 Jan	18:00	Onico Warsaw	0–3	Jastrzębski Węgiel	22–25	23–25	14–25			59–75	Report

=== Final ===
Date	Time		Score		Set 1	Set 2	Set 3	Set 4	Set 5	Total	Report
27 Jan	14:45	ZAKSA Kędzierzyn-Koźle	3–1	Jastrzębski Węgiel	25–20	25–13	25–27	25–17		100–77	Report

== Final standings ==
Qualified for the 2019 Polish SuperCup

Rank	Team
1st place, gold medalist(s)	ZAKSA Kędzierzyn-Koźle
2	Jastrzębski Węgiel
Semifinalists	Aluron Virtu Warta Zawiercie; Onico Warsaw

2018–19 Polish Cup winners
ZAKSA Kędzierzyn-Koźle
7th title

== Awards ==
- Most valuable player

(Poland) Aleksander Śliwka (ZAKSA Kędzierzyn-Koźle)

- Best server

(Poland) Dawid Konarski (Jastrzębski Węgiel)

- Best receiver

(Poland) Rafał Szymura (ZAKSA Kędzierzyn-Koźle)

- Best defender

(Poland) Paweł Zatorski (ZAKSA Kędzierzyn-Koźle)

- Best blocker

(Poland) Łukasz Wiśniewski (ZAKSA Kędzierzyn-Koźle)

- Best opposite

(Poland) Łukasz Kaczmarek (ZAKSA Kędzierzyn-Koźle)

- Best setter

(France) Benjamin Toniutti (ZAKSA Kędzierzyn-Koźle)

== See also ==
- 2018–19 PlusLiga
