= Maurice Torres =

Puerto Rican volleyball player (born 1991)

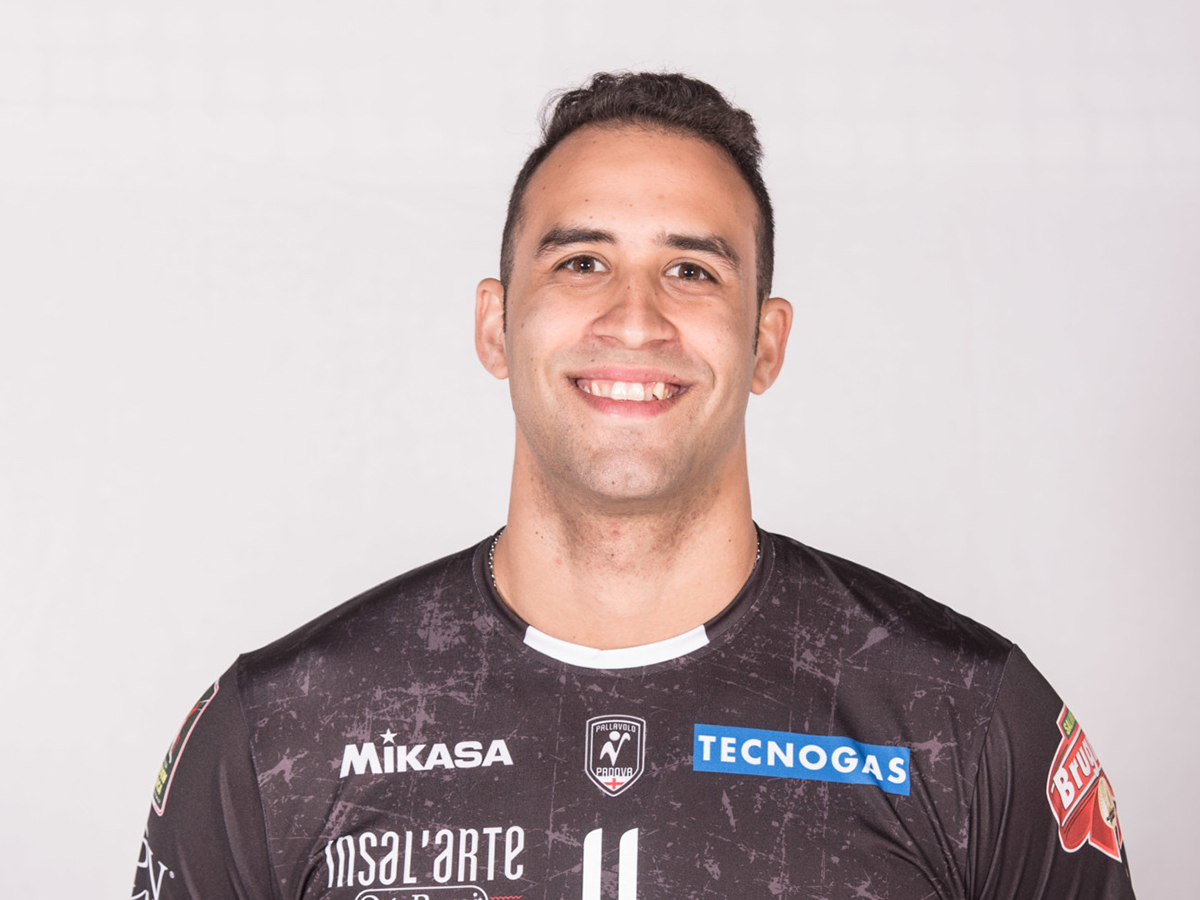

Personal information
- Full name: Maurice Armando Torres
- Nationality: (Puerto Rico) Puerto Rican
- Born: 6 July 1991 (age 35); Ponce, Puerto Rico
- Height: 2.01 m (6 ft 7 in)
- Weight: 98 kg (216 lb)
- Spike: 350 cm (138 in)
- Block: 334 cm (131 in)
- Education: Pepperdine University

Volleyball information
- Position: Opposite

Career
Years	Teams
2013; 2013–2014; 2014; 2014–2015; 2016–2017; 2017–2018; 2018; 2018–2019; 2019–2020; 2020–2022	(Italy) Top Volley Latina (France) Montpellier UC (Puerto Rico) Capitanes de Arecibo (Italy) Pallavolo Molfetta (Italy) Porto Ravenna Volley (Poland) ZAKSA Kędzierzyn-Koźle (Puerto Rico) Mets de Guaynabo (Italy) Pallavolo Padova (Japan) Osaka Blazers Sakai (Turkey) Galatasaray Istanbul

National team
2014–	Puerto Rico
Honours
Representing Puerto Rico
Men's volleyball
NORCECA Championship
Bronze medal – third place	2015 Mexico

Maurice Armando Torres (born 6 July 1991) is a Puerto Rican volleyball player.

== National team career ==
He is a member of the Puerto Rico men's national volleyball team. Torres represented Puerto Rico at the 2014 World Championship held in Poland.

== Sporting achievements ==
- National championships
  - 2017/2018 Polish Championship, with ZAKSA Kędzierzyn-Koźle
  - 2017/2018 Puerto Rican Championship, with Mets de Guaynabo

=== Individual awards ===
- 2017/2018: Puerto Rican Championship – Most Valuable Player

=== Puerto Rican national team ===
Team

- 2014 Central American and Caribbean Games: Runner-up
- 2017 Men's Pan-American Volleyball Cup: Runner-up
- 2018 Central American and Caribbean Games; Champion

Individual

- 2014 Men's Pan-American Volleyball Cup: Best Scorer
- 2018 Central American and Caribbean Games: Best Opposite
- 2018 Central American and Caribbean Games; Best Server
