= Patryk Czarnowski =

Polish volleyball player (born 1985)

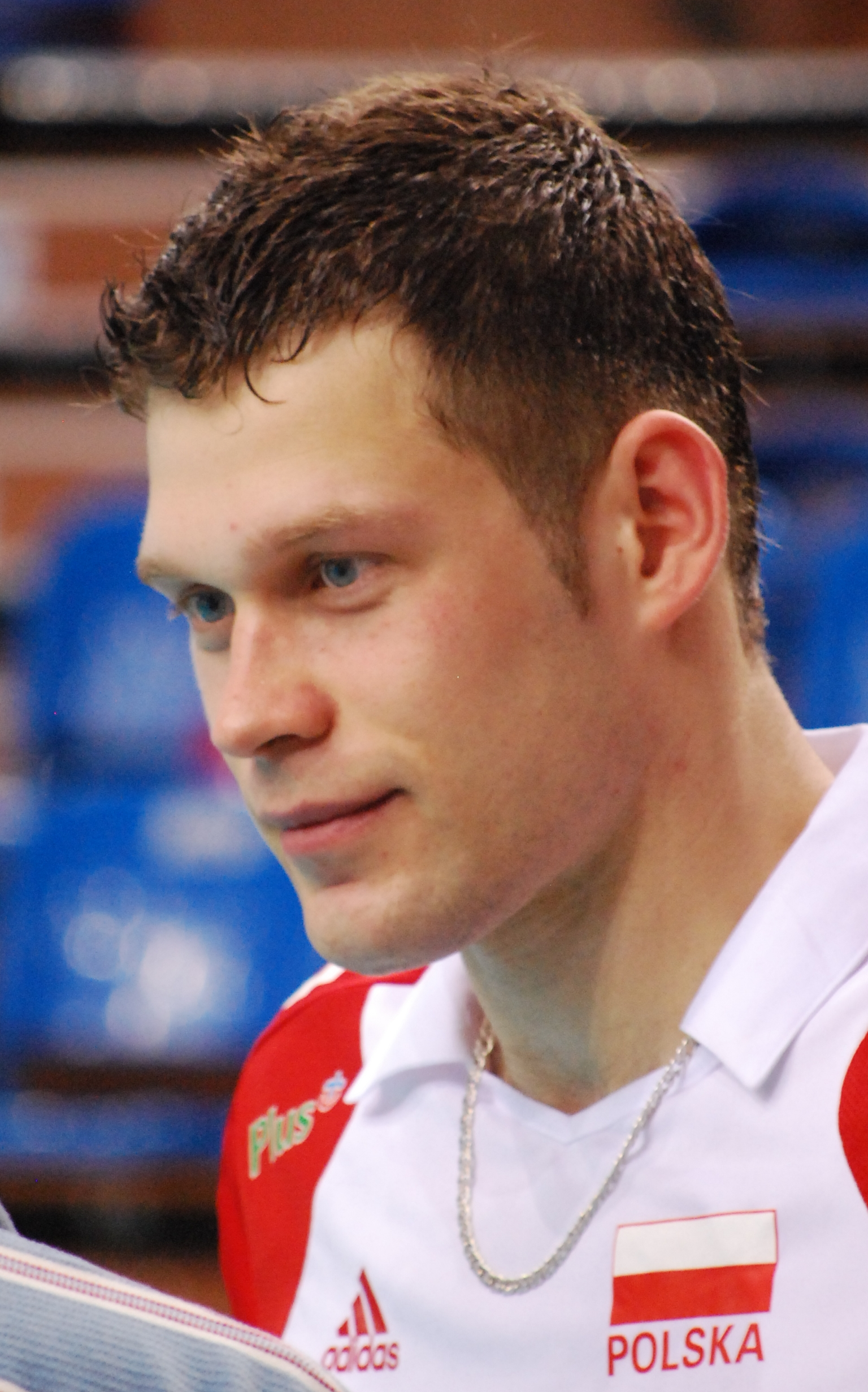
- Czarnowski in 2010

Personal information
- Nationality: (Poland) Polish
- Born: 1 November 1985 (age 40); Ostróda, Poland
- Height: 2.04 m (6 ft 8 in)

Volleyball information
- Position: Middle blocker

Career
| Years | Teams |
|---|---|
| 2004–2007; 2007–2010; 2010–2012; 2012–2015; 2015–2017; 2017–2019; 2019–2021 | AZS Olsztyn; Jastrzębski Węgiel; ZAKSA Kędzierzyn-Koźle; Jastrzębski Węgiel; ZAKSA Kędzierzyn-Koźle; Skra Bełchatów; Warta Zawiercie |

National team
| 2010–2011 | Poland (28) |
Honours
Men's volleyball
Representing Poland
FIVB World Cup
| Silver medal – second place | 2011 Japan |

Patryk Czarnowski (born 1 November 1985) is a Polish former volleyball player. He was part of the Polish national team in 2010–2011, silver medallist at the 2011 World Cup, three–time Polish Champion (2016, 2017, 2018).

== Personal life ==
Czarnowski was born in Ostróda, Poland. He has brother Dariusz. He graduated School of Sports Championship in Spała. He studied pedagogy at the Warmian-Masurian University in Olsztyn. On August 1, 2013 his girlfriend Jagoda gave birth to their son Michał. He is married to Jagoda (née Majewska).

== Career ==
=== Clubs ===
In 2012 he came back to Jastrzębski Węgiel. In season 2012/3013 Czarnowaki won the bronze medal of Polish Championship. In 2013/2014 the club advanced to the Final Four of the Champions League in Ankara and after defeating VC Zenit Kazan won the bronze medal. His team beat ZAKSA Kędzierzyn-Koźle in the last matches in the fight for a medal. Jastrzębski Węgiel ended season with second bronze, this time of Polish Championship. In season 2016/17 was a member of team ZAKSA Kędzierzyn-Koźle. In May 2017 ZAKSA, including Czarnowski, defended title of Polish Champion. Also in May 2017 it was announced that Czarnowski moved to another Polish club PGE Skra Bełchatów.

=== National team ===
Patryk Czarnowski was first appointed to represent the Polish national team by coach Daniel Castellani in 2010. He representing Poland on World Championship 2010. He debuted in Polish national team on May 29, 2010 in a friendly match with France. He won the silver medal of World Cup 2011.

== Honours ==
=== Club ===
- CEV Cup
  - 2010–11 – with ZAKSA Kędzierzyn-Koźle
- CEV Challenge Cup
  - 2008–09 – with Jastrzębski Węgiel
- Domestic
  - 2009–10 Polish Cup, with Jastrzębski Węgiel
  - 2015–16 Polish Championship, with ZAKSA Kędzierzyn-Koźle
  - 2016–17 Polish Cup, with ZAKSA Kędzierzyn-Koźle
  - 2016–17 Polish Championship, with ZAKSA Kędzierzyn-Koźle
  - 2017–18 Polish SuperCup, with PGE Skra Bełchatów
  - 2017–18 Polish Championship, with PGE Skra Bełchatów
  - 2018–19 Polish SuperCup, with PGE Skra Bełchatów

=== Youth national team ===
- 2003 European Youth Olympic Festival
- 2005 CEV U19 European Championship

=== Individual awards ===
- 2010: Polish Cup – Best blocker

=== Statistics ===
- 2009–10 PlusLiga – Best blocker (88 blocks)
