= Sam Deroo =

Belgian volleyball player (born 1992)

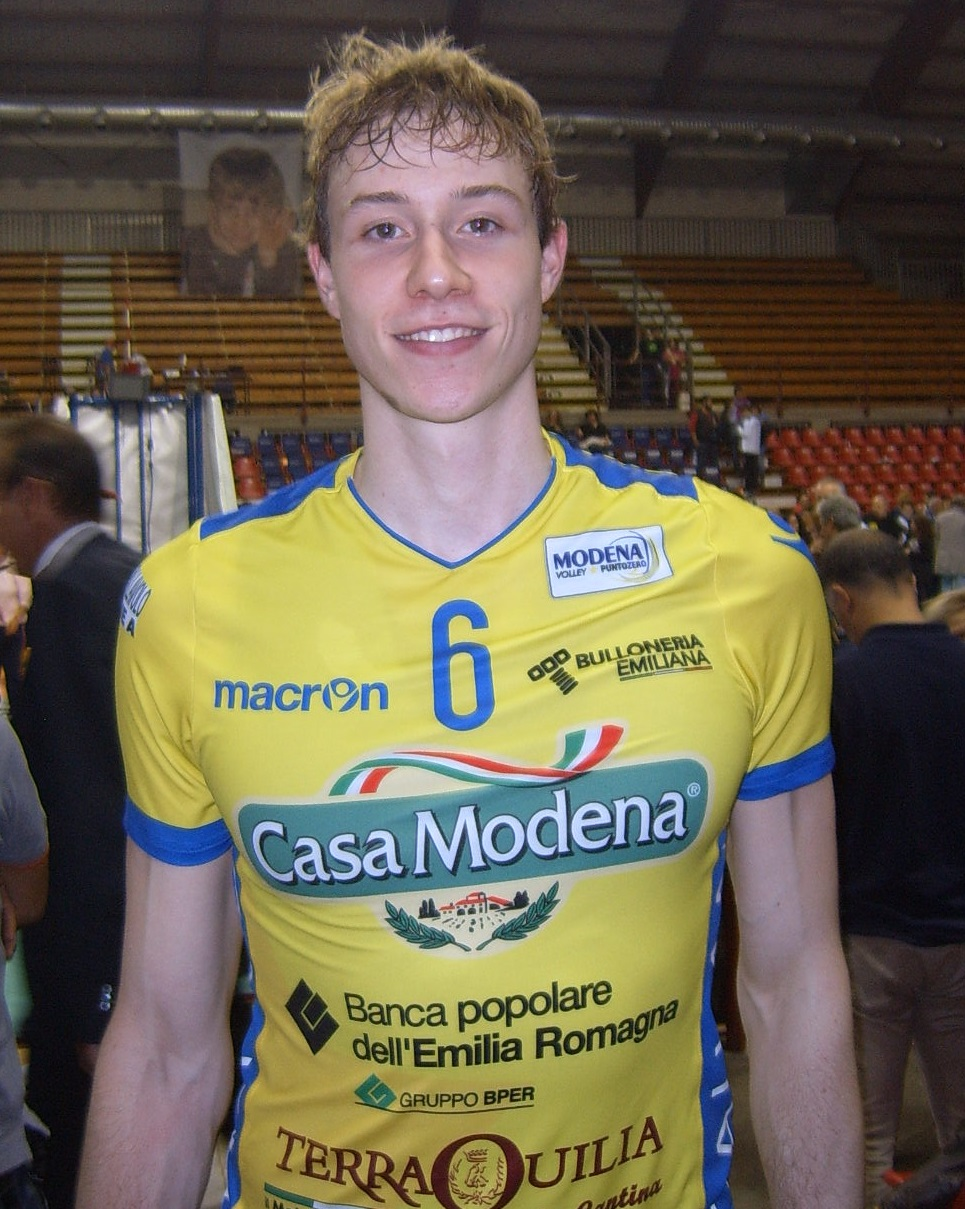
- Deroo in 2013

Personal information
- Born: 29 April 1992 (age 34); Beveren, Belgium
- Height: 2.03 m (6 ft 8 in)
- Weight: 105 kg (231 lb)
- Spike: 355 cm (140 in)
- Block: 335 cm (132 in)

Volleyball information
- Position: Outside hitter
- Current club: Halkbank Ankara
- Number: 3

Career
Years	Teams
2010–2012; 2012–2014; 2014–2015; 2015–2019; 2019; 2019–2021; 2021–2022; 2022–2025; 2025–2026; 2026–	Knack Roeselare; Casa Modena; Calzedonia Verona; ZAKSA Kędzierzyn-Koźle; Al Rayyan; Dynamo Moscow; Asseco Resovia; Zenit Kazan; Lokomotiv Novosibirsk; Halkbank Ankara

National team
2011–	Belgium
Honours
Men's volleyball
Representing Belgium
European League
Gold medal – first place	2013 Turkey

Sam Deroo (born 29 April 1992) is a Belgian professional volleyball player who plays as an outside hitter for Halkbank Ankara and the Belgium national team.

== Career ==
=== Club ===
On 22 May 2015, Deroo signed a contract with ZAKSA Kędzierzyn-Koźle. On 26 April 2016, he won his first title of the Polish Champion. In May 2016, he extended his contract until 2017.

== Honours ==
=== Club ===
- CEV Cup
  - 2020–21 – with Dynamo Moscow
- Domestic
  - 2010–11 Belgian SuperCup, with Knack Roeselare
  - 2010–11 Belgian Cup, with Knack Roeselare
  - 2015–16 Polish Championship, with ZAKSA Kędzierzyn-Koźle
  - 2016–17 Polish Cup, with ZAKSA Kędzierzyn-Koźle
  - 2016–17 Polish Championship, with ZAKSA Kędzierzyn-Koźle
  - 2018–19 Polish Cup, with ZAKSA Kędzierzyn-Koźle
  - 2018–19 Polish Championship, with ZAKSA Kędzierzyn-Koźle
  - 2018–19 Emir Cup, with Al Rayyan
  - 2020–21 Russian Cup, with Dynamo Moscow
  - 2020–21 Russian Championship, with Dynamo Moscow
