= Hala Podpromie =

Indoor arena in Poland

Coordinates: 50.0296°N 22.0010°E

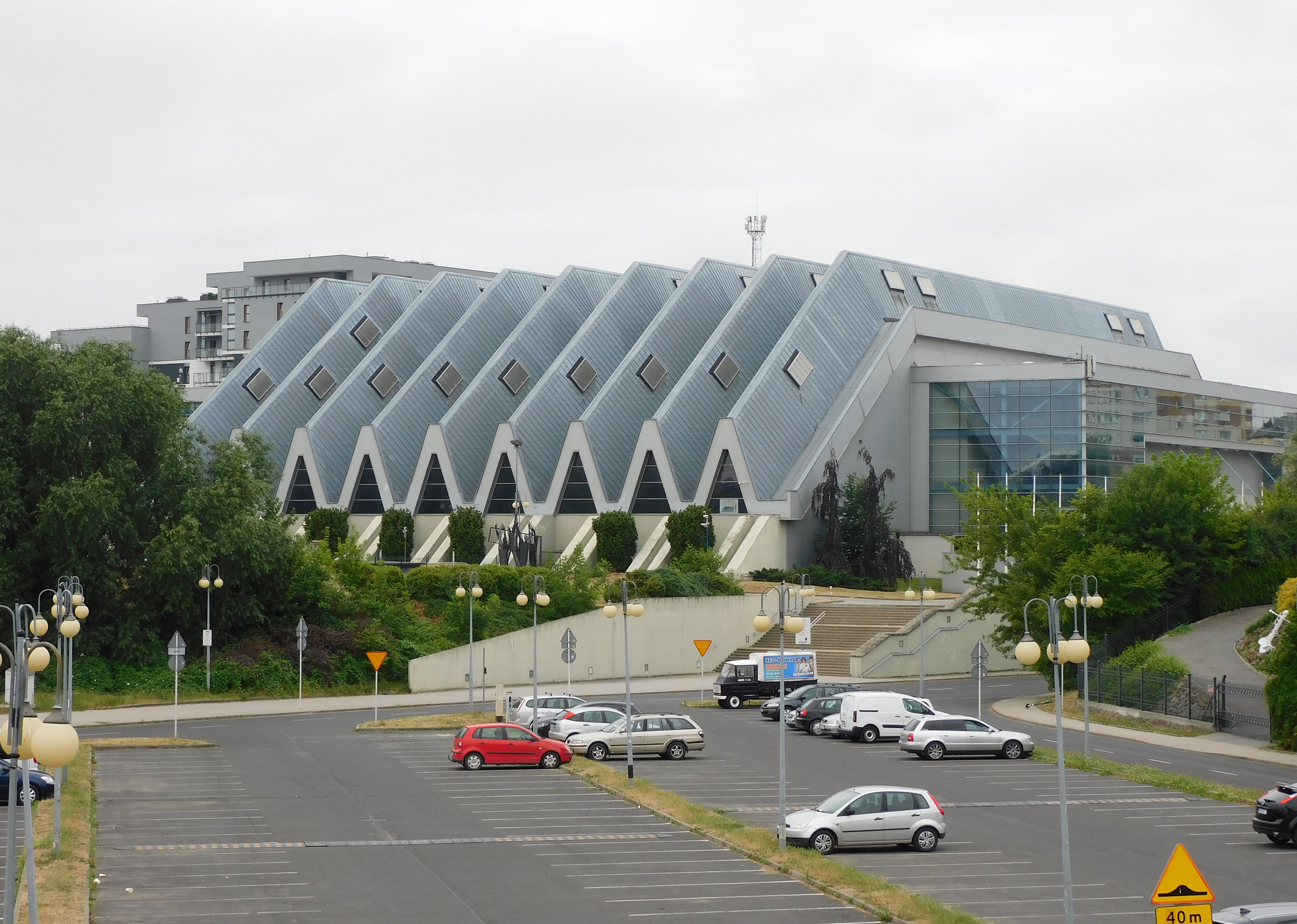
- Interactive map of Hala Podpromie
- Full name: Hala Podpromie im. Jana Strzelczyka
- Location: ul. Podpromie 10; 35–045 Rzeszów
- Capacity: 4,304 (volleyball)

Construction
- Opened: 16 June 2002
- Architect: Stanisław Kuś

Tenants
- Asseco Resovia; Developres Rzeszów

Hala Podpromie im. Jana Strzelczyka is an indoor arena in Rzeszów, Poland.
