= Hala Azoty =

Indoor arena in Poland

Coordinates: 50.3157°N 18.2451°E

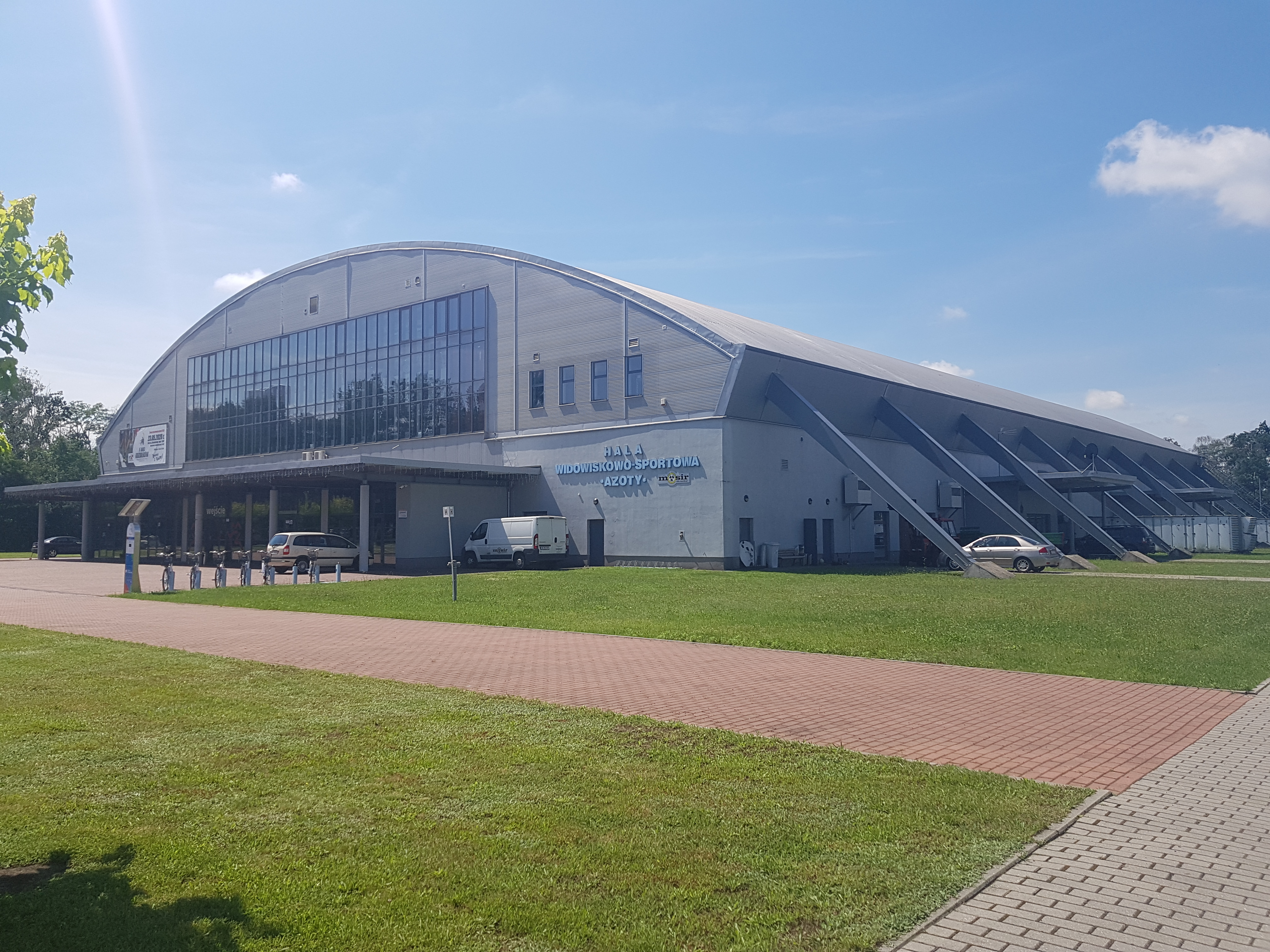
- Interactive map of Hala Azoty
- Full name: Hala Widowiskowo–Sportowa Azoty
- Location: ul. Mostowa 1; 47–223 Kędzierzyn-Koźle
- Operator: MOSiR Kędzierzyn-Koźle
- Capacity: 3,375
- Scoreboard: 6

Construction
- Opened: 20 May 2005

Tenant
- ZAKSA Kędzierzyn-Koźle

Hala Azoty is an indoor arena in Kędzierzyn-Koźle, Poland.

The hall was opened on 20 May 2005, during the friendly match Poland – Slovakia.
