= Dawid Konarski =

Polish volleyball player (born 1989)

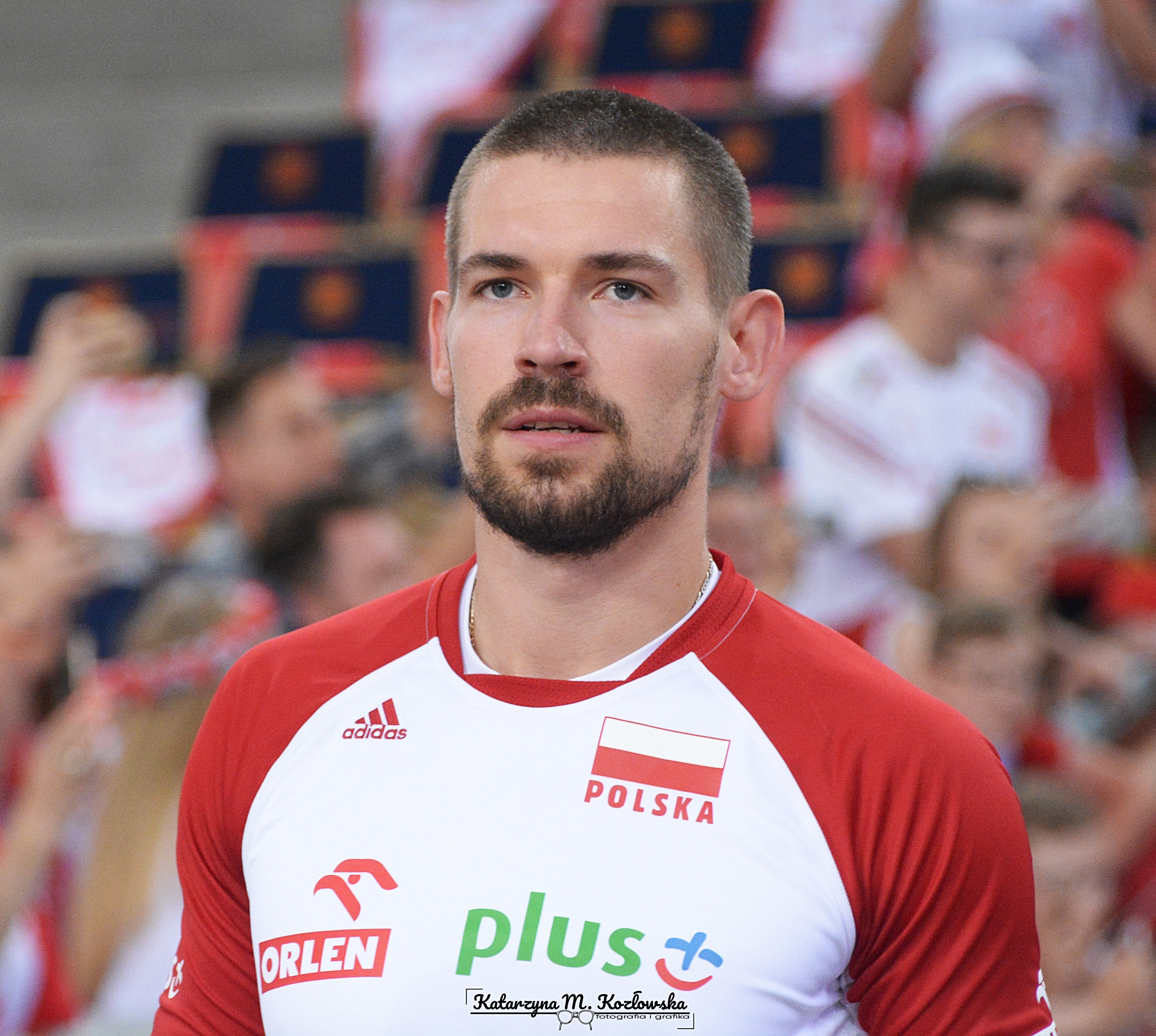
- Konarski in 2018

Personal information
- Full name: Dawid Andrzej Konarski
- Nickname: Konar
- Born: 31 August 1989 (age 37); Świecie, Poland
- Height: 1.98 m (6 ft 6 in)
- Weight: 101 kg (223 lb)
- Spike: 355 cm (140 in)

Volleyball information
- Position: Opposite
- Current club: Al Ahli

Career
Years	Teams
2008–2013; 2013–2015; 2015–2017; 2017–2018; 2018–2020; 2020–2021; 2021–2023; 2023–2024; 2024–2025; 2025–	Delecta Bydgoszcz; Asseco Resovia; ZAKSA Kędzierzyn-Koźle; Ziraat Bankası Ankara; Jastrzębski Węgiel; Czarni Radom; Warta Zawiercie; Skra Bełchatów; Al Nassr; Al Ahli

National team
2012–2021	Poland (110)
Honours
Men's volleyball
Representing Poland
FIVB World Championship
Gold medal – first place	2014 Poland
Gold medal – first place	2018 Bulgaria/Italy
FIVB World Cup
Bronze medal – third place	2015 Japan
CEV European Championship
Bronze medal – third place	2019 Belgium/France/Netherlands/Slovenia

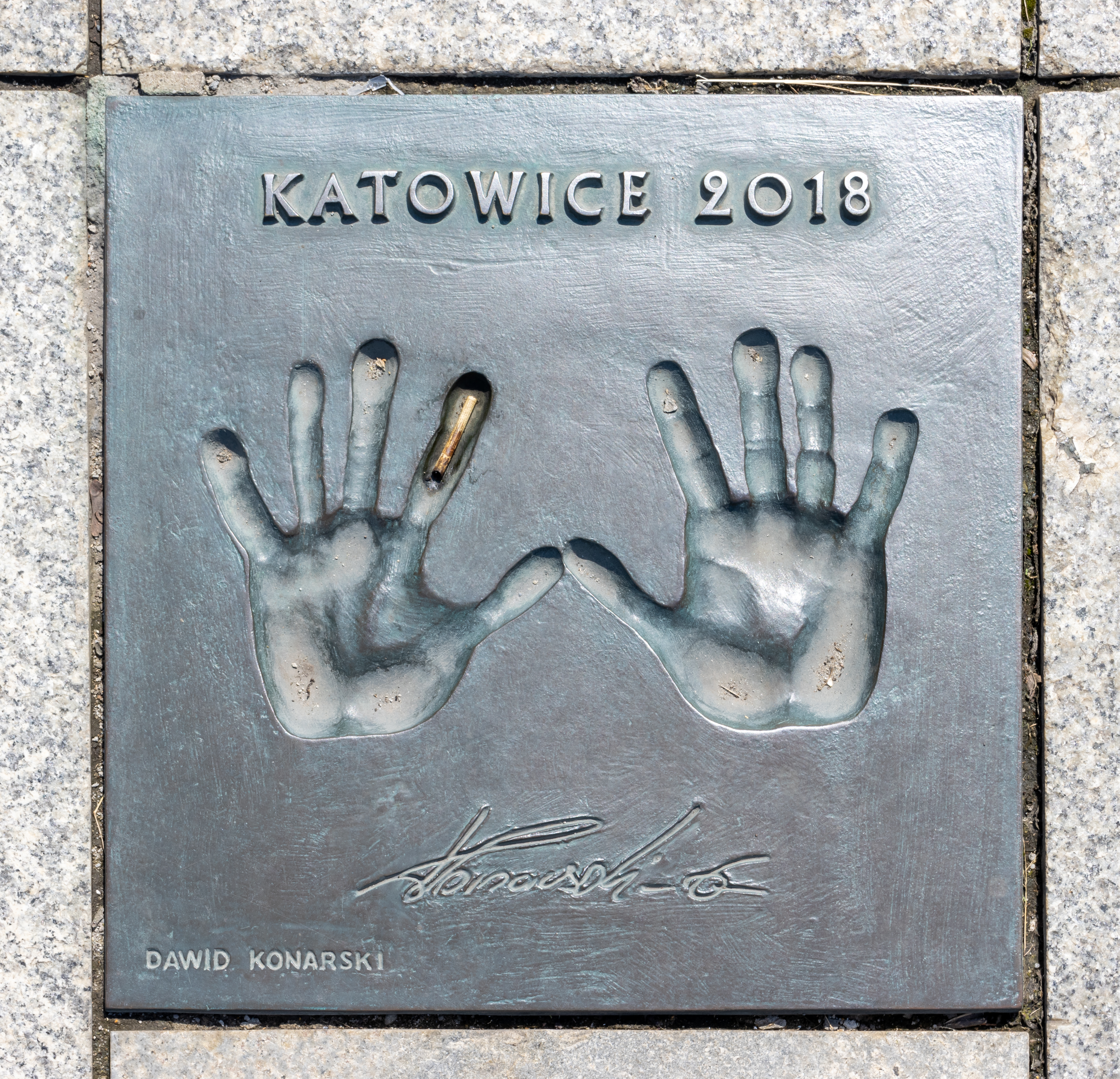
Hand prints and signature at the Avenue of Volleyball Stars, Katowice

Dawid Andrzej Konarski (born 31 August 1989) is a Polish professional volleyball player who plays as an opposite spiker for Al Ahli. He is a former member of the Poland national team, a participant in the Olympic Games Rio 2016, and a two–time World Champion (2014, 2018).

== Career ==
=== Club ===
In April 2015, Konarski moved to ZAKSA Kędzierzyn-Koźle.

=== National team ===
On 11 May 2012, Konarski debuted in the senior national team in a friendly match with Australia at Atlas Arena in Łódź. He played in the intercontinental round of the 2014 World League. On 16 August 2014, he was appointed to the national team for the 2014 World Championship held in Poland. On 21 September 2014, he won a title of the World Champion. On 27 October 2014, he received a state award granted by the Polish President Bronisław Komorowski – Gold Cross of Merit for outstanding sports achievements and worldwide promotion of Poland.

On 30 September 2018, Poland achieved its third title of the World Champions. Poland beat Brazil in the final 3–0 and defended the title from 2014.

== Honours ==
=== Club ===
- CEV Champions League
  - 2014–15 – with Asseco Resovia
- CEV Cup
  - 2017–18 – with Ziraat Bankası Ankara
- Domestic
  - 2013–14 Polish SuperCup, with Asseco Resovia
  - 2014–15 Polish Championship, with Asseco Resovia
  - 2015–16 Polish Championship, with ZAKSA Kędzierzyn-Koźle
  - 2016–17 Polish Cup, with ZAKSA Kędzierzyn-Koźle
  - 2016–17 Polish Championship, with ZAKSA Kędzierzyn-Koźle

=== Individual awards ===
- 2013: Polish SuperCup – Most valuable player
- 2017: Polish Cup – Best opposite
- 2017: Polish Cup – Most valuable player
- 2019: Polish Cup – Best server

=== State awards ===
- 2014: Gold Cross of Merit
- 2018: Knight's Cross of Polonia Restituta

=== Statistics ===
- 2012–13 PlusLiga – Best scorer (506 points)
- 2012–13 PlusLiga – Best spiker (423 points)
