= Benjamin Toniutti =

French volleyball player (born 1989)

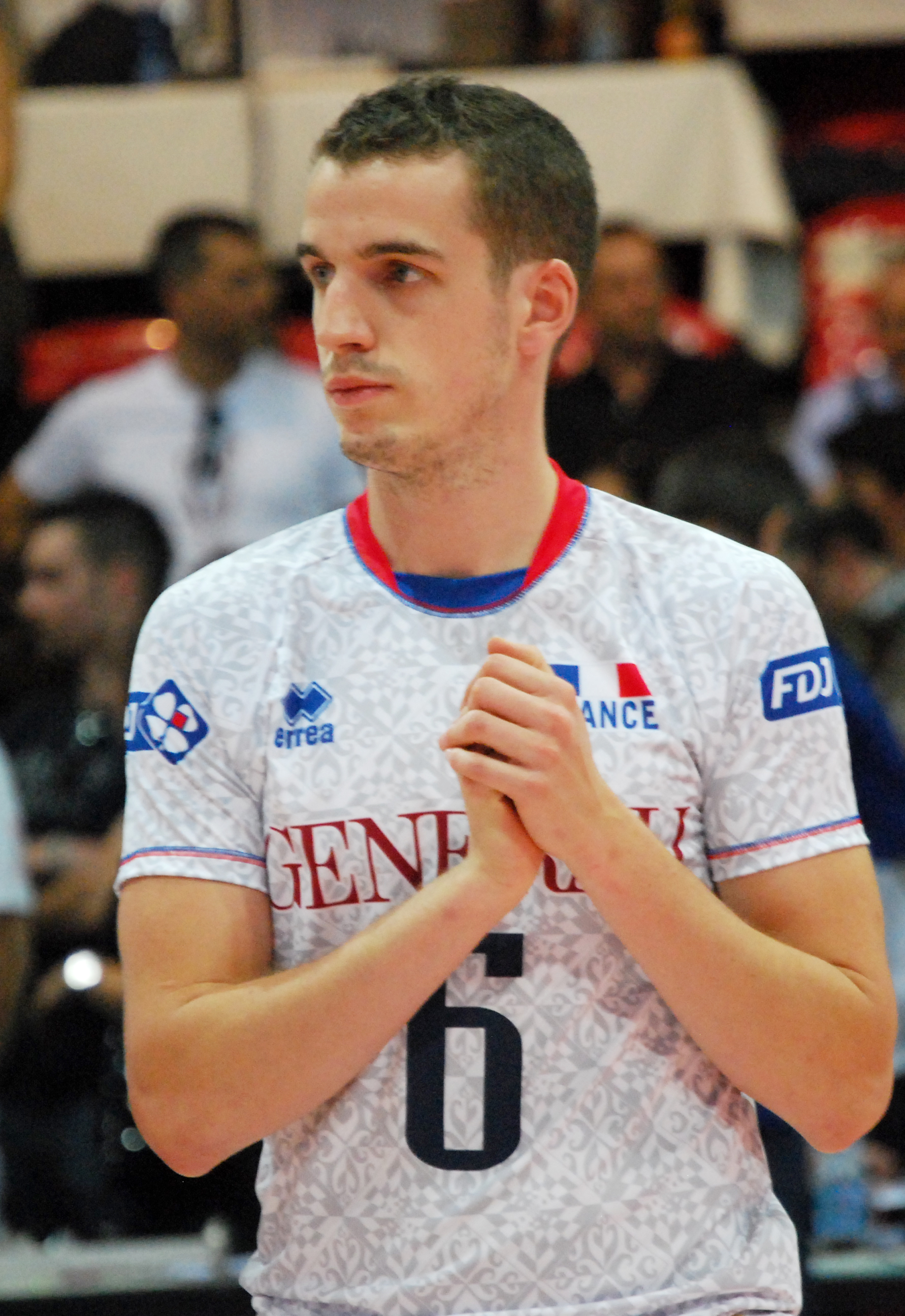
- Toniutti in 2013

Personal information
- Nickname: Totti, Ben
- Born: 30 October 1989 (age 36); Mulhouse, France
- Height: 1.83 m (6 ft 0 in)
- Weight: 75 kg (165 lb)
- Spike: 320 cm (126 in)
- Block: 310 cm (122 in)

Volleyball information
- Position: Setter
- Current club: Jastrzębski Węgiel
- Number: 6

Career
Years	Teams
2009–2013; 2013–2014; 2014; 2015; 2015–2021; 2021–2026	Arago de Sète; CMC Ravenna; Zenit Kazan; VfB Friedrichshafen; ZAKSA Kędzierzyn-Koźle; Jastrzębski Węgiel

National team
2010–2025	France
Honours
Men's volleyball
Representing France
Olympic Games
Gold medal – first place	2020 Tokyo	Team
Gold medal – first place	2024 Paris	Team
FIVB World League
Gold medal – first place	2015 Rio de Janeiro
Gold medal – first place	2017 Curitiba
Bronze medal – third place	2016 Kraków
FIVB Nations League
Gold medal – first place	2022 Bologna
Gold medal – first place	2024 Łódź
Silver medal – second place	2018 Lille
Bronze medal – third place	2021 Rimini
CEV European Championship
Gold medal – first place	2015 Bulgaria/Italy

Benjamin Toniutti (born 30 October 1989) is a French professional volleyball player who plays as a setter for Efeler Ligi club Ziraat Bankası S.K.. Toniutti won a gold medal in the men's tournament at the Olympic Games Tokyo 2020, and is the 2015 European Champion and the 2021 Champions League winner with ZAKSA.

== Personal life ==
Toniutti was born and raised in Alsace by his father Maurizio, an Italian French, and French mother Cathy. He is married to Emilie and has 3 daughters.

== Career ==
On 13 April 2015, Toniutti signed a contract with the Polish PlusLiga team, ZAKSA Kędzierzyn-Koźle. On 18 October 2015, the France national team, including him, won the 2015 European Champion title, beating Slovenia in the final. On 26 April 2016, he won his first Polish Champion title with ZAKSA. Toniutti won the 2015–16 PlusLiga Most valuable player award, and throughout the season received an individual MVP award 10 times. On 2 May 2016, it was announced that Toniutti extended his contract for the next two seasons (until 2018). On 9 July 2017, France won the World League after beating Brazil in the final. In 2018, ZAKSA extended the contract with Toniutti until 2019.

== Honours ==
=== Club ===
- CEV Champions League
  - 2020–21 – with ZAKSA Kędzierzyn-Koźle
  - 2022–23 – with Jastrzębski Węgiel
  - 2023–24 – with Jastrzębski Węgiel
- Domestic
  - 2014–15 German Cup, with VfB Friedrichshafen
  - 2014–15 German Championship, with VfB Friedrichshafen
  - 2015–16 Polish Championship, with ZAKSA Kędzierzyn-Koźle
  - 2016–17 Polish Cup, with ZAKSA Kędzierzyn-Koźle
  - 2016–17 Polish Championship, with ZAKSA Kędzierzyn-Koźle
  - 2018–19 Polish Cup, with ZAKSA Kędzierzyn-Koźle
  - 2018–19 Polish Championship, with ZAKSA Kędzierzyn-Koźle
  - 2019–20 Polish SuperCup, with ZAKSA Kędzierzyn-Koźle
  - 2020–21 Polish SuperCup, with ZAKSA Kędzierzyn-Koźle
  - 2020–21 Polish Cup, with ZAKSA Kędzierzyn-Koźle
  - 2021–22 Polish SuperCup, with Jastrzębski Węgiel
  - 2022–23 Polish SuperCup, with Jastrzębski Węgiel
  - 2022–23 Polish Championship, with Jastrzębski Węgiel
  - 2023–24 Polish Championship, with Jastrzębski Węgiel
  - 2024–25 Polish Cup, with Jastrzębski Węgiel

=== Youth national team ===
- 2006 CEV U20 European Championship
- 2007 CEV U19 European Championship
- 2008 CEV U20 European Championship

=== Individual awards ===
- 2007: CEV U19 European Championship – Best setter
- 2013: French Championship – Most valuable player
- 2013: French Championship – Best setter
- 2015: FIVB World League – Best setter
- 2016: Polish Cup – Best setter
- 2017: Polish Cup – Best setter
- 2017: FIVB World League – Best setter
- 2018: FIVB Nations League – Best setter
- 2019: Polish Cup – Best setter
- 2019: CEV European Championship – Best setter

=== State awards ===
- 2021: Knight of the Legion of Honour

Awards
Preceded by (Iran) Saeid Marouf	Best Setter of FIVB World League; 2015; 2017	Succeeded by FIVB Nations League
Preceded by First award	Best Setter of FIVB Nations League; 2018	Succeeded by (United States) Micah Christenson
Preceded by (Russia) Sergey Grankin	Best Setter of CEV European Championship; 2019	Succeeded by (Slovenia) Gregor Ropret
