= ZAKSA Kędzierzyn-Koźle squads =

This article shows the previous rosters of ZAKSA Kędzierzyn-Koźle volleyball team at PlusLiga in Poland.

== 2020/2021 ==
The following is the Grupa Azoty ZAKSA Kędzierzyn-Koźle roster in the 2020–21 PlusLiga.

| Head coach: | (Serbia) Nikola Grbić |
| Assistants: | (Poland) Adam Swaczyna, (Poland) Michał Chadała |

| No. | Name | Date of birth | Height | Weight | Spike | Position |
|---|---|---|---|---|---|---|
| 1 | (Poland) Paweł Zatorski | 21 June 1990 | 1.84 m (6 ft 0 in) | 73 kg (161 lb) | 328 cm (129 in) | libero |
| 2 | (Poland) Łukasz Kaczmarek | 29 June 1994 | 2.04 m (6 ft 8 in) | 102 kg (225 lb) | 354 cm (139 in) | opposite |
| 3 | (Poland) Jakub Kochanowski | 17 July 1997 | 1.99 m (6 ft 6 in) | 84 kg (185 lb) | 360 cm (140 in) | middle blocker |
| 4 | (Poland) Krzysztof Rejno | 22 February 1993 | 2.03 m (6 ft 8 in) | 87 kg (192 lb) | 355 cm (140 in) | middle blocker |
| 6 | (France) Benjamin Toniutti (C) | 30 October 1989 | 1.83 m (6 ft 0 in) | 74 kg (163 lb) | 333 cm (131 in) | setter |
| 7 | (Poland) Piotr Łukasik | 11 July 1994 | 2.08 m (6 ft 10 in) | 112 kg (247 lb) | 350 cm (140 in) | outside hitter |
| 8 | (Poland) Adrian Staszewski | 31 May 1990 | 1.96 m (6 ft 5 in) | 103 kg (227 lb) | 340 cm (130 in) | outside hitter |
| 9 | (Poland) Bartłomiej Kluth | 20 December 1992 | 2.10 m (6 ft 11 in) | 109 kg (240 lb) | 357 cm (141 in) | opposite |
| 11 | (Poland) Aleksander Śliwka | 24 May 1995 | 1.98 m (6 ft 6 in) | 83 kg (183 lb) | 342 cm (135 in) | outside hitter |
| 13 | (Poland) Kamil Semeniuk | 16 July 1996 | 1.94 m (6 ft 4 in) | 85 kg (187 lb) | 350 cm (140 in) | outside hitter |
| 15 | (United States) David Smith | 15 May 1985 | 2.01 m (6 ft 7 in) | 91 kg (201 lb) | 348 cm (137 in) | middle blocker |
| 17 | (Poland) Rafał Prokopczuk | 23 March 1999 | 0 m (0 in) | 0 kg (0 lb) | 0 cm (0 in) | setter |
| 66 | (Poland) Mateusz Zawalski | 7 February 1995 | 1.97 m (6 ft 6 in) | 97 kg (214 lb) | 347 cm (137 in) | middle blocker |
| 71 | (Poland) Korneliusz Banach | 25 January 1994 | 1.84 m (6 ft 0 in) | 69 kg (152 lb) | 315 cm (124 in) | libero |

== 2019/2020 ==
The following is the Grupa Azoty ZAKSA Kędzierzyn-Koźle roster in the 2019–20 PlusLiga.

| Head coach: | (Serbia) Nikola Grbić |
| Assistants: | (Poland) Adam Swaczyna, (Poland) Michał Chadała |

| No. | Name | Date of birth | Height | Weight | Spike | Position |
|---|---|---|---|---|---|---|
| 1 | (Poland) Paweł Zatorski | 21 June 1990 | 1.84 m (6 ft 0 in) | 73 kg (161 lb) | 328 cm (129 in) | libero |
| 2 | (Poland) Łukasz Kaczmarek | 29 June 1994 | 2.04 m (6 ft 8 in) | 102 kg (225 lb) | 354 cm (139 in) | opposite |
| 3 | (Italy) Simone Parodi | 16 June 1986 | 1.96 m (6 ft 5 in) | 95 kg (209 lb) | 350 cm (140 in) | outside hitter |
| 4 | (Poland) Przemysław Stępień | 7 February 1994 | 1.85 m (6 ft 1 in) | 82 kg (181 lb) | 335 cm (132 in) | setter |
| 6 | (France) Benjamin Toniutti (C) | 30 October 1989 | 1.83 m (6 ft 0 in) | 74 kg (163 lb) | 333 cm (131 in) | setter |
| 7 | (Poland) Piotr Łukasik | 11 July 1994 | 2.08 m (6 ft 10 in) | 112 kg (247 lb) | 350 cm (140 in) | outside hitter |
| 8 | (Poland) Sławomir Jungiewicz | 21 June 1989 | 1.96 m (6 ft 5 in) | 95 kg (209 lb) | 360 cm (140 in) | opposite |
| 9 | (Poland) Łukasz Wiśniewski | 3 February 1989 | 1.98 m (6 ft 6 in) | 104 kg (229 lb) | 343 cm (135 in) | middle blocker |
| 11 | (Poland) Aleksander Śliwka | 24 May 1995 | 1.98 m (6 ft 6 in) | 83 kg (183 lb) | 342 cm (135 in) | outside hitter |
| 12 | (Poland) Sebastian Warda | 18 January 1989 | 2.04 m (6 ft 8 in) | 104 kg (229 lb) | 355 cm (140 in) | middle blocker |
| 13 | (Poland) Kamil Semeniuk | 16 July 1996 | 1.94 m (6 ft 4 in) | 85 kg (187 lb) | 350 cm (140 in) | outside hitter |
| 14 | (Hungary) Árpád Baróti | 23 October 1991 | 2.05 m (6 ft 9 in) | 89 kg (196 lb) | 340 cm (130 in) | opposite |
| 15 | (United States) David Smith | 15 May 1985 | 2.01 m (6 ft 7 in) | 91 kg (201 lb) | 348 cm (137 in) | middle blocker |
| 16 | (Poland) Krzysztof Rejno | 22 February 1993 | 2.03 m (6 ft 8 in) | 87 kg (192 lb) | 355 cm (140 in) | middle blocker |
| 18 | (Poland) Adam Smolarczyk | 12 May 1994 | 2.04 m (6 ft 8 in) | 101 lb (46 kg) | 356 cm (140 in) | outside hitter |
| 19 | (Poland) Filip Grygiel | 12 February 2000 | 2.01 m (6 ft 7 in) | 98 kg (216 lb) | 360 cm (140 in) | opposite |
| 71 | (Poland) Korneliusz Banach | 25 January 1994 | 1.84 m (6 ft 0 in) | 69 kg (152 lb) | 315 cm (124 in) | libero |

== 2018/2019 ==
The following is the ZAKSA Kędzierzyn-Koźle roster in the 2018–19 PlusLiga.

| Head coach: | (Italy) Andrea Gardini |
| Assistant: | (Poland) Michał Chadała |

| No. | Name | Date of birth | Height | Weight | Spike | Position |
|---|---|---|---|---|---|---|
| 1 | (Poland) Paweł Zatorski | 21 June 1990 | 1.84 m (6 ft 0 in) | 73 kg (161 lb) | 328 cm (129 in) | libero |
| 2 | (Poland) Łukasz Kaczmarek | 29 June 1994 | 2.04 m (6 ft 8 in) | 102 kg (225 lb) | 354 cm (139 in) | opposite |
| 4 | (Poland) Przemysław Stępień | 7 February 1994 | 1.85 m (6 ft 1 in) | 82 kg (181 lb) | 335 cm (132 in) | setter |
| 5 | (United States) James Shaw | 5 March 1994 | 2.03 m (6 ft 8 in) | 101 kg (223 lb) | 354 cm (139 in) | opposite |
| 6 | (France) Benjamin Toniutti (C) | 30 October 1989 | 1.83 m (6 ft 0 in) | 74 kg (163 lb) | 333 cm (131 in) | setter |
| 8 | (Poland) Sławomir Jungiewicz | 21 June 1989 | 1.96 m (6 ft 5 in) | 95 kg (209 lb) | 360 cm (140 in) | opposite |
| 9 | (Poland) Łukasz Wiśniewski | 3 February 1989 | 1.98 m (6 ft 6 in) | 104 kg (229 lb) | 343 cm (135 in) | middle blocker |
| 10 | (Poland) Mateusz Bieniek | 5 April 1994 | 2.08 m (6 ft 10 in) | 98 kg (216 lb) | 351 cm (138 in) | middle blocker |
| 11 | (Poland) Aleksander Śliwka | 24 May 1995 | 1.98 m (6 ft 6 in) | 83 kg (183 lb) | 342 cm (135 in) | outside hitter |
| 12 | (Canada) Brandon Koppers | 9 September 1995 | 2.02 m (6 ft 8 in) | 90 kg (200 lb) | 345 cm (136 in) | outside hitter |
| 13 | (Poland) Rafał Szymura | 29 August 1995 | 1.97 m (6 ft 6 in) | 102 kg (225 lb) | 345 cm (136 in) | outside hitter |
| 15 | (Belgium) Sam Deroo | 24 April 1992 | 2.03 m (6 ft 8 in) | 92 kg (203 lb) | 360 cm (140 in) | outside hitter |
| 16 | (Poland) Tomasz Kalembka | 30 June 1991 | 2.05 m (6 ft 9 in) | 103 kg (227 lb) | 340 cm (130 in) | middle blocker |
| 17 | (Poland) Mateusz Sacharewicz | 23 October 1989 | 1.98 m (6 ft 6 in) | 94 kg (207 lb) | 350 cm (140 in) | middle blocker |
| 20 | (Poland) Kamil Szymura | 24 January 1999 | 1.85 m (6 ft 1 in) | 80 kg (180 lb) | 320 cm (130 in) | libero |

== 2017/2018 ==
The following is the ZAKSA Kędzierzyn-Koźle roster in the 2017–18 PlusLiga.

| Head coach: | (Italy) Andrea Gardini |
| Assistant: | (Poland) Michał Chadała |

| No. | Name | Date of birth | Height | Weight | Spike | Position |
|---|---|---|---|---|---|---|
| 1 | (Poland) Paweł Zatorski | 21 June 1990 | 1.84 m (6 ft 0 in) | 73 kg (161 lb) | 328 cm (129 in) | libero |
| 3 | (Poland) Rafał Szymura | 29 August 1995 | 1.97 m (6 ft 6 in) | 102 kg (225 lb) | 345 cm (136 in) | outside hitter |
| 4 | (Poland) Krzysztof Rejno | 22 February 1993 | 2.03 m (6 ft 8 in) | 87 kg (192 lb) | 355 cm (140 in) | middle blocker |
| 5 | (Italy) Marco Falaschi | 18 September 1987 | 1.87 m (6 ft 2 in) | 73 kg (161 lb) | 325 cm (128 in) | setter |
| 6 | (France) Benjamin Toniutti (C) | 30 October 1989 | 1.83 m (6 ft 0 in) | 74 kg (163 lb) | 333 cm (131 in) | setter |
| 7 | (Poland) Rafał Buszek | 28 April 1987 | 1.96 m (6 ft 5 in) | 88 kg (194 lb) | 348 cm (137 in) | outside hitter |
| 8 | (Poland) Sławomir Jungiewicz | 21 June 1989 | 1.96 m (6 ft 5 in) | 95 kg (209 lb) | 360 cm (140 in) | opposite |
| 9 | (Poland) Łukasz Wiśniewski | 3 February 1989 | 1.98 m (6 ft 6 in) | 104 kg (229 lb) | 343 cm (135 in) | middle blocker |
| 10 | (Poland) Mateusz Bieniek | 5 April 1994 | 2.08 m (6 ft 10 in) | 98 kg (216 lb) | 351 cm (138 in) | middle blocker |
| 11 | (Puerto Rico) Maurice Torres | 6 July 1991 | 2.01 m (6 ft 7 in) | 98 kg (216 lb) | 345 cm (136 in) | opposite |
| 12 | (Poland) Krzysztof Zapłacki | 8 August 1993 | 1.97 m (6 ft 6 in) | 84 kg (185 lb) | 340 cm (130 in) | outside hitter |
| 13 | (Poland) Kamil Semeniuk | 16 July 1996 | 1.94 m (6 ft 4 in) | 85 kg (187 lb) | 350 cm (140 in) | outside hitter |
| 15 | (Belgium) Sam Deroo | 24 April 1992 | 2.03 m (6 ft 8 in) | 92 kg (203 lb) | 360 cm (140 in) | outside hitter |
| 17 | (Poland) Aleksander Maziarz | 22 April 1995 | 2.04 m (6 ft 8 in) | 84 kg (185 lb) | 350 cm (140 in) | middle blocker |
| 18 | (Poland) Korneliusz Banach | 25 January 1994 | 1.84 m (6 ft 0 in) | 69 kg (152 lb) | 315 cm (124 in) | libero |

== 2016/2017 ==
The following is the ZAKSA Kędzierzyn-Koźle roster in the 2016–17 PlusLiga.

| Head coach: | (Italy) Ferdinando De Giorgi |
| Assistants: | (Poland) Michał Chadała, (Poland) Oskar Kaczmarczyk |

| No. | Name | Date of birth | Height | Weight | Spike | Position |
|---|---|---|---|---|---|---|
| 1 | (Poland) Paweł Zatorski (C) | 21 June 1990 | 1.84 m (6 ft 0 in) | 73 kg (161 lb) | 328 cm (129 in) | libero |
| 2 | (France) Kévin Tillie | 2 November 1990 | 2.00 m (6 ft 7 in) | 85 kg (187 lb) | 345 cm (136 in) | outside hitter |
| 3 | (Poland) Dominik Witczak | 2 January 1983 | 1.98 m (6 ft 6 in) | 105 kg (231 lb) | 340 cm (130 in) | opposite |
| 6 | (Poland) Dawid Konarski | 31 August 1989 | 1.98 m (6 ft 6 in) | 101 kg (223 lb) | 355 cm (140 in) | opposite |
| 7 | (Poland) Rafał Buszek | 28 April 1987 | 1.96 m (6 ft 5 in) | 88 kg (194 lb) | 348 cm (137 in) | outside hitter |
| 9 | (Poland) Łukasz Wiśniewski | 3 February 1989 | 1.98 m (6 ft 6 in) | 104 kg (229 lb) | 343 cm (135 in) | middle blocker |
| 10 | (Poland) Mateusz Bieniek | 5 April 1994 | 2.08 m (6 ft 10 in) | 98 kg (216 lb) | 351 cm (138 in) | middle blocker |
| 12 | (Poland) Grzegorz Bociek | 6 June 1991 | 2.07 m (6 ft 9 in) | 107 kg (236 lb) | 367 cm (144 in) | opposite |
| 13 | (Poland) Kamil Semeniuk | 16 July 1996 | 1.94 m (6 ft 4 in) | 85 kg (187 lb) | 350 cm (140 in) | outside hitter |
| 14 | (Poland) Grzegorz Pająk | 1 January 1987 | 1.96 m (6 ft 5 in) | 94 kg (207 lb) | 349 cm (137 in) | setter |
| 15 | (Belgium) Sam Deroo | 24 April 1992 | 2.03 m (6 ft 8 in) | 92 kg (203 lb) | 360 cm (140 in) | outside hitter |
| 16 | (France) Benjamin Toniutti (C) | 30 October 1989 | 1.83 m (6 ft 0 in) | 74 kg (163 lb) | 333 cm (131 in) | setter |
| 18 | (Poland) Korneliusz Banach | 25 January 1994 | 1.84 m (6 ft 0 in) | 69 kg (152 lb) | 315 cm (124 in) | libero |
| 19 | (Poland) Patryk Czarnowski | 1 November 1985 | 2.04 m (6 ft 8 in) | 98 kg (216 lb) | 365 cm (144 in) | middle blocker |

== 2015/2016 ==
The following is the ZAKSA Kędzierzyn-Koźle roster in the 2015–16 PlusLiga.

| Head coach: | (Italy) Ferdinando De Giorgi |
| Assistant: | (Poland) Oskar Kaczmarczyk |

| No. | Name | Date of birth | Height | Weight | Spike | Position |
|---|---|---|---|---|---|---|
| 1 | (Poland) Paweł Zatorski (C) | 21 June 1990 | 1.84 m (6 ft 0 in) | 73 kg (161 lb) | 328 cm (129 in) | libero |
| 2 | (France) Kévin Tillie | 2 November 1990 | 2.00 m (6 ft 7 in) | 85 kg (187 lb) | 345 cm (136 in) | outside hitter |
| 4 | (Poland) Krzysztof Rejno | 22 February 1993 | 2.03 m (6 ft 8 in) | 87 kg (192 lb) | 355 cm (140 in) | middle blocker |
| 6 | (Poland) Dawid Konarski | 31 August 1989 | 1.98 m (6 ft 6 in) | 101 kg (223 lb) | 355 cm (140 in) | opposite |
| 7 | (Poland) Rafał Buszek | 28 April 1987 | 1.96 m (6 ft 5 in) | 88 kg (194 lb) | 348 cm (137 in) | outside hitter |
| 8 | (Poland) Yuriy Gladyr | 8 July 1984 | 2.02 m (6 ft 8 in) | 96 kg (212 lb) | 360 cm (140 in) | middle blocker |
| 9 | (Poland) Łukasz Wiśniewski | 3 February 1989 | 1.98 m (6 ft 6 in) | 104 kg (229 lb) | 343 cm (135 in) | middle blocker |
| 12 | (Poland) Grzegorz Bociek | 6 June 1991 | 2.07 m (6 ft 9 in) | 107 kg (236 lb) | 367 cm (144 in) | opposite |
| 13 | (Poland) Kamil Semeniuk | 16 July 1996 | 1.94 m (6 ft 4 in) | 85 kg (187 lb) | 350 cm (140 in) | outside hitter |
| 14 | (Poland) Grzegorz Pająk | 1 January 1987 | 1.96 m (6 ft 5 in) | 94 kg (207 lb) | 349 cm (137 in) | setter |
| 15 | (Belgium) Sam Deroo | 24 April 1992 | 2.03 m (6 ft 8 in) | 92 kg (203 lb) | 360 cm (140 in) | outside hitter |
| 16 | (France) Benjamin Toniutti (C) | 30 October 1989 | 1.83 m (6 ft 0 in) | 74 kg (163 lb) | 333 cm (131 in) | setter |
| 18 | (Poland) Korneliusz Banach | 25 January 1994 | 1.84 m (6 ft 0 in) | 69 kg (152 lb) | 315 cm (124 in) | libero |
| 19 | (Poland) Patryk Czarnowski | 1 November 1985 | 2.04 m (6 ft 8 in) | 98 kg (216 lb) | 365 cm (144 in) | middle blocker |

== 2014/2015 ==
The following is the ZAKSA Kędzierzyn-Koźle roster in the 2014–15 PlusLiga.

| Head coach: | (Poland) Sebastian Świderski |
| Assistants: | (Poland) Michał Chadała, (Poland) Piotr Pietrzak |

| No. | Name | Date of birth | Height | Weight | Spike | Position |
|---|---|---|---|---|---|---|
| 1 | (Poland) Paweł Zatorski | 21 June 1990 | 1.84 m (6 ft 0 in) | 73 kg (161 lb) | 328 cm (129 in) | libero |
| 2 | (Netherlands) Nimir Abdel-Aziz | 5 February 1992 | 2.01 m (6 ft 7 in) | 83 kg (183 lb) | 356 cm (140 in) | setter |
| 3 | (Poland) Dominik Witczak | 2 January 1983 | 1.98 m (6 ft 6 in) | 105 kg (231 lb) | 340 cm (130 in) | opposite |
| 4 | (Poland) Krzysztof Rejno | 22 February 1993 | 2.03 m (6 ft 8 in) | 87 kg (192 lb) | 355 cm (140 in) | middle blocker |
| 5 | (Poland) Paweł Zagumny | 18 October 1977 | 2.00 m (6 ft 7 in) | 90 kg (200 lb) | 330 cm (130 in) | setter |
| 6 | (Poland) Krzysztof Zapłacki | 8 August 1993 | 1.97 m (6 ft 6 in) | 84 kg (185 lb) | 340 cm (130 in) | outside hitter |
| 7 | (Brazil) Lucas Lóh | 18 January 1991 | 1.95 m (6 ft 5 in) | 83 kg (183 lb) | 347 cm (137 in) | outside hitter |
| 8 | (Poland) Yuriy Gladyr | 8 July 1984 | 2.02 m (6 ft 8 in) | 96 kg (212 lb) | 360 cm (140 in) | middle blocker |
| 9 | (Poland) Łukasz Wiśniewski | 3 February 1989 | 1.98 m (6 ft 6 in) | 104 kg (229 lb) | 343 cm (135 in) | middle blocker |
| 11 | (Netherlands) Dick Kooy | 3 December 1987 | 2.02 m (6 ft 8 in) | 80 kg (180 lb) | 360 cm (140 in) | outside hitter |
| 12 | (Poland) Grzegorz Bociek | 6 June 1991 | 2.07 m (6 ft 9 in) | 107 kg (236 lb) | 367 cm (144 in) | opposite |
| 14 | (Poland) Paweł Gryc | 9 January 1996 | 2.08 m (6 ft 10 in) | 113 kg (249 lb) | 355 cm (140 in) | outside hitter |
| 14 | (Netherlands) Kay van Dijk | 25 June 1984 | 2.14 m (7 ft 0 in) | 0 kg (0 lb) | 0 cm (0 in) | opposite |
| 16 | (Poland) Michał Ruciak (C) | 22 August 1983 | 1.90 m (6 ft 3 in) | 82 kg (181 lb) | 336 cm (132 in) | outside hitter |
| 17 | (Poland) Wojciech Kaźmierczak | 11 June 1982 | 0 m (0 in) | 0 kg (0 lb) | 0 cm (0 in) | middle blocker |

== 2013/2014 ==
The following is the ZAKSA Kędzierzyn-Koźle roster in the 2013–14 PlusLiga.

| Head coach: | (Poland) Sebastian Świderski |
| Assistant: | (Poland) Oskar Kaczmarczyk |

| No. | Name | Date of birth | Height | Weight | Spike | Position |
|---|---|---|---|---|---|---|
| 3 | (Poland) Dominik Witczak | 2 January 1983 | 1.98 m (6 ft 6 in) | 105 kg (231 lb) | 340 cm (130 in) | opposite |
| 5 | (Poland) Paweł Zagumny | 18 October 1977 | 2.00 m (6 ft 7 in) | 90 kg (200 lb) | 330 cm (130 in) | setter |
| 6 | (Canada) Daniel Lewis | 3 April 1976 | 1.89 m (6 ft 2 in) | 90 kg (200 lb) | 340 cm (130 in) | outside hitter |
| 7 | (Poland) Grzegorz Pilarz | 12 February 1980 | 1.88 m (6 ft 2 in) | 80 kg (180 lb) | 320 cm (130 in) | setter |
| 8 | (Poland) Yuriy Gladyr | 8 July 1984 | 2.02 m (6 ft 8 in) | 96 kg (212 lb) | 360 cm (140 in) | middle blocker |
| 9 | (Poland) Łukasz Wiśniewski | 3 February 1989 | 1.98 m (6 ft 6 in) | 104 kg (229 lb) | 343 cm (135 in) | middle blocker |
| 10 | (Poland) Wojciech Ferens | 5 April 1991 | 1.94 m (6 ft 4 in) | 96 kg (212 lb) | 358 cm (141 in) | outside hitter |
| 11 | (Netherlands) Dick Kooy | 3 December 1987 | 2.02 m (6 ft 8 in) | 80 kg (180 lb) | 360 cm (140 in) | outside hitter |
| 12 | (Poland) Grzegorz Bociek | 6 June 1991 | 2.07 m (6 ft 9 in) | 107 kg (236 lb) | 367 cm (144 in) | opposite |
| 15 | (Poland) Piotr Gacek | 16 September 1978 | 1.85 m (6 ft 1 in) | 80 kg (180 lb) | 0 cm (0 in) | libero |
| 16 | (Poland) Michał Ruciak (C) | 22 August 1983 | 1.90 m (6 ft 3 in) | 82 kg (181 lb) | 336 cm (132 in) | outside hitter |
| 17 | (Poland) Marcin Możdżonek | 9 February 1985 | 2.11 m (6 ft 11 in) | 104 kg (229 lb) | 360 cm (140 in) | middle blocker |
| 18 | (Canada) Dustin Schneider | 27 February 1985 | 0 m (0 in) | 0 kg (0 lb) | 0 cm (0 in) | setter |

== 2012/2013 ==
The following is the ZAKSA Kędzierzyn-Koźle roster in the 2012–13 PlusLiga.

| Head coach: | (Argentina) Daniel Castellani |
| Assistant: | (Poland) Sebastian Świderski |

| No. | Name | Date of birth | Height | Weight | Spike | Position |
|---|---|---|---|---|---|---|
| 1 | (Ukraine) Serhiy Kapelus | 22 October 1982 | 1.91 m (6 ft 3 in) | 86 kg (190 lb) | 345 cm (136 in) | outside hitter |
| 2 | (Poland) Łukasz Koziura | 8 June 1992 | 0 m (0 in) | 0 kg (0 lb) | 0 cm (0 in) | libero |
| 3 | (Poland) Dominik Witczak | 2 January 1983 | 1.98 m (6 ft 6 in) | 105 kg (231 lb) | 340 cm (130 in) | opposite |
| 4 | (France) Antonin Rouzier | 18 August 1986 | 2.01 m (6 ft 7 in) | 97 kg (214 lb) | 350 cm (140 in) | opposite |
| 5 | (Poland) Paweł Zagumny (C) | 18 October 1977 | 2.00 m (6 ft 7 in) | 90 kg (200 lb) | 330 cm (130 in) | setter |
| 6 | (Poland) Krzysztof Zapłacki | 8 August 1993 | 1.97 m (6 ft 6 in) | 84 kg (185 lb) | 340 cm (130 in) | outside hitter |
| 7 | (Poland) Grzegorz Pilarz | 12 February 1980 | 1.88 m (6 ft 2 in) | 80 kg (180 lb) | 320 cm (130 in) | setter |
| 8 | (Ukraine) (Poland) Yuriy Gladyr | 8 July 1984 | 2.02 m (6 ft 8 in) | 96 kg (212 lb) | 360 cm (140 in) | middle blocker |
| 9 | (Poland) Łukasz Wiśniewski | 3 February 1989 | 1.98 m (6 ft 6 in) | 104 kg (229 lb) | 343 cm (135 in) | middle blocker |
| 10 | (Poland) Maciej Polański | 18 December 1993 | 2.00 m (6 ft 7 in) | 90 kg (200 lb) | 350 cm (140 in) | middle blocker |
| 11 | (Dominican Republic) Elvis Contreras | 20 July 1979 | 1.88 m (6 ft 2 in) | 94 kg (207 lb) | 363 cm (143 in) | outside hitter |
| 12 | (Brazil) Felipe Fonteles | 19 June 1984 | 1.98 m (6 ft 6 in) | 96 kg (212 lb) | 0 cm (0 in) | outside hitter |
| 13 | (Brazil) Rogerio Nogueira | 30 June 1988 | 2.03 m (6 ft 8 in) | 0 kg (0 lb) | 0 cm (0 in) | outside hitter |
| 14 | (Poland) Mateusz Kamiński | 30 September 1992 | 2.01 m (6 ft 7 in) | 0 kg (0 lb) | 0 cm (0 in) | setter |
| 15 | (Poland) Piotr Gacek | 16 September 1978 | 1.85 m (6 ft 1 in) | 80 kg (180 lb) | 0 cm (0 in) | libero |
| 16 | (Poland) Michał Ruciak | 22 August 1983 | 1.90 m (6 ft 3 in) | 82 kg (181 lb) | 336 cm (132 in) | outside hitter |
| 17 | (Poland) Marcin Możdżonek | 9 February 1985 | 2.11 m (6 ft 11 in) | 104 kg (229 lb) | 360 cm (140 in) | middle blocker |

== 2011/2012 ==
The following is the ZAKSA Kędzierzyn-Koźle roster in the 2011–12 PlusLiga.

| Head coach: | (Poland) Krzysztof Stelmach |
| Assistant: | (Poland) Andrzej Kubacki |

| No. | Name | Date of birth | Height | Weight | Spike | Position |
|---|---|---|---|---|---|---|
| 1 | (Ukraine) Serhiy Kapelus | 22 October 1982 | 1.91 m (6 ft 3 in) | 86 kg (190 lb) | 345 cm (136 in) | outside hitter |
| 2 | (Czech Republic) Jiří Popelka | 11 May 1977 | 2.04 m (6 ft 8 in) | 98 kg (216 lb) | 352 cm (139 in) | outside hitter |
| 3 | (Poland) Dominik Witczak | 2 January 1983 | 1.98 m (6 ft 6 in) | 105 kg (231 lb) | 340 cm (130 in) | opposite |
| 4 | (France) Antonin Rouzier | 18 August 1986 | 2.01 m (6 ft 7 in) | 97 kg (214 lb) | 350 cm (140 in) | opposite |
| 5 | (Poland) Paweł Zagumny (C) | 18 October 1977 | 2.00 m (6 ft 7 in) | 90 kg (200 lb) | 330 cm (130 in) | setter |
| 7 | (Poland) Grzegorz Pilarz | 12 February 1980 | 1.88 m (6 ft 2 in) | 80 kg (180 lb) | 320 cm (130 in) | setter |
| 8 | (Ukraine) Yuriy Gladyr | 8 July 1984 | 2.02 m (6 ft 8 in) | 96 kg (212 lb) | 360 cm (140 in) | middle blocker |
| 9 | (Poland) Patryk Czarnowski | 1 November 1985 | 2.04 m (6 ft 8 in) | 98 kg (216 lb) | 365 cm (144 in) | middle blocker |
| 10 | (France) Guillaume Samica | 28 September 1981 | 1.97 m (6 ft 6 in) | 88 kg (194 lb) | 350 cm (140 in) | outside hitter |
| 11 | (Poland) Sebastian Warda | 18 January 1989 | 2.04 m (6 ft 8 in) | 104 kg (229 lb) | 355 cm (140 in) | middle blocker |
| 12 | (Poland) Wojciech Kaźmierczak | 11 June 1982 | 0 m (0 in) | 0 kg (0 lb) | 0 cm (0 in) | middle blocker |
| 13 | (Poland) Sebastian Świderski | 26 June 1977 | 1.93 m (6 ft 4 in) | 93 kg (205 lb) | 345 cm (136 in) | outside hitter |
| 15 | (Poland) Piotr Gacek | 16 September 1978 | 1.85 m (6 ft 1 in) | 80 kg (180 lb) | 0 cm (0 in) | libero |
| 16 | (Poland) Michał Ruciak | 22 August 1983 | 1.90 m (6 ft 3 in) | 82 kg (181 lb) | 336 cm (132 in) | outside hitter |
