= Dominik Witczak =

Polish volleyball player (born 1983)

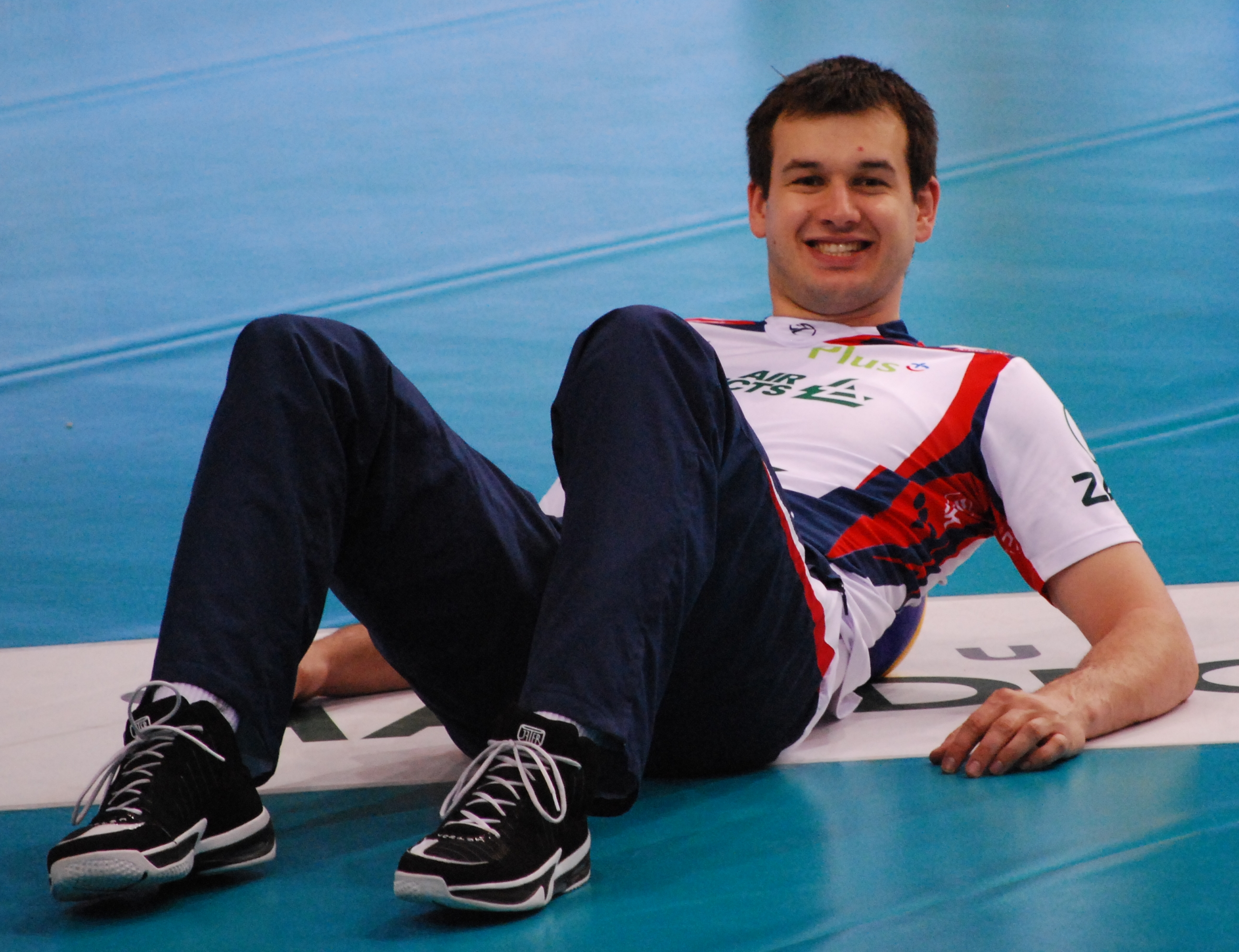
- Witczak in 2010

Personal information
- Full name: Dominik Witczak
- Nationality: Polish
- Born: January 2, 1983 (age 43); Ostrów Wielkopolski, Poland
- Height: 1.98 m (6 ft 6 in)
- Weight: 102 kg (225 lb)
- Spike: 340 cm (130 in)
- Block: 321 cm (126 in)

Volleyball information
- Position: Opposite
- Number: 3

Career
Years	Teams
2004–2007; 2007–2008; 2008–2015; 2015–2016; 2016–2017; 2017–2018	SPS Zduńska Wola; Skra II Bełchatów; PGE Skra Bełchatów; ZAKSA Kędzierzyn-Koźle; Asseco Resovia Rzeszów; ZAKSA Kędzierzyn-Koźle; GKS Katowice

National team
2014–	Poland
- Last updated: 24 May 2018

Dominik Witczak (born 2 January 1983) is a former Polish volleyball player, a member of Poland men's national volleyball team, Polish Champion (2008, 2017).

== Personal life ==
Witczak was born in Ostrów Wielkopolski, Poland. He is married to Anna (née Woźniakowska), who is a former volleyball player. On October 28, 2013 his wife gave birth to their son Antoni.

== Career ==
=== Clubs ===
In 2008 moved to ZAKSA Kędzierzyn-Koźle. In 2014 signed new contract with his current club to next 3 seasons. On November 28, 28 after 7th round of regular season in 2015–16 PlusLiga was announced that Witczak played last match in ZAKSA Kędzierzyn-Koźle. He went to Asseco Resovia Rzeszów, because of Jochen Schops injury.

=== National team ===
He was appointed to the Polish national team in 2014 by head coach Stephane Antiga.

== Sporting achievements ==
=== Beach volleyball ===
- 2006 Polish Championship, with Damian Lisiecki
- 2008 Polish Championship, with Damian Lisiecki
- 2009 Polish Championship, with Damian Lisiecki
- 2009 Polish Cup, with Damian Lisiecki
- 2010 Polish Championship, with Grzegorz Kliml
- 2010 Polish Cup, with Grzegorz Kliml

=== Clubs ===
==== National championships ====
- 2007/2008 Polish Championship, with PGE Skra Bełchatów
- 2010/2011 Polish Championship, with ZAKSA Kędzierzyn-Koźle
- 2011/2012 Polish Championship, with ZAKSA Kędzierzyn-Koźle
- 2012/2013 Polish Cup, with ZAKSA Kędzierzyn-Koźle
- 2012/2013 Polish Championship, with ZAKSA Kędzierzyn-Koźle
- 2013/2014 Polish Cup, with ZAKSA Kędzierzyn-Koźle
- 2015/2016 Polish Championship, with Asseco Resovia Rzeszów
- 2016/2017 Polish Cup, with ZAKSA Kędzierzyn-Koźle
- 2016/2017 Polish Championship, with ZAKSA Kędzierzyn-Koźle
