= 2016–17 PlusLiga =

- League: PlusLiga
- Sport: Volleyball
- Duration: 30 September 2016 – 23 April 2017
- Number of games: 260
- Number of teams: 16
- TV partner(s): Polsat Sport
- League champions: ZAKSA Kędzierzyn-Koźle (7th title)

Seasons
- ← 2015–16 2017–18 →

The 2016–17 PlusLiga was the 81st season of the Polish Volleyball Championship, the 17th season as a professional league organized by the Professional Volleyball League SA (Polish: Profesjonalna Liga Piłki Siatkowej SA) under the supervision of the Polish Volleyball Federation (Polish: Polski Związek Piłki Siatkowej).

The number of teams competing this season was increased to 16.

ZAKSA Kędzierzyn-Koźle won their 7th title of the Polish Champions.

== Regular season ==
Ranking system:

1. Points
2. Number of victories
3. Set ratio
4. Setpoint ratio
5. H2H results

Result	Winners	Losers
3–0	3 points	0 points
3–1	3 points	0 points
3–2	2 points	1 point

Pos	Team	Pld	W	L	Pts	SW	SL	SR	SPW	SPL	SPR	Qualification
1	ZAKSA Kędzierzyn-Koźle	30	26	4	77	83	24	3.458	2581	2176	1.186	Semifinals
2	Asseco Resovia	30	25	5	72	81	31	2.613	2610	2275	1.147	Semifinals
3	PGE Skra Bełchatów	30	25	5	69	80	32	2.500	2567	2304	1.114	Semifinals
4	Jastrzębski Węgiel	30	23	7	67	81	43	1.884	2839	2589	1.097	Semifinals
5	Indykpol AZS Olsztyn	30	22	8	65	76	41	1.854	2687	2476	1.085	
6	Cuprum Lubin	30	18	12	54	66	49	1.347	2630	2419	1.087	
7	Lotos Trefl Gdańsk	30	16	14	47	62	60	1.033	2720	2698	1.008	
8	Cerrad Czarni Radom	30	14	16	44	59	58	1.017	2625	2645	0.992	
9	Onico AZS Politechnika Warszawska	30	14	16	40	51	60	0.850	2492	2578	0.967	
10	GKS Katowice	30	13	17	39	53	66	0.803	2617	2678	0.977	
11	MKS Będzin	29	11	18	37	50	65	0.769	2566	2644	0.970	
12	Espadon Szczecin	30	9	21	27	41	74	0.554	2430	2620	0.927	
13	Effector Kielce	30	9	21	27	40	74	0.541	2381	2637	0.903	
14	BBTS Bielsko-Biała	30	6	24	22	32	78	0.410	2222	2601	0.854	
15	Łuczniczka Bydgoszcz	30	5	25	20	38	79	0.481	2423	2682	0.903	
16	AZS Częstochowa	30	4	26	13	27	84	0.321	2277	2645	0.861	

Source: PlusLiga

=== 1st round ===
Date	Time		Score		Set 1	Set 2	Set 3	Set 4	Set 5	Total	Report
1 Oct	15:00	Onico AZS Politechnika Warszawska	0–3	Asseco Resovia	15–25	22–25	23–25			60–75	
30 Sep	20:15	Espadon Szczecin	0–3	ZAKSA Kędzierzyn-Koźle	15–25	11–25	22–25			48–75	
5 Oct	18:00	PGE Skra Bełchatów	3–0	MKS Będzin	25–18	25–18	26–24			76–60	
3 Oct	18:00	Lotos Trefl Gdańsk	3–1	Effector Kielce	20–25	25–22	25–21	25–23		95–91	
19 Oct	18:00	BBTS Bielsko-Biała	0–3	Cuprum Lubin	17–25	16–25	20–25			53–75	
4 Oct	18:00	Cerrad Czarni Radom	3–0	AZS Częstochowa	27–25	25–21	25–17			77–63	
1 Oct	18:00	Jastrzębski Węgiel	3–2	Indykpol AZS Olsztyn	25–19	23–25	22–25	29–27	15–7	114–103	
2 Oct	18:00	GKS Katowice	3–1	Łuczniczka Bydgoszcz	25–19	14–25	25–18	25–19		89–81	

=== 2nd round ===
Date	Time		Score		Set 1	Set 2	Set 3	Set 4	Set 5	Total	Report
8 Oct	14:45	Onico AZS Politechnika Warszawska	3–0	Łuczniczka Bydgoszcz	25–18	25–20	25–20			75–58	
8 Oct	17:00	Indykpol AZS Olsztyn	3–0	GKS Katowice	25–18	25–21	25–12			75–51	
7 Oct	17:30	AZS Częstochowa	0–3	Jastrzębski Węgiel	16–25	22–25	16–25			54–75	
10 Oct	17:30	Cerrad Czarni Radom	1–3	BBTS Bielsko-Biała	20–25	23–25	27–25	21–25		91–100	
2 Nov	18:00	Effector Kielce	2–3	Cuprum Lubin	18–25	23–25	25–22	25–18	9–15	100–105	
9 Oct	18:00	MKS Będzin	2–3	Lotos Trefl Gdańsk	22–25	25–17	20–25	25–20	13–15	105–102	
9 Oct	14:45	ZAKSA Kędzierzyn-Koźle	1–3	PGE Skra Bełchatów	25–22	26–28	24–26	23–25		98–101	
6 Oct	18:00	Espadon Szczecin	0–3	Asseco Resovia	21–25	20–25	22–25			63–75	

=== 3rd round ===
Date	Time		Score		Set 1	Set 2	Set 3	Set 4	Set 5	Total	Report
14 Oct	18:00	Espadon Szczecin	0–3	Onico AZS Politechnika Warszawska	21–25	23–25	20–25			64–75	
15 Oct	14:45	PGE Skra Bełchatów	1–3	Asseco Resovia	23–25	18–25	25–19	20–25		86–94	
16 Oct	14:45	Lotos Trefl Gdańsk	1–3	ZAKSA Kędzierzyn-Koźle	18–25	25–21	24–26	23–25		90–97	
15 Oct	20:00	Cuprum Lubin	3–0	MKS Będzin	25–16	25–13	25–19			75–48	
14 Oct	18:00	Cerrad Czarni Radom	2–3	Effector Kielce	23–25	25–20	25–17	21–25	13–15	107–102	
15 Oct	17:30	Jastrzębski Węgiel	3–0	BBTS Bielsko-Biała	25–13	25–14	25–16			75–43	
15 Oct	17:00	GKS Katowice	3–0	AZS Częstochowa	25–16	25–23	26–24			76–63	
14 Oct	20:15	Łuczniczka Bydgoszcz	1–3	Indykpol AZS Olsztyn	18–25	16–25	25–19	14–25		73–94	

=== 4th round ===
Date	Time		Score		Set 1	Set 2	Set 3	Set 4	Set 5	Total	Report
22 Oct	15:00	Onico AZS Politechnika Warszawska	3–1	Indykpol AZS Olsztyn	25–23	25–20	18–25	28–26		96–94	
23 Oct	17:00	AZS Częstochowa	3–2	Łuczniczka Bydgoszcz	20–25	27–25	21–25	25–17	15–11	108–103	
22 Oct	14:00	BBTS Bielsko-Biała	0–3	GKS Katowice	24–26	22–25	15–25			61–76	
21 Oct	18:00	Effector Kielce	2–3	Jastrzębski Węgiel	25–22	25–22	14–25	15–25	13–15	92–109	
22 Dec	19:00	MKS Będzin	0–3	Cerrad Czarni Radom	18–25	20–25	22–25			60–75	
22 Oct	14:45	ZAKSA Kędzierzyn-Koźle	3–0	Cuprum Lubin	25–21	25–19	25–16			75–56	
21 Oct	20:15	Asseco Resovia	3–1	Lotos Trefl Gdańsk	25–18	25–17	17–25	25–17		92–77	
20 Oct	19:00	Espadon Szczecin	3–0	PGE Skra Bełchatów	25–0	25–0	25–0			75–0	

=== 5th round ===
Date	Time		Score		Set 1	Set 2	Set 3	Set 4	Set 5	Total	Report
26 Oct	18:00	PGE Skra Bełchatów	3–0	Onico AZS Politechnika Warszawska	25–20	30–28	25–22			80–70	
26 Oct	19:00	Lotos Trefl Gdańsk	3–1	Espadon Szczecin	25–15	26–28	27–25	25–19		103–87	
26 Oct	18:00	Cuprum Lubin	3–0	Asseco Resovia	25–20	25–20	25–22			75–62	
26 Oct	20:30	Cerrad Czarni Radom	1–3	ZAKSA Kędzierzyn-Koźle	22–25	20–25	25–23	19–25		86–98	
26 Oct	18:00	Jastrzębski Węgiel	1–3	MKS Będzin	21–25	31–29	22–25	21–25		95–104	
26 Oct	18:00	GKS Katowice	0–3	Effector Kielce	23–25	28–30	19–25			70–80	
26 Oct	18:00	Łuczniczka Bydgoszcz	3–0	BBTS Bielsko-Biała	25–23	25–19	25–17			75–59	
26 Oct	18:00	Indykpol AZS Olsztyn	3–1	AZS Częstochowa	25–22	27–25	18–25	25–19		95–91	

=== 6th round ===
Date	Time		Score		Set 1	Set 2	Set 3	Set 4	Set 5	Total	Report
31 Oct	18:00	Onico AZS Politechnika Warszawska	1–3	AZS Częstochowa	25–22	29–31	22–25	21–25		97–103	
29 Oct	17:00	BBTS Bielsko-Biała	0–3	Indykpol AZS Olsztyn	22–25	23–25	16–25			61–75	
29 Oct	17:00	Effector Kielce	3–2	Łuczniczka Bydgoszcz	15–25	25–23	22–25	25–18	15–11	102–102	
29 Oct	18:00	MKS Będzin	3–1	GKS Katowice	25–22	22–25	25–21	25–17		97–85	
29 Oct	20:00	ZAKSA Kędzierzyn-Koźle	3–2	Jastrzębski Węgiel	25–21	20–25	25–16	25–27	22–20	117–109	
30 Oct	14:45	Asseco Resovia	3–0	Cerrad Czarni Radom	25–18	25–16	25–15			75–49	
29 Oct	17:00	Cuprum Lubin	3–0	Espadon Szczecin	25–14	25–23	25–14			75–51	
29 Oct	14:45	PGE Skra Bełchatów	3–0	Lotos Trefl Gdańsk	25–18	30–28	25–16			80–62	

=== 7th round ===
Date	Time		Score		Set 1	Set 2	Set 3	Set 4	Set 5	Total	Report
5 Nov	17:00	Lotos Trefl Gdańsk	3–1	Onico AZS Politechnika Warszawska	25–20	23–25	25–16	25–20		98–81	
5 Nov	14:45	Cuprum Lubin	0–3	PGE Skra Bełchatów	23–25	19–25	19–25			61–75	
5 Nov	17:00	Cerrad Czarni Radom	3–1	Espadon Szczecin	25–20	25–20	27–29	25–19		102–88	
4 Nov	20:15	Jastrzębski Węgiel	3–1	Asseco Resovia	25–17	25–21	23–25	25–20		98–83	
5 Nov	20:00	GKS Katowice	0–3	ZAKSA Kędzierzyn-Koźle	26–28	16–25	20–25			62–78	
5 Nov	17:00	Łuczniczka Bydgoszcz	3–0	MKS Będzin	25–23	25–18	25–19			75–60	
7 Nov	18:00	Indykpol AZS Olsztyn	3–0	Effector Kielce	25–20	25–23	25–20			75–63	
5 Nov	17:00	AZS Częstochowa	3–2	BBTS Bielsko-Biała	16–25	25–22	25–23	22–25	15–4	103–99	

=== 8th round ===
Date	Time		Score		Set 1	Set 2	Set 3	Set 4	Set 5	Total	Report
21 Dec	19:30	Onico AZS Politechnika Warszawska	1–3	BBTS Bielsko-Biała	23–25	25–20	21–25	23–25		92–95	
12 Nov	17:00	Effector Kielce	3–1	AZS Częstochowa	25–22	25–21	19–25	25–21		94–89	
12 Nov	20:00	MKS Będzin	2–3	Indykpol AZS Olsztyn	25–20	22–25	13–25	25–22	6–15	91–107	
12 Nov	17:00	ZAKSA Kędzierzyn-Koźle	3–1	Łuczniczka Bydgoszcz	26–24	25–18	19–25	25–15		95–82	
12 Nov	17:00	Asseco Resovia	2–3	GKS Katowice	25–17	23–25	23–25	25–22	11–15	107–104	
14 Nov	19:00	Espadon Szczecin	1–3	Jastrzębski Węgiel	23–25	25–23	17–25	15–25		80–98	
12 Nov	14:45	PGE Skra Bełchatów	3–0	Cerrad Czarni Radom	25–12	25–23	25–18			75–53	
11 Nov	14:45	Lotos Trefl Gdańsk	3–2	Cuprum Lubin	25–16	18–25	17–25	25–22	15–13	100–101	

=== 9th round ===
Date	Time		Score		Set 1	Set 2	Set 3	Set 4	Set 5	Total	Report
19 Nov	18:00	Cuprum Lubin	3–1	Onico AZS Politechnika Warszawska	21–25	25–19	25–19	25–15		96–78	
19 Nov	14:45	Cerrad Czarni Radom	3–1	Lotos Trefl Gdańsk	21–25	25–22	30–28	32–30		108–105	
9 Nov	18:00	Jastrzębski Węgiel	3–2	PGE Skra Bełchatów	22–25	25–22	25–21	23–25	15–11	110–104	
19 Nov	17:00	GKS Katowice	3–1	Espadon Szczecin	25–19	21–25	35–33	25–16		106–93	
19 Nov	17:00	Łuczniczka Bydgoszcz	0–3	Asseco Resovia	21–25	18–25	20–25			59–75	
18 Nov	20:15	Indykpol AZS Olsztyn	0–3	ZAKSA Kędzierzyn-Koźle	19–25	16–25	21–25			56–75	
19 Nov	17:00	AZS Częstochowa	2–3	MKS Będzin	25–19	18–25	32–34	25–18	10–15	110–111	
17 Nov	18:00	BBTS Bielsko-Biała	2–3	Effector Kielce	21–25	25–23	25–21	22–25	12–15	105–109	

=== 10th round ===
Date	Time		Score		Set 1	Set 2	Set 3	Set 4	Set 5	Total	Report
25 Nov	18:00	Effector Kielce	1–3	Onico AZS Politechnika Warszawska	17–25	28–30	25–22	23–25		93–102	
26 Nov	17:00	ZAKSA Kędzierzyn-Koźle	3–0	AZS Częstochowa	25–11	25–21	25–19			75–51	
26 Nov	18:00	MKS Będzin	3–0	BBTS Bielsko-Biała	25–12	25–19	25–13			75–44	
26 Nov	20:00	Asseco Resovia	3–1	Indykpol AZS Olsztyn	25–19	22–25	25–22	25–21		97–87	
27 Nov	20:00	Espadon Szczecin	3–2	Łuczniczka Bydgoszcz	20–25	25–21	16–25	25–14	15–12	101–97	
25 Nov	20:15	PGE Skra Bełchatów	3–0	GKS Katowice	25–19	25–17	25–22			75–58	
26 Nov	14:45	Jastrzębski Węgiel	3–2	Lotos Trefl Gdańsk	25–21	25–20	23–25	22–25	15–13	110–104	
24 Nov	18:00	Cuprum Lubin	1–3	Cerrad Czarni Radom	26–28	25–23	29–31	23–25		103–107	

=== 11th round ===
Date	Time		Score		Set 1	Set 2	Set 3	Set 4	Set 5	Total	Report
29 Nov	18:00	Cerrad Czarni Radom	3–1	Onico AZS Politechnika Warszawska	25–23	22–25	25–17	25–22		97–87	
30 Nov	18:00	Jastrzębski Węgiel	2–3	Cuprum Lubin	24–26	26–24	25–12	16–25	11–15	102–102	
30 Nov	20:00	Lotos Trefl Gdańsk	0–3	GKS Katowice	18–25	22–25	20–25			60–75	
30 Nov	18:00	Łuczniczka Bydgoszcz	0–3	PGE Skra Bełchatów	23–25	19–25	23–25			65–75	
30 Nov	18:00	Indykpol AZS Olsztyn	3–1	Espadon Szczecin	23–25	28–26	28–26	25–13		104–90	
30 Nov	20:30	AZS Częstochowa	0–3	Asseco Resovia	23–25	18–25	21–25			62–75	
30 Nov	18:00	BBTS Bielsko-Biała	0–3	ZAKSA Kędzierzyn-Koźle	15–25	17–25	15–25			47–75	
30 Nov	17:00	Effector Kielce	2–3	MKS Będzin	17–25	17–25	27–25	25–21	10–15	96–111	

=== 12th round ===
Date	Time		Score		Set 1	Set 2	Set 3	Set 4	Set 5	Total	Report
3 Dec	20:00	Onico AZS Politechnika Warszawska	3–2	MKS Będzin	36–38	23–25	25–18	25–18	15–6	124–105	
3 Dec	16:30	ZAKSA Kędzierzyn-Koźle	3–0	Effector Kielce	28–26	25–18	25–21			78–65	
3 Dec	17:00	Asseco Resovia	3–2	BBTS Bielsko-Biała	28–30	25–16	21–25	25–18	15–7	114–96	
5 Dec	18:00	Espadon Szczecin	3–2	AZS Częstochowa	21–25	25–20	25–23	19–25	15–10	105–103	
3 Dec	14:45	PGE Skra Bełchatów	3–1	Indykpol AZS Olsztyn	25–27	25–22	25–13	25–21		100–83	
4 Dec	16:00	Lotos Trefl Gdańsk	3–1	Łuczniczka Bydgoszcz	36–38	25–18	25–14	25–18		111–88	
6 Dec	18:00	Cuprum Lubin	3–2	GKS Katowice	33–35	25–18	25–20	21–25	15–10	119–108	
2 Dec	20:15	Cerrad Czarni Radom	1–3	Jastrzębski Węgiel	23–25	28–26	16–25	23–25		90–101	

=== 13th round ===
Date	Time		Score		Set 1	Set 2	Set 3	Set 4	Set 5	Total	Report
10 Dec	14:45	Jastrzębski Węgiel	3–2	Onico AZS Politechnika Warszawska	28–30	20–25	25–18	25–20	15–12	113–105	
10 Dec	17:00	GKS Katowice	0–3	Cerrad Czarni Radom	23–25	19–25	27–29			69–79	
9 Dec	18:00	Łuczniczka Bydgoszcz	1–3	Cuprum Lubin	27–25	23–25	20–25	20–25		90–100	
9 Dec	20:15	Indykpol AZS Olsztyn	3–2	Lotos Trefl Gdańsk	25–21	25–14	21–25	13–25	16–14	100–99	
10 Dec	20:00	AZS Częstochowa	1–3	PGE Skra Bełchatów	30–28	15–25	22–25	21–25		88–103	
10 Dec	17:00	BBTS Bielsko-Biała	3–1	Espadon Szczecin	25–21	25–21	19–25	26–24		95–91	
10 Dec	17:00	Effector Kielce	0–3	Asseco Resovia	21–25	29–31	12–25			62–81	
9 Dec	18:00	MKS Będzin	0–3	ZAKSA Kędzierzyn-Koźle	16–25	16–25	18–25			50–75	

=== 14th round ===
Date	Time		Score		Set 1	Set 2	Set 3	Set 4	Set 5	Total	Report
14 Dec	20:30	Onico AZS Politechnika Warszawska	0–3	ZAKSA Kędzierzyn-Koźle	13–25	21–25	21–25			55–75	
14 Dec	18:00	Asseco Resovia	3–0	MKS Będzin	25–20	25–17	25–18			75–55	
13 Dec	18:00	Espadon Szczecin	3–0	Effector Kielce	25–23	31–29	25–21			81–73	
14 Dec	18:00	PGE Skra Bełchatów	3–0	BBTS Bielsko-Biała	25–17	25–14	25–21			75–52	
14 Dec	18:30	Lotos Trefl Gdańsk	3–1	AZS Częstochowa	22–25	25–15	25–18	25–19		97–77	
14 Dec	18:00	Cuprum Lubin	1–3	Indykpol AZS Olsztyn	19–25	22–25	25–21	23–25		89–96	
14 Dec	18:00	Łuczniczka Bydgoszcz	2–3	Cerrad Czarni Radom	25–18	30–32	25–14	17–25	11–15	108–104	
14 Dec	18:00	Jastrzębski Węgiel	3–1	GKS Katowice	25–15	24–26	25–19	25–16		99–76	

=== 15th round ===
Date	Time		Score		Set 1	Set 2	Set 3	Set 4	Set 5	Total	Report
17 Dec	17:00	GKS Katowice	2–3	Onico AZS Politechnika Warszawska	28–30	25–16	25–18	21–25	12–15	111–104	
16 Dec	20:15	Łuczniczka Bydgoszcz	0–3	Jastrzębski Węgiel	18–25	18–25	20–25			56–75	
18 Dec	15:00	Indykpol AZS Olsztyn	3–1	Cerrad Czarni Radom	22–25	25–15	25–20	25–15		97–75	
17 Dec	17:00	AZS Częstochowa	1–3	Cuprum Lubin	22–25	22–25	28–26	22–25		94–101	
17 Dec	17:00	Lotos Trefl Gdańsk	3–1	BBTS Bielsko-Biała	22–25	25–21	25–19	25–14		97–79	
17 Dec	18:00	Effector Kielce	0–3	PGE Skra Bełchatów	20–25	20–25	17–25			57–75	
19 Dec	18:00	MKS Będzin	3–0	Espadon Szczecin	25–19	25–16	25–21			75–56	
17 Dec	14:45	ZAKSA Kędzierzyn-Koźle	2–3	Asseco Resovia	23–25	25–18	25–18	18–25	13–15	104–101	

=== 16th round ===
Date	Time		Score		Set 1	Set 2	Set 3	Set 4	Set 5	Total	Report
30 Dec	20:15	Asseco Resovia	3–0	Onico AZS Politechnika Warszawska	25–19	25–18	25–17			75–54	
30 Dec	18:00	ZAKSA Kędzierzyn-Koźle	3–0	Espadon Szczecin	25–18	25–12	25–22			75–52	
30 Dec	19:00	MKS Będzin	2–3	PGE Skra Bełchatów	18–25	28–26	25–22	23–25	10–15	104–113	
21 Dec	18:00	Effector Kielce	0–3	Lotos Trefl Gdańsk	15–25	22–25	22–25			59–75	
30 Dec	18:00	Cuprum Lubin	3–0	BBTS Bielsko-Biała	25–22	25–18	25–17			75–57	
30 Dec	18:00	AZS Częstochowa	0–3	Cerrad Czarni Radom	13–25	21–25	15–25			49–75	
22 Dec	20:30	Indykpol AZS Olsztyn	3–1	Jastrzębski Węgiel	24–26	25–18	25–23	27–25		101–92	
30 Dec	18:00	Łuczniczka Bydgoszcz	2–3	GKS Katowice	25–22	17–25	25–21	23–25	15–17	105–110	

=== 17th round ===
Date	Time		Score		Set 1	Set 2	Set 3	Set 4	Set 5	Total	Report
6 Jan	20:15	Łuczniczka Bydgoszcz	0–3	Onico AZS Politechnika Warszawska	17–25	20–25	26–28			63–78	
8 Jan	14:45	GKS Katowice	0–3	Indykpol AZS Olsztyn	14–25	20–25	15–25			49–75	
7 Jan	15:00	Jastrzębski Węgiel	3–0	AZS Częstochowa	25–18	25–16	25–16			75–50	
7 Jan	15:00	BBTS Bielsko-Biała	3–1	Cerrad Czarni Radom	25–20	20–25	25–23	25–20		95–88	
7 Jan	17:00	Cuprum Lubin	3–0	Effector Kielce	25–20	25–16	25–17			75–53	
8 Jan	16:00	Lotos Trefl Gdańsk	3–0	MKS Będzin	25–21	25–19	27–25			77–65	
7 Jan	14:45	PGE Skra Bełchatów	3–2	ZAKSA Kędzierzyn-Koźle	23–25	19–25	25–18	25–20	15–9	107–97	
7 Jan	17:00	Asseco Resovia	3–0	Espadon Szczecin	25–23	25–18	25–17			75–58	

=== 18th round ===
Date	Time		Score		Set 1	Set 2	Set 3	Set 4	Set 5	Total	Report
28 Jan	18:00	Onico AZS Politechnika Warszawska	3–0	Espadon Szczecin	25–19	25–17	25–20			75–56	
28 Jan	14:45	Asseco Resovia	3–1	PGE Skra Bełchatów	20–25	25–22	30–28	25–17		100–92	
28 Jan	20:00	ZAKSA Kędzierzyn-Koźle	3–0	Lotos Trefl Gdańsk	25–22	25–15	25–16			75–53	
27 Jan	18:00	MKS Będzin	3–2	Cuprum Lubin	25–23	20–25	25–23	23–25	15–11	108–107	
28 Jan	17:00	Effector Kielce	0–3	Cerrad Czarni Radom	22–25	17–25	19–25			58–75	
30 Jan	18:00	BBTS Bielsko-Biała	1–3	Jastrzębski Węgiel	25–22	17–25	19–25	20–25		81–97	
28 Jan	17:00	AZS Częstochowa	2–3	GKS Katowice	14–25	25–21	22–25	25–22	10–15	96–108	
27 Jan	18:00	Indykpol AZS Olsztyn	3–1	Łuczniczka Bydgoszcz	25–22	25–21	20–25	25–20		95–88	

=== 19th round ===
Date	Time		Score		Set 1	Set 2	Set 3	Set 4	Set 5	Total	Report
21 Jan	17:00	Indykpol AZS Olsztyn	3–0	Onico AZS Politechnika Warszawska	25–18	30–28	25–20			80–66	
21 Jan	17:00	Łuczniczka Bydgoszcz	3–0	AZS Częstochowa	25–18	25–23	27–25			77–66	
23 Jan	18:00	GKS Katowice	3–0	BBTS Bielsko-Biała	25–22	25–21	25–13			75–56	
21 Jan	14:45	Jastrzębski Węgiel	3–0	Effector Kielce	25–21	25–17	25–23			75–61	
20 Jan	18:00	Cerrad Czarni Radom	3–1	MKS Będzin	25–22	25–18	22–25	25–23		97–88	
24 Jan	18:00	Cuprum Lubin	1–3	ZAKSA Kędzierzyn-Koźle	17–25	25–19	23–25	19–25		84–94	
22 Jan	14:45	Lotos Trefl Gdańsk	3–2	Asseco Resovia	23–25	26–24	17–25	25–20	15–10	106–104	
22 Jan	18:00	PGE Skra Bełchatów	3–0	Espadon Szczecin	25–23	25–21	25–23			75–67	

=== 20th round ===
Date	Time		Score		Set 1	Set 2	Set 3	Set 4	Set 5	Total	Report
4 Feb	14:45	Onico AZS Politechnika Warszawska	3–1	PGE Skra Bełchatów	25–22	22–25	25–23	25–18		97–88	
6 Feb	18:00	Espadon Szczecin	3–1	Lotos Trefl Gdańsk	22–25	25–22	31–29	25–23		103–99	
5 Feb	18:00	Asseco Resovia	3–2	Cuprum Lubin	26–24	25–16	15–25	21–25	17–15	104–105	
4 Feb	17:00	ZAKSA Kędzierzyn-Koźle	3–2	Cerrad Czarni Radom	21–25	26–24	17–25	25–19	19–17	108–110	
3 Feb	19:00	MKS Będzin	1–3	Jastrzębski Węgiel	25–21	22–25	26–28	20–25		93–99	
4 Feb	17:00	Effector Kielce	1–3	GKS Katowice	25–22	13–25	19–25	23–25		80–97	
3 Feb	18:00	BBTS Bielsko-Biała	2–3	Łuczniczka Bydgoszcz	29–31	25–16	25–22	17–25	11–15	107–109	
4 Feb	17:00	AZS Częstochowa	0–3	Indykpol AZS Olsztyn	18–25	23–25	22–25			63–75	

=== 21st round ===
Date	Time		Score		Set 1	Set 2	Set 3	Set 4	Set 5	Total	Report
13 Feb	18:00	AZS Częstochowa	1–3	Onico AZS Politechnika Warszawska	25–16	18–25	28–30	22–25		93–96	
11 Feb	17:00	Indykpol AZS Olsztyn	3–0	BBTS Bielsko-Biała	25–17	25–18	25–22			75–57	
10 Feb	18:00	Łuczniczka Bydgoszcz	2–3	Effector Kielce	23–25	25–17	25–22	20–25	15–17	108–106	
11 Feb	17:00	GKS Katowice	0–3	MKS Będzin	20–25	22–25	23–25			65–75	
10 Feb	18:00	Jastrzębski Węgiel	2–3	ZAKSA Kędzierzyn-Koźle	25–23	25–23	19–25	18–25	11–15	98–111	
10 Feb	18:00	Cerrad Czarni Radom	1–3	Asseco Resovia	25–19	18–25	21–25	14–25		78–94	
12 Feb	14:45	Espadon Szczecin	0–3	Cuprum Lubin	19–25	16–25	15–25			50–75	
11 Feb	14:45	Lotos Trefl Gdańsk	2–3	PGE Skra Bełchatów	25–21	20–25	25–16	18–25	10–15	98–102	

=== 22nd round ===
Date	Time		Score		Set 1	Set 2	Set 3	Set 4	Set 5	Total	Report
19 Feb	14:45	Onico AZS Politechnika Warszawska	1–3	Lotos Trefl Gdańsk	25–27	23–25	25–21	18–25		91–98	
18 Feb	14:45	PGE Skra Bełchatów	3–0	Cuprum Lubin	25–20	25–16	25–23			75–59	
17 Feb	18:00	Espadon Szczecin	2–3	Cerrad Czarni Radom	12–25	20–25	25–22	25–23	9–15	91–110	
18 Feb	20:00	Asseco Resovia	1–3	Jastrzębski Węgiel	21–25	25–15	24–26	20–25		90–91	
18 Feb	17:00	ZAKSA Kędzierzyn-Koźle	3–0	GKS Katowice	30–28	32–30	31–29			93–87	
17 Feb	18:00	MKS Będzin	2–3	Łuczniczka Bydgoszcz	25–17	19–25	22–25	25–14	13–15	104–96	
18 Feb	17:00	Effector Kielce	0–3	Indykpol AZS Olsztyn	23–25	19–25	19–25			61–75	
18 Feb	18:00	BBTS Bielsko-Biała	1–3	AZS Częstochowa	23–25	25–19	18–25	22–25		88–94	

=== 23rd round ===
Date	Time		Score		Set 1	Set 2	Set 3	Set 4	Set 5	Total	Report
22 Feb	18:00	BBTS Bielsko-Biała	3–0	Onico AZS Politechnika Warszawska	25–21	31–29	25–22			81–72	
22 Feb	18:30	AZS Częstochowa	1–3	Effector Kielce	20–25	20–25	25–17	25–27		90–94	
22 Feb	18:00	Indykpol AZS Olsztyn	3–2	MKS Będzin	24–26	19–25	25–13	25–13	15–9	108–86	
22 Feb	18:00	Łuczniczka Bydgoszcz	0–3	ZAKSA Kędzierzyn-Koźle	23–25	16–25	22–25			61–75	
22 Feb	20:30	GKS Katowice	2–3	Asseco Resovia	26–28	25–20	25–22	23–25	12–15	111–110	
22 Feb	18:00	Jastrzębski Węgiel	3–0	Espadon Szczecin	25–15	25–20	25–23			75–58	
21 Feb	20:30	Cerrad Czarni Radom	2–3	PGE Skra Bełchatów	25–16	19–25	25–22	17–25	10–15	96–103	
22 Feb	18:00	Cuprum Lubin	3–1	Lotos Trefl Gdańsk	25–16	24–26	25–15	25–16		99–73	

=== 24th round ===
Date	Time		Score		Set 1	Set 2	Set 3	Set 4	Set 5	Total	Report
18 Jan	19:00	Onico AZS Politechnika Warszawska	0–3	Cuprum Lubin	15–25	21–25	19–25			55–75	
26 Feb	14:30	Lotos Trefl Gdańsk	3–1	Cerrad Czarni Radom	22–25	25–18	25–23	25–20		97–86	
26 Feb	14:45	PGE Skra Bełchatów	3–2	Jastrzębski Węgiel	25–27	25–17	23–25	25–15	15–10	113–94	
26 Feb	17:00	Espadon Szczecin	2–3	GKS Katowice	16–25	28–26	25–22	20–25	11–15	100–113	
25 Feb	20:00	Asseco Resovia	3–0	Łuczniczka Bydgoszcz	25–17	25–21	25–13			75–51	
25 Feb	14:45	ZAKSA Kędzierzyn-Koźle	3–1	Indykpol AZS Olsztyn	21–25	25–21	25–21	25–22		96–89	
24 Feb	18:00	MKS Będzin	3–1	AZS Częstochowa	27–29	25–19	25–14	25–10		102–72	
25 Feb	18:00	Effector Kielce	3–0	BBTS Bielsko-Biała	25–21	25–13	25–13			75–47	

=== 25th round ===
Date	Time		Score		Set 1	Set 2	Set 3	Set 4	Set 5	Total	Report
2 Mar	19:00	Onico AZS Politechnika Warszawska	1–3	Effector Kielce	23–25	25–18	18–25	20–25		86–93	
6 Mar	18:00	AZS Częstochowa	0–3	ZAKSA Kędzierzyn-Koźle	15–25	16–25	20–25			51–75	
4 Mar	17:00	BBTS Bielsko-Biała	1–3	MKS Będzin	25–20	17–25	14–25	26–28		82–98	
4 Mar	14:45	Indykpol AZS Olsztyn	2–3	Asseco Resovia	25–19	25–23	17–25	21–25	10–15	98–107	
3 Mar	18:00	Łuczniczka Bydgoszcz	1–3	Espadon Szczecin	21–25	25–20	23–25	22–25		91–95	
4 Mar	20:00	GKS Katowice	2–3	PGE Skra Bełchatów	22–25	25–21	20–25	25–22	13–15	105–108	
5 Mar	15:00	Lotos Trefl Gdańsk	1–3	Jastrzębski Węgiel	20–25	25–14	18–25	26–28		89–92	
4 Mar	17:00	Cerrad Czarni Radom	3–0	Cuprum Lubin	27–25	26–24	25–21			78–70	

=== 26th round ===
Date	Time		Score		Set 1	Set 2	Set 3	Set 4	Set 5	Total	Report
7 Mar	19:00	Onico AZS Politechnika Warszawska	3–1	Cerrad Czarni Radom	25–20	25–20	21–25	25–18		96–83	
8 Mar	18:00	Cuprum Lubin	2–3	Jastrzębski Węgiel	25–17	25–22	22–25	21–25	11–15	104–104	
17 Jan	18:00	GKS Katowice	3–2	Lotos Trefl Gdańsk	25–22	25–14	20–25	16–25	15–13	101–99	
8 Mar	17:00	PGE Skra Bełchatów	3–0	Łuczniczka Bydgoszcz	25–14	25–14	25–9			75–37	
8 Mar	18:00	Espadon Szczecin	2–3	Indykpol AZS Olsztyn	25–20	25–27	25–17	16–25	11–15	102–104	
8 Mar	18:00	Asseco Resovia	3–0	AZS Częstochowa	25–21	25–20	25–15			75–56	
8 Mar	18:00	ZAKSA Kędzierzyn-Koźle	3–0	BBTS Bielsko-Biała	25–22	25–9	25–20			75–51	
8 Mar	20:30	MKS Będzin	3–1	Effector Kielce	25–22	25–13	19–25	25–20		94–80	

=== 27th round ===
Date	Time		Score		Set 1	Set 2	Set 3	Set 4	Set 5	Total	Report
11 Mar	18:00	MKS Będzin	1–3	Onico AZS Politechnika Warszawska	23–25	21–25	25–18	21–25		90–93	
12 Mar	17:00	Effector Kielce	0–3	ZAKSA Kędzierzyn-Koźle	19–25	19–25	15–25			53–75	
11 Mar	15:00	BBTS Bielsko-Biała	0–3	Asseco Resovia	16–25	19–25	19–25			54–75	
11 Mar	17:00	AZS Częstochowa	1–3	Espadon Szczecin	15–25	25–21	14–25	21–25		75–96	
11 Mar	14:45	Indykpol AZS Olsztyn	2–3	PGE Skra Bełchatów	27–29	15–25	25–22	25–19	9–15	101–110	
11 Mar	17:00	Łuczniczka Bydgoszcz	2–3	Lotos Trefl Gdańsk	25–23	22–25	25–19	18–25	13–15	103–107	
11 Mar	17:00	GKS Katowice	2–3	Cuprum Lubin	25–23	13–25	18–25	29–27	12–15	97–115	
13 Mar	18:00	Jastrzębski Węgiel	3–0	Cerrad Czarni Radom	25–23	25–20	25–19			75–62	

=== 28th round ===
Date	Time		Score		Set 1	Set 2	Set 3	Set 4	Set 5	Total	Report
18 Mar	14:45	Onico AZS Politechnika Warszawska	3–2	Jastrzębski Węgiel	25–23	20–25	19–25	25–21	15–12	104–106	
17 Mar	18:00	Cerrad Czarni Radom	2–3	GKS Katowice	24–26	14–25	25–18	25–23	22–24	110–116	
18 Mar	17:00	Cuprum Lubin	3–1	Łuczniczka Bydgoszcz	26–24	17–25	25–21	25–19		93–89	
18 Mar	20:00	Lotos Trefl Gdańsk	0–3	Indykpol AZS Olsztyn	26–28	25–27	18–25			69–80	
18 Mar	17:00	PGE Skra Bełchatów	3–0	AZS Częstochowa	25–19	25–18	25–19			75–56	
17 Mar	18:00	Espadon Szczecin	2–3	BBTS Bielsko-Biała	23–25	23–25	25–16	25–23	18–20	114–109	
18 Mar	17:00	Asseco Resovia	3–1	Effector Kielce	25–17	25–14	20–25	25–15		95–71	
19 Mar	17:00	ZAKSA Kędzierzyn-Koźle	3–1	MKS Będzin	28–30	25–18	25–23	27–25		105–96	

=== 29th round ===
Date	Time		Score		Set 1	Set 2	Set 3	Set 4	Set 5	Total	Report
26 Mar	18:00	ZAKSA Kędzierzyn-Koźle	3–0	Onico AZS Politechnika Warszawska	25–22	25–16	25–12			75–50	
26 Mar	17:00	MKS Będzin	0–3	Asseco Resovia	17–25	16–25	18–25			51–75	
25 Mar	20:00	Effector Kielce	2–3	Espadon Szczecin	25–20	25–27	22–25	25–23	11–15	108–110	
25 Mar	15:00	BBTS Bielsko-Biała	0–3	PGE Skra Bełchatów	19–25	24–26	14–25			57–76	
24 Mar	20:30	AZS Częstochowa	0–3	Lotos Trefl Gdańsk	17–25	24–26	15–25			56–76	
25 Mar	14:45	Indykpol AZS Olsztyn	3–1	Cuprum Lubin	17–25	25–17	25–21	25–23		92–86	
25 Mar	17:00	Cerrad Czarni Radom	3–1	Łuczniczka Bydgoszcz	25–11	25–18	23–25	25–22		98–76	
28 Mar	18:00	GKS Katowice	2–3	Jastrzębski Węgiel	20–25	23–25	25–22	25–21	9–15	102–108	

=== 30th round ===
Date	Time		Score		Set 1	Set 2	Set 3	Set 4	Set 5	Total	Report
1 Apr	14:45	Onico AZS Politechnika Warszawska	3–0	GKS Katowice	25–19	25–20	28–26			78–65	
1 Apr	14:45	Jastrzębski Węgiel	3–0	Łuczniczka Bydgoszcz	25–17	25–21	25–19			75–57	
31 Mar	18:00	Cerrad Czarni Radom	1–3	Indykpol AZS Olsztyn	25–23	15–25	19–25	19–25		78–98	
1 Apr	17:00	Cuprum Lubin	3–0	AZS Częstochowa	25–23	25–8	25–20			75–51	
1 Apr	15:00	BBTS Bielsko-Biała	2–3	Lotos Trefl Gdańsk	21–25	23–25	25–20	25–16	17–19	111–105	
2 Apr	17:30	PGE Skra Bełchatów	3–0	Effector Kielce	25–14	25–19	25–17			75–50	
2 Apr	16:30	Espadon Szczecin	3–2	MKS Będzin	25–23	19–25	21–25	25–21	15–11	105–105	
1 Apr	20:00	Asseco Resovia	3–0	ZAKSA Kędzierzyn-Koźle	25–21	25–22	25–19			75–62	

== Playoffs ==
Semifinals
1	ZAKSA Kędzierzyn-Koźle	2
4	Jastrzębski Węgiel	0
3	PGE Skra Bełchatów	2
2	Asseco Resovia	0

Finals
1	ZAKSA Kędzierzyn-Koźle	2
3	PGE Skra Bełchatów	0

=== Semifinals ===
- (to 2 victories)

==== Semifinal A ====
Date	Time		Score		Set 1	Set 2	Set 3	Set 4	Set 5	Total	Report
7 Apr	17:30	Jastrzębski Węgiel	0–3	ZAKSA Kędzierzyn-Koźle	23–25	20–25	19–25			62–75	
12 Apr	18:00	ZAKSA Kędzierzyn-Koźle	3–0	Jastrzębski Węgiel	25–19	25–17	25–20			75–56	

==== Semifinal B ====
Date	Time		Score		Set 1	Set 2	Set 3	Set 4	Set 5	Total	Report
9 Apr	17:30	PGE Skra Bełchatów	3–0	Asseco Resovia	25–21	25–15	25–13			75–49	
12 Apr	20:30	Asseco Resovia	2–3	PGE Skra Bełchatów	25–21	19–25	25–21	18–25	8–15	95–107	

=== Finals ===
- (to 2 victories)

Date	Time		Score		Set 1	Set 2	Set 3	Set 4	Set 5	Total	Report
19 Apr	18:00	PGE Skra Bełchatów	0–3	ZAKSA Kędzierzyn-Koźle	25–27	21–25	19–25			65–77	
23 Apr	20:30	ZAKSA Kędzierzyn-Koźle	3–1	PGE Skra Bełchatów	21–25	25–23	27–25	25–18		98–91	

== Placement matches ==
- (to 2 victories)

=== 15th place ===
Date	Time		Score		Set 1	Set 2	Set 3	Set 4	Set 5	Total	Report
12 Apr	18:00	AZS Częstochowa	3–2	Łuczniczka Bydgoszcz	25–19	25–23	19–25	16–25	15–7	100–99	
19 Apr	18:00	Łuczniczka Bydgoszcz	3–1	AZS Częstochowa	23–25	25–21	25–19	25–18		98–83	

=== 13th place ===
Date	Time		Score		Set 1	Set 2	Set 3	Set 4	Set 5	Total	Report
11 Apr	18:00	BBTS Bielsko-Biała	2–3	Effector Kielce	25–19	23–25	25–21	22–25	12–15	107–105	
13 Apr	18:00	Effector Kielce	3–0	BBTS Bielsko-Biała	25–19	25–17	25–19			75–55	

=== 11th place ===
Date	Time		Score		Set 1	Set 2	Set 3	Set 4	Set 5	Total	Report
4 Apr	19:00	Espadon Szczecin	1–3	MKS Będzin	22–25	21–25	37–35	23–25		103–110	
12 Apr	19:00	MKS Będzin	3–0	Espadon Szczecin	25–23	26–24	25–15			76–62	

=== 9th place ===
Date	Time		Score		Set 1	Set 2	Set 3	Set 4	Set 5	Total	Report
8 Apr	14:45	Onico AZS Politechnika Warszawska	3–1	GKS Katowice	25–18	25–17	17–25	25–19		92–79	
9 Apr	17:00	GKS Katowice	3–1	Onico AZS Politechnika Warszawska	25–18	29–31	31–29	25–21		110–99	
Golden set		GKS Katowice	12–15	Onico AZS Politechnika Warszawska							

=== 7th place ===
Date	Time		Score		Set 1	Set 2	Set 3	Set 4	Set 5	Total	Report
8 Apr	17:00	Cerrad Czarni Radom	2–3	Lotos Trefl Gdańsk	22–25	25–15	25–23	16–25	13–15	101–103	
13 Apr	18:00	Lotos Trefl Gdańsk	1–3	Cerrad Czarni Radom	19–25	30–28	18–25	18–25		85–103	

=== 5th place ===
Date	Time		Score		Set 1	Set 2	Set 3	Set 4	Set 5	Total	Report
7 Apr	18:00	Cuprum Lubin	1–3	Indykpol AZS Olsztyn	25–16	24–26	16–25	21–25		86–92	
12 Apr	18:00	Indykpol AZS Olsztyn	3–1	Cuprum Lubin	25–27	25–23	25–15	25–22		100–87	

=== 3rd place ===
Date	Time		Score		Set 1	Set 2	Set 3	Set 4	Set 5	Total	Report
18 Apr	18:00	Jastrzębski Węgiel	3–1	Asseco Resovia	25–21	34–32	24–26	25–21		108–100	
23 Apr	17:30	Asseco Resovia	2–3	Jastrzębski Węgiel	26–24	25–17	21–25	26–28	9–15	107–109	

== Final standings ==
Qualified for the 2017–18 CEV Champions League
Qualified for the 2017–18 CEV Cup
Playoffs with the top team from the 1st league

Rank	Team
1st place, gold medalist(s)	ZAKSA Kędzierzyn-Koźle
2nd place, silver medalist(s)	PGE Skra Bełchatów
3rd place, bronze medalist(s)	Jastrzębski Węgiel
4	Asseco Resovia
5	Indykpol AZS Olsztyn
6	Cuprum Lubin
7	Cerrad Czarni Radom
8	Lotos Trefl Gdańsk
9	Onico AZS Politechnika Warszawska
10	GKS Katowice
11	MKS Będzin
12	Espadon Szczecin
13	Effector Kielce
14	BBTS Bielsko-Biała
15	Łuczniczka Bydgoszcz
16	AZS Częstochowa

2017 Polish champions
ZAKSA Kędzierzyn-Koźle
7th title

== Squads ==
Asseco Resovia
No.	Name	Date of birth	Height	Position
1	(Poland) Piotr Nowakowski	18 December 1987	2.05 m (6 ft 9 in)	middle blocker
2	(United States) Thomas Jaeschke	4 September 1993	2.00 m (6 ft 7 in)	outside hitter
3	(Poland) Bartłomiej Lemański	19 March 1996	2.16 m (7 ft 1 in)	middle blocker
4	(Canada) John Gordon Perrin	17 August 1989	2.01 m (6 ft 7 in)	outside hitter
5	(Czech Republic) Lukáš Ticháček	12 January 1982	1.93 m (6 ft 4 in)	setter
6	(Poland) Dawid Dryja	21 July 1992	2.01 m (6 ft 7 in)	middle blocker
8	(Serbia) Marko Ivović	22 December 1990	1.94 m (6 ft 4 in)	outside hitter
9	(France) Thibault Rossard	28 August 1993	1.93 m (6 ft 4 in)	opposite
10	(Germany) Jochen Schöps	8 October 1983	2.00 m (6 ft 7 in)	opposite
11	(Poland) Fabian Drzyzga	3 January 1990	1.96 m (6 ft 5 in)	setter
12	(Canada) Gavin Schmitt	27 January 1986	2.09 m (6 ft 10 in)	opposite
13	(Poland) Mateusz Masłowski	13 June 1997	1.85 m (6 ft 1 in)	libero
14	(Poland) Dominik Depowski	27 October 1995	2.00 m (6 ft 7 in)	outside hitter
17	(Poland) Marcin Możdżonek	9 February 1985	2.11 m (6 ft 11 in)	middle blocker
18	(Poland) Damian Wojtaszek	7 September 1988	1.80 m (5 ft 11 in)	libero
20	(Canada) Frederic Winters	25 September 1982	1.95 m (6 ft 5 in)	outside hitter
Head coach:		(Poland) Andrzej Kowal		

AZS Częstochowa
No.	Name	Date of birth	Height	Position
1	(Poland) Tomasz Kowalski	12 June 1991	2.02 m (6 ft 8 in)	setter
2	(Poland) Łukasz Polański	29 January 1989	2.05 m (6 ft 9 in)	middle blocker
3	(Poland) Stanisław Wawrzyńczyk	4 January 1990	2.00 m (6 ft 7 in)	outside hitter
5	(Ukraine) Mykola Moroz	10 December 1992	1.95 m (6 ft 5 in)	outside hitter
6	(Poland) Adam Kowalski	16 September 1994	1.80 m (5 ft 11 in)	libero
7	(Poland) Michał Szalacha	15 January 1994	2.02 m (6 ft 8 in)	middle blocker
9	(Poland) Paweł Adamajtis	30 August 1990	1.99 m (6 ft 6 in)	opposite
10	(Poland) Bartosz Buniak	8 October 1985	0 m (0 in)	middle blocker
12	(Poland) Kamil Ociepka	26 August 1997	1.75 m (5 ft 9 in)	libero
13	(Poland) Rafał Szymura	29 August 1995	1.97 m (6 ft 6 in)	outside hitter
14	(Ukraine) Oleksandr Grebeniuk	19 January 1989	2.02 m (6 ft 8 in)	opposite
15	(Poland) Bartłomiej Janus	19 January 1995	0 m (0 in)	middle blocker
16	(Poland) Adrian Szlubowski	14 July 1987	1.99 m (6 ft 6 in)	opposite
17	(Poland) Konrad Buczek	17 February 1994	1.90 m (6 ft 3 in)	setter
Head coach:		(Poland) Michał Bąkiewicz		

BBTS Bielsko-Biała
No.	Name	Date of birth	Height	Position
1	(Poland) Mariusz Gaca	20 January 1984	2.00 m (6 ft 7 in)	middle blocker
2	(Poland) Bartłomiej Grzechnik	8 February 1993	2.00 m (6 ft 7 in)	middle blocker
3	(Ukraine) Dmytro Storozhylov	1 June 1986	1.97 m (6 ft 6 in)	setter
4	(Poland) Wojciech Siek	10 May 1994	2.05 m (6 ft 9 in)	middle blocker
5	(Poland) Krzysztof Modzelewski	5 February 1992	1.96 m (6 ft 5 in)	outside hitter
6	(Poland) Paweł Gryc	9 January 1996	2.08 m (6 ft 10 in)	opposite
7	(Poland) Przemysław Czauderna	21 May 1992	1.83 m (6 ft 0 in)	libero
8	(Poland) Bartosz Janeczek	12 July 1987	1.98 m (6 ft 6 in)	opposite
9	(Poland) Krzysztof Bieńkowski	19 June 1995	1.98 m (6 ft 6 in)	setter
10	(Poland) Łukasz Koziura	8 June 1992	1.80 m (5 ft 11 in)	libero
11	(Serbia) Miloš Vemić	8 March 1987	2.02 m (6 ft 8 in)	outside hitter
14	(Czech Republic) Adam Bartoš	27 April 1992	1.99 m (6 ft 6 in)	outside hitter
19	(Poland) Bartłomiej Lipiński	16 November 1996	2.01 m (6 ft 7 in)	outside hitter
20	(Poland) Kamil Kwasowski	13 September 1990	1.97 m (6 ft 6 in)	outside hitter
Head coach:		(Slovakia) Miroslav Palgut → (Slovakia) Rastislav Chudík		

Cerrad Czarni Radom
No.	Name	Date of birth	Height	Position
1	(Poland) Bartłomiej Bołądź	28 September 1994	2.04 m (6 ft 8 in)	opposite
2	(Poland) Michał Ostrowski	29 March 1990	2.03 m (6 ft 8 in)	middle blocker
3	(Poland) Łukasz Wiese	24 March 1993	1.95 m (6 ft 5 in)	outside hitter
5	(Poland) Jakub Urbanowicz	14 August 1993	2.03 m (6 ft 8 in)	outside hitter
6	(Poland) Wojciech Żaliński	8 January 1988	1.96 m (6 ft 5 in)	outside hitter
7	(Poland) Michał Kędzierski	9 August 1994	1.94 m (6 ft 4 in)	setter
8	(Poland) Jakub Zwiech	6 November 1996	2.04 m (6 ft 8 in)	middle blocker
9	(Poland) Jakub Ziobrowski	23 January 1997	2.02 m (6 ft 8 in)	opposite
10	(United States) Dustin Watten	27 October 1986	1.83 m (6 ft 0 in)	libero
11	(Poland) Piotr Filipowicz	29 August 1995	1.90 m (6 ft 3 in)	libero
12	(Slovakia) Emanuel Kohút	21 July 1982	2.04 m (6 ft 8 in)	middle blocker
15	(United States) David Smith	15 May 1985	2.01 m (6 ft 7 in)	middle blocker
17	(Poland) Tomasz Fornal	31 August 1997	2.00 m (6 ft 7 in)	outside hitter
18	(Poland) Kacper Gonciarz	31 August 1992	1.92 m (6 ft 4 in)	setter
Head coach:		(Poland) Robert Prygiel		

Cuprum Lubin
No.	Name	Date of birth	Height	Position
1	(Poland) Mateusz Malinowski	6 May 1992	1.98 m (6 ft 6 in)	opposite
2	(Poland) Łukasz Kaczmarek	29 June 1994	2.04 m (6 ft 8 in)	opposite
3	(Estonia) Keith Pupart	19 March 1985	1.95 m (6 ft 5 in)	outside hitter
5	(Poland) Adam Michalski	24 December 1988	2.01 m (6 ft 7 in)	middle blocker
6	(Poland) Paweł Rusek	21 January 1983	1.83 m (6 ft 0 in)	libero
7	(Poland) Maciej Gorzkiewicz	16 February 1984	1.92 m (6 ft 4 in)	setter
8	(Germany) Marcus Böhme	25 August 1985	2.11 m (6 ft 11 in)	middle blocker
9	(Estonia) Robert Täht	15 August 1993	1.92 m (6 ft 4 in)	outside hitter
10	(Poland) Dawid Gunia	1 January 1987	2.03 m (6 ft 8 in)	middle blocker
11	(Poland) Marcin Kryś	15 January 1983	1.92 m (6 ft 4 in)	libero
13	(Greece) Rafail Koumentakis	5 May 1993	2.03 m (6 ft 8 in)	outside hitter
15	(Belgium) Igor Grobelny	8 June 1993	1.94 m (6 ft 4 in)	outside hitter
16	(Poland) Piotr Hain	26 February 1991	2.07 m (6 ft 9 in)	middle blocker
18	(Poland) Grzegorz Łomacz	1 October 1987	1.88 m (6 ft 2 in)	setter
Head coach:		(Romania) Gheorghe Crețu		

Effector Kielce
No.	Name	Date of birth	Height	Position
1	(Poland) Szymon Biniek	30 July 1995	1.88 m (6 ft 2 in)	libero
2	(Poland) Bartosz Bućko	6 January 1995	1.95 m (6 ft 5 in)	outside hitter
3	(Poland) Krzysztof Antosik	15 November 1987	1.96 m (6 ft 5 in)	setter
4	(Poland) Marcin Komenda	24 May 1996	1.98 m (6 ft 6 in)	setter
5	(Poland) Patryk Więckowski	27 March 1998	2.02 m (6 ft 8 in)	opposite
6	(Austria) Peter Wohlfahrtstätter	10 March 1989	2.03 m (6 ft 8 in)	middle blocker
7	(Poland) Jakub Wachnik	16 February 1993	2.02 m (6 ft 8 in)	outside hitter
8	(Ukraine) Andriy Orobko	10 August 1997	2.01 m (6 ft 7 in)	middle blocker
9	(Russia) Alexey Nalobin	3 October 1989	2.05 m (6 ft 9 in)	middle blocker
10	(Poland) Maciej Pawliński	2 February 1983	1.93 m (6 ft 4 in)	outside hitter
11	(Poland) Michał Superlak	16 November 1993	2.06 m (6 ft 9 in)	opposite
12	(Poland) Konrad Formela	8 March 1995	1.94 m (6 ft 4 in)	outside hitter
14	(Poland) Jacek Ziemnicki	30 May 1997	1.89 m (6 ft 2 in)	outside hitter
15	(Poland) Wojciech Dyk	21 May 1998	2.02 m (6 ft 8 in)	middle blocker
16	(Croatia) Leo Andrić	20 July 1994	2.03 m (6 ft 8 in)	opposite
17	(Poland) Jędrzej Maćkowiak	17 October 1992	2.00 m (6 ft 7 in)	middle blocker
18	(Poland) Damian Sobczak	13 December 1991	1.84 m (6 ft 0 in)	libero
Head coach:		(Poland) Dariusz Daszkiewicz → (Turkey) Sinan Cem Tanık		

Espadon Szczecin
No.	Name	Date of birth	Height	Position
1	(Poland) Janusz Gałązka	26 April 1987	1.99 m (6 ft 6 in)	middle blocker
2	(Poland) Bartłomiej Kluth	20 December 1992	2.10 m (6 ft 11 in)	opposite
3	(Serbia) Ivan Borovnjak	4 July 1988	2.02 m (6 ft 8 in)	outside hitter
4	(Bulgaria) Georgi Bratoev	21 October 1987	2.03 m (6 ft 8 in)	setter
4	(Poland) Dominik Depowski	27 October 1995	2.00 m (6 ft 7 in)	outside hitter
6	(Poland) Maciej Wołosz	29 January 1982	1.98 m (6 ft 6 in)	outside hitter
7	(Poland) Łukasz Perłowski	3 April 1984	2.04 m (6 ft 8 in)	middle blocker
8	(Poland) Maciej Zajder	31 January 1988	2.02 m (6 ft 8 in)	middle blocker
9	(Bulgaria) Danail Milušev	2 March 1984	2.00 m (6 ft 7 in)	opposite
10	(Poland) Dawid Murek	24 July 1977	1.95 m (6 ft 5 in)	libero
11	(Poland) Michał Ruciak	22 August 1983	1.90 m (6 ft 3 in)	outside hitter
12	(Slovakia) Michal Sládeček	12 February 1980	1.80 m (5 ft 11 in)	setter
13	(Poland) Marcin Wika	9 November 1983	1.94 m (6 ft 4 in)	outside hitter
14	(Poland) Maciej Kowalonek	29 March 1993	1.88 m (6 ft 2 in)	outside hitter
15	(Serbia) Veljko Petković	23 January 1977	1.99 m (6 ft 6 in)	setter
16	(Poland) Bartosz Cedzyński	20 December 1990	2.11 m (6 ft 11 in)	middle blocker
17	(Poland) Michał Kozłowski	16 February 1985	1.91 m (6 ft 3 in)	setter
18	(Poland) Adrian Mihułka	10 July 1989	1.82 m (6 ft 0 in)	libero
Head coach:		(Serbia) Milan Simojlović → (Poland) Michał Mieszko Gogol		

GKS Katowice
No.	Name	Date of birth	Height	Position
1	(Poland) Bartłomiej Krulicki	15 September 1993	2.05 m (6 ft 9 in)	middle blocker
2	(Poland) Karol Butryn	18 June 1993	1.94 m (6 ft 4 in)	opposite
5	(Italy) Marco Falaschi	18 September 1987	1.87 m (6 ft 2 in)	setter
6	(Poland) Michał Błoński	24 March 1987	1.87 m (6 ft 2 in)	outside hitter
7	(Ukraine) Serhiy Kapelus	22 October 1982	1.91 m (6 ft 3 in)	outside hitter
8	(Poland) Tomasz Kalembka	30 June 1991	2.05 m (6 ft 9 in)	middle blocker
9	(Poland) Paweł Pietraszko	5 October 1990	2.03 m (6 ft 8 in)	middle blocker
10	(Poland) Maciej Fijałek	7 August 1982	1.86 m (6 ft 1 in)	setter
12	(Belgium) Gert Van Walle	7 August 1987	1.98 m (6 ft 6 in)	opposite
14	(Poland) Bartosz Mariański	26 May 1992	1.87 m (6 ft 2 in)	libero
15	(Poland) Kacper Stelmach	5 May 1997	2.03 m (6 ft 8 in)	outside hitter
16	(Poland) Rafał Sobański	10 August 1991	1.95 m (6 ft 5 in)	outside hitter
17	(Poland) Adrian Stańczak	17 February 1987	1.85 m (6 ft 1 in)	libero
Head coach:		(Poland) Piotr Gruszka		

Indykpol AZS Olsztyn
No.	Name	Date of birth	Height	Position
2	(Czech Republic) Jan Hadrava	3 June 1991	1.98 m (6 ft 6 in)	opposite
3	(Poland) Michał Żurek	3 June 1988	1.81 m (5 ft 11 in)	libero
4	(Poland) Daniel Pliński	10 December 1978	2.04 m (6 ft 8 in)	middle blocker
5	(Poland) Miłosz Zniszczoł	2 July 1986	2.01 m (6 ft 7 in)	middle blocker
6	(Poland) Michał Tomczak	20 October 1995	1.92 m (6 ft 4 in)	setter
7	(Poland) Jakub Kochanowski	17 July 1997	1.99 m (6 ft 6 in)	middle blocker
8	(Netherlands) Hidde Boswinkel	30 March 1995	2.02 m (6 ft 8 in)	opposite
9	(Poland) Piotr Szostek	28 July 1997	1.93 m (6 ft 4 in)	opposite
10	(Poland) Łukasz Makowski	21 February 1989	1.87 m (6 ft 2 in)	setter
11	(Poland) Aleksander Śliwka	24 May 1995	1.98 m (6 ft 6 in)	outside hitter
12	(Poland) Paweł Woicki	19 June 1983	1.82 m (6 ft 0 in)	setter
13	(Poland) Adrian Buchowski	30 September 1991	1.94 m (6 ft 4 in)	outside hitter
14	(Argentina) Ezequiel Palacios	2 October 1992	2.00 m (6 ft 7 in)	outside hitter
17	(Poland) Jakub Zabłocki	10 April 1995	1.80 m (5 ft 11 in)	libero
18	(Poland) Leszek Wójcik	6 November 1996	1.95 m (6 ft 5 in)	outside hitter
19	(Poland) Marek Kurmin	22 June 1995	1.85 m (6 ft 1 in)	setter
20	(Poland) Wojciech Włodarczyk	28 October 1990	2.00 m (6 ft 7 in)	outside hitter
Head coach:		(Italy) Andrea Gardini		

Jastrzębski Węgiel
No.	Name	Date of birth	Height	Position
1	(Poland) Patryk Strzeżek	19 November 1989	2.03 m (6 ft 8 in)	opposite
2	(Poland) Maciej Muzaj	21 May 1994	2.08 m (6 ft 10 in)	opposite
3	(Poland) Jakub Popiwczak	17 April 1996	1.80 m (5 ft 11 in)	libero
4	(Poland) Grzegorz Kosok	2 March 1986	2.05 m (6 ft 9 in)	middle blocker
5	(Poland) Radosław Gil	25 January 1997	1.91 m (6 ft 3 in)	setter
6	(Poland) Damian Boruch	14 December 1989	2.09 m (6 ft 10 in)	middle blocker
7	(United States) Scott Touzinsky	22 April 1982	1.95 m (6 ft 5 in)	outside hitter
8	(Poland) Marcin Ernastowicz	31 July 1997	1.90 m (6 ft 3 in)	outside hitter
9	(Canada) Jason DeRocco	19 September 1989	2.01 m (6 ft 7 in)	outside hitter
10	(Germany) Lukas Kampa	29 November 1986	1.93 m (6 ft 4 in)	setter
11	(Poland) Wojciech Sobala	12 May 1988	2.07 m (6 ft 9 in)	middle blocker
12	(Poland) Karol Gdowski	10 February 1999	1.83 m (6 ft 0 in)	libero
13	(Cuba) Salvador Hidalgo Oliva	27 December 1985	1.95 m (6 ft 5 in)	outside hitter
16	(Germany) Sebastian Schwarz	2 October 1985	1.97 m (6 ft 6 in)	outside hitter
17	(Poland) Marcin Bachmatiuk	17 May 1992	2.05 m (6 ft 9 in)	middle blocker
Head coach:		(Australia) Mark Lebedew		

Lotos Trefl Gdańsk
No.	Name	Date of birth	Height	Position
1	(Poland) Patryk Niemiec	18 February 1997	2.02 m (6 ft 8 in)	middle blocker
2	(Poland) Wojciech Grzyb	4 January 1981	2.05 m (6 ft 9 in)	middle blocker
3	(Poland) Piotr Gacek	16 September 1978	1.85 m (6 ft 1 in)	libero
4	(Poland) Przemysław Stępień	7 February 1994	1.85 m (6 ft 1 in)	setter
5	(Poland) Bartosz Pietruczuk	26 February 1993	1.96 m (6 ft 5 in)	outside hitter
6	(Poland) Szymon Jakubiszak	13 February 1998	2.08 m (6 ft 10 in)	outside hitter
7	(Poland) Damian Schulz	26 February 1990	2.08 m (6 ft 10 in)	opposite
8	(Poland) Maciej Ptaszyński	16 November 1998	1.95 m (6 ft 5 in)	outside hitter
9	(Ukraine) Dmytro Pashytskyy	29 November 1987	2.05 m (6 ft 9 in)	middle blocker
10	(Poland) Bartosz Gawryszewski	22 August 1985	2.02 m (6 ft 8 in)	middle blocker
11	(Poland) Wojciech Ferens	5 April 1991	1.94 m (6 ft 4 in)	outside hitter
13	(Poland) Szymon Romać	1 October 1992	1.96 m (6 ft 5 in)	opposite
15	(Poland) Mateusz Mika	21 January 1991	2.06 m (6 ft 9 in)	outside hitter
16	(Poland) Fabian Majcherski	28 March 1997	1.75 m (5 ft 9 in)	libero
17	(Poland) Miłosz Hebda	11 March 1991	2.06 m (6 ft 9 in)	outside hitter
20	(Slovakia) Michal Masný	14 August 1979	1.82 m (6 ft 0 in)	setter
Head coach:		(Italy) Andrea Anastasi		

Łuczniczka Bydgoszcz
No.	Name	Date of birth	Height	Position
1	(Poland) Jan Nowakowski	17 May 1994	2.02 m (6 ft 8 in)	middle blocker
2	(Poland) Jakub Rohnka	10 March 1992	1.95 m (6 ft 5 in)	outside hitter
3	(Serbia) Milan Katić	22 October 1993	2.01 m (6 ft 7 in)	outside hitter
4	(Poland) Wojciech Jurkiewicz	21 June 1977	2.05 m (6 ft 9 in)	middle blocker
5	(Poland) Wojciech Ferens	5 April 1991	1.94 m (6 ft 4 in)	outside hitter
6	(Australia) Igor Yudin	17 June 1987	1.98 m (6 ft 6 in)	opposite
8	(Poland) Mateusz Siwicki	23 July 1996	2.00 m (6 ft 7 in)	middle blocker
9	(Poland) Bartosz Filipiak	27 February 1994	1.97 m (6 ft 6 in)	opposite
11	(Poland) Patryk Szczurek	6 February 1991	0 m (0 in)	setter
13	(Poland) Piotr Sieńko	8 December 1993	1.96 m (6 ft 5 in)	setter
14	(Poland) Marcel Gromadowski	19 December 1985	2.03 m (6 ft 8 in)	opposite
15	(Poland) Kacper Bobrowski	8 October 1997	1.90 m (6 ft 3 in)	outside hitter
16	(Poland) Mateusz Czunkiewicz	16 December 1996	0 m (0 in)	libero
17	(Poland) Mateusz Sacharewicz	23 October 1989	1.98 m (6 ft 6 in)	middle blocker
19	(Poland) Patryk Mendel	27 March 1998	1.97 m (6 ft 6 in)	outside hitter
Head coach:		(Poland) Piotr Makowski → (Serbia) Dragan Mihailović		

MKS Będzin
No.	Name	Date of birth	Height	Position
1	(Poland) Marcin Waliński	24 October 1990	1.95 m (6 ft 5 in)	outside hitter
2	(Poland) Dawid Woch	16 May 1997	2.00 m (6 ft 7 in)	middle blocker
3	(Australia) Nathan Roberts	17 February 1986	1.97 m (6 ft 6 in)	outside hitter
4	(Poland) Łukasz Kozub	3 November 1997	1.86 m (6 ft 1 in)	setter
5	(Poland) Artur Ratajczak	18 September 1990	2.06 m (6 ft 9 in)	middle blocker
6	(Poland) Dawid Żłobecki	4 April 1997	1.96 m (6 ft 5 in)	outside hitter
7	(Poland) Mateusz Kowalski	20 February 1997	2.05 m (6 ft 9 in)	middle blocker
8	(United States) Jonah Seif	30 October 1994	2.05 m (6 ft 9 in)	setter
9	(Poland) Mateusz Przybyła	12 April 1991	2.08 m (6 ft 10 in)	middle blocker
10	(Poland) Paweł Stysiał	30 January 1997	1.85 m (6 ft 1 in)	libero
11	(Poland) Oskar Wojtaszkiewicz	20 May 1996	1.95 m (6 ft 5 in)	setter
12	(Poland) Mateusz Piotrowski	24 June 1991	0 m (0 in)	opposite
13	(Poland) Michał Potera	6 March 1988	1.83 m (6 ft 0 in)	libero
14	(Poland) Jakub Peszko	1 April 1992	1.93 m (6 ft 4 in)	outside hitter
15	(United States) Kyle Russell	25 August 1993	2.06 m (6 ft 9 in)	outside hitter
16	(Poland) Krzysztof Rejno	22 February 1993	2.03 m (6 ft 8 in)	middle blocker
17	(Bulgaria) Zlatan Yordanov	2 March 1991	1.98 m (6 ft 6 in)	outside hitter
20	(Brazil) Rafael Araújo	13 June 1991	2.07 m (6 ft 9 in)	opposite
Head coach:		(Canada) Stelio DeRocco		

Onico AZS Politechnika Warszawska
No.	Name	Date of birth	Height	Position
1	(Poland) Jakub Kowalczyk	26 June 1986	2.00 m (6 ft 7 in)	middle blocker
2	(Poland) Maciej Olenderek	16 October 1992	1.78 m (5 ft 10 in)	libero
3	(Poland) Przemysław Smoliński	27 November 1992	2.01 m (6 ft 7 in)	middle blocker
5	(Poland) Paweł Zagumny	18 October 1977	2.00 m (6 ft 7 in)	setter
6	(Poland) Paweł Halaba	14 December 1995	1.94 m (6 ft 4 in)	outside hitter
7	(Poland) Jędrzej Gruszczyński	13 November 1997	1.86 m (6 ft 1 in)	libero
8	(Poland) Andrzej Wrona	27 December 1988	2.06 m (6 ft 9 in)	middle blocker
9	(France) Guillaume Samica	28 September 1981	1.97 m (6 ft 6 in)	outside hitter
10	(Poland) Michał Filip	31 August 1994	1.97 m (6 ft 6 in)	opposite
11	(Poland) Łukasz Łapszyński	23 September 1993	1.94 m (6 ft 4 in)	outside hitter
12	(Poland) Waldemar Świrydowicz	18 December 1986	2.05 m (6 ft 9 in)	middle blocker
13	(Poland) Jan Firlej	26 September 1996	1.88 m (6 ft 2 in)	setter
18	(Poland) Bartosz Kwolek	17 July 1997	1.93 m (6 ft 4 in)	outside hitter
20	(Poland) Paweł Mikołajczak	20 June 1988	1.95 m (6 ft 5 in)	opposite
Head coach:		(Poland) Jakub Bednaruk		

PGE Skra Bełchatów
No.	Name	Date of birth	Height	Position
1	(Serbia) Srećko Lisinac	17 May 1992	2.05 m (6 ft 9 in)	middle blocker
2	(Poland) Mariusz Wlazły	4 August 1983	1.94 m (6 ft 4 in)	opposite
4	(Poland) Mariusz Marcyniak	5 March 1992	2.06 m (6 ft 9 in)	middle blocker
5	(Poland) Bartosz Kurek	29 August 1988	2.05 m (6 ft 9 in)	opposite
6	(Poland) Karol Kłos	8 August 1989	2.01 m (6 ft 7 in)	middle blocker
7	(Poland) Bartosz Bednorz	25 July 1994	2.01 m (6 ft 7 in)	outside hitter
8	(Poland) Yuriy Gladyr	8 July 1984	2.02 m (6 ft 8 in)	middle blocker
9	(Poland) Marcin Janusz	31 July 1994	1.95 m (6 ft 5 in)	setter
10	(Argentina) Nicolás Uriarte	21 March 1990	1.89 m (6 ft 2 in)	setter
12	(Poland) Artur Szalpuk	20 March 1995	2.01 m (6 ft 7 in)	outside hitter
13	(Poland) Michał Winiarski	28 September 1983	2.00 m (6 ft 7 in)	outside hitter
15	(Serbia) Dražen Luburić	2 November 1993	0 m (0 in)	opposite
16	(Poland) Kacper Piechocki	17 December 1995	1.85 m (6 ft 1 in)	libero
17	(Bulgaria) Nikolay Penchev	22 May 1992	1.96 m (6 ft 5 in)	outside hitter
18	(Poland) Robert Milczarek	28 November 1983	1.88 m (6 ft 2 in)	libero
Head coach:		(France) Philippe Blain		

ZAKSA Kędzierzyn-Koźle
No.	Name	Date of birth	Height	Position
1	(Poland) Paweł Zatorski	21 June 1990	1.84 m (6 ft 0 in)	libero
2	(France) Kévin Tillie	2 November 1990	2.00 m (6 ft 7 in)	outside hitter
3	(Poland) Dominik Witczak	2 January 1983	1.98 m (6 ft 6 in)	opposite
6	(Poland) Dawid Konarski	31 August 1989	1.98 m (6 ft 6 in)	opposite
7	(Poland) Rafał Buszek	28 April 1987	1.96 m (6 ft 5 in)	outside hitter
9	(Poland) Łukasz Wiśniewski	3 February 1989	1.98 m (6 ft 6 in)	middle blocker
10	(Poland) Mateusz Bieniek	5 April 1994	2.08 m (6 ft 10 in)	middle blocker
12	(Poland) Grzegorz Bociek	6 June 1991	2.07 m (6 ft 9 in)	opposite
13	(Poland) Kamil Semeniuk	16 July 1996	1.94 m (6 ft 4 in)	outside hitter
14	(Poland) Grzegorz Pająk	1 January 1987	1.96 m (6 ft 5 in)	setter
15	(Belgium) Sam Deroo	24 April 1992	2.03 m (6 ft 8 in)	outside hitter
16	(France) Benjamin Toniutti	30 October 1989	1.83 m (6 ft 0 in)	setter
18	(Poland) Korneliusz Banach	25 January 1994	1.84 m (6 ft 0 in)	libero
19	(Poland) Patryk Czarnowski	1 November 1985	2.04 m (6 ft 8 in)	middle blocker
Head coach:		(Italy) Ferdinando De Giorgi		

== See also ==
- 2016–17 CEV Champions League
