= Grzegorz Bociek =

Polish volleyball player (born 1991)

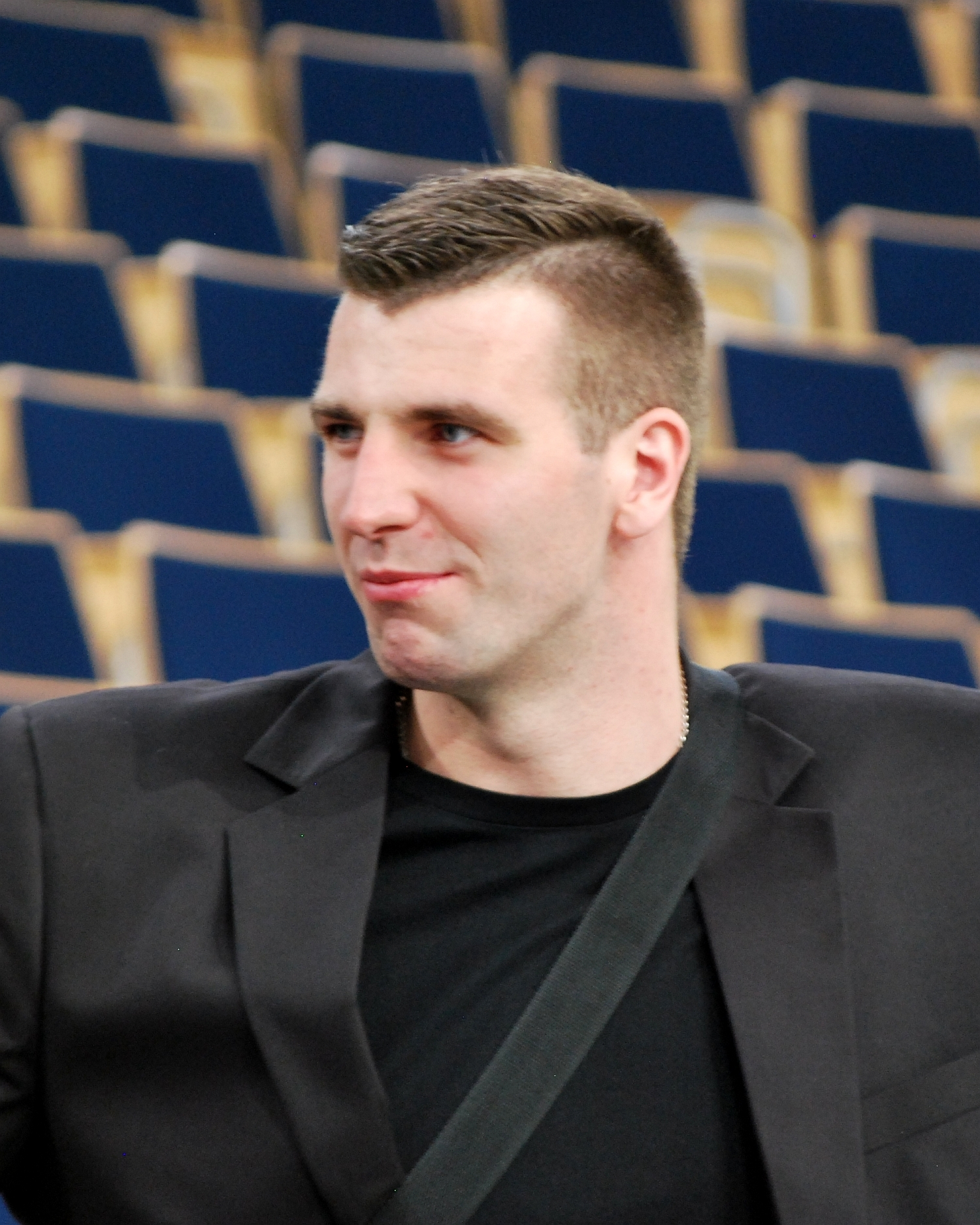

Personal information
- Nationality: (Poland) Polish
- Born: 6 June 1991 (age 35); Opoczno, Poland
- Height: 2.07 m (6 ft 9 in)
- Weight: 107 kg (236 lb)
- Spike: 367 cm (144 in)

Volleyball information
- Position: Opposite
- Current team: (Poland) Cuprum Lubin

Career
Years	Teams
2010–2012; 2012–2013; 2013–2017; 2017–2021; 2021; 2021–	(Poland) Skra Bełchatów (Poland) AZS Częstochowa (Poland) ZAKSA Kędzierzyn-Koźle (Poland) Warta Zawiercie (Poland) Gwardia Wrocław (Poland) Cuprum Lubin

National team
2013–	Poland

Grzegorz Bociek (born 6 June 1991) is a Polish volleyball player. At the professional club level, he plays for Cuprum Lubin, two–time Polish Champion (2016, 2017).

== Personal life ==
Bociek was born in Sielec, Poland. He has two brothers – Łukasz, Piotr and a younger sister Monika (born 1996), who is also a volleyball player and has played in the Polish women's junior national team. On June 12, 2014, his fiancée Paulina gave birth to their daughter Alicja. On October 1, 2014, Bociek announced at a press conference that he is suspending his sports career because of a serious disease. He was suffering from a tumor of the lymphoid tissues. On October 4, 2014, he married Paulina (née Bigos). Bociek disease began with lymphadenopathy in the neck. Upon further investigation, it turned out that it was a cancer of the lymphatic system. The whole volleyball environment helped him financially and supported him, including a few Polish clubs - ZAKSA Kędzierzyn-Koźle and PGE Skra. On April 2, 2015, he announced via Facebook that recent studies have shown that he is healthy and is going back to volleyball. He got the call to the Polish national team in 2015.

== Career ==
=== Clubs ===
Bociek moved to the club from Kędzierzyn-Koźle in June 2013. In the 2013/2014 season they won the Polish Cup. On October 1, 2014, Bociek suspended his sports career. In April 2014 came back to trainings and signed new contract with ZAKSA.

== Sporting achievements ==
=== Clubs ===
- National championships
  - 2013/2014 Polish Cup, with ZAKSA Kędzierzyn-Koźle
  - 2015/2016 Polish Championship, with ZAKSA Kędzierzyn-Koźle
  - 2016/2017 Polish Cup, with ZAKSA Kędzierzyn-Koźle
  - 2016/2017 Polish Championship, with ZAKSA Kędzierzyn-Koźle

=== Universiade ===
- 2013 Summer Universiade
