= Grzegorz Pająk =

Polish volleyball player

Personal information
- Born: 1 January 1987 (age 39); Stalowa Wola, Poland
- Height: 1.96 m (6 ft 5 in)
- Weight: 94 kg (207 lb)
- Spike: 349 cm (137 in)

Volleyball information
- Position: Setter
- Current club: GKS Katowice
- Number: 14

Career
Years	Teams
2006–2008; 2008–2009; 2009–2011; 2011–2012; 2012–2013; 2013–2014; 2014–2015; 2015–2017; 2017–2018; 2018–2019; 2019; 2019–2020; 2020–2022; 2022–2023; 2023; 2023–2025; 2025–	MKS Orzeł Międzyrzecz; BBTS Bielsko-Biała; Jastrzębski Węgiel; Martigues Volleyball; Effector Kielce; AZS Olsztyn; Effector Kielce; ZAKSA Kędzierzyn-Koźle; Warta Zawiercie; Tokat Belediye Plevne; Dynamo Moscow; MKS Będzin; LUK Lublin; Cuprum Lubin; AZS Olsztyn; MKS Będzin; GKS Katowice
Honours
Men's volleyball
Representing Poland
European League
Bronze medal – third place	2015 Poland

Grzegorz Pająk (born 1 January 1987) is a Polish professional volleyball player who plays as a setter for GKS Katowice.

== Honours ==
=== Club ===
- Domestic
  - 2009–10 Polish Cup, with Jastrzębski Węgiel
  - 2015–16 Polish Championship, with ZAKSA Kędzierzyn-Koźle
  - 2016–17 Polish Cup, with ZAKSA Kędzierzyn-Koźle
  - 2016–17 Polish Championship, with ZAKSA Kędzierzyn-Koźle
