= Adam Smolarczyk =

Polish volleyball player (born 1994)

Personal information
- Nationality: (Poland) Polish
- Born: 12 May 1994 (age 32); Tarnowskie Góry
- Height: 6 ft 8 in (2.04 m)
- Weight: 223 lb (101 kg)
- Spike: 140 in (356 cm)

Volleyball information
- Position: Outside hitter

Career
Years	Teams
2010–2013; 2010–2013; 2012–2015; 2015–2016; 2016–2018; 2018–2019; 2019–2020	(Poland) SMS PZPS Spała (Poland) Norwid Częstochowa (Poland) AZS AGH Kraków (Poland) MKS Aqua Zdrój Wałbrzych (Poland) Norwid Częstochowa (Poland) AZS AGH Kraków (Poland) ZAKSA Kędzierzyn-Koźle

Adam Smolarczyk (born 12 May 1994) is a Polish volleyball player.

== Sporting achievements ==
- National championships
  - 2019/2020 Polish SuperCup, with Grupa Azoty ZAKSA Kędzierzyn-Koźle
