= Grzegorz Pilarz =

Polish volleyball player (born 1980)

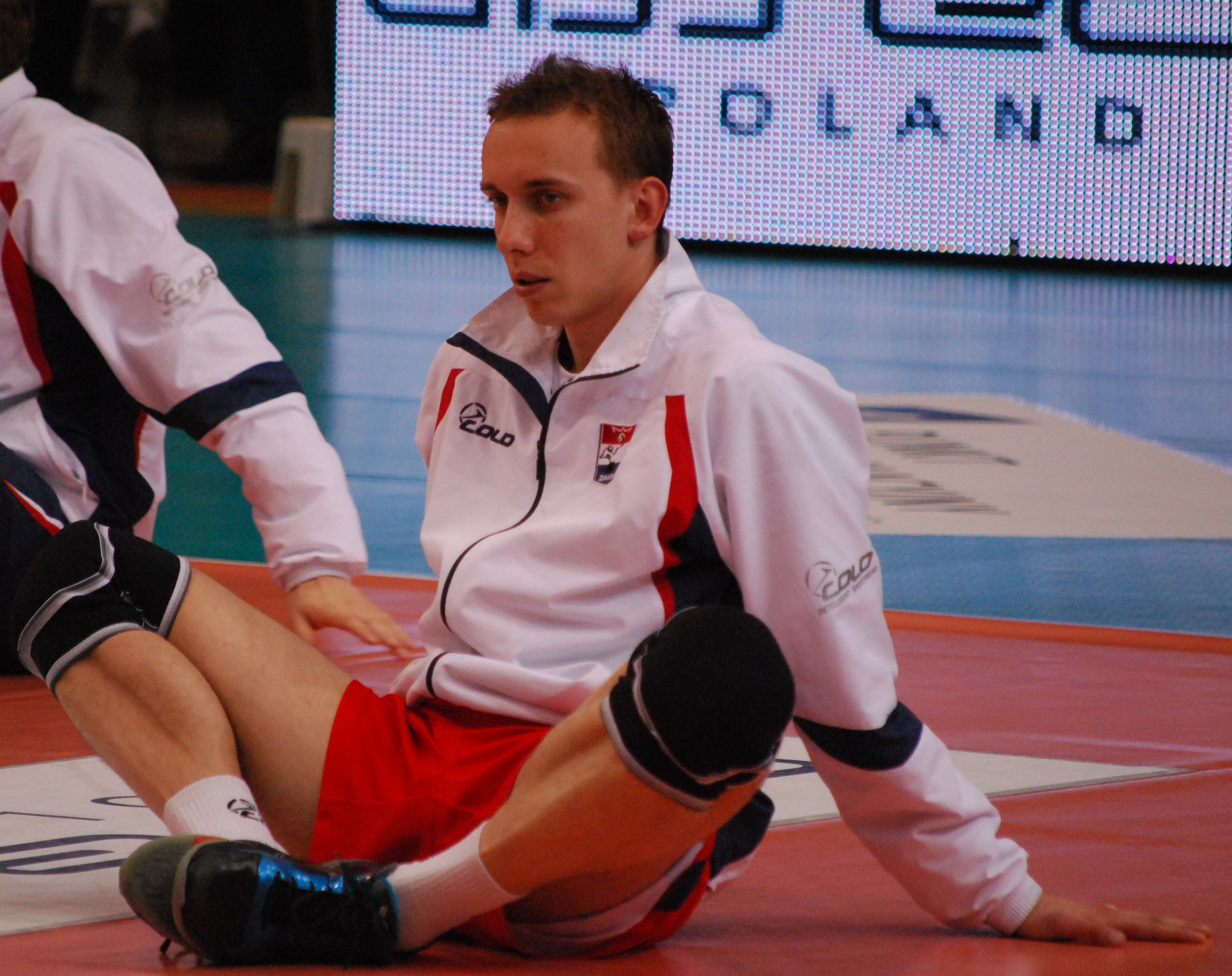

Personal information
- Full name: Grzegorz Pilarz
- Nationality: Polish
- Born: February 12, 1980 (age 46); Bielsko-Biała, Poland
- Height: 1.88 m (6 ft 2 in)
- Weight: 83 kg (183 lb)
- Spike: 330 cm (130 in)
- Block: 315 cm (124 in)

Volleyball information
- Position: Setter
- Current team: BBTS Bielsko-Biała
- Number: 7

Career
Years	Teams
2001–2003; 2003–2005; 2005–2007; 2007–2014; 2014–	Stolarka Wołomin; Jastrzębski Węgiel; Asseco Resovia Rzeszów; ZAKSA Kędzierzyn-Koźle; BBTS Bielsko-Biała

National team
Poland
- Last updated: 6 February 2017

Grzegorz Pilarz (born February 12, 1980) is a Polish volleyball player, Polish club BBTS Bielsko-Biała, Polish Champion (2004).

== Career ==
=== Clubs ===
In 2014 moved to BBTS Bielsko-Biała, where he is the captain of the team.

== Sporting achievements ==
=== CEV Cup ===
- 2010/2011 - with ZAKSA Kędzierzyn-Koźle

=== National championship ===
- 2003/2004 Polish Championship, with Jastrzębski Węgiel
- 2010/2011 Polish Championship, with ZAKSA Kędzierzyn-Koźle
- 2011/2012 Polish Championship, with ZAKSA Kędzierzyn-Koźle
- 2012/2013 Polish Cup, with ZAKSA Kędzierzyn-Koźle
- 2012/2013 Polish Championship, with ZAKSA Kędzierzyn-Koźle
- 2013/2014 Polish Cup, with ZAKSA Kędzierzyn-Koźle
