= Wojciech Ferens =

Polish volleyball player (born 1991)

Personal information
- Born: 5 April 1991 (age 35) Radom, Poland
- Height: 1.94 m (6 ft 4 in)
- Weight: 96 kg (212 lb)
- Spike: 358 cm (141 in)

Volleyball information
- Position: Outside hitter
- Current club: GKS Katowice
- Number: 5

Career
- Years: Team
- 2010–2013 2013–2014 2014–2015 2015–2016 2016–2018 2018–2019 2019 2019–2020 2020–2025 2025–2026 2026–: AZS Olsztyn; ZAKSA Kędzierzyn-Koźle; BBTS Bielsko-Biała; Transfer Bydgoszcz; Trefl Gdańsk; AS Cannes; Jastrzębski Węgiel; Warta Zawiercie; Cuprum Lubin; Al Ahli; GKS Katowice
Honours
Men's volleyball
Representing Poland
European League
Bronze medal – third place	2015 Poland

Wojciech Ferens (born 5 April 1991) is a Polish professional volleyball player who plays as an outside hitter for GKS Katowice.

== Career ==
=== National team ===
On 2 April 2015 was appointed to the Polish national team by head coach Stephane Antiga. After the training camp in Spała he went to team B of Polish national team led by Andrzej Kowal. He took part in 1st edition of 2015 European Games. On 14 August 2015 he achieved first medal as senior national team player – bronze of European League. His national team won 3rd place match with Estonia (3–0).

== Honours ==
=== Club ===
- Domestic
  - 2017–18 Polish Cup, with Trefl Gdańsk

=== Youth national team ===
- 2009 European Youth Olympic Festival

=== Universiade ===
- 2013 Summer Universiade
