= Rafał Szymura =

Polish volleyball player (born 1995)

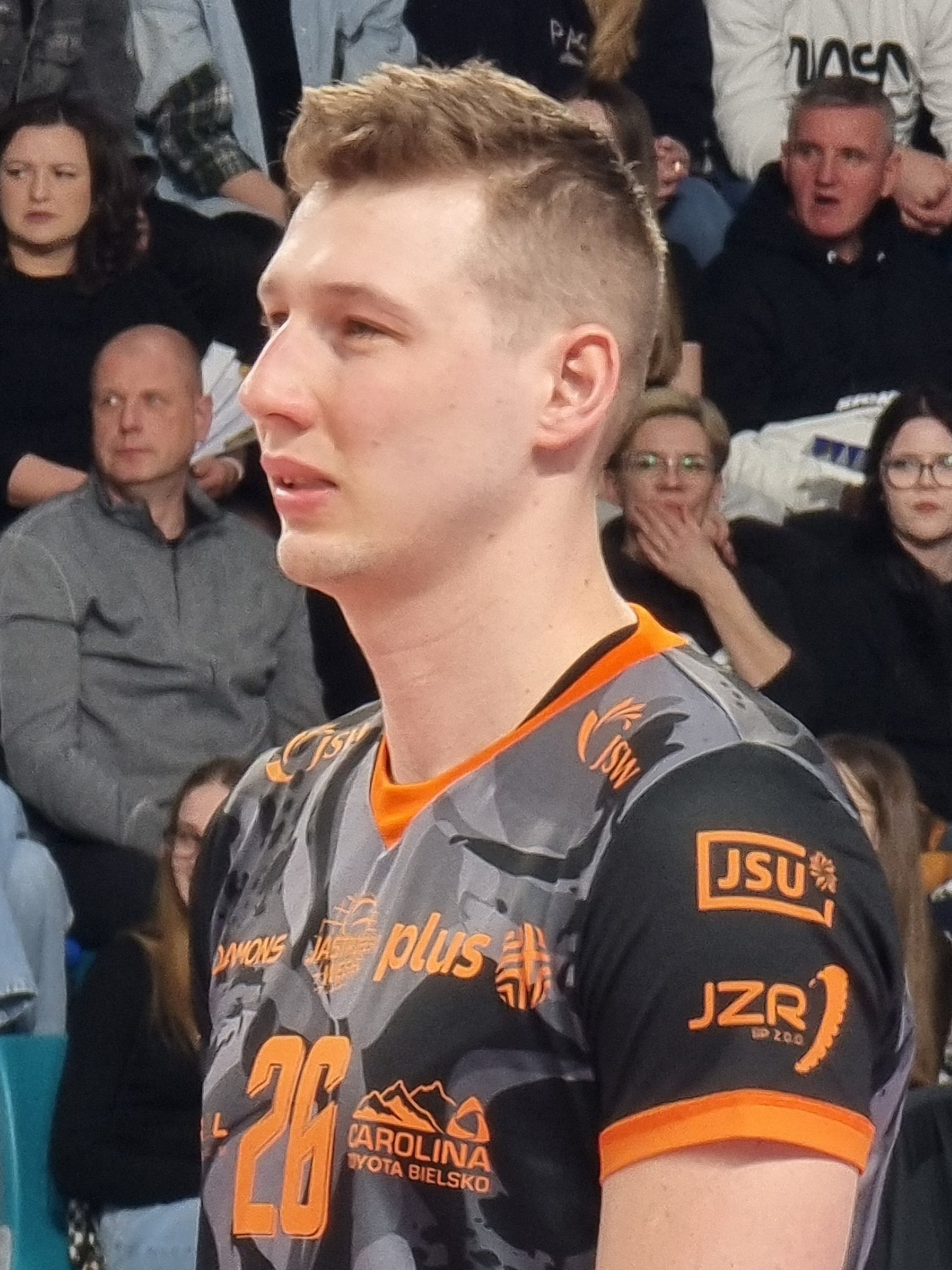
- Szymura in 2024

Personal information
- Born: 29 August 1995 (age 31); Rybnik, Poland
- Height: 1.95 m (6 ft 5 in)
- Weight: 85 kg (187 lb)
- Spike: 345 cm (136 in)
- Block: 325 cm (128 in)

Volleyball information
- Position: Outside hitter
- Current club: ZAKSA Kędzierzyn-Koźle
- Number: 13

Career
| Years | Teams |
|---|---|
| 2014–2017; 2017–2019; 2019–2020; 2020–2024; 2024– | AZS Częstochowa; ZAKSA Kędzierzyn-Koźle; GKS Katowice; Jastrzębski Węgiel; ZAKSA Kędzierzyn-Koźle |

National team
| Poland |

Rafał Szymura (born 29 August 1995) is a Polish professional volleyball player who plays as an outside hitter for ZAKSA Kędzierzyn-Koźle.

== Honours ==
=== Club ===
- CEV Champions League
  - 2022–23 – with Jastrzębski Węgiel
  - 2023–24 – with Jastrzębski Węgiel
- Domestic
  - 2018–19 Polish Cup, with ZAKSA Kędzierzyn-Koźle
  - 2018–19 Polish Championship, with ZAKSA Kędzierzyn-Koźle
  - 2020–21 Polish Championship, with Jastrzębski Węgiel
  - 2021–22 Polish SuperCup, with Jastrzębski Węgiel
  - 2022–23 Polish SuperCup, with Jastrzębski Węgiel
  - 2022–23 Polish Championship, with Jastrzębski Węgiel
  - 2023–24 Polish Championship, with Jastrzębski Węgiel

=== Youth national team ===
- 2013 CEV U19 European Championship
- 2014 CEV U20 European Championship

=== Individual awards ===
- 2013: CEV U19 European Championship – Best receiver
- 2019: Polish Cup – Best receiver
