= Alexey Nalobin =

Russian volleyball player (born 1989)

Personal information
- Full name: Alexey Dmitrovich Nalobin
- Nationality: Russian
- Born: October 3, 1989 (age 37); USSR
- Height: 2.05 m (6 ft 9 in)
- Weight: 98 kg (216 lb)
- Spike: 355 cm (140 in)
- Block: 340 cm (134 in)

Volleyball information
- Position: Middle blocker
- Current club: Araguaia Atlético Clube
- Number: 9

Career
Years	Teams
2005–2009; 2009–2013; 2013–2015; 2015–2016; 2016–2017; 2017–2018; 2018–2019; 2020–2021; 2021–2022; 2023–	Lokomotiv Chita; Yugra Nizhnevartovsk; Kuzbass Kemerovo; VfB Friedrichshafen; Dinamo Krasnodar; Dafi Społem Kielce; Montpellier Volley; CS Arcada Galați; Le Plessis-Robinson Volley-ball; Araguaia Atlético Clube
- Last updated: 29 December 2017

Alexey Dmitrovich Nalobin (born 3 October 1989) is a Russian volleyball player.

== Career ==
In 2016 he achieved silver medal of German Championship with VfB Friedrichshafen. In season 2016/17 he was a player of Russian club Dinamo Krasnodar, but due to financial problem of club, Nalobin decided to leave the team in January 2017. On January 31, 2017 he went to Polish team Dafi Społem Kielce and signed contract to the end of season 2017/18.

== Sporting achievements ==
=== Clubs ===
==== National championships ====
- 2015/2016 German Championship, with VfB Friedrichshafen
