= 2016–17 Polish Men's Volleyball Cup =

2016–17 Polish Volleyball Cup
- Sport: Volleyball
- Duration: 14–15 January 2017
- TV partner(s): Polsat Sport

Finals
- Champions: ZAKSA Kędzierzyn-Koźle (6th title)
- Finals MVP: Dawid Konarski (POL)

Seasons
- ← 2015–16 2017–18 →

The 2016–17 Polish Cup was the 60th edition of the Polish Volleyball Cup tournament.

ZAKSA Kędzierzyn-Koźle won the 6th Polish Cup in club history after beating the title defenders, PGE Skra Bełchatów.

== Final four ==
- Venue: Hala Stulecia, Wrocław
- All times are Central European Time (UTC+01:00).

Semifinals
14 January
ZAKSA Kędzierzyn-Koźle	3
Jastrzębski Węgiel	1
14 January
Lotos Trefl Gdańsk	0
PGE Skra Bełchatów	3

Final
15 January
ZAKSA Kędzierzyn-Koźle	3
PGE Skra Bełchatów	1

=== Semifinals ===
Date	Time		Score		Set 1	Set 2	Set 3	Set 4	Set 5	Total	Report
14 Jan	14:45	ZAKSA Kędzierzyn-Koźle	3–1	Jastrzębski Węgiel	25–23	23–25	27–25	25–20		100–93	Report
14 Jan	18:00	Lotos Trefl Gdańsk	0–3	PGE Skra Bełchatów	27–29	22–25	21–25			70–79	Report

=== Final ===
Date	Time		Score		Set 1	Set 2	Set 3	Set 4	Set 5	Total	Report
15 Jan	14:45	ZAKSA Kędzierzyn-Koźle	3–1	PGE Skra Bełchatów	29–27	25–27	25–20	25–18		104–92	Report

== Final standings ==
Qualified for the 2017 Polish SuperCup

Rank	Team
1st place, gold medalist(s)	ZAKSA Kędzierzyn-Koźle
2	PGE Skra Bełchatów
Semifinalists	Jastrzębski Węgiel; Lotos Trefl Gdańsk

2016–17 Polish Cup winners
ZAKSA Kędzierzyn-Koźle
6th title

== Awards ==
- Most valuable player

(Poland) Dawid Konarski (ZAKSA Kędzierzyn-Koźle)

- Best server

(Poland) Artur Szalpuk (PGE Skra Bełchatów)

- Best receiver

(France) Kévin Tillie (ZAKSA Kędzierzyn-Koźle)

- Best defender

(Poland) Robert Milczarek (PGE Skra Bełchatów)

- Best blocker

(Poland) Łukasz Wiśniewski (ZAKSA Kędzierzyn-Koźle)

- Best opposite

(Poland) Dawid Konarski (ZAKSA Kędzierzyn-Koźle)

- Best setter

(France) Benjamin Toniutti (ZAKSA Kędzierzyn-Koźle)

== See also ==
- 2016–17 PlusLiga
