= GKS Katowice (volleyball) =

Polish volleyball club

- Full name: GKS GieKSa Katowice S.A.
- Nickname: GieKSa
- Founded: 27 February 1964; 62 years ago
- Ground: Arena Katowice (Capacity: 3,002)
- Chairman: Sławomir Witek
- Manager: Emil Siewiorek
- Captain: Bartłomiej Krulicki
- League: Tauron Liga
- Website: Club home page

Uniforms
Home	Away

GKS Katowice is a professional men's volleyball team, one of the sections of the same name club based in Katowice, which competes in the top Polish volleyball league, Tauron Liga.

== Team ==
As of 2026–27 season

No.	Name	Date of birth	Position
1	(Poland) Bartłomiej Krulicki	15 September 1993 (age 33)	middle blocker
2	(Poland) Jakub Szymański	25 March 1998 (age 28)	outside hitter
4	(Poland) Bartosz Schmidt	3 June 1991 (age 35)	middle blocker
5	(Poland) Wojciech Ferens	5 April 1991 (age 35)	outside hitter
7	(Poland) Szymon Gregorowicz	7 March 1994 (age 32)	libero
8	(Serbia) Aleksa Batak	18 January 2000 (age 26)	setter
9	(Argentina) Gonzalo Quiroga	25 February 1993 (age 33)	outside hitter
10	(Poland) Damian Domagała	23 April 1998 (age 28)	opposite
11	(Poland) Michał Superlak	16 November 1993 (age 32)	opposite
12	(Poland) Wojciech Włodarczyk	28 October 1990 (age 35)	outside hitter
13	(United States) Matthew Knigge	2 June 1996 (age 30)	middle blocker
14	(Poland) Grzegorz Pająk	1 January 1987 (age 39)	setter
16	(Poland) Patryk Waloch	24 April 1995 (age 31)	libero
23	(Poland) Damian Hudzik	14 May 1998 (age 28)	middle blocker
Head coach:		(Poland) Emil Siewiorek	

== See also ==
- GKS Katowice players
- GKS Katowice coaches
