= ZAKSA Kędzierzyn-Koźle =

Polish volleyball club

- Full name: ZAKSA Spółka Akcyjna
- Founded: 1994; 32 years ago
- Ground: Hala Azoty (Capacity: 3,375)
- Chairman: Jadwiga Cichoń
- Manager: Andrea Giani
- Captain: Rafał Szymura
- League: Tauron Liga
- 2025–26: 8th place
- Website: Club home page

Uniforms
| Home | Away |

ZAKSA Kędzierzyn-Koźle, is a professional men's volleyball club based in Kędzierzyn-Koźle in southern Poland, founded in 1994. They compete in the Polish Tauron Liga.

ZAKSA have won 9 domestic league titles, 10 national cups, and three Champions League titles, which makes them one of the most successful clubs in Poland. It is the second Polish club since Płomień Milowice in 1978 to have won the most prestigious volleyball competition in Europe.

== Honours ==
=== Domestic ===
- Polish Championship

Winners (9): 1997–98, 1999–2000, 2000–01, 2001–02, 2002–03, 2015–16, 2016–17, 2018–19, 2021–22

- Polish Cup

Winners (10): 1999–2000, 2000–01, 2001–02, 2012–13, 2013–14, 2016–17, 2018–19, 2020–21, 2021–22, 2022–23

- Polish SuperCup

Winners (3): 2019–20, 2020–21, 2023–24

=== International ===
- CEV Champions League

Winners (3): 2020–21, 2021–22, 2022–23
Final Four (4): 2001–02, 2002–03, 2012–13, 2017–18

- CEV Cup

Silver (1): 2010–11

== Club history ==
=== KS Mostostal Zabrze ===
KS Mostostal Zabrze was founded on 8 March 1994 in Kędzierzyn-Koźle. The team of that time was composed of former players of Chemik Kędzierzyn, the club that ceased to exist in 1993. In 1995, the team led by Leszek Milewski won promotion to the top Polish volleyball league, and by doing that, the club made the first step on track to eventually win the championship title. In the same year, the club changed its name to KS Mostostal ZA Kędzierzyn, as a result of Grupa Azoty, the company operating in the chemical industry, becoming a shareholder of the club.

In 1997, the club from Kędzierzyn-Koźle, after spending only 2 years in the top league, was close to achieve its first championship, losing in the final to AZS Częstochowa. Both clubs were competing for the highest domestic trophies almost every season, what resulted in a long–standing rivalry in the years to come.

In 1998, Mostostal ZA Kędzierzyn led by Jan Such for the first time in club's history won its first championship, beating Morze Bałtyk Szczecin in the deciding match held in Kędzierzyn-Koźle.

=== Mostostal Azoty ===
In 1998, the club changed its name to Mostostal Azoty Kędzierzyn-Koźle. In the upcoming season, even though Mostostal reached the league finals, the club did not manage to defend the championship and had to credit the superiority of AZS Częstochowa. In the same season, the team also made a debut in the CEV Champions League, in which Mostostal finished last in its group and did not advance to the semifinals. After that season, Jan Such left the team from Kędzierzyn-Koźle and has been replaced by Waldemar Wspaniały, who led the team in next 5 years, until 2004.

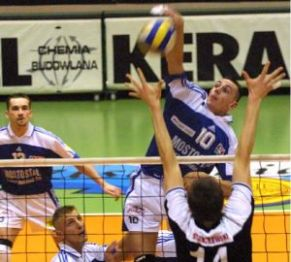
Match with Czarni Radom played in the 2000–01 Polish Volleyball League

With Waldemar Wspaniały on the bench, Mostostal became a dominant power in the league, winning 4 Polish Championships in a row (2000, 2001, 2002, 2003) and three Polish Cups (2000, 2001, 2002), the period often referred to as a golden era of Mostostal. On the international stage, the club made its way to the Champions League Final Four tournament in 2002, and managed to win a bronze medal at the 2003 edition held in Milan, defeating Paris Volley in 3 sets.

After winning the Polish title in 2003, Mostostal did not manage to keep 2 national team members; Sebastian Świderski decided to leave the club and continue his career in Italy, while Paweł Papke joined the rival club from Olsztyn. The 2003–04 season, Mostostal ended in 6th place. Waldemar Wspaniały left the club after that season and has been replaced by a Slovak coach Rastislav Chudík.

The team of Rastislav Chudík started well in the league, beating the Polish champions Jastrzębski Węgiel, however Mostosal was not doing well in the rest of the season and eventually finished 5th in the championship. The club management decided not to sign a new contract with coach Chudík, and as a result, Wojciech Drzyzga has become the new head coach of the team.

Although Mostostal fans dreamed of regaining the place at the top of the league, the 2005–06 season was the worst in club's history. Wojciech Drzyzga has been dismissed, after a series of 10 defeats in a row, and so far acting as his assistant coach, Andrzej Kubacki has become the new head coach. The club from Kędzierzyn-Koźle was not able to save that season and finished 8th in the championship.

After the infamous 2005–06 season, the club management did not specify any particular goal for the upcoming season; the team was supposed to present good volleyball. Mostostal managed to take part in the Playoff stage of the championship, and was close to defeat Jastrzębski Węgiel and move on in the competition, but had to credit the superiority of the team from Jastrzębie-Zdrój after as many as 5 matches (2–3). Eventually, Mostostal ended the season in 6th place, after 3 matches for 5th place against Asseco Resovia (1–2).

=== ZAKSA ===
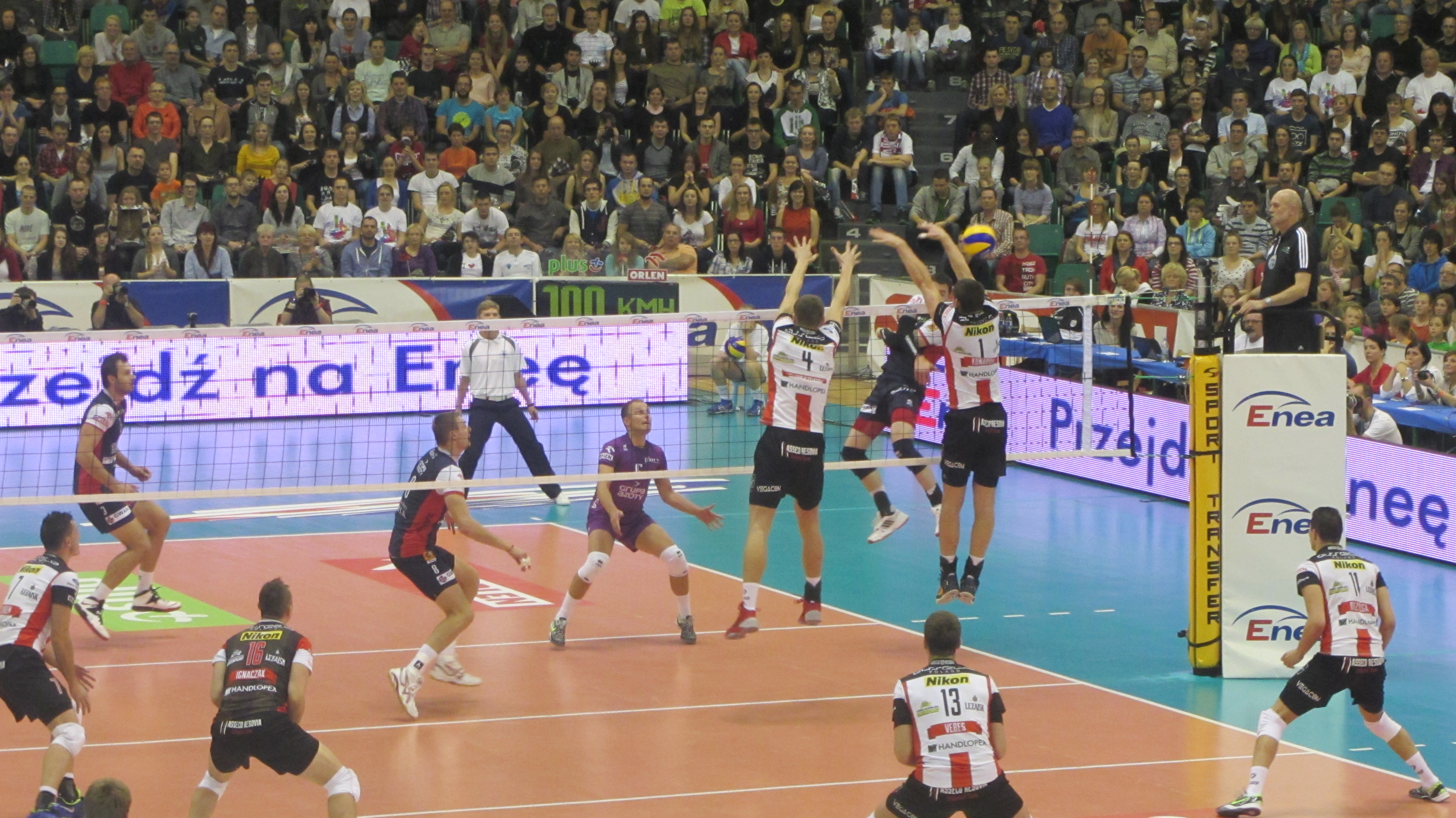
Polish SuperCup match with Resovia in 2013

The new 2007–08 season brought many changes to volleyball in Kędzierzyn-Koźle with Grupa Azoty, becoming the main shareholder of the club and at the same time, saving the club from going bankrupt. Therefore, the team has started the season under the new name of ZAKSA Kędzierzyn-Koźle. The club strengthened its ranks with Jakub Novotný who has become one of the most significant players, and the Polish national team member Łukasz Żygadło. At the end of the regular season, an unexpected defeat in Bydgoszcz complicated the situation of ZAKSA, which now in the Playoff stage of the competition, just like in the previous season had to face Jastrzębski Węgiel. The team from Kędzierzyn-Koźle has lost both to Jastrzębski Węgiel, and in 3 matches for 5th place to Asseco Resovia (1–2).

In 2008, the club management headed by Kazimierz Pietrzyk decided to entrust the team to Krzysztof Stelmach, and so far acting as the head coach, Andrzej Kubacki has become Stelmach's assistant. Before the 2008–09 PlusLiga season, ZAKSA has been heavily rebuilt with such names as Michal Masný or Michał Ruciak joining the club. After a successful regular season, in which ZAKSA finished second, the team led by Stelmach lost in the semifinals to Asseco Resovia, and was left with a match for 3rd place against Jastrzębski Węgiel. Unfortunately, ZAKSA had to credit the superiority of Jastrzębski Węgiel and eventually finished the season in 4th place. As a result, the club was granted the right to compete in the upcoming CEV Cup edition.

== Team ==
As of 2026–27 season

| No. | Name | Date of birth | Position |
|---|---|---|---|
| 1 | (Poland) Remigiusz Kapica | 28 September 2000 (age 26) | opposite |
| 5 | (United States) Quinn Isaacson | 19 February 1999 (age 27) | setter |
| 7 | (Poland) Marcel Steyer | 28 November 2007 (age 18) | libero |
| 8 | (Netherlands) Fabian Plak | 23 July 1997 (age 29) | middle blocker |
| 9 | (Poland) Marcin Kania | 14 February 1996 (age 30) | middle blocker |
| 10 | (Poland) Mateusz Rećko | 9 April 1998 (age 28) | opposite |
| 11 | (Poland) Bartosz Fijałek | 30 August 2003 (age 23) | libero |
| 12 | (Poland) Bartosz Zych | 15 July 2006 (age 20) | outside hitter |
| 13 | (Poland) Rafał Szymura | 29 August 1995 (age 31) | outside hitter |
| 17 | (Germany) Jan Zimmermann | 12 February 1993 (age 33) | setter |
| 20 | (France) Thomas Pujol | 11 February 2005 (age 21) | outside hitter |
| 23 | (Poland) Aleksander Maciejewski | 14 November 2006 (age 19) | middle blocker |
| 34 | (Poland) Szymon Jakubiszak | 13 February 1998 (age 28) | middle blocker |
| 66 | (Poland) Kamil Kosiba | 22 February 1999 (age 27) | outside hitter |
| 77 | (Poland) Marcin Krawiecki | 21 July 1998 (age 28) | setter |
| Head coach: | | (Italy) Andrea Giani | |

== Season by season ==
| Season | Tier | League | Pos. |
|---|---|---|---|
| 2008–09 | 1 | PlusLiga | 4 |
| 2009–10 | 1 | PlusLiga | 4 |
| 2010–11 | 1 | PlusLiga | 2 |
| 2011–12 | 1 | PlusLiga | 3 |
| 2012–13 | 1 | PlusLiga | 2 |
| 2013–14 | 1 | PlusLiga | 4 |
| 2014–15 | 1 | PlusLiga | 6 |
| 2015–16 | 1 | PlusLiga | 1st place, gold medalist(s) |
| 2016–17 | 1 | PlusLiga | 1st place, gold medalist(s) |

| Season | Tier | League | Pos. |
|---|---|---|---|
| 2017–18 | 1 | PlusLiga | 2 |
| 2018–19 | 1 | PlusLiga | 1st place, gold medalist(s) |
| 2019–20 | 1 | PlusLiga | 1 |
| 2020–21 | 1 | PlusLiga | 2 |
| 2021–22 | 1 | PlusLiga | 1st place, gold medalist(s) |
| 2022–23 | 1 | PlusLiga | 2 |
| 2023–24 | 1 | PlusLiga | 10 |
| 2024–25 | 1 | PlusLiga | 5 |
| 2025–26 | 1 | PlusLiga | 8 |

== Former names ==
| Years | Name |
|---|---|
| 1994–1995 | KS Mostostal Zabrze w Kędzierzynie-Koźlu |
| 1995–1998 | KS Mostostal ZA Kędzierzyn |
| 1998–2005 | Mostostal Azoty Kędzierzyn-Koźle |
| 2005–2007 | Mostostal Azoty SSA Kędzierzyn-Koźle |
| 2007–2019 | ZAKSA Kędzierzyn-Koźle |
| 2019–2024 | Grupa Azoty ZAKSA Kędzierzyn-Koźle |
| 2024–present | ZAKSA Kędzierzyn-Koźle |

== See also ==
- ZAKSA Kędzierzyn-Koźle players
- ZAKSA Kędzierzyn-Koźle coaches
- ZAKSA Kędzierzyn-Koźle squads
