= 2015–16 PlusLiga =

- League: PlusLiga
- Sport: Volleyball
- Duration: 30 October 2015 – 26 April 2016
- Games: 200
- Teams: 14
- TV partner: Polsat Sport
- League champions: ZAKSA Kędzierzyn-Koźle (6th title)

Seasons
- 2014–15 2016–17

The 2015–16 PlusLiga was the 80th season of the Polish Volleyball Championship, the 16th season as a professional league organized by the Professional Volleyball League SA (Polish: Profesjonalna Liga Piłki Siatkowej SA) under the supervision of the Polish Volleyball Federation (Polish: Polski Związek Piłki Siatkowej).

ZAKSA Kędzierzyn-Koźle won their 6th title of the Polish Champions, the first title since 2003.

== Regular season ==
Pos	Team	Pld	W	L	Pts	SW	SL	SR	SPW	SPL	SPR	Qualification
1	ZAKSA Kędzierzyn-Koźle	26	23	3	69	74	15	4.933	2144	1769	1.212	Finals
2	Asseco Resovia	26	18	8	58	66	33	2.000	2388	2072	1.153	Finals
3	PGE Skra Bełchatów	26	21	5	58	67	34	1.971	2360	2166	1.090	3rd place game
4	Lotos Trefl Gdańsk	26	18	8	50	58	43	1.349	2300	2180	1.055	3rd place game
5	Cuprum Lubin	26	15	11	46	59	44	1.341	2361	2277	1.037	
6	Cerrad Czarni Radom	26	15	11	45	55	45	1.222	2277	2164	1.052	
7	Jastrzębski Węgiel	26	13	13	40	53	52	1.019	2319	2307	1.005	
8	AZS Politechnika Warszawska	26	13	13	36	49	53	0.925	2261	2290	0.987	
9	Indykpol AZS Olsztyn	26	11	15	33	44	55	0.800	2153	2246	0.959	
10	Łuczniczka Bydgoszcz	26	11	15	32	37	53	0.698	2025	2099	0.965	
11	BBTS Bielsko-Biała	24	8	16	25	39	63	0.619	2180	2344	0.930	
12	AZS Częstochowa	25	6	19	19	33	68	0.485	2110	2318	0.910	
13	Effector Kielce	26	5	21	18	33	70	0.471	2133	2408	0.886	
14	MKS Będzin	26	5	21	17	28	67	0.418	1956	2274	0.860	

Source: PlusLiga

=== 1st round ===
Date	Time		Score		Set 1	Set 2	Set 3	Set 4	Set 5	Total	Report
30 Oct	18:00	AZS Częstochowa	1–3	Asseco Resovia	27–25	22–25	21–25	19–25		89–100	
30 Oct	18:00	BBTS Bielsko-Biała	2–3	Lotos Trefl Gdańsk	18–25	25–17	25–20	18–25	10–15	96–102	
30 Oct	18:00	Effector Kielce	1–3	PGE Skra Bełchatów	22–25	16–25	25–22	18–25		81–97	
31 Oct	14:45	MKS Będzin	2–3	Jastrzębski Węgiel	22–25	19–25	29–27	25–21	15–17	110–115	
2 Nov	20:30	Indykpol AZS Olsztyn	3–1	Łuczniczka Bydgoszcz	25–23	23–25	25–17	25–21		98–86	
2 Nov	18:00	Cerrad Czarni Radom	2–3	ZAKSA Kędzierzyn-Koźle	22–25	25–23	25–21	18–25	8–15	98–109	
30 Oct	19:00	AZS Politechnika Warszawska	3–2	Cuprum Lubin	23–25	21–25	25–20	25–17	15–13	109–100	

=== 2nd round ===
Date	Time		Score		Set 1	Set 2	Set 3	Set 4	Set 5	Total	Report
7 Nov	17:00	Cuprum Lubin	3–2	AZS Częstochowa	22–25	25–21	17–25	25–20	18–9	107–100	
6 Nov	18:00	ZAKSA Kędzierzyn-Koźle	3–0	AZS Politechnika Warszawska	25–22	25–17	28–26			78–65	
7 Nov	14:45	Łuczniczka Bydgoszcz	0–3	Cerrad Czarni Radom	17–25	11–25	15–25			43–75	
7 Nov	20:00	Jastrzębski Węgiel	3–2	Indykpol AZS Olsztyn	19–25	25–22	25–21	23–25	16–14	108–107	
7 Nov	15:00	PGE Skra Bełchatów	3–0	MKS Będzin	25–18	25–23	25–15			75–56	
7 Nov	17:00	Effector Kielce	1–3	Lotos Trefl Gdańsk	11–25	22–25	25–23	17–25		75–98	
7 Nov	17:00	Asseco Resovia	3–0	BBTS Bielsko-Biała	25–21	25–17	25–18			75–56	

=== 3rd round ===
Date	Time		Score		Set 1	Set 2	Set 3	Set 4	Set 5	Total	Report
11 Nov	18:00	AZS Częstochowa	1–3	Lotos Trefl Gdańsk	16–25	25–20	21–25	20–25		82–95	
11 Nov	14:45	PGE Skra Bełchatów	1–3	Asseco Resovia	21–25	25–16	20–25	22–25		88–91	
11 Nov	18:00	Jastrzębski Węgiel	2–3	BBTS Bielsko-Biała	22–25	22–25	25–17	25–19	13–15	107–101	
11 Nov	17:00	Łuczniczka Bydgoszcz	3–1	Effector Kielce	25–18	22–25	25–20	25–23		97–86	
11 Nov	17:00	ZAKSA Kędzierzyn-Koźle	3–0	MKS Będzin	25–10	25–17	25–18			75–45	
10 Nov	18:00	Cuprum Lubin	3–0	Indykpol AZS Olsztyn	25–18	25–18	27–25			77–61	
10 Nov	20:30	AZS Politechnika Warszawska	1–3	Cerrad Czarni Radom	19–25	25–19	22–25	15–25		81–94	

=== 4th round ===
Date	Time		Score		Set 1	Set 2	Set 3	Set 4	Set 5	Total	Report
14 Nov	17:00	AZS Częstochowa	0–3	Cerrad Czarni Radom	11–25	27–29	21–25			59–79	
14 Nov	20:30	Indykpol AZS Olsztyn	3–2	AZS Politechnika Warszawska	17–25	21–25	25–19	27–25	18–16	108–110	
14 Nov	18:00	MKS Będzin	1–3	Cuprum Lubin	26–24	20–25	22–25	22–25		90–99	
14 Nov	17:00	Effector Kielce	0–3	ZAKSA Kędzierzyn-Koźle	14–25	22–25	17–25			53–75	
13 Nov	18:00	BBTS Bielsko-Biała	1–3	Łuczniczka Bydgoszcz	19–25	25–20	15–25	24–26		83–96	
14 Nov	18:00	Asseco Resovia	2–3	Jastrzębski Węgiel	22–25	25–14	25–20	21–25	9–15	102–99	
14 Nov	14:45	PGE Skra Bełchatów	3–0	Lotos Trefl Gdańsk	25–17	25–20	25–19			75–56	

=== 5th round ===
Date	Time		Score		Set 1	Set 2	Set 3	Set 4	Set 5	Total	Report
21 Nov	15:00	PGE Skra Bełchatów	3–0	AZS Częstochowa	25–17	25–21	25–11			75–49	
22 Nov	17:00	Jastrzębski Węgiel	2–3	Lotos Trefl Gdańsk	25–20	25–20	18–25	20–25	12–15	100–105	
21 Nov	20:00	Łuczniczka Bydgoszcz	1–3	Asseco Resovia	25–23	20–25	27–29	23–25		95–102	
21 Nov	17:00	ZAKSA Kędzierzyn-Koźle	3–0	BBTS Bielsko-Biała	25–11	27–25	25–16			77–52	
20 Nov	18:00	Cuprum Lubin	3–0	Effector Kielce	31–29	25–20	25–22			81–71	
20 Nov	19:00	MKS Będzin	3–0	AZS Politechnika Warszawska	26–24	25–18	25–22			76–64	
21 Nov	14:45	Cerrad Czarni Radom	3–0	Indykpol AZS Olsztyn	25–15	25–23	25–20			75–58	

=== 6th round ===
Date	Time		Score		Set 1	Set 2	Set 3	Set 4	Set 5	Total	Report
25 Nov	18:30	AZS Częstochowa	0–3	Indykpol AZS Olsztyn	23–25	18–25	22–25			63–75	
25 Nov	19:00	MKS Będzin	0–3	Cerrad Czarni Radom	18–25	17–25	22–25			57–75	
25 Nov	18:00	Effector Kielce	2–3	AZS Politechnika Warszawska	22–25	25–21	25–21	22–25	8–15	102–107	
25 Nov	18:00	BBTS Bielsko-Biała	3–1	Cuprum Lubin	29–27	14–25	25–21	25–20		93–93	
25 Nov	20:30	Asseco Resovia	1–3	ZAKSA Kędzierzyn-Koźle	25–21	20–25	25–27	24–26		94–99	
25 Nov	19:00	Lotos Trefl Gdańsk	3–0	Łuczniczka Bydgoszcz	25–12	25–22	25–14			75–48	
25 Nov	18:00	PGE Skra Bełchatów	3–1	Jastrzębski Węgiel	22–25	25–19	25–21	25–16		97–81	

=== 7th round ===
Date	Time		Score		Set 1	Set 2	Set 3	Set 4	Set 5	Total	Report
2 Dec	20:30	Jastrzębski Węgiel	3–0	AZS Częstochowa	25–21	25–22	25–23			75–66	
27 Nov	18:00	Łuczniczka Bydgoszcz	0–3	PGE Skra Bełchatów	26–28	21–25	22–25			69–78	
28 Nov	14:45	ZAKSA Kędzierzyn-Koźle	2–3	Lotos Trefl Gdańsk	19–25	25–22	25–16	23–25	10–15	102–103	
29 Nov	20:00	Asseco Resovia	2–3	Cuprum Lubin	25–19	21–25	26–24	22–25	10–15	104–108	
30 Nov	19:00	AZS Politechnika Warszawska	3–0	BBTS Bielsko-Biała	25–22	25–21	25–18			75–61	
30 Nov	18:00	Cerrad Czarni Radom	3–1	Effector Kielce	25–17	20–25	25–20	25–15		95–77	
28 Nov	18:00	Indykpol AZS Olsztyn	3–0	MKS Będzin	25–20	25–14	25–17			75–51	

=== 8th round ===
Date	Time		Score		Set 1	Set 2	Set 3	Set 4	Set 5	Total	Report
4 Dec	18:00	AZS Częstochowa	3–1	MKS Będzin	25–19	23–25	25–20	25–19		98–83	
5 Dec	14:45	Effector Kielce	3–1	Indykpol AZS Olsztyn	25–20	25–19	23–25	25–22		98–86	
5 Dec	14:00	BBTS Bielsko-Biała	2–3	Cerrad Czarni Radom	22–25	22–25	25–18	28–26	12–15	109–109	
5 Dec	17:00	Asseco Resovia	2–3	AZS Politechnika Warszawska	24–26	21–25	25–22	25–19	14–16	109–108	
6 Dec	14:45	Lotos Trefl Gdańsk	3–2	Cuprum Lubin	22–25	25–18	30–28	24–26	18–16	119–113	
5 Dec	20:00	PGE Skra Bełchatów	2–3	ZAKSA Kędzierzyn-Koźle	17–25	25–21	20–25	25–19	10–15	97–105	
5 Dec	18:00	Jastrzębski Węgiel	3–0	Łuczniczka Bydgoszcz	25–23	28–26	25–17			78–66	

=== 9th round ===
Date	Time		Score		Set 1	Set 2	Set 3	Set 4	Set 5	Total	Report
9 Dec	18:00	Łuczniczka Bydgoszcz	3–0	AZS Częstochowa	27–25	29–27	25–13			81–65	
9 Dec	18:30	ZAKSA Kędzierzyn-Koźle	3–0	Jastrzębski Węgiel	25–20	25–20	25–21			75–61	
9 Dec	18:00	Cuprum Lubin	2–3	PGE Skra Bełchatów	21–25	25–18	19–25	25–15	10–15	100–98	
9 Dec	19:00	AZS Politechnika Warszawska	2–3	Lotos Trefl Gdańsk	28–26	23–25	21–25	25–22	10–15	107–113	
8 Dec	20:30	Cerrad Czarni Radom	3–2	Asseco Resovia	27–25	21–25	18–25	27–25	15–10	108–110	
9 Dec	18:00	Indykpol AZS Olsztyn	3–0	BBTS Bielsko-Biała	25–19	25–17	29–27			79–63	
9 Dec	19:00	MKS Będzin	1–3	Effector Kielce	25–17	22–25	20–25	17–25		84–92	

=== 10th round ===
Date	Time		Score		Set 1	Set 2	Set 3	Set 4	Set 5	Total	Report
12 Dec	14:45	AZS Częstochowa	3–2	Effector Kielce	18–25	23–25	25–16	25–21	17–15	108–102	
11 Dec	18:00	BBTS Bielsko-Biała	3–2	MKS Będzin	25–20	25–23	20–25	24–26	15–5	109–99	
12 Dec	17:00	Asseco Resovia	3–2	Indykpol AZS Olsztyn	22–25	17–25	25–17	25–12	15–10	104–89	
12 Dec	20:00	Lotos Trefl Gdańsk	3–1	Cerrad Czarni Radom	25–21	25–17	23–25	25–22		98–85	
12 Dec	15:00	PGE Skra Bełchatów	3–0	AZS Politechnika Warszawska	27–25	25–18	25–23			77–66	
12 Dec	18:00	Jastrzębski Węgiel	3–2	Cuprum Lubin	24–26	27–29	25–23	25–15	16–14	117–107	
13 Dec	17:00	Łuczniczka Bydgoszcz	0–3	ZAKSA Kędzierzyn-Koźle	22–25	20–25	18–25			60–75	

=== 11th round ===
Date	Time		Score		Set 1	Set 2	Set 3	Set 4	Set 5	Total	Report
19 Dec	17:00	ZAKSA Kędzierzyn-Koźle	3–0	AZS Częstochowa	25–18	25–14	25–23			75–55	
19 Dec	14:45	Cuprum Lubin	3–0	Łuczniczka Bydgoszcz	25–21	25–19	25–20			75–60	
21 Dec	18:00	AZS Politechnika Warszawska	3–0	Jastrzębski Węgiel	25–21	25–21	25–19			75–61	
19 Dec	20:00	Cerrad Czarni Radom	1–3	PGE Skra Bełchatów	21–25	21–25	26–24	23–25		91–99	
20 Dec	14:45	Indykpol AZS Olsztyn	3–2	Lotos Trefl Gdańsk	21–25	25–11	16–25	25–23	15–13	102–97	
20 Dec	17:00	MKS Będzin	0–3	Asseco Resovia	12–5	16–25	19–25			47–55	
18 Dec	18:00	Effector Kielce	3–1	BBTS Bielsko-Biała	25–15	25–20	20–25	25–19		95–79	

=== 12th round ===
Date	Time		Score		Set 1	Set 2	Set 3	Set 4	Set 5	Total	Report
20 Jan	18:30	AZS Częstochowa	3–2	BBTS Bielsko-Biała	26–28	18–25	25–22	25–20	15–9	109–104	
13 Jan	18:00	Asseco Resovia	3–1	Effector Kielce	25–20	25–18	23–25	25–21		98–84	
13 Jan	19:00	MKS Będzin	0–3	Lotos Trefl Gdańsk	20–25	11–25	21–25			52–75	
13 Jan	20:30	PGE Skra Bełchatów	1–3	Indykpol AZS Olsztyn	22–25	25–20	22–25	27–29		96–99	
13 Jan	18:00	Jastrzębski Węgiel	3–0	Cerrad Czarni Radom	25–22	25–23	25–21			75–66	
13 Jan	18:00	Łuczniczka Bydgoszcz	3–1	AZS Politechnika Warszawska	25–18	25–18	30–32	25–20		105–88	
13 Jan	18:30	ZAKSA Kędzierzyn-Koźle	3–0	Cuprum Lubin	25–20	25–16	25–17			75–53	

=== 13th round ===
Date	Time		Score		Set 1	Set 2	Set 3	Set 4	Set 5	Total	Report
16 Jan	17:00	AZS Częstochowa	3–0	AZS Politechnika Warszawska	25–17	25–19	25–18			75–54	
16 Jan	20:00	Cerrad Czarni Radom	2–3	Cuprum Lubin	25–23	22–25	25–20	23–25	11–15	106–108	
16 Jan	17:00	Indykpol AZS Olsztyn	0–3	ZAKSA Kędzierzyn-Koźle	18–25	15–25	20–25			53–75	
15 Jan	19:00	MKS Będzin	1–3	Łuczniczka Bydgoszcz	18–25	23–25	30–28	21–25		92–103	
17 Jan	14:45	Effector Kielce	0–3	Jastrzębski Węgiel	18–25	26–28	14–25			58–78	
16 Jan	17:00	BBTS Bielsko-Biała	1–3	PGE Skra Bełchatów	19–25	21–25	25–22	21–22		86–94	
16 Jan	14:45	Asseco Resovia	3–0	Lotos Trefl Gdańsk	25–22	28–26	25–20			78–68	

=== 14th round ===
Date	Time		Score		Set 1	Set 2	Set 3	Set 4	Set 5	Total	Report
23 Jan	17:00	Asseco Resovia	3–0	AZS Częstochowa	25–17	25–12	25–18			75–47	
24 Mar	19:00	Lotos Trefl Gdańsk	3–1	BBTS Bielsko-Biała	21–25	25–18	25–18	25–18		96–79	
23 Jan	15:00	PGE Skra Bełchatów	3–2	Effector Kielce	25–16	25–22	32–34	19–25	15–9	116–106	
22 Jan	17:00	Jastrzębski Węgiel	3–1	MKS Będzin	25–16	25–22	22–25	25–18		97–81	
23 Jan	17:00	Łuczniczka Bydgoszcz	3–1	Indykpol AZS Olsztyn	25–16	20–25	25–21	25–17		95–79	
23 Jan	14:45	ZAKSA Kędzierzyn-Koźle	3–0	Cerrad Czarni Radom	25–15	25–19	25–23			75–57	
22 Jan	18:00	Cuprum Lubin	3–0	AZS Politechnika Warszawska	25–13	25–20	25–16			75–49	

=== 15th round ===
Date	Time		Score		Set 1	Set 2	Set 3	Set 4	Set 5	Total	Report
30 Jan	17:00	AZS Częstochowa	1–3	Cuprum Lubin	18–25	21–25	25–20	20–25		84–95	
30 Jan	20:00	AZS Politechnika Warszawska	0–3	ZAKSA Kędzierzyn-Koźle	18–25	24–26	22–25			64–76	
30 Jan	17:00	Cerrad Czarni Radom	3–1	Łuczniczka Bydgoszcz	25–22	23–25	28–26	25–16		101–89	
1 Feb	18:00	Indykpol AZS Olsztyn	1–3	Jastrzębski Węgiel	21–25	20–25	25–18	33–35		99–103	
29 Jan	20:30	MKS Będzin	0–3	PGE Skra Bełchatów	23–25	19–25	16–25			58–75	
31 Jan	15:00	Lotos Trefl Gdańsk	3–1	Effector Kielce	25–23	26–28	25–23	25–19		101–93	
30 Jan	17:00	BBTS Bielsko-Biała	0–3	Asseco Resovia	19–25	23–25	25–27			67–77	

=== 16th round ===
Date	Time		Score		Set 1	Set 2	Set 3	Set 4	Set 5	Total	Report
10 Feb	17:00	Lotos Trefl Gdańsk	3–1	AZS Częstochowa	19–25	25–21	25–19	25–23		94–88	
10 Feb	18:00	Asseco Resovia	2–3	PGE Skra Bełchatów	22–25	29–31	26–24	25–23	13–15	115–118	
10 Feb	19:00	BBTS Bielsko-Biała	3–2	Jastrzębski Węgiel	25–22	25–23	23–25	23–25	15–13	111–108	
9 Feb	18:00	Effector Kielce	2–3	Łuczniczka Bydgoszcz	20–25	25–20	25–19	16–25	15–17	101–106	
10 Feb	18:00	MKS Będzin	0–3	ZAKSA Kędzierzyn-Koźle	22–25	13–25	22–25			57–75	
7 Feb	17:30	Indykpol AZS Olsztyn	3–1	Cuprum Lubin	22–25	27–25	27–25	25–19		101–94	
10 Feb	18:00	Cerrad Czarni Radom	1–3	AZS Politechnika Warszawska	25–22	27–29	13–25	21–25		86–101	

=== 17th round ===
Date	Time		Score		Set 1	Set 2	Set 3	Set 4	Set 5	Total	Report
13 Feb	17:00	Cerrad Czarni Radom	3–1	AZS Częstochowa	27–25	23–25	25–17	25–21		100–88	
13 Feb	17:00	AZS Politechnika Warszawska	3–2	Indykpol AZS Olsztyn	21–25	25–11	25–23	22–25	15–13	108–97	
13 Feb	17:00	Cuprum Lubin	3–2	MKS Będzin	23–25	25–14	25–20	23–25	15–7	111–91	
13 Feb	17:00	ZAKSA Kędzierzyn-Koźle	3–0	Effector Kielce	25–22	25–18	25–14			75–54	
12 Feb	18:00	Łuczniczka Bydgoszcz	3–1	BBTS Bielsko-Biała	25–23	25–20	20–25	25–19		95–87	
13 Feb	20:00	Jastrzębski Węgiel	0–3	Asseco Resovia	15–25	15–25	14–25			44–75	
13 Feb	14:45	Lotos Trefl Gdańsk	3–0	PGE Skra Bełchatów	25–17	25–20	25–16			75–53	

=== 18th round ===
Date	Time		Score		Set 1	Set 2	Set 3	Set 4	Set 5	Total	Report
20 Feb	17:00	AZS Częstochowa	2–3	PGE Skra Bełchatów	16–25	27–25	20–25	26–24	9–15	98–114	
20 Feb	14:45	Lotos Trefl Gdańsk	1–3	Jastrzębski Węgiel	15–25	25–20	19–25	17–25		76–95	
20 Feb	20:00	Asseco Resovia	3–0	Łuczniczka Bydgoszcz	25–22	25–18	25–21			75–61	
20 Feb	14:00	BBTS Bielsko-Biała	0–3	ZAKSA Kędzierzyn-Koźle	15–25	21–25	21–25			57–75	
20 Feb	15:00	Effector Kielce	3–2	Cuprum Lubin	20–25	25–27	28–26	25–21	16–14	114–113	
17 Feb	19:00	AZS Politechnika Warszawska	2–3	MKS Będzin	23–25	25–27	25–23	26–24	9–15	108–114	
19 Feb	18:00	Indykpol AZS Olsztyn	3–2	Cerrad Czarni Radom	12–25	25–22	25–22	19–25	15–13	96–107	

=== 19th round ===
Date	Time		Score		Set 1	Set 2	Set 3	Set 4	Set 5	Total	Report
23 Feb	18:00	Indykpol AZS Olsztyn	3–1	AZS Częstochowa	25–21	25–12	22–25	25–21		97–79	
24 Feb	18:00	Cerrad Czarni Radom	3–0	MKS Będzin	25–15	25–18	26–24			76–57	
24 Feb	19:00	AZS Politechnika Warszawska	3–0	Effector Kielce	27–25	25–22	25–15			77–62	
24 Feb	18:00	Cuprum Lubin	1–3	BBTS Bielsko-Biała	22–25	20–25	25–20	19–25		86–95	
24 Feb	20:30	ZAKSA Kędzierzyn-Koźle	3–1	Asseco Resovia	22–25	25–19	25–22	25–21		97–87	
24 Feb	18:00	Łuczniczka Bydgoszcz	0–3	Lotos Trefl Gdańsk	21–25	23–25	23–25			67–75	
24 Feb	18:00	Jastrzębski Węgiel	2–3	PGE Skra Bełchatów	23–25	27–25	25–27	25–20	10–15	110–112	

=== 20th round ===
Date	Time		Score		Set 1	Set 2	Set 3	Set 4	Set 5	Total	Report
27 Feb	20:00	AZS Częstochowa	2–3	Jastrzębski Węgiel	25–22	25–21	19–25	13–25	10–15	92–108	
27 Feb	15:00	PGE Skra Bełchatów	0–3	Łuczniczka Bydgoszcz	23–25	21–25	22–25			66–75	
28 Feb	14:45	Lotos Trefl Gdańsk	3–1	ZAKSA Kędzierzyn-Koźle	25-23	21–25	25–23	25–20		96–68	
27 Feb	14:45	Cuprum Lubin	3–0	Asseco Resovia	25–22	32–30	25–23			82–75	
27 Feb	17:00	BBTS Bielsko-Biała	0–3	AZS Politechnika Warszawska	21–25	20–25	23–25			64–75	
27 Feb	17:00	Effector Kielce	1–3	Cerrad Czarni Radom	23–25	14–25	25–23	18–25		80–98	
27 Feb	18:00	MKS Będzin	3–0	Indykpol AZS Olsztyn	25–23	25–19	25–23			75–65	

=== 21st round ===
Date	Time		Score		Set 1	Set 2	Set 3	Set 4	Set 5	Total	Report
6 Mar	17:00	MKS Będzin	3–1	AZS Częstochowa	25–22	26–24	21–25	25–21		97–92	
4 Mar	17:30	Indykpol AZS Olsztyn	3–0	Effector Kielce	25–19	25–18	25–22			75–59	
4 Mar	18:00	Cerrad Czarni Radom	3–2	BBTS Bielsko-Biała	23–25	23–25	25–18	25–22	15–9	111–99	
6 Mar	19:00	AZS Politechnika Warszawska	1–3	Asseco Resovia	18–25	25–21	23–25	18–25		84–96	
5 Mar	20:00	Cuprum Lubin	3–0	Lotos Trefl Gdańsk	25–21	25–20	25–17			75–58	
6 Mar	14:45	ZAKSA Kędzierzyn-Koźle	2–3	PGE Skra Bełchatów	25–23	19–25	25–21	23–25	12–15	104–109	
4 Mar	18:00	Łuczniczka Bydgoszcz	0–3	Jastrzębski Węgiel	20–25	18–25	26–28			64–78	

=== 22nd round ===
Date	Time		Score		Set 1	Set 2	Set 3	Set 4	Set 5	Total	Report
11 Mar	18:00	AZS Częstochowa	0–3	Łuczniczka Bydgoszcz	20–25	21–25	22–25			63–75	
12 Mar	14:45	Jastrzębski Węgiel	0–3	ZAKSA Kędzierzyn-Koźle	15–25	23–25	18–25			56–75	
12 Mar	15:00	PGE Skra Bełchatów	3–1	Cuprum Lubin	25–19	26–28	25–19	25–21		101–87	
12 Mar	20:00	Lotos Trefl Gdańsk	0–3	AZS Politechnika Warszawska	28–30	28–30	20–25			76–85	
11 Mar	18:00	Asseco Resovia	3–1	Cerrad Czarni Radom	25–19	23–25	25–22	25–20		98–86	
10 Mar	18:00	BBTS Bielsko-Biała	3–1	Indykpol AZS Olsztyn	26–24	25–21	23–25	25–18		99–88	
11 Mar	18:00	Effector Kielce	1–3	MKS Będzin	25–23	26–28	22–25	19–25		92–101	

=== 23rd round ===
Date	Time		Score		Set 1	Set 2	Set 3	Set 4	Set 5	Total	Report
19 Mar	15:00	Effector Kielce	2–3	AZS Częstochowa	25–23	18–25	10–25	25–23	12–15	90–111	
21 Mar	18:00	MKS Będzin	0–3	BBTS Bielsko-Biała	25–27	23–25	23–25			71–77	
16 Mar	20:30	Indykpol AZS Olsztyn	0–3	Asseco Resovia	23–25	17–25	17–25			57–75	
18 Mar	18:00	Cerrad Czarni Radom	3–1	Lotos Trefl Gdańsk	25–16	27–25	23–25	25–22		100–88	
20 Mar	14:45	AZS Politechnika Warszawska	1–3	PGE Skra Bełchatów	21–25	24–26	25–17	23–25		93–93	
9 Mar	18:00	Cuprum Lubin	3–1	Jastrzębski Węgiel	25–19	20–25	36–34	25–16		106–94	
19 Mar	20:00	ZAKSA Kędzierzyn-Koźle	3–0	Łuczniczka Bydgoszcz	25–21	25–17	25–22			75–60	

=== 24th round ===
Date	Time		Score		Set 1	Set 2	Set 3	Set 4	Set 5	Total	Report
31 Mar	18:00	AZS Częstochowa	0–3	ZAKSA Kędzierzyn-Koźle	14–25	26–28	21–25			61–78	
24 Mar	20:30	Łuczniczka Bydgoszcz	0–3	Cuprum Lubin	16–25	28–30	20–25			64–80	
2 Apr	17:00	Jastrzębski Węgiel	2–3	AZS Politechnika Warszawska	22–25	22–25	25–13	25–21	16–18	110–102	
2 Apr	18:00	PGE Skra Bełchatów	3–0	Cerrad Czarni Radom	25–21	25–14	25–20			75–55	
30 Mar	20:30	Lotos Trefl Gdańsk	3–1	Indykpol AZS Olsztyn	25–22	25–17	20–25	25–17		95–81	
31 Mar	18:00	Asseco Resovia	3–1	MKS Będzin	25–19	23–25	25–18	25–18		98–80	
1 Apr	20:00	BBTS Bielsko-Biała	3–0	Effector Kielce	25–21	25–17	25–18			75–56	

=== 25th round ===
Date	Time		Score		Set 1	Set 2	Set 3	Set 4	Set 5	Total	Report
6 Apr	18:00	BBTS Bielsko-Biała	1–3	AZS Częstochowa	21–25	23–25	25–18	18–25		87–93	
23 Mar	20:30	Effector Kielce	0–3	Asseco Resovia	18–25	16–25	14–25			48–75	
12 Apr	19:00	Lotos Trefl Gdańsk	3–1	MKS Będzin	25–16	28–30	25–15	25–22		103–83	
6 Apr	18:00	Indykpol AZS Olsztyn	0–3	PGE Skra Bełchatów	19–25	27–29	23–25			69–79	
6 Apr	18:00	Cerrad Czarni Radom	3–0	Jastrzębski Węgiel	25–17	25–23	25–19			75–59	
6 Apr	19:00	AZS Politechnika Warszawska	3–1	Łuczniczka Bydgoszcz	25–22	25–27	25–23	25–18		100–90	
5 Apr	20:30	Cuprum Lubin	0–3	ZAKSA Kędzierzyn-Koźle	26–28	16–25	21–25			63–78	

=== 26th round ===
Date	Time		Score		Set 1	Set 2	Set 3	Set 4	Set 5	Total	Report
9 Apr	17:00	AZS Politechnika Warszawska	3–2	AZS Częstochowa	25–10	25–19	20–25	21–25	15–13	106–92	
9 Apr	14:45	Cuprum Lubin	3–0	Cerrad Czarni Radom	25–22	26–24	25–23			76–69	
10 Apr	14:45	ZAKSA Kędzierzyn-Koźle	3–0	Indykpol AZS Olsztyn	25–22	25–21	25–16			75–59	
9 Apr	17:00	Łuczniczka Bydgoszcz	3–0	MKS Będzin	25–17	25–17	25–15			75–49	
11 Apr	18:00	Jastrzębski Węgiel	2–3	Effector Kielce	23–25	25–21	15–25	25–17	14–16	102–104	
9 Apr	15:00	PGE Skra Bełchatów	3–1	BBTS Bielsko-Biała	23–25	25–19	25–22	27–25		100–91	
6 Apr	20:30	Lotos Trefl Gdańsk	0–3	Asseco Resovia	23–25	20–25	20–75			63–125	

== Final round ==
=== 13th place ===
- (to 2 victories)

Date	Time		Score		Set 1	Set 2	Set 3	Set 4	Set 5	Total	Report
20 Apr	18:00	MKS Będzin	1–3	Effector Kielce	25–22	19–25	20–25	16–25		80–97	
24 Apr	16:00	Effector Kielce	3–2	MKS Będzin	18–25	25–13	22–25	25–22	19–17	109–102	

=== 11th place ===
- (to 2 victories)

Date	Time		Score		Set 1	Set 2	Set 3	Set 4	Set 5	Total	Report
15 Apr	18:00	AZS Częstochowa	3–0	BBTS Bielsko-Biała	27–25	25–16	25–18			77–59	
24 Apr	18:00	BBTS Bielsko-Biała	1–3	AZS Częstochowa	23–25	25–22	16–25	19–25		83–97	

=== 9th place ===
- (to 2 victories)

Date	Time		Score		Set 1	Set 2	Set 3	Set 4	Set 5	Total	Report
14 Apr	19:00	Łuczniczka Bydgoszcz	3–0	Indykpol AZS Olsztyn	28–26	25–20	25–23			78–69	
20 Apr	18:00	Indykpol AZS Olsztyn	3–1	Łuczniczka Bydgoszcz	25–19	22–25	25–23	25–16		97–83	
21 Apr	18:00	Indykpol AZS Olsztyn	2–3	Łuczniczka Bydgoszcz	25–15	25–23	18–25	23–25	12–15	103–103	

=== 7th place ===
- (to 2 victories)

Date	Time		Score		Set 1	Set 2	Set 3	Set 4	Set 5	Total	Report
18 Apr	19:00	AZS Politechnika Warszawska	1–3	Jastrzębski Węgiel	18–25	18–25	25–20	21–25		82–95	
23 Apr	18:00	Jastrzębski Węgiel	2–3	AZS Politechnika Warszawska	26–24	22–25	25–13	19–25	11–15	103–102	
24 Apr	18:00	Jastrzębski Węgiel	3–0	AZS Politechnika Warszawska	28–26	25–22	25–21			78–69	

=== 5th place ===
- (to 2 victories)

Date	Time		Score		Set 1	Set 2	Set 3	Set 4	Set 5	Total	Report
15 Apr	18:00	Cerrad Czarni Radom	0–3	Cuprum Lubin	23–25	15–25	22–25			60–75	
22 Apr	18:00	Cuprum Lubin	3–2	Cerrad Czarni Radom	25–22	20–25	23–25	25–19	15–9	108–100	

=== 3rd place ===
- (to 3 victories)

Date	Time		Score		Set 1	Set 2	Set 3	Set 4	Set 5	Total	Report
21 Apr	18:00	PGE Skra Bełchatów	3–0	Lotos Trefl Gdańsk	26–24	25–15	25–21			76–60	
22 Apr	18:00	PGE Skra Bełchatów	3–0	Lotos Trefl Gdańsk	25–13	25–10	25–21			75–44	
26 Apr	18:00	Lotos Trefl Gdańsk	0–3	PGE Skra Bełchatów	11–25	19–25	17–25			47–75	

=== Finals ===
- (to 3 victories)

Date	Time		Score		Set 1	Set 2	Set 3	Set 4	Set 5	Total	Report
21 Apr	20:30	ZAKSA Kędzierzyn-Koźle	3–0	Asseco Resovia	25–20	25–14	25–18			75–52	
22 Apr	20:30	ZAKSA Kędzierzyn-Koźle	3–0	Asseco Resovia	25–18	25–19	25–21			75–58	
26 Apr	20:30	Asseco Resovia	0–3	ZAKSA Kędzierzyn-Koźle	23–25	21–25	13–25			57–75	

== Final standings ==
Qualified for the 2016–17 CEV Champions League

Rank	Team
1st place, gold medalist(s)	ZAKSA Kędzierzyn-Koźle
2nd place, silver medalist(s)	Asseco Resovia
3rd place, bronze medalist(s)	PGE Skra Bełchatów
4	Lotos Trefl Gdańsk
5	Cuprum Lubin
6	Cerrad Czarni Radom
7	Jastrzębski Węgiel
8	AZS Politechnika Warszawska
9	Łuczniczka Bydgoszcz
10	Indykpol AZS Olsztyn
11	AZS Częstochowa
12	BBTS Bielsko-Biała
13	Effector Kielce
14	MKS Będzin

2016 Polish Champions

6th title

== Squads ==
Asseco Resovia
No.	Name	Date of birth	Height	Position
1	(Poland) Bartosz Kurek	29 August 1988	2.05 m (6 ft 9 in)	opposite
2	(United States) Thomas Jaeschke	4 September 1993	2.00 m (6 ft 7 in)	outside hitter
4	(Poland) Piotr Nowakowski	18 December 1987	2.05 m (6 ft 9 in)	middle blocker
5	(Poland) Lukáš Ticháček	12 January 1982	1.93 m (6 ft 4 in)	setter
6	(Poland) Dawid Dryja	21 July 1992	2.01 m (6 ft 7 in)	middle blocker
7	(Poland) Aleh Akhrem	12 March 1983	1.94 m (6 ft 4 in)	outside hitter
8	(France) Julien Lyneel	15 April 1990	1.92 m (6 ft 4 in)	outside hitter
9	(Ukraine) Dmytro Pashytskyy	29 November 1987	2.05 m (6 ft 9 in)	middle blocker
10	(Germany) Jochen Schöps	8 October 1983	2.00 m (6 ft 7 in)	opposite
11	(Poland) Fabian Drzyzga	3 January 1990	1.96 m (6 ft 5 in)	setter
12	(Poland) Łukasz Perłowski	3 April 1984	2.04 m (6 ft 8 in)	middle blocker
14	(Poland) Aleksander Śliwka	24 May 1995	1.98 m (6 ft 6 in)	outside hitter
16	(Poland) Krzysztof Ignaczak	15 May 1978	1.88 m (6 ft 2 in)	libero
17	(Bulgaria) Nikolay Penchev	22 May 1992	1.96 m (6 ft 5 in)	outside hitter
18	(Poland) Damian Wojtaszek	7 September 1988	1.80 m (5 ft 11 in)	libero
19	(United States) Russell Holmes	1 July 1982	2.05 m (6 ft 9 in)	middle blocker
20	(Poland) Dominik Witczak	2 January 1983	1.98 m (6 ft 6 in)	opposite
Head coach:		(Poland) Andrzej Kowal		

AZS Częstochowa
No.	Name	Date of birth	Height	Position
1	(Poland) Tomasz Kowalski	12 June 1991	2.02 m (6 ft 8 in)	setter
2	(Poland) Łukasz Polański	29 January 1989	2.05 m (6 ft 9 in)	middle blocker
3	(Poland) Stanisław Wawrzyńczyk	4 January 1990	2.00 m (6 ft 7 in)	outside hitter
5	(France) Rafael Redwitz	12 August 1980	1.88 m (6 ft 2 in)	setter
6	(Poland) Bartłomiej Lipiński	16 November 1996	2.01 m (6 ft 7 in)	opposite
7	(Poland) Michał Szalacha	15 January 1994	2.02 m (6 ft 8 in)	middle blocker
8	(Poland) Adrian Stańczak	17 February 1987	1.85 m (6 ft 1 in)	libero
10	(Poland) Bartosz Buniak	8 October 1985	0 m (0 in)	middle blocker
12	(Poland) Kacper Stelmach	5 May 1997	2.03 m (6 ft 8 in)	outside hitter
13	(Poland) Rafał Szymura	29 August 1995	1.97 m (6 ft 6 in)	outside hitter
14	(Brazil) Felipe Airton Banderò	12 June 1988	2.02 m (6 ft 8 in)	opposite
15	(Poland) Bartłomiej Janus	19 January 1995	0 m (0 in)	middle blocker
16	(Slovakia) Matej Paták	8 June 1990	1.97 m (6 ft 6 in)	outside hitter
17	(Poland) Jakub Bik	17 February 1992	1.83 m (6 ft 0 in)	libero
20	(Poland) Kamil Szymura	24 January 1999	1.85 m (6 ft 1 in)	libero
Head coach:		(Poland) Michał Bąkiewicz		

AZS Politechnika Warszawska
No.	Name	Date of birth	Height	Position
1	(Poland) Jakub Kowalczyk	26 June 1986	2.00 m (6 ft 7 in)	middle blocker
2	(Poland) Maciej Olenderek	16 October 1992	1.78 m (5 ft 10 in)	libero
3	(Poland) Przemysław Smoliński	27 November 1992	2.01 m (6 ft 7 in)	middle blocker
4	(Poland) Jakub Radomski	16 March 1988	2.03 m (6 ft 8 in)	outside hitter
5	(Poland) Paweł Zagumny	18 October 1977	2.00 m (6 ft 7 in)	setter
6	(Poland) Paweł Halaba	14 December 1995	1.94 m (6 ft 4 in)	outside hitter
7	(Poland) Bartłomiej Lemański	19 March 1996	2.16 m (7 ft 1 in)	middle blocker
8	(Poland) Waldemar Świrydowicz	18 December 1986	2.05 m (6 ft 9 in)	middle blocker
9	(France) Guillaume Samica	28 September 1981	1.97 m (6 ft 6 in)	outside hitter
10	(Poland) Michał Filip	31 August 1994	1.97 m (6 ft 6 in)	opposite
11	(Poland) Łukasz Łapszyński	23 September 1993	1.94 m (6 ft 4 in)	outside hitter
13	(Poland) Jan Firlej	26 September 1996	1.88 m (6 ft 2 in)	setter
15	(Poland) Krzysztof Wierzbowski	18 July 1988	1.97 m (6 ft 6 in)	outside hitter
19	(Poland) Dominik Jaglarski	20 June 1997	1.87 m (6 ft 2 in)	libero
20	(Poland) Paweł Mikołajczak	20 June 1988	1.95 m (6 ft 5 in)	opposite
Head coach:		(Poland) Jakub Bednaruk		

BBTS Bielsko-Biała
No.	Name	Date of birth	Height	Position
1	(Poland) Bartłomiej Krulicki	15 September 1993	2.05 m (6 ft 9 in)	middle blocker
3	(Canada) Daniel Lewis	3 April 1976	1.89 m (6 ft 2 in)	libero
4	(Poland) Wojciech Siek	10 May 1994	2.05 m (6 ft 9 in)	middle blocker
5	(Poland) Krzysztof Modzelewski	5 February 1992	1.96 m (6 ft 5 in)	outside hitter
6	(Poland) Bartłomiej Neroj	22 November 1984	2.00 m (6 ft 7 in)	setter
7	(Poland) Grzegorz Pilarz	12 February 1980	1.88 m (6 ft 2 in)	setter
8	(Poland) Bartosz Janeczek	12 July 1987	1.98 m (6 ft 6 in)	opposite
9	(Ukraine) Dmytro Bogdan	23 July 1989	2.02 m (6 ft 8 in)	middle blocker
10	(Poland) Łukasz Koziura	8 June 1992	0 m (0 in)	libero
12	(Poland) Paweł Gryc	9 January 1996	2.08 m (6 ft 10 in)	opposite
13	(Poland) Marcin Wika	9 November 1983	1.94 m (6 ft 4 in)	outside hitter
16	(Ukraine) Serhiy Kapelus	22 October 1982	1.91 m (6 ft 3 in)	outside hitter
17	(Poland) Mateusz Sacharewicz	23 October 1989	1.98 m (6 ft 6 in)	middle blocker
18	(Poland) Kamil Kwasowski	13 September 1990	1.97 m (6 ft 6 in)	outside hitter
19	(Poland) Paweł Stabrawa	23 October 1996	2.03 m (6 ft 8 in)	opposite
Head coach:		(Poland) Krzysztof Stelmach		

Cerrad Czarni Radom
No.	Name	Date of birth	Height	Position
1	(Poland) Bartłomiej Bołądź	28 September 1994	2.04 m (6 ft 8 in)	opposite
2	(Poland) Michał Ostrowski	29 March 1990	2.03 m (6 ft 8 in)	opposite
3	(Belgium) Igor Grobelny	8 June 1993	1.94 m (6 ft 4 in)	outside hitter
4	(Poland) Daniel Pliński	10 December 1978	2.04 m (6 ft 8 in)	middle blocker
5	(Poland) Bartłomiej Grzechnik	8 February 1993	2.00 m (6 ft 7 in)	middle blocker
6	(Poland) Wojciech Żaliński	8 January 1988	1.96 m (6 ft 5 in)	outside hitter
8	(Poland) Jakub Zwiech	6 November 1996	2.04 m (6 ft 8 in)	middle blocker
9	(Poland) Adam Kowalski	16 September 1994	1.80 m (5 ft 11 in)	libero
10	(Germany) Lukas Kampa	29 November 1986	1.93 m (6 ft 4 in)	setter
11	(Poland) Patryk Szczurek	6 February 1991	0 m (0 in)	setter
12	(Poland) Artur Szalpuk	20 March 1995	2.01 m (6 ft 7 in)	outside hitter
13	(Poland) Łukasz Zugaj	27 January 1993	1.92 m (6 ft 4 in)	setter
15	(United States) Zack La Cavera	14 October 1992	1.96 m (6 ft 5 in)	opposite
16	(Poland) Radosław Zbierski	14 April 1988	0 m (0 in)	libero
17	(Serbia) Neven Majstorović	17 March 1989	1.93 m (6 ft 4 in)	outside hitter
Head coach:		(Argentina) Raúl Lozano		

Cuprum Lubin
No.	Name	Date of birth	Height	Position
1	(Poland) Mateusz Malinowski	6 May 1992	1.98 m (6 ft 6 in)	opposite
2	(Poland) Łukasz Kaczmarek	29 June 1994	2.04 m (6 ft 8 in)	opposite
3	(Estonia) Keith Pupart	19 March 1985	1.95 m (6 ft 5 in)	outside hitter
5	(Poland) Adam Michalski	24 December 1988	2.01 m (6 ft 7 in)	middle blocker
6	(Poland) Paweł Rusek	21 January 1983	1.83 m (6 ft 0 in)	libero
7	(Poland) Maciej Gorzkiewicz	16 February 1984	1.92 m (6 ft 4 in)	setter
8	(Germany) Marcus Böhme	25 August 1985	2.11 m (6 ft 11 in)	middle blocker
9	(Estonia) Robert Täht	15 August 1993	1.92 m (6 ft 4 in)	outside hitter
10	(Poland) Dawid Gunia	1 January 1987	2.03 m (6 ft 8 in)	middle blocker
11	(Poland) Marcin Kryś	15 January 1983	1.92 m (6 ft 4 in)	libero
12	(Poland) Wojciech Włodarczyk	28 October 1990	2.00 m (6 ft 7 in)	outside hitter
13	(Poland) Szymon Romać	1 October 1992	1.96 m (6 ft 5 in)	opposite
17	(Poland) Marcin Możdżonek	9 February 1985	2.11 m (6 ft 11 in)	middle blocker
18	(Poland) Grzegorz Łomacz	1 October 1987	1.88 m (6 ft 2 in)	setter
Head coach:		(Romania) Gheorghe Crețu		

Effector Kielce
No.	Name	Date of birth	Height	Position
1	(Poland) Sławomir Jungiewicz	21 June 1989	1.96 m (6 ft 5 in)	opposite
2	(Poland) Jakub Gontarewicz	14 May 1997	1.90 m (6 ft 3 in)	setter
4	(Poland) Marcin Komenda	24 May 1996	1.98 m (6 ft 6 in)	setter
6	(Poland) Patryk Więckowski	27 March 1998	2.02 m (6 ft 8 in)	opposite
7	(Poland) Michał Kędzierski	9 August 1994	1.94 m (6 ft 4 in)	setter
8	(Ukraine) Andriy Orobko	10 August 1997	2.01 m (6 ft 7 in)	middle blocker
9	(Poland) Sławomir Stolc	23 January 1993	0 m (0 in)	outside hitter
11	(Norway) Andreas Takvam	4 June 1993	2.01 m (6 ft 7 in)	middle blocker
12	(Ukraine) Igor Vitiuk	29 January 1988	1.97 m (6 ft 6 in)	outside hitter
13	(Poland) Adrian Buchowski	30 September 1991	1.94 m (6 ft 4 in)	outside hitter
14	(Poland) Jacek Ziemnicki	30 May 1997	1.89 m (6 ft 2 in)	outside hitter
15	(Poland) Mateusz Bieniek	5 April 1994	2.08 m (6 ft 10 in)	middle blocker
17	(Poland) Jędrzej Maćkowiak	17 October 1992	0 m (0 in)	middle blocker
18	(Poland) Damian Sobczak	13 December 1991	1.84 m (6 ft 0 in)	libero
19	(Poland) Szymon Biniek	30 July 1995	1.88 m (6 ft 2 in)	libero
20	(Poland) Mateusz Guzik	1 January 1997	1.82 m (6 ft 0 in)	setter
21	(Poland) Adrian Romać	21 September 1997	1.96 m (6 ft 5 in)	opposite
22	(Poland) Bartłomiej Oniszk	8 August 1997	0 m (0 in)	middle blocker
Head coach:		(Poland) Dariusz Daszkiewicz		

Indykpol AZS Olsztyn
No.	Name	Date of birth	Height	Position
1	(Poland) Marcin Waliński	24 October 1990	1.95 m (6 ft 5 in)	outside hitter
2	(Belgium) Bram Van Den Dries	14 August 1989	2.06 m (6 ft 9 in)	opposite
2	(Finland) Mikko Oivanen	26 May 1986	1.98 m (6 ft 6 in)	opposite
3	(Poland) Maciej Ostaszyk	22 December 1995	1.99 m (6 ft 6 in)	middle blocker
5	(Poland) Miłosz Zniszczoł	2 July 1986	2.01 m (6 ft 7 in)	middle blocker
6	(Serbia) Filip Stoilović	11 October 1992	1.95 m (6 ft 5 in)	outside hitter
7	(Poland) Bartosz Bednorz	25 July 1994	2.01 m (6 ft 7 in)	outside hitter
8	(Poland) Krzysztof Gulak	29 August 1996	1.96 m (6 ft 5 in)	outside hitter
9	(Poland) Paweł Adamajtis	30 August 1990	1.99 m (6 ft 6 in)	opposite
11	(Poland) Maciej Zajder	31 January 1988	0 m (0 in)	middle blocker
12	(Poland) Paweł Woicki	19 June 1983	1.82 m (6 ft 0 in)	setter
13	(Poland) Krzysztof Bieńkowski	19 June 1995	1.98 m (6 ft 6 in)	setter
14	(Poland) Michał Potera	6 March 1988	1.83 m (6 ft 0 in)	libero
15	(Netherlands) Thomas Koelewijn	18 December 1988	2.07 m (6 ft 9 in)	middle blocker
17	(Poland) Jakub Zabłocki	10 April 1995	1.80 m (5 ft 11 in)	libero
18	(Poland) Leszek Wójcik	6 November 1996	1.95 m (6 ft 5 in)	outside hitter
Head coach:		(Italy) Andrea Gardini		

Jastrzębski Węgiel
No.	Name	Date of birth	Height	Position
1	(Poland) Patryk Strzeżek	19 November 1989	2.03 m (6 ft 8 in)	opposite
2	(Poland) Maciej Muzaj	21 May 1994	2.08 m (6 ft 10 in)	opposite
3	(Poland) Jakub Popiwczak	17 April 1996	1.80 m (5 ft 11 in)	libero
5	(Poland) Radosław Gil	25 January 1997	1.91 m (6 ft 3 in)	setter
6	(Poland) Damian Boruch	14 December 1989	2.09 m (6 ft 10 in)	middle blocker
7	(Slovakia) Michal Masný	14 August 1979	1.82 m (6 ft 0 in)	setter
9	(Canada) Jason DeRocco	19 September 1989	2.01 m (6 ft 7 in)	outside hitter
10	(Canada) Toontje Van Lankvelt	1 July 1984	1.97 m (6 ft 6 in)	outside hitter
11	(Poland) Wojciech Sobala	12 May 1988	2.07 m (6 ft 9 in)	middle blocker
12	(Poland) Konrad Formela	8 March 1995	1.94 m (6 ft 4 in)	outside hitter
16	(Poland) Piotr Hain	26 February 1991	2.07 m (6 ft 9 in)	middle blocker
17	(Israel) Alexander Shafranovich	2 April 1983	1.90 m (6 ft 3 in)	outside hitter
18	(Poland) Adrian Mihułka	10 July 1989	1.82 m (6 ft 0 in)	libero
Head coach:		(Australia) Mark Lebedew		

Lotos Trefl Gdańsk
No.	Name	Date of birth	Height	Position
1	(Poland) Sławomir Zemlik	3 November 1992	2.00 m (6 ft 7 in)	outside hitter
2	(Poland) Wojciech Grzyb	4 January 1981	2.05 m (6 ft 9 in)	middle blocker
3	(Poland) Piotr Gacek	16 September 1978	1.85 m (6 ft 1 in)	libero
4	(Poland) Przemysław Stępień	7 February 1994	1.85 m (6 ft 1 in)	setter
5	(Italy) Marco Falaschi	18 September 1987	1.87 m (6 ft 2 in)	setter
7	(Poland) Damian Schulz	26 February 1990	2.08 m (6 ft 10 in)	opposite
8	(Poland) Karol Behrendt	14 April 1995	1.97 m (6 ft 6 in)	middle blocker
9	(Germany) Sebastian Schwarz	2 October 1985	1.97 m (6 ft 6 in)	outside hitter
10	(Poland) Bartosz Gawryszewski	22 August 1985	2.02 m (6 ft 8 in)	middle blocker
11	(United States) Murphy Troy	31 May 1989	2.02 m (6 ft 8 in)	opposite
12	(Poland) Artur Ratajczak	18 September 1990	2.06 m (6 ft 9 in)	middle blocker
15	(Poland) Mateusz Mika	21 January 1991	2.06 m (6 ft 9 in)	outside hitter
17	(Poland) Miłosz Hebda	11 March 1991	2.06 m (6 ft 9 in)	outside hitter
18	(Poland) Mateusz Czunkiewicz	16 December 1996	0 m (0 in)	libero
19	(Poland) Kamil Dębski	17 October 1997	1.98 m (6 ft 6 in)	outside hitter
Head coach:		(Italy) Andrea Anastasi		

Łuczniczka Bydgoszcz
No.	Name	Date of birth	Height	Position
1	(Poland) Jan Nowakowski	17 May 1994	2.02 m (6 ft 8 in)	middle blocker
2	(Belgium) Kevin Klinkenberg	4 October 1990	1.97 m (6 ft 6 in)	outside hitter
3	(Poland) Michał Żurek	3 June 1988	1.81 m (5 ft 11 in)	libero
4	(Poland) Wojciech Jurkiewicz	21 June 1977	2.05 m (6 ft 9 in)	middle blocker
5	(Poland) Wojciech Ferens	5 April 1991	1.94 m (6 ft 4 in)	outside hitter
6	(Poland) Jakub Jarosz	10 February 1987	1.97 m (6 ft 6 in)	opposite
7	(Brazil) Murilo Radke	31 January 1989	1.98 m (6 ft 6 in)	setter
8	(Poland) Mateusz Siwicki	23 July 1996	2.00 m (6 ft 7 in)	middle blocker
9	(Poland) Łukasz Wiese	24 March 1993	1.95 m (6 ft 5 in)	outside hitter
10	(Poland) Dawid Murek	24 July 1977	1.95 m (6 ft 5 in)	outside hitter
11	(Poland) Michał Ruciak	22 August 1983	1.90 m (6 ft 3 in)	outside hitter
12	(Poland) Jan Lesiuk	7 June 1996	1.90 m (6 ft 3 in)	outside hitter
13	(Poland) Grzegorz Kosok	2 March 1986	2.05 m (6 ft 9 in)	middle blocker
16	(Poland) Bartosz Krzysiek	19 February 1990	2.07 m (6 ft 9 in)	opposite
17	(Poland) Nikodem Wolański	19 January 1994	1.98 m (6 ft 6 in)	setter
18	(Poland) Tomasz Bonisławski	22 January 1991	1.88 m (6 ft 2 in)	libero
Head coach:		(Poland) Piotr Makowski		

MKS Będzin
No.	Name	Date of birth	Height	Position
1	(Poland) Mariusz Schamlewski	16 January 1991	1.98 m (6 ft 6 in)	middle blocker
2	(Poland) Mateusz Wikło	20 February 1997	1.82 m (6 ft 0 in)	setter
3	(Netherlands) Tijmen Laane	2 February 1988	2.06 m (6 ft 9 in)	outside hitter
4	(Poland) Maciej Pawliński	2 February 1983	1.93 m (6 ft 4 in)	outside hitter
5	(Poland) Piotr Lipiński	4 January 1979	1.95 m (6 ft 5 in)	setter
5	(Canada) TJ Sanders	14 December 1991	1.91 m (6 ft 3 in)	setter
6	(Israel) Viacheslav Batchkala	27 July 1994	2.04 m (6 ft 8 in)	middle blocker
7	(Poland) Mariusz Gaca	20 January 1984	2.00 m (6 ft 7 in)	middle blocker
8	(Poland) Jakub Oczko	27 December 1981	1.93 m (6 ft 4 in)	setter
9	(Poland) Sebastian Warda	18 January 1989	2.04 m (6 ft 8 in)	middle blocker
10	(Poland) Bartosz Kaczmarek	17 January 1991	1.84 m (6 ft 0 in)	libero
11	(Australia) Harrison Peacock	31 January 1991	1.95 m (6 ft 5 in)	setter
12	(Poland) Mateusz Piotrowski	24 June 1991	0 m (0 in)	opposite
13	(Poland) Michał Żuk	4 July 1985	1.96 m (6 ft 5 in)	outside hitter
14	(Poland) Jakub Peszko	1 April 1992	1.93 m (6 ft 4 in)	outside hitter
15	(Poland) Paweł Stysiał	30 January 1997	1.85 m (6 ft 1 in)	libero
17	(Poland) Michał Kamiński	17 May 1987	2.10 m (6 ft 11 in)	opposite
18	(Poland) Dawid Żłobecki	4 April 1997	1.96 m (6 ft 5 in)	libero
Head coach:		(Canada) Stelio DeRocco		

PGE Skra Bełchatów
No.	Name	Date of birth	Height	Position
1	(Serbia) Srećko Lisinac	17 May 1992	2.05 m (6 ft 9 in)	middle blocker
2	(Poland) Mariusz Wlazły	4 August 1983	1.94 m (6 ft 4 in)	opposite
3	(Poland) Wiktor Nowak	21 May 1999	0 m (0 in)	setter
4	(Poland) Mariusz Marcyniak	5 March 1992	2.06 m (6 ft 9 in)	middle blocker
5	(Poland) Bartosz Pełka	15 June 1997	1.85 m (6 ft 1 in)	outside hitter
6	(Poland) Karol Kłos	8 August 1989	2.01 m (6 ft 7 in)	middle blocker
7	(Argentina) Facundo Conte	25 August 1989	1.97 m (6 ft 6 in)	outside hitter
8	(Poland) Andrzej Wrona	27 December 1988	2.06 m (6 ft 9 in)	middle blocker
9	(Poland) Marcin Janusz	31 July 1994	1.95 m (6 ft 5 in)	setter
10	(Argentina) Nicolás Uriarte	21 March 1990	1.89 m (6 ft 2 in)	setter
11	(Serbia) Mihajlo Stanković	5 June 1993	1.99 m (6 ft 6 in)	outside hitter
12	(Poland) Adam Surgut	23 December 1996	1.94 m (6 ft 4 in)	outside hitter
13	(Poland) Michał Winiarski	28 September 1983	2.00 m (6 ft 7 in)	outside hitter
14	(Poland) Marcel Gromadowski	19 December 1985	2.03 m (6 ft 8 in)	opposite
15	(Spain) Israel Rodríguez	27 August 1981	1.95 m (6 ft 5 in)	outside hitter
16	(Poland) Kacper Piechocki	17 February 1995	1.85 m (6 ft 1 in)	libero
17	(Poland) Robert Milczarek	28 November 1983	1.88 m (6 ft 2 in)	libero
18	(Poland) Nicolas Maréchal	4 March 1987	1.98 m (6 ft 6 in)	outside hitter
Head coach:		(Spain) Miguel Ángel Falasca → (France) Philippe Blain		

ZAKSA Kędzierzyn-Koźle
No.	Name	Date of birth	Height	Position
1	(Poland) Paweł Zatorski	21 June 1990	1.84 m (6 ft 0 in)	libero
2	(France) Kévin Tillie	2 November 1990	2.00 m (6 ft 7 in)	outside hitter
4	(Poland) Krzysztof Rejno	22 February 1993	2.03 m (6 ft 8 in)	middle blocker
6	(Poland) Dawid Konarski	31 August 1989	1.98 m (6 ft 6 in)	opposite
7	(Poland) Rafał Buszek	28 April 1987	1.96 m (6 ft 5 in)	outside hitter
8	(Poland) Yuriy Gladyr	8 July 1984	2.02 m (6 ft 8 in)	middle blocker
9	(Poland) Łukasz Wiśniewski	3 February 1989	1.98 m (6 ft 6 in)	middle blocker
12	(Poland) Grzegorz Bociek	6 June 1991	2.07 m (6 ft 9 in)	opposite
13	(Poland) Kamil Semeniuk	16 July 1996	1.94 m (6 ft 4 in)	outside hitter
14	(Poland) Grzegorz Pająk	1 January 1987	1.96 m (6 ft 5 in)	setter
15	(Belgium) Sam Deroo	24 April 1992	2.03 m (6 ft 8 in)	outside hitter
16	(France) Benjamin Toniutti	30 October 1989	1.83 m (6 ft 0 in)	setter
18	(Poland) Korneliusz Banach	25 January 1994	1.84 m (6 ft 0 in)	libero
19	(Poland) Patryk Czarnowski	1 November 1985	2.04 m (6 ft 8 in)	outside hitter
Head coach:		(Italy) Ferdinando De Giorgi		

== See also ==
- 2015–16 CEV Champions League
- 2015–16 CEV Cup
