= 2014–15 PlusLiga =

- League: PlusLiga
- Sport: Volleyball
- Duration: 4 October 2014 – 6 May 2015
- Games: 238
- Teams: 14
- TV partner: Polsat Sport
- League champions: Asseco Resovia (7th title)

Seasons
- 2013–14 2015–16

The 2014–15 PlusLiga was the 79th season of the Polish Volleyball Championship, the 15th season as a professional league organized by the Professional Volleyball League SA (Polish: Profesjonalna Liga Piłki Siatkowej SA) under the supervision of the Polish Volleyball Federation (Polish: Polski Związek Piłki Siatkowej).

The number of teams competing in this season was increased from 12 to 14.

Asseco Resovia won their 7th title of the Polish Champions.

== Regular season ==
Pos	Team	Pld	W	L	Pts	SW	SL	SR	SPW	SPL	SPR	Qualification
1	Asseco Resovia	26	22	4	67	72	26	2.769	2323	2029	1.145	Playoffs
2	PGE Skra Bełchatów	26	22	4	64	70	22	3.182	2194	1914	1.146	Playoffs
3	Lotos Trefl Gdańsk	26	19	7	54	64	39	1.641	2370	2203	1.076	Playoffs
4	Jastrzębski Węgiel	26	18	8	52	62	39	1.590	2360	2156	1.095	Playoffs
5	Cuprum Lubin	26	17	9	50	62	42	1.476	2352	2273	1.035	Playoffs
6	Transfer Bydgoszcz	26	16	10	50	58	42	1.381	2280	2148	1.061	Playoffs
7	ZAKSA Kędzierzyn-Koźle	26	15	11	45	53	41	1.293	2127	2060	1.033	Playoffs
8	Cerrad Czarni Radom	26	10	16	34	45	52	0.865	2162	2206	0.980	Playoffs
9	AZS Politechnika Warszawska	26	11	15	32	44	58	0.759	2208	2353	0.938	
10	Indykpol AZS Olsztyn	26	8	18	23	36	63	0.571	2077	2266	0.917	
11	BBTS Bielsko-Biała	26	8	18	22	33	63	0.524	2056	2233	0.921	
12	Effector Kielce	26	7	19	19	31	67	0.463	2086	2319	0.900	
13	AZS Częstochowa	26	5	21	18	30	65	0.462	2033	2224	0.914	
14	MKS Banimex Będzin	26	4	22	16	29	70	0.414	2064	2308	0.894	

Source: PlusLiga

=== 1st round ===
Date	Time		Score		Set 1	Set 2	Set 3	Set 4	Set 5	Total	Report
3 Oct	18:30	AZS Częstochowa	0–3	ZAKSA Kędzierzyn-Koźle	21–25	18–25	20–25			59–75	
4 Oct	14:45	MKS Banimex Będzin	1–3	PGE Skra Bełchatów	21–25	25–23	13–25	18–25		77–98	
4 Oct	17:00	Jastrzębski Węgiel	3–0	BBTS Bielsko-Biała	25–23	25–18	25–18			75–59	
4 Oct	17:00	Transfer Bydgoszcz	2–3	AZS Politechnika Warszawska	25–23	25–21	23–25	16–25	13–15	102–109	
5 Oct	15:30	Lotos Trefl Gdańsk	3–1	Indykpol AZS Olsztyn	25–20	15–25	25–14	25–23		90–82	
5 Oct	17:00	Effector Kielce	0–3	Cerrad Czarni Radom	16–25	22–25	21–25			59–75	
6 Oct	18:00	Cuprum Lubin	1–3	Asseco Resovia	20–25	25–20	17–25	17–25		79–95	

=== 2nd round ===
Date	Time		Score		Set 1	Set 2	Set 3	Set 4	Set 5	Total	Report
10 Oct	17:00	Lotos Trefl Gdańsk	3–0	ZAKSA Kędzierzyn-Koźle	25–20	25–20	25–18			75–58	
10 Oct	18:00	Cuprum Lubin	0–3	PGE Skra Bełchatów	15–25	20–25	22–25			57–75	
11 Oct	14:45	Indykpol AZS Olsztyn	2–3	Transfer Bydgoszcz	25–20	25–20	23–25	9–25	12–15	94–105	
11 Oct	17:00	Jastrzębski Węgiel	3–2	AZS Częstochowa	23–25	25–18	25–11	26–28	15–13	114–95	
11 Oct	17:00	Asseco Resovia	3–0	BBTS Bielsko-Biała	25–15	25–23	25–19			75–57	
11 Oct	17:00	Cerrad Czarni Radom	3–0	MKS Banimex Będzin	25–22	25–17	25–22			75–61	
11 Oct	18:00	AZS Politechnika Warszawska	3–2	Effector Kielce	13–25	25–20	19–25	25–21	19–17	101–108	

=== 3rd round ===
Date	Time		Score		Set 1	Set 2	Set 3	Set 4	Set 5	Total	Report
15 Oct	18:00	Asseco Resovia	3–1	MKS Banimex Będzin	19–25	25–23	26–24	25–16		95–88	
15 Oct	18:00	Jastrzębski Węgiel	0–3	PGE Skra Bełchatów	22–25	21–25	22–25			65–75	
15 Oct	18:00	Indykpol AZS Olsztyn	3–2	BBTS Bielsko-Biała	25–22	22–25	25–18	24–26	15–13	111–104	
15 Oct	18:00	Cerrad Czarni Radom	2–3	Lotos Trefl Gdańsk	22–25	25–23	25–23	17–25	11–15	100–111	
15 Oct	18:00	Effector Kielce	0–3	Transfer Bydgoszcz	22–25	21–25	19–25			62–75	
15 Oct	19:15	ZAKSA Kędzierzyn-Koźle	2–3	Cuprum Lubin	21–25	23–25	25–22	26–24	11–15	106–111	
15 Oct	20:30	AZS Politechnika Warszawska	3–0	AZS Częstochowa	25–18	25–23	28–26			78–67	

=== 4th round ===
Date	Time		Score		Set 1	Set 2	Set 3	Set 4	Set 5	Total	Report
18 Oct	14:45	Asseco Resovia	3–2	Jastrzębski Węgiel	25–27	25–15	18–25	25–22	15–12	108–101	
18 Oct	17:00	AZS Częstochowa	3–0	Cerrad Czarni Radom	25–21	25–19	25–22			75–62	
18 Oct	18:00	Cuprum Lubin	3–1	Indykpol AZS Olsztyn	21–25	25–23	25–23	25–20		96–91	
18 Oct	18:00	MKS Banimex Będzin	1–3	Transfer Bydgoszcz	16–25	25–18	17–25	23–25		81–93	
19 Oct	14:45	PGE Skra Bełchatów	3–0	ZAKSA Kędzierzyn-Koźle	25–12	25–21	25–21			75–54	
19 Oct	15:30	Lotos Trefl Gdańsk	3–0	Effector Kielce	25–16	25–15	25–19			75–50	
19 Oct	17:00	BBTS Bielsko-Biała	3–2	AZS Politechnika Warszawska	26–24	24–26	25–19	26–28	16–14	117–111	

=== 5th round ===
Date	Time		Score		Set 1	Set 2	Set 3	Set 4	Set 5	Total	Report
22 Oct	18:00	Jastrzębski Węgiel	3–1	MKS Banimex Będzin	25–18	25–12	23–25	25–18		98–73	
22 Oct	18:00	Indykpol AZS Olsztyn	0–3	PGE Skra Bełchatów	18–25	14–25	15–25			47–75	
22 Oct	18:00	Effector Kielce	0–3	AZS Częstochowa	23–25	37–39	22–25			82–89	
22 Oct	18:00	Transfer Bydgoszcz	1–3	Lotos Trefl Gdańsk	25–22	30–32	23–25	21–25		99–104	
22 Oct	19:00	AZS Politechnika Warszawska	3–1	Cuprum Lubin	25–21	25–20	17–25	25–15		92–81	
22 Oct	19:00	Cerrad Czarni Radom	3–1	BBTS Bielsko-Biała	25–27	25–21	25–23	26–24		101–95	
22 Oct	20:30	ZAKSA Kędzierzyn-Koźle	0–3	Asseco Resovia	26–28	23–25	18–25			67–78	

=== 6th round ===
Date	Time		Score		Set 1	Set 2	Set 3	Set 4	Set 5	Total	Report
25 Oct	15:00	PGE Skra Bełchatów	3–0	AZS Politechnika Warszawska	25–17	26–24	25–16			76–57	
25 Oct	15:00	Asseco Resovia	3–0	Indykpol AZS Olsztyn	25–20	25–16	29–27			79–63	
25 Oct	18:00	Cuprum Lubin	3–1	Cerrad Czarni Radom	25–22	25–22	21–25	25–21		96–90	
25 Oct	18:00	Jastrzębski Węgiel	3–1	ZAKSA Kędzierzyn-Koźle	19–25	25–18	25–16	25–18		94–77	
26 Oct	18:00	AZS Częstochowa	1–3	Transfer Bydgoszcz	25–17	18–25	16–25	21–25		80–92	
26 Oct	19:00	Lotos Trefl Gdańsk	3–0	MKS Banimex Będzin	25–20	26–24	25–23			76–67	
26 Oct	19:00	BBTS Bielsko-Biała	3–2	Effector Kielce	21–25	25–19	25–22	21–25	15–11	107–102	

=== 7th round ===
Date	Time		Score		Set 1	Set 2	Set 3	Set 4	Set 5	Total	Report
29 Oct	18:00	Indykpol AZS Olsztyn	2–3	Jastrzębski Węgiel	24–26	7–25	27–25	30–28	11–15	99–119	
29 Oct	18:00	Effector Kielce	3–2	Cuprum Lubin	25–22	13–25	21–25	25–20	16–14	100–106	
29 Oct	18:00	Transfer Bydgoszcz	3–1	BBTS Bielsko-Biała	25–17	18–25	25–17	25–19		93–78	
29 Oct	18:30	AZS Częstochowa	1–3	Lotos Trefl Gdańsk	25–23	21–25	19–25	21–25		86–98	
29 Oct	19:00	ZAKSA Kędzierzyn-Koźle	3–0	MKS Banimex Będzin	25–22	25–15	25–16			75–53	
29 Oct	19:00	AZS Politechnika Warszawska	0–3	Asseco Resovia	18–25	17–25	19–25			54–75	
29 Oct	20:30	Cerrad Czarni Radom	2–3	PGE Skra Bełchatów	17–25	25–23	25–22	18–25	9–15	94–110	

=== 8th round ===
Date	Time		Score		Set 1	Set 2	Set 3	Set 4	Set 5	Total	Report
8 Nov	18:00	MKS Banimex Będzin	3–1	AZS Częstochowa	25–22	14–25	25–22	25–18		89–87	
7 Nov	18:30	BBTS Bielsko-Biała	1–3	Lotos Trefl Gdańsk	25–20	19–25	14–25	22–25		80–95	
8 Nov	18:00	Cuprum Lubin	2–3	Transfer Bydgoszcz	25–23	19–25	21–25	25–22	11–15	101–110	
8 Nov	15:00	PGE Skra Bełchatów	3–1	Effector Kielce	18–25	25–18	25–23	25–16		93–82	
9 Nov	17:00	Cerrad Czarni Radom	1–3	Asseco Resovia	26–28	25–19	21–25	26–28		98–100	
8 Nov	14:45	AZS Politechnika Warszawska	2–3	Jastrzębski Węgiel	21–25	18–25	25–22	25–22	18–20	107–114	
8 Nov	17:00	ZAKSA Kędzierzyn-Koźle	3–1	Indykpol AZS Olsztyn	32–34	25–19	25–15	25–19		107–87	

=== 9th round ===
Date	Time		Score		Set 1	Set 2	Set 3	Set 4	Set 5	Total	Report
12 Nov	18:00	Indykpol AZS Olsztyn	3–2	MKS Banimex Będzin	25–22	22–25	25–21	21–25	15–7	108–100	
12 Nov	19:00	ZAKSA Kędzierzyn-Koźle	3–1	AZS Politechnika Warszawska	23–25	25–20	25–15	25–23		98–83	
12 Nov	18:00	Jastrzębski Węgiel	3–1	Cerrad Czarni Radom	25–19	25–22	26–28	25–20		101–89	
12 Nov	18:00	Effector Kielce	1–3	Asseco Resovia	13–25	20–25	25–22	19–25		77–97	
12 Nov	20:30	Transfer Bydgoszcz	0–3	PGE Skra Bełchatów	27–29	23–25	17–25			67–79	
12 Nov	18:30	Lotos Trefl Gdańsk	0–3	Cuprum Lubin	16–25	22–25	20–25			58–75	
12 Nov	18:30	AZS Częstochowa	3–0	BBTS Bielsko-Biała	25–18	25–22	25–17			75–57	

=== 10th round ===
Date	Time		Score		Set 1	Set 2	Set 3	Set 4	Set 5	Total	Report
15 Nov	18:00	MKS Banimex Będzin	0–3	BBTS Bielsko-Biała	19–25	23–25	21–25			63–75	
15 Nov	18:00	Cuprum Lubin	3–1	AZS Częstochowa	25–23	25–14	22–25	25–19		97–81	
16 Nov	14:45	PGE Skra Bełchatów	3–2	Lotos Trefl Gdańsk	29–27	25–19	28–30	19–25	16–14	117–115	
15 Nov	14:45	Asseco Resovia	3–0	Transfer Bydgoszcz	25–18	25–22	25–20			75–60	
15 Nov	17:00	Jastrzębski Węgiel	3–0	Effector Kielce	25–19	25–19	25–21			75–59	
15 Nov	17:00	ZAKSA Kędzierzyn-Koźle	3–0	Cerrad Czarni Radom	25–16	25–22	25–20			75–58	
15 Nov	17:00	Indykpol AZS Olsztyn	1–3	AZS Politechnika Warszawska	15–25	25–21	30–32	16–25		86–103	

=== 11th round ===
Date	Time		Score		Set 1	Set 2	Set 3	Set 4	Set 5	Total	Report
22 Nov	17:00	AZS Politechnika Warszawska	3–1	MKS Banimex Będzin	25–14	16–25	27–25	25–20		93–84	
23 Nov	17:00	Cerrad Czarni Radom	3–1	Indykpol AZS Olsztyn	25–18	14–25	25–13	25–22		89–78	
22 Nov	14:45	Effector Kielce	1–3	ZAKSA Kędzierzyn-Koźle	17–25	27–25	20–25	19–25		83–100	
21 Nov	18:00	Transfer Bydgoszcz	3–1	Jastrzębski Węgiel	22–25	27–25	31–29	25–22		105–101	
23 Nov	18:00	Lotos Trefl Gdańsk	3–2	Asseco Resovia	25–20	22–25	25–16	14–25	17–15	103–101	
22 Nov	17:00	AZS Częstochowa	0–3	PGE Skra Bełchatów	23–25	20–25	20–25			63–75	
21 Nov	18:00	BBTS Bielsko-Biała	0–3	Cuprum Lubin	17–25	20–25	24–26			61–76	

=== 12th round ===
Date	Time		Score		Set 1	Set 2	Set 3	Set 4	Set 5	Total	Report
26 Nov	19:00	MKS Banimex Będzin	1–3	Cuprum Lubin	28–26	28–30	22–25	23–25		101–106	
26 Nov	18:00	PGE Skra Bełchatów	3–0	BBTS Bielsko-Biała	25–22	25–17	25–15			75–54	
26 Nov	18:00	Asseco Resovia	3–0	AZS Częstochowa	25–17	25–16	25–22			75–55	
26 Nov	20:30	Jastrzębski Węgiel	2–3	Lotos Trefl Gdańsk	25–20	22–25	19–25	25–19	15–17	106–106	
26 Nov	19:00	ZAKSA Kędzierzyn-Koźle	3–2	Transfer Bydgoszcz	25–23	25–20	20–25	17–25	15–9	102–102	
26 Nov	18:00	Indykpol AZS Olsztyn	3–0	Effector Kielce	25–19	25–20	25–22			75–61	
26 Nov	19:00	AZS Politechnika Warszawska	0–3	Cerrad Czarni Radom	19–25	18–25	29–31			66–81	

=== 13th round ===
Date	Time		Score		Set 1	Set 2	Set 3	Set 4	Set 5	Total	Report
3 Dec	19:00	MKS Banimex Będzin	0–3	Effector Kielce	25–27	24–26	25–27			74–80	
28 Nov	18:00	Transfer Bydgoszcz	3–0	Cerrad Czarni Radom	25–21	25–21	25–11			75–53	
29 Nov	18:00	Lotos Trefl Gdańsk	3–2	AZS Politechnika Warszawska	25–17	21–25	25–19	20–25	16–14	107–100	
30 Nov	18:00	AZS Częstochowa	0–3	Indykpol AZS Olsztyn	14–25	18–25	23–25			55–75	
29 Nov	19:00	BBTS Bielsko-Biała	0–3	ZAKSA Kędzierzyn-Koźle	18–25	23–25	18–25			59–75	
30 Nov	17:00	Cuprum Lubin	1–3	Jastrzębski Węgiel	25–22	20–25	23–25	16–25		84–97	
30 Nov	14:45	PGE Skra Bełchatów	3–0	Asseco Resovia	25–19	25–20	25–20			75–59	

=== 14th round ===
Date	Time		Score		Set 1	Set 2	Set 3	Set 4	Set 5	Total	Report
6 Dec	18:00	PGE Skra Bełchatów	1–3	MKS Banimex Będzin	26–24	18–25	20–25	17–25		81–99	
7 Dec	14:45	Asseco Resovia	2–3	Cuprum Lubin	19–25	23–25	25–15	25–15	13–15	105–95	
6 Dec	17:00	BBTS Bielsko-Biała	2–3	Jastrzębski Węgiel	25–23	25–22	20–25	19–25	15–17	104–112	
6 Dec	17:00	ZAKSA Kędzierzyn-Koźle	3–0	AZS Częstochowa	25–21	25–23	25–16			75–60	
6 Dec	14:45	Indykpol AZS Olsztyn	1–3	Lotos Trefl Gdańsk	20–25	25–21	12–25	20–25		77–96	
4 Dec	19:00	AZS Politechnika Warszawska	1–3	Transfer Bydgoszcz	15–25	19–25	27–25	23–25		84–100	
8 Dec	18:00	Cerrad Czarni Radom	2–3	Effector Kielce	25–22	25–21	29–31	16–25	12–15	107–114	

=== 15th round ===
Date	Time		Score		Set 1	Set 2	Set 3	Set 4	Set 5	Total	Report
13 Dec	18:00	MKS Banimex Będzin	2–3	Cerrad Czarni Radom	25–19	25–21	24–26	20–25	8–15	102–106	
12 Dec	18:00	Effector Kielce	3–1	AZS Politechnika Warszawska	23–25	27–25	25–22	25–20		100–92	
12 Dec	18:00	Transfer Bydgoszcz	3–0	Indykpol AZS Olsztyn	25–20	25–22	25–21			75–63	
13 Dec	14:45	ZAKSA Kędzierzyn-Koźle	1–3	Lotos Trefl Gdańsk	24–26	16–25	25–22	22–25		87–98	
12 Dec	16:30	AZS Częstochowa	0–3	Jastrzębski Węgiel	21–25	11–25	20–25			52–75	
12 Dec	18:00	BBTS Bielsko-Biała	1–3	Asseco Resovia	20–25	20–25	25–23	23–25		88–98	
13 Dec	15:00	PGE Skra Bełchatów	3–2	Cuprum Lubin	19–25	22–25	25–19	25–17	15–10	106–96	

=== 16th round ===
Date	Time		Score		Set 1	Set 2	Set 3	Set 4	Set 5	Total	Report
20 Dec	18:00	MKS Banimex Będzin	0–3	Asseco Resovia	18–25	17–25	22–25			57–75	
21 Dec	14:45	PGE Skra Bełchatów	2–3	Jastrzębski Węgiel	25–20	27–29	23–25	25–18	11–15	111–107	
20 Dec	18:00	Cuprum Lubin	3–0	ZAKSA Kędzierzyn-Koźle	25–19	25–22	25–16			75–57	
20 Dec	17:00	BBTS Bielsko-Biała	3–0	Indykpol AZS Olsztyn	25–16	28–26	25–19			78–61	
22 Dec	18:00	AZS Częstochowa	2–3	AZS Politechnika Warszawska	21–25	23–25	25–17	25–20	10–15	104–102	
19 Dec	19:00	Lotos Trefl Gdańsk	3–0	Cerrad Czarni Radom	25–10	27–25	25–15			77–50	
20 Dec	17:00	Transfer Bydgoszcz	3–0	Effector Kielce	25–14	25–19	25–18			75–51	

=== 17th round ===
Date	Time		Score		Set 1	Set 2	Set 3	Set 4	Set 5	Total	Report
28 Dec	16:00	Transfer Bydgoszcz	3–0	MKS Banimex Będzin	25–18	25–17	25–18			75–53	
7 Jan	18:00	Effector Kielce	0–3	Lotos Trefl Gdańsk	9–25	20–25	22–25			51–75	
28 Dec	17:00	Cerrad Czarni Radom	3–0	AZS Częstochowa	25–18	25–22	25–18			75–58	
28 Dec	14:00	AZS Politechnika Warszawska	3–0	BBTS Bielsko-Biała	25–16	25–23	25–22			75–61	
29 Dec	18:00	Indykpol AZS Olsztyn	0–3	Cuprum Lubin	19–25	17–25	18–25			54–75	
30 Dec	16:30	ZAKSA Kędzierzyn-Koźle	3–0	PGE Skra Bełchatów	25–18	25–18	25–17			75–53	
28 Dec	17:00	Jastrzębski Węgiel	0–3	Asseco Resovia	24–26	20–25	10–25			54–76	

=== 18th round ===
Date	Time		Score		Set 1	Set 2	Set 3	Set 4	Set 5	Total	Report
2 Jan	18:00	MKS Banimex Będzin	0–3	Jastrzębski Węgiel	19–25	19–25	21–25			59–75	
4 Jan	14:45	Asseco Resovia	3–0	ZAKSA Kędzierzyn-Koźle	25–13	25–22	25–12			75–47	
3 Jan	15:00	PGE Skra Bełchatów	3–0	Indykpol AZS Olsztyn	25–21	25–14	26–24			76–59	
3 Jan	18:00	Cuprum Lubin	3–0	AZS Politechnika Warszawska	29–27	25–17	25–17			79–61	
3 Jan	14:45	BBTS Bielsko-Biała	0–3	Cerrad Czarni Radom	17–25	17–25	19–25			53–75	
4 Jan	18:00	AZS Częstochowa	1–3	Effector Kielce	28–26	16–25	24–26	21–25		89–102	
3 Jan	18:00	Lotos Trefl Gdańsk	3–2	Transfer Bydgoszcz	20–25	26–24	16–25	25–23	15–10	102–107	

=== 19th round ===
Date	Time		Score		Set 1	Set 2	Set 3	Set 4	Set 5	Total	Report
9 Jan	20:00	MKS Banimex Będzin	0–3	Lotos Trefl Gdańsk	19–25	18–25	15–25			52–75	
10 Jan	17:00	Transfer Bydgoszcz	3–1	AZS Częstochowa	25–15	22–25	25–22	25–22		97–84	
10 Jan	17:00	Effector Kielce	1–3	BBTS Bielsko-Biała	25–22	17–25	21–25	37–39		100–111	
10 Jan	17:00	Cerrad Czarni Radom	1–3	Cuprum Lubin	21–25	25–23	23–25	28–30		97–103	
11 Jan	14:45	AZS Politechnika Warszawska	0–3	PGE Skra Bełchatów	18–25	22–25	17–25			57–75	
10 Jan	14:00	Indykpol AZS Olsztyn	3–2	Asseco Resovia	25–23	25–15	21–25	19–25	15–10	105–98	
9 Jan	18:00	ZAKSA Kędzierzyn-Koźle	1–3	Jastrzębski Węgiel	31–29	19–25	16–25	15–25		81–104	

=== 20th round ===
Date	Time		Score		Set 1	Set 2	Set 3	Set 4	Set 5	Total	Report
18 Jan	14:45	MKS Banimex Będzin	3–2	ZAKSA Kędzierzyn-Koźle	18–25	25–17	27–25	22–25	15–9	107–101	
17 Jan	17:00	Jastrzębski Węgiel	3–0	Indykpol AZS Olsztyn	25–20	25–20	25–21			75–61	
17 Jan	14:45	Asseco Resovia	3–1	AZS Politechnika Warszawska	25–15	21–25	25–19	25–14		96–73	
17 Jan	18:00	PGE Skra Bełchatów	3–0	Cerrad Czarni Radom	26–24	25–19	25–20			76–63	
19 Jan	18:00	Cuprum Lubin	3–1	Effector Kielce	27–29	25–20	25–20	25–19		102–88	
17 Jan	17:00	BBTS Bielsko-Biała	0–3	Transfer Bydgoszcz	23–25	15–25	23–25			61–75	
18 Jan	15:30	Lotos Trefl Gdańsk	0–3	AZS Częstochowa	18–25	16–25	23–25			57–75	

=== 21st round ===
Date	Time		Score		Set 1	Set 2	Set 3	Set 4	Set 5	Total	Report
23 Jan	18:00	AZS Częstochowa	3–2	MKS Banimex Będzin	25–21	24–26	23–25	25–21	15–12	112–105	
24 Jan	18:00	Lotos Trefl Gdańsk	2–3	BBTS Bielsko-Biała	28–26	22–25	10–25	25–23	11–15	96–114	
24 Jan	14:45	Transfer Bydgoszcz	3–1	Cuprum Lubin	25–17	13–25	25–14	25–19		88–75	
24 Jan	17:00	Effector Kielce	0–3	PGE Skra Bełchatów	28–30	18–25	20–25			66–80	
24 Jan	14:45	Asseco Resovia	3–2	Cerrad Czarni Radom	23–25	26–24	19–25	25–14	15–12	108–100	
25 Jan	17:00	Jastrzębski Węgiel	3–0	AZS Politechnika Warszawska	25–23	25–18	25–16			75–57	
24 Jan	17:00	Indykpol AZS Olsztyn	3–1	ZAKSA Kędzierzyn-Koźle	26–24	19–25	25–17	25–21		95–87	

=== 22nd round ===
Date	Time		Score		Set 1	Set 2	Set 3	Set 4	Set 5	Total	Report
2 Feb	18:00	MKS Banimex Będzin	3–0	Indykpol AZS Olsztyn	25–22	25–19	25–18			75–59	
31 Jan	17:00	AZS Politechnika Warszawska	1–3	ZAKSA Kędzierzyn-Koźle	23–25	25–21	15–25	21–25		84–96	
31 Jan	17:00	Cerrad Czarni Radom	3–0	Jastrzębski Węgiel	25–22	25–22	25–22			75–66	
31 Jan	16:00	Asseco Resovia	3–1	Effector Kielce	25–21	28–30	25–16	25–18		103–85	
31 Jan	18:00	PGE Skra Bełchatów	3–0	Transfer Bydgoszcz	25–16	25–16	25–15			75–47	
31 Jan	14:45	Cuprum Lubin	1–3	Lotos Trefl Gdańsk	18–25	23–25	25–23	20–25		86–98	
31 Jan	17:00	BBTS Bielsko-Biała	3–2	AZS Częstochowa	23–25	27–25	20–25	25–18	15–12	110–105	

=== 23rd round ===
Date	Time		Score		Set 1	Set 2	Set 3	Set 4	Set 5	Total	Report
4 Feb	18:00	BBTS Bielsko-Biała	3–0	MKS Banimex Będzin	25–19	25–23	25–22			75–64	
4 Feb	18:30	AZS Częstochowa	1–3	Cuprum Lubin	23–25	21–25	25–21	20–25		89–96	
4 Feb	20:30	Lotos Trefl Gdańsk	1–3	PGE Skra Bełchatów	25–18	25–27	19–25	22–25		91–95	
4 Feb	18:00	Transfer Bydgoszcz	1–3	Asseco Resovia	24–26	25–21	23–25	21–25		93–97	
4 Feb	18:00	Effector Kielce	0–3	Jastrzębski Węgiel	22–25	16–25	16–25			54–75	
4 Feb	18:00	Cerrad Czarni Radom	0–3	ZAKSA Kędzierzyn-Koźle	34–36	23–25	21–25			78–86	
4 Feb	19:00	AZS Politechnika Warszawska	0–3	Indykpol AZS Olsztyn	25–27	22–25	18–25			65–77	

=== 24th round ===
Date	Time		Score		Set 1	Set 2	Set 3	Set 4	Set 5	Total	Report
7 Feb	18:00	MKS Banimex Będzin	1–3	AZS Politechnika Warszawska	22–25	25–18	22–25	21–25		90–93	
9 Feb	18:00	Indykpol AZS Olsztyn	0–3	Cerrad Czarni Radom	22–25	21–25	18–25			61–75	
7 Feb	17:00	ZAKSA Kędzierzyn-Koźle	3–0	Effector Kielce	25–15	25–20	25–21			75–56	
7 Feb	17:00	Jastrzębski Węgiel	3–0	Transfer Bydgoszcz	27–25	25–23	25–23			77–71	
7 Feb	17:30	Asseco Resovia	3–1	Lotos Trefl Gdańsk	25–19	25–22	19–25	26–24		95–90	
7 Feb	15:00	PGE Skra Bełchatów	3–0	AZS Częstochowa	25–23	25–23	25–23			75–69	
7 Feb	15:00	Cuprum Lubin	3–0	BBTS Bielsko-Biała	25–21	25–21	25–21			75–63	

=== 25th round ===
Date	Time		Score		Set 1	Set 2	Set 3	Set 4	Set 5	Total	Report
14 Feb	18:00	Cuprum Lubin	3–2	MKS Banimex Będzin	27–29	25–15	25–14	22–25	15–12	114–95	
14 Feb	17:00	BBTS Bielsko-Biała	1–3	PGE Skra Bełchatów	20–25	17–25	25–20	22–25		84–95	
14 Feb	17:00	AZS Częstochowa	0–3	Asseco Resovia	23–25	21–25	23–25			67–75	
15 Feb	14:45	Lotos Trefl Gdańsk	3–1	Jastrzębski Węgiel	25–20	23–25	25–17	30–28		103–90	
13 Feb	18:00	Transfer Bydgoszcz	2–3	ZAKSA Kędzierzyn-Koźle	20–25	19–25	30–28	25–23	13–15	107–116	
15 Feb	17:00	Effector Kielce	3–2	Indykpol AZS Olsztyn	21–25	20–25	25–20	25–17	15–11	106–98	
13 Feb	17:00	Cerrad Czarni Radom	2–3	AZS Politechnika Warszawska	25–17	26–28	17–25	25–23	12–15	105–108	

=== 26th round ===
Date	Time		Score		Set 1	Set 2	Set 3	Set 4	Set 5	Total	Report
21 Feb	17:00	Effector Kielce	3–2	MKS Banimex Będzin	25–12	25–22	21–25	22–25	15–11	108–95	
22 Feb	17:00	Cerrad Czarni Radom	1–3	Transfer Bydgoszcz	25–17	22–25	23–25	21–25		91–92	
21 Feb	17:00	AZS Politechnika Warszawska	3–1	Lotos Trefl Gdańsk	22–25	26–24	25–22	30–28		103–99	
20 Feb	18:00	Indykpol AZS Olsztyn	3–2	AZS Częstochowa	22–25	24–26	25–17	25–22	15–12	111–102	
21 Feb	17:00	ZAKSA Kędzierzyn-Koźle	3–0	BBTS Bielsko-Biała	25–17	25–15	25–19			75–51	
21 Feb	17:00	Jastrzębski Węgiel	2–3	Cuprum Lubin	28–30	25–19	20–25	28–26	14–16	115–116	
21 Feb	14:45	Asseco Resovia	3–1	PGE Skra Bełchatów	23–25	37–35	25–23	25–15		110–98	

== Playoffs ==
Quarterfinals
1	Asseco Resovia	2
8	Cerrad Czarni Radom	0
5	Cuprum Lubin	1
4	Jastrzębski Węgiel	2
3	Lotos Trefl Gdańsk	2
6	Transfer Bydgoszcz	0
7	ZAKSA Kędzierzyn-Koźle	0
2	PGE Skra Bełchatów	2

Semifinals
1	Asseco Resovia	3
4	Jastrzębski Węgiel	0
3	Lotos Trefl Gdańsk	3
2	PGE Skra Bełchatów	1

Finals
1	Asseco Resovia	3
3	Lotos Trefl Gdańsk	0

=== 1st round ===
==== Quarterfinals: 1st–4th places ====
- (to 2 victories)

Date	Time		Score		Set 1	Set 2	Set 3	Set 4	Set 5	Total	Report
25 Feb	18:00	Cerrad Czarni Radom	2–3	Asseco Resovia	25–23	24–26	23–25	25–20	11–15	108–109	
28 Feb	17:00	Asseco Resovia	3–0	Cerrad Czarni Radom	25–13	25–16	25–21			75–50	

Date	Time		Score		Set 1	Set 2	Set 3	Set 4	Set 5	Total	Report
25 Feb	18:00	ZAKSA Kędzierzyn-Koźle	0–3	PGE Skra Bełchatów	23–25	10–25	22–25			55–75	
28 Feb	17:30	PGE Skra Bełchatów	3–0	ZAKSA Kędzierzyn-Koźle	25–18	25–20	27–25			77–63	

Date	Time		Score		Set 1	Set 2	Set 3	Set 4	Set 5	Total	Report
28 Feb	18:00	Transfer Bydgoszcz	1–3	Lotos Trefl Gdańsk	25–27	23–25	35–33	16–25		99–110	
3 Mar	20:30	Lotos Trefl Gdańsk	3–1	Transfer Bydgoszcz	25–22	20–25	25–18	25–16		95–81	

Date	Time		Score		Set 1	Set 2	Set 3	Set 4	Set 5	Total	Report
25 Feb	20:30	Cuprum Lubin	3–0	Jastrzębski Węgiel	28–26	25–22	25–22			78–70	
28 Feb	17:00	Jastrzębski Węgiel	3–1	Cuprum Lubin	19–25	30–28	25–17	25–20		99–90	
1 Mar	17:00	Jastrzębski Węgiel	3–2	Cuprum Lubin	25–12	20–25	25–23	20–25	15–11	105–96	

==== 5th–12th places ====
Date	Time		Score		Set 1	Set 2	Set 3	Set 4	Set 5	Total	Report
25 Feb	18:00	Indykpol AZS Olsztyn	3–2	AZS Politechnika Warszawska	23–25	25–23	14–25	25–18	18–16	105–107	
1 Mar	17:00	AZS Politechnika Warszawska	3–0	Indykpol AZS Olsztyn	25–15	25–11	25–18			75–44	

Date	Time		Score		Set 1	Set 2	Set 3	Set 4	Set 5	Total	Report
25 Feb	18:00	MKS Banimex Będzin	3–2	BBTS Bielsko-Biała	22–25	25–19	18–25	25–15	15–13	105–97	
1 Mar	15:00	BBTS Bielsko-Biała	0–3	MKS Banimex Będzin	21–25	19–25	13–25			53–75	

Date	Time		Score		Set 1	Set 2	Set 3	Set 4	Set 5	Total	Report
27 Feb	18:30	AZS Częstochowa	0–3	Effector Kielce	23–25	20–25	28–30			71–80	
3 Mar	18:00	Effector Kielce	3–0	AZS Częstochowa	25–17	25–19	25–11			75–47	

=== 2nd round ===
==== Semifinals: 1st–4th places ====
- (to 3 victories)

Date	Time		Score		Set 1	Set 2	Set 3	Set 4	Set 5	Total	Report
8 Mar	14:45	Asseco Resovia	3–1	Jastrzębski Węgiel	25–16	22–25	25–20	25–21		97–82	
17 Mar	20:30	Jastrzębski Węgiel	1–3	Asseco Resovia	34–32	18–25	16–25	22–25		90–107	
20 Mar	18:00	Asseco Resovia	3–1	Jastrzębski Węgiel	28–26	25–18	20–25	25–23		98–92	

Date	Time		Score		Set 1	Set 2	Set 3	Set 4	Set 5	Total	Report
7 Mar	14:45	PGE Skra Bełchatów	2–3	Lotos Trefl Gdańsk	25–22	30–32	25–21	22–25	10–15	112–115	
14 Mar	20:00	Lotos Trefl Gdańsk	1–3	PGE Skra Bełchatów	18–25	25–16	26–28	22–25		91–94	
18 Mar	20:30	PGE Skra Bełchatów	0–3	Lotos Trefl Gdańsk	21–25	21–25	19–25			61–75	
4 Apr	20:30	Lotos Trefl Gdańsk	3–2	PGE Skra Bełchatów	24–26	27–25	25–22	21–25	15–13	112–111	

==== Quarterfinals: 5th–12th places ====
- (to 2 victories)

Date	Time		Score		Set 1	Set 2	Set 3	Set 4	Set 5	Total	Report
8 Mar	17:00	AZS Politechnika Warszawska	1–3	Cerrad Czarni Radom	17–25	25–19	23–25	33–35		98–104	
13 Mar	18:00	Cerrad Czarni Radom	0–3	AZS Politechnika Warszawska	19–25	22–25	21–25			62–75	
Golden set		Cerrad Czarni Radom	10–15	AZS Politechnika Warszawska							

Date	Time		Score		Set 1	Set 2	Set 3	Set 4	Set 5	Total	Report
7 Mar	17:00	Indykpol AZS Olsztyn	3–2	ZAKSA Kędzierzyn-Koźle	21–25	25–22	25–20	22–25	15–12	108–104	
17 Mar	18:00	ZAKSA Kędzierzyn-Koźle	3–0	Indykpol AZS Olsztyn	25–17	25–19	25–14			75–50	

Date	Time		Score		Set 1	Set 2	Set 3	Set 4	Set 5	Total	Report
9 Mar	18:00	MKS Banimex Będzin	1–3	Transfer Bydgoszcz	14–25	22–25	25–18	14–25		75–93	
14 Mar	17:00	Transfer Bydgoszcz	3–1	MKS Banimex Będzin	25–22	21–25	25–21	25–16		96–84	

Date	Time		Score		Set 1	Set 2	Set 3	Set 4	Set 5	Total	Report
6 Mar	18:00	Effector Kielce	3–2	Cuprum Lubin	25–14	22–25	25–20	22–25	15–12	109–96	
13 Mar	18:00	Cuprum Lubin	3–0	Effector Kielce	27–25	25–22	25–20			77–67	

==== Semifinals: 5th–12th places ====
- (to 2 victories)

Date	Time		Score		Set 1	Set 2	Set 3	Set 4	Set 5	Total	Report
20 Mar	18:00	AZS Politechnika Warszawska	2–3	Transfer Bydgoszcz	25–21	21–25	29–27	21–25	12–15	108–113	
27 Mar	18:00	Transfer Bydgoszcz	3–0	AZS Politechnika Warszawska	25–18	25–21	25–21			75–60	

Date	Time		Score		Set 1	Set 2	Set 3	Set 4	Set 5	Total	Report
20 Mar	18:00	Cuprum Lubin	1–3	ZAKSA Kędzierzyn-Koźle	19–25	25–23	17–25	22–25		83–98	
1 Apr	18:00	ZAKSA Kędzierzyn-Koźle	3–0	Cuprum Lubin	25–21	25–19	25–20			75–60	

Date	Time		Score		Set 1	Set 2	Set 3	Set 4	Set 5	Total	Report
21 Mar	15:00	MKS Banimex Będzin	3–2	Cerrad Czarni Radom	26–24	25–19	23–25	20–25	15–11	109–104	
28 Mar	17:00	Cerrad Czarni Radom	3–1	MKS Banimex Będzin	21–25	25–17	25–15	25–20		96–77	

Date	Time		Score		Set 1	Set 2	Set 3	Set 4	Set 5	Total	Report
22 Mar	17:30	Effector Kielce	2–3	Indykpol AZS Olsztyn	21–25	25–23	25–19	19–25	11–15	101–107	
28 Mar	16:00	Indykpol AZS Olsztyn	3–1	Effector Kielce	25–23	25–21	22–25	25–20		97–89	

=== 3rd round ===
==== 13th place ====
- (to 2 victories)

Date	Time		Score		Set 1	Set 2	Set 3	Set 4	Set 5	Total	Report
13 Mar	18:30	AZS Częstochowa	1–3	BBTS Bielsko-Biała	18–25	25–18	19–25	23–25		85–93	
22 Mar	18:00	BBTS Bielsko-Biała	0–3	AZS Częstochowa	21–25	16–25	19–25			56–75	
Golden set		BBTS Bielsko-Biała	15–11	AZS Częstochowa							

==== 11th place ====
- (to 2 victories)

Date	Time		Score		Set 1	Set 2	Set 3	Set 4	Set 5	Total	Report
11 Apr	18:00	MKS Banimex Będzin	3–0	Effector Kielce	25–21	25–20	25–23			75–64	
16 Apr	18:00	Effector Kielce	1–3	MKS Banimex Będzin	18–25	28–26	19–25	24–26		89–102	

==== 9th place ====
- (to 2 victories)

Date	Time		Score		Set 1	Set 2	Set 3	Set 4	Set 5	Total	Report
11 Apr	17:00	Indykpol AZS Olsztyn	1–3	Cerrad Czarni Radom	19–25	22–25	25–23	25–27		91–100	
17 Apr	18:00	Cerrad Czarni Radom	3–0	Indykpol AZS Olsztyn	25–21	25–19	25–12			75–52	

==== 7th place ====
- (to 2 victories)

Date	Time		Score		Set 1	Set 2	Set 3	Set 4	Set 5	Total	Report
12 Apr	17:00	AZS Politechnika Warszawska	1–3	Cuprum Lubin	21–25	23–25	25–21	20–25		89–96	
17 Apr	18:00	Cuprum Lubin	3–1	AZS Politechnika Warszawska	25–15	23–25	25–20	25–22		98–82	

==== 5th place ====
- (to 2 victories)

Date	Time		Score		Set 1	Set 2	Set 3	Set 4	Set 5	Total	Report
11 Apr	17:00	ZAKSA Kędzierzyn-Koźle	3–1	Transfer Bydgoszcz	25–22	25–22	32–34	25–22		107–100	
17 Apr	18:00	Transfer Bydgoszcz	3–0	ZAKSA Kędzierzyn-Koźle	25–22	25–22	25–23			75–67	
Golden set		Transfer Bydgoszcz	15–12	ZAKSA Kędzierzyn-Koźle							

==== 3rd place ====
- (to 3 victories)

Date	Time		Score		Set 1	Set 2	Set 3	Set 4	Set 5	Total	Report
15 Apr	18:00	PGE Skra Bełchatów	3–1	Jastrzębski Węgiel	20–25	25–15	25–23	29–27		99–90	
25 Apr	14:45	Jastrzębski Węgiel	0–3	PGE Skra Bełchatów	21–25	20–25	20–25			61–75	
29 Apr	20:00	PGE Skra Bełchatów	2–3	Jastrzębski Węgiel	25–23	17–25	25–19	18–25	10–15	95–107	
3 May	20:00	Jastrzębski Węgiel	3–2	PGE Skra Bełchatów	25–20	21–25	26–24	22–25	15–12	109–106	
6 May	20:30	PGE Skra Bełchatów	3–1	Jastrzębski Węgiel	19–25	25–23	29–27	25–23		98–98	

==== Final ====
- (to 3 victories)

Date	Time		Score		Set 1	Set 2	Set 3	Set 4	Set 5	Total	Report
15 Apr	20:00	Asseco Resovia	3–0	Lotos Trefl Gdańsk	25–22	25–20	25–23			75–65	
24 Apr	18:00	Lotos Trefl Gdańsk	2–3	Asseco Resovia	25–19	19–25	21–25	25–23	13–15	103–107	
28 Apr	20:00	Asseco Resovia	3–1	Lotos Trefl Gdańsk	19–25	25–19	27–25	25–18		96–87	

== Final standings ==
Qualified for the 2015–16 CEV Champions League
Qualified for the 2015–16 CEV Cup

Rank	Team
1st place, gold medalist(s)	Asseco Resovia
2nd place, silver medalist(s)	Lotos Trefl Gdańsk
3rd place, bronze medalist(s)	PGE Skra Bełchatów
4	Jastrzębski Węgiel
5	Transfer Bydgoszcz
6	ZAKSA Kędzierzyn-Koźle
7	Cuprum Lubin
8	AZS Politechnika Warszawska
9	Cerrad Czarni Radom
10	Indykpol AZS Olsztyn
11	MKS Banimex Będzin
12	Effector Kielce
13	BBTS Bielsko-Biała
14	AZS Częstochowa

2015 Polish Champions

7th title

== Squads ==
Asseco Resovia
No.	Name	Date of birth	Height	Position
2	(United States) Paul Lotman	3 November 1985	2.00 m (6 ft 7 in)	outside hitter
3	(Poland) Michał Żurek	3 June 1988	1.81 m (5 ft 11 in)	libero
4	(Poland) Piotr Nowakowski	18 December 1987	2.05 m (6 ft 9 in)	middle blocker
5	(Czech Republic) Lukáš Ticháček	12 January 1982	1.93 m (6 ft 4 in)	setter
6	(Poland) Dawid Konarski	31 August 1989	1.98 m (6 ft 6 in)	opposite
7	(Poland) Aleh Akhrem	12 March 1983	1.94 m (6 ft 4 in)	outside hitter
8	(Serbia) Marko Ivović	22 December 1990	1.94 m (6 ft 4 in)	outside hitter
10	(Germany) Jochen Schöps	8 October 1983	2.00 m (6 ft 7 in)	opposite
11	(Poland) Fabian Drzyzga	3 January 1990	1.96 m (6 ft 5 in)	setter
12	(Poland) Łukasz Perłowski	3 April 1984	2.04 m (6 ft 8 in)	middle blocker
14	(Poland) Rafał Buszek	28 April 1987	1.96 m (6 ft 5 in)	outside hitter
15	(United States) Russell Holmes	1 July 1982	2.05 m (6 ft 9 in)	middle blocker
16	(Poland) Krzysztof Ignaczak	15 May 1978	1.88 m (6 ft 2 in)	libero
17	(Bulgaria) Nikolay Penchev	22 May 1992	1.96 m (6 ft 5 in)	outside hitter
18	(Poland) Dawid Dryja	21 July 1992	2.01 m (6 ft 7 in)	middle blocker
19	(Poland) Michał Kozłowski	16 February 1985	1.91 m (6 ft 3 in)	setter
Head coach:		(Poland) Andrzej Kowal		

AZS Częstochowa
No.	Name	Date of birth	Height	Position
1	(Belarus) Artur Udrys	18 October 1990	2.11 m (6 ft 11 in)	middle blocker
2	(Poland) Mariusz Marcyniak	5 March 1992	2.06 m (6 ft 9 in)	middle blocker
3	(Spain) Miguel Ángel De Amo	16 September 1985	1.85 m (6 ft 1 in)	setter
4	(Poland) Damian Zygmunt	4 June 1994	1.97 m (6 ft 6 in)	middle blocker
5	(Poland) Patryk Napiórkowski	13 December 1995	0 m (0 in)	opposite
6	(Poland) Rafał Szymura	29 August 1995	1.97 m (6 ft 6 in)	outside hitter
7	(Poland) Michał Kaczyński	6 February 1993	2.00 m (6 ft 7 in)	opposite
8	(Poland) Bartosz Janeczek	12 July 1987	1.98 m (6 ft 6 in)	opposite
9	(Poland) Jakub Macyra	22 July 1995	2.02 m (6 ft 8 in)	middle blocker
10	(France) Guillaume Samica	28 September 1981	1.97 m (6 ft 6 in)	outside hitter
11	(Poland) Mateusz Przybyła	12 April 1991	2.08 m (6 ft 10 in)	middle blocker
13	(Poland) Konrad Buczek	17 February 1994	1.90 m (6 ft 3 in)	setter
15	(Belarus) Maksim Khilko	21 February 1987	1.97 m (6 ft 6 in)	outside hitter
16	(Poland) Szymon Herman	30 April 1997	1.94 m (6 ft 4 in)	outside hitter
17	(Poland) Adrian Stańczak	17 February 1987	1.85 m (6 ft 1 in)	libero
18	(Poland) Paweł Pietkiewicz	1 January 1986	1.90 m (6 ft 3 in)	outside hitter
Head coach:		(Slovakia) Marek Kardoš → (Poland) Michał Bąkiewicz		

AZS Politechnika Warszawska
No.	Name	Date of birth	Height	Position
2	(Poland) Maciej Olenderek	16 October 1992	1.78 m (5 ft 10 in)	libero
3	(Poland) Patryk Strzeżek	19 November 1989	2.03 m (6 ft 8 in)	opposite
4	(Poland) Jakub Radomski	16 March 1988	2.03 m (6 ft 8 in)	outside hitter
5	(Poland) Piotr Lipiński	4 January 1979	1.95 m (6 ft 5 in)	setter
6	(Poland) Dominik Depowski	27 October 1995	2.00 m (6 ft 7 in)	outside hitter
7	(Poland) Bartłomiej Lemański	19 March 1996	2.16 m (7 ft 1 in)	middle blocker
8	(Poland) Waldemar Świrydowicz	18 December 1986	2.05 m (6 ft 9 in)	middle blocker
9	(Poland) Krzysztof Bieńkowski	19 June 1995	1.98 m (6 ft 6 in)	setter
10	(Poland) Michał Filip	31 August 1994	1.97 m (6 ft 6 in)	outside hitter
11	(Poland) Aleksander Śliwka	24 May 1995	1.98 m (6 ft 6 in)	outside hitter
12	(Poland) Artur Szalpuk	20 March 1995	2.01 m (6 ft 7 in)	outside hitter
15	(Poland) Szymon Gregorowicz	7 March 1994	1.83 m (6 ft 0 in)	libero
16	(Poland) Paweł Mikołajczak	20 June 1988	1.95 m (6 ft 5 in)	opposite
17	(Poland) Mateusz Sacharewicz	23 October 1989	1.98 m (6 ft 6 in)	middle blocker
18	(Poland) Bartłomiej Mordyl	21 January 1995	2.01 m (6 ft 7 in)	middle blocker
Head coach:		(Poland) Jakub Bednaruk		

BBTS Bielsko-Biała
No.	Name	Date of birth	Height	Position
1	(Poland) Dominik Miarka	1 February 1994	1.95 m (6 ft 5 in)	outside hitter
2	(Poland) Łukasz Polański	29 January 1989	2.05 m (6 ft 9 in)	middle blocker
3	(Poland) Michał Błoński	24 March 1987	1.87 m (6 ft 2 in)	outside hitter
4	(Poland) Wojciech Siek	10 May 1994	2.05 m (6 ft 9 in)	middle blocker
5	(Poland) Wojciech Ferens	5 April 1991	1.94 m (6 ft 4 in)	outside hitter
6	(Poland) Bartłomiej Neroj	22 November 1984	2.00 m (6 ft 7 in)	setter
7	(Poland) Grzegorz Pilarz	12 February 1980	1.88 m (6 ft 2 in)	setter
8	(Poland) Bartosz Bućko	6 January 1995	0 m (0 in)	opposite
9	(Argentina) José Luis González	27 December 1984	2.06 m (6 ft 9 in)	opposite
10	(Poland) Bartosz Buniak	8 October 1985	0 m (0 in)	middle blocker
11	(Poland) Wojciech Sobala	12 May 1988	2.07 m (6 ft 9 in)	middle blocker
12	(Poland) Michał Pacławski	17 February 1994	2.02 m (6 ft 8 in)	opposite
13	(Poland) Przemysław Czauderna	21 May 1992	1.83 m (6 ft 0 in)	libero
14	(Poland) Marcin Bachmatiuk	17 May 1992	2.05 m (6 ft 9 in)	middle blocker
16	(Ukraine) Serhiy Kapelus	22 October 1982	1.91 m (6 ft 3 in)	outside hitter
17	(Poland) Michał Dębiec	29 March 1984	1.83 m (6 ft 0 in)	libero
18	(Poland) Kamil Kwasowski	13 September 1990	1.97 m (6 ft 6 in)	outside hitter
Head coach:		(Poland) Piotr Gruszka		

Cerrad Czarni Radom
No.	Name	Date of birth	Height	Position
1	(Poland) Bartłomiej Bołądź	28 September 1994	2.04 m (6 ft 8 in)	opposite
2	(Poland) Michał Ostrowski	29 March 1990	2.03 m (6 ft 8 in)	middle blocker
3	(Belgium) Igor Grobelny	8 June 1993	1.94 m (6 ft 4 in)	outside hitter
4	(Poland) Daniel Pliński	10 December 1978	2.04 m (6 ft 8 in)	middle blocker
5	(Poland) Bartłomiej Grzechnik	8 February 1993	2.00 m (6 ft 7 in)	middle blocker
6	(Poland) Wojciech Żaliński	8 January 1988	1.96 m (6 ft 5 in)	outside hitter
7	(Poland) Jakub Wachnik	16 February 1993	2.02 m (6 ft 8 in)	outside hitter
8	(Germany) Dirk Westphal	31 January 1986	2.03 m (6 ft 8 in)	outside hitter
9	(Poland) Adam Kowalski	16 September 1994	1.80 m (5 ft 11 in)	libero
10	(Germany) Lukas Kampa	29 November 1986	1.93 m (6 ft 4 in)	setter
12	(United States) Jacek Ratajczak	24 November 1986	2.14 m (7 ft 0 in)	middle blocker
13	(Poland) Michał Kędzierski	9 August 1994	1.94 m (6 ft 4 in)	setter
14	(Poland) Kamil Gutkowski	15 October 1986	1.94 m (6 ft 4 in)	outside hitter
15	(Finland) Mikko Oivanen	26 May 1986	1.98 m (6 ft 6 in)	opposite
Head coach:		(Poland) Robert Prygiel		

Cuprum Lubin
No.	Name	Date of birth	Height	Position
1	(Poland) Łukasz Łapszyński	23 September 1993	1.94 m (6 ft 4 in)	outside hitter
3	(Serbia) Ivan Borovnjak	4 July 1988	2.02 m (6 ft 8 in)	outside hitter
4	(Netherlands) Jeroen Trommel	1 August 1980	1.94 m (6 ft 4 in)	outside hitter
5	(Poland) Adam Michalski	24 December 1988	2.01 m (6 ft 7 in)	middle blocker
6	(Poland) Paweł Rusek	21 January 1983	1.83 m (6 ft 0 in)	libero
7	(Poland) Maciej Gorzkiewicz	16 February 1984	1.92 m (6 ft 4 in)	setter
9	(Ukraine) Dmytro Pashytskyy	29 November 1987	2.05 m (6 ft 9 in)	middle blocker
10	(Poland) Marcel Gromadowski	19 December 1985	2.03 m (6 ft 8 in)	opposite
11	(Poland) Łukasz Kadziewicz	20 September 1980	2.06 m (6 ft 9 in)	middle blocker
13	(Poland) Szymon Romać	1 October 1992	1.96 m (6 ft 5 in)	opposite
14	(Poland) Paweł Siezieniewski	27 December 1981	1.99 m (6 ft 6 in)	outside hitter
17	(Poland) Marcin Kryś	15 January 1983	1.92 m (6 ft 4 in)	libero
18	(Poland) Grzegorz Łomacz	1 October 1987	1.88 m (6 ft 2 in)	setter
Head coach:		(Romania) Gheorghe Crețu		

Effector Kielce
No.	Name	Date of birth	Height	Position
1	(Poland) Sławomir Jungiewicz	21 June 1989	1.96 m (6 ft 5 in)	opposite
2	(Poland) Bartosz Sufa	11 August 1987	1.86 m (6 ft 1 in)	libero
3	(Poland) Mariusz Wacek	3 February 1995	2.00 m (6 ft 7 in)	middle blocker
4	(Poland) Bartosz Kaczmarek	17 January 1991	1.84 m (6 ft 0 in)	libero
5	(Lithuania) Arvydas Mišeikis	17 September 1987	2.00 m (6 ft 7 in)	opposite
6	(Poland) Jędrzej Maćkowiak	17 October 1992	0 m (0 in)	middle blocker
7	(Poland) Marcin Janusz	31 July 1994	1.95 m (6 ft 5 in)	setter
8	(Poland) Adrian Staszewski	31 May 1990	1.96 m (6 ft 5 in)	outside hitter
10	(Colombia) Humberto Machacón	5 October 1998	0 m (0 in)	outside hitter
11	(Norway) Andreas Takvam	4 June 1993	2.01 m (6 ft 7 in)	middle blocker
13	(Poland) Adrian Buchowski	30 September 1991	1.94 m (6 ft 4 in)	outside hitter
14	(Poland) Grzegorz Pająk	1 January 1987	1.96 m (6 ft 5 in)	setter
15	(Poland) Mateusz Bieniek	5 April 1994	2.08 m (6 ft 10 in)	middle blocker
16	(Bulgaria) Rozalin Penchev	11 December 1994	1.97 m (6 ft 6 in)	outside hitter
17	(Poland) Bartosz Krzysiek	19 February 1990	2.07 m (6 ft 9 in)	opposite
19	(Poland) Bartosz Dzierżyński	13 November 1996	1.85 m (6 ft 1 in)	libero
20	(Poland) Adam Sobota	29 February 1996	1.93 m (6 ft 4 in)	outside hitter
Head coach:		(Poland) Dariusz Daszkiewicz		

Indykpol AZS Olsztyn
No.	Name	Date of birth	Height	Position
1	(Poland) Maciej Dobrowolski	19 March 1977	1.90 m (6 ft 3 in)	setter
2	(Poland) Krzysztof Gulak	29 August 1996	1.96 m (6 ft 5 in)	outside hitter
5	(Poland) Jakub Bik	17 February 1992	1.83 m (6 ft 0 in)	libero
7	(Poland) Bartosz Bednorz	25 July 1994	2.01 m (6 ft 7 in)	outside hitter
8	(Poland) Miłosz Zniszczoł	2 July 1986	2.01 m (6 ft 7 in)	middle blocker
9	(Poland) Paweł Adamajtis	30 August 1990	1.99 m (6 ft 6 in)	opposite
10	(Poland) Grzegorz Szymański	12 July 1978	2.02 m (6 ft 8 in)	opposite
11	(Poland) Maciej Zajder	31 January 1988	0 m (0 in)	middle blocker
13	(Poland) Piotr Łuka	9 June 1980	0 m (0 in)	outside hitter
14	(Poland) Michał Potera	6 March 1988	1.83 m (6 ft 0 in)	libero
15	(Slovakia) Juraj Zaťko	5 June 1987	1.90 m (6 ft 3 in)	setter
16	(Poland) Piotr Hain	26 February 1991	2.07 m (6 ft 9 in)	middle blocker
17	(Slovakia) František Ogurčák	24 April 1984	1.98 m (6 ft 6 in)	outside hitter
18	(Brazil) Lévi Cabral	16 May 1989	1.98 m (6 ft 6 in)	outside hitter
Head coach:		(Poland) Krzysztof Stelmach → (Italy) Andrea Gardini		

Jastrzębski Węgiel
No.	Name	Date of birth	Height	Position
1	(Italy) Michał Łasko	11 March 1981	2.02 m (6 ft 8 in)	opposite
2	(Poland) Krzysztof Gierczyński	23 January 1976	1.93 m (6 ft 4 in)	outside hitter
3	(Poland) Jakub Popiwczak	17 April 1996	1.90 m (6 ft 3 in)	libero
4	(Germany) Denis Kaliberda	24 June 1990	1.93 m (6 ft 4 in)	outside hitter
5	(Slovenia) Alen Pajenk	23 April 1986	2.03 m (6 ft 8 in)	middle blocker
6	(Poland) Mateusz Malinowski	6 May 1992	1.98 m (6 ft 6 in)	opposite
7	(Slovakia) Michal Masný	14 August 1979	1.82 m (6 ft 0 in)	setter
8	(Poland) Mateusz Kańczok	3 June 1993	2.04 m (6 ft 8 in)	middle blocker
9	(Poland) Patryk Czarnowski	1 November 1985	2.04 m (6 ft 8 in)	middle blocker
10	(Poland) Grzegorz Kosok	2 March 1986	2.05 m (6 ft 9 in)	middle blocker
11	(Poland) Zbigniew Bartman	4 May 1987	1.98 m (6 ft 6 in)	outside hitter
12	(Poland) Konrad Formela	8 March 1995	1.94 m (6 ft 4 in)	outside hitter
14	(France) Guillaume Quesque	29 April 1989	2.03 m (6 ft 8 in)	outside hitter
15	(Greece) Dmytro Filippov	4 December 1990	1.98 m (6 ft 6 in)	setter
18	(Poland) Damian Wojtaszek	7 September 1988	1.80 m (5 ft 11 in)	libero
Head coach:		(Italy) Roberto Piazza		

Lotos Trefl Gdańsk
No.	Name	Date of birth	Height	Position
2	(Poland) Wojciech Grzyb	4 January 1981	2.05 m (6 ft 9 in)	middle blocker
3	(Poland) Piotr Gacek	16 September 1978	1.85 m (6 ft 1 in)	libero
4	(Poland) Przemysław Stępień	7 February 1994	1.85 m (6 ft 1 in)	setter
5	(Italy) Marco Falaschi	18 September 1987	1.87 m (6 ft 2 in)	setter
6	(Poland) Moustapha M'Baye	18 September 1992	1.98 m (6 ft 6 in)	middle blocker
7	(Poland) Damian Schulz	26 February 1990	2.08 m (6 ft 10 in)	opposite
9	(Germany) Sebastian Schwarz	2 October 1985	1.97 m (6 ft 6 in)	outside hitter
10	(Poland) Bartosz Gawryszewski	22 August 1985	2.02 m (6 ft 8 in)	middle blocker
11	(United States) Murphy Troy	31 May 1989	2.02 m (6 ft 8 in)	opposite
12	(Poland) Artur Ratajczak	18 September 1990	2.06 m (6 ft 9 in)	middle blocker
13	(Poland) Krzysztof Wierzbowski	18 July 1988	1.97 m (6 ft 6 in)	outside hitter
14	(Poland) Sławomir Stolc	23 January 1993	1.98 m (6 ft 6 in)	outside hitter
15	(Poland) Mateusz Mika	21 January 1991	2.06 m (6 ft 9 in)	outside hitter
18	(Poland) Mateusz Czunkiewicz	16 December 1996	1.83 m (6 ft 0 in)	libero
Head coach:		(Italy) Andrea Anastasi		

MKS Banimex Będzin
No.	Name	Date of birth	Height	Position
1	(Poland) Tomasz Kowalski	12 June 1991	2.02 m (6 ft 8 in)	setter
2	(Poland) Miłosz Hebda	11 March 1991	2.06 m (6 ft 9 in)	outside hitter
3	(Poland) Mikołaj Sarnecki	29 July 1987	0 m (0 in)	opposite
4	(Poland) Maciej Pawliński	2 February 1983	1.93 m (6 ft 4 in)	outside hitter
7	(Poland) Mariusz Gaca	20 January 1984	2.00 m (6 ft 7 in)	middle blocker
8	(Poland) Jakub Oczko	27 December 1981	1.93 m (6 ft 4 in)	setter
9	(Poland) Sebastian Warda	18 January 1989	2.04 m (6 ft 8 in)	middle blocker
10	(Poland) Adrian Hunek	28 October 1985	0 m (0 in)	middle blocker
13	(Poland) Michał Żuk	4 July 1985	1.96 m (6 ft 5 in)	outside hitter
14	(Poland) Grzegorz Wójtowicz	26 June 1989	1.90 m (6 ft 3 in)	outside hitter
16	(Poland) Marcin Mierzejewski	4 January 1982	0 m (0 in)	libero
17	(Poland) Tomasz Tomczyk	24 May 1986	0 m (0 in)	opposite
18	(Poland) Robert Milczarek	28 November 1983	1.88 m (6 ft 2 in)	libero
Head coach:		(Poland) Damian Dacewicz → (Italy) Roberto Santilli		

PGE Skra Bełchatów
No.	Name	Date of birth	Height	Position
1	(Serbia) Srećko Lisinac	17 May 1992	2.05 m (6 ft 9 in)	middle blocker
2	(Poland) Mariusz Wlazły	4 August 1983	1.94 m (6 ft 4 in)	opposite
6	(Poland) Karol Kłos	8 August 1989	2.01 m (6 ft 7 in)	middle blocker
7	(Argentina) Facundo Conte	25 August 1989	1.97 m (6 ft 6 in)	outside hitter
8	(Poland) Andrzej Wrona	27 December 1988	2.06 m (6 ft 9 in)	middle blocker
9	(Poland) Maciej Muzaj	21 May 1994	2.08 m (6 ft 10 in)	opposite
10	(Argentina) Nicolás Uriarte	21 March 1990	1.89 m (6 ft 2 in)	setter
11	(Poland) Piotr Badura	20 February 1995	2.06 m (6 ft 9 in)	middle blocker
12	(Poland) Wojciech Włodarczyk	28 October 1990	2.00 m (6 ft 7 in)	outside hitter
13	(Poland) Michał Winiarski	28 September 1983	2.00 m (6 ft 7 in)	outside hitter
15	(Serbia) Aleksa Brđović	29 July 1993	2.04 m (6 ft 8 in)	setter
16	(Poland) Kacper Piechocki	17 December 1995	1.85 m (6 ft 1 in)	libero
17	(Germany) Ferdinand Tille	8 December 1988	1.85 m (6 ft 1 in)	libero
18	(Poland) Nicolas Maréchal	4 March 1987	1.98 m (6 ft 6 in)	outside hitter
Head coach:		(Spain) Miguel Ángel Falasca		

Transfer Bydgoszcz
No.	Name	Date of birth	Height	Position
1	(Poland) Jan Nowakowski	17 May 1994	2.02 m (6 ft 8 in)	middle blocker
2	(Canada) Steven Marshall	23 November 1989	1.89 m (6 ft 2 in)	outside hitter
4	(Poland) Wojciech Jurkiewicz	21 June 1977	2.05 m (6 ft 9 in)	middle blocker
5	(Canada) Justin Duff	10 May 1989	2.02 m (6 ft 8 in)	middle blocker
6	(Poland) Jakub Jarosz	10 February 1987	1.97 m (6 ft 6 in)	opposite
7	(Poland) Marcin Waliński	24 October 1990	1.95 m (6 ft 5 in)	outside hitter
8	(Serbia) Konstantin Čupković	2 January 1987	2.05 m (6 ft 9 in)	outside hitter
9	(Poland) Łukasz Wiese	24 March 1993	1.95 m (6 ft 5 in)	outside hitter
10	(Poland) Dawid Murek	24 July 1977	1.95 m (6 ft 5 in)	outside hitter
12	(Poland) Paweł Woicki	19 June 1983	1.82 m (6 ft 0 in)	setter
14	(Poland) Dawid Gunia	1 January 1987	2.03 m (6 ft 8 in)	middle blocker
15	(Poland) Paweł Stysiał	30 January 1997	1.85 m (6 ft 1 in)	libero
16	(United States) Andrew John Nally	7 June 1988	1.97 m (6 ft 6 in)	outside hitter
17	(Poland) Nikodem Wolański	19 January 1994	1.98 m (6 ft 6 in)	setter
18	(Poland) Tomasz Bonisławski	22 January 1991	1.88 m (6 ft 2 in)	libero
Head coach:		(Belgium) Vital Heynen		

ZAKSA Kędzierzyn-Koźle
No.	Name	Date of birth	Height	Position
1	(Poland) Paweł Zatorski	21 June 1990	1.84 m (6 ft 0 in)	libero
2	(Netherlands) Nimir Abdel-Aziz	5 February 1992	2.01 m (6 ft 7 in)	setter
3	(Poland) Dominik Witczak	2 January 1983	1.98 m (6 ft 6 in)	opposite
4	(Poland) Krzysztof Rejno	22 February 1993	2.03 m (6 ft 8 in)	middle blocker
5	(Poland) Paweł Zagumny	18 October 1977	2.00 m (6 ft 7 in)	setter
6	(Poland) Krzysztof Zapłacki	8 August 1993	1.97 m (6 ft 6 in)	outside hitter
7	(Brazil) Lucas Lóh	18 January 1991	1.95 m (6 ft 5 in)	outside hitter
8	(Poland) Yuriy Gladyr	8 July 1984	2.02 m (6 ft 8 in)	middle blocker
9	(Poland) Łukasz Wiśniewski	3 February 1989	1.98 m (6 ft 6 in)	middle blocker
11	(Netherlands) Dick Kooy	3 December 1987	2.02 m (6 ft 8 in)	outside hitter
12	(Poland) Grzegorz Bociek	6 June 1991	2.07 m (6 ft 9 in)	opposite
14	(Poland) Paweł Gryc	9 January 1996	2.08 m (6 ft 10 in)	outside hitter
14	(Netherlands) Kay van Dijk	25 June 1984	2.14 m (7 ft 0 in)	opposite
16	(Poland) Michał Ruciak	22 August 1983	1.90 m (6 ft 3 in)	outside hitter
17	(Poland) Wojciech Kaźmierczak	11 June 1982	0 m (0 in)	middle blocker
Head coach:		(Poland) Sebastian Świderski		

== See also ==
- 2014–15 CEV Champions League
- 2014–15 CEV Cup
