= Wierzbowski =

Wierzbowski (feminine Wierzbowska) is a Polish surname. Notable people with the surname include:

- Anna Wierzbowska (born 1990), Polish rower
- Krzysztof Wierzbowski (born 1988), Polish volleyball player
- Marek Wierzbowski, Polish lawyer
- Maria Wierzbowska (born 1995), Polish rower
- Trevor Wierzbowski, character in James Cameron's 1986 film Aliens
