= Mariusz Marcyniak =

Polish volleyball player (born 1992)

Personal information
- Full name: Mariusz Marcyniak
- Nationality: Polish
- Born: March 5, 1992 (age 34); Chełm, Poland
- Height: 2.06 m (6 ft 9 in)
- Weight: 98 kg (216 lb)
- Spike: 344 cm (135 in)
- Block: 324 cm (128 in)

Volleyball information
- Position: Middle blocker
- Current club: CHKS Chełm
- Number: 7

Career
Years	Teams
2009–2011; 2011–2012; 2012–2015; 2015–2017; 2017–2018; 2018-2019; 2019-2020; 2020-2022; 2022-	Metro Warszawa; BBTS Bielsko-Biała; AZS Częstochowa; PGE Skra Bełchatów; Aluron Virtu Warta Zawiercie; Cuprum Lubin; VK Ostrava; BKS Wisła Bydgoszcz; Inpost ChKS Chełm
- Last updated: 5 June 2018

Mariusz Marcyniak (born 5 March 1992) is a Polish volleyball player, a member of Polish club Cuprum Lubin.

== Career ==
=== Clubs ===
In 2015 he went to PGE Skra Bełchatów. On February 7, 2016, he played with PGE Skra and won the 2016 Polish Cup after beating ZAKSA in the final. In April 2016 he was a member of the same team which won a bronze medal in the 2015–16 PlusLiga championship.

== Sporting achievements ==
=== Clubs ===
==== National championships ====
- 2015/2016 Polish Cup, with PGE Skra Bełchatów
- 2015/2016 Polish Championship, with PGE Skra Bełchatów
- 2016/2017 Polish Championship, with PGE Skra Bełchatów
