= Marek Wierzbowski =

Polish academic in law

Marek Jakub Wierzbowski (born February 23, 1946) is a Polish lawyer, legal advisor, professor of legal sciences, specialist in administrative law, academic teacher associated with the University of Warsaw, where he holds the Chair of Law and Administrative Law Proceedings.

In 1988 he was awarded the title of professor of legal sciences. He was the chairman of the board of the Warsaw Stock Exchange (1998–2002).
