= Łukasz Polański =

Polish volleyball player (born 1989)

Personal information
- Full name: Łukasz Polański
- Nationality: Polish
- Born: 29 January 1989 (age 37) Warsaw, Poland
- Height: 2.05 m (6 ft 9 in)
- Weight: 94 kg (207 lb)
- Spike: 352 cm (139 in)
- Block: 330 cm (130 in)

Volleyball information
- Position: Middle blocker
- Current team: AZS Częstochowa
- Number: 2

Career
- Years: Team
- 2005–2007 2007–2008 2008–2010 2010–2013 2013–2014 2014–2015 2015–: MKS MDK Warszawa; Legia Warszawa; Joker Piła; Jastrzębski Węgiel; Effector Kielce; BBTS Bielsko-Biała; AZS Częstochowa

National team
- Years: Team
- –: Poland
- Updated on 6 February 2017

Łukasz Polański (born 29 January 1989) is a Polish volleyball player, a member of Polish club AZS Częstochowa.

== Personal life ==
Łukasz Polański was born in Warsaw, Poland. In 2013, he married Gabriela (née Wojtowicz), who is also a volleyball player. On 2 December 2013 his wife gave birth to their son Jakub.

== Career ==
=== Clubs ===
In 2014 he signed a contract with BBTS Bielsko-Biała.

== Sporting achievements ==
=== Clubs ===
==== National championships ====
- 2012/2013 Polish Championship, with Jastrzębski Węgiel

=== National team ===
- 2007 CEV U19 European Championship
