= Mateusz Przybyła =

Polish volleyball player (born 1991)

Personal information
- Nationality: (Poland) Polish
- Born: 12 April 1991 (age 35)
- Height: 6 ft 10 in (2.08 m)
- Weight: 260 lb (118 kg)
- Spike: 139 in (354 cm)
- Block: 131 in (334 cm)

Volleyball information
- Position: Middle blocker

Career
Years	Teams
2007–2011; 2011–2012; 2012–2013; 2013–2014; 2014–2015; 2015–2016; 2016–2018	(Poland) Jastrzębski Węgiel (Poland) Joker Piła (Poland) MKS Będzin (Poland) KPS Siedlce (Poland) AZS Częstochowa (Belgium) Topvolley Antwerpen (Poland) MKS Będzin

Mateusz Przybyła (born 12 April 1991) is a Polish volleyball player, playing in position middle blocker.
