= Felipe Airton Banderò =

Brazilian volleyball player (born 1988)

Personal information
- Nationality: (Brazil) Brazilian
- Born: 1988 (age 37–38)
- Height: 2.04 m (6 ft 8 in)
- Weight: 110 kg (243 lb)

Volleyball information
- Position: Opposite
- Current club: Benfica Lisboa Portugal
- Number: 13

Career
Years	Teams
2017–2018; 2018–2019; 2019–2020; 2020–2021; 2021–2022; 2021–	(South Korea) Suwon KEPCO Vixtorm (South Korea) Uijeongbu KB Insurance Stars (South Korea) Seoul Woori Card Wibee (South Korea) Ansan OKman; Al-Arabi SC (Qatar) (South Korea) Cheonan Hyundai Skywalkers

Felipe Airton Banderò (born 1988) is a Brazilian volleyball player who has played in Brazil, Europe, the Middle East and South Korea.

He currently plays for Cheonan Hyundai Skywalkers in the Korean V-League. Where he has had the unusual distinction of having played for five different teams in the last five seasons.
