= Kacper Stelmach =

Polish volleyball player (born 1997)

Personal information
- Full name: Kacper Stelmach
- Nationality: Polish
- Born: May 5, 1997 (age 29); Poland
- Height: 2.02 m (6 ft 8 in)
- Weight: 87 kg (192 lb)
- Spike: 345 cm (136 in)
- Block: 0 cm (0 in)

Volleyball information
- Position: Outside hitter
- Current club: GKS Katowice
- Number: 15

Career
Years	Teams
2013–2016; 2015–2016; 2016–	SMS PZPS Spała; AZS Częstochowa; GKS Katowice
- Last updated: 14 April 2017

Kacper Stelmach (born 5 May 1997) is a Polish volleyball player, a member of Polish club GKS Katowice.

== Personal life ==
His father Andrzej is former Olympic volleyball player, six time Polish Champion. Also his uncle Krzysztof is former Olympic volleyball player, long-time member of Polish national team. He is studying economic analytics at University of Economics in Katowice.

== Career ==
His debuted in PlusLiga in 2015 as AZS Częstochowa player. He didn't have many chance to play in main squad so he decided to move to GKS Katowice.
