= Wojciech Sobala =

Polish volleyball player (born 1988)

Personal information
- Nationality: Polish
- Born: 12 May 1988 (age 38) Sosnowiec, Poland
- Height: 2.07 m (6 ft 9 in)
- Weight: 96 kg (212 lb)
- Spike: 355 cm (140 in)

Volleyball information
- Position: Middle blocker
- Current club: Steaua București
- Number: 11

Career
- Years: Team
- 2007–2008 2008–2009 2009–2010 2010–2012 2012–2014 2014–2015 2015–2018 2018–2019 2020 2020–2022 2022–: Joker Piła; Siatkarz Wieluń; Jastrzębski Węgiel; AZS Częstochowa; AZS Olsztyn; BBTS Bielsko-Biała; Jastrzębski Węgiel; GKS Katowice; Narbonne Volley; LUK Lublin; Steaua București

Wojciech Sobala (born 12 May 1988) is a Polish volleyball player. At the professional club level, he plays for Steaua București.

== Honours ==
=== Club ===
- CEV Challenge Cup
  - 2011–12 – with AZS Częstochowa
- National championships
  - 2009–10 Polish Cup, with Jastrzębski Węgiel
