= Piotr Lipiński =

Polish volleyball player (born 1979)

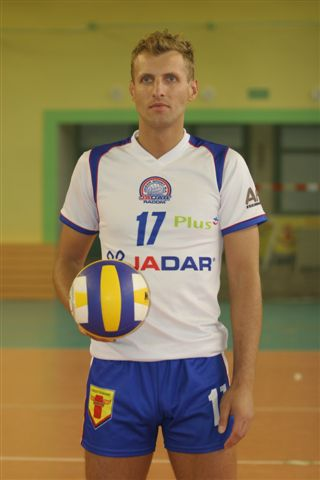

Personal information
- Full name: Piotr Lipiński
- Nationality: (Poland) Polish
- Born: January 4, 1979 (age 47); Olsztyn, Poland
- Height: 1.95 m (6 ft 5 in)
- Weight: 85 kg (187 lb)
- Spike: 335 cm (132 in)

Volleyball information
- Position: Setter

Career
Years	Teams
1995–1998; 1998–1999; 1999–2005; 2005–2007; 2007–2008; 2008–2013; 2013–2014; 2014–2015; 2015; 2016; 2016–2017; 2017–2018; 2018–2019; 2019–2020; 2020	(Poland) AZS Olsztyn (Poland) SMS Rzeszów (Poland) AZS Olsztyn (Poland) Mostostal Kędzierzyn-Koźle (Poland) AZS Olsztyn (Poland) Jadar Radom (Poland) Delecta Bydgoszcz (Poland) Effector Kielce (Poland) AZS Politechnika Warszawska (Poland) MKS Będzin (Poland) Victoria Wałbrzych (Poland) Ślepsk Suwałki (Poland) Victoria Wałbrzych (Poland) Krispol Września (Poland) BKS Visła Bydgoszcz (Poland) Aluron Virtu CMC Zawiercie

National team
2001–2003	Poland (38)

Piotr Lipiński (born 4 January 1979) is a Polish volleyball player, a member of Polish national team in 2001–2003, four-time Polish Champion.

== Career ==
=== Clubs ===
He began to play when he was 10. His first coach was Maciej Rejzner. When he was 15 he debuted in AZS Olsztyn. After that, he went to Mostostal SA Kędzierzyn-Koźle. In season 2013/2014 he played for Effector Kielce. In 2014 he went to AZS Politechnika Warszawska.

== Sporting achievements ==
- CEV Champions League
  - 2002/2003 – with Mostostal SA Kędzierzyn-Koźle
- CEV Challenge Cup
  - 1999/2000 – with Mostostal SA Kędzierzyn-Koźle
- National championships
  - 1999/2000 Polish Cup, with Mostostal SA Kędzierzyn-Koźle
  - 1999/2000 Polish Championship, with Mostostal SA Kędzierzyn-Koźle
  - 2000/2001 Polish Cup, with Mostostal SA Kędzierzyn-Koźle
  - 2000/2001 Polish Championship, with Mostostal SA Kędzierzyn-Koźle
  - 2001/2002 Polish Cup, with Mostostal SA Kędzierzyn-Koźle
  - 2001/2002 Polish Championship, with Mostostal SA Kędzierzyn-Koźle
  - 2002/2003 Polish Championship, with Mostostal SA Kędzierzyn-Koźle
  - 2005/2006 Polish Championship, with AZS Olsztyn
  - 2006/2007 Polish Championship, with AZS Olsztyn
