= Radosław Gil =

Polish volleyball player (born 1997)

Personal information
- Full name: Radosław Gil
- Nationality: (Poland) Polish
- Born: January 25, 1997 (age 29); Katowice, Poland
- Hometown: Kozy, Poland
- Height: 1.91 m (6 ft 3 in)
- Weight: 82 kg (181 lb)
- Spike: 332 cm (131 in)

Volleyball information
- Position: Setter

Career
Years	Teams
2015–2017; 2017–2018; 2018–2019; 2019–2020; 2020–	(Poland) Jastrzębski Węgiel (Slovenia) Calcit Kamnik (Poland) Indykpol AZS Olsztyn (Poland) BKS Visła Bydgoszcz

National team
Poland U21

Radosław Gil (born 25 January 1997) is a Polish volleyball player.

== Career ==
=== Clubs ===
He was a player in Jastrzębski Węgiel youth team, he joined senior team of this club in 2015. In 2017 he moved to Slovenian club Calcit Kamnik.

=== National team ===
On July 2, 2017 Poland U21, including Gil, won the 2017 U21 World Championship after beating Cuba U21 in the final (3–0). His national team won 47 matches in the row and never lost.

== Sporting achievements ==
- National championships
  - 2016/2017 Polish Championship, with Jastrzębski Węgiel
  - 2017/2018 Slovenian Championship, with Calcit Kamnik
- National team
  - 2017 FIVB U21 World Championship
