= Adam Michalski =

Polish volleyball player

Personal information
- Nationality: (Poland) Polish
- Born: 24 December 1988 (age 37)
- Height: 6 ft 7 in (2.01 m)
- Weight: 205 lb (93 kg)
- Spike: 140 in (350 cm)

Volleyball information
- Position: Middle blocker
- Current club: SPS Chrobry Głogów

Career
Years	Teams
2002–2005; 2005–2009; 2009–2011; 2011–2012; 2012–2018; 2018–	(Poland) GKS Katowice (Poland) Energetyk Jaworzno (Poland) Avia Świdnik (Poland) Energetyk Jaworzno (Poland) Cuprum Lubin (Poland) SPS Chrobry Głogów

Adam Michalski (born 24 December 1988) is a Polish volleyball player, playing in position middle blocker. Since the 2018/2019 season, he has played for SPS Chrobry Głogów.
