= Adrian Stańczak =

Polish volleyball player (born 1987)

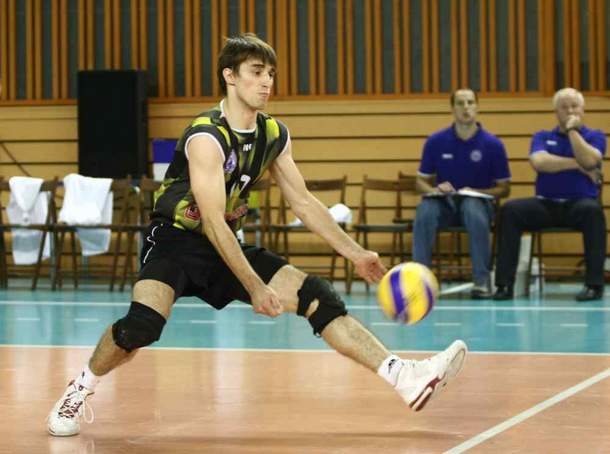

Personal information
- Full name: Adrian Stańczak
- Nationality: (Poland) Polish
- Born: 17 February 1987 (age 39); Radom, Poland
- Height: 1.85 m (6 ft 1 in)
- Weight: 83 kg (183 lb)

Volleyball information
- Position: Libero

Career
Years	Teams
2002–2003; 2003–2005; 2005–2008; 2008–2010; 2011–2012; 2012–2013; 2013–2014; 2014–2016; 2016–2018; 2019–2020	(Poland) Czarni Radom (Poland) Metro Warszawa (Poland) Płomień Sosnowiec (Poland) Jadar Radom (Poland) AZS Częstochowa (Czech Republic) Volejbal Brno (Poland) KS Camper Wyszków (Poland) AZS Częstochowa (Poland) GKS Katowice (Poland) Ślepsk Suwałki

National team
Poland

Adrian Stańczak (born 17 February 1987) is a Polish volleyball player.

== Career ==
=== Clubs ===
In 2012 AZS Częstochowa, including Stańczak, won CEV Challenge Cup after final with AZS Politechnika Warszawska (3-2). In 2016 he moved to GKS Katowice.

== Sporting achievements ==
- CEV Challenge Cup
  - 2011/2012 – with AZS Czestochowa
- National team
  - 2005 CEV U19 European Championship

=== Individually ===
- 2005: CEV U19 European Championship – Best Libero
