= Paweł Adamajtis =

Polish volleyball player (born 1990)

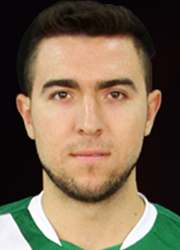

Personal information
- Nationality: Polish
- Born: 30 August 1990 (age 36)
- Height: 6 ft 6 in (1.98 m)
- Weight: 201 lb (91 kg)
- Spike: 140 in (360 cm)
- Block: 130 in (340 cm)

Volleyball information
- Position: Opposite

Career
Years	Teams
2009–2012; 2012–2014; 2014–2016; 2016–2017; 2017; 2017; 2017–2018; 2018	(Poland) MCKiS Jaworzno (Poland) AZS Politechnika Warszawska (Poland) Indykpol AZS Olsztyn (Poland) AZS Częstochowa (Italy) Power Volley Milano (Qatar) Al Shamal (Romania) Volei Municipal Zalău (Italy) Olimpia Bergamo

Paweł Adamajtis (born 30 August 1990) is a Polish volleyball player. He plays the opposite position.
