= Waldemar Świrydowicz =

Polish volleyball player (born 1986)

Personal information
- Full name: Waldemar Świrydowicz
- Nationality: Polish
- Born: December 18, 1986 (age 39) Suwałki, Poland
- Height: 2.05 m (6 ft 9 in)
- Weight: 100 kg (220 lb)
- Spike: 345 cm (136 in)
- Block: 325 cm (128 in)

Volleyball information
- Position: Middle blocker
- Number: 12

Career
- Years: Team
- 2001–2004 2004–2005 2005–2012 2012–2014 2014–2017: MOS Wola Warszawa; SKS Hajnówka; Lotos Trefl Gdańsk; KS Camper Wyszków; AZS Politechnika Warszawska
- Updated on 5 August 2017

Waldemar Świrydowicz (born 18 December 1986) is a Polish volleyball player.

== Career ==
=== Clubs ===
He came back to PlusLiga in 2014, when he signed one-year contract with AZS Politechnika Warszawska. He extended contract in 2016.
