= Krzysztof Wierzbowski =

Polish volleyball player (born 1988)

Personal information
- Nationality: Polish
- Born: 18 July 1988 (age 38); Warsaw, Poland
- Height: 1.97 m (6 ft 6 in)
- Weight: 85 kg (187 lb)
- Spike: 340 cm (130 in)
- Block: 325 cm (128 in)

Volleyball information
- Position: Outside hitter

Career
Years	Teams
1999–2007; 2006–2007; 2007–2010; 2010–2013; 2013–2015; 2015; 2016	Metro Warsaw; Legia Warsaw; AZS Częstochowa; AZS Politechnika Warszawska; Lotos Trefl Gdańsk; Effector Kielce; AZS Politechnika Warszawska
- Last updated: 6 February 2017

Krzysztof Wierzbowski (born 18 July 1988) is a Polish volleyball player.

== Career ==
=== Clubs ===
He went to Lotos Trefl Gdańsk in June 2013. He signed a two-year contract. On 19 April 2015 Lotos Trefl Gdańsk, including him, achieved the Polish Cup 2015. Then he won silver medal of the Polish Championship. After two seasons he left Lotos Trefl Gdańsk in May 2015.

=== National team ===
He won a silver medal at the Universiade 2013.

== Sporting achievements ==
=== Clubs ===
==== CEV Challenge Cup ====
- 2011–12 – with AZS Politechnika Warszawska

==== National championships ====
- 2007–08 Polish Cup, with AZS Częstochowa
- 2007–08 Polish Championship, with AZS Częstochowa
- 2014–15 Polish Cup, with Lotos Trefl Gdańsk
- 2014–15 Polish Championship, with Lotos Trefl Gdańsk
