= BBTS Bielsko-Biała =

Polish volleyball club

- Full name: Bielsko–Bialskie Towarzystwo Sportowe Spółka Akcyjna
- Short name: BBTS
- Founded: 1999
- Ground: Hala pod Dębowcem ul. Karbowa 26; 43–300 Bielsko-Biała (Capacity: 3,009)
- Chairman: Ida Szostakowska
- Manager: Serhiy Kapelus
- League: Tauron 1. Liga
- Website: Club home page

Uniforms
Home	Away

BBTS Bielsko-Biała SA is a professional men's volleyball club based in Bielsko-Biała in southern Poland, founded in 1999.

== Honours ==
- Polish Cup

Winners (1): 1993–94

== Team ==
As of 2022–23 season

=== Coaching staff ===
Occupation	Name
Head coach	(Ukraine) Serhiy Kapelus

=== Players ===
No.	Name	Date of birth	Position
2	(Poland) Dawid Woch	16 May 1997 (age 27)	middle blocker
4	(Poland) Wojciech Siek	10 May 1994 (age 30)	middle blocker
6	(Poland) Mateusz Zawalski	7 February 1995 (age 30)	middle blocker
7	(Poland) Radosław Gil	25 January 1997 (age 28)	setter
8	(Hungary) Roland Gergye	24 February 1993 (age 32)	outside hitter
9	(Poland) Jakub Urbanowicz	14 August 1993 (age 31)	outside hitter
10	(Poland) Adrian Hunek	28 October 1985 (age 39)	middle blocker
11	(Poland) Bartosz Fijałek	August 30, 2003 (age 21)	libero
12	(Canada) Daulton Sinoski	7 April 1997 (age 27)	opposite
13	(Poland) Radosław Puczkowski	2 January 2003 (age 22)	outside hitter
17	(Germany) Jan Zimmermann	12 February 1993 (age 32)	setter
19	(Serbia) Konstantin Čupković	2 January 1987 (age 38)	outside hitter
20	(Poland) Dominik Teklak	17 March 2000 (age 25)	libero
21	(Poland) Konrad Formela	8 March 1995 (age 30)	outside hitter
22	(United States) Jake Hanes	3 May 1998 (age 26)	opposite
25	(Romania) Ovidiu Darlaczi	1 February 1999 (age 26)	outside hitter
33	(France) Pierre Pujol	13 July 1984 (age 40)	setter

== See also ==
- BBTS Bielsko-Biała players
- BBTS Bielsko-Biała coaches
