= Trefl Gdańsk squads =

This article shows the previous rosters of Trefl Gdańsk volleyball team at PlusLiga in Poland.

== 2020/2021 ==
The following is the Trefl Gdańsk roster in the 2020–21 PlusLiga.

Head coach:	(Poland) Michał Winiarski
Assistant:	(Italy) Roberto Rotari

No.	Name	Date of birth	Height	Weight	Spike	Position
1	(Poland) Bartłomiej Lipiński	16 November 1996	2.01 m (6 ft 7 in)	105 kg (231 lb)	349 cm (137 in)	outside hitter
2	(Poland) Mariusz Wlazły (C)	4 August 1983	1.94 m (6 ft 4 in)	80 kg (180 lb)	365 cm (144 in)	opposite
4	(Poland) Łukasz Kozub	3 November 1997	1.86 m (6 ft 1 in)	88 kg (194 lb)	320 cm (130 in)	setter
5	(Poland) Marcin Janusz	31 July 1994	1.91 m (6 ft 3 in)	81 kg (179 lb)	326 cm (128 in)	setter
9	(Poland) Kewin Sasak	20 February 1997	2.08 m (6 ft 10 in)	95 kg (209 lb)	360 cm (140 in)	opposite
10	(Germany) Moritz Reichert	15 March 1995	1.95 m (6 ft 5 in)	90 kg (200 lb)	355 cm (140 in)	outside hitter
11	(Poland) Mateusz Janikowski	5 May 1999	2.01 m (6 ft 7 in)	92 kg (203 lb)	350 cm (140 in)	outside hitter
12	(Poland) Karol Urbanowicz	24 February 2001	2.00 m (6 ft 7 in)	89 kg (196 lb)	360 cm (140 in)	middle blocker
14	(Poland) Maciej Olenderek	16 October 1992	1.78 m (5 ft 10 in)	0 kg (0 lb)	80 cm (31 in)	libero
15	(Poland) Mateusz Mika	21 January 1991	2.06 m (6 ft 9 in)	91 kg (201 lb)	352 cm (139 in)	outside hitter
16	(Poland) Fabian Majcherski	28 March 1997	1.75 m (5 ft 9 in)	74 kg (163 lb)	0 cm (0 in)	libero
17	(Poland) Bartłomiej Mordyl	21 January 1995	2.01 m (6 ft 7 in)	85 kg (187 lb)	340 cm (130 in)	middle blocker
18	(Argentina) Pablo Crer	12 June 1989	2.05 m (6 ft 9 in)	82 kg (181 lb)	350 cm (140 in)	middle blocker
19	(Poland) Seweryn Lipiński	1 January 2001	0 m (0 in)	0 kg (0 lb)	0 cm (0 in)	middle blocker

== 2019/2020 ==
The following is the Trefl Gdańsk roster in the 2019–20 PlusLiga.

Head coach:	(Poland) Michał Winiarski
Assistant:	(Italy) Roberto Rotari

No.	Name	Date of birth	Height	Weight	Spike	Position
1	(Poland) Bartosz Filipiak	February 27, 1994	1.97 m (6 ft 6 in)	82 kg (181 lb)	355 cm (140 in)	opposite
4	(Poland) Łukasz Kozub	November 3, 1997	1.86 m (6 ft 1 in)	88 kg (194 lb)	320 cm (130 in)	setter
5	(Poland) Marcin Janusz	July 31, 1994	1.91 m (6 ft 3 in)	81 kg (179 lb)	326 cm (128 in)	setter
6	(Poland) Szymon Jakubiszak	February 13, 1998	2.08 m (6 ft 10 in)	98 kg (216 lb)	370 cm (150 in)	outside hitter
9	(Poland) Kewin Sasak	February 20, 1997	2.08 m (6 ft 10 in)	95 kg (209 lb)	360 cm (140 in)	opposite
11	(Poland) Mateusz Janikowski	May 5, 1999	2.01 m (6 ft 7 in)	92 kg (203 lb)	350 cm (140 in)	outside hitter
12	(Poland) Karol Urbanowicz	February 24, 2001	2.00 m (6 ft 7 in)	89 kg (196 lb)	360 cm (140 in)	middle blocker
13	(Germany) Ruben Schott	July 8, 1994	1.92 m (6 ft 4 in)	87 kg (192 lb)	340 cm (130 in)	outside hitter
14	(Poland) Maciej Olenderek	October 16, 1992	1.78 m (5 ft 10 in)	80 kg (180 lb)	0 cm (0 in)	libero
15	(Poland) Paweł Halaba	December 14, 1995	1.94 m (6 ft 4 in)	87 kg (192 lb)	354 cm (139 in)	outside hitter
16	(Poland) Fabian Majcherski	March 28, 1997	1.75 m (5 ft 9 in)	74 kg (163 lb)	0 cm (0 in)	libero
17	(Poland) Bartłomiej Mordyl	January 21, 1995	2.01 m (6 ft 7 in)	85 kg (187 lb)	340 cm (130 in)	middle blocker
18	(Argentina) Pablo Crer	June 12, 1989	2.05 m (6 ft 9 in)	82 kg (181 lb)	350 cm (140 in)	middle blocker
20	(Poland) Wojciech Grzyb (C)	January 4, 1981	2.05 m (6 ft 9 in)	105 kg (231 lb)	355 cm (140 in)	middle blocker

== 2018/2019 ==
The following is the Trefl Gdańsk roster in the 2018–19 PlusLiga.

Head coach:	(Italy) Andrea Anastasi
Assistants:	(Poland) Karol Rędzioch, (Poland) Piotr Graban

No.	Name	Date of birth	Height	Weight	Spike	Position
1	(Poland) Piotr Nowakowski	18 December 1987	2.05 m (6 ft 9 in)	101 kg (223 lb)	360 cm (140 in)	middle blocker
2	(Poland) Wojciech Grzyb (C)	4 January 1981	2.05 m (6 ft 9 in)	105 kg (231 lb)	355 cm (140 in)	middle blocker
5	(Poland) Marcin Janusz	31 July 1994	1.91 m (6 ft 3 in)	81 kg (179 lb)	326 cm (128 in)	setter
6	(Poland) Szymon Jakubiszak	13 February 1998	2.08 m (6 ft 10 in)	98 kg (216 lb)	370 cm (150 in)	outside hitter
7	(Poland) Miłosz Hebda	11 March 1991	2.06 m (6 ft 9 in)	89 kg (196 lb)	350 cm (140 in)	outside hitter
9	(Poland) Patryk Niemiec	18 February 1997	2.02 m (6 ft 8 in)	89 kg (196 lb)	353 cm (139 in)	middle blocker
10	(Serbia) Nikola Mijailović	8 August 1989	1.91 m (6 ft 3 in)	85 kg (187 lb)	345 cm (136 in)	outside hitter
12	(Poland) Maciej Muzaj	21 May 1994	2.08 m (6 ft 10 in)	88 kg (194 lb)	379 cm (149 in)	opposite
13	(Germany) Ruben Schott	8 July 1994	1.92 m (6 ft 4 in)	87 kg (192 lb)	340 cm (130 in)	outside hitter
14	(Poland) Maciej Olenderek	16 October 1992	1.78 m (5 ft 10 in)	80 kg (180 lb)	0 cm (0 in)	libero
16	(Poland) Fabian Majcherski	28 March 1997	1.75 m (5 ft 9 in)	74 kg (163 lb)	0 cm (0 in)	libero
17	(Poland) Bartłomiej Mordyl	21 January 1995	2.01 m (6 ft 7 in)	85 kg (187 lb)	340 cm (130 in)	middle blocker
18	(Poland) Michał Kozłowski	16 February 1985	1.91 m (6 ft 3 in)	87 kg (192 lb)	332 cm (131 in)	setter
20	(Poland) Kewin Sasak	20 February 1997	2.08 m (6 ft 10 in)	95 kg (209 lb)	360 cm (140 in)	opposite

== 2017/2018 ==
The following is the Trefl Gdańsk roster in the 2017–18 PlusLiga.

Head coach:	(Italy) Andrea Anastasi
Assistant:	(Slovenia) Bogdan Kotnik

No.	Name	Date of birth	Height	Weight	Spike	Position
1	(Poland) Piotr Nowakowski	18 December 1987	2.05 m (6 ft 9 in)	101 kg (223 lb)	360 cm (140 in)	middle blocker
2	(Poland) Wojciech Grzyb	4 January 1981	2.05 m (6 ft 9 in)	105 kg (231 lb)	355 cm (140 in)	middle blocker
3	(Canada) Tyler Sanders	14 December 1991	1.91 m (6 ft 3 in)	81 kg (179 lb)	326 cm (128 in)	setter
5	(Poland) Wojciech Ferens	5 April 1991	1.94 m (6 ft 4 in)	96 kg (212 lb)	358 cm (141 in)	outside hitter
6	(Poland) Szymon Jakubiszak	13 February 1998	2.08 m (6 ft 10 in)	98 kg (216 lb)	370 cm (150 in)	outside hitter
7	(Poland) Damian Schulz	26 February 1990	2.08 m (6 ft 10 in)	95 kg (209 lb)	355 cm (140 in)	opposite
9	(Poland) Patryk Niemiec	18 February 1997	2.02 m (6 ft 8 in)	89 kg (196 lb)	353 cm (139 in)	middle blocker
10	(United States) Daniel McDonnell	15 September 1988	2.00 m (6 ft 7 in)	94 kg (207 lb)	355 cm (140 in)	middle blocker
11	(Poland) Jan Tomczak	5 September 1995	1.88 m (6 ft 2 in)	80 kg (180 lb)	330 cm (130 in)	setter
12	(Poland) Artur Szalpuk	20 March 1995	2.01 m (6 ft 7 in)	93 kg (205 lb)	350 cm (140 in)	outside hitter
14	(Poland) Maciej Olenderek	16 October 1992	1.78 m (5 ft 10 in)	80 kg (180 lb)	0 cm (0 in)	libero
15	(Poland) Mateusz Mika (C)	21 January 1991	2.06 m (6 ft 9 in)	91 kg (201 lb)	352 cm (139 in)	outside hitter
16	(Poland) Fabian Majcherski	28 March 1997	1.75 m (5 ft 9 in)	74 kg (163 lb)	0 cm (0 in)	libero
18	(Poland) Michał Kozłowski	16 February 1985	1.91 m (6 ft 3 in)	87 kg (192 lb)	332 cm (131 in)	setter
19	(Canada) Bradley Gunter	5 December 1993	1.98 m (6 ft 6 in)	91 kg (201 lb)	354 cm (139 in)	opposite

== 2016/2017 ==
The following is the LOTOS Trefl Gdańsk roster in the 2016–17 PlusLiga.

Head coach:	(Italy) Andrea Anastasi
Assistant:	(Poland) Wojciech Serafin

No.	Name	Date of birth	Height	Weight	Spike	Position
1	(Poland) Patryk Niemiec	18 February 1997	2.02 m (6 ft 8 in)	89 kg (196 lb)	353 cm (139 in)	middle blocker
2	(Poland) Wojciech Grzyb	4 January 1981	2.05 m (6 ft 9 in)	105 kg (231 lb)	355 cm (140 in)	middle blocker
3	(Poland) Piotr Gacek	16 September 1978	1.85 m (6 ft 1 in)	80 kg (180 lb)	0 cm (0 in)	libero
4	(Poland) Przemysław Stępień	7 February 1994	1.85 m (6 ft 1 in)	82 kg (181 lb)	335 cm (132 in)	setter
5	(Poland) Bartosz Pietruczuk	26 February 1993	1.96 m (6 ft 5 in)	78 kg (172 lb)	335 cm (132 in)	outside hitter
6	(Poland) Szymon Jakubiszak	13 February 1998	2.08 m (6 ft 10 in)	98 kg (216 lb)	370 cm (150 in)	outside hitter
7	(Poland) Damian Schulz	26 February 1990	2.08 m (6 ft 10 in)	95 kg (209 lb)	355 cm (140 in)	opposite
8	(Poland) Maciej Ptaszyński	16 November 1998	1.95 m (6 ft 5 in)	74 kg (163 lb)	330 cm (130 in)	outside hitter
9	(Ukraine) Dmytro Pashytskyy	29 November 1987	2.05 m (6 ft 9 in)	100 kg (220 lb)	355 cm (140 in)	middle blocker
10	(Poland) Bartosz Gawryszewski (C)	22 August 1985	2.02 m (6 ft 8 in)	89 kg (196 lb)	348 cm (137 in)	middle blocker
11	(Poland) Wojciech Ferens	5 April 1991	1.94 m (6 ft 4 in)	96 kg (212 lb)	358 cm (141 in)	outside hitter
13	(Poland) Szymon Romać	1 October 1992	1.96 m (6 ft 5 in)	98 kg (216 lb)	355 cm (140 in)	opposite
15	(Poland) Mateusz Mika	21 January 1991	2.06 m (6 ft 9 in)	91 kg (201 lb)	352 cm (139 in)	outside hitter
16	(Poland) Fabian Majcherski	28 March 1997	1.75 m (5 ft 9 in)	74 kg (163 lb)	0 cm (0 in)	libero
17	(Poland) Miłosz Hebda	11 March 1991	2.06 m (6 ft 9 in)	89 kg (196 lb)	350 cm (140 in)	outside hitter
19	(Poland) Sebastian Sobczak	24 June 1997	1.97 m (6 ft 6 in)	80 kg (180 lb)	338 cm (133 in)	setter
20	(Slovakia) Michal Masný	14 August 1979	1.82 m (6 ft 0 in)	75 kg (165 lb)	330 cm (130 in)	setter

== 2015/2016 ==
The following is the LOTOS Trefl Gdańsk roster in the 2015–16 PlusLiga.

Head coach:	(Italy) Andrea Anastasi
Assistant:	(Poland) Wojciech Serafin

No.	Name	Date of birth	Height	Weight	Spike	Position
1	(Poland) Sławomir Zemlik	3 November 1992	2.00 m (6 ft 7 in)	87 kg (192 lb)	332 cm (131 in)	outside hitter
2	(Poland) Wojciech Grzyb	4 January 1981	2.05 m (6 ft 9 in)	105 kg (231 lb)	355 cm (140 in)	middle blocker
3	(Poland) Piotr Gacek	16 September 1978	1.85 m (6 ft 1 in)	80 kg (180 lb)	0 cm (0 in)	libero
4	(Poland) Przemysław Stępień	7 February 1994	1.85 m (6 ft 1 in)	82 kg (181 lb)	335 cm (132 in)	setter
5	(Italy) Marco Falaschi	18 September 1987	1.87 m (6 ft 2 in)	73 kg (161 lb)	325 cm (128 in)	setter
7	(Poland) Damian Schulz	26 February 1990	2.08 m (6 ft 10 in)	95 kg (209 lb)	355 cm (140 in)	opposite
8	(Poland) Karol Behrendt	14 April 1995	1.97 m (6 ft 6 in)	76 kg (168 lb)	338 cm (133 in)	middle blocker
9	(Germany) Sebastian Schwarz	2 October 1985	1.97 m (6 ft 6 in)	96 kg (212 lb)	350 cm (140 in)	outside hitter
10	(Poland) Bartosz Gawryszewski (C)	22 August 1985	2.02 m (6 ft 8 in)	89 kg (196 lb)	348 cm (137 in)	middle blocker
11	(United States) Murphy Troy	31 May 1989	2.02 m (6 ft 8 in)	99 kg (218 lb)	360 cm (140 in)	opposite
12	(Poland) Artur Ratajczak	18 September 1990	2.06 m (6 ft 9 in)	94 kg (207 lb)	354 cm (139 in)	middle blocker
15	(Poland) Mateusz Mika	21 January 1991	2.06 m (6 ft 9 in)	91 kg (201 lb)	352 cm (139 in)	outside hitter
17	(Poland) Miłosz Hebda	11 March 1991	2.06 m (6 ft 9 in)	89 kg (196 lb)	350 cm (140 in)	outside hitter
18	(Poland) Mateusz Czunkiewicz	16 December 1996	0 m (0 in)	0 kg (0 lb)	0 cm (0 in)	libero
19	(Poland) Kamil Dębski	17 October 1997	1.98 m (6 ft 6 in)	80 kg (180 lb)	337 cm (133 in)	outside hitter

== 2014/2015 ==
The following is the LOTOS Trefl Gdańsk roster in the 2014–15 PlusLiga.

Head coach:	(Italy) Andrea Anastasi
Assistant:	(Poland) Wojciech Serafin

No.	Name	Date of birth	Height	Weight	Spike	Position
2	(Poland) Wojciech Grzyb	4 January 1981	2.05 m (6 ft 9 in)	105 kg (231 lb)	355 cm (140 in)	middle blocker
3	(Poland) Piotr Gacek	16 September 1978	1.85 m (6 ft 1 in)	80 kg (180 lb)	0 cm (0 in)	libero
4	(Poland) Przemysław Stępień	7 February 1994	1.85 m (6 ft 1 in)	82 kg (181 lb)	335 cm (132 in)	setter
5	(Italy) Marco Falaschi	18 September 1987	1.87 m (6 ft 2 in)	73 kg (161 lb)	325 cm (128 in)	setter
6	(Poland) Moustapha M'Baye	18 September 1992	0 m (0 in)	0 kg (0 lb)	0 cm (0 in)	middle blocker
7	(Poland) Damian Schulz	26 February 1990	2.08 m (6 ft 10 in)	95 kg (209 lb)	355 cm (140 in)	opposite
9	(Germany) Sebastian Schwarz	2 October 1985	1.97 m (6 ft 6 in)	96 kg (212 lb)	350 cm (140 in)	outside hitter
10	(Poland) Bartosz Gawryszewski (C)	22 August 1985	2.02 m (6 ft 8 in)	89 kg (196 lb)	348 cm (137 in)	middle blocker
11	(United States) Murphy Troy	31 May 1989	2.02 m (6 ft 8 in)	99 kg (218 lb)	360 cm (140 in)	opposite
12	(Poland) Artur Ratajczak	18 September 1990	2.06 m (6 ft 9 in)	94 kg (207 lb)	354 cm (139 in)	middle blocker
13	(Poland) Krzysztof Wierzbowski	18 July 1988	1.97 m (6 ft 6 in)	88 kg (194 lb)	340 cm (130 in)	outside hitter
14	(Poland) Sławomir Stolc	23 January 1993	0 m (0 in)	0 kg (0 lb)	0 cm (0 in)	outside hitter
15	(Poland) Mateusz Mika	21 January 1991	2.06 m (6 ft 9 in)	91 kg (201 lb)	352 cm (139 in)	outside hitter
18	(Poland) Mateusz Czunkiewicz	16 December 1996	0 m (0 in)	0 kg (0 lb)	0 cm (0 in)	libero

== 2013/2014 ==
The following is the LOTOS Trefl Gdańsk roster in the 2013–14 PlusLiga.

Head coach:	(Poland) Radosław Panas
Assistant:	(Poland) Wojciech Serafin

No.	Name	Date of birth	Height	Weight	Spike	Position
1	(Poland) Wojciech Żaliński	8 January 1988	1.96 m (6 ft 5 in)	92 kg (203 lb)	345 cm (136 in)	outside hitter
2	(Poland) Michał Zaborowski	26 April 1993	1.75 m (5 ft 9 in)	60 kg (130 lb)	0 cm (0 in)	libero
3	(Poland) Grzegorz Łomacz (C)	1 October 1987	1.88 m (6 ft 2 in)	80 kg (180 lb)	336 cm (132 in)	setter
4	(Poland) Przemysław Stępień	7 February 1994	1.85 m (6 ft 1 in)	82 kg (181 lb)	335 cm (132 in)	setter
5	(Poland) Sławomir Zemlik	3 November 1992	2.00 m (6 ft 7 in)	87 kg (192 lb)	332 cm (131 in)	outside hitter
6	(Poland) Moustapha M'Baye	18 September 1992	0 m (0 in)	0 kg (0 lb)	0 cm (0 in)	middle blocker
7	(Poland) Paweł Rusek	21 January 1983	1.83 m (6 ft 0 in)	76 kg (168 lb)	315 cm (124 in)	libero
8	(Poland) Jakub Jarosz	10 February 1987	1.97 m (6 ft 6 in)	91 kg (201 lb)	360 cm (140 in)	opposite
9	(Poland) Bartosz Pietruczuk	26 February 1993	1.96 m (6 ft 5 in)	78 kg (172 lb)	335 cm (132 in)	outside hitter
10	(Poland) Bartosz Gawryszewski	22 August 1985	2.02 m (6 ft 8 in)	89 kg (196 lb)	348 cm (137 in)	middle blocker
11	(Poland) Maciej Zajder	31 January 1988	0 m (0 in)	0 kg (0 lb)	0 cm (0 in)	middle blocker
12	(Poland) Artur Ratajczak	18 September 1990	2.06 m (6 ft 9 in)	94 kg (207 lb)	354 cm (139 in)	middle blocker
13	(Poland) Krzysztof Wierzbowski	18 July 1988	1.97 m (6 ft 6 in)	88 kg (194 lb)	340 cm (130 in)	outside hitter
14	(Poland) Sławomir Stolc	23 January 1993	0 m (0 in)	0 kg (0 lb)	0 cm (0 in)	outside hitter
15	(Poland) Bartłomiej Kluth	20 December 1992	2.10 m (6 ft 11 in)	109 kg (240 lb)	357 cm (141 in)	outside hitter
16	(Poland) Paweł Mikołajczak	20 June 1988	1.95 m (6 ft 5 in)	96 kg (212 lb)	350 cm (140 in)	opposite
17	(Poland) Robert Milczarek	28 November 1983	1.88 m (6 ft 2 in)	78 kg (172 lb)	340 cm (130 in)	outside hitter
18	(Poland) Mateusz Czunkiewicz	16 December 1996	0 m (0 in)	0 kg (0 lb)	0 cm (0 in)	libero
