= Bartosz Gawryszewski =

Polish volleyball player

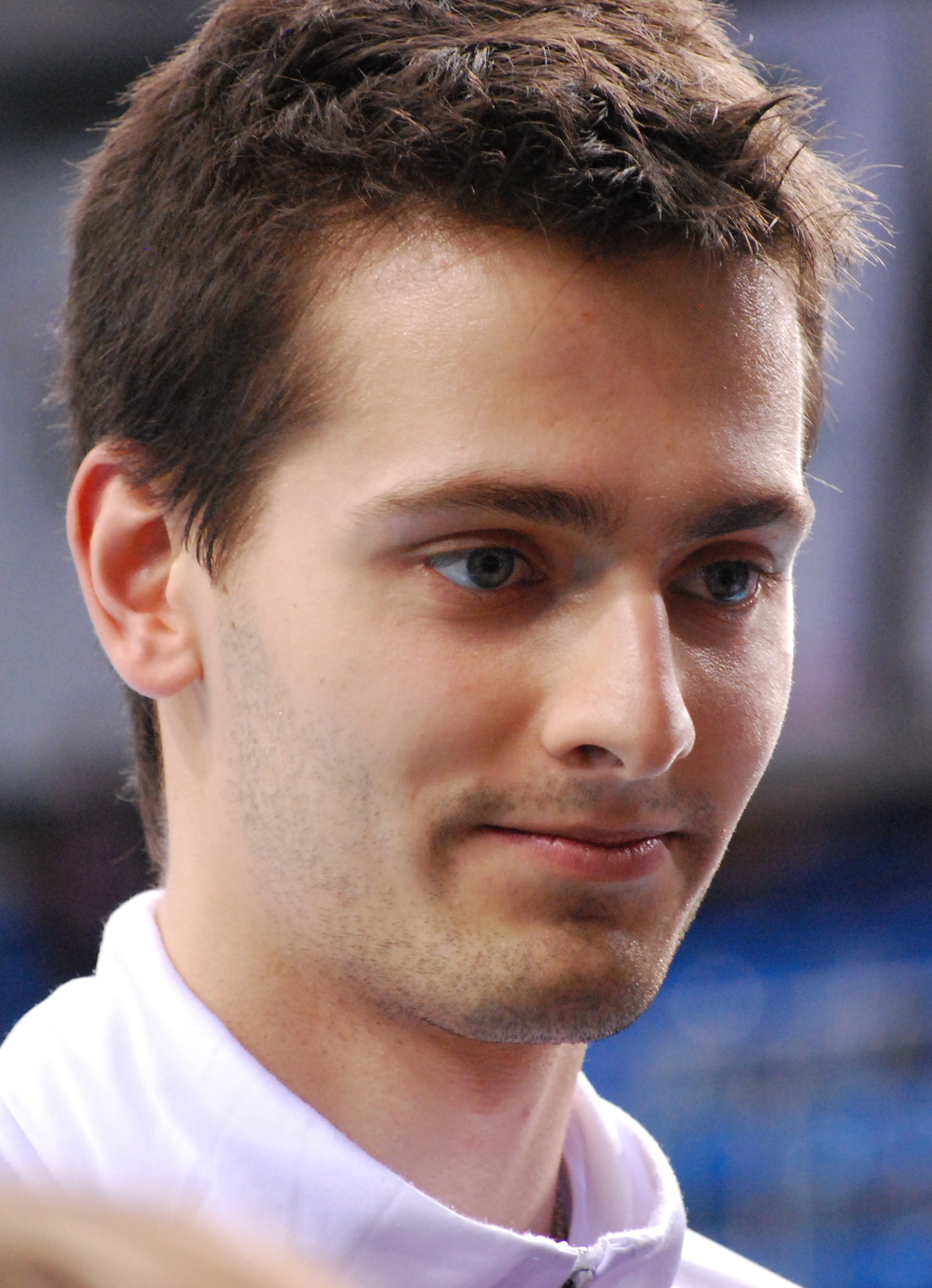

Personal information
- Born: 22 August 1985 (age 41); Warsaw, Poland
- Height: 2.02 m (6 ft 8 in)

Volleyball information
- Position: Middle blocker

Career
Years	Teams
2004–2007; 2007–2008; 2008–2010; 2010–2012; 2012–2017; 2017–2018; 2018–2020; 2020–2022	AZS Częstochowa; Jadar Radom; Asseco Resovia; Jastrzębski Węgiel; Trefl Gdańsk; Espadon Szczecin; Warta Zawiercie; MKS Będzin

Bartosz Gawryszewski (born 22 August 1985) is a Polish former professional volleyball player.

== Career ==
=== Club ===
He debuted in PlusLiga in 2004 as the AZS Częstochowa player. In his first season he won bronze medal of the Polish Championship after matches with Jastrzębski Węgiel. Then played for Jadar Radom. In 2008, he moved to Asseco Resovia Rzeszów. He achieved with this club silver (2008/2009) and bronze (2009/2010) medal of the Polish Championship. In 2010/2012 he was a player of Jastrzębski Węgiel. In 2011 Jastrzębski Węgiel, including Gawryszewski, won silver medal of the Club World Championship 2011 held in Qatar. Since 2012 he has been playing for LOTOS Trefl Gdańsk. In 2014 he was elected captain of the team by the coach Anastasi. On April 19, 2015 LOTOS Trefl Gdańsk, including Gawryszewski, achieved Polish Cup 2015. Then he won a silver medal of Polish Championship.

== Honours ==
=== Club ===
- FIVB Club World Championship
  - Doha 2011 – with Jastrzębski Węgiel
- Domestic
  - 2008–09 Polish Championship, with Asseco Resovia
  - 2014–15 Polish Cup, with Lotos Trefl Gdańsk
  - 2014–15 Polish Championship, with Lotos Trefl Gdańsk
  - 2015–16 Polish SuperCup, with Lotos Trefl Gdańsk

=== Youth national team ===
- 2003 CEV U19 European Championship
- 2003 European Youth Olympic Festival
