= Fabian Majcherski =

Polish volleyball player (born 1997)

- Majcherski in 2025

Personal information
- Born: 28 March 1997 (age 29); Lębork, Poland
- Height: 1.75 m (5 ft 9 in)

Volleyball information
- Position: Libero

Career
Years	Teams
2016–2021; 2021–2022; 2022–2023; 2023–2024; 2024–2026	Trefl Gdańsk; ZAKSA Strzelce Opolskie; Volleyball Bisons Bühl; MKS Będzin; Trefl Gdańsk

Fabian Majcherski (born 28 March 1997) is a Polish former professional volleyball player.

== Honours ==
=== Club ===
- Domestic
  - 2017–18 Polish Cup, with Trefl Gdańsk

=== Individual awards ===
- 2018: Polish Cup – Best defender
