= Szymon Jakubiszak =

Polish volleyball player (born 1998)

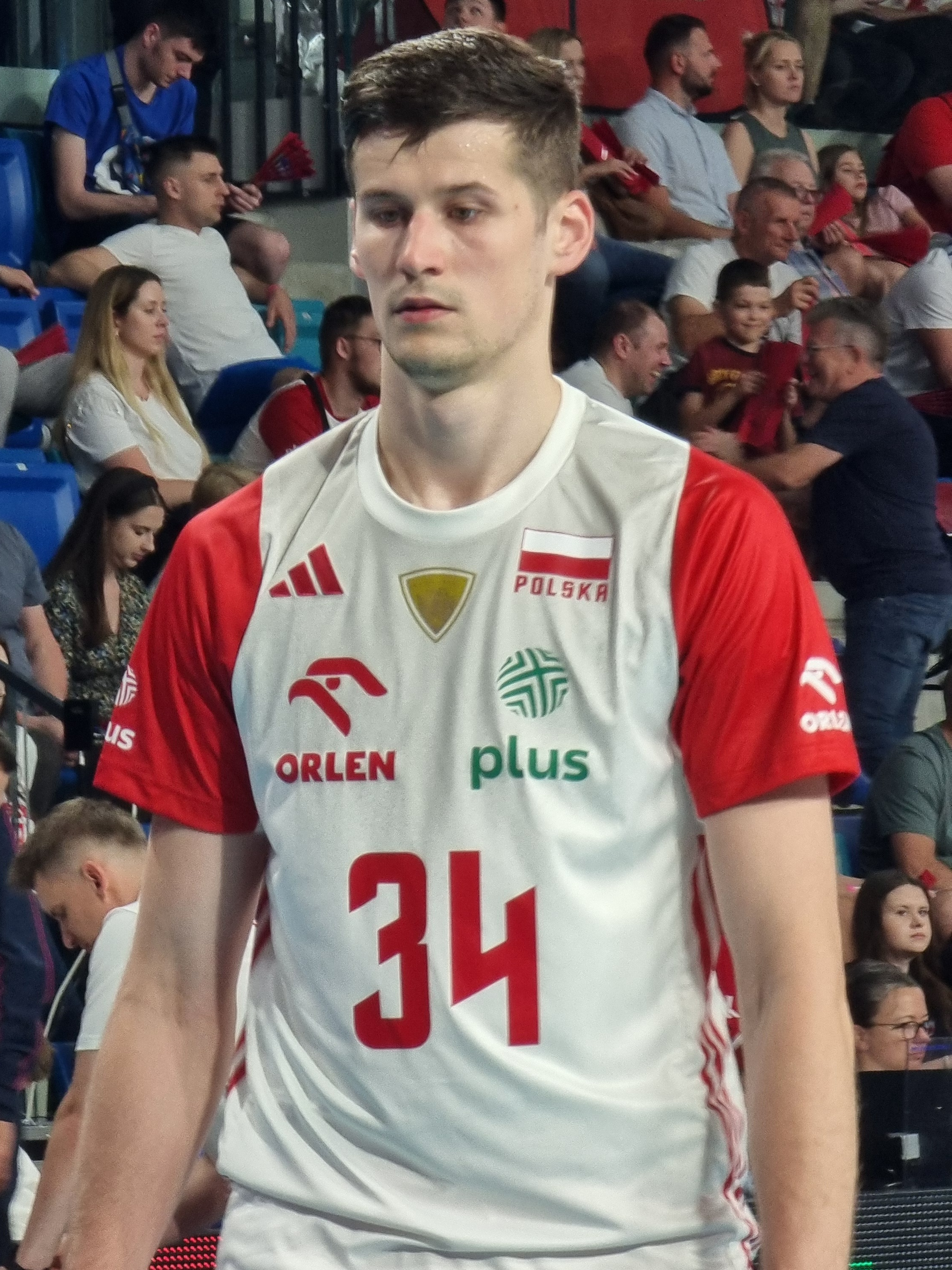
- Szymon Jakubiszak in 2024

Personal information
- Born: 13 February 1998 (age 28); Gdańsk, Poland
- Height: 2.08 m (6 ft 10 in)
- Weight: 98 kg (216 lb)
- Spike: 370 cm (146 in)

Volleyball information
- Position: Middle blocker
- Current club: ZAKSA Kędzierzyn-Koźle
- Number: 34

Career
Years	Teams
2016–2020; 2020–2021; 2021–2025; 2025–	Trefl Gdańsk; Cuprum Lubin; AZS Olsztyn; ZAKSA Kędzierzyn-Koźle

National team
Poland
Honours
Men's volleyball
Representing Poland
FIVB World Championship
Bronze medal – third place	2025 Philippines
FIVB Nations League
Gold medal – first place	2025 Ningbo
Gold medal – first place	2026 Ningbo
CEV European Championship
Gold medal – first place	2026 Bulgaria/Finland/Italy/Romania

Szymon Jakubiszak (born 13 February 1998) is a Polish professional volleyball player who plays as a middle blocker for ZAKSA Kędzierzyn-Koźle and the Poland national team.

== Career ==
=== Club ===
After 5 seasons spent playing in youth teams of Lotos Trefl Gdańsk, he made his debut in the Polish PlusLiga in 2016.

=== National team ===
On 10 September 2016, he achieved a title of the U20 European Champion after winning 7 out of 7 matches at the tournament, and beating Ukraine in the final (3–1). On 2 July 2017, Poland, including Jakubiszak, achieved a title of the U21 World Champions after beating Cuba in the final (3–0). His national team won 47 matches in the row and never lost. The U21 World Champion title ended his time in youth national teams.

== Honours ==
=== Club ===
- Domestic
  - 2017–18 Polish Cup, with Trefl Gdańsk

=== Youth national team ===
- 2016 CEV U20 European Championship
- 2017 FIVB U21 World Championship

=== Individual awards ===
- 2026: CEV European Championship – Best middle blocker
