= Wojciech Grzyb =

Polish volleyball player

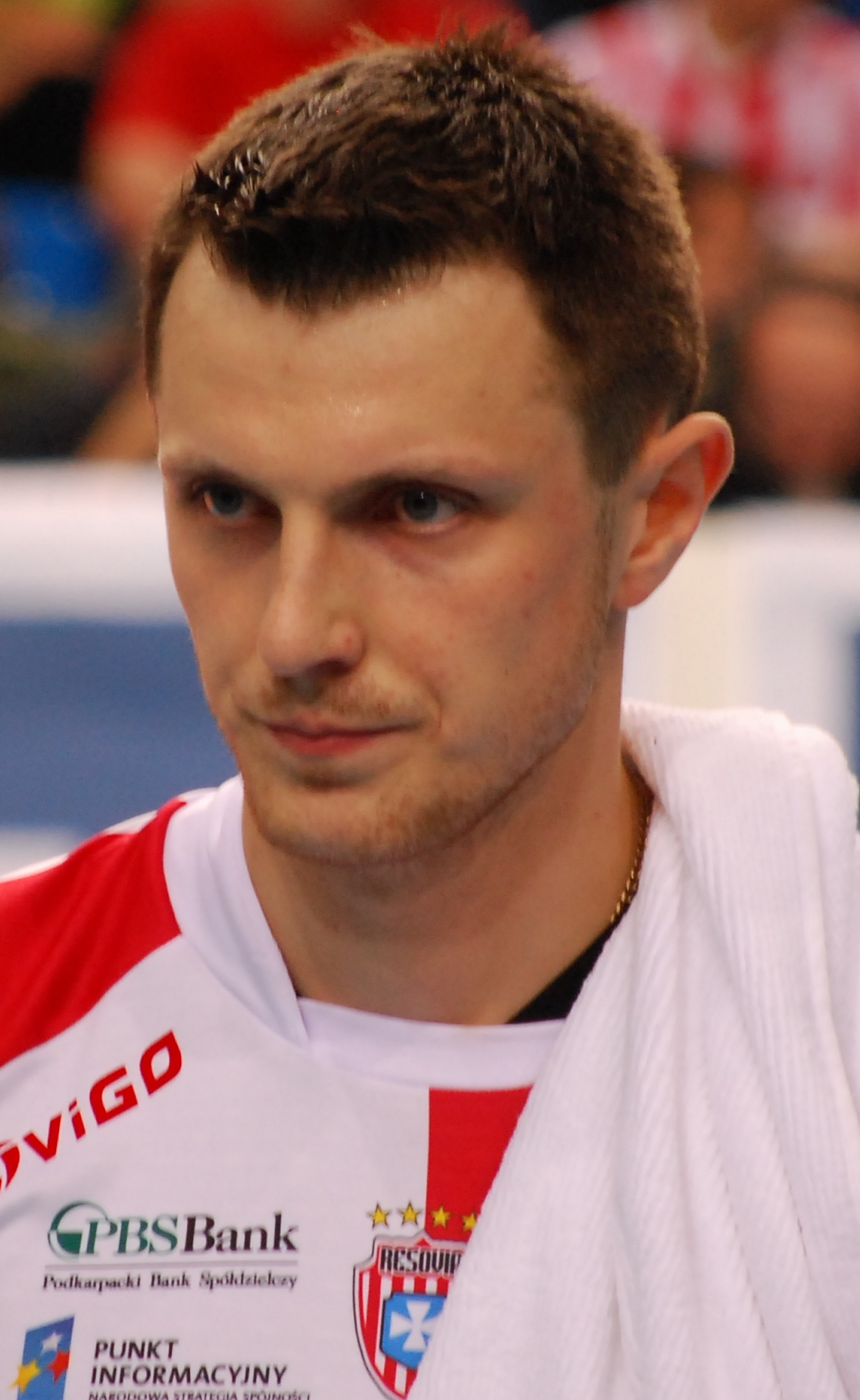

Personal information
- Full name: Wojciech Dariusz Grzyb
- Nationality: (Poland) Polish
- Born: 4 January 1981 (age 45); Olsztyn, Poland
- Height: 2.05 m (6 ft 9 in)

Volleyball information
- Position: Middle blocker

Career
Years	Teams
2000–2009; 2009–2014; 2014–2020	(Poland) AZS Olsztyn (Poland) Asseco Resovia (Poland) Trefl Gdańsk

National team
2003–2015	Poland (120)
Honours
Men's volleyball
Representing Poland
FIVB World Championship
Silver medal – second place	2006 Japan

Wojciech Dariusz Grzyb (born 4 January 1981) is a Polish former volleyball player, member of the Poland men's national volleyball team, silver medallist at the 2006 World Championship, Polish Champion (2012, 2013).

== Personal life ==
Grzyb was born in Olsztyn, Poland. He is married to Katarzyna. They have three children – son Michał (born 2004) and two daughters: Lena and the youngest - Liliana (born 13 August 2013).

== Career ==
He debuted in PlusLiga with AZS Olsztyn in 2000. With the club from Olsztyn, he won two silver medals of the Polish championship. From 2009 to 2014 he was a player of Asseco Resovia Rzeszów. With Rzeszów he won two titles of Polish Champion, in seasons 2011/2012 and 2012/2013. In June 2014 Grzyb signed a contract with LOTOS Trefl Gdańsk. In the season 2014/2015 LOTOS Trefl Gdańsk, including Grzyb won the Polish Cup and the silver medal of Polish Championship. In May 2015 he extended his contract with LOTOS Trefl Gdańsk until 2017.

== Sporting achievements ==
=== Clubs ===
- CEV Cup
  - 2011/2012 – with Asseco Resovia
- National championships
  - 2011/2012 Polish Championship, with Asseco Resovia
  - 2012/2013 Polish Championship, with Asseco Resovia
  - 2013/2014 Polish SuperCup, with Asseco Resovia
  - 2014/2015 Polish Cup, with Trefl Gdańsk
  - 2015/2016 Polish SuperCup, with Trefl Gdańsk
  - 2017/2018 Polish Cup, with Trefl Gdańsk

=== State awards ===
- 2006: Gold Cross of Merit
