= Sławomir Stolc =

Polish volleyball player (born 1993)

Personal information
- Nationality: (Poland) Polish
- Born: 23 January 1993 (age 33); Kościerzyna, Poland
- Height: 1.98 m (6 ft 6 in)
- Weight: 78 kg (172 lb)
- Spike: 348 cm (137 in)
- Block: 318 cm (125 in)

Volleyball information
- Position: Outside hitter

Career
Years	Teams
2013–2015; 2015; 2015–2016; 2016–2017; 2017–2018; 2018–2019; 2019–2020; 2020–2021	(Poland) Trefl Gdańsk (Poland) ZAKSA Kędzierzyn-Koźle (Poland) Effector Kielce (Czech Republic) Dukla Liberec (Poland) AZS Częstochowa (Poland) Stal Nysa (Poland) LKPS Lublin (Poland) GKS Katowice

Sławomir Stolc (born 23 January 1993) is a Polish volleyball player.

== Career ==
=== Clubs ===
Stolc played in youth Polish Leagues as a Lotos Trefl Gdańsk player, but in 2013 he joined a squad and debuted in PlusLiga. In 2014, he signed a one-year contract with Lotos Trefl Gdańsk. On April 19, 2015 he won the Polish Cup 2015 with Lotos Trefl Gdańsk. Then he won the silver medal of the Polish Championship.

== Sporting achievements ==
=== Clubs ===
- National championships
  - 2014/2015 Polish Cup, with LOTOS Trefl Gdańsk
