= Mateusz Czunkiewicz =

Polish volleyball player (born 1996)

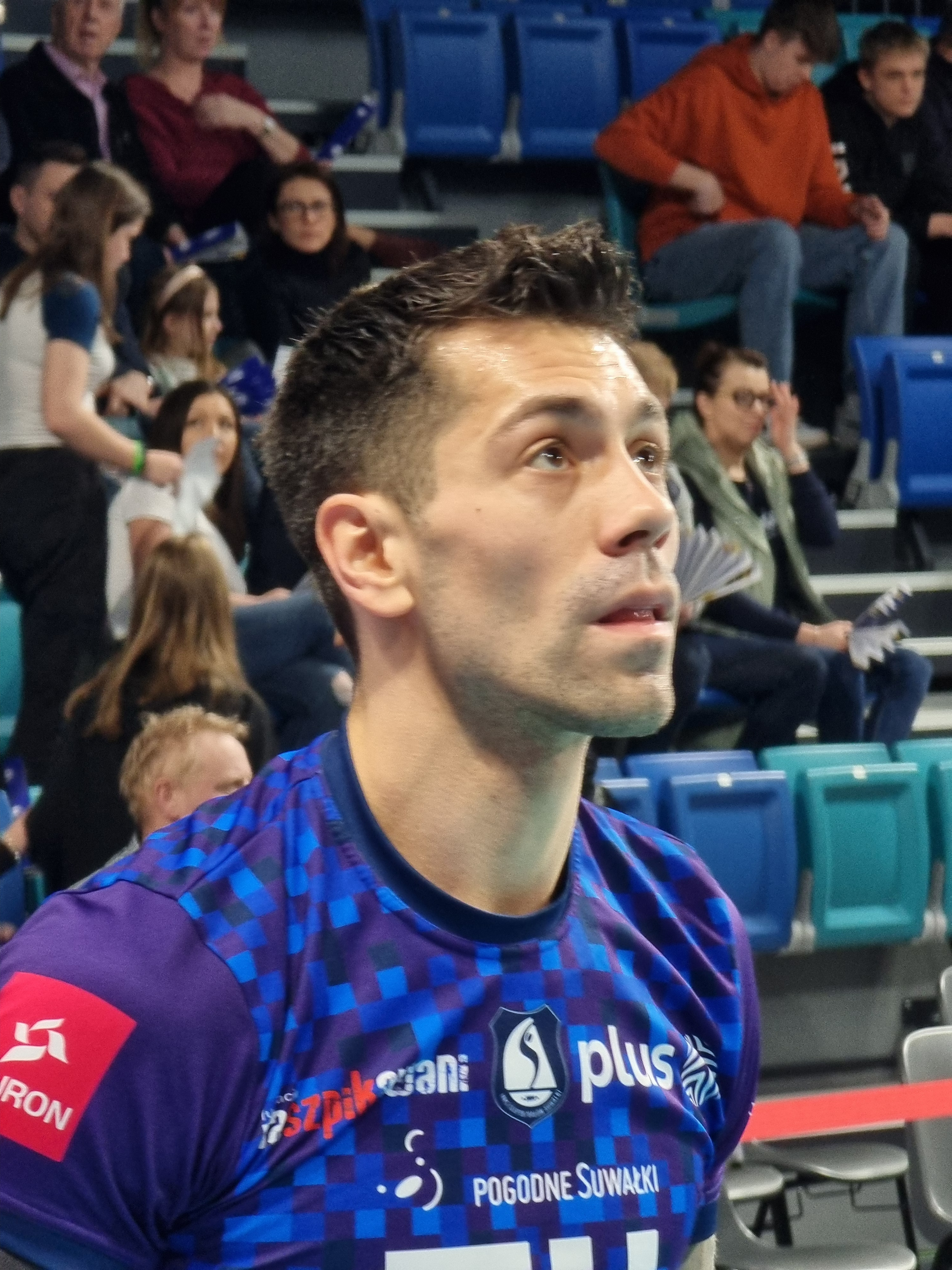
- Mateusz Czunkiewicz in 2024

Personal information
- Nickname: Czunek
- Born: 16 December 1996 (age 29); Bartoszyce, Poland
- Height: 1.80 m (5 ft 11 in)
- Weight: 73 kg (161 lb)

Volleyball information
- Position: Libero
- Current club: ZAKSA Kędzierzyn-Koźle
- Number: 24

Career
Years	Teams
2011–2016; 2016–2017; 2017–2018; 2018–2020; 2020–2025; 2025–	Trefl Gdańsk; Łuczniczka Bydgoszcz; Effector Kielce; Stal Nysa; Ślepsk Suwałki; ZAKSA Kędzierzyn-Koźle

Mateusz Czunkiewicz (born 16 December 1996) is a Polish professional volleyball player who plays as a libero for ZAKSA Kędzierzyn-Koźle.

== Honours ==
=== Club ===
- Domestic
  - 2014–15 Polish Cup, with Trefl Gdańsk
  - 2014–15 Polish Championship, with Trefl Gdańsk
  - 2015–16 Polish SuperCup, with Trefl Gdańsk
