= Bradley Gunter =

Canadian volleyball player (born 1993)

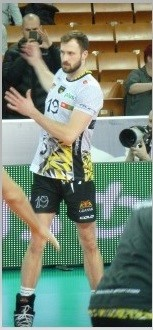
- Gunter in 2018

Personal information
- Full name: Bradley Robert Gunter
- Nationality: Canadian
- Born: 5 December 1993 (age 32); Comox, British Columbia, Canada
- Height: 1.98 m (6 ft 6 in)
- Weight: 91 kg (201 lb)
- Spike: 354 cm (139 in)
- Block: 323 cm (127 in)
- Education: Thompson Rivers University

Volleyball information
- Position: Opposite
- Current club: Bank Sumselbabel
- Number: 19

Career
Years	Teams
2011–2016; 2016–2017; 2017–2018; 2018-	TRU WolfPack; BIGBANK Tartu; Trefl Gdańsk; VC Hebar Pazardzhik

National team
2013; 2017–	Canada U21; Canada
- Last updated: 23 December 2017

Bradley Robert Gunter (born 5 December 1993) is a Canadian volleyball player. He is a member of the Canada men's national volleyball team and Indonesian club Bank Sumselbabel

== Career ==
Bradley Gunter began his post-secondary volleyball career with Thompson Rivers University WolfPack in 2011. He signed with Estonian club BIGBANK Tartu in 2016, before signing for Polish club Lotos Trefl Gdańsk in 2017. At 2018 Bradley Gunter signed the Bulgarian ambitious project of VC Hebar Pazardzhik.

=== National team ===
Bradley first joined the national team program in 2013, as a member of the squad that competed in the 2013 FIVB Volleyball Men's U21 World Championship. He joined the senior squad in 2017 as a member of the World League roster.

== Sporting achievements ==
=== Clubs ===
==== National championships ====
- 2016/2017 Baltic Volleyball League, with BIGBANK Tartu
- 2017/2018 Polish Cup, with Trefl Gdańsk
- 2018/2019 Bulgaria CUP, with VC Hebar Pazardzhik
