= Artur Ratajczak =

Polish volleyball player (born 1990)

Personal information
- Full name: Artur Ratajczak
- Born: 18 September 1990 (age 36); Gostyń, Poland
- Height: 2.06 m (6 ft 9 in)
- Weight: 94 kg (207 lb)
- Spike: 354 cm (139 in)

Volleyball information
- Position: Middle blocker
- Current club: MKS Będzin
- Number: 5

Career
Years	Teams
2007–2012; 2012–2013; 2013–2016; 2016–	Trefl Gdańsk; Ślepsk Suwałki; Trefl Gdańsk; MKS Będzin

Artur Ratajczak (born 18 September 1990) is a Polish professional volleyball player who plays as a middle blocker for MKS Będzin.

== Career ==
=== Club ===
In 2013 he came back to Trefl Gdańsk. In June 2014, he signed a new contract with Trefl. On 19 April 2015 LOTOS Trefl Gdańsk, including Ratajczak, achieved Polish Cup 2015. Then he won silver medal of Polish Championship.

== Honours ==
=== Club ===
- Domestic
  - 2014–15 Polish Cup, with Lotos Trefl Gdańsk
  - 2014–15 Polish Championship, with Lotos Trefl Gdańsk
  - 2015–16 Polish SuperCup, with Lotos Trefl Gdańsk
