= Marco Falaschi =

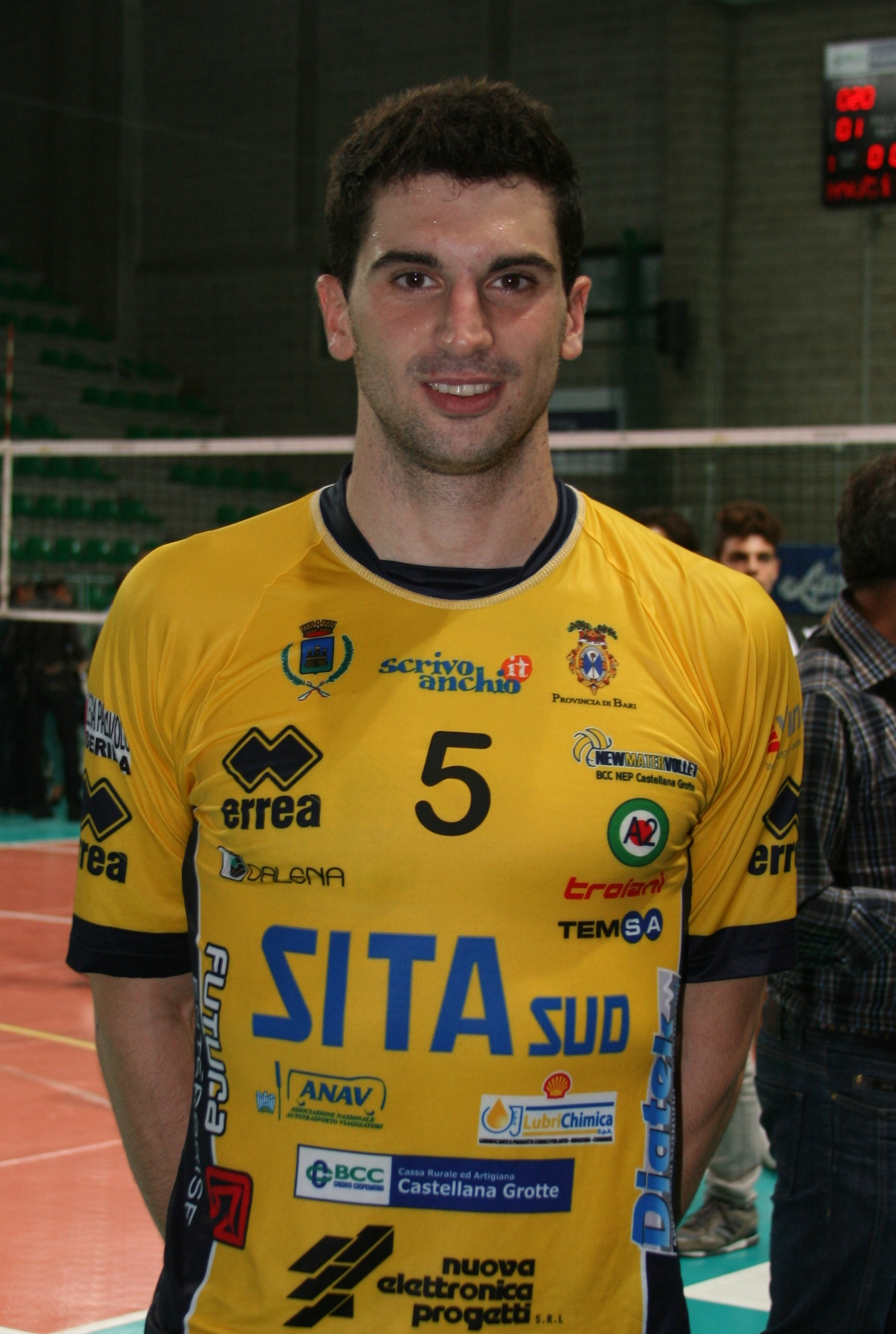

Personal information
- Full name: Marco Falaschi
- Nationality: Italian
- Born: 18 September 1987 (age 39); Santa Croce sull'Arno, Italy
- Height: 1.87 m (6 ft 2 in)
- Weight: 85 kg (187 lb)
- Spike: 330 cm (130 in)
- Block: 304 cm (120 in)

Volleyball information
- Position: Setter
- Current club: ZAKSA Kędzierzyn-Koźle
- Number: 5 (club), 19 (national team)

Career
Years	Teams
2003–2004; 2004–2005; 2005–2006; 2006–2007; 2007–2008; 2008–2010; 2010–2013; 2013–2014; 2014–2016; 2016–2017; 2017–	Lupi Santa Croce; Pallavolo Pescia; Pallavolo Massa; Lupi Santa Croce; Marconi Spoleto; Lupi Santa Croce; NMV Castellana; Budvanska Rivijera Budva; Lotos Trefl Gdańsk; GKS Katowice; ZAKSA Kędzierzyn-Koźle

National team
2011–	Italy
Honours
Representing Italy
Men's volleyball
World League
Bronze medal – third place	2013 Mar del Plata
- Last updated: 18 July 2017

Marco Falaschi (born 18 September 1987) is an Italian volleyball player, a member of the Italy men's national volleyball team and Polish club ZAKSA Kędzierzyn-Koźle, bronze medalist of World League 2013, Montenegrin Champion (2014).

== Career ==
=== Clubs ===
He went to Lotos Trefl Gdańsk in June 2014. He signed a one-year contract. On 19 April 2015 Lotos Trefl Gdańsk, including Falaschi, achieved the Polish Cup 2015. Then he won silver medal of the Polish Championship. In May 2015 he extended his contract with Lotos Trefl Gdańsk until 2016. In season 2016/17 he played for another Polish club GKS Katowice.

== Sporting achievements ==
=== Clubs ===
==== National championships ====
- 2013/2014 Montenegrin Cup, with Budvanska Rivijera Budva
- 2013/2014 Montenegrin Championship, with Budvanska Rivijera Budva
- 2014/2015 Polish Cup, with Lotos Trefl Gdańsk
- 2014/2015 Polish Championship, with Lotos Trefl Gdańsk
- 2015/2016 Polish SuperCup 2015, with Lotos Trefl Gdańsk
- 2017/2018 Polish Championship, with ZAKSA Kędzierzyn-Koźle

=== National team ===
- 2013 FIVB World League
- 2013 Mediterranean Games
