= Maciej Olenderek =

Polish volleyball player (born 1992)

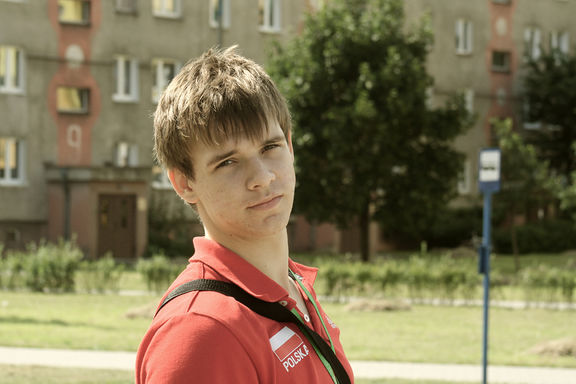
- Olenderek in 2010

Personal information
- Nickname: Oli
- Born: 16 October 1992 (age 34); Żyrardów, Poland
- Height: 1.78 m (5 ft 10 in)
- Weight: 80 kg (176 lb)

Volleyball information
- Position: Libero
- Current club: Projekt Warsaw
- Number: 14

Career
Years	Teams
2011–2017; 2017–2022; 2022–2025; 2025–	AZS Politechnika Warszawska; Trefl Gdańsk; MKS Będzin; Projekt Warsaw

Maciej Olenderek (born 16 October 1992) is a Polish professional volleyball player who plays as a libero for Projekt Warsaw.

== Career ==
=== Club ===
He made his debut in the PlusLiga in 2011. In 2015, he extended his contract with AZS Politechnika Warszawska for the next 2 years. After 6 seasons in the club from Warsaw, he moved to Lotos Trefl Gdańsk.

== Honours ==
=== Club ===
- CEV Challenge Cup
  - 2011–12 – with AZS Politechnika Warszawska
- Domestic
  - 2017–18 Polish Cup, with Trefl Gdańsk
