= Artur Szalpuk =

Polish volleyball player (born 1995)

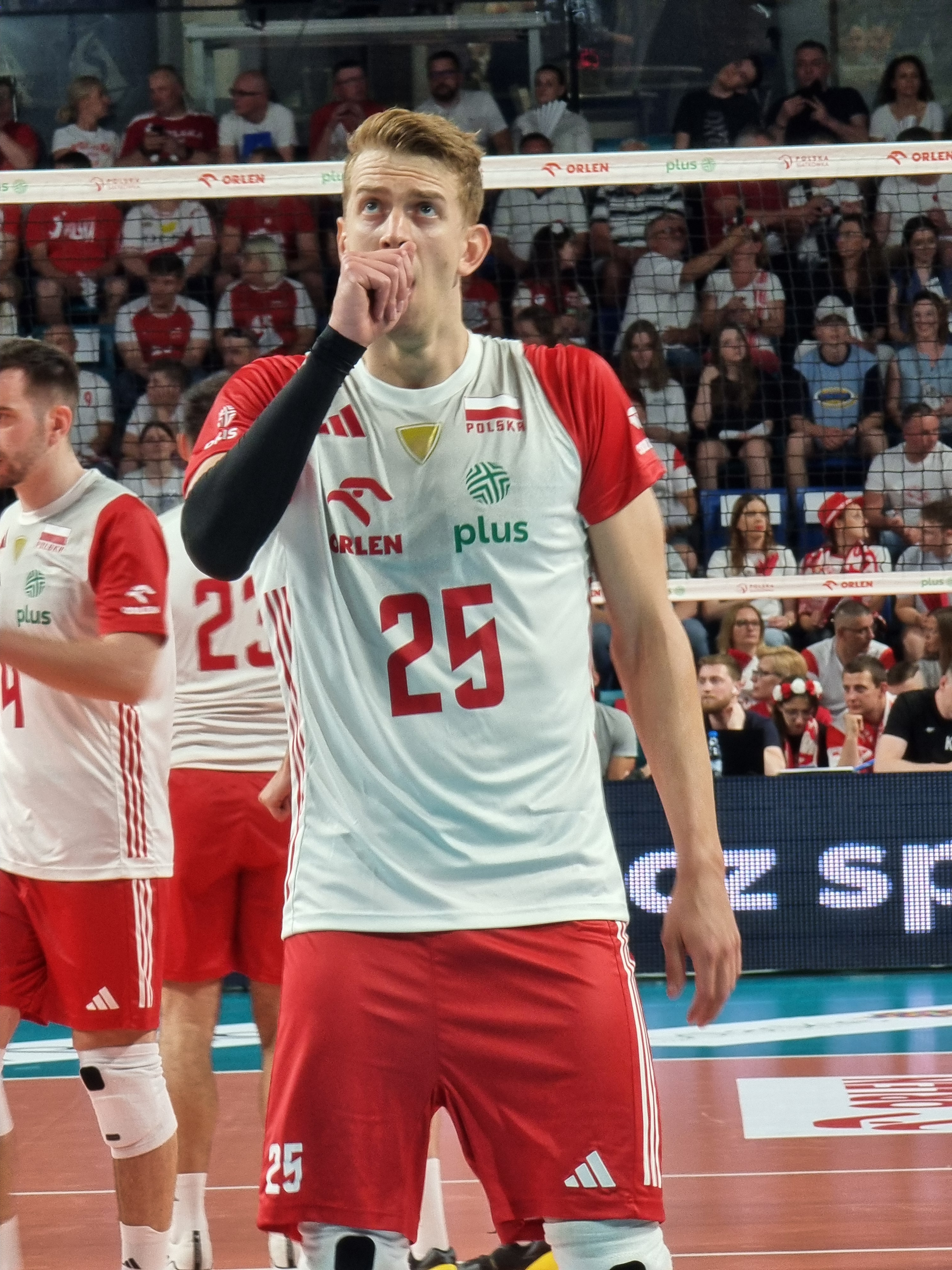
- Artur Szalpuk in 2024

Personal information
- Full name: Artur Kacper Szalpuk
- Nickname: Szalupa
- Born: 20 March 1995 (age 31); Olsztyn, Poland
- Height: 2.02 m (6 ft 8 in)
- Weight: 91 kg (201 lb)
- Spike: 348 cm (137 in)
- Block: 338 cm (133 in)

Volleyball information
- Position: Outside hitter
- Current club: Asseco Resovia
- Number: 12

Career
Years	Teams
2013–2015; 2015–2016; 2016–2017; 2017–2018; 2018–2020; 2020–2021; 2021–2022; 2022–2025; 2025–	AZS Politechnika Warszawska; Czarni Radom; Skra Bełchatów; Trefl Gdańsk; Skra Bełchatów; Projekt Warsaw; Epicentr-Podolyany; Projekt Warsaw; Asseco Resovia

National team
2015–	Poland
Honours
Men's volleyball
Representing Poland
FIVB World Championship
Gold medal – first place	2018 Bulgaria/Italy
Bronze medal – third place	2025 Philippines
FIVB World Cup
Silver medal – second place	2019 Japan
Bronze medal – third place	2015 Japan
FIVB Nations League
Gold medal – first place	2025 Ningbo
Gold medal – first place	2026 Ningbo
CEV European Championship
Gold medal – first place	2026 Bulgaria/Finland/Italy/Romania
Bronze medal – third place	2019 Belgium/France/Netherlands/Slovenia

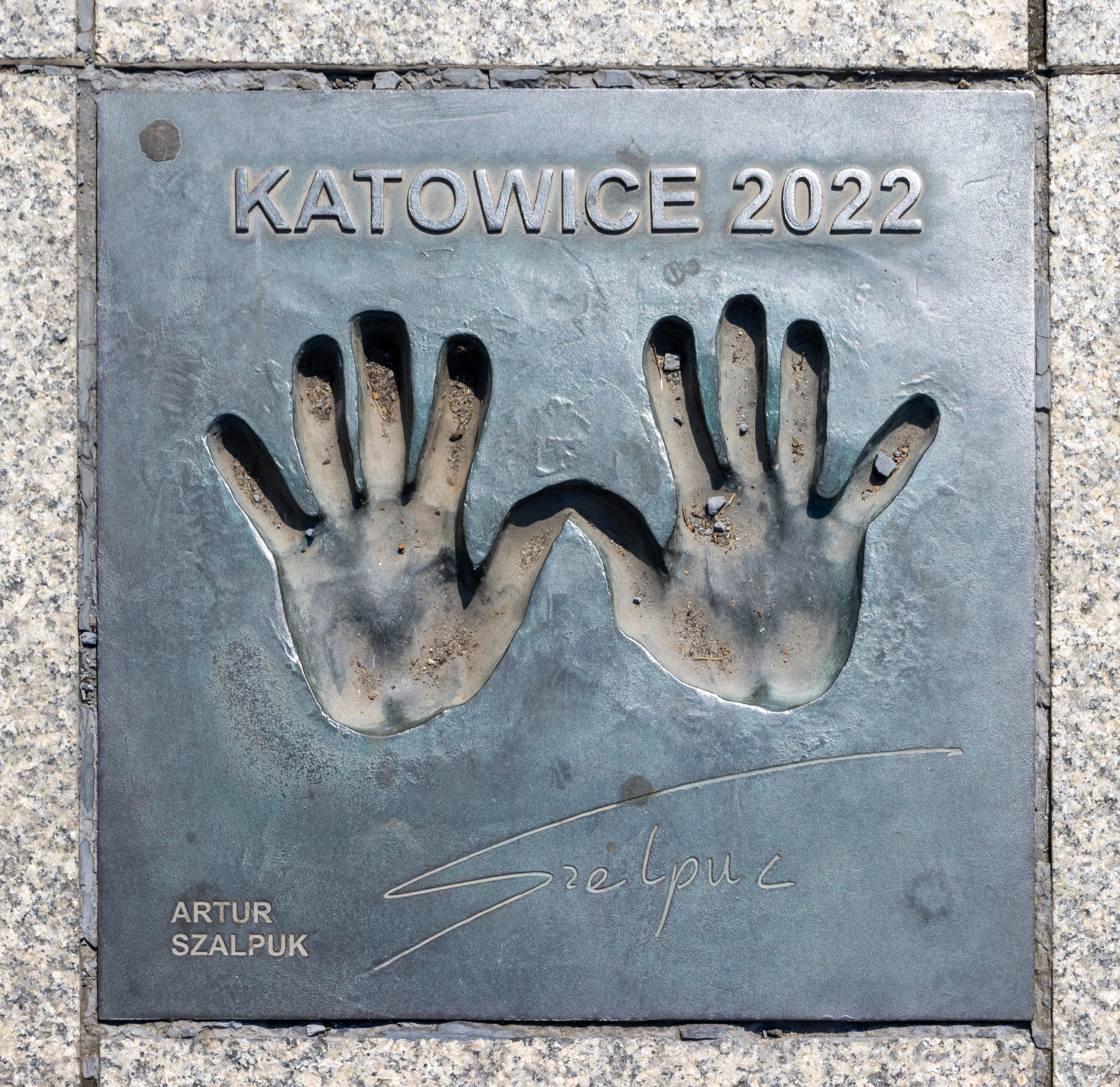
Hand prints and signature at the Avenue of Volleyball Stars, Katowice

Artur Kacper Szalpuk (born 20 March 1995) is a Polish professional volleyball player who plays as an outside hitter for Asseco Resovia and the Poland national team. Szalpuk won a gold medal at the 2018 World Championship held in Italy.

== Career ==
=== National team ===
On 2 April 2015, Szalpuk was called up to the national team by Stéphane Antiga. After the training camp in Spała he joined team B led by Andrzej Kowal. He took part in the 1st edition of the 2015 European Games, where Poland took 4th place. In July, he joined Poland's team A during an intercontinental round of the 2015 World League held in Kraków. He made his debut in the senior national team on 4 July 2015 in a lost match against the United States (1–3).

On 30 September 2018, Poland claimed their third 2018 World Champions title. Poland beat Brazil in the final 3–0 and defended the title from 2014.

== Honours ==
=== Club ===
- CEV Challenge Cup
  - 2023–24 – with Projekt Warsaw
- Domestic
  - 2017–18 Polish Cup, with Trefl Gdańsk
  - 2018–19 Polish SuperCup, with PGE Skra Bełchatów
  - 2021–22 Ukrainian Championship, with Epicentr-Podolyany

=== Youth national team ===
- 2013 CEV U19 European Championship
- 2013 European Youth Olympic Festival

=== Individual awards ===
- 2017: Polish Cup – Best server
- 2018: Polish Cup – Best opposite

=== State awards ===
- 2018: Gold Cross of Merit
