= Przemysław Stępień =

Polish volleyball player (born 1994)

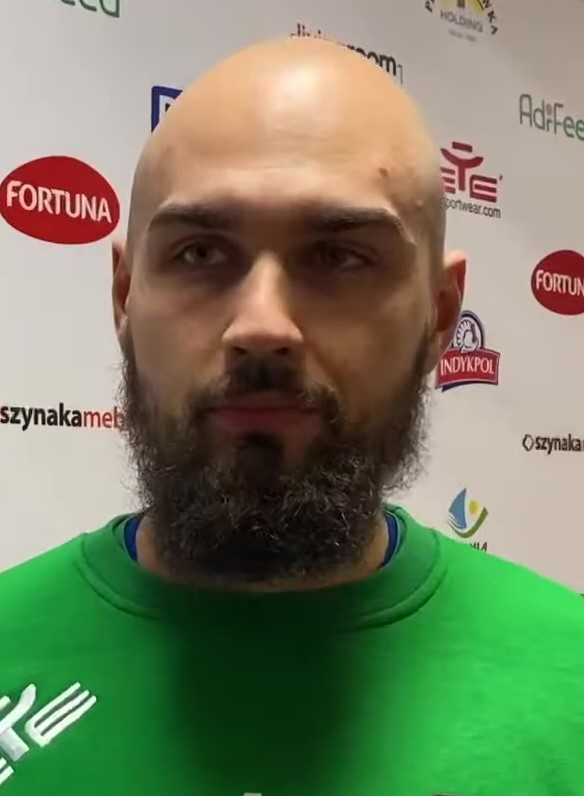

Personal information
- Born: 7 February 1994 (age 32); Iława, Poland
- Height: 1.85 m (6 ft 1 in)
- Weight: 82 kg (181 lb)
- Spike: 335 cm (132 in)

Volleyball information
- Position: Setter
- Current club: Trefl Gdańsk
- Number: 4

Career
Years	Teams
2010–2017; 2017–2018; 2018–2020; 2020–2021; 2021–2022; 2022–2024; 2024–2025; 2025–	Trefl Gdańsk; Effector Kielce; ZAKSA Kędzierzyn-Koźle; AZS Olsztyn; Cuprum Lubin; ZAKSA Kędzierzyn-Koźle; Stilon Gorzów; Trefl Gdańsk

Przemysław Stępień (born 7 February 1994) is a Polish professional volleyball player who plays as a setter for Trefl Gdańsk.

== Honours ==
=== Club ===
- CEV Champions League
  - 2022–23 – with ZAKSA Kędzierzyn-Koźle
- Domestic
  - 2014–15 Polish Cup, with Trefl Gdańsk
  - 2015–16 Polish SuperCup, with Trefl Gdańsk
  - 2018–19 Polish Cup, with ZAKSA Kędzierzyn-Koźle
  - 2018–19 Polish Championship, with ZAKSA Kędzierzyn-Koźle
  - 2019–20 Polish SuperCup, with ZAKSA Kędzierzyn-Koźle
  - 2022–23 Polish Cup, with ZAKSA Kędzierzyn-Koźle
  - 2023–24 Polish SuperCup, with ZAKSA Kędzierzyn-Koźle
