= Damian Schulz =

Polish volleyball player (born 1990)

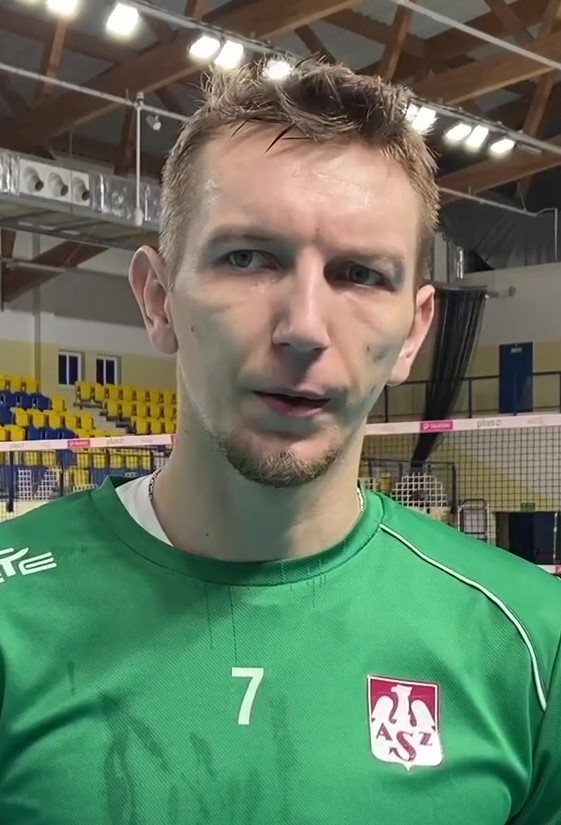

Personal information
- Nickname: Bocian
- Born: 26 February 1990 (age 36); Lębork, Poland
- Height: 2.08 m (6 ft 10 in)
- Weight: 95 kg (209 lb)
- Spike: 355 cm (140 in)
- Block: 330 cm (130 in)

Volleyball information
- Position: Opposite
- Current club: Trefl Gdańsk
- Number: 7

Career
Years	Teams
2009–2011; 2011–2012; 2012–2013; 2013–2014; 2014–2018; 2018–2020; 2020–2021; 2021–2022; 2022–2023; 2023–2024; 2024–2025; 2025–	SPS Lębork; Joker Piła; AZS UAM Poznań; KPS Siedlce; Trefl Gdańsk; Asseco Resovia; AZS Olsztyn; Skra Bełchatów; Czarni Radom; LUK Lublin; MKS Będzin; Trefl Gdańsk

National team
2015–	Poland
Honours
Men's volleyball
Representing Poland
FIVB World Championship
Gold medal – first place	2018 Bulgaria/Italy

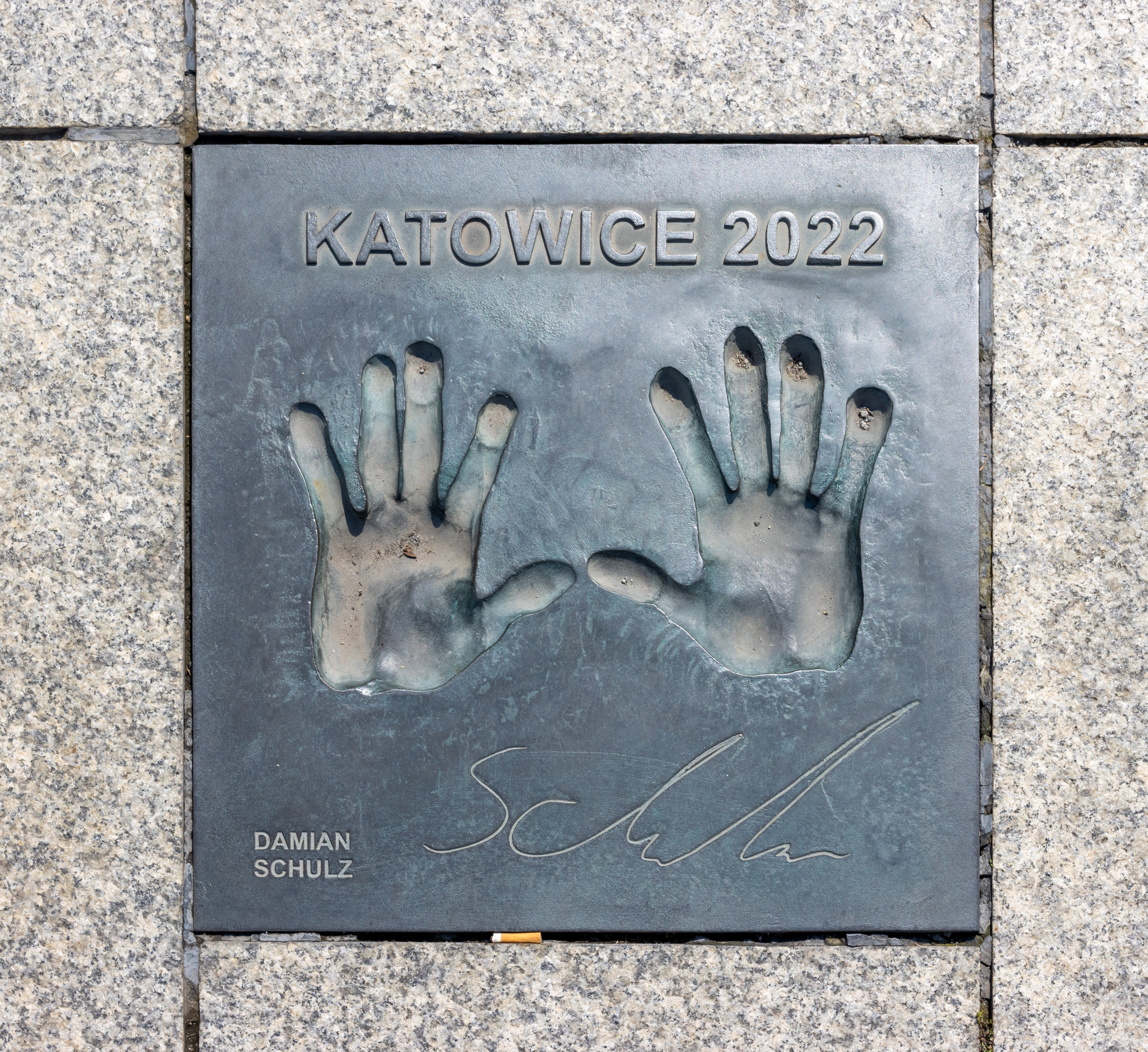
Hand prints and signature at the Avenue of Volleyball Stars, Katowice

Damian Schulz (born 26 February 1990) is a Polish professional volleyball player who plays as an opposite spiker for Trefl Gdańsk. He is a former member of the Poland national team with which he won the 2018 World Champion title.

== Career ==
=== National team ===
He was called up to the national team in 2015.

On 30 September 2018, Poland, including Schulz, won their third World Champions title. Poland beat Brazil in the final (3–0) and defended the title from 2014.

== Honours ==
=== Club ===
- Domestic
  - 2014–15 Polish Cup, with Trefl Gdańsk
  - 2015–16 Polish SuperCup, with Trefl Gdańsk
  - 2017–18 Polish Cup, with Trefl Gdańsk

=== Individual awards ===
- 2018: Polish Cup – Most valuable player

=== State awards ===
- 2018: Gold Cross of Merit
