= Mateusz Mika =

Polish volleyball player (born 1991)

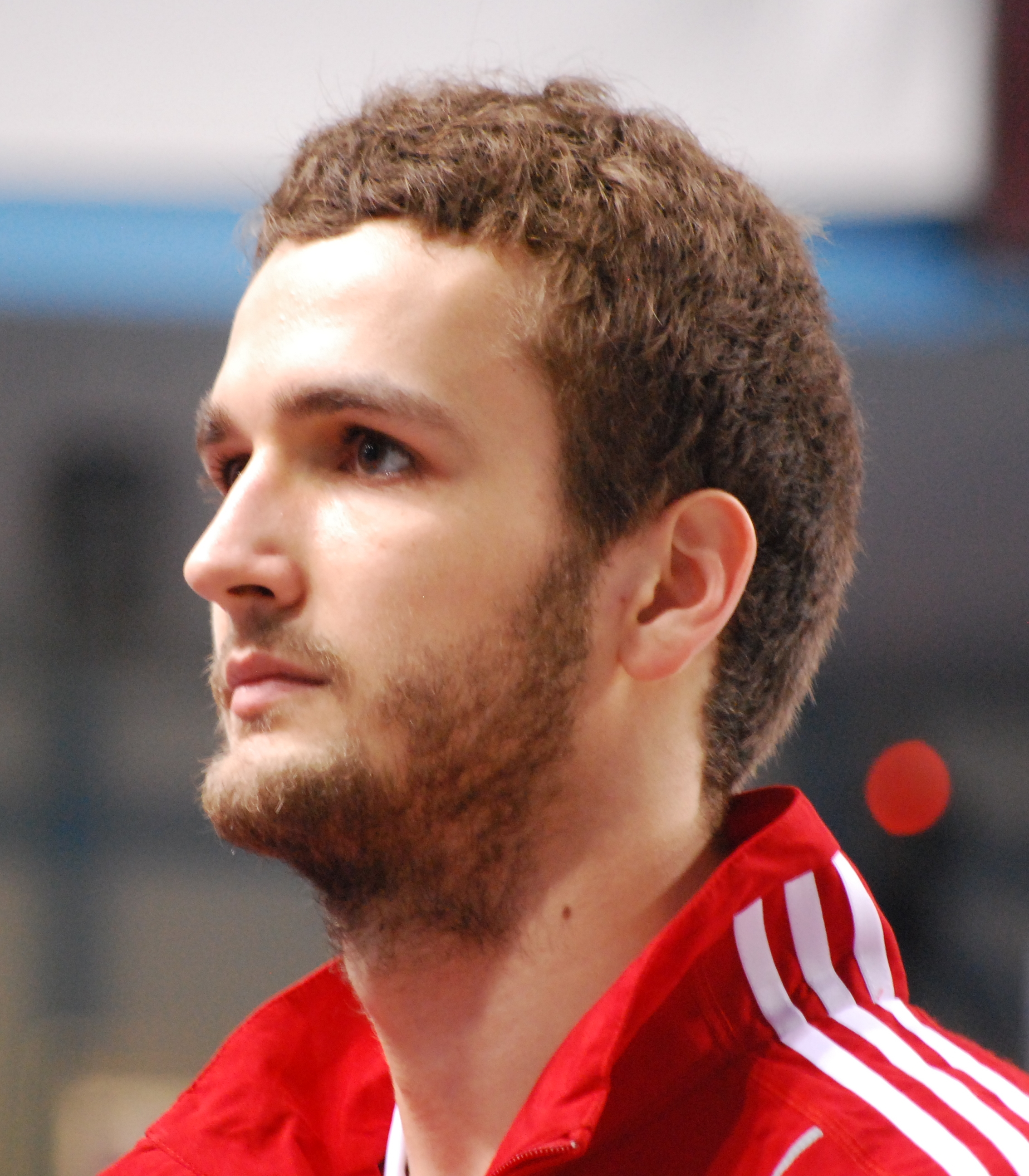

Personal information
- Full name: Mateusz Włodzimierz Mika
- Born: 21 January 1991 (age 35); Kobiernice, Poland
- Height: 2.06 m (6 ft 9 in)
- Weight: 91 kg (201 lb)
- Spike: 352 cm (139 in)

Volleyball information
- Position: Outside hitter

Career
Years	Teams
2009–2012; 2012–2013; 2013–2014; 2014–2018; 2018–2019; 2019–2020; 2020–2022; 2022–2023; 2023	Asseco Resovia; Trefl Gdańsk; Montpellier UC; Trefl Gdańsk; Asseco Resovia; AZS Olsztyn; Trefl Gdańsk; Türşad; Skra Bełchatów

National team
2010–2017	Poland (91)
Honours
Men's volleyball
Representing Poland
FIVB World Championship
Gold medal – first place	2014 Poland
FIVB World Cup
Bronze medal – third place	2015 Japan
CEV European Championship
Bronze medal – third place	2011 Austria/Czech Republic

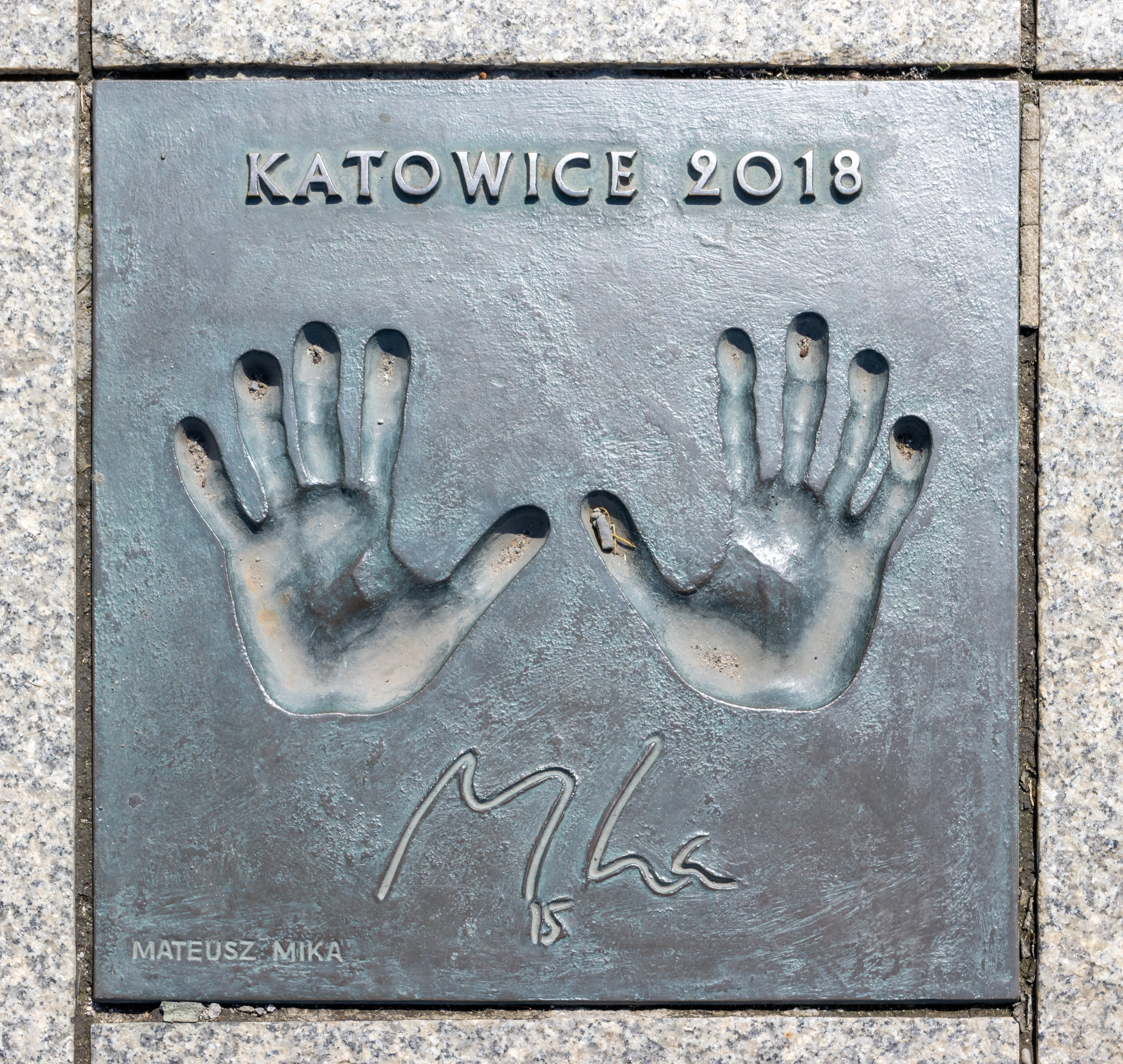
Hand prints and signature at the Avenue of Volleyball Stars, Katowice

Mateusz Włodzimierz Mika (born 21 January 1991) is a Polish professional volleyball player who plays as an outside hitter. He is a former member of the Poland national team, a participant in the Olympic Games Rio 2016 and the 2014 World Champion.

== Career ==
=== Club ===
In 2012 Mika joined Lotos Trefl Gdańsk. In the season 2013/2014 he was playing for the French club – Montpellier UC. On 12 June 2014 he came back to Gdańsk and signed a contract with Lotos Trefl Gdańsk. On 19 April 2015 Lotos Trefl Gdańsk, including Mika, won the Polish Cup. He was named the Most Valuable Player of the tournament. During the same season he won a silver medal of the Polish Championship. In April 2015 he signed a new two–year contract with the club.

=== National team ===
He debuted in the Poland men's national volleyball team on 29 May 2010 in a friendly match with France. In 2011 he was a member of the Polish team coached by Andrea Anastasi at the 2011 CEV European Championship, where Poland managed to win a bronze medal. In 2014 he was appointed to the Polish team by a head coach of that time – Stéphane Antiga at the 2014 FIVB World League. Initially, he was supposed to be a reserve player during the matches in Brazil, but after a few victories (among others, the won match against Brazil on 30 May 2014) he has become a main favorite to play at the 2014 FIVB World Championship. On 16 August 2014 he was appointed to the squad at the 2014 FIVB World Championship held in Poland. On 21 September 2014 the Polish team won the title of World Champion 2014. On 27 October 2014 he received a state award granted by the Polish President, Bronisław Komorowski – Gold Cross of Merit for outstanding sports achievements and worldwide promotion of Poland.

== Honours ==
=== Club ===
- CEV Cup
  - 2011–12 – with Asseco Resovia
- Domestic
  - 2011–12 Polish Championship, with Asseco Resovia
  - 2014–15 Polish Cup, with Trefl Gdańsk
  - 2015–16 Polish SuperCup, with Trefl Gdańsk
  - 2017–18 Polish Cup, with Trefl Gdańsk

=== Youth national team ===
- 2007 CEV U19 European Championship

=== Individual awards ===
- 2015: Polish Cup – Most valuable player
- 2015: Polish SuperCup – Most valuable player
- 2018: Polish Cup – Best receiver

=== State awards ===
- 2014: Gold Cross of Merit
