= Piotr Gacek =

Polish volleyball player (born 1978)

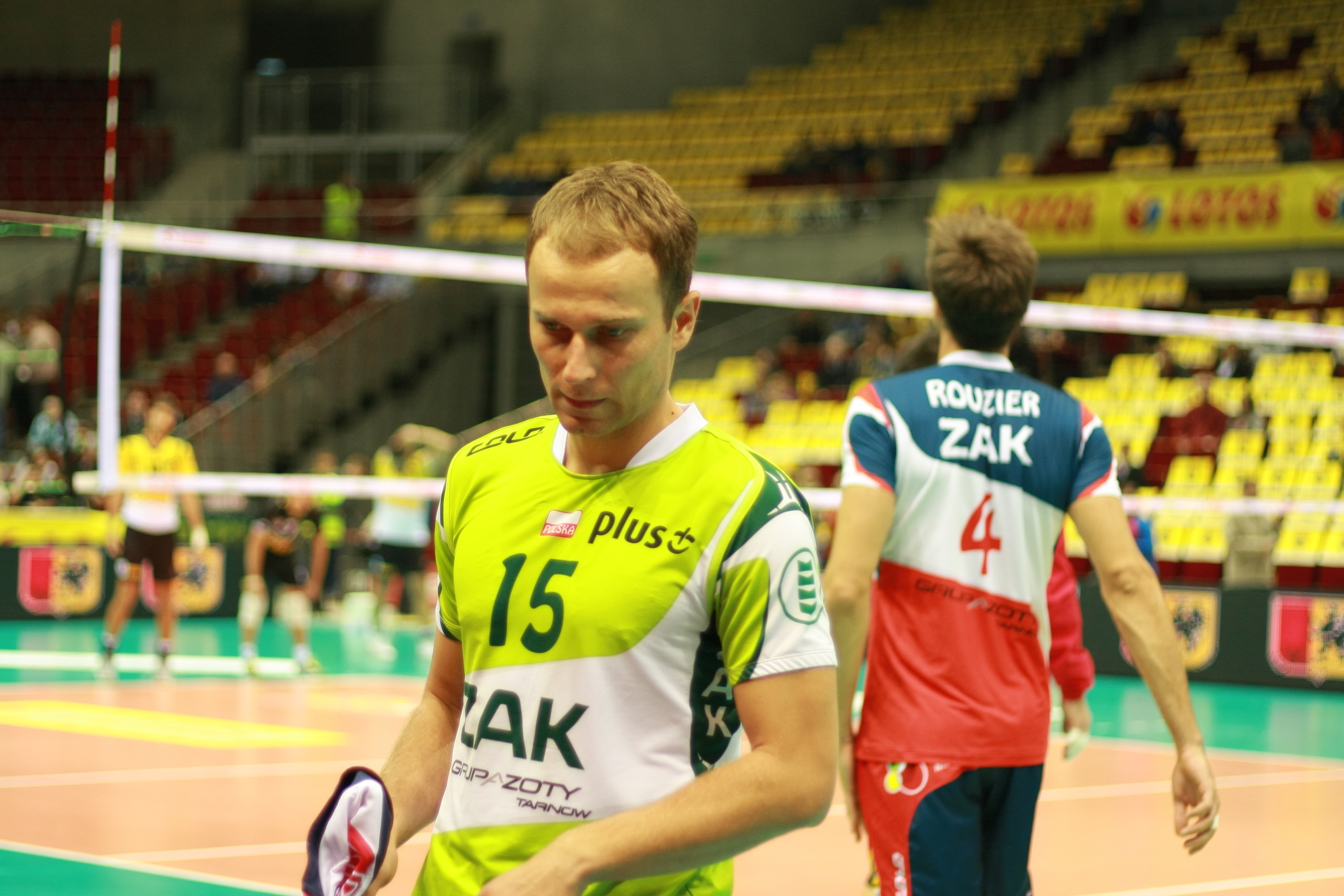
- Gacek in 2012

Personal information
- Full name: Piotr Marcin Gacek
- Born: 16 September 1978 (age 48); Grodków, Poland
- Hometown: 1.85 m

Volleyball information
- Position: Libero

Career
Years	Teams
1998–2002; 2002–2003; 2003–2004; 2004–2008; 2008–2010; 2010–2014; 2014–2017	AZS Opole; GTPS Gorzów Wielkopolski; Stal Nysa; AZS Częstochowa; Skra Bełchatów; ZAKSA Kędzierzyn-Koźle; Trefl Gdańsk

National team
2005–2016	Poland (114)
Honours
Men's volleyball
Representing Poland
FIVB World Championship
Silver medal – second place	2006 Japan
FIVB World Cup
Bronze medal – third place	2015 Japan
CEV European Championship
Gold medal – first place	2009 Turkey

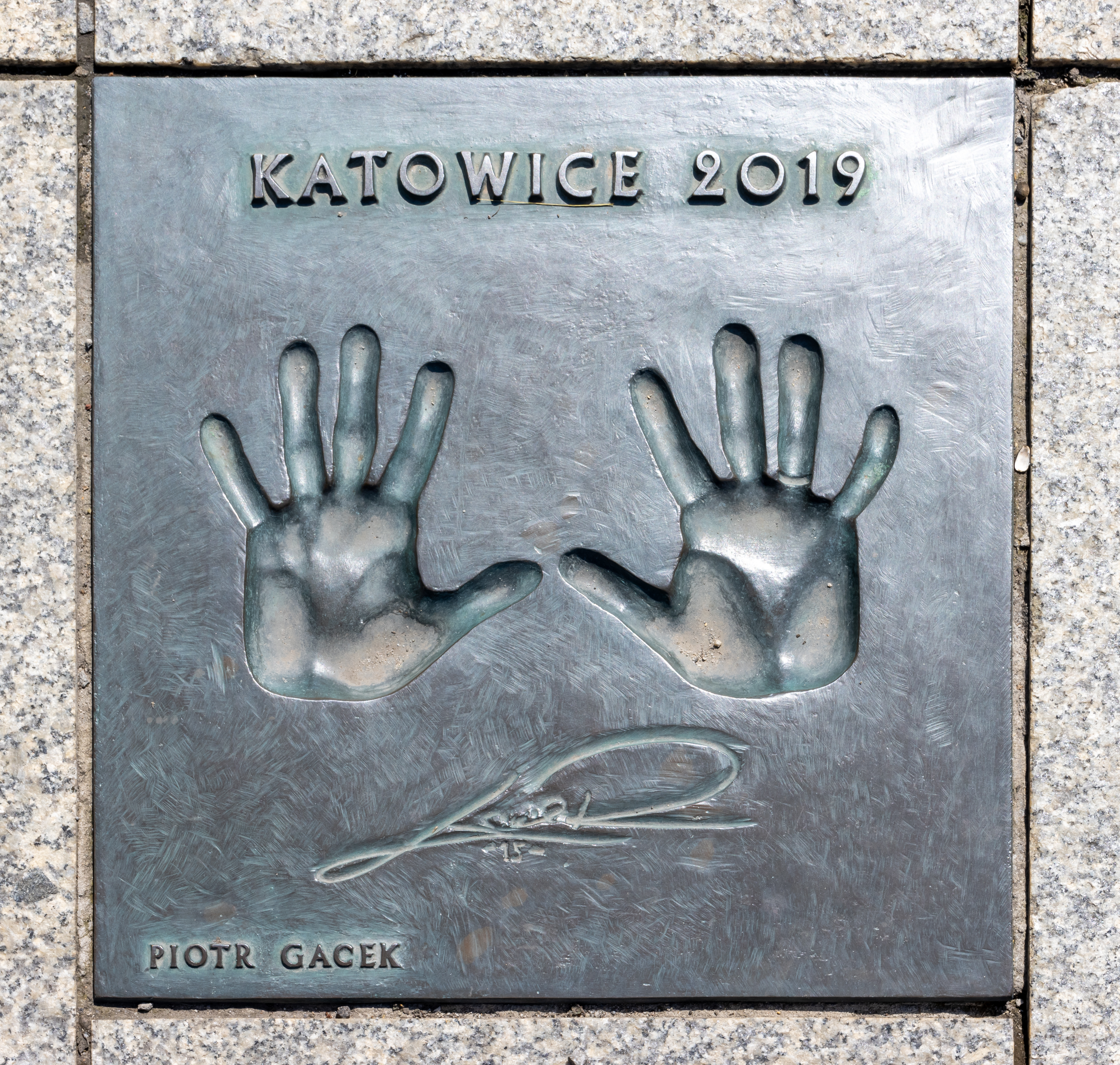
Hand prints and signature at the Avenue of Volleyball Stars, Katowice

Piotr Marcin Gacek (born 16 September 1978) is a former Polish volleyball player, member of the Poland men's national volleyball team in 2005–2010 and 2015–2016, 2009 European Champion, silver medallist of the 2006 World Championship, two–time Polish Champion (2009, 2010).

== Personal life ==
Gacek was born in Grodków, Poland. Married twice, his first wife was Agata. On September 27, 2008 he married Karolina. In August 2010 his wife gave birth to their daughter Zofia.

== Career ==
=== Clubs ===
His first professional club was SKS Mechanik Nysa and then he played for PGE Skra Bełchatów. With the club from Bełchatów he achieved the titles of Polish Champion (2009, 2010). In 2010-2014 he played for Polish club ZAKSA Kędzierzyn-Koźle. He won with this club from Kędzierzyn-Koźle the silver medal of CEV Cup 2011, silver (2011), bronze medal (2012) of Polish Championships and two Polish Cups in 2013 and 2014. In 2014 he moved to LOTOS Trefl Gdańsk. On April 19, 2015 LOTOS Trefl Gdańsk, including Gacek, achieved the Polish Cup 2015. Then he won silver medal of the Polish Championship. In May 2015 he signed a two-year contract with LOTOS Trefl Gdańsk.

Gacek ended up sporting career on April 13, 2017 after last match of the 2016–17 PlusLiga at Ergo Arena. He was chosen Most Valuable Player of the match with Cerrad Czarni Radom.

=== National team ===
Piotr Gacek was in the Polish squad when the Polish national team won the gold medal of the European Championship 2009. On September 14, 2009 he was awarded Knight's Cross of Polonia Restituta.

He announced his retirement from national team on June 5, 2016. On August 26, 2017, before the match Poland – Finland at the 2017 European Championship in Ergo Arena, Gdańsk, was held a brief ceremony to thank him for career in national team. He played 114 matches in Polish national team.

== Honours ==
- CEV Cup
  - 2010–11 – with ZAKSA Kędzierzyn-Koźle
- Domestic
  - 2007–08 Polish Cup, with AZS Częstochowa
  - 2008–09 Polish Cup, with PGE Skra Bełchatów
  - 2008–09 Polish Championship, with PGE Skra Bełchatów
  - 2009–10 Polish Championship, with PGE Skra Bełchatów
  - 2012–13 Polish Cup, with ZAKSA Kędzierzyn-Koźle
  - 2013–14 Polish Cup, with ZAKSA Kędzierzyn-Koźle
  - 2014–15 Polish Cup, with Lotos Trefl Gdańsk
  - 2015–16 Polish SuperCup, with Lotos Trefl Gdańsk

=== Individual awards ===
- 2006: Polish Championship – Best libero
- 2008: Polish Cup – Best defender
- 2009: Polish Cup – Best receiver
- 2013: Polish Cup – Best receiver
- 2015: Polish Cup – Best receiver

=== State awards ===
- 2006: Gold Cross of Merit
- 2009: Knight's Cross of Polonia Restituta
