= Murphy Troy =

American volleyball player (born 1989)

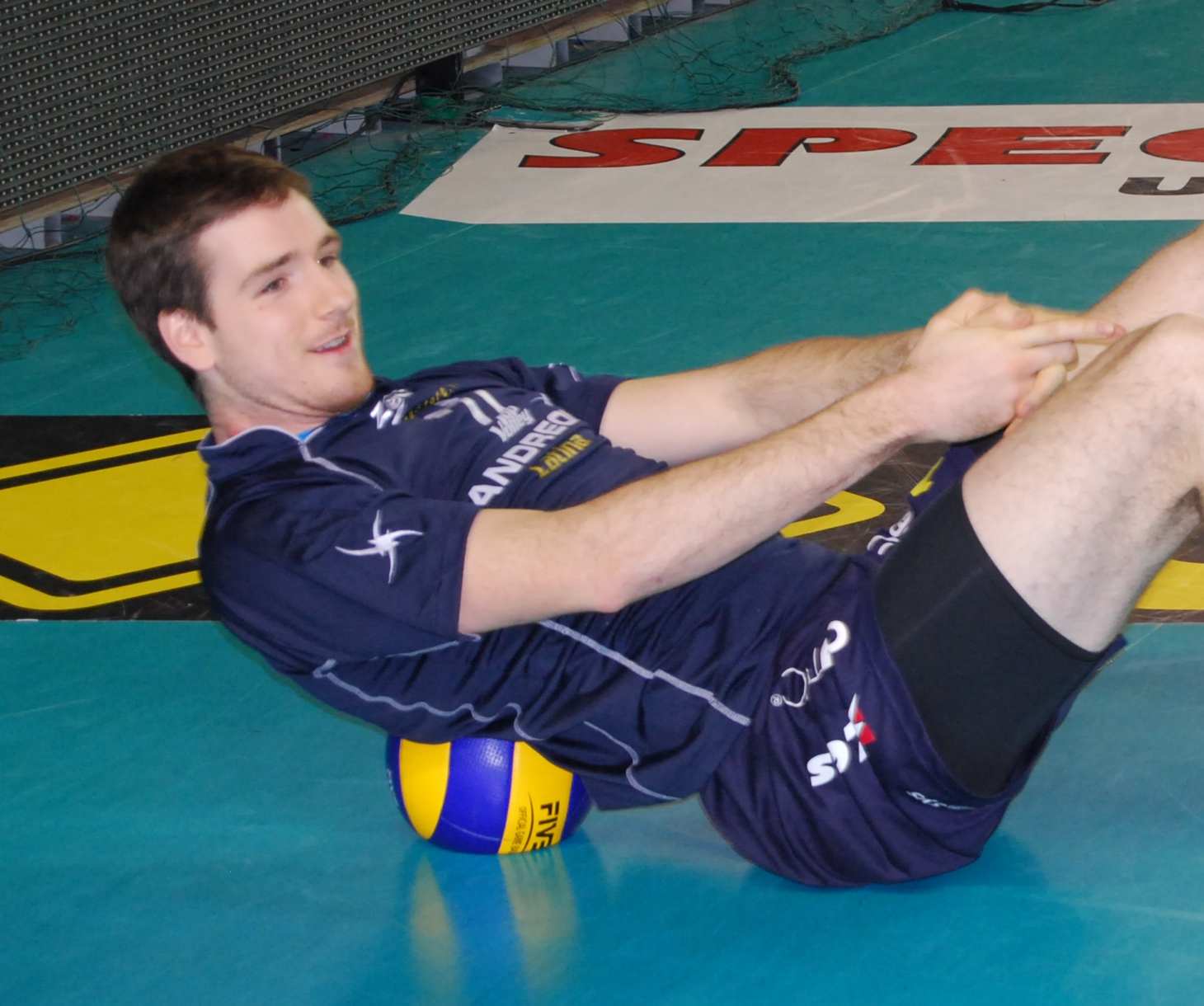

Personal information
- Full name: Murphy Edward Troy
- Nationality: American
- Born: May 31, 1989 (age 37); St. Louis, Missouri, U.S.
- Height: 6 ft 8 in (2.02 m)
- Weight: 218 lb (99 kg)
- Spike: 140 in (360 cm)
- Block: 140 in (350 cm)
- Education: University of Southern California

Volleyball information
- Position: Opposite
- Number: 11

Career
| Years | Teams |
|---|---|
| 2008–2011; 2011–2013; 2013–2014; 2014–2016 | USC Trojans; Andreoli Latina; Saint-Nazaire VBA; Lotos Trefl Gdańsk |

National team
| 2011–2016 | United States |
Medal record
Olympic Games
| Bronze medal – third place | 2016 Rio de Janeiro | Team |
World Cup
| Gold medal – first place | 2015 Japan |
World League
| Gold medal – first place | 2014 Florence |
| Bronze medal – third place | 2015 Rio de Janeiro |
NORCECA Championship
| Gold medal – first place | 2013 Canada |
Pan American Cup
| Gold medal – first place | 2012 Santo Domingo |
| Silver medal – second place | 2011 Gatineau |
NORCECA Champions Cup
| Silver medal – second place | 2015 Detroit |
- Last updated: 28 April 2021

Murphy Edward Troy (born May 31, 1989) is an American former volleyball player, a member of the United States men's national volleyball team, NORCECA Champion 2013, gold medalist of Pan-American Cup 2012 and World League 2014.

== Personal life ==
Murphy Troy married his long-time girlfriend Blair Tarnutzer on October 29, 2016 in La Quinta, California.

Troy enjoys visiting his sister Sarah "Sadie" Troy in Virginia, where she has worked as a Historical Interpreter at Thomas Jefferson's Monticello since 2014.

== Career ==
=== Clubs ===
In 2014 Troy moved from France to Polish club Lotos Trefl Gdańsk. On April 19, 2015 he achieved Polish Cup, which is first trophy of Lotos Trefl Gdańsk in history of club. He was awarded a title of Best Server of tournament. Then he won with Polish club silver medal of Polish Championship. In May 2015 signed new one-year contract with Lotos Trefl Gdańsk. Troy left Gdańsk in 2016. He announced his retirement on June 1, 2017.

=== National team ===
In 2014 American national team, including Troy, won gold medal of the World League.

== Sporting achievements ==
=== Clubs ===
==== National championships ====
- 2014/2015 Polish Cup, with Lotos Trefl Gdańsk
- 2014/2015 Polish Championship, with Lotos Trefl Gdańsk
- 2015/2016 Polish SuperCup 2015, with Lotos Trefl Gdańsk

=== National team ===
- 2011 Pan-American Cup
- 2012 Pan-American Cup
- 2013 NORCECA Championship
- 2014 FIVB World League
- 2015 NORCECA Champions Cup
- 2015 FIVB World League
- 2015 FIVB World Cup
- 2016 Olympic Games

=== Individual ===
- 2011 AVCA National Player of the Year
- 2015 Polish Cup – Best Server
- 2014/2015 Plus Liga – Top Scorer
