= Piotr Nowakowski =

Polish volleyball player

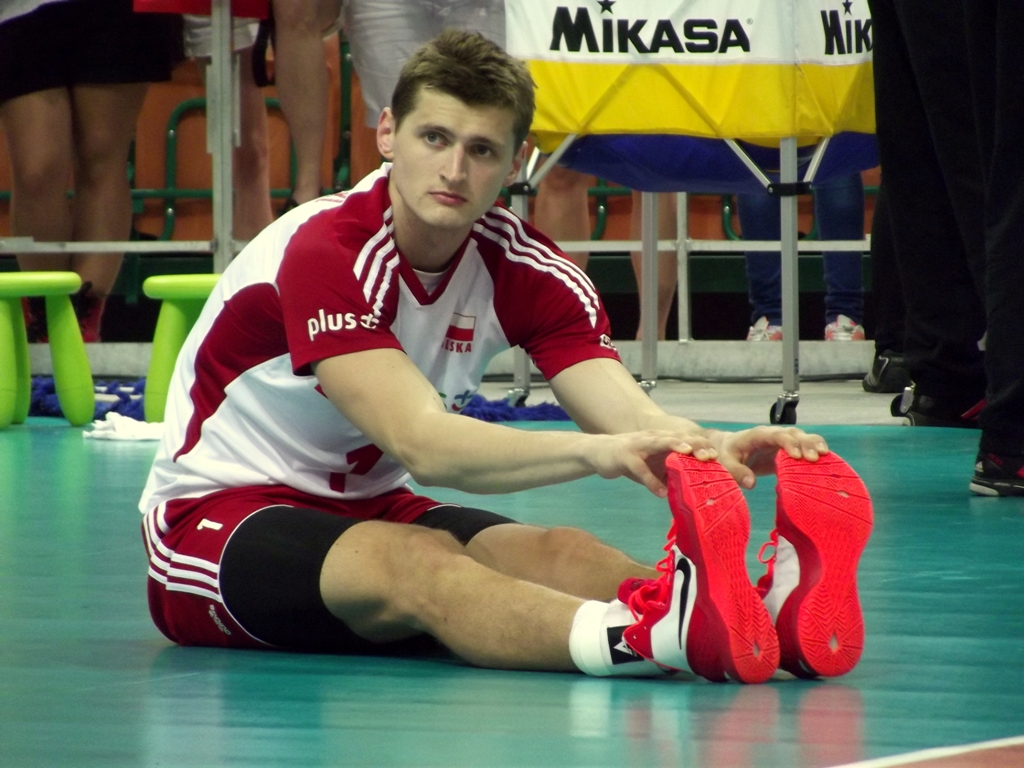

Personal information
- Nickname: Cichy Pit
- Born: 18 December 1987 (age 38); Żyrardów, Poland
- Height: 2.05 m (6 ft 9 in)
- Weight: 103 kg (227 lb)
- Spike: 368 cm (145 in)
- Block: 340 cm (134 in)

Volleyball information
- Position: Middle blocker
- Current club: Trefl Gdańsk
- Number: 1

Career
Years	Teams
2006–2011; 2011–2017; 2017–2019; 2019–2024; 2025–	AZS Częstochowa; Asseco Resovia; Trefl Gdańsk; Projekt Warsaw; Trefl Gdańsk

National team
2008–2021	Poland (230)
Honours
Men's volleyball
Representing Poland
FIVB World Championship
Gold medal – first place	2014 Poland
Gold medal – first place	2018 Bulgaria/Italy
FIVB World Cup
Silver medal – second place	2011 Japan
Bronze medal – third place	2015 Japan
FIVB World League
Gold medal – first place	2012 Sofia
Bronze medal – third place	2011 Gdańsk
FIVB Nations League
Silver medal – second place	2021 Rimini
CEV European Championship
Gold medal – first place	2009 Turkey
Bronze medal – third place	2011 Austria/Czech Republic
Bronze medal – third place	2019 Belgium/France/Netherlands/Slovenia
Bronze medal – third place	2021 Poland/Czechia/Estonia/Finland

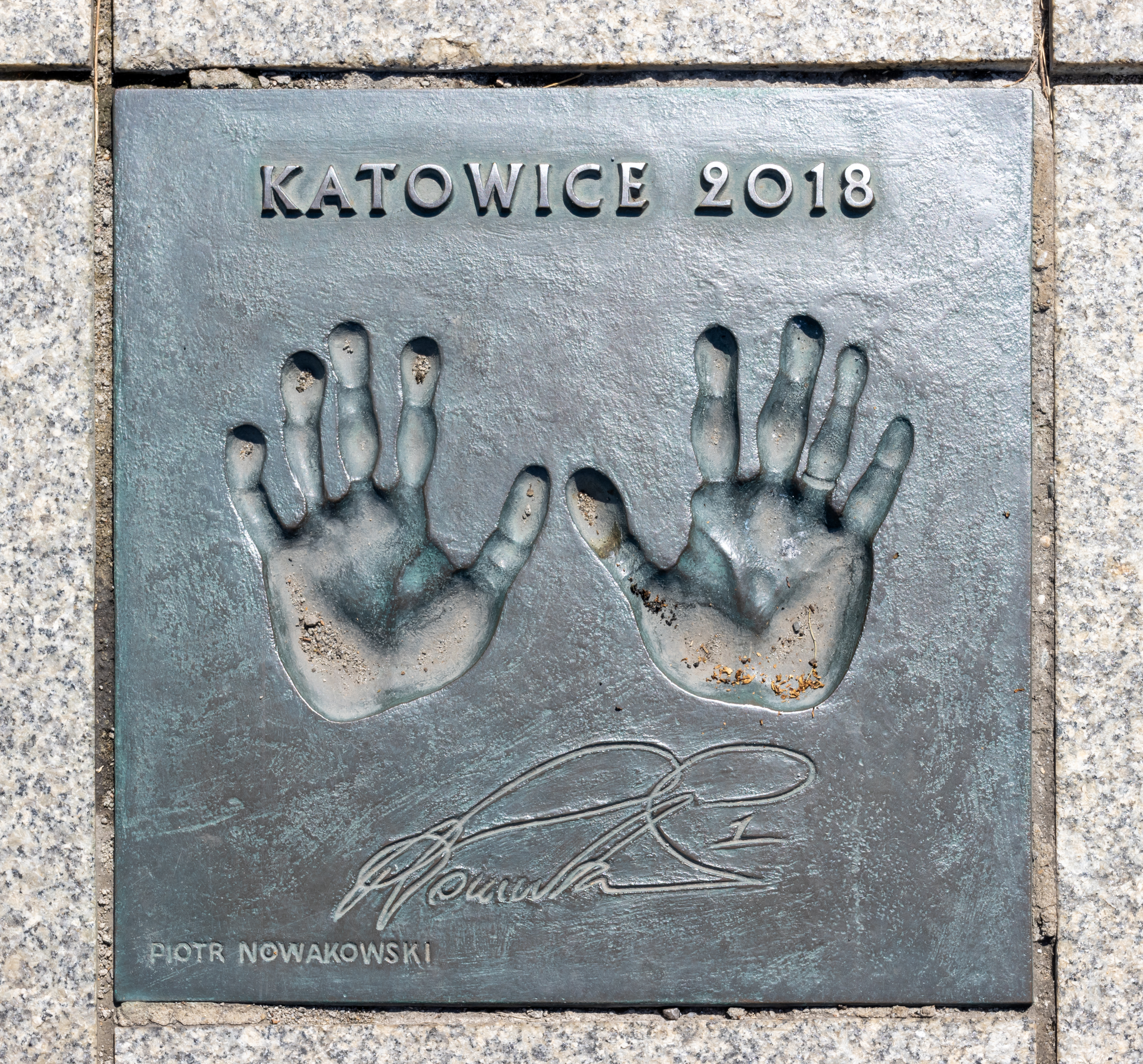
Hand prints and signature at the Avenue of Volleyball Stars, Katowice

Piotr Nowakowski (born 18 December 1987) is a Polish professional volleyball player who plays as a middle blocker for Trefl Gdańsk. He is a former member of the Poland national team, a participant in 3 Olympic Games (London 2012, Rio 2016, Tokyo 2020), two–time World Champion (2014, 2018), 2009 European Champion, and the 2012 World League winner.

== Personal life ==
Nowakowski was born in Żyrardów, but he grew up in Międzyborów. On July 25, 2015 he married Aleksandra Wilczewska. On January 1, 2017 he announced that he and his wife are expecting a first child. On June 12, 2017 his wife gave birth to their daughter Oliwia.

== Career ==
=== Club ===
He made his debut in PlusLiga for club AZS Częstochowa. In the season 2007/2008 he became a key player for the team, and they won the Polish Cup and the silver medal in the Polish Championship. In 2011, he moved to Asseco Resovia Rzeszów. In 2012 he won silver medal in the CEV Cup 2012. In 2012 after seven years of domination by PGE Skra Bełchatów, he was part of the Asseco Resovia Rzeszów team that won the Polish Championship. The next year he and his team repeated this success and gained the title of Polish Champions 2013. In the 2013/2014 season, they won the Polish SuperCup 2013 and the silver medal in the Polish Championship 2013/2014 after losing the final (0-3 in matches) against PGE Skra Bełchatów. On March 29, 2015 Asseco Resovia Rzeszów, including Nowakowski, won the silver medal in the 2014–15 CEV Champions League. He was named the Best Middle Blocker of the Final Four of the 2014–15 CEV Champions League. In April 2015 he signed a contract for the next two years, keeping him at Asseco Resovia Rzeszów till 2017. In April 2015 he achieved his third Polish Championship with Resovia. On April 28, 2017 he moved to LOTOS Trefl Gdańsk.

=== National team ===
Nowakowski was in the Polish squad when the Polish national team won the gold medal at the 2009 European Championship. On September 14, 2009 he was awarded the Knight's Cross of Polonia Restituta. The Order was conferred on the following day by the Prime Minister of Poland, Donald Tusk. On July 10, 2011 Nowakowski, with the national team, won the first medal of the World League for Poland in history. They won a bronze medal after winning the match with Argentina. Then Poland played at the European Championship 2011, where they had to defend the title of European Champion. Nowakowski was a major player in the team and Polish national team won a second medal in 2011 - a bronze after winning match with Russia. In November 2011 Poland won a silver medal at the World Cup and therefore qualified for the 2012 Olympic Games. On July 8, 2012 the Polish team won gold medal of the World League 2012. Nowakowski was a main player of the Polish team at the Olympic Games London 2012, but Poland lost a quarterfinal with Russia. On August 16, 2014 he was named in the World Championship squad for the World Championship held in Poland. On September 21, 2014 the Polish team won the title of World Champion 2014. On October 27, 2014, he received a state award granted by the Polish President, Bronisław Komorowski: the Officer's Cross of Polonia Restituta for outstanding sports achievements and worldwide promotion of Poland.

On September 30, 2018 Poland achieved title of the 2018 World Champion. Poland beat Brazil in the final 3-0 and defended the title from 2014. Nowakowski received an individual award for the Best Middle Blocker.

== Honours ==
=== Club ===
- CEV Champions League
  - 2014–15 – with Asseco Resovia
- CEV Cup
  - 2011–12 – with Asseco Resovia
- CEV Challenge Cup
  - 2023–24 – with Projekt Warsaw
- Domestic
  - 2007–08 Polish Cup, with AZS Częstochowa
  - 2011–12 Polish Championship, with Asseco Resovia
  - 2012–13 Polish Championship, with Asseco Resovia
  - 2013–14 Polish SuperCup, with Asseco Resovia
  - 2014–15 Polish Championship, with Asseco Resovia
  - 2017–18 Polish Cup, with Trefl Gdańsk

=== Individual awards ===
- 2015: Polish Cup – Best blocker
- 2015: CEV Champions League – Best middle blocker
- 2018: Polish Cup – Best server
- 2018: FIVB World Championship – Best middle blocker
- 2021: CEV European Championship – Best middle blocker

=== State awards ===
- 2009: Knight's Cross of Polonia Restituta
- 2014: Officer's Cross of Polonia Restituta
- 2018: Commander's Cross of Polonia Restituta

=== Statistics ===
- 2010–11 PlusLiga – Best blocker (96 blocks)
- 2020–21 PlusLiga – Best blocker (98 blocks)
