= Andrea Anastasi =

Italian volleyball player

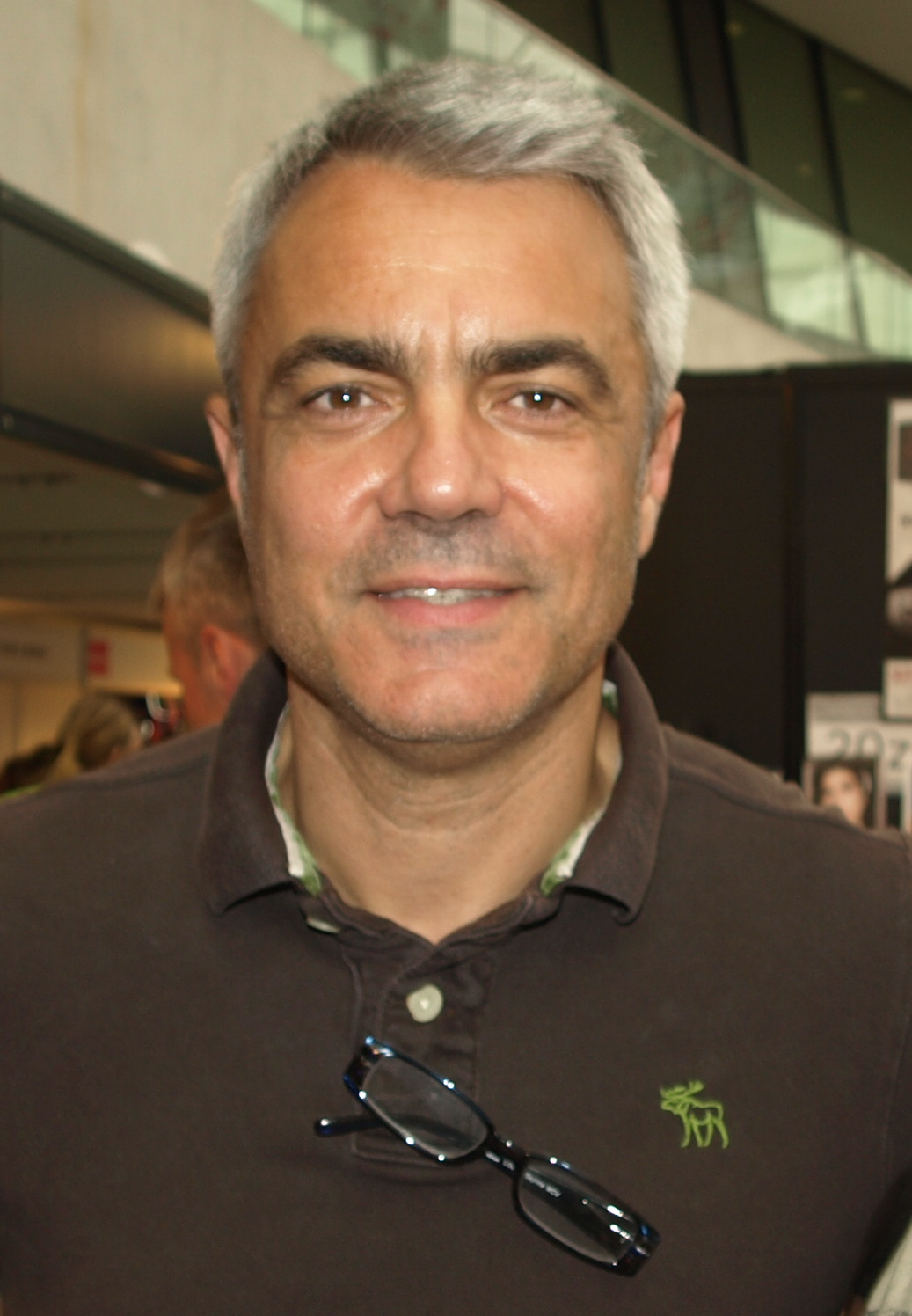
- Anastasi in 2013

Personal information
- Nickname: Nano
- Born: 8 October 1960 (age 66); Poggio Rusco, Italy
- Height: 1.83 m (6 ft 0 in)

Coaching information
- Current team: Berlin Recycling Volleys
Previous teams coached
Years	Teams
1994–1995; 1995–1999; 1999–2003; 2003–2005; 2005–2007; 2007–2010; 2011–2013; 2014–2019; 2018; 2019–2022; 2022–2023; 2023–2025; 2026–	Pallavolo Brescia; Gabeca Pallavolo; Italy; Piemonte Volley; Spain; Italy; Poland; Trefl Gdańsk; Belgium; Projekt Warsaw; Sir Safety Perugia; Gas Sales Piacenza; Berlin Recycling Volleys

Volleyball information
- Position: Outside hitter
- Number: 7

Career
Years	Teams
1977–1980; 1980–1983; 1983–1987; 1987–1991; 1991–1992; 1992–1993	Pallavolo Parma; Panini Modena; Kutiba Falconara; Sisley Treviso; Jockey Fas Schio; Gallo Gioia Del Colle

National team
1981–1991	Italy (141)
Honours
Men's volleyball
Representing Italy
FIVB World Championship
Gold medal – first place	1990 Brazil
FIVB World League
Gold medal – first place	1990 Osaka
Gold medal – first place	1991 Milan
CEV European Championship
Gold medal – first place	1989 Sweden
Head coach Italy
Olympic Games
Bronze medal – third place	2000 Sydney
FIVB World League
Gold medal – first place	1999 Mar del Plata
Gold medal – first place	2000 Rotterdam
Silver medal – second place	2001 Katowice
Bronze medal – third place	2003 Madrid
CEV European Championship
Gold medal – first place	1999 Austria
Gold medal – first place	2003 Germany
Silver medal – second place	2001 Czech Republic
Head coach Spain
CEV European Championship
Gold medal – first place	2007 Russia
Head coach Poland
FIVB World Cup
Silver medal – second place	2011 Japan
FIVB World League
Gold medal – first place	2012 Bulgaria
Bronze medal – third place	2011 Poland
CEV European Championship
Bronze medal – third place	2011 Austria/Czech Republic

Andrea Anastasi (born 8 October 1960) is an Italian professional volleyball coach and former player. He was a member of the Italy national team from 1981 to 1991, and during his career won the 1990 World Champion title. Since 2026, he has served as head coach for Berlin Recycling Volleys.

== Career ==
=== As a player ===
Anastasi played 141 matches for the Italian national team. Anastasi winning the gained 1990 World Championship, 1989 European Championship, gold medalist of the 1990 World League and 1991 World League with Azzurri. Anastasi at club level first team in the Parma from 1977 to 1980. He with Modena, Falconara and Treviso won three CEV Challenge Cup.

=== As a coach ===
Anastasi started profession as a head coach with Brescia in 1994. Then from 1995 to 1999 coached Montichiari at Serie A1. In 1999, he was chosen as head coach of Italy. He achieved many success with Italian national team. He led the team to double gold in 1999 during the 1999 European Championship and 1999 FIVB World League. In 2000 he repeated success and won World league, in addition the achieved bronze medal at the 2000 Summer Olympics. in final Italy against Argentina (3-0) to reach bronze medals. Anastasi in the third year gained with Italy two silver medals at 2001 FIVB World League and 2001 European Championship. At 2002 FIVB World Championship Italy took fifth place along with Poland and United States. In the last year of coaching Italy, Anastasi gained with them bronze medal of 2003 FIVB World League and gold medal of the 2003 European Championship.

From 2003 to 2005, he was employed in the Italian Serie A League. Piemonte took fourth place twice and won 2005 Italian Cup.

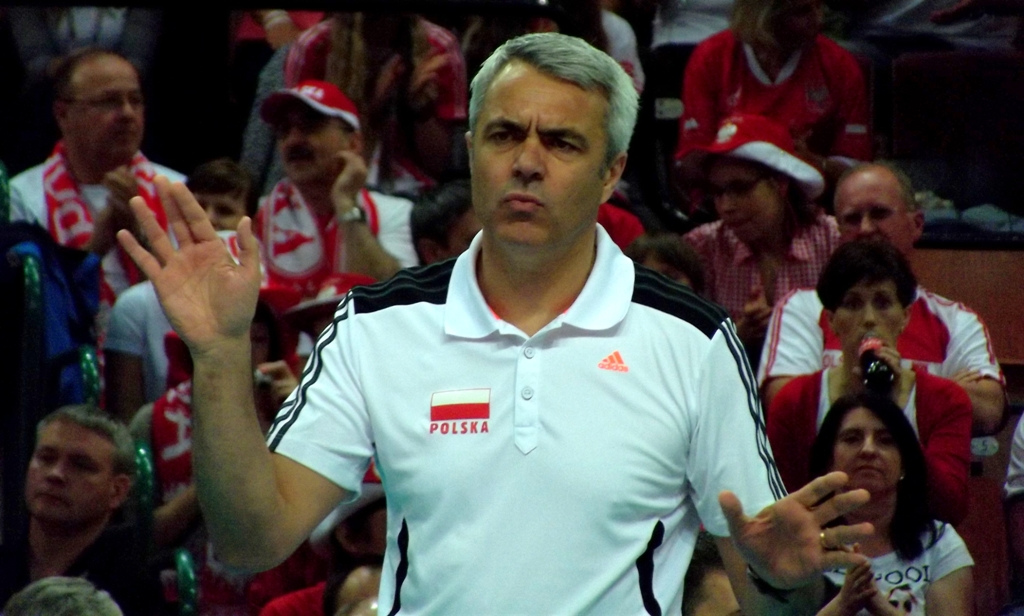
Anastasi as coach of Poland at the 2012 World League.

Then Anastasi moved to coaching Spain. In 2007 European Championship he led Spanish to historic title of European Champions held in Moscow. Spain beat hosts in the finale and made 15 victories in a row. Received Silver medal in Mediterranean Games his latest achievement.

In 2007 Anastasi came back to work with Italy. However, this time without many success (4th place at the 2008 Summer Olympics, 10th place at the European Championship and 4th place at the 2010 World Championship). He was fired in 2010.

Poland after bad year 2010 decided to change a head coach and squad. Andrea Anastasi began work as head coach on 23 February 2011, when Poland was ranked 11th in the FIVB ranking. His assistant was Andrea Gardini. 2011 was very successful for Anastasi and his team. On 10 July 2011 Poland won first medal of the World League in history. Then on 18 September 2011 Poland beat Russia (3–1) and achieved their second bronze in 2011. Polish national team qualified to the Olympics on 3 December 2011. Anastasi led Poland to silver medal of the 2011 FIVB World Cup. For the first time in the history Polish national team won three medals in one year. In next year, on 8 July 2012, won the final match of 2012 FIVB World League against United States (3-0). At 2012 Olympic Games his team took 5th place. In October 2013 Andrea Anastasi was fired as coach of the Polish national team. The reason for this decision were unsuccessful Polish losses in 2013 and getting worse team game. Poland, while working of Andrea Anastasi, took 3rd place in the FIVB World Rankings.

In June 2014, the Andrea Anastasi was officially presented as the Lotos Trefl Gdańsk new head coach. Team took 3rd place in regular season of PlusLiga and winner 2014–15 Polish Cup. His team won 19 and lost 7 matches. On 23 February 2015 Andrea Anastasi signed new two-years contract, because of good results in regular, season till 2017. LOTOS Trefl advanced to the final of 2014–15 PlusLiga after winning in semifinal. It was the first, historical promotion of LOTOS Trefl to the final of Polish Championship and Anastasi led the team to silver medal of 2015 Polish Championship.

On 14 March 2018 Anastasi extended his contract with Polish club Trefl Gdańsk and became a new head coach of Belgium.

== Honours ==
=== As a player ===
- CEV Challenge Cup
  - 1982–83 – with Panini Modena
  - 1985–86 – with Pallavolo Falconara
  - 1990–91 – with Sisley Treviso

=== As a coach ===
- FIVB Club World Championship
  - Betim 2022 – with Sir Safety Perugia
- Domestic
  - 2014–15 Polish Cup, with Lotos Trefl Gdańsk
  - 2015–16 Polish SuperCup, with Lotos Trefl Gdańsk
  - 2017–18 Polish Cup, with Lotos Trefl Gdańsk
  - 2022–23 Italian SuperCup, with Sir Safety Perugia

=== Individual awards ===
- 2000: Coach of the year in Italy
- 2011: Coach of the year in Poland
- 2012: Coach of the year in Poland
