= MKS Będzin =

Polish volleyball club

- Full name: Nowak-Mosty MKS Będzin
- Founded: 2005
- Ground: Będzin Arena ul. Sportowa 4; 42–500 Będzin (Capacity: 2,500)
- Chairman: Kamil Kowal
- Manager: Dawid Murek
- 2024–25: 16th place
- Website: Club home page

Uniforms
Home	Away

MKS Będzin SA, officially known for sponsorship reasons as Nowak-Mosty MKS Będzin, is a Polish professional men's volleyball club based in Będzin, founded in 2005.

== Team ==
As of 2024–25 season

=== Coaching staff ===
Occupation	Name
Head coach	(Poland) Dawid Murek
Assistant coach	(Poland) Radosław Kolanek

=== Players ===
No.	Name	Date of birth	Position
1	(Poland) Adrian Kopij	January 16, 1996 (age 29)	outside hitter
2	(Poland) Patryk Szwaradzki	June 27, 1995 (age 30)	opposite
4	(Poland) Filip Popiwczak	October 10, 2005 (age 20)	libero
6	(Poland) Artur Ratajczak	September 18, 1990 (age 35)	middle blocker
7	(Poland) Mateusz Siwicki	July 23, 1996 (age 29)	middle blocker
10	(Serbia) Luka Tadić	October 10, 2000 (age 25)	outside hitter
12	(Poland) Grzegorz Pająk	January 1, 1987 (age 38)	setter
13	(Poland) Dominik Depowski	October 27, 1995 (age 29)	outside hitter
14	(Poland) Maciej Olenderek	October 16, 1992 (age 32)	libero
17	(Canada) Brandon Koppers	September 9, 1995 (age 30)	outside hitter
18	(Poland) Damian Schulz	February 26, 1990 (age 35)	opposite
20	(Poland) Bartłomiej Wójcik	July 24, 1998 (age 27)	middle blocker
21	(Poland) Mateusz Szpernalowski	February 11, 2005 (age 20)	setter
33	(Ukraine) Valerii Todua	July 30, 1992 (age 33)	middle blocker

== See also ==
- MKS Będzin players
- MKS Będzin coaches
