= 2017–18 Polish Men's Volleyball Cup =

2017–18 Polish Volleyball Cup
- Sport: Volleyball
- Duration: 27–28 January 2018
- TV partner: Polsat Sport

Finals
- Champions: Trefl Gdańsk (2nd title)
- Finals MVP: Damian Schulz (POL)

Seasons
- ← 2016–17 2018–19 →

The 2017–18 Polish Cup was the 61st edition of the Polish Volleyball Cup tournament.

Trefl Gdańsk beat PGE Skra Bełchatów in the final (3–0) and won the Polish Cup for the second time in club history.

== Final four ==
- Venue: Hala Stulecia, Wrocław
- All times are Central European Time (UTC+01:00).

Semifinals
27 January
ZAKSA Kędzierzyn-Koźle	1
Trefl Gdańsk	3
27 January
PGE Skra Bełchatów	3
Onico Warsaw	0

Final
28 January
Trefl Gdańsk	3
PGE Skra Bełchatów	0

=== Semifinals ===
Date	Time		Score		Set 1	Set 2	Set 3	Set 4	Set 5	Total	Report
27 Jan	14:45	ZAKSA Kędzierzyn-Koźle	1–3	Trefl Gdańsk	25–19	23–25	23–25	23–25		94–94	Report
27 Jan	17:30	PGE Skra Bełchatów	3–0	Onico Warsaw	25–19	25–19	26–24			76–62	Report

=== Final ===
Date	Time		Score		Set 1	Set 2	Set 3	Set 4	Set 5	Total	Report
28 Jan	14:45	Trefl Gdańsk	3–0	PGE Skra Bełchatów	25–21	25–22	25–22			75–65	Report

== Final standings ==
Qualified for the 2018 Polish SuperCup

Rank	Team
1st place, gold medalist(s)	Trefl Gdańsk
2	PGE Skra Bełchatów
Semifinalists	Onico Warsaw; ZAKSA Kędzierzyn-Koźle

2017–18 Polish Cup winners
Trefl Gdańsk
2nd title

== Awards ==
- Most valuable player

(Poland) Damian Schulz (Trefl Gdańsk)

- Best server

(Poland) Piotr Nowakowski (Trefl Gdańsk)

- Best receiver

(Poland) Mateusz Mika (Trefl Gdańsk)

- Best defender

(Poland) Fabian Majcherski (Trefl Gdańsk)

- Best blocker

(Serbia) Srećko Lisinac (PGE Skra Bełchatów)

- Best opposite

(Poland) Artur Szalpuk (Trefl Gdańsk)

- Best setter

(Poland) Marcin Janusz (PGE Skra Bełchatów)

== See also ==
- 2017–18 PlusLiga
