= 2014–15 Polish Men's Volleyball Cup =

2014–15 Polish Volleyball Cup
- Sport: Volleyball
- Duration: 18–19 April 2015
- TV partner: Polsat Sport

Finals
- Champions: Lotos Trefl Gdańsk (1st title)
- Finals MVP: Mateusz Mika (POL)

Seasons
- 2013–14 2015–16

The 2014–15 Polish Cup was the 58th edition of the Polish Volleyball Cup tournament.

Lotos Trefl Gdańsk won their first Polish Cup in club history after beating Asseco Resovia in the final (3–1).

== Final four ==
- Venue: Ergo Arena, Gdańsk/Sopot
- All times are Central European Summer Time (UTC+02:00).

Semifinals
18 April
PGE Skra Bełchatów	1
Lotos Trefl Gdańsk	3
18 April
Asseco Resovia	3
Jastrzębski Węgiel	1

Final
19 April
Lotos Trefl Gdańsk	3
Asseco Resovia	1

=== Semifinals ===
Date	Time		Score		Set 1	Set 2	Set 3	Set 4	Set 5	Total	Report
18 Apr	14:45	PGE Skra Bełchatów	1–3	Lotos Trefl Gdańsk	20–25	23–25	27–25	22–25		92–100	Report
18 Apr	17:30	Asseco Resovia	3–1	Jastrzębski Węgiel	19–25	25–18	25–20	25–22		94–85	Report

=== Final ===
Date	Time		Score		Set 1	Set 2	Set 3	Set 4	Set 5	Total	Report
19 Apr	13:30	Lotos Trefl Gdańsk	3–1	Asseco Resovia	25–22	21–25	25–21	25–23		96–91	Report

== Final standings ==
Qualified for the 2015 Polish SuperCup

Rank	Team
1st place, gold medalist(s)	Lotos Trefl Gdańsk
2	Asseco Resovia
Semifinalists	Jastrzębski Węgiel; PGE Skra Bełchatów

2014–15 Polish Cup winners
Lotos Trefl Gdańsk
1st title

== Awards ==
- Most valuable player

(Poland) Mateusz Mika (Lotos Trefl Gdańsk)

- Best server

(United States) Murphy Troy (Lotos Trefl Gdańsk)

- Best receiver

(Poland) Piotr Gacek (Lotos Trefl Gdańsk)

- Best defender

(Poland) Krzysztof Ignaczak (Asseco Resovia)

- Best blocker

(Poland) Piotr Nowakowski (Asseco Resovia)

- Best opposite spiker

(Germany) Jochen Schöps (Asseco Resovia)

- Best setter

(Poland) Fabian Drzyzga (Asseco Resovia)

== See also ==
- 2014–15 PlusLiga
