= Trefl Gdańsk =

Polish volleyball club

Energa Trefl Gdańsk
- Full name: Trefl Gdańsk Spółka Akcyjna
- Nickname: Gdańskie Lwy (The Gdańsk Lions)
- Founded: 2005; 21 years ago
- Ground: Ergo Arena (Capacity: 11,200)
- Chairman: Dariusz Gadomski
- Manager: Mariusz Sordyl
- Captain: Moustapha M'Baye
- League: Tauron Liga
- 2025–26: 9th place
- Website: Club home page

Uniforms
Home	Away

Trefl Gdańsk, officially known for sponsorship reasons as Energa Trefl Gdańsk, is a professional men's volleyball club based in Gdańsk in northern Poland. The club was founded in 2005 and promoted to Tauron Liga, the top flight of Polish volleyball in 2011 (then known as PlusLiga).

== Honours ==
- Polish Championship

Silver (1): 2014–15

- Polish Cup

Winners (2): 2014–15, 2017–18

- Polish SuperCup

Winners (1): 2015–16

== Club history ==
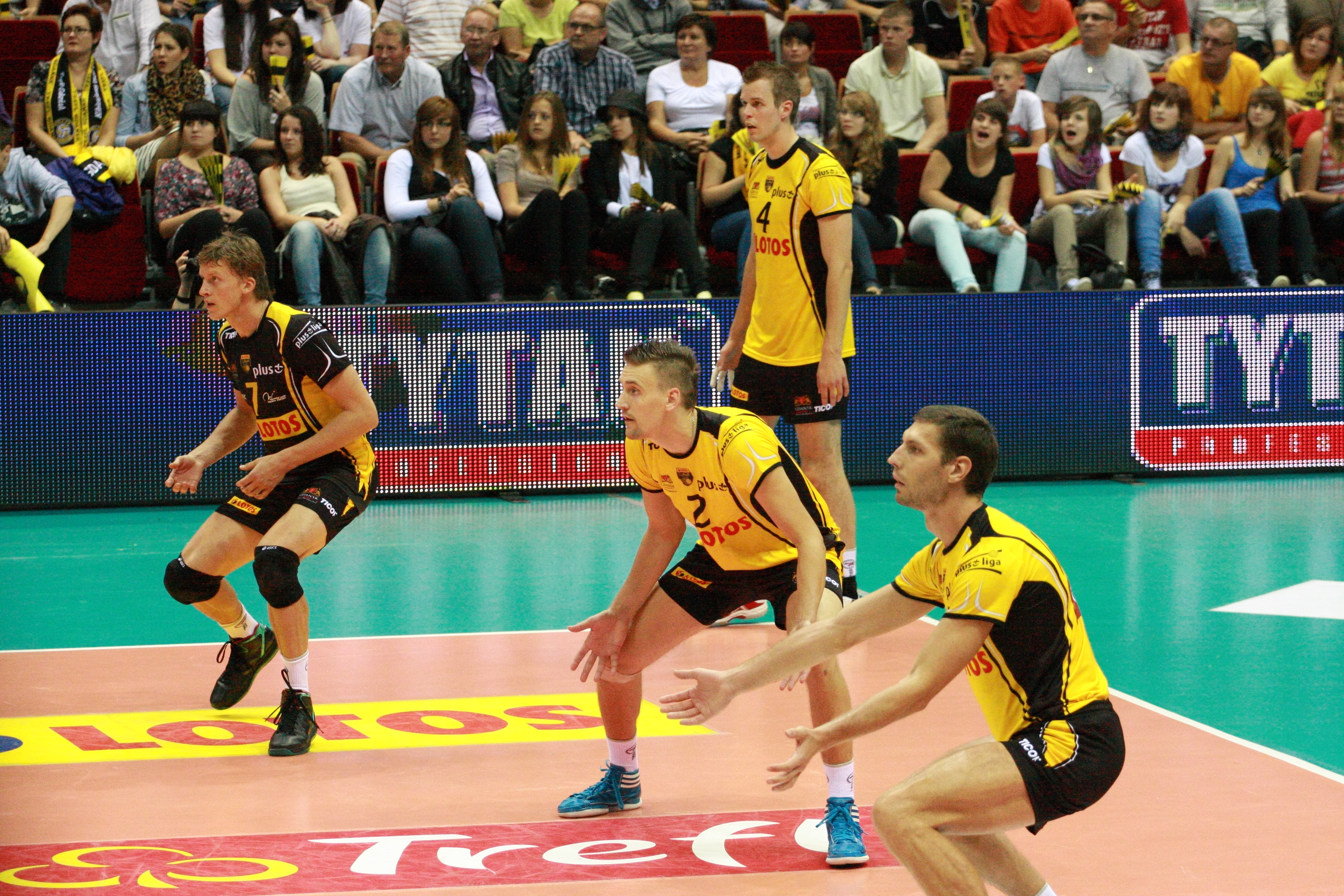
The team during a match with PGE Skra Bełchatów on 30 September 2011.

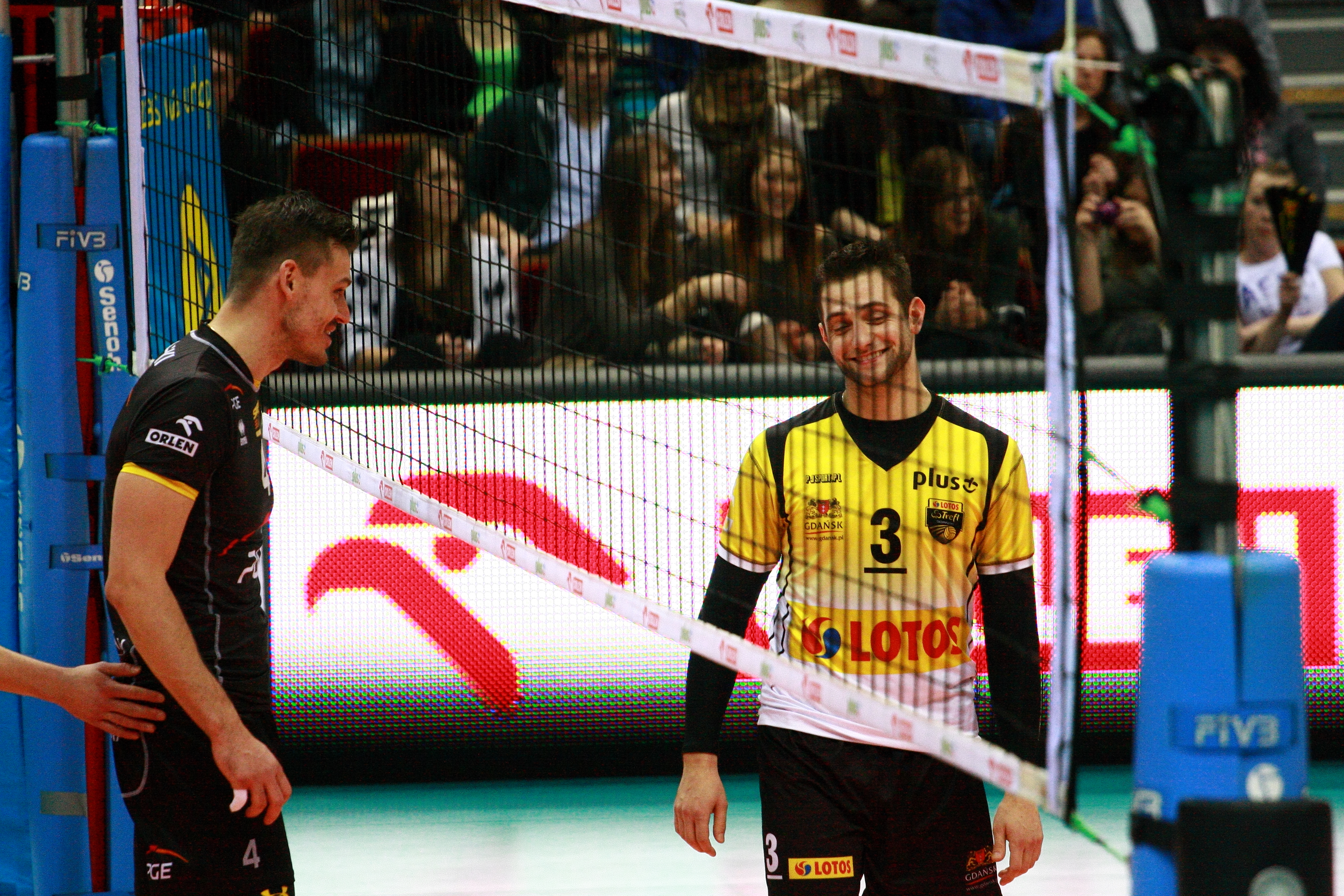
Daniel Pliński (#4) and Grzegorz Łomacz (#3) during a match, Lotos Trefl Gdańsk vs. PGE Skra Bełchatów in 2013.

Trefl Gdańsk was founded in 2005, and began its history in the 2nd Polish Volleyball League, playing there until 2007. The club was promoted to PlusLiga in 2008 after spending just one season in the 1st Polish Volleyball League. Unfortunately, Trefl did not manage to stay in the league for long and has been relegated in the next season, in 2009. They had to wait until 2011 when led by Dariusz Luks the club was once again promoted to PlusLiga, playing there until this day.

In June 2014, an Italian expert Andrea Anastasi was officially presented as the club's new head coach. Anastasi was a head coach of the Polish national team in 2011–2013, and expressed a desire to work for the club from Gdańsk. Damian Schulz, Mateusz Mika and Wojciech Grzyb signed a contract with the club before the 2014–15 PlusLiga season. The team took 3rd place in the regular season of PlusLiga in which Anastasi's team won 19 and lost 7 matches. On 23 February 2015, Andrea Anastasi signed a new two–year contract, until 2017. Lotos Trefl advanced to the final of the 2014–15 PlusLiga season after winning in the semifinal against the Polish Champion PGE Skra Bełchatów in four matches (3–1). It was the first, historical promotion to the final of the Polish Championship. On 19 April 2015, the team competed in the final of the Polish Cup at Ergo Arena, and has sensationally beaten Asseco Resovia, winning the Cup for the first time in club's history. In the final of the 2014–15 PlusLiga season, Trefl Gdańsk lost to Asseco Resovia in three matches (0–3), and ended the season with silver medals.

On 28 October 2015, during the 2015 Polish SuperCup held at Arena Poznań in Poznań, Trefl defeated the Polish Champion Asseco Resovia in five sets (3–2), and won its first Polish SuperCup. During the 2015–16 PlusLiga season, the club also competed in the CEV Champions League. In the Playoff 12 stage Trefl lost to Russian club Zenit Kazan, the future competition champion (1–3, 0–3). In the domestic league, the club ended the season in 4th place.

The 2016–17 PlusLiga season did not end well for Trefl. The club did not manage to play in the PlusLiga playoffs, and lost in a match for seventh place to Cerrad Czarni Radom (3–2, 1–3).

During the 2017–18 PlusLiga season, the club won its 2nd Polish Cup, winning with PGE Skra Bełchatów in three sets (3–0). The club ended the season in 3rd place and gained the right to compete in the next CEV Champions League edition.

Anastasi remained as the club's head coach until 2019. During his last season as a head coach, the club competed in the 2018–19 CEV Champions League. The club not only won its group, losing only one time to PGE Skra Bełchatów but was also close to eliminate Zenit Kazan (the reigning European champion of that time) in the quarterfinal. Trefl lost its first match held at Ergo Arena, Gdańsk (2–3), but managed to win the second match held in Kazan (3–2). Eventually, the club lost in the golden set (12–15) and has been eliminated from the further competition. Andrea Anastasi was succeeded by the former Polish volleyball player – Michał Winiarski, as the head coach of Trefl on 6 June 2019.

== Team ==
As of 2026–27 season

No.	Name	Date of birth	Position
1	(Poland) Piotr Nowakowski	18 December 1987 (age 38)	middle blocker
4	(Poland) Przemysław Stępień	7 February 1994 (age 32)	setter
5	(Poland) Patryk Niemiec	18 February 1997 (age 29)	middle blocker
6	(Poland) Mariusz Schamlewski	16 January 1991 (age 35)	middle blocker
7	(Poland) Damian Schulz	26 February 1990 (age 36)	opposite
8	(Finland) Voitto Köykkä	9 July 1999 (age 27)	libero
9	(Poland) Aliaksei Nasevich	5 June 2003 (age 23)	opposite
10	(Poland) Damian Kogut	January 3, 1997 (age 29)	outside hitter
17	(Poland) Piotr Orczyk	19 March 1993 (age 33)	outside hitter
22	(Poland) Moustapha M'Baye	22 January 1992 (age 34)	middle blocker
26	(Poland) Maksymilian Durski	5 March 2007 (age 19)	outside hitter
27	(Poland) Michał Gierżot	4 October 2001 (age 25)	outside hitter
42	(Poland) Marcel Schadach	11 February 2008 (age 18)	libero
49	(United States) Joe Worsley	16 June 1997 (age 29)	setter
Head coach:		(Poland) Mariusz Sordyl	

== Season by season ==
Season	Tier	League	Pos.
2011–12	1	PlusLiga	9
2012–13	1	PlusLiga	8
2013–14	1	PlusLiga	10
2014–15	1	PlusLiga	2
2015–16	1	PlusLiga	4
2016–17	1	PlusLiga	8
2017–18	1	PlusLiga	3
2018–19	1	PlusLiga	9

Season	Tier	League	Pos.
2019–20	1	PlusLiga	5
2020–21	1	PlusLiga	6
2021–22	1	PlusLiga	7
2022–23	1	PlusLiga	6
2023–24	1	PlusLiga	6
2024–25	1	PlusLiga	11
2025–26	1	PlusLiga	9

== See also ==
- Trefl Gdańsk players
- Trefl Gdańsk coaches
