= 2013–14 PlusLiga =

- League: PlusLiga
- Sport: Volleyball
- Duration: 6 October 2013 – 27 April 2014
- Games: 174
- Teams: 12
- TV partner: Polsat Sport
- League champions: PGE Skra Bełchatów (8th title)

Seasons
- 2012–13 2014–15

The 2013–14 PlusLiga was the 78th season of the Polish Volleyball Championship, the 14th season as a professional league organized by the Professional Volleyball League SA (Polish: Profesjonalna Liga Piłki Siatkowej SA) under the supervision of the Polish Volleyball Federation (Polish: Polski Związek Piłki Siatkowej).

The number of teams competing in this season was increased from 10 to 12.

PGE Skra Bełchatów won their 8th title of the Polish Champions.

== Regular season ==
| Pos | Team | Pld | W | L | Pts | SW | SL | SR | SPW | SPL | SPR | Qualification |
|---|---|---|---|---|---|---|---|---|---|---|---|---|
| 1 | Asseco Resovia | 22 | 18 | 4 | 54 | 60 | 19 | 3.158 | 1892 | 1672 | 1.132 | Playoffs |
| 2 | PGE Skra Bełchatów | 22 | 17 | 5 | 52 | 57 | 22 | 2.591 | 1876 | 1616 | 1.161 | Playoffs |
| 3 | Jastrzębski Węgiel | 22 | 17 | 5 | 48 | 57 | 30 | 1.900 | 2026 | 1822 | 1.112 | Playoffs |
| 4 | ZAKSA Kędzierzyn-Koźle | 22 | 16 | 6 | 47 | 53 | 29 | 1.828 | 1881 | 1742 | 1.080 | Playoffs |
| 5 | Indykpol AZS Olsztyn | 22 | 11 | 11 | 35 | 42 | 39 | 1.077 | 1822 | 1831 | 0.995 | Playoffs |
| 6 | Cerrad Czarni Radom | 22 | 11 | 11 | 33 | 38 | 43 | 0.884 | 1810 | 1872 | 0.967 | Playoffs |
| 7 | AZS Politechnika Warszawska | 22 | 9 | 13 | 28 | 35 | 47 | 0.745 | 1832 | 1929 | 0.950 | Playoffs |
| 8 | Effector Kielce | 22 | 9 | 13 | 26 | 33 | 46 | 0.717 | 1769 | 1856 | 0.953 | Playoffs |
| 9 | Transfer Bydgoszcz | 22 | 8 | 14 | 25 | 35 | 49 | 0.714 | 1833 | 1908 | 0.961 | |
| 10 | Lotos Trefl Gdańsk | 22 | 7 | 15 | 22 | 31 | 48 | 0.646 | 1745 | 1826 | 0.956 | |
| 11 | AZS Częstochowa | 22 | 6 | 16 | 16 | 27 | 55 | 0.491 | 1777 | 1915 | 0.928 | |
| 12 | BBTS Bielsko-Biała | 22 | 3 | 19 | 10 | 19 | 60 | 0.317 | 1595 | 1869 | 0.853 | |

Source: PlusLiga

=== 1st round ===
| Date | Time | | Score | | Set 1 | Set 2 | Set 3 | Set 4 | Set 5 | Total | Report |
|---|---|---|---|---|---|---|---|---|---|---|---|
| 11 Oct | 16:00 | Asseco Resovia | 3–0 | BBTS Bielsko-Biała | 25–15 | 25–22 | 25–15 | | | 75–52 | |
| 12 Oct | 14:45 | ZAKSA Kędzierzyn-Koźle | 3–0 | Cerrad Czarni Radom | 25–22 | 25–16 | 25–17 | | | 75–55 | |
| 12 Oct | 18:00 | Jastrzębski Węgiel | 1–3 | Indykpol AZS Olsztyn | 22–25 | 25–20 | 21–25 | 21–25 | | 89–95 | |
| 12 Oct | 17:00 | Transfer Bydgoszcz | 1–3 | AZS Częstochowa | 13–25 | 19–25 | 26–24 | 20–25 | | 78–99 | |
| 12 Oct | 15:00 | PGE Skra Bełchatów | 3–1 | Lotos Trefl Gdańsk | 23–25 | 25–15 | 25–21 | 25–20 | | 98–81 | |
| 12 Oct | 17:00 | AZS Politechnika Warszawska | 3–0 | Effector Kielce | 25–22 | 27–25 | 25–23 | | | 77–70 | |

=== 2nd round ===
| Date | Time | | Score | | Set 1 | Set 2 | Set 3 | Set 4 | Set 5 | Total | Report |
|---|---|---|---|---|---|---|---|---|---|---|---|
| 19 Oct | 14:45 | BBTS Bielsko-Biała | 3–1 | AZS Politechnika Warszawska | 18–25 | 25–21 | 29–27 | 27–25 | | 99–98 | |
| 20 Oct | 17:00 | Effector Kielce | 1–3 | PGE Skra Bełchatów | 18–25 | 20–25 | 25–14 | 16–25 | | 79–89 | |
| 21 Oct | 19:30 | Lotos Trefl Gdańsk | 3–1 | Transfer Bydgoszcz | 25–22 | 25–18 | 16–25 | 25–22 | | 91–87 | |
| 18 Oct | 18:00 | AZS Częstochowa | 0–3 | Jastrzębski Węgiel | 20–25 | 20–25 | 20–25 | | | 60–75 | |
| 19 Oct | 17:00 | Indykpol AZS Olsztyn | 3–1 | ZAKSA Kędzierzyn-Koźle | 25–20 | 26–24 | 17–25 | 34–32 | | 102–101 | |
| 19 Oct | 17:00 | Cerrad Czarni Radom | 0–3 | Asseco Resovia | 22–25 | 22–25 | 21–25 | | | 65–75 | |

=== 3rd round ===
| Date | Time | | Score | | Set 1 | Set 2 | Set 3 | Set 4 | Set 5 | Total | Report |
|---|---|---|---|---|---|---|---|---|---|---|---|
| 26 Oct | 17:00 | ZAKSA Kędzierzyn-Koźle | 3–0 | BBTS Bielsko-Biała | 25–22 | 25–17 | 25–15 | | | 75–54 | |
| 26 Oct | 14:45 | Jastrzębski Węgiel | 3–1 | Asseco Resovia | 30–28 | 25–19 | 23–25 | 25–22 | | 103–94 | |
| 26 Oct | 17:00 | Transfer Bydgoszcz | 1–3 | Cerrad Czarni Radom | 25–18 | 21–25 | 26–28 | 26–28 | | 98–99 | |
| 27 Oct | 14:45 | PGE Skra Bełchatów | 3–1 | Indykpol AZS Olsztyn | 25–22 | 26–24 | 21–25 | 25–20 | | 97–91 | |
| 25 Oct | 19:00 | AZS Politechnika Warszawska | 3–0 | AZS Częstochowa | 25–19 | 25–20 | 29–27 | | | 79–66 | |
| 26 Oct | 17:00 | Effector Kielce | 3–0 | Lotos Trefl Gdańsk | 25–22 | 25–21 | 25–22 | | | 75–65 | |

=== 4th round ===
| Date | Time | | Score | | Set 1 | Set 2 | Set 3 | Set 4 | Set 5 | Total | Report |
|---|---|---|---|---|---|---|---|---|---|---|---|
| 2 Nov | 17:00 | BBTS Bielsko-Biała | 0–3 | Lotos Trefl Gdańsk | 22–25 | 15–25 | 21–25 | | | 58–75 | |
| 1 Nov | 18:00 | AZS Częstochowa | 1–3 | Effector Kielce | 24–26 | 25–18 | 20–25 | | | 69–69 | |
| 2 Nov | 17:00 | Indykpol AZS Olsztyn | 3–0 | AZS Politechnika Warszawska | 25–21 | 25–12 | 25–18 | | | 75–51 | |
| 2 Nov | 17:00 | Cerrad Czarni Radom | 3–1 | PGE Skra Bełchatów | 29–27 | 21–25 | 25–22 | 25–22 | | 100–96 | |
| 2 Nov | 17:00 | Asseco Resovia | 3–1 | Transfer Bydgoszcz | 25–18 | 25–13 | 21–25 | 25–21 | | 96–77 | |
| 2 Nov | 14:45 | ZAKSA Kędzierzyn-Koźle | 2–3 | Jastrzębski Węgiel | 18–25 | 18–25 | 25–17 | 25–20 | 9–15 | 95–102 | |

=== 5th round ===
| Date | Time | | Score | | Set 1 | Set 2 | Set 3 | Set 4 | Set 5 | Total | Report |
|---|---|---|---|---|---|---|---|---|---|---|---|
| 10 Nov | 18:00 | Jastrzębski Węgiel | 3–1 | BBTS Bielsko-Biała | 25–21 | 25–21 | 22–25 | 25–14 | | 97–81 | |
| 8 Nov | 18:00 | Transfer Bydgoszcz | 2–3 | ZAKSA Kędzierzyn-Koźle | 23–25 | 25–20 | 25–19 | 20–25 | 10–15 | 103–104 | |
| 9 Nov | 14:45 | PGE Skra Bełchatów | 3–2 | Asseco Resovia | 21–25 | 25–22 | 25–18 | 21–25 | 15–12 | 107–102 | |
| 9 Nov | 17:00 | Cerrad Czarni Radom | 3–0 | AZS Politechnika Warszawska | 25–19 | 25–17 | 25–17 | | | 75–53 | |
| 10 Nov | 17:00 | Effector Kielce | 1–3 | Indykpol AZS Olsztyn | 16–25 | 25–21 | 21–25 | 23–25 | | 85–96 | |
| 8 Nov | 19:30 | Lotos Trefl Gdańsk | 0–3 | AZS Częstochowa | 21–25 | 13–25 | 23–25 | | | 57–75 | |

=== 6th round ===
| Date | Time | | Score | | Set 1 | Set 2 | Set 3 | Set 4 | Set 5 | Total | Report |
|---|---|---|---|---|---|---|---|---|---|---|---|
| 17 Nov | 17:00 | BBTS Bielsko-Biała | 3–0 | AZS Częstochowa | 25–21 | 25–19 | 25–22 | | | 75–62 | |
| 15 Nov | 17:30 | Indykpol AZS Olsztyn | 0–3 | Lotos Trefl Gdańsk | 22–25 | 18–24 | 20–25 | | | 60–74 | |
| 17 Nov | 17:00 | Cerrad Czarni Radom | 0–3 | Effector Kielce | 18–25 | 23–25 | 20–25 | | | 61–75 | |
| 16 Nov | 17:00 | Asseco Resovia | 3–1 | AZS Politechnika Warszawska | 23–25 | 25–14 | 25–19 | 25–20 | | 98–78 | |
| 16 Nov | 14:45 | ZAKSA Kędzierzyn-Koźle | 3–1 | PGE Skra Bełchatów | 22–25 | 25–20 | 25–19 | 25–21 | | 97–85 | |
| 16 Nov | 18:00 | Jastrzębski Węgiel | 3–0 | Transfer Bydgoszcz | 25–14 | 25–20 | 25–22 | | | 75–56 | |

=== 7th round ===
| Date | Time | | Score | | Set 1 | Set 2 | Set 3 | Set 4 | Set 5 | Total | Report |
|---|---|---|---|---|---|---|---|---|---|---|---|
| 23 Nov | 17:00 | Transfer Bydgoszcz | 3–1 | BBTS Bielsko-Biała | 25–21 | 27–25 | 23–25 | 25–23 | | 100–94 | |
| 23 Nov | 14:45 | PGE Skra Bełchatów | 3–1 | Jastrzębski Węgiel | 18–25 | 27–25 | 25–23 | 25–21 | | 95–94 | |
| 21 Nov | 20:00 | AZS Politechnika Warszawska | 0–3 | ZAKSA Kędzierzyn-Koźle | 15–25 | 20–25 | 21–25 | | | 56–75 | |
| 23 Nov | 18:00 | Effector Kielce | 0–3 | Asseco Resovia | 23–25 | 25–27 | 17–25 | | | 65–77 | |
| 22 Nov | 18:00 | Lotos Trefl Gdańsk | 2–3 | Cerrad Czarni Radom | 23–25 | 26–24 | 23–25 | 25–23 | 10–15 | 107–112 | |
| 23 Nov | 17:00 | AZS Częstochowa | 3–2 | Indykpol AZS Olsztyn | 25–18 | 25–23 | 15–25 | 20–25 | 15–12 | 100–103 | |

=== 8th round ===
| Date | Time | | Score | | Set 1 | Set 2 | Set 3 | Set 4 | Set 5 | Total | Report |
|---|---|---|---|---|---|---|---|---|---|---|---|
| 29 Nov | 18:00 | BBTS Bielsko-Biała | 0–3 | Indykpol AZS Olsztyn | 18–25 | 23–25 | 17–25 | | | 58–75 | |
| 2 Dec | 18:00 | Cerrad Czarni Radom | 3–1 | AZS Częstochowa | 25–18 | 25–23 | 23–25 | 25–19 | | 98–85 | |
| 30 Nov | 17:00 | Asseco Resovia | 3–0 | Lotos Trefl Gdańsk | 25–21 | 25–22 | 25–19 | | | 75–62 | |
| 30 Nov | 17:00 | ZAKSA Kędzierzyn-Koźle | 3–1 | Effector Kielce | 25–22 | 25–21 | 20–25 | 25–22 | | 95–90 | |
| 30 Nov | 18:00 | Jastrzębski Węgiel | 3–2 | AZS Politechnika Warszawska | 23–25 | 23–25 | 25–17 | 29–27 | 18–16 | 118–110 | |
| 30 Nov | 14:45 | Transfer Bydgoszcz | 0–3 | PGE Skra Bełchatów | 17–25 | 15–25 | 20–25 | | | 52–75 | |

=== 9th round ===
| Date | Time | | Score | | Set 1 | Set 2 | Set 3 | Set 4 | Set 5 | Total | Report |
|---|---|---|---|---|---|---|---|---|---|---|---|
| 7 Dec | 15:00 | PGE Skra Bełchatów | 3–0 | BBTS Bielsko-Biała | 25–14 | 25–17 | 25–11 | | | 75–42 | |
| 6 Dec | 19:00 | AZS Politechnika Warszawska | 3–1 | Transfer Bydgoszcz | 21–25 | 25–23 | 27–25 | 25–17 | | 98–90 | |
| 6 Dec | 18:00 | Effector Kielce | 1–3 | Jastrzębski Węgiel | 19–25 | 28–26 | 19–25 | 21–25 | | 87–101 | |
| 7 Dec | 14:45 | Lotos Trefl Gdańsk | 1–3 | ZAKSA Kędzierzyn-Koźle | 25–17 | 23–25 | 14–25 | 20–25 | | 82–92 | |
| 7 Dec | 17:00 | AZS Częstochowa | 0–3 | Asseco Resovia | 35–37 | 19–25 | 17–25 | | | 71–87 | |
| 7 Dec | 17:00 | Indykpol AZS Olsztyn | 1–3 | Cerrad Czarni Radom | 23–25 | 17–25 | 32–30 | 17–25 | | 89–105 | |

=== 10th round ===
| Date | Time | | Score | | Set 1 | Set 2 | Set 3 | Set 4 | Set 5 | Total | Report |
|---|---|---|---|---|---|---|---|---|---|---|---|
| 14 Dec | 17:00 | BBTS Bielsko-Biała | 3–2 | Cerrad Czarni Radom | 25–16 | 25–20 | 15–25 | 20–25 | 15–13 | 100–99 | |
| 15 Dec | 14:45 | Asseco Resovia | 3–1 | Indykpol AZS Olsztyn | 25–16 | 16–25 | 25–20 | 28–26 | | 94–87 | |
| 14 Dec | 17:00 | ZAKSA Kędzierzyn-Koźle | 3–1 | AZS Częstochowa | 21–25 | 25–23 | 25–23 | 25–21 | | 96–92 | |
| 13 Dec | 18:00 | Jastrzębski Węgiel | 3–1 | Lotos Trefl Gdańsk | 23–25 | 25–13 | 25–20 | 25–20 | | 98–78 | |
| 14 Dec | 17:00 | Transfer Bydgoszcz | 3–0 | Effector Kielce | 25–21 | 25–18 | 25–19 | | | 75–58 | |
| 14 Dec | 15:00 | PGE Skra Bełchatów | 3–0 | AZS Politechnika Warszawska | 25–15 | 30–28 | 25–21 | | | 80–64 | |

=== 11th round ===
| Date | Time | | Score | | Set 1 | Set 2 | Set 3 | Set 4 | Set 5 | Total | Report |
|---|---|---|---|---|---|---|---|---|---|---|---|
| 23 Dec | 18:00 | Effector Kielce | 3–1 | BBTS Bielsko-Biała | 22–25 | 25–17 | 26–24 | 25–15 | | 98–81 | |
| 21 Dec | 14:45 | Lotos Trefl Gdańsk | 1–3 | AZS Politechnika Warszawska | 15–25 | 24–26 | 26–24 | 22–25 | | 87–100 | |
| 19 Dec | 18:00 | AZS Częstochowa | 0–3 | PGE Skra Bełchatów | 19–25 | 21–25 | 18–25 | | | 58–75 | |
| 22 Dec | 14:45 | Indykpol AZS Olsztyn | 3–0 | Transfer Bydgoszcz | 25–23 | 25–22 | 25–22 | | | 75–67 | |
| 26 Nov | 18:00 | Cerrad Czarni Radom | 3–0 | Jastrzębski Węgiel | 25–21 | 26–24 | 25–22 | | | 76–67 | |
| 27 Nov | 20:00 | Asseco Resovia | 3–0 | ZAKSA Kędzierzyn-Koźle | 25–23 | 25–23 | 25–19 | | | 75–65 | |

=== 12th round ===
| Date | Time | | Score | | Set 1 | Set 2 | Set 3 | Set 4 | Set 5 | Total | Report |
|---|---|---|---|---|---|---|---|---|---|---|---|
| 22 Feb | 17:00 | BBTS Bielsko-Biała | 0–3 | Asseco Resovia | 22–25 | 18–25 | 21–25 | | | 61–75 | |
| 23 Feb | 14:45 | Cerrad Czarni Radom | 0–3 | ZAKSA Kędzierzyn-Koźle | 25–27 | 19–25 | 17–25 | | | 61–77 | |
| 22 Feb | 14:45 | Indykpol AZS Olsztyn | 0–3 | Jastrzębski Węgiel | 14–25 | 13–25 | 17–25 | | | 44–75 | |
| 21 Feb | 18:00 | AZS Częstochowa | 3–2 | Transfer Bydgoszcz | 18–25 | 26–24 | 21–25 | 29–27 | 15–10 | 109–111 | |
| 27 Nov | 19:00 | Lotos Trefl Gdańsk | 0–3 | PGE Skra Bełchatów | 21–25 | 8–25 | 16–25 | | | 45–75 | |
| 24 Feb | 18:00 | Effector Kielce | 3–1 | AZS Politechnika Warszawska | 24–26 | 25–18 | 25–22 | 25–23 | | 99–89 | |

=== 13th round ===
| Date | Time | | Score | | Set 1 | Set 2 | Set 3 | Set 4 | Set 5 | Total | Report |
|---|---|---|---|---|---|---|---|---|---|---|---|
| 3 Mar | 18:00 | AZS Politechnika Warszawska | 3–1 | BBTS Bielsko-Biała | 16–25 | 25–21 | 25–20 | 25–20 | | 91–86 | |
| 5 Mar | 18:00 | PGE Skra Bełchatów | 2–3 | Effector Kielce | 25–23 | 22–25 | 32–30 | 22–25 | 14–16 | 115–119 | |
| 5 Mar | 18:00 | Transfer Bydgoszcz | 3–2 | Lotos Trefl Gdańsk | 17–25 | 18–25 | 28–26 | 27–25 | 17–15 | 107–116 | |
| 28 Feb | 18:00 | Jastrzębski Węgiel | 3–1 | AZS Częstochowa | 25–27 | 25–20 | 25–19 | 25–20 | | 100–86 | |
| 2 Mar | 14:45 | ZAKSA Kędzierzyn-Koźle | 3–0 | Indykpol AZS Olsztyn | 25–18 | 25–15 | 25–21 | | | 75–54 | |
| 1 Mar | 14:45 | Asseco Resovia | 3–0 | Cerrad Czarni Radom | 25–12 | 25–13 | 25–13 | | | 75–38 | |

=== 14th round ===
| Date | Time | | Score | | Set 1 | Set 2 | Set 3 | Set 4 | Set 5 | Total | Report |
|---|---|---|---|---|---|---|---|---|---|---|---|
| 7 Jan | 19:00 | BBTS Bielsko-Biała | 0–3 | ZAKSA Kędzierzyn-Koźle | 19–25 | 19–25 | 11–25 | | | 49–75 | |
| 8 Jan | 17:30 | Asseco Resovia | 3–2 | Jastrzębski Węgiel | 25–22 | 22–25 | 25–20 | 24–26 | 15–12 | 111–105 | |
| 8 Jan | 18:00 | Cerrad Czarni Radom | 0–3 | Transfer Bydgoszcz | 21–25 | 26–28 | 20–25 | | | 67–78 | |
| 8 Jan | 20:30 | Indykpol AZS Olsztyn | 0–3 | PGE Skra Bełchatów | 21–25 | 18–25 | 22–25 | | | 61–75 | |
| 8 Jan | 18:30 | AZS Częstochowa | 1–3 | AZS Politechnika Warszawska | 25–15 | 29–31 | 20–25 | 18–25 | | 92–96 | |
| 8 Jan | 19:00 | Lotos Trefl Gdańsk | 3–0 | Effector Kielce | 29–27 | 25–18 | 26–24 | | | 80–69 | |

=== 15th round ===
| Date | Time | | Score | | Set 1 | Set 2 | Set 3 | Set 4 | Set 5 | Total | Report |
|---|---|---|---|---|---|---|---|---|---|---|---|
| 11 Jan | 17:00 | Lotos Trefl Gdańsk | 3–0 | BBTS Bielsko-Biała | 25–17 | 25–15 | 25–20 | | | 75–52 | |
| 11 Jan | 17:00 | Effector Kielce | 0–3 | AZS Częstochowa | 21–25 | 18–25 | 16–25 | | | 55–75 | |
| 12 Jan | 15:00 | AZS Politechnika Warszawska | 3–1 | Indykpol AZS Olsztyn | 25–18 | 25–20 | 22–25 | 25–18 | | 97–81 | |
| 11 Jan | 14:45 | PGE Skra Bełchatów | 3–0 | Cerrad Czarni Radom | 25–23 | 25–17 | 25–21 | | | 75–61 | |
| 11 Jan | 14:45 | Transfer Bydgoszcz | 0–3 | Asseco Resovia | 23–25 | 19–25 | 20–25 | | | 62–75 | |
| 11 Jan | 18:00 | Jastrzębski Węgiel | 2–3 | ZAKSA Kędzierzyn-Koźle | 23–25 | 12–25 | 25–21 | 25–22 | 15–17 | 100–110 | |

=== 16th round ===
| Date | Time | | Score | | Set 1 | Set 2 | Set 3 | Set 4 | Set 5 | Total | Report |
|---|---|---|---|---|---|---|---|---|---|---|---|
| 18 Jan | 17:00 | BBTS Bielsko-Biała | 2–3 | Jastrzębski Węgiel | 25–22 | 22–25 | 20–25 | 25–20 | 12–15 | 104–107 | |
| 17 Jan | 18:00 | ZAKSA Kędzierzyn-Koźle | 2–3 | Transfer Bydgoszcz | 25–21 | 17–25 | 25–16 | 22–25 | 7–15 | 96–102 | |
| 18 Jan | 14:45 | Asseco Resovia | 3–0 | PGE Skra Bełchatów | 25–20 | 25–15 | 25–23 | | | 75–58 | |
| 17 Jan | 18:00 | AZS Politechnika Warszawska | 1–3 | Cerrad Czarni Radom | 25–21 | 18–25 | 24–26 | 22–25 | | 89–97 | |
| 18 Jan | 17:00 | Indykpol AZS Olsztyn | 3–1 | Effector Kielce | 25–23 | 25–17 | 23–25 | 25–16 | | 98–81 | |
| 18 Jan | 17:00 | AZS Częstochowa | 0–3 | Lotos Trefl Gdańsk | 17–25 | 17–25 | 18–25 | | | 52–75 | |

=== 17th round ===
| Date | Time | | Score | | Set 1 | Set 2 | Set 3 | Set 4 | Set 5 | Total | Report |
|---|---|---|---|---|---|---|---|---|---|---|---|
| 25 Jan | 17:00 | AZS Częstochowa | 3–2 | BBTS Bielsko-Biała | 18–25 | 25–20 | 25–23 | 21–25 | 15–13 | 104–106 | |
| 25 Jan | 20:00 | Lotos Trefl Gdańsk | 1–3 | Indykpol AZS Olsztyn | 21–25 | 26–24 | 23–25 | 23–25 | | 93–99 | |
| 25 Jan | 14:45 | Effector Kielce | 3–1 | Cerrad Czarni Radom | 23–25 | 31–29 | 25–22 | 25–23 | | 104–99 | |
| 26 Jan | 20:00 | AZS Politechnika Warszawska | 3–1 | Asseco Resovia | 27–25 | 23–25 | 25–21 | 27–25 | | 102–96 | |
| 26 Jan | 14:45 | PGE Skra Bełchatów | 3–0 | ZAKSA Kędzierzyn-Koźle | 25–22 | 25–14 | 25–11 | | | 75–47 | |
| 25 Jan | 17:00 | Transfer Bydgoszcz | 0–3 | Jastrzębski Węgiel | 19–25 | 12–25 | 22–25 | | | 53–75 | |

=== 18th round ===
| Date | Time | | Score | | Set 1 | Set 2 | Set 3 | Set 4 | Set 5 | Total | Report |
|---|---|---|---|---|---|---|---|---|---|---|---|
| 29 Jan | 19:00 | BBTS Bielsko-Biała | 0–3 | Transfer Bydgoszcz | 19–25 | 18–25 | 17–25 | | | 54–75 | |
| 29 Jan | 17:30 | Jastrzębski Węgiel | 3–2 | PGE Skra Bełchatów | 25–21 | 25–22 | 19–25 | 20–25 | 15–13 | 104–106 | |
| 29 Jan | 18:00 | ZAKSA Kędzierzyn-Koźle | 3–0 | AZS Politechnika Warszawska | 25–23 | 25–17 | 28–26 | | | 78–66 | |
| 29 Jan | 18:00 | Asseco Resovia | 3–0 | Effector Kielce | 25–17 | 25–23 | 25–22 | | | 75–62 | |
| 29 Jan | 18:00 | Cerrad Czarni Radom | 3–1 | Lotos Trefl Gdańsk | 35–33 | 25–18 | 22–25 | 25–22 | | 107–98 | |
| 29 Jan | 20:30 | Indykpol AZS Olsztyn | 3–0 | AZS Częstochowa | 25–19 | 25–14 | 25–19 | | | 75–52 | |

=== 19th round ===
| Date | Time | | Score | | Set 1 | Set 2 | Set 3 | Set 4 | Set 5 | Total | Report |
|---|---|---|---|---|---|---|---|---|---|---|---|
| 2 Feb | 17:00 | Indykpol AZS Olsztyn | 3–1 | BBTS Bielsko-Biała | 25–15 | 25–22 | 18–25 | 25–21 | | 93–83 | |
| 1 Feb | 17:00 | AZS Częstochowa | 2–3 | Cerrad Czarni Radom | 25–19 | 25–19 | 26–28 | 22–25 | 13–15 | 111–106 | |
| 1 Feb | 14:45 | Lotos Trefl Gdańsk | 0–3 | Asseco Resovia | 22–25 | 19–25 | 26–28 | | | 67–78 | |
| 1 Feb | 17:00 | Effector Kielce | 3–0 | ZAKSA Kędzierzyn-Koźle | 25–23 | 25–23 | 27–25 | | | 77–71 | |
| 1 Feb | 17:00 | AZS Politechnika Warszawska | 0–3 | Jastrzębski Węgiel | 28–30 | 22–25 | 19–25 | | | 69–80 | |
| 1 Feb | 15:00 | PGE Skra Bełchatów | 3–0 | Transfer Bydgoszcz | 25–23 | 25–19 | 25–18 | | | 75–60 | |

=== 20th round ===
| Date | Time | | Score | | Set 1 | Set 2 | Set 3 | Set 4 | Set 5 | Total | Report |
|---|---|---|---|---|---|---|---|---|---|---|---|
| 8 Feb | 17:00 | BBTS Bielsko-Biała | 0–3 | PGE Skra Bełchatów | 16–25 | 18–25 | 21–25 | | | 55–75 | |
| 7 Feb | 18:00 | Transfer Bydgoszcz | 2–3 | AZS Politechnika Warszawska | 25–22 | 22–25 | 25–22 | 19–25 | 14–16 | 105–110 | |
| 8 Feb | 18:00 | Jastrzębski Węgiel | 3–0 | Effector Kielce | 25–21 | 25–18 | 25–16 | | | 75–55 | |
| 8 Feb | 17:00 | ZAKSA Kędzierzyn-Koźle | 3–0 | Lotos Trefl Gdańsk | 30–28 | 25–20 | 25–23 | | | 80–71 | |
| 8 Feb | 18:00 | Asseco Resovia | 3–0 | AZS Częstochowa | 27–25 | 25–16 | 25–23 | | | 77–64 | |
| 8 Feb | 14:45 | Cerrad Czarni Radom | 0–3 | Indykpol AZS Olsztyn | 19–25 | 23–25 | 23–25 | | | 65–75 | |

=== 21st round ===
| Date | Time | | Score | | Set 1 | Set 2 | Set 3 | Set 4 | Set 5 | Total | Report |
|---|---|---|---|---|---|---|---|---|---|---|---|
| 14 Feb | 18:00 | Cerrad Czarni Radom | 3–0 | BBTS Bielsko-Biała | 25–21 | 25–19 | 25–23 | | | 75–63 | |
| 15 Feb | 14:45 | Indykpol AZS Olsztyn | 2–3 | Asseco Resovia | 25–21 | 24–26 | 25–22 | 20–25 | 8–15 | 102–109 | |
| 15 Feb | 17:00 | AZS Częstochowa | 1–3 | ZAKSA Kędzierzyn-Koźle | 22–25 | 27–29 | 25–19 | 22–25 | | 96–98 | |
| 15 Feb | 18:30 | Lotos Trefl Gdańsk | 0–3 | Jastrzębski Węgiel | 27–29 | 15–25 | 17–25 | | | 59–79 | |
| 14 Feb | 18:00 | Effector Kielce | 1–3 | Transfer Bydgoszcz | 15–25 | 25–18 | 15–25 | 23–25 | | 78–93 | |
| 16 Feb | 14:45 | AZS Politechnika Warszawska | 0–3 | PGE Skra Bełchatów | 18–25 | 17–25 | 16–25 | | | 51–75 | |

=== 22nd round ===
| Date | Time | | Score | | Set 1 | Set 2 | Set 3 | Set 4 | Set 5 | Total | Report |
|---|---|---|---|---|---|---|---|---|---|---|---|
| 19 Feb | 19:00 | BBTS Bielsko-Biała | 1–3 | Effector Kielce | 18–25 | 17–25 | 25–19 | 18–25 | | 78–94 | |
| 19 Feb | 19:00 | AZS Politechnika Warszawska | 2–3 | Lotos Trefl Gdańsk | 25–23 | 25–19 | 23–25 | 22–25 | 13–15 | 108–107 | |
| 19 Feb | 18:00 | PGE Skra Bełchatów | 3–1 | AZS Częstochowa | 25–15 | 25–20 | 24–26 | 25–17 | | 99–78 | |
| 19 Feb | 18:00 | Transfer Bydgoszcz | 3–1 | Indykpol AZS Olsztyn | 28–26 | 25–15 | 26–28 | 25–23 | | 104–92 | |
| 19 Feb | 18:00 | Jastrzębski Węgiel | 3–2 | Cerrad Czarni Radom | 25–22 | 22–25 | 25–16 | 20–25 | 15–11 | 107–99 | |
| 19 Feb | 20:30 | ZAKSA Kędzierzyn-Koźle | 3–2 | Asseco Resovia | 18–25 | 25–21 | 25–13 | 21–25 | 15–13 | 104–97 | |

== Playoffs ==
Quarterfinals
1 | Asseco Resovia | 3
8 | Effector Kielce | 0
5 | Indykpol AZS Olsztyn | 0
4 | ZAKSA Kędzierzyn-Koźle | 3
3 | Jastrzębski Węgiel | 3
6 | Cerrad Czarni Radom | 0
7 | AZS Politechnika Warszawska | 0
2 | PGE Skra Bełchatów | 3

Semifinals
1 | Asseco Resovia | 3
4 | ZAKSA Kędzierzyn-Koźle | 2
3 | Jastrzębski Węgiel | 0
2 | PGE Skra Bełchatów | 3

Finals
1 | Asseco Resovia | 0
2 | PGE Skra Bełchatów | 3

=== 1st round ===
==== Quarterfinals ====
- (to 3 victories)

| Date | Time | | Score | | Set 1 | Set 2 | Set 3 | Set 4 | Set 5 | Total | Report |
|---|---|---|---|---|---|---|---|---|---|---|---|
| 8 Mar | 18:00 | Asseco Resovia | 3–0 | Effector Kielce | 25–15 | 25–22 | 25–15 | | | 75–52 | |
| 9 Mar | 14:45 | Asseco Resovia | 3–0 | Effector Kielce | 25–18 | 25–18 | 25–18 | | | 75–54 | |
| 23 Mar | 18:00 | Effector Kielce | 0–3 | Asseco Resovia | 15–25 | 18–25 | 18–25 | | | 51–75 | |

| Date | Time | | Score | | Set 1 | Set 2 | Set 3 | Set 4 | Set 5 | Total | Report |
|---|---|---|---|---|---|---|---|---|---|---|---|
| 8 Mar | 15:00 | PGE Skra Bełchatów | 3–1 | AZS Politechnika Warszawska | 25–17 | 20–25 | 25–20 | 25–20 | | 95–82 | |
| 9 Mar | 15:00 | PGE Skra Bełchatów | 3–0 | AZS Politechnika Warszawska | 26–24 | 25–16 | 25–15 | | | 76–55 | |
| 24 Mar | 19:00 | AZS Politechnika Warszawska | 1–3 | PGE Skra Bełchatów | 23–25 | 19–25 | 25–21 | 21–25 | | 88–96 | |

| Date | Time | | Score | | Set 1 | Set 2 | Set 3 | Set 4 | Set 5 | Total | Report |
|---|---|---|---|---|---|---|---|---|---|---|---|
| 6 Mar | 18:00 | Jastrzębski Węgiel | 3–0 | Cerrad Czarni Radom | 25–15 | 25–19 | 25–22 | | | 75–56 | |
| 7 Mar | 18:00 | Jastrzębski Węgiel | 3–0 | Cerrad Czarni Radom | 28–26 | 25–18 | 25–18 | | | 78–62 | |
| 28 Mar | 18:00 | Cerrad Czarni Radom | 0–3 | Jastrzębski Węgiel | 16–25 | 18–25 | 19–25 | | | 53–75 | |

| Date | Time | | Score | | Set 1 | Set 2 | Set 3 | Set 4 | Set 5 | Total | Report |
|---|---|---|---|---|---|---|---|---|---|---|---|
| 7 Mar | 18:00 | ZAKSA Kędzierzyn-Koźle | 3–0 | Indykpol AZS Olsztyn | 25–19 | 25–23 | 25–19 | | | 75–61 | |
| 8 Mar | 18:00 | ZAKSA Kędzierzyn-Koźle | 3–0 | Indykpol AZS Olsztyn | 25–20 | 25–21 | 25–19 | | | 75–60 | |
| 23 Mar | 17:00 | Indykpol AZS Olsztyn | 2–3 | ZAKSA Kędzierzyn-Koźle | 15–25 | 25–20 | 25–23 | 19–25 | 7–15 | 91–108 | |

=== 2nd round ===
==== Semifinals ====
- (to 3 victories)

| Date | Time | | Score | | Set 1 | Set 2 | Set 3 | Set 4 | Set 5 | Total | Report |
|---|---|---|---|---|---|---|---|---|---|---|---|
| 4 Apr | 20:00 | Asseco Resovia | 2–3 | ZAKSA Kędzierzyn-Koźle | 25–20 | 22–25 | 25–17 | 19–25 | 13–15 | 104–102 | |
| 5 Apr | 20:00 | Asseco Resovia | 2–3 | ZAKSA Kędzierzyn-Koźle | 18–25 | 25–18 | 20–25 | 25–23 | 11–15 | 99–106 | |
| 11 Apr | 18:00 | ZAKSA Kędzierzyn-Koźle | 2–3 | Asseco Resovia | 25–16 | 27–25 | 23–25 | 22–25 | 10–15 | 107–106 | |
| 12 Apr | 14:45 | ZAKSA Kędzierzyn-Koźle | 1–3 | Asseco Resovia | 18–25 | 25–22 | 21–25 | 21–25 | | 85–97 | |
| 17 Apr | 20:30 | Asseco Resovia | 3–1 | ZAKSA Kędzierzyn-Koźle | 25–19 | 17–25 | 25–22 | 25–21 | | 92–87 | |

| Date | Time | | Score | | Set 1 | Set 2 | Set 3 | Set 4 | Set 5 | Total | Report |
|---|---|---|---|---|---|---|---|---|---|---|---|
| 6 Apr | 13:30 | PGE Skra Bełchatów | 3–2 | Jastrzębski Węgiel | 25–23 | 17–25 | 23–25 | 25–17 | 15–11 | 105–101 | |
| 7 Apr | 18:00 | PGE Skra Bełchatów | 3–0 | Jastrzębski Węgiel | 25–23 | 25–20 | 25–15 | | | 75–58 | |
| 13 Apr | 14:45 | Jastrzębski Węgiel | 0–3 | PGE Skra Bełchatów | 23–25 | 18–25 | 17–25 | | | 58–75 | |

==== 5th–8th places ====
- (to 2 victories)

| Date | Time | | Score | | Set 1 | Set 2 | Set 3 | Set 4 | Set 5 | Total | Report |
|---|---|---|---|---|---|---|---|---|---|---|---|
| 5 Apr | 17:00 | Effector Kielce | 0–3 | Indykpol AZS Olsztyn | 23–25 | 22–25 | 26–28 | | | 71–78 | |
| 12 Apr | 17:00 | Indykpol AZS Olsztyn | 3–2 | Effector Kielce | 25–20 | 25–21 | 20–25 | 21–25 | 15–11 | 106–102 | |

| Date | Time | | Score | | Set 1 | Set 2 | Set 3 | Set 4 | Set 5 | Total | Report |
|---|---|---|---|---|---|---|---|---|---|---|---|
| 6 Apr | 15:00 | AZS Politechnika Warszawska | 3–0 | Cerrad Czarni Radom | 27–25 | 25–19 | 25–21 | | | 77–65 | |
| 12 Apr | 17:00 | Cerrad Czarni Radom | 2–3 | AZS Politechnika Warszawska | 25–17 | 20–25 | 25–20 | 23–25 | 14–16 | 107–103 | |

=== 3rd round ===
==== 11th place ====
- (to 2 victories)

| Date | Time | | Score | | Set 1 | Set 2 | Set 3 | Set 4 | Set 5 | Total | Report |
|---|---|---|---|---|---|---|---|---|---|---|---|
| 22 Mar | 17:00 | BBTS Bielsko-Biała | 1–3 | Lotos Trefl Gdańsk | 25–20 | 18–25 | 24–26 | 20–25 | | 87–96 | |
| 5 Apr | 11:00 | Lotos Trefl Gdańsk | 3–0 | BBTS Bielsko-Biała | 25–11 | 25–17 | 25–15 | | | 75–43 | |

==== 9th place ====
- (to 2 victories)

| Date | Time | | Score | | Set 1 | Set 2 | Set 3 | Set 4 | Set 5 | Total | Report |
|---|---|---|---|---|---|---|---|---|---|---|---|
| 20 Mar | 18:30 | AZS Częstochowa | 1–3 | Transfer Bydgoszcz | 25–13 | 21–25 | 18–25 | 23–25 | | 87–88 | |
| 28 Mar | 18:00 | Transfer Bydgoszcz | 3–1 | AZS Częstochowa | 25–12 | 25–22 | 23–25 | 25–13 | | 98–72 | |

==== 7th place ====
- (to 2 victories)

| Date | Time | | Score | | Set 1 | Set 2 | Set 3 | Set 4 | Set 5 | Total | Report |
|---|---|---|---|---|---|---|---|---|---|---|---|
| 17 Apr | 18:00 | Effector Kielce | 1–3 | Cerrad Czarni Radom | 26–28 | 25–20 | 23–25 | 18–25 | | 92–98 | |
| 25 Apr | 18:00 | Cerrad Czarni Radom | 3–2 | Effector Kielce | 24–26 | 25–22 | 18–25 | 25–22 | 15–13 | 107–108 | |

==== 5th place ====
- (to 3 victories)

| Date | Time | | Score | | Set 1 | Set 2 | Set 3 | Set 4 | Set 5 | Total | Report |
|---|---|---|---|---|---|---|---|---|---|---|---|
| 18 Apr | 18:00 | Indykpol AZS Olsztyn | 3–2 | AZS Politechnika Warszawska | 25–21 | 25–19 | 21–25 | 24–26 | 15–9 | 110–100 | |
| 19 Apr | 18:00 | Indykpol AZS Olsztyn | 2–3 | AZS Politechnika Warszawska | 25–18 | 19–25 | 25–20 | 17–25 | 5–15 | 91–103 | |
| 26 Apr | 18:00 | AZS Politechnika Warszawska | 3–2 | Indykpol AZS Olsztyn | 23–25 | 22–25 | 25–22 | 25–19 | 15–11 | 110–102 | |
| 27 Apr | 18:00 | AZS Politechnika Warszawska | 1–3 | Indykpol AZS Olsztyn | 21–25 | 25–20 | 23–25 | 18–25 | | 87–95 | |
| 30 Apr | 18:00 | Indykpol AZS Olsztyn | 3–2 | AZS Politechnika Warszawska | 18–25 | 25–19 | 25–18 | 20–25 | 18–16 | 106–103 | |

==== 3rd place ====
- (to 3 victories)

| Date | Time | | Score | | Set 1 | Set 2 | Set 3 | Set 4 | Set 5 | Total | Report |
|---|---|---|---|---|---|---|---|---|---|---|---|
| 22 Apr | 18:00 | Jastrzębski Węgiel | 3–2 | ZAKSA Kędzierzyn-Koźle | 26–24 | 19–25 | 25–20 | 19–25 | 15–12 | 104–106 | |
| 23 Apr | 18:00 | Jastrzębski Węgiel | 3–2 | ZAKSA Kędzierzyn-Koźle | 25–22 | 25–17 | 19–25 | 24–26 | 22–20 | 115–110 | |
| 26 Apr | 17:00 | ZAKSA Kędzierzyn-Koźle | 3–2 | Jastrzębski Węgiel | 22–25 | 18–25 | 28–26 | 25–22 | 15–12 | 108–110 | |
| 27 Apr | 18:00 | ZAKSA Kędzierzyn-Koźle | 0–3 | Jastrzębski Węgiel | 16–25 | 20–25 | 20–25 | | | 56–75 | |

==== Finals ====
- (to 3 victories)

| Date | Time | | Score | | Set 1 | Set 2 | Set 3 | Set 4 | Set 5 | Total | Report |
|---|---|---|---|---|---|---|---|---|---|---|---|
| 22 Apr | 18:00 | Asseco Resovia | 2–3 | PGE Skra Bełchatów | 31–29 | 20–25 | 20–25 | 25–22 | 12–15 | 108–116 | |
| 23 Apr | 20:00 | Asseco Resovia | 0–3 | PGE Skra Bełchatów | 24–26 | 17–25 | 15–25 | | | 56–76 | |
| 27 Apr | 14:45 | PGE Skra Bełchatów | 3–0 | Asseco Resovia | 25–17 | 25–20 | 25–18 | | | 75–55 | |

== Final standings ==
| Qualified for the 2014–15 CEV Champions League |
| Qualified for the 2014–15 CEV Cup |

| Rank | Team |
|---|---|
| 1st place, gold medalist(s) | PGE Skra Bełchatów |
| 2nd place, silver medalist(s) | Asseco Resovia |
| 3rd place, bronze medalist(s) | Jastrzębski Węgiel |
| 4 | ZAKSA Kędzierzyn-Koźle |
| 5 | Indykpol AZS Olsztyn |
| 6 | AZS Politechnika Warszawska |
| 7 | Cerrad Czarni Radom |
| 8 | Effector Kielce |
| 9 | Transfer Bydgoszcz |
| 10 | Lotos Trefl Gdańsk |
| 11 | AZS Częstochowa |
| 12 | BBTS Bielsko-Biała |

2014 Polish Champions

8th title

== Squads ==
Asseco Resovia
| No. | Name | Date of birth | Height | Position |
|---|---|---|---|---|
| 1 | (Poland) Dawid Konarski | 31 August 1989 | 1.98 m (6 ft 6 in) | opposite |
| 2 | (United States) Paul Lotman | 3 November 1985 | 2.00 m (6 ft 7 in) | outside hitter |
| 3 | (Poland) Wojciech Grzyb | 4 January 1981 | 2.05 m (6 ft 9 in) | middle blocker |
| 4 | (Poland) Piotr Nowakowski | 18 December 1987 | 2.05 m (6 ft 9 in) | middle blocker |
| 5 | (Czech Republic) Lukáš Ticháček | 12 January 1982 | 1.93 m (6 ft 4 in) | setter |
| 6 | (Poland) Grzegorz Kosok | 2 March 1986 | 2.05 m (6 ft 9 in) | middle blocker |
| 7 | (Poland) Aleh Akhrem | 12 March 1983 | 1.94 m (6 ft 4 in) | outside hitter |
| 10 | (Germany) Jochen Schöps | 8 October 1983 | 2.00 m (6 ft 7 in) | opposite |
| 11 | (Poland) Fabian Drzyzga | 3 January 1990 | 1.96 m (6 ft 5 in) | setter |
| 12 | (Poland) Łukasz Perłowski | 3 April 1984 | 2.04 m (6 ft 8 in) | middle blocker |
| 13 | (Hungary) Péter Veres | 22 February 1979 | 2.00 m (6 ft 7 in) | outside hitter |
| 15 | (Poland) Mateusz Masłowski | 13 June 1997 | 1.85 m (6 ft 1 in) | libero |
| 16 | (Poland) Krzysztof Ignaczak | 15 May 1978 | 1.88 m (6 ft 2 in) | libero |
| 17 | (Bulgaria) Nikolay Penchev | 22 May 1992 | 1.96 m (6 ft 5 in) | outside hitter |
| Head coach: | | (Poland) Andrzej Kowal | | |

AZS Częstochowa
| No. | Name | Date of birth | Height | Position |
|---|---|---|---|---|
| 1 | (Poland) Bartosz Bednorz | 25 July 1994 | 2.01 m (6 ft 7 in) | outside hitter |
| 2 | (Poland) Mariusz Marcyniak | 5 March 1992 | 2.06 m (6 ft 9 in) | middle blocker |
| 6 | (Poland) Dawid Murek | 24 July 1977 | 1.95 m (6 ft 5 in) | outside hitter |
| 7 | (Poland) Michał Kaczyński | 6 February 1993 | 2.00 m (6 ft 7 in) | opposite |
| 8 | (Poland) Damian Zygmunt | 4 June 1994 | 1.97 m (6 ft 6 in) | middle blocker |
| 10 | (Poland) Miłosz Hebda | 11 March 1991 | 2.06 m (6 ft 9 in) | outside hitter |
| 11 | (Czech Republic) Jakub Veselý | 2 September 1986 | 2.06 m (6 ft 9 in) | middle blocker |
| 12 | (Poland) Wojciech Kaźmierczak | 11 June 1982 | 0 m (0 in) | middle blocker |
| 13 | (Poland) Konrad Buczek | 17 February 1994 | 1.90 m (6 ft 3 in) | setter |
| 14 | (Poland) Marcin Janusz | 31 July 1994 | 1.95 m (6 ft 5 in) | setter |
| 15 | (Poland) Michał Kozłowski | 16 February 1985 | 1.91 m (6 ft 3 in) | setter |
| 16 | (Poland) Kacper Piechocki | 17 December 1995 | 1.85 m (6 ft 1 in) | libero |
| 17 | (Poland) Jakub Bik | 17 February 1992 | 1.83 m (6 ft 0 in) | libero |
| 18 | (Poland) Michał Bąkiewicz | 22 March 1981 | 1.97 m (6 ft 6 in) | outside hitter |
| Head coach: | | (Slovakia) Marek Kardoš | | |

AZS Politechnika Warszawska
| No. | Name | Date of birth | Height | Position |
|---|---|---|---|---|
| 1 | (Poland) Maciej Stępień | 22 June 1994 | 1.93 m (6 ft 4 in) | setter |
| 2 | (Poland) Maciej Olenderek | 16 October 1992 | 1.78 m (5 ft 10 in) | libero |
| 4 | (Poland) Maciej Pawliński | 2 February 1983 | 1.93 m (6 ft 4 in) | outside hitter |
| 5 | (Poland) Marcin Nowak | 17 October 1975 | 2.15 m (7 ft 1 in) | middle blocker |
| 9 | (Poland) Paweł Adamajtis | 30 August 1990 | 1.99 m (6 ft 6 in) | opposite |
| 10 | (Slovakia) Juraj Zaťko | 5 June 1987 | 1.90 m (6 ft 3 in) | setter |
| 11 | (Bulgaria) Ivan Kolev | 2 January 1987 | 2.00 m (6 ft 7 in) | outside hitter |
| 12 | (Poland) Artur Szalpuk | 20 March 1995 | 2.01 m (6 ft 7 in) | outside hitter |
| 13 | (Poland) Paweł Kaczorowski | 12 December 1987 | 2.00 m (6 ft 7 in) | outside hitter |
| 14 | (Poland) Michał Potera | 6 March 1988 | 1.83 m (6 ft 0 in) | libero |
| 15 | (Poland) Przemysław Smoliński | 27 November 1992 | 2.01 m (6 ft 7 in) | middle blocker |
| 16 | (Poland) Dawid Gunia | 1 January 1987 | 2.03 m (6 ft 8 in) | middle blocker |
| 17 | (Poland) Mateusz Sacharewicz | 23 October 1989 | 1.98 m (6 ft 6 in) | middle blocker |
| 18 | (Romania) Adrian Radu Gontariu | 14 May 1984 | 2.05 m (6 ft 9 in) | opposite |
| 20 | (Poland) Paweł Woicki | 19 June 1983 | 1.82 m (6 ft 0 in) | setter |
| Head coach: | | (Poland) Jakub Bednaruk | | |

BBTS Bielsko-Biała
| No. | Name | Date of birth | Height | Position |
|---|---|---|---|---|
| 1 | (Poland) Maciej Fijałek | 7 August 1982 | 1.86 m (6 ft 1 in) | setter |
| 2 | (Poland) Przemysław Czauderna | 21 May 1992 | 1.83 m (6 ft 0 in) | libero |
| 3 | (Serbia) Miloš Stojković | 17 May 1987 | 2.01 m (6 ft 7 in) | outside hitter |
| 4 | (Poland) Wojciech Siek | 10 May 1994 | 2.05 m (6 ft 9 in) | middle blocker |
| 5 | (Poland) Kamil Kwasowski | 13 September 1990 | 1.97 m (6 ft 6 in) | setter |
| 6 | (Slovakia) Martin Vlk | 9 July 1984 | 1.91 m (6 ft 3 in) | outside hitter |
| 7 | (Poland) Michał Błoński | 24 March 1987 | 1.87 m (6 ft 2 in) | outside hitter |
| 8 | (Poland) Tomasz Kalembka | 30 June 1991 | 2.05 m (6 ft 9 in) | middle blocker |
| 9 | (Argentina) José Luis González | 27 December 1984 | 2.06 m (6 ft 9 in) | opposite |
| 10 | (Poland) Bartosz Buniak | 8 October 1985 | 0 m (0 in) | middle blocker |
| 12 | (Poland) Grzegorz Kokociński | 18 September 1981 | 1.96 m (6 ft 5 in) | middle blocker |
| 15 | (Belarus) Maksim Akimenko | 2 May 1988 | 2.00 m (6 ft 7 in) | opposite |
| 17 | (Poland) Adam Swaczyna | 4 May 1989 | 1.76 m (5 ft 9 in) | libero |
| 18 | (Poland) Bartosz Bućko | 6 January 1995 | 0 m (0 in) | outside hitter |
| Head coach: | | (Poland) Janusz Bułkowski → (Poland) Wiktor Krebok | | |

Cerrad Czarni Radom
| No. | Name | Date of birth | Height | Position |
|---|---|---|---|---|
| 1 | (Poland) Bartłomiej Bołądź | 28 September 1994 | 2.04 m (6 ft 8 in) | opposite |
| 2 | (Poland) Michał Ostrowski | 29 March 1990 | 2.03 m (6 ft 8 in) | middle blocker |
| 3 | (Poland) Rafał Faryna | 28 September 1994 | 2.00 m (6 ft 7 in) | opposite |
| 4 | (Poland) Jakub Radomski | 16 March 1988 | 2.03 m (6 ft 8 in) | outside hitter |
| 5 | (Poland) Bartłomiej Grzechnik | 8 February 1993 | 2.00 m (6 ft 7 in) | middle blocker |
| 6 | (Poland) Bartłomiej Neroj | 22 November 1984 | 2.00 m (6 ft 7 in) | setter |
| 7 | (Poland) Jakub Wachnik | 16 February 1993 | 2.02 m (6 ft 8 in) | outside hitter |
| 8 | (Germany) Dirk Westphal | 31 January 1986 | 2.03 m (6 ft 8 in) | outside hitter |
| 9 | (Poland) Adam Kowalski | 16 September 1994 | 1.80 m (5 ft 11 in) | libero |
| 10 | (Netherlands) Wytze Kooistra | 3 June 1982 | 2.09 m (6 ft 10 in) | opposite |
| 11 | (Poland) Łukasz Zugaj | 27 January 1993 | 1.92 m (6 ft 4 in) | setter |
| 12 | (Canada) Adam Kaminski | 27 May 1984 | 2.04 m (6 ft 8 in) | middle blocker |
| 14 | (Poland) Kamil Gutkowski | 15 October 1986 | 1.94 m (6 ft 4 in) | outside hitter |
| 15 | (Poland) Paweł Filipowicz | 7 May 1992 | 1.89 m (6 ft 2 in) | libero |
| 16 | (Slovakia) Jozef Piovarči | 9 November 1984 | 2.08 m (6 ft 10 in) | middle blocker |
| Head coach: | | (Poland) Robert Prygiel | | |

Effector Kielce
| No. | Name | Date of birth | Height | Position |
|---|---|---|---|---|
| 1 | (Poland) Sławomir Jungiewicz | 21 June 1989 | 1.96 m (6 ft 5 in) | opposite |
| 2 | (Poland) Bartosz Sufa | 11 August 1987 | 1.86 m (6 ft 1 in) | libero |
| 4 | (Poland) Bartosz Kaczmarek | 17 January 1991 | 1.84 m (6 ft 0 in) | libero |
| 5 | (Poland) Piotr Lipiński | 4 January 1979 | 1.95 m (6 ft 5 in) | setter |
| 7 | (Poland) Piotr Orczyk | 19 March 1993 | 1.98 m (6 ft 6 in) | outside hitter |
| 8 | (Poland) Adrian Staszewski | 31 May 1990 | 1.96 m (6 ft 5 in) | outside hitter |
| 9 | (Argentina) Cristian Poglajen | 14 July 1989 | 1.95 m (6 ft 5 in) | outside hitter |
| 11 | (Poland) Piotr Adamski | 4 December 1991 | 1.95 m (6 ft 5 in) | setter |
| 12 | (Poland) Łukasz Polański | 29 January 1989 | 2.05 m (6 ft 9 in) | middle blocker |
| 13 | (Poland) Adrian Buchowski | 30 September 1991 | 1.94 m (6 ft 4 in) | outside hitter |
| 14 | (Poland) Mariusz Wacek | 3 February 1995 | 2.00 m (6 ft 7 in) | middle blocker |
| 15 | (Poland) Mateusz Bieniek | 5 April 1994 | 2.08 m (6 ft 10 in) | middle blocker |
| 16 | (Poland) Nikodem Wolański | 19 January 1994 | 1.98 m (6 ft 6 in) | setter |
| 17 | (Argentina) Bruno Romanutti | 5 July 1989 | 1.94 m (6 ft 4 in) | opposite |
| 18 | (Poland) Dawid Dryja | 21 July 1992 | 2.01 m (6 ft 7 in) | opposite |
| Head coach: | | (Poland) Dariusz Daszkiewicz | | |

Indykpol AZS Olsztyn
| No. | Name | Date of birth | Height | Position |
|---|---|---|---|---|
| 1 | (Poland) Maciej Dobrowolski | 19 March 1977 | 1.90 m (6 ft 3 in) | setter |
| 3 | (Poland) Michał Żurek | 3 June 1988 | 1.81 m (5 ft 11 in) | libero |
| 4 | (Poland) Bartosz Mariański | 26 May 1992 | 1.87 m (6 ft 2 in) | libero |
| 6 | (Argentina) Pablo Bengolea | 8 May 1986 | 1.98 m (6 ft 6 in) | outside hitter |
| 7 | (Poland) Dariusz Kurmin | 20 June 1980 | 1.97 m (6 ft 6 in) | middle blocker |
| 8 | (Poland) Rafał Buszek | 28 April 1987 | 1.96 m (6 ft 5 in) | outside hitter |
| 10 | (Poland) Grzegorz Szymański | 12 July 1978 | 2.02 m (6 ft 8 in) | opposite |
| 11 | (Poland) Wojciech Sobala | 12 May 1988 | 2.07 m (6 ft 9 in) | middle blocker |
| 13 | (Poland) Piotr Łukasik | 11 July 1994 | 2.08 m (6 ft 10 in) | outside hitter |
| 14 | (Poland) Grzegorz Pająk | 1 January 1987 | 1.96 m (6 ft 5 in) | setter |
| 15 | (Finland) Matti Oivanen | 26 May 1986 | 1.99 m (6 ft 6 in) | middle blocker |
| 16 | (Poland) Piotr Hain | 26 February 1991 | 2.07 m (6 ft 9 in) | middle blocker |
| 17 | (Poland) Bartosz Krzysiek | 19 February 1990 | 2.07 m (6 ft 9 in) | opposite |
| 18 | (Poland) Piotr Łuka | 9 June 1980 | 0 m (0 in) | outside hitter |
| Head coach: | | (Poland) Krzysztof Stelmach | | |

Jastrzębski Węgiel
| No. | Name | Date of birth | Height | Position |
|---|---|---|---|---|
| 1 | (Italy) Michał Łasko | 11 March 1981 | 2.02 m (6 ft 8 in) | opposite |
| 2 | (Poland) Krzysztof Gierczyński | 23 January 1976 | 1.93 m (6 ft 4 in) | outside hitter |
| 3 | (Poland) Jakub Popiwczak | 17 April 1996 | 1.80 m (5 ft 11 in) | libero |
| 4 | (Poland) Radosław Sterna | 26 January 1995 | 2.03 m (6 ft 8 in) | middle blocker |
| 5 | (Slovenia) Alen Pajenk | 23 April 1986 | 2.03 m (6 ft 8 in) | middle blocker |
| 6 | (Poland) Mateusz Malinowski | 6 May 1992 | 1.98 m (6 ft 6 in) | opposite |
| 7 | (Slovakia) Michal Masný | 14 August 1979 | 1.82 m (6 ft 0 in) | setter |
| 8 | (Poland) Konrad Formela | 8 March 1995 | 1.94 m (6 ft 4 in) | outside hitter |
| 9 | (Poland) Patryk Czarnowski | 1 November 1985 | 2.04 m (6 ft 8 in) | middle blocker |
| 10 | (Belgium) Simon Van de Voorde | 19 December 1989 | 2.08 m (6 ft 10 in) | middle blocker |
| 11 | (Canada) Thomas Jarmoc | 19 April 1987 | 1.98 m (6 ft 6 in) | outside hitter |
| 12 | (Poland) Sebastian Matula | 9 April 1995 | 0 m (0 in) | setter |
| 13 | (Poland) Michał Kubiak | 23 February 1988 | 1.92 m (6 ft 4 in) | outside hitter |
| 14 | (Poland) Bartosz Kwolek | 17 July 1997 | 1.93 m (6 ft 4 in) | outside hitter |
| 15 | (Greece) Dmytro Filippov | 4 December 1990 | 1.98 m (6 ft 6 in) | setter |
| 16 | (Poland) Nicolas Maréchal | 4 March 1987 | 1.98 m (6 ft 6 in) | outside hitter |
| 17 | (Netherlands) Rob Bontje | 12 May 1981 | 2.06 m (6 ft 9 in) | middle blocker |
| 18 | (Poland) Damian Wojtaszek | 7 September 1988 | 1.80 m (5 ft 11 in) | libero |
| 19 | (Poland) Krzysztof Pustelnik | 11 October 1995 | 1.95 m (6 ft 5 in) | opposite |
| Head coach: | | (Italy) Lorenzo Bernardi | | |

Lotos Trefl Gdańsk
| No. | Name | Date of birth | Height | Position |
|---|---|---|---|---|
| 1 | (Poland) Wojciech Żaliński | 8 January 1988 | 1.96 m (6 ft 5 in) | outside hitter |
| 2 | (Poland) Michał Zaborowski | 26 April 1993 | 1.75 m (5 ft 9 in) | libero |
| 3 | (Poland) Grzegorz Łomacz | 1 October 1987 | 1.88 m (6 ft 2 in) | setter |
| 4 | (Poland) Przemysław Stępień | 7 February 1994 | 1.85 m (6 ft 1 in) | setter |
| 5 | (Poland) Sławomir Zemlik | 3 November 1992 | 2.00 m (6 ft 7 in) | outside hitter |
| 6 | (Poland) Moustapha M'Baye | 18 September 1992 | 0 m (0 in) | middle blocker |
| 7 | (Poland) Paweł Rusek | 21 January 1983 | 1.83 m (6 ft 0 in) | libero |
| 8 | (Poland) Jakub Jarosz | 10 February 1987 | 1.97 m (6 ft 6 in) | opposite |
| 9 | (Poland) Bartosz Pietruczuk | 26 February 1993 | 1.96 m (6 ft 5 in) | outside hitter |
| 10 | (Poland) Bartosz Gawryszewski | 22 August 1985 | 2.02 m (6 ft 8 in) | middle blocker |
| 11 | (Poland) Maciej Zajder | 31 January 1988 | 0 m (0 in) | middle blocker |
| 12 | (Poland) Artur Ratajczak | 18 September 1990 | 2.06 m (6 ft 9 in) | middle blocker |
| 13 | (Poland) Krzysztof Wierzbowski | 18 July 1988 | 1.97 m (6 ft 6 in) | outside hitter |
| 14 | (Poland) Sławomir Stolc | 23 January 1993 | 0 m (0 in) | outside hitter |
| 15 | (Poland) Bartłomiej Kluth | 20 December 1992 | 2.10 m (6 ft 11 in) | outside hitter |
| 16 | (Poland) Paweł Mikołajczak | 20 June 1988 | 1.95 m (6 ft 5 in) | opposite |
| 17 | (Poland) Robert Milczarek | 28 November 1983 | 1.88 m (6 ft 2 in) | outside hitter |
| 18 | (Poland) Mateusz Czunkiewicz | 16 December 1996 | 0 m (0 in) | libero |
| Head coach: | | (Poland) Radosław Panas | | |

PGE Skra Bełchatów
| No. | Name | Date of birth | Height | Position |
|---|---|---|---|---|
| 2 | (Poland) Mariusz Wlazły | 4 August 1983 | 1.94 m (6 ft 4 in) | opposite |
| 3 | (Poland) Łukasz Pietrzak | 25 July 1995 | 2.03 m (6 ft 8 in) | opposite |
| 4 | (Poland) Daniel Pliński | 10 December 1978 | 2.04 m (6 ft 8 in) | middle blocker |
| 5 | (France) Samuel Tuia | 24 July 1986 | 1.95 m (6 ft 5 in) | outside hitter |
| 6 | (Poland) Karol Kłos | 8 August 1989 | 2.01 m (6 ft 7 in) | middle blocker |
| 7 | (Argentina) Facundo Conte | 25 August 1989 | 1.97 m (6 ft 6 in) | outside hitter |
| 8 | (Poland) Andrzej Wrona | 27 December 1988 | 2.06 m (6 ft 9 in) | middle blocker |
| 9 | (Poland) Maciej Muzaj | 21 May 1994 | 2.08 m (6 ft 10 in) | opposite |
| 10 | (Argentina) Nicolás Uriarte | 21 March 1990 | 1.89 m (6 ft 2 in) | setter |
| 11 | (France) Stéphane Antiga | 3 February 1976 | 2.00 m (6 ft 7 in) | outside hitter |
| 12 | (Poland) Wojciech Włodarczyk | 28 October 1990 | 2.00 m (6 ft 7 in) | outside hitter |
| 15 | (Serbia) Aleksa Brđović | 29 July 1993 | 2.04 m (6 ft 8 in) | setter |
| 16 | (Poland) Paweł Zatorski | 21 June 1990 | 1.84 m (6 ft 0 in) | libero |
| 17 | (Poland) Jędrzej Maćkowiak | 17 October 1992 | 0 m (0 in) | middle blocker |
| 18 | (Poland) Dawid Konieczny | 30 August 1994 | 1.97 m (6 ft 6 in) | outside hitter |
| Head coach: | | (Spain) Miguel Ángel Falasca | | |

Transfer Bydgoszcz
| No. | Name | Date of birth | Height | Position |
|---|---|---|---|---|
| 1 | (Cuba) Yasser Portuondo | 2 February 1983 | 1.95 m (6 ft 5 in) | outside hitter |
| 2 | (Poland) Bartosz Filipiak | 27 February 1994 | 1.97 m (6 ft 6 in) | opposite |
| 3 | (Poland) Marcin Wika | 9 November 1983 | 1.94 m (6 ft 4 in) | outside hitter |
| 4 | (Poland) Wojciech Jurkiewicz | 21 June 1977 | 2.05 m (6 ft 9 in) | middle blocker |
| 5 | (Poland) Miłosz Zniszczoł | 2 July 1986 | 2.01 m (6 ft 7 in) | middle blocker |
| 6 | (Cuba) Maikel Salas | 22 April 1981 | 1.90 m (6 ft 3 in) | setter |
| 7 | (Poland) Marcin Waliński | 24 October 1990 | 1.95 m (6 ft 5 in) | outside hitter |
| 8 | (Poland) Bartosz Janeczek | 12 July 1987 | 1.98 m (6 ft 6 in) | opposite |
| 9 | (Poland) Łukasz Wiese | 24 March 1993 | 1.95 m (6 ft 5 in) | outside hitter |
| 10 | (Poland) Paweł Woicki | 19 June 1983 | 1.82 m (6 ft 0 in) | setter |
| 11 | (Poland) Tomasz Wieczorek | 8 May 1982 | 1.98 m (6 ft 6 in) | middle blocker |
| 12 | (Poland) Jan Nowakowski | 17 May 1994 | 2.02 m (6 ft 8 in) | middle blocker |
| 13 | (Poland) Piotr Sieńko | 8 December 1993 | 1.96 m (6 ft 5 in) | setter |
| 14 | (United States) Carson Clark | 20 January 1989 | 1.96 m (6 ft 5 in) | opposite |
| 15 | (Poland) Paweł Stysiał | 30 January 1997 | 1.85 m (6 ft 1 in) | libero |
| 16 | (Poland) Błażej Płomiński | 21 May 1995 | 1.87 m (6 ft 2 in) | setter |
| 17 | (United States) Garrett Muagututia | 26 February 1988 | 1.96 m (6 ft 5 in) | outside hitter |
| 18 | (Poland) Tomasz Bonisławski | 22 January 1991 | 1.88 m (6 ft 2 in) | libero |
| Head coach: | | (Belgium) Vital Heynen | | |

ZAKSA Kędzierzyn-Koźle
| No. | Name | Date of birth | Height | Position |
|---|---|---|---|---|
| 3 | (Poland) Dominik Witczak | 2 January 1983 | 1.98 m (6 ft 6 in) | opposite |
| 5 | (Poland) Paweł Zagumny | 18 October 1977 | 2.00 m (6 ft 7 in) | setter |
| 6 | (Canada) Daniel Lewis | 3 April 1976 | 1.89 m (6 ft 2 in) | outside hitter |
| 7 | (Poland) Grzegorz Pilarz | 12 February 1980 | 1.88 m (6 ft 2 in) | setter |
| 8 | (Poland) Yuriy Gladyr | 8 July 1984 | 2.02 m (6 ft 8 in) | middle blocker |
| 9 | (Poland) Łukasz Wiśniewski | 3 February 1989 | 1.98 m (6 ft 6 in) | middle blocker |
| 10 | (Poland) Wojciech Ferens | 5 April 1991 | 1.94 m (6 ft 4 in) | outside hitter |
| 11 | (Netherlands) Dick Kooy | 3 December 1987 | 2.02 m (6 ft 8 in) | outside hitter |
| 12 | (Poland) Grzegorz Bociek | 6 June 1991 | 2.07 m (6 ft 9 in) | opposite |
| 15 | (Poland) Piotr Gacek | 16 September 1978 | 1.85 m (6 ft 1 in) | libero |
| 16 | (Poland) Michał Ruciak | 22 August 1983 | 1.90 m (6 ft 3 in) | outside hitter |
| 17 | (Poland) Marcin Możdżonek | 9 February 1985 | 2.11 m (6 ft 11 in) | middle blocker |
| 18 | (Canada) Dustin Schneider | 27 February 1985 | 0 m (0 in) | setter |
| Head coach: | | (Poland) Sebastian Świderski | | |

== See also ==
- 2013–14 CEV Champions League
- 2013–14 CEV Cup
