= Michał Filip =

Polish volleyball player (born 1994)

Personal information
- Full name: Michał Filip
- Nationality: (Poland) Polish
- Born: 31 August 1994 (age 32); Rzeszów, Poland
- Height: 1.97 m (6 ft 6 in)
- Weight: 100 kg (220 lb)
- Spike: 345 cm (136 in)

Volleyball information
- Position: Opposite
- Current club: (Turkey) Develi Belediyespor

Career
Years	Teams
2013–2014; 2014–2017; 2017–2020; 2020; 2020–	(Poland) Asseco Resovia (Poland) AZS Politechnika Warszawska (Poland) Czarni Radom (Poland) BKS Visła Bydgoszcz (Poland) Stal Nysa
Honours
Men's volleyball
Representing Poland
European League
Bronze medal – third place	2015 Poland

Michał Filip (born 31 August 1994) is a Polish volleyball player, a member of the Turkish club Develi Belediyespor, Efeler Ligi.

== Career ==
In the 2013/2014 season, they won the Polish SuperCup and the silver medal of the Polish Championship 2013/2014 after losing the final (0-3 in matches, to three wins) against PGE Skra Bełchatów. He moved to AZS Politechnika Warszawska on loan from Asseco Resovia Rzeszów in 2014. He extended his contract on following 2 seasons. After 3 seasons his contract with club from Warsaw was not renewed. On May 2, 2017 he moved to Cerrad Czarni Radom. Filip debuted in Polish national team B in July 2015. On August 14, 2015 he achieved first medal as national team player – bronze of European League. His national team won 3rd place match with Estonia (3–0).

== Sporting achievements ==
=== Clubs ===
- National championships
  - 2013/2014 Polish SuperCup, with Asseco Resovia
  - 2013/2014 Polish Championship, with Asseco Resovia
