= Młoda Liga =

- Sport: Men's Volleyball
- Founded: 15 June 2010
- Folded: 2017
- No. of teams: 14
- Country: Poland
- Last champion: Czarni Radom

Młoda Liga (lit. 'The Young League') was the league of men's under-23 volleyball in Poland, for volleyball clubs located in this country. It was overseen by Profesjonalna Liga Piłki Siatkowej S.A. (PLPS S.A.). The regular season was followed by playoffs, with the winner earning the Polish Championship U23 (Polish: Mistrzostwo Polski do lat 23). Dissolved in 2017.

== Medalists ==
Year	Gold	Silver	Bronze
2011	Asseco Resovia Rzeszów	PGE Skra Bełchatów	Delecta Bydgoszcz
2012	Delecta Bydgoszcz	PGE Skra Bełchatów	Asseco Resovia Rzeszów
2013	Lotos Trefl Gdańsk	SMS PZPS Spała	ZAKSA Kędzierzyn-Koźle
2014	SMS PZPS Spała	Asseco Resovia Rzeszów	Lotos Trefl Gdańsk
2015	Czarni Radom	ZAKSA Kędzierzyn-Koźle	Transfer Bydgoszcz
2016	Jastrzębski Węgiel	Czarni Radom	Lotos Trefl Gdańsk
2017	Czarni Radom	BBTS Bielsko-Biała	MOS Wola Warszawa

== See also ==
- Volleyball in Poland
- PlusLiga
