= Igor Gniecki =

Polish volleyball player (born 2002)

Personal information
- Nationality: Polish
- Born: 16 April 2002 (age 24)
- Hometown: Jastrzębie-Zdrój
- Height: 6 ft 4 in (1.93 m)
- Weight: 205 lb (93 kg)
- Spike: 130 in (330 cm)
- Block: 120 in (310 cm)

Volleyball information
- Position: Setter
- Current club: VCA Amstetten NÖ

Career
Years	Teams
2018–2021 2019–2021; 08.10.2021–2022; 2022–2023; 12.10.2023–2024; 2024-Now	(Poland) Eco-Team AZS Stoelzle Częstochowa (Poland) SMS PZPS Spała (Poland) LUK Lublin (Switzerland) TSV Jona (Poland) Czarni Radom (Austria) VCA Amstetten NÖ

Igor Gniecki (born on 16 April 2002 in Jastrzębie-Zdrój) is a Polish volleyball player who plays as a setter.

== Sporting achievements ==
=== Clubs ===
Polish Championship U19:

- 2019

=== National team ===
FIVB Men's U21 World Championship:

- 2021
