= Michał Kędzierski =

Polish volleyball player (born 1994)

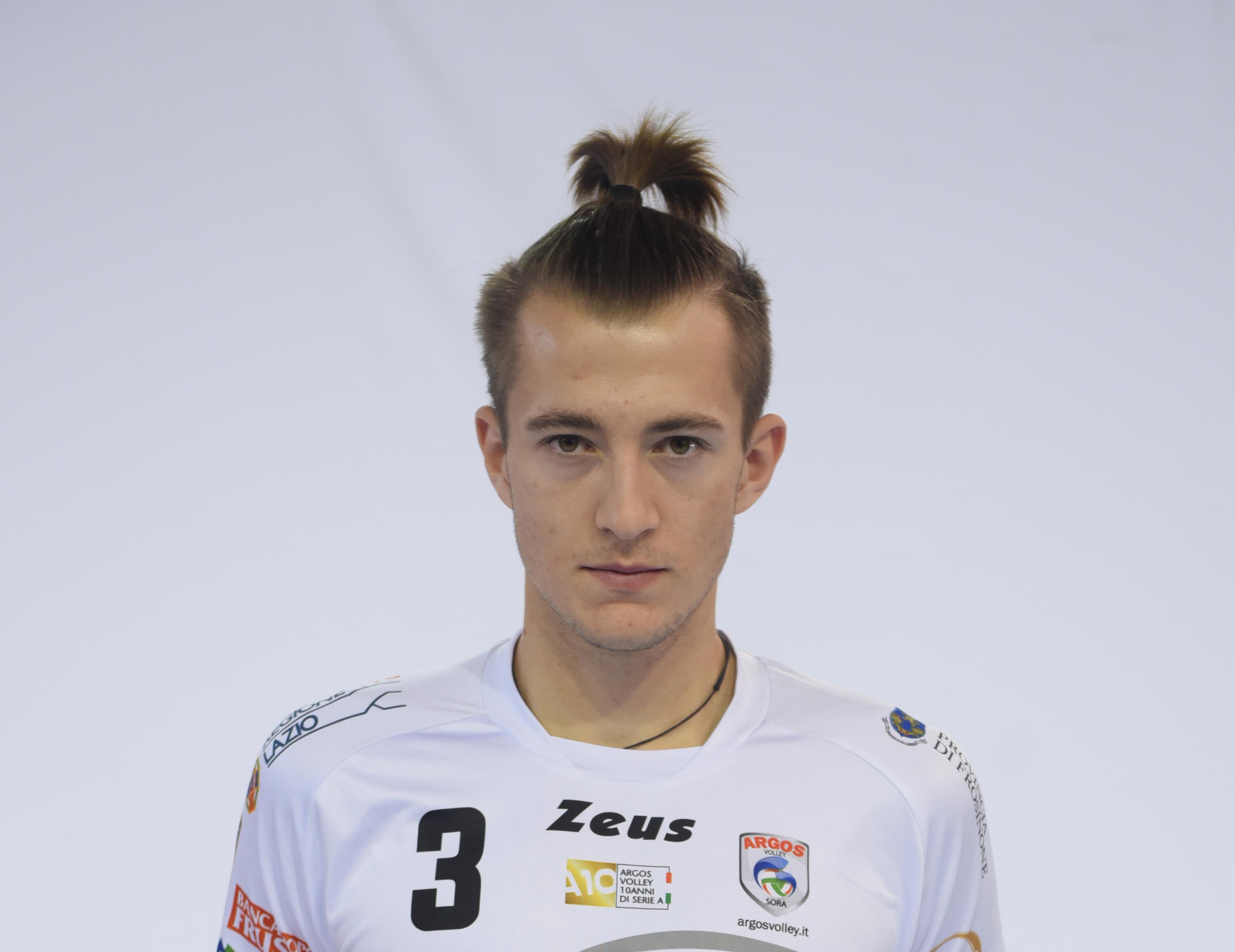
- Kędzierski in 2019

Personal information
- Born: 9 August 1994 (age 32); Rzeszów, Poland
- Height: 1.94 m (6 ft 4 in)
- Weight: 83 kg (183 lb)
- Spike: 345 cm (136 in)

Volleyball information
- Position: Setter

Career
| Years | Teams |
|---|---|
| 2013–2014; 2014–2015; 2015–2016; 2016–2017; 2017–2018; 2018–2019; 2019–2022; 2022–2024; 2024 | Asseco Resovia; Czarni Radom; Effector Kielce; Czarni Radom; Asseco Resovia; Argos Volley; Czarni Radom; Asseco Resovia; Gas Sales Piacenza |
Honours
Men's volleyball
Representing Poland
European League
| Bronze medal – third place | 2015 Poland |

Michał Kędzierski (born 9 August 1994) is a Polish professional volleyball player.

== Career ==
=== National team ===
He took part in the 1st edition of the European Games in 2015. In the same year, he won the European League bronze medal, after defeating Estonia in the 3rd place match (3–0).

== Honours ==
=== Club ===
- CEV Cup
  - 2023–24 – with Asseco Resovia

=== Universiade ===
- 2019 Summer Universiade
