= Radosław Zbierski =

Polish volleyball player

Personal information
- Nationality: (Poland) Polish
- Born: 14 April 1988 (age 38); Kędzierzyn-Koźle
- Height: 6 ft 3 in (1.91 m)
- Weight: 192 lb (87 kg)
- Spike: 136 in (345 cm)
- Block: 124 in (315 cm)

Volleyball information
- Position: Libero

Career
Years	Teams
2006–2007; 2007–2008; 2008–2011; 2011–2012; 2012–2013; 2013–2014; 2014–2015; 2015–01.02.2016; 14.01.2018–2018	(Poland) Joker Piła (Poland) AZS UAM Poznań (Poland) Joker Piła (Poland) KPS Siedlce (Poland) Jastrzębski Węgiel (Poland) KPS Siedlce (Poland) Aluron Virtu Warta Zawiercie (Poland) Cerrad Czarni Radom (Poland) KPS Siedlce

Radosław Zbierski (born 14 April 1988 in Kędzierzyn-Koźle) is a Polish volleyball player, playing in position libero.

== Sporting achievements ==
=== Clubs ===
Polish Championship I League:

- 2007, 2014

Polish Championship:

- 2013
