= Adam Kowalski =

Polish volleyball player (born 1994)

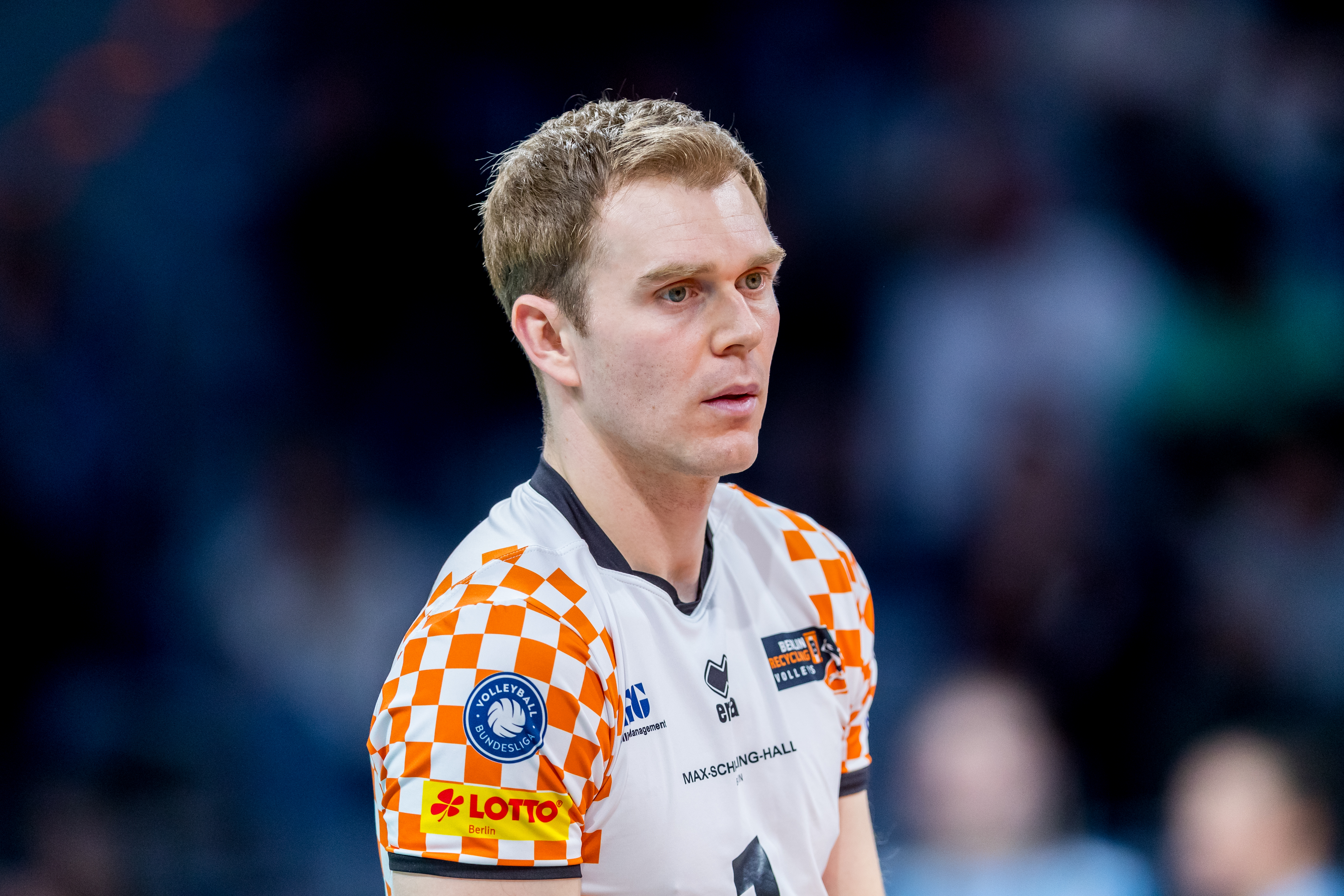
- Kowalski as Berlin Recycling Volleys player

Personal information
- Born: 16 September 1994 (age 32) Częstochowa, Poland
- Height: 1.80 m (5 ft 11 in)
- Weight: 74 kg (163 lb)

Volleyball information
- Position: Libero
- Current club: Skra Bełchatów
- Number: 16

Career
- Years: Team
- 2013–2016 2016–2017 2017–2019 2019–2025 2025–2026 2026–: Czarni Radom; AZS Częstochowa; Łuczniczka Bydgoszcz; Berlin Recycling Volleys; Stal Nysa; Skra Bełchatów

Adam Kowalski (born 16 September 1994) is a Polish professional volleyball player who plays as a libero for Skra Bełchatów.

== Career ==
=== National team ===
On 2 April 2015, he was appointed to the Polish national team by head coach Stephane Antiga. After the training camp in Spała he went to team B of Polish national team led by Andrzej Kowal. He took part in the 1st edition of the European Games in 2015.

== Honours ==
=== Club ===
- Domestic
  - 2020–21, 2021–22, 2022–23, 2023–24, 2024–25 German Championship (x5), with Berlin Recycling Volleys
  - 2019–20, 2022–23, 2023–24, 2024–25 German Cup (x4), with Berlin Recycling Volleys
  - 2019–20, 2020–21, 2021–22, 2022–23, 2023–24, 2024–25 German SuperCup (x6), with Berlin Recycling Volleys
