= Adam Kaminski =

Canadian volleyball player (born 1984)

Personal information
- Nationality: Canadian
- Born: May 27, 1984 (age 42); Chatham-Kent
- Height: 2.05 m (6 ft 9 in)
- Weight: 90 kg (198 lb)
- Spike: 355 cm (140 in)
- Block: 335 cm (132 in)

Volleyball information
- Position: Middle blocker

Career
Years	Teams
2003-2008; 2008-2010; 2010-2012; 2013; 2013-2014	(Canada) University of Alberta (Slovenia) OK Salonit Anhovo (Poland) Fart Kielce (Czech Republic) VK Dukla Liberec (Poland) Cerrad Czarni Radom

Adam Kaminski (born May 27, 1984) is a Canadian volleyball player, a member of the Canada men's national volleyball team.

== Sporting achievements ==
=== Clubs ===
Canada West Mens Volleyball:

- 2005, 2006, 2008
- 2004

U Sports Championship:

- 2005, 2008
- 2004, 2006, 2007

Slovenian Championship:

- 2009, 2010

Czech Cup:

- 2013

Czech Championship:

- 2013

=== National team ===
Pan-American Cup:

- 2008
- 2011
