= Igor Grobelny =

Belgian–Polish volleyball player (born 1993)

Personal information
- Full name: Igor Oskar Grobelny
- Nationality: Belgian, Polish
- Born: 8 June 1993 (age 33); Radom, Poland
- Height: 1.94 m (6 ft 4 in)
- Weight: 77 kg (170 lb)
- Spike: 360 cm (142 in)
- Block: 330 cm (130 in)

Volleyball information
- Position: Outside hitter
- Current club: Skra Bełchatów
- Number: 9

Career
Years	Teams
2012–2014; 2014–2016; 2016–2017; 2017–2018; 2018–2019; 2019–2024; 2024–2026; 2026–	Volley Aalst; Czarni Radom; Cuprum Lubin; Hypo Tirol Alpenvolleys Haching; Cuprum Lubin; Projekt Warsaw; ZAKSA Kędzierzyn-Koźle; Skra Bełchatów

National team
2018–2019	Belgium

Igor Oskar Grobelny (born 8 June 1993) is a Belgian–Polish professional volleyball player who plays as an outside hitter for Skra Bełchatów. Grobelny is a former member of the Belgium national team.

== Personal life ==
He has a younger sister, Kaja. Their father, Dariusz was also a volleyball player.

== Honours ==
=== Club ===
- CEV Challenge Cup
  - 2023–24 – with Projekt Warsaw
