= Olivier Faucher =

Canadian volleyball player (born 1984)

Personal information
- Born: September 14, 1984 (age 42)
- Hometown: Plessisville, Quebec, Canada
- Height: 1.91 m (6 ft 3 in)
- Weight: 85 kg (187 lb)
- Spike: 330 cm (130 in)
- Block: 305 cm (120 in)
- Education: Université Laval

Volleyball information
- Position: Setter

Career
Years	Teams
2004–2009; 2011; 2011–2012; 2012–2013	Laval Rouge et Or; SL Benfica; Saint-Nazaire VBA; Pärnu VK

National team
2007–2013	Canada
Honours
Men's volleyball
Representing Canada
Pan American Cup
Bronze medal – third place	2009 Chiapas
Bronze medal – third place	2011 Gatineau
- Last updated: 2024-08-07

Olivier Faucher (born September 14, 1984) is a Canadian former professional volleyball player who played for the Canada men's national volleyball team for six years, representing Canada at the 2010 FIVB Volleyball Men's World Championship.

== Career ==
Faucher played university volleyball at Université Laval for the Laval Rouge et Or from 2004 to 2009.

He signed his first professional contract with Portuguese club SL Benfica in January 2011, replacing the injured Dustin Schneider. Faucher went on to play for French club Saint-Nazaire VBA and Estonian club Pärnu VK, before retiring in 2013.

Faucher is currently the head coach of the Rouge et Or women's volleyball team.
