= Czarni Radom =

Polish volleyball club

Enea Czarni Radom
- Full name: WKS Czarni Radom; Spółka Akcyjna
- Short name: WKS Czarni
- Founded: 1921; 104 years ago
- Ground: Hala RCS ul. Struga 63; 26–600 Radom (Capacity: 3,700)
- Chairman: Dariusz Fryszkowski
- Manager: Jakub Bednaruk
- Captain: Alexander Berger
- League: PlusLiga
- Website: Club home page

Uniforms
Home	Away

WKS Czarni Radom, officially known for sponsorship reasons as Enea Czarni Radom, is a professional men's volleyball team based in Radom in central Poland. Founded in 1921 as a football club, the club had many sections in the past, however since 1997 only the volleyball section has remained.

Czarni Radom team won the Polish Cup in 1999 and two Polish Championship bronze medals in 1994 and 1995. The club ceased to exist in 2003 and was reactivated in 2007. In 2013, after 11 years of absence, the team was finally promoted to PlusLiga.

== Honours ==
- Polish Cup

Winners (1): 1998–99

== Team history ==
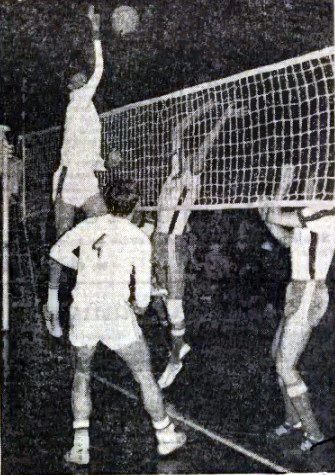
Czarni Radom players during a match in the 1982–83 season

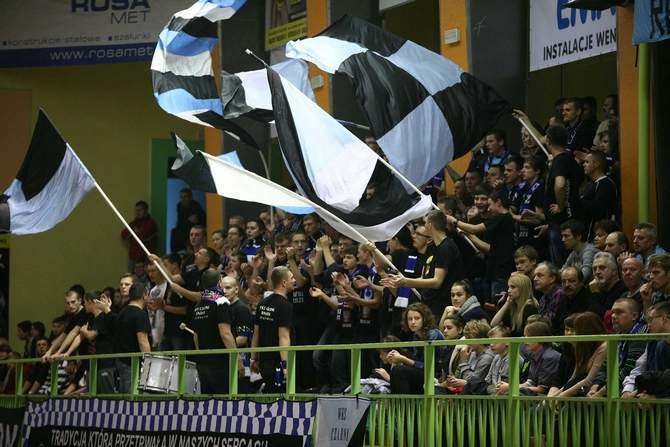
Czarni Radom fans 2012

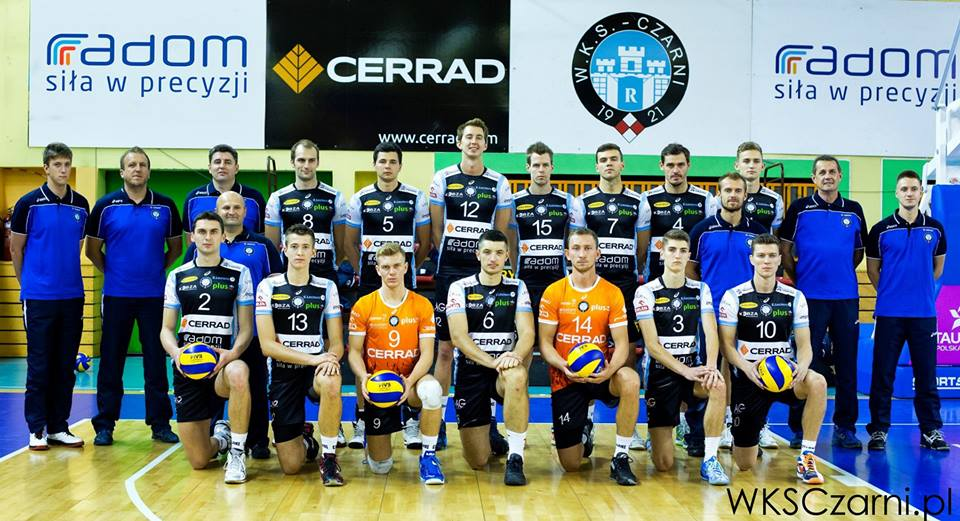
Czarni Radom 2014/15

Founding of the club took place in 1921 after the split in the football team "Kordian" belonging to Radomskie Towarzystwo Sportowe (Radom Sports Association). Some athletes left from the structure of the association to form a club Czarni Radom. 2 years later the club, gaining more and more sympathy of the 72nd Infantry Regiment stationed in Radom transformed into a Military Sports Club – Wojskowy Klub Sportowy "Czarni". Initially, its work was confined only to the football section. Over time, the club has expanded its structure. However, bringing a volleyball section to life was achieved later and underwent various difficulties.

In 1957, the club's management has decided to create a men's volleyball section. A team that was based on cadets of the Żwirko and Wigura Military Aviation School in Radom started in league one season later. The team took second place in the championship and has withdrawn from the competition.

In 1979 a team led by coach Jan Skorżyński was promoted to the second level league. Historical success was achieved by the team based on its own pupils, Radom high school students and a few soldiers doing military service in Radom. The team consisted of: Andrzej Skorupa, Tomasz Gałczyński, Ryszard Laskowski, Ryszard Pisarek, Jarosław Trochimiuk, Zbigniew Janikowski, Witold Poinc, Janusz Tomaszewski, Robert Mach, Jacek Gagacki, Roman Murdza and Ryszard Kotala.

In 1984 Czarni Radom team achieved historical promotion to the Ekstraklasa, in which played continuously for eighteen seasons. In 1994, coached by Valery Jarużnyj, they won the first ever bronze medal of Polish championship. The success repeated a year later and then the coach of the team was Jacek Skrok.

On 26 September 1997, the whole club was transformed into a volleyball club and changed its name to Warka Strong Club WKS Czarni Radom. In 1999 Czarni Radom players witch coach Edward Skorek won Polish Cup. In season 1999/2000 they played in CEV Cup Winners' Cup.

On 14 April 2002 Czarni Radom team for the first time in its history was relegated to Polish second league. One year later, the club ceased to exist.

In 2007 the club was recreated. In the 2011–12 season, Czarni Radom players, coached by Wojciech Stępień were finally promoted to the I liga (second level league) and in the next season to PlusLiga.

The first steps to create a Czarni Radom fan club supporters started at the beginning of 1999. In 2003–07, there were supporters without a club. They were conflicted with Jadar Radom because the club did not continue the history and tradition of Czarni Radom that had gone bankrupt. Since 2005 they were not allowed to watch any match of Jadar. This caused conflict among the "new" Jadar fans and the "old" Czarni fans who wanted Jadar to continue the legacy of the dissolved Czarni club. In the end due to the conflict Czarni started attending the reserve Jadar matches and then reformed the original club in 2007 on the basis of them.

== Team ==
As of 2023–24 season

=== Coaching staff ===
Occupation	Name
Head coach	(Poland) Paweł Woicki
Team manager	(Poland) Michał Ruciak
Physical preparation coach	(Poland) Kuba Szyszka

=== Players ===
No.	Name	Date of birth	Position
2	(Poland) Michał Ostrowski	29 March 1990 (age 34)	middle blocker
5	(Canada) Brodie Hofer	27 April 2000 (age 24)	outside hitter
6	(Poland) Wojciech Kraj	2 April 2000 (age 24)	middle blocker
7	(Poland) Rafał Buszek	28 April 1987 (age 37)	outside hitter
9	(Serbia) Vuk Todorović	23 April 1998 (age 26)	setter
10	(Poland) Mateusz Biernat	19 May 1992 (age 32)	setter
12	(Poland) Konrad Formela	8 March 1995 (age 30)	outside hitter
13	(Poland) Tomasz Piotrowski	2 September 1997 (age 27)	outside hitter
14	(Serbia) Nikola Meljanac	15 January 1999 (age 26)	opposite
15	(Poland) Bartosz Gomułka	30 May 2002 (age 22)	opposite
18	(Poland) Maciej Nowowsiak	20 September 2001 (age 23)	libero
20	(Poland) Dominik Teklak	17 March 2000 (age 25)	libero
21	(Poland) Wiktor Rajsner	27 November 1999 (age 25)	middle blocker
24	(Poland) Mateusz Kufka	1 January 2003 (age 22)	middle blocker
42	(Poland) Igor Gniecki	16 April 2002 (age 22)	setter

Roster of Season 2022/2023
No.	Name	Date of birth	Position
1	(Poland) Damian Schulz	26 February 1990 (age 35)	opposite
2	(Poland) Michał Ostrowski	29 March 1990 (age 34)	middle blocker
3	(Poland) Wiktor Nowak	21 May 1999 (age 25)	setter
4	(Estonia) Timo Tammemaa	18 November 1991 (age 33)	middle blocker
5	(Brazil) Maurício Borges	4 February 1989 (age 36)	outside hitter
6	(Poland) Piotr Łukasik	27 July 1994 (age 30)	outside hitter
7	(Poland) Bartłomiej Lemański	19 March 1996 (age 29)	middle blocker
8	(Poland) Paweł Rusin	5 March 1992 (age 33)	outside hitter
9	(Poland) Daniel Gąsior	9 January 1995 (age 30)	opposite
11	(Poland) Sebastian Warda	18 January 1989 (age 36)	middle blocker
13	(Poland) Mateusz Masłowski	13 June 1997 (age 27)	libero
15	(United States) Matt West	1 October 1993 (age 31)	setter
17	(Poland) Bartosz Firszt	19 March 1999 (age 26)	outside hitter
18	(Poland) Maciej Nowowsiak	20 September 2001 (age 23)	libero

Roster of Season 2021/2022
No.	Name	Date of birth	Position
1	(Poland) Jakub Sadkowski	25 February 2002 (age 23)	middle blocker
2	(Poland) Michał Ostrowski	29 March 1990 (age 34)	middle blocker
3	(Poland) Michał Kędzierski	9 August 1994 (age 30)	setter
5	(Russia) Alexander Voropaev	19 October 1993 (age 31)	setter
7	(Poland) Bartłomiej Lemański	19 March 1996 (age 29)	middle blocker
8	(Poland) Paweł Rusin	5 March 1992 (age 33)	outside hitter
9	(Poland) Daniel Gąsior	9 January 1995 (age 30)	opposite
11	(Poland) Sebastian Warda	18 January 1989 (age 36)	middle blocker
12	(Austria) Alexander Berger	27 September 1988 (age 36)	outside hitter
13	(Poland) Mateusz Masłowski	13 June 1997 (age 27)	libero
16	(Poland) Rafał Faryna	28 September 1994 (age 30)	opposite
17	(Poland) Bartosz Firszt	19 March 1999 (age 26)	outside hitter
18	(Poland) Maciej Nowowsiak	20 September 2001 (age 23)	libero
19	(Brazil) José Ademar Santana	6 February 1996 (age 29)	outside hitter
23	(Netherlands) Michaël Parkinson	23 November 1991 (age 33)	middle blocker
33	(Poland) Wiktor Nowak	21 May 1999 (age 25)	setter

== See also ==
- Czarni Radom players
- Czarni Radom coaches

== Squads ==
=== 2019/2020 ===
The following is the Cerrad Enea Czarni Radom roster in the 2019–20 PlusLiga.

Head coach:	(Poland) Robert Prygiel
Assistant:	(Russia) Dmitry Skoryy

No.	Name	Date of birth	Height	Weight	Spike	Position
1	(Slovenia) Alen Pajenk	23 April 1986	2.03 m (6 ft 8 in)	94 kg (207 lb)	352 cm (139 in)	middle blocker
2	(Poland) Michał Ostrowski	29 March 1990	2.03 m (6 ft 8 in)	99 kg (218 lb)	340 cm (130 in)	middle blocker
3	(Poland) Michał Kędzierski	9 August 1994	1.94 m (6 ft 4 in)	83 kg (183 lb)	345 cm (136 in)	setter
4	(Poland) Bartłomiej Grzechnik	8 February 1993	2.00 m (6 ft 7 in)	90 kg (200 lb)	344 cm (135 in)	middle blocker
6	(Poland) Damian Boruch	14 December 1989	2.09 m (6 ft 10 in)	99 kg (218 lb)	349 cm (137 in)	middle blocker
7	(Greece) Athanasios Protopsaltis	12 September 1993	1.85 m (6 ft 1 in)	79 kg (174 lb)	340 cm (130 in)	outside hitter
9	(Slovenia) Dejan Vinčić (C)	15 September 1986	2.02 m (6 ft 8 in)	95 kg (209 lb)	343 cm (135 in)	setter
10	(Poland) Michał Filip^{1}	31 August 1994	1.97 m (6 ft 6 in)	100 kg (220 lb)	345 cm (136 in)	opposite
11	(Poland) Michał Ruciak	22 August 1983	1.90 m (6 ft 3 in)	82 kg (181 lb)	336 cm (132 in)	libero
13	(Poland) Mateusz Masłowski	13 June 1997	1.85 m (6 ft 1 in)	78 kg (172 lb)	330 cm (130 in)	libero
15	(United States) Brenden Sander	22 December 1995	1.95 m (6 ft 5 in)	0 kg (0 lb)	360 cm (140 in)	outside hitter
17	(Poland) Bartosz Firszt	19 March 1999	0 m (0 in)	0 kg (0 lb)	0 cm (0 in)	outside hitter
20	(Poland) Wojciech Włodarczyk	28 October 1990	2.00 m (6 ft 7 in)	88 kg (194 lb)	348 cm (137 in)	outside hitter
21	(Poland) Karol Butryn	18 June 1993	1.94 m (6 ft 4 in)	99 kg (218 lb)	345 cm (136 in)	opposite
27	(Poland) Łukasz Zugaj^{1}	27 January 1993	1.92 m (6 ft 4 in)	99 kg (218 lb)	345 cm (136 in)	opposite

^{1} Michał Filip left the team on 30 January 2020 and joined BKS Visła Bydgoszcz. He was replaced by Łukasz Zugaj.

=== 2018/2019 ===
The following is the Cerrad Czarni Radom roster in the 2018–19 PlusLiga.

Head coach:	(Poland) Robert Prygiel
Assistant:	(Poland) Wojciech Stępień

No.	Name	Date of birth	Height	Weight	Spike	Position
1	(Slovenia) Alen Pajenk	23 April 1986	2.03 m (6 ft 8 in)	94 kg (207 lb)	352 cm (139 in)	middle blocker
2	(Poland) Michał Ostrowski	29 March 1990	2.03 m (6 ft 8 in)	99 kg (218 lb)	340 cm (130 in)	middle blocker
3	(Switzerland) Reto Giger	5 August 1991	1.95 m (6 ft 5 in)	86 kg (190 lb)	345 cm (136 in)	setter
6	(Poland) Wojciech Żaliński	8 January 1988	1.96 m (6 ft 5 in)	92 kg (203 lb)	345 cm (136 in)	outside hitter
8	(Poland) Kacper Wasilewski	4 January 1998	1.91 m (6 ft 3 in)	80 kg (180 lb)	315 cm (124 in)	libero
9	(Slovenia) Dejan Vinčić (C)	15 September 1986	2.02 m (6 ft 8 in)	95 kg (209 lb)	343 cm (135 in)	setter
10	(Poland) Michał Filip	31 August 1994	1.97 m (6 ft 6 in)	100 kg (220 lb)	345 cm (136 in)	opposite
11	(Poland) Michał Ruciak	22 August 1983	1.90 m (6 ft 3 in)	82 kg (181 lb)	336 cm (132 in)	libero
14	(Poland) Jakub Rybicki	1 November 1998	1.96 m (6 ft 5 in)	84 kg (185 lb)	350 cm (140 in)	outside hitter
15	(Poland) Norbert Huber	14 August 1998	2.07 m (6 ft 9 in)	91 kg (201 lb)	352 cm (139 in)	middle blocker
17	(Russia) Maksim Zhigalov	26 July 1989	2.01 m (6 ft 7 in)	85 kg (187 lb)	350 cm (140 in)	opposite
19	(Poland) Tomasz Fornal	31 August 1997	2.00 m (6 ft 7 in)	92 kg (203 lb)	348 cm (137 in)	outside hitter
20	(Poland) Kamil Kwasowski	13 September 1990	1.97 m (6 ft 6 in)	87 kg (192 lb)	340 cm (130 in)	outside hitter

=== 2017/2018 ===
The following is the Cerrad Czarni Radom roster in the 2017–18 PlusLiga.

Head coach:	(Poland) Robert Prygiel
Assistant:	(Poland) Wojciech Stępień

No.	Name	Date of birth	Height	Weight	Spike	Position
1	(Ukraine) Dmytro Teryomenko	1 February 1987	2.00 m (6 ft 7 in)	96 kg (212 lb)	345 cm (136 in)	middle blocker
2	(Poland) Michał Ostrowski	29 March 1990	2.03 m (6 ft 8 in)	99 kg (218 lb)	340 cm (130 in)	middle blocker
5	(Slovenia) Dejan Vinčić	15 September 1986	2.02 m (6 ft 8 in)	95 kg (209 lb)	343 cm (135 in)	setter
6	(Poland) Wojciech Żaliński (C)	8 January 1988	1.96 m (6 ft 5 in)	92 kg (203 lb)	345 cm (136 in)	outside hitter
7	(United States) Dustin Watten	27 October 1986	1.83 m (6 ft 0 in)	80 kg (180 lb)	306 cm (120 in)	libero
8	(Poland) Kacper Wasilewski	4 January 1998	1.91 m (6 ft 3 in)	80 kg (180 lb)	315 cm (124 in)	libero
9	(Poland) Jakub Ziobrowski	23 January 1997	2.02 m (6 ft 8 in)	104 kg (229 lb)	360 cm (140 in)	opposite
10	(Poland) Michał Filip	31 August 1994	1.97 m (6 ft 6 in)	100 kg (220 lb)	345 cm (136 in)	opposite
11	(Poland) Kamil Droszyński	28 January 1997	1.90 m (6 ft 3 in)	86 kg (190 lb)	337 cm (133 in)	setter
13	(Poland) Łukasz Zugaj	27 January 1993	1.92 m (6 ft 4 in)	99 kg (218 lb)	345 cm (136 in)	opposite
14	(Poland) Jakub Rybicki	1 November 1998	1.96 m (6 ft 5 in)	84 kg (185 lb)	350 cm (140 in)	outside hitter
15	(Poland) Norbert Huber	14 August 1998	2.07 m (6 ft 9 in)	91 kg (201 lb)	352 cm (139 in)	middle blocker
19	(Poland) Tomasz Fornal	31 August 1997	2.00 m (6 ft 7 in)	92 kg (203 lb)	348 cm (137 in)	outside hitter
20	(Poland) Kamil Kwasowski	13 September 1990	1.97 m (6 ft 6 in)	87 kg (192 lb)	340 cm (130 in)	outside hitter

=== 2016/2017 ===
The following is the Cerrad Czarni Radom roster in the 2016–17 PlusLiga.

Head coach:	(Poland) Robert Prygiel
Assistant:	(Poland) Wojciech Stępień

No.	Name	Date of birth	Height	Weight	Spike	Position
1	(Poland) Bartłomiej Bołądź	28 September 1994	2.04 m (6 ft 8 in)	102 kg (225 lb)	350 cm (140 in)	opposite
2	(Poland) Michał Ostrowski	29 March 1990	2.03 m (6 ft 8 in)	99 kg (218 lb)	340 cm (130 in)	middle blocker
3	(Poland) Łukasz Wiese	24 March 1993	1.95 m (6 ft 5 in)	81 kg (179 lb)	347 cm (137 in)	outside hitter
5	(Poland) Jakub Urbanowicz	14 August 1993	2.03 m (6 ft 8 in)	86 kg (190 lb)	360 cm (140 in)	outside hitter
6	(Poland) Wojciech Żaliński (C)	8 January 1988	1.96 m (6 ft 5 in)	92 kg (203 lb)	345 cm (136 in)	outside hitter
7	(Poland) Michał Kędzierski	9 August 1994	1.94 m (6 ft 4 in)	83 kg (183 lb)	345 cm (136 in)	setter
8	(Poland) Jakub Zwiech	6 November 1996	2.04 m (6 ft 8 in)	92 kg (203 lb)	351 cm (138 in)	middle blocker
9	(Poland) Jakub Ziobrowski	23 January 1997	2.02 m (6 ft 8 in)	104 kg (229 lb)	360 cm (140 in)	opposite
10	(United States) Dustin Watten	27 October 1986	1.83 m (6 ft 0 in)	80 kg (180 lb)	306 cm (120 in)	libero
11	(Poland) Piotr Filipowicz	29 August 1995	1.90 m (6 ft 3 in)	88 kg (194 lb)	316 cm (124 in)	libero
12	(Slovakia) Emanuel Kohút	21 July 1982	2.04 m (6 ft 8 in)	101 kg (223 lb)	350 cm (140 in)	middle blocker
15	(United States) David Smith	15 May 1985	2.01 m (6 ft 7 in)	91 kg (201 lb)	348 cm (137 in)	middle blocker
17	(Poland) Tomasz Fornal	31 August 1997	2.00 m (6 ft 7 in)	92 kg (203 lb)	348 cm (137 in)	outside hitter
18	(Poland) Kacper Gonciarz	31 August 1992	1.92 m (6 ft 4 in)	88 kg (194 lb)	320 cm (130 in)	setter

=== 2015/2016 ===
The following is the Cerrad Czarni Radom roster in the 2015–16 PlusLiga.

Head coach:	(Argentina) Raul Lozano
Assistant:	(Poland) Robert Prygiel

No.	Name	Date of birth	Height	Weight	Spike	Position
1	(Poland) Bartłomiej Bołądź	28 September 1994	2.04 m (6 ft 8 in)	102 kg (225 lb)	350 cm (140 in)	opposite
2	(Poland) Michał Ostrowski	29 March 1990	2.03 m (6 ft 8 in)	99 kg (218 lb)	340 cm (130 in)	opposite
3	(Belgium) Igor Grobelny	8 June 1993	1.94 m (6 ft 4 in)	77 kg (170 lb)	360 cm (140 in)	outside hitter
4	(Poland) Daniel Pliński (C)	10 December 1978	2.04 m (6 ft 8 in)	100 kg (220 lb)	330 cm (130 in)	middle blocker
5	(Poland) Bartłomiej Grzechnik	8 February 1993	2.00 m (6 ft 7 in)	90 kg (200 lb)	344 cm (135 in)	middle blocker
6	(Poland) Wojciech Żaliński	8 January 1988	1.96 m (6 ft 5 in)	92 kg (203 lb)	345 cm (136 in)	outside hitter
8	(Poland) Jakub Zwiech	6 November 1996	2.04 m (6 ft 8 in)	92 kg (203 lb)	351 cm (138 in)	middle blocker
9	(Poland) Adam Kowalski	16 September 1994	1.80 m (5 ft 11 in)	75 kg (165 lb)	325 cm (128 in)	libero
10	(Germany) Lukas Kampa	29 November 1986	1.93 m (6 ft 4 in)	90 kg (200 lb)	340 cm (130 in)	setter
11	(Poland) Patryk Szczurek	6 February 1991	0 m (0 in)	0 kg (0 lb)	0 cm (0 in)	setter
12	(Poland) Artur Szalpuk	20 March 1995	2.01 m (6 ft 7 in)	93 kg (205 lb)	350 cm (140 in)	outside hitter
13	(Poland) Łukasz Zugaj	27 January 1993	1.92 m (6 ft 4 in)	99 kg (218 lb)	345 cm (136 in)	setter
15	(United States) Zack La Cavera	14 October 1992	1.96 m (6 ft 5 in)	88 kg (194 lb)	355 cm (140 in)	opposite
16	(Poland) Radosław Zbierski	14 April 1988	0 m (0 in)	0 kg (0 lb)	0 cm (0 in)	libero
17	(Serbia) Neven Majstorović	17 March 1989	1.93 m (6 ft 4 in)	93 kg (205 lb)	325 cm (128 in)	outside hitter

=== 2014/2015 ===
The following is the Cerrad Czarni Radom roster in the 2014–15 PlusLiga.

Head coach:	(Poland) Robert Prygiel
Assistant:	(Poland) Wojciech Stępień

No.	Name	Date of birth	Height	Weight	Spike	Position
1	(Poland) Bartłomiej Bołądź	28 September 1994	2.04 m (6 ft 8 in)	102 kg (225 lb)	350 cm (140 in)	opposite
2	(Poland) Michał Ostrowski	29 March 1990	2.03 m (6 ft 8 in)	99 kg (218 lb)	340 cm (130 in)	middle blocker
3	(Belgium) Igor Grobelny	8 June 1993	1.94 m (6 ft 4 in)	77 kg (170 lb)	360 cm (140 in)	outside hitter
4	(Poland) Daniel Pliński (C)	10 December 1978	2.04 m (6 ft 8 in)	100 kg (220 lb)	330 cm (130 in)	middle blocker
5	(Poland) Bartłomiej Grzechnik	8 February 1993	2.00 m (6 ft 7 in)	90 kg (200 lb)	344 cm (135 in)	middle blocker
6	(Poland) Wojciech Żaliński	8 January 1988	1.96 m (6 ft 5 in)	92 kg (203 lb)	345 cm (136 in)	outside hitter
7	(Poland) Jakub Wachnik	16 February 1993	2.02 m (6 ft 8 in)	100 kg (220 lb)	350 cm (140 in)	outside hitter
8	(Germany) Dirk Westphal	31 January 1986	2.03 m (6 ft 8 in)	100 kg (220 lb)	355 cm (140 in)	outside hitter
9	(Poland) Adam Kowalski	16 September 1994	1.80 m (5 ft 11 in)	75 kg (165 lb)	325 cm (128 in)	libero
10	(Germany) Lukas Kampa	29 November 1986	1.93 m (6 ft 4 in)	90 kg (200 lb)	340 cm (130 in)	setter
12	(United States) Jacek Ratajczak	24 November 1986	2.14 m (7 ft 0 in)	100 kg (220 lb)	360 cm (140 in)	middle blocker
13	(Poland) Michał Kędzierski	9 August 1994	1.94 m (6 ft 4 in)	83 kg (183 lb)	345 cm (136 in)	setter
14	(Poland) Kamil Gutkowski	15 October 1986	1.94 m (6 ft 4 in)	92 kg (203 lb)	335 cm (132 in)	libero / outside hitter
15	(Finland) Mikko Oivanen	26 May 1986	1.98 m (6 ft 6 in)	92 kg (203 lb)	360 cm (140 in)	opposite

=== 2013/2014 ===
The following is the Cerrad Czarni Radom roster in the 2013–14 PlusLiga.

Head coach:	(Poland) Robert Prygiel
Assistant:	(Poland) Wojciech Stępień

No.	Name	Date of birth	Height	Weight	Spike	Position
1	(Poland) Bartłomiej Bołądź	28 September 1994	2.04 m (6 ft 8 in)	102 kg (225 lb)	350 cm (140 in)	opposite
2	(Poland) Michał Ostrowski	29 March 1990	2.03 m (6 ft 8 in)	99 kg (218 lb)	340 cm (130 in)	middle blocker
3	(Poland) Rafał Faryna	28 September 1994	2.00 m (6 ft 7 in)	96 kg (212 lb)	351 cm (138 in)	opposite
4	(Poland) Jakub Radomski	16 March 1988	2.03 m (6 ft 8 in)	95 kg (209 lb)	350 cm (140 in)	outside hitter
5	(Poland) Bartłomiej Grzechnik	8 February 1993	2.00 m (6 ft 7 in)	90 kg (200 lb)	344 cm (135 in)	middle blocker
6	(Poland) Bartłomiej Neroj (C)	22 November 1984	2.00 m (6 ft 7 in)	98 kg (216 lb)	338 cm (133 in)	setter
7	(Poland) Jakub Wachnik	16 February 1993	2.02 m (6 ft 8 in)	100 kg (220 lb)	350 cm (140 in)	outside hitter
8	(Germany) Dirk Westphal	31 January 1986	2.03 m (6 ft 8 in)	100 kg (220 lb)	355 cm (140 in)	outside hitter
9	(Poland) Adam Kowalski	16 September 1994	1.80 m (5 ft 11 in)	75 kg (165 lb)	325 cm (128 in)	libero
10	(Netherlands) Wytze Kooistra	3 June 1982	2.09 m (6 ft 10 in)	102 kg (225 lb)	360 cm (140 in)	opposite
11	(Poland) Łukasz Zugaj	27 January 1993	1.92 m (6 ft 4 in)	99 kg (218 lb)	345 cm (136 in)	setter
12	(Poland) Adam Kamiński	27 May 1984	2.04 m (6 ft 8 in)	90 kg (200 lb)	355 cm (140 in)	middle blocker
13	(Poland) Michał Kędzierski	9 August 1994	1.94 m (6 ft 4 in)	83 kg (183 lb)	345 cm (136 in)	setter
14	(Poland) Kamil Gutkowski	15 October 1986	1.94 m (6 ft 4 in)	92 kg (203 lb)	335 cm (132 in)	outside hitter
15	(Poland) Paweł Filipowicz	7 May 1992	1.89 m (6 ft 2 in)	76 kg (168 lb)	318 cm (125 in)	libero
16	(Slovakia) Jozef Piovarči	9 November 1984	2.08 m (6 ft 10 in)	114 kg (251 lb)	350 cm (140 in)	middle blocker
