= Ryszard Kotala =

Polish volleyball player

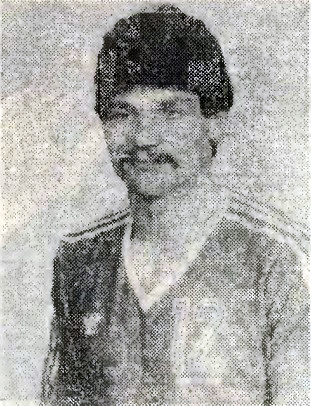
- Ryszard Kotala in 1990

Personal information
- Full name: Ryszard Kotala

Career
Teams
	Orlęta Radom; Czarni Radom

Ryszard Kotala - Polish volleyball player. He was a member of Czarni Radom team which was promoted to the second level league in 1979 and in 1983-84 season to Ekstraklasa. In 1988 with the team, Kotala came 4th in the league, which was the highest place in his career.
