= Bartłomiej Grzechnik =

Polish volleyball player (born 1993)

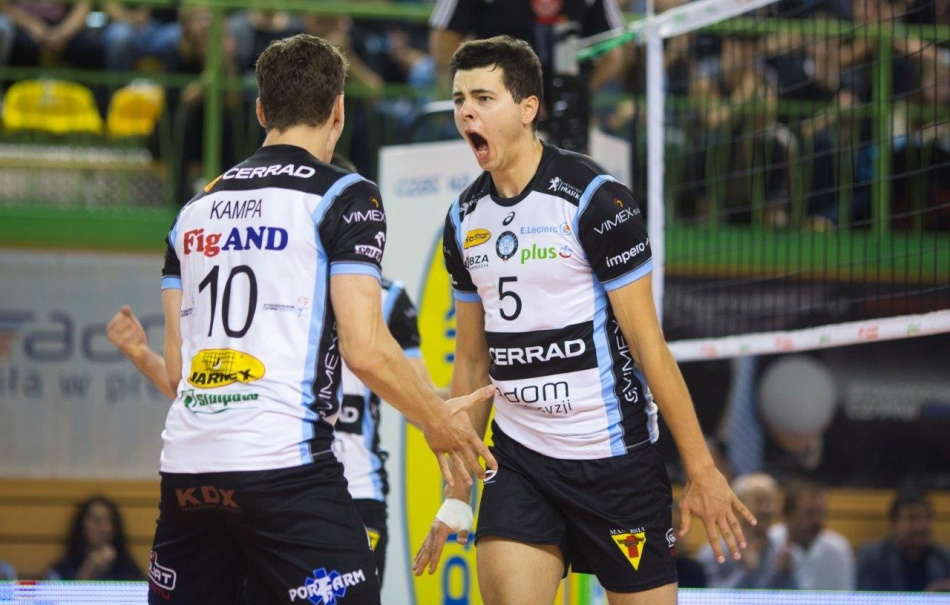

Personal information
- Nationality: (Poland) Polish
- Born: 8 February 1993 (age 33); Radom, Poland
- Height: 2.00 m (6 ft 7 in)
- Weight: 90 kg (198 lb)
- Spike: 344 cm (135 in)

Volleyball information
- Position: Middle blocker
- Current club: (Poland) Cerrad Enea Czarni Radom
- Number: 5

Career
Years	Teams
2012–2016; 2016–2017; 2017–2019; 2019–	(Poland) Czarni Radom (Poland) BBTS Bielsko-Biała (Poland) MKS Będzin (Poland) Czarni Radom
Honours
Men's volleyball
Representing Poland
European League
Bronze medal – third place	2015 Poland

Bartłomiej Grzechnik (born 8 February 1993) is a Polish volleyball player, a member of the Polish club Czarni Radom.

== Career ==
=== National team ===
On April 2, 2015 was appointed to the Polish national team by head coach Stephane Antiga. After the training camp in Spała he went to team B of Polish national team led by Andrzej Kowal. He took part in 1st edition of 2015 European Games. On August 14, 2015 he achieved first medal as national team player – bronze of European League. His national team won 3rd place match with Estonia (3–0).
