= Piotr Łukasik =

Polish volleyball player (born 1994)

- Łukasik in 2019

Personal information
- Nickname: Kiki
- Nationality: Polish
- Born: 11 July 1994 (age 32); Ostróda, Poland
- Height: 2.08 m (6 ft 10 in)
- Weight: 112 kg (247 lb)
- Spike: 350 cm (138 in)
- Block: 325 cm (128 in)

Volleyball information
- Position: Outside hitter
- Current club: Czarni Radom
- Number: 7

Career
Years	Teams
2011–2014; 2014–2017; 2017–2018; 2018–2019; 2019–2021; 2021–2022; 2022–	AZS Olsztyn; KPS Siedlce; BBTS Bielsko-Biała; Onico Warsaw; ZAKSA Kędzierzyn-Koźle; Ślepsk Suwałki; Czarni Radom

National team
Poland
Honours
Men's volleyball
Representing Poland
FIVB Nations League
Bronze medal – third place	2019 Chicago

Piotr Łukasik (born 11 July 1994) is a Polish professional volleyball player. He is the 2020–21 CEV Champions League winner and a bronze medallist at the 2019 Nations League. At the professional club level, he plays for Cerrad Enea Czarni Radom.

== Honours ==
=== Club ===
- CEV Champions League
  - 2020–21 – with ZAKSA Kędzierzyn-Koźle
- National championships
  - 2019–20 Polish SuperCup, with ZAKSA Kędzierzyn-Koźle
  - 2020–21 Polish SuperCup, with ZAKSA Kędzierzyn-Koźle
  - 2020–21 Polish Cup, with ZAKSA Kędzierzyn-Koźle
