= Wojciech Jurkiewicz =

Polish volleyball player (born 1977)

Personal information
- Full name: Wojciech Jurkiewicz
- Nationality: Polish
- Born: June 21, 1977 (age 49) Lubin, Poland
- Height: 2.05 m (6 ft 9 in)
- Weight: 97 kg (214 lb)
- Spike: 350 cm (140 in)
- Block: 330 cm (130 in)

Volleyball information
- Position: Middle blocker
- Current team: Łuczniczka Bydgoszcz
- Number: 4

Career
- Years: Team
- 1998–2000 2000–2003 2003–2006 2006–2007 2007–2009 2009–2018: Ikar Legnica; Morze Bałtyk Szczecin; AZS Częstochowa; AZS Politechnika Warszawska; Jastrzębski Węgiel; Łuczniczka Bydgoszcz

National team
- Years: Team
- 2005–2007: Poland (8)

Wojciech Jurkiewicz (born 21 June 1977) is a former Polish volleyball player, a member of Poland men's national volleyball team in 2005-2007.

== Personal life ==
Jurkiewicz was born in Lubin, Poland. He is a graduate of University of Wrocław (Germanic Philology). He has a younger brother Mariusz, who is a handball player - member of Polish national team and bronze medalist of World Championship 2015. He is married to Agnieszka. They have a daughter Aleksandra and a son named Igor.

== Career ==
In 2009 he went to DTransfer Bydgoszcz. In 2014 he extended his contract with the club.

== Sporting achievements ==
=== CEV Challenge Cup ===
- 2008/2009 - with Jastrzębski Węgiel

=== National championship ===
- 2003/2004 Polish Championship, with Wkręt-met Domex AZS Częstochowa
- 2004/2005 Polish Championship, with Wkręt-met Domex AZS Częstochowa
- 2008/2009 Polish Championship, with Jastrzębski Węgiel
