= Jakub Bednaruk =

Polish volleyball player and coach

Personal information
- Born: 9 September 1976 (age 50); Bielsko-Biała, Poland
- Height: 1.88 m (6 ft 2 in)

Coaching information
Previous teams coached
Years	Teams
2010–2012; 2012–2017; 2017–2019; 2019–2021; 2021–2022	AZS Politechnika Warszawska (AC); AZS Politechnika Warszawska; Łuczniczka Bydgoszcz; MKS Będzin; Czarni Radom

Volleyball information
- Position: Setter

Career
Years	Teams
1993–1996; 1996–1997; 1997–1998; 1998–1999; 1999–2001; 2001–2003; 2003–2004; 2004; 2004–2007; 2007–2008; 2008–2009; 2009; 2009–2010	BBTS Bielsko-Biała; Czarni Radom; Górnik Radlin; Legia Warsaw; Czarni Radom; Skra Bełchatów; BBTS Bielsko-Biała; AZS Politechnika Warszawska; Jastrzębski Węgiel; Trentino Volley; Trefl Gdańsk; Czarni Radom; AZS Politechnika Warszawska

Jakub Bednaruk (born 9 September 1976) is a Polish former professional volleyball player and coach. He works as a volleyball commentator for Polsat Sport.

== Career as coach ==
In 2010, Bednaruk started his coaching career at AZS Politechnika Warszawska as an assistant coach. In 2012, he was appointed head coach of this club. In April 2017, he moved to Łuczniczka Bydgoszcz.

In 2019, he was announced a new head coach of MKS Będzin.

== Honours ==
=== As a player ===
- Domestic
  - 1998–99 Polish Cup, with Czarni Radom
  - 2007–08 Italian Championship, with Itas Diatec Trentino
