= Radosław Panas =

Polish volleyball player (born 1970)

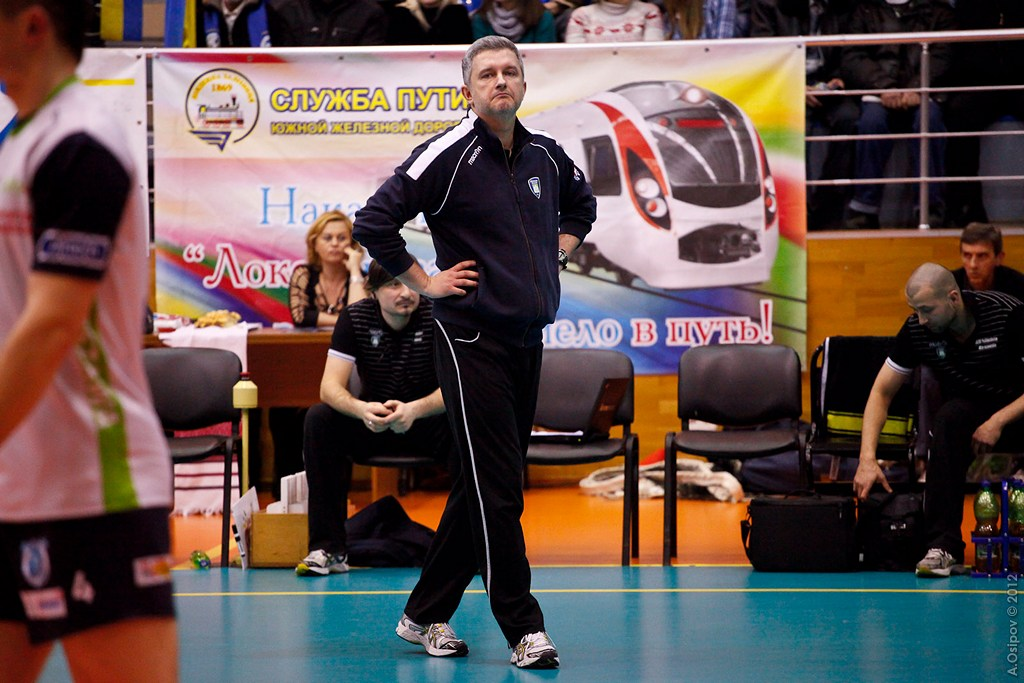
Rodosław Panas

Radosław Panas [raˈdɔswaf ˈpanas] (born May 11, 1970 in Opole, Poland), Polish volleyball player (195 cm), one of the most experienced players in Polish Volleyball League. He played the position of the receiver, in a career last season (2004/05) as a libero.

He started his volleyball career in MKS Zryw Opole, and his first coach was Jerzy Tracz. He played in the finals of Polish Junior Championship and also in the Championship MKS-country team, having won the gold medal with his team.

After graduation in 1989, he moved to AZS Częstochowa, where he was recruited by coaches Stanisław Gościniak and Ryszard Bosek. Panas was quoted as saying "They saw me when I was a member of the junior Polish national team, I went to consult with senior staff coach Leszek Milewski". In Częstochowa, he played virtually all the time, with a 2-seasonal break when he played in Mostostal-Azoty Kedzierzyn-Kozle (1995/96-1996/97). In the final season of his volleyball career (2004/05) he played in the KP Polska Energia Sosnowiec.

He won five Polish championships (all with AZS Częstochowa), six times he was runner-up in the country (five with AZS, once with Mostostal-Azoty), twice bronze medal winner (both from AZS). He played in the Polish national senior team 58 times, which included a place in the Polish squad for the European Championships of 1995.

He graduated from the Pedagogical University in Częstochowa (1995, direction of physical education). He owed much to coaches Jerzy Tracz and Stanisław Gościniak.

In the 2005-06 season, Panas became the second coach of the KP Polska Energia Sosnowiec. In January 2006, he was replaced by Marian Kardas as first club coach at Sosnowiec. The team was relegated to the first league. From June 2006, he was the coach of the Wkręt-Met Domex AZS Częstochowa. After the 2008/09 season, AZS stewards no longer required his services. In the 2009/10 season he became head coach of AZS Politechnika Warszawa.

Panas is married to Mariola. They have a daughter Anna.
