= Wojciech Stępień =

Polish volleyball player

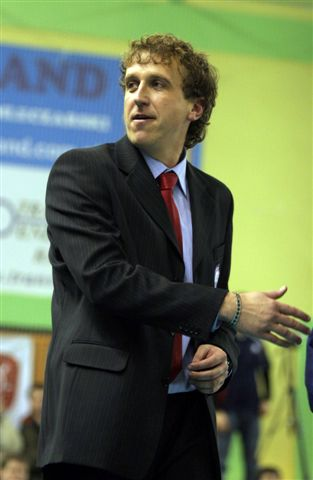

Personal information
- Full name: Wojciech Stępień
- Nationality: Polish
- Born: July 6, 1970 (age 56) Opole Lubelskie, Poland

Volleyball information

National team
- Years: Team
- 1994–1994: Poland

Wojciech Stępień (born 6 July 1970) is a former Polish volleyball player, a member of Polish national team in 1994, coach.
