= Thomas Jarmoc =

Canadian volleyball player (born 1987)

Personal information
- Full name: Thomas Jarmoc
- Nationality: Canadian; Polish
- Born: April 19, 1987 (age 39) Calgary, Alberta, Canada
- Height: 1.98 m (6 ft 6 in)
- Weight: 89 kg (196 lb)
- Spike: 348 cm (137 in)
- Block: 329 cm (130 in)

Volleyball information
- Position: Outside hitter
- Number: 11

Career
- Years: Team
- 2010–2011 2011–2012 2012–2013 2013–2014: AEK Athens; VfB Friedrichshafen; VC Euphony Asse-Lennik; Jastrzębski Węgiel
- Updated on 20 February 2017

Thomas Jarmoc (born April 19, 1987) is a Canadian volleyball player of Polish origins.

== Personal life ==
Jarmoc was born in Calgary, Alberta. His parents are Poles. They emigrated from Poland before the birth of their children. He speaks Polish well and was his first language. Jarmoc's father is a former basketball player, mother is a former representative of Poland in high jump. Jarmoc has two younger sisters - Caroline and Patrycja, who are also a volleyball player.

== Career ==
=== Clubs ===
He started playing volleyball in the team of the University of Alberta. As a professional player debuted in Greek club AEK Athens. In 2011 moved to VfB Friedrichshafen. He won with club from Friedrichshafen German Cup 2012. Season 2012/2013 spent in VC Euphony Asse-Lennik and moved to Polish club Jastrzębski Węgiel in 2013. With this club Jarmoc won bronze medal of Polish Championship 2012/2013 and bronze medal of CEV Champions League 2014 after winning match against VC Zenit-Kazan. In 2014 left club from Jastrzębie-Zdrój.

== Sporting achievements ==
=== Clubs ===
==== CEV Champions League ====
- 2013/2014 - with Jastrzębski Węgiel

==== National championships ====
- 2011/2012 German Cup, with VfB Friedrichshafen
- 2013/2014 Polish Championship, with Jastrzębski Węgiel
