= Robert Prygiel =

Polish volleyball player and coach

Personal information
- Nationality: (Poland) Polish
- Born: 17 April 1976 (age 50); Radom, Poland
- Height: 2.00 m (6 ft 7 in)

Coaching information
Previous teams coached
| Years | Teams |
|---|---|
| 2013–2015; 2015–2016; 2016–2021 | Czarni Radom; Czarni Radom (AC); Czarni Radom |

Volleyball information
- Position: Opposite

Career
| Years | Teams |
|---|---|
| 1993–1995; 1995–1997; 1997–2000; 2000–2001; 2001–2003; 2003–2007; 2007–2009; 2009–2010; 2010–2011; 2011–2013 | (Poland) Czarni Radom (Poland) AZS Częstochowa (Poland) Legia Warsaw (Poland) Czarni Radom (Poland) Skra Bełchatów (Russia) Gazprom-Ugra Surgut (Poland) Jastrzębski Węgiel (Poland) Jadar Radom (Poland) AZS Politechnika Warszawska (Poland) Czarni Radom |

National team
| 1996–2007 | Poland (136) |

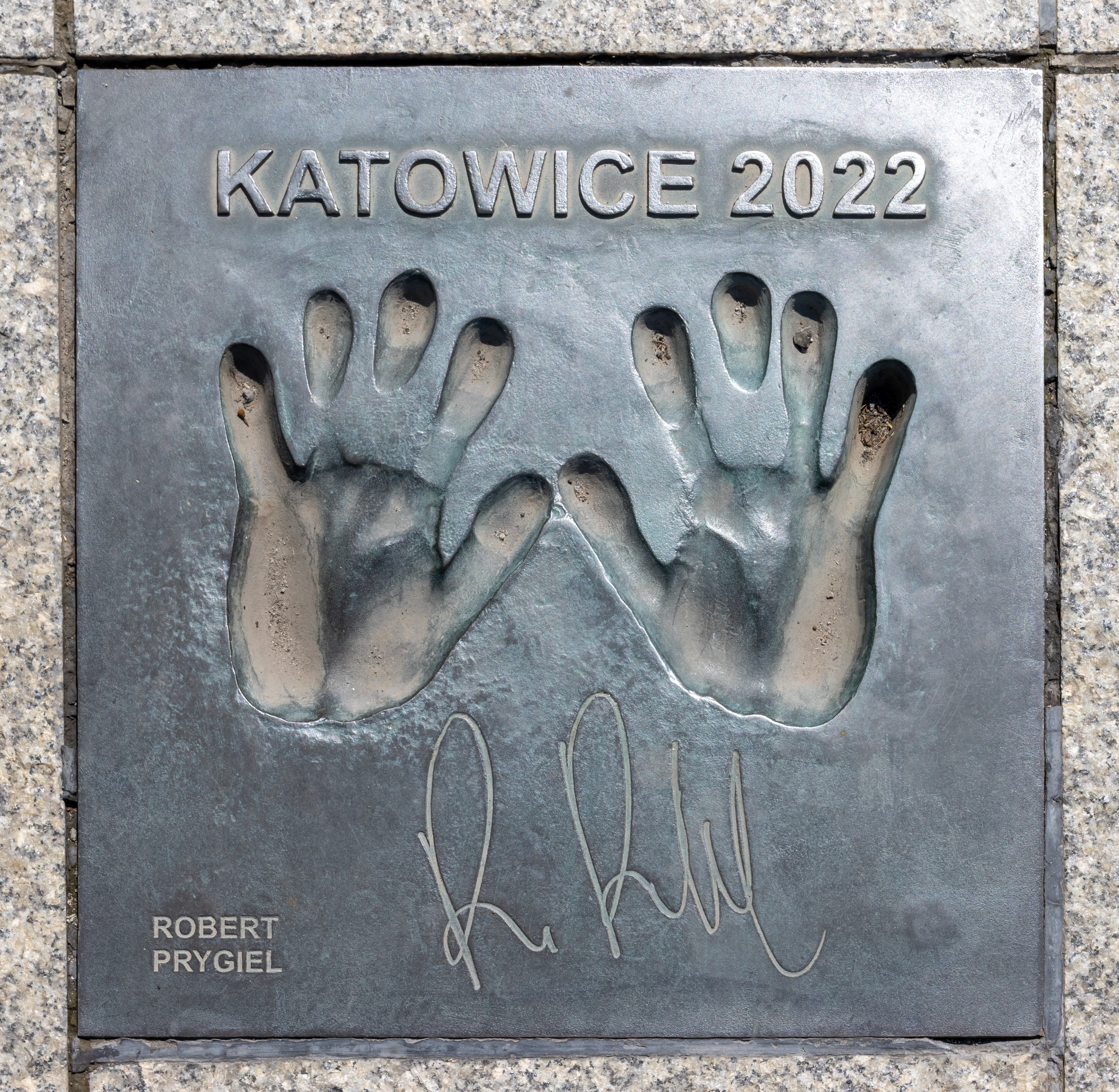
Hand prints and signature at the Avenue of Volleyball Stars, Katowice

Robert Prygiel (born 14 April 1976) is a Polish volleyball coach and former volleyball player, member of the Poland men's national volleyball team in 1996–2007, participant of the Olympic Games Atlanta 1996, Polish Champion (1997).

== Personal life ==
He was born in Radom, Poland. He graduated from the School of Property Management in Warsaw. He is married to Katarzyna. They have three daughters – Zuzanna (born 2002), Nina (born 2005) and Kalina (born 2010).

== Career as coach ==
He debuted as a coach in 2013. He was a head coach of Cerrad Czarni Radom, where he ended his career as a player. In 2015 he was replaced by Raúl Lozano.

== Sporting achievements ==
=== As a player ===
- CEV Challenge Cup
  - 2008/2009 – with Jastrzębski Węgiel
- National championships
  - 1996/1997 Polish Championship, with AZS Częstochowa
