= BKS Visła Bydgoszcz =

Polish volleyball club

- Full name: Bydgoski Klub Sportowy Visła Bydgoszcz
- Short name: Visła Bydgoszcz
- Founded: 1956; 69 years ago
- Ground: Łuczniczka ul. Toruńska 59; 85–023 Bydgoszcz (Capacity: 6,082)
- Chairman: Wojciech Jurkiewicz
- Manager: Marcin Ogonowski
- Captain: Michal Masný
- League: Tauron 1. Liga
- Website: Club home page

Uniforms
| Home | Away |

BKS Visła Bydgoszcz, historically named Chemik Bydgoszcz, is a Polish professional men's volleyball team based in Bydgoszcz, founded in 1956. The club played in the top Polish volleyball league – PlusLiga from 2006 to 2020.

== Team history ==
In 1947 the country decided to rebuild its infrastructure and re-opened the local chemical plant which manufactured explosive materials in 1947. In 1949 its employees registered a sports club under the name Koło Sportowe Wisła Łęgnowo or KS Wisła for short. The club was re-registered as Unia Łęgnowo in 1951.

The volleyball section was created in 1956, but was dissolved in 1961. In 1975, new senior and junior teams were created.

In 2006 after matches with Joker Piła, club called BKS Delecta–Chemik Bydgoszcz was promoted to PlusLiga. In 2013 the club was promoted to the CEV Cup tournament, but resigned. After a bad half of the season 2016/17 Piotr Makowski was dismissed in February 2017. Marian Kardas was a temporary head coach. On February 21, 2017, Dragan Mihailović was announced as a head coach and he led the team to the end of season 2016/17. During 2019–2020 season, Visła Bydgoszcz managed to win only 3 matches and obtainined 15 points throughout the whole season. This resulted in relegation to TAURON 1. Liga, second tier league. After relegation, in seasons 2020–2021, 2021–2022 and 2022–2023 of TAURON 1. Liga, Visła Bydgoszcz managed to finish the round on high, third position.

== Former names ==
| Years | Name |
|---|---|
| 1975–2004 | Bydgoski Klub Sportowy (BKS) Chemik Bydgoszcz |
| 2004–2006 | BKS Delecta–Chemik Bydgoszcz |
| 2006–2008 | BKSCh Delecta Bydgoszcz |
| 2008–2013 | Delecta Bydgoszcz |
| 2013–2015 | Transfer Bydgoszcz |
| 2015–2018 | Łuczniczka Bydgoszcz |
| 2018–2019 | Chemik Bydgoszcz |
| 2019–2021 | BKS Visła Bydgoszcz |
| 2021– | BKS Visła Proline Bydgoszcz |

== Coaches ==
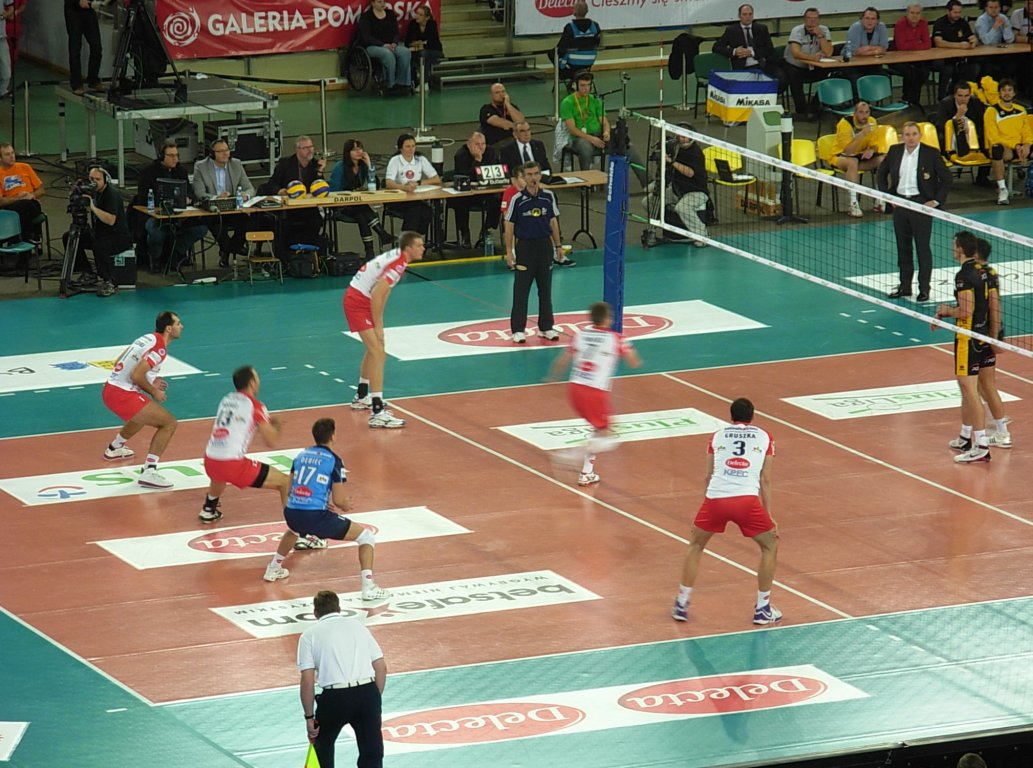
During the league match against PGE Skra Bełchatów, November 28, 2009

| 2005–2006 | (Poland) Paweł Blomberg |
| 2006–2007 | (Poland) Wiesław Popik |
| 2007–2008 | (Slovakia) Rastislav Chudík |
| 2008–2011 | (Poland) Waldemar Wspaniały |
| 2011–2013 | (Poland) Piotr Makowski |
| 2013 | (Poland) Marian Kardas |
| 2013–2015 | (Belgium) Vital Heynen |
| 2015–2017 | (Poland) Piotr Makowski |
| 2017 | (Serbia) Dragan Mihailović |
| 2017–2019 | (Poland) Jakub Bednaruk |
| 2019–2020 | (Poland) Przemysław Michalczyk |
| 2020–2022 | (Poland) Marcin Ogonowski |
| 2022– | (Slovakia) Michal Masný |

== Season by season ==
| Season | Tier | League | Pos. |
|---|---|---|---|
| 2008–2009 | 1 | PlusLiga | 7 |
| 2009–2010 | 1 | PlusLiga | 6 |
| 2010–2011 | 1 | PlusLiga | 6 |
| 2011–2012 | 1 | PlusLiga | 5 |
| 2012–2013 | 1 | PlusLiga | 4 |
| 2013–2014 | 1 | PlusLiga | 9 |
| 2014–2015 | 1 | PlusLiga | 5 |
| 2015–2016 | 1 | PlusLiga | 9 |

| Season | Tier | League | Pos. |
|---|---|---|---|
| 2016–2017 | 1 | PlusLiga | 15 |
| 2017–2018 | 1 | PlusLiga | 14 |
| 2018–2019 | 1 | PlusLiga | 12 |
| 2019–2020 | 1 | PlusLiga | 14 |
| 2020–2021 | 2 | TAURON 1. Liga | 3 |
| 2021–2022 | 2 | TAURON 1. Liga | 3 |
| 2022–2023 | 2 | TAURON 1. Liga | 3 |
| 2023–2024 | 2 | TAURON 1. Liga | |

== Notable players ==
- (Poland) Dawid Murek
- (United States) Garrett Muagututia
- (Poland) Grzegorz Kosok
- (Poland) Jakub Jarosz
- (Canada) Justin Duff
- (Belgium) Kévin Klinkenberg
- (Poland) Michał Ruciak
- (Poland) Paweł Woicki
- (France) Stéphane Antiga
