= 2023–24 PlusLiga =

Polish volleyball league

- League: PlusLiga
- Sport: Volleyball
- Duration: 20 October 2023 – 28 April 2024
- Number of games: 267
- Number of teams: 16
- TV partner(s): Polsat Sport
- League champions: Jastrzębski Węgiel (4th title)

Seasons
- ← 2022–23 2024–25 →

The 2023–24 PlusLiga was the 88th season of the Polish Volleyball Championship, the 71st season of the highest tier domestic division in the Polish volleyball league system since its establishment in 1954, and the 24th season as a professional league. The league is operated by the Polish Volleyball League SA (Polish: Polska Liga Siatkówki SA).

This season was composed of 16 teams, including the Ukrainian team of Barkom-Kazhany Lviv. The regular season was played as a round-robin tournament. Each team played a total of 30 matches, half at home and half away. The season started on 20 October 2023 and concluded on 28 April 2024.

Jastrzębski Węgiel won their 4th title of the Polish Champions, beating Aluron CMC Warta Zawiercie in the finals.

== Regular season ==
Ranking system:

1. Points
2. Number of victories
3. Set ratio
4. Setpoint ratio
5. H2H results

Result	Winners	Losers
3–0	3 points	0 points
3–1	3 points	0 points
3–2	2 points	1 point

Pos	Team	Pld	W	L	Pts	SW	SL	SR	SPW	SPL	SPR	Qualification or relegation
1	Jastrzębski Węgiel	30	25	5	75	80	27	2.963	2586	2218	1.166	Quarterfinals
2	Aluron CMC Warta Zawiercie	30	24	6	70	79	34	2.324	2708	2421	1.119	Quarterfinals
3	Projekt Warsaw	30	23	7	69	76	32	2.375	2564	2311	1.109	Quarterfinals
4	Asseco Resovia	30	22	8	61	74	42	1.762	2736	2544	1.075	Quarterfinals
5	Trefl Gdańsk	30	17	13	54	65	49	1.327	2624	2569	1.021	Quarterfinals
6	Bogdanka LUK Lublin	30	18	12	52	66	53	1.245	2683	2620	1.024	Quarterfinals
7	PSG Stal Nysa	30	15	15	46	61	60	1.017	2668	2691	0.991	Quarterfinals
8	Indykpol AZS Olsztyn	30	13	17	45	59	60	0.983	2671	2678	0.997	Quarterfinals
9	PGE GiEK Skra Bełchatów	30	15	15	42	54	60	0.900	2593	2584	1.003	
10	ZAKSA Kędzierzyn-Koźle	30	13	17	39	51	58	0.879	2454	2499	0.982	
11	Barkom-Kazhany Lviv	30	13	17	38	51	64	0.797	2564	2708	0.947	
12	Ślepsk Malow Suwałki	30	10	20	29	42	70	0.600	2406	2583	0.931	
13	KGHM Cuprum Lubin	30	9	21	29	43	71	0.606	2452	2619	0.936	
14	GKS Katowice	30	9	21	27	42	73	0.575	2495	2669	0.935	
15	Norwid Częstochowa	30	7	23	24	34	77	0.442	2395	2628	0.911	
16	Enea Czarni Radom	30	7	23	20	29	76	0.382	2228	2485	0.897	Relegation

Source: PlusLiga

=== 1st round ===
Date	Time		Score		Set 1	Set 2	Set 3	Set 4	Set 5	Total	Report
20 Oct	17:30	PSG Stal Nysa	0–3	Jastrzębski Węgiel	19–25	28–30	22–25			69–80	
20 Oct	20:30	Bogdanka LUK Lublin	3–0	Enea Czarni Radom	26–24	25–17	25–19			76–60	
21 Oct	14:45	ZAKSA Kędzierzyn-Koźle	3–1	PGE GiEK Skra Bełchatów	25–20	25–19	22–25	25–20		97–84	
21 Oct	17:30	KGHM Cuprum Lubin	3–0	Barkom-Kazhany Lviv	37–35	25–20	25–17			87–72	
21 Oct	20:30	Indykpol AZS Olsztyn	3–1	Aluron CMC Warta Zawiercie	23–25	27–25	26–24	27–25		103–99	
22 Oct	14:45	Asseco Resovia	1–3	Projekt Warsaw	25–21	19–25	19–25	17–25		80–96	
22 Oct	20:30	GKS Katowice	0–3	Trefl Gdańsk	22–25	20–25	18–25			60–75	
23 Oct	17:30	Norwid Częstochowa	1–3	Ślepsk Malow Suwałki	23–25	19–25	25–20	16–25		83–95	

=== 2nd round ===
Date	Time		Score		Set 1	Set 2	Set 3	Set 4	Set 5	Total	Report
24 Oct	16:00	PGE GiEK Skra Bełchatów	3–2	KGHM Cuprum Lubin	23–25	25–27	29–27	25–16	15–10	117–105	
24 Oct	18:30	Jastrzębski Węgiel	3–1	Indykpol AZS Olsztyn	25–27	25–20	25–17	25–12		100–76	
24 Oct	21:00	ZAKSA Kędzierzyn-Koźle	3–2	PSG Stal Nysa	23–25	21–25	25–21	25–22	24–22	118–115	
25 Oct	16:00	Enea Czarni Radom	1–3	Trefl Gdańsk	37–39	22–25	25–22	20–25		104–111	
25 Oct	21:00	Projekt Warsaw	3–0	GKS Katowice	25–18	25–22	26–24			76–64	
26 Oct	16:00	Ślepsk Malow Suwałki	0–3	Asseco Resovia	21–25	19–25	21–25			61–75	
26 Oct	18:30	Bogdanka LUK Lublin	2–3	Barkom-Kazhany Lviv	21–25	32–30	25–15	22–25	13–15	113–110	
9 Nov	20:30	Aluron CMC Warta Zawiercie	3–0	Norwid Częstochowa	25–22	25–22	25–14			75–58	

=== 3rd round ===
Date	Time		Score		Set 1	Set 2	Set 3	Set 4	Set 5	Total	Report
27 Oct	20:30	PSG Stal Nysa	2–3	PGE GiEK Skra Bełchatów	22–25	25–21	25–18	21–25	14–16	107–105	
28 Oct	14:45	Indykpol AZS Olsztyn	0–3	ZAKSA Kędzierzyn-Koźle	19–25	21–25	24–26			64–76	
28 Oct	17:30	Enea Czarni Radom	0–3	Projekt Warsaw	19–25	21–25	21–25			61–75	
28 Oct	20:30	Norwid Częstochowa	0–3	Jastrzębski Węgiel	15–25	20–25	21–25			56–75	
29 Oct	14:45	Asseco Resovia	3–2	Aluron CMC Warta Zawiercie	19–25	19–25	34–32	25–18	15–10	112–110	
29 Oct	17:30	Barkom-Kazhany Lviv	0–3	Trefl Gdańsk	22–25	22–25	20–25			64–75	
29 Oct	20:30	KGHM Cuprum Lubin	2–3	Bogdanka LUK Lublin	25–14	23–25	21–25	25–17	11–15	105–96	
30 Oct	17:30	GKS Katowice	0–3	Ślepsk Malow Suwałki	19–25	22–25	16–25			57–75	

=== 4th round ===
Date	Time		Score		Set 1	Set 2	Set 3	Set 4	Set 5	Total	Report
2 Nov	17:30	PGE GiEK Skra Bełchatów	1–3	Bogdanka LUK Lublin	16–25	22–25	26–24	19–25		83–99	
4 Nov	14:45	PSG Stal Nysa	2–3	Indykpol AZS Olsztyn	25–16	23–25	25–18	17–25	15–17	105–101	
4 Nov	17:30	Trefl Gdańsk	3–0	KGHM Cuprum Lubin	25–20	25–15	26–24			76–59	
4 Nov	20:30	Projekt Warsaw	3–1	Barkom-Kazhany Lviv	25–17	31–29	22–25	25–21		103–92	
5 Nov	14:45	Ślepsk Malow Suwałki	3–0	Enea Czarni Radom	25–18	25–18	25–19			75–55	
5 Nov	17:30	Aluron CMC Warta Zawiercie	3–2	GKS Katowice	25–23	25–19	23–25	22–25	15–12	110–104	
6 Nov	20:30	ZAKSA Kędzierzyn-Koźle	1–3	Norwid Częstochowa	26–24	22–25	23–25	21–25		92–99	
8 Nov	17:30	Jastrzębski Węgiel	3–1	Asseco Resovia	25–23	23–25	25–23	25–20		98–91	

=== 5th round ===
Date	Time		Score		Set 1	Set 2	Set 3	Set 4	Set 5	Total	Report
9 Nov	17:30	KGHM Cuprum Lubin	0–3	Projekt Warsaw	19–25	20–25	21–25			60–75	
10 Nov	20:30	Bogdanka LUK Lublin	3–2	Trefl Gdańsk	21–25	25–21	25–18	18–25	15–10	104–99	
11 Nov	14:45	Asseco Resovia	3–0	ZAKSA Kędzierzyn-Koźle	32–30	25–17	25–16			82–63	
11 Nov	17:30	GKS Katowice	1–3	Jastrzębski Węgiel	14–25	25–23	22–25	22–25		83–98	
12 Nov	14:45	Norwid Częstochowa	0–3	PSG Stal Nysa	22–25	16–25	18–25			56–75	
12 Nov	20:30	Barkom-Kazhany Lviv	3–1	Ślepsk Malow Suwałki	25–23	22–25	25–18	27–25		99–91	
13 Nov	17:30	Enea Czarni Radom	0–3	Aluron CMC Warta Zawiercie	18–25	17–25	20–25			55–75	
30 Dec	17:30	Indykpol AZS Olsztyn	1–3	PGE GiEK Skra Bełchatów	28–26	17–25	17–25	20–25		82–101	

=== 6th round ===
Date	Time		Score		Set 1	Set 2	Set 3	Set 4	Set 5	Total	Report
14 Nov	17:30	ZAKSA Kędzierzyn-Koźle	3–1	GKS Katowice	28–26	25–15	21–25	25–23		99–89	
14 Nov	20:30	PGE GiEK Skra Bełchatów	1–3	Trefl Gdańsk	24–26	26–28	25–20	16–25		91–99	
15 Nov	16:00	PSG Stal Nysa	2–3	Asseco Resovia	24–26	25–22	25–21	17–25	11–15	102–109	
15 Nov	18:30	Indykpol AZS Olsztyn	3–1	Norwid Częstochowa	21–25	27–25	25–21	26–24		99–95	
15 Nov	21:00	Projekt Warsaw	3–2	Bogdanka LUK Lublin	27–25	20–25	23–25	25–16	15–12	110–103	
16 Nov	16:00	Jastrzębski Węgiel	3–0	Enea Czarni Radom	25–20	25–20	25–18			75–58	
16 Nov	18:30	Ślepsk Malow Suwałki	0–3	KGHM Cuprum Lubin	20–25	23–25	17–25			60–75	
16 Nov	21:00	Aluron CMC Warta Zawiercie	3–0	Barkom-Kazhany Lviv	25–11	25–19	26–24			76–54	

=== 7th round ===
Date	Time		Score		Set 1	Set 2	Set 3	Set 4	Set 5	Total	Report
18 Nov	14:45	Asseco Resovia	3–0	Indykpol AZS Olsztyn	25–19	25–17	25–20			75–56	
18 Nov	17:30	Trefl Gdańsk	0–3	Projekt Warsaw	24–26	23–25	19–25			66–76	
18 Nov	20:30	Norwid Częstochowa	3–1	PGE GiEK Skra Bełchatów	23–25	27–25	25–23	25–19		100–92	
19 Nov	14:45	Enea Czarni Radom	0–3	ZAKSA Kędzierzyn-Koźle	26–28	21–25	20–25			67–78	
19 Nov	17:30	Barkom-Kazhany Lviv	0–3	Jastrzębski Węgiel	18–25	15–25	19–25			52–75	
19 Nov	20:30	GKS Katowice	1–3	PSG Stal Nysa	25–14	19–25	22–25	20–25		86–89	
20 Nov	17:30	KGHM Cuprum Lubin	0–3	Aluron CMC Warta Zawiercie	20–25	24–26	21–25			65–76	
20 Nov	20:30	Bogdanka LUK Lublin	3–0	Ślepsk Malow Suwałki	25–20	25–19	25–18			75–57	

=== 8th round ===
Date	Time		Score		Set 1	Set 2	Set 3	Set 4	Set 5	Total	Report
24 Nov	17:30	Ślepsk Malow Suwałki	0–3	Trefl Gdańsk	16–25	21–25	34–36			71–86	
25 Nov	14:45	PGE GiEK Skra Bełchatów	3–1	Projekt Warsaw	25–21	21–25	27–25	25–23		98–94	
25 Nov	17:30	ZAKSA Kędzierzyn-Koźle	1–3	Barkom-Kazhany Lviv	23–25	20–25	25–22	15–25		83–97	
25 Nov	20:30	Jastrzębski Węgiel	3–0	KGHM Cuprum Lubin	25–19	25–21	25–17			75–57	
26 Nov	14:45	PSG Stal Nysa	3–1	Enea Czarni Radom	25–17	19–25	25–22	25–23		94–87	
26 Nov	17:30	Norwid Częstochowa	1–3	Asseco Resovia	18–25	32–30	18–25	19–25		87–105	
26 Nov	20:30	Aluron CMC Warta Zawiercie	3–0	Bogdanka LUK Lublin	25–19	25–21	29–27			79–67	
27 Nov	17:30	Indykpol AZS Olsztyn	3–0	GKS Katowice	25–18	25–16	25–16			75–50	

=== 9th round ===
Date	Time		Score		Set 1	Set 2	Set 3	Set 4	Set 5	Total	Report
30 Nov	17:30	Barkom-Kazhany Lviv	1–3	PSG Stal Nysa	23–25	17–25	25–22	22–25		87–97	
1 Dec	17:30	GKS Katowice	3–2	Norwid Częstochowa	33–31	18–25	19–25	28–26	15–11	113–118	
1 Dec	20:30	Enea Czarni Radom	0–3	Indykpol AZS Olsztyn	16–25	25–27	17–25			58–77	
2 Dec	14:45	Asseco Resovia	3–0	PGE GiEK Skra Bełchatów	25–20	25–23	25–21			75–64	
2 Dec	17:30	Projekt Warsaw	3–0	Ślepsk Malow Suwałki	25–15	25–22	25–13			75–50	
2 Dec	20:30	Bogdanka LUK Lublin	0–3	Jastrzębski Węgiel	14–25	21–25	11–25			46–75	
3 Dec	14:45	Aluron CMC Warta Zawiercie	3–1	Trefl Gdańsk	25–21	29–31	25–17	25–15		104–84	
3 Dec	17:30	ZAKSA Kędzierzyn-Koźle	3–0	KGHM Cuprum Lubin	25–15	25–17	25–18			75–50	

=== 10th round ===
Date	Time		Score		Set 1	Set 2	Set 3	Set 4	Set 5	Total	Report
5 Dec	15:45	PGE GiEK Skra Bełchatów	1–3	Ślepsk Malow Suwałki	21–25	21–25	25–20	23–25		90–95	
5 Dec	18:20	Asseco Resovia	3–0	GKS Katowice	25–20	28–26	32–30			85–76	
5 Dec	21:00	Jastrzębski Węgiel	3–0	Trefl Gdańsk	25–20	25–20	30–28			80–68	
6 Dec	15:45	ZAKSA Kędzierzyn-Koźle	2–3	Bogdanka LUK Lublin	25–20	17–25	25–20	17–25	19–21	103–111	
6 Dec	18:20	Aluron CMC Warta Zawiercie	0–3	Projekt Warsaw	19–25	22–25	22–25			63–75	
6 Dec	21:00	Indykpol AZS Olsztyn	2–3	Barkom-Kazhany Lviv	25–23	24–26	20–25	25–13	14–16	108–103	
7 Dec	15:45	Norwid Częstochowa	2–3	Enea Czarni Radom	25–17	25–19	23–25	13–25	10–15	96–101	
21 Dec	20:30	PSG Stal Nysa	3–1	KGHM Cuprum Lubin	25–20	25–19	23–25	25–16		98–80	

=== 11th round ===
Date	Time		Score		Set 1	Set 2	Set 3	Set 4	Set 5	Total	Report
9 Dec	14:45	Ślepsk Malow Suwałki	0–3	Aluron CMC Warta Zawiercie	22–25	21–25	22–25			65–75	
9 Dec	17:30	GKS Katowice	0–3	PGE GiEK Skra Bełchatów	21–25	18–25	20–25			59–75	
9 Dec	20:30	KGHM Cuprum Lubin	0–3	Indykpol AZS Olsztyn	23–25	22–25	14–25			59–75	
10 Dec	14:45	Trefl Gdańsk	3–0	ZAKSA Kędzierzyn-Koźle	25–20	25–20	25–21			75–61	
10 Dec	17:30	Projekt Warsaw	3–1	Jastrzębski Węgiel	25–22	11–25	25–23	25–23		86–93	
10 Dec	20:30	Barkom-Kazhany Lviv	3–1	Norwid Częstochowa	20–25	25–18	25–16	25–22		95–81	
11 Dec	17:30	Enea Czarni Radom	2–3	Asseco Resovia	26–24	17–25	21–25	27–25	7–15	98–114	
11 Dec	20:30	Bogdanka LUK Lublin	3–1	PSG Stal Nysa	23–25	25–23	25–20	25–20		98–88	

=== 12th round ===
Date	Time		Score		Set 1	Set 2	Set 3	Set 4	Set 5	Total	Report
15 Dec	20:30	GKS Katowice	3–0	Enea Czarni Radom	25–21	25–19	25–22			75–62	
16 Dec	14:45	ZAKSA Kędzierzyn-Koźle	1–3	Projekt Warsaw	25–22	21–25	20–25	22–25		88–97	
16 Dec	17:30	Jastrzębski Węgiel	3–0	Ślepsk Malow Suwałki	25–17	25–18	25–19			75–54	
16 Dec	20:30	Norwid Częstochowa	3–1	KGHM Cuprum Lubin	21–25	25–21	27–25	26–24		99–95	
17 Dec	14:45	PGE GiEK Skra Bełchatów	0–3	Aluron CMC Warta Zawiercie	22–25	19–25	21–25			62–75	
17 Dec	17:30	Indykpol AZS Olsztyn	2–3	Bogdanka LUK Lublin	29–27	25–23	18–25	20–25	9–15	101–115	
17 Dec	20:30	PSG Stal Nysa	3–0	Trefl Gdańsk	25–22	25–20	25–22			75–64	
18 Dec	20:30	Asseco Resovia	3–1	Barkom-Kazhany Lviv	25–20	25–21	21–25	28–26		99–92	

=== 13th round ===
Date	Time		Score		Set 1	Set 2	Set 3	Set 4	Set 5	Total	Report
22 Dec	17:30	Ślepsk Malow Suwałki	0–3	ZAKSA Kędzierzyn-Koźle	23–25	30–32	22–25			75–82	
22 Dec	20:30	Bogdanka LUK Lublin	1–3	Norwid Częstochowa	25–23	25–27	20–25	18–25		88–100	
23 Dec	17:30	Trefl Gdańsk	3–0	Indykpol AZS Olsztyn	29–27	25–22	25–21			79–70	
23 Dec	20:30	Enea Czarni Radom	1–3	PGE GiEK Skra Bełchatów	23–25	25–22	19–25	26–28		93–100	
29 Dec	17:30	KGHM Cuprum Lubin	1–3	Asseco Resovia	25–27	17–25	25–16	22–25		89–93	
29 Dec	20:30	Projekt Warsaw	3–0	PSG Stal Nysa	25–19	25–15	25–22			75–56	
30 Dec	14:45	Aluron CMC Warta Zawiercie	3–1	Jastrzębski Węgiel	21–25	27–25	25–19	25–21		98–90	
30 Dec	20:30	Barkom-Kazhany Lviv	1–3	GKS Katowice	25–22	21–25	21–25	20–25		87–97	

=== 14th round ===
Date	Time		Score		Set 1	Set 2	Set 3	Set 4	Set 5	Total	Report
2 Jan	15:45	Indykpol AZS Olsztyn	3–0	Projekt Warsaw	27–25	25–19	25–19			77–63	
2 Jan	18:20	Enea Czarni Radom	3–1	Barkom-Kazhany Lviv	25–19	25–14	21–25	25–18		96–76	
2 Jan	21:00	PGE GiEK Skra Bełchatów	1–3	Jastrzębski Węgiel	22–25	18–25	25–23	18–25		83–98	
3 Jan	15:45	Norwid Częstochowa	3–1	Trefl Gdańsk	26–24	25–16	26–28	25–17		102–85	
3 Jan	18:20	ZAKSA Kędzierzyn-Koźle	1–3	Aluron CMC Warta Zawiercie	20–25	17–25	25–21	20–25		82–96	
3 Jan	21:00	Asseco Resovia	3–2	Bogdanka LUK Lublin	24–26	22–25	26–24	30–28	15–9	117–112	
4 Jan	15:45	PSG Stal Nysa	3–0	Ślepsk Malow Suwałki	25–23	25–19	25–18			75–60	
4 Jan	18:20	GKS Katowice	3–0	KGHM Cuprum Lubin	25–22	25–23	25–22			75–67	

=== 15th round ===
Date	Time		Score		Set 1	Set 2	Set 3	Set 4	Set 5	Total	Report
5 Jan	17:30	Barkom-Kazhany Lviv	2–3	PGE GiEK Skra Bełchatów	22–25	26–24	16–25	25–20	10–15	99–109	
5 Jan	20:30	Projekt Warsaw	3–1	Norwid Częstochowa	25–21	23–25	25–19	25–21		98–86	
6 Jan	12:30	ZAKSA Kędzierzyn-Koźle	1–3	Jastrzębski Węgiel	25–23	22–25	22–25	24–26		93–99	
6 Jan	14:45	Trefl Gdańsk	3–1	Asseco Resovia	25–20	25–23	31–33	25–19		106–95	
7 Jan	15:45	Aluron CMC Warta Zawiercie	3–0	PSG Stal Nysa	25–14	25–17	25–16			75–47	
7 Jan	17:30	Ślepsk Malow Suwałki	3–1	Indykpol AZS Olsztyn	25–23	27–25	18–25	26–24		96–97	
7 Jan	20:30	Bogdanka LUK Lublin	3–0	GKS Katowice	25–23	25–22	25–22			75–67	
8 Jan	17:30	KGHM Cuprum Lubin	3–0	Enea Czarni Radom	25–22	26–24	25–15			76–61	

=== 16th round ===
Date	Time		Score		Set 1	Set 2	Set 3	Set 4	Set 5	Total	Report
12 Jan	17:30	Ślepsk Malow Suwałki	3–0	Norwid Częstochowa	25–21	25–18	25–23			75–62	
12 Jan	20:30	Enea Czarni Radom	0–3	Bogdanka LUK Lublin	23–25	22–25	23–25			68–75	
13 Jan	14:45	Projekt Warsaw	1–3	Asseco Resovia	25–23	21–25	19–25	20–25		85–98	
13 Jan	17:30	Aluron CMC Warta Zawiercie	3–2	Indykpol AZS Olsztyn	25–17	21–25	23–25	26–24	15–12	110–103	
14 Jan	14:45	PGE GiEK Skra Bełchatów	3–0	ZAKSA Kędzierzyn-Koźle	25–12	28–26	25–22			78–60	
14 Jan	17:30	Jastrzębski Węgiel	3–1	PSG Stal Nysa	20–25	25–21	25–20	25–15		95–81	
14 Jan	20:30	Trefl Gdańsk	2–3	GKS Katowice	20–25	28–26	14–25	25–21	13–15	100–112	
1 Mar	20:30	Barkom-Kazhany Lviv	3–2	KGHM Cuprum Lubin	34–36	25–22	32–34	25–22	16–14	132–128	

=== 17th round ===
Date	Time		Score		Set 1	Set 2	Set 3	Set 4	Set 5	Total	Report
18 Jan	17:30	KGHM Cuprum Lubin	1–3	PGE GiEK Skra Bełchatów	25–20	22–25	19–25	18–25		84–95	
19 Jan	17:30	Barkom-Kazhany Lviv	3–1	Bogdanka LUK Lublin	29–27	37–35	22–25	29–27		117–114	
19 Jan	20:30	GKS Katowice	0–3	Projekt Warsaw	18–25	14–25	21–25			53–75	
20 Jan	14:45	Indykpol AZS Olsztyn	0–3	Jastrzębski Węgiel	22–25	20–25	22–25			64–75	
20 Jan	17:30	PSG Stal Nysa	0–3	ZAKSA Kędzierzyn-Koźle	21–25	17–25	22–25			60–75	
20 Jan	20:30	Trefl Gdańsk	3–0	Enea Czarni Radom	25–18	25–16	25–22			75–56	
21 Jan	14:45	Asseco Resovia	3–1	Ślepsk Malow Suwałki	25–14	21–25	25–15	25–22		96–76	
21 Jan	17:30	Norwid Częstochowa	0–3	Aluron CMC Warta Zawiercie	23–25	20–25	18–25			61–75	

=== 18th round ===
Date	Time		Score		Set 1	Set 2	Set 3	Set 4	Set 5	Total	Report
23 Jan	17:30	Bogdanka LUK Lublin	3–2	KGHM Cuprum Lubin	25–13	16–25	25–23	17–25	15–4	98–90	
23 Jan	20:30	Jastrzębski Węgiel	3–0	Norwid Częstochowa	25–20	27–25	25–19			77–64	
24 Jan	15:45	PGE GiEK Skra Bełchatów	3–1	PSG Stal Nysa	25–20	22–25	25–17	25–23		97–85	
24 Jan	18:20	Trefl Gdańsk	3–0	Barkom-Kazhany Lviv	25–17	25–17	25–18			75–52	
24 Jan	21:00	Projekt Warsaw	3–0	Enea Czarni Radom	25–17	25–12	25–22			75–51	
25 Jan	15:45	ZAKSA Kędzierzyn-Koźle	3–2	Indykpol AZS Olsztyn	19–25	25–20	27–29	25–23	15–13	111–110	
25 Jan	18:20	Aluron CMC Warta Zawiercie	3–1	Asseco Resovia	21–25	25–18	29–27	25–23		100–93	
25 Jan	21:00	Ślepsk Malow Suwałki	3–2	GKS Katowice	22–25	25–22	25–20	17–25	15–12	104–104	

=== 19th round ===
Date	Time		Score		Set 1	Set 2	Set 3	Set 4	Set 5	Total	Report
27 Jan	14:45	Bogdanka LUK Lublin	3–0	PGE GiEK Skra Bełchatów	25–17	27–25	25–19			77–61	
27 Jan	17:30	Barkom-Kazhany Lviv	0–3	Projekt Warsaw	17–25	13–25	19–25			49–75	
28 Jan	14:45	Asseco Resovia	1–3	Jastrzębski Węgiel	21–25	25–22	21–25	14–25		81–97	
28 Jan	17:30	GKS Katowice	1–3	Aluron CMC Warta Zawiercie	18–25	26–24	22–25	23–25		89–99	
29 Jan	17:30	Indykpol AZS Olsztyn	2–3	PSG Stal Nysa	25–16	28–30	22–25	25–23	10–15	110–109	
29 Jan	20:30	Enea Czarni Radom	3–1	Ślepsk Malow Suwałki	25–22	23–25	25–20	25–20		98–87	
30 Jan	17:30	KGHM Cuprum Lubin	3–2	Trefl Gdańsk	25–21	20–25	21–25	25–21	15–10	106–102	
1 Mar	17:30	Norwid Częstochowa	0–3	ZAKSA Kędzierzyn-Koźle	17–25	22–25	19–25			58–75	

=== 20th round ===
Date	Time		Score		Set 1	Set 2	Set 3	Set 4	Set 5	Total	Report
2 Feb	17:30	PGE GiEK Skra Bełchatów	0–3	Indykpol AZS Olsztyn	23–25	20–25	20–25			63–75	
2 Feb	20:30	PSG Stal Nysa	3–2	Norwid Częstochowa	20–25	26–24	22–25	25–22	15–9	108–105	
3 Feb	14:45	Jastrzębski Węgiel	3–1	GKS Katowice	23–25	25–18	25–20	25–19		98–82	
3 Feb	20:30	Ślepsk Malow Suwałki	0–3	Barkom-Kazhany Lviv	23–25	23–25	21–25			67–75	
4 Feb	14:45	ZAKSA Kędzierzyn-Koźle	0–3	Asseco Resovia	17–25	21–25	24–26			62–76	
4 Feb	17:30	Aluron CMC Warta Zawiercie	3–0	Enea Czarni Radom	25–19	25–21	25–20			75–60	
4 Feb	20:30	Projekt Warsaw	3–0	KGHM Cuprum Lubin	25–19	25–17	25–19			75–55	
7 Feb	17:30	Trefl Gdańsk	3–2	Bogdanka LUK Lublin	23–25	24–26	25–17	25–23	15–10	112–101	

=== 21st round ===
Date	Time		Score		Set 1	Set 2	Set 3	Set 4	Set 5	Total	Report
7 Feb	20:30	Norwid Częstochowa	0–3	Indykpol AZS Olsztyn	24–26	22–25	21–25			67–76	
10 Feb	14:45	Asseco Resovia	3–1	PSG Stal Nysa	25–13	25–19	17–25	25–16		92–73	
10 Feb	17:30	Enea Czarni Radom	0–3	Jastrzębski Węgiel	22–25	20–25	16–25			58–75	
10 Feb	20:30	GKS Katowice	3–0	ZAKSA Kędzierzyn-Koźle	25–10	32–30	25–19			82–59	
11 Feb	14:45	Bogdanka LUK Lublin	3–1	Projekt Warsaw	25–19	25–22	20–25	25–22		95–88	
11 Feb	17:30	Trefl Gdańsk	2–3	PGE GiEK Skra Bełchatów	19–25	21–25	25–22	27–25	11–15	103–112	
11 Feb	20:30	Barkom-Kazhany Lviv	3–2	Aluron CMC Warta Zawiercie	18–25	27–25	29–31	25–19	16–14	115–114	
12 Feb	20:30	KGHM Cuprum Lubin	3–1	Ślepsk Malow Suwałki	25–23	16–25	25–23	25–14		91–85	

=== 22nd round ===
Date	Time		Score		Set 1	Set 2	Set 3	Set 4	Set 5	Total	Report
16 Feb	20:30	ZAKSA Kędzierzyn-Koźle	3–0	Enea Czarni Radom	25–19	25–18	25–19			75–56	
17 Feb	14:45	Indykpol AZS Olsztyn	1–3	Asseco Resovia	25–21	18–25	26–24	25–20		94–90	
17 Feb	17:30	Jastrzębski Węgiel	0–3	Barkom-Kazhany Lviv	17–25	23–25	25–27			65–77	
17 Feb	20:30	Aluron CMC Warta Zawiercie	3–1	KGHM Cuprum Lubin	25–18	25–21	19–25	25–19		94–83	
18 Feb	14:45	Projekt Warsaw	3–0	Trefl Gdańsk	25–20	25–20	25–20			75–60	
18 Feb	17:30	Ślepsk Malow Suwałki	1–3	Bogdanka LUK Lublin	21–25	15–25	25–23	17–25		78–98	
18 Feb	20:30	PGE GiEK Skra Bełchatów	3–0	Norwid Częstochowa	25–22	25–23	25–12			75–57	
19 Feb	17:30	PSG Stal Nysa	3–1	GKS Katowice	33–31	19–25	25–22	25–13		102–91	

=== 23rd round ===
Date	Time		Score		Set 1	Set 2	Set 3	Set 4	Set 5	Total	Report
24 Feb	14:45	Barkom-Kazhany Lviv	1–3	ZAKSA Kędzierzyn-Koźle	25–20	22–25	23–25	23–25		93–95	
24 Feb	17:30	KGHM Cuprum Lubin	1–3	Jastrzębski Węgiel	25–21	11–25	16–25	20–25		72–96	
24 Feb	20:30	Bogdanka LUK Lublin	0–3	Aluron CMC Warta Zawiercie	21–25	19–25	21–25			61–75	
25 Feb	14:45	Asseco Resovia	1–3	Norwid Częstochowa	25–17	19–25	20–25	25–27		89–94	
25 Feb	17:30	Trefl Gdańsk	3–1	Ślepsk Malow Suwałki	25–20	22–25	25–16	25–18		97–79	
26 Feb	17:30	GKS Katowice	3–2	Indykpol AZS Olsztyn	18–25	25–23	23–25	25–20	15–10	106–103	
26 Feb	20:30	Enea Czarni Radom	3–1	PSG Stal Nysa	25–23	21–25	25–16	30–28		101–92	
20 Mar	20:30	Projekt Warsaw	3–0	PGE GiEK Skra Bełchatów	25–23	25–23	25–22			75–68	

=== 24th round ===
Date	Time		Score		Set 1	Set 2	Set 3	Set 4	Set 5	Total	Report
5 Mar	15:45	KGHM Cuprum Lubin	0–3	ZAKSA Kędzierzyn-Koźle	14–25	20–25	20–25			54–75	
5 Mar	18:20	Indykpol AZS Olsztyn	3–1	Enea Czarni Radom	23–25	25–22	25–17	25–19		98–83	
5 Mar	21:00	PSG Stal Nysa	3–0	Barkom-Kazhany Lviv	25–23	25–18	25–18			75–59	
6 Mar	15:45	Norwid Częstochowa	3–2	GKS Katowice	25–21	25–19	22–25	21–25	16–14	109–104	
6 Mar	18:20	Trefl Gdańsk	2–3	Aluron CMC Warta Zawiercie	11–25	22–25	25–23	25–22	11–15	94–110	
6 Mar	21:00	PGE GiEK Skra Bełchatów	0–3	Asseco Resovia	22–25	23–25	24–26			69–76	
7 Mar	15:45	Jastrzębski Węgiel	3–0	Bogdanka LUK Lublin	25–21	25–15	25–23			75–59	
7 Mar	18:20	Ślepsk Malow Suwałki	1–3	Projekt Warsaw	14–25	25–14	27–29	18–25		84–93	

=== 25th round ===
Date	Time		Score		Set 1	Set 2	Set 3	Set 4	Set 5	Total	Report
29 Feb	17:00	Ślepsk Malow Suwałki	3–2	PGE GiEK Skra Bełchatów	21–25	25–13	18–25	25–19	15–10	104–92	
9 Mar	14:45	GKS Katowice	2–3	Asseco Resovia	25–21	25–20	20–25	25–27	9–15	104–108	
9 Mar	17:30	Trefl Gdańsk	3–2	Jastrzębski Węgiel	20–25	30–28	28–26	20–25	15–13	113–117	
9 Mar	20:30	Barkom-Kazhany Lviv	3–0	Indykpol AZS Olsztyn	25–19	25–17	26–24			76–60	
10 Mar	14:45	Bogdanka LUK Lublin	3–0	ZAKSA Kędzierzyn-Koźle	25–16	25–21	25–21			75–58	
10 Mar	17:30	Projekt Warsaw	3–1	Aluron CMC Warta Zawiercie	32–30	25–21	24–26	25–23		106–100	
10 Mar	20:30	KGHM Cuprum Lubin	2–3	PSG Stal Nysa	19–25	25–17	25–18	23–25	6–15	98–100	
11 Mar	17:30	Enea Czarni Radom	3–0	Norwid Częstochowa	25–15	25–16	25–21			75–52	

=== 26th round ===
Date	Time		Score		Set 1	Set 2	Set 3	Set 4	Set 5	Total	Report
13 Mar	17:30	PSG Stal Nysa	1–3	Bogdanka LUK Lublin	21–25	25–21	25–27	23–25		94–98	
15 Mar	17:30	PGE GiEK Skra Bełchatów	3–1	GKS Katowice	25–18	25–19	25–27	25–18		100–82	
15 Mar	20:30	Asseco Resovia	3–0	Enea Czarni Radom	25–18	25–15	25–19			75–52	
16 Mar	20:30	Jastrzębski Węgiel	3–0	Projekt Warsaw	25–23	25–23	25–23			75–69	
17 Mar	18:00	ZAKSA Kędzierzyn-Koźle	1–3	Trefl Gdańsk	25–16	20–25	21–25	17–25		83–91	
17 Mar	20:30	Aluron CMC Warta Zawiercie	3–2	Ślepsk Malow Suwałki	24–26	24–26	25–22	25–20	15–10	113–104	
18 Mar	17:30	Indykpol AZS Olsztyn	2–3	KGHM Cuprum Lubin	23–25	27–25	26–24	21–25	10–15	107–114	
19 Mar	17:30	Norwid Częstochowa	0–3	Barkom-Kazhany Lviv	25–27	23–25	24–26			72–78	

=== 27th round ===
Date	Time		Score		Set 1	Set 2	Set 3	Set 4	Set 5	Total	Report
22 Mar	17:30	Trefl Gdańsk	1–3	PSG Stal Nysa	25–23	22–25	24–26	24–26		95–100	
22 Mar	20:30	Barkom-Kazhany Lviv	3–1	Asseco Resovia	19–25	25–20	25–18	25–22		94–85	
23 Mar	17:30	KGHM Cuprum Lubin	3–2	Norwid Częstochowa	19–25	25–19	30–28	22–25	15–12	111–109	
24 Mar	14:45	Bogdanka LUK Lublin	3–2	Indykpol AZS Olsztyn	15–25	17–25	25–23	25–14	16–14	98–101	
24 Mar	17:30	Ślepsk Malow Suwałki	2–3	Jastrzębski Węgiel	18–25	25–20	25–23	17–25	8–15	93–108	
24 Mar	20:30	Aluron CMC Warta Zawiercie	3–1	PGE GiEK Skra Bełchatów	22–25	32–30	25–23	25–18		104–96	
25 Mar	17:30	Enea Czarni Radom	3–0	GKS Katowice	25–21	25–20	25–20			75–61	
25 Mar	20:30	Projekt Warsaw	3–2	ZAKSA Kędzierzyn-Koźle	21–25	16–25	25–23	25–20	18–16	105–109	

=== 28th round ===
Date	Time		Score		Set 1	Set 2	Set 3	Set 4	Set 5	Total	Report
28 Mar	17:30	Asseco Resovia	3–0	KGHM Cuprum Lubin	25–23	25–17	25–22			75–62	
28 Mar	20:30	GKS Katowice	3–2	Barkom-Kazhany Lviv	20–25	25–19	26–28	25–18	15–13	111–103	
29 Mar	17:30	PSG Stal Nysa	3–2	Projekt Warsaw	20–25	20–25	26–24	25–17	15–11	106–102	
29 Mar	20:30	ZAKSA Kędzierzyn-Koźle	1–3	Ślepsk Malow Suwałki	25–16	21–25	21–25	23–25		90–91	
30 Mar	12:30	PGE GiEK Skra Bełchatów	3–1	Enea Czarni Radom	25–21	25–23	22–25	25–16		97–85	
30 Mar	14:45	Jastrzębski Węgiel	1–3	Aluron CMC Warta Zawiercie	10–25	21–25	25–23	21–25		77–98	
30 Mar	17:30	Indykpol AZS Olsztyn	1–3	Trefl Gdańsk	25–19	19–25	21–25	27–29		92–98	
30 Mar	20:30	Norwid Częstochowa	0–3	Bogdanka LUK Lublin	19–25	16–25	21–25			56–75	

=== 29th round ===
Date	Time		Score		Set 1	Set 2	Set 3	Set 4	Set 5	Total	Report
1 Apr	20:30	KGHM Cuprum Lubin	3–0	GKS Katowice	25–22	25–23	25–19			75–64	
2 Apr	15:45	Ślepsk Malow Suwałki	3–2	PSG Stal Nysa	25–17	23–25	25–17	24–26	15–9	112–94	
2 Apr	21:00	Aluron CMC Warta Zawiercie	3–0	ZAKSA Kędzierzyn-Koźle	25–19	25–17	25–23			75–59	
3 Apr	15:45	Jastrzębski Węgiel	3–0	PGE GiEK Skra Bełchatów	25–20	25–20	25–19			75–59	
3 Apr	18:20	Bogdanka LUK Lublin	1–3	Asseco Resovia	23–25	23–25	25–23	17–25		88–98	
3 Apr	21:00	Projekt Warsaw	2–3	Indykpol AZS Olsztyn	18–25	25–18	23–25	36–34	15–17	117–119	
4 Apr	17:30	Trefl Gdańsk	3–0	Norwid Częstochowa	27–25	25–14	25–22			77–61	
4 Apr	20:30	Barkom-Kazhany Lviv	2–3	Enea Czarni Radom	25–19	19–25	25–21	21–25	10–15	100–105	

=== 30th round ===
Date	Time		Score		Set 1	Set 2	Set 3	Set 4	Set 5	Total	Report
6 Apr	14:45	Jastrzębski Węgiel	3–1	ZAKSA Kędzierzyn-Koźle	25–21	20–25	25–13	25–19		95–78	
6 Apr	17:30	Indykpol AZS Olsztyn	3–1	Ślepsk Malow Suwałki	25–22	25–18	23–25	25–22		98–87	
6 Apr	20:30	PSG Stal Nysa	3–1	Aluron CMC Warta Zawiercie	25–18	22–25	25–22	25–15		97–80	
7 Apr	14:45	Asseco Resovia	3–1	Trefl Gdańsk	26–24	21–25	25–20	25–15		97–84	
7 Apr	17:30	PGE GiEK Skra Bełchatów	3–0	Barkom-Kazhany Lviv	27–25	25–23	25–17			77–65	
7 Apr	20:30	Norwid Częstochowa	0–3	Projekt Warsaw	17–25	21–25	14–25			52–75	
8 Apr	17:30	GKS Katowice	3–1	Bogdanka LUK Lublin	25–23	25–21	19–25	26–24		95–93	
8 Apr	20:30	Enea Czarni Radom	1–3	KGHM Cuprum Lubin	25–21	27–29	18–25	19–25		89–100	

== Playoffs ==
Quarterfinals
Jastrzębski Węgiel (1)	3	3
Indykpol AZS Olsztyn (8)	0	1
Trefl Gdańsk (5)	2	1
Asseco Resovia (4)	3	3
Projekt Warsaw (3)	3	0	15
Bogdanka LUK Lublin (6)	1	3	12
PSG Stal Nysa (7)	0	2
Aluron CMC Warta Zawiercie (2)	3	3

Semifinals
Jastrzębski Węgiel (1)	3	3
Asseco Resovia (4)	2	2
Projekt Warsaw (3)	0	1
Aluron CMC Warta Zawiercie (2)	3	3

Final
Jastrzębski Węgiel (1)	3	1	3
Aluron CMC Warta Zawiercie (2)	0	3	1

=== Quarterfinals ===
- Aggregate score is counted as follows: 3 points for 3–0 or 3–1 win, 2 points for 3–2 win, 1 point for 2–3 loss.
- In case the teams are tied after two legs, a Golden Set is played immediately at the completion of the second leg.

Team 1	Agg.	Team 2	1st leg	2nd leg	Golden Set
Indykpol AZS Olsztyn	0–6	Jastrzębski Węgiel	0–3	1–3	
Trefl Gdańsk	1–5	Asseco Resovia	2–3	1–3	
Bogdanka LUK Lublin	3–3	Projekt Warsaw	1–3	3–0	12–15
PSG Stal Nysa	1–5	Aluron CMC Warta Zawiercie	0–3	2–3	

==== Quarterfinal A ====
Date	Time		Score		Set 1	Set 2	Set 3	Set 4	Set 5	Total	Report
10 Apr	18:20	Indykpol AZS Olsztyn	0–3	Jastrzębski Węgiel	18–25	16–25	19–25			53–75	
13 Apr	14:45	Jastrzębski Węgiel	3–1	Indykpol AZS Olsztyn	21–25	25–14	25–13	25–23		96–75	

==== Quarterfinal B ====
Date	Time		Score		Set 1	Set 2	Set 3	Set 4	Set 5	Total	Report
11 Apr	18:20	Trefl Gdańsk	2–3	Asseco Resovia	19–25	27–25	25–23	16–25	11–15	98–113	
14 Apr	17:30	Asseco Resovia	3–1	Trefl Gdańsk	26–28	25–23	25–14	25–16		101–81	

==== Quarterfinal C ====
Date	Time		Score		Set 1	Set 2	Set 3	Set 4	Set 5	Total	Report
11 Apr	21:00	Bogdanka LUK Lublin	1–3	Projekt Warsaw	25–16	13–25	19–25	19–25		76–91	
14 Apr	14:45	Projekt Warsaw	0–3	Bogdanka LUK Lublin	20–25	22–25	19–25			61–75	
Golden set		Projekt Warsaw	15–12	Bogdanka LUK Lublin							

==== Quarterfinal D ====
Date	Time		Score		Set 1	Set 2	Set 3	Set 4	Set 5	Total	Report
10 Apr	21:00	PSG Stal Nysa	0–3	Aluron CMC Warta Zawiercie	26–28	19–25	19–25			64–78	
13 Apr	17:30	Aluron CMC Warta Zawiercie	3–2	PSG Stal Nysa	23–25	20–25	25–15	25–21	15–9	108–95	

=== Semifinals ===
- Aggregate score is counted as follows: 3 points for 3–0 or 3–1 win, 2 points for 3–2 win, 1 point for 2–3 loss.
- In case the teams are tied after two legs, a Golden Set is played immediately at the completion of the second leg.

Team 1	Agg.	Team 2	1st leg	2nd leg
Asseco Resovia	2–4	Jastrzębski Węgiel	2–3	2–3
Projekt Warsaw	0–6	Aluron CMC Warta Zawiercie	0–3	1–3

==== Semifinal A ====
Date	Time		Score		Set 1	Set 2	Set 3	Set 4	Set 5	Total	Report
17 Apr	17:30	Asseco Resovia	2–3	Jastrzębski Węgiel	32–30	21–25	28–30	25–22	10–15	116–122	
20 Apr	14:45	Jastrzębski Węgiel	3–2	Asseco Resovia	25–20	20–25	25–27	29–27	15–13	114–112	

==== Semifinal B ====
Date	Time		Score		Set 1	Set 2	Set 3	Set 4	Set 5	Total	Report
17 Apr	20:30	Projekt Warsaw	0–3	Aluron CMC Warta Zawiercie	24–26	16–25	25–27			65–78	
20 Apr	17:30	Aluron CMC Warta Zawiercie	3–1	Projekt Warsaw	22–25	25–18	25–22	25–17		97–82	

=== Finals ===
- (to 2 victories)

Date	Time		Score		Set 1	Set 2	Set 3	Set 4	Set 5	Total	Report
24 Apr	20:30	Aluron CMC Warta Zawiercie	0–3	Jastrzębski Węgiel	18–25	25–27	23–25			66–77	
27 Apr	18:00	Jastrzębski Węgiel	1–3	Aluron CMC Warta Zawiercie	25–27	25–22	19–25	23–25		92–99	
28 Apr	14:45	Jastrzębski Węgiel	3–1	Aluron CMC Warta Zawiercie	25–19	21–25	25–23	25–18		96–85	

== Placement matches ==
=== 13th place ===
Date	Time		Score		Set 1	Set 2	Set 3	Set 4	Set 5	Total	Report
15 Apr	20:30	GKS Katowice	3–0	KGHM Cuprum Lubin	25–20	25–18	25–23			75–61	
22 Apr	18:00	KGHM Cuprum Lubin	3–1	GKS Katowice	23–25	25–19	25–20	26–24		99–88	
Golden set		KGHM Cuprum Lubin	15–17	GKS Katowice							

=== 11th place ===
Date	Time		Score		Set 1	Set 2	Set 3	Set 4	Set 5	Total	Report
15 Apr	17:30	Ślepsk Malow Suwałki	3–0	Barkom-Kazhany Lviv	25–19	25–15	25–13			75–47	
21 Apr	20:30	Barkom-Kazhany Lviv	1–3	Ślepsk Malow Suwałki	21–25	25–15	21–25	18–25		85–90	

=== 9th place ===
Date	Time		Score		Set 1	Set 2	Set 3	Set 4	Set 5	Total	Report
14 Apr	20:30	ZAKSA Kędzierzyn-Koźle	1–3	PGE GiEK Skra Bełchatów	22–25	25–18	22–25	19–25		88–93	
17 Apr	15:00	PGE GiEK Skra Bełchatów	2–3	ZAKSA Kędzierzyn-Koźle	18–25	25–22	25–22	16–25	9–15	93–109	

=== 7th place ===
Date	Time		Score		Set 1	Set 2	Set 3	Set 4	Set 5	Total	Report
18 Apr	17:30	Indykpol AZS Olsztyn	3–1	PSG Stal Nysa	16–25	25–21	28–26	25–20		94–92	
21 Apr	14:45	PSG Stal Nysa	3–1	Indykpol AZS Olsztyn	27–25	24–26	25–16	26–24		102–91	
Golden set		PSG Stal Nysa	15–13	Indykpol AZS Olsztyn							

=== 5th place ===
Date	Time		Score		Set 1	Set 2	Set 3	Set 4	Set 5	Total	Report
18 Apr	20:30	Bogdanka LUK Lublin	3–0	Trefl Gdańsk	25–19	25–19	25–14			75–52	
22 Apr	20:30	Trefl Gdańsk	1–3	Bogdanka LUK Lublin	22–25	27–25	22–25	17–25		88–100	

=== 3rd place ===
- (to 2 victories)

Date	Time		Score		Set 1	Set 2	Set 3	Set 4	Set 5	Total	Report
23 Apr	20:30	Asseco Resovia	0–3	Projekt Warsaw	25–27	28–30	19–25			72–82	
26 Apr	20:30	Projekt Warsaw	3–0	Asseco Resovia	26–24	29–27	25–21			80–72	

== Final standings ==
Qualified for the 2024–25 CEV Champions League
Qualified for the 2024–25 CEV Cup
Qualified for the 2024–25 CEV Challenge Cup
Relegation to the 1st league

Rank	Team
1st place, gold medalist(s)	Jastrzębski Węgiel
2nd place, silver medalist(s)	Aluron CMC Warta Zawiercie
3rd place, bronze medalist(s)	Projekt Warsaw
4	Asseco Resovia
5	Bogdanka LUK Lublin
6	Trefl Gdańsk
7	PSG Stal Nysa
8	Indykpol AZS Olsztyn
9	PGE GiEK Skra Bełchatów
10	ZAKSA Kędzierzyn-Koźle
11	Ślepsk Malow Suwałki
12	Barkom-Kazhany Lviv
13	GKS Katowice
14	KGHM Cuprum Lubin
15	Norwid Częstochowa
16	Enea Czarni Radom

2024 Polish champions
Jastrzębski Węgiel
4th title

== Squads ==
Aluron CMC Warta Zawiercie
No.	Name	Date of birth	Height	Position
2	(Poland) Bartosz Kwolek	17 July 1997	1.93 m (6 ft 4 in)	outside hitter
4	(Australia) Luke Perry	20 November 1995	1.80 m (5 ft 11 in)	libero
5	(Poland) Miłosz Zniszczoł	2 July 1986	2.00 m (6 ft 7 in)	middle blocker
6	(Poland) Mariusz Schamlewski	16 January 1991	1.98 m (6 ft 6 in)	middle blocker
7	(Poland) Szymon Gregorowicz	7 March 1994	1.83 m (6 ft 0 in)	libero
8	(Poland) Tomasz Kalembka	30 June 1991	2.05 m (6 ft 9 in)	middle blocker
9	(Poland) Daniel Gąsior	9 January 1995	2.00 m (6 ft 7 in)	opposite
10	(France) Thibault Rossard	28 August 1993	1.94 m (6 ft 4 in)	outside hitter
13	(Canada) Samuel Cooper	17 June 2001	2.00 m (6 ft 7 in)	outside hitter
15	(Portugal) Miguel Tavares	2 March 1993	1.92 m (6 ft 4 in)	setter
17	(France) Trévor Clévenot	28 June 1994	1.99 m (6 ft 6 in)	outside hitter
18	(Poland) Michał Kozłowski	16 February 1985	1.91 m (6 ft 3 in)	setter
20	(Poland) Mateusz Bieniek	5 April 1994	2.08 m (6 ft 10 in)	middle blocker
21	(Poland) Karol Butryn	18 June 1993	1.94 m (6 ft 4 in)	opposite
25	(Poland) Michał Szalacha	15 January 1994	2.02 m (6 ft 8 in)	middle blocker
99	(Poland) Patryk Łaba	30 July 1991	1.88 m (6 ft 2 in)	outside hitter
Head coach:		(Poland) Michał Winiarski		

Asseco Resovia
No.	Name	Date of birth	Height	Position
1	(Norway) Jonas Kvalen	6 June 1992	1.96 m (6 ft 5 in)	outside hitter
2	(Poland) Jakub Lewandowski	16 July 1996	2.03 m (6 ft 8 in)	middle blocker
3	(Poland) Michał Kędzierski	9 August 1994	1.94 m (6 ft 4 in)	setter
4	(Poland) Krzysztof Rejno	22 February 1993	2.03 m (6 ft 8 in)	middle blocker
5	(Poland) Jakub Bucki	13 August 1988	1.97 m (6 ft 6 in)	opposite
6	(Poland) Karol Kłos	8 August 1989	2.01 m (6 ft 7 in)	middle blocker
7	(Poland) Jakub Kochanowski	17 July 1997	1.99 m (6 ft 6 in)	middle blocker
8	(Poland) Adrian Staszewski	31 May 1990	1.98 m (6 ft 6 in)	outside hitter
9	(France) Stéphen Boyer	10 April 1996	1.96 m (6 ft 5 in)	opposite
10	(Poland) Łukasz Kozub	3 November 1997	1.86 m (6 ft 1 in)	setter
11	(Poland) Fabian Drzyzga	3 January 1990	1.96 m (6 ft 5 in)	setter
13	(Poland) Michał Potera	6 March 1988	1.83 m (6 ft 0 in)	libero
14	(France) Yacine Louati	4 March 1992	1.98 m (6 ft 6 in)	outside hitter
16	(Poland) Paweł Zatorski	21 June 1990	1.84 m (6 ft 0 in)	libero
17	(Poland) Bartłomiej Mordyl	21 January 1995	2.01 m (6 ft 7 in)	middle blocker
18	(Slovenia) Klemen Čebulj	21 February 1992	2.02 m (6 ft 8 in)	outside hitter
59	(United States) Torey DeFalco	10 April 1997	1.98 m (6 ft 6 in)	outside hitter
Head coach:		(Italy) Giampaolo Medei		

Barkom-Kazhany Lviv
No.	Name	Date of birth	Height	Position
1	(France) Moussé Gueye	11 November 1996	1.98 m (6 ft 6 in)	middle blocker
2	(Ukraine) Illia Kovalov	31 August 1996	1.98 m (6 ft 6 in)	outside hitter
3	(Ukraine) Bohdan Mazenko	18 May 1996	1.98 m (6 ft 6 in)	middle blocker
4	(Ukraine) Oleh Shevchenko	8 January 1993	1.94 m (6 ft 4 in)	outside hitter
6	(Ukraine) Oleksii Holoven	12 January 1999	1.96 m (6 ft 5 in)	setter
7	(Argentina) Luciano Palonsky	8 July 1999	1.98 m (6 ft 6 in)	outside hitter
9	(Latvia) Kristers Dardzāns	9 October 2001	2.02 m (6 ft 8 in)	opposite
11	(Ukraine) Dmytro Kanaiev	3 October 1997	1.77 m (5 ft 10 in)	libero
12	(Ukraine) Vladyslav Shchurov	27 April 2001	2.07 m (6 ft 9 in)	middle blocker
13	(Ukraine) Vasyl Tupchii	13 January 1992	1.96 m (6 ft 5 in)	opposite
14	(Ukraine) Illia Dovhyi	1 August 1998	2.00 m (6 ft 7 in)	middle blocker
16	(Ukraine) Vitalii Kucher	27 October 1997	1.99 m (6 ft 6 in)	outside hitter
17	(Latvia) Deniss Petrovs	31 August 1986	1.88 m (6 ft 2 in)	setter
21	(Ukraine) Yaroslav Pampushko	11 January 2001	1.78 m (5 ft 10 in)	libero
Head coach:		(Latvia) Uģis Krastiņš		

Bogdanka LUK Lublin
No.	Name	Date of birth	Height	Position
1	(Poland) Jan Nowakowski	17 May 1994	2.02 m (6 ft 8 in)	middle blocker
2	(Poland) Maksym Kędzierski	13 March 2003	1.83 m (6 ft 0 in)	libero
3	(Poland) Maciej Krysiak	7 January 1999	1.92 m (6 ft 4 in)	outside hitter
4	(Poland) Marcin Komenda	24 May 1996	1.98 m (6 ft 6 in)	setter
5	(Poland) Marcin Kania	14 February 1996	2.03 m (6 ft 8 in)	middle blocker
6	(Poland) Mateusz Malinowski	6 May 1992	1.98 m (6 ft 6 in)	opposite
7	(Poland) Jakub Wachnik	16 February 1993	2.02 m (6 ft 8 in)	outside hitter
9	(Portugal) Alexandre Ferreira	13 November 1991	2.00 m (6 ft 7 in)	outside hitter
10	(Germany) Tobias Brand	9 July 1998	1.95 m (6 ft 5 in)	outside hitter
11	(Poland) Jakub Nowosielski	11 February 1993	1.93 m (6 ft 4 in)	setter
17	(Brazil) Thales Hoss	26 April 1989	1.90 m (6 ft 3 in)	libero
18	(Poland) Damian Schulz	26 February 1990	2.08 m (6 ft 10 in)	opposite
20	(Poland) Maciej Zając	5 March 2003	1.98 m (6 ft 6 in)	middle blocker
23	(Poland) Damian Hudzik	14 May 1998	2.04 m (6 ft 8 in)	middle blocker
Head coach:		(Italy) Massimo Botti		

Enea Czarni Radom
No.	Name	Date of birth	Height	Position
2	(Poland) Michał Ostrowski	29 March 1990	2.03 m (6 ft 8 in)	middle blocker
5	(Canada) Brodie Hofer	27 April 2000	1.99 m (6 ft 6 in)	outside hitter
6	(Poland) Wojciech Kraj	2 April 2000	2.10 m (6 ft 11 in)	middle blocker
7	(Poland) Rafał Buszek	28 April 1987	1.96 m (6 ft 5 in)	outside hitter
9	(Serbia) Vuk Todorović	23 April 1998	1.90 m (6 ft 3 in)	setter
10	(Poland) Mateusz Biernat	19 May 1992	1.95 m (6 ft 5 in)	setter
12	(Poland) Konrad Formela	8 March 1995	1.94 m (6 ft 4 in)	outside hitter
13	(Poland) Tomasz Piotrowski	2 September 1997	1.98 m (6 ft 6 in)	outside hitter
14	(Serbia) Nikola Meljanac	15 January 1999	2.01 m (6 ft 7 in)	opposite
15	(Poland) Bartosz Gomułka	30 May 2002	2.02 m (6 ft 8 in)	opposite
18	(Poland) Maciej Nowowsiak	20 September 2001	1.88 m (6 ft 2 in)	libero
20	(Poland) Dominik Teklak	17 March 2000	1.84 m (6 ft 0 in)	libero
21	(Poland) Wiktor Rajsner	13 April 1999	2.05 m (6 ft 9 in)	middle blocker
24	(Poland) Mateusz Kufka	8 November 2003	1.97 m (6 ft 6 in)	middle blocker
27	(Poland) Przemysław Smoliński	27 November 1992	2.01 m (6 ft 7 in)	middle blocker
Head coach:		(Poland) Paweł Woicki → (Argentina) Waldo Kantor		

GKS Katowice
No.	Name	Date of birth	Height	Position
1	(Poland) Marcin Waliński	24 October 1990	1.96 m (6 ft 5 in)	outside hitter
2	(Poland) Jakub Szymański	25 March 1998	2.00 m (6 ft 7 in)	outside hitter
3	(Poland) Wiktor Mielczarek	10 January 1998	1.90 m (6 ft 3 in)	outside hitter
4	(Poland) Bartosz Mariański	26 May 1992	1.87 m (6 ft 2 in)	libero
6	(Poland) Piotr Fenoszyn	31 August 1996	1.93 m (6 ft 4 in)	setter
7	(Poland) Jakub Jarosz	10 February 1987	1.97 m (6 ft 6 in)	opposite
8	(Italy) Davide Saitta	23 June 1987	1.89 m (6 ft 2 in)	setter
9	(Norway) Jonas Kvalen	6 June 1992	1.96 m (6 ft 5 in)	outside hitter
10	(Poland) Damian Domagała	23 April 1998	1.99 m (6 ft 6 in)	opposite
11	(Czech Republic) Lukáš Vašina	6 July 1999	1.96 m (6 ft 5 in)	outside hitter
13	(Poland) Sebastian Adamczyk	28 February 1999	2.08 m (6 ft 10 in)	middle blocker
15	(Poland) Bartłomiej Krulicki	15 September 1993	2.05 m (6 ft 9 in)	middle blocker
23	(Poland) Dawid Ogórek	30 July 1990	1.84 m (6 ft 0 in)	libero
27	(Poland) Maciej Wóz	31 October 2000	2.04 m (6 ft 8 in)	middle blocker
33	(Poland) Łukasz Usowicz	13 August 1997	2.03 m (6 ft 8 in)	middle blocker
34	(Poland) Łukasz Kozub	3 November 1997	1.86 m (6 ft 1 in)	setter
Head coach:		(Poland) Grzegorz Słaby		

Indykpol AZS Olsztyn
No.	Name	Date of birth	Height	Position
1	(Brazil) Alan Souza	21 March 1994	2.02 m (6 ft 8 in)	opposite
2	(Germany) Moritz Karlitzek	12 August 1996	1.91 m (6 ft 3 in)	outside hitter
5	(Poland) Karol Jankiewicz	21 February 1996	1.85 m (6 ft 1 in)	setter
6	(Poland) Szymon Jakubiszak	13 February 1998	2.08 m (6 ft 10 in)	middle blocker
7	(Poland) Dawid Siwczyk	13 June 1993	1.97 m (6 ft 6 in)	middle blocker
8	(Poland) Cezary Sapiński	28 September 1994	2.03 m (6 ft 8 in)	middle blocker
9	(Poland) Nicolas Szerszeń	31 December 1996	1.95 m (6 ft 5 in)	outside hitter
10	(Poland) Jakub Majchrzak	13 May 2004	2.08 m (6 ft 10 in)	middle blocker
11	(Argentina) Manuel Armoa	1 December 2002	1.98 m (6 ft 6 in)	outside hitter
12	(Poland) Kamil Szymendera	30 April 2003	1.92 m (6 ft 4 in)	outside hitter
14	(Poland) Kuba Hawryluk	8 September 2003	1.81 m (5 ft 11 in)	libero
15	(Poland) Jakub Ciunajtis	6 August 1998	1.77 m (5 ft 10 in)	libero
17	(Poland) Mateusz Janikowski	5 May 1999	2.01 m (6 ft 7 in)	outside hitter
91	(United States) Joshua Tuaniga	18 March 1997	1.91 m (6 ft 3 in)	setter
Head coach:		(Argentina) Javier Weber		

Jastrzębski Węgiel
No.	Name	Date of birth	Height	Position
2	(Latvia) Edvīns Skrūders	13 November 1997	1.88 m (6 ft 2 in)	setter
3	(Poland) Jakub Popiwczak	17 April 1996	1.80 m (5 ft 11 in)	libero
4	(Poland) Adrian Markiewicz	12 April 2002	2.11 m (6 ft 11 in)	middle blocker
6	(France) Benjamin Toniutti	30 October 1989	1.83 m (6 ft 0 in)	setter
7	(Croatia) Marko Sedlaček	29 July 1996	2.02 m (6 ft 8 in)	outside hitter
9	(France) Jean Patry	27 December 1996	2.07 m (6 ft 9 in)	opposite
10	(Canada) Ryan Sclater	3 June 1991	1.99 m (6 ft 6 in)	opposite
13	(Poland) Yuriy Gladyr	8 July 1984	2.02 m (6 ft 8 in)	middle blocker
16	(Poland) Bartosz Makoś	1 August 1998	1.76 m (5 ft 9 in)	libero
17	(Poland) Jarosław Macionczyk	22 January 1979	1.90 m (6 ft 3 in)	setter
21	(Poland) Tomasz Fornal	31 August 1997	2.00 m (6 ft 7 in)	outside hitter
22	(Poland) Moustapha M'Baye	22 January 1992	1.98 m (6 ft 6 in)	middle blocker
26	(Poland) Rafał Szymura	29 August 1995	1.97 m (6 ft 6 in)	outside hitter
31	(Poland) Mateusz Jóźwik	30 May 1996	1.95 m (6 ft 5 in)	outside hitter
99	(Poland) Norbert Huber	14 August 1998	2.07 m (6 ft 9 in)	middle blocker
Head coach:		(Argentina) Marcelo Méndez		

KGHM Cuprum Lubin
No.	Name	Date of birth	Height	Position
1	(Poland) Hubert Węgrzyn	6 January 2000	2.00 m (6 ft 7 in)	middle blocker
4	(Poland) Seweryn Lipiński	1 January 2001	2.00 m (6 ft 7 in)	middle blocker
5	(Poland) Wojciech Ferens	5 April 1991	1.94 m (6 ft 4 in)	outside hitter
6	(Poland) Adam Lorenc	30 October 1998	1.98 m (6 ft 6 in)	opposite
7	(Poland) Kajetan Kubicki	9 February 2003	1.90 m (6 ft 3 in)	setter
8	(Brazil) Danilo Gelinski	13 March 1990	1.93 m (6 ft 4 in)	setter
9	(Poland) Paweł Pietraszko	5 October 1990	2.01 m (6 ft 7 in)	middle blocker
11	(Poland) Dominik Czerny	4 April 2003	1.96 m (6 ft 5 in)	outside hitter
13	(Poland) Mateusz Masłowski	13 June 1997	1.85 m (6 ft 1 in)	libero
18	(Poland) Maksymilian Granieczny	7 July 2005	1.77 m (5 ft 10 in)	libero
21	(Poland) Kamil Kwasowski	13 September 1990	1.97 m (6 ft 6 in)	outside hitter
22	(United States) Jake Hanes	3 May 1998	2.08 m (6 ft 10 in)	opposite
23	(Austria) Alexander Berger	27 September 1988	1.93 m (6 ft 4 in)	outside hitter
99	(Poland) Jakub Strulak	12 May 2001	2.10 m (6 ft 11 in)	middle blocker
Head coach:		(Poland) Paweł Rusek		

Norwid Częstochowa
No.	Name	Date of birth	Height	Position
1	(Canada) Byron Keturakis	11 January 1996	2.00 m (6 ft 7 in)	setter
2	(Norway) Oskar Espeland	9 October 2001	1.96 m (6 ft 5 in)	outside hitter
3	(Poland) Mateusz Borkowski	18 February 2002	1.99 m (6 ft 6 in)	opposite
4	(Poland) Bartosz Schmidt	3 June 1991	2.00 m (6 ft 7 in)	middle blocker
5	(United States) Kaleb Jenness	19 April 2000	2.00 m (6 ft 7 in)	outside hitter
6	(Poland) Łukasz Rymarski	5 February 1997	2.05 m (6 ft 9 in)	middle blocker
7	(Poland) Marcin Jaskuła	11 February 1998	1.80 m (5 ft 11 in)	libero
8	(Poland) Krzysztof Gibek	14 January 1995	1.91 m (6 ft 3 in)	outside hitter
9	(Tunisia) Aymen Bouguerra	1 November 2001	1.98 m (6 ft 6 in)	outside hitter
10	(Poland) Damian Kogut	3 January 1997	1.91 m (6 ft 3 in)	outside hitter
12	(Japan) Sho Takahashi	2 January 1995	1.83 m (6 ft 0 in)	libero
15	(Poland) Bartłomiej Janus	19 January 1995	2.03 m (6 ft 8 in)	middle blocker
16	(Poland) Rafał Sobański	10 August 1991	1.95 m (6 ft 5 in)	opposite
17	(Poland) Tomasz Kowalski	12 June 1991	2.02 m (6 ft 8 in)	setter
19	(Poland) Dawid Dulski	1 November 2002	2.10 m (6 ft 11 in)	opposite
61	(Poland) Piotr Hain	26 February 1991	2.07 m (6 ft 9 in)	middle blocker
Head coach:		(Poland) Leszek Hudziak		

PGE GiEK Skra Bełchatów
No.	Name	Date of birth	Height	Position
1	(Poland) Dawid Konarski	31 August 1989	1.98 m (6 ft 6 in)	opposite
3	(Poland) Wiktor Nowak	21 May 1999	1.86 m (6 ft 1 in)	setter
7	(Poland) Bartłomiej Lemański	19 March 1996	2.16 m (7 ft 1 in)	middle blocker
8	(Poland) Przemysław Kupka	9 March 2001	2.06 m (6 ft 9 in)	opposite
9	(Poland) Łukasz Wiśniewski	3 February 1989	1.98 m (6 ft 6 in)	middle blocker
11	(Bulgaria) Iliya Petkov	10 October 1996	2.01 m (6 ft 7 in)	middle blocker
12	(Poland) Grzegorz Łomacz	1 October 1987	1.88 m (6 ft 2 in)	setter
13	(Poland) Mateusz Nowak	29 February 2004	2.14 m (7 ft 0 in)	middle blocker
14	(France) Benjamin Diez	4 April 1998	1.83 m (6 ft 0 in)	libero
15	(Poland) Mateusz Mika	21 January 1991	2.06 m (6 ft 9 in)	outside hitter
16	(Poland) Mateusz Poręba	24 August 1999	2.04 m (6 ft 8 in)	middle blocker
20	(Romania) Adrian Aciobăniței	24 August 1997	1.95 m (6 ft 5 in)	outside hitter
21	(Poland) Jakub Rybicki	1 November 1998	1.95 m (6 ft 5 in)	outside hitter
23	(Poland) Bartłomiej Lipiński	16 November 1996	2.01 m (6 ft 7 in)	outside hitter
59	(Poland) Kajetan Marek	6 January 1994	1.86 m (6 ft 1 in)	libero
99	(France) Pierre Derouillon	6 June 1999	1.94 m (6 ft 4 in)	outside hitter
Head coach:		(Italy) Andrea Gardini		

Projekt Warsaw
No.	Name	Date of birth	Height	Position
1	(Poland) Jakub Kowalczyk	26 June 1986	2.00 m (6 ft 7 in)	middle blocker
3	(Serbia) Srećko Lisinac	17 May 1992	2.05 m (6 ft 9 in)	middle blocker
4	(Poland) Maciej Stępień	22 June 1994	1.93 m (6 ft 4 in)	setter
5	(Poland) Jan Firlej	26 September 1996	1.88 m (6 ft 2 in)	setter
7	(France) Kévin Tillie	2 November 1990	2.01 m (6 ft 7 in)	outside hitter
8	(Poland) Andrzej Wrona	27 December 1988	2.06 m (6 ft 9 in)	middle blocker
9	(Poland) Bartłomiej Bołądź	28 September 1994	2.04 m (6 ft 8 in)	opposite
10	(Ukraine) Yurii Semeniuk	12 May 1994	2.10 m (6 ft 11 in)	middle blocker
11	(Poland) Piotr Nowakowski	18 December 1987	2.05 m (6 ft 9 in)	middle blocker
12	(Poland) Artur Szalpuk	20 March 1995	2.02 m (6 ft 8 in)	outside hitter
13	(Belgium) Igor Grobelny	8 June 1993	1.94 m (6 ft 4 in)	outside hitter
16	(Poland) Jędrzej Gruszczyński	13 November 1997	1.86 m (6 ft 1 in)	libero
18	(Poland) Damian Wojtaszek	7 September 1988	1.80 m (5 ft 11 in)	libero
19	(United States) Taylor Averill	5 March 1992	2.01 m (6 ft 7 in)	middle blocker
20	(Germany) Linus Weber	1 November 1999	2.01 m (6 ft 7 in)	opposite
22	(Poland) Karol Borkowski	14 February 1998	1.95 m (6 ft 5 in)	outside hitter
Head coach:		(Poland) Piotr Graban		

PSG Stal Nysa
No.	Name	Date of birth	Height	Position
1	(Morocco) Zouheir El Graoui	1 July 1994	1.97 m (6 ft 6 in)	outside hitter
2	(Poland) Maciej Muzaj	21 May 1994	2.07 m (6 ft 9 in)	opposite
6	(Poland) Konrad Jankowski	29 June 2002	2.04 m (6 ft 8 in)	middle blocker
8	(Poland) Dominik Kramczyński	13 January 2001	2.02 m (6 ft 8 in)	middle blocker
9	(Poland) Michał Gierżot	4 October 2001	2.03 m (6 ft 8 in)	outside hitter
10	(Poland) Remigiusz Kapica	28 September 2000	1.99 m (6 ft 6 in)	opposite
11	(Croatia) Tsimafei Zhukouski	18 December 1989	1.96 m (6 ft 5 in)	setter
12	(Argentina) Nicolás Zerba	13 June 1999	2.04 m (6 ft 8 in)	middle blocker
14	(Poland) Jakub Abramowicz	10 April 1998	2.02 m (6 ft 8 in)	middle blocker
16	(Poland) Kamil Dembiec	7 February 1992	1.78 m (5 ft 10 in)	libero
20	(Poland) Kamil Szymura	24 January 1999	1.85 m (6 ft 1 in)	libero
66	(Poland) Kamil Kosiba	22 February 1999	2.00 m (6 ft 7 in)	outside hitter
90	(Poland) Wojciech Włodarczyk	28 October 1990	2.00 m (6 ft 7 in)	outside hitter
91	(Poland) Patryk Szczurek	6 February 1991	1.93 m (6 ft 4 in)	setter
Head coach:		(Poland) Daniel Pliński		

Ślepsk Malow Suwałki
No.	Name	Date of birth	Height	Position
1	(Argentina) Matías Sánchez	20 September 1996	1.73 m (5 ft 8 in)	setter
2	(Poland) Konrad Stajer	30 May 1994	1.98 m (6 ft 6 in)	middle blocker
4	(Argentina) Joaquín Gallego	21 November 1996	2.04 m (6 ft 8 in)	middle blocker
5	(Poland) Arkadiusz Żakieta	13 October 1992	1.97 m (6 ft 6 in)	opposite
9	(Poland) Bartosz Filipiak	27 February 1994	1.97 m (6 ft 6 in)	opposite
12	(Poland) Łukasz Rudzewicz	25 January 1985	1.98 m (6 ft 6 in)	middle blocker
14	(Slovenia) Žiga Štern	2 January 1994	1.93 m (6 ft 4 in)	outside hitter
15	(Poland) Paweł Halaba	14 December 1995	1.94 m (6 ft 4 in)	outside hitter
16	(Poland) Paweł Filipowicz	7 May 1992	1.89 m (6 ft 2 in)	libero
17	(Poland) Bartosz Firszt	19 March 1999	1.98 m (6 ft 6 in)	outside hitter
24	(Poland) Mateusz Czunkiewicz	16 December 1996	1.83 m (6 ft 0 in)	libero
25	(Poland) Ernest Kaciczak	25 January 2000	2.03 m (6 ft 8 in)	outside hitter
91	(Serbia) Maksim Buculjević	20 September 1991	1.92 m (6 ft 4 in)	setter
95	(Poland) Jakub Macyra	22 July 1995	2.02 m (6 ft 8 in)	middle blocker
Head coach:		(Poland) Dominik Kwapisiewicz		

Trefl Gdańsk
No.	Name	Date of birth	Height	Position
1	(Poland) Janusz Gałązka	26 April 1987	1.99 m (6 ft 6 in)	middle blocker
3	(Argentina) Jan Martínez Franchi	28 January 1998	1.90 m (6 ft 3 in)	outside hitter
5	(Poland) Patryk Niemiec	18 February 1997	2.02 m (6 ft 8 in)	middle blocker
6	(Poland) Jakub Czerwiński	22 July 2001	1.95 m (6 ft 5 in)	outside hitter
7	(Poland) Dawid Pruszkowski	20 January 2001	1.75 m (5 ft 9 in)	libero
8	(Finland) Voitto Köykkä	9 July 1999	1.79 m (5 ft 10 in)	libero
9	(Poland) Aliaksei Nasevich	5 June 2003	1.97 m (6 ft 6 in)	opposite
10	(Poland) Kamil Droszyński	28 January 1997	1.90 m (6 ft 3 in)	setter
11	(Germany) Lukas Kampa	29 November 1986	1.93 m (6 ft 4 in)	setter
12	(Poland) Karol Urbanowicz	24 February 2001	2.00 m (6 ft 7 in)	middle blocker
14	(Poland) Dawid Pawlun	22 May 2001	1.98 m (6 ft 6 in)	setter
15	(Poland) Mikołaj Sawicki	23 November 1999	1.98 m (6 ft 6 in)	outside hitter
17	(Poland) Piotr Orczyk	19 March 1993	1.98 m (6 ft 6 in)	outside hitter
23	(Poland) Jordan Zaleszczyk	23 April 2002	2.03 m (6 ft 8 in)	middle blocker
35	(Poland) Kewin Sasak	20 February 1997	2.08 m (6 ft 10 in)	opposite
Head coach:		(Croatia) Igor Juričić		

ZAKSA Kędzierzyn-Koźle
No.	Name	Date of birth	Height	Position
2	(Poland) Łukasz Kaczmarek	29 June 1994	2.04 m (6 ft 8 in)	opposite
4	(Poland) Przemysław Stępień	7 February 1994	1.85 m (6 ft 1 in)	setter
5	(Poland) Marcin Janusz	31 July 1994	1.95 m (6 ft 5 in)	setter
7	(Netherlands) Twan Wiltenburg	20 January 1997	2.04 m (6 ft 8 in)	middle blocker
9	(Poland) Bartłomiej Kluth	20 December 1992	2.10 m (6 ft 11 in)	opposite
10	(Poland) Bartosz Bednorz	25 July 1994	2.01 m (6 ft 7 in)	outside hitter
11	(Poland) Aleksander Śliwka	24 May 1995	1.97 m (6 ft 6 in)	outside hitter
12	(Norway) Andreas Takvam	4 June 1993	2.01 m (6 ft 7 in)	middle blocker
15	(United States) David Smith	15 May 1985	2.01 m (6 ft 7 in)	middle blocker
16	(Poland) Radosław Gil	25 January 1997	1.91 m (6 ft 3 in)	setter
19	(Ukraine) Dmytro Pashytskyy	29 November 1987	2.05 m (6 ft 9 in)	middle blocker
21	(Poland) Wojciech Żaliński	8 January 1988	1.96 m (6 ft 5 in)	outside hitter
22	(United States) Erik Shoji	24 August 1989	1.83 m (6 ft 0 in)	libero
23	(Poland) Jakub Szymański	25 March 1998	2.00 m (6 ft 7 in)	outside hitter
30	(Poland) Mateusz Biernat	19 May 1992	1.95 m (6 ft 5 in)	setter
71	(Poland) Korneliusz Banach	25 January 1994	1.84 m (6 ft 0 in)	libero
99	(Romania) Daniel Chiţigoi	10 March 2005	2.03 m (6 ft 8 in)	outside hitter
Head coach:		(Finland) Tuomas Sammelvuo → (Poland) Adam Swaczyna		

== See also ==
- 2023–24 CEV Champions League
- 2023–24 CEV Cup
- 2023–24 CEV Challenge Cup
