= 2019–20 PlusLiga =

- League: PlusLiga
- Sport: Volleyball
- Duration: 26 October 2019 – 11 March 2020
- Number of teams: 14
- TV partner(s): Polsat Sport
- League champions: No title awarded

Seasons
- ← 2018–19 2020–21 →

The 2019–20 PlusLiga was the 84th season of the Polish Volleyball Championship, the 20th season as a professional league organized by the Polish Volleyball League SA (Polish: Polska Liga Siatkówki SA) under the supervision of the Polish Volleyball Federation (Polish: Polski Związek Piłki Siatkowej).

The season has been cancelled due to the 2020 coronavirus outbreak.

== Regular season ==
Ranking system:

1. Points
2. Number of victories
3. Set ratio
4. Setpoint ratio
5. H2H results

Result	Winners	Losers
3–0	3 points	0 points
3–1	3 points	0 points
3–2	2 points	1 point

Pos	Team	Pld	W	L	Pts	SW	SL	SR	SPW	SPL	SPR	Qualification or relegation
1	ZAKSA Kędzierzyn-Koźle	24	20	4	61	67	23	2.913	2155	1944	1.109	Quarterfinals
2	Projekt Warsaw	24	21	3	59	65	24	2.708	2092	1917	1.091	Quarterfinals
3	PGE Skra Bełchatów	24	17	7	50	58	32	1.813	2108	1950	1.081	Quarterfinals
4	Jastrzębski Węgiel	24	17	7	48	54	34	1.588	2067	1882	1.098	Quarterfinals
5	Trefl Gdańsk	25	13	12	41	52	44	1.182	2183	2138	1.021	Quarterfinals
6	GKS Katowice	24	11	13	35	50	54	0.926	2298	2280	1.008	Quarterfinals
7	Cerrad Enea Czarni Radom	23	10	13	32	44	48	0.917	2055	2096	0.980	Quarterfinals
8	Indykpol AZS Olsztyn	24	11	13	31	46	51	0.902	2157	2181	0.989	Quarterfinals
9	Ślepsk Malow Suwałki	24	11	13	31	41	52	0.788	2118	2135	0.992	
10	Aluron Virtu CMC Zawiercie	24	9	15	27	36	54	0.667	1993	2067	0.964	
11	MKS Będzin	24	9	15	26	40	56	0.714	2125	2199	0.966	
12	Cuprum Lubin	24	9	15	25	36	55	0.655	1935	2073	0.933	
13	Asseco Resovia	24	7	17	23	35	59	0.593	1974	2133	0.925	
14	BKS Visła Bydgoszcz	24	3	21	15	29	67	0.433	1960	2225	0.881	Relegation

Source: PlusLiga

=== 1st round ===
Date	Time		Score		Set 1	Set 2	Set 3	Set 4	Set 5	Total	Report
6 Nov	17:30	ZAKSA Kędzierzyn-Koźle	3–1	Ślepsk Malow Suwałki	21–25	25–20	25–20	27–25		98–90	
26 Oct	19:00	Projekt Warsaw	3–1	MKS Będzin	25–20	18–25	25–22	25–22		93–89	
26 Oct	20:30	BKS Visła Bydgoszcz	0–3	Jastrzębski Węgiel	22–25	17–25	20–25			59–75	
26 Oct	17:30	Cuprum Lubin	2–3	Aluron Virtu CMC Zawiercie	25–21	23–25	20–25	25–23	13–15	106–109	
26 Oct	14:45	Indykpol AZS Olsztyn	3–2	Cerrad Enea Czarni Radom	22–25	25–17	25–15	15–25	15–13	102–95	
27 Oct	17:30	Trefl Gdańsk	1–3	PGE Skra Bełchatów	19–25	25–22	24–26	17–25		85–98	
27 Oct	14:45	GKS Katowice	3–2	Asseco Resovia	20–25	25–21	21–25	25–22	15–10	106–103	

=== 2nd round ===
Date	Time		Score		Set 1	Set 2	Set 3	Set 4	Set 5	Total	Report
30 Oct	17:30	Asseco Resovia	1–3	Ślepsk Malow Suwałki	25–23	17–25	16–25	22–25		80–98	
30 Oct	18:00	PGE Skra Bełchatów	3–2	GKS Katowice	19–25	26–24	22–25	25–19	16–14	108–107	
30 Oct	18:30	Trefl Gdańsk	3–1	Cerrad Enea Czarni Radom	25–13	21–25	25–19	25–21		96–78	
30 Oct	20:30	Aluron Virtu CMC Zawiercie	3–1	Indykpol AZS Olsztyn	25–16	24–26	25–21	25–23		99–86	
30 Oct	18:00	Jastrzębski Węgiel	3–0	Cuprum Lubin	25–20	25–23	25–7			75–50	
30 Oct	18:00	BKS Visła Bydgoszcz	0–3	Projekt Warsaw	21–25	23–25	13–25			57–75	
30 Oct	18:30	ZAKSA Kędzierzyn-Koźle	3–0	MKS Będzin	27–25	25–21	28–26			80–72	

=== 3rd round ===
Date	Time		Score		Set 1	Set 2	Set 3	Set 4	Set 5	Total	Report
4 Nov	17:30	Projekt Warsaw	3–1	Ślepsk Malow Suwałki	25–19	26–24	20–25	25–23		96–91	
3 Nov	14:45	Jastrzębski Węgiel	0–3	ZAKSA Kędzierzyn-Koźle	23–25	21–25	20–25			64–75	
3 Nov	17:30	Aluron Virtu CMC Zawiercie	3–1	MKS Będzin	20–25	25–19	25–23	25–19		95–86	
4 Nov	20:30	Cerrad Enea Czarni Radom	3–2	BKS Visła Bydgoszcz	21–25	25–17	23–25	25–19	17–15	111–101	
2 Nov	17:30	PGE Skra Bełchatów	2–3	Cuprum Lubin	14–25	25–16	20–25	25–23	12–15	96–104	
2 Nov	14:45	Asseco Resovia	1–3	Indykpol AZS Olsztyn	20–25	20–25	25–21	19–25		84–96	
2 Nov	20:30	GKS Katowice	2–3	Trefl Gdańsk	23–25	25–21	25–27	25–15	11–15	109–103	

=== 4th round ===
Date	Time		Score		Set 1	Set 2	Set 3	Set 4	Set 5	Total	Report
17 Dec	17:30	Ślepsk Malow Suwałki	3–2	Trefl Gdańsk	18–25	22–25	25–16	25–21	16–14	106–101	
8 Nov	20:30	Indykpol AZS Olsztyn	3–2	GKS Katowice	25–20	25–22	18–25	20–25	15–9	103–101	
9 Nov	20:30	Cuprum Lubin	1–3	Asseco Resovia	25–19	18–25	15–25	21–25		79–94	
10 Nov	20:30	BKS Visła Bydgoszcz	0–3	PGE Skra Bełchatów	19–25	15–25	27–29			61–79	
10 Nov	17:30	Cerrad Enea Czarni Radom	3–0	MKS Będzin	25–22	25–21	25–22			75–65	
9 Nov	14:45	ZAKSA Kędzierzyn-Koźle	3–1	Aluron Virtu CMC Zawiercie	23–25	25–22	27–25	25–23		100–95	
9 Nov	17:30	Jastrzębski Węgiel	0–3	Projekt Warsaw	21–25	15–25	20–25			56–75	

=== 5th round ===
Date	Time		Score		Set 1	Set 2	Set 3	Set 4	Set 5	Total	Report
15 Nov	20:30	Jastrzębski Węgiel	3–0	Ślepsk Malow Suwałki	25–21	25–22	25–22			75–65	
16 Nov	14:45	Aluron Virtu CMC Zawiercie	2–3	Projekt Warsaw	20–25	25–19	20–25	25–15	16–18	106–102	
17 Nov	17:30	Cerrad Enea Czarni Radom	0–3	ZAKSA Kędzierzyn-Koźle	24–26	25–27	22–25			71–78	
16 Nov	20:30	PGE Skra Bełchatów	3–1	MKS Będzin	25–21	25–21	23–25	25–23		98–90	
6 Nov	20:30	Asseco Resovia	3–0	BKS Visła Bydgoszcz	25–21	25–18	25–22			75–61	
16 Nov	17:30	GKS Katowice	2–3	Cuprum Lubin	25–20	22–25	21–25	25–23	10–15	103–108	
17 Nov	14:45	Trefl Gdańsk	1–3	Indykpol AZS Olsztyn	27–29	26–24	26–28	17–25		96–106	

=== 6th round ===
Date	Time		Score		Set 1	Set 2	Set 3	Set 4	Set 5	Total	Report
23 Nov	14:45	Ślepsk Malow Suwałki	3–1	Indykpol AZS Olsztyn	25–20	25–19	23–25	27–25		100–89	
24 Nov	17:30	Cuprum Lubin	0–3	Trefl Gdańsk	27–29	19–25	19–25			65–79	
23 Nov	17:30	BKS Visła Bydgoszcz	2–3	GKS Katowice	25–22	25–18	22–25	18–25	12–15	102–105	
12 Dec	20:30	MKS Będzin	2–3	Asseco Resovia	25–17	17–25	19–25	25–20	13–15	99–102	
24 Nov	14:45	ZAKSA Kędzierzyn-Koźle	3–0	PGE Skra Bełchatów	25–22	25–22	25–18			75–62	
24 Nov	20:30	Projekt Warsaw	3–0	Cerrad Enea Czarni Radom	25–22	25–20	25–22			75–64	
22 Nov	20:30	Jastrzębski Węgiel	3–0	Aluron Virtu CMC Zawiercie	25–15	26–24	25–13			76–52	

=== 7th round ===
Date	Time		Score		Set 1	Set 2	Set 3	Set 4	Set 5	Total	Report
26 Nov	17:30	Aluron Virtu CMC Zawiercie	3–0	Ślepsk Malow Suwałki	25–22	25–22	25–23			75–67	
27 Nov	18:00	Cerrad Enea Czarni Radom	1–3	Jastrzębski Węgiel	19–25	27–25	18–25	23–25		87–100	
27 Nov	20:30	PGE Skra Bełchatów	3–1	Projekt Warsaw	25–23	21–25	25–22	25–20		96–90	
27 Nov	17:30	Asseco Resovia	2–3	ZAKSA Kędzierzyn-Koźle	26–28	23–25	25–23	25–23	11–15	110–114	
27 Nov	18:00	GKS Katowice	3–1	MKS Będzin	25–21	23–25	25–22	27–25		100–93	
27 Nov	19:00	Trefl Gdańsk	3–2	BKS Visła Bydgoszcz	25–20	27–29	25–18	17–25	15–13	109–105	
27 Nov	18:00	Indykpol AZS Olsztyn	3–1	Cuprum Lubin	29–31	25–16	25–20	25–15		104–82	

=== 8th round ===
Date	Time		Score		Set 1	Set 2	Set 3	Set 4	Set 5	Total	Report
30 Nov	20:30	Ślepsk Malow Suwałki	0–3	Cuprum Lubin	12–25	21–25	22–25			55–75	
2 Dec	17:30	BKS Visła Bydgoszcz	2–3	Indykpol AZS Olsztyn	25–22	18–25	20–25	27–25	8–15	98–112	
2 Dec	20:30	MKS Będzin	1–3	Trefl Gdańsk	28–30	25–22	23–25	27–29		103–106	
30 Nov	17:30	ZAKSA Kędzierzyn-Koźle	3–1	GKS Katowice	25–22	24–26	25–18	25–17		99–83	
1 Dec	20:00	Projekt Warsaw	3–1	Asseco Resovia	20–25	25–22	25–15	25–18		95–80	
30 Nov	14:45	Jastrzębski Węgiel	3–2	PGE Skra Bełchatów	25–22	20–25	17–25	32–30	15–13	109–115	
1 Dec	14:45	Aluron Virtu CMC Zawiercie	1–3	Cerrad Enea Czarni Radom	23–25	19–25	25–21	17–25		84–96	

=== 9th round ===
Date	Time		Score		Set 1	Set 2	Set 3	Set 4	Set 5	Total	Report
7 Dec	20:30	Cerrad Enea Czarni Radom	2–3	Ślepsk Malow Suwałki	18–25	25–20	25–23	18–25	7–15	93–108	
8 Dec	14:45	PGE Skra Bełchatów	3–0	Aluron Virtu CMC Zawiercie	25–21	25–17	25–20			75–58	
6 Dec	20:30	Asseco Resovia	0–3	Jastrzębski Węgiel	12–25	20–25	15–25			47–75	
7 Dec	14:45	GKS Katowice	2–3	Projekt Warsaw	23–25	25–21	28–26	23–25	14–16	113–113	
8 Dec	12:30	Trefl Gdańsk	1–3	ZAKSA Kędzierzyn-Koźle	23–25	25–19	34–36	17–25		99–105	
7 Dec	17:30	Indykpol AZS Olsztyn	2–3	MKS Będzin	25–23	22–25	25–15	21–25	13–15	106–103	
6 Dec	17:30	Cuprum Lubin	3–0	BKS Visła Bydgoszcz	25–19	25–16	25–20			75–55	

=== 10th round ===
Date	Time		Score		Set 1	Set 2	Set 3	Set 4	Set 5	Total	Report
13 Dec	20:30	Ślepsk Malow Suwałki	3–2	BKS Visła Bydgoszcz	17–25	25–18	25–18	20–25	15–8	102–94	
15 Dec	20:30	MKS Będzin	3–2	Cuprum Lubin	23–25	25–23	23–25	25–19	15–13	111–105	
14 Dec	17:30	ZAKSA Kędzierzyn-Koźle	3–1	Indykpol AZS Olsztyn	25–21	25–14	23–25	25–14		98–74	
14 Dec	20:30	Projekt Warsaw	3–0	Trefl Gdańsk	25–23	25–23	27–25			77–71	
14 Dec	14:45	Jastrzębski Węgiel	3–2	GKS Katowice	20–25	21–25	25–20	25–20	15–10	106–100	
15 Dec	14:45	Asseco Resovia	3–1	Aluron Virtu CMC Zawiercie	25–20	20–25	25–19	27–25		97–89	
15 Dec	17:30	Cerrad Enea Czarni Radom	1–3	PGE Skra Bełchatów	19–25	25–18	31–33	22–25		97–101	

=== 11th round ===
Date	Time		Score		Set 1	Set 2	Set 3	Set 4	Set 5	Total	Report
22 Dec	17:30	PGE Skra Bełchatów	3–1	Ślepsk Malow Suwałki	26–28	29–27	25–23	25–20		105–98	
20 Dec	17:30	Asseco Resovia	3–1	Cerrad Enea Czarni Radom	21–25	25–20	25–21	25–17		96–83	
21 Dec	14:00	GKS Katowice	3–1	Aluron Virtu CMC Zawiercie	25–20	25–18	23–25	25–18		98–81	
22 Dec	14:45	Trefl Gdańsk	1–3	Jastrzębski Węgiel	18–25	14–25	25–23	19–25		76–98	
21 Dec	20:30	Indykpol AZS Olsztyn	1–3	Projekt Warsaw	21–25	17–25	25–21	21–25		84–96	
21 Dec	17:30	Cuprum Lubin	0–3	ZAKSA Kędzierzyn-Koźle	19–25	17–25	21–25			57–75	
20 Dec	20:30	BKS Visła Bydgoszcz	2–3	MKS Będzin	26–24	19–25	20–25	25–21	13–15	103–110	

=== 12th round ===
Date	Time		Score		Set 1	Set 2	Set 3	Set 4	Set 5	Total	Report
26 Dec	14:45	Ślepsk Malow Suwałki	3–1	MKS Będzin	25–22	21–25	26–24	26–24		98–95	
12 Jan	20:30	ZAKSA Kędzierzyn-Koźle	3–0	BKS Visła Bydgoszcz	25–21	25–20	25–20			75–61	
23 Dec	20:30	Projekt Warsaw	3–0	Cuprum Lubin	25–13	25–22	25–23			75–58	
12 Nov	17:30	Jastrzębski Węgiel	0–3	Indykpol AZS Olsztyn	21–25	24–26	29–31			74–82	
4 Dec	18:00	Aluron Virtu CMC Zawiercie	0–3	Trefl Gdańsk	19–25	24–26	24–26			67–77	
20 Nov	18:00	Cerrad Enea Czarni Radom	3–1	GKS Katowice	25–22	25–23	22–25	25–18		97–88	
20 Nov	17:30	PGE Skra Bełchatów	3–0	Asseco Resovia	25–19	25–23	25–21			75–63	

=== 13th round ===
Date	Time		Score		Set 1	Set 2	Set 3	Set 4	Set 5	Total	Report
4 Jan	14:45	Ślepsk Malow Suwałki	2–3	GKS Katowice	25–21	19–25	20–25	25–21	12–15	101–107	
13 Nov	20:30	Trefl Gdańsk	3–0	Asseco Resovia	25–14	25–22	25–19			75–55	
18 Dec	20:30	Indykpol AZS Olsztyn	0–3	PGE Skra Bełchatów	18–25	22–25	20–25			60–75	
13 Nov	17:30	Cuprum Lubin	1–3	Cerrad Enea Czarni Radom	25–22	28–30	22–25	21–25		96–102	
13 Nov	18:30	BKS Visła Bydgoszcz	1–3	Aluron Virtu CMC Zawiercie	25–23	22–25	19–25	22–25		88–98	
6 Nov	18:00	MKS Będzin	0–3	Jastrzębski Węgiel	21–25	19–25	23–25			63–75	
20 Nov	20:30	ZAKSA Kędzierzyn-Koźle	3–2	Projekt Warsaw	25–22	22–25	25–20	18–25	11–15	101–107	

=== 14th round ===
Date	Time		Score		Set 1	Set 2	Set 3	Set 4	Set 5	Total	Report
5 Feb	17:30	Ślepsk Malow Suwałki	0–3	ZAKSA Kędzierzyn-Koźle	31–33	18–25	19–25			68–83	
5 Feb	20:30	MKS Będzin	0–3	Projekt Warsaw	20–25	27–29	15–25			62–79	
19 Nov	17:30	Jastrzębski Węgiel	3–2	BKS Visła Bydgoszcz	25–21	25–27	25–23	24–26	15–11	114–108	
20 Nov	18:00	Aluron Virtu CMC Zawiercie	3–0	Cuprum Lubin	25–17	25–20	25–19			75–56	
11 Mar	17:30	Cerrad Enea Czarni Radom	1–3	Indykpol AZS Olsztyn	24–26	25–20	20–25	23–25		92–96	
4 Feb	20:30	PGE Skra Bełchatów	3–0	Trefl Gdańsk	27–25	25–22	25–21			77–68	
29 Jan	20:30	Asseco Resovia	1–3	GKS Katowice	25–22	20–25	20–25	19–25		84–97	

=== 15th round ===
Date	Time		Score		Set 1	Set 2	Set 3	Set 4	Set 5	Total	Report
17 Jan	17:30	Ślepsk Malow Suwałki	3–1	Asseco Resovia	25–19	25–21	20–25	25–21		95–86	
19 Jan	17:30	GKS Katowice	0–3	PGE Skra Bełchatów	18–25	17–25	17–25			52–75	
19 Jan	14:45	Cerrad Enea Czarni Radom	3–2	Trefl Gdańsk	25–22	21–25	22–25	25–21	15–12	108–105	
17 Jan	20:30	Indykpol AZS Olsztyn	1–3	Aluron Virtu CMC Zawiercie	25–23	23–25	21–25	21–25		90–98	
5 Feb	18:00	Cuprum Lubin	1–3	Jastrzębski Węgiel	28–26	18–25	17–25	11–25		74–101	
18 Jan	20:30	Projekt Warsaw	3–0	BKS Visła Bydgoszcz	25–16	25–20	25–23			75–59	
18 Jan	17:30	MKS Będzin	3–1	ZAKSA Kędzierzyn-Koźle	25–17	25–23	28–30	25–19		103–89	

=== 16th round ===
Date	Time		Score		Set 1	Set 2	Set 3	Set 4	Set 5	Total	Report
21 Jan	20:30	Ślepsk Malow Suwałki	0–3	Projekt Warsaw	22–25	21–25	23–25			66–75	
22 Jan	20:30	ZAKSA Kędzierzyn-Koźle	2–3	Jastrzębski Węgiel	22–25	25–22	28–26	18–25	10–15	103–113	
22 Jan	18:30	MKS Będzin	3–0	Aluron Virtu CMC Zawiercie	25–20	27–25	31–29			83–74	
22 Jan	18:00	BKS Visła Bydgoszcz	3–2	Cerrad Enea Czarni Radom	25–20	21–25	25–23	22–25	15–9	108–102	
22 Jan	18:00	Cuprum Lubin	0–3	PGE Skra Bełchatów	22–25	20–25	19–25			61–75	
22 Jan	17:30	Indykpol AZS Olsztyn	1–3	Asseco Resovia	16–25	25–19	23–25	21–25		85–94	
22 Jan	18:30	Trefl Gdańsk	2–3	GKS Katowice	24–26	21–25	25–22	25–19	19–21	114–113	

=== 17th round ===
Date	Time		Score		Set 1	Set 2	Set 3	Set 4	Set 5	Total	Report
4 Mar	20:30	Trefl Gdańsk	0–3	Ślepsk Malow Suwałki	15–25	20–25	14–25			49–75	
25 Jan	20:30	GKS Katowice	3–2	Indykpol AZS Olsztyn	22–25	28–26	25–17	23–25	15–12	113–105	
26 Jan	20:30	Asseco Resovia	0–3	Cuprum Lubin	20–25	20–25	14–25			54–75	
25 Jan	17:30	PGE Skra Bełchatów	3–0	BKS Visła Bydgoszcz	25–23	25–16	25–23			75–62	
27 Jan	17:30	MKS Będzin	3–1	Cerrad Enea Czarni Radom	26–24	25–15	19–25	25–21		95–85	
25 Jan	14:45	Aluron Virtu CMC Zawiercie	0–3	ZAKSA Kędzierzyn-Koźle	20–25	20–25	20–25			60–75	
26 Jan	14:45	Projekt Warsaw	3–0	Jastrzębski Węgiel	25–21	26–24	25–22			76–67	

=== 18th round ===
Date	Time		Score		Set 1	Set 2	Set 3	Set 4	Set 5	Total	Report
1 Feb	17:30	Ślepsk Malow Suwałki	1–3	Jastrzębski Węgiel	16–25	25–20	17–25	18–25		76–95	
2 Feb	17:30	Projekt Warsaw	3–0	Aluron Virtu CMC Zawiercie	25–20	25–21	25–19			75–60	
1 Feb	14:45	ZAKSA Kędzierzyn-Koźle	3–0	Cerrad Enea Czarni Radom	25–19	25–21	25–21			75–61	
31 Jan	20:30	MKS Będzin	0–3	PGE Skra Bełchatów	17–25	20–25	18–25			55–75	
3 Feb	20:30	BKS Visła Bydgoszcz	3–2	Asseco Resovia	26–24	18–25	22–25	25–19	15–12	106–105	
1 Feb	20:30	Cuprum Lubin	3–1	GKS Katowice	25–23	25–22	16–25	25–19		91–89	
31 Jan	17:30	Indykpol AZS Olsztyn	0–3	Trefl Gdańsk	19–25	18–25	20–25			57–75	

=== 19th round ===
Date	Time		Score		Set 1	Set 2	Set 3	Set 4	Set 5	Total	Report
14 Feb	20:30	Indykpol AZS Olsztyn	1–3	Ślepsk Malow Suwałki	32–34	23–25	25–23	17–25		97–107	
14 Feb	17:30	Trefl Gdańsk	3–0	Cuprum Lubin	26–24	25–17	25–16			76–57	
17 Feb	20:30	GKS Katowice	3–1	BKS Visła Bydgoszcz	33–35	25–16	25–15	25–18		108–84	
15 Feb	20:30	Asseco Resovia	2–3	MKS Będzin	23–25	25–18	25–20	20–25	11–15	104–103	
16 Feb	14:45	PGE Skra Bełchatów	3–2	ZAKSA Kędzierzyn-Koźle	25–21	25–17	25–27	21–25	15–10	111–100	
15 Feb	14:45	Cerrad Enea Czarni Radom	3–1	Projekt Warsaw	25–19	22–25	25–21	25–23		97–88	
16 Feb	17:30	Aluron Virtu CMC Zawiercie	3–2	Jastrzębski Węgiel	21–25	19–25	28–26	25–22	15–11	108–109	

=== 20th round ===
Date	Time		Score		Set 1	Set 2	Set 3	Set 4	Set 5	Total	Report
23 Feb	14:45	Ślepsk Malow Suwałki	3–1	Aluron Virtu CMC Zawiercie	17–25	25–22	25–19	25–22		92–88	
22 Feb	20:30	Jastrzębski Węgiel	0–3	Cerrad Enea Czarni Radom	23–25	26–28	19–25			68–78	
22 Feb	14:45	Projekt Warsaw	3–1	PGE Skra Bełchatów	25–22	31–29	18–25	25–14		99–90	
22 Feb	17:30	ZAKSA Kędzierzyn-Koźle	3–0	Asseco Resovia	25–20	25–22	25–19			75–61	
21 Feb	17:30	MKS Będzin	3–0	GKS Katowice	25–17	25–18	25–23			75–58	
23 Feb	20:30	BKS Visła Bydgoszcz	1–3	Trefl Gdańsk	25–21	19–25	15–25	15–25		74–96	
21 Feb	20:30	Cuprum Lubin	0–3	Indykpol AZS Olsztyn	19–25	23–25	23–25			65–75	

=== 21st round ===
Date	Time		Score		Set 1	Set 2	Set 3	Set 4	Set 5	Total	Report
12 Jan	14:45	Cuprum Lubin	3–1	Ślepsk Malow Suwałki	25–21	18–25	25–22	25–19		93–87	
27 Feb	17:30	Indykpol AZS Olsztyn	3–0	BKS Visła Bydgoszcz	25–13	25–14	25–17			75–44	
26 Feb	18:30	Trefl Gdańsk	3–1	MKS Będzin	25–19	21–25	25–16	25–16		96–76	
26 Feb	17:30	GKS Katowice	0–3	ZAKSA Kędzierzyn-Koźle	22–25	20–25	20–25			62–75	
26 Feb	20:30	Asseco Resovia	1–3	Projekt Warsaw	23–25	25–21	20–25	18–25		86–96	
25 Feb	20:30	PGE Skra Bełchatów	0–3	Jastrzębski Węgiel	22–25	23–25	19–25			64–75	
		~~Cerrad Enea Czarni Radom~~	–	~~Aluron Virtu CMC Zawiercie~~							

=== 22nd round ===
Date	Time		Score		Set 1	Set 2	Set 3	Set 4	Set 5	Total	Report
28 Feb	20:30	Ślepsk Malow Suwałki	1–3	Cerrad Enea Czarni Radom	23–25	42–44	25–22	21–25		111–116	
1 Mar	14:45	Aluron Virtu CMC Zawiercie	3–1	PGE Skra Bełchatów	25–21	20–25	25–20	25–14		95–80	
29 Feb	17:30	Jastrzębski Węgiel	3–0	Asseco Resovia	25–18	25–20	25–22			75–60	
29 Feb	20:30	Projekt Warsaw	3–2	GKS Katowice	19–25	17–25	25–21	25–23	15–13	101–107	
29 Feb	14:45	ZAKSA Kędzierzyn-Koźle	3–2	Trefl Gdańsk	25–18	25–15	22–25	22–25	15–12	109–95	
3 Mar	20:30	MKS Będzin	2–3	Indykpol AZS Olsztyn	17–25	25–21	25–20	21–25	11–15	99–106	
1 Mar	20:30	BKS Visła Bydgoszcz	2–3	Cuprum Lubin	29–27	23–25	25–20	20–25	12–15	109–112	

=== 23rd round ===
Date	Time		Score		Set 1	Set 2	Set 3	Set 4	Set 5	Total	Report
7 Mar	17:00	BKS Visła Bydgoszcz	3–0	Ślepsk Malow Suwałki	26–24	25–21	25–23			76–68	
9 Mar	20:30	Cuprum Lubin	3–2	MKS Będzin	28–26	21–25	23–25	25–17	15–8	112–101	
7 Mar	20:30	Indykpol AZS Olsztyn	1–3	ZAKSA Kędzierzyn-Koźle	19–25	23–25	27–25	17–25		86–100	
8 Mar	18:00	Trefl Gdańsk	3–0	Projekt Warsaw	25–23	26–24	25–19			76–66	
8 Mar	20:30	GKS Katowice	3–1	Jastrzębski Węgiel	25–21	29–31	25–23	25–21		104–96	
6 Mar	20:30	Aluron Virtu CMC Zawiercie	2–3	Asseco Resovia	25–21	21–25	22–25	25–17	13–15	106–103	
6 Mar	17:30	PGE Skra Bełchatów	3–2	Cerrad Enea Czarni Radom	23–25	25–17	25–16	21–25	15–9	109–92	

=== 24th round ===
Date	Time		Score		Set 1	Set 2	Set 3	Set 4	Set 5	Total	Report
9 Feb	14:45	Ślepsk Malow Suwałki	3–1	PGE Skra Bełchatów	16–25	25–22	25–21	28–26		94–94	
10 Feb	20:30	Cerrad Enea Czarni Radom	3–0	Asseco Resovia	25–15	25–17	25–19			75–51	
7 Feb	20:30	Aluron Virtu CMC Zawiercie	0–3	GKS Katowice	22–25	22–25	19–25			63–75	
8 Feb	14:45	Jastrzębski Węgiel	3–1	Trefl Gdańsk	21–25	25–19	25–21	25–20		96–85	
9 Feb	20:30	Projekt Warsaw	3–1	Indykpol AZS Olsztyn	25–21	25–17	18–25	25–18		93–81	
8 Feb	17:30	ZAKSA Kędzierzyn-Koźle	3–1	Cuprum Lubin	25–21	23–25	25–12	25–21		98–79	
8 Feb	20:30	MKS Będzin	3–1	BKS Visła Bydgoszcz	25–21	19–25	25–19	25–20		94–85	

=== 25th round ===
Date	Time		Score		Set 1	Set 2	Set 3	Set 4	Set 5	Total	Report
		~~MKS Będzin~~	–	~~Ślepsk Malow Suwałki~~							
		~~BKS Visła Bydgoszcz~~	–	~~ZAKSA Kędzierzyn-Koźle~~							
		~~Cuprum Lubin~~	–	~~Projekt Warsaw~~							
		~~Indykpol AZS Olsztyn~~	–	~~Jastrzębski Węgiel~~							
11 Mar	20:30	Trefl Gdańsk	3–0	Aluron Virtu CMC Zawiercie	25–18	25–20	25–20			75–58	
		~~GKS Katowice~~	–	~~Cerrad Enea Czarni Radom~~							
		~~Asseco Resovia~~	–	~~PGE Skra Bełchatów~~							

=== 26th round ===
Date	Time		Score		Set 1	Set 2	Set 3	Set 4	Set 5	Total	Report
		~~GKS Katowice~~	–	~~Ślepsk Malow Suwałki~~							
		~~Asseco Resovia~~	–	~~Trefl Gdańsk~~							
		~~PGE Skra Bełchatów~~	–	~~Indykpol AZS Olsztyn~~							
		~~Cerrad Enea Czarni Radom~~	–	~~Cuprum Lubin~~							
		~~Aluron Virtu CMC Zawiercie~~	–	~~BKS Visła Bydgoszcz~~							
		~~Jastrzębski Węgiel~~	–	~~MKS Będzin~~							
		~~Projekt Warsaw~~	–	~~ZAKSA Kędzierzyn-Koźle~~							

== Final standings ==
Qualified for the 2020–21 CEV Champions League
Relegation to the 1st league

Rank	Team
1	ZAKSA Kędzierzyn-Koźle
2	Projekt Warsaw
3	PGE Skra Bełchatów
4	Jastrzębski Węgiel
5	Trefl Gdańsk
6	GKS Katowice
7	Cerrad Enea Czarni Radom
8	Indykpol AZS Olsztyn
9	Ślepsk Malow Suwałki
10	Aluron Virtu CMC Zawiercie
11	MKS Będzin
12	Cuprum Lubin
13	Asseco Resovia
14	BKS Visła Bydgoszcz

== Squads ==
Aluron Virtu CMC Zawiercie
No.	Name	Date of birth	Height	Position
1	(Poland) Marcin Waliński	24 October 1990	1.95 m (6 ft 5 in)	outside hitter
2	(Australia) Arshdeep Dosanjh	30 July 1996	2.05 m (6 ft 9 in)	setter
3	(Poland) Łukasz Swodczyk	6 January 1990	1.96 m (6 ft 5 in)	middle blocker
5	(Poland) Piotr Lipiński	4 January 1979	1.95 m (6 ft 5 in)	setter
6	(Poland) Mateusz Malinowski	6 May 1992	1.98 m (6 ft 6 in)	opposite
8	(Portugal) Alexandre Ferreira	13 November 1991	2.00 m (6 ft 7 in)	outside hitter
9	(Poland) Krzysztof Andrzejewski	26 January 1983	1.80 m (5 ft 11 in)	libero
10	(Poland) Bartosz Gawryszewski	22 August 1985	2.02 m (6 ft 8 in)	middle blocker
11	(Poland) Marcin Kania	14 February 1996	2.03 m (6 ft 8 in)	middle blocker
12	(Poland) Grzegorz Bociek	6 June 1991	2.07 m (6 ft 9 in)	opposite
17	(Belgium) Pieter Verhees	8 December 1989	2.05 m (6 ft 9 in)	middle blocker
19	(Japan) Taichirō Koga	4 October 1989	1.70 m (5 ft 7 in)	libero
22	(Bulgaria) Nikolay Penchev	22 May 1992	1.96 m (6 ft 5 in)	outside hitter
55	(Poland) Wojciech Ferens	5 April 1991	1.94 m (6 ft 4 in)	outside hitter
77	(Slovakia) (Poland) Michal Masný	14 August 1979	330 cm (130 in)	setter
99	(Poland) Patryk Czarnowski	1 November 1985	2.04 m (6 ft 8 in)	middle blocker
Head coach:		(Australia) Mark Lebedew		

Asseco Resovia
No.	Name	Date of birth	Height	Position
1	(Poland) Bartłomiej Krulicki	15 September 1993	2.05 m (6 ft 9 in)	middle blocker
2	(Poland) Grzegorz Kosok	2 March 1986	2.05 m (6 ft 9 in)	middle blocker
3	(Poland) Bartłomiej Lemański	19 March 1996	2.16 m (7 ft 1 in)	middle blocker
4	(Australia) Luke Perry	20 November 1995	1.80 m (5 ft 11 in)	libero
5	(Poland) Marcin Komenda	24 May 1996	1.98 m (6 ft 6 in)	setter
6	(Belgium) Tomas Rousseaux	31 March 1994	1.99 m (6 ft 6 in)	outside hitter
7	(United States) Kawika Shoji	11 November 1987	1.90 m (6 ft 3 in)	setter
8	(Canada) Nicholas Hoag	19 August 1992	2.00 m (6 ft 7 in)	outside hitter
9	(Poland) Zbigniew Bartman	4 May 1987	1.98 m (6 ft 6 in)	opposite
12	(Poland) Tomasz Kalembka	30 June 1991	2.05 m (6 ft 9 in)	middle blocker
13	(Poland) Aleh Akhrem	12 March 1983	1.94 m (6 ft 4 in)	outside hitter
14	(Poland) Rafał Buszek	28 April 1987	1.96 m (6 ft 5 in)	outside hitter
16	(France) Nicolas Marechal	4 March 1987	1.98 m (6 ft 6 in)	outside hitter
17	(Poland) Marcin Możdżonek	9 February 1985	2.11 m (6 ft 11 in)	middle blocker
23	(Poland) Bartosz Mariański	26 May 1992	1.87 m (6 ft 2 in)	libero
77	(Poland) Damian Schulz	26 February 1990	2.08 m (6 ft 10 in)	opposite
Head coach:		(Poland) Piotr Gruszka → (Italy) Emanuele Zanini		

BKS Visła Bydgoszcz
No.	Name	Date of birth	Height	Position
1	(Poland) Janusz Gałązka	26 April 1987	1.99 m (6 ft 6 in)	middle blocker
2	(Poland) Dawid Woch	16 May 1997	2.00 m (6 ft 7 in)	middle blocker
4	(Slovenia) Tonček Štern	14 November 1995	1.98 m (6 ft 6 in)	opposite
5	(Poland) Piotr Lipiński	4 January 1979	1.95 m (6 ft 5 in)	setter
7	(Poland) Paweł Gryc	9 January 1996	2.08 m (6 ft 10 in)	outside hitter
8	(Poland) Tomasz Kalembka	30 June 1991	2.05 m (6 ft 9 in)	middle blocker
9	(Argentina) Gonzalo Quiroga	25 February 1993	1.92 m (6 ft 4 in)	outside hitter
10	(Poland) Radosław Gil	25 January 1997	1.91 m (6 ft 3 in)	setter
11	(Poland) Jakub Urbanowicz	14 August 1993	2.03 m (6 ft 8 in)	outside hitter
13	(Poland) Dawid Siwczyk	13 June 1993	1.93 m (6 ft 4 in)	middle blocker
14	(Poland) Jakub Peszko	1 April 1992	1.93 m (6 ft 4 in)	outside hitter
18	(Poland) Tomasz Bonisławski	22 January 1991	1.88 m (6 ft 2 in)	libero
19	(Poland) Paweł Cieślik	18 March 2000	1.97 m (6 ft 6 in)	opposite
20	(Poland) Kamil Szymura	24 January 1999	1.85 m (6 ft 1 in)	libero
77	(Slovakia) (Poland) Michal Masný	14 August 1979	1.82 m (6 ft 0 in)	setter
94	(Poland) Michał Filip	31 August 1994	1.97 m (6 ft 6 in)	opposite
Head coach:		(Poland) Przemysław Michalczyk		

Cerrad Enea Czarni Radom
No.	Name	Date of birth	Height	Position
1	(Slovenia) Alen Pajenk	23 April 1986	2.03 m (6 ft 8 in)	middle blocker
2	(Poland) Michał Ostrowski	29 March 1990	2.03 m (6 ft 8 in)	middle blocker
3	(Poland) Michał Kędzierski	9 August 1994	1.94 m (6 ft 4 in)	setter
4	(Poland) Bartłomiej Grzechnik	8 February 1993	2.00 m (6 ft 7 in)	middle blocker
6	(Poland) Damian Boruch	14 December 1989	2.09 m (6 ft 10 in)	middle blocker
7	(Greece) Athanasios Protopsaltis	12 September 1993	1.85 m (6 ft 1 in)	outside hitter
9	(Slovenia) Dejan Vinčić	15 September 1986	2.02 m (6 ft 8 in)	setter
10	(Poland) Michał Filip	31 August 1994	1.97 m (6 ft 6 in)	opposite
11	(Poland) Michał Ruciak	22 August 1983	1.90 m (6 ft 3 in)	libero
13	(Poland) Mateusz Masłowski	13 June 1997	1.85 m (6 ft 1 in)	libero
15	(United States) Brenden Sander	22 December 1995	1.95 m (6 ft 5 in)	outside hitter
17	(Poland) Bartosz Firszt	19 March 1999	1.98 m (6 ft 6 in)	outside hitter
20	(Poland) Wojciech Włodarczyk	28 October 1990	2.00 m (6 ft 7 in)	outside hitter
21	(Poland) Karol Butryn	18 June 1993	1.94 m (6 ft 4 in)	opposite
27	(Poland) Łukasz Zugaj	27 January 1993	1.92 m (6 ft 4 in)	opposite
Head coach:		(Poland) Robert Prygiel		

Cuprum Lubin
No.	Name	Date of birth	Height	Position
1	(Poland) Bartłomiej Lipiński	16 November 1996	2.01 m (6 ft 7 in)	outside hitter
2	(Poland) Kamil Maruszczyk	13 January 1993	1.91 m (6 ft 3 in)	outside hitter
6	(Poland) Bartłomiej Zawalski	13 February 1999	2.04 m (6 ft 8 in)	middle blocker
7	(Poland) Maciej Gorzkiewicz	16 February 1984	1.92 m (6 ft 4 in)	setter
9	(Poland) Jakub Ziobrowski	23 January 1997	2.02 m (6 ft 8 in)	opposite
10	(Brazil) Robinson Dvoranen	23 December 1983	2.01 m (6 ft 7 in)	outside hitter
11	(Poland) Filip Biegun	21 May 1996	2.00 m (6 ft 7 in)	outside hitter
12	(Poland) Przemysław Smoliński	27 November 1992	2.01 m (6 ft 7 in)	middle blocker
13	(Poland) Jędrzej Gruszczyński	13 November 1997	1.86 m (6 ft 1 in)	libero
15	(Portugal) Miguel Tavares	2 March 1993	1.92 m (76 in)	setter
16	(Poland) Bartosz Makoś	1 August 1998	1.76 m (5 ft 9 in)	libero
17	(Poland) Mateusz Sacharewicz	23 October 1989	1.98 m (6 ft 6 in)	middle blocker
18	(Poland) Damian Domagała	23 April 1998	1.99 m (6 ft 6 in)	opposite
20	(Belarus) Maksim Marozau	29 May 1989	2.06 m (6 ft 9 in)	middle blocker
Head coach:		(Brazil) Marcelo Fronckowiak		

GKS Katowice
No.	Name	Date of birth	Height	Position
1	(Poland) Jan Nowakowski	17 May 1994	2.02 m (6 ft 8 in)	middle blocker
2	(Poland) Jakub Szymański	25 March 1998	2.00 m (6 ft 7 in)	outside hitter
3	(Poland) Wiktor Musiał	30 March 1993	1.94 m (6 ft 4 in)	opposite
5	(Poland) Miłosz Zniszczoł	2 July 1986	2.01 m (6 ft 7 in)	middle blocker
6	(Poland) Jan Firlej	26 September 1996	1.88 m (6 ft 2 in)	setter
7	(Poland) Jakub Jarosz	10 February 1987	1.97 m (6 ft 6 in)	opposite
10	(Poland) Maciej Fijałek	7 August 1982	1.86 m (6 ft 1 in)	setter
11	(Poland) Adrian Buchowski	30 September 1991	1.94 m (6 ft 4 in)	outside hitter
12	(Slovakia) Emanuel Kohút	21 July 1982	2.04 m (6 ft 8 in)	middle blocker
13	(Poland) Rafał Szymura	29 August 1995	1.97 m (6 ft 6 in)	outside hitter
14	(Poland) Kamil Drzazga	11 September 2000	2.10 m (6 ft 11 in)	middle blocker
15	(Poland) Kamil Kwasowski	13 September 1990	1.97 m (6 ft 6 in)	outside hitter
17	(Poland) Szymon Gregorowicz	7 March 1994	1.83 m (6 ft 0 in)	libero
21	(United States) Dustin Watten	27 October 1986	1.83 m (6 ft 0 in)	libero
Head coach:		(Poland) Dariusz Daszkiewicz		

Indykpol AZS Olsztyn
No.	Name	Date of birth	Height	Position
1	(Poland) Tomasz Kowalski	12 June 1991	2.02 m (6 ft 8 in)	setter
2	(Czech Republic) Jan Hadrava	3 June 1991	1.98 m (6 ft 6 in)	opposite
3	(Poland) Michał Żurek	3 June 1988	1.81 m (5 ft 11 in)	libero
6	(Netherlands) Robbert Andringa	28 April 1990	1.91 m (6 ft 3 in)	outside hitter
9	(Poland) Paweł Pietraszko	5 October 1990	2.03 m (6 ft 8 in)	middle blocker
10	(Poland) Remigiusz Kapica	28 September 2000	1.99 m (6 ft 6 in)	opposite
12	(Poland) Paweł Woicki	19 June 1983	1.82 m (6 ft 0 in)	setter
15	(Poland) Mateusz Mika	21 January 1991	2.06 m (6 ft 9 in)	outside hitter
16	(Poland) Mateusz Poręba	24 August 1999	2.04 m (6 ft 8 in)	middle blocker
17	(Poland) Jakub Zabłocki	10 April 1995	1.80 m (5 ft 11 in)	libero
18	(Poland) Dawid Sokołowski	6 October 2000	1.93 m (6 ft 4 in)	outside hitter
21	(Poland) Wojciech Żaliński	8 January 1988	1.96 m (6 ft 5 in)	outside hitter
66	(Iran) Mohammad Mousavi	22 August 1987	2.02 m (6 ft 8 in)	middle blocker
Head coach:		(Italy) Paolo Montagnani → (Argentina) Daniel Castellani		

Jastrzębski Węgiel
No.	Name	Date of birth	Height	Position
1	(Germany) Christian Fromm	15 August 1990	2.04 m (6 ft 8 in)	outside hitter
2	(Brazil) Raphael Margarido	28 April 1983	1.86 m (6 ft 1 in)	setter
3	(Poland) Jakub Popiwczak	17 April 1996	1.80 m (5 ft 11 in)	libero
4	(Puerto Rico) Arturo Iglesias	22 November 1995	1.93 m (6 ft 4 in)	setter
5	(Poland) Jakub Bucki	13 August 1988	1.97 m (6 ft 6 in)	opposite
6	(Poland) Dawid Konarski	31 August 1989	1.98 m (6 ft 6 in)	opposite
7	(Poland) Paweł Rusek	21 January 1983	1.83 m (6 ft 0 in)	libero
8	(France) Julien Lyneel	15 April 1990	1.92 m (6 ft 4 in)	outside hitter
9	(Canada) Graham Vigrass	17 June 1989	2.05 m (6 ft 9 in)	middle blocker
10	(Germany) Lukas Kampa	29 November 1986	1.93 m (6 ft 4 in)	setter
11	(Poland) Dominik Depowski	27 October 1995	2.00 m (6 ft 7 in)	outside hitter
13	(Poland) Yuriy Gladyr	8 July 1984	2.02 m (6 ft 8 in)	middle blocker
15	(Poland) Michał Szalacha	15 January 1994	2.02 m (6 ft 8 in)	middle blocker
16	(Poland) Piotr Hain	26 February 1991	2.07 m (6 ft 9 in)	middle blocker
21	(Poland) Tomasz Fornal	31 August 1997	2.00 m (6 ft 7 in)	outside hitter
Head coach:		(Italy) Roberto Santilli → (Serbia) Slobodan Kovač		

MKS Będzin
No.	Name	Date of birth	Height	Position
1	(Canada) TJ Sanders	14 December 1991	1.91 m (6 ft 3 in)	setter
2	(Poland) Dawid Gunia	1 January 1987	2.03 m (6 ft 8 in)	middle blocker
3	(Poland) Konrad Buczek	17 February 1994	1.90 m (6 ft 3 in)	setter
5	(Poland) Artur Ratajczak	18 September 1990	2.06 m (6 ft 9 in)	middle blocker
6	(Poland) Dawid Dryja	21 July 1992	2.01 m (6 ft 7 in)	middle blocker
7	(Iran) Purya Fayazi	12 January 1993	1.94 m (6 ft 4 in)	outside hitter
9	(Poland) Grzegorz Pająk	1 January 1987	1.96 m (6 ft 5 in)	setter
10	(Poland) Rafał Sobański	10 August 1991	1.95 m (6 ft 5 in)	outside hitter
11	(Poland) Michał Superlak	16 November 1993	2.06 m (6 ft 9 in)	opposite
12	(Poland) Jan Fornal	14 January 1995	1.91 m (6 ft 3 in)	outside hitter
13	(Poland) Michał Potera	6 March 1988	1.83 m (6 ft 0 in)	libero
14	(Poland) Bartosz Schmidt	3 June 1991	2.00 m (6 ft 7 in)	middle blocker
16	(Poland) Rafał Faryna	28 September 1994	2.00 m (6 ft 7 in)	opposite
20	(Poland) Piotr Macheta	12 October 1998	1.80 m (5 ft 11 in)	libero
77	(Germany) David Sossenheimer	21 June 1996	1.93 m (6 ft 4 in)	outside hitter
Head coach:		(Poland) Jakub Bednaruk		

PGE Skra Bełchatów
No.	Name	Date of birth	Height	Position
1	(Poland) Kamil Droszyński	28 January 1997	1.90 m (6 ft 3 in)	setter
2	(Poland) Mariusz Wlazły	4 August 1983	1.94 m (6 ft 4 in)	opposite
6	(Poland) Karol Kłos	8 August 1989	2.01 m (6 ft 7 in)	middle blocker
7	(Poland) Jakub Kochanowski	17 July 1997	1.99 m (6 ft 6 in)	middle blocker
8	(Serbia) Milan Katić	22 October 1993	2.01 m (6 ft 7 in)	outside hitter
11	(Iran) Milad Ebadipour	17 October 1993	1.96 m (6 ft 5 in)	outside hitter
12	(Poland) Artur Szalpuk	20 March 1995	2.01 m (6 ft 7 in)	outside hitter
15	(Poland) Grzegorz Łomacz	1 October 1987	1.88 m (6 ft 2 in)	setter
16	(Poland) Kacper Piechocki	17 February 1995	1.85 m (6 ft 1 in)	libero
17	(Poland) Piotr Orczyk	19 March 1993	1.98 m (6 ft 6 in)	outside hitter
18	(Poland) Robert Milczarek	28 November 1983	1.88 m (6 ft 2 in)	libero
21	(Serbia) Dušan Petković	27 January 1992	2.02 m (6 ft 8 in)	opposite
23	(Poland) Aleksander Antosiewicz	13 February 2001	2.05 m (6 ft 9 in)	middle blocker
99	(Poland) Norbert Huber	14 August 1998	2.07 m (6 ft 9 in)	middle blocker
Head coach:		(Poland) Michał Mieszko Gogol		

Projekt Warsaw
No.	Name	Date of birth	Height	Position
1	(Poland) Jakub Kowalczyk	26 June 1986	2.00 m (6 ft 7 in)	middle blocker
2	(Poland) Bartosz Kwolek	17 July 1997	1.93 m (6 ft 4 in)	outside hitter
4	(Poland) Jan Król	23 August 1989	1.98 m (6 ft 6 in)	opposite
6	(France) Antoine Brizard	22 May 1994	1.95 m (6 ft 5 in)	setter
8	(Poland) Andrzej Wrona	27 December 1988	2.06 m (6 ft 9 in)	middle blocker
9	(Poland) Patryk Niemiec	18 February 1997	2.02 m (6 ft 8 in)	middle blocker
11	(Poland) Piotr Nowakowski	18 December 1987	2.05 m (6 ft 9 in)	middle blocker
12	(Poland) Jan Kopyść	2 December 1999	1.93 m (6 ft 4 in)	outside hitter
13	(Belgium) Igor Grobelny	8 June 1993	1.94 m (6 ft 4 in)	outside hitter
14	(Poland) Dominik Jaglarski	20 June 1997	1.87 m (6 ft 2 in)	libero
18	(Poland) Damian Wojtaszek	7 September 1988	1.80 m (5 ft 11 in)	libero
22	(France) Kevin Tillie	2 November 1990	2.00 m (6 ft 7 in)	outside hitter
23	(Belarus) Artur Udrys	18 October 1990	2.11 m (6 ft 11 in)	opposite
85	(Poland) Michał Kozłowski	16 February 1985	1.91 m (6 ft 3 in)	setter
Head coach:		(Italy) Andrea Anastasi		

Ślepsk Malow Suwałki
No.	Name	Date of birth	Height	Position
2	(Poland) Patryk Szwaradzki	27 June 1995	1.95 m (6 ft 5 in)	opposite
4	(Poland) Wojciech Siek	10 May 1994	2.05 m (6 ft 9 in)	middle blocker
7	(Poland) Kamil Skrzypkowski	30 September 1986	1.93 m (6 ft 4 in)	outside hitter
8	(Belgium) Kévin Klinkenberg	4 October 1990	1.97 m (6 ft 6 in)	outside hitter
9	(France) (Poland) Nicolas Szerszeń	31 December 1996	1.95 m (6 ft 5 in)	outside hitter
10	(Poland) Bartłomiej Bołądź	28 September 1994	2.04 m (6 ft 8 in)	opposite
11	(Norway) Andreas Takvam	4 June 1993	2.01 m (6 ft 7 in)	middle blocker
12	(Poland) Łukasz Rudzewicz	25 January 1985	1.98 m (6 ft 6 in)	middle blocker
13	(Poland) Jakub Rohnka	10 March 1992	1.95 m (6 ft 5 in)	outside hitter
14	(Poland) Cezary Sapiński	28 September 1994	2.03 m (6 ft 8 in)	middle blocker
16	(Poland) Paweł Filipowicz	7 May 1992	1.89 m (6 ft 2 in)	lbero
18	(Poland) Kacper Gonciarz	31 August 1992	1.92 m (6 ft 4 in)	setter
82	(Poland) Adrian Stańczak	17 February 1987	1.85 m (6 ft 1 in)	libero
91	(United States) Joshua Tuaniga	18 March 1997	1.95 m (6 ft 5 in)	setter
Head coach:		(Poland) Andrzej Kowal		

Trefl Gdańsk
No.	Name	Date of birth	Height	Position
1	(Poland) Bartosz Filipiak	27 February 1994	1.97 m (6 ft 6 in)	opposite
4	(Poland) Łukasz Kozub	3 November 1997	1.86 m (6 ft 1 in)	setter
5	(Poland) Marcin Janusz	31 July 1994	1.95 m (6 ft 5 in)	setter
6	(Poland) Szymon Jakubiszak	13 February 1998	2.08 m (6 ft 10 in)	outside hitter
9	(Poland) Kewin Sasak	20 February 1997	2.08 m (6 ft 10 in)	opposite
11	(Poland) Mateusz Janikowski	5 May 1999	2.01 m (6 ft 7 in)	outside hitter
12	(Poland) Karol Urbanowicz	24 February 2001	2.00 m (6 ft 7 in)	middle blocker
13	(Germany) Ruben Schott	8 July 1994	1.92 m (6 ft 4 in)	outside hitter
14	(Poland) Maciej Olenderek	16 October 1992	1.78 m (5 ft 10 in)	libero
15	(Poland) Paweł Halaba	14 December 1995	1.94 m (6 ft 4 in)	outside hitter
16	(Poland) Fabian Majcherski	28 March 1997	1.75 m (5 ft 9 in)	libero
17	(Poland) Bartłomiej Mordyl	21 January 1995	2.01 m (6 ft 7 in)	middle blocker
18	(Argentina) Pablo Crer	12 June 1989	2.05 m (6 ft 9 in)	middle blocker
20	(Poland) Wojciech Grzyb	4 January 1981	2.05 m (6 ft 9 in)	middle blocker
Head coach:		(Poland) Michał Winiarski		

ZAKSA Kędzierzyn-Koźle
No.	Name	Date of birth	Height	Position
1	(Poland) Paweł Zatorski	21 June 1990	1.84 m (6 ft 0 in)	libero
2	(Poland) Łukasz Kaczmarek	29 June 1994	2.04 m (6 ft 8 in)	opposite
3	(Italy) Simone Parodi	16 June 1986	1.96 m (6 ft 5 in)	outside hitter
4	(Poland) Przemysław Stępień	7 February 1994	1.85 m (6 ft 1 in)	setter
6	(France) Benjamin Toniutti	30 October 1989	1.83 m (6 ft 0 in)	setter
7	(Poland) Piotr Łukasik	11 July 1994	2.08 m (6 ft 10 in)	outside hitter
8	(Poland) Sławomir Jungiewicz	21 June 1989	1.96 m (6 ft 5 in)	opposite
9	(Poland) Łukasz Wiśniewski	3 February 1989	1.98 m (6 ft 6 in)	middle blocker
11	(Poland) Aleksander Śliwka	24 May 1995	1.98 m (6 ft 6 in)	outside hitter
12	(Poland) Sebastian Warda	18 January 1989	2.04 m (6 ft 8 in)	middle blocker
13	(Poland) Kamil Semeniuk	16 July 1996	1.94 m (6 ft 4 in)	outside hitter
14	(Hungary) Árpád Baróti	23 October 1991	2.05 m (6 ft 9 in)	opposite
15	(United States) David Smith	15 May 1985	2.01 m (6 ft 7 in)	middle blocker
16	(Poland) Krzysztof Rejno	22 February 1993	2.03 m (6 ft 8 in)	middle blocker
18	(Poland) Adam Smolarczyk	12 May 1994	2.04 m (6 ft 8 in)	outside hitter
19	(Poland) Filip Grygiel	12 February 2000	2.01 m (6 ft 7 in)	opposite
71	(Poland) Korneliusz Banach	25 January 1994	1.84 m (6 ft 0 in)	libero
Head coach:		(Serbia) Nikola Grbić		

== See also ==
- 2019–20 CEV Champions League
- 2019–20 CEV Challenge Cup
