= Andreas Takvam =

Norwegian volleyball player (born 1993)

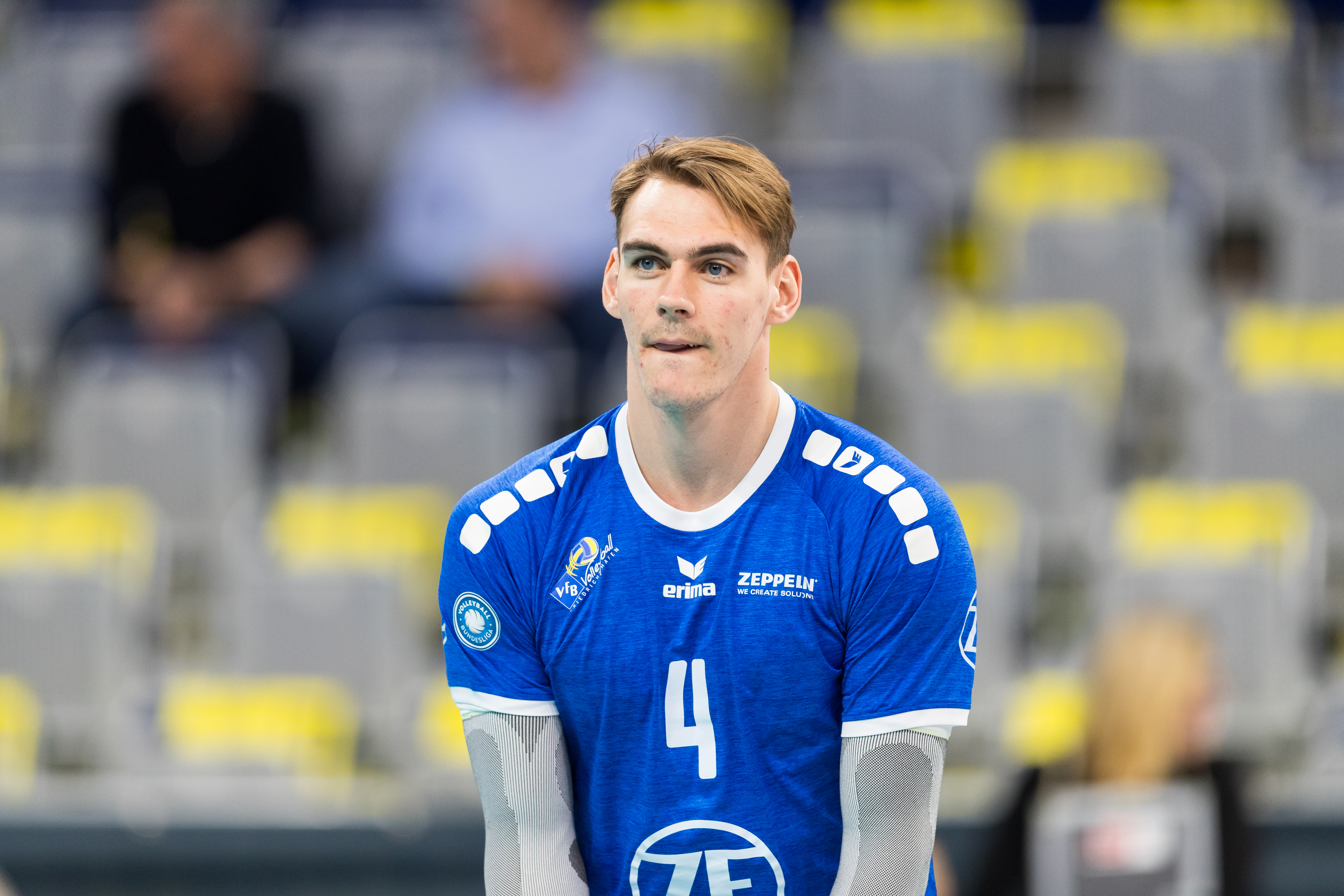
- Takvam in 2019

Personal information
- Born: 4 June 1993 (age 33); Fjell Municipality, Norway
- Height: 2.01 m (6 ft 7 in)
- Weight: 98 kg (216 lb)
- Spike: 364 cm (143 in)

Volleyball information
- Position: Middle blocker
- Current club: ZAKSA Kędzierzyn-Koźle
- Number: 12

Career
Years	Teams
2009–2014; 2014–2016; 2016–2019; 2019–2023; 2023–2025	TIF Viking; Effector Kielce; VfB Friedrichshafen; Ślepsk Suwałki; ZAKSA Kędzierzyn-Koźle

National team
Norway

Andreas Takvam (born 4 June 1993) is a Norwegian professional volleyball player who plays as a middle blocker for ZAKSA Kędzierzyn-Koźle and the Norway national team.

== Honours ==
=== Club ===
- Domestic
  - 2009–10 Norwegian Championship, with Nyborg VBK
  - 2010–11 Norwegian Championship, with Nyborg VBK
  - 2011–12 Norwegian Championship, with Nyborg VBK
  - 2013–14 Norwegian Championship, with Nyborg VBK
  - 2016–17 German SuperCup, with VfB Friedrichshafen
  - 2016–17 German Cup, with VfB Friedrichshafen
  - 2017–18 German SuperCup, with VfB Friedrichshafen
  - 2017–18 German Cup, with VfB Friedrichshafen
  - 2018–19 German SuperCup, with VfB Friedrichshafen
  - 2018–19 German Cup, with VfB Friedrichshafen
  - 2023–24 Polish SuperCup, with ZAKSA Kędzierzyn-Koźle
