= Bartosz Filipiak =

Polish volleyball player (born 1994)

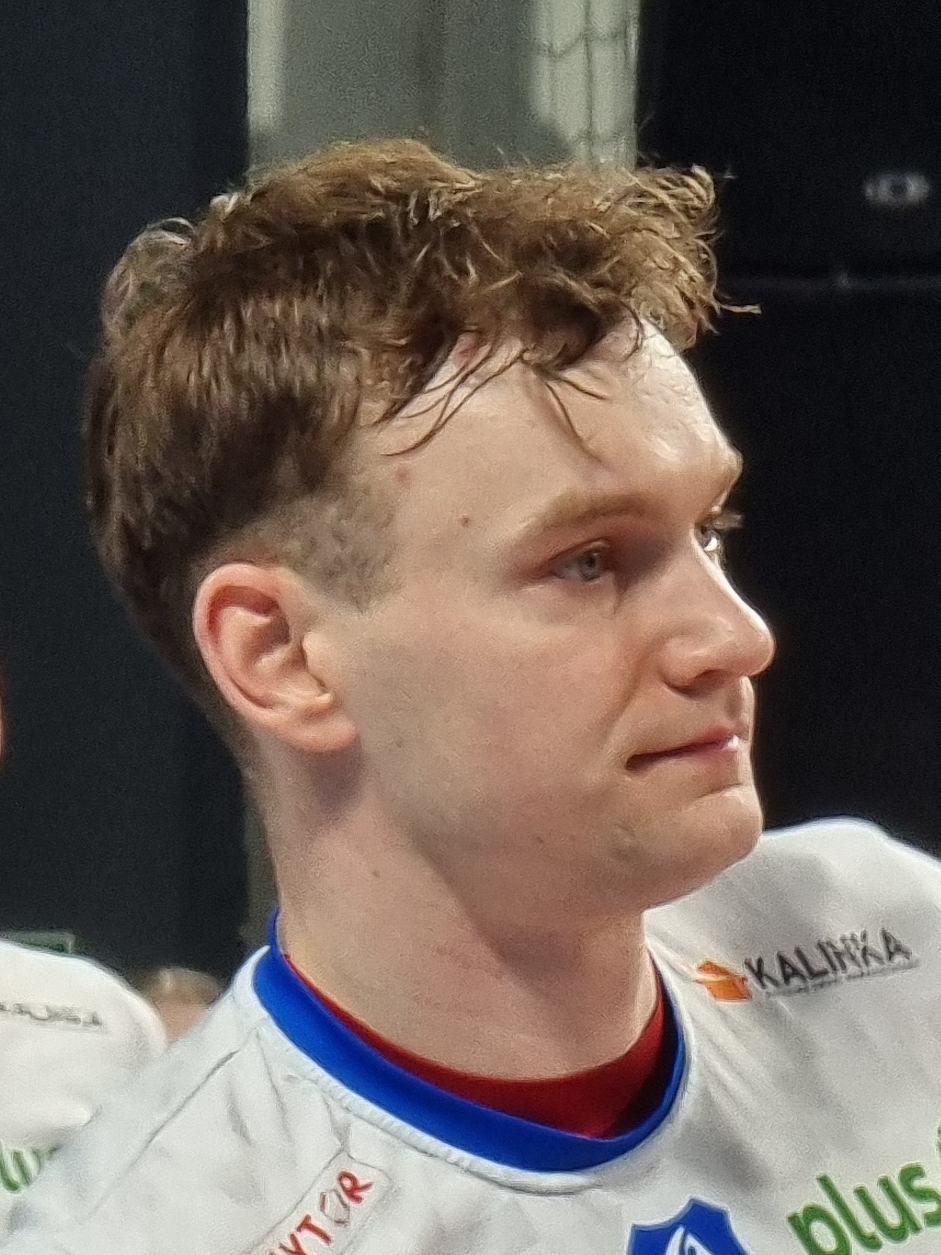

Personal information
- Born: 27 February 1994 (age 32); Aleksandrów Kujawski, Poland
- Height: 1.97 m (6 ft 6 in)
- Weight: 82 kg (181 lb)
- Spike: 355 cm (140 in)

Volleyball information
- Position: Opposite
- Current club: Ślepsk Suwałki
- Number: 9

Career
Years	Teams
2010–2014; 2014–2016; 2016–2019; 2019–2020; 2020–2021; 2021–2022; 2022–	Delecta Bydgoszcz; Victoria Wałbrzych; Łuczniczka Bydgoszcz; Trefl Gdańsk; Skra Bełchatów; LUK Lublin; Ślepsk Suwałki

National team
2019	Poland

Bartosz Filipiak (born 27 February 1994) is a Polish professional volleyball player who plays as an opposite spiker for Ślepsk Malow Suwałki. Filipiak competed for Poland in the 2019 Nations League.

== Honours ==
=== Universiade ===
- 2019 Summer Universiade

=== Statistics ===
- 2019–20 PlusLiga – Best scorer (460 points)
- 2019–20 PlusLiga – Best spiker (382 points)
