= Ślepsk Suwałki =

Polish volleyball club

Ślepsk Malow Suwałki
- Full name: Miejski Klub Sportowy; Ślepsk Suwałki
- Founded: 2004; 22 years ago
- Ground: Suwałki Arena (Capacity: 2,299)
- Chairman: Wojciech Winnik
- Manager: Piotr Graban
- Captain: Bartosz Filipiak
- League: Tauron Liga
- 2025–26: 10th place
- Website: Club home page

Uniforms
Home	Away

MKS Ślepsk Suwałki, officially known for sponsorship reasons as Ślepsk Malow Suwałki, is a professional men's volleyball club based in Suwałki in northeastern Poland. Initially, the club was founded in 2004 in Augustów and moved to Suwałki in 2009. They were promoted to the highest level of the Polish Volleyball League in 2019.

== Team ==
As of 2026–27 season

No.	Name	Date of birth	Position
1	(Poland) Jan Nowakowski	17 May 1994 (age 32)	middle blocker
2	(Spain) Ángel Trinidad	27 March 1993 (age 33)	setter
3	(Poland) Maksymilian Łysoń	30 March 2007 (age 19)	opposite
5	(Poland) Karol Jankiewicz	21 February 1996 (age 30)	setter
7	(Argentina) Ignacio Luengas	28 January 1996 (age 30)	outside hitter
9	(Poland) Bartosz Filipiak	27 February 1994 (age 32)	opposite
10	(Poland) Marcel Hendzelewski	29 February 2004 (age 22)	outside hitter
11	(Poland) Paweł Pietraszko	5 October 1990 (age 36)	middle blocker
14	(Poland) Bartosz Mariański	26 May 1992 (age 34)	libero
15	(Germany) Moritz Reichert	15 March 1995 (age 31)	outside hitter
18	(Poland) Maksymilian Granieczny	7 July 2005 (age 21)	libero
33	(Poland) Łukasz Usowicz	13 August 1997 (age 29)	middle blocker
88	(Bulgaria) Asparuh Asparuhov	28 July 2000 (age 26)	outside hitter
95	(Poland) Jakub Macyra	22 July 1995 (age 31)	middle blocker
Head coach:		(Poland) Piotr Graban	

== Season by season ==
Season	Tier	League	Pos.
2019–20	1	PlusLiga	9
2020–21	1	PlusLiga	7
2021–22	1	PlusLiga	12
2022–23	1	PlusLiga	9
2023–24	1	PlusLiga	11
2024–25	1	PlusLiga	10
2025–26	1	PlusLiga	10

== Former names ==
Years	Name
2004–2007	ZKS Ślepsk Augustów
2007–2009	MKS Ślepsk Augustów
2009–2019	MKS Ślepsk Suwałki
2019–present	MKS Ślepsk Malow Suwałki

== See also ==
- Ślepsk Suwałki players
- Ślepsk Suwałki coaches
