= Jan Nowakowski =

Polish volleyball player (born 1994)

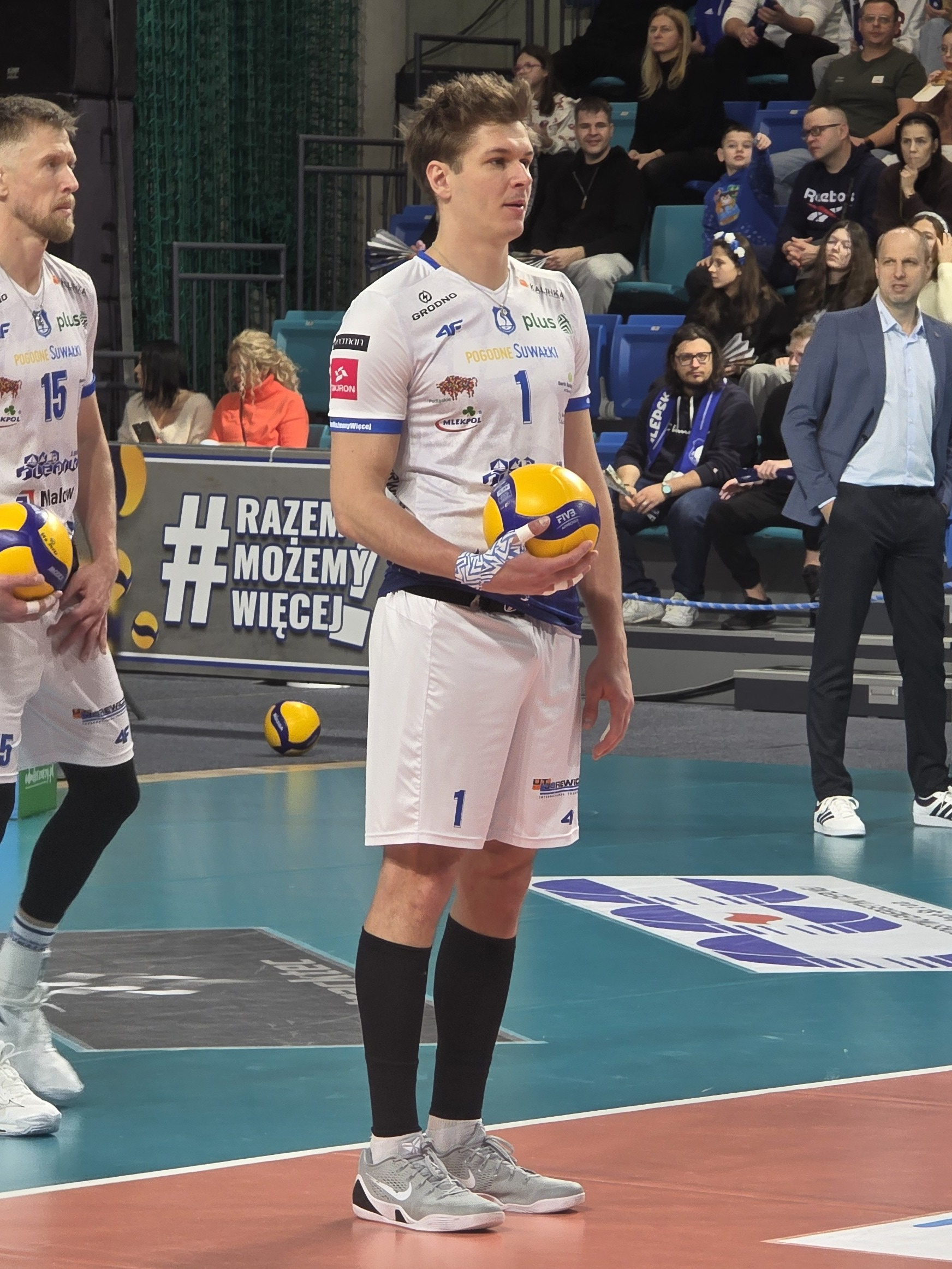
- Jan Nowakowski in 2025

Personal information
- Born: 17 May 1994 (age 32); Bydgoszcz, Poland
- Height: 2.02 m (6 ft 8 in)
- Weight: 105 kg (231 lb)
- Spike: 365 cm (144 in)

Volleyball information
- Position: Middle blocker
- Current club: Ślepsk Suwałki
- Number: 1

Career
Years	Teams
2013–2017; 2017–2019; 2019–2021; 2021–2025; 2025–	Transfer Bydgoszcz; Onico Warsaw; GKS Katowice; LKPS Lublin; Ślepsk Suwałki
Honours
Men's volleyball
Representing Poland
European League
Bronze medal – third place	2015 Poland

Jan Nowakowski (born 17 May 1994) is a Polish professional volleyball player who plays as a middle blocker for Ślepsk Malow Suwałki.

== Personal life ==
He has a younger sister, Pola (born 1996), who is also a volleyball player. On 25 December 2015, he became engaged to Martyna Grajber.

== Career ==
=== National team ===
In 2012 played at CEV U21 European Championship 2012, where Polish junior team took 6th place. In 2015 he was appointed to team B of Polish national team led by Andrzej Kowal. Nowakowski took part in 1st edition of 2015 European Games. On August 14, 2015 he achieved first medal as national team player – bronze of European League. His national team won 3rd place match against Estonia (3–0). He also received individual award for Best Middle Blocker of the tournament.

== Honours ==
=== Club ===
- CEV Challenge Cup
  - 2024–25 – with Bogdanka LUK Lublin
- Domestic
  - 2024–25 Polish Championship, with Bogdanka LUK Lublin

=== Universiade ===
- 2019 Summer Universiade

=== Individual awards ===
- 2015: European League – Best middle blocker
