= AZS Olsztyn (volleyball) squads =

This article shows the previous rosters of AZS Olsztyn volleyball team at PlusLiga, Poland.

== 2020/2021 ==
The following is the Indykpol AZS Olsztyn roster in the 2020–21 PlusLiga.

Head coach:	(Argentina) Daniel Castellani
Assistant:	(Poland) Marcin Mierzejewski

No.	Name	Date of birth	Height	Weight	Spike	Position
2	(Poland) Dawid Woch	16 May 1997	2.00 m (6 ft 7 in)	86 kg (190 lb)	350 cm (140 in)	middle blocker
3	(Poland) Jędrzej Gruszczyński	13 November 1997	1.86 m (6 ft 1 in)	84 kg (185 lb)	325 cm (128 in)	libero
4	(Poland) Przemysław Stępień	7 February 1994	1.85 m (6 ft 1 in)	82 kg (181 lb)	335 cm (132 in)	setter
5	(Cuba) Javier Concepción	27 December 1997	2.00 m (6 ft 7 in)	84 kg (185 lb)	356 cm (140 in)	middle blocker
6	(Netherlands) Robbert Andringa (C)	28 April 1990	1.91 m (6 ft 3 in)	86 kg (190 lb)	330 cm (130 in)	outside hitter
7	(Poland) Damian Schulz	26 February 1990	2.08 m (6 ft 10 in)	95 kg (209 lb)	355 cm (140 in)	opposite
9	(Poland) Jakub Czerwiński	22 July 2001	1.95 m (6 ft 5 in)	89 kg (196 lb)	341 cm (134 in)	outside hitter
10	(Poland) Remigiusz Kapica	28 September 2000	1.99 m (6 ft 6 in)	97 kg (214 lb)	350 cm (140 in)	opposite
11	(Poland) Kamil Droszyński	28 January 1997	1.90 m (6 ft 3 in)	86 kg (190 lb)	337 cm (133 in)	setter
12	(Ukraine) Dmytro Teryomenko	1 February 1987	2.00 m (6 ft 7 in)	96 kg (212 lb)	345 cm (136 in)	middle blocker
13	(Germany) Ruben Schott	8 July 1994	1.92 m (6 ft 4 in)	87 kg (192 lb)	340 cm (130 in)	outside hitter
15	(Poland) Jakub Ciunajtis	6 August 1998	0 m (0 in)	0 kg (0 lb)	0 cm (0 in)	libero
16	(Poland) Mateusz Poręba	24 August 1999	2.04 m (6 ft 8 in)	102 kg (225 lb)	350 cm (140 in)	middle blocker
21	(Poland) Wojciech Żaliński	8 January 1988	1.96 m (6 ft 5 in)	92 kg (203 lb)	345 cm (136 in)	outside hitter

== 2019/2020 ==
The following is the Indykpol AZS Olsztyn roster in the 2019–20 PlusLiga.

Head coach:	(Italy) Paolo Montagnani (2019 – Jan 2020) / (Argentina) Daniel Castellani (Jan 2020 – present)
Assistant:	(Poland) Marcin Mierzejewski

No.	Name	Date of birth	Height	Weight	Spike	Position
1	(Poland) Tomasz Kowalski	12 June 1991	2.02 m (6 ft 8 in)	92 kg (203 lb)	348 cm (137 in)	setter
2	(Czech Republic) Jan Hadrava	3 June 1991	1.98 m (6 ft 6 in)	98 kg (216 lb)	340 cm (130 in)	opposite
3	(Poland) Michał Żurek	3 June 1988	1.81 m (5 ft 11 in)	81 kg (179 lb)	320 cm (130 in)	libero
6	(Netherlands) Robbert Andringa	28 April 1990	1.91 m (6 ft 3 in)	86 kg (190 lb)	330 cm (130 in)	outside hitter
9	(Poland) Paweł Pietraszko	5 October 1990	2.03 m (6 ft 8 in)	96 kg (212 lb)	352 cm (139 in)	middle blocker
10	(Poland) Remigiusz Kapica	28 September 2000	1.99 m (6 ft 6 in)	97 kg (214 lb)	350 cm (140 in)	opposite
12	(Poland) Paweł Woicki (C)	19 June 1983	1.82 m (6 ft 0 in)	84 kg (185 lb)	315 cm (124 in)	setter
15	(Poland) Mateusz Mika	21 January 1991	2.06 m (6 ft 9 in)	91 kg (201 lb)	352 cm (139 in)	outside hitter
16	(Poland) Mateusz Poręba	24 August 1999	2.04 m (6 ft 8 in)	102 kg (225 lb)	350 cm (140 in)	middle blocker
17	(Poland) Jakub Zabłocki	10 April 1995	1.80 m (5 ft 11 in)	77 kg (170 lb)	324 cm (128 in)	libero
18	(Poland) Dawid Sokołowski	6 October 2000	1.93 m (6 ft 4 in)	85 kg (187 lb)	355 cm (140 in)	outside hitter
21	(Poland) Wojciech Żaliński	8 January 1988	1.96 m (6 ft 5 in)	92 kg (203 lb)	345 cm (136 in)	outside hitter
66	(Iran) Mohammad Mousavi	22 August 1987	2.02 m (6 ft 8 in)	92 kg (203 lb)	362 cm (143 in)	middle blocker

== 2018/2019 ==
The following is the Indykpol AZS Olsztyn roster in the 2018–19 PlusLiga.

Head coach:	(Italy) Roberto Santilli (2017 – Dec 2018) / (Poland) Michał Mieszko Gogol (Dec 2018 – 2019)
Assistant:	(Poland) Marcin Mierzejewski

No.	Name	Date of birth	Height	Weight	Spike	Position
1	(Poland) Mateusz Kańczok	3 June 1993	2.04 m (6 ft 8 in)	96 kg (212 lb)	359 cm (141 in)	opposite
2	(Czech Republic) Jan Hadrava	3 June 1991	1.98 m (6 ft 6 in)	98 kg (216 lb)	340 cm (130 in)	opposite
3	(Poland) Michał Żurek	3 June 1988	1.81 m (5 ft 11 in)	81 kg (179 lb)	320 cm (130 in)	libero
4	(Slovakia) Marcel Lux	27 July 1994	2.00 m (6 ft 7 in)	88 kg (194 lb)	341 cm (134 in)	outside hitter
5	(Poland) Miłosz Zniszczoł	2 July 1986	2.01 m (6 ft 7 in)	102 kg (225 lb)	345 cm (136 in)	middle blocker
6	(Netherlands) Robbert Andringa	28 April 1990	1.91 m (6 ft 3 in)	86 kg (190 lb)	330 cm (130 in)	outside hitter
7	(Ukraine) Serhiy Kapelus	22 October 1982	1.91 m (6 ft 3 in)	86 kg (190 lb)	345 cm (136 in)	outside hitter
9	(Poland) Paweł Pietraszko	5 October 1990	2.03 m (6 ft 8 in)	96 kg (212 lb)	352 cm (139 in)	middle blocker
10	(Poland) Radosław Gil	25 January 1997	1.91 m (6 ft 3 in)	82 kg (181 lb)	332 cm (131 in)	setter
12	(Poland) Paweł Woicki (C)	19 June 1983	1.82 m (6 ft 0 in)	84 kg (185 lb)	315 cm (124 in)	setter
13	(Poland) Sebastian Warda	18 January 1989	2.04 m (6 ft 8 in)	104 kg (229 lb)	355 cm (140 in)	middle blocker
14	(Poland) Jakub Urbanowicz	14 August 1993	2.03 m (6 ft 8 in)	86 kg (190 lb)	360 cm (140 in)	outside hitter
16	(Poland) Mateusz Poręba	24 August 1999	2.04 m (6 ft 8 in)	102 kg (225 lb)	350 cm (140 in)	middle blocker
17	(Poland) Jakub Zabłocki	10 April 1995	1.80 m (5 ft 11 in)	77 kg (170 lb)	324 cm (128 in)	libero
18	(Poland) Jakub Zabłocki	6 October 2000	1.93 m (6 ft 4 in)	85 kg (187 lb)	355 cm (140 in)	outside hitter

== 2017/2018 ==
The following is the Indykpol AZS Olsztyn roster in the 2017–18 PlusLiga.

Head coach:	(Italy) Roberto Santilli
Assistant:	(Poland) Marcin Mierzejewski

No.	Name	Date of birth	Height	Weight	Spike	Position
1	(Poland) Mateusz Kańczok	3 June 1993	2.04 m (6 ft 8 in)	96 kg (212 lb)	359 cm (141 in)	opposite
2	(Czech Republic) Jan Hadrava	3 June 1991	1.98 m (6 ft 6 in)	98 kg (216 lb)	340 cm (130 in)	opposite
3	(Poland) Michał Żurek	3 June 1988	1.81 m (5 ft 11 in)	81 kg (179 lb)	320 cm (130 in)	libero
4	(Poland) Daniel Pliński	10 December 1978	2.04 m (6 ft 8 in)	100 kg (220 lb)	330 cm (130 in)	middle blocker
5	(Poland) Miłosz Zniszczoł	2 July 1986	2.01 m (6 ft 7 in)	102 kg (225 lb)	345 cm (136 in)	middle blocker
6	(Netherlands) Robbert Andringa	28 April 1990	1.91 m (6 ft 3 in)	86 kg (190 lb)	330 cm (130 in)	outside hitter
7	(Poland) Jakub Kochanowski	17 July 1997	1.99 m (6 ft 6 in)	84 kg (185 lb)	360 cm (140 in)	middle blocker
10	(Poland) Łukasz Makowski	21 February 1989	1.87 m (6 ft 2 in)	86 kg (190 lb)	305 cm (120 in)	setter
11	(Canada) Blake Scheerhoorn	6 January 1995	2.02 m (6 ft 8 in)	90 kg (200 lb)	359 cm (141 in)	outside hitter
12	(Poland) Paweł Woicki (C)	19 June 1983	1.82 m (6 ft 0 in)	84 kg (185 lb)	315 cm (124 in)	setter
13	(Poland) Adrian Buchowski	30 September 1991	1.94 m (6 ft 4 in)	94 kg (207 lb)	347 cm (137 in)	outside hitter
14	(Belgium) Tomas Rousseaux	31 March 1994	1.99 m (6 ft 6 in)	90 kg (200 lb)	360 cm (140 in)	outside hitter
17	(Poland) Jakub Zabłocki	10 April 1995	1.80 m (5 ft 11 in)	77 kg (170 lb)	324 cm (128 in)	libero

== 2016/2017 ==
The following is the Indykpol AZS Olsztyn roster in the 2016–17 PlusLiga.

Head coach:	(Italy) Andrea Gardini
Assistant:	(Poland) Piotr Poskrobko

No.	Name	Date of birth	Height	Weight	Spike	Position
2	(Czech Republic) Jan Hadrava	3 June 1991	1.98 m (6 ft 6 in)	98 kg (216 lb)	340 cm (130 in)	opposite
3	(Poland) Michał Żurek	3 June 1988	1.81 m (5 ft 11 in)	81 kg (179 lb)	320 cm (130 in)	libero
4	(Poland) Daniel Pliński	10 December 1978	2.04 m (6 ft 8 in)	100 kg (220 lb)	330 cm (130 in)	middle blocker
5	(Poland) Miłosz Zniszczoł	2 July 1986	2.01 m (6 ft 7 in)	102 kg (225 lb)	345 cm (136 in)	middle blocker
6	(Poland) Michał Tomczak	20 October 1995	1.92 m (6 ft 4 in)	84 kg (185 lb)	328 cm (129 in)	setter
7	(Poland) Jakub Kochanowski	17 July 1997	1.99 m (6 ft 6 in)	84 kg (185 lb)	360 cm (140 in)	middle blocker
8	(Netherlands) Hidde Boswinkel	30 March 1995	2.02 m (6 ft 8 in)	100 kg (220 lb)	343 cm (135 in)	opposite
9	(Poland) Piotr Szostek	28 July 1997	1.93 m (6 ft 4 in)	75 kg (165 lb)	325 cm (128 in)	opposite
10	(Poland) Łukasz Makowski	21 February 1989	1.87 m (6 ft 2 in)	86 kg (190 lb)	305 cm (120 in)	setter
11	(Poland) Aleksander Śliwka	24 May 1995	1.98 m (6 ft 6 in)	83 kg (183 lb)	342 cm (135 in)	outside hitter
12	(Poland) Paweł Woicki (C)	19 June 1983	1.82 m (6 ft 0 in)	84 kg (185 lb)	315 cm (124 in)	setter
13	(Poland) Adrian Buchowski	30 September 1991	1.94 m (6 ft 4 in)	94 kg (207 lb)	347 cm (137 in)	outside hitter
14	(Argentina) Ezequiel Palacios	2 October 1992	2.00 m (6 ft 7 in)	92 kg (203 lb)	349 cm (137 in)	outside hitter
17	(Poland) Jakub Zabłocki	10 April 1995	1.80 m (5 ft 11 in)	77 kg (170 lb)	324 cm (128 in)	libero
18	(Poland) Leszek Wójcik	6 November 1996	1.95 m (6 ft 5 in)	71 kg (157 lb)	350 cm (140 in)	outside hitter
19	(Poland) Marek Kurmin	22 June 1995	1.85 m (6 ft 1 in)	70 kg (150 lb)	320 cm (130 in)	setter
20	(Poland) Wojciech Włodarczyk	28 October 1990	2.00 m (6 ft 7 in)	88 kg (194 lb)	348 cm (137 in)	outside hitter

== 2015/2016 ==
The following is the Indykpol AZS Olsztyn roster in the 2015–16 PlusLiga.

Head coach:	(Italy) Andrea Gardini
Assistant:	(Poland) Piotr Poskrobko

No.	Name	Date of birth	Height	Weight	Spike	Position
1	(Poland) Marcin Waliński	24 October 1990	1.95 m (6 ft 5 in)	94 kg (207 lb)	338 cm (133 in)	outside hitter
2	(Belgium) Bram Van Den Dries	14 August 1989	2.06 m (6 ft 9 in)	99 kg (218 lb)	361 cm (142 in)	opposite
2	(Finland) Mikko Oivanen	26 May 1986	1.98 m (6 ft 6 in)	92 kg (203 lb)	360 cm (140 in)	opposite
3	(Poland) Maciej Ostaszyk	22 December 1995	1.99 m (6 ft 6 in)	85 kg (187 lb)	340 cm (130 in)	middle blocker
5	(Poland) Miłosz Zniszczoł	2 July 1986	2.01 m (6 ft 7 in)	102 kg (225 lb)	345 cm (136 in)	middle blocker
6	(Serbia) Filip Stoilović	11 October 1992	1.95 m (6 ft 5 in)	89 kg (196 lb)	337 cm (133 in)	outside hitter
7	(Poland) Bartosz Bednorz	25 July 1994	2.01 m (6 ft 7 in)	87 kg (192 lb)	350 cm (140 in)	outside hitter
8	(Poland) Krzysztof Gulak	29 August 1996	1.96 m (6 ft 5 in)	90 kg (200 lb)	341 cm (134 in)	outside hitter
9	(Poland) Paweł Adamajtis	30 August 1990	1.99 m (6 ft 6 in)	91 kg (201 lb)	360 cm (140 in)	opposite
11	(Poland) Maciej Zajder	31 January 1988	0 m (0 in)	0 kg (0 lb)	0 cm (0 in)	middle blocker
12	(Poland) Paweł Woicki (C)	19 June 1983	1.82 m (6 ft 0 in)	84 kg (185 lb)	315 cm (124 in)	setter
13	(Poland) Krzysztof Bieńkowski	19 June 1995	1.98 m (6 ft 6 in)	87 kg (192 lb)	336 cm (132 in)	setter
14	(Poland) Michał Potera	6 March 1988	1.83 m (6 ft 0 in)	78 kg (172 lb)	323 cm (127 in)	libero
15	(Netherlands) Thomas Koelewijn	18 December 1988	2.07 m (6 ft 9 in)	100 kg (220 lb)	360 cm (140 in)	middle blocker
17	(Poland) Jakub Zabłocki	10 April 1995	1.80 m (5 ft 11 in)	77 kg (170 lb)	324 cm (128 in)	libero
18	(Poland) Leszek Wójcik	6 November 1996	1.95 m (6 ft 5 in)	71 kg (157 lb)	350 cm (140 in)	outside hitter

== 2014/2015 ==
The following is the Indykpol AZS Olsztyn roster in the 2014–15 PlusLiga.

Head coach:	(Poland) Krzysztof Stelmach (2013 – Dec 2014) / (Italy) Andrea Gardini (Dec 2014 – 2017)
Assistant:	(Poland) Wojciech Janas

No.	Name	Date of birth	Height	Weight	Spike	Position
1	(Poland) Maciej Dobrowolski (C)	19 March 1977	1.90 m (6 ft 3 in)	86 kg (190 lb)	326 cm (128 in)	setter
2	(Poland) Krzysztof Gulak	29 August 1996	1.96 m (6 ft 5 in)	90 kg (200 lb)	341 cm (134 in)	outside hitter
5	(Poland) Jakub Bik	17 February 1992	1.83 m (6 ft 0 in)	76 kg (168 lb)	310 cm (120 in)	libero
7	(Poland) Bartosz Bednorz	25 July 1994	2.01 m (6 ft 7 in)	87 kg (192 lb)	350 cm (140 in)	outside hitter
8	(Poland) Miłosz Zniszczoł	2 July 1986	2.01 m (6 ft 7 in)	102 kg (225 lb)	345 cm (136 in)	middle blocker
9	(Poland) Paweł Adamajtis	30 August 1990	1.99 m (6 ft 6 in)	91 kg (201 lb)	360 cm (140 in)	opposite
10	(Poland) Grzegorz Szymański	12 July 1978	2.02 m (6 ft 8 in)	94 kg (207 lb)	345 cm (136 in)	opposite
11	(Poland) Maciej Zajder	31 January 1988	0 m (0 in)	0 kg (0 lb)	0 cm (0 in)	middle blocker
13	(Poland) Piotr Łuka	9 June 1980	0 m (0 in)	0 kg (0 lb)	0 cm (0 in)	outside hitter
14	(Poland) Michał Potera	6 March 1988	1.83 m (6 ft 0 in)	78 kg (172 lb)	323 cm (127 in)	libero
15	(Slovakia) Juraj Zatko	5 June 1987	1.90 m (6 ft 3 in)	87 kg (192 lb)	330 cm (130 in)	setter
16	(Poland) Piotr Hain	26 February 1991	2.07 m (6 ft 9 in)	91 kg (201 lb)	343 cm (135 in)	middle blocker
17	(Slovakia) František Ogurčák	24 April 1984	1.98 m (6 ft 6 in)	95 kg (209 lb)	348 cm (137 in)	outside hitter
18	(Brazil) Levi Cabral	16 May 1989	1.98 m (6 ft 6 in)	87 kg (192 lb)	345 cm (136 in)	outside hitter

== 2013/2014 ==
The following is the Indykpol AZS Olsztyn roster in the 2013–14 PlusLiga.

Head coach:	(Poland) Krzysztof Stelmach
Assistant:	(Poland) Wojciech Bańbuła

No.	Name	Date of birth	Height	Weight	Spike	Position
1	(Poland) Maciej Dobrowolski (C)	19 March 1977	1.90 m (6 ft 3 in)	86 kg (190 lb)	326 cm (128 in)	setter
3	(Poland) Michał Żurek	3 June 1988	1.81 m (5 ft 11 in)	81 kg (179 lb)	320 cm (130 in)	libero
4	(Poland) Bartosz Mariański	26 May 1992	1.87 m (6 ft 2 in)	76 kg (168 lb)	315 cm (124 in)	libero
6	(Argentina) Pablo Bengolea	8 May 1986	1.98 m (6 ft 6 in)	91 kg (201 lb)	350 cm (140 in)	outside hitter
7	(Poland) Dariusz Kurmin	20 June 1980	1.97 m (6 ft 6 in)	86 kg (190 lb)	339 cm (133 in)	middle blocker
8	(Poland) Rafał Buszek	28 April 1987	1.96 m (6 ft 5 in)	88 kg (194 lb)	348 cm (137 in)	outside hitter
10	(Poland) Grzegorz Szymański	12 July 1978	2.02 m (6 ft 8 in)	94 kg (207 lb)	345 cm (136 in)	opposite
11	(Poland) Wojciech Sobala	12 May 1988	2.07 m (6 ft 9 in)	96 kg (212 lb)	355 cm (140 in)	middle blocker
13	(Poland) Piotr Łukasik	11 July 1994	2.08 m (6 ft 10 in)	112 kg (247 lb)	350 cm (140 in)	outside hitter
14	(Poland) Grzegorz Pająk	1 January 1987	1.96 m (6 ft 5 in)	94 kg (207 lb)	349 cm (137 in)	setter
15	(Finland) Matti Oivanen	26 May 1986	1.99 m (6 ft 6 in)	93 kg (205 lb)	355 cm (140 in)	middle blocker
16	(Poland) Piotr Hain	26 February 1991	2.07 m (6 ft 9 in)	91 kg (201 lb)	343 cm (135 in)	middle blocker
17	(Poland) Bartosz Krzysiek	19 February 1990	2.07 m (6 ft 9 in)	98 kg (216 lb)	361 cm (142 in)	opposite
18	(Poland) Piotr Łuka	9 June 1980	0 m (0 in)	0 kg (0 lb)	0 cm (0 in)	outside hitter
