= 2021–22 PlusLiga =

- League: PlusLiga
- Sport: Volleyball
- Duration: 1 October 2021 – 14 May 2022
- Games: 213
- Teams: 14
- TV partner: Telewizja Polsat
- League champions: ZAKSA Kędzierzyn-Koźle (9th title)

Seasons
- 2020–21 2022–23

The 2021–22 PlusLiga was the 86th season of the Polish Volleyball Championship, the 69th season of the highest tier domestic division in the Polish volleyball league system since its establishment in 1954, and the 22nd season as a professional league. The league is operated by the Polish Volleyball League SA (Polish: Polska Liga Siatkówki SA).

This season was composed of 14 teams. The regular season was played as a round-robin tournament. Each team played a total of 26 matches, half at home and half away. The season started on 1 October 2021 and concluded on 14 May 2022.

ZAKSA Kędzierzyn-Koźle won their 9th title of the Polish Champions.

== Regular season ==
Ranking system:

1. Points
2. Number of victories
3. Set ratio
4. Setpoint ratio
5. H2H results

Result	Winners	Losers
3–0	3 points	0 points
3–1	3 points	0 points
3–2	2 points	1 point

Pos	Team	Pld	W	L	Pts	SW	SL	SR	SPW	SPL	SPR	Qualification or relegation
1	ZAKSA Kędzierzyn-Koźle	26	22	4	65	72	22	3.273	2269	1964	1.155	Quarterfinals
2	Jastrzębski Węgiel	26	22	4	65	70	25	2.800	2264	1977	1.145	Quarterfinals
3	PGE Skra Bełchatów	26	21	5	60	72	37	1.946	2481	2324	1.068	Quarterfinals
4	Aluron CMC Warta Zawiercie	26	17	9	47	56	45	1.244	2311	2292	1.008	Quarterfinals
5	Asseco Resovia	26	14	12	45	55	44	1.250	2275	2187	1.040	Quarterfinals
6	Indykpol AZS Olsztyn	26	14	12	41	51	45	1.133	2142	2122	1.009	Quarterfinals
7	Trefl Gdańsk	26	12	14	36	48	49	0.980	2153	2160	0.997	Quarterfinals
8	GKS Katowice	26	12	14	36	49	54	0.907	2267	2340	0.969	Quarterfinals
9	Projekt Warsaw	26	12	14	36	47	55	0.855	2281	2313	0.986	
10	Cuprum Lubin	26	8	18	26	42	63	0.667	2284	2411	0.947	
11	LUK Lublin	26	8	18	24	36	62	0.581	2129	2264	0.940	
12	Ślepsk Malow Suwałki	26	7	19	24	34	63	0.540	2149	2269	0.947	
13	Cerrad Enea Czarni Radom	26	7	19	21	29	65	0.446	1970	2234	0.882	
14	PSG Stal Nysa	26	6	20	20	34	66	0.515	2178	2296	0.949	Relegation playoffs

Source: PlusLiga

=== 1st round ===
Date	Time		Score		Set 1	Set 2	Set 3	Set 4	Set 5	Total	Report
1 Oct	20:30	LUK Lublin	1–3	Jastrzębski Węgiel	15–25	21–25	25–21	16–25		77–96	
2 Oct	17:30	Stal Nysa	0–3	ZAKSA Kędzierzyn-Koźle	22–25	21–25	20–25			63–75	
3 Oct	20:30	Cerrad Enea Czarni Radom	0–3	Projekt Warsaw	16–25	17–25	23–25			56–75	
4 Oct	20:30	Cuprum Lubin	1–3	PGE Skra Bełchatów	22–25	19–25	25–22	25–27		91–99	
2 Oct	14:45	Indykpol AZS Olsztyn	0–3	Asseco Resovia	22–25	18–25	20–25			60–75	
3 Oct	17:30	GKS Katowice	3–2	Trefl Gdańsk	25–20	25–20	19–25	21–25	15–12	105–102	
3 Oct	14:45	Aluron CMC Warta Zawiercie	3–1	Ślepsk Malow Suwałki	25–23	23–25	25–23	25–21		98–92	

=== 2nd round ===
Date	Time		Score		Set 1	Set 2	Set 3	Set 4	Set 5	Total	Report
9 Oct	20:30	Ślepsk Malow Suwałki	3–0	LUK Lublin	25–19	25–16	25–22			75–57	
10 Oct	14:45	Trefl Gdańsk	1–3	Aluron CMC Warta Zawiercie	25–21	18–25	22–25	22–25		87–96	
9 Oct	17:30	GKS Katowice	3–0	Asseco Resovia	25–22	25–22	25–23			75–67	
10 Oct	17:30	PGE Skra Bełchatów	3–2	Indykpol AZS Olsztyn	25–16	25–22	23–25	17–25	15–10	105–98	
8 Oct	20:30	Projekt Warsaw	3–1	Cuprum Lubin	18–25	25–17	25–17	31–29		99–88	
9 Oct	14:45	Cerrad Enea Czarni Radom	0–3	ZAKSA Kędzierzyn-Koźle	20–25	16–25	17–25			53–75	
8 Oct	17:30	Jastrzębski Węgiel	3–0	Stal Nysa	25–18	25–20	25–19			75–57	

=== 3rd round ===
Date	Time		Score		Set 1	Set 2	Set 3	Set 4	Set 5	Total	Report
16 Oct	17:30	ZAKSA Kędzierzyn-Koźle	3–0	LUK Lublin	25–22	25–13	25–19			75–54	
15 Oct	20:30	Projekt Warsaw	3–2	Jastrzębski Węgiel	20–25	25–21	19–25	32–30	22–20	118–121	
16 Oct	20:30	PGE Skra Bełchatów	3–2	Stal Nysa	25–17	19–25	25–23	21–25	20–18	110–108	
17 Oct	14:45	Asseco Resovia	3–0	Cerrad Enea Czarni Radom	25–23	26–24	25–14			76–61	
17 Oct	17:30	Trefl Gdańsk	3–0	Cuprum Lubin	25–23	25–15	25–15			75–53	
17 Oct	20:30	Ślepsk Malow Suwałki	0–3	Indykpol AZS Olsztyn	29–31	21–25	26–28			76–84	
16 Oct	14:45	Aluron CMC Warta Zawiercie	3–1	GKS Katowice	21–25	25–20	25–19	25–21		96–85	

=== 4th round ===
Date	Time		Score		Set 1	Set 2	Set 3	Set 4	Set 5	Total	Report
22 Oct	20:30	LUK Lublin	3–0	GKS Katowice	25–19	26–24	25–22			76–65	
24 Oct	17:30	Indykpol AZS Olsztyn	3–0	Aluron CMC Warta Zawiercie	25–18	25–20	25–23			75–61	
25 Oct	20:30	Cuprum Lubin	3–0	Ślepsk Malow Suwałki	25–18	25–22	25–22			75–62	
23 Oct	17:30	Cerrad Enea Czarni Radom	3–1	Trefl Gdańsk	25–19	20–25	31–29	26–24		102–97	
23 Oct	20:30	Stal Nysa	1–3	Asseco Resovia	21–25	25–17	21–25	18–25		85–92	
24 Oct	14:45	Jastrzębski Węgiel	3–1	PGE Skra Bełchatów	25–18	25–20	17–25	25–18		92–81	
23 Oct	14:45	ZAKSA Kędzierzyn-Koźle	3–2	Projekt Warsaw	25–27	25–18	14–25	25–18	15–9	104–97	

=== 5th round ===
Date	Time		Score		Set 1	Set 2	Set 3	Set 4	Set 5	Total	Report
29 Oct	20:30	Projekt Warsaw	3–1	LUK Lublin	29–31	25–19	25–22	25–19		104–91	
30 Oct	14:45	PGE Skra Bełchatów	2–3	ZAKSA Kędzierzyn-Koźle	26–24	29–27	23–25	19–25	12–15	109–116	
31 Oct	14:45	Asseco Resovia	0–3	Jastrzębski Węgiel	23–25	21–25	18–25			62–75	
30 Oct	17:30	Trefl Gdańsk	3–0	Stal Nysa	25–22	25–19	25–21			75–62	
30 Oct	20:30	Ślepsk Malow Suwałki	1–3	Cerrad Enea Czarni Radom	26–28	25–23	27–29	23–25		101–105	
28 Oct	17:30	Aluron CMC Warta Zawiercie	3–2	Cuprum Lubin	25–20	24–26	17–25	25–22	15–11	106–104	
31 Oct	20:30	GKS Katowice	0–3	Indykpol AZS Olsztyn	16–25	17–25	20–25			53–75	

=== 6th round ===
Date	Time		Score		Set 1	Set 2	Set 3	Set 4	Set 5	Total	Report
5 Nov	20:30	LUK Lublin	2–3	Indykpol AZS Olsztyn	25–21	20–25	21–25	25–20	12–15	103–106	
6 Nov	17:30	Cuprum Lubin	3–1	GKS Katowice	25–27	25–20	25–19	25–19		100–85	
6 Nov	20:30	Cerrad Enea Czarni Radom	0–3	Aluron CMC Warta Zawiercie	21–25	20–25	19–25			60–75	
7 Nov	20:30	Stal Nysa	1–3	Ślepsk Malow Suwałki	22–25	25–17	15–25	21–25		83–92	
7 Nov	17:30	Jastrzębski Węgiel	3–0	Trefl Gdańsk	25–14	25–22	25–22			75–58	
6 Nov	14:45	ZAKSA Kędzierzyn-Koźle	3–1	Asseco Resovia	17–25	25–15	25–18	25–19		92–77	
7 Nov	14:45	Projekt Warsaw	0–3	PGE Skra Bełchatów	17–25	21–25	23–25			61–75	

=== 7th round ===
Date	Time		Score		Set 1	Set 2	Set 3	Set 4	Set 5	Total	Report
13 Nov	17:30	PGE Skra Bełchatów	2–3	LUK Lublin	25–16	26–24	22–25	18–25	12–15	103–105	
13 Nov	14:45	Asseco Resovia	3–0	Projekt Warsaw	25–21	26–24	25–20			76–65	
14 Nov	14:45	Trefl Gdańsk	0–3	ZAKSA Kędzierzyn-Koźle	23–25	20–25	14–25			57–75	
14 Nov	17:30	Ślepsk Malow Suwałki	0–3	Jastrzębski Węgiel	22–25	20–25	19–25			61–75	
13 Nov	20:30	Aluron CMC Warta Zawiercie	3–0	Stal Nysa	25–20	25–22	25–22			75–64	
12 Nov	17:30	GKS Katowice	3–1	Cerrad Enea Czarni Radom	25–17	18–25	29–27	25–21		97–90	
15 Nov	17:30	Indykpol AZS Olsztyn	3–0	Cuprum Lubin	25–20	25–21	25–17			75–58	

=== 8th round ===
Date	Time		Score		Set 1	Set 2	Set 3	Set 4	Set 5	Total	Report
22 Nov	20:30	PGE Skra Bełchatów	3–2	Asseco Resovia	22–25	20–25	25–17	25–19	15–13	107–99	
21 Nov	17:30	LUK Lublin	3–2	Cuprum Lubin	19–25	25–17	25–17	28–30	19–17	116–106	
20 Nov	20:30	Cerrad Enea Czarni Radom	0–3	Indykpol AZS Olsztyn	23–25	23–25	23–25			69–75	
19 Nov	20:30	Stal Nysa	2–3	GKS Katowice	22–25	21–25	25–20	25–17	10–15	103–102	
20 Nov	14:45	Jastrzębski Węgiel	2–3	Aluron CMC Warta Zawiercie	18–25	25–17	25–27	25–16	13–15	106–100	
20 Nov	17:30	ZAKSA Kędzierzyn-Koźle	3–0	Ślepsk Malow Suwałki	25–17	25–22	25–18			75–57	
21 Nov	14:45	Projekt Warsaw	3–0	Trefl Gdańsk	25–21	25–20	25–20			75–61	

=== 9th round ===
Date	Time		Score		Set 1	Set 2	Set 3	Set 4	Set 5	Total	Report
27 Nov	20:30	Asseco Resovia	1–3	LUK Lublin	21–25	25–23	22–25	23–25		91–98	
28 Nov	14:45	Trefl Gdańsk	0–3	PGE Skra Bełchatów	18–25	13–25	22–25			53–75	
26 Nov	20:30	Ślepsk Malow Suwałki	1–3	Projekt Warsaw	18–25	25–23	22–25	23–25		88–98	
27 Nov	14:45	Aluron CMC Warta Zawiercie	0–3	ZAKSA Kędzierzyn-Koźle	36–38	13–25	14–25			63–88	
27 Nov	17:30	GKS Katowice	0–3	Jastrzębski Węgiel	17–25	20–25	21–25			58–75	
28 Nov	17:30	Indykpol AZS Olsztyn	3–2	Stal Nysa	25–23	20–25	20–25	25–13	15–13	105–99	
29 Nov	20:30	Cuprum Lubin	2–3	Cerrad Enea Czarni Radom	23–25	25–19	26–24	23–25	15–17	112–110	

=== 10th round ===
Date	Time		Score		Set 1	Set 2	Set 3	Set 4	Set 5	Total	Report
5 Dec	17:30	LUK Lublin	3–1	Cerrad Enea Czarni Radom	25–13	22–25	25–18	25–14		97–70	
5 Dec	20:30	Stal Nysa	1–3	Cuprum Lubin	23–25	35–33	17–25	19–25		94–108	
4 Dec	14:45	Indykpol AZS Olsztyn	0–3	Jastrzębski Węgiel	21–25	18–25	20–25			59–75	
3 Dec	17:30	ZAKSA Kędzierzyn-Koźle	3–0	GKS Katowice	25–18	25–23	25–19			75–60	
6 Dec	20:30	Projekt Warsaw	3–1	Aluron CMC Warta Zawiercie	31–33	25–23	25–19	26–24		107–99	
4 Dec	17:30	PGE Skra Bełchatów	3–0	Ślepsk Malow Suwałki	25–22	25–22	25–22			75–66	
5 Dec	14:45	Asseco Resovia	0–3	Trefl Gdańsk	21–25	20–25	21–25			62–75	

=== 11th round ===
Date	Time		Score		Set 1	Set 2	Set 3	Set 4	Set 5	Total	Report
12 Dec	20:30	Trefl Gdańsk	3–0	LUK Lublin	25–20	25–22	25–16			75–58	
12 Dec	17:30	Ślepsk Malow Suwałki	0–3	Asseco Resovia	21–25	18–25	22–25			61–75	
13 Dec	17:30	Aluron CMC Warta Zawiercie	3–2	PGE Skra Bełchatów	25–21	10–25	25–18	23–25	26–24	109–113	
12 Dec	14:45	GKS Katowice	2–3	Projekt Warsaw	25–21	22–25	25–20	18–25	9–15	99–106	
10 Dec	20:30	ZAKSA Kędzierzyn-Koźle	3–0	Indykpol AZS Olsztyn	25–23	25–20	25–16			75–59	
11 Dec	14:45	Cuprum Lubin	0–3	Jastrzębski Węgiel	28–30	18–25	17–25			63–80	
11 Dec	20:30	Cerrad Enea Czarni Radom	3–1	Stal Nysa	25–18	21–25	25–23	25–21		96–87	

=== 12th round ===
Date	Time		Score		Set 1	Set 2	Set 3	Set 4	Set 5	Total	Report
20 Dec	20:30	LUK Lublin	0–3	Stal Nysa	30–32	22–25	22–25			74–82	
18 Dec	20:30	Jastrzębski Węgiel	3–0	Cerrad Enea Czarni Radom	25–18	25–9	25–22			75–49	
19 Dec	17:30	ZAKSA Kędzierzyn-Koźle	3–1	Cuprum Lubin	25–23	22–25	25–18	25–19		97–85	
19 Dec	14:45	Projekt Warsaw	3–2	Indykpol AZS Olsztyn	21–25	25–14	23–25	25–14	15–8	109–86	
17 Dec	20:30	PGE Skra Bełchatów	3–1	GKS Katowice	25–22	19–25	25–20	25–16		94–83	
18 Dec	14:45	Asseco Resovia	1–3	Aluron CMC Warta Zawiercie	15–25	20–25	25–18	22–25		82–93	
19 Dec	20:30	Trefl Gdańsk	1–3	Ślepsk Malow Suwałki	26–28	19–25	25–20	25–27		95–100	

=== 13th round ===
Date	Time		Score		Set 1	Set 2	Set 3	Set 4	Set 5	Total	Report
29 Dec	17:30	LUK Lublin	1–3	Aluron CMC Warta Zawiercie	23–25	22–25	25–17	21–25		91–92	
25 Feb	20:30	GKS Katowice	2–3	Ślepsk Malow Suwałki	18–25	25–18	20–25	25–22	16–18	104–108	
16 Mar	17:30	Indykpol AZS Olsztyn	3–1	Trefl Gdańsk	23–25	25–22	25–22	25–20		98–89	
30 Dec	17:30	Cuprum Lubin	1–3	Asseco Resovia	20–25	25–23	27–29	23–25		95–102	
30 Dec	20:30	Cerrad Enea Czarni Radom	0–3	PGE Skra Bełchatów	20–25	19–25	22–25			61–75	
10 Nov	20:30	Stal Nysa	1–3	Projekt Warsaw	25–23	23–25	23–25	19–25		90–98	
10 Nov	17:30	ZAKSA Kędzierzyn-Koźle	3–0	Jastrzębski Węgiel	28–26	25–22	25–22			78–70	

=== 14th round ===
Date	Time		Score		Set 1	Set 2	Set 3	Set 4	Set 5	Total	Report
3 Jan	20:30	Jastrzębski Węgiel	3–0	LUK Lublin	25–15	25–21	25–22			75–58	
4 Jan	20:30	ZAKSA Kędzierzyn-Koźle	3–0	Stal Nysa	25–20	25–15	25–23			75–58	
3 Jan	17:30	Projekt Warsaw	2–3	Cerrad Enea Czarni Radom	28–26	25–19	17–25	24–26	13–15	107–111	
4 Jan	17:30	PGE Skra Bełchatów	3–1	Cuprum Lubin	25–22	23–25	25–22	25–20		98–89	
5 Jan	17:30	Asseco Resovia	3–0	Indykpol AZS Olsztyn	31–29	25–22	25–14			81–65	
5 Jan	20:30	Trefl Gdańsk	1–3	GKS Katowice	23–25	25–23	13–25	24–26		85–99	
6 Jan	17:30	Ślepsk Malow Suwałki	0–3	Aluron CMC Warta Zawiercie	21–25	23–25	20–25			64–75	

=== 15th round ===
Date	Time		Score		Set 1	Set 2	Set 3	Set 4	Set 5	Total	Report
10 Jan	20:30	LUK Lublin	3–1	Ślepsk Malow Suwałki	25–16	18–25	25–22	25–21		93–84	
9 Jan	20:30	Aluron CMC Warta Zawiercie	3–0	Trefl Gdańsk	25–19	25–16	25–22			75–57	
9 Jan	17:30	Asseco Resovia	3–1	GKS Katowice	21–25	25–18	33–31	25–22		104–96	
8 Jan	14:45	Indykpol AZS Olsztyn	1–3	PGE Skra Bełchatów	23–25	25–21	26–28	26–28		100–102	
2 Mar	20:30	Cuprum Lubin	1–3	Projekt Warsaw	23–25	25–19	23–25	20–25		91–94	
2 Mar	17:30	ZAKSA Kędzierzyn-Koźle	1–3	Cerrad Enea Czarni Radom	25–18	22–25	23–25	19–25		89–93	
8 Jan	20:30	Stal Nysa	0–3	Jastrzębski Węgiel	18–25	16–25	22–25			56–75	

=== 16th round ===
Date	Time		Score		Set 1	Set 2	Set 3	Set 4	Set 5	Total	Report
15 Jan	20:30	LUK Lublin	1–3	ZAKSA Kędzierzyn-Koźle	18–25	25–22	22–25	25–27		90–99	
23 Mar	17:30	Jastrzębski Węgiel	3–1	Projekt Warsaw	21–25	25–21	25–20	25–17		96–83	
15 Jan	17:30	Stal Nysa	1–3	PGE Skra Bełchatów	18–25	18–25	25–19	22–25		83–94	
9 Mar	17:30	Cerrad Enea Czarni Radom	0–3	Asseco Resovia	21–25	28–30	16–25			65–80	
14 Jan	20:30	Cuprum Lubin	3–1	Trefl Gdańsk	18–25	25–20	25–22	25–21		93–88	
15 Jan	14:45	Indykpol AZS Olsztyn	3–2	Ślepsk Malow Suwałki	25–23	23–25	25–23	25–27	15–12	113–110	
16 Jan	17:30	GKS Katowice	3–0	Aluron CMC Warta Zawiercie	28–26	31–29	25–21			84–76	

=== 17th round ===
Date	Time		Score		Set 1	Set 2	Set 3	Set 4	Set 5	Total	Report
24 Jan	17:30	GKS Katowice	3–1	LUK Lublin	25–20	25–17	23–25	27–25		100–87	
23 Jan	14:45	Aluron CMC Warta Zawiercie	3–2	Indykpol AZS Olsztyn	25–19	21–25	25–20	17–25	16–14	104–103	
23 Jan	17:30	Ślepsk Malow Suwałki	3–1	Cuprum Lubin	25–18	25–20	18–25	25–18		93–81	
24 Jan	20:30	Trefl Gdańsk	3–0	Cerrad Enea Czarni Radom	25–13	25–23	25–17			75–53	
22 Jan	20:30	Asseco Resovia	3–2	PSG Stal Nysa	23–25	25–17	18–25	25–15	15–13	106–95	
22 Jan	14:45	PGE Skra Bełchatów	2–3	Jastrzębski Węgiel	25–23	20–25	23–25	26–24	10–15	104–112	
22 Jan	17:30	Projekt Warsaw	1–3	ZAKSA Kędzierzyn-Koźle	25–22	15–25	22–25	19–25		81–97	

=== 18th round ===
Date	Time		Score		Set 1	Set 2	Set 3	Set 4	Set 5	Total	Report
29 Jan	14:45	LUK Lublin	3–0	Projekt Warsaw	25–23	26–24	25–12			76–59	
15 Mar	20:30	ZAKSA Kędzierzyn-Koźle	1–3	PGE Skra Bełchatów	23–25	27–29	25–19	25–27		100–100	
16 Jan	14:45	Jastrzębski Węgiel	3–1	Asseco Resovia	26–24	25–23	20–25	25–19		96–91	
28 Jan	20:30	PSG Stal Nysa	0–3	Trefl Gdańsk	23–25	23–25	22–25			68–75	
28 Jan	17:30	Cerrad Enea Czarni Radom	0–3	Ślepsk Malow Suwałki	20–25	24–26	16–25			60–76	
27 Jan	17:30	Cuprum Lubin	2–3	Aluron CMC Warta Zawiercie	20–25	21–25	25–22	26–24	11–15	103–111	
30 Jan	14:45	Indykpol AZS Olsztyn	3–2	GKS Katowice	26–24	26–28	16–25	25–17	15–12	108–106	

=== 19th round ===
Date	Time		Score		Set 1	Set 2	Set 3	Set 4	Set 5	Total	Report
7 Feb	17:30	Indykpol AZS Olsztyn	3–0	LUK Lublin	25–20	25–14	25–17			75–51	
6 Feb	20:30	GKS Katowice	3–2	Cuprum Lubin	18–25	25–17	25–23	19–25	15–12	102–102	
6 Feb	17:30	Aluron CMC Warta Zawiercie	0–3	Cerrad Enea Czarni Radom	22–25	16–25	21–25			59–75	
5 Feb	20:30	Ślepsk Malow Suwałki	2–3	PSG Stal Nysa	25–18	25–23	18–25	22–25	10–15	100–106	
9 Apr	14:45	Trefl Gdańsk	2–3	Jastrzębski Węgiel	25–23	25–23	22–25	20–25	21–23	113–119	
22 Mar	17:30	Asseco Resovia	2–3	ZAKSA Kędzierzyn-Koźle	27–25	25–20	16–25	23–25	13–15	104–110	
5 Feb	17:30	PGE Skra Bełchatów	3–1	Projekt Warsaw	25–21	15–25	25–23	25–20		90–89	

=== 20th round ===
Date	Time		Score		Set 1	Set 2	Set 3	Set 4	Set 5	Total	Report
11 Feb	20:30	LUK Lublin	0–3	PGE Skra Bełchatów	17–25	19–25	18–25			54–75	
12 Feb	15:30	Projekt Warsaw	1–3	Asseco Resovia	25–21	21–25	15–25	18–25		79–96	
11 Apr	17:30	ZAKSA Kędzierzyn-Koźle	2–3	Trefl Gdańsk	25–22	25–21	20–25	16–25	12–15	98–108	
13 Feb	14:45	Jastrzębski Węgiel	3–0	Ślepsk Malow Suwałki	25–21	25–19	25–20			75–60	
12 Feb	20:30	PSG Stal Nysa	1–3	Aluron CMC Warta Zawiercie	22–25	25–22	22–25	19–25		88–97	
14 Feb	20:30	Cerrad Enea Czarni Radom	0–3	GKS Katowice	15–25	24–26	16–25			55–76	
12 Feb	18:00	Cuprum Lubin	0–3	Indykpol AZS Olsztyn	18–25	16–25	16–25			50–75	

=== 21st round ===
Date	Time		Score		Set 1	Set 2	Set 3	Set 4	Set 5	Total	Report
18 Feb	20:30	Cuprum Lubin	3–2	LUK Lublin	25–20	21–25	22–25	25–20	15–12	108–102	
21 Feb	17:30	Indykpol AZS Olsztyn	3–0	Cerrad Enea Czarni Radom	25–22	25–23	25–16			75–61	
19 Feb	20:30	GKS Katowice	3–1	PSG Stal Nysa	13–25	25–20	29–27	25–20		92–92	
19 Feb	17:30	Aluron CMC Warta Zawiercie	1–3	Jastrzębski Węgiel	25–16	18–25	18–25	17–25		78–91	
20 Feb	14:45	Ślepsk Malow Suwałki	0–3	ZAKSA Kędzierzyn-Koźle	22–25	21–25	21–25			64–75	
20 Feb	17:30	Trefl Gdańsk	3–0	Projekt Warsaw	25–16	25–22	25–23			75–61	
19 Feb	14:45	Asseco Resovia	2–3	PGE Skra Bełchatów	21–25	25–21	19–25	25–18	12–15	102–104	

=== 22nd round ===
Date	Time		Score		Set 1	Set 2	Set 3	Set 4	Set 5	Total	Report
4 Mar	20:30	LUK Lublin	1–3	Asseco Resovia	18–25	23–25	26–24	15–25		82–99	
6 Mar	14:45	PGE Skra Bełchatów	3–2	Trefl Gdańsk	25–20	25–20	23–25	21–25	15–11	109–101	
5 Mar	17:30	Projekt Warsaw	3–1	Ślepsk Malow Suwałki	25–21	25–21	20–25	25–23		95–90	
5 Mar	14:45	ZAKSA Kędzierzyn-Koźle	3–0	Aluron CMC Warta Zawiercie	26–24	35–33	27–25			88–82	
5 Mar	20:30	Jastrzębski Węgiel	3–2	GKS Katowice	25–23	25–18	22–25	32–34	15–12	119–112	
7 Mar	17:30	PSG Stal Nysa	3–1	Indykpol AZS Olsztyn	23–25	25–21	25–21	25–16		98–83	
6 Mar	17:30	Cerrad Enea Czarni Radom	2–3	Cuprum Lubin	25–18	25–21	19–25	22–25	13–15	104–104	

=== 23rd round ===
Date	Time		Score		Set 1	Set 2	Set 3	Set 4	Set 5	Total	Report
13 Mar	17:30	Cerrad Enea Czarni Radom	1–3	LUK Lublin	14–25	25–20	22–25	18–25		79–95	
12 Mar	20:30	Cuprum Lubin	3–0	PSG Stal Nysa	27–25	25–20	25–23			77–68	
12 Mar	14:45	Jastrzębski Węgiel	3–1	Indykpol AZS Olsztyn	25–21	22–25	25–20	25–23		97–89	
12 Mar	17:30	GKS Katowice	0–3	ZAKSA Kędzierzyn-Koźle	18–25	17–25	20–25			55–75	
13 Mar	14:45	Aluron CMC Warta Zawiercie	3–1	Projekt Warsaw	25–21	22–25	27–25	25–22		99–93	
11 Mar	17:30	Ślepsk Malow Suwałki	0–3	PGE Skra Bełchatów	17–25	22–25	19–25			58–75	
6 Feb	14:45	Trefl Gdańsk	3–2	Asseco Resovia	20–25	25–19	25–19	18–25	15–13	103–101	

=== 24th round ===
Date	Time		Score		Set 1	Set 2	Set 3	Set 4	Set 5	Total	Report
19 Mar	17:30	LUK Lublin	1–3	Trefl Gdańsk	25–19	23–25	20–25	23–25		91–94	
18 Mar	20:30	Asseco Resovia	1–3	Ślepsk Malow Suwałki	23–25	27–25	25–27	27–29		102–106	
19 Mar	14:45	PGE Skra Bełchatów	3–2	Aluron CMC Warta Zawiercie	25–23	20–25	25–21	23–25	15–10	108–104	
18 Mar	17:30	Projekt Warsaw	0–3	GKS Katowice	22–25	23–25	21–25			66–75	
20 Mar	14:45	Indykpol AZS Olsztyn	0–3	ZAKSA Kędzierzyn-Koźle	28–30	18–25	20–25			66–80	
20 Mar	20:30	Jastrzębski Węgiel	3–1	Cuprum Lubin	25–22	18–25	25–19	25–21		93–87	
19 Mar	20:30	PSG Stal Nysa	3–1	Cerrad Enea Czarni Radom	28–26	23–25	25–12	25–13		101–76	

=== 25th round ===
Date	Time		Score		Set 1	Set 2	Set 3	Set 4	Set 5	Total	Report
28 Mar	20:30	PSG Stal Nysa	3–0	LUK Lublin	25–18	25–21	30–28			80–67	
27 Mar	20:30	Cerrad Enea Czarni Radom	0–3	Jastrzębski Węgiel	20–25	14–25	16–25			50–75	
26 Mar	20:30	Cuprum Lubin	3–2	ZAKSA Kędzierzyn-Koźle	25–22	19–25	22–25	27–25	15–11	108–108	
28 Mar	17:30	Indykpol AZS Olsztyn	3–0	Projekt Warsaw	25–19	25–21	25–20			75–60	
25 Mar	20:30	GKS Katowice	1–3	PGE Skra Bełchatów	25–21	19–25	21–25	19–25		84–96	
27 Mar	18:00	Aluron CMC Warta Zawiercie	1–3	Asseco Resovia	25–23	20–25	23–25	23–25		91–98	
25 Mar	17:30	Ślepsk Malow Suwałki	2–3	Trefl Gdańsk	25–20	15–25	25–20	20–25	12–15	97–105	

=== 26th round ===
Date	Time		Score		Set 1	Set 2	Set 3	Set 4	Set 5	Total	Report
2 Apr	17:30	Aluron CMC Warta Zawiercie	3–1	LUK Lublin	25–22	25–18	22–25	25–21		97–86	
1 Apr	17:30	Ślepsk Malow Suwałki	2–3	GKS Katowice	21–25	27–25	18–25	25–21	17–19	108–115	
3 Apr	17:30	Trefl Gdańsk	3–0	Indykpol AZS Olsztyn	25–20	25–20	25–20			75–60	
2 Apr	20:30	Asseco Resovia	3–0	Cuprum Lubin	25–19	25–14	25–20			75–53	
2 Apr	14:45	PGE Skra Bełchatów	3–2	Cerrad Enea Czarni Radom	25–23	21–25	19–25	25–23	15–10	105–106	
1 Apr	20:30	Projekt Warsaw	2–3	PSG Stal Nysa	20–25	20–25	25–23	25–20	12–15	102–108	
3 Apr	14:45	Jastrzębski Węgiel	0–3	ZAKSA Kędzierzyn-Koźle	20–25	16–25	15–25			51–75	

== Playoffs ==
Quarterfinals
1	ZAKSA Kędzierzyn-Koźle	2
8	GKS Katowice	0
5	Asseco Resovia	0
4	Aluron CMC Warta Zawiercie	2
3	PGE Skra Bełchatów	2
6	Indykpol AZS Olsztyn	1
7	Trefl Gdańsk	1
2	Jastrzębski Węgiel	2

Semifinals
1	ZAKSA Kędzierzyn-Koźle	2
4	Aluron CMC Warta Zawiercie	1
3	PGE Skra Bełchatów	0
2	Jastrzębski Węgiel	2

Finals
1	ZAKSA Kędzierzyn-Koźle	3
2	Jastrzębski Węgiel	1

=== Quarterfinals ===
- (to 2 victories)

==== Quarterfinal A ====
Date	Time		Score		Set 1	Set 2	Set 3	Set 4	Set 5	Total	Report
13 Apr	20:30	ZAKSA Kędzierzyn-Koźle	3–0	GKS Katowice	25–21	25–12	25–22			75–55	
18 Apr	14:45	GKS Katowice	1–3	ZAKSA Kędzierzyn-Koźle	29–27	19–25	20–25	19–25		87–102	

==== Quarterfinal B ====
Date	Time		Score		Set 1	Set 2	Set 3	Set 4	Set 5	Total	Report
13 Apr	17:30	Jastrzębski Węgiel	2–3	Trefl Gdańsk	28–26	25–18	18–25	21–25	13–15	105–109	
16 Apr	14:45	Trefl Gdańsk	0–3	Jastrzębski Węgiel	23–25	23–25	14–25			60–75	
20 Apr	17:30	Jastrzębski Węgiel	3–0	Trefl Gdańsk	25–17	25–16	25–18			75–51	

==== Quarterfinal C ====
Date	Time		Score		Set 1	Set 2	Set 3	Set 4	Set 5	Total	Report
12 Apr	17:30	PGE Skra Bełchatów	1–3	Indykpol AZS Olsztyn	25–19	24–26	26–28	14–25		89–98	
15 Apr	17:30	Indykpol AZS Olsztyn	0–3	PGE Skra Bełchatów	21–25	13–25	23–25			57–75	
19 Apr	17:30	PGE Skra Bełchatów	3–2	Indykpol AZS Olsztyn	29–27	23–25	25–19	22–25	15–13	114–109	

==== Quarterfinal D ====
Date	Time		Score		Set 1	Set 2	Set 3	Set 4	Set 5	Total	Report
12 Apr	20:30	Aluron CMC Warta Zawiercie	3–1	Asseco Resovia	27–25	24–26	25–20	27–25		103–96	
15 Apr	20:30	Asseco Resovia	1–3	Aluron CMC Warta Zawiercie	25–19	23–25	23–25	22–25		93–94	

=== Semifinals ===
- (to 2 victories)

==== Semifinal A ====
Date	Time		Score		Set 1	Set 2	Set 3	Set 4	Set 5	Total	Report
23 Apr	14:45	ZAKSA Kędzierzyn-Koźle	1–3	Aluron CMC Warta Zawiercie	25–22	17–25	22–25	23–25		87–97	
26 Apr	17:30	Aluron CMC Warta Zawiercie	0–3	ZAKSA Kędzierzyn-Koźle	20–25	21–25	21–25			62–75	
30 Apr	14:45	ZAKSA Kędzierzyn-Koźle	3–1	Aluron CMC Warta Zawiercie	19–25	25–21	25–19	25–13		94–78	

==== Semifinal B ====
Date	Time		Score		Set 1	Set 2	Set 3	Set 4	Set 5	Total	Report
23 Apr	17:30	Jastrzębski Węgiel	3–0	PGE Skra Bełchatów	25–14	30–28	26–24			81–66	
26 Apr	20:30	PGE Skra Bełchatów	0–3	Jastrzębski Węgiel	18–25	22–25	19–25			59–75	

=== Finals ===
- (to 3 victories)

Date	Time		Score		Set 1	Set 2	Set 3	Set 4	Set 5	Total	Report
4 May	17:30	ZAKSA Kędzierzyn-Koźle	3–0	Jastrzębski Węgiel	25–21	27–25	25–23			77–69	
7 May	14:45	Jastrzębski Węgiel	2–3	ZAKSA Kędzierzyn-Koźle	25–20	16–25	25–22	12–25	16–18	94–110	
11 May	17:30	ZAKSA Kędzierzyn-Koźle	1–3	Jastrzębski Węgiel	24–26	25–20	23–25	22–25		94–96	
14 May	14:45	Jastrzębski Węgiel	0–3	ZAKSA Kędzierzyn-Koźle	23–25	17–25	21–25			61–75	

== Placement matches ==
=== 11th place ===
- (to 2 victories)

Date	Time		Score		Set 1	Set 2	Set 3	Set 4	Set 5	Total	Report
14 Apr	20:30	Ślepsk Malow Suwałki	2–3	LUK Lublin	25–23	25–18	18–25	19–25	13–15	100–106	
20 Apr	20:30	LUK Lublin	3–2	Ślepsk Malow Suwałki	25–21	25–14	26–28	15–25	15–11	106–99	

=== 9th place ===
- (to 2 victories)

Date	Time		Score		Set 1	Set 2	Set 3	Set 4	Set 5	Total	Report
14 Apr	17:30	Cuprum Lubin	0–3	Projekt Warsaw	18–25	21–25	16–25			55–75	
22 Apr	20:30	Projekt Warsaw	3–2	Cuprum Lubin	25–21	22–25	18–25	25–15	16–14	106–100	

=== 7th place ===
- (to 2 victories)

Date	Time		Score		Set 1	Set 2	Set 3	Set 4	Set 5	Total	Report
23 Apr	20:30	GKS Katowice	2–3	Trefl Gdańsk	23–25	18–25	25–13	25–22	10–15	101–100	
27 Apr	20:30	Trefl Gdańsk	3–0	GKS Katowice	25–18	25–23	25–18			75–59	

=== 5th place ===
- (to 2 victories)

Date	Time		Score		Set 1	Set 2	Set 3	Set 4	Set 5	Total	Report
24 Apr	14:45	Indykpol AZS Olsztyn	1–3	Asseco Resovia	21–25	25–20	16–25	23–25		85–95	
27 Apr	17:30	Asseco Resovia	1–3	Indykpol AZS Olsztyn	23–25	22–25	25–19	19–25		89–94	
Golden set		Asseco Resovia	15–10	Indykpol AZS Olsztyn							

=== 3rd place ===
- (to 3 victories)

Date	Time		Score		Set 1	Set 2	Set 3	Set 4	Set 5	Total	Report
4 May	20:30	PGE Skra Bełchatów	2–3	Aluron CMC Warta Zawiercie	23–25	25–21	25–19	23–25	15–17	111–107	
7 May	17:30	Aluron CMC Warta Zawiercie	2–3	PGE Skra Bełchatów	22–25	25–16	23–25	27–25	13–15	110–106	
10 May	17:30	PGE Skra Bełchatów	0–3	Aluron CMC Warta Zawiercie	22–25	23–25	21–25			66–75	
13 May	20:30	Aluron CMC Warta Zawiercie	3–2	PGE Skra Bełchatów	25–21	21–25	25–16	20–25	15–11	106–98	

== Final standings ==
Qualified for the 2022–23 CEV Champions League
Qualified for the 2022–23 CEV Cup

Rank	Team
1st place, gold medalist(s)	ZAKSA Kędzierzyn-Koźle
2nd place, silver medalist(s)	Jastrzębski Węgiel
3rd place, bronze medalist(s)	Aluron CMC Warta Zawiercie
4	PGE Skra Bełchatów
5	Asseco Resovia
6	Indykpol AZS Olsztyn
7	Trefl Gdańsk
8	GKS Katowice
9	Projekt Warsaw
10	Cuprum Lubin
11	LUK Lublin
12	Ślepsk Malow Suwałki
13	Cerrad Enea Czarni Radom
14	PSG Stal Nysa

2022 Polish champions

9th title

== Squads ==
Aluron CMC Warta Zawiercie
No.	Name	Date of birth	Height	Position
1	(Poland) Dawid Konarski	31 August 1989	1.98 m (6 ft 6 in)	opposite
3	(Poland) Michał Żurek	3 June 1988	1.81 m (5 ft 11 in)	libero
5	(Poland) Miłosz Zniszczoł	2 July 1986	2.01 m (6 ft 7 in)	middle blocker
6	(Poland) Mateusz Malinowski	6 May 1992	1.98 m (6 ft 6 in)	opposite
7	(Argentina) Facundo Conte	25 August 1989	1.97 m (6 ft 6 in)	outside hitter
9	(Poland) Patryk Niemiec	18 February 1997	2.02 m (6 ft 8 in)	middle blocker
13	(Poland) Dominik Depowski	27 October 1995	2.00 m (6 ft 7 in)	outside hitter
14	(Argentina) Maximiliano Cavanna	2 July 1988	1.88 m (6 ft 2 in)	setter
15	(Portugal) Miguel Tavares	2 March 1993	1.92 m (6 ft 4 in)	setter
16	(Poland) Bartosz Makoś	1 August 1998	1.76 m (5 ft 9 in)	libero
17	(Poland) Piotr Orczyk	19 March 1993	1.98 m (6 ft 6 in)	outside hitter
20	(Poland) Wiktor Rajsner	13 April 1999	2.05 m (6 ft 9 in)	middle blocker
25	(Poland) Michał Szalacha	15 January 1994	2.02 m (6 ft 8 in)	middle blocker
93	(Serbia) Uroš Kovačević	6 May 1993	1.98 m (6 ft 6 in)	outside hitter
Head coach:		(Montenegro) Igor Kolaković		

Asseco Resovia
No.	Name	Date of birth	Height	Position
1	(Poland) Bartłomiej Krulicki	15 September 1993	2.05 m (6 ft 9 in)	middle blocker
2	(Poland) Maciej Muzaj	21 May 1994	2.07 m (6 ft 9 in)	opposite
3	(Belgium) Sam Deroo	29 April 1992	2.03 m (6 ft 8 in)	outside hitter
4	(Slovenia) Jan Kozamernik	24 December 1995	2.05 m (6 ft 9 in)	middle blocker
5	(Poland) Jakub Bucki	13 August 1988	1.97 m (6 ft 6 in)	opposite
7	(Poland) Jakub Kochanowski	17 July 1997	1.99 m (6 ft 6 in)	middle blocker
9	(Poland) Nicolas Szerszeń	31 December 1996	1.95 m (6 ft 5 in)	outside hitter
11	(Poland) Fabian Drzyzga	3 January 1990	1.96 m (6 ft 5 in)	setter
12	(Poland) Paweł Woicki	19 June 1983	1.82 m (6 ft 0 in)	setter
13	(Poland) Michał Potera	6 March 1988	1.83 m (6 ft 0 in)	libero
14	(Poland) Rafał Buszek	28 April 1987	1.96 m (6 ft 5 in)	outside hitter
16	(Poland) Paweł Zatorski	21 June 1990	1.84 m (6 ft 0 in)	libero
18	(Slovenia) Klemen Čebulj	21 February 1992	2.02 m (6 ft 8 in)	outside hitter
84	(Estonia) Timo Tammemaa	18 November 1991	2.04 m (6 ft 8 in)	middle blocker
Head coach:		(Italy) Alberto Giuliani → (Argentina) Marcelo Méndez		

Cerrad Enea Czarni Radom
No.	Name	Date of birth	Height	Position
1	(Poland) Jakub Sadkowski	25 February 2002	2.08 m (6 ft 10 in)	middle blocker
2	(Poland) Michał Ostrowski	29 March 1990	2.03 m (6 ft 8 in)	middle blocker
3	(Poland) Michał Kędzierski	9 August 1994	1.94 m (6 ft 4 in)	setter
5	(Russia) Alexander Voropaev	19 October 1993	1.98 m (6 ft 6 in)	setter
7	(Poland) Bartłomiej Lemański	19 March 1996	2.16 m (7 ft 1 in)	middle blocker
8	(Poland) Paweł Rusin	5 March 1992	1.82 m (6 ft 0 in)	outside hitter
9	(Poland) Daniel Gąsior	9 January 1995	2.00 m (6 ft 7 in)	opposite
11	(Poland) Sebastian Warda	18 January 1989	2.04 m (6 ft 8 in)	middle blocker
12	(Austria) Alexander Berger	27 September 1988	1.93 m (6 ft 4 in)	outside hitter
13	(Poland) Mateusz Masłowski	13 June 1997	1.85 m (6 ft 1 in)	libero
16	(Poland) Rafał Faryna	28 September 1994	2.00 m (6 ft 7 in)	opposite
17	(Poland) Bartosz Firszt	19 March 1999	1.98 m (6 ft 6 in)	outside hitter
18	(Poland) Maciej Nowowsiak	20 September 2001	1.88 m (6 ft 2 in)	libero
19	(Brazil) José Ademar Santana	6 February 1996	1.98 m (6 ft 6 in)	outside hitter
23	(Netherlands) Michaël Parkinson	23 November 1991	2.03 m (6 ft 8 in)	middle blocker
33	(Poland) Wiktor Nowak	21 May 1999	1.86 m (6 ft 1 in)	setter
Head coach:		(Poland) Jakub Bednaruk		

Cuprum Lubin
No.	Name	Date of birth	Height	Position
1	(Poland) Marcin Waliński	24 October 1990	1.95 m (6 ft 5 in)	outside hitter
2	(Poland) Kamil Maruszczyk	13 January 1993	1.91 m (6 ft 3 in)	outside hitter
3	(Poland) Maciej Sas	1 January 1900	1.82 m (6 ft 0 in)	libero
4	(Poland) Dawid Gunia	1 January 1987	2.03 m (6 ft 8 in)	middle blocker
5	(Poland) Wojciech Ferens	5 April 1991	1.94 m (6 ft 4 in)	outside hitter
6	(Poland) Grzegorz Bociek	6 June 1991	2.07 m (6 ft 9 in)	opposite
9	(Poland) Paweł Pietraszko	5 October 1990	2.03 m (6 ft 8 in)	middle blocker
10	(Poland) Remigiusz Kapica	28 September 2000	1.99 m (6 ft 6 in)	opposite
11	(Japan) Masahiro Sekita	20 November 1993	1.75 m (5 ft 9 in)	setter
12	(Germany) Florian Krage	11 January 1997	2.04 m (6 ft 8 in)	middle blocker
14	(Poland) Michał Gierżot	4 October 2001	2.03 m (6 ft 8 in)	outside hitter
16	(Poland) Jędrzej Kaźmierczak	23 September 2000	1.99 m (6 ft 6 in)	middle blocker
20	(Poland) Kamil Szymura	24 January 1999	1.85 m (6 ft 1 in)	libero
94	(Poland) Przemysław Stępień	7 February 1994	1.85 m (6 ft 1 in)	setter
Head coach:		(Poland) Paweł Rusek		

GKS Katowice
No.	Name	Date of birth	Height	Position
1	(Poland) Kamil Drzazga	11 September 2000	2.10 m (6 ft 11 in)	middle blocker
2	(Poland) Jakub Szymański	25 March 1998	2.00 m (6 ft 7 in)	outside hitter
4	(Poland) Bartosz Mariański	26 May 1992	1.87 m (6 ft 2 in)	libero
5	(Poland) Damian Kogut	3 January 1997	1.91 m (6 ft 3 in)	outside hitter
7	(Poland) Jakub Jarosz	10 February 1987	1.97 m (6 ft 6 in)	opposite
8	(Poland) Jakub Lewandowski	16 July 1996	2.03 m (6 ft 8 in)	middle blocker
9	(Poland) Marcin Kania	14 February 1996	2.03 m (6 ft 8 in)	middle blocker
11	(Poland) Jakub Nowosielski	11 February 1993	1.93 m (6 ft 4 in)	setter
13	(United States) Micah Maʻa	16 April 1997	1.92 m (6 ft 4 in)	setter
14	(Belgium) Tomas Rousseaux	31 March 1994	1.99 m (6 ft 6 in)	outside hitter
16	(Poland) Piotr Hain	26 February 1991	2.07 m (6 ft 9 in)	middle blocker
18	(Poland) Damian Domagała	23 April 1998	1.99 m (6 ft 6 in)	opposite
19	(Argentina) Gonzalo Quiroga	25 February 1993	1.92 m (6 ft 4 in)	outside hitter
23	(Poland) Dawid Ogórek	30 July 1990	1.84 m (6 ft 0 in)	libero
Head coach:		(Poland) Grzegorz Słaby		

Indykpol AZS Olsztyn
No.	Name	Date of birth	Height	Position
1	(Poland) Karol Jankiewicz	21 February 1996	1.85 m (6 ft 1 in)	setter
3	(Poland) Jędrzej Gruszczyński	13 November 1997	1.86 m (6 ft 1 in)	libero
4	(Poland) Jan Król	23 August 1989	1.98 m (6 ft 6 in)	opposite
5	(Poland) Jan Firlej	26 September 1996	1.88 m (6 ft 2 in)	setter
6	(Netherlands) Robbert Andringa	28 April 1990	1.91 m (6 ft 3 in)	outside hitter
7	(Poland) Dawid Siwczyk	13 June 1993	1.93 m (6 ft 4 in)	middle blocker
9	(Poland) Szymon Jakubiszak	13 February 1998	2.08 m (6 ft 10 in)	middle blocker
10	(Iran) Meisam Salehi	17 November 1998	1.98 m (6 ft 6 in)	outside hitter
11	(United States) Torey DeFalco	10 April 1997	1.98 m (6 ft 6 in)	outside hitter
13	(United States) Taylor Averill	5 March 1992	2.01 m (6 ft 7 in)	middle blocker
15	(Poland) Jakub Ciunajtis	6 August 1998	1.77 m (5 ft 10 in)	libero
16	(Poland) Mateusz Poręba	24 August 1999	2.04 m (6 ft 8 in)	middle blocker
17	(Albania) Redi Bakiri	22 July 2000	1.94 m (6 ft 4 in)	outside hitter
18	(Poland) Wiktor Janiszewski	1 March 2002	1.94 m (6 ft 4 in)	outside hitter
21	(Poland) Karol Butryn	18 June 1993	1.94 m (6 ft 4 in)	opposite
Head coach:		(Italy) Marco Bonitta → (Argentina) Javier Weber		

Jastrzębski Węgiel
No.	Name	Date of birth	Height	Position
1	(Poland) Dawid Dryja	21 July 1992	2.01 m (6 ft 7 in)	middle blocker
2	(Czech Republic) Jan Hadrava	3 June 1991	1.99 m (6 ft 6 in)	opposite
3	(Poland) Jakub Popiwczak	17 April 1996	1.80 m (5 ft 11 in)	libero
6	(France) Benjamin Toniutti	30 October 1989	1.83 m (6 ft 0 in)	setter
7	(Hungary) Árpád Baróti	23 October 1991	2.06 m (6 ft 9 in)	opposite
8	(France) Stéphen Boyer	10 April 1996	1.96 m (6 ft 5 in)	opposite
9	(Poland) Łukasz Wiśniewski	3 February 1989	1.98 m (6 ft 6 in)	middle blocker
13	(Poland) Yuriy Gladyr	8 July 1984	2.02 m (6 ft 8 in)	middle blocker
14	(Finland) Eemi Tervaportti	26 July 1989	1.93 m (6 ft 4 in)	setter
16	(Poland) Bartosz Cedzyński	20 December 1990	2.11 m (6 ft 11 in)	middle blocker
17	(France) Trévor Clévenot	28 June 1994	1.99 m (6 ft 6 in)	outside hitter
20	(Poland) Wojciech Szwed	7 March 2000	1.98 m (6 ft 6 in)	outside hitter
21	(Poland) Tomasz Fornal	31 August 1997	2.00 m (6 ft 7 in)	outside hitter
24	(Poland) Szymon Biniek	30 July 1995	1.88 m (6 ft 2 in)	libero
26	(Poland) Rafał Szymura	29 August 1995	1.97 m (6 ft 6 in)	outside hitter
95	(Poland) Jakub Macyra	22 July 1995	2.02 m (6 ft 8 in)	middle blocker
Head coach:		(Italy) Andrea Gardini		

LUK Lublin
No.	Name	Date of birth	Height	Position
1	(Poland) Jan Nowakowski	17 May 1994	2.02 m (6 ft 8 in)	middle blocker
5	(Poland) Jakub Strulak	12 May 2001	2.10 m (6 ft 11 in)	middle blocker
7	(Poland) Jakub Wachnik	16 February 1993	2.02 m (6 ft 8 in)	outside hitter
8	(Serbia) Milan Katić	22 October 1993	2.01 m (6 ft 7 in)	outside hitter
9	(Poland) Bartosz Filipiak	27 February 1994	1.97 m (6 ft 6 in)	opposite
10	(Poland) Szymon Romać	1 October 1992	1.96 m (6 ft 5 in)	opposite
11	(Poland) Wojciech Sobala	12 May 1988	2.07 m (6 ft 9 in)	middle blocker
13	(Poland) Mateusz Jóźwik	30 May 1996	1.95 m (6 ft 5 in)	outside hitter
14	(Poland) Grzegorz Pająk	1 January 1987	1.96 m (6 ft 5 in)	setter
16	(Poland) Konrad Stajer	30 May 1994	1.98 m (6 ft 6 in)	middle blocker
17	(Poland) Szymon Gregorowicz	7 March 1994	1.83 m (6 ft 0 in)	libero
18	(Poland) Szymon Bereza	7 April 1998	1.88 m (6 ft 2 in)	setter
21	(United States) Dustin Watten	27 October 1986	1.83 m (6 ft 0 in)	libero
42	(Poland) Igor Gniecki	16 April 2002	1.93 m (6 ft 4 in)	setter
90	(Poland) Wojciech Włodarczyk	28 October 1990	2.00 m (6 ft 7 in)	outside hitter
92	(Poland) Jakub Peszko	1 April 1992	1.93 m (6 ft 4 in)	outside hitter
Head coach:		(Poland) Dariusz Daszkiewicz		

PGE Skra Bełchatów
No.	Name	Date of birth	Height	Position
6	(Poland) Karol Kłos	8 August 1989	2.01 m (6 ft 7 in)	middle blocker
7	(Poland) Damian Schulz	26 February 1990	2.08 m (6 ft 10 in)	opposite
8	(Italy) Dick Kooy	3 December 1987	2.02 m (6 ft 8 in)	outside hitter
9	(Estonia) Robert Täht	15 August 1993	1.91 m (6 ft 3 in)	outside hitter
11	(Iran) Milad Ebadipour	17 October 1993	1.96 m (6 ft 5 in)	outside hitter
14	(Serbia) Aleksandar Atanasijević	4 September 1991	2.02 m (6 ft 8 in)	opposite
15	(Poland) Grzegorz Łomacz	1 October 1987	1.88 m (6 ft 2 in)	setter
16	(Poland) Kacper Piechocki	17 December 1995	1.85 m (6 ft 1 in)	libero
17	(Poland) Sebastian Adamczyk	28 February 1999	2.08 m (6 ft 10 in)	middle blocker
18	(Poland) Robert Milczarek	28 November 1983	1.88 m (6 ft 2 in)	libero
20	(Poland) Mateusz Bieniek	5 April 1994	2.08 m (6 ft 10 in)	middle blocker
26	(Serbia) Mihajlo Mitić	17 September 1990	2.01 m (6 ft 7 in)	setter
55	(Poland) Mikołaj Sawicki	23 November 1999	1.98 m (6 ft 6 in)	outside hitter
Head coach:		(Serbia) Slobodan Kovač		

Projekt Warsaw
No.	Name	Date of birth	Height	Position
1	(Poland) Jakub Kowalczyk	26 June 1986	2.00 m (6 ft 7 in)	middle blocker
2	(Poland) Bartosz Kwolek	17 July 1997	1.93 m (6 ft 4 in)	outside hitter
7	(Spain) Ángel Trinidad	27 March 1993	1.95 m (6 ft 5 in)	setter
8	(Poland) Andrzej Wrona	27 December 1988	2.06 m (6 ft 9 in)	middle blocker
9	(Canada) Jay Blankenau	27 September 1989	1.94 m (6 ft 4 in)	setter
10	(Poland) Janusz Gałązka	26 April 1987	1.99 m (6 ft 6 in)	middle blocker
11	(Poland) Piotr Nowakowski	18 December 1987	2.05 m (6 ft 9 in)	middle blocker
12	(Serbia) Dušan Petković	27 January 1992	2.02 m (6 ft 8 in)	opposite
13	(Belgium) Igor Grobelny	8 June 1993	1.94 m (6 ft 4 in)	outside hitter
14	(Poland) Michał Superlak	16 November 1993	2.06 m (6 ft 9 in)	opposite
15	(Poland) Artur Szalpuk	20 March 1995	2.02 m (6 ft 8 in)	outside hitter
17	(Poland) Mateusz Janikowski	5 May 1999	2.01 m (6 ft 7 in)	outside hitter
18	(Poland) Damian Wojtaszek	7 September 1988	1.80 m (5 ft 11 in)	libero
19	(Poland) Dominik Jaglarski	20 June 1997	1.87 m (6 ft 2 in)	libero
23	(Poland) Jan Fornal	14 January 1995	1.91 m (6 ft 3 in)	outside hitter
Head coach:		(Italy) Andrea Anastasi		

PSG Stal Nysa
No.	Name	Date of birth	Height	Position
1	(Poland) Maciej Zajder	31 January 1988	2.02 m (6 ft 8 in)	middle blocker
2	(Poland) Patryk Szwaradzki	27 June 1995	1.95 m (6 ft 5 in)	opposite
3	(Poland) Kamil Dębski	17 October 1997	1.98 m (6 ft 6 in)	outside hitter
4	(Poland) Marcin Komenda	24 May 1996	1.98 m (6 ft 6 in)	setter
5	(United States) Mitchell Stahl	31 August 1994	2.03 m (6 ft 8 in)	middle blocker
6	(Morocco) Zouheir El Graoui	1 July 1994	1.97 m (6 ft 6 in)	outside hitter
8	(Poland) Bartosz Bućko	6 January 1995	1.95 m (6 ft 5 in)	outside hitter
9	(Poland) Dominik Kramczyński	13 January 2001	2.02 m (6 ft 8 in)	middle blocker
10	(Tunisia) Wassim Ben Tara	3 August 1996	2.04 m (6 ft 8 in)	opposite
11	(Poland) Moustapha M'Baye	22 January 1992	1.98 m (6 ft 6 in)	middle blocker
15	(Poland) Kamil Kwasowski	13 September 1990	1.97 m (6 ft 6 in)	outside hitter
16	(Poland) Kamil Dembiec	7 February 1992	1.78 m (5 ft 10 in)	libero
17	(Poland) Michał Ruciak	22 August 1983	1.90 m (6 ft 3 in)	libero
22	(Bulgaria) Nikolay Penchev	22 May 1992	1.97 m (6 ft 6 in)	outside hitter
44	(Poland) Mariusz Schamlewski	16 January 1991	1.98 m (6 ft 6 in)	middle blocker
91	(Poland) Patryk Szczurek	6 February 1991	1.93 m (6 ft 4 in)	setter
Head coach:		(Poland) Krzysztof Stelmach → (Poland) Daniel Pliński		

Ślepsk Malow Suwałki
No.	Name	Date of birth	Height	Position
3	(Poland) Mateusz Laskowski	9 September 1998	1.96 m (6 ft 5 in)	outside hitter
6	(Poland) Piotr Łukasik	11 July 1994	2.08 m (6 ft 10 in)	outside hitter
7	(Poland) Łukasz Makowski	21 February 1989	1.87 m (6 ft 2 in)	setter
8	(Belgium) Kevin Klinkenberg	4 October 1990	1.97 m (6 ft 6 in)	outside hitter
9	(Poland) Jakub Ziobrowski	23 January 1997	2.02 m (6 ft 8 in)	opposite
10	(Poland) Bartłomiej Bołądź	28 September 1994	2.04 m (6 ft 8 in)	opposite
11	(Norway) Andreas Takvam	4 June 1993	2.01 m (6 ft 7 in)	middle blocker
12	(Poland) Łukasz Rudzewicz	25 January 1985	1.98 m (6 ft 6 in)	middle blocker
13	(Poland) Adrian Buchowski	30 September 1991	1.94 m (6 ft 4 in)	outside hitter
14	(Poland) Cezary Sapiński	28 September 1994	2.03 m (6 ft 8 in)	middle blocker
16	(Poland) Paweł Filipowicz	7 May 1992	1.89 m (6 ft 2 in)	libero
18	(Poland) Paweł Halaba	14 December 1995	1.94 m (6 ft 4 in)	outside hitter
22	(Poland) Przemysław Smoliński	27 November 1992	2.01 m (6 ft 7 in)	middle blocker
24	(Poland) Mateusz Czunkiewicz	16 December 1996	1.83 m (6 ft 0 in)	libero
91	(United States) Joshua Tuaniga	18 March 1997	1.91 m (6 ft 3 in)	setter
Head coach:		(Poland) Andrzej Kowal → (Poland) Dominik Kwapisiewicz		

Trefl Gdańsk
No.	Name	Date of birth	Height	Position
1	(Poland) Bartłomiej Lipiński	16 November 1996	2.01 m (6 ft 7 in)	outside hitter
2	(Poland) Mariusz Wlazły	4 August 1983	1.94 m (6 ft 4 in)	opposite
4	(Poland) Łukasz Kozub	3 November 1997	1.86 m (6 ft 1 in)	setter
7	(Poland) Dawid Pruszkowski	20 January 2001	1.75 m (5 ft 9 in)	libero
9	(Poland) Kewin Sasak	20 February 1997	2.08 m (6 ft 10 in)	opposite
10	(Germany) Moritz Reichert	15 March 1995	1.95 m (6 ft 5 in)	outside hitter
11	(Germany) Lukas Kampa	29 November 1986	1.93 m (6 ft 4 in)	setter
12	(Poland) Karol Urbanowicz	24 February 2001	2.00 m (6 ft 7 in)	middle blocker
14	(Poland) Maciej Olenderek	16 October 1992	1.78 m (5 ft 10 in)	libero
15	(Poland) Mateusz Mika	21 January 1991	2.06 m (6 ft 9 in)	outside hitter
17	(Poland) Bartłomiej Mordyl	21 January 1995	2.01 m (6 ft 7 in)	middle blocker
18	(Argentina) Pablo Crer	12 June 1989	2.05 m (6 ft 9 in)	middle blocker
19	(Ukraine) Dmytro Pashytskyy	29 November 1987	2.05 m (6 ft 9 in)	middle blocker
23	(Poland) Jordan Zaleszczyk	23 April 2002	2.03 m (6 ft 8 in)	middle blocker
99	(Poland) Patryk Łaba	30 July 1991	1.88 m (6 ft 2 in)	outside hitter
Head coach:		(Poland) Michał Winiarski		

ZAKSA Kędzierzyn-Koźle
No.	Name	Date of birth	Height	Position
2	(Poland) Łukasz Kaczmarek	29 June 1994	2.04 m (6 ft 8 in)	opposite
4	(Poland) Krzysztof Rejno	22 February 1993	2.03 m (6 ft 8 in)	middle blocker
5	(Poland) Marcin Janusz	31 July 1994	1.95 m (6 ft 5 in)	setter
8	(Poland) Adrian Staszewski	31 May 1990	1.98 m (6 ft 6 in)	outside hitter
9	(Poland) Bartłomiej Kluth	20 December 1992	2.10 m (6 ft 11 in)	opposite
11	(Poland) Aleksander Śliwka	24 May 1995	1.97 m (6 ft 6 in)	outside hitter
13	(Poland) Kamil Semeniuk	16 July 1996	1.94 m (6 ft 4 in)	outside hitter
15	(United States) David Smith	15 May 1985	2.01 m (6 ft 7 in)	middle blocker
16	(Poland) Tomasz Kalembka	30 June 1991	2.05 m (6 ft 9 in)	middle blocker
18	(Poland) Michał Kozłowski	16 February 1985	1.91 m (6 ft 3 in)	setter
21	(Poland) Wojciech Żaliński	8 January 1988	1.96 m (6 ft 5 in)	outside hitter
22	(United States) Erik Shoji	24 August 1989	1.83 m (6 ft 0 in)	libero
71	(Poland) Korneliusz Banach	25 January 1994	1.84 m (6 ft 0 in)	libero
99	(Poland) Norbert Huber	14 August 1998	2.07 m (6 ft 9 in)	middle blocker
Head coach:		(Romania) Gheorghe Crețu		

== See also ==
- 2021–22 CEV Champions League
- 2021–22 CEV Cup
