= Stal Nysa =

Polish volleyball club

PSG Stal Nysa
- Full name: Stal Nysa Spółka Akcyjna
- Short name: Stal Nysa
- Founded: 1948
- Ground: Hala Nysa ul. Sudecka 23; 48–300 Nysa (Capacity: 2,505)
- Chairman: Robert Prygiel
- Manager: Francesco Petrella
- Captain: Zouheir El Graoui
- 2024–25: 14th place
- Website: Club home page

Uniforms
Home	Away

Stal Nysa SA is a Polish professional men's volleyball team based in Nysa, founded in 1948.

== Honours ==
- Polish Cup

Winners (1): 1995–96

== Team ==
As of 2024–25 season

=== Coaching staff ===
Occupation	Name
Head coach	(Poland) Daniel Pliński
Assistant coach	(Poland) Michał Róg
Assistant coach	(Poland) Piotr Łuka

=== Players ===
No.	Name	Date of birth	Position
1	(Morocco) Zouheir El Graoui	July 1, 1994 (age 31)	outside hitter
2	(France) Kellian Motta Paes	March 24, 2002 (age 23)	setter
6	(Poland) Konrad Jankowski	June 29, 2002 (age 23)	middle blocker
8	(Poland) Dominik Kramczyński	January 13, 2001 (age 24)	middle blocker
9	(Poland) Michał Gierżot	October 4, 2001 (age 24)	outside hitter
10	(Poland) Remigiusz Kapica	September 29, 2000 (age 25)	opposite
12	(Argentina) Nicolás Zerba	June 13, 1999 (age 26)	middle blocker
14	(Poland) Jakub Abramowicz	April 10, 1998 (age 27)	middle blocker
18	(Poland) Jakub Olejniczak	June 2, 2007 (age 18)	libero
19	(Poland) Dawid Dulski	November 1, 2002 (age 22)	opposite
20	(Poland) Kamil Szymura	January 29, 1999 (age 26)	libero
66	(Poland) Kamil Kosiba	October 31, 1999 (age 25)	outside hitter
90	(Poland) Wojciech Włodarczyk	October 28, 1990 (age 34)	outside hitter
91	(Poland) Patryk Szczurek	February 6, 1991 (age 34)	setter

Roster of Season 2023/2024
No.	Name	Date of birth	Position
1	(Morocco) Zouheir El Graoui	July 1, 1994 (age 31)	outside hitter
2	(Poland) Maciej Muzaj	May 21, 1994 (age 31)	opposite
6	(Poland) Konrad Jankowski	June 29, 2002 (age 23)	middle blocker
8	(Poland) Dominik Kramczyński	January 13, 2001 (age 24)	middle blocker
9	(Poland) Michał Gierżot	October 4, 2001 (age 24)	outside hitter
10	(Poland) Remigiusz Kapica	September 29, 2000 (age 25)	opposite
11	(Croatia) Tsimafei Zhukouski	December 18, 1989 (age 35)	setter
12	(Argentina) Nicolás Zerba	June 13, 1999 (age 26)	middle blocker
14	(Poland) Jakub Abramowicz	April 10, 1998 (age 27)	middle blocker
16	(Poland) Kamil Dembiec	February 7, 1992 (age 33)	libero
20	(Poland) Kamil Szymura	January 29, 1999 (age 26)	libero
66	(Poland) Kamil Kosiba	October 31, 1999 (age 25)	outside hitter
90	(Poland) Wojciech Włodarczyk	October 28, 1990 (age 34)	outside hitter
91	(Poland) Patryk Szczurek	February 6, 1991 (age 34)	setter

Roster of Season 2022/2023
No.	Name	Date of birth	Position
1	(Morocco) Zouheir El Graoui	July 1, 1994 (age 31)	outside hitter
5	(Poland) Rafał Buszek	April 28, 1987 (age 38)	outside hitter
6	(Poland) Konrad Jankowski	June 29, 2002 (age 23)	middle blocker
8	(Poland) Dominik Kramczyński	January 13, 2001 (age 24)	middle blocker
9	(Poland) Michał Gierżot	October 4, 2001 (age 24)	outside hitter
10	(Tunisia) Wassim Ben Tara	August 3, 1996 (age 29)	opposite
11	(Croatia) Tsimafei Zhukouski	December 18, 1989 (age 35)	setter
12	(Argentina) Nicolás Zerba	June 13, 1999 (age 26)	middle blocker
13	(Japan) Kento Miyaura	February 22, 1999 (age 26)	opposite
14	(Poland) Jakub Abramowicz	April 10, 1998 (age 27)	middle blocker
16	(Poland) Kamil Dembiec	February 7, 1992 (age 33)	libero
21	(Poland) Kamil Kwasowski	September 13, 1990 (age 35)	outside hitter
24	(Poland) Szymon Biniek	July 30, 1995 (age 30)	libero
91	(Poland) Patryk Szczurek	February 6, 1991 (age 34)	setter

Roster of Season 2021/2022
No.	Name	Date of birth	Position
1	(Poland) Maciej Zajder	31 January 1988 (age 37)	middle blocker
2	(Poland) Patryk Szwaradzki	27 June 1995 (age 30)	opposite
3	(Poland) Kamil Dębski	17 October 1997 (age 27)	outside hitter
4	(Poland) Marcin Komenda	24 May 1996 (age 29)	setter
6	(Morocco) Zouheir El Graoui	1 July 1994 (age 31)	outside hitter
8	(Poland) Bartosz Bućko	6 January 1995 (age 30)	outside hitter
9	(Poland) Dominik Kramczyński	13 January 2001 (age 24)	middle blocker
10	(Tunisia) Wassim Ben Tara	3 August 1996 (age 29)	opposite
11	(Poland) Moustapha M'Baye	18 September 1992 (age 33)	middle blocker
15	(Poland) Kamil Kwasowski	13 September 1990 (age 35)	outside hitter
16	(Poland) Kamil Dembiec	7 February 1992 (age 33)	libero
17	(Poland) Michał Ruciak	22 August 1983 (age 42)	libero
44	(Poland) Mariusz Schamlewski	16 January 1991 (age 34)	middle blocker
91	(Poland) Patryk Szczurek	6 February 1991 (age 34)	setter

== Former names ==
Years	Name
1948–1990	Stal Nysa
1990–1993	KS Stal Nysa
1993–1998	Stal Hochland Nysa
1998–2000	Citroën Stal Hochland Nysa
2000–2001	KS Citroën Nysa
2001–2002	KS Nysa
2002–2004	NKS Nysa
2004–2017	AZS PWSZ Nysa
2017–2022	Stal Nysa
2022–present	PSG Stal Nysa

== See also ==
- Stal Nysa players
- Stal Nysa coaches
