= Paweł Halaba =

Polish volleyball player (born 1995)

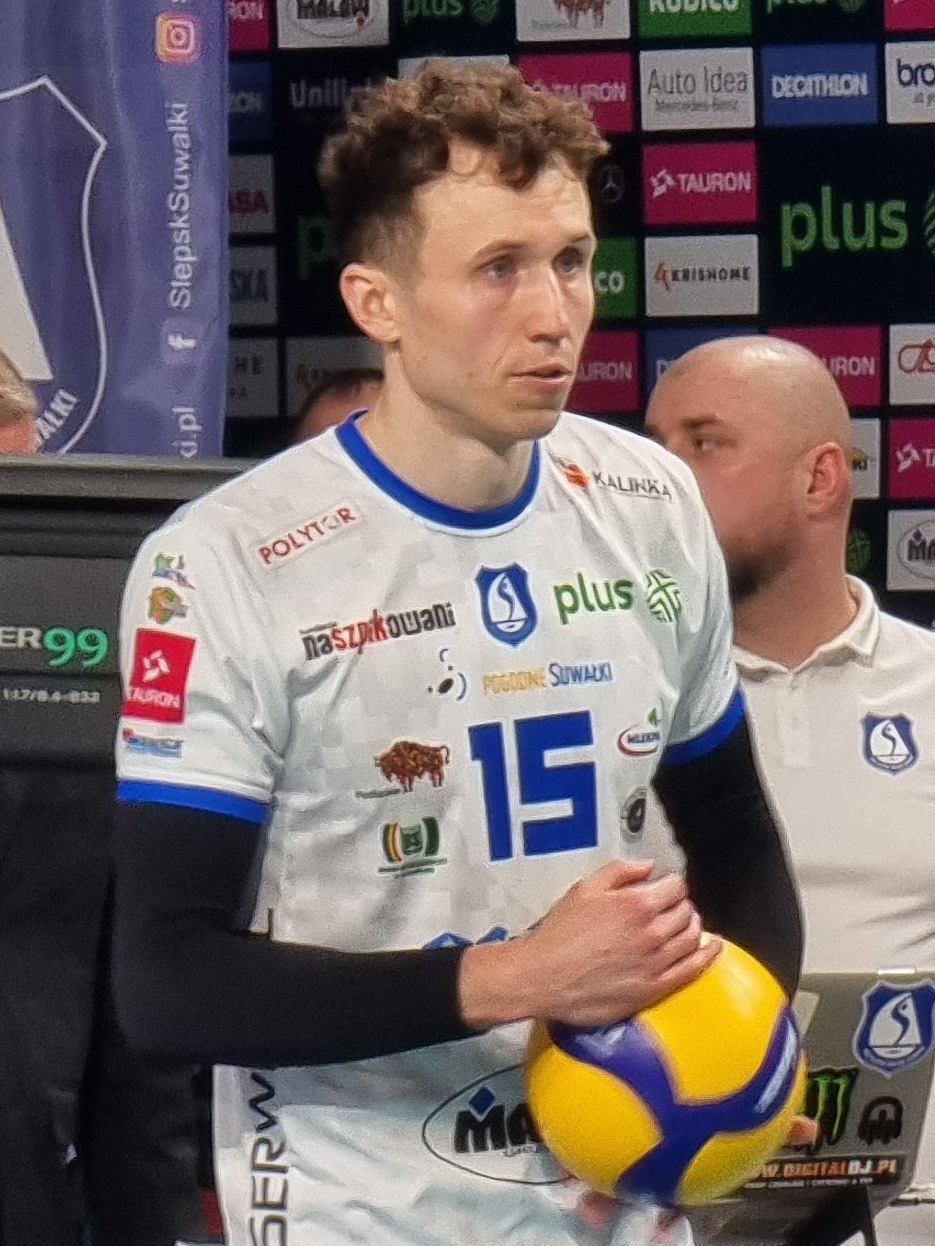

Personal information
- Born: 14 December 1995 (age 30); Płock, Poland
- Height: 1.94 m (6 ft 4 in)
- Weight: 87 kg (192 lb)
- Spike: 354 cm (139 in)

Volleyball information
- Position: Outside hitter
- Current club: AZS Olsztyn
- Number: 15

Career
Years	Teams
2014–2015; 2015–2017; 2017–2018; 2018–2019; 2019–2020; 2020–2021; 2021–2025; 2025–	AZS AGH Kraków; AZS Politechnika Warszawska; VK České Budějovice; Hypo Tirol Alpenvolleys Haching; Trefl Gdańsk; Warta Zawiercie; Ślepsk Suwałki; AZS Olsztyn

Paweł Halaba (born 14 December 1995) is a Polish professional volleyball player who plays as an outside hitter for Indykpol AZS Olsztyn.

== Personal life ==
In 2012, he graduated from the Marshal Stanisław Małachowski High School in Płock. He began studying at AGH University of Science and Technology in Kraków but suspended the studies after one year to continue his volleyball career.

== Career ==
Halaba moved to AZS Politechnika Warszawska in 2015, and made his debut in the Polish PlusLiga.

== Honours ==
=== Universiade ===
- 2019 Summer Universiade
