= Maciej Zajder =

Polish volleyball player

Personal information
- Nationality: (Poland) Polish
- Born: 31 January 1988 (age 38); Łask, Poland
- Height: 2.02 m (6 ft 8 in)
- Weight: 96 kg (212 lb)
- Spike: 345 cm (136 in)
- Block: 325 cm (128 in)

Volleyball information
- Position: Middle blocker
- Current club: (Poland) Stal Nysa
- Number: 1

Career
| Years | Teams |
|---|---|
| 2009–2011; 2011–2013; 2013–2014; 2014–2016; 2016–2017; 2017–2018; 2018– | (Poland) Siatkarz Wieluń (Poland) AZS Politechnika Warszawska (Poland) Trefl Gdańsk (Poland) AZS Olsztyn (Poland) Espadon Szczecin (Poland) Warta Zawiercie (Poland) Stal Nysa |

Maciej Zajder (born 31 January 1988) is a Polish volleyball player. At the professional club level, he plays for the Polish team, Stal Nysa, PlusLiga.

== Career ==
=== Clubs ===
Zajder is an alumnus of Skra Bełchatów. From 2011 to 2013, he was a player of AZS Politechnika Warszawska.

=== National team ===
In 2013 he won, a silver medal of the 2013 Summer Universiade held in Kazan.

== Sporting achievements ==
=== Clubs ===
- CEV Challenge Cup
  - 2011/2012 – with AZS Politechnika Warszawska

=== Universiade ===
- 2013 Summer Universiade
