= Adrian Buchowski =

Polish volleyball player (born 1991)

Personal information
- Nationality: Polish
- Born: 30 September 1991 (age 35); Zielona Góra, Poland
- Height: 1.94 m (6 ft 4 in)
- Weight: 94 kg (207 lb)
- Spike: 347 cm (137 in)

Volleyball information
- Position: Outside hitter
- Current club: Ślepsk Suwałki
- Number: 13

Career
Years	Teams
2010–2011; 2011–2012; 2012–2013; 2013–2016; 2016–2018; 2018–2019; 2019–2021; 2021–	Jastrzębski Węgiel; Siatkarz Wieluń; Ślepsk Suwałki; Effector Kielce; AZS Olsztyn; MKS Będzin; GKS Katowice; Ślepsk Suwałki
Honours
Men's volleyball
Representing Poland
European League
Bronze medal – third place	2015 Poland

Adrian Buchowski (born 30 September 1991) is a Polish professional volleyball player, a bronze medallist at the 2015 European League. At the professional club level, he plays for Ślepsk Malow Suwałki.

== Career ==
=== National team ===
On April 2, 2015 was appointed to the Polish national team by head coach Stephane Antiga. After the training camp in Spała he went to team B of Polish national team led by Andrzej Kowal. He took part in 1st edition of 2015 European Games. On August 14, 2015 he achieved first medal as senior national team player – bronze of European League. His national team won 3rd place match with Estonia (3–0).

== Honours ==
=== Youth national team ===
- 2009 European Youth Olympic Festival

=== Individual awards ===
- 2009: CEV U19 European Championship – Best Scorer
