= Paweł Woicki =

Polish volleyball player and coach

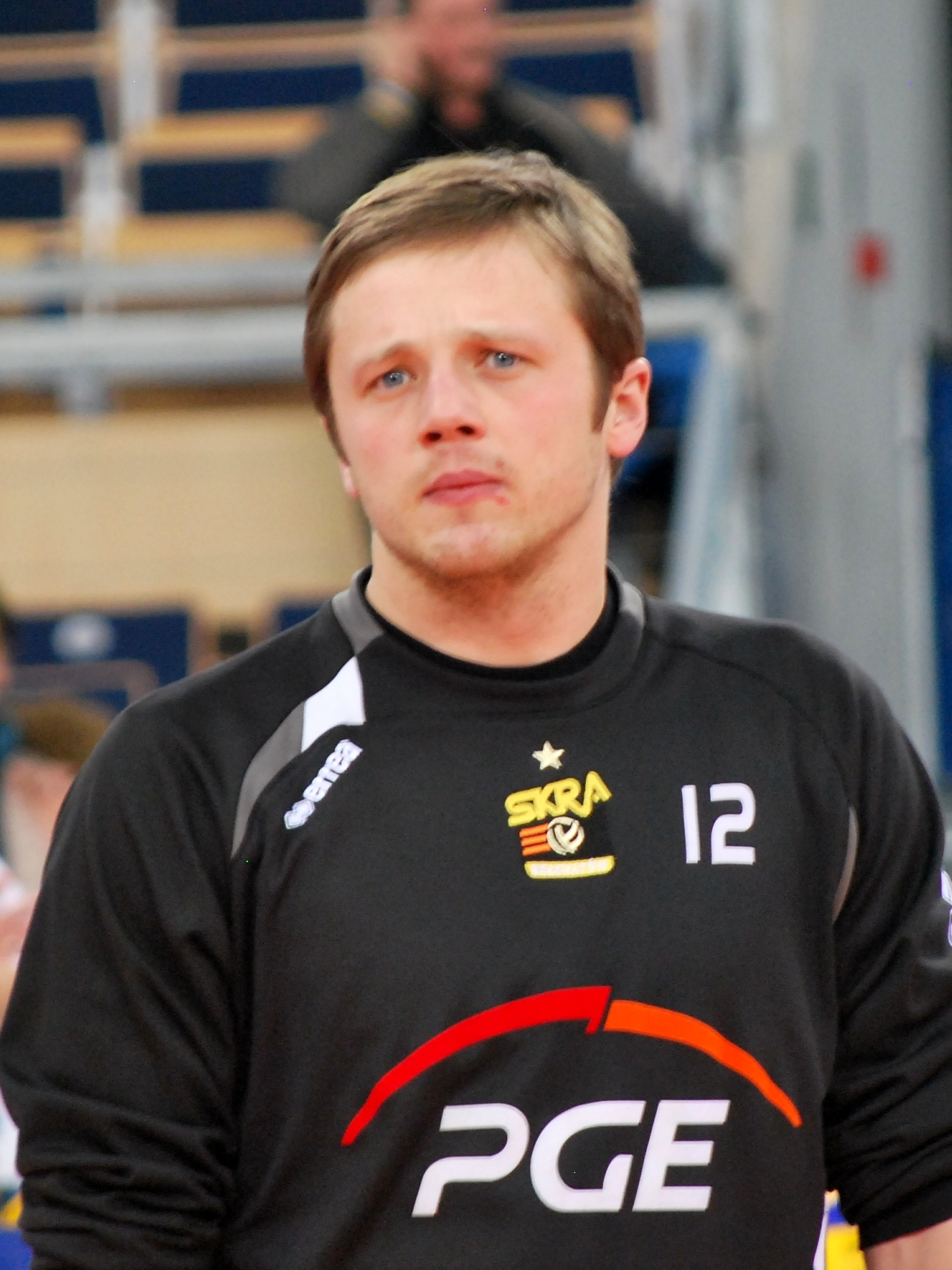

Personal information
- Full name: Paweł Mateusz Woicki
- Nickname: Wujek
- Nationality: Polish
- Born: 19 June 1983 (age 43); Tomaszów Mazowiecki, Poland
- Height: 1.82 m (6 ft 0 in)

Coaching information
Previous teams coached
Years	Teams
2022–2023; 2023	Czarni Radom; Iran (AC)

Volleyball information
- Position: Setter

Career
Years	Teams
2002–2003; 2003–2008; 2008–2009; 2009–2010; 2010–2013; 2013; 2013–2015; 2015–2020; 2020–2022; 2022	AZS Politechnika Warszawska; AZS Częstochowa; Asseco Resovia; Delecta Bydgoszcz; Skra Bełchatów; AZS Politechnika Warszawska; Transfer Bydgoszcz; AZS Olsztyn; Asseco Resovia; Czarni Radom

National team
2005–2016	Poland (102)
Honours
Men's volleyball
Representing Poland
FIVB World League
Bronze medal – third place	2011 Gdańsk
CEV European Championship
Gold medal – first place	2009 Turkey

Paweł Mateusz Woicki (born 19 June 1983) is a Polish professional volleyball coach and former player. He was a member of the Poland national team from 2005 to 2016, a participant in the Olympic Games Beijing 2008 and the 2009 European Champion. He is currently head coach of China's U21 team.

== Personal life ==
He is married to Joanna. In 2009 his wife gave birth to their son Mateusz.

== Career ==
=== Club ===
In 2013, Woicki signed a contract with Transfer Bydgoszcz. After two years he decided to move to Indykpol AZS Olsztyn.

=== National team ===
In 2009 he achieved the title of European Champion. On September 14, 2009 he was awarded the Knight's Cross of Polonia Restituta. The Order was conferred on the following day by the Prime Minister of Poland, Donald Tusk. On July 10, 2011 he won with his national team the first medal of the World League for Poland in history. They won a bronze medal after defeating Argentina. On April 2, 2015 he was appointed to the Polish national team by head coach Stephane Antiga. After the training camp in Spała he went to team B of the Polish national team led by Andrzej Kowal. He took part in the first edition of 2015 European Games. He was a captain of Poland during that tournament.

== Honours ==
=== Club ===
- CEV Champions League
  - 2011–12 – with PGE Skra Bełchatów
- FIVB Club World Championship
  - Doha 2010 – with PGE Skra Bełchatów
- Domestic
  - 2007–08 Polish Cup, with AZS Częstochowa
  - 2010–11 Polish Cup, with PGE Skra Bełchatów
  - 2010–11 Polish Championship, with PGE Skra Bełchatów
  - 2011–12 Polish Cup, with PGE Skra Bełchatów
  - 2012–13 Polish SuperCup, with PGE Skra Bełchatów

=== Youth national team ===
- 2003 FIVB U21 World Championship

=== Individual awards ===
- 2008: Polish Cup – Best setter

=== State awards ===
- 2009: Knight's Cross of Polonia Restituta
