= Mateusz Poręba =

Polish volleyball player (born 1999)

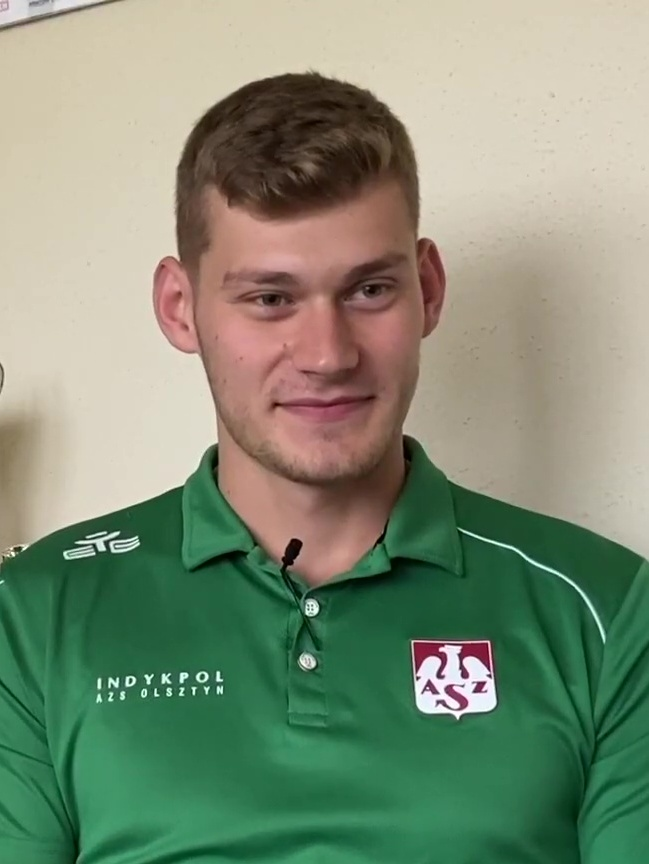

Personal information
- Full name: Mateusz Andrzej Poręba
- Born: 24 August 1999 (age 27); Tuchów, Poland
- Height: 2.04 m (6 ft 8 in)
- Weight: 102 kg (225 lb)
- Spike: 360 cm (142 in)
- Block: 335 cm (132 in)

Volleyball information
- Position: Middle blocker
- Current club: Asseco Resovia
- Number: 1

Career
Years	Teams
2018–2023; 2021; 2023–2024; 2024–2025; 2025–	AZS Olsztyn; Vero Volley Monza; Skra Bełchatów; ZAKSA Kędzierzyn-Koźle; Asseco Resovia

National team
2022–	Poland
Honours
Men's volleyball
Representing Poland
FIVB World Championship
Silver medal – second place	2022 Poland/Slovenia
FIVB Nations League
Gold medal – first place	2025 Ningbo

Mateusz Andrzej Poręba (born 24 August 1999) is a Polish professional volleyball player who plays as a middle blocker for Asseco Resovia and the Poland national team. Poręba won a silver medal with the national team at the 2022 World Championship held in Poland.

== Honours ==
=== World University Games ===
- 2021 Summer World University Games
