= Robbert Andringa =

Dutch volleyball player (born 1990)

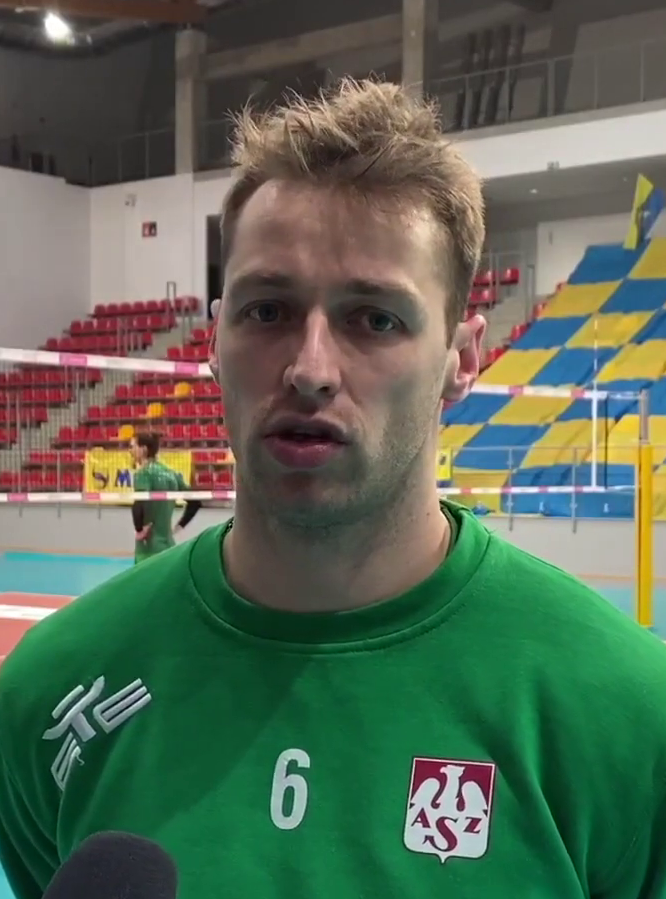

Personal information
- Born: 28 April 1990 (age 36); Assen, Netherlands
- Height: 1.91 m (6 ft 3 in)
- Weight: 86 kg (190 lb)
- Spike: 330 cm (130 in)

Volleyball information
- Position: Outside hitter / Libero
- Current club: Gas Sales Piacenza
- Number: 15

Career
Years	Teams
2008–2013; 2013–2016; 2016–2017; 2017–2023; 2023–	Lycurgus Groningen; Volley Aalst; Stade Poitevin Poitiers; AZS Olsztyn; Gas Sales Piacenza

National team
2010–	Netherlands
Honours
Men's volleyball
Representing Netherlands
European League
Gold medal – first place	2012 Turkey

Robbert Andringa (born 28 April 1990) is a Dutch professional volleyball player who plays for Gas Sales Piacenza and the Netherlands national team.

== Honours ==
=== Club ===
- Domestic
  - 2014–15 Belgian SuperCup, with Volley Aalst
  - 2014–15 Belgian Cup, with Volley Aalst
