= Rafał Buszek =

Polish volleyball player

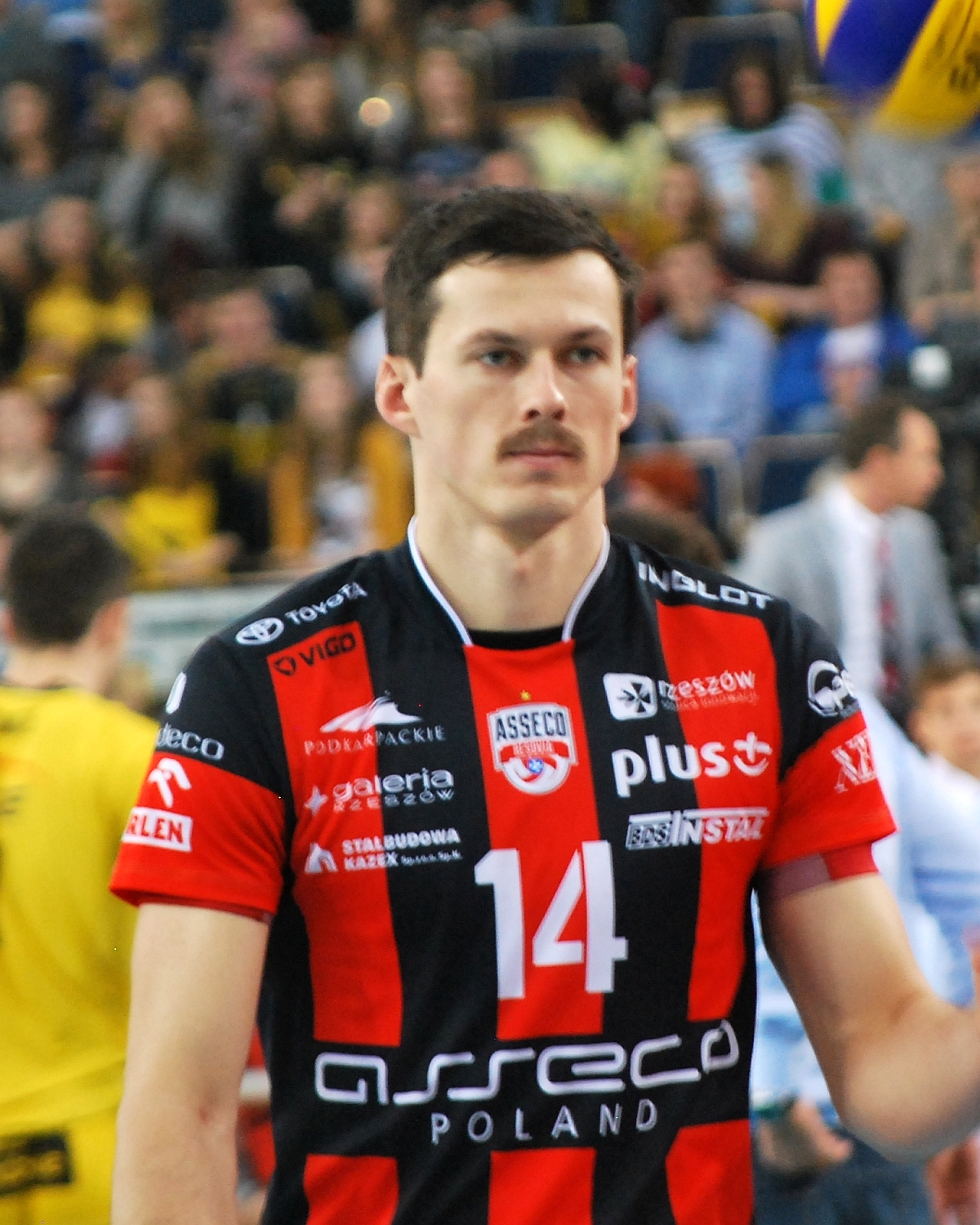
- Buszek in 2014

Personal information
- Full name: Rafał Piotr Buszek
- Born: 28 April 1987 (age 39); Dębica, Poland
- Height: 1.96 m (6 ft 5 in)
- Weight: 88 kg (194 lb)
- Spike: 348 cm (137 in)

Volleyball information
- Position: Outside hitter / Libero
- Current club: Skra Bełchatów
- Number: 4

Career
Years	Teams
2002–2007; 2007–2010; 2010–2011; 2011–2012; 2012–2013; 2013–2014; 2014–2015; 2015–2018; 2018–2022; 2022–2023; 2023–2024; 2024–	Błękitni Ropczyce; AZS Politechnika Warszawska; Asseco Resovia; Fart Kielce; Asseco Resovia; AZS Olsztyn; Asseco Resovia; ZAKSA Kędzierzyn-Koźle; Asseco Resovia; Stal Nysa; Czarni Radom; Skra Bełchatów

National team
2014–	Poland
Honours
Men's volleyball
Representing Poland
FIVB World Championship
Gold medal – first place	2014 Poland
FIVB World Cup
Bronze medal – third place	2015 Japan

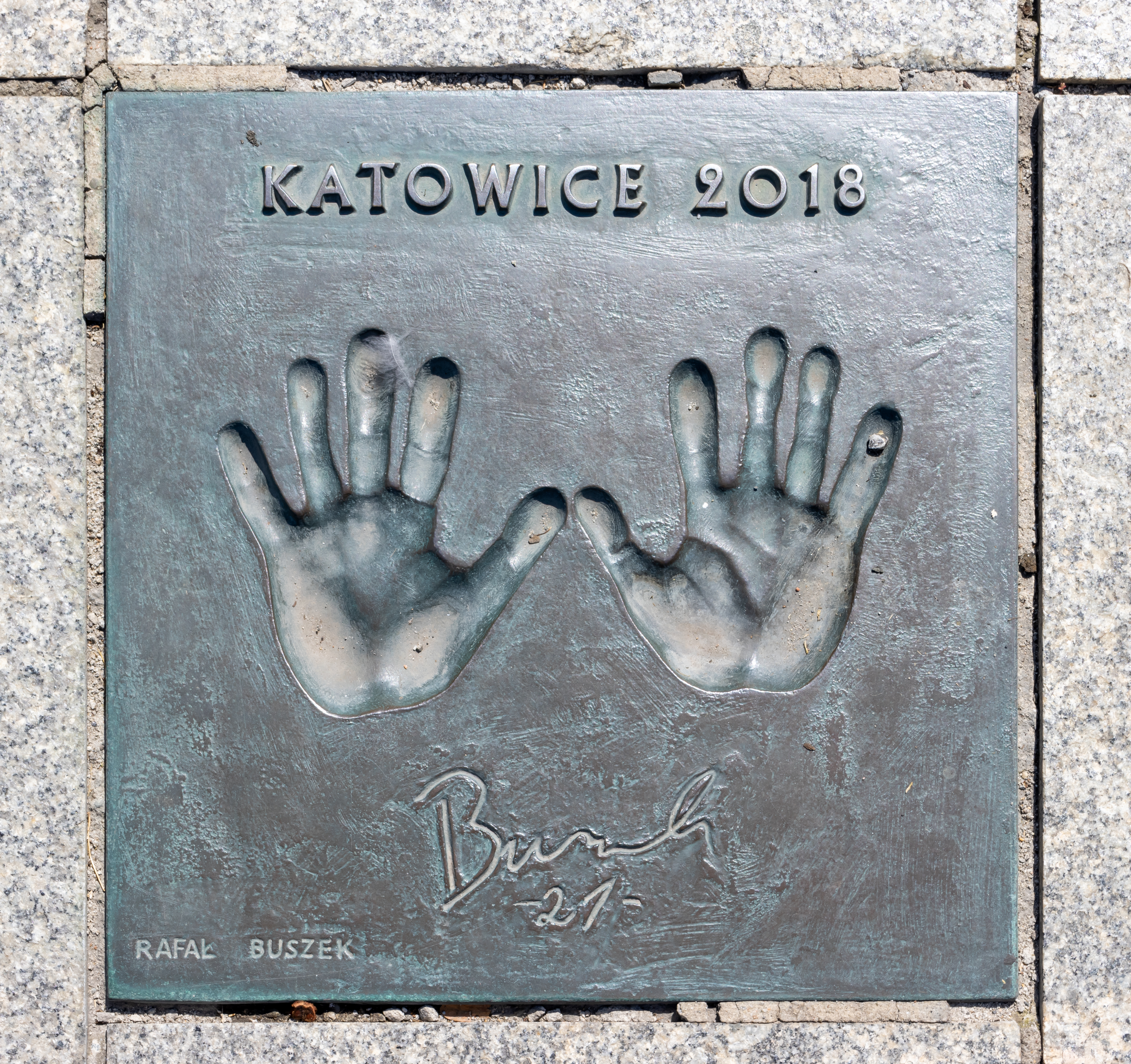
Hand prints and signature at the Avenue of Volleyball Stars, Katowice

Rafał Piotr Buszek (born 28 April 1987) is a Polish professional volleyball player who plays as a libero for Skra Bełchatów. He is a former member of the Poland national team, a participant in the Olympic Games Rio 2016 and the 2014 World Champion.

== Personal life ==
Buszek was born in Dębica, Poland. He is married to Aleksandra. In September 2016, Buszek and his wife announced via social media they are expecting their first child. On October 18, 2016 their son was born and Rafał announced his arrival and added photo via Instagram in February 2017. In May 2018, their daughter was born.

== Career ==
=== Club ===
On April 28, 2015 Buszek achieved his second title of Polish Champion with Asseco Resovia. On May 4, 2015 he signed a contract with another Polish club ZAKSA Kędzierzyn-Koźle.

=== National team ===
Buszek debuted in the Polish national team on May 29, 2014 against Brazil (0-3). He was appointed by coach Stephane Antiga on World League 2014. Initially, he was supposed to be a deputy to principal players during matches in Brazil, but after a few victories (amongst others, the winning match with Brazil on May 31, 2014) he became a favorite to play at the World Championship. On August 16, 2014, Buszek was appointed to the squad at the World Championship held in Poland. On September 21, 2014, he won the title of World Champion 2014 as part of this team. On October 27, 2014, he received a state award granted by the Polish President Bronisław Komorowski – Gold Cross of Merit for outstanding sports achievements and worldwide promotion of Poland.

== Honours ==
=== Club ===
- CEV Champions League
  - 2014–15 – with Asseco Resovia
- Domestic
  - 2012–13 Polish Championship, with Asseco Resovia
  - 2014–15 Polish Championship, with Asseco Resovia
  - 2015–16 Polish Championship, with ZAKSA Kędzierzyn-Koźle
  - 2016–17 Polish Cup, with ZAKSA Kędzierzyn-Koźle
  - 2016–17 Polish Championship, with ZAKSA Kędzierzyn-Koźle

=== State awards ===
- 2014: Gold Cross of Merit
