= Piotr Hain =

Polish volleyball player (born 1991)

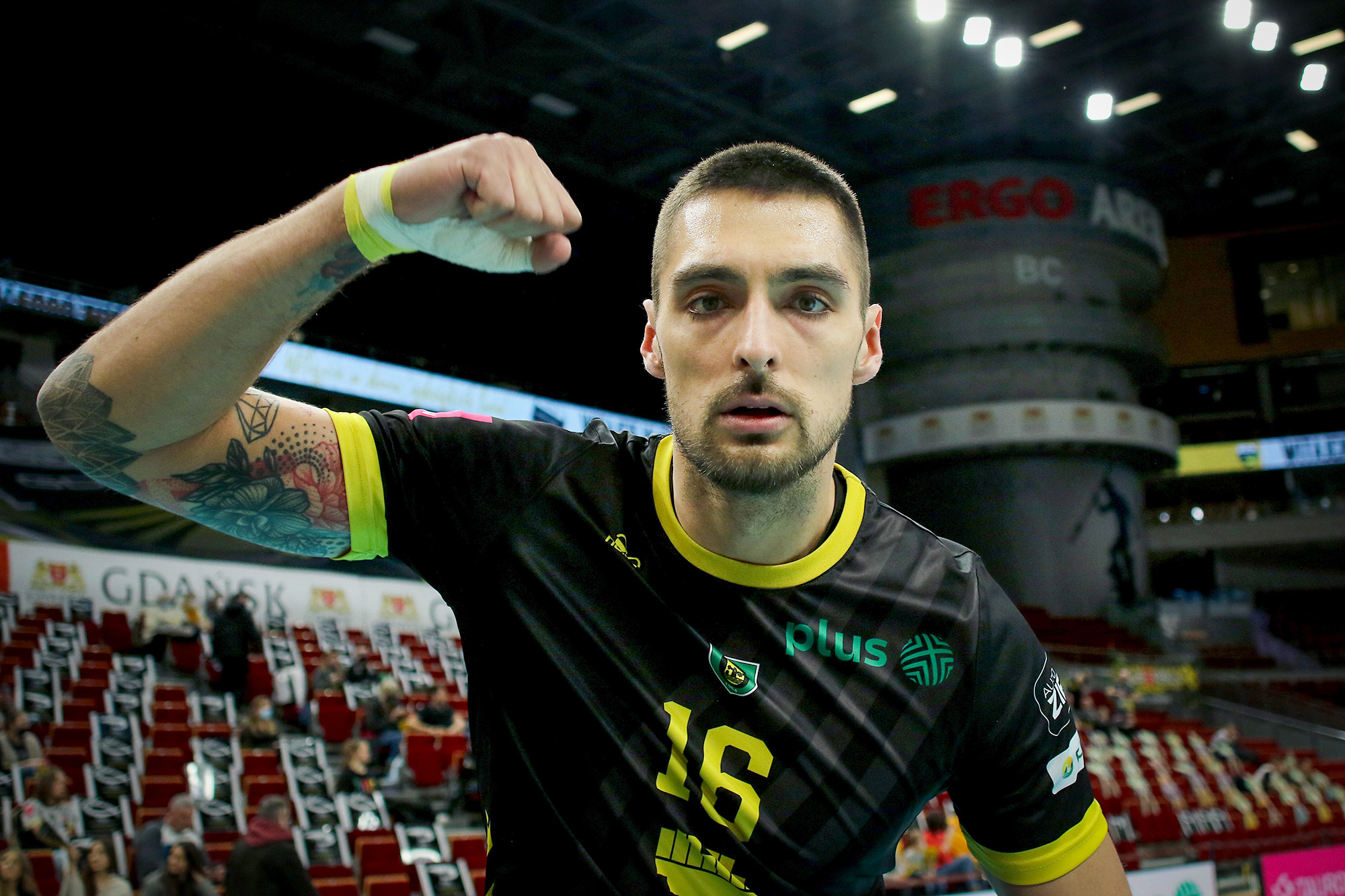
- Hain as GKS Katowice player

Personal information
- Born: 26 February 1991 (age 35); Tarnowskie Góry, Poland
- Height: 2.07 m (6 ft 9 in)

Volleyball information
- Position: Middle blocker

Career
Years	Teams
2010–2015; 2015–2016; 2016–2018; 2018–2020; 2020–2021; 2021–2023; 2023–2024	AZS Olsztyn; Jastrzębski Węgiel; Cuprum Lubin; Jastrzębski Węgiel; Asseco Resovia; GKS Katowice; Norwid Częstochowa

Piotr Hain (born 26 February 1991) is a Polish former professional volleyball player.

== Honours ==
=== Universiade ===
- 2013 Summer Universiade

=== Statistics ===
- 2013–14 PlusLiga – Best blocker (91 blocks)
