= Tomas Rousseaux =

Belgian volleyball player (born 1994)

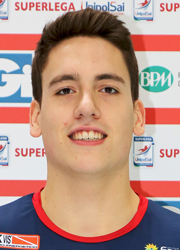

Personal information
- Nationality: Belgian
- Born: 31 March 1994 (age 32) Jette, Belgium
- Height: 1.99 m (6 ft 6 in)
- Weight: 90 kg (198 lb)
- Spike: 360 cm (142 in)

Volleyball information
- Position: Outside hitter

Career
- Years: Team
- 2012–2015 2015–2016 2016–2017 2017–2018 2018–2019 2019–2020 2020–2021 2021–2023 2023 2023 2024: Knack Roeselare; Gi Group Monza; VfB Friedrichshafen; AZS Olsztyn; GKS Katowice; Asseco Resovia; Ślepsk Suwałki; GKS Katowice; Modena Volley; PAOK Thessaloniki; Al Ittihad

National team
- Years: Team
- 2015–: Belgium

Tomas Rousseaux (born 31 March 1994) is a Belgian professional volleyball player who plays as an outside hitter for Al Ittihad and the Belgium national team.

== Personal life ==
His sister, Hélène is also a volleyball player, while their father, Emile is a volleyball coach.

== Honours ==
=== Club ===
- CEV Cup
  - 2022–23 – with Valsa Group Modena
- Domestic
  - 2012–13 Belgian Cup, with Knack Roeselare
  - 2012–13 Belgian Championship, with Knack Roeselare
  - 2013–14 Belgian SuperCup, with Knack Roeselare
  - 2013–14 Belgian Championship, with Knack Roeselare
  - 2014–15 Belgian SuperCup, with Knack Roeselare
  - 2014–15 Belgian Championship, with Knack Roeselare
  - 2016–17 German SuperCup, with VfB Friedrichshafen
  - 2016–17 German Cup, with VfB Friedrichshafen
