= Wojciech Włodarczyk =

Polish volleyball player (born 1990)

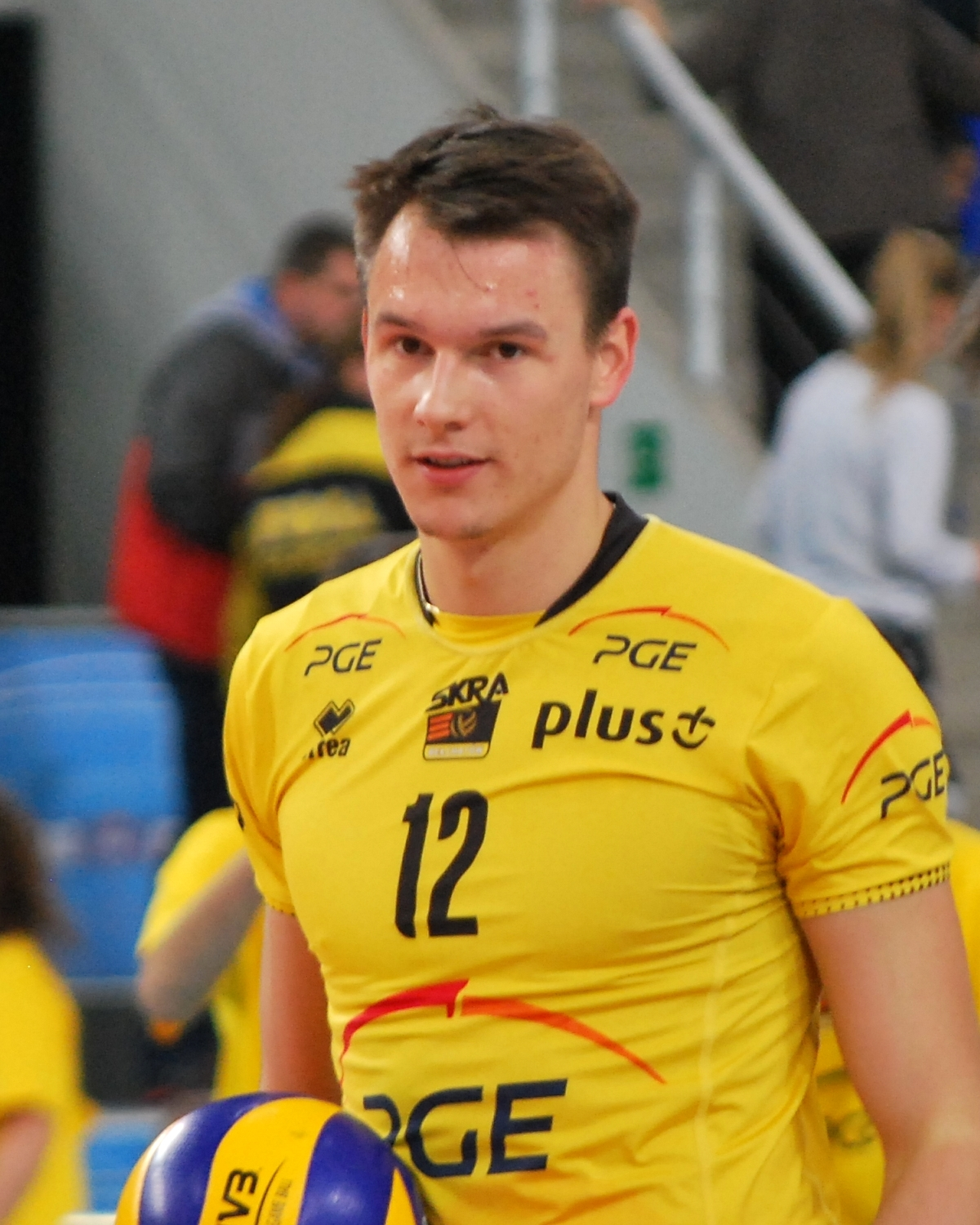

Personal information
- Full name: Wojciech Julian Włodarczyk
- Nickname: Włodi
- Born: 28 October 1990 (age 36) Andrychów, Poland
- Height: 2.00 m (6 ft 7 in)
- Weight: 88 kg (194 lb)
- Spike: 348 cm (137 in)

Volleyball information
- Position: Outside hitter
- Current club: GKS Katowice
- Number: 12

Career
- Years: Team
- 2009–2010 2010–2011 2011–2012 2012–2013 2013–2015 2015–2016 2016–2017 2017–2018 2018–2019 2019–2020 2020–2021 2021–2023 2023–2025 2025–: AZS Politechnika Warszawska; AZS Olsztyn; BBTS Bielsko-Biała; SK Posojilnica Aich/Dob; Skra Bełchatów; Cuprum Lubin; AZS Olsztyn; Onico Warsaw; BCC Castellana Grotte; Czarni Radom; Kioene Padova; LKPS Lublin; Stal Nysa; GKS Katowice

Wojciech Julian Włodarczyk (born 28 October 1990) is a Polish professional volleyball player who plays as an outside hitter for GKS Katowice.

== Career ==
=== Club ===
In 2013 went to one of the best clubs in Poland - PGE Skra Bełchatów. In season 2013/2014 won with this team title of Polish Champion. On October 8, 2014, his team won ENEA Polish SuperCup 2014. On May 6, 2015, he won with PGE Skra Bełchatów bronze medal of Polish Championship. Then signed a contract with MKS Cuprum Lubin. In season 2016/17 he was one of the main player in Indykpol AZS Olsztyn and his club took 5th place in PlusLiga. On April 27, 2017, he signed two-year contract with ONICO Warszawa.

=== National team ===
He won a silver medal of Universiade 2013. Włodarczyk was appointed to the Poland men's national volleyball team first time by head coach Andrea Anastasi in 2013. He was in squad on World League 2013. On August 14, 2015, he achieved bronze of European League. His national team won 3rd place match with Estonia (3–0).

== Honours ==
=== Club ===
- Domestic
  - 2012–13 Austrian Championship, with SK Posojilnica Aich/Dob
  - 2013–14 Polish Championship, with PGE Skra Bełchatów
  - 2014–15 Polish SuperCup, with PGE Skra Bełchatów

=== Universiade ===
- 2013 Summer Universiade
