= Michał Żurek =

Polish volleyball player

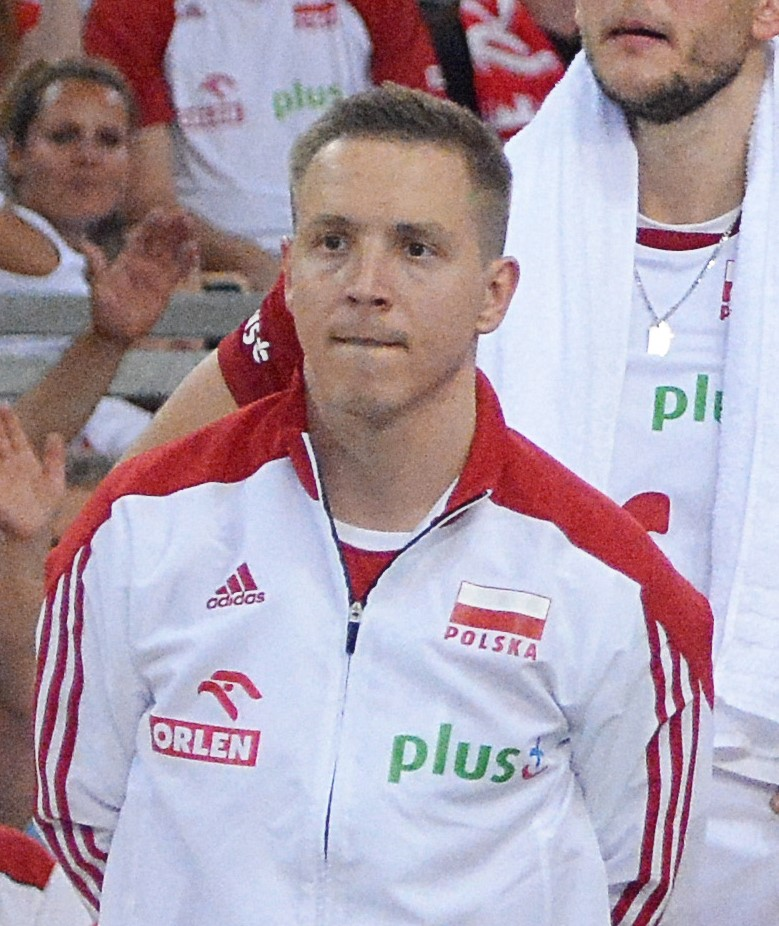

Personal information
- Nationality: Polish
- Born: 3 June 1988 (age 38); Kędzierzyn-Koźle, Poland
- Height: 1.81 m (5 ft 11 in)

Volleyball information
- Position: Libero

Career
Years	Teams
2009–2011; 2011–2012; 2012–2014; 2014–2015; 2015–2016; 2016–2020; 2020–2022	Trefl Gdańsk; Fart Kielce; AZS Olsztyn; Asseco Resovia; Łuczniczka Bydgoszcz; AZS Olsztyn; Warta Zawiercie

Michał Żurek (born 3 June 1988) is a Polish former professional volleyball player.

== Career ==
In 2012, Żurek joined Indykpol AZS Olsztyn. He spent there two seasons. In 2014, he signed a contract with Asseco Resovia.

== Honours ==
=== Club ===
- CEV Champions League
  - 2014–15 – with Asseco Resovia
- Domestic
  - 2014–15 Polish Championship, with Asseco Resovia

=== Youth national team ===
- Beach volleyball
  - 2005 CEV U18 European Championship, with Radosław Zbierski
