= Daniel Pliński =

Polish volleyball player and coach

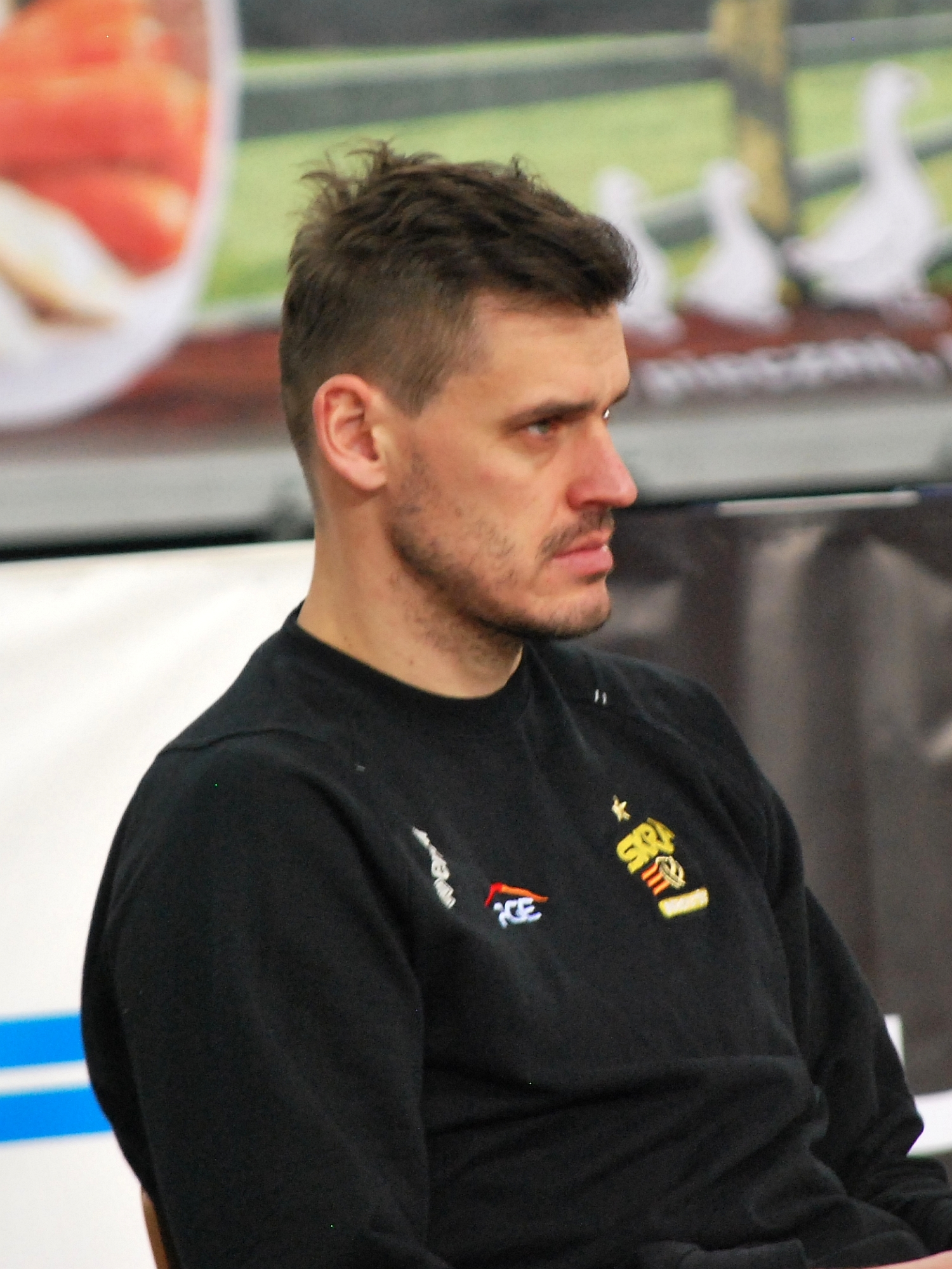

Personal information
- Full name: Daniel Mateusz Pliński
- Nickname: Plina
- Born: 10 December 1978 (age 47); Puck, Poland
- Height: 2.04 m (6 ft 8 in)

Coaching information
- Current team: AZS Olsztyn
Previous teams coached
Years	Teams
2021; 2021–2024; 2025–	Stalpro Błyskawica; Stal Nysa; AZS Olsztyn

Volleyball information
- Position: Middle blocker

Career
Years	Teams
1997–2002; 2002–2004; 2004–2007; 2007–2014; 2014–2016; 2016–2018	Korab Puck; Stolarka Wołomin; Płomień Sosnowiec; Jastrzębski Węgiel; Skra Bełchatów; Czarni Radom; AZS Olsztyn

National team
2005–2010	Poland (142)
Honours
Men's volleyball
Representing Poland
FIVB World Championship
Silver medal – second place	2006 Japan
CEV European Championship
Gold medal – first place	2009 Turkey

Daniel Mateusz Pliński (born 10 December 1978) is a Polish professional volleyball coach and former player. He was a member of the Poland national team from 2005 to 2010, a participant in the Olympic Games Beijing 2008, silver medallist at the 2006 World Championship and the 2009 European Champion. Pliński serves as head coach for the Polish PlusLiga team, Indykpol AZS Olsztyn.

== Personal life ==
Daniel Pliński was born in Puck. He has three brothers Piotr, Wiesław, Wojciech and two sisters – Wioleta and Iwona. On 24 September 2004, he married Marta. They have two daughters – Julia (born 10 April 2006) and Lena (born 2012).

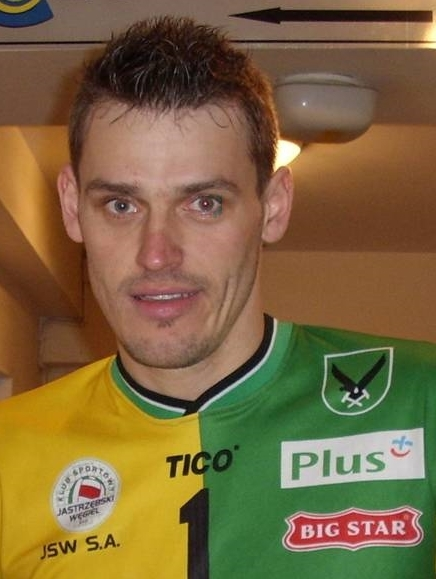
As a player of Jastrzębski Węgiel.

== Career ==
=== Club ===
He was a player of PGE Skra Bełchatów for seven years. With this team, he won, among others: five titles of Polish Champion (2008, 2009, 2010, 2011, 2014), three Polish Cups (2009, 2011, 2012), silver and bronze medal of the CEV Champions League. On 9 May 2014, it was announced that Pliński will join Cerrad Czarni Radom.

He retired from volleyball on 24 May 2018.

=== National team ===
Pliński was a member of the Polish national team which won a gold medal at the 2009 European Championship held in Turkey. On 14 September 2009, he was awarded the Knight's Cross of Polonia Restituta. The Order was conferred on the following day by the Prime Minister of Poland, Donald Tusk.

== Honours ==
=== Club ===
- CEV Champions League
  - 2011–12 – with PGE Skra Bełchatów
- FIVB Club World Championship
  - Doha 2009 – with PGE Skra Bełchatów
  - Doha 2010 – with PGE Skra Bełchatów
- Domestic
  - 2002–03 Polish Cup, with Płomień Sosnowiec
  - 2003–04 Polish Cup, with Płomień Sosnowiec
  - 2007–08 Polish Championship, with PGE Skra Bełchatów
  - 2008–09 Polish Cup, with PGE Skra Bełchatów
  - 2008–09 Polish Championship, with PGE Skra Bełchatów
  - 2009–10 Polish Championship, with PGE Skra Bełchatów
  - 2010–11 Polish Cup, with PGE Skra Bełchatów
  - 2010–11 Polish Championship, with PGE Skra Bełchatów
  - 2011–12 Polish Cup, with PGE Skra Bełchatów
  - 2013–14 Polish Championship, with PGE Skra Bełchatów

=== State awards ===
- 2006: Gold Cross of Merit
- 2009: Knight's Cross of Polonia Restituta
