= AZS Olsztyn (volleyball) =

Polish volleyball club

Energa Indykpol AZS Olsztyn
- Full name: Piłka Siatkowa AZS UWM; Spółka Akcyjna
- Founded: 1950; 76 years ago
- Ground: Hala Urania (Capacity: 4,046)
- Chairman: Tomasz Jankowski
- Manager: Daniel Pliński
- Captain: Jan Hadrava
- League: Tauron Liga
- 2025–26: 6th place
- Website: Club home page

Uniforms
Home	Away

AZS Olsztyn, officially known for sponsorship reasons as Energa Indykpol AZS Olsztyn, is a professional men's volleyball club based in Olsztyn in northeastern Poland, founded in 1950 as a university team (AZS), located near the University of Warmia and Mazury campus. They play in the top flight of Polish volleyball, Tauron Liga.

It is one of the most successful volleyball clubs in Poland, having won 5 domestic league titles and 7 national cups.

== Honours ==
=== Domestic ===
- Polish Championship

Winners (5): 1972–73, 1975–76, 1977–78, 1990–91, 1991–92

- Polish Cup

Winners (7): 1969–70, 1970–71, 1971–72, 1981–82, 1988–89, 1990–91, 1991–92

=== International ===
- CEV Cup

Silver (1): 1977–78

== Team ==
As of 2026–27 season

No.	Name	Date of birth	Position
1	(Poland) Jakub Majchrzak	13 May 2004 (age 22)	middle blocker
2	(Germany) Moritz Karlitzek	12 August 1996 (age 30)	outside hitter
4	(Poland) Łukasz Kozub	3 November 1997 (age 29)	setter
5	(Poland) Jakub Ciunajtis	6 August 1998 (age 28)	libero
6	(Germany) Johannes Tille	7 May 1997 (age 29)	setter
11	(Poland) Seweryn Lipiński	1 January 2001 (age 25)	middle blocker
12	(Poland) Karol Urbanowicz	24 February 2001 (age 25)	middle blocker
13	(Poland) Kacper Sienkiewicz	11 April 2005 (age 21)	outside hitter
14	(Poland) Kuba Hawryluk	8 September 2003 (age 23)	libero
15	(Poland) Paweł Halaba	14 December 1995 (age 30)	outside hitter
19	(Poland) Paweł Cieślik	18 March 2000 (age 26)	middle blocker
21	(Poland) Szymon Patecki	4 April 2005 (age 21)	opposite
22	(Poland) Karol Borkowski	14 February 1998 (age 28)	outside hitter
31	(Canada) Arthur Szwarc	30 March 1995 (age 31)	opposite
74	(Bulgaria) Dimitar Dimitrov	12 November 2000 (age 25)	opposite
91	(Czech Republic) Jan Hadrava	3 June 1991 (age 35)	opposite
Head coach:		(Poland) Daniel Pliński	

== Season by season ==
Season	Tier	League	Pos.
2008–09	1	PlusLiga	6
2009–10	1	PlusLiga	7
2010–11	1	PlusLiga	8
2011–12	1	PlusLiga	10
2012–13	1	PlusLiga	10
2013–14	1	PlusLiga	5
2014–15	1	PlusLiga	10
2015–16	1	PlusLiga	10
2016–17	1	PlusLiga	5

Season	Tier	League	Pos.
2017–18	1	PlusLiga	4
2018–19	1	PlusLiga	10
2019–20	1	PlusLiga	8
2020–21	1	PlusLiga	10
2021–22	1	PlusLiga	6
2022–23	1	PlusLiga	8
2023–24	1	PlusLiga	8
2024–25	1	PlusLiga	9
2025–26	1	PlusLiga	6

== Former names ==
Years	Name
1950–1969	KU AZS Wyższej Szkoły Rolniczej w Olsztynie
1969–1999	KU AZS Akademii Rolniczo–Technicznej w Olsztynie
1999–2000	KS AZS UWM Olsztyn
2000–2001	Indykpol AZS Olsztyn
2001–2005	PZU AZS Olsztyn
2005–2007	KS PZU AZS Olsztyn
2007–2008	Mlekpol AZS Olsztyn
2008–2010	AZS UWM Olsztyn
2010–2011	Indykpol AZS UWM Olsztyn
2011–2026	Indykpol AZS Olsztyn
2026–present	Energa Indykpol AZS Olsztyn

== See also ==
- AZS Olsztyn players
- AZS Olsztyn coaches
