= 2024–25 PlusLiga =

Polish volleyball league

- League: PlusLiga
- Sport: Volleyball
- Duration: 13 September 2024 – 10 May 2025
- Games: 264
- Teams: 16
- Total attendance: 663,856 (2,515 per match)
- TV partner: Polsat Sport
- League champions: Bogdanka LUK Lublin (1st title)

Seasons
- 2023–24 2025–26

The 2024–25 PlusLiga was the 89th season of the Polish Volleyball Championship, the 72nd season of the highest tier domestic division in the Polish volleyball league system since its establishment in 1954, and the 25th season as a professional league. The league is operated by the Polish Volleyball League SA (Polish: Polska Liga Siatkówki SA).

This season was composed of 16 teams. The regular season was played as a round-robin tournament. Each team played a total of 30 matches, half at home and half away. The season started on 13 September 2024 and concluded on 10 May 2025.

Bogdanka LUK Lublin claimed their maiden Polish Champions title, beating Aluron CMC Warta Zawiercie in the finals, and therefore becoming only the 5th club in PlusLiga history to have won the league.

== Regular season ==
Ranking system:

1. Points
2. Number of victories
3. Set ratio
4. Setpoint ratio
5. H2H results

Result	Winners	Losers
3–0	3 points	0 points
3–1	3 points	0 points
3–2	2 points	1 point

Pos	Team	Pld	W	L	Pts	SW	SL	SR	SPW	SPL	SPR	Qualification or relegation
1	Jastrzębski Węgiel	30	24	6	75	80	31	2.581	2682	2371	1.131	Quarterfinals
2	PGE Projekt Warsaw	30	26	4	72	81	33	2.455	2665	2396	1.112	Quarterfinals
3	Aluron CMC Warta Zawiercie	30	24	6	72	79	32	2.469	2634	2353	1.119	Quarterfinals
4	Bogdanka LUK Lublin	30	21	9	63	74	43	1.721	2691	2495	1.079	Quarterfinals
5	ZAKSA Kędzierzyn-Koźle	30	21	9	62	70	46	1.522	2703	2485	1.088	Quarterfinals
6	Asseco Resovia	30	19	11	59	73	50	1.460	2809	2712	1.036	Quarterfinals
7	PGE GiEK Skra Bełchatów	30	17	13	51	63	54	1.167	2630	2606	1.009	Quarterfinals
8	Norwid Częstochowa	30	16	14	46	60	59	1.017	2687	2647	1.015	Quarterfinals
9	Indykpol AZS Olsztyn	30	12	18	40	52	60	0.867	2507	2553	0.982	
10	Ślepsk Malow Suwałki	30	14	16	39	56	66	0.848	2658	2744	0.969	
11	Trefl Gdańsk	30	11	19	34	50	70	0.714	2606	2740	0.951	
12	Cuprum Stilon Gorzów	30	11	19	28	45	72	0.625	2588	2738	0.945	
13	Barkom-Kazhany Lviv	30	9	21	26	46	73	0.630	2593	2756	0.941	
14	PSG Stal Nysa	30	7	23	25	40	77	0.519	2513	2688	0.935	Relegation
15	GKS Katowice	30	5	25	15	33	81	0.407	2413	2707	0.891	Relegation
16	MKS Będzin	30	3	27	13	27	82	0.329	2217	2605	0.851	Relegation

Source: PlusLiga

=== 1st round ===
Date	Time		Score		Set 1	Set 2	Set 3	Set 4	Set 5	Total	Report
13 Sep	20:30	Aluron CMC Warta Zawiercie	2–3	Bogdanka LUK Lublin	29–27	22–25	23–25	25–20	12–15	111–112	
14 Sep	14:45	PGE Projekt Warsaw	3–0	ZAKSA Kędzierzyn-Koźle	25–22	25–23	25–19			75–64	
14 Sep	17:30	Cuprum Stilon Gorzów	3–2	Trefl Gdańsk	19–25	25–19	21–25	25–22	15–13	105–104	
14 Sep	20:30	Barkom-Kazhany Lviv	1–3	Jastrzębski Węgiel	17–25	14–25	25–23	21–25		77–98	
15 Sep	17:30	Indykpol AZS Olsztyn	1–3	PGE GiEK Skra Bełchatów	29–27	21–25	22–25	18–25		90–102	
15 Sep	20:30	GKS Katowice	0–3	MKS Będzin	27–29	19–25	23–25			69–79	
17 Sep	17:30	Norwid Częstochowa	1–3	Ślepsk Malow Suwałki	25–20	18–25	23–25	17–25		83–95	
30 Oct	17:30	Asseco Resovia	3–2	PSG Stal Nysa	23–25	23–25	25–22	27–25	15–9	113–106	

=== 2nd round ===
Date	Time		Score		Set 1	Set 2	Set 3	Set 4	Set 5	Total	Report
20 Sep	20:30	Bogdanka LUK Lublin	3–2	Trefl Gdańsk	23–25	25–23	25–19	23–25	15–10	111–102	
21 Sep	14:45	Jastrzębski Węgiel	3–0	Asseco Resovia	26–24	25–21	25–15			76–60	
21 Sep	20:30	Aluron CMC Warta Zawiercie	3–0	Barkom-Kazhany Lviv	25–23	25–23	25–21			75–67	
22 Sep	14:45	PGE GiEK Skra Bełchatów	3–0	Cuprum Stilon Gorzów	25–18	25–22	25–15			75–55	
22 Sep	17:30	Ślepsk Malow Suwałki	3–1	Indykpol AZS Olsztyn	15–25	25–15	25–19	25–19		90–78	
23 Sep	17:30	MKS Będzin	0–3	PGE Projekt Warsaw	18–25	15–25	18–25			51–75	
23 Sep	20:30	GKS Katowice	0–3	PSG Stal Nysa	17–25	23–25	17–25			57–75	
8 Oct	20:30	ZAKSA Kędzierzyn-Koźle	2–3	Norwid Częstochowa	25–23	18–25	20–25	25–23	9–15	97–111	

=== 3rd round ===
Date	Time		Score		Set 1	Set 2	Set 3	Set 4	Set 5	Total	Report
26 Sep	17:30	PGE Projekt Warsaw	3–1	PSG Stal Nysa	25–20	25–23	23–25	25–11		98–79	
27 Sep	17:30	PGE GiEK Skra Bełchatów	3–2	Trefl Gdańsk	25–27	25–22	18–25	25–21	15–13	108–108	
28 Sep	14:45	Asseco Resovia	2–3	Aluron CMC Warta Zawiercie	25–21	19–25	23–25	25–23	12–15	104–109	
28 Sep	17:30	GKS Katowice	1–3	Jastrzębski Węgiel	25–22	17–25	17–25	18–25		77–97	
28 Sep	20:30	Cuprum Stilon Gorzów	3–1	Ślepsk Malow Suwałki	25–20	25–19	21–25	28–26		99–90	
29 Sep	17:30	Norwid Częstochowa	3–0	MKS Będzin	25–20	25–19	25–14			75–53	
29 Sep	20:30	Barkom-Kazhany Lviv	1–3	Bogdanka LUK Lublin	18–25	25–18	23–25	21–25		87–93	
30 Sep	17:30	Indykpol AZS Olsztyn	1–3	ZAKSA Kędzierzyn-Koźle	17–25	27–25	20–25	21–25		85–100	

=== 4th round ===
Date	Time		Score		Set 1	Set 2	Set 3	Set 4	Set 5	Total	Report
18 Sep	20:30	Barkom-Kazhany Lviv	1–3	Asseco Resovia	25–27	21–25	25–17	20–25		91–94	
1 Oct	17:30	Ślepsk Malow Suwałki	1–3	Trefl Gdańsk	23–25	25–22	25–27	21–25		94–99	
1 Oct	20:30	Jastrzębski Węgiel	3–1	PGE Projekt Warsaw	25–19	21–25	25–14	25–20		96–78	
2 Oct	17:30	Bogdanka LUK Lublin	3–0	PGE GiEK Skra Bełchatów	25–23	25–21	25–19			75–63	
2 Oct	20:30	Aluron CMC Warta Zawiercie	3–1	GKS Katowice	23–25	27–25	26–24	25–17		101–91	
9 Oct	20:30	MKS Będzin	3–0	Indykpol AZS Olsztyn	25–20	25–22	25–17			75–59	
15 Oct	17:30	ZAKSA Kędzierzyn-Koźle	3–1	Cuprum Stilon Gorzów	25–21	25–20	20–25	25–16		95–82	
16 Oct	17:30	PSG Stal Nysa	1–3	Norwid Częstochowa	20–25	21–25	25–20	21–25		87–95	

=== 5th round ===
Date	Time		Score		Set 1	Set 2	Set 3	Set 4	Set 5	Total	Report
4 Oct	20:30	Cuprum Stilon Gorzów	3–1	MKS Będzin	25–23	25–19	18–25	25–21		93–88	
5 Oct	14:45	Bogdanka LUK Lublin	3–1	Asseco Resovia	25–18	23–25	25–18	27–25		100–86	
5 Oct	17:30	Trefl Gdańsk	0–3	ZAKSA Kędzierzyn-Koźle	26–28	22–25	23–25			71–78	
5 Oct	20:30	Norwid Częstochowa	3–2	Jastrzębski Węgiel	25–22	23–25	19–25	25–21	15–10	107–103	
6 Oct	14:45	PGE GiEK Skra Bełchatów	3–1	Ślepsk Malow Suwałki	28–26	17–25	25–19	26–24		96–94	
6 Oct	17:30	Indykpol AZS Olsztyn	3–0	PSG Stal Nysa	25–18	25–17	26–24			76–59	
7 Oct	17:30	GKS Katowice	3–1	Barkom-Kazhany Lviv	25–18	21–25	25–15	25–22		96–80	
7 Oct	20:30	PGE Projekt Warsaw	3–0	Aluron CMC Warta Zawiercie	25–15	25–23	25–19			75–57	

=== 6th round ===
Date	Time		Score		Set 1	Set 2	Set 3	Set 4	Set 5	Total	Report
11 Oct	17:30	Asseco Resovia	3–1	GKS Katowice	28–30	25–23	25–21	25–23		103–97	
11 Oct	20:30	Jastrzębski Węgiel	3–0	Indykpol AZS Olsztyn	25–21	25–15	25–19			75–55	
12 Oct	14:45	ZAKSA Kędzierzyn-Koźle	3–1	PGE GiEK Skra Bełchatów	25–20	25–18	29–31	25–22		104–91	
12 Oct	20:30	Barkom-Kazhany Lviv	1–3	PGE Projekt Warsaw	25–18	18–25	20–25	18–25		81–93	
13 Oct	14:45	Bogdanka LUK Lublin	3–1	Ślepsk Malow Suwałki	25–18	25–20	24–26	25–20		99–84	
13 Oct	17:30	Aluron CMC Warta Zawiercie	3–0	Norwid Częstochowa	25–21	30–28	25–15			80–64	
13 Oct	20:30	PSG Stal Nysa	2–3	Cuprum Stilon Gorzów	25–19	14–25	25–22	23–25	13–15	100–106	
14 Oct	20:30	MKS Będzin	2–3	Trefl Gdańsk	25–23	21–25	25–22	18–25	10–15	99–110	

=== 7th round ===
Date	Time		Score		Set 1	Set 2	Set 3	Set 4	Set 5	Total	Report
16 Oct	20:30	PGE Projekt Warsaw	3–2	Asseco Resovia	25–19	21–25	22–25	25–18	15–9	108–96	
18 Oct	17:30	Ślepsk Malow Suwałki	3–2	ZAKSA Kędzierzyn-Koźle	25–21	16–25	25–22	20–25	15–13	101–106	
18 Oct	20:30	Aluron CMC Warta Zawiercie	3–1	Indykpol AZS Olsztyn	22–25	25–20	25–22	25–22		97–89	
19 Oct	14:45	Cuprum Stilon Gorzów	1–3	Jastrzębski Węgiel	29–27	21–25	15–25	21–25		86–102	
19 Oct	17:30	PGE GiEK Skra Bełchatów	3–1	MKS Będzin	23–25	25–19	25–19	25–21		98–84	
19 Oct	20:30	GKS Katowice	0–3	Bogdanka LUK Lublin	23–25	20–25	16–25			59–75	
20 Oct	14:45	Trefl Gdańsk	1–3	PSG Stal Nysa	25–22	21–25	16–25	21–25		83–97	
20 Oct	20:30	Norwid Częstochowa	0–3	Barkom-Kazhany Lviv	22–25	29–31	21–25			72–81	

=== 8th round ===
Date	Time		Score		Set 1	Set 2	Set 3	Set 4	Set 5	Total	Report
18 Sep	17:30	PGE Projekt Warsaw	3–0	GKS Katowice	25–23	25–21	25–16			75–60	
22 Oct	17:30	Asseco Resovia	2–3	Norwid Częstochowa	17–25	25–23	25–15	28–30	12–15	107–108	
22 Oct	20:30	Aluron CMC Warta Zawiercie	3–0	Cuprum Stilon Gorzów	25–18	25–16	25–21			75–55	
23 Oct	17:30	Jastrzębski Węgiel	3–1	Trefl Gdańsk	29–27	28–30	25–20	25–13		107–90	
23 Oct	20:30	Bogdanka LUK Lublin	3–0	ZAKSA Kędzierzyn-Koźle	25–16	25–22	25–20			75–58	
13 Nov	17:30	PSG Stal Nysa	2–3	PGE GiEK Skra Bełchatów	25–18	18–25	19–25	25–23	12–15	99–106	
26 Nov	17:30	Barkom-Kazhany Lviv	1–3	Indykpol AZS Olsztyn	23–25	23–25	25–21	17–25		88–96	
27 Nov	17:30	MKS Będzin	2–3	Ślepsk Malow Suwałki	25–15	20–25	22–25	25–22	7–15	99–102	

=== 9th round ===
Date	Time		Score		Set 1	Set 2	Set 3	Set 4	Set 5	Total	Report
25 Oct	20:30	Ślepsk Malow Suwałki	3–1	PSG Stal Nysa	18–25	25–20	25–21	25–12		93–78	
26 Oct	14:45	PGE Projekt Warsaw	3–1	Bogdanka LUK Lublin	21–25	25–20	25–15	25–21		96–81	
27 Oct	14:45	Indykpol AZS Olsztyn	0–3	Asseco Resovia	22–25	14–25	18–25			54–75	
27 Oct	17:30	Trefl Gdańsk	3–2	Aluron CMC Warta Zawiercie	18–25	26–24	24–26	25–22	15–12	108–109	
27 Oct	20:30	Norwid Częstochowa	3–1	GKS Katowice	25–21	26–24	21–25	25–21		97–91	
28 Oct	17:30	PGE GiEK Skra Bełchatów	1–3	Jastrzębski Węgiel	19–25	26–24	16–25	21–25		82–99	
28 Oct	20:30	Cuprum Stilon Gorzów	3–1	Barkom-Kazhany Lviv	25–20	20–25	26–24	25–17		96–86	
29 Oct	17:30	ZAKSA Kędzierzyn-Koźle	3–0	MKS Będzin	25–18	25–14	25–22			75–54	

=== 10th round ===
Date	Time		Score		Set 1	Set 2	Set 3	Set 4	Set 5	Total	Report
1 Nov	17:30	Barkom-Kazhany Lviv	3–2	Trefl Gdańsk	25–19	13–25	25–20	22–25	15–10	100–99	
1 Nov	20:30	GKS Katowice	1–3	Indykpol AZS Olsztyn	20–25	22–25	26–24	11–25		79–99	
2 Nov	14:45	Aluron CMC Warta Zawiercie	3–0	PGE GiEK Skra Bełchatów	25–17	25–21	25–20			75–58	
2 Nov	17:30	Bogdanka LUK Lublin	3–1	MKS Będzin	25–18	21–25	25–20	25–23		96–86	
2 Nov	20:30	PGE Projekt Warsaw	1–3	Norwid Częstochowa	20–25	22–25	25–19	21–25		88–94	
3 Nov	14:45	PSG Stal Nysa	1–3	ZAKSA Kędzierzyn-Koźle	25–23	23–25	23–25	21–25		92–98	
3 Nov	17:30	Asseco Resovia	2–3	Cuprum Stilon Gorzów	35–33	18–25	31–29	17–25	13–15	114–127	
4 Nov	17:30	Jastrzębski Węgiel	3–1	Ślepsk Malow Suwałki	23–25	25–16	25–23	25–19		98–83	

=== 11th round ===
Date	Time		Score		Set 1	Set 2	Set 3	Set 4	Set 5	Total	Report
7 Nov	20:30	MKS Będzin	3–1	PSG Stal Nysa	25–17	23–25	25–22	25–22		98–86	
8 Nov	17:30	Norwid Częstochowa	3–1	Bogdanka LUK Lublin	25–20	24–26	25–16	25–22		99–84	
8 Nov	20:30	Indykpol AZS Olsztyn	2–3	PGE Projekt Warsaw	26–24	22–25	28–26	23–25	14–16	113–116	
9 Nov	14:45	ZAKSA Kędzierzyn-Koźle	3–1	Jastrzębski Węgiel	22–25	25–22	25–23	25–16		97–86	
9 Nov	17:30	Ślepsk Malow Suwałki	0–3	Aluron CMC Warta Zawiercie	11–25	18–25	21–25			50–75	
9 Nov	20:30	PGE GiEK Skra Bełchatów	3–0	Barkom-Kazhany Lviv	25–15	25–23	26–24			76–62	
10 Nov	14:45	Trefl Gdańsk	2–3	Asseco Resovia	21–25	14–25	25–18	25–20	13–15	98–103	
11 Nov	20:30	Cuprum Stilon Gorzów	3–2	GKS Katowice	20–25	25–22	25–21	21–25	15–13	106–106	

=== 12th round ===
Date	Time		Score		Set 1	Set 2	Set 3	Set 4	Set 5	Total	Report
14 Nov	17:30	Barkom-Kazhany Lviv	2–3	Ślepsk Malow Suwałki	20–25	22–25	25–23	25–16	8–15	100–104	
15 Nov	17:00	Norwid Częstochowa	3–2	Indykpol AZS Olsztyn	22–25	25–19	26–28	25–17	16–14	114–103	
15 Nov	20:30	GKS Katowice	1–3	Trefl Gdańsk	24–26	21–25	25–21	20–25		90–97	
16 Nov	14:45	Aluron CMC Warta Zawiercie	3–1	ZAKSA Kędzierzyn-Koźle	25–20	25–22	20–25	25–22		95–89	
16 Nov	17:30	Bogdanka LUK Lublin	3–0	PSG Stal Nysa	25–21	26–24	25–22			76–67	
16 Nov	20:30	Jastrzębski Węgiel	3–1	MKS Będzin	21–25	25–14	25–17	25–18		96–74	
17 Nov	14:45	Asseco Resovia	3–0	PGE GiEK Skra Bełchatów	25–23	25–20	25–16			75–59	
17 Nov	17:30	Cuprum Stilon Gorzów	0–3	PGE Projekt Warsaw	22–25	20–25	16–25			58–75	

=== 13th round ===
Date	Time		Score		Set 1	Set 2	Set 3	Set 4	Set 5	Total	Report
22 Nov	20:30	Indykpol AZS Olsztyn	3–0	Bogdanka LUK Lublin	25–19	25–21	30–28			80–68	
23 Nov	14:45	ZAKSA Kędzierzyn-Koźle	3–1	Barkom-Kazhany Lviv	25–18	24–26	25–14	25–17		99–75	
23 Nov	17:30	PGE GiEK Skra Bełchatów	3–1	GKS Katowice	25–20	26–24	22–25	25–22		98–91	
24 Nov	14:45	Ślepsk Malow Suwałki	3–2	Asseco Resovia	21–25	25–13	19–25	25–18	16–14	106–95	
24 Nov	17:30	MKS Będzin	0–3	Aluron CMC Warta Zawiercie	21–25	23–25	19–25			63–75	
24 Nov	20:30	PSG Stal Nysa	0–3	Jastrzębski Węgiel	23–25	22–25	22–25			67–75	
25 Nov	17:30	Trefl Gdańsk	1–3	PGE Projekt Warsaw	25–23	18–25	20–25	21–25		84–98	
25 Nov	20:30	Cuprum Stilon Gorzów	3–2	Norwid Częstochowa	21–25	27–25	25–16	23–25	15–10	111–101	

=== 14th round ===
Date	Time		Score		Set 1	Set 2	Set 3	Set 4	Set 5	Total	Report
28 Nov	20:30	PGE Projekt Warsaw	3–2	PGE GiEK Skra Bełchatów	25–17	19–25	23–25	28–26	17–15	112–108	
29 Nov	17:30	GKS Katowice	1–3	Ślepsk Malow Suwałki	18–25	21–25	25–22	19–25		83–97	
29 Nov	20:30	Aluron CMC Warta Zawiercie	3–0	PSG Stal Nysa	25–19	25–22	27–25			77–66	
30 Nov	14:45	Asseco Resovia	2–3	ZAKSA Kędzierzyn-Koźle	11–25	28–26	20–25	31–29	18–20	108–125	
30 Nov	17:30	Bogdanka LUK Lublin	0–3	Jastrzębski Węgiel	30–32	23–25	16–25			69–82	
1 Dec	14:45	Barkom-Kazhany Lviv	3–0	MKS Będzin	25–21	25–18	25–14			75–53	
1 Dec	17:30	Indykpol AZS Olsztyn	3–0	Cuprum Stilon Gorzów	25–22	25–21	25–21			75–64	
2 Dec	20:30	Norwid Częstochowa	2–3	Trefl Gdańsk	23–25	27–25	24–26	25–19	13–15	112–110	

=== 15th round ===
Date	Time		Score		Set 1	Set 2	Set 3	Set 4	Set 5	Total	Report
6 Dec	20:30	Cuprum Stilon Gorzów	0–3	Bogdanka LUK Lublin	21–25	21–25	24–26			66–76	
7 Dec	14:45	Ślepsk Malow Suwałki	3–2	PGE Projekt Warsaw	25–21	21–25	17–25	25–21	16–18	104–110	
7 Dec	17:30	PSG Stal Nysa	3–1	Barkom-Kazhany Lviv	25–22	19–25	25–20	25–18		94–85	
7 Dec	20:30	ZAKSA Kędzierzyn-Koźle	3–1	GKS Katowice	25–20	20–25	25–22	25–17		95–84	
8 Dec	14:45	Aluron CMC Warta Zawiercie	0–3	Jastrzębski Węgiel	22–25	25–27	22–25			69–77	
8 Dec	17:30	Indykpol AZS Olsztyn	3–0	Trefl Gdańsk	28–26	25–17	25–19			78–62	
8 Dec	20:30	PGE GiEK Skra Bełchatów	1–3	Norwid Częstochowa	24–26	20–25	25–21	21–25		90–97	
9 Dec	20:30	MKS Będzin	1–3	Asseco Resovia	26–28	25–22	19–25	22–25		92–100	

=== 16th round ===
Date	Time		Score		Set 1	Set 2	Set 3	Set 4	Set 5	Total	Report
12 Dec	17:30	ZAKSA Kędzierzyn-Koźle	0–3	PGE Projekt Warsaw	20–25	19–25	21–25			60–75	
13 Dec	20:30	MKS Będzin	2–3	GKS Katowice	25–18	25–22	19–25	19–25	12–15	100–105	
14 Dec	14:45	Bogdanka LUK Lublin	2–3	Aluron CMC Warta Zawiercie	18–25	25–18	19–25	25–21	12–15	99–104	
14 Dec	17:30	PGE GiEK Skra Bełchatów	3–2	Indykpol AZS Olsztyn	25–17	15–25	19–25	30–28	17–15	106–110	
14 Dec	20:30	Jastrzębski Węgiel	2–3	Barkom-Kazhany Lviv	20–25	25–27	25–21	25–13	13–15	108–101	
15 Dec	14:45	PSG Stal Nysa	1–3	Asseco Resovia	23–25	23–25	30–28	19–25		95–103	
15 Dec	17:30	Ślepsk Malow Suwałki	3–2	Norwid Częstochowa	26–24	24–26	20–25	25–21	18–16	113–112	
16 Dec	20:30	Trefl Gdańsk	3–0	Cuprum Stilon Gorzów	25–23	33–31	27–25			85–79	

=== 17th round ===
Date	Time		Score		Set 1	Set 2	Set 3	Set 4	Set 5	Total	Report
19 Dec	17:30	Cuprum Stilon Gorzów	1–3	PGE GiEK Skra Bełchatów	25–19	20–25	20–25	23–25		88–94	
20 Dec	20:30	Norwid Częstochowa	0–3	ZAKSA Kędzierzyn-Koźle	22–25	23–25	26–28			71–78	
21 Dec	14:45	Asseco Resovia	0–3	Jastrzębski Węgiel	21–25	22–25	23–25			66–75	
21 Dec	17:30	Indykpol AZS Olsztyn	3–1	Ślepsk Malow Suwałki	22–25	25–16	25–18	31–29		103–88	
21 Dec	20:30	Barkom-Kazhany Lviv	1–3	Aluron CMC Warta Zawiercie	26–28	24–26	25–23	19–25		94–102	
22 Dec	14:45	Trefl Gdańsk	0–3	Bogdanka LUK Lublin	15–25	16–25	22–25			53–75	
22 Dec	17:30	PGE Projekt Warsaw	3–0	MKS Będzin	25–21	25–19	26–24			76–64	
22 Dec	20:30	PSG Stal Nysa	3–1	GKS Katowice	25–16	20–25	25–15	25–19		95–75	

=== 18th round ===
Date	Time		Score		Set 1	Set 2	Set 3	Set 4	Set 5	Total	Report
28 Dec	14:45	Bogdanka LUK Lublin	3–1	Barkom-Kazhany Lviv	26–24	22–25	25–16	25–15		98–80	
28 Dec	17:30	MKS Będzin	0–3	Norwid Częstochowa	15–25	16–25	12–25			43–75	
29 Dec	14:45	PSG Stal Nysa	0–3	PGE Projekt Warsaw	27–29	22–25	23–25			72–79	
29 Dec	17:30	Ślepsk Malow Suwałki	0–3	Cuprum Stilon Gorzów	21–25	24–26	22–25			67–76	
29 Dec	20:30	Trefl Gdańsk	3–0	PGE GiEK Skra Bełchatów	29–27	25–23	25–21			79–71	
30 Dec	17:30	Aluron CMC Warta Zawiercie	3–1	Asseco Resovia	22–25	25–19	26–24	25–21		98–89	
30 Dec	20:30	Jastrzębski Węgiel	3–0	GKS Katowice	25–23	28–26	25–16			78–65	
27 Feb	20:30	ZAKSA Kędzierzyn-Koźle	3–0	Indykpol AZS Olsztyn	25–16	26–24	25–15			76–55	

=== 19th round ===
Date	Time		Score		Set 1	Set 2	Set 3	Set 4	Set 5	Total	Report
3 Jan	20:30	Norwid Częstochowa	3–0	PSG Stal Nysa	25–21	25–17	25–19			75–57	
4 Jan	12:30	GKS Katowice	1–3	Aluron CMC Warta Zawiercie	25–21	20–25	21–25	14–25		80–96	
4 Jan	14:45	PGE GiEK Skra Bełchatów	2–3	Bogdanka LUK Lublin	25–23	25–18	20–25	12–25	13–15	95–106	
4 Jan	17:30	Indykpol AZS Olsztyn	3–0	MKS Będzin	31–29	25–17	25–23			81–69	
5 Jan	14:45	Trefl Gdańsk	0–3	Ślepsk Malow Suwałki	21–25	21–25	23–25			65–75	
5 Jan	17:30	Cuprum Stilon Gorzów	1–3	ZAKSA Kędzierzyn-Koźle	19–25	20–25	25–21	25–27		89–98	
6 Jan	17:30	PGE Projekt Warsaw	3–2	Jastrzębski Węgiel	21–25	20–25	25–20	25–19	15–10	106–99	
6 Jan	20:30	Asseco Resovia	2–3	Barkom-Kazhany Lviv	23–25	17–25	25–20	25–21	14–16	104–107	

=== 20th round ===
Date	Time		Score		Set 1	Set 2	Set 3	Set 4	Set 5	Total	Report
9 Jan	17:30	Barkom-Kazhany Lviv	0–3	GKS Katowice	20–25	24–26	21–25			65–76	
10 Jan	20:30	MKS Będzin	0–3	Cuprum Stilon Gorzów	23–25	22–25	30–32			75–82	
11 Jan	14:45	Aluron CMC Warta Zawiercie	3–1	PGE Projekt Warsaw	25–17	25–20	19–25	25–21		94–83	
11 Jan	17:30	Asseco Resovia	3–2	Bogdanka LUK Lublin	21–25	25–22	23–25	25–15	15–13	109–100	
12 Jan	14:45	Jastrzębski Węgiel	3–1	Norwid Częstochowa	25–23	21–25	25–17	25–23		96–88	
12 Jan	17:30	PSG Stal Nysa	3–2	Indykpol AZS Olsztyn	21–25	20–25	25–19	25–22	15–12	106–103	
12 Jan	20:30	Ślepsk Malow Suwałki	3–2	PGE GiEK Skra Bełchatów	23–25	25–19	16–25	25–18	15–11	104–98	
13 Jan	17:30	ZAKSA Kędzierzyn-Koźle	3–1	Trefl Gdańsk	25–16	23–25	25–22	25–16		98–79	

=== 21st round ===
Date	Time		Score		Set 1	Set 2	Set 3	Set 4	Set 5	Total	Report
17 Jan	20:30	Cuprum Stilon Gorzów	3–2	PSG Stal Nysa	25–17	22–25	30–28	19–25	16–14	112–109	
18 Jan	14:45	Norwid Częstochowa	3–2	Aluron CMC Warta Zawiercie	30–28	23–25	22–25	25–20	15–12	115–110	
18 Jan	17:30	GKS Katowice	0–3	Asseco Resovia	18–25	18–25	17–25			53–75	
18 Jan	20:30	Trefl Gdańsk	3–1	MKS Będzin	27–29	25–21	25–18	25–15		102–83	
19 Jan	14:45	PGE GiEK Skra Bełchatów	2–3	ZAKSA Kędzierzyn-Koźle	25–21	22–25	27–25	15–25	12–15	101–111	
19 Jan	17:30	Ślepsk Malow Suwałki	2–3	Bogdanka LUK Lublin	25–23	25–21	18–25	23–25	17–19	108–113	
21 Jan	17:30	Indykpol AZS Olsztyn	1–3	Jastrzębski Węgiel	20–25	25–19	23–25	23–25		91–94	
21 Jan	20:30	PGE Projekt Warsaw	3–1	Barkom-Kazhany Lviv	25–22	27–29	25–16	25–16		102–83	

=== 22nd round ===
Date	Time		Score		Set 1	Set 2	Set 3	Set 4	Set 5	Total	Report
23 Jan	17:30	MKS Będzin	0–3	PGE GiEK Skra Bełchatów	17–25	20–25	21–25			58–75	
24 Jan	17:30	PSG Stal Nysa	2–3	Trefl Gdańsk	25–21	25–17	22–25	26–28	8–15	106–106	
24 Jan	20:30	Indykpol AZS Olsztyn	1–3	Aluron CMC Warta Zawiercie	19–25	18–25	25–20	21–25		83–95	
25 Jan	14:45	Asseco Resovia	3–0	PGE Projekt Warsaw	25–23	26–24	25–21			76–68	
25 Jan	17:30	Jastrzębski Węgiel	3–0	Cuprum Stilon Gorzów	25–21	25–17	25–18			75–56	
25 Jan	20:30	Bogdanka LUK Lublin	3–1	GKS Katowice	27–25	25–15	22–25	25–22		99–87	
26 Jan	14:45	ZAKSA Kędzierzyn-Koźle	3–1	Ślepsk Malow Suwałki	22–25	25–15	25–23	25–16		97–79	
27 Jan	17:30	Barkom-Kazhany Lviv	3–1	Norwid Częstochowa	23–25	25–20	25–23	25–21		98–89	

=== 23rd round ===
Date	Time		Score		Set 1	Set 2	Set 3	Set 4	Set 5	Total	Report
31 Jan	20:30	PGE GiEK Skra Bełchatów	3–0	PSG Stal Nysa	25–20	27–25	25–22			77–67	
1 Feb	14:45	ZAKSA Kędzierzyn-Koźle	3–2	Bogdanka LUK Lublin	25–20	25–14	23–25	22–25	15–11	110–95	
1 Feb	17:30	GKS Katowice	1–3	PGE Projekt Warsaw	21–25	25–22	22–25	15–25		83–97	
1 Feb	20:30	Indykpol AZS Olsztyn	3–1	Barkom-Kazhany Lviv	25–16	25–22	19–25	25–21		94–84	
2 Feb	14:45	Norwid Częstochowa	1–3	Asseco Resovia	21–25	25–20	25–27	23–25		94–97	
2 Feb	17:30	Trefl Gdańsk	1–3	Jastrzębski Węgiel	19–25	25–21	20–25	23–25		87–96	
2 Feb	20:30	Cuprum Stilon Gorzów	0–3	Aluron CMC Warta Zawiercie	23–25	21–25	22–25			66–75	
3 Feb	17:30	Ślepsk Malow Suwałki	3–1	MKS Będzin	25–19	25–23	26–28	25–17		101–87	

=== 24th round ===
Date	Time		Score		Set 1	Set 2	Set 3	Set 4	Set 5	Total	Report
6 Feb	17:30	Barkom-Kazhany Lviv	3–1	Cuprum Stilon Gorzów	20–25	26–24	28–26	25–21		99–96	
7 Feb	20:30	Bogdanka LUK Lublin	2–3	PGE Projekt Warsaw	25–19	25–11	23–25	20–25	15–17	108–97	
8 Feb	14:45	Aluron CMC Warta Zawiercie	3–0	Trefl Gdańsk	25–16	25–19	25–20			75–55	
8 Feb	17:30	Asseco Resovia	3–0	Indykpol AZS Olsztyn	25–15	25–22	26–24			76–61	
8 Feb	20:30	GKS Katowice	3–1	Norwid Częstochowa	25–22	25–19	22–25	25–16		97–82	
9 Feb	14:45	Jastrzębski Węgiel	1–3	PGE GiEK Skra Bełchatów	25–23	21–25	26–28	22–25		94–101	
9 Feb	17:30	PSG Stal Nysa	3–2	Ślepsk Malow Suwałki	24–26	25–21	21–25	25–21	17–15	112–108	
10 Feb	20:30	MKS Będzin	0–3	ZAKSA Kędzierzyn-Koźle	19–25	18–25	23–25			60–75	

=== 25th round ===
Date	Time		Score		Set 1	Set 2	Set 3	Set 4	Set 5	Total	Report
13 Feb	17:30	ZAKSA Kędzierzyn-Koźle	3–2	PSG Stal Nysa	24–26	25–16	25–17	23–25	15–12	112–96	
14 Feb	17:30	PGE GiEK Skra Bełchatów	3–1	Aluron CMC Warta Zawiercie	25–22	17–25	25–22	25–19		92–88	
14 Feb	20:30	Norwid Częstochowa	0–3	PGE Projekt Warsaw	23–25	22–25	17–25			62–75	
15 Feb	12:30	Ślepsk Malow Suwałki	0–3	Jastrzębski Węgiel	21–25	18–25	16–25			55–75	
15 Feb	20:30	Indykpol AZS Olsztyn	3–1	GKS Katowice	25–20	25–18	21–25	25–22		96–85	
16 Feb	18:00	MKS Będzin	0–3	Bogdanka LUK Lublin	17–25	13–25	20–25			50–75	
16 Feb	20:30	Cuprum Stilon Gorzów	1–3	Asseco Resovia	26–28	25–23	24–26	16–25		91–102	
17 Feb	17:30	Trefl Gdańsk	3–0	Barkom-Kazhany Lviv	25–19	25–22	25–16			75–57	

=== 26th round ===
Date	Time		Score		Set 1	Set 2	Set 3	Set 4	Set 5	Total	Report
21 Feb	17:30	Asseco Resovia	3–2	Trefl Gdańsk	22–25	25–19	25–17	21–25	21–19	114–105	
22 Feb	14:45	Aluron CMC Warta Zawiercie	3–0	Ślepsk Malow Suwałki	25–17	25–15	25–19			75–51	
22 Feb	17:30	PSG Stal Nysa	3–1	MKS Będzin	25–17	25–10	22–25	25–23		97–75	
22 Feb	20:30	GKS Katowice	3–2	Cuprum Stilon Gorzów	25–21	30–32	18–25	25–23	16–14	114–115	
23 Feb	14:45	Jastrzębski Węgiel	3–0	ZAKSA Kędzierzyn-Koźle	25–21	25–22	25–19			75–62	
23 Feb	17:30	PGE Projekt Warsaw	3–1	Indykpol AZS Olsztyn	25–23	22–25	25–13	25–19		97–80	
23 Feb	20:30	Bogdanka LUK Lublin	3–1	Norwid Częstochowa	25–19	17–25	25–21	25–20		92–85	
24 Feb	17:30	Barkom-Kazhany Lviv	2–3	PGE GiEK Skra Bełchatów	25–23	21–25	25–23	23–25	11–15	105–111	

=== 27th round ===
Date	Time		Score		Set 1	Set 2	Set 3	Set 4	Set 5	Total	Report
28 Feb	17:30	PGE Projekt Warsaw	3–1	Cuprum Stilon Gorzów	25–15	17–25	25–21	25–17		92–78	
28 Feb	20:30	Ślepsk Malow Suwałki	3–1	Barkom-Kazhany Lviv	26–24	17–25	30–28	25–23		98–100	
1 Mar	12:30	MKS Będzin	1–3	Jastrzębski Węgiel	25–21	20–25	14–25	22–25		81–96	
1 Mar	14:45	PGE GiEK Skra Bełchatów	0–3	Asseco Resovia	16–25	21–25	21–25			58–75	
1 Mar	17:30	PSG Stal Nysa	0–3	Bogdanka LUK Lublin	10–25	20–25	17–25			47–75	
2 Mar	14:45	ZAKSA Kędzierzyn-Koźle	0–3	Aluron CMC Warta Zawiercie	15–25	23–25	23–25			61–75	
2 Mar	17:30	Trefl Gdańsk	3–2	GKS Katowice	23–25	25–16	18–25	25–20	15–11	106–97	
3 Mar	17:30	Indykpol AZS Olsztyn	1–3	Norwid Częstochowa	27–29	17–25	25–14	24–26		93–94	

=== 28th round ===
Date	Time		Score		Set 1	Set 2	Set 3	Set 4	Set 5	Total	Report
6 Mar	17:30	Barkom-Kazhany Lviv	1–3	ZAKSA Kędzierzyn-Koźle	20–25	22–25	29–27	17–25		88–102	
6 Mar	20:30	Aluron CMC Warta Zawiercie	3–2	MKS Będzin	25–11	17–25	25–19	26–28	15–5	108–88	
8 Mar	14:45	PGE Projekt Warsaw	3–0	Trefl Gdańsk	25–22	25–21	25–19			75–62	
8 Mar	17:30	Asseco Resovia	3–1	Ślepsk Malow Suwałki	25–16	18–25	25–20	28–26		96–87	
8 Mar	20:30	Bogdanka LUK Lublin	3–0	Indykpol AZS Olsztyn	25–23	25–21	25–12			75–56	
9 Mar	14:45	Jastrzębski Węgiel	3–0	PSG Stal Nysa	25–19	28–26	25–19			78–64	
9 Mar	17:30	Norwid Częstochowa	3–1	Cuprum Stilon Gorzów	25–14	22–25	25–19	25–22		97–80	
10 Mar	20:30	GKS Katowice	0–3	PGE GiEK Skra Bełchatów	21–25	21–25	19–25			61–75	

=== 29th round ===
Date	Time		Score		Set 1	Set 2	Set 3	Set 4	Set 5	Total	Report
4 Mar	17:30	Ślepsk Malow Suwałki	3–0	GKS Katowice	25–18	25–17	29–27			79–62	
14 Mar	17:30	Cuprum Stilon Gorzów	1–3	Indykpol AZS Olsztyn	25–21	23–25	19–25	18–25		85–96	
14 Mar	20:30	PSG Stal Nysa	0–3	Aluron CMC Warta Zawiercie	19–25	20–25	16–25			55–75	
15 Mar	14:45	Jastrzębski Węgiel	3–1	Bogdanka LUK Lublin	27–29	25–21	25–20	25–23		102–93	
15 Mar	17:30	ZAKSA Kędzierzyn-Koźle	2–3	Asseco Resovia	29–27	29–27	18–25	23–25	9–15	108–119	
15 Mar	20:30	MKS Będzin	1–3	Barkom-Kazhany Lviv	25–23	19–25	18–25	18–25		80–98	
16 Mar	17:30	PGE GiEK Skra Bełchatów	1–3	PGE Projekt Warsaw	21–25	25–21	23–25	22–25		91–96	
17 Mar	17:30	Trefl Gdańsk	0–3	Norwid Częstochowa	23–25	18–25	22–25			63–75	

=== 30th round ===
Date	Time		Score		Set 1	Set 2	Set 3	Set 4	Set 5	Total	Report
20 Mar	17:30	Barkom-Kazhany Lviv	3–1	PSG Stal Nysa	25–22	24–26	25–21	25–14		99–83	
21 Mar	20:30	GKS Katowice	0–3	ZAKSA Kędzierzyn-Koźle	19–25	8–25	16–25			43–75	
22 Mar	14:45	Jastrzębski Węgiel	0–3	Aluron CMC Warta Zawiercie	22–25	32–34	20–25			74–84	
22 Mar	17:30	Norwid Częstochowa	0–3	PGE GiEK Skra Bełchatów	20–25	12–25	12–25			44–75	
22 Mar	20:30	PGE Projekt Warsaw	3–0	Ślepsk Malow Suwałki	25–17	25–18	25–23			75–58	
23 Mar	14:45	Trefl Gdańsk	0–3	Indykpol AZS Olsztyn	22–25	21–25	16–25			59–75	
23 Mar	17:30	Asseco Resovia	3–0	MKS Będzin	25–16	25–21	25–19			75–56	
24 Mar	17:30	Bogdanka LUK Lublin	3–1	Cuprum Stilon Gorzów	25–22	25–20	23–25	25–19		98–86	

== Playoffs ==
Quarterfinals
Jastrzębski Węgiel (1)	3	3
Norwid Częstochowa (8)	0	2
ZAKSA Kędzierzyn-Koźle (5)	3	0	0
Bogdanka LUK Lublin (4)	1	3	3
Aluron CMC Warta Zawiercie (3)	3	3
Asseco Resovia (6)	1	0
PGE GiEK Skra Bełchatów (7)	0	2
PGE Projekt Warsaw (2)	3	3

Semifinals
Jastrzębski Węgiel (1)	1	3	2
Bogdanka LUK Lublin (4)	3	1	3
Aluron CMC Warta Zawiercie (3)	2	3	3
PGE Projekt Warsaw (2)	3	2	2

Final
Bogdanka LUK Lublin (4)	3	3	1	3
Aluron CMC Warta Zawiercie (3)	0	0	3	0

=== Quarterfinals ===
- (to 2 victories)

==== Quarterfinal A ====
Date	Time		Score		Set 1	Set 2	Set 3	Set 4	Set 5	Total	Report
28 Mar	17:30	Jastrzębski Węgiel	3–0	Norwid Częstochowa	25–17	25–19	26–24			76–60	
1 Apr	17:30	Norwid Częstochowa	2–3	Jastrzębski Węgiel	25–19	25–23	18–25	20–25	12–15	100–107	

==== Quarterfinal B ====
Date	Time		Score		Set 1	Set 2	Set 3	Set 4	Set 5	Total	Report
29 Mar	17:30	Bogdanka LUK Lublin	1–3	ZAKSA Kędzierzyn-Koźle	25–23	17–25	20–25	19–25		81–98	
1 Apr	20:30	ZAKSA Kędzierzyn-Koźle	0–3	Bogdanka LUK Lublin	15–25	21–25	20–25			56–75	
6 Apr	14:45	Bogdanka LUK Lublin	3–0	ZAKSA Kędzierzyn-Koźle	25–21	25–21	26–24			76–66	

==== Quarterfinal C ====
Date	Time		Score		Set 1	Set 2	Set 3	Set 4	Set 5	Total	Report
29 Mar	14:45	Aluron CMC Warta Zawiercie	3–1	Asseco Resovia	25–21	25–18	21–25	25–21		96–85	
5 Apr	14:45	Asseco Resovia	0–3	Aluron CMC Warta Zawiercie	25–27	18–25	18–25			61–77	

==== Quarterfinal D ====
Date	Time		Score		Set 1	Set 2	Set 3	Set 4	Set 5	Total	Report
28 Mar	20:30	PGE Projekt Warsaw	3–0	PGE GiEK Skra Bełchatów	25–23	25–23	27–25			77–71	
5 Apr	17:30	PGE GiEK Skra Bełchatów	2–3	PGE Projekt Warsaw	19–25	25–19	18–25	25–20	21–23	108–112	

=== Semifinals ===
- (to 2 victories)

==== Semifinal A ====
Date	Time		Score		Set 1	Set 2	Set 3	Set 4	Set 5	Total	Report
18 Apr	20:30	Jastrzębski Węgiel	1–3	Bogdanka LUK Lublin	25–23	22–25	18–25	22–25		87–98	
23 Apr	20:30	Bogdanka LUK Lublin	1–3	Jastrzębski Węgiel	29–31	25–15	20–25	22–25		96–96	
26 Apr	14:45	Jastrzębski Węgiel	2–3	Bogdanka LUK Lublin	22–25	25–20	24–26	25–23	9–15	105–109	

==== Semifinal B ====
Date	Time		Score		Set 1	Set 2	Set 3	Set 4	Set 5	Total	Report
19 Apr	14:45	PGE Projekt Warsaw	3–2	Aluron CMC Warta Zawiercie	25–22	25–20	17–25	19–25	15–12	101–104	
23 Apr	17:30	Aluron CMC Warta Zawiercie	3–2	PGE Projekt Warsaw	25–14	25–22	23–25	22–25	16–14	111–100	
26 Apr	17:30	PGE Projekt Warsaw	2–3	Aluron CMC Warta Zawiercie	19–25	25–21	25–21	19–25	14–16	102–108	

=== Finals ===
- (to 3 victories)

Date	Time		Score		Set 1	Set 2	Set 3	Set 4	Set 5	Total	Report
30 Apr	18:00	Aluron CMC Warta Zawiercie	0–3	Bogdanka LUK Lublin	21–25	22–25	21–25			64–75	
3 May	14:45	Bogdanka LUK Lublin	3–0	Aluron CMC Warta Zawiercie	25–14	25–21	25–14			75–49	
7 May	20:30	Aluron CMC Warta Zawiercie	3–1	Bogdanka LUK Lublin	25–20	25–20	20–25	29–27		99–92	
10 May	17:30	Bogdanka LUK Lublin	3–0	Aluron CMC Warta Zawiercie	25–22	25–15	25–18			75–55	

== Placement matches ==
=== 5th place ===
- (to 2 victories)

Date	Time		Score		Set 1	Set 2	Set 3	Set 4	Set 5	Total	Report
19 Apr	17:30	Asseco Resovia	1–3	ZAKSA Kędzierzyn-Koźle	25–20	22–25	22–25	18–25		87–95	
25 Apr	20:30	ZAKSA Kędzierzyn-Koźle	3–2	Asseco Resovia	23–25	23–25	25–19	25–18	16–14	112–101	

=== 3rd place ===
- (to 3 victories)

Date	Time		Score		Set 1	Set 2	Set 3	Set 4	Set 5	Total	Report
30 Apr	20:45	Jastrzębski Węgiel	0–3	PGE Projekt Warsaw	22–25	22–25	21–25			65–75	
4 May	20:30	PGE Projekt Warsaw	3–1	Jastrzębski Węgiel	28–30	26–24	25–21	25–20		104–95	
7 May	17:30	Jastrzębski Węgiel	2–3	PGE Projekt Warsaw	25–21	19–25	22–25	25–23	12–15	103–109	

== Final standings ==
Qualified for the 2025–26 CEV Champions League
Qualified for the 2025–26 CEV Cup
Qualified for the 2025–26 CEV Challenge Cup
Relegation to the 1st league

Rank	Team
1st place, gold medalist(s)	Bogdanka LUK Lublin
2nd place, silver medalist(s)	Aluron CMC Warta Zawiercie
3rd place, bronze medalist(s)	PGE Projekt Warsaw
4	Jastrzębski Węgiel
5	ZAKSA Kędzierzyn-Koźle
6	Asseco Resovia
7	PGE GiEK Skra Bełchatów
8	Norwid Częstochowa
9	Indykpol AZS Olsztyn
10	Ślepsk Malow Suwałki
11	Trefl Gdańsk
12	Cuprum Stilon Gorzów
13	Barkom-Kazhany Lviv
14	PSG Stal Nysa
15	GKS Katowice
16	MKS Będzin

2025 Polish champions

1st title

== Squads ==
Aluron CMC Warta Zawiercie
No.	Name	Date of birth	Height	Position
2	(Poland) Bartosz Kwolek	17 July 1997	1.93 m (6 ft 4 in)	outside hitter
3	(United States) Aaron Russell	4 June 1993	2.05 m (6 ft 9 in)	outside hitter
4	(Australia) Luke Perry	20 November 1995	1.80 m (5 ft 11 in)	libero
5	(Poland) Miłosz Zniszczoł	2 July 1986	2.00 m (6 ft 7 in)	middle blocker
7	(Poland) Szymon Gregorowicz	7 March 1994	1.83 m (6 ft 0 in)	libero
9	(Germany) György Grozer	27 November 1984	2.00 m (6 ft 7 in)	opposite
11	(Poland) Jakub Nowosielski	11 February 1993	1.93 m (6 ft 4 in)	setter
12	(Poland) Adrian Markiewicz	12 April 2002	2.13 m (7 ft 0 in)	middle blocker
13	(Poland) Yuriy Gladyr	8 July 1984	2.02 m (6 ft 8 in)	middle blocker
15	(Portugal) Miguel Tavares	2 March 1993	1.92 m (6 ft 4 in)	setter
20	(Poland) Mateusz Bieniek	5 April 1994	2.10 m (6 ft 11 in)	middle blocker
21	(Poland) Karol Butryn	18 June 1993	1.93 m (6 ft 4 in)	opposite
27	(Poland) Wiktor Rajsner	13 April 1999	2.05 m (6 ft 9 in)	middle blocker
30	(Iran) Mobin Nasri	7 January 2003	2.01 m (6 ft 7 in)	outside hitter
55	(United States) Kyle Ensing	6 March 1997	2.01 m (6 ft 7 in)	opposite
99	(Poland) Patryk Łaba	30 July 1991	1.88 m (6 ft 2 in)	outside hitter
Head coach:		(Poland) Michał Winiarski		

Asseco Resovia
No.	Name	Date of birth	Height	Position
1	(Poland) Patryk Niemiec	18 February 1997	2.02 m (6 ft 8 in)	middle blocker
2	(Poland) Dawid Woch	16 May 1997	2.00 m (6 ft 7 in)	middle blocker
4	(Poland) Krzysztof Rejno	22 February 1993	2.03 m (6 ft 8 in)	middle blocker
5	(Poland) Jakub Bucki	13 August 1988	1.97 m (6 ft 6 in)	opposite
6	(Poland) Karol Kłos	8 August 1989	2.01 m (6 ft 7 in)	middle blocker
8	(Poland) Adrian Staszewski	31 May 1990	1.98 m (6 ft 6 in)	outside hitter
9	(France) Stéphen Boyer	10 April 1996	1.96 m (6 ft 5 in)	opposite
10	(Poland) Bartosz Bednorz	25 July 1994	2.01 m (6 ft 7 in)	outside hitter
11	(Czech Republic) Lukáš Vašina	6 July 1999	1.96 m (6 ft 5 in)	outside hitter
13	(Poland) Michał Potera	6 March 1988	1.83 m (6 ft 0 in)	libero
15	(Poland) Łukasz Kozub	3 November 1997	1.86 m (6 ft 1 in)	setter
16	(Poland) Paweł Zatorski	21 June 1990	1.84 m (6 ft 0 in)	libero
18	(Slovenia) Klemen Čebulj	21 February 1992	2.02 m (6 ft 8 in)	outside hitter
20	(Slovenia) Gregor Ropret	1 March 1989	1.92 m (6 ft 4 in)	setter
23	(Poland) Dawid Ogórek	30 July 1990	1.84 m (6 ft 0 in)	libero
25	(Poland) Cezary Sapiński	28 September 1994	2.03 m (6 ft 8 in)	middle blocker
Head coach:		(Finland) Tuomas Sammelvuo		

Barkom-Kazhany Lviv
No.	Name	Date of birth	Height	Position
2	(Ukraine) Illia Kovalov	31 August 1996	1.98 m (6 ft 6 in)	outside hitter
3	(Australia) Lorenzo Pope	6 December 2001	2.05 m (6 ft 9 in)	outside hitter
4	(Ukraine) Oleh Shevchenko	8 January 1993	1.94 m (6 ft 4 in)	outside hitter
6	(Finland) Santeri Välimaa	11 January 2001	1.92 m (6 ft 4 in)	setter
9	(Norway) Rune Fasteland	17 December 1995	2.05 m (6 ft 9 in)	middle blocker
11	(Estonia) Märt Tammearu	17 March 2001	1.98 m (6 ft 6 in)	outside hitter
12	(Ukraine) Vladyslav Shchurov	27 April 2001	2.07 m (6 ft 9 in)	middle blocker
13	(Ukraine) Vasyl Tupchii	13 January 1992	1.96 m (6 ft 5 in)	opposite
17	(Latvia) Deniss Petrovs	31 August 1986	1.88 m (6 ft 2 in)	setter
19	(Ukraine) Andrii Rohozhyn	13 July 1997	2.03 m (6 ft 8 in)	middle blocker
21	(Ukraine) Yaroslav Pampushko	11 January 2001	1.78 m (5 ft 10 in)	libero
23	(Ukraine) Tymur Tsmokalo	23 December 2003	1.97 m (6 ft 6 in)	opposite
29	(Ukraine) Andrii Shvets	12 May 2005	1.98 m (6 ft 6 in)	middle blocker
Head coach:		(Latvia) Uģis Krastiņš		

Bogdanka LUK Lublin
No.	Name	Date of birth	Height	Position
1	(Poland) Jan Nowakowski	17 May 1994	2.02 m (6 ft 8 in)	middle blocker
4	(Poland) Marcin Komenda	24 May 1996	1.98 m (6 ft 6 in)	setter
5	(Poland) Mikołaj Sawicki	23 November 1999	1.98 m (6 ft 6 in)	outside hitter
6	(Poland) Mateusz Malinowski	6 May 1992	1.98 m (6 ft 6 in)	opposite
7	(Poland) Jakub Wachnik	16 February 1993	2.02 m (6 ft 8 in)	outside hitter
9	(Poland) Wilfredo León	31 July 1993	2.02 m (6 ft 8 in)	outside hitter
10	(Poland) Mikołaj Słotarski	2 October 2002	1.86 m (6 ft 1 in)	setter
11	(Bulgaria) Aleks Grozdanov	28 March 1998	2.08 m (6 ft 10 in)	middle blocker
16	(Poland) Maciej Czyrek	17 December 2000	1.83 m (6 ft 0 in)	libero
17	(Brazil) Thales Hoss	26 April 1989	1.90 m (6 ft 3 in)	libero
20	(Poland) Maciej Zając	5 March 2003	1.98 m (6 ft 6 in)	middle blocker
21	(Netherlands) Bennie Tuinstra	12 September 2000	2.00 m (6 ft 7 in)	outside hitter
33	(Canada) Fynn McCarthy	4 December 1999	2.03 m (6 ft 8 in)	middle blocker
35	(Poland) Kewin Sasak	20 February 1997	2.08 m (6 ft 10 in)	opposite
Head coach:		(Italy) Massimo Botti		

Cuprum Stilon Gorzów
No.	Name	Date of birth	Height	Position
1	(Poland) Hubert Węgrzyn	6 January 2000	2.00 m (6 ft 7 in)	middle blocker
4	(Poland) Seweryn Lipiński	1 January 2001	2.00 m (6 ft 7 in)	middle blocker
5	(Poland) Wojciech Ferens	5 April 1991	1.94 m (6 ft 4 in)	outside hitter
6	(Poland) Adam Lorenc	30 October 1998	1.98 m (6 ft 6 in)	opposite
9	(Estonia) Robert Täht	15 August 1993	1.91 m (6 ft 3 in)	outside hitter
10	(Belgium) Mathijs Desmet	28 January 2000	1.98 m (6 ft 6 in)	outside hitter
11	(Poland) Marcin Kania	14 February 1996	2.03 m (6 ft 8 in)	middle blocker
16	(Brazil) Chizoba Neves	25 July 1997	2.00 m (6 ft 7 in)	opposite
18	(Poland) Maksymilian Granieczny	7 July 2005	1.77 m (5 ft 10 in)	libero
21	(Poland) Kamil Kwasowski	13 September 1990	1.97 m (6 ft 6 in)	outside hitter
92	(Poland) Kamil Dembiec	7 February 1992	1.78 m (5 ft 10 in)	libero
94	(Poland) Przemysław Stępień	7 February 1994	1.85 m (6 ft 1 in)	setter
98	(Serbia) Vuk Todorović	23 April 1998	1.90 m (6 ft 3 in)	setter
99	(Poland) Jakub Strulak	12 May 2001	2.10 m (6 ft 11 in)	middle blocker
Head coach:		(Poland) Andrzej Kowal		

GKS Katowice
No.	Name	Date of birth	Height	Position
1	(Poland) Bartłomiej Krulicki	15 September 1993	2.05 m (6 ft 9 in)	middle blocker
4	(Poland) Bartosz Mariański	26 May 1992	1.87 m (6 ft 2 in)	libero
5	(Poland) Bartosz Gomułka	30 May 2002	2.02 m (6 ft 8 in)	opposite
6	(Poland) Piotr Fenoszyn	31 August 1996	1.93 m (6 ft 4 in)	setter
8	(Poland) Krzysztof Gibek	2 July 1992	1.91 m (6 ft 3 in)	outside hitter
9	(Tunisia) Aymen Bouguerra	1 November 2001	1.98 m (6 ft 6 in)	outside hitter
10	(Poland) Damian Domagała	23 April 1998	1.99 m (6 ft 6 in)	opposite
12	(Austria) Alexander Berger	27 September 1988	1.93 m (6 ft 4 in)	outside hitter
16	(Poland) Patryk Waloch	24 April 1995	1.76 m (5 ft 9 in)	libero
21	(Ukraine) Yevhenii Kisiliuk	27 January 1995	1.97 m (6 ft 6 in)	outside hitter
23	(Poland) Dawid Ogórek	30 July 1990	1.84 m (6 ft 0 in)	libero
27	(Poland) Maciej Wóz	31 October 2000	2.04 m (6 ft 8 in)	middle blocker
33	(Poland) Łukasz Usowicz	13 August 1997	2.03 m (6 ft 8 in)	middle blocker
91	(United States) Joshua Tuaniga	18 March 1997	1.91 m (6 ft 3 in)	setter
97	(Poland) Damian Hudzik	14 May 1998	2.04 m (6 ft 8 in)	middle blocker
Head coach:		(Poland) Grzegorz Słaby → (Poland) Emil Siewiorek		

Indykpol AZS Olsztyn
No.	Name	Date of birth	Height	Position
2	(Germany) Moritz Karlitzek	12 August 1996	1.91 m (6 ft 3 in)	outside hitter
5	(Poland) Karol Jankiewicz	21 February 1996	1.85 m (6 ft 1 in)	setter
6	(Poland) Szymon Jakubiszak	13 February 1998	2.08 m (6 ft 10 in)	middle blocker
7	(Poland) Dawid Siwczyk	13 June 1993	1.97 m (6 ft 6 in)	middle blocker
9	(Poland) Nicolas Szerszeń	31 December 1996	1.95 m (6 ft 5 in)	outside hitter
10	(Poland) Jakub Majchrzak	13 May 2004	2.08 m (6 ft 10 in)	middle blocker
11	(Argentina) Manuel Armoa	1 December 2002	1.98 m (6 ft 6 in)	outside hitter
12	(Poland) Kamil Szymendera	30 April 2003	1.92 m (6 ft 4 in)	outside hitter
13	(Poland) Kacper Sienkiewicz	11 April 2005	2.02 m (6 ft 8 in)	outside hitter
14	(Poland) Kuba Hawryluk	8 September 2003	1.81 m (5 ft 11 in)	libero
15	(Poland) Jakub Ciunajtis	6 August 1998	1.77 m (5 ft 10 in)	libero
17	(Poland) Mateusz Janikowski	5 May 1999	2.01 m (6 ft 7 in)	outside hitter
19	(Poland) Paweł Cieślik	18 March 2000	1.97 m (6 ft 6 in)	middle blocker
22	(Poland) Szymon Patecki	4 April 2005	1.99 m (6 ft 6 in)	opposite
41	(Finland) Eemi Tervaportti	26 July 1989	1.93 m (6 ft 4 in)	setter
91	(Czech Republic) Jan Hadrava	3 June 1991	1.99 m (6 ft 6 in)	opposite
99	(Poland) Daniel Gąsior	9 January 1995	2.00 m (6 ft 7 in)	opposite
Head coach:		(Argentina) Juan Manuel Barrial → (Poland) Marcin Mierzejewski → (Poland) Daniel Pliński		

Jastrzębski Węgiel
No.	Name	Date of birth	Height	Position
1	(Poland) Marcin Waliński	24 October 1990	1.96 m (6 ft 5 in)	outside hitter
2	(Poland) Łukasz Kaczmarek	29 June 1994	2.04 m (6 ft 8 in)	opposite
3	(Poland) Jakub Popiwczak	17 April 1996	1.80 m (5 ft 11 in)	libero
5	(Poland) Arkadiusz Żakieta	13 October 1992	1.97 m (6 ft 6 in)	opposite
6	(France) Benjamin Toniutti	30 October 1989	1.83 m (6 ft 0 in)	setter
7	(Argentina) Luciano Vicentín	4 April 2000	1.97 m (6 ft 6 in)	outside hitter
9	(France) Timothée Carle	30 November 1995	1.98 m (6 ft 6 in)	outside hitter
10	(Argentina) Juan Ignacio Finoli	5 November 1991	1.89 m (6 ft 2 in)	setter
12	(Germany) Anton Brehme	10 August 1999	2.06 m (6 ft 9 in)	middle blocker
17	(Poland) Jakub Jurczyk	17 February 2006	1.83 m (6 ft 0 in)	libero
19	(Poland) Mateusz Kufka	8 November 2003	1.97 m (6 ft 6 in)	middle blocker
21	(Poland) Tomasz Fornal	31 August 1997	2.00 m (6 ft 7 in)	outside hitter
23	(Poland) Jordan Zaleszczyk	23 April 2002	2.03 m (6 ft 8 in)	middle blocker
99	(Poland) Norbert Huber	14 August 1998	2.07 m (6 ft 9 in)	middle blocker
Head coach:		(Argentina) Marcelo Méndez		

MKS Będzin
No.	Name	Date of birth	Height	Position
1	(Poland) Adrian Kopij	16 January 1996	1.91 m (6 ft 3 in)	outside hitter
2	(Poland) Patryk Szwaradzki	27 June 1995	1.95 m (6 ft 5 in)	opposite
4	(Poland) Filip Popiwczak	10 October 2005	1.75 m (5 ft 9 in)	libero
6	(Poland) Artur Ratajczak	18 September 1990	2.06 m (6 ft 9 in)	middle blocker
7	(Poland) Mateusz Siwicki	23 July 1996	2.00 m (6 ft 7 in)	middle blocker
10	(Serbia) Luka Tadić	10 October 2000	2.06 m (6 ft 9 in)	outside hitter
12	(Poland) Grzegorz Pająk	1 January 1987	1.96 m (6 ft 5 in)	setter
13	(Poland) Dominik Depowski	27 October 1995	2.00 m (6 ft 7 in)	outside hitter
14	(Poland) Maciej Olenderek	16 October 1992	1.78 m (5 ft 10 in)	libero
17	(Canada) Brandon Koppers	9 September 1995	2.02 m (6 ft 8 in)	outside hitter
18	(Poland) Damian Schulz	26 February 1990	2.08 m (6 ft 10 in)	opposite
20	(Poland) Bartłomiej Wójcik	24 July 1998	2.10 m (6 ft 11 in)	middle blocker
21	(Poland) Mateusz Szpernalowski	11 February 2005	1.90 m (6 ft 3 in)	setter
33	(Ukraine) Valerii Todua	30 July 1992	2.08 m (6 ft 10 in)	middle blocker
39	(Poland) Kamil Maruszczyk	13 January 1993	1.91 m (6 ft 3 in)	outside hitter
Head coach:		(Poland) Dawid Murek → (Poland) Radosław Kolanek		

Norwid Częstochowa
No.	Name	Date of birth	Height	Position
1	(Poland) Bartłomiej Lipiński	16 November 1996	2.01 m (6 ft 7 in)	outside hitter
3	(Poland) Mateusz Borkowski	18 February 2002	1.99 m (6 ft 6 in)	opposite
4	(Poland) Bartosz Schmidt	3 June 1991	2.00 m (6 ft 7 in)	middle blocker
5	(United States) Quinn Isaacson	19 February 1999	1.88 m (6 ft 2 in)	setter
6	(Poland) Daniel Popiela	29 April 2001	2.02 m (6 ft 8 in)	middle blocker
7	(Poland) Damian Radziwon	5 November 2002	2.01 m (6 ft 7 in)	middle blocker
8	(Poland) Artur Sługocki	1 May 1999	1.96 m (6 ft 5 in)	outside hitter
10	(Poland) Damian Kogut	3 January 1997	1.91 m (6 ft 3 in)	outside hitter
11	(Iran) Milad Ebadipour	17 October 1993	1.96 m (6 ft 5 in)	outside hitter
13	(Poland) Mateusz Masłowski	13 June 1997	1.85 m (6 ft 1 in)	libero
15	(Poland) Łukasz Żygadło	2 August 1979	2.01 m (6 ft 7 in)	setter
16	(Poland) Bartosz Makoś	1 August 1998	1.76 m (5 ft 9 in)	libero
17	(Poland) Tomasz Kowalski	12 June 1991	2.02 m (6 ft 8 in)	setter
23	(Czech Republic) Patrik Indra	8 December 1997	2.00 m (6 ft 7 in)	opposite
31	(Poland) Sebastian Adamczyk	28 February 1999	2.08 m (6 ft 10 in)	middle blocker
Head coach:		(Brazil) Cezar Douglas Silva		

PGE GiEK Skra Bełchatów
No.	Name	Date of birth	Height	Position
3	(Poland) Wiktor Nowak	21 May 1999	1.86 m (6 ft 1 in)	setter
4	(Poland) Rafał Buszek	28 April 1987	1.96 m (6 ft 5 in)	libero
7	(Poland) Bartłomiej Lemański	19 March 1996	2.16 m (7 ft 1 in)	middle blocker
9	(Poland) Łukasz Wiśniewski	3 February 1989	1.98 m (6 ft 6 in)	middle blocker
11	(Serbia) Miran Kujundžić	19 June 1997	1.96 m (6 ft 5 in)	outside hitter
12	(Poland) Grzegorz Łomacz	1 October 1987	1.88 m (6 ft 2 in)	setter
13	(Poland) Mateusz Nowak	29 February 2004	2.14 m (7 ft 0 in)	middle blocker
14	(Slovenia) Žiga Štern	2 January 1994	1.93 m (6 ft 4 in)	outside hitter
15	(Poland) Michał Szalacha	15 January 1994	2.02 m (6 ft 8 in)	middle blocker
16	(Romania) David Dinculescu	30 August 2004	1.95 m (6 ft 5 in)	outside hitter
17	(Iran) Amin Esmaeilnezhad	17 December 1996	2.03 m (6 ft 8 in)	opposite
18	(Serbia) Pavle Perić	7 August 1998	2.07 m (6 ft 9 in)	outside hitter
19	(Bulgaria) Radoslav Parapunov	19 June 1997	2.12 m (6 ft 11 in)	opposite
22	(Poland) Krystian Walczak	8 July 2001	2.12 m (6 ft 11 in)	opposite
59	(Poland) Kajetan Marek	6 January 1994	1.86 m (6 ft 1 in)	libero
Head coach:		(Romania) Gheorghe Crețu		

PGE Projekt Warsaw
No.	Name	Date of birth	Height	Position
1	(Poland) Jakub Kowalczyk	26 June 1986	2.00 m (6 ft 7 in)	middle blocker
4	(Poland) Jakub Kochanowski	17 July 1997	1.99 m (6 ft 6 in)	middle blocker
5	(Poland) Jan Firlej	26 September 1996	1.88 m (6 ft 2 in)	setter
6	(Germany) Tobias Brand	9 July 1998	1.95 m (6 ft 5 in)	outside hitter
7	(France) Kévin Tillie	2 November 1990	2.01 m (6 ft 7 in)	outside hitter
8	(Poland) Andrzej Wrona	27 December 1988	2.06 m (6 ft 9 in)	middle blocker
9	(Poland) Bartłomiej Bołądź	28 September 1994	2.04 m (6 ft 8 in)	opposite
10	(Ukraine) Yurii Semeniuk	12 May 1994	2.10 m (6 ft 11 in)	middle blocker
12	(Poland) Artur Szalpuk	20 March 1995	2.02 m (6 ft 8 in)	outside hitter
16	(Poland) Jędrzej Gruszczyński	13 November 1997	1.86 m (6 ft 1 in)	libero
18	(Poland) Damian Wojtaszek	7 September 1988	1.80 m (5 ft 11 in)	libero
20	(Germany) Linus Weber	1 November 1999	2.01 m (6 ft 7 in)	opposite
22	(Poland) Karol Borkowski	14 February 1998	1.95 m (6 ft 5 in)	outside hitter
85	(Poland) Michał Kozłowski	16 February 1985	1.91 m (6 ft 3 in)	setter
Head coach:		(Poland) Piotr Graban		

PSG Stal Nysa
No.	Name	Date of birth	Height	Position
1	(Morocco) Zouheir El Graoui	1 July 1994	1.97 m (6 ft 6 in)	outside hitter
2	(France) Kellian Motta Paes	24 March 2002	1.92 m (6 ft 4 in)	setter
6	(Poland) Konrad Jankowski	29 June 2002	2.03 m (6 ft 8 in)	middle blocker
8	(Poland) Dominik Kramczyński	13 January 2001	2.02 m (6 ft 8 in)	middle blocker
9	(Poland) Michał Gierżot	4 October 2001	2.06 m (6 ft 9 in)	outside hitter
10	(Poland) Remigiusz Kapica	28 September 2000	2.00 m (6 ft 7 in)	opposite
12	(Argentina) Nicolás Zerba	13 June 1999	2.04 m (6 ft 8 in)	middle blocker
14	(Poland) Jakub Abramowicz	10 April 1998	2.02 m (6 ft 8 in)	middle blocker
18	(Poland) Jakub Olejniczak	2 June 2007	1.83 m (6 ft 0 in)	libero
19	(Poland) Dawid Dulski	1 November 2002	2.10 m (6 ft 11 in)	opposite
20	(Poland) Kamil Szymura	24 January 1999	1.85 m (6 ft 1 in)	libero
66	(Poland) Kamil Kosiba	22 February 1999	2.00 m (6 ft 7 in)	outside hitter
90	(Poland) Wojciech Włodarczyk	28 October 1990	2.00 m (6 ft 7 in)	outside hitter
91	(Poland) Patryk Szczurek	6 February 1991	1.93 m (6 ft 4 in)	setter
Head coach:		(Poland) Daniel Pliński → (Italy) Francesco Petrella		

Ślepsk Malow Suwałki
No.	Name	Date of birth	Height	Position
2	(Poland) Konrad Stajer	30 May 1994	1.98 m (6 ft 6 in)	middle blocker
4	(Argentina) Joaquín Gallego	21 November 1996	2.04 m (6 ft 8 in)	middle blocker
5	(North Macedonia) Gjorgi Gjorgiev	22 May 1992	1.97 m (6 ft 6 in)	setter
8	(Brazil) Henrique Honorato	18 March 1997	1.90 m (6 ft 3 in)	outside hitter
9	(Poland) Bartosz Filipiak	27 February 1994	1.97 m (6 ft 6 in)	opposite
15	(Poland) Paweł Halaba	14 December 1995	1.94 m (6 ft 4 in)	outside hitter
17	(Poland) Bartosz Firszt	19 March 1999	1.98 m (6 ft 6 in)	outside hitter
21	(Poland) Marcin Krawiecki	21 July 1998	1.88 m (6 ft 2 in)	setter
22	(Poland) Jakub Kubacki	20 September 2005	1.71 m (5 ft 7 in)	libero
24	(Poland) Mateusz Czunkiewicz	16 December 1996	1.83 m (6 ft 0 in)	libero
25	(France) Quentin Jouffroy	7 May 1993	2.03 m (6 ft 8 in)	middle blocker
47	(Poland) Antoni Kwasigroch	27 January 2002	1.92 m (6 ft 4 in)	outside hitter
71	(Argentina) Matías Sánchez	20 September 1996	1.73 m (5 ft 8 in)	setter
95	(Poland) Jakub Macyra	22 July 1995	2.02 m (6 ft 8 in)	middle blocker
99	(Poland) Damian Wierzbicki	25 October 1992	1.98 m (6 ft 6 in)	opposite
Head coach:		(Poland) Dominik Kwapisiewicz		

Trefl Gdańsk
No.	Name	Date of birth	Height	Position
1	(Poland) Janusz Gałązka	26 April 1987	1.99 m (6 ft 6 in)	middle blocker
3	(Poland) Rafał Faryna	28 September 1994	2.00 m (6 ft 7 in)	opposite
4	(Netherlands) Gijs Jorna	30 May 1989	1.97 m (6 ft 6 in)	outside hitter
6	(Poland) Jakub Czerwiński	22 July 2001	1.95 m (6 ft 5 in)	outside hitter
7	(Poland) Paweł Pietraszko	5 October 1990	2.01 m (6 ft 7 in)	middle blocker
8	(Finland) Voitto Köykkä	9 July 1999	1.79 m (5 ft 10 in)	libero
9	(Poland) Aliaksei Nasevich	5 June 2003	1.97 m (6 ft 6 in)	opposite
10	(Poland) Kamil Droszyński	28 January 1997	1.90 m (6 ft 3 in)	setter
11	(Germany) Lukas Kampa	29 November 1986	1.93 m (6 ft 4 in)	setter
14	(Poland) Rafał Sobański	10 August 1991	1.95 m (6 ft 5 in)	outside hitter
16	(Poland) Fabian Majcherski	28 March 1997	1.75 m (5 ft 9 in)	libero
17	(Poland) Piotr Orczyk	19 March 1993	1.98 m (6 ft 6 in)	outside hitter
18	(Poland) Bartłomiej Mordyl	21 January 1995	2.01 m (6 ft 7 in)	middle blocker
22	(Poland) Moustapha M'Baye	22 January 1992	1.98 m (6 ft 6 in)	middle blocker
87	(Poland) Jakub Jarosz	10 February 1987	1.97 m (6 ft 6 in)	opposite
Head coach:		(Poland) Mariusz Sordyl		

ZAKSA Kędzierzyn-Koźle
No.	Name	Date of birth	Height	Position
1	(Poland) Bartosz Kurek	29 August 1988	2.05 m (6 ft 9 in)	opposite
2	(Poland) Kajetan Kubicki	9 February 2003	1.90 m (6 ft 3 in)	setter
5	(Poland) Marcin Janusz	31 July 1994	1.95 m (6 ft 5 in)	setter
7	(Belgium) Igor Grobelny	8 June 1993	1.94 m (6 ft 4 in)	outside hitter
10	(Poland) Mateusz Rećko	9 April 1998	1.97 m (6 ft 6 in)	opposite
12	(Norway) Andreas Takvam	4 June 1993	2.01 m (6 ft 7 in)	middle blocker
13	(Poland) Rafał Szymura	29 August 1995	1.97 m (6 ft 6 in)	outside hitter
15	(United States) David Smith	15 May 1985	2.01 m (6 ft 7 in)	middle blocker
16	(Poland) Mateusz Poręba	24 August 1999	2.04 m (6 ft 8 in)	middle blocker
18	(Poland) Maciej Nowowsiak	20 September 2001	1.88 m (6 ft 2 in)	libero
21	(Poland) Karol Urbanowicz	24 February 2001	2.00 m (6 ft 7 in)	middle blocker
22	(United States) Erik Shoji	24 August 1989	1.83 m (6 ft 0 in)	libero
23	(Poland) Jakub Szymański	25 March 1998	2.00 m (6 ft 7 in)	outside hitter
99	(Romania) Daniel Chiţigoi	10 March 2005	2.03 m (6 ft 8 in)	outside hitter
Head coach:		(Italy) Andrea Giani		

== See also ==
- 2024–25 CEV Champions League
- 2024–25 CEV Cup
- 2024–25 CEV Challenge Cup
