= Volleyball at the 2013 Mediterranean Games – Men's tournament =

Men's Volleyball at the 2013 Mediterranean Games

Medalists
gold medal	Italy (6th title)
silver medal	Tunisia
bronze medal	France

The Men's Volleyball tournament at the 2013 Mediterranean Games will be held in Mersin, Turkey from 21 June to 29 June 2013.

== Competition Formula ==
The 7 teams will be divided into two pools and will play a round-robin tournament.

The top 4 teams progress to the Semi Finals.

Pool A	Pool B
Egypt; France; Turkey	Algeria; Italy; Macedonia; Tunisia

== Preliminary round ==
=== Pool A ===
Pos	Team	Pld	W	L	Pts	SW	SL	SR	SPW	SPL	SPR
1	France	2	1	1	4	5	4	1.250	214	215	0.995
2	Turkey	2	1	1	3	4	4	1.000	199	190	1.047
3	Egypt	2	1	1	2	4	5	0.800	193	201	0.960

Date	Time		Score		Set 1	Set 2	Set 3	Set 4	Set 5	Total	Report
21-Jun	13:00	Egypt	3–2	France	24–26	25–23	23–25	25–18	15–13	112–105	
23-Jun	18:00	Turkey	3–1	Egypt	21–25	25–21	25–20	25–15		96–81	
25-Jun	18:00	France	3–1	Turkey	22–25	25–22	25–21	37–35		109–103	

=== Pool B ===
Pos	Team	Pld	W	L	Pts	SW	SL	SR	SPW	SPL	SPR
1	Italy	3	2	1	7	8	2	4.000	255	205	1.244
2	Tunisia	3	2	1	6	6	4	1.500	212	219	0.968
3	Algeria	3	2	1	5	6	5	1.200	240	243	0.988
4	Macedonia	3	0	3	0	1	9	0.111	205	245	0.837

Date	Time		Score		Set 1	Set 2	Set 3	Set 4	Set 5	Total	Report
21-Jun	15:30	Tunisia	3–0	Algeria	25–19	25–22	25–18			75–59	
21-Jun	18:00	Italy	3–0	Macedonia	25–18	25–20	25–19			75–57	
23-Jun	13:00	Tunisia	3–1	Macedonia	20–25	25–18	25–23	25–19		95–85	
23-Jun	15:30	Algeria	3–2	Italy	22–25	27–25	17–25	25–20	15–10	106–105	
25-Jun	13:00	Tunisia	0–3	Italy	17–25	10–25	15–25			42–75	
25-Jun	15:30	Macedonia	0–3	Algeria	19–25	23–25	21–25			63–75	

== Elimination round ==
=== Championship bracket ===
Semi-finals
June 27
France	1
Tunisia	3
June 27
Turkey	2
Italy	3

Final
June 29
Italy	3
Tunisia	2
Third place
June 29
Turkey	2
France	3

=== Fifth place match ===
Date	Time		Score		Set 1	Set 2	Set 3	Set 4	Set 5	Total	Report
27-Jun	13:00	Egypt	3–0	Algeria	25–14	25–19	25–20			75–53	

=== Semifinals ===
Date	Time		Score		Set 1	Set 2	Set 3	Set 4	Set 5	Total	Report
27-Jun	15:30	Turkey	2–3	Italy	25–21	19–25	15–25	25–21	12–15	96–107	
27-Jun	18:00	France	1–3	Tunisia	20–25	25–17	24–26	20–25		89–93	

=== Bronze medal match ===
Date	Time		Score		Set 1	Set 2	Set 3	Set 4	Set 5	Total	Report
29-Jun	15:00	Turkey	2–3	France	21–25	25–17	25–18	21–25	12–15	104–100	

=== Gold medal match ===
Date	Time		Score		Set 1	Set 2	Set 3	Set 4	Set 5	Total	Report
29-Jun	17:30	Italy	3–2	Tunisia	15–25	25–22	25–18	27–29	15–13	107–107	

== Final standings ==
Rank	Team	Record
1st place, gold medalist(s)	Italy	4–1
2nd place, silver medalist(s)	Tunisia	3–2
3rd place, bronze medalist(s)	France	2–2
4th	Turkey	1–3
5th	Egypt	2–1
6th	Algeria	2–2
7th	Macedonia	0–3
