= Čebulj =

Čebulj is a Slovene surname. Notable people with the surname include:

- Klemen Čebulj (born 1992), Slovenian volleyball player
- Boris Čebulj, Slovenian ice hockey player
