= Vinčić =

Vinčić is a surname. Notable people with the surname include:

- Dejan Vinčić (born 1986), Slovenian volleyball player
- Slavko Vinčić (born 1979), Slovenian football referee
