= National Theatre of Bitola =

Theatre in Bitola, North Macedonia

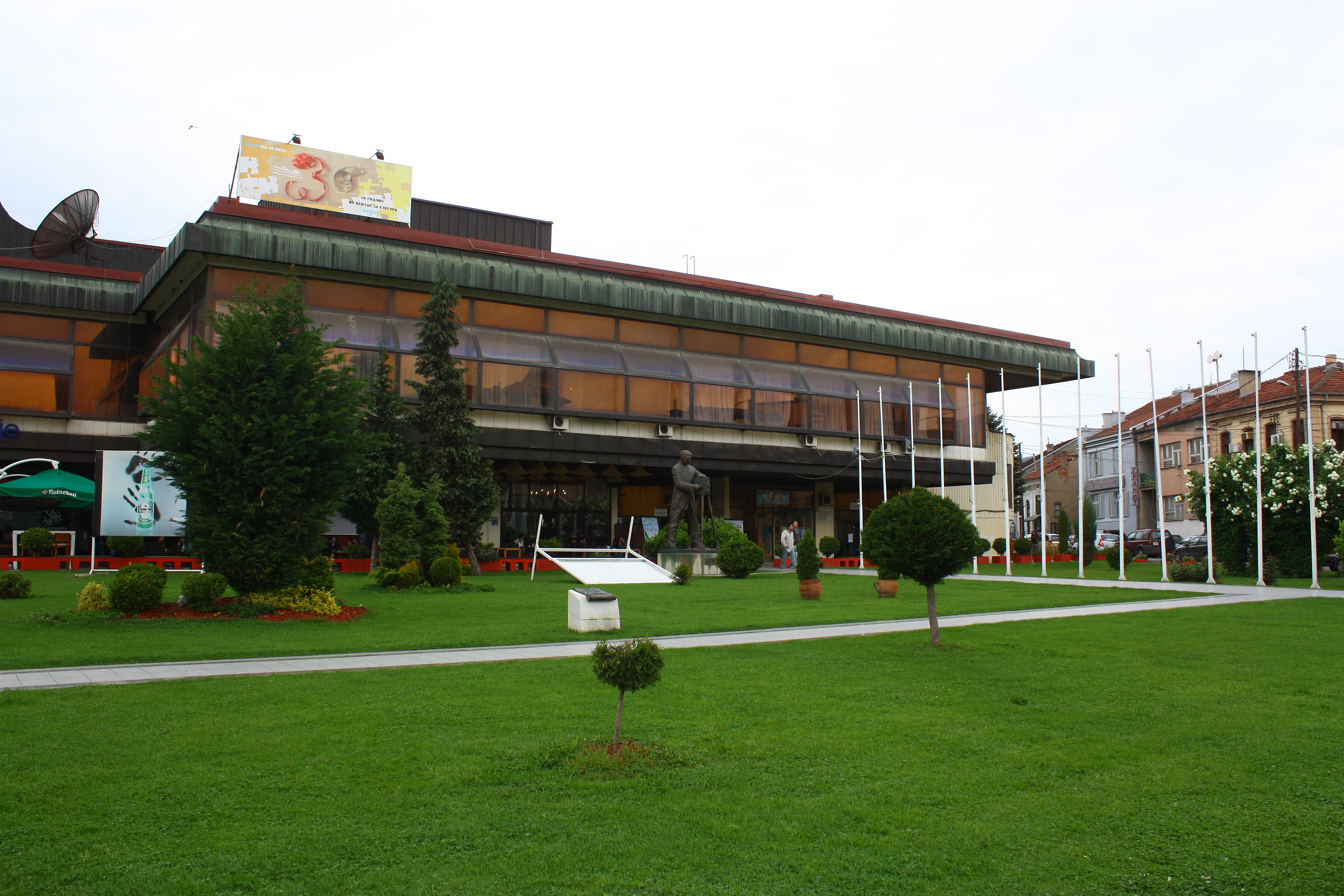
- National Theatre of Bitola
- Interactive map of National Theatre of Bitola
- Address: Širok Sokak 60; Bitola, Pelagonia; North Macedonia
- Coordinates: 41.0281°N 21.3349°E
- Type: national theatre

Website
- narodenteatarbitola.com/en/

The National Theatre of Bitola (Macedonian: Народен театар Битола, romanized: Naroden teatar Bitola), is a theatre located in Bitola in North Macedonia. Between 1945 and 2001, the National Theatre of Bitola staged more than 550 premieres and delivered over 7,000 performances, averaging approximately 200 productions per theatre season. The institution is the oldest theatre in North Macedonia.

== History ==
The present-day National Theater of Bitola can trace its history to November 14, 1944, shortly after the city's liberation at the end of World War II in Yugoslavia. Its inaugural performance was Pettoimeniot Gjore by Vlado Maleski, marking the first theatrical production in the Macedonian language.

Renovation of the old theatre building began on March 1, 1946, incorporating an expanded stage and newly added administrative offices. The refurbished theatre reopened for the 1947/48 season under the leadership of Aleksandar Tasevski. On February 28, 1953, the theatre reached a milestone with its 1,000th performance, staging Without the Third by Milan Begović, directed by Dimitrie Osmanli.

The late 1950s brought challenges, as several key artists left the institution in 1958 due to financial and personal difficulties, which led to a temporary period of decline. A major expansion plan was proposed in 1960 but was only partially realized because of financial and logistical constraints. However, a smaller-scale expansion was completed in September 1960, adding a rehearsal hall and auxiliary rooms.

On October 3, 1979, authorities decided to demolish the original theatre building, despite earlier efforts to designate it as a cultural monument. The structure was ultimately dismantled on July 30, 1980. The theatre relocated to the newly constructed House of Culture, which officially opened on October 11, 1980, and continues to serve as its home.

In 2012, together with the National Theatre in Belgrade and the National Theatre of Albania, theatre group performed Shakespeare's Henry VI trilogy in their respective languages at Globe Theatre in London. Part 1 of the play was performed by the National Theatre in Belgrade, Part 2 by the National Theatre of Albania and Part 3 by the National Theatre of Bitola. Serbian and Macedonian theatres received positive critical reviews, the first one for its historical depth in dealing with Shakespearian text and theatre in Bitola for its modern and innovative approach.

By its 70th anniversary in 2014, the theatre had staged 12,069 performances, attracting an audience of over five million visitors.
