= Macedonian Volleyball Federation =

Governing body of volleyball in North Macedonia

- Sport: Volleyball
- Jurisdiction: North Macedonia
- Founded: 1946
- Affiliation: FIVB
- Affiliation date: 1947
- Regional affiliation: CEV
- Headquarters: Skopje
- President: Petar Jovanovski

Official website
- www.vfmkd.mk
- (North Macedonia)

Macedonian Volleyball Federation (Macedonian: Одбојкарска федерација на Македонија, Odbojkarska federacija na Makedonija) is the governing body for volleyball in North Macedonia, based in Skopje. It was established in 1946 within the physical-culture association of Macedonia and became an independent sports organization on 13 February 1949. The federation is a member of the International Volleyball Federation (FIVB) and the European Volleyball Confederation (CEV).

== See also ==
- North Macedonia men's national volleyball team
- North Macedonia women's national volleyball team
