= Joško Milenkoski =

Macedonian volleyball coach

Joško Milenkoski (Macedonian: Јошко Миленкоски; born 9 September 1960) is a volleyball coach from North Macedonia, who coached Turkish national team at the 2017 Men's European Volleyball Championship.

== Clubs ==
- (North Macedonia) Borec Veles (1993–1994)
- (North Macedonia) Rabotnički (1994–2007)
- North Macedonia (1997–2008)
- (Montenegro) OK Budvanska Rivijera (2007–2008)
- (North Macedonia) Rabotnički (2008–2010)
- (Tunisia) CS Sfaxien (2010–2011)
- (Turkey) Maliye Milli Piyango SK (2011–2017)
- Turkey (2017)
- (Turkey) Ziraat Bankası Ankara (2017–2019)
- (Tunisia) CS Sfaxien (2019–2020)
- (Greece) Foinikas Syros (2021–2022)
- (Greece) PAOK (2022–2025)
- North Macedonia (2023–2024)
