= Gjorgi Gjorgiev =

Macedonian volleyball player (born 1992)

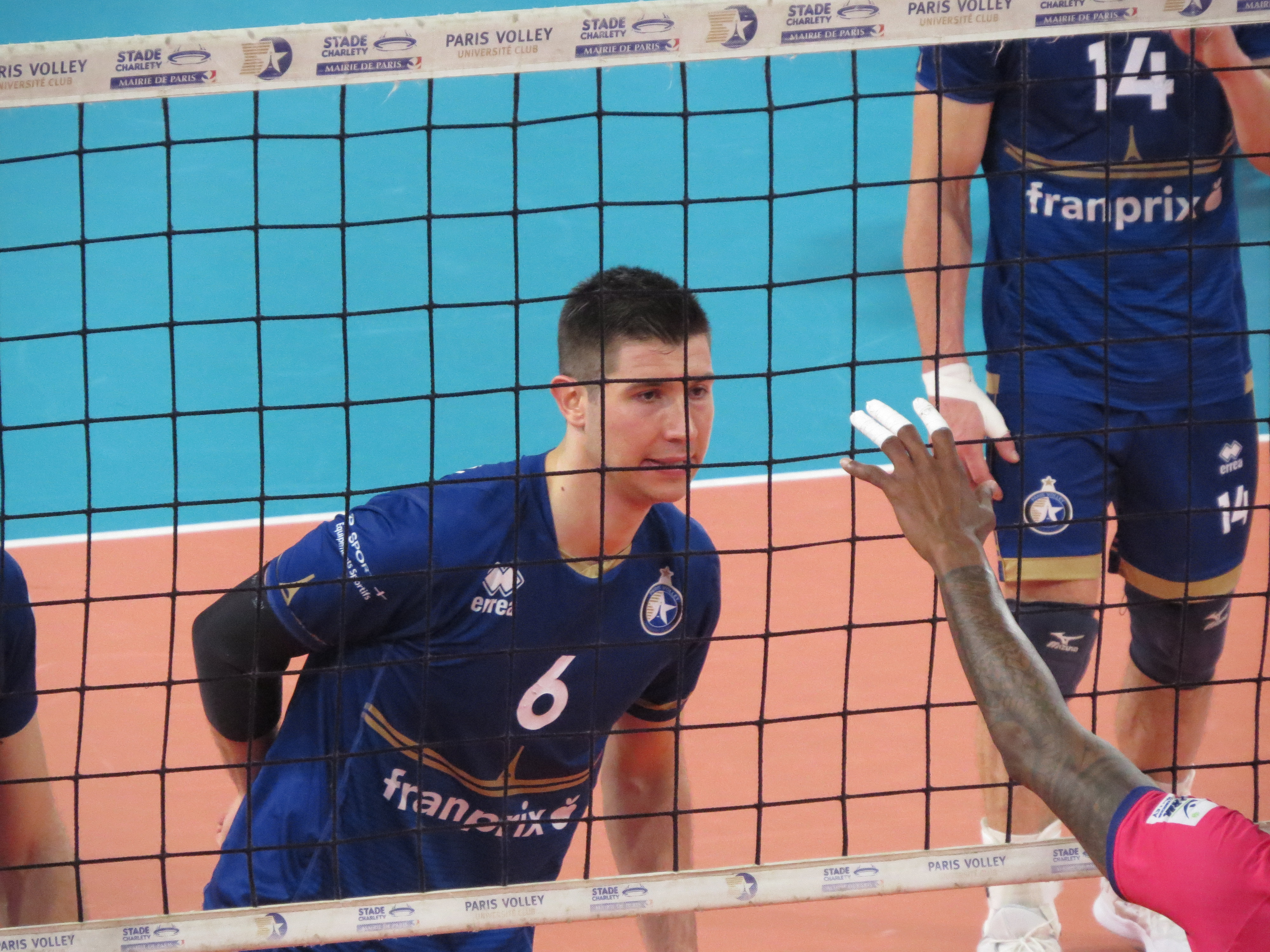

Personal information
- Nationality: Macedonian
- Born: 22 May 1992 (age 34); Strumica, Macedonia
- Height: 1.97 m (6 ft 6 in)
- Weight: 88 kg (194 lb)
- Spike: 341 cm (134 in)

Volleyball information
- Position: Setter
- Current club: Cambrai Volley
- Number: 20

Career
Years	Teams
2012–2015; 2015–2018; 2018–2020; 2020–2021; 2021–2022; 2022–	Marek Union-Ivkoni; Maliye Milli Piyango; Paris Volley; Warta Zawiercie; Hebar Pazardzhik; Cambrai Volley
Honours
Men's volleyball
Representing North Macedonia
European League
Silver medal – second place	2015 Poland
Silver medal – second place	2016 Bulgaria
Silver medal – second place	2017 Denmark

Gjorgi Gjorgiev (born 22 May 1992) is a Macedonian professional volleyball player, a member of the North Macedonia national team. He participated at the 2019 European Championship. At the professional club level, he plays for Cambrai Volley.

== Career ==
=== National team ===
In 2015, Macedonia, including Gjorgiev, met with Slovenia in the final of the 2015 European League and achieved silver medal. One year later his national team also made it to the final but was beaten by Estonia.

== Honours ==
=== Clubs ===
- National championships
  - 2012/2013 Bulgarian Cup, with Marek Union-Ivkoni
  - 2012/2013 Bulgarian Championship, with Marek Union-Ivkoni
  - 2013/2014 Bulgarian Championship, with Marek Union-Ivkoni
  - 2014/2015 Bulgarian Championship, with Marek Union-Ivkoni
  - 2021/2022 Bulgarian SuperCup, with Hebar Pazardzhik
  - 2021/2022 Bulgarian Cup, with Hebar Pazardzhik
  - 2021/2022 Bulgarian Championship, with Hebar Pazardzhik
