= North Macedonia men's national volleyball team =

North Macedonia
- Association: OFM
- Confederation: CEV
- Head coach: Joško Milenkoski
- FIVB ranking: 53 ▲1 (15 October 2026)

Uniforms
Home	Away	Third

European Championship
- Appearances: 3 (First in 2019)
- Best result: 16th (2023)
- https://www.vfmkd.mk/

North Macedonia men's national volleyball team
Medal record

European Volleyball League
Bronze medal – third place	2014 Europe	
Silver medal – second place	2015 Poland	
Silver medal – second place	2016 Macedonia	
Silver medal – second place	2017 Denmark	
Silver medal – second place	2021 Macedonia	
Bronze medal – third place	2022 Hungary	

The North Macedonia men's national volleyball team is the national volleyball team of North Macedonia. They are colloquially known as the Red Lions.

The team has participated in the European Championship since 2019.

== History ==
The Macedonian Volleyball Federation was established in 1946, following the framework of the Macedonian Physical Culture Association. On 13 February 1949, the Macedonian Volleyball Federation became an independent sports organization. The Macedonian team qualified twice for the European Championship, in 2019 and in 2021. The national team also played in the European Championship for a third time in 2023, as they hosted the 2023 Men's European Volleyball Championship in the Boris Trajkovski Sports Center (BTSC) at Skopje, the national team's home ground.

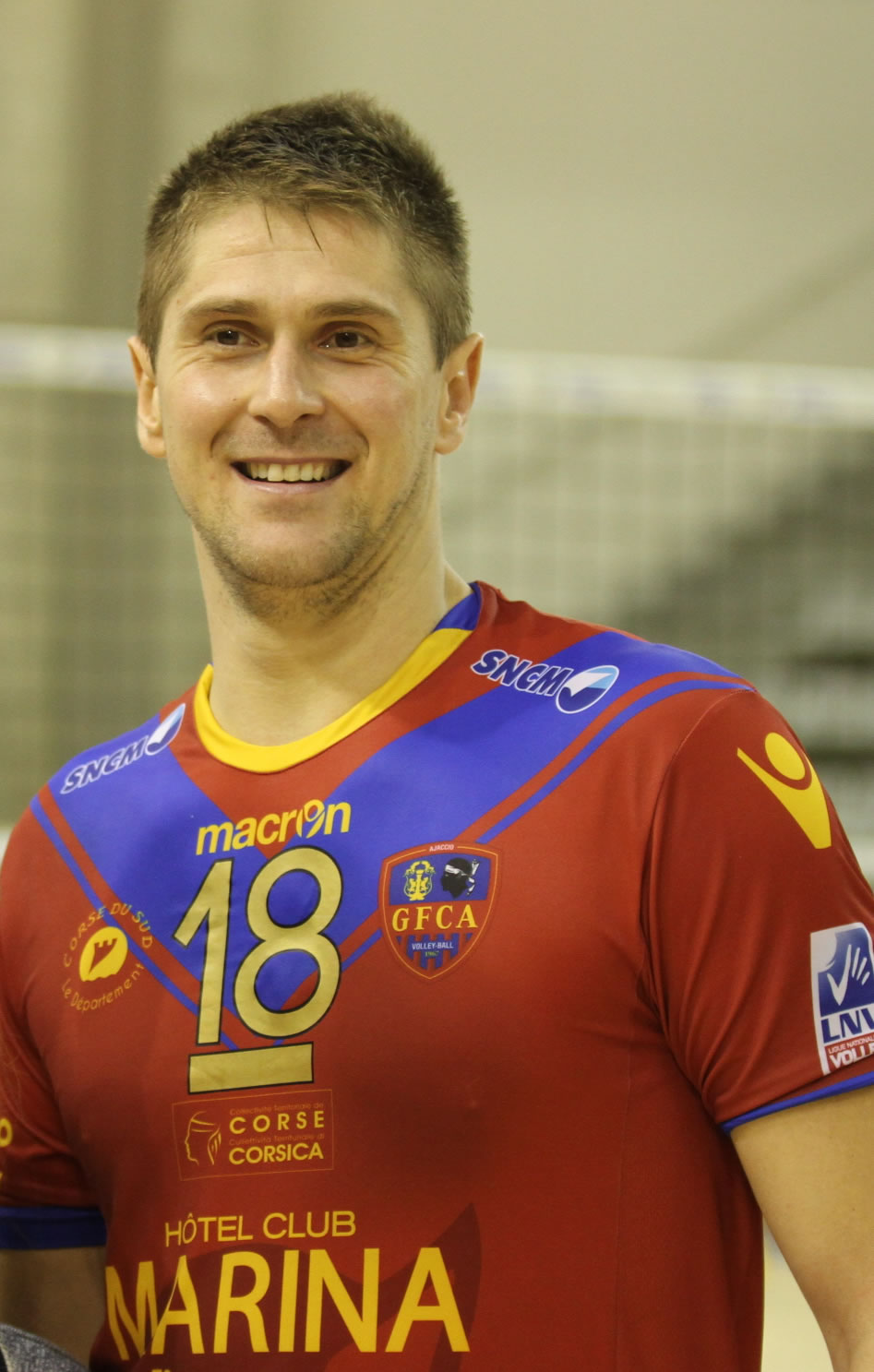
Team Macedonia Jovan Simovski 2004–2021

- CEV Eurovolley 2019: The Macedonian national team performed favorably at the European Championship in 2019. In Ljubljana Stozice Area, the home ground of the Group C team, they beat the Belarusian national team with a score of 3–1 (23–25), (25–19), (29–27), (25–20). They won against the hosts of the Group C team, Slovenia, by a score of 3–1 (26–24), (30–28), (19–25), (26–24). The Macedonian team finished 17th with a score of 2–3.
- CEV Eurovolley 2021: The national team failed to win any games in this event.
- CEV Eurovolley 2023: The Red Lions were the host of Pool C, and Skopje's Boris Trajkovski Sports Center was the venue. In the opening match, the Macedonian team beat Denmark by a score of 3–1 (22–25), (25–22), (25–19), (25–22). Two days later, the national team won against Montenegro with a score of 3–0 (25–22), (25–18), (25–20). The Red Lions qualified for the top 16, but lost to the Italian men's national volleyball team. In the end, the Red Lions finished 16th.

== Home ground ==
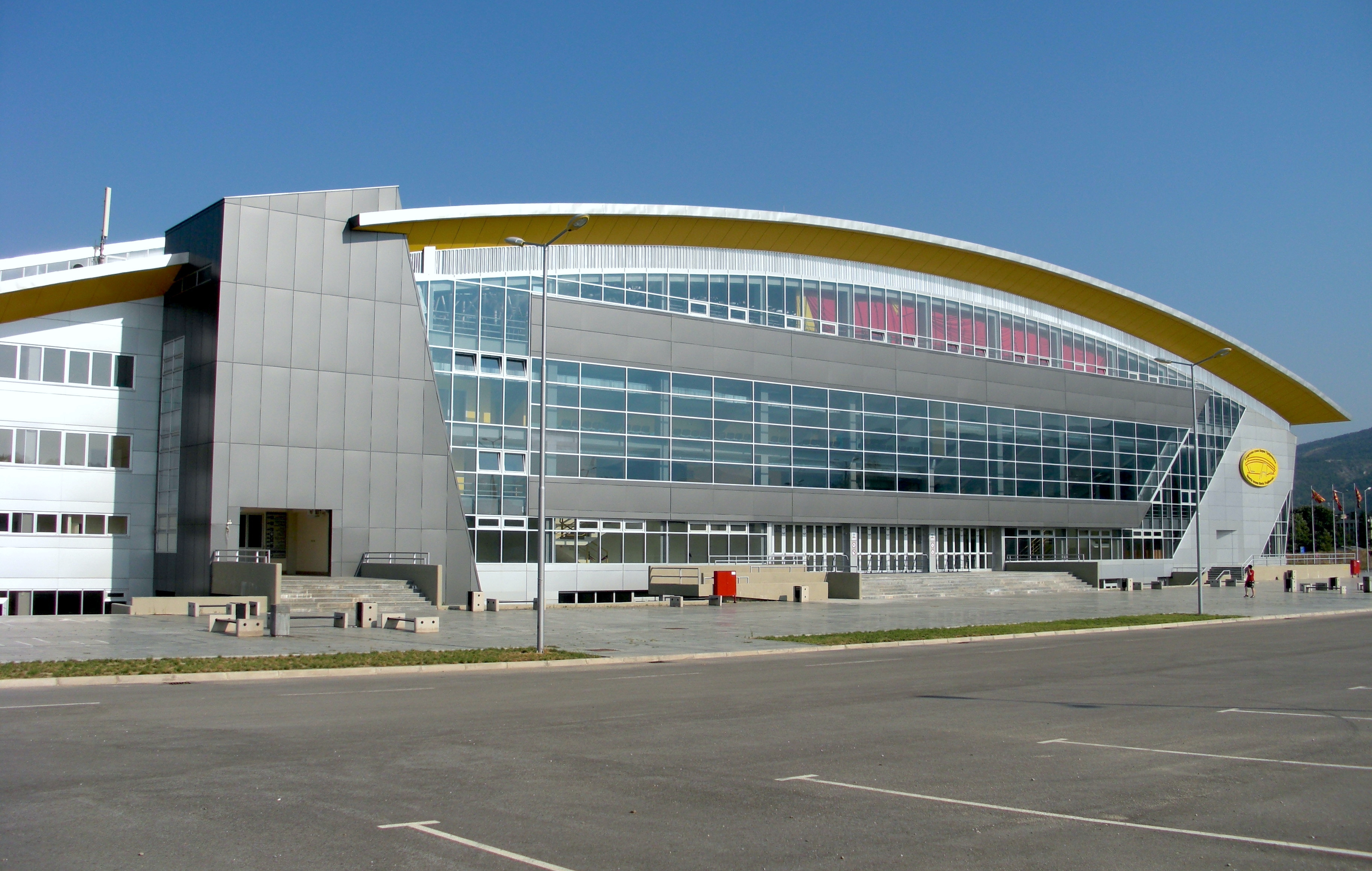
The Boris Trajkovski Sports Center in Skopje

The Boris Trajkovski Sports Center (Macedonian: Спортски центар Борис Трајковски), or BTSC, in Skopje is a multi-functional indoor sports arena. It is located in the Karpoš Municipality of Skopje, Macedonia. It is named after the former president, Boris Trajkovski. The sports center has a capacity of 10,000, and contains an Olympic-size swimming pool and the 5-star hotel Alexander Palace within the complex. The venue also contains four restaurants and a sports bar. Nearby, a water park and ice skating rink are accessible.

The arena is the home ground of the Macedonian volleyball team, both men and women. It was the venue for the European League three times in 2016, 2018 and 2022.

== European League ==
The team has historically focused on competing in the European League, with the goal was of making a team for the European Championship Qualifiers that will be able to qualify for the European Volleyball Championship. This project was started in 2010 by the National Volleyball Federation in order to elevate the smaller sports, such as volleyball, to a higher level.

The national team has participated in eight European League tournaments. The strongest players of the team throughout this period have been the Georgiev brothers, Ljaftov and Madjunkov.

Year	Round	Position	Pld	W	L	SW	SL
(Czech Republic) 2004	did not participate						
–	did not participate						
(Turkey) 2013	did not participate						
(Montenegro) 2014	Semifinals	3rd place, bronze medalist(s)					
(Poland) 2015	Final	2nd place, silver medalist(s)					
(Bulgaria) 2016	Final	2nd place, silver medalist(s)					
(Denmark) 2017	Final	2nd place, silver medalist(s)					
(Czech Republic) 2018	Silver League Semifinals	4th					
(Estonia) 2019	did not enter						
(Belgium) 2021	Silver League Final	2nd place, silver medalist(s)					
(Croatia) 2022	Silver League Semifinals	3rd place, bronze medalist(s)					
(Croatia) 2023	Golden League League Round	11th					
(Croatia) 2024	Golden League League Round	10th					
(Czech Republic) 2025	Golden League League Round	9th					
(Finland) (Netherlands) 2026	League Round	16th					
Total	Participated: 11/11						
Total	Top tier (Golden League): 8/11						

== European Championship ==
- Within Yugoslavia team

1951(5), 1955(5), 1958(7), 1963(7), 1967(7)
1971(11), 1975 (bronze) , 1977(7), 1979 (bronze) , 1981(10)
1985(11), 1987(8), 1989(8), 1991(6)

Year	Position	Pld	W	L
(Belgium) (France) (Netherlands) (Slovenia) 2019	17th place	5	2	3
(Czech Republic) (Estonia) (Finland) (Poland) 2021	23rd place	5	0	5
(Bulgaria) (Israel) (Italy) (North Macedonia) 2023	16th place	6	2	4
(Bulgaria) (Finland) (Italy) (Romania) 2026	20th place	5	1	4
(Montenegro) 2028	TBD			

== World Championship ==
- Within Yugoslavia team

1956(10), 1962(8), 1966(8), 1970(10)

- Macedonia (North Macedonia) 1991–2025 did not qualify

== Olympic Games ==
- Within Yugoslavia team

1980 sixth place

- Macedonia (North Macedonia) 1992–2024 did not qualify

=== Mediterranean Games ===
- Within Yugoslavia team

1963, 1967, 1971, 1975, 1979, 1987 (4), 1991

Year	Position	Pld	W	L
(Turkey) 2013	7th place			
(Spain) 2018	9th place			
(Algeria) 2022	9th place			
(Italy) 2026	Didn't Participate			

== Current team ==
Roster for the 2023 Men's European Volleyball Championship

Head coach:	Joško Milenkoski
Assistant:	Hari Nakovski

No.	Name	Position	Height (cm)	Birth year
1	Darko Angelovski	Libero	180	1994
2	Gjorgi Gjorgiev	Setter	197	1992
3	Toshe Efremov	Outside Spiker	193	2007
4	Nikola Gjorgiev (C)	Opposite	196	1988
5	Vlado Milev	Outside-spiker	195	1987
6	Stojche Arsov	Opposite	196	2003
7	Slave Nakov	Middle-blocker	194	1994
8	Aleksandar Ljaftov	Outside-spiker	198	1990
9	Filip Lepidovski	Middle Blocker	199	2002
10	David Stojanov	Setter	190	2001
11	Filip Despotovski	Setter	194	1986
12	Eftim Richliev	Setter	187	1995
13	Stefan Aleksov	Opposite	195	1996
14	Angel Boshkov	Outside Spiker	193	2002
15	Filip Madjunkov	Middle-blocker	199	1996
16	Stojan Iliev	Outside-spiker	190	1999
17	Luka Kostik	Outside-spiker	198	2001
18	Vase Mihailov	Outside-spiker	199	1986
19	Kostadin Richliev	Libero	184	2000
20	Filip Savovski	Middle Blocker	206	2002
21	Ivan Andonov	Opposite	198	1989
22	Risto Nikolov	Middle Blocker	202	1990
23	Hristijan Andonovski	Middle Blocker	196	2004
24	Filip Nikolovski	Libero	189	1997

== Macedonian players in notable squads ==
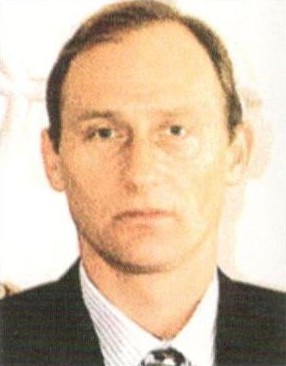
Vladimir Bogoevski

1975 European Championship

- Vladimir Bogoevski

1979 European Championship

- Goran Srbinovski, Aleksandar Tasevski, Vladimir Bogoevski

1980 Olympic Games

- Vladimir Bogoevski, Goran Srbinovski, Aleksandar Tasevski
