= Moustapha M'Baye =

Polish volleyball player (born 1992)

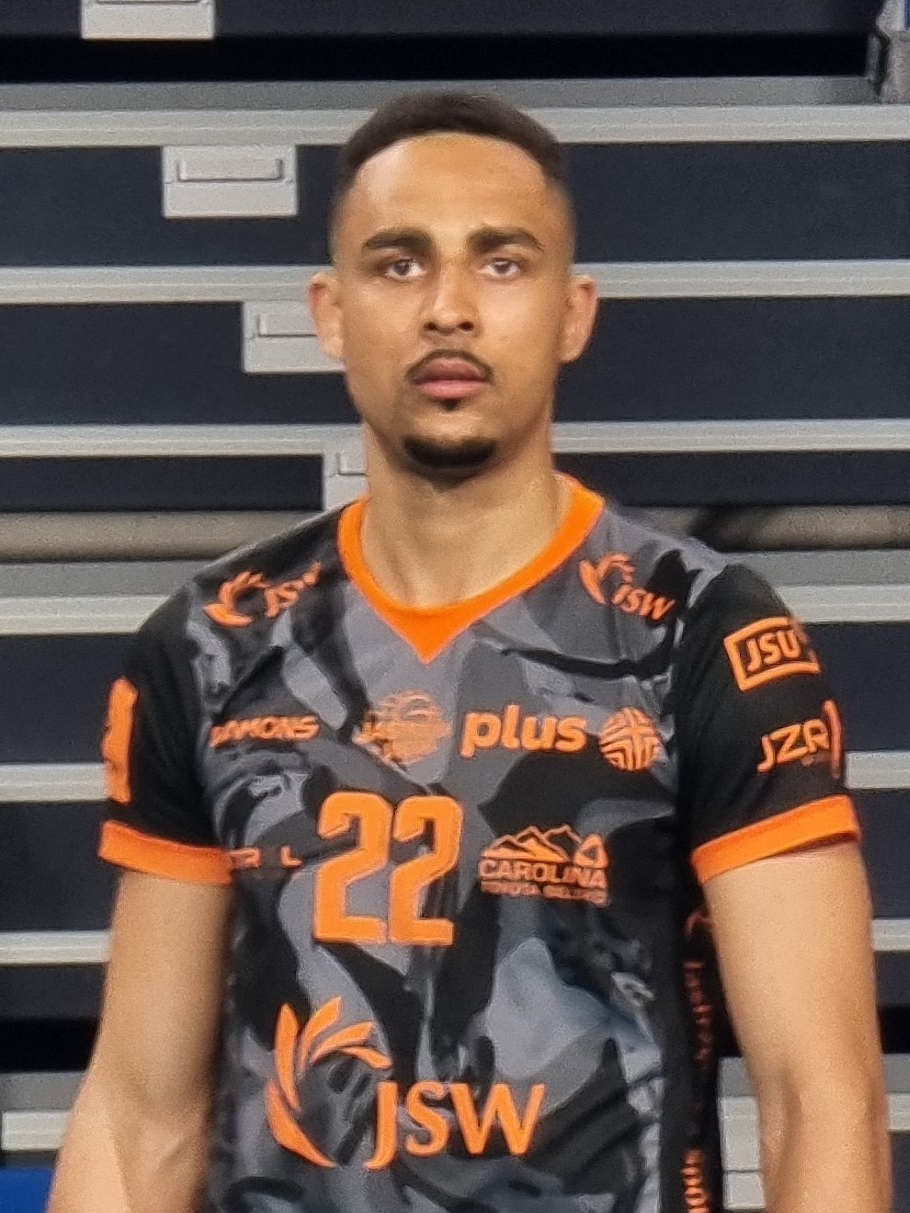
- Moustapha M'Baye in 2024

Personal information
- Born: 22 January 1992 (age 34); Gdańsk, Poland
- Height: 1.98 m (6 ft 6 in)
- Weight: 96 kg (212 lb)
- Spike: 360 cm (142 in)
- Block: 342 cm (135 in)

Volleyball information
- Position: Middle blocker
- Current club: Trefl Gdańsk
- Number: 22

Career
Years	Teams
2011–2015; 2015–2016; 2016–2017; 2017–2018; 2018–2022; 2022–2023; 2023–2024; 2024–	Trefl Gdańsk; Krispol Września; KPS Siedlce; AZS Częstochowa; Stal Nysa; Cuprum Lubin; Jastrzębski Węgiel; Trefl Gdańsk

Moustapha M'Baye (born 22 January 1992) is a Polish professional volleyball player who plays as a middle blocker for Trefl Gdańsk.

== Personal life ==
M'Baye was born in Gdańsk to a Polish mother and Senegalese father.

== Honours ==
=== Club ===
- CEV Champions League
  - 2022–23 – with Jastrzębski Węgiel
  - 2023–24 – with Jastrzębski Węgiel
- Domestic
  - 2014–15 Polish Cup, with Lotos Trefl Gdańsk
  - 2022–23 Polish Championship, with Jastrzębski Węgiel
  - 2023–24 Polish Championship, with Jastrzębski Węgiel
