= 2015 Men's European Volleyball League =

2015 Men's European League
Tournament details
- Host country: Poland
- Dates: 3 July – 9 August (qualification); 13–14 August (final round)
- Teams: 12
- Venue: 1 (in 1 host city)

Final positions
- Champions: Slovenia (1st title)
- Runners-up: Macedonia
- Third place: Poland
- Fourth place: Estonia

Tournament awards
- MVP: (Slovenia) Dejan Vinčič
- Best Setter: (Slovenia) Dejan Vinčič
- Best OH: (North Macedonia) Nikola Gjorgiev (Slovenia) Klemen Čebulj
- Best MB: (Poland) Jan Nowakowski (Estonia) Ardo Kreek
- Best OPP: (North Macedonia) Jovica Simovski
- Best Libero: (Poland) Damian Wojtaszek

The 2015 Men's European Volleyball League was the 12th edition of the annual Men's European Volleyball League, which features men's national volleyball teams from twelve European countries.

A preliminary league round was played from July 3 to August 9, and the final four tournament, which was held at Wałbrzych, Poland.

Slovenia defeated Macedonia 3–0 in the final.

== Teams ==
- Austria
- Belarus
- Croatia
- Denmark
- Estonia
- Greece
- Israel
- Macedonia
- Poland
- Romania
- Slovenia
- Turkey

== League round ==
- All times are local.

=== Pool A ===
Pos	Team	Pld	W	L	Pts	SW	SL	SR	SPW	SPL	SPR
1	Estonia (Q)	10	10	0	29	30	7	4.286	914	784	1.166
2	Macedonia (Q)	10	7	3	21	24	13	1.846	858	802	1.070
3	Poland (Q)	10	6	4	16	22	18	1.222	901	861	1.046
4	Denmark	10	4	6	9	14	24	0.583	802	891	0.900
5	Austria	10	2	8	11	17	25	0.680	900	937	0.961
6	Israel	10	1	9	4	7	27	0.259	717	817	0.878

(Q) Qualified for the phase indicated

==== Leg 1 ====
Date	Time		Score		Set 1	Set 2	Set 3	Set 4	Set 5	Total	Report
3 Jul	20:25	Austria	3–0	Israel	25–18	25–22	25–19			75–59	Report
4 Jul	16:00	Denmark	0–3	Poland	22–25	21–25	14–25			57–75	Report
4 Jul	19:00	Austria	3–1	Israel	25–22	25–18	24–26	25–20		99–86	Report
5 Jul	16:00	Denmark	0–3	Poland	15–25	19–25	16–25			50–75	Report

==== Leg 2 ====
Date	Time		Score		Set 1	Set 2	Set 3	Set 4	Set 5	Total	Report
10 Jul	17:00	Israel	0–3	Denmark	19–25	21–25	23–25			63–75	Report
10 Jul	20:00	Poland	3–2	Austria	25–20	25–15	27–29	23–25	15–11	115–100	Report
10 Jul	21:00	Estonia	3–0	Macedonia	25–9	25–19	25–18			75–46	Report
11 Jul	19:30	Israel	3–0	Denmark	25–20	25–16	25–20			75–56	Report
11 Jul	20:00	Poland	3–2	Austria	25–22	15–25	26–28	25–18	15–12	106–105	Report
11 Jul	20:00	Estonia	3–1	Macedonia	25–21	25–21	27–29	25–21		102–92	Report

==== Leg 3 ====
Date	Time		Score		Set 1	Set 2	Set 3	Set 4	Set 5	Total	Report
17 Jul	20:00	Estonia	3–0	Poland	25–17	25–19	25–18			75–54	Report
18 Jul	20:00	Estonia	3–1	Poland	25–22	18–25	34–32	25–17		102–96	Report
18 Jul	20:15	Macedonia	3–0	Israel	25–13	25–18	25–19			75–50	Report
19 Jul	17:30	Macedonia	3–0	Israel	29–27	25–20	25–19			79–66	Report

==== Leg 4 ====
Date	Time		Score		Set 1	Set 2	Set 3	Set 4	Set 5	Total	Report
25 Jul	20:15	Macedonia	2–3	Denmark	27–29	25–18	25–18	22–25	16–18	115–108	Report
25 Jul	20:25	Austria	1–3	Estonia	25–23	21–25	18–25	23–25		87–98	Report
26 Jul	17:00	Austria	2–3	Estonia	23–25	25–22	25–17	22–25	11–15	106–104	Report
26 Jul	17:30	Macedonia	3–1	Denmark	25–16	22–25	25–18	26–24		98–83	Report

==== Leg 5 ====
Date	Time		Score		Set 1	Set 2	Set 3	Set 4	Set 5	Total	Report
31 Jul	17:00	Israel	2–3	Poland	24–26	25–21	25–19	19–25	9–15	102–106	Report
31 Jul	20:00	Estonia	3–0	Denmark	25–17	25–16	25–23			75–56	Report
1 Aug	19:30	Israel	0–3	Poland	20–25	26–28	22–25			68–78	Report
1 Aug	20:00	Estonia	3–1	Denmark	25–21	30–28	29–31	25–19		109–99	Report
1 Aug	20:15	Macedonia	3–0	Austria	25–18	25–17	26–24			76–59	Report
2 Aug	17:30	Macedonia	3–0	Austria	25–22	25–19	25–22			75–63	Report

==== Leg 6 ====
Date	Time		Score		Set 1	Set 2	Set 3	Set 4	Set 5	Total	Report
7 Aug	20:00	Estonia	3–0	Israel	25–21	25–17	25–21			75–59	Report
7 Aug	17:00	Poland	2–3	Macedonia	24–26	25–22	26–24	20–25	12–15	107–112	Report
8 Aug	16:00	Denmark	3–2	Austria	23–25	22–25	25–19	25–23	16–14	111–106	Report
8 Aug	20:00	Estonia	3–1	Israel	21–25	28–26	25–16	25–22		99–89	Report
8 Aug	17:00	Poland	1–3	Macedonia	25–15	23–25	19–25	22–25		89–90	Report
9 Aug	16:00	Denmark	3–2	Austria	25–17	23–25	19–25	25–21	15–12	107–100	Report

=== Pool B ===
Pos	Team	Pld	W	L	Pts	SW	SL	SR	SPW	SPL	SPR
1	Slovenia (Q)	10	10	0	29	30	5	6.000	855	711	1.203
2	Greece	10	7	3	20	23	15	1.533	890	816	1.091
3	Turkey	10	5	5	13	19	20	0.950	878	889	0.988
4	Belarus	10	3	7	11	15	23	0.652	814	866	0.940
5	Croatia	10	3	7	10	15	24	0.625	836	880	0.950
6	Romania	10	2	8	7	10	25	0.400	742	853	0.870

(Q) Qualified for the phase indicated

==== Leg 1 ====
Date	Time		Score		Set 1	Set 2	Set 3	Set 4	Set 5	Total	Report
10 Jul	20:00	Greece	3–0	Romania	25–22	25–20	25–21			75–63	Report
11 Jul	17:00	Turkey	0–3	Slovenia	21–25	21–25	19–25			61–75	Report
11 Jul	20:00	Greece	3–1	Romania	25–17	20–25	25–12	25–18		95–72	Report
11 Jul	20:30	Croatia	3–1	Belarus	25–23	19–25	25–18	25–19		94–85	Report
12 Jul	17:00	Turkey	1–3	Slovenia	26–24	24–26	15–25	23–25		88–100	Report
12 Jul	20:30	Croatia	1–3	Belarus	25–20	16–25	23–25	19–25		83–95	Report

==== Leg 2 ====
Date	Time		Score		Set 1	Set 2	Set 3	Set 4	Set 5	Total	Report
17 Jul	18:00	Romania	3–0	Belarus	25–22	25–20	25–21			75–63	Report
17 Jul	20:00	Greece	3–1	Turkey	25–23	26–24	23–25	25–22		99–94	Report
18 Jul	18:00	Romania	3–1	Belarus	23–25	25–23	32–30	25–23		105–101	Report
18 Jul	20:00	Greece	3–1	Turkey	25–14	20–25	32–30	25–17		102–86	Report
18 Jul	20:00	Slovenia	3–0	Croatia	25–22	25–19	25–21			75–62	Report
19 Jul	19:00	Slovenia	3–0	Croatia	25–22	25–23	26–24			76–69	Report

==== Leg 3 ====
Date	Time		Score		Set 1	Set 2	Set 3	Set 4	Set 5	Total	Report
24 Jul	19:00	Turkey	3–1	Romania	31–29	25–21	20–25	25–21		101–96	Report
25 Jul	17:00	Belarus	0–3	Slovenia	21–25	22–25	15–25			58–75	Report
25 Jul	19:00	Turkey	3–0	Romania	25–11	26–24	25–22			76–57	Report
25 Jul	20:30	Croatia	2–3	Greece	25–21	22–25	25–23	15–25	12–15	99–109	Report
26 Jul	17:00	Belarus	2–3	Slovenia	25–22	9–25	14–25	25–22	9–15	82–109	Report
26 Jul	20:30	Croatia	1–3	Greece	25–23	17–25	18–25	17–25		77–98	Report

==== Leg 4 ====
Date	Time		Score		Set 1	Set 2	Set 3	Set 4	Set 5	Total	Report
30 Jul	20:30	Greece	3–0	Belarus	25–21	25–15	25–21			75–57	Report
31 Jul	17:00	Turkey	3–2	Croatia	23–25	27–25	18–25	25–23	15–10	108–108	Report
31 Jul	18:00	Romania	0–3	Slovenia	14–25	22–25	17–25			53–75	Report
31 Jul	20:30	Greece	0–3	Belarus	23–25	21–25	16–25			60–75	Report
1 Aug	17:00	Romania	0–3	Slovenia	21–25	15–25	25–27			61–77	Report
1 Aug	20:30	Turkey	3–0	Croatia	25–22	25–15	25–22			75–59	Report

==== Leg 5 ====
Date	Time		Score		Set 1	Set 2	Set 3	Set 4	Set 5	Total	Report
8 Aug	20:30	Belarus	2–3	Turkey	25–20	23–25	25–14	13–25	9–15	95–99	Report
8 Aug	20:00	Slovenia	3–1	Greece	25–13	26–24	18–25	25–23		94–85	Report
8 Aug	20:30	Croatia	3–2	Romania	25–18	25–20	20–25	21–25	19–17	110–105	Report
9 Aug	19:00	Slovenia	3–1	Greece	25–23	25–20	23–25	26–24		99–92	Report
9 Aug	20:30	Belarus	3–1	Turkey	25–23	23–25	25–19	26–24		99–91	Report
9 Aug	20:30	Croatia	3–0	Romania	25–23	25–17	25–14			75–54	Report

== Final four ==
The top placed team from each group and the best second-placed team qualified for the final four. The fourth participant was the organizer of the tournament.

Qualified teams

- Poland (Host)
- Estonia
- Slovenia
- Macedonia

=== Bracket ===
Semi-finals
13 August 17:00 CEST
Poland	0
Slovenia	3
13 August 20:00 CEST
Estonia	0
Macedonia	3

Final
14 August 20:00 CEST
Slovenia	3
Macedonia	0
Third place
14 August 17:00 CEST
Poland	3
Estonia	0

=== Semifinals ===
Date	Time		Score		Set 1	Set 2	Set 3	Set 4	Set 5	Total	Report
13 Aug	17:00	Poland	0–3	Slovenia	15–25	21–25	21–25			57–75	Report
13 Aug	20:00	Estonia	0–3	Macedonia	23–25	22–25	22–25			67–75	Report

=== Third place game ===
Date	Time		Score		Set 1	Set 2	Set 3	Set 4	Set 5	Total	Report
14 Aug	17:00	Poland	3–0	Estonia	25–22	25–23	25–20			75–65	Report

=== Final ===
Date	Time		Score		Set 1	Set 2	Set 3	Set 4	Set 5	Total	Report
14 Aug	20:00	Slovenia	3–0	Macedonia	25–21	25–20	25–17			75–58	Report

== Final standings ==
Rank	Team
1st place, gold medalist(s)	Slovenia
2nd place, silver medalist(s)	Macedonia
3rd place, bronze medalist(s)	Poland
4	Estonia
5	Greece
6	Turkey
7	Denmark
7	Belarus
9	Croatia
9	Austria
11	Romania
11	Israel

Qualified for the 2016 World League

2015 European League champions

Slovenia
1st title

12-man roster
Alen Pajenk, Alen Šket, Mitja Gasparini, Dejan Vinčić, Jan Kozamernik, Jan Klobucar, Jani Kovačič, Jan Pokersnik, Ropret, Tine Urnaut, Klemen Cebulj, Uroš Pavlovič
Head coach
Andrea Giani

== Awards ==
- Most valuable player
  (Slovenia) Dejan Vinčič
- Best setter
  (Slovenia) Dejan Vinčič
- Best outside spikers
  (North Macedonia) Nikola Gjorgiev
  (Slovenia) Klemen Čebulj
- Best middle blockers
  (Poland) Jan Nowakowski
  (Estonia) Ardo Kreek
- Best opposite spiker
  (North Macedonia) Jovica Simovski
- Best libero
  (Poland) Damian Wojtaszek
- Fair play award
  Macedonia
