= Mariusz Sordyl =

Polish volleyball player and coach

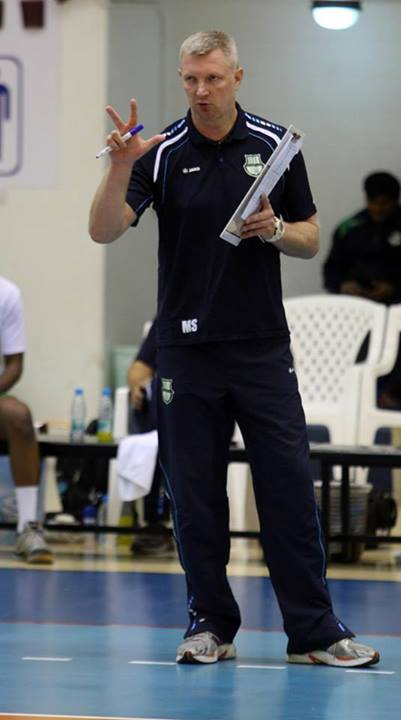

Personal information
- Born: 27 November 1969 (age 56); Wadowice, Poland
- Height: 1.98 m (6 ft 6 in)

Coaching information
- Current team: Trefl Gdańsk
Previous teams coached
Years	Teams
2005–2008; 2008–2010; 2011–2012; 2012; 2013–2017; 2018; 2018–2020; 2021–2023; 2024–	AZS Olsztyn (AC); AZS Olsztyn; Remat Zalău; Romania; Al Ahli Doha; Jeopark Kula Belediyespor; Fenerbahçe; Epicentr-Podolyany; Trefl Gdańsk

Volleyball information
- Position: Outside hitter

Career
Years	Teams
1985–1989; 1989–1990; 1990–1992; 1992–1993; 1993–1994; 1994–1995; 1995–1997; 1997–1998; 1998–2000; 2000–2002; 2002–2004	Beskid Andrychów; Resovia; AZS Olsztyn; ASUL Lyon Volley; Tourcoing LM; Legia Warsaw; Avignon VB; AZS Olsztyn; ASPTT Strasbourg; Stolarka Wołomin; AZS Olsztyn

National team
1989–1995	Poland (145)

Mariusz Sordyl (born 27 November 1969) is a Polish professional volleyball coach and former player, a former member of the Poland national team. He serves as head coach for the Polish PlusLiga team, Trefl Gdańsk.

== Honours ==
=== As a player ===
- Domestic
  - 1990–91 Polish Cup, with AZS Olsztyn
  - 1990–91 Polish Championship, with AZS Olsztyn
  - 1991–92 Polish Cup, with AZS Olsztyn
  - 1991–92 Polish Championship, with AZS Olsztyn
  - 1994–95 Polish Cup, with Legia Warsaw
- Universiade
  - 1991 Summer Universiade
  - 1993 Summer Universiade

=== As a coach ===
- Domestic
  - 2011–12 Romanian Cup, with Remat Zalău
  - 2011–12 Romanian Championship, with Remat Zalău
  - 2018–19 Turkish Cup, with Fenerbahçe
  - 2018–19 Turkish Championship, with Fenerbahçe
  - 2021–22 Ukrainian Championship, with Epicentr-Podolyany
  - 2022–23 Ukrainian Cup, with Epicentr-Podolyany
