= Damian Wojtaszek =

Polish volleyball player (born 1988)

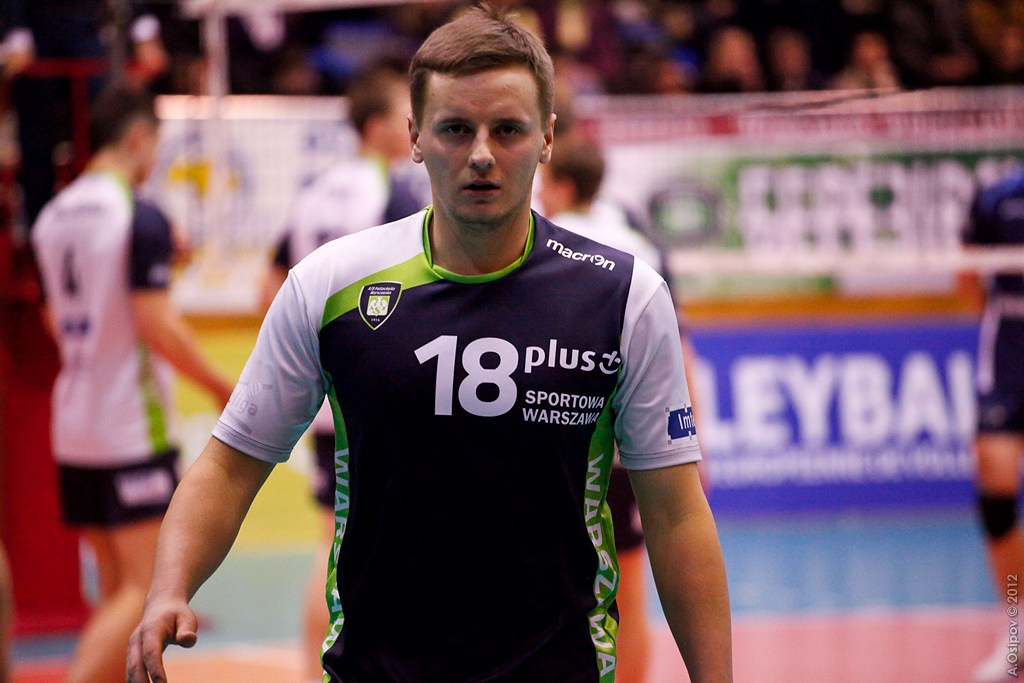

Personal information
- Born: 7 September 1988 (age 38); Milicz, Poland
- Height: 1.80 m (5 ft 11 in)
- Weight: 79 kg (174 lb)

Volleyball information
- Position: Libero
- Current club: Projekt Warsaw
- Number: 18

Career
Years	Teams
2007–2012; 2012–2015; 2015–2017; 2017–	AZS Politechnika Warszawska; Jastrzębski Węgiel; Asseco Resovia; Projekt Warsaw

National team
2013–2021	Poland
Honours
Men's volleyball
Representing Poland
FIVB World Championship
Gold medal – first place	2018 Bulgaria/Italy
FIVB World Cup
Silver medal – second place	2019 Japan
FIVB Nations League
Silver medal – second place	2021 Rimini
CEV European Championship
Bronze medal – third place	2019 Belgium/France/Netherlands/Slovenia
Bronze medal – third place	2021 Poland/Czechia/Estonia/Finland
European League
Bronze medal – third place	2015 Poland

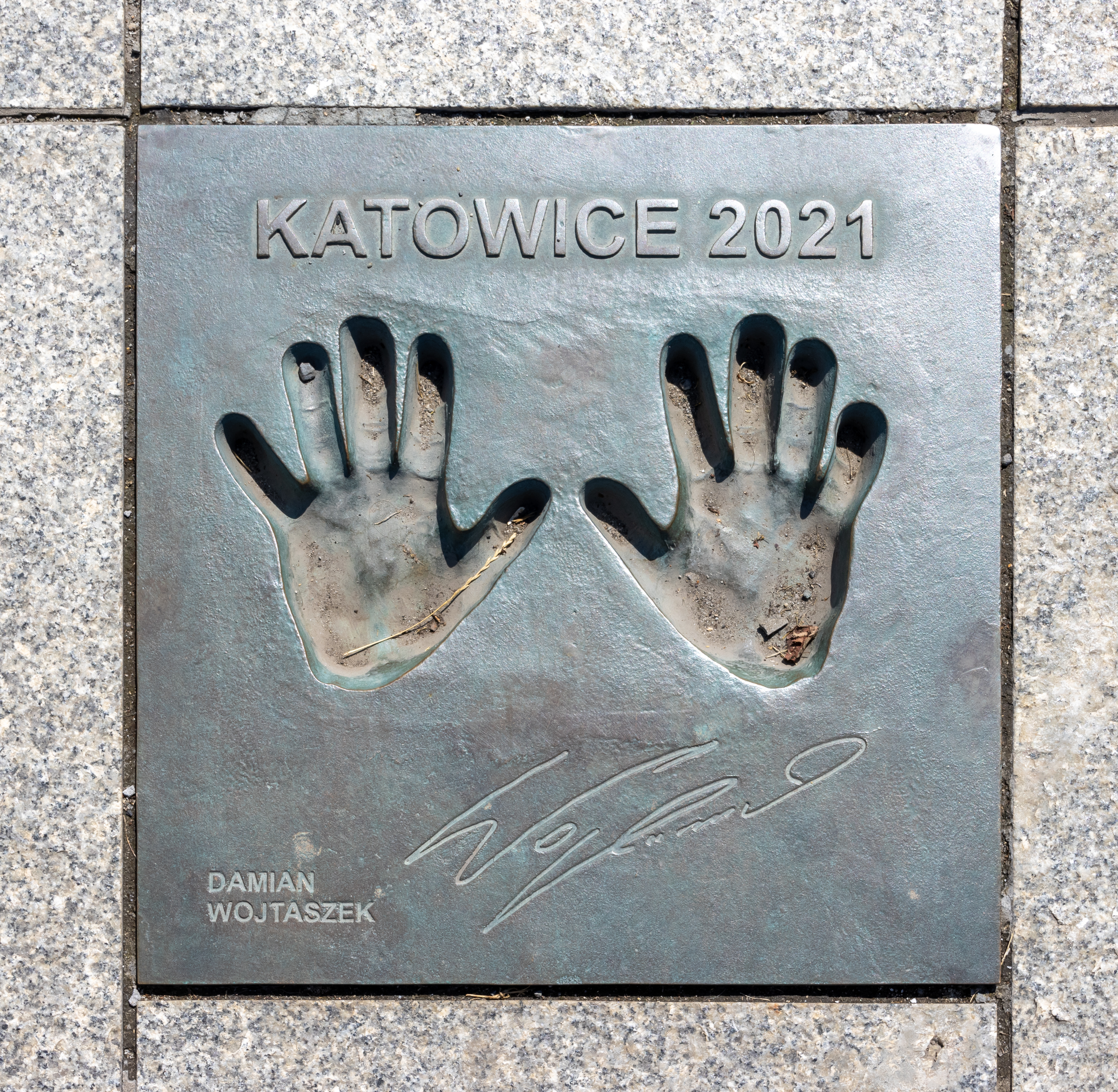
Hand prints and signature at the Avenue of Volleyball Stars, Katowice

Damian Wojtaszek (born 7 September 1988) is a Polish professional volleyball player who plays as a libero for Projekt Warsaw. He is a former member of the Poland national team and the 2018 World Champion.

== Career ==
=== Club ===
In 2012, Wojtaszek joined Jastrzębski Węgiel. In the 2012–13 PlusLiga season, he won a bronze medal of the Polish Championship. In 2014, the club advanced to the Final Four of the Champions League held in Ankara, and after defeating Zenit Kazan won a bronze medal. Jastrzębski Węgiel, including Wojtaszek, ended the season with a second bronze medal of the Polish Championship. After two seasons in Asseco Resovia, he left the club in 2017. On 27 April 2017, Wojtaszek signed a contract with Onico Warsaw.

=== National team ===
On 14 August 2015, he achieved his first medal as a national team player – bronze of the European League. His national team won 3rd place match with Estonia (3–0). He also received individual award for the Best Libero of the tournament.

On 30 September 2018, Poland achieved its third title of the World Champion. Poland beat Brazil in the final and defended the title from 2014.

== Honours ==
=== Club ===
- CEV Challenge Cup
  - 2011–12 – with AZS Politechnika Warszawska
  - 2023–24 – with Projekt Warsaw
- Domestic
  - 2015–16 Polish Championship, with Asseco Resovia
  - 2018–19 Polish Championship, with Onico Warsaw

=== Universiade ===
- 2013 Summer Universiade

=== Individual awards ===
- 2014: Polish Cup – Best defender
- 2014: CEV Champions League – Best libero
- 2015: European League – Best libero

=== State awards ===
- 2018: Gold Cross of Merit
