= Dejan Vinčić =

Slovenian volleyball player (born 1986)

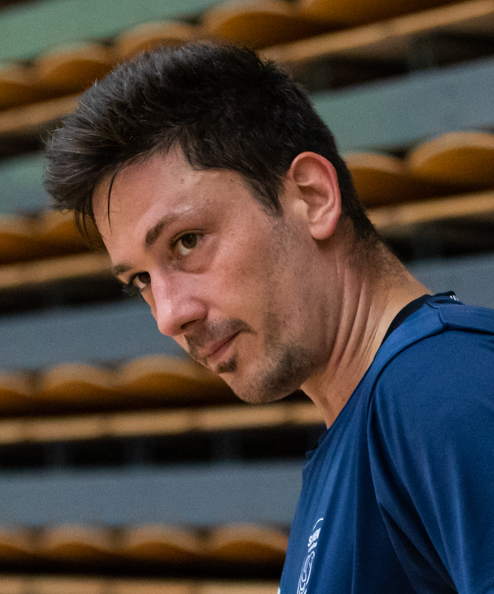
- Vinčić in 2022

Personal information
- Nationality: Slovenian
- Born: 15 September 1986 (age 40); Slovenj Gradec, Yugoslavia
- Height: 2.00 m (6 ft 7 in)
- Weight: 93 kg (205 lb)
- Spike: 344 cm (135 in)
- Block: 328 cm (129 in)

Volleyball information
- Position: Setter
- Current club: Alpacem Kanal

Career
Years	Teams
2004–2006; 2006–2008; 2008–2012; 2012; 2013–2014; 2014–2015; 2015–2016; 2016; 2017; 2017–2020; 2020–2023; 2023–2024; 2024–	Šoštanj Topolšica; Salonit Anhovo; ACH Volley; Skra Bełchatów; Maliye Milli Piyango; Narbonne Volley; Beauvais Oise UC; Yenisei Krasnoyarsk; Halkbank Ankara; Czarni Radom; VfB Friedrichshafen; CS Rapid București; Alpacem Kanal

National team
2005–2025	Slovenia
Medal record
Men's volleyball
Representing Slovenia
FIVB Challenger Cup
Gold medal – first place	2019 Slovenia
CEV European Championship
Silver medal – second place	2015 Bulgaria/Italy
Silver medal – second place	2019 France/Slovenia/Belgium/Netherlands
Silver medal – second place	2021 Poland/Czech Republic/Estonia/Finland
Bronze medal – third place	2023 Italy/Bulgaria/North Macedonia/Israel
European League
Gold medal – first place	2015 Poland
Bronze medal – third place	2011 Slovakia
Mediterranean Games
Bronze medal – third place	2009 Pescara	Team

Dejan Vinčić OLY (born 15 September 1986) is a Slovenian volleyball player who plays for Alpacem Kanal. With the Slovenia national team, he was the runner-up of the European Volleyball Championship three times, in 2015, 2019 and 2021. He also represented Slovenia at the 2024 Summer Olympics.

== Career ==
In August 2015, Vinčić was included in the Slovenia national team squad for the 2015 European League, where Slovenia won gold. He received two individual awards for the Best Setter and the Most Valuable Player. Vinčić was also part of the Slovenian team that won a silver medal at the 2015 European Championship.

In May 2017, Vinčić signed for Cerrad Czarni Radom.

== Sporting achievements ==
=== Club ===
- 2004–05 Slovenian Championship, with Šoštanj Topolšica
- 2007–08 Slovenian Championship, with Salonit Anhovo
- 2008–09 Slovenian Cup, with ACH Volley
- 2008–09 Slovenian Championship, with ACH Volley
- 2009–10 Slovenian Cup, with ACH Volley
- 2009–10 Slovenian Championship, with ACH Volley
- 2010–11 Slovenian Cup, with ACH Volley
- 2010–11 Slovenian Championship, with ACH Volley
- 2011–12 Slovenian Cup, with ACH Volley
- 2011–12 Slovenian Championship, with ACH Volley
- 2012–13 Polish SuperCup, with PGE Skra Bełchatów
- 2016–17 Turkish Championship, with Halkbank Ankara

=== Individual awards ===
- 2015: European League – Best Setter
- 2015: European League – Most Valuable Player
