= Piotr Orczyk =

Polish volleyball player (born 1993)

Personal information
- Born: 19 March 1993 (age 33); Łódź, Poland
- Height: 1.98 m (6 ft 6 in)
- Weight: 87 kg (192 lb)
- Spike: 355 cm (140 in)

Volleyball information
- Position: Outside hitter
- Current club: Trefl Gdańsk
- Number: 17

Career
Years	Teams
2012–2014; 2014–2015; 2015–2018; 2018–2020; 2020–2022; 2022–	Effector Kielce; Volley Aalst; Knack Roeselare; Skra Bełchatów; Warta Zawiercie; Trefl Gdańsk

Piotr Orczyk (born 19 March 1993) is a Polish professional volleyball player who plays as an outside hitter for Trefl Gdańsk.

== Honours ==
=== Club ===
- Domestic
  - 2014–15 Belgian Cup, with Volley Aalst
  - 2015–16 Belgian Cup, with Knack Roeselare
  - 2015–16 Belgian Championship, with Knack Roeselare
  - 2016–17 Belgian Cup, with Knack Roeselare
  - 2016–17 Belgian Championship, with Knack Roeselare
  - 2017–18 Belgian Cup, with Knack Roeselare
  - 2018–19 Polish SuperCup, with PGE Skra Bełchatów
