= Aleksandar Tasevski =

Yugoslav volleyball player (born 1953)

Personal information
- Nationality: Yugoslav Macedonian
- Born: 14 October 1953 (age 71)

Sport
- Sport: Volleyball

Aleksandar Tasevski (born 14 October 1953) is a Yugoslav volleyball player from Skopje, North Macedonia . He competed in the men's tournament at the 1980 Summer Olympics.
