= Klemen Čebulj =

Slovenian volleyball player (born 1992)

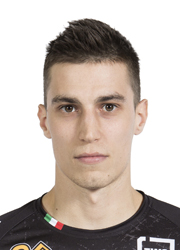

Personal information
- Born: 21 February 1992 (age 34); Slovenj Gradec, Slovenia
- Height: 2.02 m (6 ft 8 in)
- Weight: 94 kg (207 lb)
- Spike: 370 cm (146 in)
- Block: 345 cm (136 in)

Volleyball information
- Position: Outside hitter
- Current club: Asseco Resovia
- Number: 18

Career
Years	Teams
2007–2008; 2008–2011; 2011–2012; 2012–2013; 2013–2015; 2015–2017; 2017–2018; 2018–2019; 2019; 2019–2020; 2020–	OK Fužinar; GOKOP Fram; ACH Volley; Altotevere San Giustino; CMC Ravenna; Volley Lube; Power Volley Milano; Shanghai Golden Age; Power Volley Milano; Itas Trentino; Asseco Resovia

National team
Slovenia
Medal record
Men's volleyball
Representing Slovenia
FIVB Challenger Cup
Gold medal – first place	2019 Slovenia
CEV European Championship
Silver medal – second place	2015 Bulgaria/Italy
Silver medal – second place	2019 France/Slovenia/Belgium/Netherlands
Silver medal – second place	2021 Poland/Czech Republic/Estonia/Finland
Bronze medal – third place	2023 Italy/Bulgaria/North Macedonia/Israel
European League
Gold medal – first place	2015 Poland
Bronze medal – third place	2011 Slovakia
Mediterranean Games
Bronze medal – third place	2009 Pescara

Klemen Čebulj (born 21 February 1992) is a Slovenian volleyball player who plays for Asseco Resovia and the Slovenia national team. With Slovenia, he was the runner-up of the European Volleyball Championship three times, in 2015, 2019 and 2021.

== Career ==
=== National team ===
In August 2015, Čebulj won the gold medal with Slovenia in the 2015 European League. He was also the runner-up of the 2015 European Championship, where Slovenia lost 3–0 against France in the final.

He represented Slovenia at the 2024 Summer Olympics.
