= 2022–23 PlusLiga =

Polish volleyball league

- League: PlusLiga
- Sport: Volleyball
- Duration: 30 Sept. 2022 – 16 May 2023
- Number of games: 279
- Number of teams: 16
- TV partner(s): Polsat Sport
- League champions: Jastrzębski Węgiel (3rd title)

Seasons
- ← 2021–22 2023–24 →

The 2022–23 PlusLiga was the 87th season of the Polish Volleyball Championship, the 70th season of the highest tier domestic division in the Polish volleyball league system since its establishment in 1954, and the 23rd season as a professional league. The league is operated by the Polish Volleyball League SA (Polish: Polska Liga Siatkówki SA).

This season composed 16 teams, including the Ukrainian team of Barkom-Kazhany Lviv. The regular season was played as a round-robin tournament. Each team played a total of 30 matches, half at home and half away. The season started on 30 September 2022 and concluded on 16 May 2023.

Jastrzębski Węgiel won their 3rd title of the Polish Champions.

== Regular season ==
Ranking system:

1. Points
2. Number of victories
3. Set ratio
4. Setpoint ratio
5. H2H results

Result	Winners	Losers
3–0	3 points	0 points
3–1	3 points	0 points
3–2	2 points	1 point

Pos	Team	Pld	W	L	Pts	SW	SL	SR	SPW	SPL	SPR	Qualification or relegation
1	Asseco Resovia	30	24	6	72	78	30	2.600	2596	2292	1.133	Quarterfinals
2	Aluron CMC Warta Zawiercie	30	24	6	68	77	37	2.081	2659	2390	1.113	Quarterfinals
3	Jastrzębski Węgiel	30	21	9	67	77	34	2.265	2646	2347	1.127	Quarterfinals
4	ZAKSA Kędzierzyn-Koźle	30	22	8	64	73	41	1.780	2664	2462	1.082	Quarterfinals
5	Projekt Warsaw	30	21	9	60	70	42	1.667	2568	2397	1.071	Quarterfinals
6	Trefl Gdańsk	30	20	10	57	66	44	1.500	2557	2422	1.056	Quarterfinals
7	Indykpol AZS Olsztyn	30	19	11	54	65	48	1.354	2631	2544	1.034	Quarterfinals
8	PSG Stal Nysa	30	14	16	44	54	54	1.000	2362	2403	0.983	Quarterfinals
9	LUK Lublin	30	15	15	43	56	62	0.903	2604	2641	0.986	
10	Ślepsk Malow Suwałki	30	13	17	41	54	59	0.915	2509	2585	0.971	
11	PGE Skra Bełchatów	30	11	19	39	55	67	0.821	2657	2674	0.994	
12	GKS Katowice	30	12	18	32	41	66	0.621	2374	2470	0.961	
13	Barkom-Kazhany Lviv	30	8	22	30	42	70	0.600	2344	2598	0.902	
14	Cuprum Lubin	30	10	20	27	42	75	0.560	2512	2711	0.927	
15	Cerrad Enea Czarni Radom	30	3	27	14	27	83	0.325	2297	2627	0.874	
16	BBTS Bielsko-Biała	30	3	27	8	22	87	0.253	2188	2605	0.840	Relegation

Source: PlusLiga

=== 1st round ===
Date	Time		Score		Set 1	Set 2	Set 3	Set 4	Set 5	Total	Report
30 Sep	17:30	Jastrzębski Węgiel	3–0	GKS Katowice	25–23	25–20	28–26			78–69	
1 Oct	14:45	Indykpol AZS Olsztyn	1–3	ZAKSA Kędzierzyn-Koźle	21–25	25–22	16–25	16–25		78–97	
1 Oct	17:30	Asseco Resovia	3–0	Projekt Warsaw	25–12	25–21	25–20			75–53	
1 Oct	20:30	LUK Lublin	2–3	Cerrad Enea Czarni Radom	18–25	22–25	25–12	25–23	18–20	108–105	
2 Oct	14:45	Aluron CMC Warta Zawiercie	3–2	PGE Skra Bełchatów	25–21	16–25	18–25	25–18	15–13	99–102	
2 Oct	17:30	Trefl Gdańsk	3–0	Barkom-Kazhany Lviv	25–18	25–21	25–17			75–56	
2 Oct	20:30	PSG Stal Nysa	3–1	Ślepsk Malow Suwałki	29–27	22–25	25–21	25–19		101–92	
3 Oct	17:30	BBTS Bielsko-Biała	1–3	Cuprum Lubin	23–25	23–25	31–29	22–25		99–104	

=== 2nd round ===
Date	Time		Score		Set 1	Set 2	Set 3	Set 4	Set 5	Total	Report
4 Oct	16:30	GKS Katowice	3–1	Projekt Warsaw	25–22	20–25	25–16	25–19		95–82	
4 Oct	18:45	Jastrzębski Węgiel	3–1	Indykpol AZS Olsztyn	21–25	32–30	25–20	25–18		103–93	
4 Oct	21:00	ZAKSA Kędzierzyn-Koźle	3–0	LUK Lublin	25–18	25–23	25–18			75–59	
5 Oct	16:30	Cerrad Enea Czarni Radom	0–3	Aluron CMC Warta Zawiercie	22–25	18–25	16–25			56–75	
5 Oct	18:45	Barkom-Kazhany Lviv	0–3	Asseco Resovia	23–25	22–25	13–25			58–75	
5 Oct	21:00	PGE Skra Bełchatów	3–0	BBTS Bielsko-Biała	25–22	25–17	25–19			75–58	
6 Oct	18:45	Cuprum Lubin	0–3	PSG Stal Nysa	12–25	20–25	17–25			49–75	
6 Oct	21:00	Ślepsk Malow Suwałki	3–1	Trefl Gdańsk	26–24	18–25	29–27	27–25		100–101	

=== 3rd round ===
Date	Time		Score		Set 1	Set 2	Set 3	Set 4	Set 5	Total	Report
7 Oct	20:30	LUK Lublin	1–3	Jastrzębski Węgiel	21–25	22–25	26–24	15–25		84–99	
8 Oct	14:45	Projekt Warsaw	3–2	Barkom-Kazhany Lviv	17–25	23–25	25–20	25–20	15–3	105–93	
8 Oct	17:30	Indykpol AZS Olsztyn	3–0	GKS Katowice	28–26	25–19	25–21			78–66	
9 Oct	14:45	Aluron CMC Warta Zawiercie	3–1	ZAKSA Kędzierzyn-Koźle	25–18	21–25	25–22	27–25		98–90	
9 Oct	17:30	Asseco Resovia	3–1	Ślepsk Malow Suwałki	27–29	25–20	25–13	25–22		102–84	
9 Oct	20:30	PSG Stal Nysa	2–3	PGE Skra Bełchatów	25–20	25–20	19–25	21–25	8–15	98–105	
10 Oct	17:30	BBTS Bielsko-Biała	3–2	Cerrad Enea Czarni Radom	25–18	22–25	20–25	25–23	15–12	107–103	
11 Oct	17:30	Trefl Gdańsk	3–0	Cuprum Lubin	25–16	25–21	25–19			75–56	

=== 4th round ===
Date	Time		Score		Set 1	Set 2	Set 3	Set 4	Set 5	Total	Report
13 Oct	17:30	ZAKSA Kędzierzyn-Koźle	3–0	BBTS Bielsko-Biała	25–18	25–23	25–20			75–61	
14 Oct	17:30	Indykpol AZS Olsztyn	3–1	LUK Lublin	25–22	20–25	25–17	25–15		95–79	
14 Oct	20:30	Cerrad Enea Czarni Radom	1–3	PSG Stal Nysa	22–25	21–25	25–19	25–27		93–96	
15 Oct	14:45	PGE Skra Bełchatów	3–1	Trefl Gdańsk	23–25	25–22	25–21	25–18		98–86	
15 Oct	17:30	Ślepsk Malow Suwałki	3–1	Projekt Warsaw	25–22	27–29	25–20	31–29		108–100	
15 Oct	20:30	Cuprum Lubin	0–3	Asseco Resovia	27–29	21–25	18–25			66–79	
16 Oct	14:45	Jastrzębski Węgiel	3–0	Aluron CMC Warta Zawiercie	25–20	25–18	25–22			75–60	
16 Oct	17:30	GKS Katowice	3–2	Barkom-Kazhany Lviv	25–23	25–20	22–25	21–25	15–12	108–105	

=== 5th round ===
Date	Time		Score		Set 1	Set 2	Set 3	Set 4	Set 5	Total	Report
21 Oct	17:30	BBTS Bielsko-Biała	0–3	Jastrzębski Węgiel	19–25	19–25	19–25			57–75	
21 Oct	20:30	PSG Stal Nysa	3–0	ZAKSA Kędzierzyn-Koźle	25–21	25–22	25–20			75–63	
22 Oct	14:45	PGE Skra Bełchatów	2–3	Asseco Resovia	18–25	25–13	25–22	22–25	8–15	98–100	
22 Oct	17:30	Aluron CMC Warta Zawiercie	2–3	Indykpol AZS Olsztyn	25–20	24–26	23–25	25–20	12–15	109–106	
22 Oct	20:30	LUK Lublin	2–3	GKS Katowice	25–20	27–25	16–25	21–25	12–15	101–110	
23 Oct	14:45	Barkom-Kazhany Lviv	1–3	Ślepsk Malow Suwałki	25–20	22–25	18–25	16–25		81–95	
23 Oct	17:30	Projekt Warsaw	3–1	Cuprum Lubin	25–18	23–25	25–22	25–19		98–84	
24 Oct	17:30	Trefl Gdańsk	3–0	Cerrad Enea Czarni Radom	25–21	25–21	25–20			75–62	

=== 6th round ===
Date	Time		Score		Set 1	Set 2	Set 3	Set 4	Set 5	Total	Report
28 Oct	17:30	GKS Katowice	3–2	Ślepsk Malow Suwałki	23–25	25–16	20–25	25–21	15–10	108–97	
28 Oct	20:30	Cuprum Lubin	3–2	Barkom-Kazhany Lviv	22–25	18–25	25–12	25–17	15–10	105–89	
29 Oct	14:45	PGE Skra Bełchatów	0–3	Projekt Warsaw	17–25	23–25	11–25			51–75	
29 Oct	17:30	Indykpol AZS Olsztyn	3–0	BBTS Bielsko-Biała	25–17	25–15	25–18			75–50	
29 Oct	20:30	Cerrad Enea Czarni Radom	0–3	Asseco Resovia	21–25	20–25	16–25			57–75	
30 Oct	14:45	ZAKSA Kędzierzyn-Koźle	3–0	Trefl Gdańsk	25–19	25–18	25–20			75–57	
30 Oct	17:30	PSG Stal Nysa	0–3	Jastrzębski Węgiel	22–25	18–25	13–25			53–75	
30 Oct	20:30	LUK Lublin	2–3	Aluron CMC Warta Zawiercie	25–21	25–15	20–25	21–25	11–15	102–101	

=== 7th round ===
Date	Time		Score		Set 1	Set 2	Set 3	Set 4	Set 5	Total	Report
1 Nov	16:30	Ślepsk Malow Suwałki	3–1	Cuprum Lubin	25–19	15–25	25–20	25–22		90–86	
1 Nov	18:45	Barkom-Kazhany Lviv	3–2	PGE Skra Bełchatów	22–25	25–23	25–23	16–25	15–13	103–109	
1 Nov	21:00	Projekt Warsaw	3–0	Cerrad Enea Czarni Radom	25–21	25–20	27–25			77–66	
2 Nov	16:30	PSG Stal Nysa	3–0	Indykpol AZS Olsztyn	25–20	25–19	25–20			75–59	
2 Nov	18:45	Trefl Gdańsk	0–3	Jastrzębski Węgiel	23–25	17–25	14–25			54–75	
2 Nov	21:00	Asseco Resovia	3–0	ZAKSA Kędzierzyn-Koźle	29–27	25–19	26–24			80–70	
3 Nov	16:30	Aluron CMC Warta Zawiercie	3–0	GKS Katowice	29–27	25–20	25–19			79–66	
3 Nov	18:45	BBTS Bielsko-Biała	1–3	LUK Lublin	20–25	23–25	26–24	21–25		90–99	

=== 8th round ===
Date	Time		Score		Set 1	Set 2	Set 3	Set 4	Set 5	Total	Report
4 Nov	20:30	PGE Skra Bełchatów	0–3	Ślepsk Malow Suwałki	20–25	23–25	21–25			64–75	
5 Nov	14:45	Jastrzębski Węgiel	3–0	Asseco Resovia	26–24	25–23	26–24			77–71	
5 Nov	20:30	Cerrad Enea Czarni Radom	0–3	Barkom-Kazhany Lviv	20–25	15–25	22–25			57–75	
6 Nov	14:45	ZAKSA Kędzierzyn-Koźle	3–1	Projekt Warsaw	25–22	25–23	21–25	25–23		96–93	
6 Nov	17:30	LUK Lublin	3–1	PSG Stal Nysa	29–27	25–20	19–25	25–22		98–94	
6 Nov	20:30	Aluron CMC Warta Zawiercie	3–0	BBTS Bielsko-Biała	25–18	25–21	25–23			75–62	
7 Nov	17:30	Indykpol AZS Olsztyn	0–3	Trefl Gdańsk	15–25	25–27	15–25			55–77	
7 Nov	20:30	GKS Katowice	3–0	Cuprum Lubin	25–19	25–17	25–16			75–52	

=== 9th round ===
Date	Time		Score		Set 1	Set 2	Set 3	Set 4	Set 5	Total	Report
10 Nov	20:30	Ślepsk Malow Suwałki	3–2	Cerrad Enea Czarni Radom	23–25	31–29	25–20	23–25	19–17	121–116	
11 Nov	17:30	Trefl Gdańsk	3–0	LUK Lublin	25–17	25–19	25–18			75–54	
12 Nov	14:45	Asseco Resovia	3–1	Indykpol AZS Olsztyn	26–24	25–23	23–25	25–20		99–92	
12 Nov	17:30	Projekt Warsaw	1–3	Jastrzębski Węgiel	11–25	25–22	21–25	16–25		73–97	
13 Nov	14:45	Barkom-Kazhany Lviv	2–3	ZAKSA Kędzierzyn-Koźle	28–26	17–25	25–20	21–25	10–15	101–111	
13 Nov	17:30	Cuprum Lubin	3–2	PGE Skra Bełchatów	25–19	24–26	25–22	23–25	15–10	112–102	
13 Nov	20:30	PSG Stal Nysa	0–3	Aluron CMC Warta Zawiercie	14–25	22–25	16–25			52–75	
14 Nov	20:30	BBTS Bielsko-Biała	1–3	GKS Katowice	21–25	25–20	22–25	19–25		87–95	

=== 10th round ===
Date	Time		Score		Set 1	Set 2	Set 3	Set 4	Set 5	Total	Report
18 Nov	17:30	LUK Lublin	0–3	Asseco Resovia	19–25	22–25	16–25			57–75	
18 Nov	20:30	PSG Stal Nysa	3–0	BBTS Bielsko-Biała	25–14	25–18	25–21			75–53	
19 Nov	14:45	Aluron CMC Warta Zawiercie	3–0	Trefl Gdańsk	25–19	25–23	28–26			78–68	
19 Nov	17:30	ZAKSA Kędzierzyn-Koźle	3–0	Ślepsk Malow Suwałki	25–22	26–24	25–21			76–67	
19 Nov	20:30	GKS Katowice	0–3	PGE Skra Bełchatów	21–25	21–25	23–25			65–75	
20 Nov	14:45	Indykpol AZS Olsztyn	0–3	Projekt Warsaw	24–26	19–25	20–25			63–76	
20 Nov	17:30	Cerrad Enea Czarni Radom	0–3	Cuprum Lubin	17–25	20–25	21–25			58–75	
20 Nov	20:30	Jastrzębski Węgiel	3–0	Barkom-Kazhany Lviv	25–14	30–28	25–20			80–62	

=== 11th round ===
Date	Time		Score		Set 1	Set 2	Set 3	Set 4	Set 5	Total	Report
22 Nov	16:15	Trefl Gdańsk	3–0	BBTS Bielsko-Biała	25–17	25–22	25–22			75–61	
22 Nov	18:30	PSG Stal Nysa	2–3	GKS Katowice	21–25	24–26	25–17	25–22	12–15	107–105	
22 Nov	21:00	Asseco Resovia	1–3	Aluron CMC Warta Zawiercie	21–25	32–30	19–25	22–25		94–105	
23 Nov	16:15	PGE Skra Bełchatów	3–0	Cerrad Enea Czarni Radom	25–17	25–14	25–21			75–52	
23 Nov	18:30	Cuprum Lubin	0–3	ZAKSA Kędzierzyn-Koźle	20–25	11–25	18–25			49–75	
23 Nov	21:00	Projekt Warsaw	1–3	LUK Lublin	25–19	27–29	18–25	17–25		87–98	
24 Nov	16:15	Ślepsk Malow Suwałki	0–3	Jastrzębski Węgiel	22–25	17–25	25–27			64–77	
24 Nov	18:30	Barkom-Kazhany Lviv	2–3	Indykpol AZS Olsztyn	22–25	25–23	19–25	28–26	13–15	107–114	

=== 12th round ===
Date	Time		Score		Set 1	Set 2	Set 3	Set 4	Set 5	Total	Report
19 Oct	17:30	GKS Katowice	0–3	Cerrad Enea Czarni Radom	21–25	21–25	28–30			70–80	
25 Nov	20:30	PSG Stal Nysa	1–3	Trefl Gdańsk	20–25	25–22	14–25	22–25		81–97	
26 Nov	14:45	PGE Skra Bełchatów	2–3	ZAKSA Kędzierzyn-Koźle	25–14	23–25	25–21	23–25	9–15	105–100	
26 Nov	17:30	Jastrzębski Węgiel	1–3	Cuprum Lubin	25–22	21–25	21–25	22–25		89–97	
26 Nov	20:30	LUK Lublin	3–2	Barkom-Kazhany Lviv	25–22	24–26	25–19	24–26	15–10	113–103	
27 Nov	14:45	Aluron CMC Warta Zawiercie	3–0	Projekt Warsaw	25–22	25–23	25–19			75–64	
27 Nov	17:30	BBTS Bielsko-Biała	0–3	Asseco Resovia	18–25	20–25	18–25			56–75	
28 Nov	17:30	Indykpol AZS Olsztyn	2–3	Ślepsk Malow Suwałki	21–25	25–21	25–20	23–25	18–20	112–111	

=== 13th round ===
Date	Time		Score		Set 1	Set 2	Set 3	Set 4	Set 5	Total	Report
1 Dec	17:30	Asseco Resovia	3–0	PSG Stal Nysa	25–22	25–18	25–14			75–54	
2 Dec	20:30	Projekt Warsaw	3–0	BBTS Bielsko-Biała	25–20	25–16	25–15			75–51	
3 Dec	14:45	PGE Skra Bełchatów	3–2	Jastrzębski Węgiel	20–25	25–20	17–25	27–25	15–11	104–106	
3 Dec	17:30	Ślepsk Malow Suwałki	2–3	LUK Lublin	25–22	23–25	17–25	25–20	10–15	100–107	
3 Dec	20:30	Indykpol AZS Olsztyn	3–0	Cuprum Lubin	26–24	25–21	25–16			76–61	
4 Dec	14:45	ZAKSA Kędzierzyn-Koźle	3–2	Cerrad Enea Czarni Radom	22–25	25–19	23–25	25–21	15–11	110–101	
4 Dec	17:30	Barkom-Kazhany Lviv	0–3	Aluron CMC Warta Zawiercie	20–25	20–25	23–25			63–75	
5 Dec	17:30	Trefl Gdańsk	3–1	GKS Katowice	21–25	27–25	25–23	25–23		98–96	

=== 14th round ===
Date	Time		Score		Set 1	Set 2	Set 3	Set 4	Set 5	Total	Report
6 Dec	16:15	PSG Stal Nysa	1–3	Projekt Warsaw	25–18	21–25	15–25	20–25		81–93	
6 Dec	18:30	Aluron CMC Warta Zawiercie	3–0	Ślepsk Malow Suwałki	25–13	25–14	25–19			75–46	
6 Dec	21:00	Jastrzębski Węgiel	3–0	Cerrad Enea Czarni Radom	25–23	25–18	25–20			75–61	
7 Dec	16:15	Indykpol AZS Olsztyn	3–1	PGE Skra Bełchatów	22–25	25–15	27–25	27–25		101–90	
7 Dec	18:30	LUK Lublin	3–0	Cuprum Lubin	25–20	25–17	25–23			75–60	
7 Dec	21:00	BBTS Bielsko-Biała	0–3	Barkom-Kazhany Lviv	21–25	31–33	16–25			68–83	
8 Dec	16:15	GKS Katowice	1–3	ZAKSA Kędzierzyn-Koźle	31–29	14–25	21–25	19–25		85–104	
8 Dec	18:30	Trefl Gdańsk	2–3	Asseco Resovia	25–20	23–25	25–23	19–25	13–15	105–108	

=== 15th round ===
Date	Time		Score		Set 1	Set 2	Set 3	Set 4	Set 5	Total	Report
10 Dec	14:45	PGE Skra Bełchatów	3–0	LUK Lublin	25–15	25–22	25–17			75–54	
10 Dec	17:30	Cuprum Lubin	1–3	Aluron CMC Warta Zawiercie	25–27	29–27	18–25	22–25		94–104	
10 Dec	20:30	Cerrad Enea Czarni Radom	0–3	Indykpol AZS Olsztyn	20–25	22–25	18–25			60–75	
11 Dec	14:45	Jastrzębski Węgiel	2–3	ZAKSA Kędzierzyn-Koźle	20–25	25–19	25–21	22–25	11–15	103–105	
11 Dec	17:30	Projekt Warsaw	3–0	Trefl Gdańsk	27–25	25–22	25–20			77–67	
12 Dec	17:30	Asseco Resovia	3–0	GKS Katowice	26–24	25–16	25–23			76–63	
12 Dec	20:30	Ślepsk Malow Suwałki	3–0	BBTS Bielsko-Biała	25–21	25–19	25–15			75–55	
13 Dec	20:30	Barkom-Kazhany Lviv	1–3	PSG Stal Nysa	25–20	16–25	19–25	19–25		79–95	

=== 16th round ===
Date	Time		Score		Set 1	Set 2	Set 3	Set 4	Set 5	Total	Report
15 Dec	17:30	Cuprum Lubin	3–1	BBTS Bielsko-Biała	25–16	25–21	21–25	25–20		96–82	
16 Dec	17:30	Ślepsk Malow Suwałki	0–3	PSG Stal Nysa	18–25	23–25	21–25			62–75	
16 Dec	20:30	Cerrad Enea Czarni Radom	2–3	LUK Lublin	25–23	21–25	18–25	25–22	8–15	97–110	
17 Dec	14:45	PGE Skra Bełchatów	2–3	Aluron CMC Warta Zawiercie	23–25	25–20	23–25	25–20	13–15	109–105	
17 Dec	17:30	ZAKSA Kędzierzyn-Koźle	2–3	Indykpol AZS Olsztyn	25–17	22–25	25–18	25–27	12–15	109–102	
17 Dec	20:30	GKS Katowice	0–3	Jastrzębski Węgiel	21–25	21–25	16–25			58–75	
18 Dec	13:00	Projekt Warsaw	0–3	Asseco Resovia	13–25	16–25	17–25			46–75	
18 Dec	20:30	Barkom-Kazhany Lviv	2–3	Trefl Gdańsk	19–25	23–25	25–22	25–22	10–15	102–109	

=== 17th round ===
Date	Time		Score		Set 1	Set 2	Set 3	Set 4	Set 5	Total	Report
20 Dec	17:30	Aluron CMC Warta Zawiercie	3–0	Cerrad Enea Czarni Radom	25–23	25–17	25–21			75–61	
20 Dec	20:30	LUK Lublin	3–2	ZAKSA Kędzierzyn-Koźle	39–37	18–25	17–25	25–23	15–10	114–120	
21 Dec	16:15	Indykpol AZS Olsztyn	3–1	Jastrzębski Węgiel	25–19	25–18	21–25	29–27		100–89	
21 Dec	18:30	PSG Stal Nysa	3–0	Cuprum Lubin	25–21	25–21	25–21			75–63	
21 Dec	21:00	Projekt Warsaw	3–0	GKS Katowice	25–17	25–21	25–19			75–57	
22 Dec	16:15	BBTS Bielsko-Biała	2–3	PGE Skra Bełchatów	22–25	22–25	27–25	25–22	8–15	104–112	
22 Dec	18:30	Trefl Gdańsk	3–2	Ślepsk Malow Suwałki	18–25	25–17	25–22	23–25	15–13	106–102	
23 Dec	17:30	Asseco Resovia	3–1	Barkom-Kazhany Lviv	25–18	27–25	22–25	25–11		99–79	

=== 18th round ===
Date	Time		Score		Set 1	Set 2	Set 3	Set 4	Set 5	Total	Report
28 Dec	17:30	Cerrad Enea Czarni Radom	2–3	BBTS Bielsko-Biała	22–25	17–25	25–22	25–22	13–15	102–109	
28 Dec	20:30	Barkom-Kazhany Lviv	0–3	Projekt Warsaw	17–25	21–25	24–26			62–76	
29 Dec	16:15	Jastrzębski Węgiel	2–3	LUK Lublin	19–25	25–23	30–28	22–25	13–15	109–116	
30 Dec	17:30	ZAKSA Kędzierzyn-Koźle	3–1	Aluron CMC Warta Zawiercie	20–25	25–18	27–25	25–22		97–90	
30 Dec	20:30	PGE Skra Bełchatów	2–3	PSG Stal Nysa	25–20	25–21	16–25	21–25	12–15	99–106	
3 Jan	17:30	Ślepsk Malow Suwałki	1–3	Asseco Resovia	25–23	19–25	24–26	22–25		90–99	
17 Jan	20:30	GKS Katowice	1–3	Indykpol AZS Olsztyn	37–39	14–25	25–21	22–25		98–110	
8 Mar	17:30	Cuprum Lubin	2–3	Trefl Gdańsk	25–23	23–25	27–25	19–25	12–15	106–113	

=== 19th round ===
Date	Time		Score		Set 1	Set 2	Set 3	Set 4	Set 5	Total	Report
6 Jan	17:30	Aluron CMC Warta Zawiercie	3–2	Jastrzębski Węgiel	22–25	25–21	22–25	27–25	15–9	111–105	
6 Jan	20:30	BBTS Bielsko-Biała	0–3	ZAKSA Kędzierzyn-Koźle	23–25	23–25	19–25			65–75	
7 Jan	14:45	LUK Lublin	3–1	Indykpol AZS Olsztyn	23–25	25–21	25–19	25–23		98–88	
7 Jan	17:30	Trefl Gdańsk	3–1	PGE Skra Bełchatów	25–18	25–16	19–25	25–15		94–74	
7 Jan	20:30	Projekt Warsaw	3–0	Ślepsk Malow Suwałki	25–14	27–25	25–17			77–56	
8 Jan	17:30	PSG Stal Nysa	3–1	Cerrad Enea Czarni Radom	29–27	21–25	25–20	25–20		100–92	
8 Jan	20:30	Asseco Resovia	2–3	Cuprum Lubin	17–25	25–12	25–23	30–32	9–15	106–107	
9 Jan	17:30	Barkom-Kazhany Lviv	3–0	GKS Katowice	25–18	26–24	30–28			81–70	

=== 20th round ===
Date	Time		Score		Set 1	Set 2	Set 3	Set 4	Set 5	Total	Report
13 Jan	20:30	GKS Katowice	0–3	LUK Lublin	18–25	22–25	21–25			61–75	
14 Jan	14:45	Indykpol AZS Olsztyn	3–0	Aluron CMC Warta Zawiercie	25–20	25–20	30–28			80–68	
14 Jan	20:30	Ślepsk Malow Suwałki	3–0	Barkom-Kazhany Lviv	25–21	25–18	25–15			75–54	
15 Jan	14:45	Asseco Resovia	3–0	PGE Skra Bełchatów	25–20	25–21	25–13			75–54	
15 Jan	17:30	Cerrad Enea Czarni Radom	1–3	Trefl Gdańsk	25–18	23–25	17–25	35–37		100–105	
15 Jan	20:30	Jastrzębski Węgiel	3–0	BBTS Bielsko-Biała	25–17	25–19	25–19			75–55	
16 Jan	17:30	Cuprum Lubin	0–3	Projekt Warsaw	21–25	17–25	23–25			61–75	
16 Jan	20:30	ZAKSA Kędzierzyn-Koźle	3–0	PSG Stal Nysa	25–22	25–19	25–21			75–62	

=== 21st round ===
Date	Time		Score		Set 1	Set 2	Set 3	Set 4	Set 5	Total	Report
19 Jan	17:30	Trefl Gdańsk	3–1	ZAKSA Kędzierzyn-Koźle	25–22	22–25	25–18	25–23		97–88	
20 Jan	17:30	BBTS Bielsko-Biała	1–3	Indykpol AZS Olsztyn	20–25	17–25	25–22	19–25		81–97	
20 Jan	20:30	Asseco Resovia	3–0	Cerrad Enea Czarni Radom	25–21	25–23	25–20			75–64	
21 Jan	14:45	Aluron CMC Warta Zawiercie	3–1	LUK Lublin	25–21	18–25	25–19	25–17		93–82	
21 Jan	17:30	Barkom-Kazhany Lviv	3–1	Cuprum Lubin	22–25	25–22	37–35	25–18		109–100	
22 Jan	14:45	Projekt Warsaw	3–2	PGE Skra Bełchatów	22–25	25–22	22–25	25–21	27–25	121–118	
22 Jan	17:30	Ślepsk Malow Suwałki	3–0	GKS Katowice	25–22	25–20	25–14			75–56	
22 Jan	20:30	Jastrzębski Węgiel	3–1	PSG Stal Nysa	22–25	25–18	25–23	25–16		97–82	

=== 22nd round ===
Date	Time		Score		Set 1	Set 2	Set 3	Set 4	Set 5	Total	Report
27 Jan	17:30	Indykpol AZS Olsztyn	3–1	PSG Stal Nysa	26–24	22–25	25–15	25–21		98–85	
28 Jan	14:45	ZAKSA Kędzierzyn-Koźle	3–1	Asseco Resovia	25–23	25–22	20–25	25–19		95–89	
28 Jan	17:30	Jastrzębski Węgiel	3–0	Trefl Gdańsk	37–35	25–20	25–20			87–75	
28 Jan	20:30	GKS Katowice	3–0	Aluron CMC Warta Zawiercie	25–23	25–23	25–19			75–65	
29 Jan	14:45	LUK Lublin	3–1	BBTS Bielsko-Biała	21–25	25–16	25–15	25–12		96–68	
29 Jan	20:30	PGE Skra Bełchatów	0–3	Barkom-Kazhany Lviv	26–28	23–25	19–25			68–78	
30 Jan	17:30	Cuprum Lubin	3–2	Ślepsk Malow Suwałki	18–25	25–18	22–25	25–21	15–9	105–98	
30 Jan	20:30	Cerrad Enea Czarni Radom	0–3	Projekt Warsaw	18–25	18–25	18–25			54–75	

=== 23rd round ===
Date	Time		Score		Set 1	Set 2	Set 3	Set 4	Set 5	Total	Report
3 Feb	17:30	BBTS Bielsko-Biała	2–3	Aluron CMC Warta Zawiercie	19–25	10–25	25–22	25–23	10–15	89–110	
4 Feb	14:45	Projekt Warsaw	3–1	ZAKSA Kędzierzyn-Koźle	25–21	25–13	19–25	25–21		94–80	
4 Feb	17:30	PSG Stal Nysa	3–0	LUK Lublin	25–21	25–18	25–23			75–62	
5 Feb	14:45	Ślepsk Malow Suwałki	3–0	PGE Skra Bełchatów	25–20	28–26	25–22			78–68	
5 Feb	17:30	Barkom-Kazhany Lviv	0–3	Cerrad Enea Czarni Radom	16–25	17–25	25–27			58–77	
6 Feb	20:30	Cuprum Lubin	0–3	GKS Katowice	18–25	16–25	17–25			51–75	
24 Feb	17:30	Trefl Gdańsk	3–0	Indykpol AZS Olsztyn	27–25	25–23	25–22			77–70	
22 Mar	17:30	Asseco Resovia	2–3	Jastrzębski Węgiel	25–21	18–25	25–20	18–25	15–17	101–108	

=== 24th round ===
Date	Time		Score		Set 1	Set 2	Set 3	Set 4	Set 5	Total	Report
9 Feb	17:30	Indykpol AZS Olsztyn	1–3	Asseco Resovia	14–25	22–25	25–22	32–34		93–106	
10 Feb	20:30	Cerrad Enea Czarni Radom	0–3	Ślepsk Malow Suwałki	25–27	19–25	16–25			60–77	
11 Feb	14:45	Jastrzębski Węgiel	1–3	Projekt Warsaw	18–25	25–17	21–25	22–25		86–92	
11 Feb	17:30	ZAKSA Kędzierzyn-Koźle	3–0	Barkom-Kazhany Lviv	30–28	25–21	25–16			80–65	
11 Feb	20:30	LUK Lublin	0–3	Trefl Gdańsk	17–25	17–25	22–25			56–75	
12 Feb	14:45	Aluron CMC Warta Zawiercie	3–0	PSG Stal Nysa	25–19	25–17	25–15			75–51	
12 Feb	17:30	PGE Skra Bełchatów	2–3	Cuprum Lubin	25–18	25–21	23–25	23–25	17–19	113–108	
12 Feb	20:30	GKS Katowice	2–3	BBTS Bielsko-Biała	18–25	25–22	25–27	25–23	10–15	103–112	

=== 25th round ===
Date	Time		Score		Set 1	Set 2	Set 3	Set 4	Set 5	Total	Report
17 Feb	20:30	BBTS Bielsko-Biała	0–3	PSG Stal Nysa	23–25	15–25	17–25			55–75	
18 Feb	14:45	Asseco Resovia	3–1	LUK Lublin	22–25	29–27	25–18	25–17		101–87	
18 Feb	17:30	Cuprum Lubin	3–2	Cerrad Enea Czarni Radom	18–25	25–19	24–26	25–19	15–12	107–101	
18 Feb	20:30	Barkom-Kazhany Lviv	0–3	Jastrzębski Węgiel	10–25	20–25	14–25			44–75	
19 Feb	14:45	Trefl Gdańsk	1–3	Aluron CMC Warta Zawiercie	25–21	17–25	23–25	14–25		79–96	
19 Feb	17:30	Projekt Warsaw	3–1	Indykpol AZS Olsztyn	26–24	25–19	21–25	25–16		97–84	
20 Feb	20:30	PGE Skra Bełchatów	2–3	GKS Katowice	25–27	26–24	20–25	29–27	11–15	111–118	
21 Mar	17:30	Ślepsk Malow Suwałki	1–3	ZAKSA Kędzierzyn-Koźle	25–18	27–29	13–25	23–25		88–97	

=== 26th round ===
Date	Time		Score		Set 1	Set 2	Set 3	Set 4	Set 5	Total	Report
2 Mar	17:30	BBTS Bielsko-Biała	1–3	Trefl Gdańsk	25–23	14–25	22–25	23–25		84–98	
3 Mar	17:30	Indykpol AZS Olsztyn	3–0	Barkom-Kazhany Lviv	25–17	25–22	25–17			75–56	
4 Mar	14:45	Aluron CMC Warta Zawiercie	3–0	Asseco Resovia	25–19	25–16	25–22			75–57	
4 Mar	17:30	Jastrzębski Węgiel	3–1	Ślepsk Malow Suwałki	25–15	25–18	22–25	25–13		97–71	
4 Mar	20:30	ZAKSA Kędzierzyn-Koźle	3–1	Cuprum Lubin	23–25	25–21	25–21	25–20		98–87	
5 Mar	14:45	LUK Lublin	1–3	Projekt Warsaw	25–23	22–25	20–25	13–25		80–98	
5 Mar	17:30	Cerrad Enea Czarni Radom	1–3	PGE Skra Bełchatów	25–23	23–25	24–26	17–25		89–99	
6 Mar	20:30	GKS Katowice	3–0	PSG Stal Nysa	25–17	25–19	25–19			75–55	

=== 27th round ===
Date	Time		Score		Set 1	Set 2	Set 3	Set 4	Set 5	Total	Report
10 Mar	20:30	Ślepsk Malow Suwałki	0–3	Indykpol AZS Olsztyn	22–25	22–25	22–25			66–75	
11 Mar	14:45	Projekt Warsaw	3–2	Aluron CMC Warta Zawiercie	29–27	32–34	22–25	25–19	15–10	123–115	
11 Mar	17:30	Cuprum Lubin	0–3	Jastrzębski Węgiel	23–25	20–25	36–38			79–88	
11 Mar	20:30	Cerrad Enea Czarni Radom	0–3	GKS Katowice	16–25	19–25	25–27			60–77	
12 Mar	14:45	ZAKSA Kędzierzyn-Koźle	0–3	PGE Skra Bełchatów	20–25	18–25	20–25			58–75	
12 Mar	17:30	Trefl Gdańsk	3–0	PSG Stal Nysa	25–17	25–18	25–22			75–57	
13 Mar	17:30	Barkom-Kazhany Lviv	3–0	LUK Lublin	25–22	25–21	25–20			75–63	
13 Mar	20:30	Asseco Resovia	3–0	BBTS Bielsko-Biała	27–25	25–17	25–19			77–61	

=== 28th round ===
Date	Time		Score		Set 1	Set 2	Set 3	Set 4	Set 5	Total	Report
16 Mar	17:30	GKS Katowice	0–3	Trefl Gdańsk	22–25	20–25	21–25			63–75	
17 Mar	17:30	PSG Stal Nysa	1–3	Asseco Resovia	18–25	25–27	25–22	17–25		85–99	
18 Mar	14:45	LUK Lublin	3–1	Ślepsk Malow Suwałki	25–21	25–23	29–31	25–16		104–91	
18 Mar	20:30	Aluron CMC Warta Zawiercie	3–1	Barkom-Kazhany Lviv	25–14	25–13	17–25	25–15		92–67	
19 Mar	17:30	Cerrad Enea Czarni Radom	1–3	ZAKSA Kędzierzyn-Koźle	10–25	25–22	22–25	23–25		80–97	
19 Mar	20:30	Jastrzębski Węgiel	2–3	PGE Skra Bełchatów	22–25	25–22	25–19	21–25	13–15	106–106	
20 Mar	17:30	BBTS Bielsko-Biała	1–3	Projekt Warsaw	25–15	13–25	21–25	17–25		76–90	
20 Mar	20:30	Cuprum Lubin	2–3	Indykpol AZS Olsztyn	23–25	25–21	29–27	21–25	11–15	109–113	

=== 29th round ===
Date	Time		Score		Set 1	Set 2	Set 3	Set 4	Set 5	Total	Report
23 Mar	20:30	Barkom-Kazhany Lviv	3–1	BBTS Bielsko-Biała	15–25	25–18	25–18	25–18		90–79	
25 Mar	14:45	Ślepsk Malow Suwałki	1–3	Aluron CMC Warta Zawiercie	20–25	25–23	17–25	17–25		79–98	
25 Mar	17:30	Cerrad Enea Czarni Radom	0–3	Jastrzębski Węgiel	16–25	15–25	21–25			52–75	
25 Mar	20:30	Cuprum Lubin	1–3	LUK Lublin	21–25	21–25	25–23	20–25		87–98	
26 Mar	14:45	Asseco Resovia	3–1	Trefl Gdańsk	25–27	25–22	25–18	28–26		103–93	
26 Mar	17:30	ZAKSA Kędzierzyn-Koźle	3–0	GKS Katowice	25–22	25–14	25–16			75–52	
26 Mar	20:30	Projekt Warsaw	3–2	PSG Stal Nysa	25–17	16–25	18–25	25–17	15–8	99–92	
27 Mar	20:30	PGE Skra Bełchatów	0–3	Indykpol AZS Olsztyn	23–25	19–25	22–25			64–75	

=== 30th round ===
Date	Time		Score		Set 1	Set 2	Set 3	Set 4	Set 5	Total	Report
24 Feb	20:30	PSG Stal Nysa	3–0	Barkom-Kazhany Lviv	25–20	25–23	25–23			75–66	
31 Mar	17:30	Aluron CMC Warta Zawiercie	3–2	Cuprum Lubin	22–25	25–22	25–11	21–25	15–13	108–96	
31 Mar	20:30	GKS Katowice	0–3	Asseco Resovia	18–25	21–25	21–25			60–75	
1 Apr	20:30	ZAKSA Kędzierzyn-Koźle	3–1	Jastrzębski Węgiel	23–25	25–23	25–22	25–20		98–90	
2 Apr	18:00	Trefl Gdańsk	3–2	Projekt Warsaw	21–25	25–17	25–23	15–25	15–12	101–102	
2 Apr	20:30	Indykpol AZS Olsztyn	3–1	Cerrad Enea Czarni Radom	24–26	25–21	25–13	25–21		99–81	
3 Apr	17:30	BBTS Bielsko-Biała	0–3	Ślepsk Malow Suwałki	12–25	18–25	23–25			53–75	
3 Apr	20:30	LUK Lublin	3–0	PGE Skra Bełchatów	25–19	25–19	25–21			75–59	

== Playoffs ==
- (to 3 victories)

Quarterfinals
1	Asseco Resovia	3
8	PSG Stal Nysa	0
5	Projekt Warsaw	1
4	ZAKSA Kędzierzyn-Koźle	3
3	Jastrzębski Węgiel	3
6	Trefl Gdańsk	0
7	Indykpol AZS Olsztyn	2
2	Aluron CMC Warta Zawiercie	3

Semifinals
1	Asseco Resovia	0
4	ZAKSA Kędzierzyn-Koźle	3
3	Jastrzębski Węgiel	3
2	Aluron CMC Warta Zawiercie	0

Finals
4	ZAKSA Kędzierzyn-Koźle	0
3	Jastrzębski Węgiel	3

=== Quarterfinals ===
==== Quarterfinal A ====
Date	Time		Score		Set 1	Set 2	Set 3	Set 4	Set 5	Total	Report
7 Apr	17:30	Asseco Resovia	3–0	PSG Stal Nysa	25–21	25–18	26–24			76–63	
8 Apr	17:30	Asseco Resovia	3–0	PSG Stal Nysa	25–12	25–23	25–20			75–55	
14 Apr	17:30	PSG Stal Nysa	1–3	Asseco Resovia	26–24	19–25	20–25	18–25		83–99	

==== Quarterfinal B ====
Date	Time		Score		Set 1	Set 2	Set 3	Set 4	Set 5	Total	Report
6 Apr	17:30	Aluron CMC Warta Zawiercie	3–0	Indykpol AZS Olsztyn	25–13	25–20	25–21			75–54	
7 Apr	20:30	Aluron CMC Warta Zawiercie	3–0	Indykpol AZS Olsztyn	25–22	25–23	25–21			75–66	
15 Apr	14:45	Indykpol AZS Olsztyn	3–2	Aluron CMC Warta Zawiercie	22–25	25–16	25–15	18–25	15–13	105–94	
16 Apr	14:45	Indykpol AZS Olsztyn	3–0	Aluron CMC Warta Zawiercie	25–23	25–16	25–23			75–62	
19 Apr	17:30	Aluron CMC Warta Zawiercie	3–1	Indykpol AZS Olsztyn	25–23	24–26	30–28	25–23		104–100	

==== Quarterfinal C ====
Date	Time		Score		Set 1	Set 2	Set 3	Set 4	Set 5	Total	Report
8 Apr	14:45	Jastrzębski Węgiel	3–0	Trefl Gdańsk	25–19	25–17	25–18			75–54	
9 Apr	17:30	Jastrzębski Węgiel	3–0	Trefl Gdańsk	25–23	25–12	25–17			75–52	
12 Apr	20:30	Trefl Gdańsk	1–3	Jastrzębski Węgiel	23–25	27–25	18–25	22–25		90–100	

==== Quarterfinal D ====
Date	Time		Score		Set 1	Set 2	Set 3	Set 4	Set 5	Total	Report
9 Apr	14:45	ZAKSA Kędzierzyn-Koźle	3–2	Projekt Warsaw	17–25	25–20	25–20	24–26	15–10	106–101	
10 Apr	14:45	ZAKSA Kędzierzyn-Koźle	3–2	Projekt Warsaw	25–22	18–25	17–25	25–23	15–13	100–108	
14 Apr	20:30	Projekt Warsaw	3–2	ZAKSA Kędzierzyn-Koźle	20–25	26–24	18–25	25–16	15–12	104–102	
15 Apr	20:30	Projekt Warsaw	1–3	ZAKSA Kędzierzyn-Koźle	25–23	23–25	19–25	20–25		87–98	

=== Semifinals ===
==== Semifinal A ====
Date	Time		Score		Set 1	Set 2	Set 3	Set 4	Set 5	Total	Report
22 Apr	14:45	Asseco Resovia	2–3	ZAKSA Kędzierzyn-Koźle	25–22	25–13	21–25	16–25	12–15	99–100	
23 Apr	14:45	Asseco Resovia	1–3	ZAKSA Kędzierzyn-Koźle	21–25	25–27	25–18	18–25		89–95	
26 Apr	17:30	ZAKSA Kędzierzyn-Koźle	3–2	Asseco Resovia	25–19	19–25	25–23	26–28	15–12	110–107	

==== Semifinal B ====
Date	Time		Score		Set 1	Set 2	Set 3	Set 4	Set 5	Total	Report
22 Apr	20:30	Aluron CMC Warta Zawiercie	1–3	Jastrzębski Węgiel	13–25	25–20	20–25	19–25		77–95	
23 Apr	20:30	Aluron CMC Warta Zawiercie	2–3	Jastrzębski Węgiel	20–25	29–27	25–27	29–27	8–15	111–121	
26 Apr	20:30	Jastrzębski Węgiel	3–0	Aluron CMC Warta Zawiercie	25–13	25–17	25–21			75–51	

=== Finals ===
Date	Time		Score		Set 1	Set 2	Set 3	Set 4	Set 5	Total	Report
3 May	20:30	Jastrzębski Węgiel	3–0	ZAKSA Kędzierzyn-Koźle	25–20	25–20	25–23			75–63	
6 May	14:45	ZAKSA Kędzierzyn-Koźle	1–3	Jastrzębski Węgiel	26–24	22–25	15–25	19–25		82–99	
10 May	20:30	Jastrzębski Węgiel	3–0	ZAKSA Kędzierzyn-Koźle	25–15	25–16	25–13			75–44	

== Placement matches ==
=== 13th place ===
- (to 2 victories)

Date	Time		Score		Set 1	Set 2	Set 3	Set 4	Set 5	Total	Report
16 Apr	20:30	Cuprum Lubin	0–3	Barkom-Kazhany Lviv	25–27	22–25	19–25			66–77	
17 Apr	17:30	Barkom-Kazhany Lviv	3–2	Cuprum Lubin	23–25	21–25	25–21	25–19	15–9	109–99	

=== 11th place ===
- (to 2 victories)

Date	Time		Score		Set 1	Set 2	Set 3	Set 4	Set 5	Total	Report
13 Apr	20:30	GKS Katowice	3–1	PGE Skra Bełchatów	26–24	25–21	22–25	25–21		98–91	
18 Apr	17:30	PGE Skra Bełchatów	3–0	GKS Katowice	25–18	25–21	25–20			75–59	
Golden set		PGE Skra Bełchatów	11–15	GKS Katowice							

=== 9th place ===
- (to 2 victories)

Date	Time		Score		Set 1	Set 2	Set 3	Set 4	Set 5	Total	Report
16 Apr	17:30	Ślepsk Malow Suwałki	3–1	LUK Lublin	26–24	23–25	25–22	25–18		99–89	
18 Apr	20:30	LUK Lublin	0–3	Ślepsk Malow Suwałki	20–25	18–25	20–25			58–75	

=== 7th place ===
- (to 2 victories)

Date	Time		Score		Set 1	Set 2	Set 3	Set 4	Set 5	Total	Report
21 Apr	20:30	PSG Stal Nysa	3–1	Indykpol AZS Olsztyn	25–21	23–25	25–17	25–21		98–84	
24 Apr	17:30	Indykpol AZS Olsztyn	0–3	PSG Stal Nysa	16–25	17–25	14–25			47–75	

=== 5th place ===
- (to 2 victories)

Date	Time		Score		Set 1	Set 2	Set 3	Set 4	Set 5	Total	Report
24 Apr	20:30	Trefl Gdańsk	1–3	Projekt Warsaw	21–25	20–25	25–18	25–27		91–95	
28 Apr	20:30	Projekt Warsaw	2–3	Trefl Gdańsk	23–25	20–25	25–19	25–19	13–15	106–103	
Golden set		Projekt Warsaw	15–10	Trefl Gdańsk							

=== 3rd place ===
- (to 3 victories)

Date	Time		Score		Set 1	Set 2	Set 3	Set 4	Set 5	Total	Report
2 May	20:30	Asseco Resovia	2–3	Aluron CMC Warta Zawiercie	22–25	27–25	18–25	25–21	9–15	101–111	
6 May	17:30	Aluron CMC Warta Zawiercie	1–3	Asseco Resovia	25–13	22–25	23–25	17–25		87–88	
9 May	20:30	Asseco Resovia	3–0	Aluron CMC Warta Zawiercie	25–19	25–22	25–23			75–64	
13 May	14:45	Aluron CMC Warta Zawiercie	3–2	Asseco Resovia	19–25	19–25	25–17	25–23	15–9	103–99	
16 May	20:30	Asseco Resovia	3–0	Aluron CMC Warta Zawiercie	25–23	25–13	25–21			75–57	

== Final standings ==
Qualified for the 2023–24 CEV Champions League
Qualified for the 2023–24 CEV Cup
Qualified for the 2023–24 CEV Challenge Cup
Relegation to the 1st league

Rank	Team
1st place, gold medalist(s)	Jastrzębski Węgiel
2nd place, silver medalist(s)	ZAKSA Kędzierzyn-Koźle
3rd place, bronze medalist(s)	Asseco Resovia
4	Aluron CMC Warta Zawiercie
5	Projekt Warsaw
6	Trefl Gdańsk
7	PSG Stal Nysa
8	Indykpol AZS Olsztyn
9	Ślepsk Malow Suwałki
10	LUK Lublin
11	GKS Katowice
12	PGE Skra Bełchatów
13	Barkom-Kazhany Lviv
14	Cuprum Lubin
15	Cerrad Enea Czarni Radom
16	BBTS Bielsko-Biała

2023 Polish champions
Jastrzębski Węgiel
3rd title

== Squads ==
Aluron CMC Warta Zawiercie
No.	Name	Date of birth	Height	Position
1	(Poland) Marcin Waliński	24 October 1990	1.96 m (6 ft 5 in)	outside hitter
2	(Poland) Bartosz Kwolek	17 July 1997	1.93 m (6 ft 4 in)	outside hitter
4	(Poland) Krzysztof Rejno	22 February 1993	2.03 m (6 ft 8 in)	middle blocker
5	(Poland) Miłosz Zniszczoł	2 July 1986	2.00 m (6 ft 7 in)	middle blocker
6	(Poland) Dawid Konarski	31 August 1989	1.98 m (6 ft 6 in)	opposite
8	(Poland) Jędrzej Gruszczyński	13 November 1997	1.86 m (6 ft 1 in)	libero
8	(Poland) Tomasz Kalembka	30 June 1991	2.05 m (6 ft 9 in)	middle blocker
9	(Argentina) Santiago Danani	12 December 1995	1.76 m (5 ft 9 in)	libero
15	(Portugal) Miguel Tavares	2 March 1993	1.92 m (6 ft 4 in)	setter
16	(Poland) Bartosz Makoś	1 August 1998	1.76 m (5 ft 9 in)	libero
18	(Poland) Michał Kozłowski	16 February 1985	1.91 m (6 ft 3 in)	setter
19	(Poland) Dawid Dulski	1 November 2002	2.10 m (6 ft 11 in)	opposite
20	(Poland) Wiktor Rajsner	13 April 1999	2.05 m (6 ft 9 in)	middle blocker
25	(Poland) Michał Szalacha	15 January 1994	2.02 m (6 ft 8 in)	middle blocker
93	(Serbia) Uroš Kovačević	6 May 1993	1.97 m (6 ft 6 in)	outside hitter
99	(Poland) Patryk Łaba	30 July 1991	1.88 m (6 ft 2 in)	outside hitter
Head coach:		(Poland) Michał Winiarski		

Asseco Resovia
No.	Name	Date of birth	Height	Position
1	(Poland) Bartłomiej Krulicki	15 September 1993	2.05 m (6 ft 9 in)	middle blocker
2	(Poland) Maciej Muzaj	21 May 1994	2.07 m (6 ft 9 in)	opposite
3	(Poland) Michał Kędzierski	9 August 1994	1.94 m (6 ft 4 in)	setter
4	(Slovenia) Jan Kozamernik	24 December 1995	2.05 m (6 ft 9 in)	middle blocker
5	(Poland) Jakub Bucki	13 August 1988	1.97 m (6 ft 6 in)	opposite
6	(Brazil) Maurício Borges	4 February 1989	1.99 m (6 ft 6 in)	outside hitter
7	(Poland) Jakub Kochanowski	17 July 1997	1.99 m (6 ft 6 in)	middle blocker
8	(France) Thibault Rossard	28 August 1993	1.94 m (6 ft 4 in)	outside hitter
10	(Poland) Tomasz Piotrowski	2 September 1997	1.98 m (6 ft 6 in)	outside hitter
11	(Poland) Fabian Drzyzga	3 January 1990	1.96 m (6 ft 5 in)	setter
13	(Poland) Michał Potera	6 March 1988	1.83 m (6 ft 0 in)	libero
16	(Poland) Paweł Zatorski	21 June 1990	1.84 m (6 ft 0 in)	libero
17	(Poland) Bartłomiej Mordyl	21 January 1995	2.01 m (6 ft 7 in)	middle blocker
18	(Slovenia) Klemen Čebulj	21 February 1992	2.02 m (6 ft 8 in)	outside hitter
59	(United States) Torey DeFalco	10 April 1997	1.98 m (6 ft 6 in)	outside hitter
Head coach:		(Italy) Giampaolo Medei		

Barkom-Kazhany Lviv
No.	Name	Date of birth	Height	Position
1	(Norway) Jonas Kvalen	6 June 1992	1.96 m (6 ft 5 in)	outside hitter
3	(Ukraine) Bohdan Mazenko	18 May 1996	1.98 m (6 ft 6 in)	middle blocker
4	(Ukraine) Oleh Shevchenko	8 January 1993	1.94 m (6 ft 4 in)	outside hitter
6	(Ukraine) Oleksii Holoven	12 January 1999	1.96 m (6 ft 5 in)	setter
10	(Ukraine) Andrii Zhukov	25 March 1999	1.83 m (6 ft 0 in)	libero
11	(Ukraine) Dmytro Kanaiev	3 October 1997	1.77 m (5 ft 10 in)	libero
12	(Ukraine) Vladyslav Shchurov	27 April 2001	2.07 m (6 ft 9 in)	middle blocker
13	(Ukraine) Vasyl Tupchii	13 January 1992	1.96 m (6 ft 5 in)	opposite
14	(Ukraine) Illia Dovhyi	1 August 1998	2.00 m (6 ft 7 in)	middle blocker
15	(Ukraine) Volodymyr Tevkun	3 September 1988	2.05 m (6 ft 9 in)	opposite
16	(Ukraine) Vitalii Kucher	27 October 1997	1.99 m (6 ft 6 in)	outside hitter
17	(Turkey) Murat Yenipazar	23 September 1993	1.93 m (6 ft 4 in)	setter
22	(Slovakia) Julius Firkal	14 January 1998	1.97 m (6 ft 6 in)	outside hitter
23	(Ukraine) Tymur Tsmokalo	23 December 2003	1.97 m (6 ft 6 in)	outside hitter
25	(Ukraine) Artem Smoliar	4 February 1985	2.09 m (6 ft 10 in)	middle blocker
Head coach:		(Latvia) Uģis Krastiņš		

BBTS Bielsko-Biała
No.	Name	Date of birth	Height	Position
1	(Australia) Arshdeep Dosanjh	30 July 1996	2.05 m (6 ft 9 in)	setter
2	(Poland) Dawid Woch	16 May 1997	2.00 m (6 ft 7 in)	middle blocker
4	(Poland) Wojciech Siek	1 May 1994	2.05 m (6 ft 9 in)	middle blocker
6	(Poland) Mateusz Zawalski	7 February 1995	1.98 m (6 ft 6 in)	middle blocker
7	(Poland) Radosław Gil	25 January 1997	1.90 m (6 ft 3 in)	setter
8	(Hungary) Roland Gergye	24 February 1993	1.98 m (6 ft 6 in)	outside hitter
9	(Poland) Jakub Urbanowicz	14 August 1993	2.03 m (6 ft 8 in)	outside hitter
10	(Poland) Adrian Hunek	28 October 1985	2.03 m (6 ft 8 in)	middle blocker
11	(Poland) Bartosz Fijałek	30 August 2003	1.77 m (5 ft 10 in)	libero
12	(Canada) Daulton Sinoski	7 April 1997	2.03 m (6 ft 8 in)	opposite
13	(Poland) Radosław Puczkowski	2 January 2003	2.00 m (6 ft 7 in)	outside hitter
17	(Germany) Jan Zimmermann	12 February 1993	1.90 m (6 ft 3 in)	setter
19	(Serbia) Konstantin Čupković	2 January 1987	2.05 m (6 ft 9 in)	outside hitter
20	(Poland) Dominik Teklak	17 March 2000	1.84 m (6 ft 0 in)	libero
21	(Poland) Konrad Formela	8 March 1995	1.94 m (6 ft 4 in)	outside hitter
22	(United States) Jake Hanes	3 May 1998	2.08 m (6 ft 10 in)	opposite
23	(Romania) Ovidiu Darlaczi	1 February 1999	2.02 m (6 ft 8 in)	outside hitter
33	(France) Pierre Pujol	13 July 1984	1.86 m (6 ft 1 in)	setter
Head coach:		(Netherlands) Arie Cornelis Brokking → (Ukraine) Serhiy Kapelus		

Cerrad Enea Czarni Radom
No.	Name	Date of birth	Height	Position
1	(Poland) Damian Schulz	26 February 1990	2.08 m (6 ft 10 in)	opposite
2	(Poland) Michał Ostrowski	29 March 1990	2.03 m (6 ft 8 in)	middle blocker
3	(Poland) Wiktor Nowak	21 May 1999	1.86 m (6 ft 1 in)	setter
4	(Estonia) Timo Tammemaa	18 November 1991	2.04 m (6 ft 8 in)	middle blocker
5	(Brazil) Maurício Borges	4 February 1989	1.99 m (6 ft 6 in)	outside hitter
6	(Poland) Piotr Łukasik	11 July 1994	2.08 m (6 ft 10 in)	outside hitter
7	(Poland) Bartłomiej Lemański	19 March 1996	2.16 m (7 ft 1 in)	middle blocker
8	(Poland) Paweł Rusin	5 March 1992	1.82 m (6 ft 0 in)	outside hitter
9	(Poland) Daniel Gąsior	9 January 1995	2.00 m (6 ft 7 in)	opposite
11	(Poland) Sebastian Warda	18 January 1989	2.04 m (6 ft 8 in)	middle blocker
12	(Poland) Paweł Woicki	19 June 1983	1.82 m (6 ft 0 in)	setter
13	(Poland) Mateusz Masłowski	13 June 1997	1.85 m (6 ft 1 in)	libero
15	(United States) Matthew West	1 October 1993	1.98 m (6 ft 6 in)	setter
17	(Poland) Bartosz Firszt	19 March 1999	1.98 m (6 ft 6 in)	outside hitter
18	(Poland) Maciej Nowowsiak	20 September 2001	1.88 m (6 ft 2 in)	libero
Head coach:		(Poland) Jacek Nawrocki → (Poland) Paweł Woicki		

Cuprum Lubin
No.	Name	Date of birth	Height	Position
3	(Poland) Maciej Sas	10 November 1998	1.80 m (5 ft 11 in)	libero
5	(Poland) Wojciech Ferens	5 April 1991	1.94 m (6 ft 4 in)	outside hitter
6	(Poland) Adam Lorenc	30 October 1998	1.98 m (6 ft 6 in)	opposite
7	(Poland) Kajetan Kubicki	9 February 2003	1.90 m (6 ft 3 in)	setter
8	(Poland) Moustapha M'Baye	22 January 1992	1.98 m (6 ft 6 in)	middle blocker
8	(Poland) Damian Czetowicz	26 February 2002	1.95 m (6 ft 5 in)	setter
9	(Poland) Paweł Pietraszko	5 October 1990	2.01 m (6 ft 7 in)	middle blocker
10	(Poland) Remigiusz Kapica	28 September 2000	1.99 m (6 ft 6 in)	opposite
11	(Poland) Dominik Czerny	4 April 2003	1.96 m (6 ft 5 in)	outside hitter
12	(Germany) Florian Krage	11 January 1997	2.04 m (6 ft 8 in)	middle blocker
14	(Poland) Grzegorz Pająk	1 January 1987	1.96 m (6 ft 5 in)	setter
16	(Poland) Jędrzej Kaźmierczak	23 September 2000	1.99 m (6 ft 6 in)	middle blocker
18	(Ukraine) Illia Kovalov	31 August 1996	1.98 m (6 ft 6 in)	outside hitter
20	(Poland) Kamil Szymura	24 January 1999	1.85 m (6 ft 1 in)	libero
23	(Austria) Alexander Berger	27 September 1988	1.93 m (6 ft 4 in)	outside hitter
44	(Poland) Jakub Ziobrowski	23 January 1997	2.02 m (6 ft 8 in)	opposite
Head coach:		(Poland) Paweł Rusek		

GKS Katowice
No.	Name	Date of birth	Height	Position
2	(Poland) Jakub Szymański	25 March 1998	2.00 m (6 ft 7 in)	outside hitter
3	(Poland) Wiktor Mielczarek	10 January 1998	1.90 m (6 ft 3 in)	outside hitter
4	(Poland) Bartosz Mariański	26 May 1992	1.87 m (6 ft 2 in)	libero
7	(Poland) Jakub Jarosz	10 February 1987	1.97 m (6 ft 6 in)	opposite
8	(Poland) Jakub Lewandowski	16 July 1996	2.03 m (6 ft 8 in)	middle blocker
9	(Poland) Marcin Kania	14 February 1996	2.03 m (6 ft 8 in)	middle blocker
10	(Poland) Damian Domagała	23 April 1998	1.99 m (6 ft 6 in)	opposite
11	(Poland) Jakub Nowosielski	11 February 1993	1.93 m (6 ft 4 in)	setter
12	(Bulgaria) Georgi Seganov	10 June 1993	1.98 m (6 ft 6 in)	setter
13	(Poland) Sebastian Adamczyk	28 February 1999	2.08 m (6 ft 10 in)	middle blocker
14	(Belgium) Tomas Rousseaux	31 March 1994	1.99 m (6 ft 6 in)	outside hitter
16	(Poland) Piotr Hain	26 February 1991	2.07 m (6 ft 9 in)	middle blocker
19	(Argentina) Gonzalo Quiroga	25 February 1993	1.92 m (6 ft 4 in)	outside hitter
23	(Poland) Dawid Ogórek	30 July 1990	1.84 m (6 ft 0 in)	libero
Head coach:		(Poland) Grzegorz Słaby		

Indykpol AZS Olsztyn
No.	Name	Date of birth	Height	Position
1	(Poland) Bartłomiej Lipiński	16 November 1996	2.01 m (6 ft 7 in)	outside hitter
2	(Germany) Moritz Karlitzek	12 August 1996	1.91 m (6 ft 3 in)	outside hitter
4	(Poland) Jan Król	23 August 1989	1.98 m (6 ft 6 in)	opposite
5	(Poland) Karol Jankiewicz	21 February 1996	1.85 m (6 ft 1 in)	setter
6	(Netherlands) Robbert Andringa	28 April 1990	1.91 m (6 ft 3 in)	outside hitter
7	(Poland) Dawid Siwczyk	13 June 1993	1.97 m (6 ft 6 in)	middle blocker
9	(Poland) Szymon Jakubiszak	13 February 1998	2.08 m (6 ft 10 in)	middle blocker
11	(Poland) Grzegorz Pająk	1 January 1987	1.96 m (6 ft 5 in)	setter
12	(Poland) Kamil Szymendera	30 April 2003	1.92 m (6 ft 4 in)	outside hitter
13	(United States) Taylor Averill	5 March 1992	2.01 m (6 ft 7 in)	middle blocker
14	(Poland) Kuba Hawryluk	8 September 2003	1.81 m (5 ft 11 in)	libero
15	(Poland) Jakub Ciunajtis	6 August 1998	1.77 m (5 ft 10 in)	libero
16	(Poland) Mateusz Poręba	24 August 1999	2.04 m (6 ft 8 in)	middle blocker
21	(Poland) Karol Butryn	18 June 1993	1.94 m (6 ft 4 in)	opposite
91	(United States) Joshua Tuaniga	18 March 1997	1.91 m (6 ft 3 in)	setter
Head coach:		(Argentina) Javier Weber		

Jastrzębski Węgiel
No.	Name	Date of birth	Height	Position
1	(Poland) Dawid Dryja	21 July 1992	2.01 m (6 ft 7 in)	middle blocker
2	(Czech Republic) Jan Hadrava	3 June 1991	1.99 m (6 ft 6 in)	opposite
3	(Poland) Jakub Popiwczak	17 April 1996	1.80 m (5 ft 11 in)	libero
6	(France) Benjamin Toniutti	30 October 1989	1.83 m (6 ft 0 in)	setter
7	(Poland) Kamil Dębski	17 October 1997	1.98 m (6 ft 6 in)	outside hitter
8	(France) Stéphen Boyer	10 April 1996	1.96 m (6 ft 5 in)	opposite
9	(Poland) Łukasz Wiśniewski	3 February 1989	1.98 m (6 ft 6 in)	middle blocker
13	(Poland) Yuriy Gladyr	8 July 1984	2.02 m (6 ft 8 in)	middle blocker
14	(Finland) Eemi Tervaportti	26 July 1989	1.93 m (6 ft 4 in)	setter
17	(France) Trévor Clévenot	28 June 1994	1.99 m (6 ft 6 in)	outside hitter
18	(Poland) Maksymilian Granieczny	7 July 2005	1.77 m (5 ft 10 in)	libero
21	(Poland) Tomasz Fornal	31 August 1997	2.00 m (6 ft 7 in)	outside hitter
22	(Poland) Moustapha M'Baye	22 January 1992	1.98 m (6 ft 6 in)	middle blocker
26	(Poland) Rafał Szymura	29 August 1995	1.97 m (6 ft 6 in)	outside hitter
95	(Poland) Jakub Macyra	22 July 1995	2.02 m (6 ft 8 in)	middle blocker
Head coach:		(Argentina) Marcelo Méndez		

LUK Lublin
No.	Name	Date of birth	Height	Position
1	(Poland) Jan Nowakowski	17 May 1994	2.02 m (6 ft 8 in)	middle blocker
2	(Brazil) Cristiano Torelli	29 October 1996	1.93 m (6 ft 4 in)	setter
3	(Poland) Rafał Faryna	28 September 1994	2.00 m (6 ft 7 in)	opposite
4	(Poland) Marcin Komenda	24 May 1996	1.98 m (6 ft 6 in)	setter
6	(Poland) Mateusz Malinowski	6 May 1992	1.98 m (6 ft 6 in)	opposite
7	(Poland) Jakub Wachnik	16 February 1993	2.02 m (6 ft 8 in)	outside hitter
9	(Poland) Nicolas Szerszeń	31 December 1996	1.95 m (6 ft 5 in)	outside hitter
10	(Poland) Szymon Romać	1 October 1992	1.96 m (6 ft 5 in)	opposite
13	(Poland) Mateusz Jóźwik	30 May 1996	1.95 m (6 ft 5 in)	outside hitter
14	(United States) Jeffrey Jendryk	15 September 1995	2.05 m (6 ft 9 in)	middle blocker
16	(Poland) Konrad Stajer	30 May 1994	1.98 m (6 ft 6 in)	middle blocker
17	(Poland) Szymon Gregorowicz	7 March 1994	1.83 m (6 ft 0 in)	libero
21	(United States) Dustin Watten	27 October 1986	1.83 m (6 ft 0 in)	libero
23	(Poland) Damian Hudzik	14 May 1998	2.04 m (6 ft 8 in)	middle blocker
90	(Poland) Wojciech Włodarczyk	28 October 1990	2.00 m (6 ft 7 in)	outside hitter
Head coach:		(Poland) Dariusz Daszkiewicz		

PGE Skra Bełchatów
No.	Name	Date of birth	Height	Position
3	(Poland) Wiktor Musiał	30 March 1993	1.94 m (6 ft 4 in)	opposite
4	(Poland) Dawid Gunia	1 January 1987	2.03 m (6 ft 8 in)	middle blocker
5	(Poland) Bartłomiej Janus	19 January 1995	2.03 m (6 ft 8 in)	middle blocker
6	(Poland) Karol Kłos	8 August 1989	2.01 m (6 ft 7 in)	middle blocker
8	(Poland) Jędrzej Gruszczyński	13 November 1997	1.86 m (6 ft 1 in)	libero
11	(Italy) Dick Kooy	3 December 1987	2.02 m (6 ft 8 in)	outside hitter
12	(Czech Republic) Lukáš Vašina	6 July 1999	1.96 m (6 ft 5 in)	outside hitter
14	(Serbia) Aleksandar Atanasijević	4 September 1991	2.02 m (6 ft 8 in)	opposite
15	(Poland) Grzegorz Łomacz	1 October 1987	1.88 m (6 ft 2 in)	setter
16	(Poland) Kacper Piechocki	17 December 1995	1.85 m (6 ft 1 in)	libero
17	(Poland) Sebastian Adamczyk	28 February 1999	2.08 m (6 ft 10 in)	middle blocker
18	(Poland) Robert Milczarek	28 November 1983	1.88 m (6 ft 2 in)	libero
20	(Poland) Mateusz Bieniek	5 April 1994	2.08 m (6 ft 10 in)	middle blocker
21	(Poland) Jakub Rybicki	1 November 1998	1.95 m (6 ft 5 in)	outside hitter
26	(Serbia) Mihajlo Mitić	17 September 1990	2.01 m (6 ft 7 in)	setter
91	(Italy) Filippo Lanza	3 March 1991	1.96 m (6 ft 5 in)	outside hitter
Head coach:		(England) Joel Banks → (Italy) Andrea Gardini		

Projekt Warsaw
No.	Name	Date of birth	Height	Position
1	(Poland) Jakub Kowalczyk	26 June 1986	2.00 m (6 ft 7 in)	middle blocker
3	(Czech Republic) Kamil Baránek	2 May 1983	1.98 m (6 ft 6 in)	outside hitter
4	(Poland) Maciej Stępień	22 June 1994	1.93 m (6 ft 4 in)	setter
5	(Poland) Jan Firlej	26 September 1996	1.88 m (6 ft 2 in)	setter
7	(France) Kévin Tillie	2 November 1990	2.01 m (6 ft 7 in)	outside hitter
8	(Poland) Andrzej Wrona	27 December 1988	2.06 m (6 ft 9 in)	middle blocker
10	(Ukraine) Yurii Semeniuk	12 May 1994	2.10 m (6 ft 11 in)	middle blocker
11	(Poland) Piotr Nowakowski	18 December 1987	2.05 m (6 ft 9 in)	middle blocker
12	(Poland) Artur Szalpuk	20 March 1995	2.02 m (6 ft 8 in)	outside hitter
13	(Belgium) Igor Grobelny	8 June 1993	1.94 m (6 ft 4 in)	outside hitter
14	(Netherlands) Niels Klapwijk	19 September 1985	2.00 m (6 ft 7 in)	opposite
17	(Poland) Mateusz Janikowski	5 May 1999	2.01 m (6 ft 7 in)	outside hitter
18	(Poland) Damian Wojtaszek	7 September 1988	1.80 m (5 ft 11 in)	libero
19	(Poland) Dominik Jaglarski	20 June 1997	1.87 m (6 ft 2 in)	libero
20	(Germany) Linus Weber	1 November 1999	2.01 m (6 ft 7 in)	opposite
21	(Poland) Dawid Pawlun	22 May 2001	1.98 m (6 ft 6 in)	setter
Head coach:		(Italy) Roberto Santilli → (Poland) Piotr Graban		

PSG Stal Nysa
No.	Name	Date of birth	Height	Position
1	(Morocco) Zouheir El Graoui	1 July 1994	1.97 m (6 ft 6 in)	outside hitter
5	(Poland) Rafał Buszek	28 April 1987	1.96 m (6 ft 5 in)	outside hitter
6	(Poland) Konrad Jankowski	29 June 2002	2.04 m (6 ft 8 in)	middle blocker
8	(Poland) Dominik Kramczyński	13 January 2001	2.02 m (6 ft 8 in)	middle blocker
9	(Poland) Michał Gierżot	4 October 2001	2.03 m (6 ft 8 in)	outside hitter
10	(Tunisia) Wassim Ben Tara	3 August 1996	2.04 m (6 ft 8 in)	opposite
11	(Croatia) Tsimafei Zhukouski	18 December 1989	1.96 m (6 ft 5 in)	setter
12	(Argentina) Nicolás Zerba	13 June 1999	2.04 m (6 ft 8 in)	middle blocker
13	(Japan) Kento Miyaura	22 February 1999	1.90 m (6 ft 3 in)	opposite
14	(Poland) Jakub Abramowicz	10 April 1998	2.02 m (6 ft 8 in)	middle blocker
16	(Poland) Kamil Dembiec	7 February 1992	1.78 m (5 ft 10 in)	libero
21	(Poland) Kamil Kwasowski	13 September 1990	1.97 m (6 ft 6 in)	outside hitter
24	(Poland) Szymon Biniek	30 July 1995	1.88 m (6 ft 2 in)	libero
91	(Poland) Patryk Szczurek	6 February 1991	1.93 m (6 ft 4 in)	setter
Head coach:		(Poland) Daniel Pliński		

Ślepsk Malow Suwałki
No.	Name	Date of birth	Height	Position
1	(Argentina) Matías Sánchez	20 September 1996	1.73 m (5 ft 8 in)	setter
2	(Poland) Dominik Depowski	27 October 1995	2.00 m (6 ft 7 in)	outside hitter
5	(Poland) Arkadiusz Żakieta	13 October 1992	1.97 m (6 ft 6 in)	opposite
8	(Poland) Mariusz Magnuszewski	14 September 1997	1.94 m (6 ft 4 in)	setter
9	(Poland) Bartosz Filipiak	27 February 1994	1.97 m (6 ft 6 in)	opposite
10	(Serbia) Miran Kujundžić	19 June 1997	1.96 m (6 ft 5 in)	outside hitter
11	(Norway) Andreas Takvam	4 June 1993	2.01 m (6 ft 7 in)	middle blocker
12	(Poland) Łukasz Rudzewicz	25 January 1985	1.98 m (6 ft 6 in)	middle blocker
13	(Poland) Adrian Buchowski	30 September 1991	1.94 m (6 ft 4 in)	outside hitter
14	(Poland) Cezary Sapiński	28 September 1994	2.03 m (6 ft 8 in)	middle blocker
15	(Poland) Paweł Halaba	14 December 1995	1.94 m (6 ft 4 in)	outside hitter
16	(Poland) Paweł Filipowicz	7 May 1992	1.89 m (6 ft 2 in)	libero
22	(Poland) Przemysław Smoliński	27 November 1992	2.01 m (6 ft 7 in)	middle blocker
24	(Poland) Mateusz Czunkiewicz	16 December 1996	1.83 m (6 ft 0 in)	libero
Head coach:		(Poland) Dominik Kwapisiewicz		

Trefl Gdańsk
No.	Name	Date of birth	Height	Position
1	(Poland) Janusz Gałązka	26 April 1987	1.99 m (6 ft 6 in)	middle blocker
2	(Poland) Mariusz Wlazły	4 August 1983	1.94 m (6 ft 4 in)	opposite
3	(Argentina) Jan Martínez Franchi	28 January 1998	1.90 m (6 ft 3 in)	outside hitter
4	(Australia) Luke Perry	20 November 1995	1.80 m (5 ft 11 in)	libero
5	(Poland) Patryk Niemiec	18 February 1997	2.02 m (6 ft 8 in)	middle blocker
6	(Poland) Jakub Czerwiński	22 July 2001	1.95 m (6 ft 5 in)	outside hitter
7	(Poland) Dawid Pruszkowski	20 January 2001	1.75 m (5 ft 9 in)	libero
9	(Belarus) Aliaksei Nasevich	5 June 2003	1.97 m (6 ft 6 in)	outside hitter
10	(Poland) Bartłomiej Bołądź	28 September 1994	2.04 m (6 ft 8 in)	opposite
11	(Germany) Lukas Kampa	29 November 1986	1.93 m (6 ft 4 in)	setter
12	(Poland) Karol Urbanowicz	24 February 2001	2.00 m (6 ft 7 in)	middle blocker
15	(Poland) Mikołaj Sawicki	23 November 1999	1.98 m (6 ft 6 in)	outside hitter
17	(Poland) Piotr Orczyk	19 March 1993	1.98 m (6 ft 6 in)	outside hitter
19	(Poland) Kamil Droszyński	28 January 1997	1.90 m (6 ft 3 in)	setter
22	(China) Zhang Jingyin	20 December 1999	2.07 m (6 ft 9 in)	outside hitter
23	(Poland) Jordan Zaleszczyk	23 April 2002	2.03 m (6 ft 8 in)	middle blocker
Head coach:		(Croatia) Igor Juričić		

ZAKSA Kędzierzyn-Koźle
No.	Name	Date of birth	Height	Position
1	(Bulgaria) Denis Karyagin	28 September 2002	2.02 m (6 ft 8 in)	outside hitter
2	(Poland) Łukasz Kaczmarek	29 June 1994	2.04 m (6 ft 8 in)	opposite
4	(Poland) Przemysław Stępień	7 February 1994	1.85 m (6 ft 1 in)	setter
5	(Poland) Marcin Janusz	31 July 1994	1.95 m (6 ft 5 in)	setter
7	(Netherlands) Twan Wiltenburg	20 January 1997	2.04 m (6 ft 8 in)	middle blocker
8	(Poland) Adrian Staszewski	31 May 1990	1.98 m (6 ft 6 in)	outside hitter
9	(Poland) Bartłomiej Kluth	20 December 1992	2.10 m (6 ft 11 in)	opposite
10	(Poland) Bartosz Bednorz	25 July 1994	2.01 m (6 ft 7 in)	outside hitter
11	(Poland) Aleksander Śliwka	24 May 1995	1.97 m (6 ft 6 in)	outside hitter
15	(United States) David Smith	15 May 1985	2.01 m (6 ft 7 in)	middle blocker
16	(Poland) Tomasz Kalembka	30 June 1991	2.05 m (6 ft 9 in)	middle blocker
19	(Ukraine) Dmytro Pashytskyy	29 November 1987	2.05 m (6 ft 9 in)	middle blocker
21	(Poland) Wojciech Żaliński	8 January 1988	1.96 m (6 ft 5 in)	outside hitter
22	(United States) Erik Shoji	24 August 1989	1.83 m (6 ft 0 in)	libero
71	(Poland) Korneliusz Banach	25 January 1994	1.84 m (6 ft 0 in)	libero
99	(Poland) Norbert Huber	14 August 1998	2.07 m (6 ft 9 in)	middle blocker
Head coach:		(Finland) Tuomas Sammelvuo		

== See also ==
- 2022–23 CEV Champions League
- 2022–23 CEV Cup
