= Kwolek =

Kwolek is a Polish surname. Notable people with the surname include:

- Bartosz Kwolek (born 1997), Polish volleyball player
- Stephanie Kwolek (1923–2014), American chemist
