= 2025 FIVB Volleyball Men's Club World Championship =

International volleyball men's club competition

Tournament details
- Host country: Brazil
- City: Belém
- Dates: 16–21 December
- Teams: 8 (from 4 confederations)
- Venue: 1 (in 1 host city)

Final positions
- Champions: (Italy) Sir Sicoma Monini Perugia (3rd title)
- Runners-up: (Japan) Osaka Bluteon
- Third place: (Poland) Aluron CMC Warta Zawiercie
- Fourth place: (Brazil) Vôlei Renata

Tournament awards
- MVP: (Italy) Simone Giannelli
- Best Setter: (Italy) Simone Giannelli
- Best OH: (Cuba) Miguel Ángel López; (United States) Aaron Russell
- Best MB: (Argentina) Agustín Loser; (Argentina) Sebastián Solé
- Best OPP: (Tunisia) Wassim Ben Tara
- Best Libero: (Japan) Tomohiro Yamamoto

Tournament statistics
- Matches played: 14

The 2025 FIVB Volleyball Men's Club World Championship was the 20th edition of the competition. It was held in Belém, Brazil from 16 to 21 December 2025.

Sir Sicoma Monini Perugia won their third title after defeating Osaka Bluteon by 3–0 in the final.

== Qualification ==
Starting from 2024, the qualification for the Club World Championships will be as follows: two places per continent for Europe, Asia, and South America; one place for Africa; and finally, a club from the host nation will be granted a place. This change aims to ensure the fair representation from different continents and provides an opportunity for the host country to participate in the tournament.

Slots	Qualified as
1	Host club
2	CEV Champions League winners
2	CEV Champions League runners-up
2	CSV Club Championship winners
2	CSV Club Championship runners-up
2	AVC Club Championship winners
2	AVC Club Championship runners-up
1	CAVB Club Championship winners
Total: 8

=== Participating teams ===
Team (Confederation)	Qualified as
(Brazil) Vôlei Renata Campinas (CSV)	Hosts
(Brazil) Sada Cruzeiro (CSV)	2025 South American champions
(Brazil) Praia Clube (CSV)	2025 South American runners-up
(Italy) Sir Sicoma Monini Perugia (CEV)	2025 European champions
(Poland) Aluron CMC Warta Zawiercie (CEV)	2025 European runners-up
(Qatar) Al-Rayyan SC (AVC)	2025 Asian champions
(Japan) Osaka Bluteon (AVC)	2025 Asian runners-up
(Libya) Swehly SC (CAVB)	2025 African champions

== Venue ==
All matches
Belém, Brazil
Arena Guilherme Paraense
Capacity: 11,970
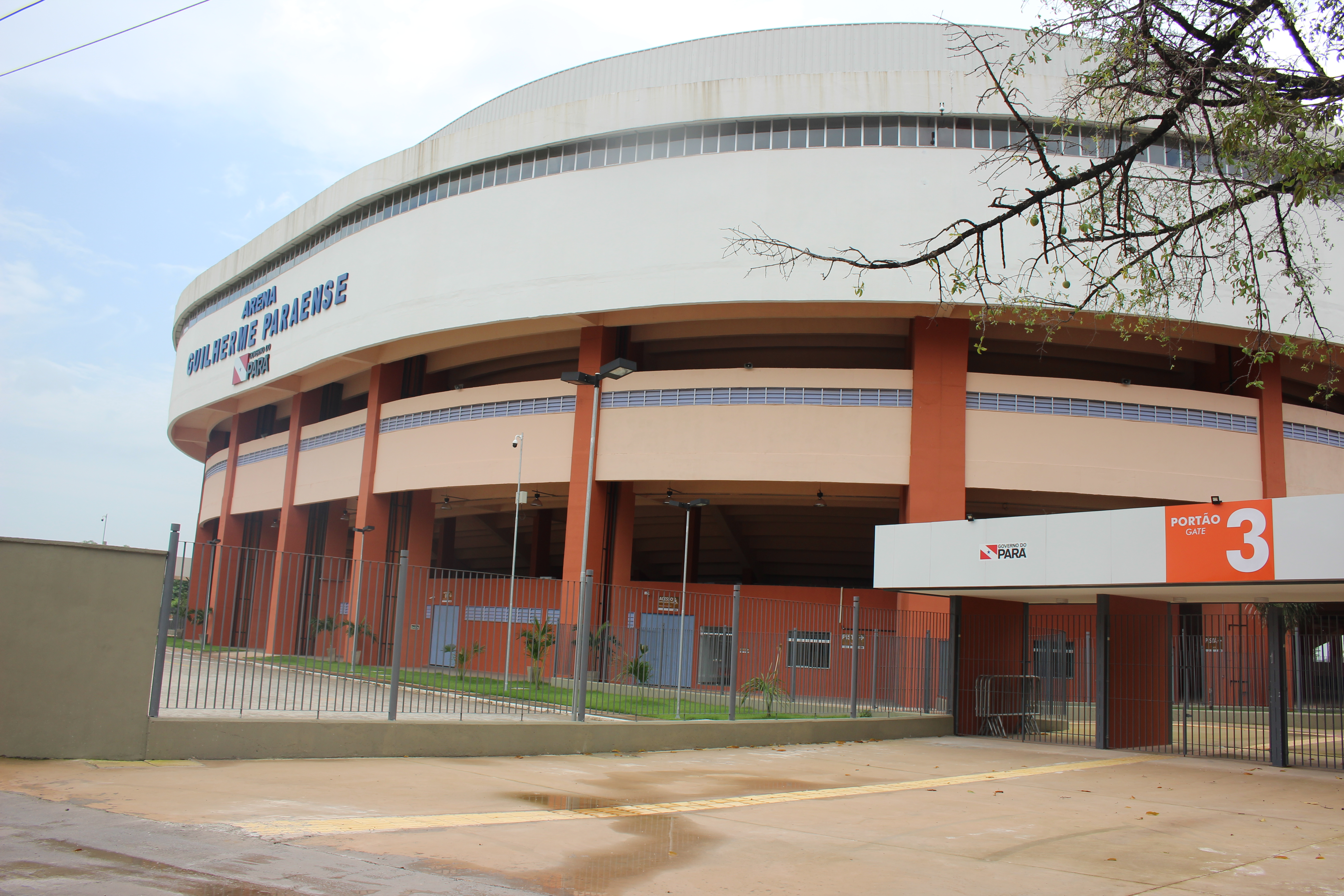

== Format ==
Eight participating teams are divided into two pools of four teams each in a round-robin match. The top two teams of each pool advance to the semifinals (Pool A winner vs. Pool B runner-up and the Pool B winner vs. Pool A runner-up). The winners of the two semifinals advance to the gold medal match and the losers to the bronze medal match.

== Pool standing procedure ==
1. Number of victories
2. Match points
3. Sets ratio
4. Points ratio
5. Result of the last match between the tied teams.

Match won 3–0 or 3–1: 3 match points for the winner and 0 match point for the loser.

Match won 3–2: 2 match points for the winner and 1 match point for the loser.

== Preliminary round ==
- All times are Brasília time (UTC−03:00).

=== Pool A ===
Pos	Team	Pld	W	L	Pts	SW	SL	SR	SPW	SPL	SPR	Qualification
1	(Poland) Aluron CMC Warta Zawiercie	3	3	0	8	9	2	4.500	261	199	1.312	Semifinals
2	(Brazil) Vôlei Renata Campinas	3	1	2	4	5	7	0.714	268	281	0.954	Semifinals
3	(Brazil) Praia Clube	3	1	2	3	4	6	0.667	206	231	0.892	
4	(Qatar) Al-Rayyan SC	3	1	2	3	3	6	0.500	193	217	0.889	

Source: FIVB

Date	Time		Score		Set 1	Set 2	Set 3	Set 4	Set 5	Total	Report
16 Dec	17:00	Al-Rayyan SC (Qatar)	0–3	(Brazil) Praia Clube	17–25	21–25	21–25			59–75	P2 Report
16 Dec	20:30	Vôlei Renata Campinas (Brazil)	2–3	(Poland) Aluron CMC Warta Zawiercie	19–25	27–25	19–25	25–20	14–16	104–111	P2 Report
17 Dec	17:00	Al-Rayyan SC (Qatar)	0–3	(Poland) Aluron CMC Warta Zawiercie	20–25	19–25	14–25			53–75	P2 Report
17 Dec	20:30	Vôlei Renata Campinas (Brazil)	3–1	(Brazil) Praia Clube	25–22	25–19	22–25	25–23		97–89	P2 Report
18 Dec	17:00	Praia Clube (Brazil)	0–3	(Poland) Aluron CMC Warta Zawiercie	19–25	9–25	14–25			42–75	P2 Report
18 Dec	20:30	Vôlei Renata Campinas (Brazil)	0–3	(Qatar) Al-Rayyan SC	18–25	29–31	20–25			67–81	P2 Report

=== Pool B ===
Pos	Team	Pld	W	L	Pts	SW	SL	SR	SPW	SPL	SPR	Qualification
1	(Italy) Sir Sicoma Monini Perugia	3	3	0	8	9	2	4.500	269	214	1.257	Semifinals
2	(Japan) Osaka Bluteon	3	2	1	7	8	3	2.667	259	231	1.121	Semifinals
3	(Brazil) Sada Cruzeiro	3	1	2	3	3	6	0.500	184	198	0.929	
4	(Libya) Swehly SC	3	0	3	0	0	9	0.000	156	225	0.693	

Source: FIVB

Date	Time		Score		Set 1	Set 2	Set 3	Set 4	Set 5	Total	Report
16 Dec	10:00	Sada Cruzeiro (Brazil)	0–3	(Japan) Osaka Bluteon	14–25	18–25	14–25			46–75	P2 Report
16 Dec	13:30	Sir Sicoma Monini Perugia (Italy)	3–0	(Libya) Swehly SC	25–10	25–14	25–18			75–42	P2 Report
17 Dec	10:00	Sada Cruzeiro (Brazil)	3–0	(Libya) Swehly SC	25–16	25–11	25–21			75–48	P2 Report
17 Dec	13:30	Sir Sicoma Monini Perugia (Italy)	3–2	(Japan) Osaka Bluteon	23–25	25–16	25–22	23–25	23–21	119–109	P2 Report
18 Dec	10:00	Sada Cruzeiro (Brazil)	0–3	(Italy) Sir Sicoma Monini Perugia	19–25	23–25	21–25			63–75	P2 Report
18 Dec	13:30	Swehly SC (Libya)	0–3	(Japan) Osaka Bluteon	22–25	23–25	21–25			66–75	P2 Report

== Final round ==
- All times are Brasília time (UTC−03:00).

Semi-finals
20 December
(Poland) Warta Zawiercie	0
(Japan) Osaka Bluteon	3
20 December
(Italy) Sir Sicoma Perugia	3
(Brazil) Vôlei Renata	0

Final
21 December
(Japan) Osaka Bluteon	0
(Italy) Sir Sicoma Perugia	3
Third place match
21 December
(Poland) Warta Zawiercie	3
(Brazil) Vôlei Renata	0

=== Semi-finals ===
Date	Time		Score		Set 1	Set 2	Set 3	Set 4	Set 5	Total	Report
20 Dec	15:00	Aluron CMC Warta Zawiercie (Poland)	0–3	(Japan) Osaka Bluteon	17–25	23–25	19–25			59–75	P2 Report
20 Dec	18:30	Sir Sicoma Monini Perugia (Italy)	3–0	(Brazil) Vôlei Renata Campinas	25–15	25–16	25–21			75–52	P2 Report

=== Third place match ===
Date	Time		Score		Set 1	Set 2	Set 3	Set 4	Set 5	Total	Report
21 Dec	15:00	Aluron CMC Warta Zawiercie (Poland)	3–0	(Brazil) Vôlei Renata Campinas	27–25	25–19	25–21			77–65	P2 Report

=== Final ===
Date	Time		Score		Set 1	Set 2	Set 3	Set 4	Set 5	Total	Report
21 Dec	18:30	Osaka Bluteon (Japan)	0–3	(Italy) Sir Sicoma Monini Perugia	20–25	21–25	27–29			68–79	P2 Report

== Final standing ==
Rank	Team
1st place, gold medalist(s)	(Italy) Sir Sicoma Monini Perugia
2nd place, silver medalist(s)	(Japan) Osaka Bluteon
3rd place, bronze medalist(s)	(Poland) Aluron CMC Warta Zawiercie
4	(Brazil) Vôlei Renata Campinas
5	(Brazil) Praia Clube
6	(Brazil) Sada Cruzeiro
7	(Qatar) Al-Rayyan SC
8	(Libya) Swehly SC

Source: Men's CWC 2025 – Final Standings

2025 Club World champions
(Italy)
Sir Sicoma Monini Perugia
Third title

Team
Bryan Argilagos, Donovan Dzavoronok, Gabrijel Cvanciger, Simone Giannelli (c), Agustín Loser, Wassim Ben Tara, Sebastián Solé, Massimo Colaci, Yūki Ishikawa, Kamil Semeniuk, Oleh Plotnytskyi, Roberto Russo, Marco Gaggini, Federico Crosato
Coach
(Italy) Angelo Lorenzetti

== Awards ==
- Most valuable player
  (Italy) Simone Giannelli (Perugia)
- Best setter
  (Italy) Simone Giannelli (Perugia)
- Best outside spikers
  (Cuba) Miguel Ángel López (Osaka Bluteon)
  (United States) Aaron Russell (Warta Zawiercie)
- Best middle blockers
  (Argentina) Agustín Loser (Perugia)
  (Argentina) Sebastián Solé (Perugia)
- Best opposite spiker
  (Tunisia) Wassim Ben Tara (Perugia)
- Best libero
  (Japan) Tomohiro Yamamoto (Osaka Bluteon)

== See also ==
- 2025 FIVB Volleyball Women's Club World Championship
