= Pablo Guzmán =

Pablo Guzmán may refer to:

- Pablo Guzmán (footballer) (born 1970), better known as Pablo Gómez, Spanish retired footballer
- Pablo Guzmán (reporter) (1950–2023), American reporter
- Pablo Guzmán (volleyball, born 1988), Argentine volleyball player
- Pablo Guzmán Parés, Puerto Rican volleyball player, previously of Asswehly SC
- Pablo Guzmán (Venezuelan caudillo), participant in the Liberating Revolution 1901–1903
