= Warta Zawiercie (volleyball) =

Polish volleyball club

Aluron CMC Warta Zawiercie
- Full name: Klub Siatkarski Aluron CMC Warta Zawiercie Spółka Akcyjna
- Nickname: Jurajscy Rycerze (The Jurassic Knights)
- Founded: 1972; 54 years ago
- Ground: Hala OSiR II (Capacity: 1,500)
- Chairman: Kryspin Baran
- Manager: Michał Winiarski
- Captain: Mateusz Bieniek
- League: Tauron Liga
- 2025–26: Champions
- Website: Club home page

Uniforms
Home	Away

Warta Zawiercie, officially known for sponsorship reasons as Aluron CMC Warta Zawiercie, is a professional men's volleyball club based in Zawiercie in southern Poland.

The club was founded in 1972 and reestablished in 2011. Since the 2017–18 season, Warta Zawiercie has been playing in Tauron Liga, the highest level league of Polish volleyball.

== Honours ==
=== Domestic ===
- Polish Championship

Winners (1): 2025–26

- Polish Cup

Winners (1): 2023–24

- Polish SuperCup

Winners (1): 2024–25

=== International ===
- CEV Champions League

Silver (2): 2024–25, 2025–26

- FIVB Club World Championship

Bronze (1): 2025

== Team ==
As of 2026–27 season

No.	Name	Date of birth	Position
1	(United States) Michael Wright	18 June 2001 (age 25)	setter
2	(Poland) Bartosz Kwolek	17 July 1997 (age 29)	outside hitter
3	(United States) Aaron Russell	4 June 1993 (age 33)	outside hitter
5	(Poland) Miłosz Zniszczoł	2 July 1986 (age 40)	middle blocker
7	(Poland) Jakub Kochanowski	17 July 1997 (age 29)	middle blocker
9	(Poland) Bartłomiej Bołądź	28 September 1994 (age 32)	opposite
10	(Poland) Jakub Popiwczak	17 April 1996 (age 30)	libero
11	(Italy) Kamil Rychlicki	1 November 1996 (age 29)	opposite
12	(Poland) Adrian Markiewicz	12 April 2002 (age 24)	middle blocker
15	(Portugal) Miguel Tavares	2 March 1993 (age 33)	setter
20	(Poland) Mateusz Bieniek	5 April 1994 (age 32)	middle blocker
21	(Poland) Tomasz Fornal	31 August 1997 (age 29)	outside hitter
37	(Poland) Dawid Ogórek	30 July 1990 (age 36)	libero
99	(Poland) Patryk Łaba	30 July 1991 (age 35)	outside hitter
Head coach:		(Poland) Michał Winiarski	

== Season by season ==
Season	Tier	League	Pos.
2017–18	1	PlusLiga	9
2018–19	1	PlusLiga	4
2019–20	1	PlusLiga	10
2020–21	1	PlusLiga	8
2021–22	1	PlusLiga	3

Season	Tier	League	Pos.
2022–23	1	PlusLiga	4
2023–24	1	PlusLiga	2
2024–25	1	PlusLiga	2
2025–26	1	PlusLiga	1st place, gold medalist(s)

== Former names ==
Years	Name
1972–1980	MZKS Warta Zawiercie
1980–1991	MRKS Warta Zawiercie
1991–1993	MKS Warta Zawiercie
1993–1995	KS CTH Warta Zawiercie
2011–2014	KS Aluron Warta Zawiercie
2014–2019	KS Aluron Virtu Warta Zawiercie
2019–2020	KS Aluron Virtu CMC Zawiercie
2020–present	KS Aluron CMC Warta Zawiercie

== See also ==
- Warta Zawiercie players
- Warta Zawiercie coaches
