= Libyan Volleyball League =

The Libyan Volleyball League (Arabic: الدوري الليبي للكرة الطائرة) is the highest division of the Libyan volleyball league pyramid, organized by Libyan Volleyball Federation. The league began in 1966.

== Winners ==
The most successful Libyan clubs are Alahly Benghazi which won 11 titles, and Asswehly won 7 titles.
