= Jakub Kochanowski =

Polish volleyball player (born 1997)

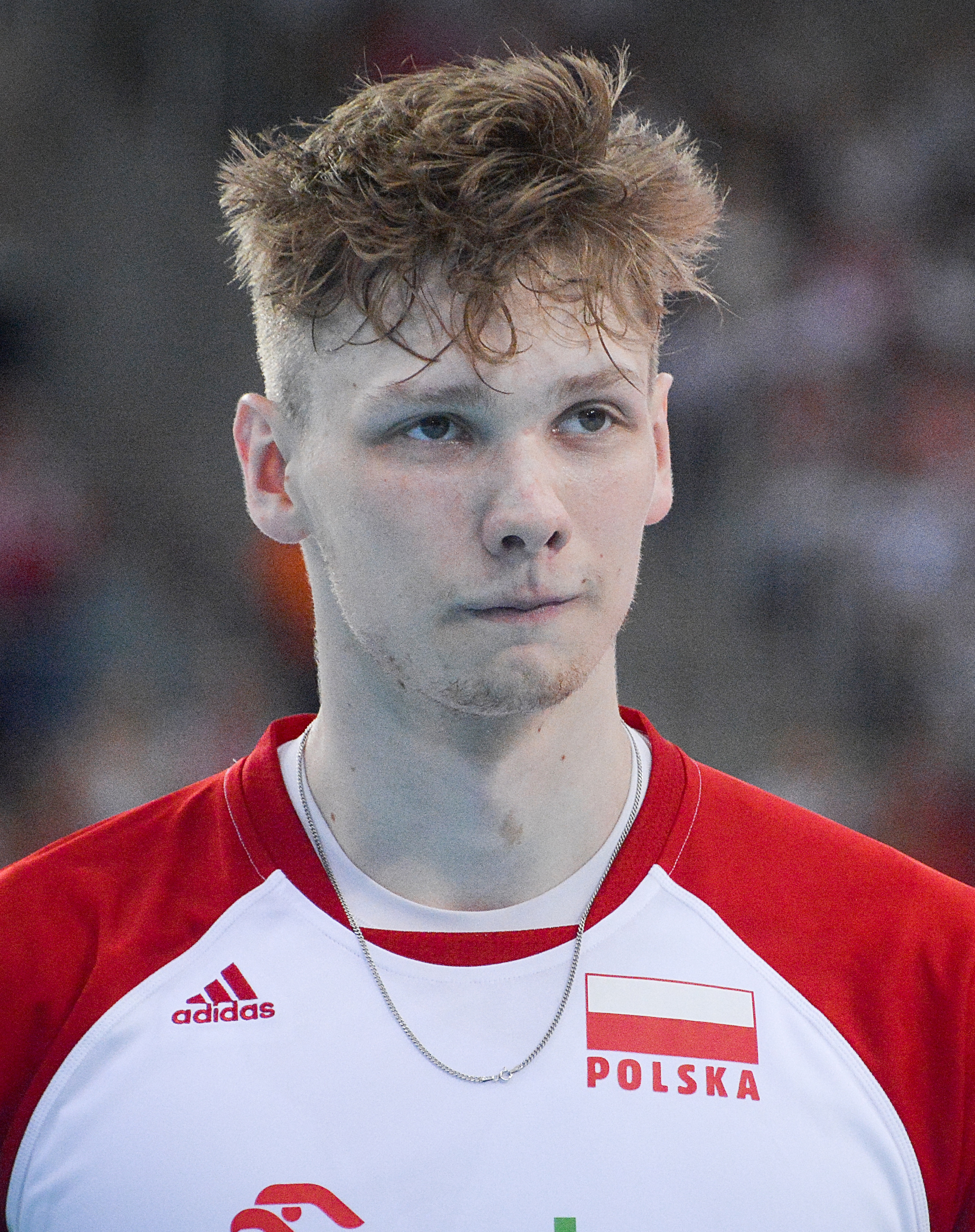
- Kochanowski in 2018

Personal information
- Born: 17 July 1997 (age 29); Giżycko, Poland
- Height: 1.99 m (6 ft 6 in)
- Weight: 85 kg (187 lb)
- Spike: 360 cm (142 in)
- Block: 335 cm (132 in)

Volleyball information
- Position: Middle blocker
- Current club: Warta Zawiercie
- Number: 7

Career
Years	Teams
2016–2018; 2018–2020; 2020–2021; 2021–2024; 2024–2026; 2026–	AZS Olsztyn; Skra Bełchatów; ZAKSA Kędzierzyn-Koźle; Asseco Resovia; Projekt Warsaw; Warta Zawiercie

National team
2018–	Poland
Honours
Men's volleyball
Representing Poland
Olympic Games
Silver medal – second place	2024 Paris	Team
FIVB World Championship
Gold medal – first place	2018 Bulgaria/Italy
Silver medal – second place	2022 Poland/Slovenia
Bronze medal – third place	2025 Philippines
FIVB World Cup
Silver medal – second place	2019 Japan
FIVB Nations League
Gold medal – first place	2023 Gdańsk
Gold medal – first place	2025 Ningbo
Silver medal – second place	2021 Rimini
Bronze medal – third place	2022 Bologna
Bronze medal – third place	2024 Łódź
CEV European Championship
Gold medal – first place	2023 Italy/Bulgaria/North Macedonia/Israel
Bronze medal – third place	2019 Belgium/France/Netherlands/Slovenia
Bronze medal – third place	2021 Poland/Czechia/Estonia/Finland

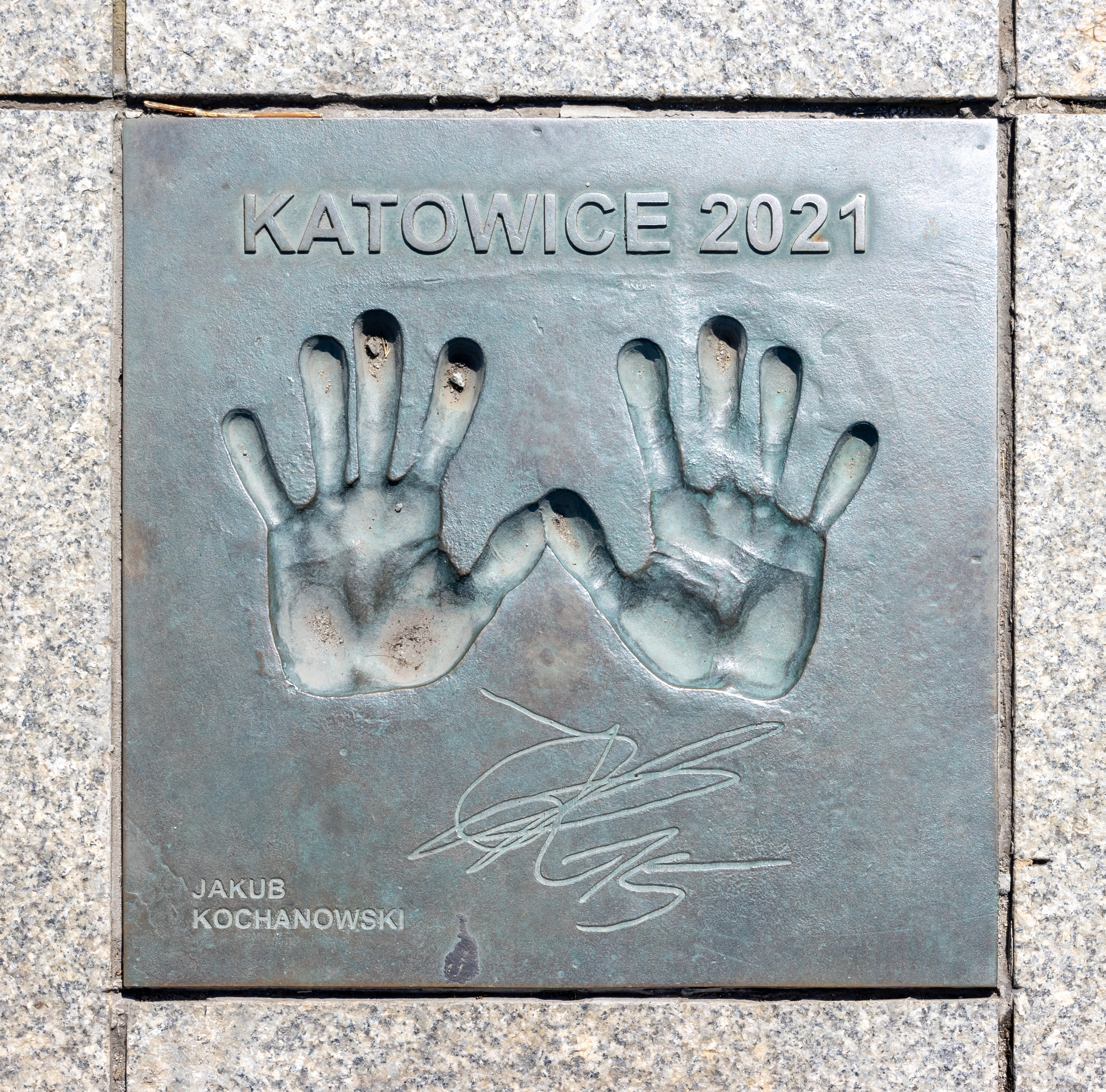
Hand prints and signature at the Avenue of Volleyball Stars, Katowice

Jakub Kochanowski (born 17 July 1997) is a Polish professional volleyball player who plays as a middle blocker for Aluron CMC Warta Zawiercie and the Poland national team. Kochanowski is a silver medallist in the 2024 Summer Olympics and is the 2018 World Champion and the 2021 Champions League winner with ZAKSA.

== Career ==
=== Club ===
On 10 May 2018, after a successful season in Indykpol AZS Olsztyn, and achieving 4th place in the league, he was announced as a new player of PGE Skra Bełchatów. In 2020, Kochanowski joined ZAKSA Kędzierzyn-Koźle.

=== National team ===
On 12 April 2015, the Poland national U19 team, including Kochanowski, won a title of the U19 European Champions. They beat Italy in the final (3–1). In the same year, he also took part in the European Youth Olympic Festival, and on 1 August 2015 achieved a gold medal after the final match with Bulgaria (3–0). On 23 August 2015, Poland achieved its first title of the U19 World Champion. In the final his team beat Argentina.

On 10 September 2016, he achieved a title of the U20 European Champion after winning 7 out of 7 matches at the tournament, and beating Ukraine in the final (3–1). On 2 July 2017, Poland, including Kochanowski, achieved a title of the U21 World Champion, after beating Cuba in the final (3–0). Kochanowski was awarded an individual award for the Most Valuable Player of the whole tournament. His national team won 47 matches in the row and never lost. The U21 World Champion title ended his time in youth national teams.

In April 2017, for the first time in his career, he was called up for the senior national team by the head coach of that time – Ferdinando De Giorgi. Kochanowski joined the team at the 2017 World League before the first week of competition because of Andrzej Wrona's injury. He debuted in the senior national team on 3 June 2017, in the match against Italy (3–1).

On 30 September 2018, Poland achieved its 3rd title of the World Champion. Poland beat Brazil in the final (3–0), and defended the title from 2014.

On 10 August 2024, he won the silver medal at the 2024 Summer Olympic Games in Paris.

== Honours ==
=== Club ===
- CEV Champions League
  - 2020–21 – with ZAKSA Kędzierzyn-Koźle
- CEV Cup
  - 2023–24 – with Asseco Resovia
- Domestic
  - 2018–19 Polish SuperCup, with PGE Skra Bełchatów
  - 2020–21 Polish SuperCup, with ZAKSA Kędzierzyn-Koźle
  - 2020–21 Polish Cup, with ZAKSA Kędzierzyn-Koźle

=== Youth national team ===
- 2014 CEV U20 European Championship
- 2015 CEV U19 European Championship
- 2015 European Youth Olympic Festival
- 2015 FIVB U19 World Championship
- 2016 CEV U20 European Championship
- 2017 FIVB U21 World Championship

=== Individual awards ===
- 2017: FIVB U21 World Championship – Most valuable player
- 2023: FIVB Nations League – Best middle blocker
- 2024: FIVB Nations League – Best middle blocker
- 2024: Olympic Games – Best middle blocker
- 2025: FIVB Nations League – Best middle blocker
- 2025: FIVB Nations League – Most valuable player
- 2025: FIVB World Championship – Best middle blocker

=== State awards ===
- 2018: Gold Cross of Merit
- 2024: Knight's Cross of Polonia Restituta

=== Statistics ===
- 2017–18 PlusLiga – Best blocker (100 blocks)
- 2022–23 PlusLiga – Best blocker (94 blocks)
