= Roland Gergye =

Hungarian volleyball player (born 1993)

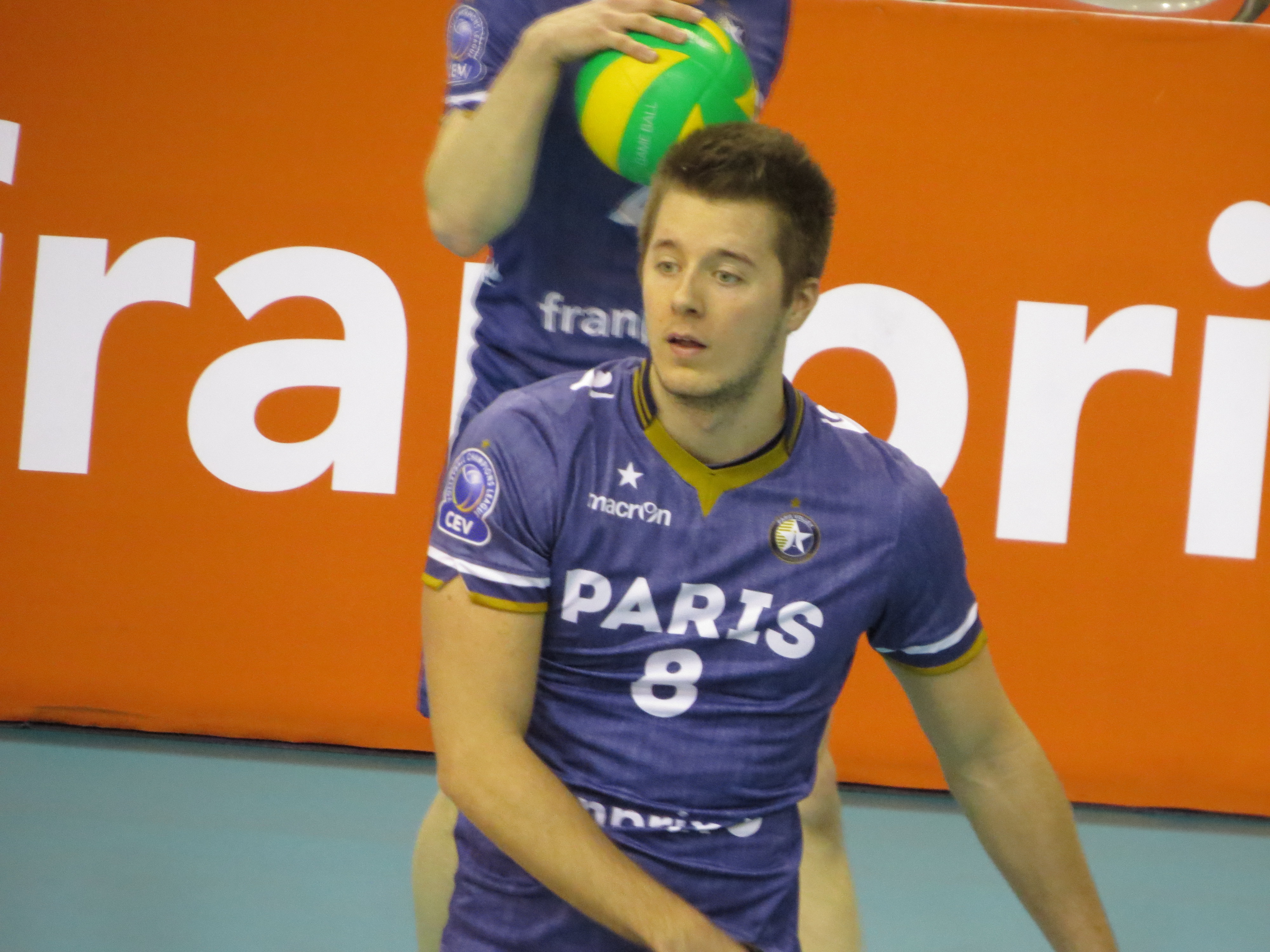

Personal information
- Born: 24 February 1993 (age 33); Kaposvár, Hungary
- Height: 1.98 m (6 ft 6 in)
- Weight: 95 kg (209 lb)
- Spike: 348 cm (137 in)
- Block: 330 cm (130 in)

Volleyball information
- Position: Outside hitter

Career
Years	Teams
2010–2013; 2013–2015; 2015–2016; 2016–2018; 2018–2019; 2019–2020; 2021–2022; 2022–2023	Volleyball Kaposvár; VfB Friedrichshafen; Beauvais Oise UC; Paris Volley; Galatasaray; Olympiacos; Merkur Maribor; BBTS Bielsko-Biała

National team
Hungary

Roland Gergye (born 24 February 1993) is a Hungarian professional volleyball player who plays as an outside hitter for the Hungary national team.

== Honours ==
=== Club ===
- CEV Cup
  - 2018–19 – with Galatasaray
- Domestic
  - 2010–11 Hungarian Cup, with Volleyball Kaposvár
  - 2010–11 Hungarian Championship, with Volleyball Kaposvár
  - 2011–12 Hungarian Cup, with Volleyball Kaposvár
  - 2011–12 Hungarian Championship, with Volleyball Kaposvár
  - 2012–13 Hungarian Cup, with Volleyball Kaposvár
  - 2012–13 Hungarian Championship, with Volleyball Kaposvár
  - 2013–14 German Cup, with VfB Friedrichshafen
  - 2014–15 German Cup, with VfB Friedrichshafen
  - 2014–15 German Championship, with VfB Friedrichshafen
  - 2019–20 Greek Championship, with Olympiacos
