= Asswehly SC (volleyball) =

Libyan volleyball club

Asswehly SC Volleyball
- Full name: Asswehly Sports Club
- Short name: Asswehly Volleyball
- Founded: 11 May 1944; 81 years ago
- Ground: Misurata Sports Hall (Capacity: 2500)
- Chairman: (Libya) Mahmoud Sqoutri
- Manager: (Libya)
- Captain: (Libya) Ali Ehmaid
- League: Libyan Volleyball League
- 2016–17: 2nd

Uniforms
Home	Away

Asswehly SC Volleyball (Arabic: السويحلي للكرة الطائرة) is a Libyan men's volleyball club. The club has been based in Misurata since 1944. It is playing in the Libyan Volleyball League.

== Current squad ==
Number	Player	Position	Height (m)

- Head coach: (Serbia) Dragan Djordjevic
- Assistant coach:

== Honors ==
=== National Achievements ===
- Libyan Men's Volleyball League :

Winners ( 10 titles) :

1989–90, 1995–96, 1997-98, 2000–01, 2002–03, 2013–14, 2015-16, 2017–18, 2018-2019, 2021-2022

- Libyan Men's Volleyball Cup :

Winners ( 3 titles) :

2006–07, 2013–14, 2016-17

=== Regional Achievements ===
- Arab Clubs Championship :

Winners (? x titles) :
Runners-up (? x vice champions) :

=== International Achievements ===
- African Club Championship :

Winners (? x titles) :
Runners up (? x vice champions) :

- African Cup Winners' Cup :

Winners (? x titles) :
Runners up (? x vice champions) :

== Professional players ==
- (Morocco) Zouheir Elgraoui (2016-17)
- (Puerto Rico) Juan Gabriel Vazquez (2016-17)
- (Dominican Republic) Pedro Luis García (2016-17)
- (Puerto Rico) Pablo Guzmán Parés (2015-16)
- (Cameroon) Jean Patrice Ndaki Mboulet (2015-16)
- (Italy) Simone Spescha (2013-14)
- (Egypt) Ahmed Yousef Afifi (2013-14)
