= Bartosz Kwolek =

Polish volleyball player (born 1997)

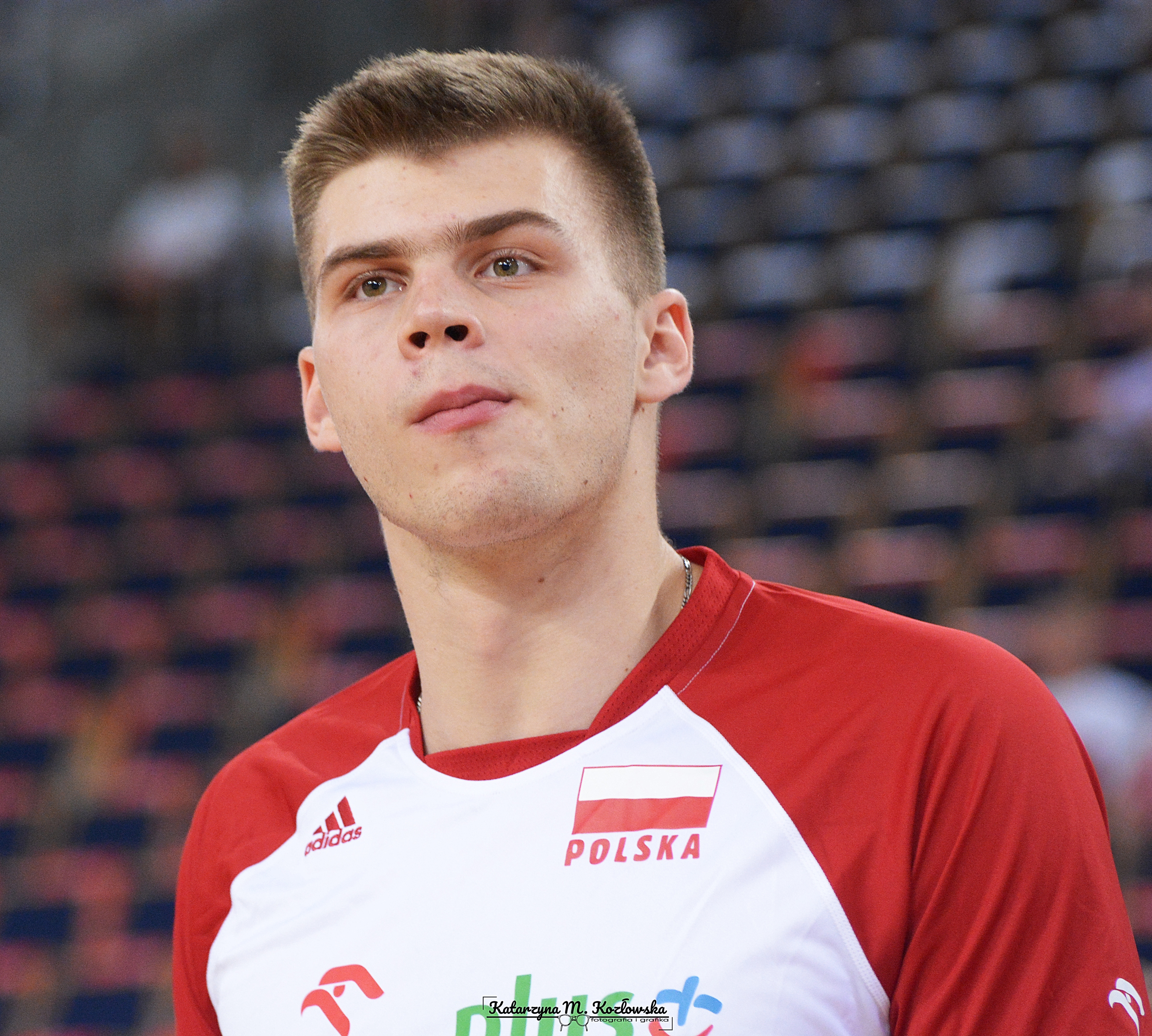
- Kwolek in 2018

Personal information
- Born: 17 July 1997 (age 29); Płock, Poland
- Height: 1.93 m (6 ft 4 in)
- Weight: 93 kg (205 lb)
- Spike: 343 cm (135 in)
- Block: 320 cm (126 in)

Volleyball information
- Position: Outside hitter
- Current club: Warta Zawiercie
- Number: 2

Career
Years	Teams
2016–2022; 2022–	Projekt Warsaw; Warta Zawiercie

National team
2018–	Poland
Honours
Men's volleyball
Representing Poland
FIVB World Championship
Gold medal – first place	2018 Bulgaria/Italy
Silver medal – second place	2022 Poland/Slovenia
FIVB World Cup
Silver medal – second place	2019 Japan
FIVB Nations League
Bronze medal – third place	2019 Chicago

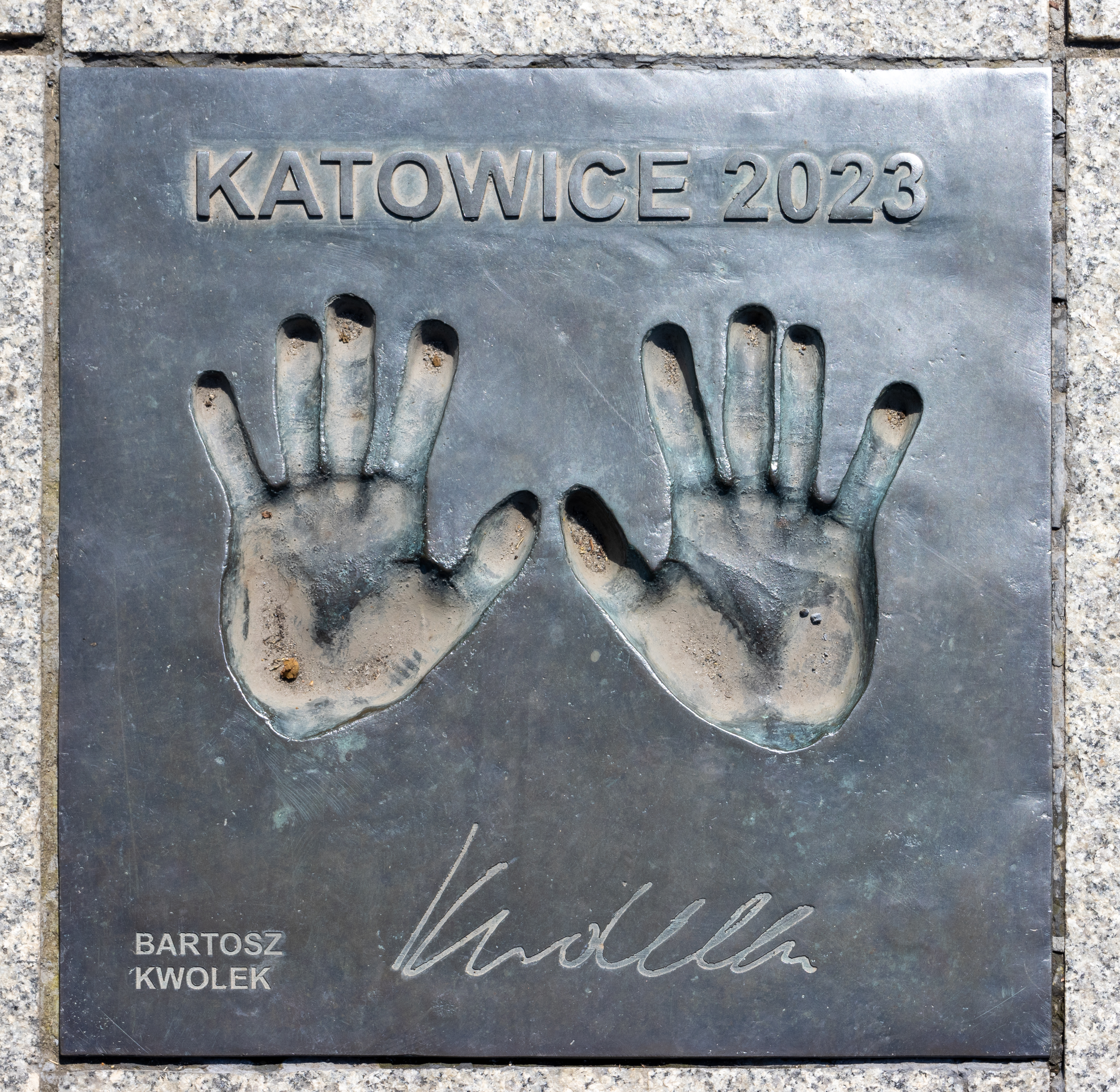
Hand prints and signature at the Avenue of Volleyball Stars, Katowice

Bartosz Kwolek (born 17 July 1997) is a Polish professional volleyball player who plays as an outside hitter for Aluron CMC Warta Zawiercie and the Poland national team.

== Career ==
=== Club ===
He made his debut in the Polish PlusLiga as a player of AZS Politechnika Warszawska in 2016.

=== National team ===
On 12 April 2015 the Polish national U19 team, including Kwolek, won a title of the CEV U19 European Champions. They beat Italy in the final (3–1). He was named the Most valuable player of the tournament. He took part in European Youth Olympic Festival with Polish national U19 team. On 1 August 2015 he achieved gold medal (final match with Bulgaria 3–0). On 23 August 2015 Poland achieved first title of U19 World Champion. In the final his team beat hosts – Argentina (3–2). On September 10, 2016 he achieved title of the 2016 CEV U20 European Champion after winning 7 of 7 matches in tournament and beating Ukraine in the final (3–1). Also, Kwolek received individual award for the Best Outside Hitter. On July 2, 2017 Poland U21, including Kwolek, achieved title of U21 World Champion 2017 after beating Cuba in the final (3–0). Kwolek was awarded an individual award for the Best outside spiker of the whole tournament. His national team won 47 matches in the row and never lost. The U21 World Champion title ended his time in youth national teams.

On 30 September 2018 Poland achieved its third title of the World Champion. Poland beat Brazil in the final 3–0 and defended the title from 2014.

== Honours ==
=== Club ===
- CEV Champions League
  - 2024–25 – with Aluron CMC Warta Zawiercie
  - 2025–26 – with Aluron CMC Warta Zawiercie
- Domestic
  - 2023–24 Polish Cup, with Aluron CMC Warta Zawiercie
  - 2024–25 Polish SuperCup, with Aluron CMC Warta Zawiercie
  - 2025–26 Polish Championship, with Aluron CMC Warta Zawiercie

=== Youth national team ===
- 2015 CEV U19 European Championship
- 2015 European Youth Olympic Festival
- 2015 FIVB U19 World Championship
- 2016 CEV U20 European Championship
- 2017 FIVB U21 World Championship

=== Individual awards ===
- 2015: CEV U19 European Championship – Most valuable player
- 2015: FIVB U19 World Championship – Most valuable player
- 2016: CEV U20 European Championship – Best outside spiker
- 2017: FIVB U21 World Championship – Best outside spiker

=== State awards ===
- 2018: Gold Cross of Merit
