= Urpo Sivula =

Finnish volleyball player (born 1988)

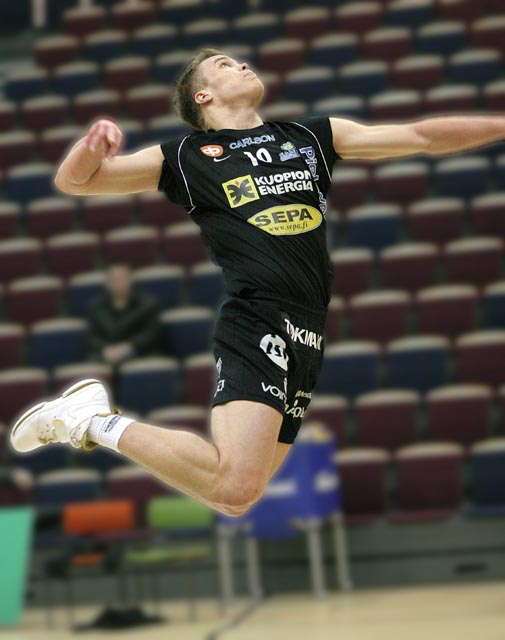

Personal information
- Full name: Urpo Sivula
- Born: 15 March 1988 (age 38); Kuru, Finland
- Height: 1.95 m (6 ft 5 in)

Volleyball information
- Position: Outside hitter
- Current club: Gabeca Pallavolo Spa
- Number: 10

Career
Years	Teams
2004–2006; 2006–2009; 2009; 2009–present	Kuortaneen Urheiluopisto; Pielaveden Sampo; Galatasaray; Gabeca Pallavolo Spa

National team
2006–present	Finland

Urpo Sivula (born 15 March 1988) is a Finnish professional volleyball player. During the 2008 season he played in the Finnish Volleyball league team Pielaveden Sampo. Sivula plays as a wing-spiker.

== Junior years ==
Sivula started his career with his friends at seven years old. His first team was Kurun Ryhti, from Kuru. His talent was soon recognized and Sivula started to play in Virtain Veikot, where he won two Finnish Junior Championships.

When Sivula turned sixteen he moved to Kuortane. There he started study and training with the best junior players in Finland. For two years he lived in Kuortane and played third highest level in Finland during the 2004–2005 season, and second highest level in Finland during the 2005–2006 season. He became Finland's junior team captain in 2004, and also he played on the Finland national team with boys two years older than he. There he became friends with Mikko and Matti Oivanen, Simo-Pekka Olli and Konstantin Shumov.

== National team ==
Before Sivula played a game in the Finnish league he got a call from head coach of the Finnish men's national team, Mauro Berruto. Berruto wanted Sivula to join his team immediately. Sivula started to play in the men's national team at the age of 18. His first national team game in Finland caused a sensation. Sivula entered the court during a crucial point in the game, hit two points, and Finland won the first game ever in the volleyball world league. The whole summer Sivula played in the national team, and helped them earn a place in the European Championships.

=== Sensation in Moscow ===
In the European Championships 2007 Sivula and the Finland national team played amazing volleyball. The team beat World Championships silver medalists Poland, and World Championships bronze medalists Bulgaria. Finland lost only two games, and both in medal games. Finland played against Spain to the final, but it lost to Spain. Sivula played in World League 2008 with Finland. He was one of the leading players on the team that whole summer. He made his breakthrough in the Finland national team.

== Finland league ==
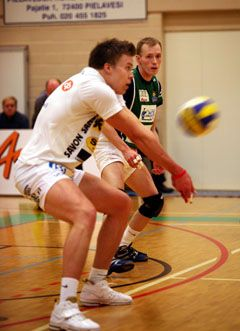
Sivula receiving (2008)

After Sivula played on the national team during summer 2006, all the teams at Finland's highest level wanted Sivula. Finally, Sivula signed a contract with Pielaveden Sampo. The contract lasted two years, with a third optional year. The first season in the league Sivula was recognized as one of the best players in the league. He won with Sampo Finland Cup-Champion, and played in the CEV Cup quarterfinal. In the Finland league Sampo lost its final division game against Rovaniemen Santasport. Finals were some of the best ever seen in the Finland league. After the season Sivula was chosen as the best newcomer in the league.

Sivula started his second league season in Finland with big expectations. The media expected that Sivula would be the ultimate discovery in the league. In the first game that season Sivula played amazing volleyball. The Finnish media described the game as the "Sivula show." In the international court Sivula also played well. Against the Italian A1-league team Roma Volley, Sivula was the best spiker of both teams on the court.

During the 2007–2008 season Sampo played in the Challenge Cup quarterfinal; there they had a narrow loss against Russian Superleague team Lokomotiv Ekaterinburg. Sampo won again in the Finland cup-championship, but in the league they lost again to Rovaniemen Santasport in finals. That was a big disappointment for Sivula and Sampo.

After the season Sivula received many prizes. Finland's biggest newspaper, Ilta-Sanomat recognized him as the best player in the league. Finland's favourite volleyball site, hotsport.info, also chose Sivula as the best player in the league, and in the all-stars team. Also Sport Channel chose him for the All-Star team. During the 2008–09 season Sivula started in Pielaveden Sampo. He led his team to the Finland Cup-finals. The final game was his last game in Finland. He was named the best player of the game. After the game he signed a contract with the Galatasaray volleyball club of Turkey.

Sivula changed Turkey league after his first season to Italian volleyball league. There his coach was Mauro Berruto, who coached also in Finnish volleyball national team.

== Awards ==
Club:

- Finnish league silver 2007, 2008
- Finnish cup 2006, 2007, 2008
- Fourth place in Men's European Championships 2007

Personal:

- Ilta-Sanomat chose best player in Finland league 2008
- Sport Channel All-Stars team 2008
- Youth Player of the Year: 2006, 2007
- Best newcomer in Finland league 2007
- Third best server in Finland league 2007
