= 2011–12 CEV Challenge Cup =

- League: CEV Challenge Cup
- Sport: Volleyball
- Duration: 22 October 2011 – 31 March 2012

Finals
- Champions: (Poland) Tytan AZS Częstochowa
- Runners-up: (Poland) AZS Politechnika Warszawska
- Finals MVP: (Poland) Dawid Murek

CEV Challenge Cup seasons
- ← 2010–11 2012–13 →

The 2011–12 CEV Challenge Cup was the 32nd edition of the European Challenge Cup volleyball club tournament, the former CEV Cup.

The final of 2011–12 CEV Challenge Cup became Polish derby, because of Tytan AZS Częstochowa and AZS Politechnika Warszawska meetings. Tytan AZS Częstochowa won the first match and lost the next one after tie-break, but their victory was decided by the golden set. The Most Valuable Player of final matches was chosen captain of winner team, Polish player Dawid Murek.

== Participating teams ==
Country	Number of teams	Teams
Albania	1	VC Teuta Durrës
Austria	3	hotVolleys Vienna, Hypo No Amstetten, SK Posojilnica Aich/Dob
Belarus	3	Metallurg Zhlobin, Kommunalnik Grodno, Stroitel Minsk
Belgium	1	Prefaxis Menen
Bosnia and Herzegovina	2	MOK Brčko-Jedinstvo, OK Kakanj
Bulgaria	1	CVC Gabrovo
Croatia	2	OK Mladost Marina Kaštela, Mladost Zagreb
Cyprus	3	Pokka A.E. Karava, Nea Salamis Famagusta, Anorthosis Famagusta
Czech Republic	1	VK Dukla Liberec
Estonia	1	Selver Tallinn
Finland	4	Sampo Pielavesi, Etta Oulu, Isku Volley Tampere, Lakkapää Rovaniemi
France	1	Rennes Volley 35,
Germany	1	Evivo Düren
Greece	1	Olympiacos Piraeus
Israel	1	Hapoel Kfar Saba, Maccabi Tel Aviv
Italy	1	Casa Modena
Luxembourg	1	VC Strassen
Netherlands	2	Langhenkel Doetinchem, Abiant Groningen
Norway	1	Nyborg Bergen
Poland	2	AZS Politechnika Warszawska, Tytan AZS Częstochowa
Portugal	1	Fonte Bastardo Açores
Romania	4	Universitatea Cluj, Tomis Constanța, Dinamo București, Stiinta Explorari Baia Mare
Russia	1	Dinamo Krasnodar
Spain	1	Unicaja Almería
Serbia	2	Radnički Kragujevac, Vojvodina NS Seme Novi Sad
Slovakia	1	Chemes Humenné
Slovenia	1	Calcit Kamnik
Switzerland	3	Volley Amriswil, Chênois Genève, Lausanne UC
Turkey	1	Galatasaray Yurtici Istanbul
Ukraine	1	Lokomotyv Kharkiv

== Qualification phase ==
=== 1st round ===
- 1st leg 22–23 October 2011
- 2nd leg 29–30 October 2011

Team 1	Agg.	Team 2	1st leg	2nd leg
Metallurg Zhlobin (Belarus)	6–2	(Norway) Nyborg Bergen	3–1	3–1
Kommunalnik Grodno (Belarus)	6–2	(Romania) Universitatea Cluj	3–0	3–2

=== 2nd round ===
- 1st leg 13–15 December 2011
- 2nd leg 20–22 December 2011

Team 1	Agg.	Team 2	1st leg	2nd leg	Golden Set
hotVolleys Vienna (Austria)	0–6	(Cyprus) Pokka A.E. Karava	0–3	0–3	
Langhenkel Doetinchem (Netherlands)	5–4	(Finland) Sampo Pielavesi	2–3	3–1	15–12
Chemes Humenné (Slovakia)	1–6	(France) Rennes Volley 35	1–3	0–3	
Metallurg Zhlobin (Belarus)	3–6	(Poland) AZS Politechnika Warszawska	1–3	2–3	
Fonte Bastardo Açores (Portugal)	6–2	(Germany) Evivo Düren	3–0	3–2	
Casa Modena (Italy)	3–3	(Luxembourg) VC Strassen	3–0	0–3	5–15
VK Dukla Liberec (Czech Republic)	5–5	(Switzerland) Volley Amriswil	2–3	3–2	10–15
Radnički Kragujevac (Serbia)	4–4	(Belgium) Prefaxis Menen	3–1	1–3	9–15
Galatasaray Yurtici Istanbul (Turkey)	6–0	(Albania) VC Teuta Durrës	3–0	3–0	
Nea Salamis Famagusta (Cyprus)	6–2	(Bulgaria) CVC Gabrovo	3–0	3–2	
Dinamo Krasnodar (Russia)	6–1	(Belarus) Kommunalnik Grodno	3–1	3–0	
Olympiacos Piraeus (Greece)	6–1	(Israel) Hapoel Kfar Saba	3–0	3–1	
Hypo No Amstetten (Austria)	6–3	(Serbia) Vojvodina NS Seme Novi Sad	3–1	3–2	
MOK Brčko-Jedinstvo (Bosnia and Herzegovina)	1–6	(Romania) Tomis Constanța	1–3	0–3	
Chênois Genève (Switzerland)	3–6	(Netherlands) Abiant Groningen	1–3	2–3	
Etta Oulu (Finland)	2–6	(Belarus) Stroitel Minsk	1–3	1–3	

== Main phase ==
=== 16th finals ===
- 1st leg 10–12 January 2012
- 2nd leg 17–19 January 2012

Team 1	Agg.	Team 2	1st leg	2nd leg	Golden Set
Dinamo București (Romania)	2–6	(Russia) Dinamo Krasnodar	0–3	2–3	
OK Mladost Marina Kaštela (Croatia)	0–6	(Poland) AZS Politechnika Warszawska	0–3	0–3	
Lokomotyv Kharkiv (Ukraine)	6–0	(Switzerland) Volley Amriswil	3–0	3–0	
OK Kakanj (Bosnia and Herzegovina)	2–6	(Turkey) Galatasaray Yurtici Istanbul	2–3	0–3	
Stiinta Explorari Baia Mare (Romania)	1–6	(Romania) Tomis Constanța	1–3	0–3	
Anorthosis Famagusta (Cyprus)	1–6	(Cyprus) Nea Salamis Famagusta	1–3	0–3	
Maccabi Tel Aviv (Israel)	6–1	(Luxembourg) VC Strassen	3–0	3–1	
Olympiacos Piraeus (Greece)	6–0	(Finland) Isku Volley Tampere	3–0	3–0	
Rennes Volley 35 (France)	6–1	(Croatia) Mladost Zagreb	3–0	3–1	
Stroitel Minsk (Belarus)	6–2	(Austria) SK Posojilnica Aich/Dob	3–2	3–0	
Unicaja Almería (Spain)	6–2	(Netherlands) Abiant Groningen	3–0	3–2	
Fonte Bastardo Açores (Portugal)	1–6	(Poland) Tytan AZS Częstochowa	0–3	1–3	
Langhenkel Doetinchem (Netherlands)	5–3	(Estonia) Selver Tallinn	2–3	3–0	13–15
Hypo No Amstetten (Austria)	4–6	(Switzerland) Lausanne UC	2–3	2–3	
Calcit Kamnik (Slovenia)	1–6	(Belgium) Prefaxis Menen	1–3	0–3	
Lakkapää Rovaniemi (Finland)	3–6	(Cyprus) Pokka A.E. Karava	1–3	2–3	

=== 8th finals ===
- 1st leg 31 January – 2 February 2012
- 2nd leg 7–9 February 2012

Team 1	Agg.	Team 2	1st leg	2nd leg	Golden Set
Dinamo Krasnodar (Russia)	4–3	(Poland) AZS Politechnika Warszawska	3–0	1–3	8–15
Lokomotyv Kharkiv (Ukraine)	6–3	(Turkey) Galatasaray Yurtici Istanbul	3–1	3–2	
Nea Salamis Famagusta (Cyprus)	0–3	(Romania) Tomis Constanța	0–3	withdrew	
Olympiacos Piraeus (Greece)	4–4	(Israel) Maccabi Tel Aviv	3–1	1–3	12–15
Rennes Volley 35 (France)	5–4	(Belarus) Stroitel Minsk	3–1	2–3	15–13
Tytan AZS Częstochowa (Poland)	5–4	(Spain) Unicaja Almería	3–1	2–3	16–14
Selver Tallinn (Estonia)	5–5	(Switzerland) Lausanne UC	2–3	3–2	12–15
Prefaxis Menen (Belgium)	6–0	(Cyprus) Pokka A.E. Karava	3–0	3–0	

=== 4th finals ===
- 1st leg 21–23 February 2012
- 2nd leg 28 February – 1 March 2012

Team 1	Agg.	Team 2	1st leg	2nd leg	Golden Set
AZS Politechnika Warszawska (Poland)	6–3	(Ukraine) Lokomotyv Kharkiv	3–1	3–2	
Tomis Constanța (Romania)	6–1	(Israel) Maccabi Tel Aviv	3–0	3–1	
Tytan AZS Częstochowa (Poland)	4–4	(France) Rennes Volley 35	3–1	1–3	15–11
Lausanne UC (Switzerland)	0–6	(Belgium) Prefaxis Menen	0–3	0–3	

== Final phase ==
=== Semi finals ===
Team 1	Agg.	Team 2	1st leg	2nd leg
Tomis Constanța (Romania)	3–6	(Poland) AZS Politechnika Warszawska	2–3	1–3
Tytan AZS Częstochowa (Poland)	6–2	(Belgium) Prefaxis Menen	3–1	3–1

==== First leg ====
Date	Time		Score		Set 1	Set 2	Set 3	Set 4	Set 5	Total	Report
14 Mar	17:00	Tomis Constanța (Romania)	2–3	(Poland) AZS Politechnika Warszawska	20–25	25–21	25–23	18–25	11–15	99–109	Report
14 Mar	19:00	Tytan AZS Częstochowa (Poland)	3–1	(Belgium) Prefaxis Menen	25–18	20–25	25–15	25–23		95–81	Report

==== Second leg ====
Date	Time		Score		Set 1	Set 2	Set 3	Set 4	Set 5	Total	Report
17 Mar	18:00	AZS Politechnika Warszawska (Poland)	3–1	(Romania) Tomis Constanța	25–22	21–25	25–22	25–20		96–89	Report
17 Mar	20:30	Prefaxis Menen (Belgium)	1–3	(Poland) Tytan AZS Częstochowa	25–20	22–25	19–25	24–26		90–96	Report

=== Final ===
==== First leg ====
Date	Time		Score		Set 1	Set 2	Set 3	Set 4	Set 5	Total	Report
27 Mar	20:30	AZS Politechnika Warszawska (Poland)	1–3	(Poland) Tytan AZS Częstochowa	24–26	25–23	25–27	20–25		94–101	Report

==== Second leg ====
Date	Time		Score		Set 1	Set 2	Set 3	Set 4	Set 5	Total	Report
31 Mar	14:30	Tytan AZS Częstochowa (Poland)	2–3	(Poland) AZS Politechnika Warszawska	25–14	25–22	22–25	23–25	11–15	106–101	Report
Golden set		Tytan AZS Częstochowa (Poland)	18–16	(Poland) AZS Politechnika Warszawska							

== Final standing ==
Rank	Team
1st place, gold medalist(s)	(Poland) Tytan AZS Częstochowa
2nd place, silver medalist(s)	(Poland) AZS Politechnika Warszawska
Semifinalists	(Belgium) Prefaxis Menen
Semifinalists	(Romania) Tomis Constanța

2012 Men's CEV Challenge Cup winner
(Poland)
Tytan AZS Częstochowa
1st title

Krzysztof Gierczyński, Michał Kamiński, Michał Kaczyński, Dawid Murek, Fabian Drzyzga, Bartosz Janeczek, Łukasz Wiśniewski, Adrian Hunek, Wojciech Sobala, Miłosz Hebda, Jakub Oczko, Adrian Stańczak
Head coach
Marek Kardoš
