= 2007–08 CEV Cup =

2007–08 Men's CEV Cup
- League: CEV Cup
- Sport: Volleyball
- Duration: 20 October 2007 – 24 March 2008

Finals
- Champions: (Italy) Roma Volley
- Runners-up: (Belgium) Noliko Maaseik
- Finals MVP: (Italy) Manuel Coscione (ROM)

CEV Cup seasons
- ← CEV Top Teams Cup 2008–09 →

The 2007–08 CEV Cup was the 36th edition of the European CEV Cup volleyball club tournament, the former Top Teams Cup.

Roma Volley beat Noliko Maaseik in the finale. Italian Manuel Coscione was awarded a title of the Most Valuable Player.

== Participating teams ==
Country	Number of teams	Teams
Austria	1	Hypo Tirol Innsbruck
Belgium	2 +1	VC Menen, Sartorius Asse Lennik, Noliko Maaseik
Croatia	1	Mladost Zagreb
Czech Republic	1	VK Dukla Liberec
Finland	2	Perungan Pojat Rovaniemi, Pielaveden Sampo Pielavesi
France	2	Stade Poitevin Poitiers, TOAC TUC Toulouse
Germany	1	Evivo Düren
Greece	1 +2	PAOK Thessaloniki, Iraklis Thessaloniki, Olympiacos Piraeus
Hungary	2	Kometa Kaposvar, Phoenix Mecano Kecskemet
Italy	1	Roma Volley
Macedonia	2	Rabotnicki Fersped Skopje, 11 Oktomvri 2005 Priler
Montenegro	1 +1	Budvanska Rivijera Budva, Budućnost Podgorica
Netherlands	1	Ortec Nesselande Rotterdam
Poland	2	AZS Olsztyn, Wkręt-met Domex AZS Częstochowa
Romania	2	Tomis Constanța, Dinamo Bucuresti
Russia	2	Iskra Odintsovo, Fakel Novy Urengoy
Spain	2	Arona Tenerife, Ciudad Medio Ambiente Soria
Serbia	1	Radnicki Kragujevac
Slovenia	2	OK Maribor, Marchiol Prvacina
Switzerland	2	Seat Näfels, TV Amriswil
Turkey	1	İstanbul Büyükşehir Belediyesi

== Reglament ==
When the two matches result in one win and one defeat for each team, the teams must play one extra set called GOLDEN SET. The Golden Set is to be played as a tie break set until 15 points. The team winning this GOLDEN SET will qualify for the next round regardless the results of the previous matches.

== Main phase ==
=== 16th Finals ===
The 16 winning teams from the 1/16 Finals will compete in the 1/8 Finals playing Home & Away matches. The losers of the 1/16 final matches qualify for the 3rd round in 2007–08 CEV Challenge Cup.

Team 1	Agg.	Team 2	1st leg	2nd leg	Golden Set
AZS Olsztyn (Poland)	5–4	(Belgium) Sartorius Asse Lennik	3–1	2–3	13–15
Dinamo Bucuresti (Romania)	3–4	(Czech Republic) VK Dukla Liberec	3–1	0–3	8–15
Ortec Nesselande Rotterdam (Netherlands)	0–6	(Russia) Fakel Novy Urengoy	0–3	0–3	
Ciudad Medio Ambiente Soria (Spain)	2–6	(Belgium) VC Menen	1–3	1–3	
Iskra Odintsovo (Russia)	6–0	(Slovenia) Marchiol Prvacina	3–0	3–0	
Wkręt-met D. AZS Częstochowa (Poland)	6–1	(Germany) Evivo Düren	3–1	3–0	
Perungan Pojat Rovaniemi (Finland)	4–6	(Romania) Tomis Constanța	2–3	2–3	
Mladost Zagreb (Croatia)	0–6	(Austria) Hypo Tirol Innsbruck	0–3	0–3	
Arona Tenerife (Spain)	6–1	(Hungary) Phoenix Mecano Kecskemet	3–0	3–1	
TV Amriswil (Switzerland)	1–6	(Serbia) Radnicki Kragujevac	1–3	0–3	
Budvanska Rivijera Budva (Montenegro)	6–1	(Slovenia) OK Maribor	3–1	3–0	
Kometa Kaposvar (Hungary)	6–3	(Greece) PAOK Thessaloniki	3–1	3–2	
Stade Poitevin Poitiers (France)	3–6	(France) TOAC TUC Toulouse	2–3	1–3	
11 Oktomvri 2005 Priler (North Macedonia)	0–6	(Switzerland) Seat Näfels	0–3	0–3	
İstanbul Büyükşehir Belediyesi (Turkey)	6–1	(North Macedonia) Rabotnicki Fersped Skopje	3–0	3–1	
Pielaveden Sampo Pielavesi (Finland)	3–6	(Italy) Roma Volley	1–3	2–3	

==== First leg ====
Date	Time		Score		Set 1	Set 2	Set 3	Set 4	Set 5	Total	Report
20 Oct	15:00	AZS Olsztyn (Poland)	3–1	(Belgium) Sartorius Asse Lennik	25–27	25–16	25–17	25–18		100–78	Report
20 Oct	18:00	Dinamo Bucuresti (Romania)	3–1	(Czech Republic) VK Dukla Liberec	25–17	25–18	19–25	25–23		94–83	Report
21 Oct	18:00	Ortec Nesselande Rotterdam (Netherlands)	0–3	(Russia) Fakel Novy Urengoy	22–25	19–25	22–25			63–75	Report
20 Oct	19:15	Ciudad Medio Ambiente Soria (Spain)	1–3	(Belgium) VC Menen	25–21	25–27	21–25	20–25		91–98	Report
27 Oct	18:00	Iskra Odintsovo (Russia)	3–0	(Slovenia) Marchiol Prvacina	25–12	25–16	25–16			75–44	Report
27 Oct	15:00	Wkręt-met AZS Częstochowa (Poland)	3–1	(Germany) Evivo Düren	25–22	25–17	23–25	25–15		98–79	Report
21 Oct	17:00	Perungan Pojat Rovaniemi (Finland)	2–3	(Romania) Tomis Constanța	16–25	25–15	22–25	25–22	13–15	101–102	Report
21 Oct	20:00	Mladost Zagreb (Croatia)	0–3	(Austria) Hypo Tirol Innsbruck	21–25	14–25	14–25			49–75	Report
20 Oct	18:30	Arona Tenerife (Spain)	3–0	(Hungary) Phoenix Mecano Kecskemet	25–21	25–14	25–21			75–56	Report
21 Oct	17:00	TV Amriswil (Switzerland)	1–3	(Serbia) Radnicki Kragujevac	15–25	21–25	25–21	21–25		82–96	Report
27 Oct	18:00	Budvanska Rivijera Budva (Montenegro)	3–0	(Slovenia) OK Maribor	25–20	25–15	20–21			70–56	Report
21 Oct	18:00	Kometa Kaposvar (Hungary)	3–1	(Greece) PAOK Thessaloniki	25–21	25–12	24–26	26–24		100–83	Report
27 Oct	20:00	Stade Poitevin Poitiers (France)	1–3	(France) TOAC TUC Toulouse	25–23	27–29	27–29	23–25		102–106	Report
27 Oct	17:30	11 Oktomvri 2005 Priler (North Macedonia)	0–3	(Switzerland) Seat Näfels	15–25	15–25	17–25			47–75	Report
20 Oct	18:00	İstanbul Büyükşehir Belediyesi (Turkey)	3–0	(North Macedonia) Rabotnicki Fersped Skopje	25–19	25–15	25–22			75–56	Report
21 Oct	16:00	Pielaveden Sampo Pielavesi (Finland)	1–3	(Italy) Roma Volley	25–19	22–25	23–25	22–25		92–94	Report

==== Second leg ====
Date	Time		Score		Set 1	Set 2	Set 3	Set 4	Set 5	Total	Report
27 Oct	20:30	Sartorius Asse Lennik (Belgium)	3–2	(Poland) AZS Olsztyn	25–19	17–25	25–20	17–25	18–16	102–105	Report
Golden set		Sartorius Asse Lennik (Belgium)	15–13	(Poland) AZS Olsztyn							
27 Oct	18:00	VK Dukla Liberec (Czech Republic)	3–0	(Romania) Dinamo Bucuresti	25–16	25–13	25–17			75–46	Report
Golden set		VK Dukla Liberec (Czech Republic)	15–8	(Romania) Dinamo Bucuresti							
27 Oct	18:00	Fakel Novy Urengoy (Russia)	3–0	(Netherlands) Ortec Nesselande Rotterdam	25–18	25–19	25–22			75–59	Report
27 Oct	20:00	VC Menen (Belgium)	3–1	(Spain) Ciudad Medio Ambiente Soria	25–17	21–25	25–20	25–21		96–83	Report
21 Oct	19:00	Marchiol Prvacina (Slovenia)	0–3	(Russia) Iskra Odintsovo	19–25	29–31	17–25			65–81	Report
20 Oct	19:30	Evivo Düren (Germany)	0–3	(Poland) Wkręt-met AZS Częstochowa	19–25	21–25	21–25			61–75	Report
27 Oct	17:00	Tomis Constanța (Romania)	3–2	(Finland) Perungan Pojat Rovaniemi	25–13	14–25	25–18	23–25	15–13	102–94	Report
26 Oct	20:15	Hypo Tirol Innsbruck (Austria)	3–0	(Croatia) Mladost Zagreb	25–21	25–18	25–22			75–61	Report
28 Oct	17:30	Phoenix Mecano Kecskemet (Hungary)	1–3	(Spain) Arona Tenerife	18–25	25–22	18–25	23–25		84–97	Report
28 Oct	19:00	Radnicki Kragujevac (Serbia)	3–0	(Switzerland) TV Amriswil	25–16	25–23	25–22			75–61	Report
20 Oct	17:30	OK Maribor (Slovenia)	1–3	(Montenegro) Budvanska Rivijera Budva	20–25	17–25	25–18	13–25		75–93	Report
28 Oct	16:00	PAOK Thessaloniki (Greece)	2–3	(Hungary) Kometa Kaposvar	25–22	25–21	17–25	18–25	11–15	96–108	Report
20 Oct	17:00	TOAC TUC Toulouse (France)	3–2	(France) Stade Poitevin Poitiers	14–25	30–28	25–18	15–25	15–11	99–107	Report
21 Oct	17:00	Seat Näfels (Switzerland)	3–0	(North Macedonia) 11 Oktomvri 2005 Priler	25–21	25–13	25–21			75–55	Report
28 Oct	17:30	Rabotnicki Fersped Skopje (North Macedonia)	1–3	(Turkey) İstanbul Büyükşehir Belediyesi	25–14	23–25	25–27	21–25		94–91	Report
27 Oct	18:00	Roma Volley (Italy)	3–2	(Finland) Pielaveden Sampo Pielavesi	25–23	20–25	25–19	21–25	19–17	110–109	Report

=== 8th Finals ===
Team 1	Agg.	Team 2	1st leg	2nd leg	Golden Set
Sartorius Asse Lennik (Belgium)	6–2	(Czech Republic) VK Dukla Liberec	3–0	3–2	
Fakel Novy Urengoy (Russia)	6–0	(Belgium) VC Menen	3–0	3–0	
Iskra Odintsovo (Russia)	4–3	(Poland) Wkręt-met D. AZS Częstochowa	3–0	1–3	13–15
Tomis Constanța (Romania)	6–3	(Austria) Hypo Tirol Innsbruck	3–1	3–2	
Arona Tenerife (Spain)	3–3	(Serbia) Radnicki Kragujevac	3–0	0–3	12–15
Budvanska Rivijera Budva (Montenegro)	6–2	(Hungary) Kometa Kaposvar	3–0	3–2	
TOAC TUC Toulouse (France)	6–0	(Switzerland) Seat Näfels	3–0	3–0	
İstanbul Büyükşehir Belediyesi (Turkey)	0–6	(Italy) Roma Volley	0–3	0–3	

==== First leg ====
Date	Time		Score		Set 1	Set 2	Set 3	Set 4	Set 5	Total	Report
11 Dec	20:30	Sartorius Asse Lennik (Belgium)	3–0	(Czech Republic) VK Dukla Liberec	25–21	25–19	25–23			75–63	Report
11 Dec	18:30	Fakel Novy Urengoy (Russia)	3–0	(Belgium) VC Menen	25–15	25–16	25–20			75–51	Report
11 Dec	19:30	Iskra Odintsovo (Russia)	3–0	(Poland) Wkręt-met AZS Częstochowa	25–14	25–17	25–19			75–50	Report
12 Dec	17:00	Tomis Constanța (Romania)	3–1	(Austria) Hypo Tirol Innsbruck	25–22	25–23	24–26	27–25		101–96	Report
12 Dec	19:30	Arona Tenerife (Spain)	3–0	(Serbia) Radnicki Kragujevac	25–21	32–30	25–22			82–73	Report
13 Dec	18:00	Budvanska Rivijera Budva (Montenegro)	3–0	(Hungary) Kometa Kaposvar	25–18	27–25	25–23			77–66	Report
12 Dec	20:00	TOAC TUC Toulouse (France)	3–0	(Switzerland) Seat Näfels	25–17	25–22	25–16			75–55	Report
13 Dec	17:00	İstanbul Büyükşehir Belediyesi (Turkey)	0–3	(Italy) Roma Volley	16–25	18–25	15–25			49–75	Report

==== Second leg ====
Date	Time		Score		Set 1	Set 2	Set 3	Set 4	Set 5	Total	Report
20 Dec	17:30	VK Dukla Liberec (Czech Republic)	2–3	(Belgium) Sartorius Asse Lennik	22–25	28–26	22–25	25–16	10–15	107–107	Report
20 Dec	20:00	VC Menen (Belgium)	0–3	(Russia) Fakel Novy Urengoy	23–25	18–25	22–25			63–75	Report
19 Dec	20:00	Wkręt-met AZS Częstochowa (Poland)	3–1	(Russia) Iskra Odintsovo	25–23	23–25	25–21	25–21		98–90	Report
Golden set		Wkręt-met AZS Częstochowa (Poland)	15–13	(Russia) Iskra Odintsovo							
19 Dec	20:15	Hypo Tirol Innsbruck (Austria)	2–3	(Romania) Tomis Constanța	25–20	14–25	25–21	18–25	7–15	89–106	Report
18 Dec	19:00	Radnicki Kragujevac (Serbia)	3–0	(Spain) Arona Tenerife	25–17	25–23	25–21			75–61	Report
Golden set		Radnicki Kragujevac (Serbia)	15–12	(Spain) Arona Tenerife							
19 Dec	19:00	Kometa Kaposvar (Hungary)	2–3	(Montenegro) Budvanska Rivijera Budva	25–18	25–22	24–26	14–25	11–15	99–106	Report
19 Dec	19:30	Seat Näfels (Switzerland)	0–3	(France) TOAC TUC Toulouse	18–25	22–25	13–25			53–75	Report
19 Dec	20:00	Roma Volley (Italy)	3–0	(Turkey) İstanbul Büyükşehir Belediyesi	25–21	25–23	25–23			75–67	Report

=== 4th Finals ===
Team 1	Agg.	Team 2	1st leg	2nd leg	Golden Set
Sartorius Asse Lennik (Belgium)	1–6	(Russia) Fakel Novy Urengoy	1–3	0–3	
Wkręt-met D. AZS Częstochowa (Poland)	4–3	(Romania) Tomis Constanța	3–0	1–3	17–15
Radnicki Kragujevac (Serbia)	2–6	(Montenegro) Budvanska Rivijera Budva	0–3	2–3	
TOAC TUC Toulouse (France)	3–6	(Italy) Roma Volley	1–3	2–3	

==== First leg ====
Date	Time		Score		Set 1	Set 2	Set 3	Set 4	Set 5	Total	Report
22 Jan	20:30	Sartorius Asse Lennik (Belgium)	1–3	(Russia) Fakel Novy Urengoy	16–25	25–20	23–25	17–25		81–95	Report
22 Jan	20:30	Wkręt-met AZS Częstochowa (Poland)	3–0	(Romania) Tomis Constanța	25–16	30–28	25–18			80–62	Report
23 Jan	19:00	Radnicki Kragujevac (Serbia)	0–3	(Montenegro) Budvanska Rivijera Budva	21–25	24–26	21–25			66–76	Report
23 Jan	20:00	TOAC TUC Toulouse (France)	1–3	(Italy) Roma Volley	15–25	23–25	25–21	21–25		84–96	Report

==== Second leg ====
Date	Time		Score		Set 1	Set 2	Set 3	Set 4	Set 5	Total	Report
30 Jan	18:30	Fakel Novy Urengoy (Russia)	3–0	(Belgium) Sartorius Asse Lennik	25–20	25–13	26–24			76–57	Report
31 Jan	20:15	Tomis Constanța (Romania)	3–1	(Poland) Wkręt-met AZS Częstochowa	25–22	23–25	25–22	25–22		98–91	Report
Golden set		Tomis Constanța (Romania)	15–17	(Poland) Wkręt-met AZS Częstochowa							
31 Jan	18:00	Budvanska Rivijera Budva (Montenegro)	3–2	(Serbia) Radnicki Kragujevac	25–23	22–25	25–14	21–25	15–11	108–98	Report
30 Jan	20:00	Roma Volley (Italy)	3–2	(France) TOAC TUC Toulouse	25–19	27–25	21–25	18–25	15–13	106–107	Report

== Challenge phase ==
Team 1	Agg.	Team 2	1st leg	2nd leg	Golden Set
Budućnost Podgorica (Montenegro)	3–4	(Montenegro) Budvanska Rivijera Budva	3–1	0–3	11–15
Noliko Maaseik (Belgium)	4–4	(Poland) Wkręt-met Domex Częstochowa	3–1	1–3	19–17
Iraklis Thessaloniki (Greece)	5–4	(Russia) Fakel Novy Urengoy	3–1	2–3	11–15
Olympiacos Piraeus (Greece)	0–6	(Italy) Roma Volley	0–3	0–3	

=== First leg ===
Date	Time		Score		Set 1	Set 2	Set 3	Set 4	Set 5	Total	Report
14 Feb	18:00	Budućnost Podgorica (Montenegro)	3–1	(Montenegro) Budvanska Rivijera Budva	21–25	25–22	25–23	25–21		96–91	Report
14 Feb	20:30	Noliko Maaseik (Belgium)	3–1	(Poland) Wkręt-met Częstochowa	22–25	25–15	25–20	25–22		97–82	Report
13 Feb	20:30	Iraklis Thessaloniki (Greece)	3–1	(Russia) Fakel Novy Urengoy	19–25	25–22	25–19	25–23		94–89	Report
14 Feb	19:00	Olympiacos Piraeus (Greece)	0–3	(Italy) Roma Volley	21–25	21–25	16–25			58–75	Report

=== Second leg ===
Date	Time		Score		Set 1	Set 2	Set 3	Set 4	Set 5	Total	Report
21 Feb	18:00	Budvanska Rivijera Budva (Montenegro)	3–0	(Montenegro) Budućnost Podgorica	25–20	25–17	25–18			75–55	Report
Golden set		Budvanska Rivijera Budva (Montenegro)	15–11	(Montenegro) Budućnost Podgorica							
20 Feb	20:30	Wkręt-met Częstochowa (Poland)	3–1	(Belgium) Noliko Maaseik	26–24	18–25	26–24	25–23		95–96	Report
Golden set		Wkręt-met Częstochowa (Poland)	17–19	(Belgium) Noliko Maaseik							
20 Feb	18:30	Fakel Novy Urengoy (Russia)	3–2	(Greece) Iraklis Thessaloniki	28–26	24–26	30–28	22–25	15–12	119–117	Report
Golden set		Fakel Novy Urengoy (Russia)	15–11	(Greece) Iraklis Thessaloniki							
21 Feb	20:00	Roma Volley (Italy)	3–0	(Greece) Olympiacos Piraeus	25–14	25–23	25–23			75–60	Report

== Final phase ==
- Venue: (Italy) Rome

Semifinals
23 March
(Montenegro) Budvanska Rivijera Budva	0
(Belgium) Noliko Maaseik	3
23 March
(Russia) Fakel Novy Urengoy	0
(Italy) Roma Volley	3

Final
24 March
(Belgium) Noliko Maaseik	0
(Italy) Roma Volley	3
3rd place match
24 March
(Montenegro) Budvanska Rivijera Budva	3
(Russia) Fakel Novy Urengoy	1

=== Semi finals ===
Date	Time		Score		Set 1	Set 2	Set 3	Set 4	Set 5	Total	Report
23 Mar	21:00	Budvanska Rivijera Budva (Montenegro)	0–3	(Belgium) Noliko Maaseik	17–25	19–25	18–25			54–75	Report
23 Mar	18:00	Fakel Novy Urengoy (Russia)	0–3	(Italy) Roma Volley	17–25	18–25	22–25			57–75	Report

=== 3rd place ===
Date	Time		Score		Set 1	Set 2	Set 3	Set 4	Set 5	Total	Report
24 Mar	16:00	Budvanska Rivijera Budva (Montenegro)	3–1	(Russia) Fakel Novy Urengoy	21–25	25–19	25–23	29–27		100–94	Report

=== Final ===
Date	Time		Score		Set 1	Set 2	Set 3	Set 4	Set 5	Total	Report
24 Mar	20:45	Noliko Maaseik (Belgium)	0–3	(Italy) Roma Volley	23–25	18–25	22–25			63–75	Report

== Final standing ==
Rank	Team
1st place, gold medalist(s)	(Italy) Roma Volley
2nd place, silver medalist(s)	(Belgium) Noliko Maaseik
3rd place, bronze medalist(s)	(Montenegro) Budvanska Rivijera Budva
4	(Russia) Fakel Novy Urengoy

2008 CEV Cup winner
(Italy)
Roma Volley
1st title

Manuel Coscione, Hubert Henno, Osvaldo Hernández, Wytze Kooistra, Leonel Marshall, Luigi Mastrangelo, Yasser Mayeta, Ivan Miljkovic, Marco Molteni, Cristian Savani, Andrea Semenzato, Paolo Tofoli
Head coach
Roberto Serniotti

== Awards ==
- Most valuable player

(Italy) Manuel Coscione (Roma Volley)

- Best setter

(Portugal) Nuno Pinheiro (Noliko Maaseik)

- Best receiver

(Canada) Nicholas Cundy (Noliko Maaseik)

- Best blocker

(Italy) Luigi Mastrangelo (Roma Volley)

- Best spiker

(Serbia) Ivan Miljković (Roma Volley)

- Best server

(Italy) Luigi Mastrangelo (Roma Volley)

- Best scorer

(Bulgaria) Krasimir Stefanov (Budvanska Rivijera Budva)
