= Eerik Jago =

Estonian-Finnish volleyball player

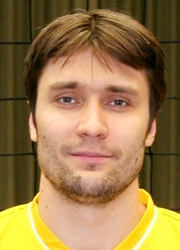
- Eerik Jago in 2011

Personal information
- Nationality: Estonian
- Born: 29 December 1980 (age 45); Tallinn, then part of Estonian SSR, Soviet Union
- Hometown: Salo, Finland
- Height: 1.93 m (6 ft 4 in)
- Weight: 87 kg (192 lb)
- Spike: 315 cm (124 in)
- Block: 335 cm (132 in)
- Education: University of Turku

Volleyball information
- Position: opposite hitter

Career
| Years | Teams |
|---|---|
| 1996–2001; 2001–2004; 2004–2005; 2005–2006; 2006–2007; 2007–2008; 2008–2009; 2009–2010; 2010; 2010–2012; 2012; 2012–2013 | (Finland) Rocks Helsinki (Finland) Salon Piivolley (Belgium) Oosthout Torhout (Netherlands) Piet Zoomers Apeldoorn (Italy) Sempre Padova (Italy) Stilcasa Volley Taviano (Italy) Pineto Volley (Austria) Hypo Tirol Innsbruck (Finland) Salon Piivolley (Italy) Volley Milano (Belgium) Knack Randstad Roeselare (Finland) Hurrikaani Loimaa |

National team
| 2000–2011 | Estonia (123 games) |
- Last updated: 19 May 2022

Eerik Jago (born 29 December 1980) is an Estonian volleyball player.

He was born in Tallinn. In 2013 he graduated from Turku polytechnical school.

He started his volleyball exercising in 1991. He was coached by Andres Toode, Andres Skuin, Pasi Rautio, Avo Keel, Andrei Ojamets. 2000–2011 he was a member of Estonia men's national volleyball team. He has played in Finnish, Belgium, Dutch, Italian and Austrian clubs.

In 2005 he was named as Best Male Volleyball Player of Estonia.

== Estonian national team ==
As a member of the senior Estonia men's national volleyball team, Jago competed at the 2009 and the 2011 Men's European Volleyball Championship.

== Sporting achievements ==
=== Clubs ===
MEVZA Cup

- 2009/2010 - with Hypo Tirol Innsbruck

National championship

- 2003/2004 Finnish Championship, with Salon Piivolley
- 2005/2006 Dutch Championship, with Piet Zoomers Apeldoorn
- 2009/2010 Austrian Championship, with Hypo Tirol Innsbruck
- 2012/2013 Finnish Championship, with Hurrikaani Loimaa

National cup

- 2000/2001 Finnish Cup, with Rocks Helsinki
- 2003/2004 Finnish Cup, with Salon Piivolley

=== Individual ===
- 2004 Finnish League – All-Star
- 2004 Finnish League – Most Valuable Player
- 2005 Estonian Volleyball Player of the Year
