= 2008–09 CEV Cup =

- League: CEV Cup
- Sport: Volleyball
- Duration: 5 November 2008 – 22 March 2009

Finals
- Champions: (Russia) Lokomotiv-Belogorie Belgorod
- Runners-up: (Greece) Panathinaikos Athens
- Finals MVP: (Colombia) Liberman Agamez (ATH)

CEV Cup seasons
- ← 2007–08 2009–10 →

The 2008–09 CEV Cup was the 37th edition of the European CEV Cup volleyball club tournament.

Lokomotiv-Belogorie Belgorod beat Panathinaikos Athens in the finale. Colombian Liberman Agamez was chosen the Most Valuable Player of the tournament.

== Participating teams ==
Country	Number of teams	Teams
Austria	1 +1	Hypo Tirol Innsbruck, aon hotVolleys Vienna
Belgium	2	Handelsgids Averbode, Euphony Asse Lennik
Cyprus	1	Anorthosis Famagusta
Czech Republic	1	VK Dukla Liberec
Finland	2	Pielaveden Sampo Pielavesi, Perungan Pojat Rovaniemi
France	2 +2	AS Cannes, Stade Poitevin Poitiers, AS Beauvais Oise, Paris Volley
Germany	1	SCC Berlin
Greece	2 +1	GC Lamia, Olympiacos Piraeus, Panathinaikos Athens
Hungary	2	Dunaferr Dunaújváros, Kometa Kaposvar
Italy	1	Bre Banca Lannutti Cuneo
Macedonia	1	Rabotnicki Fersped Skopje
Montenegro	1	Budvanska Rivijera Budva, Budućnost Podgorica
Netherlands	1	Ortec Nesselande Rotterdam
Poland	2	Jastrzębski Węgiel, Mlekpol Olsztyn
Romania	2	L.P.S. Piatra Neamţ, Tomis Constanța
Russia	2	Lokomotiv-Belogorie Belgorod, Lokomotiv Novosibirsk
Spain	2	Arona Tenerife, Unicaja Almería
Serbia	1	Radnički Kombank Kragujevac
Slovenia	1	Salonit Anhovo Kanal
Switzerland	2	TV Amriswil, Lausanne UC
Turkey	1	Halkbank Ankara

== Main phase ==
=== 16th Finals ===
The 16 winning teams from the 1/16 Finals will compete in the 1/8 Finals playing Home & Away matches. The losers of the 1/16 Final matches will qualify for the 3rd round in Challenge Cup.

Team 1	Agg.	Team 2	1st leg	2nd leg	Golden Set
Olympiacos Piraeus (Greece)	6–1	(Poland) Jastrzębski Węgiel	3–0	3–1	
Tomis Constanța (Romania)	4–5	(Austria) Hypo Tirol Innsbruck	3–2	1–3	
Salonit Anhovo Kanal (Slovenia)	2–6	(Finland) Pielaveden Sampo Pielavesi	2–3	0–3	
Anorthosis Famagusta (Cyprus)	3–6	(France) Stade Poitevin Poitiers	2–3	1–3	
Bre Banca Lannutti Cuneo (Italy)	5–5	(France) AS Cannes	2–3	3–2	15–6
L.P.S. Piatra Neamţ (Romania)	2–6	(Serbia) Radnički Kombank Kragujevac	2–3	0–3	
VK Dukla Liberec (Czech Republic)	6–0	(Hungary) Dunaferr Dunaújváros	3–0	3–0	
Budvanska Rivijera Budva (Montenegro)	6–1	(Belgium) Euphony Asse Lennik	3–0	3–1	
SCC Berlin (Germany)	4–4	(Greece) GC Lamia	3–1	1–3	11–15
Rabotnicki Fersped Skopje (North Macedonia)	0–6	(Netherlands) Ortec Nesselande Rotterdam	0–3	0–3	
Perungan Pojat Rovaniemi (Finland)	5–3	(Hungary) Kometa Kaposvar	3–0	2–3	
Lokomotiv-Belogorie Belgorod (Russia)	6–0	(Poland) Mlekpol Olsztyn	3–0	3–0	
Unicaja Almería (Spain)	6–3	(Switzerland) Lausanne UC	3–2	3–1	
TV Amriswil (Switzerland)	2–6	(Turkey) Halkbank Ankara	0–3	2–3	
Budućnost Podgorica (Montenegro)	6–0	(Belgium) Handelsgids Averbode	3–0	3–0	
Arona Tenerife (Spain)	2–6	(Russia) Lokomotiv Novosibirsk	0–3	2–3	

==== First leg ====
Date	Time		Score		Set 1	Set 2	Set 3	Set 4	Set 5	Total	Report
5 Nov	20:00	Olympiacos Piraeus (Greece)	3–2	(Poland) Jastrzębski Węgiel	18–25	25–21	25–23	21–25	15–7	104–101	Report
5 Nov	17:00	Tomis Constanța (Romania)	3–2	(Austria) Hypo Tirol Innsbruck	18–25	20–25	25–18	29–27	21–19	113–114	Report
5 Nov	19:00	Salonit Anhovo Kanal (Slovenia)	2–3	(Finland) Pielaveden Sampo Pielavesi	25–22	13–25	26–24	24–26	12–15	100–112	Report
5 Nov	20:00	Anorthosis Famagusta (Cyprus)	2–3	(France) Stade Poitevin Poitiers	25–21	25–27	25–21	16–25	9–15	100–109	Report
6 Nov	20:30	Bre Banca Lannutti Cuneo (Italy)	2–3	(France) AS Cannes	20–25	25–15	25–17	21–25	11–15	102–97	Report
5 Nov	17:00	L.P.S. Piatra Neamţ (Romania)	2–3	(Serbia) Radnički Kombank Kragujevac	25–22	17–25	25–19	20–25	12–15	99–106	Report
5 Nov	18:00	VK Dukla Liberec (Czech Republic)	3–0	(Hungary) Dunaferr Dunaújváros	25–21	25–15	29–27			79–63	Report
6 Nov	19:00	Budvanska Rivijera Budva (Montenegro)	3–0	(Belgium) Euphony Asse Lennik	25–16	25–16	25–18			75–50	Report
5 Nov	19:00	SCC Berlin (Germany)	3–1	(Greece) GC Lamia	25–16	28–26	23–25	25–22		101–89	Report
4 Nov	20:15	Rabotnicki Fersped Skopje (North Macedonia)	0–3	(Netherlands) Ortec Nesselande Rotterdam	19–25	22–25	19–25			60–75	Report
5 Nov	18:30	Perungan Pojat Rovaniemi (Finland)	3–0	(Hungary) Kometa Kaposvar	25–18	25–19	25–20			75–57	Report
4 Nov	18:00	Lokomotiv-Belogorie Belgorod (Russia)	3–0	(Poland) Mlekpol Olsztyn	25–23	25–17	25–21			75–61	Report
6 Nov	20:30	Unicaja Almería (Spain)	3–2	(Switzerland) Lausanne UC	26–24	25–21	16–25	23–25	15–7	105–102	Report
5 Nov	20:00	TV Amriswil (Switzerland)	0–3	(Turkey) Halkbank Ankara	17–25	21–25	21–25			59–75	Report
–	–	Budućnost Podgorica (Montenegro)	3–0	(Belgium) Handelsgids Averbode	25–0	25–0	25–0			75–0	Report
5 Nov	19:00	Arona Tenerife (Spain)	0–3	(Russia) Lokomotiv Novosibirsk	14–25	20–25	23–25			57–75	Report

==== Second leg ====
Date	Time		Score		Set 1	Set 2	Set 3	Set 4	Set 5	Total	Report
13 Nov	20:00	Jastrzębski Węgiel (Poland)	1–3	(Greece) Olympiacos Piraeus	20–25	16–25	25–18	19–25		80–93	Report
12 Nov	20:15	Hypo Tirol Innsbruck (Austria)	3–1	(Romania) Tomis Constanța	25–20	22–25	25–20	25–22		97–87	Report
12 Nov	18:30	Pielaveden Sampo Pielavesi (Finland)	3–0	(Slovenia) Salonit Anhovo Kanal	25–19	25–13	25–19			75–51	Report
12 Nov	00:00	Stade Poitevin Poitiers (France)	3–1	(Cyprus) Anorthosis Famagusta	25–19	25–22	20–25	25–20		95–86	Report
12 Nov	20:00	AS Cannes (France)	2–3	(Italy) Bre Banca Lannutti Cuneo	23–25	25–16	22–25	25–17	6–15	101–98	Report
Golden set		AS Cannes (France)	6–15	(Italy) Bre Banca Lannutti Cuneo							
12 Nov	19:00	Radnički Kombank Kragujevac (Serbia)	3–0	(Romania) L.P.S. Piatra Neamţ	25–17	25–15	25–16			75–48	Report
12 Nov	00:00	Dunaferr Dunaújváros (Hungary)	0–3	(Czech Republic) VK Dukla Liberec	18–25	12–25	18–25			48–75	Report
11 Nov	15:30	Euphony Asse Lennik (Belgium)	1–3	(Montenegro) Budvanska Rivijera Budva	16–25	25–23	22–25	23–25		86–98	Report
12 Nov	19:00	GC Lamia (Greece)	3–1	(Germany) SCC Berlin	23–25	25–14	25–17	32–30		105–86	Report
Golden set		GC Lamia (Greece)	15–11	(Germany) SCC Berlin							
11 Nov	20:30	Ortec Nesselande Rotterdam (Netherlands)	3–0	(North Macedonia) Rabotnicki Fersped Skopje	25–16	28–26	25–22			78–64	Report
12 Nov	19:00	Kometa Kaposvar (Hungary)	3–2	(Finland) Perungan Pojat Rovaniemi	23–25	22–25	25–17	25–15	15–10	110–92	Report
12 Nov	18:00	Mlekpol Olsztyn (Poland)	0–3	(Russia) Lokomotiv-Belogorie Belgorod	17–25	13–25	22–25			52–75	Report
12 Nov	18:30	Lausanne UC (Switzerland)	1–3	(Spain) Unicaja Almería	22–25	25–19	16–25	17–25		80–94	Report
12 Nov	18:30	Halkbank Ankara (Turkey)	3–2	(Switzerland) TV Amriswil	25–23	23–25	22–25	25–23	15–4	110–100	Report
–	–	Handelsgids Averbode (Belgium)	0–3	(Montenegro) Budućnost Podgorica	0–25	0–25	0–25			0–75	Report
12 Nov	19:00	Lokomotiv Novosibirsk (Russia)	3–2	(Spain) Arona Tenerife	25–22	22–25	14–25	28–26	15–9	104–107	Report

=== 8th Finals ===
Team 1	Agg.	Team 2	1st leg	2nd leg	Golden Set
Olympiacos Piraeus (Greece)	6–1	(Austria) Hypo Tirol Innsbruck	3–0	3–1	
Pielaveden Sampo Pielavesi (Finland)	0–6	(France) Stade Poitevin Poitiers	0–3	0–3	
Bre Banca Lannutti Cuneo (Italy)	6–0	(Serbia) Radnički Kombank Kragujevac	3–0	3–0	
VK Dukla Liberec (Czech Republic)	3–4	(Montenegro) Budvanska Rivijera Budva	3–1	0–3	
GC Lamia (Greece)	6–2	(Netherlands) Ortec Nesselande Rotterdam	3–1	3–1	
Perungan Pojat Rovaniemi (Finland)	3–4	(Russia) Lokomotiv-Belogorie Belgorod	3–1	0–3	
Unicaja Almería (Spain)	5–3	(Turkey) Halkbank Ankara	3–0	2–3	
Budućnost Podgorica (Montenegro)	3–3	(Russia) Lokomotiv Novosibirsk	3–0	0–3	12–15

==== First leg ====
Date	Time		Score		Set 1	Set 2	Set 3	Set 4	Set 5	Total	Report
9 Dec	20:00	Olympiacos Piraeus (Greece)	3–0	(Austria) Hypo Tirol Innsbruck	25–21	25–21	25–21			75–63	Report
10 Dec	18:30	Pielaveden Sampo Pielavesi (Finland)	0–3	(France) Stade Poitevin Poitiers	15–25	21–25	21–25			57–75	Report
10 Dec	20:30	Bre Banca Lannutti Cuneo (Italy)	3–0	(Serbia) Radnički Kombank Kragujevac	25–19	25–14	25–23			75–56	Report
10 Dec	18:00	VK Dukla Liberec (Czech Republic)	3–1	(Montenegro) Budvanska Rivijera Budva	22–25	25–23	25–18	25–20		97–86	Report
10 Dec	19:00	GC Lamia (Greece)	3–1	(Netherlands) Ortec Nesselande Rotterdam	26–28	25–21	27–25	25–23		103–97	Report
10 Dec	18:30	Perungan Pojat Rovaniemi (Finland)	3–1	(Russia) Lokomotiv-Belogorie Belgorod	25–20	25–21	16–25	25–23		91–89	Report
11 Dec	20:30	Unicaja Almería (Spain)	3–0	(Turkey) Halkbank Ankara	25–21	25–21	25–23			75–65	Report
10 Dec	18:00	Budućnost Podgorica (Montenegro)	3–0	(Russia) Lokomotiv Novosibirsk	25–23	25–23	25–23			75–69	Report

==== Second leg ====
Date	Time		Score		Set 1	Set 2	Set 3	Set 4	Set 5	Total	Report
16 Dec	20:15	Hypo Tirol Innsbruck (Austria)	1–3	(Greece) Olympiacos Piraeus	19–25	19–25	25–15	25–27		88–92	Report
17 Dec	20:00	Stade Poitevin Poitiers (France)	3–0	(Finland) Pielaveden Sampo Pielavesi	25–21	25–23	26–24			76–68	Report
17 Dec	19:00	Radnički Kombank Kragujevac (Serbia)	0–3	(Italy) Bre Banca Lannutti Cuneo	20–25	14–25	23–25			57–75	Report
17 Dec	19:00	Budvanska Rivijera Budva (Montenegro)	3–0	(Czech Republic) VK Dukla Liberec	25–17	25–15	25–15			75–47	Report
16 Dec	20:30	Ortec Nesselande Rotterdam (Netherlands)	1–3	(Greece) GC Lamia	25–22	22–25	22–25	24–26		93–98	Report
17 Dec	19:00	Lokomotiv-Belogorie Belgorod (Russia)	3–0	(Finland) Perungan Pojat Rovaniemi	25–22	25–22	25–22			75–66	Report
17 Dec	19:00	Halkbank Ankara (Turkey)	3–2	(Spain) Unicaja Almería	25–19	25–18	21–25	15–25	15–9	101–96	Report
18 Dec	19:00	Lokomotiv Novosibirsk (Russia)	3–0	(Montenegro) Budućnost Podgorica	25–17	25–17	25–17			75–51	Report
Golden set		Lokomotiv Novosibirsk (Russia)	15–12	(Montenegro) Budućnost Podgorica							

=== 4th Finals ===
Team 1	Agg.	Team 2	1st leg	2nd leg
Olympiacos Piraeus (Greece)	4–3	(France) Stade Poitevin Poitiers	3–0	1–3
Bre Banca Lannutti Cuneo (Italy)	6–2	(Montenegro) Budvanska Rivijera Budva	3–0	3–2
GC Lamia (Greece)	1–6	(Russia) Lokomotiv-Belogorie Belgorod	1–3	0–3
Unicaja Almería (Spain)	4–3	(Russia) Lokomotiv Novosibirsk	3–0	1–3

==== First leg ====
Date	Time		Score		Set 1	Set 2	Set 3	Set 4	Set 5	Total	Report
14 Jan	20:00	Olympiacos Piraeus (Greece)	3–0	(France) Stade Poitevin Poitiers	26–24	25–11	25–17			76–52	Report
14 Jan	20:30	Bre Banca Lannutti Cuneo (Italy)	3–0	(Montenegro) Budvanska Rivijera Budva	25–22	25–11	30–28			80–61	Report
14 Jan	19:00	GC Lamia (Greece)	1–3	(Russia) Lokomotiv-Belogorie Belgorod	25–22	13–25	18–25	15–25		71–97	Report
15 Jan	20:30	Unicaja Almería (Spain)	3–0	(Russia) Lokomotiv Novosibirsk	25–17	25–23	25–20			75–60	Report

==== Second leg ====
Date	Time		Score		Set 1	Set 2	Set 3	Set 4	Set 5	Total	Report
21 Jan	20:00	Stade Poitevin Poitiers (France)	3–1	(Greece) Olympiacos Piraeus	25–20	19–25	25–22	25–21		94–88	Report
20 Jan	19:00	Budvanska Rivijera Budva (Montenegro)	2–3	(Italy) Bre Banca Lannutti Cuneo	25–22	27–29	19–25	25–20	12–15	108–111	Report
21 Jan	19:00	Lokomotiv-Belogorie Belgorod (Russia)	3–0	(Greece) GC Lamia	25–21	25–12	25–22			75–55	Report
21 Jan	19:00	Lokomotiv Novosibirsk (Russia)	3–1	(Spain) Unicaja Almería	25–21	25–18	21–25	25–22		96–86	Report

== Challenge phase ==
Team 1	Agg.	Team 2	1st leg	2nd leg
AS Beauvais Oise (France)	0–6	(Russia) Lokomotiv-Belogorie Belgorod	0–3	0–3
Paris Volley (France)	4–5	(Spain) Unicaja Almería	3–2	1–3
aon hotVolleys Vienna (Austria)	0–6	(Italy) Bre Banca Lannutti Cuneo	0–3	0–3
Panathinaikos Athens (Greece)	5–3	(Greece) Olympiacos Piraeus	3–0	2–3

=== First leg ===
Date	Time		Score		Set 1	Set 2	Set 3	Set 4	Set 5	Total	Report
11 Feb	20:00	AS Beauvais Oise (France)	0–3	(Russia) Lokomotiv-Belogorie Belgorod	19–25	23–25	23–25			65–75	Report
11 Feb	20:00	Paris Volley (France)	3–2	(Spain) Unicaja Almería	19–25	25–27	25–21	25–21	15–12	109–106	Report
11 Feb	20:20	aon hotVolleys Vienna (Austria)	0–3	(Italy) Bre Banca Lannutti Cuneo	19–25	23–25	21–25			63–75	Report
11 Feb	18:00	Panathinaikos Athens (Greece)	3–0	(Greece) Olympiacos Piraeus	29–27	25–23	25–21			79–71	Report

=== Second leg ===
Date	Time		Score		Set 1	Set 2	Set 3	Set 4	Set 5	Total	Report
18 Feb	19:00	Lokomotiv-Belogorie Belgorod (Russia)	3–0	(France) AS Beauvais Oise	25–22	25–10	25–15			75–47	Report
19 Feb	20:30	Unicaja Almería (Spain)	3–1	(France) Paris Volley	25–21	25–27	25–22	27–25		102–95	Report
18 Feb	20:30	Bre Banca Lannutti Cuneo (Italy)	3–0	(Austria) aon hotVolleys Vienna	29–27	25–19	25–22			79–68	Report
19 Feb	19:00	Olympiacos Piraeus (Greece)	3–2	(Greece) Panathinaikos Athens	20–25	25–18	22–25	25–18	18–16	110–102	Report

== Final phase ==
- Venue: (Greece) Athens Olympic Indoor Hall, Athens

Semifinals
21 March
(Russia) Lokomotiv-Belogorie Belgorod	3
(Spain) Unicaja Almería	1
21 March
(Italy) Bre Banca Lannutti Cuneo	2
(Greece) Panathinaikos Athens	3

Final
22 March
(Russia) Lokomotiv-Belogorie Belgorod	3
(Greece) Panathinaikos Athens	1
3rd place match
22 March
(Spain) Unicaja Almería	1
(Italy) Bre Banca Lannutti Cuneo	3

=== Semi finals ===
Date	Time		Score		Set 1	Set 2	Set 3	Set 4	Set 5	Total	Report
21 Mar	19:30	Lokomotiv-Belogorie Belgorod (Russia)	3–1	(Spain) Unicaja Almería	23–25	25–22	25–18	25–23		98–88	Report
21 Mar	17:00	Bre Banca Lannutti Cuneo (Italy)	2–3	(Greece) Panathinaikos Athens	25–23	25–18	15–25	20–25	6–15	91–106	Report

=== 3rd place ===
Date	Time		Score		Set 1	Set 2	Set 3	Set 4	Set 5	Total	Report
22 Mar	14:00	Unicaja Almería (Spain)	1–3	(Italy) Bre Banca Lannutti Cuneo	25–18	22–25	18–25	18–25		83–93	Report

=== Final ===
Date	Time		Score		Set 1	Set 2	Set 3	Set 4	Set 5	Total	Report
22 Mar	16:30	Lokomotiv-Belogorie Belgorod (Russia)	3–1	(Greece) Panathinaikos Athens	25–19	17–25	25–20	25–20		92–84	Report

== Final standing ==
Rank	Team
1st place, gold medalist(s)	(Russia) Lokomotiv-Belogorie Belgorod
2nd place, silver medalist(s)	(Greece) Panathinaikos Athens
3rd place, bronze medalist(s)	(Italy) Bre Banca Lannutti Cuneo
4	(Spain) Unicaja Almería

2009 CEV Cup winner
(Russia)
Lokomotiv-Belogorie Belgorod
1st title

Sergey Baranov, Gundars Celitans, Anton Fomenko, Denis Ignatyev, Vadim Khamuttskikh, Sergey Khoroshev, Taras Khtey, Alexander Kosarev, Richard Lambourne, Dmitriy Muserskiy, Dmitry Shestak, Sergey Tetyukhin
Head coach
Gennady Shipulin

== Awards ==
- Most valuable player

(Colombia) Liberman Agamez (Panathinaikos Athens)

- Best setter

(Russia) Denis Ignatyev (Lokomotiv-Belogorie Belgorod)

- Best receiver

(France) Renaud Herpe (Panathinaikos Athens)

- Best blocker

(Bulgaria) Vladimir Nikolov (Bre Banca Lannutti Cuneo)

- Best spiker

(Greece) Ilias Lappas (Panathinaikos Athens)

- Best server

(Russia) Sergey Khoroshev (Lokomotiv-Belogorie Belgorod)

- Best scorer

(Colombia) Liberman Agamez (Panathinaikos Athens)
