= Luke Smith (volleyball) =

Australian volleyball player (born 1990)

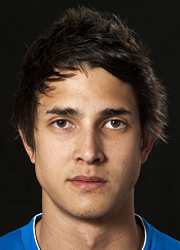

Personal information
- Full name: Luke Dwi Putra Smith
- Born: 30 August 1990 (age 36); Jakarta, Indonesia
- Height: 2.04 m (6 ft 8 in)
- Spike: 360 cm (142 in)
- Block: 340 cm (134 in)

Volleyball information
- Current club: (Poland) Cuprum Lubin
- Number: 14

Career
Years	Teams
2008–2009; 2009–2010; 2011–2012; 2012–2013; 2013–2014; 2014–2015; 2015–2017; 2017–2018; 2018; 2019	University of Western Australia; Australian Institute of Sport (Sweden) Linköpings VC (Italy) Volley Corigliano (Czech Republic) Kocouři VAVEX Příbram (Germany) TSV Herrsching (Finland) Hurrikaani Loimaa (Portugal) Sporting CP (Turkey) Afyon Belediyespor Yüntaş (Poland) Cuprum Lubin

National team
Australia
Honours
Representing Australia
Men's volleyball
Asian Championship
Silver medal – second place	2019 Tehran	Team

Luke Smith (born 30 August 1990 in Jakarta, Indonesia) is an Australian professional volleyballer.

Smith was born in Jakarta to an Indonesian mother and English father, before moving to Albany, Western Australia, where he spent much of his early life. His family moved to Norway, before settling in the suburb of Rossmoyne near Perth.

He started playing volleyball in grade 10 at Aquinas College in Salter Point. He since spent time on a scholarship at the Australian Institute of Sport (AIS) in Canberra, and spent two years playing semi-professionally for Linkoping Volleyball Club in Linkoping, Sweden. Whilst at the AIS he played in the 2008 Youth and 2010 Junior Asian Championships.

He made his debut for the Australian national volleyball team in 2011 against Thailand at the age of 20. He represented Australia at the 2012 Summer Olympics in London.

From January 2019, he signed a contract with Polish club Cuprum Lubin.

== Sporting achievements ==
=== Clubs ===
Swedish Championship:

- 2012

Finnish Championship:

- 2017
- 2016

Portuguese Championship:

- 2018
