= Matti Hietanen =

Finnish volleyball player (born 1983)

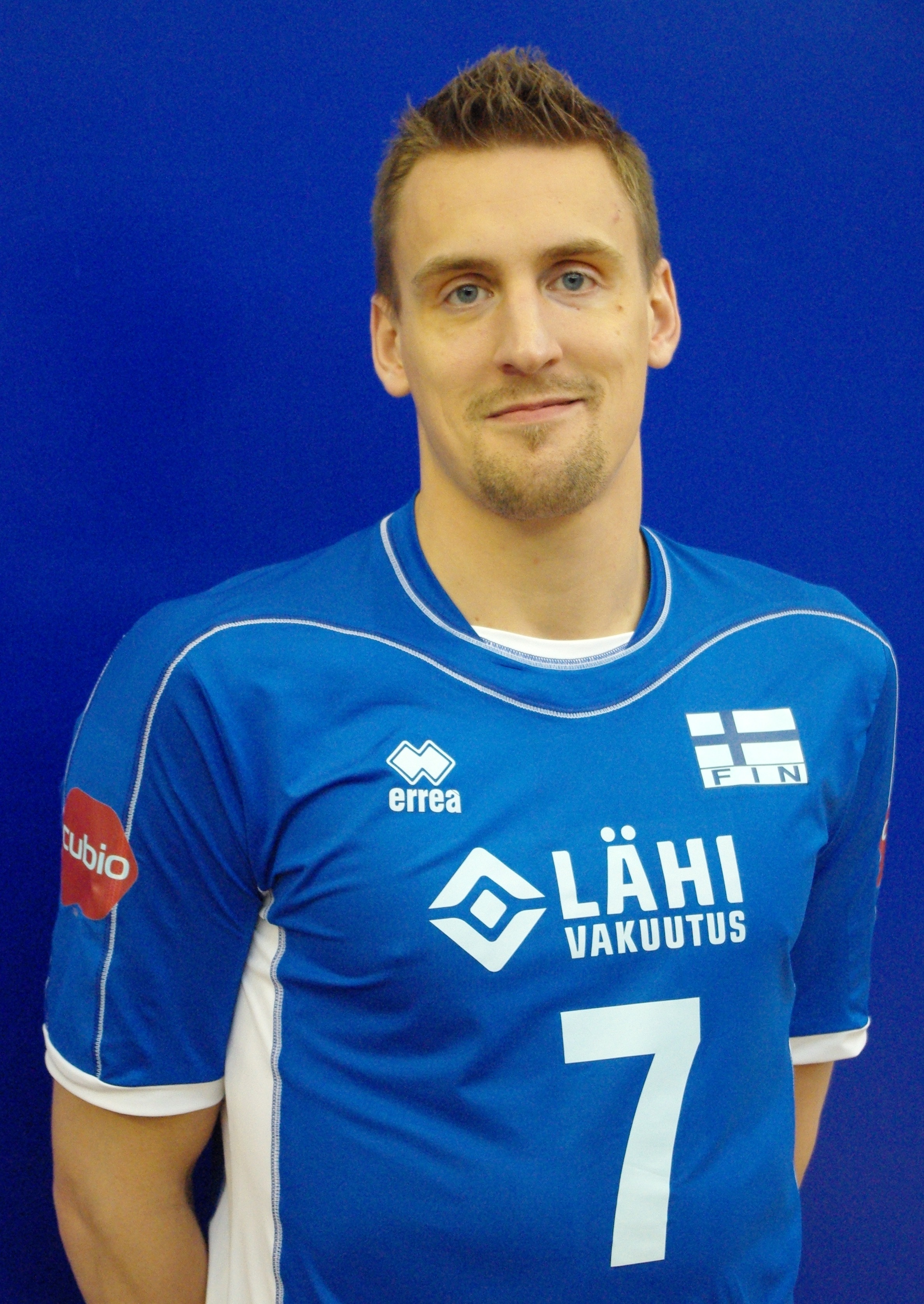

Personal information
- Nationality: Finnish
- Born: 3 January 1983 (age 43); Helsinki, Finland
- Height: 1.99 m (6 ft 6 in)
- Weight: 93 kg (205 lb)
- Spike: 340 cm (134 in)
- Block: 315 cm (124 in)

Volleyball information
- Position: Opposite/Outside hitter
- Current club: Tampereen Isku-Volley
- Number: 7

Career
Years	Teams
2000–2001; 2001–2003; 2003–2005; 2005–2006; 2006–2007; 2007–2008; 2008–2009; 2009–2010; 2010–2011; 2011–2013; 2013–2014; 2014–2015; 2015–2016; 2017; 2017–	Tampereen Isku-Volley; Salon Piivolley; Tampereen Isku-Volley; Sempre Volley; Avignon VB; Top Team Mantova; Framasil Pineto; P.A.O.K. Thessaloniki; Sir Safety Perugia; Lotos Trefl Gdańsk; Al-Shabab Dubai; Kokkolan Tiikerit; PV Lugano; VK Kladno; Tampereen Isku-Volley

National team
2004–	Finland
- Last updated: 29 December 2017

Matti Hietanen (born 3 January 1983) is a professional volleyball player from Finland.

== Career ==
=== Early career ===
Hietanen started his career with Vilppula Tähti. After that he moved to Tampere and started study in Varala Sport High School. At the same time he played on the youth national team. At the youth national teams U-19 European Championship qualifications, Hietanen was the best player, but Finland did not survive to European Championships.

=== Finland league ===
Hietanen played his first season in the Finland volleyball league season of 2000–2001. His club was Tampereen Isku-Volley. After one season in Isku-Volley he made a two-year contract with Salon Piivolley. During season 2001–2003 Hietanen played in Piivolley, but when his contract ended he came back to Tampereen Isku-Volley.

Hietanen did not win anything with Isku-Volley season 2003–2004, but during season 2004–2005 he won Finland volleyball league bronze when Isku-Volley won Raision Loimu in the bronze medal match. The media chose him after the season for the league All-Stars team. After this season he made a contract with Sempre Volley Padova.

=== Professional career ===
Hietanen made a longer three-season contract with Sempre Volley Padova. On the same club were two Finnish setters, Mikko Esko and Simo-Pekka Olli. Hietanen's first season in Padova was difficult. German opposite-player Christian Pampel was team leader opposite player and Matti was forced to second opposite player role. After season Padova rented him to the France Pro A-league. He played season 2006–2007 in Avignon Volley. When the season ended Avignon fell to France Pro B-league.

After the season Hietanen came back to Italy and made a contract with Mantova Volley. He was a rented player in Mantova because Padova still had his license. He played a good season in Mantova Volley.

During season 2008–2009 Hietanen played in Framasil Cucine Pineto in the Italy A1-league.

== National team ==
Hietanen played his first national team game in the 2004 season. During season 2005 he got a good opportunity when the national team needed a new opposite player. Before that time, Hietanen had only played wing-spiker but he changed roles and became the team opposite player. His team took fourth place in the European Championships 2007.
