= Matti Oivanen =

Finnish volleyball player (born 1986)

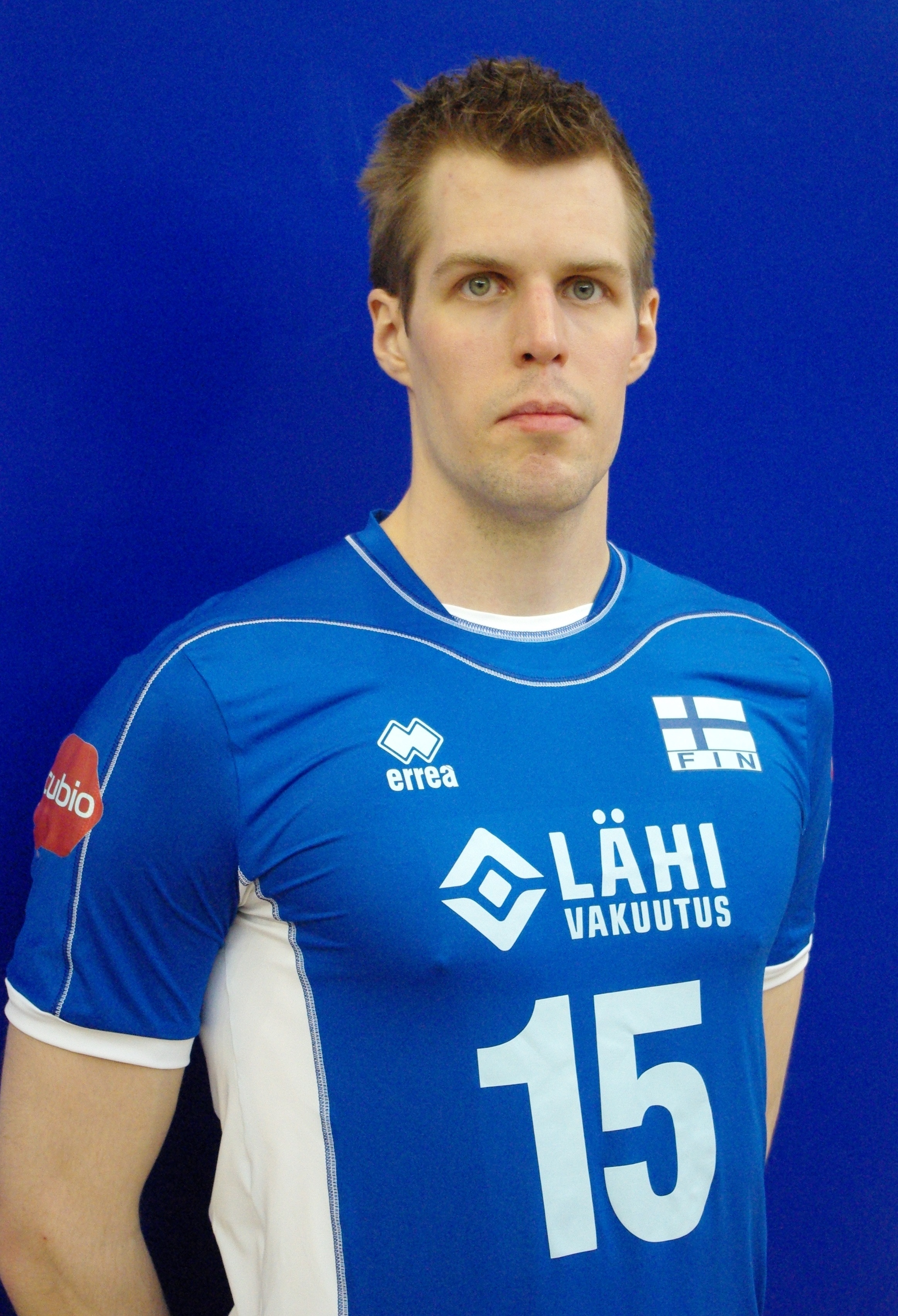

Personal information
- Full name: Matti Tapio Oivanen
- Nationality: Finnish
- Born: 26 May 1986 (age 40); Huittinen, Finland
- Height: 1.98 m (6 ft 6 in)
- Weight: 90 kg (198 lb)
- Spike: 355 cm (140 in)
- Block: 320 cm (130 in)

Volleyball information
- Position: Middle blocker
- Current team: Hurrikaani Loimaa
- Number: 15

Career
Years	Teams
2001–2002; 2002–2003; 2003–2004; 2004–2005; 2004–2006; 2006–2008; 2008–2009; 2009–2010; 2010–2011; 2011–2012; 2012; 2012–2013; 2013–2014; 2014–	Kiikoisten Kirma; Kuortane; Vammalan Lentopallo; Fakel Novy Urengoy; Raision Loimu; Pielaveden Sampo; Beauvais OUC; Copra Berni Piacenza; Volley Forlì; Guberniya Nizhniy Novgorod; Al-Arabi Doha; Hurrikaani Loimaa; Indykpol AZS Olsztyn; Hurrikaani Loimaa

National team
2005–	Finland
Honours
Representing Finland
European League
Silver medal – second place	2005 Russia
- Last updated: 21 February 2017

Matti Tapio Oivanen (born 26 May 1986 in Huittinen) is a Finnish volleyball player, a member of Finland men's national volleyball team and Finnish club Hurrikaani Loimaa. His twin brother is Mikko Oivanen, also a volleyball player.

== Career ==
Matti Oivanen was born on 26 May 1986 in Huittinen, Finland, the same day as his brother Mikko Oivanen. He began his volleyball career with his brother, playing for Kiikoisten Kirma. During this time, the pair was selected by coaches for the Finland youth national volleyball team. They moved to Kuortane, Finland, to attend high school, where they trained with the national team until graduation. Oivanen and his brother also played with Vammalan Lentopallo during their last years of high school, until they graduated in 2004.

=== Raision Loimu ===
After leaving Kuortane in 2004, Oivanen signed a contract with the Raision Loimu team, which plays in the Finland volleyball league. While there, he helped the team achieve fourth place in the league championship. During his second season, he helped the team make it to the finals, where they lost to Napapiirin Palloketut.

=== Pielaveden Sampo ===
After two seasons with Loimu, Oivanen left the team and signed with Pielaveden Sampo. His brother signed with Rovaniemen Santasport, marking the first time the two had separated since they started playing volleyball years earlier. Oivanen helped Sampo win the Finland Cup Championship, while they lost the Finland league championship. During his second season with the team, he led them to the Finland Cup Championship, but lost in the finals to Santasport.

=== Beauvais Oise ===
During the 2008–2009 season, Oivanen played in France's Pro A league with Beauvais OUC.

=== Copra Berni Piacenza ===
In the 2009–2010 season, Oivanen played with the Italian Volleyball League club Copra Berni Piacenza.

=== Yoga Volley Forlì ===
During the 2010–2011 season, Matti will play in the A1 Italian League with Yoga Volley Forlì 1975.

In 2013/2014 was a player of Polish team Indykpol AZS Olsztyn.

== National team ==
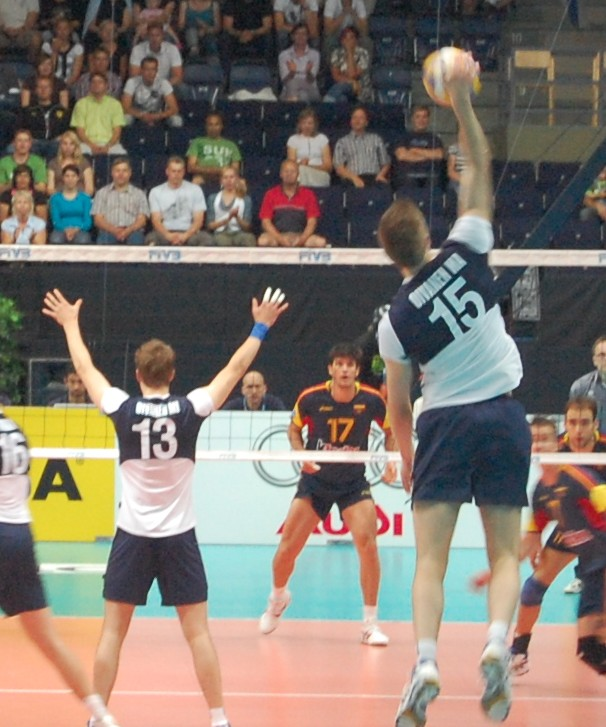
Matti Oivanen serving at the FIVB World League 2008

Oivanen's first game as a member of the Finland men's national volleyball team was against Germany in the summer of 2005. That year, Finland made it to the Men's European Volleyball League finals and won second place. During the 2007 Men's European Volleyball Championship, the Finland national team won fourth place.

== Achievements ==
Henkilökohtaiset:

- Finland league All-Stars player 2008
- Best server in the Finland league 2008
- Sport Channel All-Stars player Finland league 2008
- Best newcomer player in the Finland league 2004

Maajoukkueessa:

- European Championships 4. place 2007
- European league silver medal 2005

SM-liigassa:

- Finland league silver 2007, 2008
- Finland Cup Champion 2004, 2006–2007
