= Siltala =

Siltala is a Finnish surname. Notable people with the surname include:

- Juha Siltala (born 1957), Finnish historian
- Mike Siltala (born 1963), Canadian ice hockey player
- Antti Siltala (born 1984), Finnish volleyball player
