= Antti Siltala =

Finnish volleyball player (born 1984)

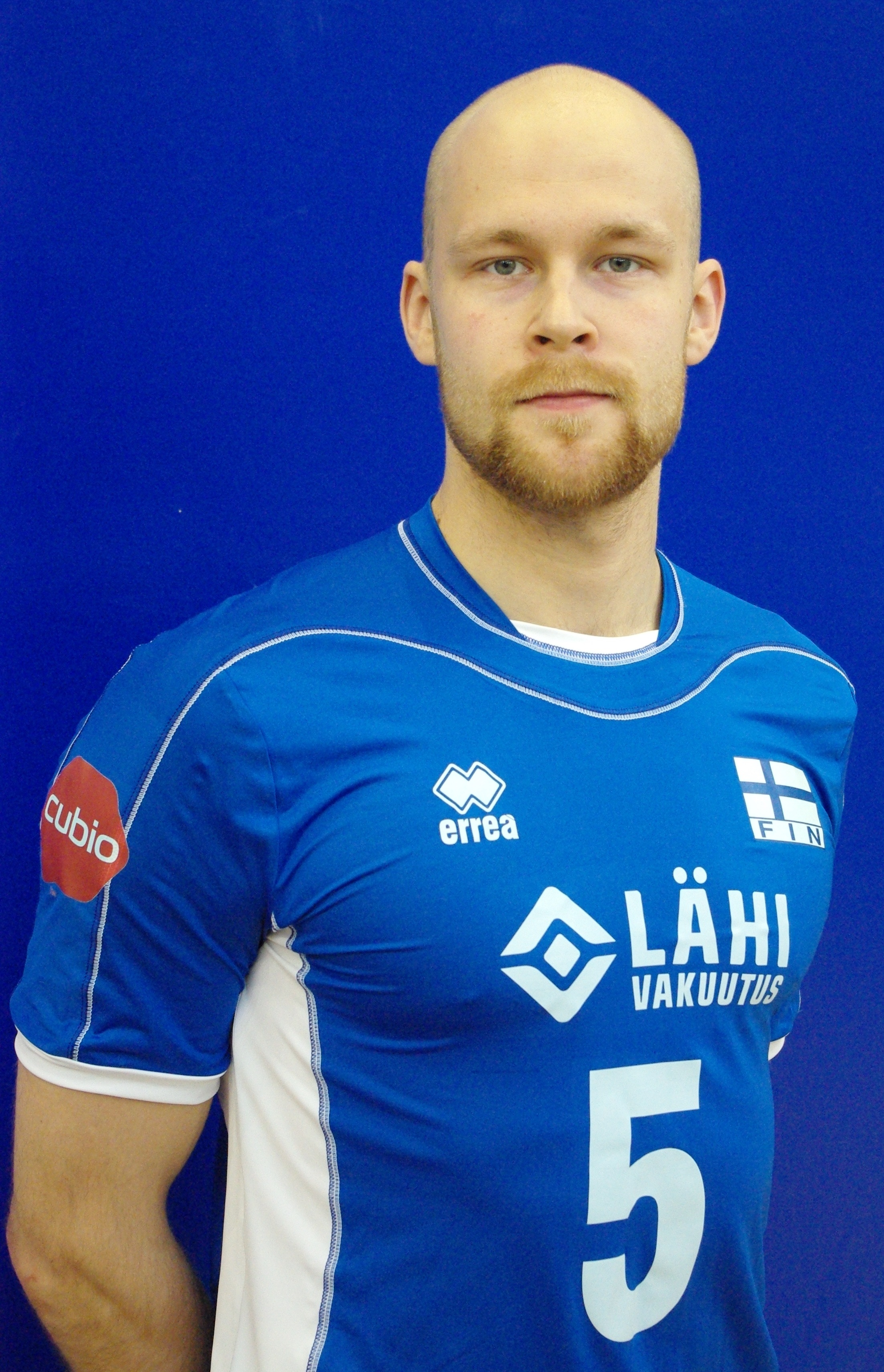

Personal information
- Nationality: Finnish
- Born: 14 March 1984 (age 42); Vieremä, Finland
- Height: 1.93 m (6 ft 4 in)
- Weight: 88 kg (194 lb)
- Spike: 348 cm (137 in)
- Block: 330 cm (130 in)

Volleyball information
- Position: Outside hitter
- Current club: Maliye Milli Piyango SK
- Number: 4

Career
Years	Teams
2001–2004; 2004–2005; 2005–2006; 2006–2007; 2007–2008; 2008–2009; 2009–2010; 2010–2012; 2012–2013; 2013–62014; 2014–2016; 2016–	Keski-Savon Pateri; Pielaveden Sampo; Chaumont VB 52; Pielaveden Sampo; Noliko Maaseik; Aris Thessaloniki; SGK Ankara; Delecta Bydgoszcz; Argos Sora; GFC Ajaccio VB; Yenisey Krasnoyarsk; Maliye Milli Piyango SK

National team
2013–	Finland
Honours
Men's volleyball
Representing Finland
European League
Silver medal – second place	2005 Russia
- Last updated: 29 December 2017

Antti Siltala (born 14 March 1984) is a Finnish professional volleyball player who has played in Greek, Turkish and Polish leagues. He also plays for the Finland men's national team.

== Career ==
=== Early career ===
Siltala moved to Kuortane at age 16 and started training with the Finland youth national team. After one year in Kuortane, he made a contract to the Finland league with Keski-Savon Pateri.

=== Keski-Savon Pateri ===
The first season in Keski-Savon Pateri was 2001. He played in Pateri during seasons 2001–2004. After that he made a contract with Pielaveden Sampo, which is one of the best teams in the Finland league.

=== Pielaveden Sampo ===
The first season was difficult with Pielaveden Sampo. Last season champion, Sampo played its historical worst season and dropped before the medal games. When half of the season was played, Pielaveden Sampo rented Siltala to the France pro league. He played the end season in the Chaumont team. The second season was good to Siltala and Sampo. They won the Finland Cup Champion and Finland league silver. After the season, the media chose Siltala to be on the Finland league All-Star team.

=== Noliko Maaseik ===
After the season, Siltala made a contract with Noliko Maaseik. In Noliko Maaseik he rose to starting line-up and played a good season. He won the Belgium league and Belgium cup. Also, he won CEV-Cup silver and Belgium Supercup silver. The season was a success to Siltala and Noliko Maaseik team.

=== Aris Thessaloniki ===
After one season in Noliko Maaseik, Siltala made a contract to the Greece league. There his new team was Aris Thessaloniki, where Finnish volleyball player Jukka Lehtonen also played.

== National team ==
Siltala first played for the Finland men's national volleyball team in 2005. He won with the team the same year that the European league silver lost in the final to Russia. He played at the 2007 European Championships and achieved Finland's best-ever result, fourth place. He has now played for Finland in more than 100 games.

== Achievements ==
Personal

- Finland league All-Star player 2006
- Finland league best server 2006
- Belgium league best server 2007
- Best Spiker in Belgium league 2007
- Mvp in Belgium league 2007
- Best Receivers in Greek Cup 2009
- Best Spiker in Greek Cup 2009
- Mvp in Turkey League 2009
- Best Receivers in Turkey League 2009
- Best Receivers in France League 2014
- Best server in France League 2014

Club

- CEV-Cup silver 2008
- Belgium Champion 2008
- Belgium Cup-win 2008
- Belgium SuperCup silver 2007
- Finland league silver 2006
- Finland Cup-win 2006

National team

- 4.place in European Championships 2007
