= Olli-Pekka Ojansivu =

Finnish volleyball player (born 1987)

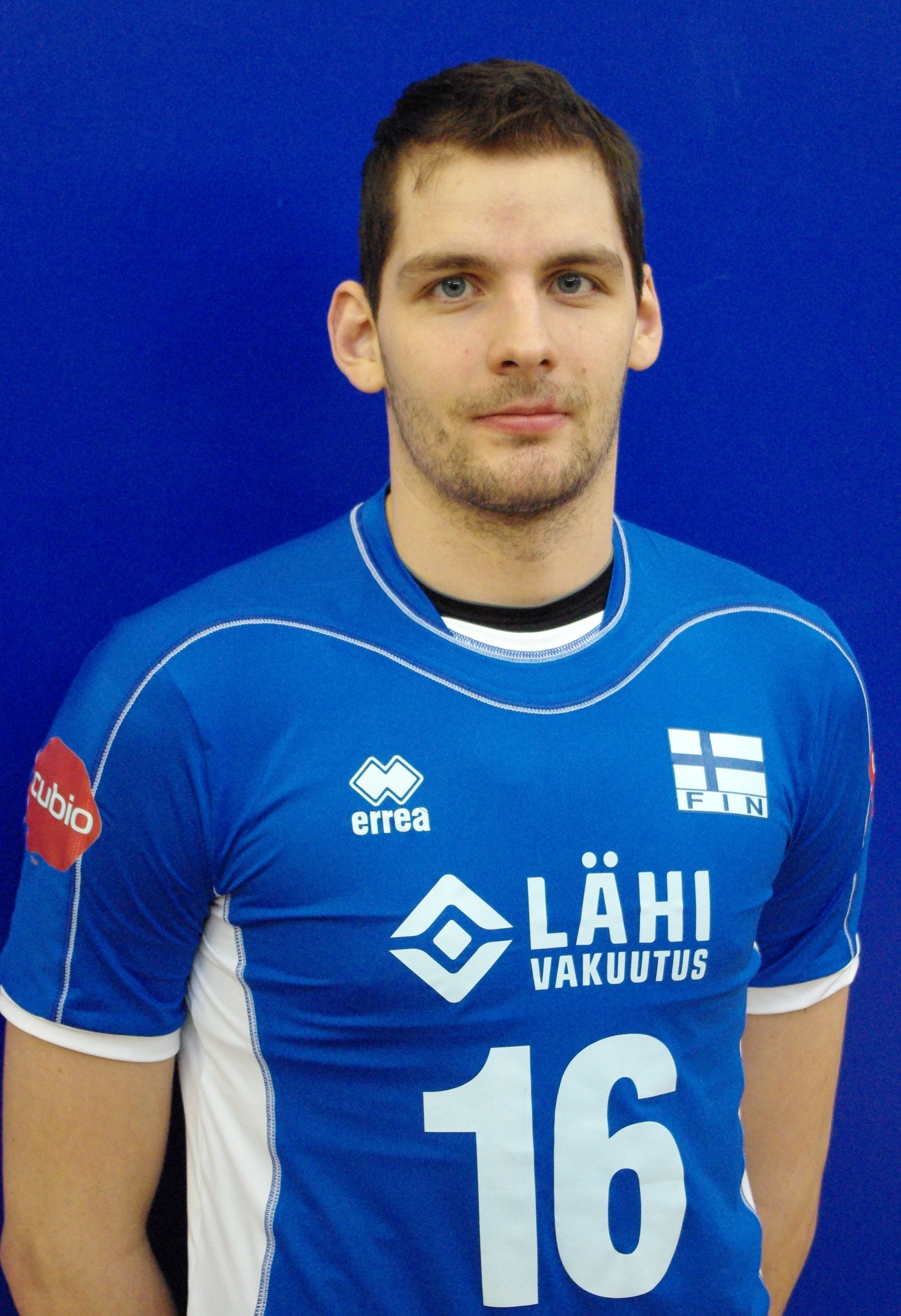

Personal information
- Nickname: Lelu
- Nationality: Finnish
- Born: 31 December 1987 (age 38); Kuopio, Finland
- Height: 1.96 m (6 ft 5 in)
- Weight: 90 kg (198 lb)
- Spike: 344 cm (135 in)
- Block: 325 cm (128 in)

Volleyball information
- Position: Opposite

Career
Years	Teams
2004–2007; 2007–2009; 2009–2010; 2010–2011; 2011; 2012; 2012–2013; 2013–2016; 2016–2017; 2017; 2017–2018; 2018–2022	Vammalan Lentopallo; Pielaveden Sampo; P.A.O.K. Thessaloniki; Spacer's de Toulouse; Sivas Belediyespor; Avtomobilist SPb; Tomis Constanța; Kokkolan Tiikerit; Shahrdari Urmia; Kuzbass Kemerovo; Afyon Belediye Yüntaş; Savo Volley

National team
2007–2017	Finland
- Last updated: 27 December 2021

Olli-Pekka "Lelu" Ojansivu (born 31 December 1987) is a retired Finnish professional volleyball player who was a member of the Finland men's national volleyball team.

== Career ==
Ojansivu started his career in Vammalan Lentopallo. When Ojansivu turned sixteen years old he didn't go to Kuortane like many promising junior players do. He stayed in Vammala and started training in Finnish league team Vammalan Lentopallo. He played his first game in Finnish Champion league at the age of 16 in season 2004. His first whole season in Finnish Champion league was season 2006. He was best server in the whole league and ranked fifth amongst spikers. After the season Finnish volleyball federation chose him as the best newcomer in the league. 2005 season in Vammala was also great and Ojansivu ranked as 2nd best server in the whole league and was again 5th best spiker in league.

After many seasons in Vammala Ojansivu made contract with Pielaveden Sampo. In Sampo Ojansivu won his first season Finland Cup-Champion and in Finland league silver medal. Sport Channel chose him best opposite player in whole league.

In the 2008–2009 season, he played in the Finland Champion league in Pielaveden Sampo.

He signed a contract with CVM Tomis Constanța in July 2012. The club will represent Romania in the CEV Champions League.

== National team ==
Ojansivu's national debut was against Estonia in Olympic Qualification in 2007. The score was 23–23 when Olli-Pekka was substituted to court. He managed to serve back-to-back aces and Finland won the set. Since that match Ojansivu has been part of the national team.

== Achievements ==
Personal

- 2005–2006 Valepa (Best server and 2nd. best scorer of the league
- Best rookie in Finland league 2006
- 2006–2007 Valepa (2nd. best server and 5th. best scorer of the league
- 2008–2009 Pielaveden Sampo (Best scorer in Play – off games
- Sport Channel best opposite player 2008
- 2009–2010 PAOK (3rd. best server and 2nd. best scorer of the league

Team

- Finland league champion 2009
- Finland Cup-Champion 2008, 2009
- Finland league silver 2008
