= Dawid Murek =

Polish volleyball player and coach (born 1977)

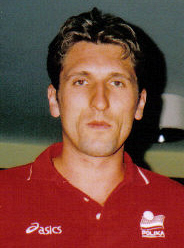

Personal information
- Born: 24 July 1977 (age 49); Międzyrzecz, Poland
- Height: 1.96 m (6 ft 5 in)

Coaching information
Previous teams coached
Years	Teams
2022–2023; 2024	Gwardia Wrocław; MKS Będzin

Volleyball information
- Position: Outside hitter

Career
Years	Teams
1991–1993; 1993–1996; 1996–2001; 2001–2005; 2005–2006; 2006–2008; 2008–2009; 2009–2014; 2014–2016; 2016–2018; 2018–2019	Piast Międzyrzecz; Orzeł Międzyrzecz; AZS Częstochowa; Panathinaikos; Modena Volley; Jastrzębski Węgiel; Skra Bełchatów; AZS Częstochowa; Transfer Bydgoszcz; Espadon Szczecin; AZS Częstochowa

National team
1996–2008	Poland (277)

Dawid Murek (born 24 July 1977) is a Polish professional volleyball coach and former player. He was a member of the Poland national team from 1996 to 2008, and a participant in the Olympic Games Athens 2004.

== Personal life ==
In 1999, he married Dorota. They have a daughter, Natalia (born 1999) who is also a professional volleyball player.

== Honours ==
=== Club ===
- CEV Challenge Cup
  - 2011–12 – with AZS Częstochowa
- Domestic
  - 1996–97 Polish Championship, with AZS Częstochowa
  - 1997–98 Polish Cup, with AZS Częstochowa
  - 1998–99 Polish Championship, with AZS Częstochowa
  - 2003–04 Greek Championship, with Panathinaikos
  - 2008–09 Polish Cup, with PGE Skra Bełchatów
  - 2008–09 Polish Championship, with PGE Skra Bełchatów

=== Youth national team ===
- 1996 CEV U20 European Championship
- 1997 FIVB U21 World Championship

=== Individual awards ===
- 2012: CEV Challenge Cup – Most valuable player

=== Statistics ===
- 2013–14 PlusLiga – Best receiver
