= Olli Kunnari =

Finnish volleyball player (born 1982)

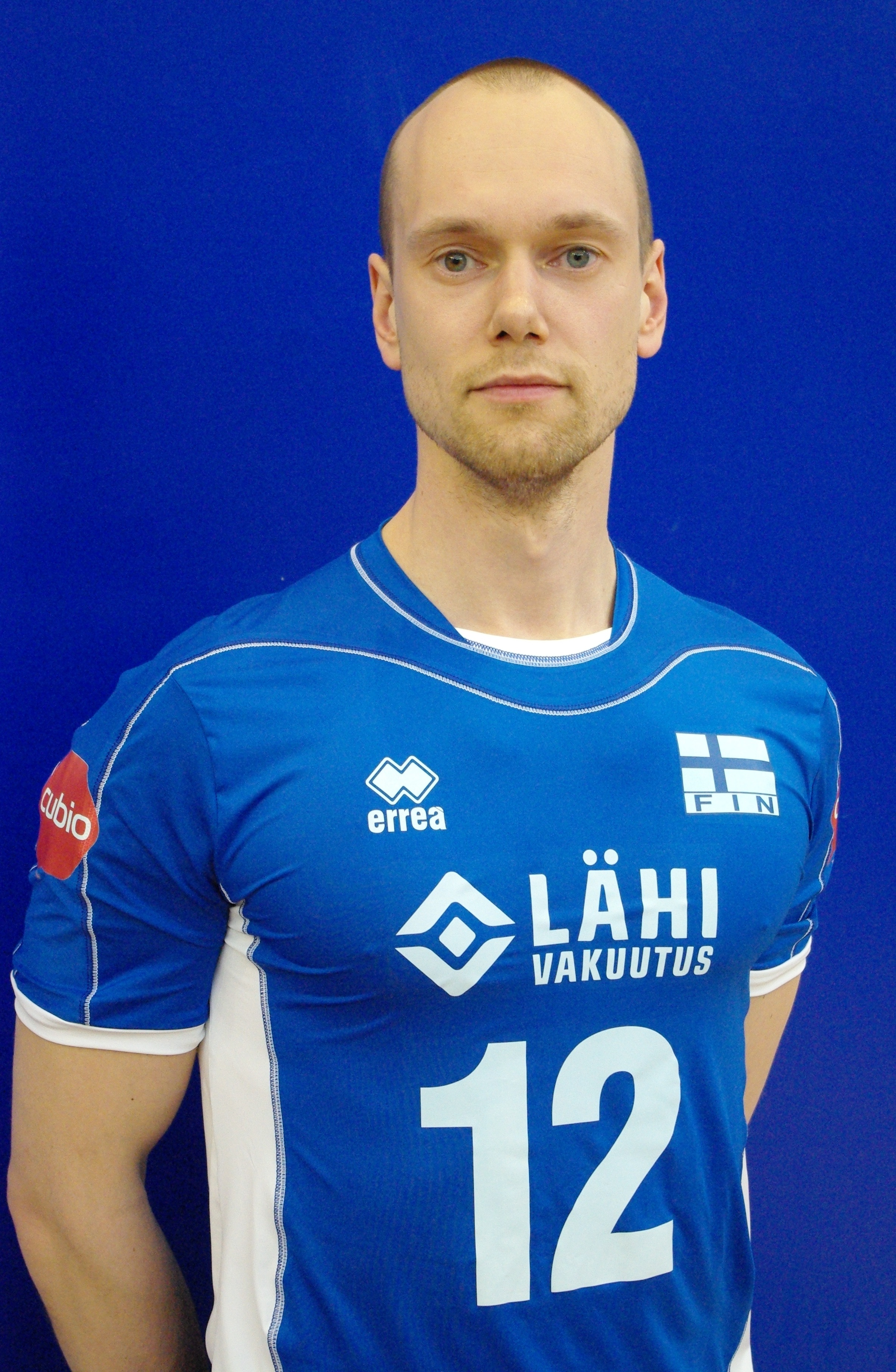

Personal information
- Full name: Olli Kunnari
- Born: 2 February 1982 (age 44); Alahärmä, Finland
- Height: 1.96 m (6 ft 5 in)

Volleyball information
- Position: Spiker
- Current club: Olympiacos Piraeus

Career
Years	Teams
2000–2002; 2002–2004; 2004–2006; 2007–2009	Vammalan Lentopallo; Pielaveden Sampo; Beauvois Volley; AS Cannes

National team
6 years	Finland

Olli Kunnari (born 2 February 1982) is a Finnish volleyball player. He is currently one of the key players in the Finnish national volleyball team. During the early years of his career, he played in the Finnish Champion league. In year 2004, he left Finland to play in the French Pro-A Volleyball league where he played until the season of 2009. Olli played the 2009 season in the Polish league. His current team Olympiacos SC, the volleyball team of the Greek sports club Olympiacos.

== Career ==
Kunnari started his volleyball career in his hometown Alahärmä. When Kunnari become seventeen years old he moved to Tampere and started to study in Varala sport highschool. After that he played his first game in Finland Champion league season 2000–2001. Team was Vammalan Lentopallo. He played in Vammala season 2000–2001 and 2001–2002 then he changed to a bigger team named Pielaveden Sampo. In Pielaveden Sampo Olli became star. He was his team's major player and win his first Finland Champion season 2003–2004. Before that he captured one bronze medal season 2003. Season 2004 Kunnari was chosen as best player in Finland league and also in Finland league All-Stars team.

After four seasons in Finland, Olli started his professional volleyball career in France, Pro A-league. His team was Beauvais where Olli became a major player. Olli played two seasons in Beauvais until he signed a contract with AS Cannes. In AS Cannes Kunnari he won in his first season the France Cup, and came in league 3. place. Next season AS Cannes he won again the France Cup and come in league 3. place. Media chose Olli too in season France Pro A-league All-Stars team.

After France Pro A -league Kunnari made contract with Polish league team Olsztyn. There he played one season before he changed to Olympiakos team in Greece.

== National team ==
Olli Kunnari has played over 130 national team games. He is team major player with Mikko Esko and Tuomas Sammelvuo. In the European Championships 2007 Finland's national team came in 4. place and Olli played arguably the best volleyball of his career. He was the third best server in competition and second best receiver in the competition.

== Achievements ==
Personal:

- All-Stars player in Polish league 2009
- France league All-Stars player 2008
- Best player in Finland league 2004
- All-Stars player in Finland league 2004

Team:

- 4. place in European Championship 2007
- France league bronze medal 2007, 2008
- France Cup win 2007
- Finland Champion 2004, 2012
- Finland league 3. place 2003
- Greece Cup-silver 2009
- Greece volleyball league champion 2010

== Teams ==
- 2000–01: Vammalan Lentopallo
- 2001–02: Vammalan Lentopallo
- 2002–03: Pielaveden Sampo
- 2003–04: Pielaveden Sampo
- 2004–05: Beauvais
- 2005–06: Beauvais
- 2006–07: AS Cannes
- 2007–08: AS Cannes
- 2008–09: AZS Olsztyn
- 2009–10: Olympiacos Piraeus
- 2011–19: Vammalan Lentopallo
