= Michał Kamiński (volleyball) =

Polish volleyball player (born 1987)

Personal information
- Full name: Michał Kamiński
- Nationality: Polish
- Born: 17 May 1987 (age 39)
- Hometown: Krzanowice, Poland
- Height: 2.10 m (6 ft 11 in)
- Weight: 112 kg (247 lb)
- Spike: 353 cm (139 in)
- Block: 332 cm (131 in)

Volleyball information
- Position: Opposite
- Current club: MKS Będzin

Career
Years	Teams
2011–2012; 2012–2013; 2013–2014; 2014–2014; 2014–2015; 2015–	KS AZS Rafako Racibórz; SMS PZPS Spała; Jastrzębski Węgiel; GTPS Gorzów Wielkopolski; Martigues Volley-Ball; AZS Częstochowa; Lotos Trefl Gdańsk; AZS Częstochowa; Panathinaikos Athens; Aris Thessaloniki; MKS Będzin

National team
Poland
- Last updated: 6 February 2017

Michał Kamiński (born 17 May 1987) is a Polish volleyball player, a member of Poland men's national volleyball team and Polish club MKS Będzin.

== Career ==
=== Clubs ===
In 2007 he achieved silver medal of Polish Championship with Jastrzębski Węgiel. In 2012 AZS Częstochowa, including Kamiński, won CEV Challenge Cup after final with AZS Politechnika Warszawska (3-2).

== Sporting achievements ==
=== Clubs ===
==== CEV Challenge Cup ====
- 2011/2012 - with AZS Czestochowa

==== National championships ====
- 2006/2007 Polish Championship, with Jastrzębski Węgiel

=== National team ===
- 2005 CEV U19 European Championship
