= Raadik =

Family name

Raadik is an Estonian surname. Notable people the surname include:

- Andrus Raadik, Estonian volleyball player
- Anton Raadik, Estonian middleweight boxer
- Pille Raadik, Estonian soccer player
- Rain Raadik, Estonian professional basketball player
- Toomas Raadik, Estonian professional basketball player
