= Mikko Oivanen =

Finnish volleyball player (born 1986)

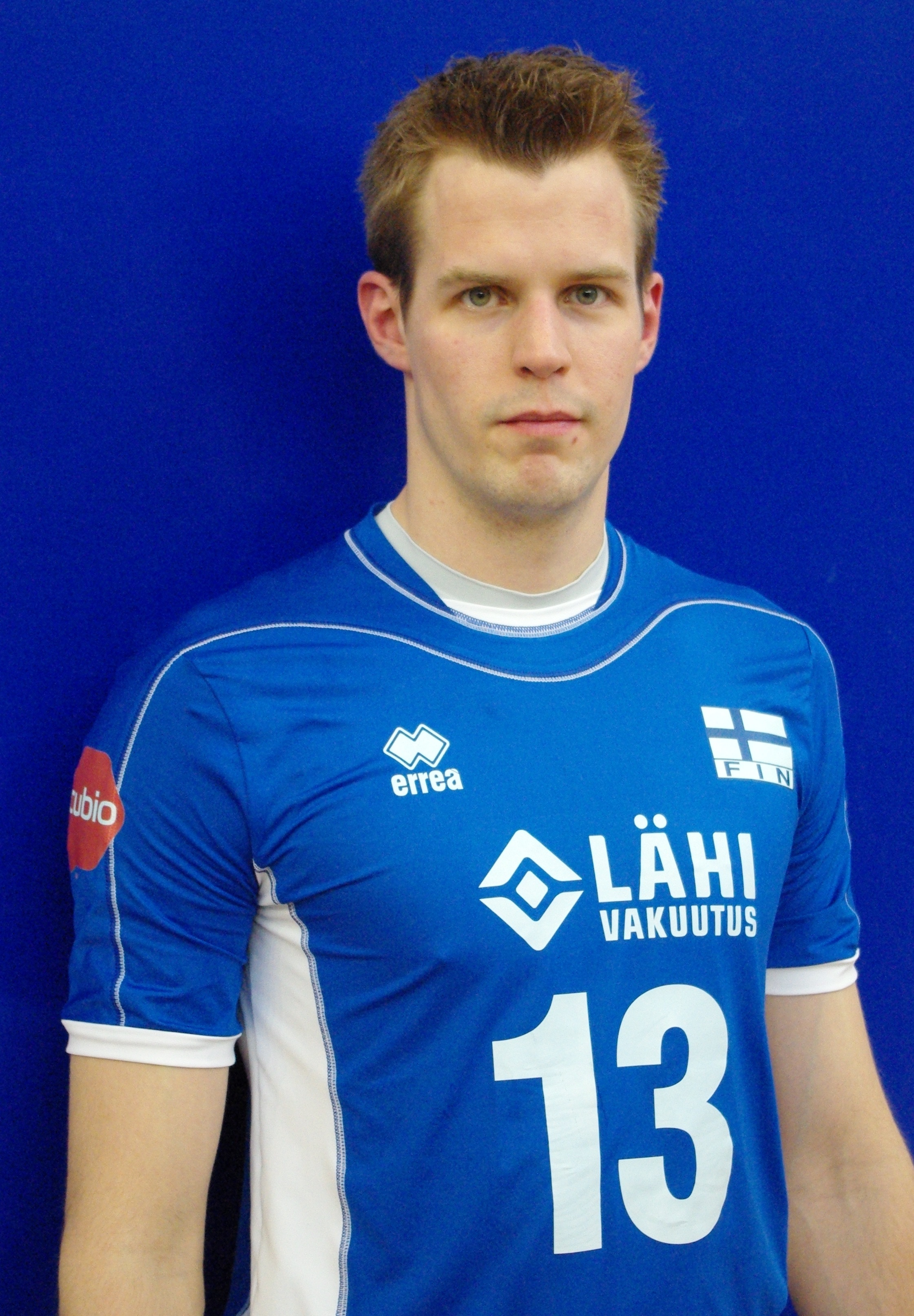

Personal information
- Full name: Mikko Oivanen
- Nationality: Finnish
- Born: 26 May 1986 (age 40); Huittinen, Finland
- Height: 1.98 m (6 ft 6 in)
- Weight: 92 kg (203 lb)
- Spike: 355 cm (140 in)
- Block: 335 cm (132 in)

Volleyball information
- Position: Opposite hitter
- Current team: Police S.C. Doha
- Number: 4

Career
Years	Teams
2001–2002; 2002–2003; 2003–2004; 2004–2006; 2006–2007; 2007–2008; 2008–2010; 2010–2011; 2011–2012; 2012; 2012–2013; 2013–2014; 2014; 2014–2015; 2015–2016; 2016; 2016–2017; 2017–2018; 2018–	Kiikoisten Kirma; Kuortane; Vammalan Lentopallo; Raision Loimu; Rovaniemen Santasport; İstanbul Büyükşehir Belediyesi; Asseco Resovia Rzeszów; İstanbul Büyükşehir Belediyesi; Lotos Trefl Gdańsk; Hurrikaani Loimaa; Paris Volley; Fujian Volleyball; VaLePa Sastamala; Cerrad Czarni Radom; Paykan Tehran VC; Indykpol AZS Olsztyn; Hurrikaani Loimaa; Olympiacos S.F. Piraeus; Police S.C. Doha

National team
2005–	Finland
Honours
Men's volleyball
Representing Finland
European League
Silver medal – second place	2005 Russia
- Last updated: 19 February 2019

Mikko Oivanen (born 26 May 1986) is a Finnish volleyball player, a member of Finland men's national volleyball team.

== Personal life ==
Mikko has a twin brother – Matti Oivanen, who is also a volleyball player.

== Career ==
=== Clubs ===
Oivanen started his career with his brother Matti in Kiikoisten Kirma. Soon Finnish youth national team's coach picks him to youth national team. Mikko moved with his brother to Kuortane and started studying in local high school. Same time he trained with youth national team. On his last high school year Mikko played few games with his brother Matti in Vammalan Lentopallo that is competing in Finnish champion league. In 2004 he graduated from Kuortane. After Kuortane Oivanen made a contract with Raision Loimu which plays in Finland Championleague. He started playing there with his brother Matti. In his first season in Loimu Oivanen didn't get much minutes because Loimu's opposite player at the time was Argentinian Diego Bonini. In his first season in Finland league he won Finland Cup champion and was in the league fourth place. Second season in Loimu was good to Mikko. He rose to Loimu's number one opposite player and led his team to Finland Cup final again. In final Loimu lost to Napapiirin Palloketut. After two seasons in Loimu Oivanen made a contract with Rovaniemen Santasport. His brother Matti made a contract with Pielaveden Sampo so it was a first season without Matti. In Santasport Mikko led his team to European Cup best sixteen. In Finland league he led the team to finals against Pielaveden Sampo. Mikko played for the first time against his brother Matti. Finals were very exciting matches. Finals culminated to last fifth game in Kuopio. Full crowd saw fifth set game and Santasport took gold. Mikko get his first big victory.
After good a season, Mikko made contract to Turkish volleyball league with Kastamonu Bozkurt Belediyespor. After European Championships, Mikko's price rise over a million euros. Many bigger clubs than Kastamonu Bozkurt Belediyesi wanted Mikko, but Kastamonu Bozkurt Belediyesi didn't want to lose their star. Mikko stayed in Kastamonu Bozkurt Belediyesi. He played a good season and led a small club to sixth place in Turkish league. After one season in Turkey, Oivanen made a contract with Asseco Resovia Rzeszów. He won silver medal of Polish Championship 2009 and bronze medal of Polish Championship 2010. Then came back to Turkish club – Büyükşehir Belediyesi. After one season, he spent next seasons in Lotos Trefl Gdańsk, Paris Volley, Fujian. In 2014 trained with VaLePa Sastamala in Finland. Till the end of 2014–15 season, he had been playing for Polish club – Cerrad Czarni Radom. Next season he tried himself in Persian Paykan Tehran VC, he returned for a few months in Poland, playing with Indykpol AZS Olsztyn, but he finished the season back at home with the Finnish Hurrikaani Loimaa. In the summer of 2017 Mikko Oivanen made a contract with Greek powerhouse Olympiacos Piraeus. With the Pirsus club Oivanen won his first titles outside Finland; the Hellenic League Cup, and the Hellenic Championship. He also won the Silver medal of the 2017–18 edition of CEV Challenge Cup, helping a lot Olympiacos to their tremendous course to the final of the competition.

=== National team ===
Oivanen played his first national team game in season 2005 against Germany on European league. Finland survived to European League finals and the media chose Mikko as a best attacker. Young Finland team won a silver medal in the tournament. Oivanen made his breakthrough to the national team World league summer 2007. Finland's number one opposite player Matti Hietanen was hurt and Mikko got a chance to show his talent. He played a good World League summer and was the fourth best scorer in the whole league. After World League summer national team started training for European Championships in Moscow. There Mikko became one of the best opposite players of the world. He was the best scorer in the tournament and led Finland to its best ballgame achievement.

== Sporting achievements ==
=== National team ===
- 2005 European League

=== Clubs ===
==== International competitions ====
- 2018 Men's CEV Challenge Cup, with Olympiacos Piraeus

==== National championships ====
- 2003/2004 Finnish Cup, with Vammalan Lentopallo
- 2005/2006 Finnish Cup, with Raision Loimu
- 2006/2007 Finnish Championship, with Rovaniemi Santasport
- 2017/2018 Greek Championship, with Olympiacos Piraeus
- 2017/2018 Greek League Cup, with Olympiacos Piraeus
- 2018/2019 Qatar Championship, with Police SC
- 2019/2020 Finnish Cup, with Vammalan Lentopallo

=== Individually ===
- 2005 European League – Best Spiker
- 2005 European League – Best Scorer
- 2017 Finnish Championship – Best Server
- 2017 Finnish Championship – Best Opposite
- 2017 Finnish Cup – Best Opposite
- 2020 Finnish Cup – Best Opposite
- 2020 Finnish Cup – Best Server
- 2020 Finnish Cup – Best Scorer

Awards
Preceded by (Czech Republic) Martin Lébl	Best Spiker of European League; 2005	Succeeded by (Netherlands) Michael Olieman
Preceded by (Croatia) Igor Omrčen	Best Scorer of European League; 2005	Succeeded by (Netherlands) Marko Klok
