= Salon Piivolley =

Piivolley
- Full name: Salon Piivolley
- Founded: 1999
- Ground: Salohalli; Salo, Finland
- Capacity: 2000
- Chairman: (Finland) Martti Ojamo
- Head Coach: (Finland) Ismo Tuovinen
- League: Finland Champion League
- 2007-08: SM-league, 6th place

Salon Piivolley is a Finnish volleyball team from Salo, Finland. It was founded in 1999. The team plays in the Finland volleyball league.

== History ==
Two volleyball clubs, Perttelin Peikot and Salon Piivolley, decided to join their clubs and create a new club. The resulting club was named Salon Piivolley. Piivolley continued in the Finland volleyball league in Perttelin Peikot's place. During the 2001 season, the team won bronze in the league, and in the 2003 season it won the Finland Cup Championship. The club advanced to league finals three times during the 2004-2006 seasons, but lost every final game. In the Finland Cup, the team advanced to the cup finals during 2004, 2006 and 2007. Once there, however, they lost to Pielaveden Sampo in 2006 and 2007 and to Raision Loimu in 2004.

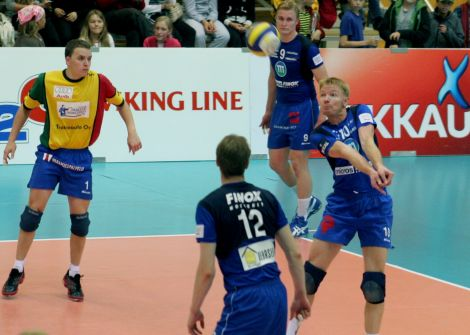
Season 2008 game

== Notable players ==
- Olli Aakula
- Gabor Janosi
- Matti Hietanen
- Sami Heikkiniemi
- Kert Toobal
- Jussi Niemelä

== Other ==
During the 2003 season the team was caught up in a doping scandal when one team player was caught using performance enhancers. However, the player acted alone and the team had no knowledge of his activities. The player was banned from play for two years.
