= Jukka Lehtonen =

Finnish volleyball player and coach (born 1982)

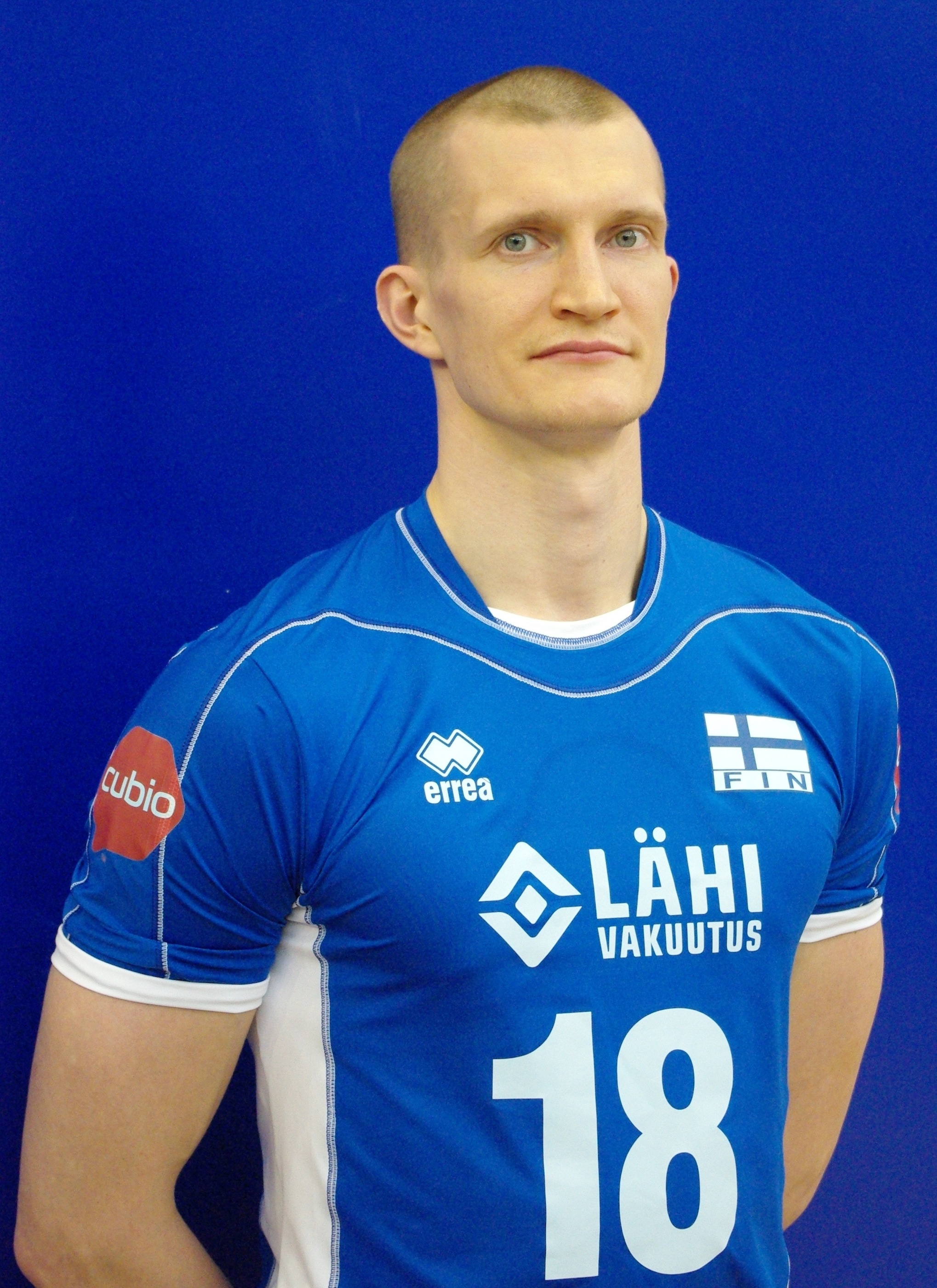

Personal information
- Full name: Jukka Lehtonen
- Born: 22 February 1982 (age 44) Savonlinna, Finland
- Height: 1.97 m (6 ft 6 in)

Volleyball information
- Position: Middle-blocker
- Current club: GFCO Ajaccio

Career
- Years: Team
- 2001–2004 2004–2006 2006–2008 2008–2009 2009–2010 2010–2011: Savonlinnan East Volley; Napapiirin Palloketut; Rovaniemen Santasport; Aris Thessaloniki; Marcegaglia Ravenna; GFCO Ajaccio

National team
- Years: Team
- 3 years: Finland

Jukka Lehtonen (born 22 February 1982) is a Finnish professional volleyball player and coach. He was also the captain of Finland men's national volleyball team.

== Career ==
=== Early career ===
Lehtonen started his volleyball career in Rantasalmen Urheilijat year 1989. Ten years after that he played on fourth highest level in Finland. Two years after that he made contract Bad Saulgau team. He moved to Germany and started play their second highest level.

=== East Volley ===
After one year in Germany he came back to Finland and started playing in Savonlinnan East Volley which played Finland volleyball league. He was two times with East Volley in medalgames, but when East Volley got many problems he changed to Napapiirin Palloketut.

=== Palloketut ===
Season 2004–2006 Lehtonen played in Napapiirin Palloketut, Rovaniemi. He won season 2005 with team Finland Cup Champion. Media chose him to season 2005–2006 All-Stars team. After two season in Napapiirin Palloketut Lehtonen made contract with new club named Rovaniemen Santasport.

=== Santasport ===
First season was success to Lehtonen in Santasport. He won Finland league Champion first time on his career. Santasport played too good games in European league. After season media chose Lehtonen again to All-Stars team. Second season was too good to Lehtonen and his team. Lehtonen got his second Finland Champion after very exciting finals. Media chose Lehtonen third time to All-Stars team.

=== Aris Thessalonik ===
After season 2008 Lehtonen made contract with Aris Thessaloniki which play in Greece Volleyball league.

=== As a coach ===
Jukka Lehtonen is a Finnish volleyball coach with extensive experience across both Finland and Sweden. He is currently serving as the head coach of Women Arctic Volley (Finland) spanning from the 2023/24 to 2025/26 seasons. He also served as head coach for Women Sweden in 2023 and coached Sollentuna VK (Sweden) during the 2022/23 season. Prior to these roles, he was an assistant coach for the Sweden women's team in 2022–2023, and has also held positions as head coach and assistant coach for various teams, including Puijo Wolley (Finland), where he worked with both the senior women's team and the U21 squad from 2018 to 2022. Additionally, he was an assistant coach at Maaningan Mahti (Finland) in 2018.

== National team ==
Jukka Lehtonen was admitted to the national team in 2006. Lehtonen played his first national team match against Canada in FIVB World league, and had 61 total appearances in the National Team. Since Tuomas Sammelvuo retired from the Finnish National Team, he has been the captain of the team.

== Achievements ==
=== Personal ===
- Finland league All-Stars team 2006, 2007, 2008
- Sport Channel All-Stars team 2008
- Best blocker in Finland league 2007, 2008
- Play-off best blocker 2008
- Hotsport.info All-Stars team 2008

=== Team ===
- Finland Champion 2007, 2008
- Finland Cup Champion 2005
- Swiss Champion 2013
- Swiss Cup Champion 2013

== Teams ==
- 2001–2004 Savonlinnan East Volley
- 2004–2006 Napapiirin Palloketut
- 2006–2008 Rovaniemen Santasport
- 2008–2009 Aris Thessalonik
- 2009–2010 ITA Marcegaglia Ravenna
- 2010–2011 GFCO Ajaccio
- 2011–2012 Città di Castello A2 Italy
- 2012–2013 EN Gas & Oil Lugano
- 2013–2014 Energy Investments Lugano
