= Tampereen Isku-Volley =

Isku-Volley
- Full name: Tampereen Isku-Volley
- Founded: 1911
- Ground: Pyynikin Palloiluhalli; Tampere, Finland
- Capacity: 1300
- Chairman: Kari Kallio
- League: SM-liiga
- 2007-2008: SM-liiga 4th place

Tampereen Isku-Volley is a volleyball team from Finland. It is based in Tampere. The team was founded in 1911, originally known as Rantaperkiön Isku, the name changed to Tampereen Isku-Volley at the beginning of the 1990s.

== Achievements ==
- 6 Finland Champion
- 8 Finland league silver
- 6 Finland league bronze
- 3 Finland Cup champion

== History ==
Isku-Volley is the Finnish volleyball league's oldest team. It has played in the league over thirteen year. The team has participated in over nine hundred matches, the biggest reading of Finnish teams ever. The club has six Finland Championships, eight silver, and six bronze medal. Finland Cup team has won third times. Last Finland league Champion was the 2005–2006 season.

== Team ==
=== Season 2008-2009 ===
Setters:

- 3. (United States) Chris Tamas
- 5. (Finland) Ossi Heino

Middle-blockerst:

- 2. (Finland) Anssi Vesanen
- 4. (Finland) Ossi Vesanen
- 8. (Finland) Sauli Sinkkonen
- 13. (Finland) Sauli Silpo

Wing-spikers:

- 6. (Finland) Tuomas Tihinen
- 14. (Finland) Joni Mikkonen

Opposite:

- (United States) Ryan Jay Owens

Libero:

- 2. (Finland) Tapio Kangasniemi

== Famous players ==
- Sami Juvonen
- Mika Pyrhönen
- Matti Ollikainen
- Tapio Kangasniemi
- Jussi Heino
- Tuomas Tihinen
- Anssi Vesanen
- Kenneth Aro
