= Hypo Tirol Innsbruck =

- Full name: Hypo Tirol Innsbruck
- Founded: 1997; 29 years ago
- Dissolved: 2025; 1 year ago
- Manager: Lorenzo Tubertini
- League: Austrian Volley League
- 2023-2024: 1st
- Website: Club home page
- Championships: 2005, 2006, 2009, 2010, 2011, 2012, 2014, 2015, 2016, 2017, 2023, 2024

Hypo Tirol Innsbruck was a professional volleyball team based in Innsbruck, Austria. It played in the Austrian Volley League, until its dissolution in the 2024/25 season.

== 2024–25 Team ==
N°	Name	Position	Date of Birth	Nationality
4	Adam Provazeńik	S	07.04.2000	Czech Republic
11	Robert Viiber	S	31.01.1997	Estonia
2	Laurin Alberecht	O	26.01.2006	Austria
3	Przemysław Kupka	O	09.03.2001	Poland
3	Matêj Šmídl	O	25.02.1997	Czech Republic
17	Danail Dimov	O	24.03.2003	Bulgaria
6	Michael Ladner	OH	21.06.1998	Latvia
7	Arthur Nath	OH	30.10.1999	Brazil
10	Luis Gavan	OH	27.12.2008	Latvia
13	Kyle Hobus	OH	01.01.2000	United States
15	Niklas Kronthaler	OH	14.05.1994	Latvia
1	Pedro Henrique Frances	MB	30.06.1989	Brazil
8	Kyle Paulson	MB	30.04.2002	United States
9	Nicolai Grabmüller	MB	18.04.1996	Latvia
14	Jacob Kitzinger	L	21.08.2003	Latvia

== Honours ==
- Austrian Volley League: 2005, 2006, 2009, 2010, 2011, 2012, 2014, 2015, 2016, 2017, 2023, 2024
- MEVZA League: 2009, 2012, 2015
