= Perungan Pojat =

Team Lakkapää
- Full name: Team Lakkapää
- Ground: Lapin Urheiluopisto; Rovaniemi, Finland
- Capacity: 3000
- Chairman: (Finland) Kari Tapio
- League: Finland volleyball league
- 2008-09: SM-league, Silver

Team Lakkapää (formerly Perungan Pojat and Rovaniemen Santasport) is a professional volleyball team from Rovaniemi, Finland. The team played three seasons in Finland volleyball league, the country's highest level. They won two league championships in 2007 and 2008.

== Achievements ==
- Finland Champion 2007, 2008, 2011
- Finland Cup Champion 2010
- Top-teams cup quarter finals
- Challenge Cup quarter finals

== History ==
Rovaniemen Santasport was founded in 2006 when volleyball teams Perungan Pojat and Napapiirin Palloketut combined. In its first season, the team became Finland league Champion. After that, the teams split up. Perungan Pojat became Santasport. In 2008 Santasport won the Championship again. Santasport won silver in the last season they played in Finnish volleyball league, the 2008–09 season. After that season, the club's name changed to Perungan Pojat once again.

Eventually they became Team Lakkapää.

== Team ==
Setters:

- 1. Jani Sippola
- 5. Kalle Määttä

Middle-blockers

- 3. Antti Ylitalo
- 8. Viktors Korzenevics

Wing-spikers

- 4. Normunds Veinbergs
- 10. Robert Seppänen
- 13. Aki Mikkola
- 14. Pekka Sairanen

Opposites:

- 7. Joona Manninen
- 6. Steve Klosterman
- 9. Janne Kangaskokko

== Notables ==
- Mikko Oivanen
- Normunds Veinbergs
- Ugis Krastins
- Jukka Lehtonen
