= Hurrikaani Loimaa =

Finnish volleyball team

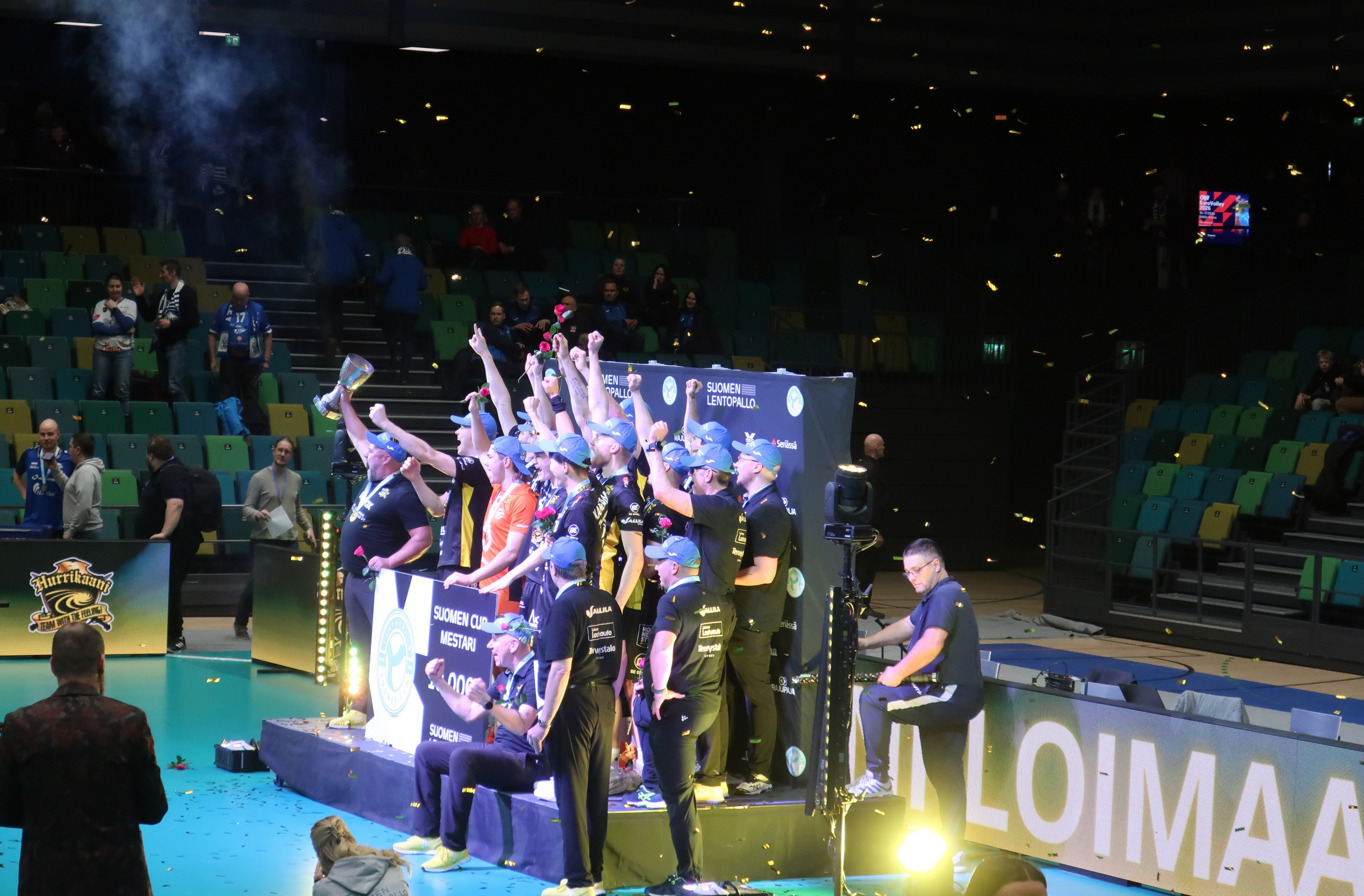
Hurrikaani Loimaa won the men's volleyball Finnish Cup in January 2026

Hurrikaani Loimaa is a Finnish volleyball team located in Loimaa. The team plays at the highest level in the country, the Finnish Volleyball Champions League.

== History ==
Hurrikaani Loimaa moved up to the top Finnish Volleyball Champions League in 2007. The team won their first championship at the end of the 2024 season.

Hurrikaani Loimaa secured their second championship during the 2026 season.
