= C.V.M. Tomis Constanța =

Romanian volleyball club

- Full name: Club Volei Municipal Tomis Constanța
- Short name: C.V.M. Tomis; Tomis Constanța
- Founded: 1996
- Ground: Sala Sporturilor (Capacity: 2,000)
- Chairman: Sorin Gabriel Strutinsky
- Manager: Martin Stoev
- League: Divizia A1
- 2013-14: 1st
- Website: Club home page

Uniforms
Home	Away

Club Volei Municipal Tomis Constanța, also known as C.V.M. Tomis Constanța, C.V.M. Tomis or Tomis Constanța, is a Romanian volleyball club based in Constanța. It plays in the 2014–15 CEV Champions League season. Tomis is ranked 14th (as of October 2016) in the Men's European clubs ranking.

== Results ==
- Divizia A1:
  - Gold: 2007, 2008, 2009, 2013, 2014, 2015
- Cupa României:
  - Winners: 2005, 2006, 2007, 2008, 2009, 2010, 2013, 2014
- CEV Cup:
  - Semifinalists: 2014
- Challenge Cup:
  - Bronze: 2009
  - Semifinalists: 2012

== Previous names ==
- 1996-2002: CSS 1 Midia Năvodari
- 2002-2005: Volei Club Municipal Constanța
- 2005–Present: Club Volei Municipal Tomis Constanța

== Team ==
=== Current squad ===
As of 5 November 2014

- 1 (Bulgaria) Stanislav Petkov
- 2 (Romania) Robert Vologa
- 4 (Serbia) Bojan Janić
- 5 (Romania) Sergiu Stancu
- 6 (Bulgaria) Andrey Zhekov
- 7 (Romania) Răzvan Tănăsescu
- 8 (Romania) Dragoș Pavel
- 10 (Romania) Andrei Stoian
- 11 (Romania) Andrei Spînu
- 13 (Italy) Vencislav Simeonov
- 15 (Romania) Adrian Aciobăniței
- 17 (Serbia) Nikola Rosić
- 18 (Romania) Andrei Laza

=== Staff members ===
- (Romania) President: Sorin Gabriel Strutinsky
- (Romania) Vice president: Eduard Martin
- (Romania) Executive director: Serhan Cadâr
- (Romania) Team manager: Bulent Cadâr
- (Bulgaria) Head Coach: Martin Stoev
- (Romania) Assistant Coach: Radu Began
- (Romania) Physiotherapist: Alexandru Negraru
- (Romania) Statistics: Marius Pop

== See also ==
- C.S. Volei 2004 Tomis Constanța (women's team)
- Romania men's national volleyball team
