= Finland Volleyball League =

Finnish volleyball league

- Founded: 1994
- Country: Finland
- Confederation: CEV
- Number of clubs: 9
- Level on pyramid: 1
- Relegation to: 1-sarja
- Current champions: Hurrikaani Loimaa
- Most championships: KuPS- Volley (8 titles)
- Website: mestaruusliiga.fi

The Finland Volleyball League (Finnish: Lentopallon Mestaruusliiga) is the highest level of men's volleyball in Finland. There are 9 teams in the league. The reigning champions are Hurrikaani Loimaa.

== History ==
The Finland Volleyball League was founded in 1994. Before then, teams play league in the Champion League. In 2010, the league changed its name to Mestaruusliiga. Two teams are tied for the most Finnish championships; KuPS-Volley from Kuopio and VaLePa from Sastamala both have 8 titles. The longest tenured team is Raision Loimu, with the 26/27 season being their 50th consecutive season in the top flight.

== Schedule ==
Each team plays each other team in the league four times —two games at home and two away. At the conclusion of the regular season, the teams ranked from 1–8 play in a playoff to determine the league champion. Last placed team (9th) will play a series against the champion of 1-sarja (second division) for a spot in the league for next season.

== Teams 2026/2027 ==
Name	City
Savo Volley	Kuopio
Akaa Volley	Akaa
Vammalan Lentopallo	Sastamala
Kokkolan Tiikerit	Kokkola
AC Oulu Volley	Oulu
TUTO Volley	Turku
Raision Loimu	Raisio
Hurrikaani Loimaa	Loimaa
Kyyjärven Kyky	Kyyjärvi

== Champions and medalists ==
Year	Champion	Silver	Bronze
1957	Porin Pyrintö	Helsingin Tarmo	Järvensivun Kisa, Tampere
1958	Järvensivun Kisa	Helsingin Tarmo	Porin Pyrintö
1959	Järvensivun Kisa	Helsingin Tarmo	Kimmo, Lahti
1960	Kimmo	Järvensivun Kisa	Helsingin Tarmo
1961	Järvensivun Kisa	Koiton Riento, Helsinki	Kimmo
1962	Kimmo	Rantaperkiön Isku, Tampere	Koiton Riento
1963	Rantaperkiön Isku	Kimmo	Koiton Riento
1964	Kimmo	Käpylän Lentopalloilijat, Helsinki	Johanneksen Pojat, Helsinki
1965	Käpylän Lentopalloilijat	Kimmo	Johanneksen Pojat
1966	Käpylän Lentopalloilijat	Johanneksen Pojat	Kimmo
1967	Johanneksen Pojat	Kimmo	Luolajan Kajastus, Hämeenlinna
1968	Johanneksen Pojat	Luolajan Kajastus	Pirkkalan Viri
1969	Luolajan Kajastus	Kuopion NMKYU	Kimmo
1970	Luolajan Kajastus	Johanneksen Pojat	Rateko, Kotka
1971	Luolajan Kajastus	Rateko	Kuopion NMKYU
1972	Luolajan Kajastus	Kuopion NMKYU	Rateko
1973	Rateko	Luolajan Kajastus	Kuopion NMKYU
1974	Rateko	Luolajan Kajastus	Sale, Kuopio
1975	Pieksämäen NMKY	Vammalan Kisa	Luolajan Kajastus
1976	Pieksämäen NMKY	Vammalan Kisa	Lautta- Pojat, Helsinki
1977	Pieksämäen NMKY	Lautta- Pojat	Vammalan Kisa
1978	Pieksämäen NMKY	Kimmo	Raision Loimu
1979	Pieksämäen NMKY	Kimmo	Raision Loimu
1980	Pieksämäen NMKY	Raision Loimu -79	Porin Pyrintö
1981	Pieksämäen NMKY	Raision Loimu -79	Rantaperkiön Isku
1982	Raision Loimu -79	Pieksämäen NMKY	Salon Viesti
1983	Loimu -79	Pieksämäen NMKY	Salon Viesti
1984	Loimu -79	Hesa, Helsinki	Rantaperkiön Isku
1985	Hesa	Pieksämäen NMKY	Loimu -79
1986	Seinäjoen Maila-Jussit	Pieksämäen NMKY	Hesa
1987	Seinäjoen Maila-Jussit	Varkauden Tarmo	Loimu -79
1988	Rantaperkiön Isku	Varkauden Tarmo	KuPS-Volley, Kuopio
1989	Varkauden Tarmo	Rantaperkiön Isku	KuPS-Volley
1990	Raision Loimu	Varkauden Tarmo	Etelä-Kuopion Ilves
1991	KuPS-Volley	Varkauden Tarmo	Tampereen Isku-Volley
1992	KuPS-Volley	Tampereen Isku-Volley	Vammalan Lentopallo
1993	KuPS-Volley	Tampereen Isku-Volley	Raision Loimu
1994	KuPS-Volley	Tampereen Isku-Volley	Raision Loimu
1995	KuPS-Volley	Tampereen Isku-Volley	PPS-Volley, Helsinki
1996	KuPS-Volley	Perttelin Peikot	Tampereen Isku-Volley
1997	Raision Loimu	KuPS-Volley	Tampereen Isku-Volley
1998	KuPS-Volley	Perttelin Peikot	Keski-Savon Pateri, Varkaus
1999	Keski-Savon Pateri	KuPS-Volley	Napapiirin Palloketut, Rovaniemi
2000	KuPS-Volley	Napapiirin Palloketut	Keski-Savon Pateri
2001	Raision Loimu	Pielaveden Sampo	Salon Piivolley
2002	Tampereen Isku-Volley	Perungan Pojat, Rovaniemi	Pielaveden Sampo
2003	Perungan Pojat	Tampereen Isku-Volley	Pielaveden Sampo
2004	Pielaveden Sampo	Salon Piivolley	Korson Veto, Vantaa
2005	Pielaveden Sampo	Salon Piivolley	Tampereen Isku-Volley
2006	Tampereen Isku-Volley	Salon Piivolley	Perungan Pojat
2007	Santasport, Rovaniemi	Pielaveden Sampo	Salon Piivolley
2008	Santasport	Pielaveden Sampo	Vammalan Lentopallo
2009	Pielaveden Sampo	Santasport	Tampereen Isku-Volley
2010	Sun Volley	Pielaveden Sampo	Raision Loimu
2011	Team Lakkapää	Vammalan Lentopallo	Tampereen Isku-Volley
2012	Vammalan Lentopallo	Hurrikaani-Loimaa	Team Lakkapää
2013	Kokkolan Tiikerit	Hurrikaani-Loimaa	Vammalan Lentopallo
2014	Vammalan Lentopallo	Kokkolan Tiikerit	Hurrikaani-Loimaa
2015	Kokkolan Tiikerit	Hurrikaani-Loimaa	Vammalan Lentopallo
2016	Kokkolan Tiikerit	Vammalan Lentopallo	Hurrikaani-Loimaa
2017	Vammalan Lentopallo	Hurrikaani-Loimaa	Pielaveden Sampo
2018	Vammalan Lentopallo	Hurrikaani-Loimaa	Sampo Volley
2019	Vammalan Lentopallo	Etta Oulu	Hurrikaani-Loimaa
2021	Vammalan Lentopallo	Savo Volley	Kokkolan Tiikerit
2022	Vammalan Lentopallo	Savo Volley	Akaa-Volley
2023	Vammalan Lentopallo	Akaa-Volley	Savo Volley
2024	Hurrikaani Loimaa	Akaa-Volley	Vammalan Lentopallo
2025	Akaa-Volley	Hurrikaani Loimaa	Savo Volley
2026	Hurrikaani Loimaa	AC Oulu Volley	Akaa Volley
