= Pielaveden Sampo =

Sampo
- Full name: Pielaveden Sampo
- Founded: 1924
- Ground: Pielaveden liikuntahalli Pielavesi, Finland
- Capacity: 4000
- Chairman: (Finland) Timo Perälä
- Head Coach: (Russia) Ruslan Zhbankov
- League: Finland Champion League
- 2009-10: National League, 2nd place

Pielaveden Sampo is a professional volleyball club based in Pielavesi, a small town in Eastern Finland. The club is one of the most successful teams in the Finland volleyball league. The team has become a national champion in the national volleyball league three times, in 2004, 2005, and 2009, and has been the first runner-up in 2001, 2007, 2008, and 2010. Sampo has also won a bronze medal in 2002 and 2003. There have also been plenty of famous players playing on the team, e.g. Olli Kunnari and Urpo Sivula. One of Sampo's owners is a well-known volleyball player, Tuomas Sammelvuo.

== History ==
Sampo's first season in the Finnish Champion league was season 1998/1999. The next year Sampo became the first runner-up, followed by two bronze medals in 2002 and 2003. In 2004, Sampo won its first national championship, clinching the same title again the following year. Preceded by the miserable 2006 season, the club won the Finland Cup championship and secured a Finland League silver medal in 2007. In the same season Sampo made its debut in the European league finishing eighth. Following all but the same pattern of the previous year, Season 2008 saw Sampo finish second again in the Finland League.

After two consecutive years of having to settle for a silver medal, the club finally achieved its third national championship in 2009. At the end of the season, the club's huge financial troubles were disclosed and it was close to complete withdrawal from the national league. Yet, the club eventually managed to enter the 2010 season with a hugely scaled-down budget. At the end of the season, the club achieved a silver medal.

== Achievements ==
- Finland Champion 2004, 2005, 2009
- Finland league silver 2001, 2007, 2008, 2010
- Finland league bronze 2002, 2003
- CEV-Cup quarterfinal 2007
- Challenge Cup quarterfinal 2008
- Finland Cup Champion 2006, 2007

== Team 2007–2008 ==
Number	Name	Born	Nationality
2	Aki Riihimäki	11.01.1977	Finland
4	Jussi Aamuvuori	12.06.1980	Finland
5	Matti Oivanen	26.05.1986	Finland
6	Ilkka Sammelvuo	21.01.1979	Finland
7	Juha-Matti Iivarinen	11.11.1983	Finland
8	Tatu Säisä	07.03.1983	Finland
9	Salvis Cielavs	13.12.1974	Latvia
10	Urpo Sivula	15.04.1988	Finland
11	Lasse Räisänen	6.11.1989	Finland
12	Timo Tolvanen	8.11.1977	Finland
14	Olli-Pekka Ojansivu	31.12.1987	Finland
15	Tero Viitanen	09.08.1971	Finland
16	Igor Eliseev	-.-.1983	Russia
