= 2009 Men's European Volleyball Championship squads =

This article shows all participating team squads at the 2009 Men's European Volleyball Championship, held in Turkey from 3 to 13 September 2009.

== Bulgaria ==
The following is the Bulgarian roster in the 2009 Men's European Volleyball Championship.

Head coach:	Silvano Prandi
Assistant:	Camillo Placi

No.	Name	Date of birth	2009 club
1	Georgi Bratoev	21 October 1987	(Bulgaria) Levski Sofia
2	Hristo Tsvetanov	29 March 1978	(Russia) Lokomotiv Yekaterinburg
3	Andrey Zhekov	12 March 1980	(Greece) E.A. Patras
4	Vladislav Ivanov	14 March 1987	(Bulgaria) Levski Sofia
5	Krasimir Gaydarski	23 February 1983	(Greece) Olympiacos Piraeus
6	Matey Kaziyski	23 September 1984	(Italy) Itas Diatec Trentino
7	Tsvetan Sokolov	31 December 1989	(Bulgaria) VC Marek Union-Ivkoni
8	Teodor Todorov	1 September 1989	(Bulgaria) CSKA Sofia
9	Metodi Ananiev	17 February 1986	(Bulgaria) Levski Sofia
10	Valentin Bratoev	21 October 1987	(Bulgaria) Levski Sofia
11	Vladimir Nikolov (C)	3 October 1977	(Italy) Piemonte Volley
12	Viktor Yosifov	16 October 1985	(Bulgaria) Czerno More Bask
13	Teodor Salparov	16 August 1982	(Bulgaria) CSKA Sofia
15	Todor Aleksiev	21 April 1983	(Turkey) Halkbank Ankara

== Czech Republic ==
The following is the Czech roster in the 2009 Men's European Volleyball Championship.

Head coach:	Jan Svoboda
Assistant:	Milan Hadrava

No.	Name	Date of birth	2009 club
1	Martin Lébl	12 April 1980	(Italy) Lube Banca Macerata
2	Jiří Popelka	11 May 1977	(Germany) Berlin Recycling Volleys
3	Marek Novotný	4 May 1978	(Greece) E.A. Patras
5	Jaroslav Škach	27 June 1975	(Germany) Berlin Recycling Volleys
7	Aleš Holubec	13 March 1984	(Belgium) Noliko Maaseik
8	Peter Pláteník	16 March 1981	(Italy) Bre Banca Lannutti Cuneo
9	Ondřej Hudeček (C)	9 May 1981	(France) Montpellier UC
11	Jan Štokr	16 January 1983	(Italy) RPA-LuigiBacchi.it Perugia
12	Jakub Veselý	2 September 1986	(France) Arago de Sète
14	Jan Václavík	15 April 1985	(Czech Republic) VK Ostrava
15	Jiří Král	8 July 1981	(Italy) Antonveneta Padova
16	Martin Kryštof	11 October 1982	(Germany) Berlin Recycling Volleys
17	David Konečný	10 October 1982	(France) Tours VB
18	Lukáš Ticháček	12 January 1982	(Germany) VfB Friedrichshafen

== Estonia ==
The following is the Estonian roster in the 2009 Men's European Volleyball Championship.

Head coach:	Avo Keel
Assistant:	Andrei Ojamets

No.	Name	Date of birth	2009 club
1	Raimo Pajusalu	1 February 1981	(Belgium) Knack Randstad Roeselare
3	Keith Pupart	19 March 1985	(Estonia) Selver Tallinn
4	Ardo Kreek	7 August 1986	(Estonia) Selver Tallinn
5	Kert Toobal (C)	3 June 1979	(Estonia) Pere Leib Tartu
6	Sten Esna	24 August 1982	(France) Rennes Volley 35
7	Argo Meresaar	13 January 1980	(Estonia) Selver Tallinn
9	Kristjan Õuekallas	8 January 1981	(France) Beauvais Oise UC
10	Asko Esna	1 May 1986	(Estonia) Selver Tallinn
11	Oliver Venno	23 May 1990	(Estonia) Pere Leib Tartu
12	Janis Sirelpuu	14 August 1977	(Estonia) Selver Tallinn
13	Veiko Lember	29 November 1977	(Estonia) Selver Tallinn
16	Eerik Jago	29 December 1980	(Italy) Pallavolo Pineto
17	Martti Rosenblatt	29 December 1987	(Estonia) Selver Tallinn
18	Jaanus Nõmmsalu	19 January 1981	(Estonia) Selver Tallinn

== Finland ==
The following is the Finnish roster in the 2009 Men's European Volleyball Championship.

Head coach:	Mauro Berruto
Assistant:	Andrea Brogioni

No.	Name	Date of birth	2009 club
1	Jesse Mäntylä	24 March 1987	(Finland) Salon Piivolley
3	Mikko Esko	3 September 1978	(Italy) Acqua Paradiso Gabeca Montichiari
4	Olli-Pekka Ojansivu	31 December 1987	(Finland) Pielaveden Sampo
5	Antti Siltala	14 March 1984	(Greece) Aris Thessaloniki
6	Tuomas Sammelvuo (C)	16 February 1976	(Italy) Tonno Callipo Vibo Valentia
7	Matti Hietanen	3 January 1983	(Italy) Pallavolo Pineto
9	Pasi Hyvärinen	22 November 1987	(Finland) Muuramen Lentopallo
10	Simo-Pekka Olli	13 November 1985	(Finland) Raision Loimu
12	Olli Kunnari	2 February 1982	(Poland) AZS Olsztyn
13	Mikko Oivanen	26 May 1986	(Poland) Asseco Resovia Rzeszów
14	Konstantin Shumov	15 February 1985	(Italy) Callipo Vibo Valentia
15	Matti Oivanen	26 May 1986	(France) Beauvais Oise UC
16	Urpo Sivula	15 March 1988	(Italy) Acqua Paradiso Gabeca Montichiari
18	Jukka Lehtonen	22 February 1982	(Greece) Aris Thessaloniki

== France ==
The following is the French roster in the 2009 Men's European Volleyball Championship.

Head coach:	Philippe Blain
Assistant:	Olivier Lecat

No.	Name	Date of birth	2009 club
1	Yannick Bazin	18 June 1983	(France) Paris Volley
2	Hubert Henno	6 October 1976	(Italy) Volley Forlì
4	Antonin Rouzier	18 August 1986	(Belgium) Knack Randstad Roeselare
5	Romain Vadeleux	12 February 1983	(France) AS Cannes Volley-Ball
6	Jean-Philippe Sol	1 January 1986	(France) Montpellier UC
7	Stéphane Antiga	3 February 1976	(Poland) PGE Skra Bełchatów
9	Guillaume Samica	28 September 1981	(Poland) Jastrzębski Węgiel
10	Stéphane Tolar	4 July 1984	(France) Tourcoing Lille Métropole Volley-Ball
11	Édouard Rowlandson	27 July 1988	(France) Arago de Sète
13	Toafa Takaniko	29 May 1985	(France) Spacer's Toulouse Volley
14	Samuel Tuia	24 July 1986	(France) AS Cannes Volley-Ball
15	Baptiste Geiler	12 March 1987	(France) Montpellier UC
17	Oliver Kieffer (C)	27 August 1979	(France) Stade Poitevin Poitiers
18	Jean-François Exiga	20 May 1982	(France) AS Cannes Volley-Ball

== Greece ==
The following is the Greek roster in the 2009 Men's European Volleyball Championship.

Head coach:	Stelios Kazazis
Assistant:	Ioannis Fakas

No.	Name	Date of birth	2009 club
1	Konstantinos Christofidelis	26 June 1977	(Greece) Olympiacos Piraeus
2	Mitar Tzourits	25 April 1989	(Greece) Olympiacos Piraeus
3	Apóstolos Armenákis	19 July 1980	(France) AS Cannes Volley-Ball
6	Vasileios Kournetas	2 August 1976	(Greece) Olympiacos Piraeus
7	Georgios Stefanou	12 January 1981	(Greece) Panathinaikos Athens
8	Konstantinos Prousalis	6 October 1980	(Greece) P.A.O.K. Thessaloniki
9	Theoklitos Karipidis	18 January 1980	(Greece) Olympiacos Piraeus
10	Andreas Andreadis	14 January 1982	(Greece) Panathinaikos Athens
11	Nikolaos Roumeliotis (C)	12 October 1978	(Greece) Olympiacos Piraeus
12	Nikolaos Smaragdis	12 February 1982	(Greece) Iraklis Thessaloniki
14	Sotirios Pantaleon	21 June 1980	(Greece) Panathinaikos Athens
15	Ilias Lappas	20 July 1979	(Greece) Panathinaikos Athens
17	Achilleas Papadimitriou	18 August 1980	(Greece) Olympiacos Piraeus
18	Theodoros Baev	31 May 1977	(Turkey) Halkbank Ankara

== Spain ==
The following is the Spanish roster in the 2009 Men's European Volleyball Championship.

Head coach:	Julio Velasco
Assistant:	Antonio Alemany

No.	Name	Date of birth	2009 club
1	Guillermo Falasca	24 October 1977	(Italy) Copra Nordmeccanica Piacenza
3	José Luis Lobato	19 February 1977	(Spain) Unicaja Almería
5	Francisco José Rodriguez	25 September 1980	(Spain) CV Teruel
6	Sergio Noda	23 March 1987	(Spain) Unicaja Almería
7	Guillermo Hernán	25 July 1982	(Spain) CV Teruel
8	Alberto Salas	13 September 1984	(Spain) Ciudad del Medio Ambiente Soria
10	Miguel Ángel Falasca (C)	29 April 1973	(Poland) PGE Skra Bełchatów
11	Manuel Parres	29 March 1984	(Spain) UCAM Murcia
12	Francesc Llenas	13 September 1982	(Spain) CV Teruel
13	Juan Carlos Barcala	25 January 1984	(Spain) Unicaja Almería
14	José Luis Moltó	29 June 1975	(Italy) Stamplast Prisma Martina Franca
16	Julian Garcia-Torres	8 November 1980	(Spain) CV Pòrtol
17	Marlon Rafael Palharini	3 February 1984	(Spain) Club Vigo Voleibal
18	Israel Rodríguez	27 August 1981	(Italy) Stamplast Prisma Martina Franca

== Netherlands ==
The following is the Dutch roster in the 2009 Men's European Volleyball Championship.

Head coach:	Peter Blangé
Assistant:	Arnold van Ree

No.	Name	Date of birth	2009 club
1	Dirk-Jan van Gendt	18 July 1974	(Belgium) VC Euphony Asse-Lennik
3	Yannick van Harskamp	2 April 1986	(Netherlands) VC Nesselande
4	Robert Horstink	26 December 1981	(Italy) Acqua Paradiso Gabeca Montichiari
7	Richard Rademaker	18 March 1982	(Netherlands) VC Nesselande
8	Kay van Dijk	25 June 1984	(South Korea) Gumi KB Insurance Stars
9	Jeroen Trommel (C)	1 August 1980	(Turkey) İstanbul Belediyesi
10	Jeroen Rauwerdink	13 September 1985	(Italy) Acqua Paradiso Gabeca Montichiari
11	Jan Willem Snippe	21 May 1986	(Italy) Lube Banca Macerata
12	Wytze Kooistra	3 June 1982	(Italy) Trenkwalder Modena
13	Tije Vlam	9 October 1985	(Netherlands) VC Nesselande
14	Niels Klapwijk	19 September 1985	(Netherlands) VC Nesselande
15	Lars Lorsheijd	8 June 1985	(Netherlands) VC Nesselande
17	Rob Bontje	12 May 1981	(Italy) Marmi Lanza Verona
18	Jelte Maan	19 March 1986	(Belgium) Noliko Maaseik

== Germany ==
The following is the German roster in the 2009 Men's European Volleyball Championship.

Head coach:	Raúl Lozano
Assistant:	Juan Manuel Serramalera

No.	Name	Date of birth	2009 club
2	Dirk Westphal	31 January 1986	(Germany) Berlin Recycling Volleys
3	Sebastian Schwarz	11 October 1980	(Germany) Generali Unterhaching
4	Simon Tischer	24 April 1982	(Greece) Iraklis Thessaloniki
5	Björn Andrae	14 May 1981	(Greece) Panathinaikos Athens
6	Markus Steuerwald	7 March 1989	(Germany) VfB Friedrichshafen
7	Georg Wiebel	6 April 1977	(Belgium) Noliko Maaseik
8	Marcus Böhme	25 August 1985	(Germany) Berlin Recycling Volleys
10	Jochen Schöps	8 October 1983	(Russia) VC Iskra Odintsovo
12	Ferdinand Tille	8 December 1988	(Germany) Generali Unterhaching
14	Robert Kromm (C)	9 March 1984	(Italy) Antonveneta Padova
15	Max Günthör	9 August 1985	(Germany) Generali Unterhaching
16	Eugen Bakumovski	11 October 1980	(Germany) Generali Unterhaching
17	Patrick Steuerwald	3 March 1986	(Germany) Generali Unterhaching
18	György Grozer	27 December 1984	(Germany) VfB Friedrichshafen

== Italy ==
The following is the Italian roster in the 2009 Men's European Volleyball Championship.

Head coach:	Andrea Anastasi
Assistant:	Andrea Gardini

No.	Name	Date of birth	2009 club
2	Simone Parodi	16 June 1986	(Italy) Marmi Lanza Verona
3	Mauro Gavotto	16 April 1979	(Italy) Acqua Paradiso Gabeca Montichiari
4	Loris Manià	27 January 1979	(Italy) Acqua Paradiso Gabeca Montichiari
5	Valerio Vermiglio (C)	1 March 1976	(Italy) Lube Banca Macerata
7	Michal Lasko	11 March 1981	(Italy) Marmi Lanza Verona
8	Alberto Cisolla	17 October 1977	(Italy) Sisley Treviso
9	Matteo Martino	28 January 1987	(Italy) Lube Banca Macerata
11	Cristian Savani	22 February 1982	(Italy) Sir Safety Perugia
12	Andrea Bari	5 March 1980	(Italy) Itas Diatec Trentino
13	Francesco Fortunato	23 July 1977	(Italy) Bre Banca Lannutti Cuneo
14	Dragan Travica	28 August 1986	(Italy) Trenkwalder Modena
15	Emanuele Birarelli	8 February 1981	(Italy) Itas Diatec Trentino
17	Andrea Sala	27 December 1978	(Italy) Acqua Paradiso Gabeca Montichiari
18	Matej Černić	13 September 1978	(Italy) Stamplast Prisma Martina Franca

== Poland ==
The following is the Polish roster in the 2009 Men's European Volleyball Championship.

Head coach:	Daniel Castellani
Assistant:	Krzysztof Stelmach

No.	Name	Date of birth	2009 club
1	Piotr Nowakowski	18 December 1987	(Poland) AZS Częstochowa
3	Piotr Gruszka	8 March 1977	(Turkey) Arkas Izmir
4	Daniel Pliński	10 December 1978	(Poland) PGE Skra Bełchatów
5	Paweł Zagumny (C)	18 October 1977	(Poland) AZS UWM Olsztyn
6	Bartosz Kurek	29 August 1988	(Poland) PGE Skra Bełchatów
7	Jakub Jarosz	10 February 1987	(Poland) PGE Skra Bełchatów
9	Zbigniew Bartman	4 May 1987	(Russia) Gazprom-Ugra Surgut
10	Marcel Gromadowski	19 December 1985	(Italy) Zinella Volley Bologna
12	Paweł Woicki	29 June 1983	(Poland) Asseco Resovia Rzeszów
14	Michał Ruciak	22 August 1983	(Poland) ZAKSA Kędzierzyn-Koźle
15	Piotr Gacek	16 September 1978	(Poland) PGE Skra Bełchatów
16	Krzysztof Ignaczak	15 May 1978	(Poland) Asseco Resovia Rzeszów
17	Michał Bąkiewicz	22 March 1981	(Poland) PGE Skra Bełchatów
18	Marcin Możdżonek	9 February 1985	(Poland) PGE Skra Bełchatów

== Russia ==
The following is the Russian roster in the 2009 Men's European Volleyball Championship.

Head coach:	Daniele Bagnoli
Assistant:	Yaroslav Antonov

No.	Name	Date of birth	2009 club
1	Denis Biryukov	8 December 1988	(Russia) Metallurg-Oskol Stary Oskol
2	Semyon Poltavskiy	8 February 1981	(Russia) Dinamo Moscow
3	Aleksandr Kosarev	30 September 1977	(Russia) Lokomotiv Belgorod
4	Alexey Cheremisin	23 September 1980	(Russia) Zenit Kazan
5	Sergey Grankin	21 January 1985	(Russia) Dinamo Moscow
7	Aleksey Kazakov	18 March 1976	(Russia) Ural Ufa
8	Sergey Tetyukhin (C)	23 September 1975	(Russia) Lokomotiv Belgorod
9	Vadim Khamuttskikh	26 November 1969	(Russia) Lokomotiv Belgorod
10	Yury Berezhko	27 January 1984	(Russia) Dinamo Moscow
15	Aleksandr Volkov	14 February 1985	(Russia) Dinamo Moscow
16	Aleksey Verbov	31 January 1982	(Russia) Iskra Odintsovo
17	Maxim Mikhaylov	19 March 1988	(Russia) Yaroslavich Yaroslavl
18	Aleksey Kuleshov	24 February 1979	(Russia) Iskra Odintsovo
19	Alexander Yanutov	19 June 1983	(Russia) Gazprom-Ugra Surgut

== Serbia ==
The following is the Serbian roster in the 2009 Men's European Volleyball Championship.

Head coach:	Igor Kolaković
Assistant:	Željko Bulatović

No.	Name	Date of birth	2009 club
1	Nikola Kovačević	14 February 1983	(Italy) RPA-LuigiBacchi.it Perugia
4	Bojan Janić	11 March 1982	(Poland) Trefl Gdańsk
5	Vlado Petković	6 January 1983	(Serbia) OK Vojvodina
6	Miloš Terzić	13 June 1987	(Serbia) Crvena Zvezda Belgrad
7	Dragan Stanković	18 October 1985	(Montenegro) Budvanska Rivijera Budva
8	Marko Samardzić	22 February 1983	(Poland) Trefl Gdańsk
9	Nikola Grbić (C)	6 September 1973	(Italy) Itas Diatec Trentino
10	Miloš Nikić	31 March 1986	(Belgium) Knack Randstad Roeselare
11	Nikola Rosić	5 August 1984	(Germany) Moerser SC
12	Andrija Gerić	24 January 1977	(Greece) Panathinaikos Athens
14	Ivan Miljković	13 September 1979	(Greece) Olympiakos Pireus
15	Saša Starović	19 October 1988	(Montenegro) Budvanska Rivijera Budva
16	Nemanja Petrić	28 July 1987	(Montenegro) OK Budućnost Podgorica
18	Marko Podraščanin	29 August 1987	(Italy) Lube Banca Macerata

== Slovakia ==
The following is the Slovak roster in the 2009 Men's European Volleyball Championship.

Head coach:	Emanuele Zanini
Assistant:	Štefan Chrtiansky

No.	Name	Date of birth	2009 club
1	Milan Bencz	5 September 1987	(Austria) SK Posojilnica Aich/Dob
2	Michal Masný (C)	14 August 1979	(Poland) ZAKSA Kędzierzyn-Koźle
3	Emanuel Kohút	21 July 1982	(Italy) Sisley Treviso
4	Martin Pipa	3 September 1974	(Austria) SK Posojilnica Aich/Dob
5	Matej Kubš	26 May 1988	(Slovakia) VKP Bratislava
6	Jozef Piovarči	9 November 1984	(Czech Republic) VK Opava
8	Martin Sopko	30 January 1982	(Poland) Delecta Bydgoszcz
9	František Ogurčák	24 April 1984	(Italy) Bassano Volley
10	Martin Nemec	31 July 1984	(Italy) RPA-LuigiBacchi.it Perugia
14	Tomáš Kmeť	1 December 1981	(Italy) Materdomini Volley
15	Juraj Žatko	5 June 1987	(Czech Republic) VK Ostrava
18	Lukáš Diviš	20 February 1986	(Germany) VfB Friedrichshafen

== Slovenia ==
The following is the Slovenian roster in the 2009 Men's European Volleyball Championship.

Head coach:	Gregor Hribar
Assistant:	Radovan Gačić

No.	Name	Date of birth	2009 club
1	Andrej Flajs	11 March 1983	(Slovenia) ACH Volley Ljubljana
2	Alen Pajenk	23 April 1986	(Slovenia) ACH Volley Ljubljana
3	Davor Čebron	25 January 1981	(Slovenia) ACH Volley Ljubljana
4	Matej Vidič	6 November 1986	(Slovenia) ACH Volley Ljubljana
5	Alen Šket	28 March 1988	(Slovenia) ACH Volley Ljubljana
6	Mitja Gasparini	26 June 1984	(Slovenia) ACH Volley Ljubljana
7	Matija Pleško	3 March 1976	(Slovenia) ACH Volley Ljubljana
9	Tine Urnaut (C)	3 September 1988	(Greece) Olympiacos Piraeus
10	Dejan Vinčič	15 September 1986	(Slovenia) ACH Volley Ljubljana
12	Sebastijan Škorc	12 February 1974	(Slovenia) ACH Volley Ljubljana
13	Tomislav Šmuc	23 June 1976	(Italy) Trenkwalder Modena
14	Jasmin Čuturić	5 July 1974	(France) Beauvais Oise UC

== Turkey ==
The following is the Turkish roster in the 2009 Men's European Volleyball Championship.

Head coach:	Fausto Polidori
Assistant:	Armando Cosentino

No.	Name	Date of birth	2009 club
1	Selçuk Keskin	15 January 1982	(Turkey) Arkas Izmir
3	Ahmet Toçoğlu	13 March 1980	(Turkey) Arkas Izmir
5	Nuri Şahin	1 January 1980	(Turkey) Arkas Izmir
6	Emre Batur	21 April 1988	(Turkey) Fenerbahçe Grundig
7	Sinan Cem Tanık	19 June 1980	(Turkey) Halkbank Ankara
8	Volkan Güc	16 July 1980	(Turkey) Halkbank Ankara
9	Ahmet Pezuk	8 June 1987	(Turkey) Galatasaray Istanbul
10	Akif Gökhan Öner (C)	6 September 1972	(Turkey) Arkas Izmir
12	Arslan Eksi	17 July 1985	(Turkey) Fenerbahçe Grundig
14	Erhan Dünge	4 February 1980	(Turkey) İstanbul Büyükşehir Belediyesi
15	Hasan Yeşilbudak	11 January 1984	(Turkey) Arçelik İstanbul
16	Halil İbrahim Akşeker	5 February 1987	(Turkey) Galatasaray Istanbul
17	Can Ayvazoğlu	14 September 1979	(Turkey) Galatasaray Istanbul
18	Ali Alp Çayir	13 September 1981	(Turkey) Galatasaray Istanbul
