= 2015 Men's European Volleyball Championship squads =

This article shows all participating team squads at the 2015 Men's European Volleyball Championship, held in Bulgaria and Italy from 9–18 October 2015.

== Belarus ==
The following is the Belarusian roster in the 2015 Men's European Volleyball Championship.

Head coach:	Victor Sidelnikov
Assistant:	Viktar Beksha

No.	Name	Date of birth	2015 club
1	Andrei Radziuk	29 March 1990	(Kazakhstan) Taraz Volley
2	Pavel Audochanka	13 June 1990	
3	Viachaslau Charapovich	8 February 1992	
5	Siarhei Busel	30 May 1989	
6	Yury Martynau	6 May 1991	
10	Aliaksei Kurash	1 June 1988	
11	Stanislau Zabarouski	4 January 1988	
14	Dzmitry Vash	23 April 1988	
15	Vadzim Pranko	14 September 1991	(Belarus) VK Minsk
17	Maksim Marozau	29 May 1989	(Belarus) VK Minsk
18	Maksim Budziukhin	13 December 1992	
19	Radzivon Miskevich	22 April 1995	(Belarus) VK Minsk

== Belgium ==
The following is the Belgian roster in the 2015 Men's European Volleyball Championship.

Head coach:	Dominique Baeyens
Assistant:	Christophe Achten

No.	Name	Date of birth	2015 club
1	Bram Van Den Dries	14 August 1989	(Turkey) Maliye Milli Piyango SK
3	Sam Deroo	24 April 1992	(Italy) Marmi Lanza Verona
4	Pieter Coolman	24 April 1989	(Belgium) Knack Randstad Roeselare
6	Stijn Dejonckheere	21 January 1988	(Belgium) Knack Randstad Roeselare
8	Kévin Klinkenberg	4 October 1990	(France) Tours Volley-Ball
9	Pieter Verhees	8 December 1989	(Italy) Modena Volley
10	Simon Van de Voorde	19 December 1989	(Italy) Andreoli Latina
12	Gert Van Walle	7 August 1987	(France) Beauvais Oise UC
13	Dennis Deroey	14 August 1987	(Belgium) Topvolley Antwerpen
15	Stijn D'Hulst	24 April 1991	(Belgium) Knack Randstad Roeselare
16	Matthias Valkiers	8 April 1990	(Turkey) Palandöken Belediyesi SK
17	Tomas Rousseaux	31 March 1994	(Belgium) Knack Randstad Roeselare
18	Seppe Baetens	13 February 1989	(Belgium) VC Euphony Asse-Lennik
19	Martijn Colson	8 April 1994	(Belgium) Topvolley Antwerpen

== Bulgaria ==
The following is the Bulgarian roster in the 2015 Men's European Volleyball Championship.

Head coach:	Plamen Konstantinov
Assistant:

No.	Name	Date of birth	Height	Weight	Spike	Block	2015 club
1	Georgi Bratoev	21 October 1987	2.02 m (6 ft 8 in)	88 kg (194 lb)	335 cm (132 in)	318 cm (125 in)	(Italy) Trentino Volley
2	Stanislav Petkov	31 December 1987	2.02 m (6 ft 8 in)	104 kg (229 lb)	335 cm (132 in)	325 cm (128 in)	(Romania) Tomis Constanța
3	Andrey Zhekov	12 March 1980	1.90 m (6 ft 3 in)	82 kg (181 lb)	340 cm (130 in)	326 cm (128 in)	(Romania) Tomis Constanța
7	Miroslav Gradinarov	10 February 1985	2.03 m (6 ft 8 in)	91 kg (201 lb)	350 cm (140 in)	330 cm (130 in)	(France) Spacer's Toulouse Volley
10	Nikolay Uchikov	13 April 1986	2.04 m (6 ft 8 in)	100 kg (220 lb)	370 cm (150 in)	350 cm (140 in)	(Russia) VK Tjumen
11	Vladimir Nikolov	3 October 1977	2.00 m (6 ft 7 in)	95 kg (209 lb)	345 cm (136 in)	325 cm (128 in)	(France) ASUL Lyon
12	Viktor Yosifov	16 October 1985	2.04 m (6 ft 8 in)	100 kg (220 lb)	350 cm (140 in)	340 cm (130 in)	(Italy) Andreoli Latina
13	Teodor Salparov	16 August 1982	1.87 m (6 ft 2 in)	77 kg (170 lb)	320 cm (130 in)	305 cm (120 in)	(Russia) Zenit Kazan
14	Teodor Todorov	1 September 1989	2.08 m (6 ft 10 in)	94 kg (207 lb)	365 cm (144 in)	345 cm (136 in)	(Switzerland) Pallavolo Lugano
15	Todor Aleksiev	21 April 1983	2.00 m (6 ft 7 in)	105 kg (231 lb)	355 cm (140 in)	340 cm (130 in)	(Russia) Gazprom-Ugra Surgut
16	Vladislav Ivanov	14 March 1987	1.88 m (6 ft 2 in)	80 kg (180 lb)	320 cm (130 in)	310 cm (120 in)	(France) ASUL Lyon
17	Nikolay Penchev	22 May 1992	1.96 m (6 ft 5 in)	85 kg (187 lb)	341 cm (134 in)	320 cm (130 in)	(Poland) Asseco Resovia Rzeszów
18	Nikolay Nikolov	29 July 1986	2.06 m (6 ft 9 in)	97 kg (214 lb)	344 cm (135 in)	330 cm (130 in)	(Iran) Shahrdari Urmia VC
23	Lyubomir Agontsev	26 July 1987	1.90 m (6 ft 3 in)	87 kg (192 lb)	335 cm (132 in)	318 cm (125 in)	(Italy) Andreoli Latina

== Croatia ==
The following is the Croatian roster in the 2015 Men's European Volleyball Championship.

Head coach:	Igor Šimunčić
Assistant:

No.	Name	Date of birth	2015 club
1	Tsimafei Zhukouski	18 December 1989	(Italy) Pallavolo Molfetta
2	Dejan Skočić	9 May 1983	(Germany) Chemie Volley Mitteldeutschland
3	Danijel Galić	14 April 1987	(Spain) CV Teruel
4	Mate Glaurdić	12 October 1992	
5	Igor Omrčen	26 September 1980	(Japan) Toyoda Gosei Trefuerza
6	Ivan Raič	3 June 1989	(France) Arago de Sète
7	Šime Vulin	4 August 1983	(Greece) Pamvohaikos Vocha
8	Sven Sarčević	6 December 1990	
10	Filip Sestan	6 June 1995	
11	Toni Kovačević	15 January 1983	(United Arab Emirates) Al-Nasr SC
12	Fran Peterlin	15 August 1993	
13	Hrvoje Zelenika	2 February 1992	
14	Inoslav Krnić	14 January 1979	(Slovakia) VKC Humenné
17	Ivan Mihalj	23 November 1990	(Greece) Ethnikos Alexandroupolis

== Czech Republic ==
The following is the Czech roster in the 2015 Men's European Volleyball Championship.

Head coach:	Zdeněk Šmejkal
Assistant:

No.	Name	Date of birth	2015 club
1	Jakub Veselý	2 September 1986	(France) Saint-Nazaire Volley-Ball Atlantique
3	Radek Mach	28 September 1984	(Czech Republic) Jihostroj České Budějovice
4	Daniel Pfeffer	27 April 1990	(Czech Republic) VK Karlovy Vary
5	Jiří Král	8 July 1981	(France) Beauvais Oise UC
7	Aleš Holubec	13 March 1984	(France) Nantes Rezé Métropole Volley
9	Pavel Bartoš	20 April 1994	(Czech Republic) VSC Zlín
10	Michal Finger	2 September 1993	(Germany) VfB Friedrichshafen
11	Martin Kryštof	11 October 1982	(Germany) Berlin Recycling Volleys
13	Kamil Baránek	2 May 1983	(Turkey) Galatasaray SK
14	Adam Bartoš	27 April 1992	(France) Tours Volley-Ball
16	Tomáš Fila	12 July 1985	(Czech Republic) Jihostroj České Budějovice
18	Jakub Janouch	13 June 1990	(Czech Republic) VK Dukla Liberec
19	Petr Michálek	19 August 1989	(Czech Republic) Jihostroj České Budějovice

== Estonia ==
The following is the Estonian roster in the 2015 Men's European Volleyball Championship.

Head coach:	Gheorghe Creţu
Assistant:

No.	Name	Date of birth	Height	Weight	Spike	Block	2015 club
1	Henri Treial	28 May 1992	2.02 m (6 ft 8 in)	96 kg (212 lb)	345 cm (136 in)	322 cm (127 in)	(Italy) VBC Mondovi
3	Keith Pupart	19 March 1985	1.95 m (6 ft 5 in)	93 kg (205 lb)	350 cm (140 in)	335 cm (132 in)	(Poland) Cuprum Lubin
4	Ardo Kreek	7 August 1986	2.03 m (6 ft 8 in)	100 kg (220 lb)	340 cm (130 in)	330 cm (130 in)	(Poland) Asseco Resovia Rzeszów
5	Kert Toobal (C)	3 June 1979	1.89 m (6 ft 2 in)	78 kg (172 lb)	345 cm (136 in)	325 cm (128 in)	(Poland) AZS Olsztyn
6	Martti Juhkami	6 June 1988	1.95 m (6 ft 5 in)	94 kg (207 lb)	335 cm (132 in)	315 cm (124 in)	(Germany) VfB Friedrichshafen
7	Renee Teppan	26 September 1993	1.97 m (6 ft 6 in)	89 kg (196 lb)	340 cm (130 in)	320 cm (130 in)	(Italy) Diatec Trentino
9	Robert Täht	15 August 1993	1.91 m (6 ft 3 in)	82 kg (181 lb)	338 cm (133 in)	314 cm (124 in)	(Italy) Sir Safety Perugia
11	Oliver Venno	23 May 1990	2.10 m (6 ft 11 in)	110 kg (240 lb)	355 cm (140 in)	330 cm (130 in)	(Germany) VfB Friedrichshafen
13	Andres Toobal	27 August 1988	1.93 m (6 ft 4 in)	84 kg (185 lb)	335 cm (132 in)	320 cm (130 in)	(Belgium) Topvolley Antwerpen
14	Rait Rikberg	30 August 1982	1.74 m (5 ft 9 in)	79 kg (174 lb)	307 cm (121 in)	290 cm (110 in)	(Belgium) Prefaxis Menen
16	Madis Pärtel	1 November 1985	1.91 m (6 ft 3 in)	82 kg (181 lb)	340 cm (130 in)	310 cm (120 in)	(Estonia) TTÜ VK
17	Timo Tammemaa	18 November 1991	2.02 m (6 ft 8 in)	93 kg (205 lb)	337 cm (133 in)	327 cm (129 in)	(Poland) Asseco Resovia Rzeszów
18	Rauno Tamme	7 April 1992	1.88 m (6 ft 2 in)	78 kg (172 lb)	342 cm (135 in)	320 cm (130 in)	(Estonia) Saaremaa VK
19	Andri Aganits	7 September 1993	2.07 m (6 ft 9 in)	100 kg (220 lb)	356 cm (140 in)	340 cm (130 in)	(France) Stade Poitevin Poitiers

== Finland ==
The following is the Finnish roster in the 2015 Men's European Volleyball Championship.

Head coach:	Tuomas Sammelvuo
Assistant:	Jaana Laurila

No.	Name	Date of birth	2015 club
1	Ville Juntura	26 March 1988	(Finland) Raision Loimu
2	Eemi Tervaportti	26 July 1989	(Belgium) Knack Randstad Roeselare
4	Lauri Kerminen	18 January 1993	(France) Nantes Rezé Métropole Volley
5	Antti Siltala	14 March 1984	(Russia) Yenisey Krasnoyarsk
6	Niklas Seppänen	30 June 1993	(France) Tourcoing Lille Métropole Volley-Ball
9	Tommi Siirilä	15 March 1988	(Finland) Kokkolan Tiikerit
10	Urpo Sivula	15 March 1988	(Finland) Raision Loimu
11	Sauli Sinkkonen	14 September 1989	(Finland) Tampereen Isku-Volley
12	Olli Kunnari	2 February 1982	(Finland) Vammalan Lentopallo
13	Mikko Oivanen	26 May 1986	(Finland) Vammalan Lentopallo
14	Konstantin Shumov	15 February 1985	(Italy) Cucine Lube Treia
16	Olli-Pekka Ojansivu	31 December 1987	(Finland) Kokkolan Tiikerit
18	Jukka Lehtonen	22 February 1982	(Finland) LEKA Kuopio
19	Pasi Hyvärinen	22 November 1987	(Finland) Kokkolan Tiikerit

== France ==
The following is the French roster in the 2015 Men's European Volleyball Championship.

Head coach:	Laurent Tillie
Assistant:	Arnaud Josserand

No.	Name	Date of birth	2015 club
1	Jonas Aguenier	28 April 1992	(France) AS Cannes
2	Jenia Grebennikov	13 August 1990	(Germany) VfB Friedrichshafen
4	Antonin Rouzier	18 August 1986	(Turkey) Ziraat Bankası Ankara
6	Benjamin Toniutti	30 October 1989	(Germany) VfB Friedrichshafen
7	Kévin Tillie	2 November 1990	(Turkey) Arkas Izmir
9	Earvin N'Gapeth	21 February 1991	(Italy) Modena Volley
10	Kévin Le Roux	11 May 1989	(South Korea) Cheonan Hyundai Capital Skywalkers
11	Julien Lyneel	15 April 1990	(France) Montpellier UC
13	Pierre Pujol	13 July 1984	(France) AS Cannes
14	Nicolas Le Goff	15 February 1992	(France) Montpellier UC
16	Nicolas Maréchal	4 March 1987	(Poland) Jastrzębski Węgiel
17	Franck Lafitte	8 March 1989	(France) Montpellier UC
20	Nicolas Rossard	23 May 1990	(France) Arago de Sète
21	Mory Sidibé	17 June 1987	(China) Sichuan Volleyball

== Germany ==
The following is the German roster in the 2015 Men's European Volleyball Championship.

Head coach:	Vital Heynen
Assistant:	Stefan Hübner

No.	Name	Date of birth	2015 club
1	Christian Fromm	15 August 1990	(Italy) Sir Safety Perugia
2	Markus Steuerwald	7 March 1989	(France) Paris Volley
3	Sebastian Schwarz	2 October 1985	(Poland) Lotos Trefl Gdańsk
6	Denis Kaliberda	24 June 1990	(Germany) Jastrzębski Węgiel
7	Dirk Westphal	31 January 1986	(Poland) Czarni Radom
8	Marcus Böhme	25 August 1985	(Turkey) Fenerbahçe SK
9	Georg Grozer	27 November 1984	(Russia) Belogorie Belgorod
10	Jochen Schöps	3 October 1983	(Poland) Asseco Resovia Rzeszów
11	Lukas Kampa	29 November 1986	(Poland) Czarni Radom
12	Ferdinand Tille	8 December 1988	(Poland) PGE Skra Bełchatów
14	Tom Strohbach	27 May 1992	(Germany) TV Rottenburg
15	Tim Broshog	2 December 1987	(Belgium) Noliko Maaseik
17	Jan Zimmermann	12 February 1993	(Germany) VfB Friedrichshafen
18	Michael Andrei	6 August 1985	(Belgium) Topvolley Antwerpen

== Italy ==
The following is the Italian roster in the 2015 Men's European Volleyball Championship.

Head coach:	Gianlorenzo Blengini
Assistant:

No.	Name	Date of birth	Height	Weight	Spike	Block	2015 club
3	Daniele Sottile	17 August 1979	1.86 m (6 ft 1 in)	73 kg (161 lb)	302 cm (119 in)	280 cm (110 in)	(Italy) Andreoli Latina
4	Luca Vettori	26 April 1991	2.00 m (6 ft 7 in)	95 kg (209 lb)	353 cm (139 in)	323 cm (127 in)	(Italy) Modena Volley
5	Osmany Juantorena	12 August 1985	2.00 m (6 ft 7 in)	85 kg (187 lb)	370 cm (150 in)	340 cm (130 in)	(Turkey) Halkbank Ankara
6	Simone Giannelli	9 August 1996	1.98 m (6 ft 6 in)	92 kg (203 lb)	342 cm (135 in)	320 cm (130 in)	(Italy) Trentino Volley
7	Salvatore Rossini	13 July 1986	1.85 m (6 ft 1 in)	82 kg (181 lb)	308 cm (121 in)	280 cm (110 in)	(Italy) Modena Volley
9	Ivan Zaytsev	2 October 1988	2.02 m (6 ft 8 in)	92 kg (203 lb)	359 cm (141 in)	348 cm (137 in)	(Russia) Dinamo Moscow
10	Filippo Lanza	3 March 1991	1.98 m (6 ft 6 in)	98 kg (216 lb)	350 cm (140 in)	328 cm (129 in)	(Italy) Trentino Volley
11	Simone Buti	19 September 1983	2.06 m (6 ft 9 in)	100 kg (220 lb)	346 cm (136 in)	328 cm (129 in)	(Italy) Sir Safety Perugia
13	Massimo Colaci	21 February 1985	1.80 m (5 ft 11 in)	75 kg (165 lb)	302 cm (119 in)	278 cm (109 in)	(Italy) Trentino Volley
14	Matteo Piano	24 October 1990	2.08 m (6 ft 10 in)	102 kg (225 lb)	352 cm (139 in)	325 cm (128 in)	(Italy) Modena Volley
16	Oleg Antonov	28 July 1988	1.98 m (6 ft 6 in)	88 kg (194 lb)	340 cm (130 in)	322 cm (127 in)	(France) Tours VB
18	Giulio Sabbi	10 August 1989	2.01 m (6 ft 7 in)	92 kg (203 lb)	352 cm (139 in)	325 cm (128 in)	(Italy) Cucine Lube Treia
19	Simone Anzani	24 February 1992	2.04 m (6 ft 8 in)	99 kg (218 lb)	350 cm (140 in)	328 cm (129 in)	(Italy) BluVolley Verona
22	Jacopo Massari	2 June 1988	1.85 m (6 ft 1 in)	79 kg (174 lb)	246 cm (97 in)	221 cm (87 in)	(Italy) Copra Elior Piacenza

== Netherlands ==
The following is the Dutch roster in the 2015 Men's European Volleyball Championship.

Head coach:	Gido Vermeulen
Assistant:

No.	Name	Date of birth	2015 club
1	Nimir Abdel-Aziz	5 February 1992	(Poland) ZAKSA Kędzierzyn-Koźle
2	Yannick van Harskamp	2 April 1986	(Belgium) Topvolley Antwerpen
4	Thijs ter Horst	18 September 1981	(Italy) Marmi Lanza Verona
6	Jasper Diefenbach	17 March 1988	(Belgium) VC Euphony Asse-Lennik
7	Gijs Jorna	30 May 1989	(Belgium) Topvolley Antwerpen
8	Sebastiaan van Bemmelen	18 August 1989	(Belgium) Topvolley Antwerpen
10	Jeroen Rauwerdink	13 September 1985	(Italy) Andreoli Latina
11	Dick Kooy	3 December 1987	(Poland) ZAKSA Kędzierzyn-Koźle
12	Kay van Dijk	25 October 1984	(Poland) ZAKSA Kędzierzyn-Koźle
13	Maarten Van Garderen	24 January 1990	(Germany) VfB Friedrichshafen
14	Niels Klapwijk	19 September 1985	(Turkey) Beşiktaş JK
15	Thomas Koelewijn	18 December 1988	(France) Arago de Sète
17	Johannes Bontje	12 May 1981	(Germany) Berlin Recycling Volleys
18	Robbert Andringa	28 April 1990	(Belgium) VC Euphony Asse-Lennik

== Poland ==
The following is the Polish roster in the 2015 Men's European Volleyball Championship.

Head coach:	Stephane Antiga
Assistant:	Philippe Blain

No.	Name	Date of birth	Height	Weight	Spike	Block	2015 club
1	Piotr Nowakowski	18 December 1987	2.05 m (6 ft 9 in)	90 kg (200 lb)	355 cm (140 in)	340 cm (130 in)	(Poland) Asseco Resovia Rzeszów
3	Dawid Konarski	31 August 1989	1.98 m (6 ft 6 in)	101 kg (223 lb)	353 cm (139 in)	335 cm (132 in)	(Poland) Asseco Resovia Rzeszów
6	Bartosz Kurek	29 August 1988	2.07 m (6 ft 9 in)	104 kg (229 lb)	375 cm (148 in)	340 cm (130 in)	(Italy) Cucine Lube Treia
7	Karol Kłos	8 August 1989	2.01 m (6 ft 7 in)	83 kg (183 lb)	357 cm (141 in)	326 cm (128 in)	(Poland) PGE Skra Bełchatów
9	Mateusz Bieniek	5 April 1994	2.10 m (6 ft 11 in)	98 kg (216 lb)	351 cm (138 in)	329 cm (130 in)	(Poland) Effector Kielce
11	Fabian Drzyzga	3 January 1990	1.96 m (6 ft 5 in)	90 kg (200 lb)	325 cm (128 in)	304 cm (120 in)	(Poland) Asseco Resovia Rzeszów
12	Grzegorz Łomacz	1 October 1987	1.87 m (6 ft 2 in)	81 kg (179 lb)	336 cm (132 in)	309 cm (122 in)	(Poland) MKS Cuprum Lubin
13	Michał Kubiak (C)	23 February 1988	1.91 m (6 ft 3 in)	80 kg (180 lb)	328 cm (129 in)	312 cm (123 in)	(Turkey) Halkbank Ankara
15	Piotr Gacek	16 September 1978	1.85 m (6 ft 1 in)	80 kg (180 lb)	328 cm (129 in)	305 cm (120 in)	(Poland) Lotos Trefl Gdańsk
17	Paweł Zatorski	21 June 1990	1.84 m (6 ft 0 in)	73 kg (161 lb)	328 cm (129 in)	304 cm (120 in)	(Poland) ZAKSA Kędzierzyn-Koźle
18	Marcin Możdżonek	9 February 1985	2.11 m (6 ft 11 in)	93 kg (205 lb)	358 cm (141 in)	338 cm (133 in)	(Turkey) Halkbank Ankara
20	Mateusz Mika	21 January 1991	2.06 m (6 ft 9 in)	86 kg (190 lb)	352 cm (139 in)	320 cm (130 in)	(Poland) Lotos Trefl Gdańsk
21	Rafał Buszek	28 April 1987	1.94 m (6 ft 4 in)	81 kg (179 lb)	345 cm (136 in)	327 cm (129 in)	(Poland) Asseco Resovia Rzeszów
25	Artur Szalpuk	20 March 1995	2.02 m (6 ft 8 in)	92 kg (203 lb)	348 cm (137 in)	325 cm (128 in)	(Poland) AZS Politechnika Warszawska

== Russia ==
The following is the Russian roster in the 2015 Men's European Volleyball Championship.

Head coach:	Vladimir Alekno
Assistant:

No.	Name	Date of birth	Height	Weight	Spike	Block	2015 club
1	Alexey Obmochaev	22 May 1989	1.88 m (6 ft 2 in)	80 kg (180 lb)	325 cm (128 in)	310 cm (120 in)	(Russia) Dynamo Moscow
2	Pavel Kruglov	17 September 1985	2.05 m (6 ft 9 in)	99 kg (218 lb)	351 cm (138 in)	340 cm (130 in)	(Russia) Dynamo Moscow
3	Dmitry Kovalev	15 March 1991	1.98 m (6 ft 6 in)	93 kg (205 lb)	340 cm (130 in)	330 cm (130 in)	(Russia) Guberniya Nizhniy Novgorod
4	Artem Volvich	22 January 1990	2.08 m (6 ft 10 in)	98 kg (216 lb)	350 cm (140 in)	330 cm (130 in)	(Russia) Lokomotiv Novosibirsk
5	Sergey Grankin	21 January 1985	1.95 m (6 ft 5 in)	96 kg (212 lb)	351 cm (138 in)	320 cm (130 in)	(Russia) Dynamo Moscow
6	Evgeny Sivozhelez	6 August 1986	1.96 m (6 ft 5 in)	90 kg (200 lb)	330 cm (130 in)	320 cm (130 in)	(Russia) Zenit-Kazan
8	Sergey Savin	7 October 1988	2.01 m (6 ft 7 in)	92 kg (203 lb)	343 cm (135 in)	325 cm (128 in)	(Russia) Guberniya Nizhniy Novgorod
11	Ilia Vlasov	3 August 1995	2.12 m (6 ft 11 in)	101 kg (223 lb)	360 cm (140 in)	345 cm (136 in)	(Russia) Fakel Novy Urengoy
13	Dmitriy Muserskiy	29 October 1988	2.18 m (7 ft 2 in)	110 kg (240 lb)	375 cm (148 in)	347 cm (137 in)	(Russia) Belogorie Belgorod
14	Victor Poletaev	27 July 1995	1.97 m (6 ft 6 in)	86 kg (190 lb)	360 cm (140 in)	340 cm (130 in)	(Russia) Zenit-Kazan
15	Dmitriy Ilinykh	31 January 1987	2.01 m (6 ft 7 in)	92 kg (203 lb)	338 cm (133 in)	328 cm (129 in)	(Russia) Belogorie Belgorod
16	Egor Kliuka	15 June 1995	2.03 m (6 ft 8 in)	93 kg (205 lb)	360 cm (140 in)	345 cm (136 in)	(Russia) Fakel Novy Urengoy
17	Maxim Mikhaylov	19 March 1988	2.02 m (6 ft 8 in)	104 kg (229 lb)	345 cm (136 in)	330 cm (130 in)	(Russia) Zenit-Kazan
22	Alexey Verbov	31 January 1982	1.83 m (6 ft 0 in)	78 kg (172 lb)	315 cm (124 in)	305 cm (120 in)	(Russia) Zenit-Kazan

== Serbia ==
The following is the Serbian roster in the 2015 Men's European Volleyball Championship.

Head coach:	Nikola Grbić
Assistant:

No.	Name	Date of birth	Height	Weight	Spike	Block	2015 club
1	Nikola Kovačević	14 February 1983	1.93 m (6 ft 4 in)	78 kg (172 lb)	350 cm (140 in)	340 cm (130 in)	(France) Paris Volley
2	Uroš Kovačević	6 May 1993	1.97 m (6 ft 6 in)	90 kg (200 lb)	340 cm (130 in)	310 cm (120 in)	(Italy) Modena Volley
4	Nemanja Petrić	28 July 1987	2.02 m (6 ft 8 in)	86 kg (190 lb)	333 cm (131 in)	320 cm (130 in)	(Italy) Modena Volley
7	Dragan Stanković (C)	18 October 1985	2.05 m (6 ft 9 in)	80 kg (180 lb)	343 cm (135 in)	333 cm (131 in)	(Italy) Cucine Lube Treia
8	Marko Ivović	22 December 1990	1.92 m (6 ft 4 in)	89 kg (196 lb)	350 cm (140 in)	330 cm (130 in)	(Poland) Asseco Resovia Rzeszów
9	Nikola Jovović	13 February 1992	1.97 m (6 ft 6 in)	75 kg (165 lb)	335 cm (132 in)	315 cm (124 in)	(Italy) Vero Volley Monza
14	Aleksandar Atanasijević	4 September 1991	2.00 m (6 ft 7 in)	92 kg (203 lb)	350 cm (140 in)	329 cm (130 in)	(Italy) Sir Safety Perugia
15	Saša Starović	19 October 1988	2.07 m (6 ft 9 in)	89 kg (196 lb)	335 cm (132 in)	321 cm (126 in)	(Italy) Androeli Latina
16	Aleksa Brđović	29 July 1993	2.04 m (6 ft 8 in)	90 kg (200 lb)	355 cm (140 in)	330 cm (130 in)	(Poland) PGE Skra Bełchatów
17	Neven Majstorović	17 March 1989	1.92 m (6 ft 4 in)	83 kg (183 lb)	335 cm (132 in)	315 cm (124 in)	(Serbia) OK Partizan
18	Marko Podraščanin	29 August 1987	2.04 m (6 ft 8 in)	92 kg (203 lb)	343 cm (135 in)	326 cm (128 in)	(Italy) Cucine Lube Treia
19	Nikola Rosić	5 August 1984	1.92 m (6 ft 4 in)	85 kg (187 lb)	328 cm (129 in)	315 cm (124 in)	(Romania) Tomis Constanța
20	Srećko Lisinac	17 May 1992	2.05 m (6 ft 9 in)	79 kg (174 lb)	345 cm (136 in)	335 cm (132 in)	(Poland) PGE Skra Bełchatów
22	Aleksandar Okolić	26 June 1993	2.05 m (6 ft 9 in)	90 kg (200 lb)	347 cm (137 in)	320 cm (130 in)	(Serbia) OK Crvena Zvezda

== Slovakia ==
The following is the Slovak roster in the 2015 Men's European Volleyball Championship.

Head coach:	Alberto Giuliani
Assistant:

No.	Name	Date of birth	2015 club
2	Tomáš Kriško	19 December 1988	(Czech Republic) VK Dukla Liberec
3	Emanuel Kohút	21 July 1982	(Italy) Pallavolo Piacenza
5	Matej Kubš	26 May 1988	(Slovakia) VK Ekonóm Nitra
6	Daniel Končál	16 September 1982	(France) Asnières Volley
8	Martin Sopko	30 January 1982	(Slovakia) VK Prešov
9	Luboš Němec	2 March 1995	(Slovakia) VK Komárno
12	Matej Patak	8 June 1990	(France) Beauvais Oise UC
13	Štefan Chrtianský	14 August 1989	(Austria) Hypo Tirol Innsbruck
14	Šimon Krajčovič	28 June 1996	(Slovakia) COP Volley Trenčín
15	Juraj Zaťko	5 June 1987	(Poland) Indykpol AZS Olsztyn
16	Peter Michalovič	26 May 1990	(Italy) Impavida Ortona
17	František Ogurčák	24 April 1984	(Poland) Indykpol AZS Olsztyn
19	Radoslav Presinsky	14 January 1989	(Slovakia) VK Ekonóm Nitra
20	Peter Ondrovič	28 March 1995	(Slovakia) COP Volley Trenčín

== Slovenia ==
The following is the Slovenian roster in the 2015 Men's European Volleyball Championship.

Head coach:	Andrea Giani
Assistant:

No.	Name	Date of birth	Height	Weight	Spike	Block	2015 club
2	Alen Pajenk	23 April 1986	2.03 m (6 ft 8 in)	90 kg (200 lb)	352 cm (139 in)	336 cm (132 in)	(Poland) Jastrzębski Węgiel
4	Uroš Pavlovič	30 March 1992	2.02 m (6 ft 8 in)	90 kg (200 lb)	346 cm (136 in)	332 cm (131 in)	(Austria) SK Posojilnica Aich/Dob
5	Alen Šket	28 March 1988	2.03 m (6 ft 8 in)	90 kg (200 lb)	348 cm (137 in)	335 cm (132 in)	(Italy) Andreoli Latina
6	Mitja Gasparini	26 June 1984	2.00 m (6 ft 7 in)	90 kg (200 lb)	347 cm (137 in)	334 cm (131 in)	(France) Paris Volley
8	Miha Plot	11 May 1987	1.83 m (6 ft 0 in)	79 kg (174 lb)	324 cm (128 in)	305 cm (120 in)	(Slovenia) MOK Krka
9	Dejan Vinčič	15 September 1986	2.00 m (6 ft 7 in)	91 kg (201 lb)	344 cm (135 in)	331 cm (130 in)	(France) Narbonne Volley
11	Danijel Koncilja	4 September 1990	2.01 m (6 ft 7 in)	90 kg (200 lb)	348 cm (137 in)	334 cm (131 in)	(Austria) SK Posojilnica Aich/Dob
12	Jan Klobučar	11 December 1992	1.95 m (6 ft 5 in)	89 kg (196 lb)	344 cm (135 in)	330 cm (130 in)	(Germany) United Volleys Rhein-Mein
13	Tine Urnaut	3 September 1988	1.99 m (6 ft 6 in)	87 kg (192 lb)	348 cm (137 in)	332 cm (131 in)	(Italy) Trentino Volley
14	Jan Pokeršnik	15 December 1989	1.99 m (6 ft 6 in)	85 kg (187 lb)	344 cm (135 in)	331 cm (130 in)	(Switzerland) Dragons Lugano
16	Gregor Ropret	1 March 1989	1.92 m (6 ft 4 in)	82 kg (181 lb)	340 cm (130 in)	328 cm (129 in)	(Austria) Hypo Tirol Innsbruck
17	Jani Kovačič	14 June 1992	1.85 m (6 ft 1 in)	80 kg (180 lb)	329 cm (130 in)	310 cm (120 in)	(France) AS Cannes Volley-Ball
18	Klemen Čebulj	21 February 1992	2.00 m (6 ft 7 in)	87 kg (192 lb)	350 cm (140 in)	336 cm (132 in)	(Italy) CMC Ravenna
23	Jan Kozamernik	24 December 1995	2.01 m (6 ft 7 in)	90 kg (200 lb)	341 cm (134 in)	323 cm (127 in)	(Slovenia) ACH Volley Ljubljana
