= Bontje =

Bontje is a surname. Notable people with the surname include:

- Rob Bontje (born 1981), Dutch volleyball player
- Ellen Bontje (born 1958), Dutch olympic equestrian
