= Skra Bełchatów squads =

This article shows the previous rosters of Skra Bełchatów volleyball team at PlusLiga in Poland.

== 2020/2021 ==
The following is the PGE Skra Bełchatów roster in the 2020–21 PlusLiga.

| Head coach: | (Poland) Michał Mieszko Gogol |
| Assistant: | (Poland) Radosław Kolanek |

| No. | Name | Date of birth | Height | Weight | Spike | Position |
|---|---|---|---|---|---|---|
| 1 | (Poland) Bartosz Filipiak | 27 February 1994 | 1.97 m (6 ft 6 in) | 82 kg (181 lb) | 355 cm (140 in) | opposite |
| 3 | (United States) Taylor Sander | 17 March 1992 | 1.96 m (6 ft 5 in) | 80 kg (180 lb) | 325 cm (128 in) | outside hitter |
| 6 | (Poland) Karol Kłos | 8 August 1989 | 2.01 m (6 ft 7 in) | 87 kg (192 lb) | 355 cm (140 in) | middle blocker |
| 7 | (Poland) Sebastian Adamczyk | 28 February 1999 | 0 m (0 in) | 0 kg (0 lb) | 0 cm (0 in) | middle blocker |
| 8 | (Serbia) Milan Katić | 22 October 1993 | 2.01 m (6 ft 7 in) | 99 kg (218 lb) | 345 cm (136 in) | outside hitter |
| 11 | (Iran) Milad Ebadipour | 17 October 1993 | 1.96 m (6 ft 5 in) | 78 kg (172 lb) | 358 cm (141 in) | outside hitter |
| 12 | (Serbia) Dušan Petković | 27 January 1992 | 2.02 m (6 ft 8 in) | 86 kg (190 lb) | 352 cm (139 in) | opposite |
| 15 | (Poland) Grzegorz Łomacz (C) | 1 October 1987 | 1.88 m (6 ft 2 in) | 80 kg (180 lb) | 336 cm (132 in) | setter |
| 16 | (Poland) Kacper Piechocki | 17 December 1995 | 1.85 m (6 ft 1 in) | 75 kg (165 lb) | 322 cm (127 in) | libero |
| 18 | (Poland) Robert Milczarek | 28 November 1983 | 1.88 m (6 ft 2 in) | 78 kg (172 lb) | 340 cm (130 in) | libero |
| 20 | (Poland) Mateusz Bieniek | 5 April 1994 | 2.08 m (6 ft 10 in) | 98 kg (216 lb) | 351 cm (138 in) | middle blocker |
| 26 | (Serbia) Mihajlo Mitić | 17 September 1990 | 0 m (0 in) | 0 kg (0 lb) | 0 cm (0 in) | setter |
| 55 | (Poland) Mikołaj Sawicki | 23 November 1999 | 0 m (0 in) | 0 kg (0 lb) | 0 cm (0 in) | outside hitter |
| 99 | (Poland) Norbert Huber | 14 August 1998 | 2.07 m (6 ft 9 in) | 91 kg (201 lb) | 352 cm (139 in) | middle blocker |

== 2019/2020 ==
The following is the PGE Skra Bełchatów roster in the 2019–20 PlusLiga.

| Head coach: | (Poland) Michał Mieszko Gogol |
| Assistant: | (Poland) Radosław Kolanek |

| No. | Name | Date of birth | Height | Weight | Spike | Position |
|---|---|---|---|---|---|---|
| 1 | (Poland) Kamil Droszyński | January 28, 1997 | 1.90 m (6 ft 3 in) | 86 kg (190 lb) | 337 cm (133 in) | setter |
| 2 | (Poland) Mariusz Wlazły (C) | August 4, 1983 | 1.94 m (6 ft 4 in) | 80 kg (180 lb) | 365 cm (144 in) | opposite |
| 6 | (Poland) Karol Kłos | August 8, 1989 | 2.01 m (6 ft 7 in) | 87 kg (192 lb) | 355 cm (140 in) | middle blocker |
| 7 | (Poland) Jakub Kochanowski | July 17, 1997 | 1.99 m (6 ft 6 in) | 84 kg (185 lb) | 360 cm (140 in) | middle blocker |
| 8 | (Serbia) Milan Katić | October 22, 1993 | 2.01 m (6 ft 7 in) | 99 kg (218 lb) | 345 cm (136 in) | outside hitter |
| 11 | (Iran) Milad Ebadipour | October 17, 1993 | 1.96 m (6 ft 5 in) | 78 kg (172 lb) | 358 cm (141 in) | outside hitter |
| 12 | (Poland) Artur Szalpuk | March 20, 1995 | 2.01 m (6 ft 7 in) | 93 kg (205 lb) | 350 cm (140 in) | outside hitter |
| 15 | (Poland) Grzegorz Łomacz | October 1, 1987 | 1.88 m (6 ft 2 in) | 80 kg (180 lb) | 336 cm (132 in) | setter |
| 16 | (Poland) Kacper Piechocki | February 17, 1995 | 1.85 m (6 ft 1 in) | 75 kg (165 lb) | 322 cm (127 in) | libero |
| 17 | (Poland) Piotr Orczyk | March 19, 1993 | 1.98 m (6 ft 6 in) | 87 kg (192 lb) | 355 cm (140 in) | outside hitter |
| 18 | (Poland) Robert Milczarek | November 28, 1983 | 1.88 m (6 ft 2 in) | 78 kg (172 lb) | 340 cm (130 in) | libero |
| 21 | (Serbia) Dušan Petković | January 27, 1992 | 2.02 m (6 ft 8 in) | 86 kg (190 lb) | 352 cm (139 in) | opposite |
| 23 | (Poland) Aleksander Antosiewicz | February 13, 2001 | 2.05 m (6 ft 9 in) | 93 kg (205 lb) | 340 cm (130 in) | middle blocker |
| 99 | (Poland) Norbert Huber | August 14, 1998 | 2.07 m (6 ft 9 in) | 91 kg (201 lb) | 352 cm (139 in) | middle blocker |

== 2018/2019 ==
The following is the PGE Skra Bełchatów roster in the 2018–19 PlusLiga.

| Head coach: | (Italy) Roberto Piazza |
| Assistant: | (Poland) Michał Winiarski |

| No. | Name | Date of birth | Height | Weight | Spike | Position |
|---|---|---|---|---|---|---|
| 1 | (Poland) Kamil Droszyński | 28 January 1997 | 1.90 m (6 ft 3 in) | 86 kg (190 lb) | 337 cm (133 in) | setter |
| 2 | (Poland) Mariusz Wlazły (C) | 4 August 1983 | 1.94 m (6 ft 4 in) | 80 kg (180 lb) | 365 cm (144 in) | opposite |
| 3 | (Estonia) Renee Teppan | 16 September 1993 | 1.97 m (6 ft 6 in) | 89 kg (196 lb) | 345 cm (136 in) | opposite |
| 4 | (Poland) Hubert Węgrzyn | 6 January 2000 | 2.00 m (6 ft 7 in) | 94 kg (207 lb) | 348 cm (137 in) | middle blocker |
| 5 | (Poland) Dawid Filipek | 21 February 2001 | 1.90 m (6 ft 3 in) | 84 kg (185 lb) | 323 cm (127 in) | setter |
| 6 | (Poland) Karol Kłos | 8 August 1989 | 2.01 m (6 ft 7 in) | 87 kg (192 lb) | 355 cm (140 in) | middle blocker |
| 7 | (Poland) Jakub Kochanowski | 17 July 1997 | 1.99 m (6 ft 6 in) | 84 kg (185 lb) | 360 cm (140 in) | middle blocker |
| 8 | (Serbia) Milan Katić | 22 October 1993 | 2.01 m (6 ft 7 in) | 99 kg (218 lb) | 345 cm (136 in) | outside hitter |
| 9 | (Poland) Patryk Czarnowski | 1 November 1985 | 2.04 m (6 ft 8 in) | 98 kg (216 lb) | 365 cm (144 in) | middle blocker |
| 10 | (Poland) Robert Milczarek | 28 November 1983 | 1.88 m (6 ft 2 in) | 78 kg (172 lb) | 340 cm (130 in) | libero |
| 11 | (Iran) Milad Ebadipour | 17 October 1993 | 1.96 m (6 ft 5 in) | 78 kg (172 lb) | 358 cm (141 in) | outside hitter |
| 12 | (Poland) Artur Szalpuk | 20 March 1995 | 2.01 m (6 ft 7 in) | 93 kg (205 lb) | 350 cm (140 in) | outside hitter |
| 13 | (Poland) Aleksander Antosiewicz | 13 February 2001 | 2.05 m (6 ft 9 in) | 93 kg (205 lb) | 340 cm (130 in) | middle blocker |
| 14 | (Cuba) David Fiel | 28 August 1993 | 2.04 m (6 ft 8 in) | 93 kg (205 lb) | 374 cm (147 in) | middle blocker |
| 15 | (Poland) Grzegorz Łomacz | 1 October 1987 | 1.88 m (6 ft 2 in) | 80 kg (180 lb) | 336 cm (132 in) | setter |
| 16 | (Poland) Kacper Piechocki | 17 December 1995 | 1.85 m (6 ft 1 in) | 75 kg (165 lb) | 322 cm (127 in) | libero |
| 17 | (Poland) Piotr Orczyk | 19 March 1993 | 1.98 m (6 ft 6 in) | 87 kg (192 lb) | 355 cm (140 in) | outside hitter |

== 2017/2018 ==
The following is the PGE Skra Bełchatów roster in the 2017–18 PlusLiga.

| Head coach: | (Italy) Roberto Piazza |
| Assistant: | (Poland) Michał Winiarski |

| No. | Name | Date of birth | Height | Weight | Spike | Position |
|---|---|---|---|---|---|---|
| 1 | (Serbia) Srećko Lisinac | 17 May 1992 | 2.05 m (6 ft 9 in) | 90 kg (200 lb) | 375 cm (148 in) | middle blocker |
| 2 | (Poland) Mariusz Wlazły (C) | 4 August 1983 | 1.94 m (6 ft 4 in) | 80 kg (180 lb) | 365 cm (144 in) | opposite |
| 3 | (Poland) Wiktor Nowak | 21 May 1999 | 0 m (0 in) | 0 kg (0 lb) | 0 cm (0 in) | setter |
| 4 | (Poland) Sebastian Adamczyk | 28 February 1999 | 0 m (0 in) | 0 kg (0 lb) | 0 cm (0 in) | middle blocker |
| 5 | (Poland) Marcin Janusz | 31 July 1994 | 1.91 m (6 ft 3 in) | 81 kg (179 lb) | 326 cm (128 in) | setter |
| 6 | (Poland) Karol Kłos | 8 August 1989 | 2.01 m (6 ft 7 in) | 87 kg (192 lb) | 355 cm (140 in) | middle blocker |
| 7 | (Poland) Bartosz Bednorz | 25 July 1994 | 2.01 m (6 ft 7 in) | 87 kg (192 lb) | 350 cm (140 in) | outside hitter |
| 8 | (Serbia) Milan Katić | 22 October 1993 | 2.01 m (6 ft 7 in) | 99 kg (218 lb) | 345 cm (136 in) | outside hitter |
| 9 | (Poland) Patryk Czarnowski | 1 November 1985 | 2.04 m (6 ft 8 in) | 98 kg (216 lb) | 365 cm (144 in) | middle blocker |
| 10 | (Poland) Mikołaj Sawicki | 23 November 1999 | 0 m (0 in) | 0 kg (0 lb) | 0 cm (0 in) | outside hitter |
| 11 | (Iran) Milad Ebadipour | 17 October 1993 | 1.96 m (6 ft 5 in) | 78 kg (172 lb) | 358 cm (141 in) | outside hitter |
| 12 | (Poland) Hubert Węgrzyn | 6 January 2000 | 2.00 m (6 ft 7 in) | 94 kg (207 lb) | 348 cm (137 in) | middle blocker |
| 13 | (Poland) Szymon Romać | 1 October 1992 | 1.96 m (6 ft 5 in) | 98 kg (216 lb) | 355 cm (140 in) | opposite |
| 14 | (Serbia) Aleksandar Nedeljković | 27 October 1997 | 2.05 m (6 ft 9 in) | 96 kg (212 lb) | 338 cm (133 in) | middle blocker |
| 15 | (Poland) Grzegorz Łomacz | 1 October 1987 | 1.88 m (6 ft 2 in) | 80 kg (180 lb) | 336 cm (132 in) | setter |
| 16 | (Poland) Kacper Piechocki | 17 December 1995 | 1.85 m (6 ft 1 in) | 75 kg (165 lb) | 322 cm (127 in) | libero |
| 17 | (Bulgaria) Nikolay Penchev | 22 May 1992 | 1.96 m (6 ft 5 in) | 90 kg (200 lb) | 341 cm (134 in) | outside hitter |
| 18 | (Poland) Robert Milczarek | 28 November 1983 | 1.88 m (6 ft 2 in) | 78 kg (172 lb) | 340 cm (130 in) | libero |
| 19 | (Poland) Antoni Piotrowski | 3 August 1999 | 1.90 m (6 ft 3 in) | 75 kg (165 lb) | 345 cm (136 in) | outside hitter |
| 20 | (Poland) Przemysław Stąsiek | 30 December 1999 | 1.88 m (6 ft 2 in) | 73 kg (161 lb) | 335 cm (132 in) | libero |

== 2016/2017 ==
The following is the PGE Skra Bełchatów roster in the 2016–17 PlusLiga.

| Head coach: | (France) Philippe Blain |
| Assistant: | (Poland) Krzysztof Stelmach |

| No. | Name | Date of birth | Height | Weight | Spike | Position |
|---|---|---|---|---|---|---|
| 1 | (Serbia) Srećko Lisinac | 17 May 1992 | 2.05 m (6 ft 9 in) | 90 kg (200 lb) | 375 cm (148 in) | middle blocker |
| 2 | (Poland) Mariusz Wlazły (C) | 4 August 1983 | 1.94 m (6 ft 4 in) | 80 kg (180 lb) | 365 cm (144 in) | opposite |
| 4 | (Poland) Mariusz Marcyniak | 5 March 1992 | 2.06 m (6 ft 9 in) | 102 kg (225 lb) | 350 cm (140 in) | middle blocker |
| 5 | (Poland) Bartosz Kurek | 29 August 1988 | 2.05 m (6 ft 9 in) | 105 kg (231 lb) | 375 cm (148 in) | opposite |
| 6 | (Poland) Karol Kłos | 8 August 1989 | 2.01 m (6 ft 7 in) | 87 kg (192 lb) | 355 cm (140 in) | middle blocker |
| 7 | (Poland) Bartosz Bednorz | 25 July 1994 | 2.01 m (6 ft 7 in) | 87 kg (192 lb) | 350 cm (140 in) | outside hitter |
| 8 | (Poland) Yuriy Gladyr | 8 July 1984 | 2.02 m (6 ft 8 in) | 96 kg (212 lb) | 360 cm (140 in) | middle blocker |
| 9 | (Poland) Marcin Janusz | 31 July 1994 | 1.91 m (6 ft 3 in) | 81 kg (179 lb) | 326 cm (128 in) | setter |
| 10 | (Argentina) Nicolás Uriarte | 21 March 1990 | 1.89 m (6 ft 2 in) | 87 kg (192 lb) | 340 cm (130 in) | setter |
| 12 | (Poland) Artur Szalpuk | 20 March 1995 | 2.01 m (6 ft 7 in) | 93 kg (205 lb) | 350 cm (140 in) | outside hitter |
| 13 | (Poland) Michał Winiarski | 28 September 1983 | 2.00 m (6 ft 7 in) | 82 kg (181 lb) | 345 cm (136 in) | outside hitter |
| 16 | (Poland) Kacper Piechocki | 17 December 1995 | 1.85 m (6 ft 1 in) | 75 kg (165 lb) | 322 cm (127 in) | libero |
| 17 | (Bulgaria) Nikolay Penchev | 22 May 1992 | 1.96 m (6 ft 5 in) | 90 kg (200 lb) | 341 cm (134 in) | outside hitter |
| 18 | (Poland) Robert Milczarek | 28 November 1983 | 1.88 m (6 ft 2 in) | 78 kg (172 lb) | 340 cm (130 in) | libero |

== 2015/2016 ==
The following is the PGE Skra Bełchatów roster in the 2015–16 PlusLiga.

| Head coach: | (Spain) Miguel Ángel Falasca (2015–Mar 2016) / (France) Philippe Blain (Mar 2016–present) |
| Assistant: | (Italy) Fabio Storti |

| No. | Name | Date of birth | Height | Weight | Spike | Position |
|---|---|---|---|---|---|---|
| 1 | (Serbia) Srećko Lisinac | 17 May 1992 | 2.05 m (6 ft 9 in) | 90 kg (200 lb) | 375 cm (148 in) | middle blocker |
| 2 | (Poland) Mariusz Wlazły (C) | 4 August 1983 | 1.94 m (6 ft 4 in) | 80 kg (180 lb) | 365 cm (144 in) | opposite |
| 3 | (Poland) Wiktor Nowak | 21 May 1999 | 0 m (0 in) | 0 kg (0 lb) | 0 cm (0 in) | setter |
| 4 | (Poland) Mariusz Marcyniak | 5 March 1992 | 2.06 m (6 ft 9 in) | 102 kg (225 lb) | 350 cm (140 in) | middle blocker |
| 5 | (Poland) Bartosz Pełka | 15 June 1997 | 1.85 m (6 ft 1 in) | 69 kg (152 lb) | 329 cm (130 in) | outside hitter |
| 6 | (Poland) Karol Kłos | 8 August 1989 | 2.01 m (6 ft 7 in) | 87 kg (192 lb) | 355 cm (140 in) | middle blocker |
| 7 | (Argentina) Facundo Conte | 25 August 1989 | 1.97 m (6 ft 6 in) | 98 kg (216 lb) | 355 cm (140 in) | outside hitter |
| 8 | (Poland) Andrzej Wrona | 27 December 1988 | 2.06 m (6 ft 9 in) | 96 kg (212 lb) | 355 cm (140 in) | middle blocker |
| 9 | (Poland) Marcin Janusz | 31 July 1994 | 1.91 m (6 ft 3 in) | 81 kg (179 lb) | 326 cm (128 in) | setter |
| 10 | (Argentina) Nicolás Uriarte | 21 March 1990 | 1.89 m (6 ft 2 in) | 87 kg (192 lb) | 340 cm (130 in) | setter |
| 11 | (Serbia) Mihajlo Stanković | 5 June 1993 | 1.99 m (6 ft 6 in) | 92 kg (203 lb) | 345 cm (136 in) | outside hitter |
| 12 | (Poland) Adam Surgut | 23 December 1996 | 1.94 m (6 ft 4 in) | 86 kg (190 lb) | 335 cm (132 in) | outside hitter |
| 13 | (Poland) Michał Winiarski | 28 September 1983 | 2.00 m (6 ft 7 in) | 82 kg (181 lb) | 345 cm (136 in) | outside hitter |
| 14 | (Poland) Marcel Gromadowski | 19 December 1985 | 2.03 m (6 ft 8 in) | 105 kg (231 lb) | 350 cm (140 in) | opposite |
| 15 | (Spain) Israel Rodríguez | 27 August 1981 | 1.95 m (6 ft 5 in) | 96 kg (212 lb) | 347 cm (137 in) | outside hitter |
| 16 | (Poland) Kacper Piechocki | 17 February 1995 | 1.85 m (6 ft 1 in) | 75 kg (165 lb) | 322 cm (127 in) | libero |
| 17 | (Poland) Robert Milczarek | 28 November 1983 | 1.88 m (6 ft 2 in) | 78 kg (172 lb) | 340 cm (130 in) | libero |
| 18 | (France) (Poland) Nicolas Maréchal | 4 March 1987 | 1.98 m (6 ft 6 in) | 94 kg (207 lb) | 335 cm (132 in) | outside hitter |

== 2014/2015 ==
The following is the PGE Skra Bełchatów roster in the 2014–15 PlusLiga.

| Head coach: | (Spain) Miguel Ángel Falasca |
| Assistant: | (Italy) Fabio Storti |

| No. | Name | Date of birth | Height | Weight | Spike | Position |
|---|---|---|---|---|---|---|
| 1 | (Serbia) Srećko Lisinac | 17 May 1992 | 2.05 m (6 ft 9 in) | 90 kg (200 lb) | 375 cm (148 in) | middle blocker |
| 2 | (Poland) Mariusz Wlazły (C) | 4 August 1983 | 1.94 m (6 ft 4 in) | 80 kg (180 lb) | 365 cm (144 in) | opposite |
| 6 | (Poland) Karol Kłos | 8 August 1989 | 2.01 m (6 ft 7 in) | 87 kg (192 lb) | 355 cm (140 in) | middle blocker |
| 7 | (Argentina) Facundo Conte | 25 August 1989 | 1.97 m (6 ft 6 in) | 98 kg (216 lb) | 355 cm (140 in) | outside hitter |
| 8 | (Poland) Andrzej Wrona | 27 December 1988 | 2.06 m (6 ft 9 in) | 96 kg (212 lb) | 355 cm (140 in) | middle blocker |
| 9 | (Poland) Maciej Muzaj | 21 May 1994 | 2.08 m (6 ft 10 in) | 88 kg (194 lb) | 379 cm (149 in) | opposite |
| 10 | (Argentina) Nicolás Uriarte | 21 March 1990 | 1.89 m (6 ft 2 in) | 87 kg (192 lb) | 340 cm (130 in) | setter |
| 11 | (Poland) Piotr Badura | 20 February 1995 | 2.06 m (6 ft 9 in) | 95 kg (209 lb) | 355 cm (140 in) | middle blocker |
| 12 | (Poland) Wojciech Włodarczyk | 28 October 1990 | 2.00 m (6 ft 7 in) | 88 kg (194 lb) | 348 cm (137 in) | outside hitter |
| 13 | (Poland) Michał Winiarski | 28 September 1983 | 2.00 m (6 ft 7 in) | 82 kg (181 lb) | 345 cm (136 in) | outside hitter |
| 15 | (Serbia) Aleksa Brđović | 29 July 1993 | 2.04 m (6 ft 8 in) | 90 kg (200 lb) | 355 cm (140 in) | setter |
| 16 | (Poland) Kacper Piechocki | 17 December 1995 | 1.85 m (6 ft 1 in) | 75 kg (165 lb) | 322 cm (127 in) | libero |
| 17 | (Germany) Ferdinand Tille | 8 December 1988 | 1.85 m (6 ft 1 in) | 75 kg (165 lb) | 338 cm (133 in) | libero |
| 18 | (France) (Poland) Nicolas Maréchal | 4 March 1987 | 1.98 m (6 ft 6 in) | 94 kg (207 lb) | 335 cm (132 in) | outside hitter |

== 2013/2014 ==
The following is the PGE Skra Bełchatów roster in the 2013–14 PlusLiga.

| Head coach: | (Spain) Miguel Ángel Falasca |
| Assistant: | (Italy) Fabio Storti |

| No. | Name | Date of birth | Height | Weight | Spike | Position |
|---|---|---|---|---|---|---|
| 2 | (Poland) Mariusz Wlazły (C) | 4 August 1983 | 1.94 m (6 ft 4 in) | 80 kg (180 lb) | 365 cm (144 in) | opposite |
| 3 | (Poland) Łukasz Pietrzak | 25 July 1995 | 2.03 m (6 ft 8 in) | 89 kg (196 lb) | 348 cm (137 in) | opposite |
| 4 | (Poland) Daniel Pliński | 10 December 1978 | 2.04 m (6 ft 8 in) | 100 kg (220 lb) | 330 cm (130 in) | middle blocker |
| 5 | (France) Samuel Tuia | 24 July 1986 | 1.95 m (6 ft 5 in) | 80 kg (180 lb) | 360 cm (140 in) | outside hitter |
| 6 | (Poland) Karol Kłos | 8 August 1989 | 2.01 m (6 ft 7 in) | 87 kg (192 lb) | 355 cm (140 in) | middle blocker |
| 7 | (Argentina) Facundo Conte | 25 August 1989 | 1.97 m (6 ft 6 in) | 98 kg (216 lb) | 355 cm (140 in) | outside hitter |
| 8 | (Poland) Andrzej Wrona | 27 December 1988 | 2.06 m (6 ft 9 in) | 96 kg (212 lb) | 355 cm (140 in) | middle blocker |
| 9 | (Poland) Maciej Muzaj | 21 May 1994 | 2.08 m (6 ft 10 in) | 88 kg (194 lb) | 379 cm (149 in) | opposite |
| 10 | (Argentina) Nicolás Uriarte | 21 March 1990 | 1.89 m (6 ft 2 in) | 87 kg (192 lb) | 340 cm (130 in) | setter |
| 11 | (France) Stephane Antiga | 3 February 1976 | 2.00 m (6 ft 7 in) | 100 kg (220 lb) | 344 cm (135 in) | outside hitter |
| 12 | (Poland) Wojciech Włodarczyk | 28 October 1990 | 2.00 m (6 ft 7 in) | 88 kg (194 lb) | 348 cm (137 in) | outside hitter |
| 15 | (Serbia) Aleksa Brđović | 29 July 1993 | 2.04 m (6 ft 8 in) | 90 kg (200 lb) | 355 cm (140 in) | setter |
| 16 | (Poland) Paweł Zatorski | 21 June 1990 | 1.84 m (6 ft 0 in) | 73 kg (161 lb) | 328 cm (129 in) | libero |
| 17 | (Poland) Jędrzej Maćkowiak | 17 October 1992 | 0 m (0 in) | 0 kg (0 lb) | 0 cm (0 in) | middle blocker |
| 18 | (Poland) Dawid Konieczny | 30 August 1994 | 1.97 m (6 ft 6 in) | 90 kg (200 lb) | 335 cm (132 in) | outside hitter |

== 2012/2013 ==
The following is the PGE Skra Bełchatów roster in the 2012–13 PlusLiga.

| Head coach: | (Poland) Jacek Nawrocki |
| Assistant: | (Poland) Maciej Bartodziejski |

| No. | Name | Date of birth | Height | Weight | Spike | Position |
|---|---|---|---|---|---|---|
| 1 | (Poland) Bartosz Cedzyński | 20 December 1990 | 0 m (0 in) | 0 kg (0 lb) | 0 cm (0 in) | outside hitter |
| 2 | (Poland) Mariusz Wlazły (C) | 4 August 1983 | 1.94 m (6 ft 4 in) | 80 kg (180 lb) | 365 cm (144 in) | outside hitter |
| 3 | (Poland) Łukasz Zugaj | 27 January 1993 | 1.92 m (6 ft 4 in) | 99 kg (218 lb) | 345 cm (136 in) | setter |
| 4 | (Poland) Daniel Pliński | 10 December 1978 | 2.04 m (6 ft 8 in) | 100 kg (220 lb) | 330 cm (130 in) | middle blocker |
| 5 | (Netherlands) Wytze Kooistra | 3 June 1982 | 2.09 m (6 ft 10 in) | 102 kg (225 lb) | 360 cm (140 in) | middle blocker |
| 6 | (Poland) Karol Kłos | 8 August 1989 | 2.01 m (6 ft 7 in) | 87 kg (192 lb) | 355 cm (140 in) | middle blocker |
| 7 | (Poland) Kacper Turoboś | 12 June 1993 | 1.82 m (6 ft 0 in) | 78 kg (172 lb) | 326 cm (128 in) | libero |
| 8 | (Serbia) Konstantin Čupković | 2 January 1987 | 2.05 m (6 ft 9 in) | 89 kg (196 lb) | 360 cm (140 in) | outside hitter |
| 9 | (Slovenia) Dejan Vinčić | 15 September 1986 | 2.02 m (6 ft 8 in) | 95 kg (209 lb) | 343 cm (135 in) | setter |
| 9 | (Poland) Maciej Muzaj | 21 May 1994 | 2.08 m (6 ft 10 in) | 88 kg (194 lb) | 379 cm (149 in) | opposite |
| 10 | (Italy) Dante Boninfante | 7 March 1977 | 1.88 m (6 ft 2 in) | 0 kg (0 lb) | 334 cm (131 in) | setter |
| 12 | (Poland) Paweł Woicki | 19 June 1983 | 1.82 m (6 ft 0 in) | 84 kg (185 lb) | 315 cm (124 in) | setter |
| 13 | (Poland) Michał Winiarski | 28 September 1983 | 2.00 m (6 ft 7 in) | 82 kg (181 lb) | 345 cm (136 in) | outside hitter |
| 14 | (Serbia) Aleksandar Atanasijević | 4 September 1991 | 2.00 m (6 ft 7 in) | 92 kg (203 lb) | 350 cm (140 in) | opposite |
| 15 | (Poland) Michał Koźmiński | 28 January 1992 | 1.89 m (6 ft 2 in) | 80 kg (180 lb) | 333 cm (131 in) | outside hitter |
| 16 | (Poland) Paweł Zatorski | 21 June 1990 | 1.84 m (6 ft 0 in) | 73 kg (161 lb) | 328 cm (129 in) | libero |
| 17 | (Poland) Jędrzej Maćkowiak | 17 October 1992 | 0 m (0 in) | 0 kg (0 lb) | 0 cm (0 in) | middle blocker |
| 18 | (Poland) Michał Bąkiewicz | 22 March 1981 | 1.97 m (6 ft 6 in) | 93 kg (205 lb) | 339 cm (133 in) | outside hitter |

== 2011/2012 ==
The following is the PGE Skra Bełchatów roster in the 2011–12 PlusLiga.

| Head coach: | (Poland) Jacek Nawrocki |
| Assistant: | (Poland) Maciej Bartodziejski |

| No. | Name | Date of birth | Height | Weight | Spike | Position |
|---|---|---|---|---|---|---|
| 1 | (Poland) Damian Wdowiak | 4 May 1992 | 1.98 m (6 ft 6 in) | 92 kg (203 lb) | 345 cm (136 in) | opposite |
| 2 | (Poland) Mariusz Wlazły (C) | 4 August 1983 | 1.94 m (6 ft 4 in) | 80 kg (180 lb) | 365 cm (144 in) | opposite |
| 3 | (Poland) Bartosz Cedzyński | 20 December 1990 | 0 m (0 in) | 0 kg (0 lb) | 0 cm (0 in) | outside hitter |
| 4 | (Poland) Daniel Pliński | 10 December 1978 | 2.04 m (6 ft 8 in) | 100 kg (220 lb) | 330 cm (130 in) | middle blocker |
| 5 | (Netherlands) Wytze Kooistra | 3 June 1982 | 2.09 m (6 ft 10 in) | 102 kg (225 lb) | 360 cm (140 in) | middle blocker |
| 6 | (Poland) Karol Kłos | 8 August 1989 | 2.01 m (6 ft 7 in) | 87 kg (192 lb) | 355 cm (140 in) | middle blocker |
| 7 | (Poland) Bartosz Kurek | 29 August 1988 | 2.05 m (6 ft 9 in) | 105 kg (231 lb) | 375 cm (148 in) | outside hitter |
| 8 | (Poland) Robert Milczarek | 28 November 1983 | 1.88 m (6 ft 2 in) | 78 kg (172 lb) | 340 cm (130 in) | libero |
| 9 | (Serbia) Konstantin Čupković | 2 January 1987 | 2.05 m (6 ft 9 in) | 89 kg (196 lb) | 360 cm (140 in) | outside hitter |
| 10 | (Spain) Miguel Ángel Falasca | 29 April 1973 | 1.94 m (6 ft 4 in) | 94 kg (207 lb) | 344 cm (135 in) | setter |
| 11 | (Poland) Marcin Janusz | 31 July 1994 | 1.91 m (6 ft 3 in) | 81 kg (179 lb) | 326 cm (128 in) | setter |
| 12 | (Poland) Paweł Woicki | 19 June 1983 | 1.82 m (6 ft 0 in) | 84 kg (185 lb) | 315 cm (124 in) | setter |
| 13 | (Poland) Michał Winiarski | 28 September 1983 | 2.00 m (6 ft 7 in) | 82 kg (181 lb) | 345 cm (136 in) | outside hitter |
| 14 | (Serbia) Aleksandar Atanasijević | 4 September 1991 | 2.00 m (6 ft 7 in) | 92 kg (203 lb) | 350 cm (140 in) | opposite |
| 16 | (Poland) Paweł Zatorski | 21 June 1990 | 1.84 m (6 ft 0 in) | 73 kg (161 lb) | 328 cm (129 in) | libero |
| 17 | (Poland) Marcin Możdżonek | 9 February 1985 | 2.11 m (6 ft 11 in) | 104 kg (229 lb) | 360 cm (140 in) | middle blocker |
| 18 | (Poland) Michał Bąkiewicz | 22 March 1981 | 1.97 m (6 ft 6 in) | 93 kg (205 lb) | 339 cm (133 in) | outside hitter |

== 2010/2011 ==
The following is the PGE Skra Bełchatów roster in the 2010–11 PlusLiga.

| Head coach: | (Poland) Jacek Nawrocki |
| Assistant: | (Poland) Maciej Bartodziejski |

| No. | Name | Date of birth | Height | Weight | Spike | Position |
|---|---|---|---|---|---|---|
| 1 | (Poland) Grzegorz Bociek | 6 June 1991 | 2.07 m (6 ft 9 in) | 107 kg (236 lb) | 367 cm (144 in) | opposite |
| 2 | (Poland) Mariusz Wlazły (C) | 4 August 1983 | 1.94 m (6 ft 4 in) | 80 kg (180 lb) | 365 cm (144 in) | opposite |
| 3 | (Poland) Bartosz Cedzyński | 20 December 1990 | 0 m (0 in) | 0 kg (0 lb) | 0 cm (0 in) | middle blocker |
| 4 | (Poland) Daniel Pliński | 10 December 1978 | 2.04 m (6 ft 8 in) | 100 kg (220 lb) | 330 cm (130 in) | middle blocker |
| 5 | (Czech Republic) Jakub Novotný | 20 April 1979 | 1.96 m (6 ft 5 in) | 87 kg (192 lb) | 345 cm (136 in) | opposite |
| 6 | (Poland) Karol Kłos | 8 August 1989 | 2.01 m (6 ft 7 in) | 87 kg (192 lb) | 355 cm (140 in) | middle blocker |
| 7 | (Poland) Bartosz Kurek | 29 August 1988 | 2.05 m (6 ft 9 in) | 105 kg (231 lb) | 375 cm (148 in) | outside hitter |
| 8 | (Poland) Maciej Krzywiecki | 27 October 1989 | 1.90 m (6 ft 3 in) | 82 kg (181 lb) | 340 cm (130 in) | outside hitter |
| 9 | (Poland) Michał Mysera | 12 October 1988 | 2.05 m (6 ft 9 in) | 93 kg (205 lb) | 343 cm (135 in) | middle blocker |
| 10 | (Spain) Miguel Ángel Falasca | 29 April 1973 | 1.94 m (6 ft 4 in) | 94 kg (207 lb) | 344 cm (135 in) | setter |
| 11 | (France) Stephane Antiga | 3 February 1976 | 2.00 m (6 ft 7 in) | 100 kg (220 lb) | 344 cm (135 in) | outside hitter |
| 12 | (Poland) Paweł Woicki | 19 June 1983 | 1.82 m (6 ft 0 in) | 84 kg (185 lb) | 315 cm (124 in) | setter |
| 13 | (Poland) Michał Winiarski | 28 September 1983 | 2.00 m (6 ft 7 in) | 82 kg (181 lb) | 345 cm (136 in) | outside hitter |
| 14 | (Poland) Radosław Wnuk | 25 September 1978 | 2.07 m (6 ft 9 in) | 104 kg (229 lb) | 345 cm (136 in) | middle blocker |
| 15 | (Poland) Łukasz Szablewski | 5 October 1988 | 2.04 m (6 ft 8 in) | 98 kg (216 lb) | 335 cm (132 in) | setter |
| 16 | (Poland) Paweł Zatorski | 21 June 1990 | 1.84 m (6 ft 0 in) | 73 kg (161 lb) | 328 cm (129 in) | libero |
| 17 | (Poland) Marcin Możdżonek | 9 February 1985 | 2.11 m (6 ft 11 in) | 104 kg (229 lb) | 360 cm (140 in) | middle blocker |
| 18 | (Poland) Michał Bąkiewicz | 22 March 1981 | 1.97 m (6 ft 6 in) | 93 kg (205 lb) | 339 cm (133 in) | outside hitter |

== 2009/2010 ==
The following is the PGE Skra Bełchatów roster in the 2009–10 PlusLiga.

| Head coach: | (Poland) Jacek Nawrocki |
| Assistant: | (Poland) Maciej Bartodziejski |

| No. | Name | Date of birth | Height | Weight | Spike | Position |
|---|---|---|---|---|---|---|
| 1 | (Poland) Maciej Dobrowolski | 19 March 1977 | 1.90 m (6 ft 3 in) | 86 kg (190 lb) | 326 cm (128 in) | setter |
| 2 | (Poland) Mariusz Wlazły (C) | 4 August 1983 | 1.94 m (6 ft 4 in) | 80 kg (180 lb) | 365 cm (144 in) | opposite |
| 3 | (Poland) Piotr Gacek | 16 September 1978 | 1.85 m (6 ft 1 in) | 80 kg (180 lb) | 0 cm (0 in) | libero |
| 4 | (Poland) Daniel Pliński | 10 December 1978 | 2.04 m (6 ft 8 in) | 100 kg (220 lb) | 330 cm (130 in) | middle blocker |
| 5 | (Czech Republic) Jakub Novotný | 20 April 1979 | 1.96 m (6 ft 5 in) | 87 kg (192 lb) | 345 cm (136 in) | opposite |
| 6 | (Poland) Miłosz Hebda | 11 March 1991 | 2.06 m (6 ft 9 in) | 89 kg (196 lb) | 350 cm (140 in) | opposite |
| 7 | (Poland) Bartosz Kurek | 29 August 1988 | 2.05 m (6 ft 9 in) | 105 kg (231 lb) | 375 cm (148 in) | outside hitter |
| 8 | (Poland) Filip Frankowski | 7 May 1990 | 0 m (0 in) | 0 kg (0 lb) | 0 cm (0 in) | outside hitter |
| 10 | (Spain) Miguel Ángel Falasca | 29 April 1973 | 1.94 m (6 ft 4 in) | 94 kg (207 lb) | 344 cm (135 in) | setter |
| 11 | (France) Stephane Antiga | 3 February 1976 | 2.00 m (6 ft 7 in) | 100 kg (220 lb) | 344 cm (135 in) | outside hitter |
| 12 | (Poland) Radosław Kolanek | 21 July 1986 | 2.04 m (6 ft 8 in) | 105 kg (231 lb) | 345 cm (136 in) | middle blocker |
| 13 | (Poland) Michał Winiarski | 28 September 1983 | 2.00 m (6 ft 7 in) | 82 kg (181 lb) | 345 cm (136 in) | outside hitter |
| 14 | (Poland) Radosław Wnuk | 25 September 1978 | 2.07 m (6 ft 9 in) | 104 kg (229 lb) | 345 cm (136 in) | middle blocker |
| 15 | (Poland) Igor Walczykowski | 21 June 1990 | 2.01 m (6 ft 7 in) | 89 kg (196 lb) | 336 cm (132 in) | opposite |
| 16 | (Poland) Bartosz Cedzyński | 20 December 1990 | 0 m (0 in) | 0 kg (0 lb) | 0 cm (0 in) | opposite |
| 17 | (Poland) Marcin Możdżonek | 9 February 1985 | 2.11 m (6 ft 11 in) | 104 kg (229 lb) | 360 cm (140 in) | middle blocker |
| 18 | (Poland) Michał Bąkiewicz | 22 March 1981 | 1.97 m (6 ft 6 in) | 93 kg (205 lb) | 339 cm (133 in) | outside hitter |

== 2008/2009 ==
The following is the PGE Skra Bełchatów roster in the 2008–09 PlusLiga.

| Head coach: | (Argentina) Daniel Castellani |
| Assistant: | (Poland) Jacek Nawrocki |

| No. | Name | Date of birth | Height | Weight | Spike | Position |
|---|---|---|---|---|---|---|
| 1 | (Poland) Maciej Dobrowolski | 19 March 1977 | 1.90 m (6 ft 3 in) | 86 kg (190 lb) | 326 cm (128 in) | setter |
| 2 | (Poland) Mariusz Wlazły (C) | 4 August 1983 | 1.94 m (6 ft 4 in) | 80 kg (180 lb) | 365 cm (144 in) | opposite |
| 3 | (Poland) Piotr Gacek | 16 September 1978 | 1.85 m (6 ft 1 in) | 80 kg (180 lb) | 0 cm (0 in) | libero |
| 4 | (Poland) Daniel Pliński | 10 December 1978 | 2.04 m (6 ft 8 in) | 100 kg (220 lb) | 330 cm (130 in) | middle blocker |
| 5 | (Finland) Janne Heikkinen | 11 April 1976 | 2.04 m (6 ft 8 in) | 106 kg (234 lb) | 351 cm (138 in) | middle blocker |
| 6 | (Poland) Dawid Murek | 24 July 1977 | 1.95 m (6 ft 5 in) | 100 kg (220 lb) | 337 cm (133 in) | outside hitter |
| 7 | (Poland) Bartosz Kurek | 29 August 1988 | 2.05 m (6 ft 9 in) | 105 kg (231 lb) | 375 cm (148 in) | outside hitter |
| 8 | (Poland) Jakub Jarosz | 10 February 1987 | 1.97 m (6 ft 6 in) | 91 kg (201 lb) | 360 cm (140 in) | opposite |
| 9 | (Poland) Paweł Maciejewicz | 29 January 1980 | 0 m (0 in) | 0 kg (0 lb) | 0 cm (0 in) | outside hitter |
| 10 | (Spain) Miguel Ángel Falasca | 29 April 1973 | 1.94 m (6 ft 4 in) | 94 kg (207 lb) | 344 cm (135 in) | setter |
| 11 | (France) Stephane Antiga | 3 February 1976 | 2.00 m (6 ft 7 in) | 100 kg (220 lb) | 344 cm (135 in) | outside hitter |
| 14 | (Poland) Radosław Wnuk | 25 September 1978 | 2.07 m (6 ft 9 in) | 104 kg (229 lb) | 345 cm (136 in) | middle blocker |
| 17 | (Poland) Marcin Możdżonek | 9 February 1985 | 2.11 m (6 ft 11 in) | 104 kg (229 lb) | 360 cm (140 in) | middle blocker |
| 18 | (Poland) Michał Bąkiewicz | 22 March 1981 | 1.97 m (6 ft 6 in) | 93 kg (205 lb) | 339 cm (133 in) | outside hitter |

== 2007/2008 ==
The following is the PGE Skra Bełchatów roster in the 2007–08 Polish Volleyball League.

| Head coach: | (Argentina) Daniel Castellani |
| Assistant: | (Poland) Jacek Nawrocki |

| No. | Name | Date of birth | Height | Weight | Spike | Position |
|---|---|---|---|---|---|---|
| 1 | (Poland) Maciej Dobrowolski | 19 March 1977 | 1.90 m (6 ft 3 in) | 86 kg (190 lb) | 326 cm (128 in) | setter |
| 2 | (Poland) Mariusz Wlazły | 4 August 1983 | 1.94 m (6 ft 4 in) | 80 kg (180 lb) | 365 cm (144 in) | opposite |
| 3 | (Poland) Krzysztof Stelmach (C) | 11 November 1967 | 1.98 m (6 ft 6 in) | 96 kg (212 lb) | 320 cm (130 in) | outside hitter |
| 4 | (Poland) Piotr Gruszka | 8 March 1977 | 2.06 m (6 ft 9 in) | 109 kg (240 lb) | 354 cm (139 in) | outside hitter |
| 5 | (Finland) Janne Heikkinen | 11 April 1976 | 2.04 m (6 ft 8 in) | 106 kg (234 lb) | 351 cm (138 in) | middle blocker |
| 6 | (Canada) Daniel Lewis | 3 April 1976 | 1.89 m (6 ft 2 in) | 90 kg (200 lb) | 340 cm (130 in) | outside hitter |
| 7 | (Poland) Dominik Witczak | 2 January 1983 | 1.98 m (6 ft 6 in) | 105 kg (231 lb) | 340 cm (130 in) | opposite |
| 8 | (Brazil) Alex Damião | 1 January 1970 | 2.08 m (6 ft 10 in) | 105 kg (231 lb) | 335 cm (132 in) | opposite |
| 9 | (Poland) Paweł Maciejewicz | 29 January 1980 | 0 m (0 in) | 0 kg (0 lb) | 0 cm (0 in) | outside hitter |
| 10 | (Poland) Daniel Pliński | 10 December 1978 | 2.04 m (6 ft 8 in) | 100 kg (220 lb) | 330 cm (130 in) | middle blocker |
| 11 | (France) Stephane Antiga | 3 February 1976 | 2.00 m (6 ft 7 in) | 100 kg (220 lb) | 344 cm (135 in) | outside hitter |
| 13 | (Poland) Robert Milczarek | 28 November 1983 | 1.88 m (6 ft 2 in) | 78 kg (172 lb) | 340 cm (130 in) | libero |
| 14 | (Poland) Radosław Wnuk | 25 September 1978 | 2.07 m (6 ft 9 in) | 104 kg (229 lb) | 345 cm (136 in) | middle blocker |
| 15 | (Poland) Bartłomiej Neroj | 22 November 1984 | 2.00 m (6 ft 7 in) | 98 kg (216 lb) | 338 cm (133 in) | setter |
| 17 | (Poland) Mikołaj Sarnecki | 29 July 1987 | 0 m (0 in) | 0 kg (0 lb) | 0 cm (0 in) | outside hitter |
| 18 | (Poland) Michał Bąkiewicz | 22 March 1981 | 1.97 m (6 ft 6 in) | 93 kg (205 lb) | 339 cm (133 in) | outside hitter |

== 2006/2007 ==
The following is the BOT Skra Bełchatów roster in the 2006–07 Polish Volleyball League.

| Head coach: | (Argentina) Daniel Castellani |
| Assistant: | (Poland) Jacek Nawrocki |

| No. | Name | Date of birth | Height | Weight | Spike | Position |
|---|---|---|---|---|---|---|
| 1 | (Poland) Maciej Dobrowolski | 19 March 1977 | 1.90 m (6 ft 3 in) | 86 kg (190 lb) | 326 cm (128 in) | setter |
| 2 | (Poland) Mariusz Wlazły | 4 August 1983 | 1.94 m (6 ft 4 in) | 80 kg (180 lb) | 365 cm (144 in) | opposite |
| 3 | (Poland) Krzysztof Stelmach (C) | 11 November 1967 | 1.98 m (6 ft 6 in) | 96 kg (212 lb) | 320 cm (130 in) | outside hitter |
| 4 | (Poland) Piotr Gruszka | 8 March 1977 | 2.06 m (6 ft 9 in) | 109 kg (240 lb) | 354 cm (139 in) | outside hitter |
| 5 | (Finland) Janne Heikkinen | 11 April 1976 | 2.04 m (6 ft 8 in) | 106 kg (234 lb) | 351 cm (138 in) | middle blocker |
| 6 | (Canada) Daniel Lewis | 3 April 1976 | 1.89 m (6 ft 2 in) | 90 kg (200 lb) | 340 cm (130 in) | outside hitter |
| 7 | (Bulgaria) Evgeni Ivanov | 3 June 1974 | 2.10 m (6 ft 11 in) | 98 kg (216 lb) | 329 cm (130 in) | middle blocker |
| 9 | (Poland) Paweł Maciejewicz | 29 January 1980 | 0 m (0 in) | 0 kg (0 lb) | 0 cm (0 in) | outside hitter |
| 10 | (Poland) Robert Milczarek | 28 November 1983 | 1.88 m (6 ft 2 in) | 78 kg (172 lb) | 340 cm (130 in) | libero |
| 14 | (Poland) Radosław Wnuk | 25 September 1978 | 2.07 m (6 ft 9 in) | 104 kg (229 lb) | 345 cm (136 in) | middle blocker |
| 15 | (Poland) Bartłomiej Neroj | 22 November 1984 | 2.00 m (6 ft 7 in) | 98 kg (216 lb) | 338 cm (133 in) | setter |
| 16 | (Poland) Krzysztof Ignaczak | 15 May 1978 | 1.88 m (6 ft 2 in) | 86 kg (190 lb) | 336 cm (132 in) | libero |
| 17 | (Poland) Michał Chadała | 15 October 1977 | 1.96 m (6 ft 5 in) | 95 kg (209 lb) | 320 cm (130 in) | outside hitter |
