= Pärtelpoeg =

Pärtelpoeg is an Estonian surname. Notable people with the surname include:

- Hugo Pärtelpoeg (1899–1951), Estonian lawyer and politician
- Ilmar Pärtelpoeg (1926–2013), Estonian ski jumper, economist, computer scientist, and politician
- Leila Pärtelpoeg (1927–2025), Estonian interior architect and pedagog

== See also ==
- Madis Pärtel (born 1985), Estonian diplomat and former volleyball player
