= Janne Heikkinen (volleyball) =

Finnish volleyball player (born 1976)

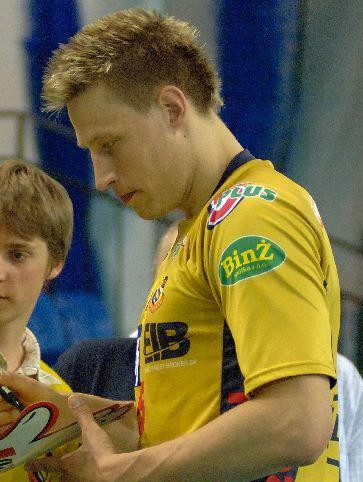

Personal information
- Full name: Janne Heikkinen
- Nationality: Finnish
- Born: 11 April 1976 (age 50); Kajaani, Finland
- Height: 2.04 m (6 ft 8 in)
- Weight: 0 kg (0 lb)
- Spike: 351 cm (138 in)
- Block: 328 cm (129 in)

Volleyball information
- Position: Middle blocker

Career
Years	Teams
1993–1998; 1998–1999; 1999–2001; 2001–2002; 2002–2003; 2003–2004; 2004–2005; 2005–2006; 2006–2009	Raision Loimu; CV Las Palmas; CUS Torino Pallavolo; Olympiacos Piraeus; Sira Cucine Ancône; Aon hotVolleys Vienna; Südtirol Alto Adige Bolzano; Martina Franca Volley; PGE Skra Bełchatów

National team
1993–2009	Finland
- Last updated: 19 February 2017

Janne Heikkinen (born 11 April 1976) is a Finnish former volleyball player, a member of Finnish national team in 1993–2009.

== Career ==
=== Clubs ===
He started his career in his home town Kajaani with his brother. When he was sixteen years old he moved to Tampere and started study in Varala sport high school. Heikkinen made his debut in Finland volleyball league year 1993. He was seventeen-year-old youth player. He won on his first season in Raision Loimu bronze medal of Finnish Championship. Same year he was in youth World Championships were Finland played history best result, 4. place. After season media chose him best newcomer player in the league. Heikkinen played in Raision Loimu seasons 1993–1998. In his last season he won Finland league champion. After many seasons in Finland volleyball league Heikkinen made professional contract with CV Las Palmas. He was 22 years old and won silver medal of Spanish Championship. In 1999 he signed a contract with Italian team – CUS Torino Pallavolo. Last season in Torino, Heikkinen won with his team Italian A2-Cup silver medal. After two season, in 2001 Heikkinen moved to Greece and started play in Olympiacos Piraeus. He won silver medal of the Champions League and silver of Greek Championship. After one season Heikkinen came back to Italy. He played season 2002–2003 in Italy A1-league. He did not got achievements on Sira Cucine Ancône, so he moved away. In 2003 made contract with Aon hotVolleys Vienna. Season was success to him and his team. They won title of Austrian Champion. Season 2004/2005 Heikkinen played in Alto Bolzano. He did not got there any achievements. He played season 2005/2006 in Martina Franca Volley. In 2006 moved to PlusLiga, to Polish club Skra Bełchatów. He won with Polish team three titles of Polish Champion (2007, 2008, 2009) and two Polish Cups – in 2007 and 2009. In season 2007/2008 won with club bronze medal of Champions League. He ended his career in 2009.

=== National team ===
Heikkinen debuted in Finnish national team as 17-year-old player against Croatia in the World Championships qualification. Best result of Finnish team was fourth place in the European Championship 2007.

== Sporting achievements ==
=== Clubs ===
==== CEV Champions League ====
- 2001/2002 – with Olympiacos Piraeus
- 2007/2008 – with PGE Skra Bełchatów

==== National championships ====
- 1993/1994 Finnish Championship, with Raision Loimu
- 1996/1997 Finnish Championship, with Raision Loimu
- 1998/1999 Spanish Championship, with CV Las Palmas
- 2001/2002 Greek Championship, with Olympiacos Piraeus
- 2003/2004 Austrian Championship, with Aon hotVolleys Vienna
- 2006/2007 Polish Cup, with BOT Skra Bełchatów
- 2006/2007 Polish Championship, with BOT Skra Bełchatów
- 2007/2008 Polish Championship, with PGE Skra Bełchatów
- 2008/2009 Polish Cup, with PGE Skra Bełchatów
- 2008/2009 Polish Championship, with PGE Skra Bełchatów
