= Simo-Pekka Olli =

Finnish volleyball player (born 1985)

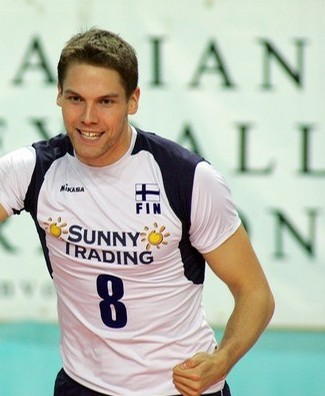

Personal information
- Full name: Simo-Pekka Olli
- Born: 13 November 1985 (age 41) Varkaus, Finland
- Height: 2.04 m (6 ft 8 in)

Volleyball information
- Position: Setter
- Current club: Raision Loimu

Career
- Years: Team
- 2005–2006 2005–2006 2006–2007 2007–2008 2008–2009: Raision Loimu; Padova Volley; Bergamo Volley; Padova Volley; Raision Loimu

National team
- Years: Team
- 4 years: Finland

Simo-Pekka Olli (born November 13, 1985) is a professional volleyball player from Finland.

He has played three seasons in Italy A1-league. Sempre Volley Padua was his club years 2005–2008. After that he came back to Finland because he must perform military service. In Finland military service is mandatory for all men.

== Career ==
Olli started his career as a fourteen-year-old in Varkaus. First he played middle-blocker but the youth national teams coach saw his good set and moved him to setter. His first season in Finland Champion league was 2004–2005. He played in Raision Loimu where he won Finland Cup-Champion and became 4th place in the league. In Raisio Loimu played at the same time as brothers Mikko and Matti Oivanen. After one season in Finland he signed a contract with Italy A1-league.

The team was Sempre Volley Padova where set too other Finland player Mikko Esko. After one season in Padova Olli changed his team to Bergamo Volley. Olli was credit in Bergamo because he had three years contract with Padova. After Bergamo year Olli come back to Padova and played his last contract season.

== National team ==
Olli played his first national team game in summer 2005. Finland played European league then and come second place in league. The league jury chose Olli best setter in league that year. Now Olli has 30 national team games.

== Palmares ==
Personal

- European league-best setter 2005
- Best youth player in Finland 2003

Team

- 4th place in European Championships 2007
- Finland Cup-Champion 2004, 2014
- Finland Volleyball League 3. (2010), 2. (2014)

== Teams ==
- 2004–2005 Raision Loimu (FIN)
- 2005–2008 Sempre Volley Padova (ITA)
- 2008–2011 Raision Loimu (FIN)
- 2011–2012 Fenice Volley Isernia (ITA)
- 2011–2012 Volley Tonno Callipo (ITA)
- 2012–2013 Raision Loimu (FIN)
- 2013–2014 Kokkolan Tiikerit (FIN)
