= Tomáš Fila =

Czech volleyball player (born 1985)

Tomas Fila
Personal information
- Nationality: Czech
- Born: 12 July 1985 (age 41)
- Height: 198 cm (6 ft 6 in)
- Weight: 95 kg (209 lb)
- Spike: 348 cm (137 in)
- Block: 320 cm (126 in)

Volleyball information
- Number: 22 (national team)

Career
- Years: Team
- 2015: VK Ceske Budejovice

National team
- Years: Team
- 2015: Czech Republic

Tomas Fila (born 12 July 1985) is a Czech male volleyball player. He is part of the Czech Republic men's national volleyball team. On club level he plays for VK Ceske Budejovice.
