= Francesc Llenas =

Spanish volleyball player (born 1982)

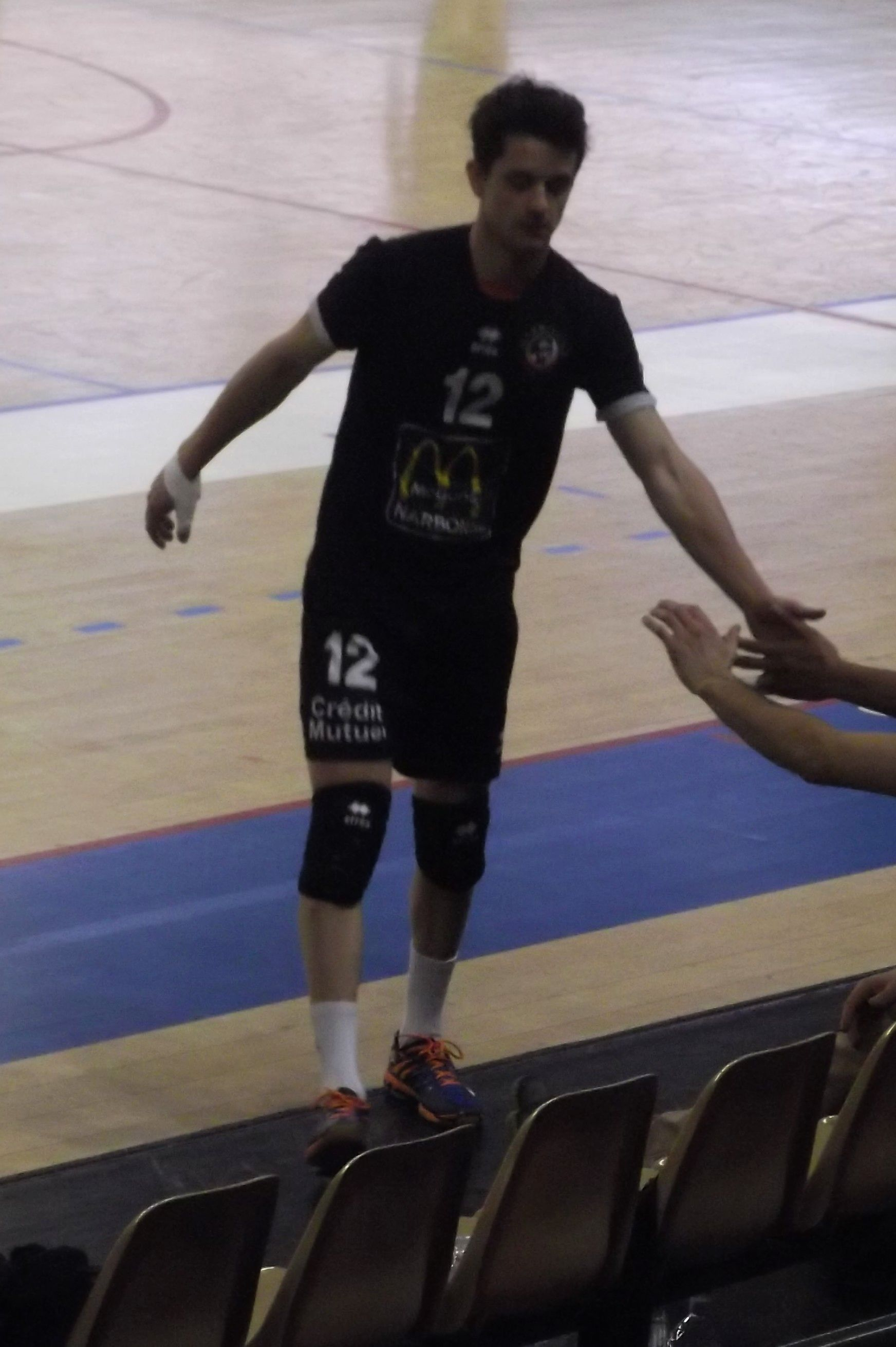

Personal information
- Full name: Francesc Llenas Sabanes
- Nationality: Spanish
- Born: 13 September 1982 (age 44)
- Height: 186 m (610 ft 3 in)
- Weight: 72 kg (159 lb)
- Spike: 325 cm (128 in)
- Block: 300 cm (118 in)

Volleyball information
- Number: 12

Career
Years	Teams
2010	Narbonne (FRA)

National team
2010	Spain

Francesc Llenas (born 13 September 1982) is a retired Spanish male volleyball player. He was part of the Spain men's national volleyball team at the 2010 FIVB Volleyball Men's World Championship in Italy. He played for Narbonne (FRA).

== Clubs ==
- Narbonne (FRA) (2010)
