= Jan Václavík =

Czech volleyball player (born 1985)

Jan Vaclavik

Personal information
- Nationality: Czech
- Born: 15 April 1985 (age 41)
- Height: 180 cm (5 ft 11 in)
- Weight: 73 kg (161 lb)
- Spike: 315 cm (124 in)
- Block: 295 cm (116 in)

Volleyball information
- Number: 25 (national team)

Career
Years	Teams
2015	VK Ostrava

National team
2015	Czech Republic

Jan Vaclavik (born 15 April 1985) is a Czech male volleyball player. He is part of the Czech Republic men's national volleyball team. On club level he plays for VK Ostrava.

In 2021 he married his girlfriend Míša.
