= Lubomir Agontsev =

Bulgarian volleyball player (born 1987)

Personal information
- Nationality: Bulgarian
- Born: 26 July 1987 (age 39); Montana, Bulgaria
- Height: 190 cm (6 ft 3 in)
- Weight: 87 kg (192 lb)
- Spike: 330 cm (130 in)
- Block: 320 cm (126 in)

Volleyball information
- Number: 23 (national team)

Career
Years	Teams
2015	Montana Volley, Bulgaria

National team
2015-	Bulgaria

Lubomir Agontsev (Bulgarian: Любомир Агонцев) (born 26 July 1987) is a Bulgarian male volleyball player. He is part of the Bulgaria men's national volleyball team. On club level he plays for Montana Volley, Bulgaria.
