= UCAM Murcia =

UCAM Murcia is a Spanish multi-sport club. It may refer to:

- UCAM Murcia CB, the basketball team
- UCAM Murcia CF, their football team
