= Jakub Veselý =

Czech volleyball player (born 1986)

Jakub Vesely
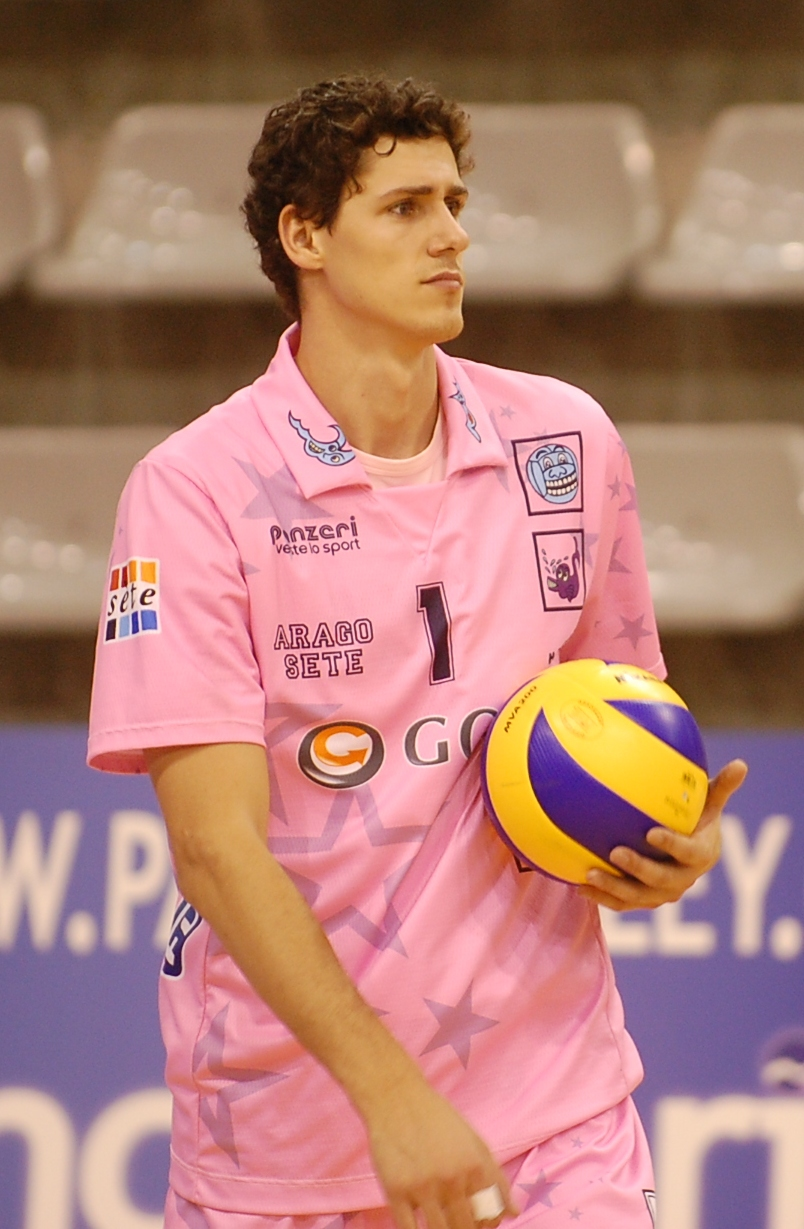

Personal information
- Nationality: Czech
- Born: 2 September 1986 (age 40)
- Height: 206 cm (6 ft 9 in)
- Weight: 94 kg (207 lb)
- Spike: 353 cm (139 in)
- Block: 333 cm (131 in)

Volleyball information
- Number: 12

Career
Years	Teams
2010	Arago de Sette

National team
2010	Czech Republic

Jakub Vesely (born 2 September 1986) is a retired Czech male volleyball player. He was part of the Czech Republic men's national volleyball team at the 2010 FIVB Volleyball Men's World Championship in Italy. He played for Arago de Sette.

== Clubs ==
- Arago de Sette (2010)
