= Raision Loimu =

Finnish volleyball club

Loimu
- Full name: Raision Loimu
- Founded: 1958
- Ground: Kerttula; Raisio, Finland
- Capacity: 1500
- Chairman: (Finland) Jukka Rajakangas
- Head Coach: (Finland) Jani Nieminen
- League: Finland Champion League
- 2009–2010: SM-league, 3. place

Raision Loimu is volleyball team from Finland, based in the city of Raisio. The team has played volleyball in Finland's highest level since 1977. During these years Loimu has won six championships, two silver and six bronze medals. The team won the Finland Cup in 2004.

== Achievements ==
- Finland Champion – 1982, 1983, 1984, 1990, 1997 ja 2001
- Finland league silver – 1980 ja 1981
- Finland league bronze – 1978, 1979, 1985, 1987, 1993, 1994, 2010
- Nordic countries champion 2008
- Finland Cup champion – 2004
- Finland Cup silver – 2005
- Champions league – 1998, 2001

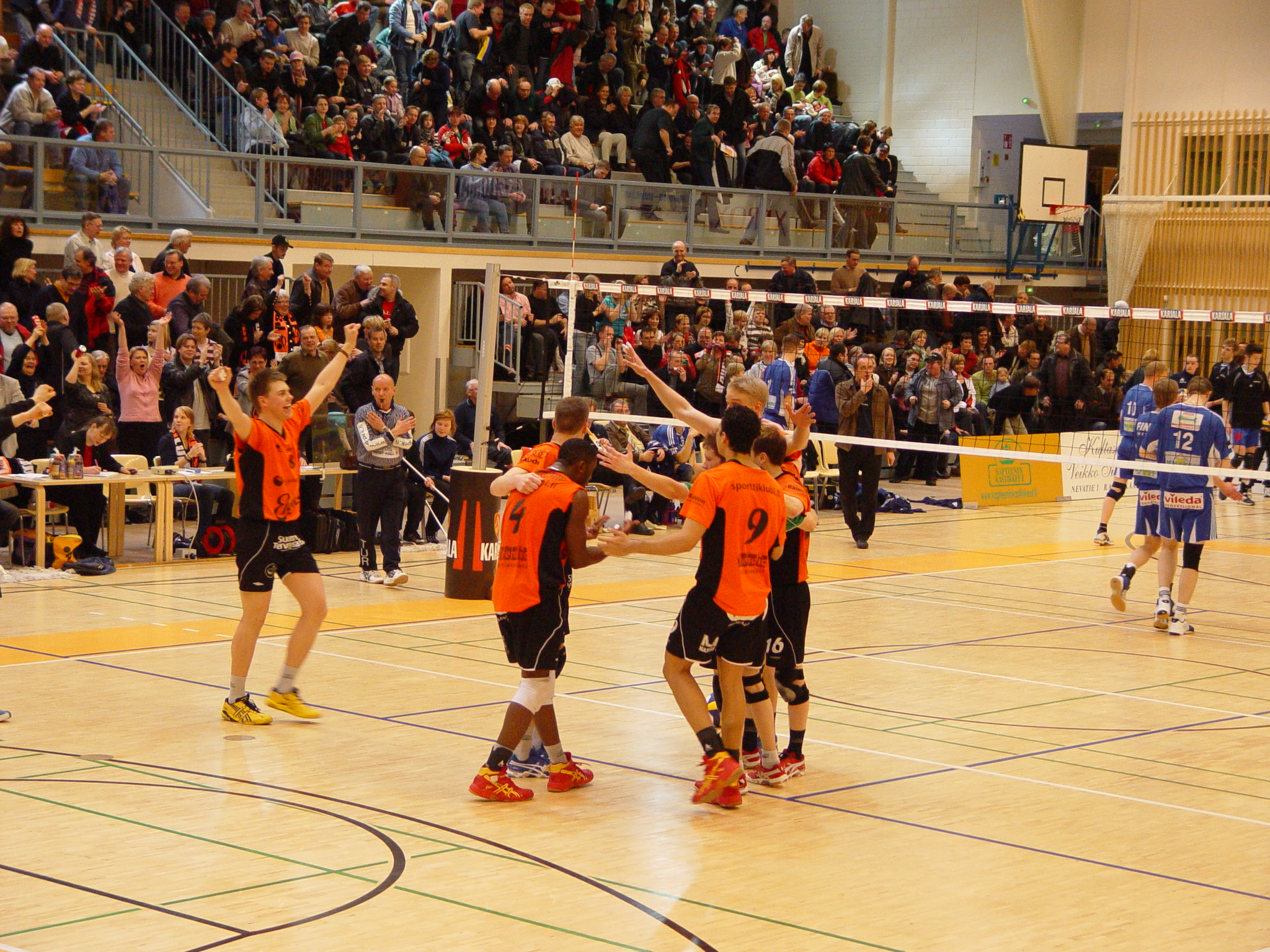

== History ==
Raision Loimu club was founded in 1958. The team rose to the Finland Volleyball league for first time in 1977. After that the team had its first medal season in 1978 with the club earning a bronze medal. Loimu won its first Finland Championship in 1982. After that the team has been Finland Champion six times. They played in the Champions league in 1998 and 2001.

Loimu has had many famous players such as Mikko Oivanen, Matti Oivanen, Simo-Pekka Olli, Tuomas Sammelvuo, Janne Heikkinen, and many others.

== Team ==
=== Season 2010–2011 ===
Setters:

- Simo-Pekka Olli
- Jani Puputti
- Jose Carrasco (VEN)

Middle blockers:

- Kimmo Kutinlahti
- Henri Tuomi (C)
- Juha-Pekka Mikkola

Outside hitters:

- Jimmy Hernandez
- Ossi Rumpunen
- Eemeli Kouki

Opposite:

- Ronald Jimenez (COL)

Libero:

- Dustin Watten (USA)

== Other ==
Loimu's audience arithmetic mean in the 2009–2010 season was 721 per game.

== Famous players ==
- Mikko Oivanen
- Tuomas Sammelvuo
- Janne Heikkinen
- Matti Oivanen
- Viktor Lindberg
- Christophe Achten
- Diego Bonini
- Jukka Rajakangas
- Kai Rumpunen
- Kari Kalin
- Jussi Jokinen
- Jouni Koskela

== See also ==
- Finland volleyball league
