= Rob Bontje =

Dutch volleyball player

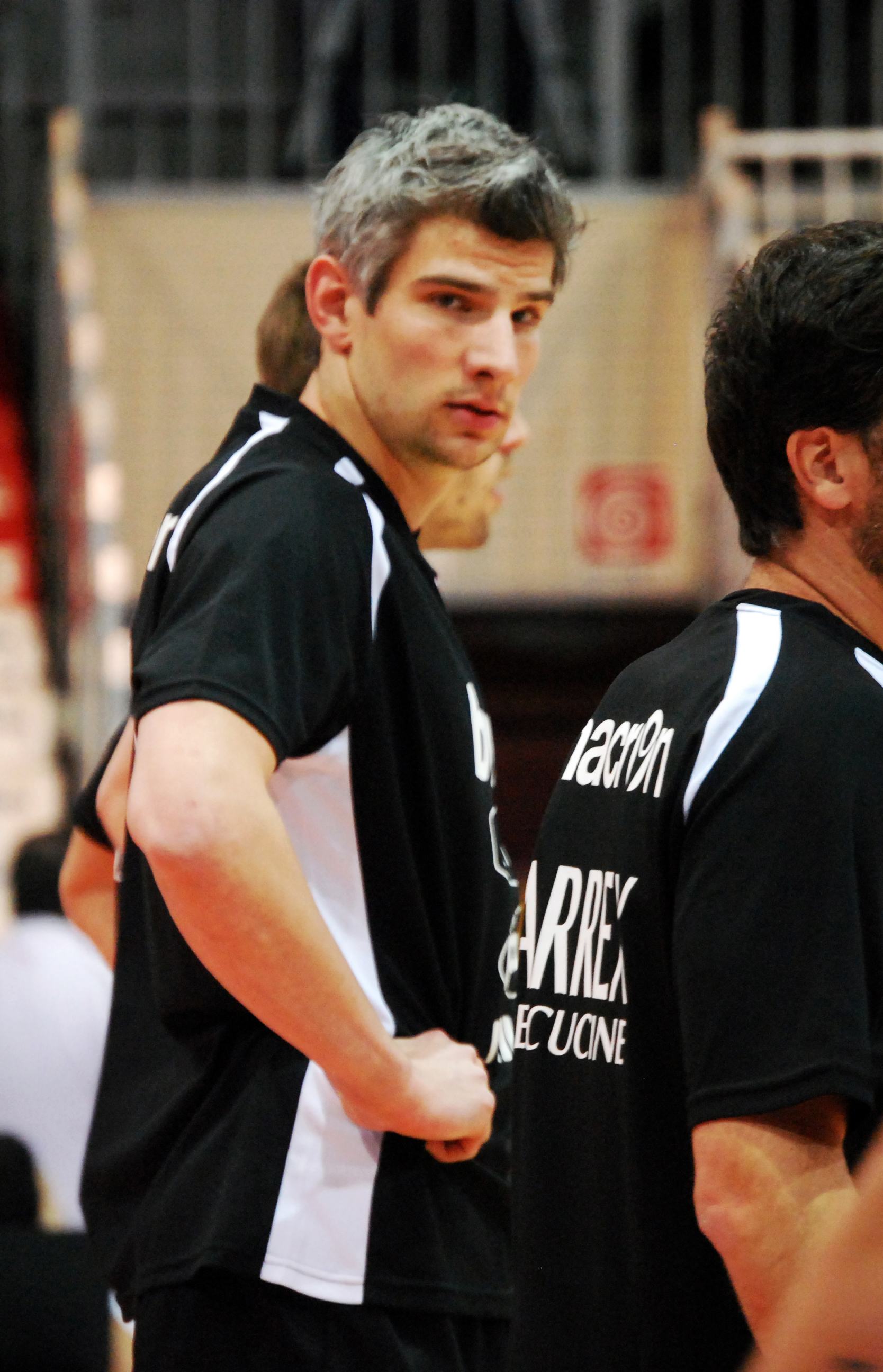

Personal information
- Full name: Johannes Cornelius Bontje
- Nationality: Dutch
- Born: 12 May 1981 (age 45); Grevenbicht, Netherlands
- Height: 2.06 m (6 ft 9 in)
- Weight: 98 kg (216 lb)
- Spike: 360 cm (142 in)
- Block: 340 cm (134 in)

Volleyball information
- Position: Middle blocker
- Current club: VC Limax
- Number: 12

Career
| Years | Teams |
|---|---|
| 2001–2003; 2003–2004; 2004–2005; 2005–2006; 2006–2007; 2007–2008; 2008–2009; 2009–2011; 2011–2014; 2014–2015; 2015–2017; 2017–2020; 2020– | SSS Barneveld; VC Nesselande; Pallavolo Padova; Volley Callipo; BluVolley Verona; Pallavolo Padova; BluVolley Verona; Volley Treviso; Jastrzębski Węgiel; Berlin Recycling Volleys; Noliko Maaseik; Tectum Achel; VC Limax |

National team
| 2003– | Netherlands |
Honours
Men's volleyball
Representing Netherlands
European League
| Gold medal – first place | 2006 Turkey |
| Bronze medal – third place | 2004 Czech Republic |

Johannes Cornelius Bontje, known as Rob Bontje (born 12 May 1981) is a Dutch professional volleyball player, a former member of the Netherlands national team, and a participant in the Olympic Games Athens 2004.

== Honours ==
=== Clubs ===
- FIVB Club World Championship
  - Doha 2011 – with Jastrzębski Węgiel
- CEV Cup
  - 2010/2011 – with Sisley Treviso
- National championships
  - 2003/2004 Dutch Championship, with Ortec Nesselande
  - 2014/2015 German Championship, with Berlin Recycling Volleys
  - 2015/2016 Belgian Championship, with Noliko Maaseik
  - 2016/2017 Belgian SuperCup, with Noliko Maaseik
  - 2016/2017 Belgian Championship, with Noliko Maaseik

=== Individual awards ===
- 2015: CEV Champions League – Best Middle Blocker

Awards
| Preceded by (Russia) Dmitry Muserskiy | Best Middle Blocker of CEV Champions League; 2014/2015 ex aequo (Poland) Piotr Nowakowski | Succeeded by (Argentina) Sebastián Solé (United States) Russell Holmes |
