= VC Nesselande =

Dutch volleyball club

Volleybalclub Nesselande is a Dutch professional volleyball club in Zevenhuizen. The club has been known by various names and continues to be known by the abbreviation ZVH for 'Zevenhuisen'.

== History ==
The club was founded on May 26, 1964 under the name De Zevenklappers and was originally a multi-sport club.

Under the name of ZVH Zevenhuizen, the volleyball team achieved their first success in the 1988–89 season, when they won Netherlands Cup; in the following season they won both the championship and the cup, and they had other successes in national competitions in subsequent years. In 1994 they won their first Netherlands Super Cup.

As Ortec Nesselande, the club reached the final in the 2004–05 CEV Top Teams Cup, where they were defeated by Olympiacos. At the end of the 2010–11 season, due to economic problems, the team was registered in the second division championship.

They have also been known as Rivium Rotterdam and Rentokil ZVH.

== Achievements ==
=== CEV Top Teams Cup ===
Runners-up (1): 2004–05

=== Dutch League ===
Winners (8): 1989–90, 1991–92, 1997–98, 2003–04, 2004–05, 2005–06, 2008–09, 2010–11

=== Dutch Cup ===
Winners (5): 1988–89, 1989–90, 1990–91, 2005–06, 2006–07

=== Dutch SuperCup ===
Winners (5): 1994, 2005, 2009

== Notable players ==
- Brecht Rodenburg, 1996 Olympic gold medallist, as of 2017 assistant coach
- Ingrid Visser, began her career at Zevenhuisen
