= Madis Pärtel =

Estonian volleyball player (born 1985)

Personal information
- Full name: Madis Pärtel
- Nationality: Estonian
- Born: 1 November 1985 (age 40); Estonia
- Height: 1.91 m (6 ft 3 in)
- Weight: 82 kg (181 lb)
- Spike: 340 cm (134 in)
- Block: 310 cm (122 in)

Volleyball information
- Position: Libero

Career
Years	Teams
2009–2016	TTÜ

National team
2015	Estonia (23 games)
- Last updated: 23 April 2018

Madis Pärtel (born 1 November 1985) is a retired Estonian volleyball player, who was a member of the Estonia men's national volleyball team and Estonian club TTÜ. He currently works as a diplomat in agriculture for Estonia to the European Union and is a Hubert H. Humphrey Fellow.

== Estonian national team ==
As a member of the senior Estonia men's national volleyball team, Pärtel competed at the 2015 Men's European Volleyball Championship.

== Sporting achievements ==
=== Clubs ===
Baltic League

- 2012/2013 - with TTÜ
- 2014/2015 - with TTÜ

National championship

- 2012/2013 Estonian Championship, with TTÜ
- 2014/2015 Estonian Championship, with TTÜ

National cup

- 2013/2014 Estonian Cup 2013, with TTÜ
- 2014/2015 Estonian Cup 2014, with TTÜ
