= Jiří Král =

Czech volleyball player (born 1981)

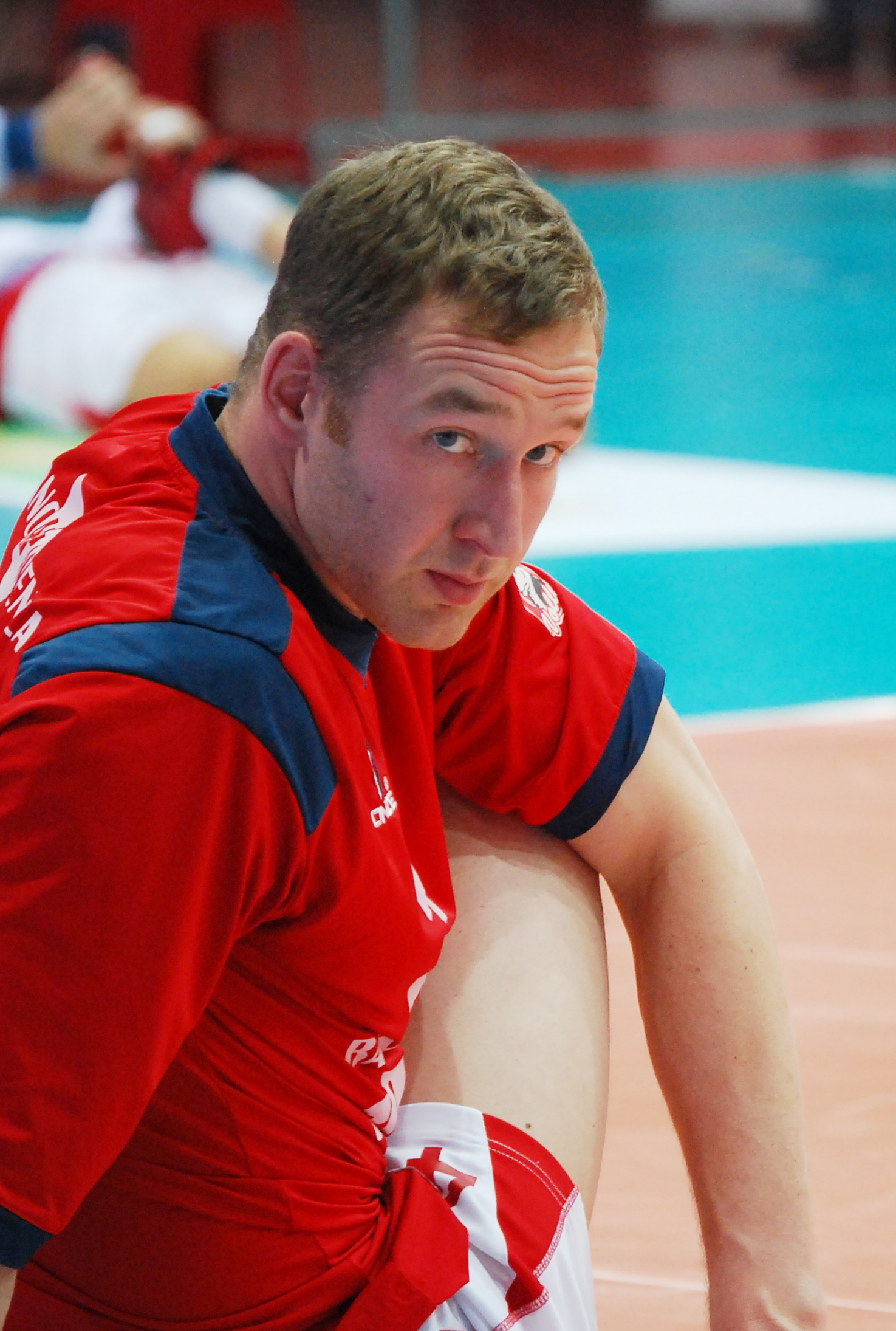

Personal information
- Nationality: Czech
- Born: 8 July 1981 (age 45); Mělník, Czechoslovakia
- Height: 202 cm (6 ft 8 in)
- Weight: 101 kg (223 lb)
- Spike: 356 cm (140 in)
- Block: 331 cm (130 in)

Volleyball information
- Number: 5 (national team)

Career
Years	Teams
2014-2015	Beauvais Oise Universite Club

National team
2014-2015	Czech Republic

Jiří Král (born 8 July 1981) is a Czech male volleyball player. He is part of the Czech Republic men's national volleyball team. On club level he plays for Beauvais Oise Universite Club.
