= 2010 FIVB Volleyball World League squads =

This article shows all participating team squads at the 2010 FIVB Volleyball World League, played by 16 countries.

== Argentina ==
The following is the roster in the 2010 FIVB Volleyball World League.

No.	Name	Date of birth	Height	Weight	Spike	Block	2010 club
1	Gabriel Arroyo	3 March 1977	194 cm (6 ft 4 in)	95 kg (209 lb)	352 cm (139 in)	327 cm (129 in)	Ciudad de Bolivar Club
2	Javier Filardi	7 February 1980	190 cm (6 ft 3 in)	89 kg (196 lb)	340 cm (130 in)	318 cm (125 in)	UPCN San Juan Volley
3	Martín Blanco Costa	16 December 1985	202 cm (6 ft 8 in)	98 kg (216 lb)	346 cm (136 in)	334 cm (131 in)	UPCN San Juan Voley
4	Lucas Ocampo	20 March 1986	196 cm (6 ft 5 in)	100 kg (220 lb)	335 cm (132 in)	318 cm (125 in)	Lomas Volley
5	Nicolás Uriarte	21 March 1990	192 cm (6 ft 4 in)	82 kg (181 lb)	346 cm (136 in)	326 cm (128 in)	PGE Skra Belchatow
6	Gustavo Scholtis	16 December 1982	206 cm (6 ft 9 in)	87 kg (192 lb)	358 cm (141 in)	338 cm (133 in)	La Unión de Formosa Club
7	Facundo Conte	25 August 1989	198 cm (6 ft 6 in)	90 kg (200 lb)	355 cm (140 in)	326 cm (128 in)	PGE Skra Belchatow
8	Demián González	21 February 1983	192 cm (6 ft 4 in)	81 kg (179 lb)	328 cm (129 in)	318 cm (125 in)	Brazil Kirin Club
9	Rodrigo Quiroga	23 March 1987	190 cm (6 ft 3 in)	86 kg (190 lb)	345 cm (136 in)	321 cm (126 in)	Vôlei Canoas
10	Alejandro Spajic	26 April 1976	204 cm (6 ft 8 in)	95 kg (209 lb)	360 cm (140 in)	340 cm (130 in)	UPCN San Juan Voley
12	Federico Pereyra	19 June 1988	200 cm (6 ft 7 in)	99 kg (218 lb)	335 cm (132 in)	325 cm (128 in)	Nolio Maaseik Club
13	Cristian Poglajen	14 July 1989	195 cm (6 ft 5 in)	93 kg (205 lb)	346 cm (136 in)	320 cm (130 in)	Montes Claros Vôlei
14	Guillermo García	21 September 1983	193 cm (6 ft 4 in)	92 kg (203 lb)	352 cm (139 in)	340 cm (130 in)	Ciudad de Bolívar
15	Luciano De Cecco	2 June 1988	194 cm (6 ft 4 in)	89 kg (196 lb)	333 cm (131 in)	315 cm (124 in)	Sir Safety Perugia
16	Alexis González	21 July 1981	184 cm (6 ft 0 in)	83 kg (183 lb)	321 cm (126 in)	300 cm (120 in)	Ciudad de Bolivar
17	Pablo Meana	10 June 1975	187 cm (6 ft 2 in)	87 kg (192 lb)	325 cm (128 in)	315 cm (124 in)	Drean Bolivar - ARG
18	Lucas Chávez	3 April 1982	199 cm (6 ft 6 in)	95 kg (209 lb)	335 cm (132 in)	318 cm (125 in)	Guaynabo Mets - PTR
19	Gastón Giani	26 April 1979	194 cm (6 ft 4 in)	86 kg (190 lb)	345 cm (136 in)	330 cm (130 in)	Tigre Volley Club - ARG

== Brazil ==
The following is the roster in the 2010 FIVB Volleyball World League.

No.	Name	Date of birth	Height	Weight	Spike	Block	2010 club
1	Bruno Rezende	2 July 1986	190 cm (6 ft 3 in)	76 kg (168 lb)	323 cm (127 in)	302 cm (119 in)	Pallavolo Modena
2	Sandro Carvalho	2 April 1981	189 cm (6 ft 2 in)	83 kg (183 lb)	317 cm (125 in)	306 cm (120 in)	SESI
3	Eder Carbonera	19 October 1983	204 cm (6 ft 8 in)	101 kg (223 lb)	350 cm (140 in)	330 cm (130 in)	Sada Cruzeiro Volei
4	Wallace de Souza	26 June 1987	198 cm (6 ft 6 in)	87 kg (192 lb)	344 cm (135 in)	318 cm (125 in)	Sada Cruzeiro Volei
5	Sidnei Santos	9 July 1982	203 cm (6 ft 8 in)	98 kg (216 lb)	344 cm (135 in)	318 cm (125 in)	Taubaté Funvic
6	Leandro Vissotto Neves	30 April 1983	212 cm (6 ft 11 in)	108 kg (238 lb)	370 cm (150 in)	345 cm (136 in)	JT Thunders
7	Gilberto Godoy Filho	23 December 1976	192 cm (6 ft 4 in)	85 kg (187 lb)	325 cm (128 in)	312 cm (123 in)	Cimed/Sky
8	Murilo Endres	3 May 1981	190 cm (6 ft 3 in)	76 kg (168 lb)	343 cm (135 in)	319 cm (126 in)	SESI
9	Theo Lopes	31 August 1983	199 cm (6 ft 6 in)	80 kg (180 lb)	345 cm (136 in)	324 cm (128 in)	UPCN San Juan Volley
10	Sérgio Dutra Santos	15 October 1975	184 cm (6 ft 0 in)	78 kg (172 lb)	325 cm (128 in)	310 cm (120 in)	SESI
11	Thiago Soares Alves	26 July 1986	194 cm (6 ft 4 in)	88 kg (194 lb)	330 cm (130 in)	308 cm (121 in)	RJX
12	Joao Paulo Tavares	30 March 1983	205 cm (6 ft 9 in)	95 kg (209 lb)	332 cm (131 in)	327 cm (129 in)	CIMED SKY
13	Tiago Barth	13 June 1988	209 cm (6 ft 10 in)	87 kg (192 lb)	360 cm (140 in)	330 cm (130 in)	SESI
14	Rodrigo Santana	17 April 1979	205 cm (6 ft 9 in)	85 kg (187 lb)	350 cm (140 in)	328 cm (129 in)	Al-Rayyan
15	Mauricio Borges Silva	4 February 1989	199 cm (6 ft 6 in)	99 kg (218 lb)	335 cm (132 in)	315 cm (124 in)	SESI
16	Lucas Saatkamp	6 March 1986	209 cm (6 ft 10 in)	101 kg (223 lb)	340 cm (130 in)	321 cm (126 in)	SESI
17	Marlon Yared	27 July 1977	188 cm (6 ft 2 in)	82 kg (181 lb)	310 cm (120 in)	289 cm (114 in)	RJX
18	Dante Amaral	30 September 1980	201 cm (6 ft 7 in)	86 kg (190 lb)	345 cm (136 in)	327 cm (129 in)	Panasonic Panthers
19	Mário Pedreira Júnior	3 May 1982	192 cm (6 ft 4 in)	91 kg (201 lb)	330 cm (130 in)	321 cm (126 in)	Volley Piacenza

== Bulgaria ==
The following is the roster in the 2010 FIVB Volleyball World League.

No.	Name	Date of birth	Height	Weight	Spike	Block	2010 club
1	Georgi Bratoev	21 October 1987	203 cm (6 ft 8 in)	96 kg (212 lb)	340 cm (130 in)	325 cm (128 in)	Lokomotiv Kharkiv
2	Hristo Tsvetanov	29 March 1978	198 cm (6 ft 6 in)	85 kg (187 lb)	345 cm (136 in)	330 cm (130 in)	ASUL Lyon
3	Andrey Zhekov	12 March 1980	190 cm (6 ft 3 in)	82 kg (181 lb)	340 cm (130 in)	326 cm (128 in)	Tomis
4	Vladislav Ivanov	14 March 1987	188 cm (6 ft 2 in)	80 kg (180 lb)	320 cm (130 in)	310 cm (120 in)	ASU Lyon
5	Svetoslav Gotsev	31 August 1990	205 cm (6 ft 9 in)	97 kg (214 lb)	358 cm (141 in)	335 cm (132 in)	Vero Volley Monza
6	Matey Kaziyski	23 September 1984	203 cm (6 ft 8 in)	93 kg (205 lb)	370 cm (150 in)	335 cm (132 in)	Al-Rayyan Sports Club
7	Miroslav Gradinarov	10 February 1985	203 cm (6 ft 8 in)	91 kg (201 lb)	350 cm (140 in)	330 cm (130 in)	TOAC TUC Toulouse
8	Boyan Yordanov	12 March 1983	197 cm (6 ft 6 in)	86 kg (190 lb)	358 cm (141 in)	335 cm (132 in)	Pallavolo Genova
9	Metodi Ananiev	17 February 1986	203 cm (6 ft 8 in)	100 kg (220 lb)	363 cm (143 in)	345 cm (136 in)	Indykpol AZS UWM
10	Valentin Bratoev	21 October 1987	203 cm (6 ft 8 in)	92 kg (203 lb)	347 cm (137 in)	337 cm (133 in)	GFC Ajaccio
11	Vladimir Nikolov	3 October 1977	200 cm (6 ft 7 in)	95 kg (209 lb)	345 cm (136 in)	325 cm (128 in)	ASU Lyon
12	Viktor Yosifov	16 October 1985	204 cm (6 ft 8 in)	100 kg (220 lb)	350 cm (140 in)	340 cm (130 in)	Guberniya
13	Teodor Salparov	16 August 1982	187 cm (6 ft 2 in)	77 kg (170 lb)	320 cm (130 in)	305 cm (120 in)	Zenit
14	Teodor Todorov	1 September 1989	208 cm (6 ft 10 in)	94 kg (207 lb)	365 cm (144 in)	345 cm (136 in)	Gazprom - Ugra Surgut
15	Todor Aleksiev	21 April 1983	204 cm (6 ft 8 in)	105 kg (231 lb)	355 cm (140 in)	340 cm (130 in)	Gazprom - Ugra Surgut
16	Ivan Stanev	7 July 1985	190 cm (6 ft 3 in)	86 kg (190 lb)	335 cm (132 in)	325 cm (128 in)	Neftohimik
17	Aleksandar Simeonov	6 January 1986	198 cm (6 ft 6 in)	89 kg (196 lb)	340 cm (130 in)	320 cm (130 in)	Levski Siconco
18	Nikolay Nikolov	29 July 1986	206 cm (6 ft 9 in)	97 kg (214 lb)	350 cm (140 in)	332 cm (131 in)	Shahrdari Urmia
19	Tsvetan Sokolov	31 December 1989	206 cm (6 ft 9 in)	100 kg (220 lb)	370 cm (150 in)	350 cm (140 in)	Halkbank

== China ==
The following is the roster in the 2010 FIVB Volleyball World League.

No.	Name	Date of birth	Height	Weight	Spike	Block	2010 club
1	Bian Hongmin	22 September 1989	210 cm (6 ft 11 in)	95 kg (209 lb)	355 cm (140 in)	330 cm (130 in)	Zhejiang
2	Dai Qingyao	26 September 1991	205 cm (6 ft 9 in)	100 kg (220 lb)	350 cm (140 in)	340 cm (130 in)	Shanghai
3	Yuan Zhi	29 September 1981	194 cm (6 ft 4 in)	95 kg (209 lb)	348 cm (137 in)	334 cm (131 in)	Liaoning
4	Zhang Chen	28 June 1985	200 cm (6 ft 7 in)	89 kg (196 lb)	356 cm (140 in)	340 cm (130 in)	Jiangsu
5	Guo Peng	1 July 1982	200 cm (6 ft 7 in)	84 kg (185 lb)	360 cm (140 in)	337 cm (133 in)	Army
6	Liang Chunlong	25 March 1988	206 cm (6 ft 9 in)	91 kg (201 lb)	351 cm (138 in)	333 cm (131 in)	Liaoning
7	Zhong Weijun	20 April 1989	200 cm (6 ft 7 in)	88 kg (194 lb)	347 cm (137 in)	335 cm (132 in)	Army
8	Cui Jianjun	1 August 1985	192 cm (6 ft 4 in)	94 kg (207 lb)	350 cm (140 in)	335 cm (132 in)	Henan
9	Jiao Shuai	28 January 1984	194 cm (6 ft 4 in)	75 kg (165 lb)	350 cm (140 in)	341 cm (134 in)	Henan
10	Chen Ping	1 September 1989	195 cm (6 ft 5 in)	78 kg (172 lb)	352 cm (139 in)	335 cm (132 in)	Jiangsu
11	Yu Dawei	21 June 1984	199 cm (6 ft 6 in)	90 kg (200 lb)	345 cm (136 in)	335 cm (132 in)	Shandong
12	Shen Qiong	5 September 1981	198 cm (6 ft 6 in)	84 kg (185 lb)	359 cm (141 in)	349 cm (137 in)	Shanghai
13	Jiang Kun	3 December 1985	197 cm (6 ft 6 in)	90 kg (200 lb)	340 cm (130 in)	330 cm (130 in)	Sichuan
14	Xu Jingtao	7 July 1988	202 cm (6 ft 8 in)	76 kg (168 lb)	356 cm (140 in)	320 cm (130 in)	Army
15	Li Runming	1 March 1990	198 cm (6 ft 6 in)	93 kg (205 lb)	350 cm (140 in)	326 cm (128 in)	Shandong
16	Ren Qi	24 February 1984	174 cm (5 ft 9 in)	70 kg (150 lb)	322 cm (127 in)	312 cm (123 in)	Shanghai
17	Ding Hui	24 June 1989	185 cm (6 ft 1 in)	80 kg (180 lb)	330 cm (130 in)	320 cm (130 in)	Zhejiang
18	Chen Jiahao	23 March 1982	187 cm (6 ft 2 in)	80 kg (180 lb)	340 cm (130 in)	335 cm (132 in)	Shanghai
19	Liu Tingwei	4 June 1987	195 cm (6 ft 5 in)	82 kg (181 lb)	353 cm (139 in)	332 cm (131 in)	Army

== Cuba ==
The following is the roster in the 2010 FIVB Volleyball World League.

No.	Name	Date of birth	Height	Weight	Spike	Block	2010 club
1	Wilfredo Leon Venero	31 July 1993	202 cm (6 ft 8 in)	96 kg (212 lb)	350 cm (140 in)	346 cm (136 in)	Santiago de Cuba
2	Lian Sem Estrada Jova	12 December 1982	196 cm (6 ft 5 in)	83 kg (183 lb)	339 cm (133 in)	335 cm (132 in)	Santiago de Cuba
3	Gustavo Leyva Alvarez	14 December 1985	180 cm (5 ft 11 in)	75 kg (165 lb)	305 cm (120 in)	300 cm (120 in)	Ciudad Habana
4	Yoandy Leal Hidalgo	31 August 1988	201 cm (6 ft 7 in)	84 kg (185 lb)	361 cm (142 in)	348 cm (137 in)	Sada Cruzeiro Volei
5	Leandro Macias Infante	13 February 1990	192 cm (6 ft 4 in)	70 kg (150 lb)	325 cm (128 in)	318 cm (125 in)	Santiago de Cuba
6	Keibel Gutierrez Torna	6 May 1987	178 cm (5 ft 10 in)	80 kg (180 lb)	305 cm (120 in)	295 cm (116 in)	Villa Clara
7	Osmany Roberto Camejo Durruthy	18 February 1983	202 cm (6 ft 8 in)	90 kg (200 lb)	350 cm (140 in)	330 cm (130 in)	Ciudad Habana
8	Rolando Cepeda Abreu	13 March 1989	198 cm (6 ft 6 in)	77 kg (170 lb)	359 cm (141 in)	344 cm (135 in)	S.Spiritus
9	Sandy Andrade Fernandez	12 October 1989	180 cm (5 ft 11 in)	71 kg (157 lb)	315 cm (124 in)	305 cm (120 in)	Cienfuegos
10	Yosvany Hernandez Carbonell	23 June 1991	200 cm (6 ft 7 in)	90 kg (200 lb)	344 cm (135 in)	336 cm (132 in)	Cienfuegos
11	Gonzalez Raidel Delgado	8 September 1987	195 cm (6 ft 5 in)	81 kg (179 lb)	347 cm (137 in)	330 cm (130 in)	La Habana
12	Yenry Bell Cisnero	27 July 1981	188 cm (6 ft 2 in)	84 kg (185 lb)	358 cm (141 in)	328 cm (129 in)	Santiago de Cuba
13	Robertlandy Simón Aties	11 June 1987	206 cm (6 ft 9 in)	91 kg (201 lb)	358 cm (141 in)	326 cm (128 in)	Al-Rayyan Sports Club
14	Raydel Hierrezuelo Aguirre	14 July 1987	196 cm (6 ft 5 in)	87 kg (192 lb)	340 cm (130 in)	335 cm (132 in)	Ciudad Habana
15	Darien Ferrer Delis	31 October 1983	204 cm (6 ft 8 in)	84 kg (185 lb)	362 cm (143 in)	346 cm (136 in)	Santiago de Cuba
16	Isbel Mesa Sandobal	2 June 1989	204 cm (6 ft 8 in)	89 kg (196 lb)	358 cm (141 in)	331 cm (130 in)	C. Habana
17	Jorge Gonzalez Garcia	31 March 1991	204 cm (6 ft 8 in)	85 kg (187 lb)	350 cm (140 in)	340 cm (130 in)	Pinar del Rio
18	Yosmany Díaz Carmenate	8 January 1988	196 cm (6 ft 5 in)	89 kg (196 lb)	358 cm (141 in)	328 cm (129 in)	Ciudad Habana
19	Fernando Hernandez Ramos	11 September 1989	196 cm (6 ft 5 in)	78 kg (172 lb)	358 cm (141 in)	339 cm (133 in)	C.Habana

== Egypt ==
The following is the roster in the 2010 FIVB Volleyball World League.

No.	Name	Date of birth	Height	Weight	Spike	Block	2010 club
1	Mahmoud Abd El Kader	12 May 1985	195 cm (6 ft 5 in)	94 kg (207 lb)	342 cm (135 in)	316 cm (124 in)	AHLY
2	Abdallah Bekhit	10 October 1983	198 cm (6 ft 6 in)	72 kg (159 lb)	352 cm (139 in)	331 cm (130 in)	AHLY
3	Mohamed Gabal	21 January 1984	195 cm (6 ft 5 in)	97 kg (214 lb)	345 cm (136 in)	320 cm (130 in)	El Gaish
4	Ahmed Abdelhay	19 August 1984	197 cm (6 ft 6 in)	87 kg (192 lb)	342 cm (135 in)	316 cm (124 in)	ARMY CLUB
5	Abdellatif Ahmed	13 August 1983	202 cm (6 ft 8 in)	90 kg (200 lb)	345 cm (136 in)	325 cm (128 in)	ZAMALEK
6	Wael Alaydy	8 December 1971	178 cm (5 ft 10 in)	78 kg (172 lb)	320 cm (130 in)	300 cm (120 in)	ZAMALEK
7	Ashraf Abouelhassan	17 May 1975	186 cm (6 ft 1 in)	86 kg (190 lb)	325 cm (128 in)	318 cm (125 in)	ZAMALEK
8	Saleh Youssef	25 July 1982	194 cm (6 ft 4 in)	91 kg (201 lb)	345 cm (136 in)	332 cm (131 in)	Zamalek
9	Rashad Atia	2 September 1986	201 cm (6 ft 7 in)	91 kg (201 lb)	348 cm (137 in)	342 cm (135 in)	ZAMALEK
10	Mahmoud El Koumy	19 October 1983	194 cm (6 ft 4 in)	80 kg (180 lb)	325 cm (128 in)	315 cm (124 in)	Al Ahly
11	Ahmed Afifi	30 March 1988	194 cm (6 ft 4 in)	92 kg (203 lb)	347 cm (137 in)	342 cm (135 in)	ZAMALEK
12	Hosaam Abdalla	16 February 1988	202 cm (6 ft 8 in)	90 kg (200 lb)	326 cm (128 in)	0 cm (0 in)	Ahly
13	Mohamed Badawy	1 November 1986	197 cm (6 ft 6 in)	95 kg (209 lb)	351 cm (138 in)	335 cm (132 in)	ZAMALEK
14	Ahmed El Kotb	23 July 1991	202 cm (6 ft 8 in)	86 kg (190 lb)	343 cm (135 in)	335 cm (132 in)	AHLY
15	Ahmed Abdel Fattah	14 June 1986	198 cm (6 ft 6 in)	95 kg (209 lb)	335 cm (132 in)	325 cm (128 in)	POLICE UNION
16	Mohamed Seif Elnasr	5 September 1983	202 cm (6 ft 8 in)	89 kg (196 lb)	345 cm (136 in)	339 cm (133 in)	ZAMALEK
17	Mohamed Thakil	12 July 1986	184 cm (6 ft 0 in)	71 kg (157 lb)	326 cm (128 in)	315 cm (124 in)	ARMY CLUB
18	Mohamed El Daabousi	1 March 1987	202 cm (6 ft 8 in)	90 kg (200 lb)	334 cm (131 in)	329 cm (130 in)	Petrojet
19	Mohamed Moawad	26 August 1987	194 cm (6 ft 4 in)	90 kg (200 lb)	321 cm (126 in)	310 cm (120 in)	AHLY

== Finland ==
The following is the roster in the 2010 FIVB Volleyball World League.

No.	Name	Date of birth	Height	Weight	Spike	Block	2010 club
1	Jesse Mäntylä	24 March 1987	176 cm (5 ft 9 in)	70 kg (150 lb)	321 cm (126 in)	289 cm (114 in)	Hurrikaani-Loimaa (FIN)
2	Eemi Tervaportti	26 July 1989	193 cm (6 ft 4 in)	73 kg (161 lb)	338 cm (133 in)	317 cm (125 in)	Roeselare (BEL)
3	Mikko Esko	3 September 1978	198 cm (6 ft 6 in)	89 kg (196 lb)	331 cm (130 in)	319 cm (126 in)	Nizhni Novgorod (RUS)
4	Olli-Pekka Ojansivu	31 December 1987	197 cm (6 ft 6 in)	90 kg (200 lb)	344 cm (135 in)	325 cm (128 in)	Kokkolan Tiikerit (FIN)
5	Antti Siltala	14 March 1984	193 cm (6 ft 4 in)	90 kg (200 lb)	348 cm (137 in)	330 cm (130 in)	Jenisei Krasnojarsk (RUS)
6	Niklas Seppänen	30 June 1993	192 cm (6 ft 4 in)	82 kg (181 lb)	335 cm (132 in)	320 cm (130 in)	Tourcoing Lille, FRA
7	Matti Hietanen	3 January 1983	199 cm (6 ft 6 in)	93 kg (205 lb)	350 cm (140 in)	320 cm (130 in)	Gdansk (POL)
8	Jari Tuominen	11 September 1986	200 cm (6 ft 7 in)	89 kg (196 lb)	345 cm (136 in)	320 cm (130 in)	Cantún (ITA)
9	Simo-Pekka Olli	13 November 1985	204 cm (6 ft 8 in)	100 kg (220 lb)	343 cm (135 in)	330 cm (130 in)	Raision Loimu (FIN)
10	Jani Sippola	4 May 1990	191 cm (6 ft 3 in)	91 kg (201 lb)	335 cm (132 in)	315 cm (124 in)	Raision Loimu (FIN)
11	Henri Tuomi	14 December 1982	196 cm (6 ft 5 in)	93 kg (205 lb)	345 cm (136 in)	320 cm (130 in)	Raision Loimu (FIN)
12	Olli Kunnari	2 February 1982	197 cm (6 ft 6 in)	85 kg (187 lb)	342 cm (135 in)	315 cm (124 in)	Vammalan Lentopallo (FIN)
13	Mikko Oivanen	26 May 1986	198 cm (6 ft 6 in)	92 kg (203 lb)	360 cm (140 in)	320 cm (130 in)	Czarni Radom (POL)
14	Konstantin Shumov	15 February 1985	205 cm (6 ft 9 in)	98 kg (216 lb)	351 cm (138 in)	331 cm (130 in)	Treia (ITA)
15	Matti Oivanen	26 May 1986	198 cm (6 ft 6 in)	90 kg (200 lb)	355 cm (140 in)	320 cm (130 in)	Hurrikaani-Loimaa (FIN)
16	Urpo Sivula	15 March 1988	195 cm (6 ft 5 in)	100 kg (220 lb)	350 cm (140 in)	330 cm (130 in)	Raision Loimu (FIN)
17	Anssi Vesanen	21 February 1980	201 cm (6 ft 7 in)	105 kg (231 lb)	360 cm (140 in)	326 cm (128 in)	Tampereen Isku-Volley (FIN)
18	Jukka Lehtonen	22 February 1982	197 cm (6 ft 6 in)	90 kg (200 lb)	346 cm (136 in)	325 cm (128 in)	LEKA Volley (FIN)
19	Pasi Hyvärinen	22 November 1987	184 cm (6 ft 0 in)	80 kg (180 lb)	320 cm (130 in)	300 cm (120 in)	KyKy-Betset (FIN)

== France ==
The following is the roster in the 2010 FIVB Volleyball World League.

No.	Name	Date of birth	Height	Weight	Spike	Block	2010 club
1	Yannick Bazin	18 June 1983	190 cm (6 ft 3 in)	95 kg (209 lb)	337 cm (133 in)	315 cm (124 in)	Galatazarai
2	Hubert Henno	6 October 1976	188 cm (6 ft 2 in)	83 kg (183 lb)	330 cm (130 in)	310 cm (120 in)	Macerata
3	Gérald Hardy-Dessources	9 February 1983	197 cm (6 ft 6 in)	93 kg (205 lb)	360 cm (140 in)	335 cm (132 in)	Tours VB
4	Antonin Rouzier	18 August 1986	201 cm (6 ft 7 in)	100 kg (220 lb)	350 cm (140 in)	330 cm (130 in)	Ankara
5	Romain Vadeleux	12 February 1983	196 cm (6 ft 5 in)	100 kg (220 lb)	355 cm (140 in)	335 cm (132 in)	Lube Macerata
6	Jean-Stéphane Tolar	4 July 1984	199 cm (6 ft 6 in)	90 kg (200 lb)	330 cm (130 in)	309 cm (122 in)	Tourcoing VLM
7	Benjamin Toniutti	30 October 1989	183 cm (6 ft 0 in)	72 kg (159 lb)	320 cm (130 in)	300 cm (120 in)	Friedrichshafen
8	Earvin N'Gapeth	12 February 1991	194 cm (6 ft 4 in)	93 kg (205 lb)	358 cm (141 in)	327 cm (129 in)	Modène
9	Guillaume Samica	28 September 1981	198 cm (6 ft 6 in)	88 kg (194 lb)	355 cm (140 in)	327 cm (129 in)	Zaksa
10	Jean-Philippe Sol	1 January 1986	198 cm (6 ft 6 in)	92 kg (203 lb)	345 cm (136 in)	325 cm (128 in)	Arago de Sète
11	Edouard Rowlandson	20 July 1988	190 cm (6 ft 3 in)	89 kg (196 lb)	330 cm (130 in)	310 cm (120 in)	Arago de Sète
12	Nicolas Marechal	4 March 1987	198 cm (6 ft 6 in)	93 kg (205 lb)	338 cm (133 in)	327 cm (129 in)	Skra Belchatov
13	Pierre Pujol	13 July 1984	186 cm (6 ft 1 in)	90 kg (200 lb)	335 cm (132 in)	315 cm (124 in)	AS Cannes
14	Toafa Takaniko	29 May 1985	194 cm (6 ft 4 in)	92 kg (203 lb)	340 cm (130 in)	330 cm (130 in)	Arago de Sète
15	Samuele Tuia	24 July 1986	195 cm (6 ft 5 in)	95 kg (209 lb)	345 cm (136 in)	325 cm (128 in)	Skra Belchatov
16	Emmanuel Ragondet	6 August 1987	191 cm (6 ft 3 in)	77 kg (170 lb)	338 cm (133 in)	320 cm (130 in)	Arago de Sète
17	Oliver Kieffer	27 August 1979	200 cm (6 ft 7 in)	85 kg (187 lb)	355 cm (140 in)	335 cm (132 in)	Stade Poitevin
18	Jean-François Exiga	9 March 1982	176 cm (5 ft 9 in)	75 kg (165 lb)	320 cm (130 in)	312 cm (123 in)	Tours VB
19	Baptiste Geiler	12 March 1987	198 cm (6 ft 6 in)	93 kg (205 lb)	335 cm (132 in)	318 cm (125 in)	VfB Friedrichshafen

== Germany ==
The following is the roster in the 2010 FIVB Volleyball World League.

No.	Name	Date of birth	Height	Weight	Spike	Block	2010 club
1	Sebastian Prüsener	26 May 1982	196 cm (6 ft 5 in)	86 kg (190 lb)	330 cm (130 in)	319 cm (126 in)	Generali Haching
2	Dirk Westphal	31 January 1986	203 cm (6 ft 8 in)	92 kg (203 lb)	354 cm (139 in)	331 cm (130 in)	Czarni Radom
3	Sebastian Schwarz	2 October 1985	197 cm (6 ft 6 in)	94 kg (207 lb)	340 cm (130 in)	325 cm (128 in)	NN
4	Simon Tischer	24 April 1982	194 cm (6 ft 4 in)	88 kg (194 lb)	346 cm (136 in)	328 cm (129 in)	VfB Friedrichshafen
5	Björn Andrae	14 May 1981	200 cm (6 ft 7 in)	92 kg (203 lb)	350 cm (140 in)	330 cm (130 in)	Kuzbass Kemerovo
6	Denys Kaliberda	24 June 1990	193 cm (6 ft 4 in)	95 kg (209 lb)	343 cm (135 in)	314 cm (124 in)	Jastrzebski Wegiel
7	Lukas Bauer	26 February 1989	202 cm (6 ft 8 in)	94 kg (207 lb)	342 cm (135 in)	328 cm (129 in)	Arago de Sète
8	Marcus Böhme	25 August 1985	211 cm (6 ft 11 in)	116 kg (256 lb)	360 cm (140 in)	330 cm (130 in)	Fenerbahce Istanbul
9	Felix Fischer	27 February 1983	203 cm (6 ft 8 in)	88 kg (194 lb)	343 cm (135 in)	316 cm (124 in)	Berlin Recycling Volleys
10	Jochen Schöps	8 October 1983	200 cm (6 ft 7 in)	100 kg (220 lb)	360 cm (140 in)	335 cm (132 in)	Asseco Resovia Rzeszów
11	Manuel Rieke	23 October 1982	193 cm (6 ft 4 in)	90 kg (200 lb)	324 cm (128 in)	302 cm (119 in)	Netzhoppers KW-Bestensee
12	Ferdinand Tille	8 December 1988	185 cm (6 ft 1 in)	75 kg (165 lb)	338 cm (133 in)	316 cm (124 in)	Skra Belchatów
13	Christian Dünnes	16 June 1984	207 cm (6 ft 9 in)	105 kg (231 lb)	350 cm (140 in)	331 cm (130 in)	Generali Haching
14	Robert Kromm	9 March 1984	212 cm (6 ft 11 in)	102 kg (225 lb)	360 cm (140 in)	345 cm (136 in)	Berlin Recycling Volleys
15	Max Günthör	9 August 1985	207 cm (6 ft 9 in)	93 kg (205 lb)	350 cm (140 in)	325 cm (128 in)	VfB Friedrichshafen
16	Eugen Bakumovski	11 October 1980	193 cm (6 ft 4 in)	90 kg (200 lb)	360 cm (140 in)	330 cm (130 in)	Generali Haching
17	Patrick Steuerwald	3 March 1986	180 cm (5 ft 11 in)	80 kg (180 lb)	335 cm (132 in)	315 cm (124 in)	Generali Haching
18	György Grozer	27 November 1984	200 cm (6 ft 7 in)	102 kg (225 lb)	374 cm (147 in)	345 cm (136 in)	Belogorie Belgorod
19	Sebastian Krause	16 October 1989	203 cm (6 ft 8 in)	100 kg (220 lb)	342 cm (135 in)	325 cm (128 in)	VfB Friedrichshafen

== Italy ==
The following is the roster in the 2010 FIVB Volleyball World League.

No.	Name	Date of birth	Height	Weight	Spike	Block	2010 club
1	Luigi Mastrangelo	17 August 1975	202 cm (6 ft 8 in)	90 kg (200 lb)	368 cm (145 in)	336 cm (132 in)	Bre banca Lannuti Cuneo
2	Davide Marra	12 March 1984	180 cm (5 ft 11 in)	70 kg (150 lb)	322 cm (127 in)	300 cm (120 in)	Copra Morpho
3	Simone Parodi	16 June 1986	196 cm (6 ft 5 in)	82 kg (181 lb)	350 cm (140 in)	335 cm (132 in)	Volley Lube
4	Loris Manià	27 January 1979	190 cm (6 ft 3 in)	76 kg (168 lb)	330 cm (130 in)	315 cm (124 in)	Trenkwalder
5	Valerio Vermiglio	1 March 1976	193 cm (6 ft 4 in)	85 kg (187 lb)	342 cm (135 in)	320 cm (130 in)	ZENIT Kazan
6	Rocco Barone	14 December 1987	200 cm (6 ft 7 in)	91 kg (201 lb)	335 cm (132 in)	321 cm (126 in)	Tonno Callipo
7	Michal Lasko	11 March 1981	202 cm (6 ft 8 in)	104 kg (229 lb)	348 cm (137 in)	337 cm (133 in)	Jastrzebski Wegel
8	Gabriele Maruotti	25 March 1988	195 cm (6 ft 5 in)	92 kg (203 lb)	348 cm (137 in)	340 cm (130 in)	Piemonte volley
9	Matteo Martino	28 January 1987	197 cm (6 ft 6 in)	84 kg (185 lb)	340 cm (130 in)	322 cm (127 in)	Lube Banca Marche
10	Mauro Gavotto	16 April 1979	201 cm (6 ft 7 in)	88 kg (194 lb)	350 cm (140 in)	330 cm (130 in)	Acqua Paradiso
11	Cristian Savani	22 February 1982	195 cm (6 ft 5 in)	95 kg (209 lb)	354 cm (139 in)	335 cm (132 in)	Lube Banca Marche
12	Simone Buti	19 September 1983	206 cm (6 ft 9 in)	100 kg (220 lb)	346 cm (136 in)	328 cm (129 in)	Sir Safety Umbria Volley
13	Dragan Travica	28 August 1986	200 cm (6 ft 7 in)	94 kg (207 lb)	335 cm (132 in)	320 cm (130 in)	Belogorie Belgorod
14	Alessandro Fei	29 November 1978	204 cm (6 ft 8 in)	90 kg (200 lb)	358 cm (141 in)	336 cm (132 in)	Copra Elior Piacenza
15	Emanuele Birarelli	8 February 1981	202 cm (6 ft 8 in)	95 kg (209 lb)	340 cm (130 in)	316 cm (124 in)	Sir Safety Umbria Volley
16	Michele Baranowicz	5 August 1989	196 cm (6 ft 5 in)	93 kg (205 lb)	350 cm (140 in)	328 cm (129 in)	Volley Lube
17	Andrea Sala	27 December 1978	202 cm (6 ft 8 in)	96 kg (212 lb)	359 cm (141 in)	340 cm (130 in)	Trentino Betclic
18	Matej Cernic	13 September 1978	192 cm (6 ft 4 in)	80 kg (180 lb)	354 cm (139 in)	335 cm (132 in)	Assecco Resovia
19	Ivan Zaytsev	2 October 1988	202 cm (6 ft 8 in)	92 kg (203 lb)	355 cm (140 in)	348 cm (137 in)	Dinamo Moscow

== South Korea ==
The following is the roster in the 2010 FIVB Volleyball World League.

No.	Name	Date of birth	Height	Weight	Spike	Block	2010 club
1	Shin Young-soo	1 July 1982	197 cm (6 ft 6 in)	90 kg (200 lb)	335 cm (132 in)	313 cm (123 in)	Korean Airlines co.
2	Han Sun-soo	16 December 1985	189 cm (6 ft 2 in)	80 kg (180 lb)	310 cm (120 in)	297 cm (117 in)	Korean Army
3	Kwon Young-min	5 July 1980	190 cm (6 ft 3 in)	82 kg (181 lb)	315 cm (124 in)	309 cm (122 in)	Hyundai Capital Co.
4	Moon Sung-min	14 September 1986	198 cm (6 ft 6 in)	89 kg (196 lb)	329 cm (130 in)	321 cm (126 in)	Hyundai Capital Co.
5	Yeo Oh-hyun	2 September 1978	175 cm (5 ft 9 in)	70 kg (150 lb)	280 cm (110 in)	279 cm (110 in)	Hyundai Capital
6	Choi Tae-woong	9 April 1976	185 cm (6 ft 1 in)	80 kg (180 lb)	315 cm (124 in)	302 cm (119 in)	Hyundai Capital
7	Lee Sun-kyu	14 March 1981	199 cm (6 ft 6 in)	90 kg (200 lb)	325 cm (128 in)	320 cm (130 in)	Samsung Fire & Marine Insuranc
8	Kim Hak-min	4 September 1983	193 cm (6 ft 4 in)	81 kg (179 lb)	327 cm (129 in)	319 cm (126 in)	Korean Airlines Co.
9	Kang Dong-jin	31 August 1983	192 cm (6 ft 4 in)	86 kg (190 lb)	322 cm (127 in)	311 cm (122 in)	Korean Airlines co.
10	Ko Hee-jin	13 July 1980	198 cm (6 ft 6 in)	91 kg (201 lb)	330 cm (130 in)	320 cm (130 in)	Samsung Fire&Marine Insurance
11	Lee Kyung-soo	27 April 1979	198 cm (6 ft 6 in)	90 kg (200 lb)	332 cm (131 in)	315 cm (124 in)	LIG Insurance
12	Kim Hyun-soo	6 June 1986	196 cm (6 ft 5 in)	81 kg (179 lb)	325 cm (128 in)	315 cm (124 in)	Woori Capital
13	Park Chul-woo	25 July 1985	198 cm (6 ft 6 in)	88 kg (194 lb)	332 cm (131 in)	319 cm (126 in)	Samsung Fire&Marine Insurance
14	Kim Yo-han	16 August 1985	200 cm (6 ft 7 in)	95 kg (209 lb)	335 cm (132 in)	326 cm (128 in)	LIG Insurance
15	Ha Hyun-yong	9 May 1982	198 cm (6 ft 6 in)	88 kg (194 lb)	330 cm (130 in)	322 cm (127 in)	LIG Insurance
16	Park Jun-bum	12 June 1988	198 cm (6 ft 6 in)	90 kg (200 lb)	332 cm (131 in)	318 cm (125 in)	KEPCO 45
17	Ha Kyoung-min	27 July 1982	201 cm (6 ft 7 in)	83 kg (183 lb)	320 cm (130 in)	310 cm (120 in)	Kepco 45
18	Shin Yung-suk	4 October 1986	198 cm (6 ft 6 in)	90 kg (200 lb)	335 cm (132 in)	325 cm (128 in)	Korean Army
19	Lee Kang-joo	30 June 1983	185 cm (6 ft 1 in)	75 kg (165 lb)	305 cm (120 in)	290 cm (110 in)	Samsung Fire&Marine Insurance

== Netherlands ==
The following is the roster in the 2010 FIVB Volleyball World League.

No.	Name	Date of birth	Height	Weight	Spike	Block	2010 club
1	Dirk Sparidans	5 March 1989	181 cm (5 ft 11 in)	86 kg (190 lb)	326 cm (128 in)	300 cm (120 in)	Euphony Asse Lennik
2	Nico Freriks	22 December 1981	193 cm (6 ft 4 in)	87 kg (192 lb)	332 cm (131 in)	314 cm (124 in)	Paykan Tehran
3	Yannick Van Harskamp	2 April 1986	190 cm (6 ft 3 in)	88 kg (194 lb)	335 cm (132 in)	316 cm (124 in)	Topvolley Precura Antwerpen
4	Robert Horstink	26 December 1981	202 cm (6 ft 8 in)	96 kg (212 lb)	365 cm (144 in)	350 cm (140 in)	Sisley Treviso
5	Joris Marcelis	10 December 1984	211 cm (6 ft 11 in)	100 kg (220 lb)	360 cm (140 in)	345 cm (136 in)	Langhenkel Volley
6	Roland Rademaker	18 March 1982	192 cm (6 ft 4 in)	83 kg (183 lb)	325 cm (128 in)	317 cm (125 in)	Tourcoing
7	Gijs Jorna	30 May 1989	196 cm (6 ft 5 in)	85 kg (187 lb)	340 cm (130 in)	310 cm (120 in)	Noliko Maaseik
8	Kay Van Dijk	25 June 1984	214 cm (7 ft 0 in)	102 kg (225 lb)	365 cm (144 in)	355 cm (140 in)	Al-Ain
9	Jeroen Trommel	1 August 1980	194 cm (6 ft 4 in)	90 kg (200 lb)	340 cm (130 in)	310 cm (120 in)	IBB Spor
10	Jeroen Rauwerdink	13 September 1985	200 cm (6 ft 7 in)	96 kg (212 lb)	350 cm (140 in)	320 cm (130 in)	Acqua Paradiso Monza
11	Robbert Andringa	28 April 1990	192 cm (6 ft 4 in)	85 kg (187 lb)	330 cm (130 in)	310 cm (120 in)	Euphony Asse Lennik
12	Wytze Kooistra	3 June 1982	209 cm (6 ft 10 in)	102 kg (225 lb)	360 cm (140 in)	350 cm (140 in)	Olympiakos
13	Tije Vlam	9 October 1985	207 cm (6 ft 9 in)	102 kg (225 lb)	347 cm (137 in)	330 cm (130 in)	Al-Arabi
14	Niels Klapwijk	19 September 1985	200 cm (6 ft 7 in)	89 kg (196 lb)	350 cm (140 in)	320 cm (130 in)	Besiktas
15	Lars Lorsheijd	8 June 1985	200 cm (6 ft 7 in)	97 kg (214 lb)	357 cm (141 in)	350 cm (140 in)	Tourcoing
16	Dick Kooy	3 December 1987	202 cm (6 ft 8 in)	80 kg (180 lb)	360 cm (140 in)	340 cm (130 in)	Halkbank Ankara
17	Johannes Cornelius Bontje	12 May 1981	206 cm (6 ft 9 in)	98 kg (216 lb)	366 cm (144 in)	340 cm (130 in)	Noliko Maaseik
18	Jelte Maan	19 March 1986	190 cm (6 ft 3 in)	86 kg (190 lb)	343 cm (135 in)	330 cm (130 in)	Noliko Maaseik
19	Mathijs Mast	14 September 1984	200 cm (6 ft 7 in)	90 kg (200 lb)	340 cm (130 in)	330 cm (130 in)	SV Dynamo Volleybal

== Poland ==
The following is the roster in the 2010 FIVB Volleyball World League.

No.	Name	Date of birth	Height	Weight	Spike	Block	2010 club
1	Piotr Nowakowski	18 December 1987	205 cm (6 ft 9 in)	90 kg (200 lb)	355 cm (140 in)	340 cm (130 in)	Asseco Resovia
2	Michal Winiarski	28 September 1983	200 cm (6 ft 7 in)	82 kg (181 lb)	345 cm (136 in)	332 cm (131 in)	Fakiel Novy Urengoy
3	Piotr Gruszka	8 March 1977	206 cm (6 ft 9 in)	102 kg (225 lb)	355 cm (140 in)	330 cm (130 in)	GS RoburAngelo Costa
4	Daniel Plinski	10 December 1978	204 cm (6 ft 8 in)	100 kg (220 lb)	345 cm (136 in)	325 cm (128 in)	PGE Skra
5	Pawel Zagumny	18 October 1977	200 cm (6 ft 7 in)	88 kg (194 lb)	336 cm (132 in)	317 cm (125 in)	ZAKSA
6	Bartosz Kurek	29 August 1988	205 cm (6 ft 9 in)	87 kg (192 lb)	352 cm (139 in)	326 cm (128 in)	Lube Banca Marche
7	Jakub Jarosz	10 February 1987	195 cm (6 ft 5 in)	84 kg (185 lb)	353 cm (139 in)	328 cm (129 in)	Transfer
8	Karol Klos	8 August 1989	201 cm (6 ft 7 in)	87 kg (192 lb)	357 cm (141 in)	326 cm (128 in)	PGE Skra
9	Zbigniew Bartman	4 May 1987	198 cm (6 ft 6 in)	95 kg (209 lb)	352 cm (139 in)	320 cm (130 in)	Asseco Resovia
10	Mariusz Wlazly	4 August 1983	194 cm (6 ft 4 in)	80 kg (180 lb)	360 cm (140 in)	329 cm (130 in)	PGE Skra
11	Lukasz Zygadlo	2 August 1979	200 cm (6 ft 7 in)	89 kg (196 lb)	337 cm (133 in)	325 cm (128 in)	Zienit Kazan
12	Pawel Zatorski	21 June 1990	184 cm (6 ft 0 in)	73 kg (161 lb)	328 cm (129 in)	304 cm (120 in)	ZAKSA
13	Mateusz Mika	21 January 1991	206 cm (6 ft 9 in)	86 kg (190 lb)	352 cm (139 in)	320 cm (130 in)	LOTOS Trefl
14	Michal Ruciak	22 August 1983	189 cm (6 ft 2 in)	75 kg (165 lb)	336 cm (132 in)	305 cm (120 in)	ZAKSA
15	Piotr Gacek	16 September 1978	185 cm (6 ft 1 in)	78 kg (172 lb)	325 cm (128 in)	305 cm (120 in)	LOTOS Trefl
16	Patryk Czarnowski	1 November 1985	201 cm (6 ft 7 in)	85 kg (187 lb)	355 cm (140 in)	335 cm (132 in)	ZAKSA
17	Michal Bakiewicz	22 March 1981	197 cm (6 ft 6 in)	92 kg (203 lb)	339 cm (133 in)	318 cm (125 in)	PGE Skra
18	Marcin Mozdzonek	9 February 1985	211 cm (6 ft 11 in)	93 kg (205 lb)	358 cm (141 in)	338 cm (133 in)	Halkbank
19	Grzegorz Lomacz	1 October 1987	187 cm (6 ft 2 in)	80 kg (180 lb)	335 cm (132 in)	315 cm (124 in)	Cuprum

== Russia ==
The following is the roster in the 2010 FIVB Volleyball World League.

No.	Name	Date of birth	Height	Weight	Spike	Block	2010 club
1	Dmitriy Ilinykh	31 January 1987	201 cm (6 ft 7 in)	92 kg (203 lb)	338 cm (133 in)	330 cm (130 in)	Belogorie
2	Semen Poltavskiy	8 February 1981	205 cm (6 ft 9 in)	89 kg (196 lb)	360 cm (140 in)	338 cm (133 in)	Yaroslavich
3	Dmitry Krasikov	8 February 1987	202 cm (6 ft 8 in)	93 kg (205 lb)	349 cm (137 in)	330 cm (130 in)	Fakel
4	Taras Khtey	22 May 1982	205 cm (6 ft 9 in)	109 kg (240 lb)	351 cm (138 in)	339 cm (133 in)	Belogorie
5	Pavel Abramov	23 April 1979	200 cm (6 ft 7 in)	87 kg (192 lb)	347 cm (137 in)	336 cm (132 in)	Iskra
6	Sergey Grankin	21 January 1985	195 cm (6 ft 5 in)	96 kg (212 lb)	351 cm (138 in)	320 cm (130 in)	Dinamo
7	Alexey Kazakov	18 March 1976	217 cm (7 ft 1 in)	112 kg (247 lb)	358 cm (141 in)	344 cm (135 in)	Belogorie
8	Denis Biriukov	8 December 1988	202 cm (6 ft 8 in)	93 kg (205 lb)	352 cm (139 in)	324 cm (128 in)	Dinamo
9	Alexey Cheremisin	23 September 1980	202 cm (6 ft 8 in)	98 kg (216 lb)	350 cm (140 in)	338 cm (133 in)	ZENIT Kazan
10	Yury Berezhko	27 January 1984	196 cm (6 ft 5 in)	93 kg (205 lb)	346 cm (136 in)	338 cm (133 in)	Dinamo
11	Alexander Yanutov	19 June 1983	195 cm (6 ft 5 in)	103 kg (227 lb)	335 cm (132 in)	315 cm (124 in)	Gazprom-Yugra
12	Alexander Butko	18 March 1986	198 cm (6 ft 6 in)	97 kg (214 lb)	339 cm (133 in)	327 cm (129 in)	Lokomotiv
13	Dmitriy Muserskiy	29 October 1988	218 cm (7 ft 2 in)	104 kg (229 lb)	375 cm (148 in)	347 cm (137 in)	Belogorie
14	Anton Astashenkov	27 October 1981	204 cm (6 ft 8 in)	105 kg (231 lb)	361 cm (142 in)	328 cm (129 in)	LOKOMOTIV NOVOSIBIRSK
15	Alexander Volkov	14 February 1985	210 cm (6 ft 11 in)	90 kg (200 lb)	360 cm (140 in)	335 cm (132 in)	ZENIT Kazan
16	Sergey Makarov	28 March 1980	196 cm (6 ft 5 in)	97 kg (214 lb)	337 cm (133 in)	329 cm (130 in)	Kuzbass
17	Maxim Mikhaylov	19 March 1988	202 cm (6 ft 8 in)	103 kg (227 lb)	345 cm (136 in)	330 cm (130 in)	Zenit Kazan
18	Dmitry Shcherbinin	10 September 1989	205 cm (6 ft 9 in)	95 kg (209 lb)	350 cm (140 in)	335 cm (132 in)	Dinamo
19	Valery Komarov	21 March 1980	187 cm (6 ft 2 in)	85 kg (187 lb)	311 cm (122 in)	306 cm (120 in)	Ural

== Serbia ==
The following is the roster in the 2010 FIVB Volleyball World League.

No.	Name	Date of birth	Height	Weight	Spike	Block	2010 club
1	Nikola Kovacevic	14 February 1983	193 cm (6 ft 4 in)	78 kg (172 lb)	350 cm (140 in)	340 cm (130 in)	Calzedonia Verona (ITA)
2	Uros Kovacevic	6 May 1993	197 cm (6 ft 6 in)	90 kg (200 lb)	340 cm (130 in)	310 cm (120 in)	Casa Modena (ITA)
3	Marko Ivovic	22 December 1990	194 cm (6 ft 4 in)	89 kg (196 lb)	350 cm (140 in)	330 cm (130 in)	Paris Volley UC (FRA)
4	Bojan Janic	11 March 1982	198 cm (6 ft 6 in)	83 kg (183 lb)	345 cm (136 in)	322 cm (127 in)	VC Yaroslavich (RUS)
5	Vlado Petkovic	6 January 1983	198 cm (6 ft 6 in)	97 kg (214 lb)	325 cm (128 in)	318 cm (125 in)	Shahrdari Urmia SC (IRN)
6	Milos Terzic	13 June 1987	202 cm (6 ft 8 in)	88 kg (194 lb)	340 cm (130 in)	320 cm (130 in)	Tours Volleyball (FRA)
7	Dragan Stankovic	18 October 1985	205 cm (6 ft 9 in)	94 kg (207 lb)	343 cm (135 in)	333 cm (131 in)	Lube Banka Macerata (ITA)
8	Marko Samardzic	22 February 1983	190 cm (6 ft 3 in)	82 kg (181 lb)	326 cm (128 in)	310 cm (120 in)	AS Aris Thessaolini (GRE)
9	Nikola Jovovic	13 February 1992	197 cm (6 ft 6 in)	75 kg (165 lb)	335 cm (132 in)	315 cm (124 in)	VfB Frierichshafen (GER)
10	Milos Nikic	31 March 1986	194 cm (6 ft 4 in)	79 kg (174 lb)	350 cm (140 in)	330 cm (130 in)	Gubernia Nizhniy Novgorod (RUS
11	Mihajlo Mitic	17 September 1990	201 cm (6 ft 7 in)	86 kg (190 lb)	335 cm (132 in)	320 cm (130 in)	Sir Safety Perugia (ITA)
12	Milan Rasic	2 February 1985	205 cm (6 ft 9 in)	86 kg (190 lb)	340 cm (130 in)	320 cm (130 in)	ACH Volley Bled (SLO)
13	Tomislav Dokic	27 February 1986	204 cm (6 ft 8 in)	97 kg (214 lb)	355 cm (140 in)	325 cm (128 in)	Foinikas SC Syros Isleand (GRE
14	Aleksandar Atanasijevic	4 September 1991	200 cm (6 ft 7 in)	92 kg (203 lb)	350 cm (140 in)	329 cm (130 in)	Sir Safety Perugia (ITA)
15	Sasa Starovic	19 October 1988	207 cm (6 ft 9 in)	89 kg (196 lb)	335 cm (132 in)	321 cm (126 in)	Andreoli Latina (ITA)
16	Milos Vemic	8 March 1987	202 cm (6 ft 8 in)	90 kg (200 lb)	338 cm (133 in)	320 cm (130 in)	VfB Friedrichshafen (GER)
17	Borislav Petrovic	6 January 1988	201 cm (6 ft 7 in)	96 kg (212 lb)	350 cm (140 in)	330 cm (130 in)	Stade Poitevin VB Pro (FRA)
18	Marko Podrascanin	29 August 1987	203 cm (6 ft 8 in)	100 kg (220 lb)	343 cm (135 in)	326 cm (128 in)	Lube Banka Macerata (ITA)
19	Nikola Rosic	5 August 1984	192 cm (6 ft 4 in)	85 kg (187 lb)	328 cm (129 in)	315 cm (124 in)	Energy Investments Lugano

== United States ==
The following is the roster in the 2010 FIVB Volleyball World League.

No.	Name	Date of birth	Height	Weight	Spike	Block	2010 club
1	Matthew Anderson	18 April 1987	202 cm (6 ft 8 in)	100 kg (220 lb)	360 cm (140 in)	332 cm (131 in)	Zenit Kazan
2	Sean Rooney	13 November 1982	206 cm (6 ft 9 in)	100 kg (220 lb)	354 cm (139 in)	336 cm (132 in)	Woori Card Hansae
3	Evan Patak	23 June 1984	201 cm (6 ft 7 in)	113 kg (249 lb)	363 cm (143 in)	330 cm (130 in)	Toulouse
4	David Lee	8 March 1982	203 cm (6 ft 8 in)	105 kg (231 lb)	350 cm (140 in)	325 cm (128 in)	Lokomotiv Nobosibirsk
5	Richard Lambourne	6 May 1975	190 cm (6 ft 3 in)	90 kg (200 lb)	324 cm (128 in)	312 cm (123 in)	USA Men's Volleyball Team
6	Paul Lotman	3 November 1985	200 cm (6 ft 7 in)	102 kg (225 lb)	336 cm (132 in)	312 cm (123 in)	Asseco Resovia
7	Donald Suxho	21 February 1976	196 cm (6 ft 5 in)	98 kg (216 lb)	337 cm (133 in)	319 cm (126 in)	Trentino Volley
8	William Reid Priddy	1 October 1977	194 cm (6 ft 4 in)	89 kg (196 lb)	353 cm (139 in)	330 cm (130 in)	USA Men's Volleyball Team
9	Ryan Millar	22 January 1978	204 cm (6 ft 8 in)	98 kg (216 lb)	354 cm (139 in)	326 cm (128 in)	Lokomotiv Nobosibirsk
10	Riley Salmon	2 July 1976	198 cm (6 ft 6 in)	89 kg (196 lb)	345 cm (136 in)	331 cm (130 in)	Corozal Plataneros
11	Tyler Hildebrand	28 February 1984	194 cm (6 ft 4 in)	88 kg (194 lb)	334 cm (131 in)	320 cm (130 in)	Tomis Constanta
12	Jayson Jablonsky	23 July 1985	198 cm (6 ft 6 in)	91 kg (201 lb)	345 cm (136 in)	335 cm (132 in)	Fujian Men's Volleyball Club
13	Clayton Stanley	20 January 1978	205 cm (6 ft 9 in)	104 kg (229 lb)	357 cm (141 in)	332 cm (131 in)	Ural UFA
14	Kevin Hansen	19 March 1982	196 cm (6 ft 5 in)	93 kg (205 lb)	349 cm (137 in)	330 cm (130 in)	Arkas Spor
15	Russell Holmes	1 July 1982	205 cm (6 ft 9 in)	95 kg (209 lb)	352 cm (139 in)	335 cm (132 in)	Asseco Resovia
16	Andrew Hein	1 July 1984	210 cm (6 ft 11 in)	105 kg (231 lb)	360 cm (140 in)	345 cm (136 in)	Toulouse OAC-TUC
17	Maxwell Holt	12 March 1987	205 cm (6 ft 9 in)	90 kg (200 lb)	351 cm (138 in)	333 cm (131 in)	Dinamo Moscow
18	Scott Touzinsky	22 April 1982	198 cm (6 ft 6 in)	88 kg (194 lb)	344 cm (135 in)	330 cm (130 in)	SCC Berlin
19	Alfredo Reft	15 December 1982	178 cm (5 ft 10 in)	83 kg (183 lb)	319 cm (126 in)	309 cm (122 in)	USA Men's Volleyball Team
