= Günthör =

Günthör is a surname. Notable people with the surname include:

- Werner Günthör (born 1961), Swiss track and field athlete
- Max Günthör (born 1985), German volleyball player
