= 2010 FIVB Volleyball World League qualification =

The 2010 FIVB Volleyball World League qualification was a qualification tournament to determine the final two spots for the 2010 World League. It was held from 21 August to 19 September 2009.

== Teams ==
| Team | Qualified as |
Second Round
| Japan | 15th place of the 2009 FIVB Volleyball World League |
| Venezuela | 16th place of the 2009 FIVB Volleyball World League |
First Round
| Egypt | African Challenger (No. 16 in the World Ranking) |
| Iran | Asian Challenger (No. 24 in the World Ranking) |
| Mexico | American Challenger (No. 35 in the World Ranking) |
| Germany | European Challenger (No. 13 in the World Ranking) |

== Pool standing procedure ==
1. Match points
2. Number of matches won
3. Points ratio
4. Sets ratio
5. Result of the last match between the tied teams

Match won 3–0 or 3–1: 3 match points for the winner, 0 match points for the loser
Match won 3–2: 2 match points for the winner, 1 match point for the loser

== First round ==
- All times are local.

=== Leg 1 ===
| Pos | Team | Pld | W | L | Pts | SPW | SPL | SPR | SW | SL | SR |
|---|---|---|---|---|---|---|---|---|---|---|---|
| 1 | Germany | 2 | 2 | 0 | 6 | 151 | 109 | 1.385 | 6 | 0 | MAX |
| 2 | Mexico | 2 | 0 | 2 | 0 | 109 | 151 | 0.722 | 0 | 6 | 0.000 |

| Date | Time | | Score | | Set 1 | Set 2 | Set 3 | Set 4 | Set 5 | Total | Report |
|---|---|---|---|---|---|---|---|---|---|---|---|
| 21 Aug | 19:00 | Germany | 3–0 | Mexico | 25–18 | 25–20 | 25–16 | | | 75–54 | P2 P3 |
| 22 Aug | 16:00 | Germany | 3–0 | Mexico | 25–17 | 26–24 | 25–14 | | | 76–55 | P2 P3 |

=== Leg 2 ===
| Pos | Team | Pld | W | L | Pts | SPW | SPL | SPR | SW | SL | SR |
|---|---|---|---|---|---|---|---|---|---|---|---|
| 1 | Egypt | 2 | 2 | 0 | 6 | 150 | 124 | 1.210 | 6 | 0 | MAX |
| 2 | Iran | 2 | 0 | 2 | 0 | 124 | 150 | 0.827 | 0 | 6 | 0.000 |

| Date | Time | | Score | | Set 1 | Set 2 | Set 3 | Set 4 | Set 5 | Total | Report |
|---|---|---|---|---|---|---|---|---|---|---|---|
| 04 Sep | 21:30 | Egypt | 3–0 | Iran | 25–22 | 25–21 | 25–23 | | | 75–66 | P2 P3 |
| 05 Sep | 21:30 | Egypt | 3–0 | Iran | 25–18 | 25–17 | 25–23 | | | 75–58 | P2 P3 |

== Second round ==
- All times are local.

=== Leg 1 ===
| Pos | Team | Pld | W | L | Pts | SPW | SPL | SPR | SW | SL | SR |
|---|---|---|---|---|---|---|---|---|---|---|---|
| 1 | Germany | 2 | 2 | 0 | 6 | 150 | 119 | 1.261 | 6 | 0 | MAX |
| 2 | Venezuela | 2 | 0 | 2 | 0 | 119 | 150 | 0.793 | 0 | 6 | 0.000 |

| Date | Time | | Score | | Set 1 | Set 2 | Set 3 | Set 4 | Set 5 | Total | Report |
|---|---|---|---|---|---|---|---|---|---|---|---|
| 18 Sep | 19:00 | Germany | 3–0 | Venezuela | 25–21 | 25–18 | 25–22 | | | 75–61 | P2 P3 |
| 19 Sep | 16:00 | Germany | 3–0 | Venezuela | 25–19 | 25–23 | 25–16 | | | 75–58 | P2 P3 |

=== Leg 2 ===
| Pos | Team | Pld | W | L | Pts | SPW | SPL | SPR | SW | SL | SR |
|---|---|---|---|---|---|---|---|---|---|---|---|
| 1 | Egypt | 2 | 2 | 0 | 6 | 193 | 169 | 1.142 | 6 | 2 | 3.000 |
| 2 | Japan | 2 | 0 | 2 | 0 | 169 | 193 | 0.876 | 2 | 6 | 0.333 |

| Date | Time | | Score | | Set 1 | Set 2 | Set 3 | Set 4 | Set 5 | Total | Report |
|---|---|---|---|---|---|---|---|---|---|---|---|
| 18 Sep | 21:30 | Egypt | 3–1 | Japan | 25–21 | 25–17 | 21–25 | 25–21 | | 96–84 | P2 P3 |
| 19 Sep | 21:30 | Egypt | 3–1 | Japan | 22–25 | 25–23 | 25–15 | 25–22 | | 97–85 | P2 P3 |
