= Ural Ufa =

Russian volleyball club

- Full name: Volleyball Club Ural Ufa
- Founded: 1992
- Ground: Dynamo Sport Complex (Capacity: 1,000)
- Chairman: Valery Bagmetov
- Manager: Andrei Voronkov
- Captain: Egor Feoktistov
- League: Super League
- 2022/23: 10th
- Website: Club home page

Uniforms
Home	Away

Ural Ufa (Russian: «Урал» Уфа, Bashkir: «Урал» Өфө) – is a Russian professional men's volleyball club, based in Ufa, playing in Russian Volleyball Super League since 1996. The club was founded in 1992.

== Achievements ==
- CEV Challenge Cup

Runners-up (1): 2013

- Russian Championship

Runners-up (1): 2013

== Team roster ==
=== 2023/2024 ===
Head coach: (Russia) Andrei Voronkov

No.	Name	Date of birth	Position
1	(Russia) Andrey Ushkov	July 5, 1999 (age 27)	setter
2	(Serbia) Uroš Kovačević	May 6, 1993 (age 33)	outside hitter
3	(Russia) Evgeniy Rybakov	March 3, 1995 (age 31)	opposite
4	(Russia) Artiom Melnikov	June 28, 1999 (age 27)	middle blocker
5	(Russia) Egor Yakutin	January 27, 1997 (age 29)	middle blocker
8	(Russia) Aleksandr Gutsalyuk	January 15, 1988 (age 38)	middle blocker
11	(Iran) Milad Ebadipour	October 17, 1993 (age 32)	outside hitter
12	(Russia) Aleksandr Butko	March 18, 1986 (age 40)	setter
14	(Russia) Nikita Ivankov	August 24, 1999 (age 27)	outside hitter
15	(Russia) Igor Frolov	November 2, 1999 (age 26)	libero
17	(Russia) Egor Feoktistov	June 22, 1993 (age 33)	outside hitter
20	(Belarus) Maksim Budziukhin	December 13, 1992 (age 33)	libero
22	(Russia) Roman Potalyuk	August 28, 2001 (age 25)	outside hitter
23	(Russia) Danil Kharitonov	May 25, 2001 (age 25)	outside hitter
24	(Russia) Anton Anoshko	March 25, 2001 (age 25)	setter
26	(Russia) Viktor Pivovarov	August 22, 1999 (age 27)	outside hitter
–	(Russia) Nikita Gorbanov	August 31, 2001 (age 25)	middle blocker
–	(Russia) Pavel Tebenikhin	January 11, 2002 (age 24)	middle blocker

Team roster - season 2010/2011
No.	Name	Date of birth	Position
1	(Russia) Alexey Samoylenko	June 23, 1985	middle blocker
2	(Russia) Oleg Samsonychev	March 22, 1982	setter
3	(United States) Clayton Stanley	January 20, 1978	opposite
4	(Russia) Denis Garkushenko	February 9, 1977	setter
5	(Russia) Andrey Maksimov	July 4, 1985	opposite
6	(Russia) Vladimir Syomshchikov	August 31, 1987	middle blocker
7	(Russia) Maxim Botin	July 15, 1983	outside hitter
8	(Russia) Alexey Bovduy	October 26, 1977	outside hitter
9	(Russia) Artem Ermakov	March 16, 1982	libero
10	(Russia) Roman Danilov	January 4, 1985	outside hitter
12	(Russia) Artëm Volvich	January 22, 1990	middle blocker
13	(Russia) Grigory Afinogenov	March 25, 1980	middle blocker
15	(Germany) Robert Kromm	March 9, 1984	outside hitter

== Notable players ==
Notable, former or current players of club, who are medalist of intercontinental tournaments in national teams or clubs.

- 2003–2006 (Bulgaria) Nikolay Ivanov
- 2004–2006 (Cuba) Osmany Juantorena
- 2005–2006 (Russia) Taras Khtey
- 2006–2007 (Bulgaria) Todor Aleksiev
- 2008–2010 (Hungary) Péter Veres
- 2008–2010 (Russia) Konstantin Ushakov
- 2009–2011 (Russia) Artem Volvich
- 2010–2011 (Germany) Robert Kromm
- 2010–2012 (United States) Clayton Stanley
- 2012–2013 (Spain) Miguel Ángel Falasca
- 2012–2013 (Russia) Aleksey Verbov
- 2012–2013 (Russia) Andrey Ashchev
- 2012–2013 (Brazil) Leandro Vissotto
- 2012–2013, 2019–2020 (Russia) Aleksey Spiridonov
- 2013–2014 (Serbia) Nikola Kovačević
- 2013–2024 (Russia) Egor Feoktistov
- 2015–2016 (Russia) Aleksandr Volkov
- 2015–2019 (Russia) Dmitry Kovalev
- 2019–2020 (Serbia) Nikola Jovović
- 2019–2020 (Russia) Sergey Makarov
- 2019–2020 (Russia) Denis Biryukov
- 2021–2024 (Russia) Alexander Gutsalyuk
- 2022–2023 (Iran) Amirhossein Esfandiar
- 2022–2023 (Argentina) Maximiliano Cavanna
- 2023–2024 (Russia) Aleksandr Butko
- 2023–2024 (Iran) Milad Ebadipour
- 2023–2024 (Serbia) Uroš Kovačević
- 2024–present (Russia) Sergey Savin
- 2024–present (Serbia) Petar Krsmanović
