= Egor Feoktistov =

Russian volleyball player (born 1993)

Personal information
- Nationality: Russian
- Born: 22 June 1993 (age 33); Bashkortostan, Russia
- Height: 2.01 m (6 ft 7 in)
- Weight: 93 kg (205 lb)
- Spike: 340 cm (134 in)
- Block: 329 cm (130 in)

Volleyball information
- Position: Outside spiker
- Current club: Ural Ufa
- Number: 17

National team
Russia
Honours
European Championship
Gold medal – first place	2017 Poland

Egor Nikolayevich Feoktistov (Russian: Егор Николаевич Феоктистов; born 22 June 1993) is a Russian volleyball player for Ural Ufa and the Russian national team.

He participated at the 2017 Men's European Volleyball Championship.
