= Marcus Böhme =

German volleyball player (born 1985)

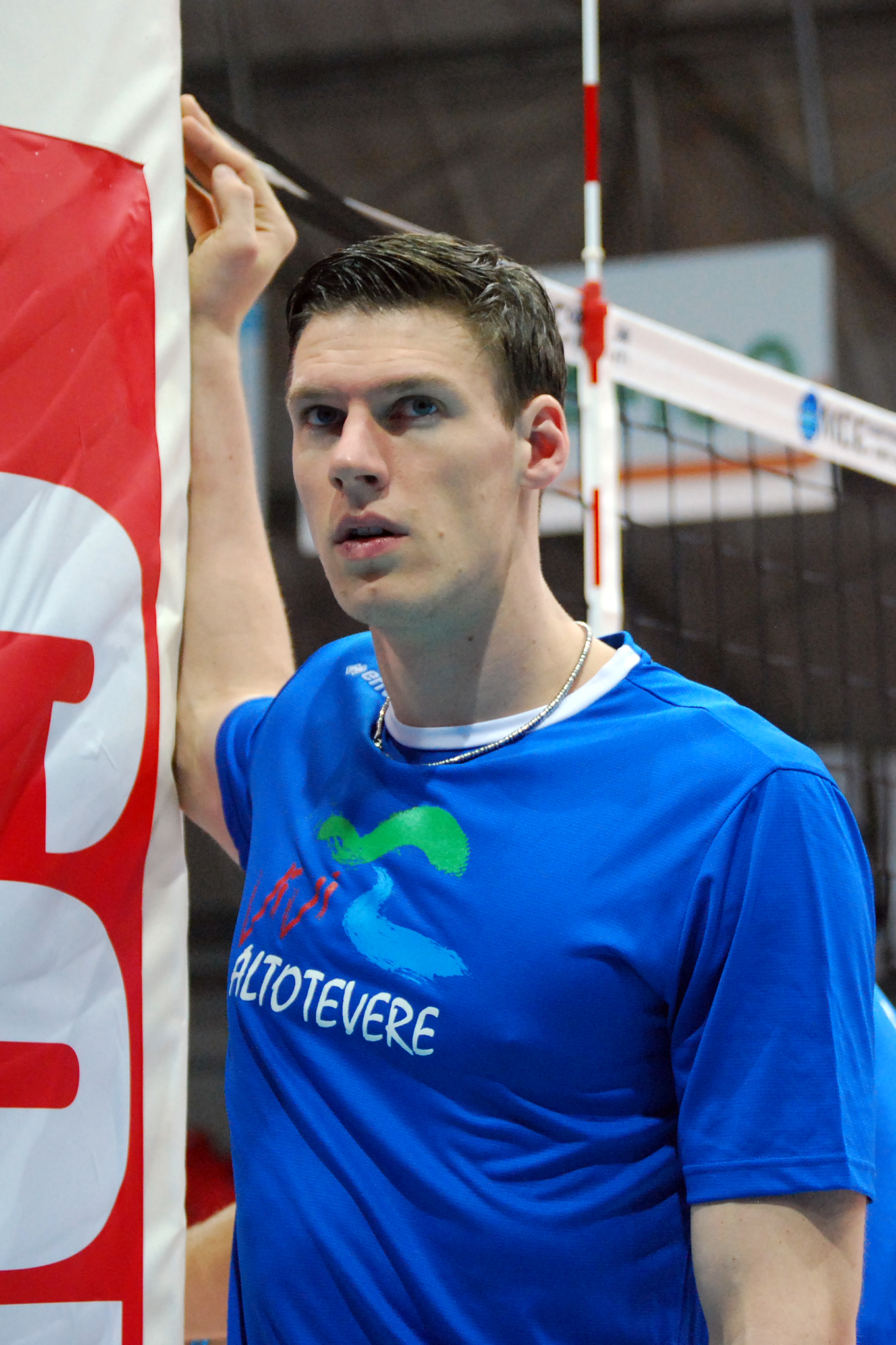

Personal information
- Nationality: German
- Born: 25 August 1985 (age 41); Berlin, Germany
- Height: 2.12 m (6 ft 11 in)
- Weight: 116 kg (256 lb)
- Spike: 350 cm (138 in)
- Block: 335 cm (132 in)

Volleyball information
- Position: Middle blocker
- Current club: VfB Friedrichshafen
- Number: 11

Career
Years	Teams
2005–2009; 2009–2012; 2012–2013; 2013–2014; 2014–2015; 2015–2017; 2017–2019; 2019–2020; 2020–	Berlin Recycling Volleys; VfB Friedrichshafen; Altotevere Volley; Generali Unterhaching; Fenerbahçe İstanbul; Cuprum Lubin; Olympiacos Piraeus; Dynamo LO; VfB Friedrichshafen

National team
2006–	Germany (290 caps)
Honours
Men's volleyball
Representing Germany
FIVB World Championship
Bronze medal – third place	2014 Poland
CEV European Championship
Silver medal – second place	2017 Poland
European Games
Gold medal – first place	2015 Azerbaijan
European League
Gold medal – first place	2009 Portugal

Marcus Böhme (born 25 August 1985) is a German professional volleyball player, a member of the Germany national team. The bronze medallist at the 2014 World Championship, and the 2009 European League winner. At the professional club level, he plays for VfB Friedrichshafen.

== Honours ==
=== Clubs ===
- CEV Challenge Cup
  - 2017/2018 – with Olympiacos Piraeus
- National championships
  - 2007/2008 German Championship, with Berlin Recycling Volleys
  - 2009/2010 German Championship, with VfB Friedrichshafen
  - 2010/2011 German Championship, with VfB Friedrichshafen
  - 2011/2012 German Cup, with VfB Friedrichshafen
  - 2017/2018 Greek League Cup, with Olympiacos Piraeus
  - 2017/2018 Greek Championship, with Olympiacos Piraeus
  - 2018/2019 Greek League Cup, with Olympiacos Piraeus
  - 2018/2019 Greek Championship, with Olympiacos Piraeus
  - 2020/2021 German Championship, with VfB Friedrichshafen
  - 2021/2022 German Cup, with VfB Friedrichshafen
  - 2021/2022 German Championship, with VfB Friedrichshafen
  - 2022/2023 German Championship, with VfB Friedrichshafen

=== Individual awards ===
- 2003: CEV U19 European Championship – Best Middle Blocker
- 2004: CEV U20 European Championship – Best Middle Blocker
- 2014: FIVB World Championship – Best Middle Blocker
- 2017: CEV European Championship – Best Middle Blocker

Awards
Preceded by (Cuba) Robertlandy Simón	Best Middle Blocker of FIVB World Championship; 2014 ex aequo (Poland) Karol Kłos	Succeeded by (Brazil) Lucas Saatkamp (Poland) Piotr Nowakowski
Preceded by (Bulgaria) Teodor Todorov (Bulgaria) Viktor Yosifov	Best Middle Blocker of CEV European Championship; 2017 ex aequo (Serbia) Srećko Lisinac	Succeeded by (Slovenia) Jan Kozamernik (Serbia) Srećko Lisinac
