= Sebastian Schwarz (volleyball) =

German volleyball player (born 1985)

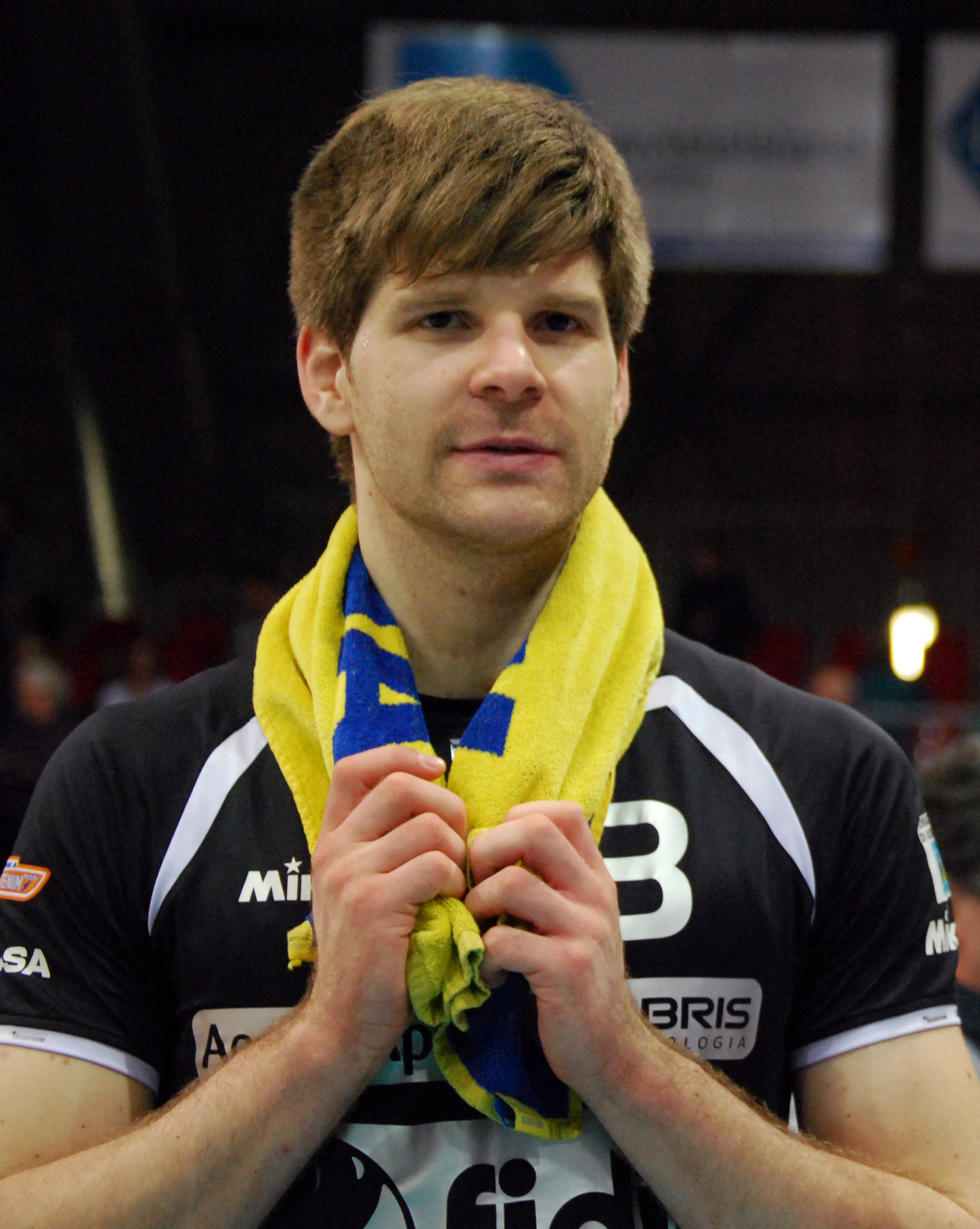

Personal information
- Full name: Sebastian Schwarz
- Nationality: German
- Born: October 2, 1985 (age 41); Freudenstadt, West Germany
- Height: 1.97 m (6 ft 6 in)
- Weight: 94 kg (207 lb)
- Spike: 340 cm (130 in)
- Block: 325 cm (128 in)

Volleyball information
- Position: Outside hitter
- Current club: Jastrzębski Węgiel
- Number: 9

Career
Years	Teams
2002–2003; 2003–2004; 2004–2005; 2005–2007; 2007–2008; 2008–2010; 2010–2011; 2011–2012; 2012–2013; 2013–2014; 2014–2016; 2016–2017; 2017–	VBC Nagold; TV Rottenburg; VfB Friedrichshafen; VC Olympia Berlin; VfB Friedrichshafen; Reima Crema; Generali Unterhaching; RPA-LuigiBacchi.it Perugia; Sempre Volley; Sir Safety Perugia; Generali Unterhaching; Lotos Trefl Gdańsk; Kuzbass Kemerovo; Jastrzębski Węgiel

National team
2006–	Germany
Honours
Representing Germany
Men's volleyball
World Championship
Bronze medal – third place	2014 Poland
European League
Gold medal – first place	2009 Portugal
- Last updated: 1 March 2017

Sebastian Schwarz (born 2 October 1985) is a German volleyball player, a member of Germany men's national volleyball team and Polish club Jastrzębski Węgiel, a gold medalist of the 2009 European League, a bronze medalist of the 2014 World Championship.

== Career ==
=== Clubs ===
On September 4, 2014 it was officially announced that Schwarz had joined the Polish club Lotos Trefl Gdańsk. He signed a one-year contract. On April 19, 2015 Lotos Trefl Gdańsk, including Schwarz, achieved the Polish Cup 2015. Then he won silver medal of Polish Championship. After half of season in Russian Kuzbass Kemerovo he decided to come back to PlusLiga and joined Jastrzębski Węgiel on March 1, 2017.

== Sporting achievements ==
=== Clubs ===
==== CEV Champions League ====
- 2006/2007 - with VfB Friedrichshafen

==== National championships ====
- 2005/2006 German Cup, with VfB Friedrichshafen
- 2005/2006 German Championship, with VfB Friedrichshafen
- 2006/2007 German Cup, with VfB Friedrichshafen
- 2006/2007 German Championship, with VfB Friedrichshafen
- 2008/2009 German Cup, with Generali Unterhaching
- 2008/2009 German Championship, with Generali Unterhaching
- 2009/2010 German Cup, with Generali Unterhaching
- 2009/2010 German Championship, with Generali Unterhaching
- 2014/2015 Polish Cup, with Lotos Trefl Gdańsk
- 2014/2015 Polish Championship, with Lotos Trefl Gdańsk
- 2015/2016 Polish SuperCup 2015, with Lotos Trefl Gdańsk
- 2016/2017 Polish Championship, with Jastrzębski Węgiel

=== National team ===
- 2009 European League
- 2014 FIVB World Championship
