= Ferdinand Tille =

German volleyball player (born 1988)

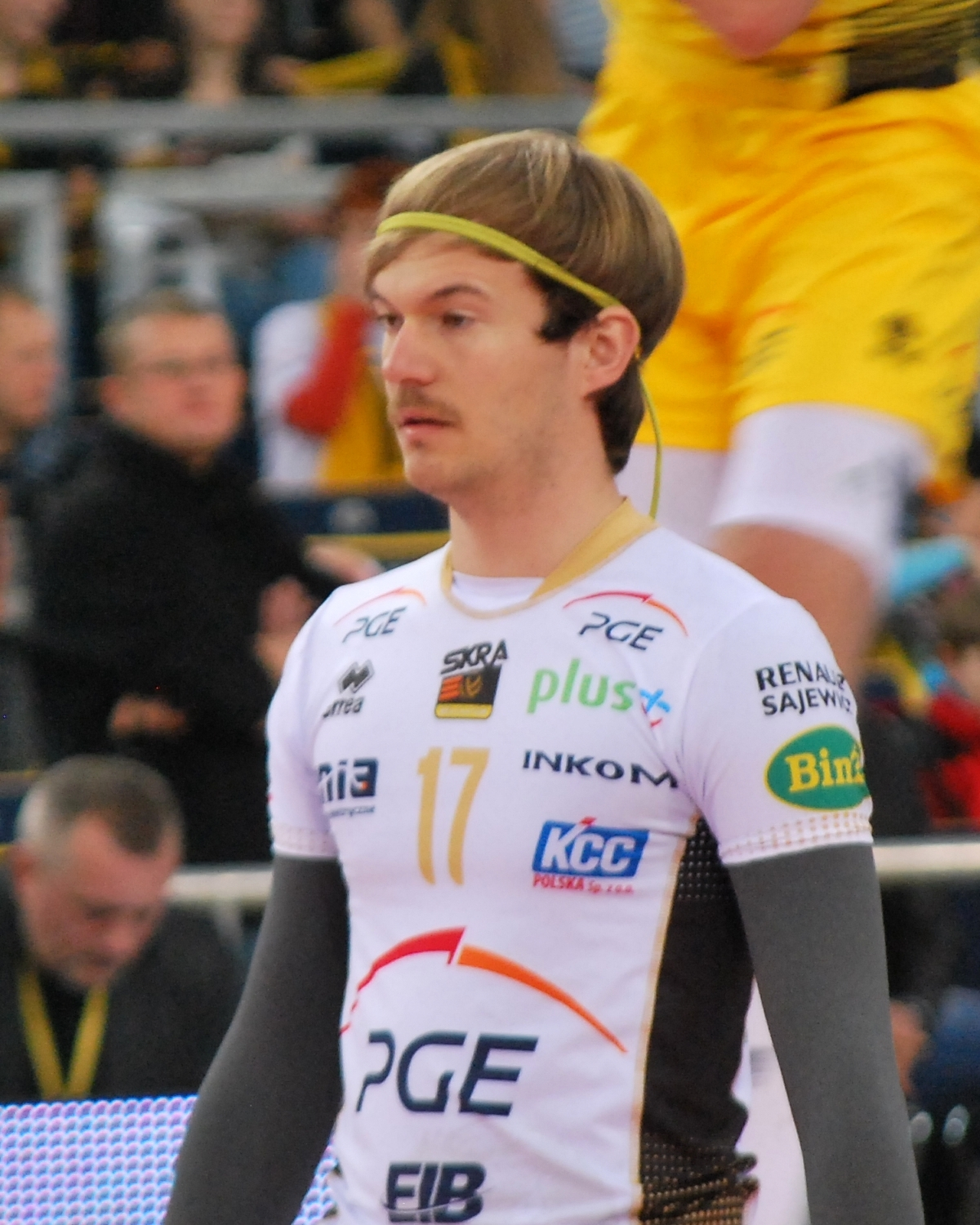

Personal information
- Nationality: German
- Born: 8 December 1988 (age 37); Mühldorf, West Germany
- Height: 1.85 m (6 ft 1 in)
- Weight: 75 kg (165 lb)
- Spike: 338 cm (133 in)
- Block: 316 cm (124 in)

Volleyball information
- Position: Libero
- Current club: WWK Volleys Herrsching

Career
Years	Teams
1996-2004; 2004–2005; 2005–2006; 2006–2011; 2011–2013; 2013–2014; 2014–2015; 2015–	TSV Mühldorf; SV Lohhof; VCO Kempfenhausen; Generali Unterhaching; Arago de Sète; Generali Unterhaching; PGE Skra Bełchatów; WWK Volleys Herrsching

National team
2009–	Germany
Honours
Men's volleyball
Representing Germany
World Championship
Bronze medal – third place	2014 Poland	Team
European League
Gold medal – first place	2009 Portugal	Team
European Games
Gold medal – first place	2015 Baku	Team
- Last updated: 21 February 2017

Ferdinand Tille (born 8 December 1988) is a German volleyball player, a member of Germany men's national volleyball team and German club WWK Volleys Herrsching, a gold medalist of European League 2009, a bronze medalist of the World Championship 2014.

== Career ==
=== Clubs ===
On 27 May 2014 it was announced that Tille was a new player of Polish club PGE Skra Bełchatów. On 8 October 2014 his team won ENEA Polish SuperCup 2014. On 6 May 2015 he won with PGE Skra Bełchatów the bronze medal of the Polish Championship. In May 2015 he signed a contract with WWK Volleys Herrsching.

== Sporting achievements ==
=== Clubs ===
==== National championships ====
- 2007/2008 German Championship, with Generali Unterhaching
- 2008/2009 German Cup, with Generali Unterhaching
- 2008/2009 German Championship, with Generali Unterhaching
- 2009/2010 German Cup, with Generali Unterhaching
- 2009/2010 German Championship, with Generali Unterhaching
- 2010/2011 German Cup, with Generali Unterhaching
- 2011/2012 French Championship, with Arago de Sète
- 2012/2013 French Championship, with Arago de Sète
- 2014/2015 Polish SuperCup2014, with PGE Skra Bełchatów
- 2014/2015 Polish Championship, with PGE Skra Bełchatów

=== National team ===
- 2009 European League
- 2014 FIVB World Championship
- 2015 European Games

=== Individual ===
- 2010 FIVB World Championship - Best Libero

Awards
Preceded by (Russia) Aleksey Verbov	Best Libero of FIVB World Championship; 2010	Succeeded by (France) Jenia Grebennikov
