= Nikola Kovačević (volleyball) =

Serbian volleyball player

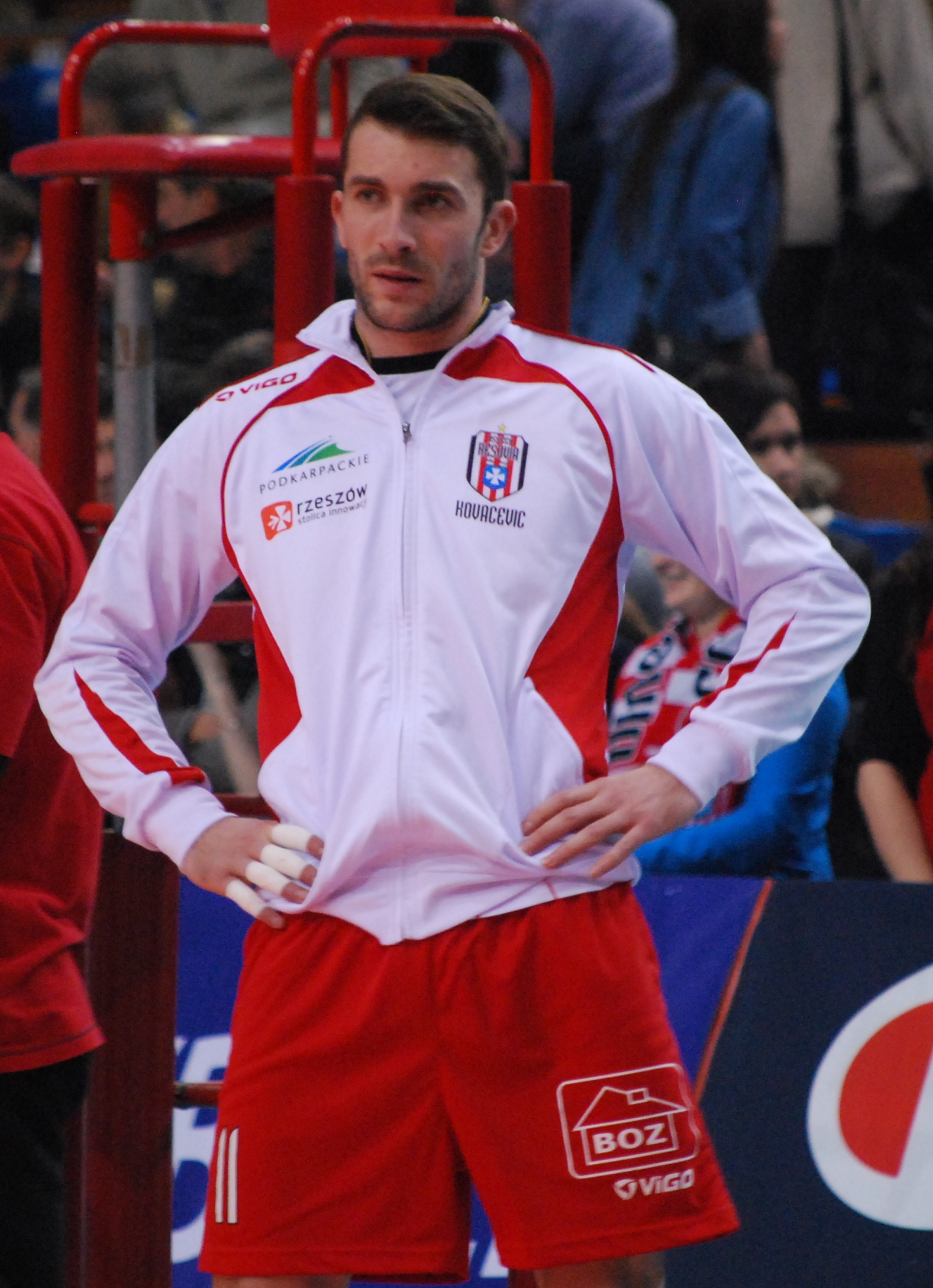

Personal information
- Nationality: (Serbia) Serbian
- Born: 14 February 1983 (age 43); Kraljevo, SR Serbia, SFR Yugoslavia
- Height: 1.93 m (6 ft 4 in)
- Weight: 78 kg (172 lb)
- Spike: 350 cm (140 in)
- Block: 340 cm (130 in)

Volleyball information
- Position: Outside hitter
- Current team: (France) Saint Nazaire VB
- Number: 8

Career
Years	Teams
2002–2003; 2003–2006; 2006–2007; 2007–2009; 2009–2010; 2010–2011; 2011–2012; 2012–2013; 2013–2014; 2014; 2014–2015; 2015; 2015–2016; 2016; 2017; 2017; 2017–2018; 2018–2019; 2019; 2020	(Federal Republic of Yugoslavia) Ribnica Kraljevo (Federal Republic of Yugoslavia) Crvena Zvezda (Greece) GC Lamia (Italy) RPA Perugia (Greece) Aris Thessaloniki (Italy) Andreoli Latina (Russia) Guberniya Nizhniy Novgorod (Poland) Asseco Resovia Rzeszów (Russia) Ural Ufa (Italy) Marmi Lanza Verona (China) Shanghai Golden Age (France) Paris Volley (Russia) Lokomotiv Novosibirsk (Germany) Berlin Recycling Volleys (Iran) Paykan Tehran (France) Rennes Volley 35 (Romania) CS Arcada Galați (Poland) Chemik Bydgoszcz (Saudi Arabia) Al-Hilal (France) Saint Nazaire VB

National team
2005–2016	Serbia
Honours
Men's volleyball
Representing Serbia
World Championship
Bronze medal – third place	2010 Italy
European Championship
Gold medal – first place	2011 Austria/Czech Republic
Bronze medal – third place	2007 Russia
Bronze medal – third place	2013 Denmark/Poland
World League
Silver medal – second place	2008 Rio de Janeiro
Silver medal – second place	2009 Belgrade
Silver medal – second place	2015 Rio de Janeiro
Bronze medal – third place	2010 Cordoba
Mediterranean Games
Bronze medal – third place	2005 Almería

Nikola Kovačević (Serbian Cyrillic: Никола Ковачевић, born 14 February 1983) is a Serbian volleyball player, a member of Serbia men's national volleyball team and French club Saint Nazaire VB, bronze medalist of the World Championship 2010, European Champion 2011, bronze medalist of the European Championship in 2007 and 2013, multimedalist of the World League.

== Personal life ==
He has two brothers - Uroš (born 1993), who is also a volleyball player, and Savo. He was married to Jasmine and has two children with her, daughters Mia and Emma. In May 2016 he married Ana (nee Matijasević), who is a daughter of volleyball coach Nikola Matijasević and sister of volleyball players' manager Georges Matijasević. With Ana he has two sons Noa and Teo

== Career ==
=== Clubs ===
In season 2012/2013 he played for Polish club from PlusLiga – Asseco Resovia Rzeszów. He won with the club Polish Championship in 2013. He spent the next season in the Russian club Ural Ufa. On 17 March 2014 official site of Russian club announced that the contract with Kovacevic has been terminated. The reason for the premature termination of contract were financial problems of the club. In 2014 he spent a few months in the club from Verona and then moved to Chinese team Fudan University Shanghai.

=== National team ===
He is a gold medalist of 2011 European Championship and bronze medalist of 2013 European Championship. He was a member of the national team at the 2012 Summer Olympics in London. On 19 July 2015 Serbian national team with him in squad went to the final of World League, but they lost with France 0–3 and achieved silver medal.

== Sporting achievements ==
- National championships
  - 2002/2003 Serbian Championship, with Crvena Zvezda
  - 2009/2010 Greek Championship, with Aris Thessaloniki
  - 2012/2013 Polish Championship, with Asseco Resovia Rzeszów
  - 2014/2015 Chinese Championship, with Shanghai Golden Age
  - 2014/2015 French Championship, with Paris Volley
  - 2016/2017 Iranian Championship, with Paykan Tehran
  - 2017/2018 Romanian SuperCup, with CS Arcada Galați
  - 2017/2018 Romanian Championship, with Paykan Tehran
- National team
  - 2007 CEV European Championship
  - 2008 FIVB World League
  - 2009 FIVB World League
  - 2010 FIVB World League
  - 2010 FIVB World Championship
  - 2011 CEV European Championship
  - 2013 CEV European Championship
  - 2015 FIVB World League

=== Individually ===
- 2011: CEV European Championship – Best Receiver
- 2015: Chinese Championship – Best Receiver

Awards
Preceded by (France) Stéphane Antiga	Best Receiver of CEV European Championship; 2011	Succeeded by (Bulgaria) Todor Aleksiev
