= Dirk Westphal (volleyball) =

German volleyball player (born 1986)

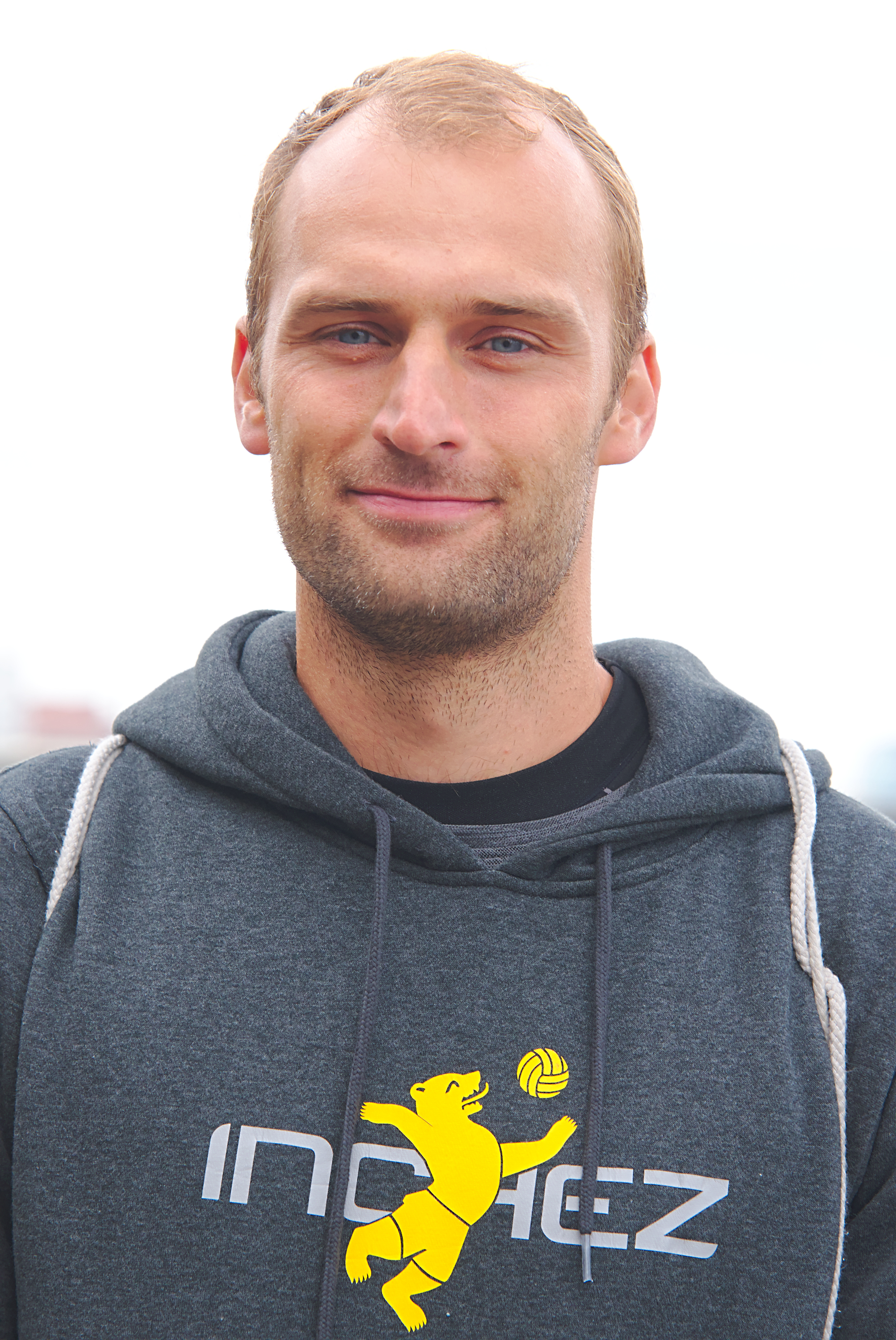
- Dirk Westphal in 2018

Personal information
- Full name: Dirk Westphal
- Nationality: German
- Born: January 31, 1986 (age 40); Berlin, West Germany
- Hometown: Prenzlauer Berg, Berlin, Germany
- Height: 2.03 m (6 ft 8 in)
- Weight: 92 kg (203 lb)
- Spike: 355 cm (140 in)

Volleyball information
- Position: Outside hitter
- Current club: Shahrdari Tabriz VC

Career
Years	Teams
1994–2002; 2002–2005; 2005–2009; 2009–2010; 2010–2011; 2011–2012; 2012–2013; 2013–2015; 2015–2016; 2016–2017	TSC Berlin; VC Olympia Berlin; Berlin Recycling Volleys; Prisma Volley; Fenice Isernia; VC Euphony Asse-Lennik; Knack Randstad Roeselare; Cerrad Czarni Radom; Nantes Rezé Volley; Shahrdari Tabriz

National team
2011–	Germany (69)
Honours
Representing Germany
Men's volleyball
World Championship
Bronze medal – third place	2014 Poland
European League
Gold medal – first place	2009 Portugal
- Last updated: 13 February 2017

Dirk Westphal (born January 31, 1986) is a German volleyball player, a member of Germany men's national volleyball team and Iranian club Shahrdari Tabriz VC, a gold medalist of European League 2009, a bronze medalist of the World Championship 2014.

== Personal life ==
Westphal was born in Berlin, Germany. He is a son of Rolf and Petra (née Brandwein). In the years 1996-2006 he attended the sports school Coubertin-Gymnasium in Berlin. Then he did his military service in Nienburg, Lower Saxony and in sports group of the Bundeswehr in Mitte. He has girlfriend and two children.

== Career ==
=== National team ===
In 2014 played at World Championship 2014 held in Poland. Germany won the match for the bronze medal with France.

== Sporting achievements ==
=== Clubs ===
==== National championships ====
- 2007/2008 German Championship, with SCC Berlin
- 2012/2013 Belgium Cup, with Knack Randstad Roeselare
- 2012/2013 Belgium Championship, with Knack Randstad Roeselare

=== National team ===
- 2009 European League
- 2014 FIVB World Championship
