= 2009 Men's European Volleyball League =

Tournament details
- Host country: Portugal
- Dates: June 5 – July 12 (qualification); July 18/19 (final four)
- Teams: 12
- Venue: 1 (in 1 host city)

Final positions
- Champions: Germany (1st title)

Tournament awards
- MVP: (Germany) Jochen Schöps

The 2009 Men's European Volleyball League was the sixth edition of the annual men's volleyball tournament, played by twelve European countries from June 5 to July 12, 2009. The final Four was held in Portimão, Portugal from July 18 to July 19.

The tournament was won by Germany, defeating the Spain by 3–2 in the finals.

== Teams ==
- Austria
- Belarus
- Belgium
- Croatia
- Germany
- Greece
- Great Britain
- Portugal
- Romania
- Slovakia
- Spain
- Turkey

== League round ==
=== Pool A ===
Pos	Team	Pld	W	L	Pts	SW	SL	SR	SPW	SPL	SPR	Qualification
1	Spain	12	12	0	24	36	9	4.000	1079	891	1.211	Final Four
2	Turkey	12	8	4	20	30	16	1.875	1076	983	1.095	
3	Great Britain	12	4	8	16	15	27	0.556	905	985	0.919	
4	Croatia	12	0	12	12	7	36	0.194	848	1049	0.808	

==== Leg 1 ====
Date	Time		Score		Set 1	Set 2	Set 3	Set 4	Set 5	Total	Report
5 Jun	19:30	Spain	3–0	Great Britain	25–23	25–23	25–16			75–62	Report
6 Jun	16:30	Turkey	3–0	Croatia	25–12	25–19	25–17			75–48	Report
6 Jun	19:30	Spain	3–1	Great Britain	25–12	25–21	23–25	25–20		98–78	Report
7 Jun	15:30	Turkey	3–1	Croatia	25–18	21–25	25–14	25–22		96–79	Report

==== Leg 2 ====
Date	Time		Score		Set 1	Set 2	Set 3	Set 4	Set 5	Total	Report
12 Jun	20:30	Spain	3–1	Turkey	25–20	23–25	25–17	25–18		98–80	Report
13 Jun	17:30	Spain	3–1	Turkey	25–15	22–25	25–20	25–19		97–79	Report
13 Jun	18:00	Great Britain	3–0	Croatia	25–16	25–22	25–23			75–61	Report
13 Jun	17:00	Great Britain	3–1	Croatia	24–26	25–18	25–16	25–18		99–78	Report

==== Leg 3 ====
Date	Time		Score		Set 1	Set 2	Set 3	Set 4	Set 5	Total	Report
20 Jun	16:30	Turkey	3–0	Great Britain	25–14	25–16	25–20			75–50	Report
20 Jun	17:30	Croatia	0–3	Spain	22–25	24–26	14–25			60–76	Report
21 Jun	15:30	Turkey	3–1	Great Britain	31–29	25–27	25–22	25–19		106–97	Report
21 Jun	19:00	Croatia	0–3	Spain	18–25	13–25	22–25			53–75	Report

==== Leg 4 ====
Date	Time		Score		Set 1	Set 2	Set 3	Set 4	Set 5	Total	Report
26 Jun	20:30	Spain	3–1	Croatia	21–25	25–17	25–14	25–17		96–73	Report
27 Jun	16:00	Spain	3–1	Croatia	24–26	25–19	25–16	25–22		99–83	Report
27 Jun	18:00	Great Britain	1–3	Turkey	25–21	18–25	21–25	17–25		81–96	Report
28 Jun	17:00	Great Britain	0–3	Turkey	28–30	23–25	20–25			71–80	Report

==== Leg 5 ====
Date	Time		Score		Set 1	Set 2	Set 3	Set 4	Set 5	Total	Report
4 Jul	18:00	Croatia	0–3	Great Britain	23–25	18–25	23–25			64–75	Report
4 Jul	18:00	Turkey	2–3	Spain	25–22	20–25	25–20	25–27	11–15	106–109	Report
5 Jul	17:00	Turkey	2–3	Spain	25–23	20–25	23–25	25–18	13–15	106–106	Report
5 Jul	19:00	Croatia	2–3	Great Britain	21–25	25–22	22–25	25–19	9–15	102–106	Report

==== Leg 6 ====
Date	Time		Score		Set 1	Set 2	Set 3	Set 4	Set 5	Total	Report
11 Jul	12:00	Croatia	1–3	Turkey	26–24	22–25	20–25	26–28		94–102	Report
11 Jul	15:00	Great Britain	0–3	Spain	20–25	20–25	22–25			62–75	Report
12 Jul	15:00	Great Britain	0–3	Spain	18–25	16–25	15–25			49–75	Report
12 Jul	18:00	Croatia	0–3	Turkey	18–25	17–25	18–25			53–75	Report

=== Pool B ===
Pos	Team	Pld	W	L	Pts	SW	SL	SR	SPW	SPL	SPR	Qualification
1	Germany	12	8	4	20	31	17	1.824	1091	1009	1.081	Final Four
2	Belgium	12	8	4	20	30	20	1.500	1117	1075	1.039	
3	Greece	12	4	8	16	20	29	0.690	1067	1113	0.959	
4	Romania	12	4	8	16	17	32	0.531	1057	1133	0.933	

==== Leg 1 ====
Date	Time		Score		Set 1	Set 2	Set 3	Set 4	Set 5	Total	Report
5 Jun	19:00	Greece	1–3	Belgium	22–25	33–35	25–20	23–25		103–105	Report
6 Jun	17:00	Greece	3–2	Belgium	25–15	19–25	21–25	25–23	15–11	105–99	Report
6 Jun	20:30	Romania	3–2	Germany	25–15	22–25	25–27	25–18	19–17	116–102	Report
7 Jun	20:30	Romania	1–3	Germany	22–25	25–19	19–25	23–25		89–94	Report

==== Leg 2 ====
Date	Time		Score		Set 1	Set 2	Set 3	Set 4	Set 5	Total	Report
12 Jun	20:00	Belgium	2–3	Germany	25–22	18–25	23–25	25–22	12–15	103–109	Report
13 Jun	17:00	Greece	3–0	Romania	25–15	25–23	28–26			78–64	Report
14 Jun	15:00	Belgium	3–2	Germany	22–25	25–19	18–25	25–20	15–13	105–102	Report
14 Jun	19:00	Greece	3–2	Romania	23–25	25–19	25–22	22–25	15–11	110–102	Report

==== Leg 3 ====
Date	Time		Score		Set 1	Set 2	Set 3	Set 4	Set 5	Total	Report
20 Jun	19:30	Germany	3–0	Greece	25–20	25–17	25–22			75–59	Report
20 Jun	20:30	Romania	1–3	Belgium	16–25	21–25	25–21	26–28		88–99	Report
21 Jun	16:00	Germany	3–0	Greece	25–16	25–21	25–20			75–57	Report
21 Jun	20:30	Romania	3–2	Belgium	25–22	25–27	22–25	25–23	15–6	112–103	Report

==== Leg 4 ====
Date	Time		Score		Set 1	Set 2	Set 3	Set 4	Set 5	Total	Report
26 Jun	20:00	Belgium	3–0	Romania	25–22	25–20	25–22			75–64	Report
26 Jun	20:30	Greece	1–3	Germany	20–25	27–25	25–27	17–25		89–102	Report
27 Jun	19:00	Greece	3–1	Germany	18–25	25–20	25–20	25–23		93–88	Report
28 Jun	20:00	Belgium	3–0	Romania	25–22	25–19	29–27			79–68	Report

==== Leg 5 ====
Date	Time		Score		Set 1	Set 2	Set 3	Set 4	Set 5	Total	Report
4 Jul	17:30	Romania	3–2	Greece	29–27	20–25	18–25	25–21	15–9	107–107	Report
4 Jul	19:30	Germany	3–0	Belgium	25–23	25–19	25–18			75–60	Report
5 Jul	17:30	Romania	3–2	Greece	18–25	25–21	24–26	26–24	19–17	112–113	Report
5 Jul	18:00	Germany	2–3	Belgium	21–25	25–19	25–19	15–25	10–15	96–103	Report

==== Leg 6 ====
Date	Time		Score		Set 1	Set 2	Set 3	Set 4	Set 5	Total	Report
10 Jul	20:00	Belgium	3–2	Greece	23–25	25–13	25–20	21–25	15–11	109–94	Report
11 Jul	19:30	Germany	3–1	Romania	25–18	25–19	23–25	25–18		98–80	Report
12 Jul	15:00	Belgium	3–0	Greece	25–21	27–25	25–13			77–59	Report
12 Jul	17:00	Germany	3–0	Romania	25–19	25–20	25–16			75–55	Report

=== Pool C ===
Pos	Team	Pld	W	L	Pts	SW	SL	SR	SPW	SPL	SPR	Qualification
1	Slovakia	12	9	3	21	29	11	2.636	934	812	1.150	Final Four
2	Portugal (Note: Qualified as hosts) (H)	12	6	6	18	19	21	0.905	896	910	0.985	Final Four
3	Belarus	12	6	6	18	21	24	0.875	988	997	0.991	
4	Austria	12	3	9	15	15	28	0.536	914	1013	0.902	

(H) Host

==== Leg 1 ====
Date	Time		Score		Set 1	Set 2	Set 3	Set 4	Set 5	Total	Report
5 Jun	20:00	Slovakia	3–0	Portugal	25–16	25–20	25–23			75–59	Report
5 Jun	20:25	Austria	3–1	Belarus	22–25	25–18	25–20	25–21		97–84	Report
6 Jun	17:00	Austria	2–3	Belarus	25–23	16–25	28–26	22–25	13–15	104–114	Report
6 Jun	20:00	Slovakia	3–0	Portugal	25–21	25–20	25–20			75–61	Report

==== Leg 2 ====
Date	Time		Score		Set 1	Set 2	Set 3	Set 4	Set 5	Total	Report
13 Jun	17:00	Portugal	3–0	Slovakia	25–19	25–20	25–20			75–59	Report
13 Jun	18:00	Belarus	3–1	Austria	25–18	24–26	25–17	25–21		99–82	Report
14 Jun	16:00	Portugal	1–3	Slovakia	24–26	12–25	25–18	22–25		83–94	Report
14 Jun	18:00	Belarus	3–1	Austria	25–22	25–18	20–25	25–20		95–85	Report

==== Leg 3 ====
Date	Time		Score		Set 1	Set 2	Set 3	Set 4	Set 5	Total	Report
19 Jun	20:25	Austria	3–0	Portugal	26–24	25–21	25–16			76–61	Report
20 Jun	18:00	Belarus	3–2	Slovakia	25–17	20–25	19–25	25–23	15–10	104–100	Report
20 Jun	19:00	Austria	1–3	Portugal	26–24	24–26	19–25	18–25		87–100	Report
21 Jun	18:00	Belarus	0–3	Slovakia	18–25	18–25	18–25			54–75	Report

==== Leg 4 ====
Date	Time		Score		Set 1	Set 2	Set 3	Set 4	Set 5	Total	Report
27 Jun	17:00	Portugal	3–0	Austria	25–23	25–21	25–17			75–61	Report
27 Jun	20:00	Slovakia	3–0	Belarus	25–15	25–17	25–23			75–55	Report
28 Jun	16:00	Portugal	3–0	Austria	25–14	25–23	25–20			75–57	Report
28 Jun	19:00	Slovakia	3–0	Belarus	25–20	25–12	25–21			75–53	Report

==== Leg 5 ====
Date	Time		Score		Set 1	Set 2	Set 3	Set 4	Set 5	Total	Report
3 Jul	20:00	Slovakia	3–0	Austria	25–16	25–15	25–15			75–46	Report
4 Jul	17:00	Portugal	3–2	Belarus	26–24	22–25	19–25	26–24	21–19	114–117	Report
4 Jul	20:00	Slovakia	3–0	Austria	25–20	25–19	25–19			75–58	Report
5 Jul	16:00	Portugal	3–0	Belarus	25–20	25–20	25–16			75–56	Report

==== Leg 6 ====
Date	Time		Score		Set 1	Set 2	Set 3	Set 4	Set 5	Total	Report
10 Jul	20:25	Austria	3–0	Slovakia	25–18	25–19	25–19			75–56	Report
11 Jul	18:00	Belarus	3–0	Portugal	25–21	25–18	25–17			75–56	Report
11 Jul	20:25	Austria	1–3	Slovakia	19–25	27–25	20–25	23–25		89–100	Report
12 Jul	18:00	Belarus	3–0	Portugal	25–16	28–26	25–20			78–62	Report

== Final four ==
Qualified teams

- Portugal, as host
- Germany
- Spain
- Slovakia

Semi-finals
2009-07-18 – Portimão
Spain	3
Slovakia	1
2009-07-18 – Portimão
Portugal	0
Germany	3

Final
2009-07-19 – Portimão
Spain	2
Germany	3
3rd place
2009-07-19 – Portimão
Slovakia	0
Portugal	3

=== Semifinals ===
Date	Time		Score		Set 1	Set 2	Set 3	Set 4	Set 5	Total	Report
18 Jul	14:30	Spain	3–1	Slovakia	12–25	27–25	30–28	25–19		94–97	Report
18 Jul	17:00	Portugal	0–3	Germany	24–26	20–25	23–25			67–76	Report

=== 3rd place match ===
Date	Time		Score		Set 1	Set 2	Set 3	Set 4	Set 5	Total	Report
19 Jul	17:00	Slovakia	0–3	Portugal	22–25	23–25	21–25			66–75	Report

=== Final ===
Date	Time		Score		Set 1	Set 2	Set 3	Set 4	Set 5	Total	Report
19 Jul	19:30	Spain	2–3	Germany	20–25	25–21	20–25	25–17	7–15	97–103	Report

== Final standing ==
Rank	Team
1st place, gold medalist(s)	Germany
2nd place, silver medalist(s)	Spain
3rd place, bronze medalist(s)	Portugal
4	Slovakia
5	Turkey
6	Belgium
7	Belarus
8	Greece
9	Great Britain
10	Romania
11	Austria
12	Croatia

2009 European League champions

Germany
1st title

12-man Roster for Final Round
Eugen Bakumovski, Marcus Bohme, György Grozer, Max Gunthor, Robert Kromm, Manuel Rieke, Jochen Schöps, Sebastian Schwarz, Patrick Steuerwald, Ferdinand Tille, Dirk Westphal, Georg Wiebel
Head coach
Raúl Lozano

== Awards ==
- Most valuable player
  (Germany) Jochen Schöps
- Best scorer
  (Slovakia) Martin Nemec
- Best spiker
  (Germany) Jochen Schöps
- Best blocker
  (Germany) György Grozer
- Best server
  (Portugal) Valdir Sequeira
- Best setter
  (Spain) Miguel Ángel Falasca
- Best receiver
  (Portugal) André Lopes
- Best libero
  (Slovakia) Martin Pipa
