= Robert Kromm =

German volleyball player (born 1984)

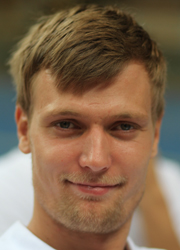

Personal information
- Nationality: Germany
- Born: 9 March 1984 (age 42); Schwerin, East Germany
- Height: 2.12 m (6 ft 11 1/2 in)

Volleyball information
- Position: Outside

Career
Years	Teams
2003–2005; 2005–2006; 2006–2007; 2007–2008; 2008–2009; 2009–2010; 2010–2011; 2011–2012; 2012–2018	SCC Berlin; Pallavolo Modena; Pallavolo Padova; Perugia Volley; Pallavolo Padova; Blu Volley Verona; Ural Ufa; Blu Volley Verona; Berlin Recycling Volleys

National team
2006–2012	Germany
Honours
Men's volleyball
Representing Germany
Men's European Volleyball League
Gold medal – first place	2009 Portimão	Team
- Last updated: May 2011

Robert Kromm (born 9 March 1984 in Schwerin) is a former German volleyball player.

Kromm, who last played for Germany in 2012, has 197 caps with the national team and could reach 200 during the Olympic Qualification tournament. He was officially named the best volleyball player in Germany for 2016. With the German national team, Kromm participated in the 2008 Olympic Games and competed at the 2010 FIVB World Championship.
