= Max Günthör =

German volleyball player (born 1985)

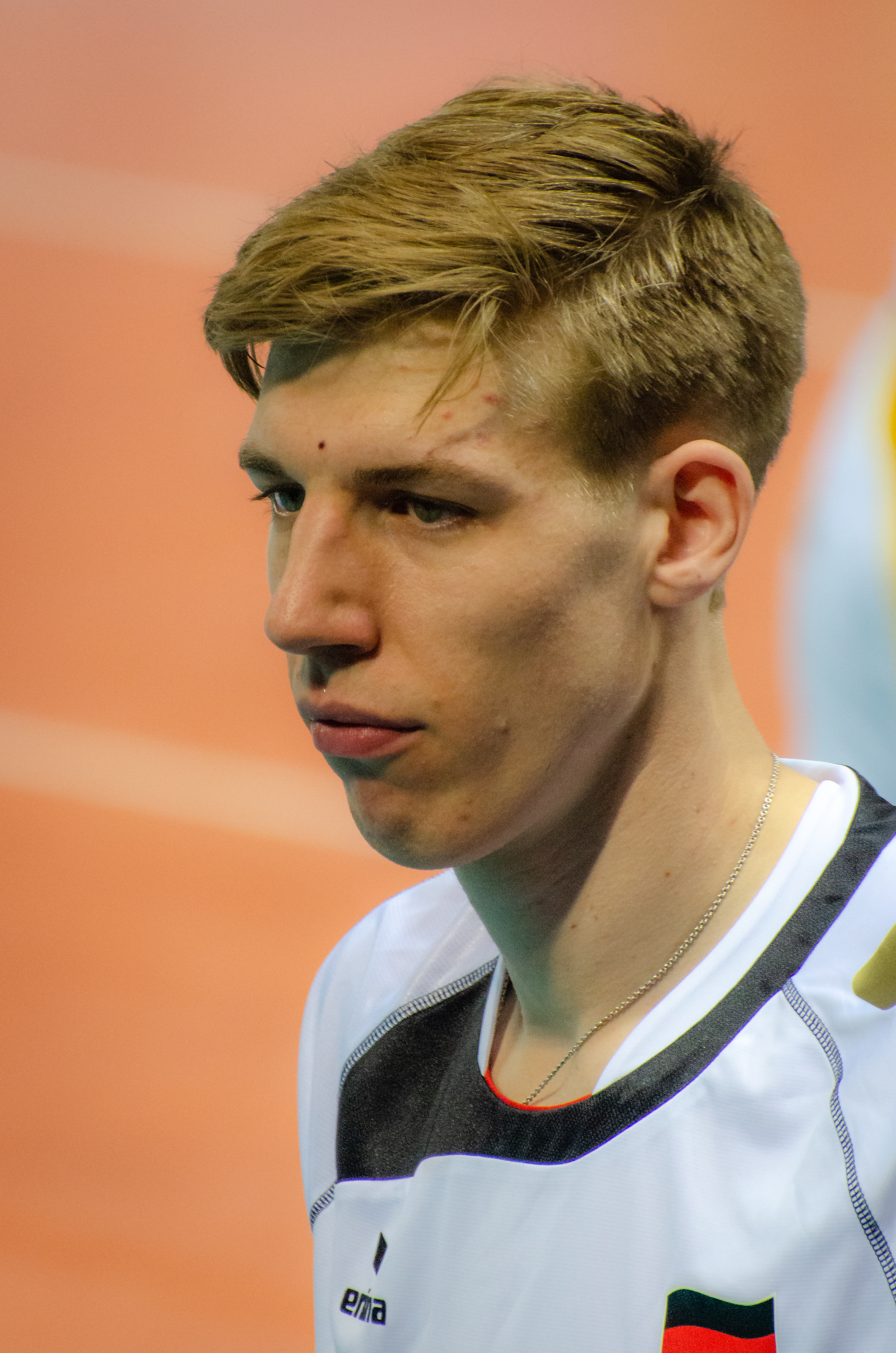

Personal information
- Born: August 9, 1985 (age 41); Friedrichshafen, West Germany
- Height: 2.06 m (6 ft 9 in)
- Weight: 88 kg (194 lb)

Volleyball information
- Position: Middle-blocker
- Current team: VfB Friedrichshafen

National team
Germany
Honours
Representing Germany
Men's volleyball
World Championship
Bronze medal – third place	2014 Poland	Team
European League
Gold medal – first place	2009 Portugal	Team
- Last updated: 21 September 2014

Max Günthör (born 9 August 1985) is a German volleyball player. Max played at the Olympics, European Championship and World League. He won the bronze medal at the World Championship and the Champions league in 2007. Günthör won Best Blocker award in Olympic Games 2012.

== Sporting achievements ==
=== National team ===
==== World Championship ====
- 2014 Poland

==== European League ====
- 2009 Portugal
