= Generali Unterhaching =

German volleyball club

TSV Unterhaching
- Full name: TSV Unterhaching
- Ground: Geothermie Arena
- Chairman: Friedrich G. Liebhart
- Manager: Mirceas Dudas
- League: Volleyball-Bundesliga
- 2023/24: 11th
- Website: Club home page

Uniforms
| Home | Away |

TSV Unterhaching is a German volleyball club which plays its home matches at the Bayernwerk Sportarena in Unterhaching. It plays in the 1. Bundesliga.

== Honours ==
1. Bundesliga

- Runners up: 2009, 2010, 2012

German Cup

- Winners (4): 2009, 2010, 2011, 2013

== Team ==
As of 2024-25 Season

| No. | Name | Date of birth | Position |
|---|---|---|---|
| 3 | (Germany) Moritz Eckardt | 15.06.2001 | libero |
| 4 | (Canada) Matthew Passalent | 08.06.1997 | opposite |
| 5 | (Germany) Florian Krenkel | 17.02.2001 | outside hitter |
| 6 | (Canada) George Hobern | 09.12.1996 | middle blocker |
| 7 | (United States) Austin Matautia | 09.02.1998 | outside hitter |
| 9 | (United States) A. J. Lewis | | outside hitter |
| 10 | (Germany) Daniel Günther | 24.10.2005 | middle blocker |
| 11 | (Bosnia and Herzegovina) Marko Milovanović | 23.04.1998 | opposite |
| 12 | (Netherlands) Time De Jong | 10.11.2001 | setter |
| 13 | (Germany) Mark Gumenjuk | 24.01.2000 | middle blocker |
| 15 | (Germany) Sebastian Rösler | 02.11.2001 | middle blocker |
| 17 | (Germany) Eric Paduretu | 20.09.1999 | middle blocker |
| Head coach: | | (Romania) Mircea Dudas | |

== See also ==
- Germany men's national volleyball team
