= 2009–10 CEV Cup =

- League: CEV Cup
- Sport: Volleyball
- Duration: 2 December 2009 – 28 March 2010

Finals
- Champions: (Italy) Bre Banca Lannutti Cuneo
- Runners-up: (Russia) Iskra Odintsovo
- Finals MVP: (Belgium) Wout Wijsmans (CUN)

CEV Cup seasons
- ← 2008–09 2010–11 →

The 2009–10 CEV Cup was the 38th edition of the European CEV Cup volleyball club tournament.

Italian club Bre Banca Lannutti Cuneo beat Russian club Iskra Odintsovo in the finale. Belgian player Wout Wijsmans was awarded Most Valuable Player of the tournament.

== Participating teams ==
Country	Number of teams	Teams
Austria	1	aon hotVolleys Vienna
Belgium	2 +1	PNV Waasland Kruibeke, Euphony Asse Lennik, Noliko Maaseik
Croatia	1	MOK Zagreb
Cyprus	1	Anorthosis Famagusta
Czech Republic	1	VK Dukla Liberec
Estonia	1	Selver Tallinn
Finland	2	Isku Tampere, Perungan Pojat Rovaniemi
France	2 +1	Montpellier UC, Tourcoing Lille Métropole, Tours VB
Germany	1	Generali Unterhaching
Greece	2	Iraklis Thessaloniki, E.A. Patron
Hungary	1	Kometa Kaposvar
Italy	1 +1	Bre Banca Lannutti Cuneo, Copra Nord Meccanica Piacenza
Montenegro	1	Budućnost Podgorica
Netherlands	1	Dynamo Apeldoorn
Poland	2	AZS Częstochowa, ZAKSA Kędzierzyn-Koźle
Romania	2	Dinamo București, Tomis Constanța
Russia	2	Fakel Novy Urengoy, Iskra Odintsovo
Spain	2 +1	Tarragona SPiSP¹, Portol Palma Mallorca, CAI Teruel
Serbia	1	Crvena Zvezda Beograd
Slovenia	2	Marchiol Vodi Prvacina, Salonit Anhovo Kanal
Switzerland	2	Lausanne UC, TV Amriswil Volleyball
Turkey	1	Arkas Izmir

¹ The Spanish club Tarragona SPiSP withdrew from the European Cups 2009/2010.

== Main phase ==
=== 16th Finals ===
The 16 winning teams from the 1/16 Finals will compete in the 1/8 Finals playing Home & Away matches. The losers of the 1/16 Final matches will qualify for the 3rd round in Challenge Cup.

Team 1	Agg.	Team 2	1st leg	2nd leg	Golden Set
Iskra Odintsovo (Russia)	6–0	(Cyprus) Anorthosis Famagusta	3–0	3–0	
Fakel Novy Urengoy (Russia)	6–0	(Slovenia) Salonit Anhovo Kanal	3–0	3–0	
Tomis Constanța (Romania)	3–3	(France) Montpellier Volley	3–0	0–3	15–17
Domex Tytan AZS Częstochowa (Poland)	4–4	(Germany) Generali Unterhaching	3–1	1–3	15–12
E.A. Patron (Greece)	6–0	(Finland) Perungan Pojat Rovaniemi	3–0	3–0	
Tarragona SPiSP (Spain)	0–6	(Netherlands) Dynamo Apeldoorn	0–3	0–3	
aon hotVolleys Vienna (Austria)	5–4	(Hungary) Kometa Kaposvar	3–1	2–3	
Iraklis Thessaloniki (Greece)	4–3	(Belgium) Euphony Asse Lennik	3–0	1–3	
Portol Palma Mallorca (Spain)	6–0	(Croatia) MOK Zagreb	3–0	3–0	
Isku Tampere (Finland)	1–6	Arkas Izmir	1–3	0–3	
Crvena Zvezda Beograd (Serbia)	6–2	(Belgium) PNV Waasland Kruibeke	3–0	3–2	
Marchiol Vodi Prvacina (Slovenia)	1–6	(Poland) ZAKSA Kędzierzyn-Koźle	1–3	0–3	
Tourcoing Lille Métropole (France)	6–1	(Switzerland) Lausanne UC	3–0	3–1	
Dinamo București (Romania)	1–6	(Montenegro) Budućnost Podgorica	1–3	0–3	
VK Dukla Liberec (Czech Republic)	1–6	(Estonia) Selver Tallinn	0–3	1–3	
TV Amriswil (Switzerland)	1–6	(Italy) Bre Banca Lannutti Cuneo	0–3	1–3	

==== First leg ====
Date	Time		Score		Set 1	Set 2	Set 3	Set 4	Set 5	Total	Report
2 Dec	00:00	Iskra Odintsovo (Russia)	3–0	(Cyprus) Anorthosis Famagusta	25–18	25–18	25–16			75–52	Report
2 Dec	00:00	Fakel Novy Urengoy (Russia)	3–0	(Slovenia) Salonit Anhovo Kanal	25–13	25–16	25–10			75–39	Report
2 Dec	00:00	Tomis Constanța (Romania)	3–0	(France) Montpellier Volley	34–32	25–22	25–15			84–69	Report
2 Dec	00:00	Domex Tytan AZS Częstochowa (Poland)	3–1	(Germany) Generali Unterhaching	25–22	25–20	23–25	25–15		98–82	Report
2 Dec	00:00	E.A. Patron (Greece)	3–0	(Finland) Perungan Pojat Rovaniemi	25–20	25–19	25–21			75–60	Report
–	–	Tarragona SPiSP (Spain)	0–3	(Netherlands) Dynamo Apeldoorn	0–25	0–25	0–25			0–75	
3 Dec	00:00	aon hotVolleys Vienna (Austria)	3–1	(Hungary) Kometa Kaposvar	25–15	24–26	25–23	25–14		99–78	Report
2 Dec	00:00	Iraklis Thessaloniki (Greece)	3–0	(Belgium) Euphony Asse Lennik	25–21	25–22	25–18			75–61	Report
–	–	Portol Palma Mallorca (Spain)	3–0	(Croatia) MOK Zagreb	25–0	25–0	25–0			75–0	Report
2 Dec	00:00	Isku Tampere (Finland)	1–3	(Turkey) Arkas Izmir	18–25	22–25	26–24	23–25		89–99	Report
3 Dec	00:00	Crvena Zvezda Beograd (Serbia)	3–0	(Belgium) PNV Waasland Kruibeke	25–16	26–24	25–22			76–62	Report
3 Dec	00:00	Marchiol Vodi Prvacina (Slovenia)	1–3	(Poland) ZAKSA Kędzierzyn-Koźle	22–25	25–22	15–25	23–25		85–97	Report
2 Dec	00:00	Tourcoing Lille Métropole (France)	3–0	(Switzerland) Lausanne UC	25–16	25–15	25–15			75–46	Report
2 Dec	00:00	Dinamo București (Romania)	1–3	(Montenegro) Budućnost Podgorica	20–25	25–21	19–25	17–25		81–96	Report
2 Dec	00:00	VK Dukla Liberec (Czech Republic)	0–3	(Estonia) Selver Tallinn	19–25	18–25	14–25			51–75	Report
2 Dec	00:00	TV Amriswil (Switzerland)	0–3	(Italy)	22–25	15–25	21–25			58–75	Report

==== Second leg ====
Date	Time		Score		Set 1	Set 2	Set 3	Set 4	Set 5	Total	Report
10 Dec	20:00	Anorthosis Famagusta (Cyprus)	0–3	(Russia) Iskra Odintsovo	19–25	21–25	22–25			62–75	Report
9 Dec	19:00	Salonit Anhovo Kanal (Slovenia)	0–3	(Russia) Fakel Novy Urengoy	13–25	23–25	18–25			54–75	Report
8 Dec	00:00	Montpellier Volley (France)	3–0	(Romania) Tomis Constanța	25–17	25–16	27–25			77–58	Report
Golden set		Montpellier Volley (France)	17–15	(Romania) Tomis Constanța							
9 Dec	19:30	Generali Unterhaching (Germany)	3–1	(Poland) Domex Tytan AZS Częstochowa	22–25	25–18	25–13	25–23		97–79	Report
Golden set		Generali Unterhaching (Germany)	12–15	(Poland) Domex Tytan AZS Częstochowa							
9 Dec	18:30	Perungan Pojat Rovaniemi (Finland)	0–3	(Greece) E.A. Patron	23–25	24–26	20–25			67–76	Report
–	–	Dynamo Apeldoorn (Netherlands)	3–0	(Spain) Tarragona SPiSP	25–0	25–0	25–0			75–0	
8 Dec	00:00	Kometa Kaposvar (Hungary)	3–2	(Austria) aon hotVolleys Vienna	25–22	19–25	17–25	25–18	15–12	101–102	Report
9 Dec	20:00	Euphony Asse Lennik (Belgium)	3–1	(Greece) Iraklis Thessaloniki	25–19	25–23	20–25	25–10		95–77	Report
–	–	MOK Zagreb (Croatia)	3–0	(Spain) Portol Palma Mallorca	25–0	25–0	25–0			75–0	Report
10 Dec	19:00	Arkas Izmir (Turkey)	3–0	(Finland) Isku Tampere	25–16	25–19	25–21			75–56	Report
9 Dec	20:30	PNV Waasland Kruibeke (Belgium)	2–3	(Serbia) Crvena Zvezda Beograd	28–26	24–26	11–25	31–29	10–15	104–121	Report
10 Dec	18:00	ZAKSA Kędzierzyn-Koźle (Poland)	3–0	(Slovenia) Marchiol Vodi Prvacina	25–19	25–15	25–23			75–57	Report
9 Dec	20:00	Lausanne UC (Switzerland)	1–3	(France) Tourcoing Lille Métropole	25–23	16–25	21–25	17–25		79–98	Report
9 Dec	18:00	Budućnost Podgorica (Montenegro)	3–0	(Romania) Dinamo București	25–22	25–20	25–23			75–65	Report
10 Dec	18:00	Selver Tallinn (Estonia)	3–1	(Czech Republic) VK Dukla Liberec	25–18	25–23	22–25	25–19		97–85	Report
9 Dec	20:30	Bre Banca Lannutti Cuneo (Italy)	3–1	(Switzerland) TV Amriswil	25–21	21–25	25–21	25–23		96–90	Report

=== 8th Finals ===
Team 1	Agg.	Team 2	1st leg	2nd leg
Iskra Odintsovo (Russia)	6–1	(Russia) Fakel Novy Urengoy	3–1	3–0
Montpellier Volley (France)	4–5	(Poland) Domex Tytan AZS Częstochowa	1–3	3–2
E.A. Patron (Greece)	5–3	(Netherlands) Dynamo Apeldoorn	3–0	2–3
aon hotVolleys Vienna (Austria)	0–6	(Greece) Iraklis Thessaloniki	0–3	0–3
Portol Palma Mallorca (Spain)	1–6	(Turkey) Arkas Izmir	1–3	0–3
Crvena Zvezda Beograd (Serbia)	0–6	(Poland) ZAKSA Kędzierzyn-Koźle	0–3	0–3
Tourcoing Lille Métropole (France)	6–1	(Montenegro) Budućnost Podgorica	3–0	3–1
Selver Tallinn (Estonia)	1–6	(Italy) Bre Banca Lannutti Cuneo	0–3	1–3

==== First leg ====
Date	Time		Score		Set 1	Set 2	Set 3	Set 4	Set 5	Total	Report
5 Jan	18:00	Iskra Odintsovo (Russia)	3–1	(Russia) Fakel Novy Urengoy	25–23	25–27	25–22	25–21		100–93	Report
7 Jan	20:00	Montpellier Volley (France)	1–3	(Poland) Domex Tytan AZS Częstochowa	20–25	22–25	25–16	22–25		89–91	Report
5 Jan	20:00	E.A. Patron (Greece)	3–0	(Netherlands) Dynamo Apeldoorn	25–19	25–23	25–19			75–61	Report
6 Jan	20:15	aon hotVolleys Vienna (Austria)	0–3	(Greece) Iraklis Thessaloniki	28–30	21–25	22–25			71–80	Report
7 Jan	20:30	Portol Palma Mallorca (Spain)	1–3	(Turkey) Arkas Izmir	28–26	23–25	23–25	23–25		97–101	Report
6 Jan	20:00	Crvena Zvezda Beograd (Serbia)	0–3	(Poland) ZAKSA Kędzierzyn-Koźle	23–25	21–25	18–25			62–75	Report
6 Jan	20:00	Tourcoing Lille Métropole (France)	3–0	(Montenegro) Budućnost Podgorica	25–17	25–21	25–19			75–57	Report
7 Jan	18:00	Selver Tallinn (Estonia)	0–3	(Italy) Bre Banca Lannutti Cuneo	18–25	18–25	20–25			56–75	Report

==== Second leg ====
Date	Time		Score		Set 1	Set 2	Set 3	Set 4	Set 5	Total	Report
12 Jan	18:30	Fakel Novy Urengoy (Russia)	0–3	(Russia) Iskra Odintsovo	20–25	23–25	17–25			60–75	Report
14 Jan	18:15	Domex Tytan AZS Częstochowa (Poland)	2–3	(France) Montpellier Volley	25–13	25–19	18–25	23–25	13–15	104–97	Report
13 Jan	20:30	Dynamo Apeldoorn (Netherlands)	3–2	(Greece) E.A. Patron	22–25	25–17	25–23	20–25	15–13	107–103	Report
13 Jan	19:00	Iraklis Thessaloniki (Greece)	3–0	(Austria) aon hotVolleys Vienna	25–16	25–23	25–23			75–62	Report
14 Jan	19:00	Arkas Izmir (Turkey)	3–0	(Spain) Portol Palma Mallorca	25–14	25–18	25–22			75–54	Report
13 Jan	18:00	ZAKSA Kędzierzyn-Koźle (Poland)	3–0	(Serbia) Crvena Zvezda Beograd	25–20	25–16	25–18			75–54	Report
12 Jan	18:00	Budućnost Podgorica (Montenegro)	1–3	(France) Tourcoing Lille Métropole	22–25	31–29	23–25	19–25		95–104	Report
13 Jan	19:00	Bre Banca Lannutti Cuneo (Italy)	3–1	(Estonia) Selver Tallinn	23–25	25–21	29–27	25–16		102–89	Report

=== 4th Finals ===
Team 1	Agg.	Team 2	1st leg	2nd leg	Golden Set
Iskra Odintsovo (Russia)	6–1	(Poland) Domex Tytan AZS Częstochowa	3–0	3–1	
E.A. Patron (Greece)	4–4	(Greece) Iraklis Thessaloniki	3–1	1–3	15–11
Arkas Izmir (Turkey)	4–5	(Poland) ZAKSA Kędzierzyn-Koźle	3–2	1–3	
Tourcoing Lille Métropole (France)	1–6	(Italy) Bre Banca Lannutti Cuneo	1–3	0–3	

==== First leg ====
Date	Time		Score		Set 1	Set 2	Set 3	Set 4	Set 5	Total	Report
28 Jan	19:00	Iskra Odintsovo (Russia)	3–0	(Poland) Domex Tytan AZS Częstochowa	25–21	25–14	25–15			75–50	Report
27 Jan	20:00	E.A. Patron (Greece)	3–1	(Greece) Iraklis Thessaloniki	25–23	25–19	21–25	25–14		96–81	Report
28 Jan	19:00	Arkas Izmir (Turkey)	3–2	(Poland) ZAKSA Kędzierzyn-Koźle	25–20	29–27	22–25	23–25	18–16	117–113	Report
27 Jan	20:00	Tourcoing Lille Métropole (France)	1–3	(Italy) Bre Banca Lannutti Cuneo	25–27	26–24	23–25	27–29		101–105	Report

==== Second leg ====
Date	Time		Score		Set 1	Set 2	Set 3	Set 4	Set 5	Total	Report
2 Feb	19:00	Domex Tytan AZS Częstochowa (Poland)	1–3	(Russia) Iskra Odintsovo	20–25	25–23	24–26	21–25		90–99	Report
3 Feb	19:00	Iraklis Thessaloniki (Greece)	3–1	(Greece) E.A. Patron	25–13	25–17	22–25	25–17		97–72	Report
Golden set		Iraklis Thessaloniki (Greece)	11–15	(Greece) E.A. Patron							
3 Feb	18:00	ZAKSA Kędzierzyn-Koźle (Poland)	3–1	(Turkey) Arkas Izmir	19–25	25–20	25–16	25–18		94–79	Report
3 Feb	19:00	Bre Banca Lannutti Cuneo (Italy)	3–0	(France) Tourcoing Lille Métropole	25–23	25–19	25–20			75–62	Report

== Challenge phase ==
Team 1	Agg.	Team 2	1st leg	2nd leg	Golden Set
Copra Nord Meccanica Piacenza (Italy)	4–3	(Poland) ZAKSA Kędzierzyn-Koźle	3–0	1–3	
Tours VB (France)	4–6	(Russia) Iskra Odintsovo	2–3	2–3	
CAI Teruel (Spain)	2–6	(Italy) Bre Banca Lannutti Cuneo	2–3	0–3	
Noliko Maaseik (Belgium)	4–4	(Greece) E.A. Patron	3–1	1–3	15–12

=== First leg ===
Date	Time		Score		Set 1	Set 2	Set 3	Set 4	Set 5	Total	Report
25 Feb	20:30	Copra Nord Meccanica Piacenza (Italy)	3–0	(Poland) ZAKSA Kędzierzyn-Koźle	25–18	25–21	25–14			75–53	Report
24 Feb	20:00	Tours VB (France)	2–3	(Russia) Iskra Odintsovo	23–25	25–19	23–25	25–18	9–15	105–102	Report
24 Feb	20:15	CAI Teruel (Spain)	2–3	(Italy) Bre Banca Lannutti Cuneo	13–25	25–16	24–26	25–23	10–15	97–105	Report
23 Feb	20:30	Noliko Maaseik (Belgium)	3–1	(Greece) E.A. Patron	25–18	25–18	16–25	25–20		91–81	Report

=== Second leg ===
Date	Time		Score		Set 1	Set 2	Set 3	Set 4	Set 5	Total	Report
3 Mar	16:00	ZAKSA Kędzierzyn-Koźle (Poland)	3–1	(Italy) Copra Nord Meccanica Piacenza	22–25	25–18	25–19	25–22		97–84	Report
3 Mar	19:00	Iskra Odintsovo (Russia)	3–2	(France) Tours VB	22–25	25–19	28–30	25–17	15–9	115–100	Report
4 Mar	19:00	Bre Banca Lannutti Cuneo (Italy)	3–0	(Spain) CAI Teruel	25–15	25–17	25–16			75–48	Report
3 Mar	20:00	E.A. Patron (Greece)	3–1	(Belgium) Noliko Maaseik	20–25	25–17	27–25	25–23		97–90	Report
Golden set		E.A. Patron (Greece)	12–15	(Belgium) Noliko Maaseik							

== Final phase ==
- Venue: (Belgium) Lotto Dôme, Maaseik

Semifinals
27 March
(Italy) Copra Nord Meccanica Piacenza	0
(Italy) Bre Banca Lannutti Cuneo	3
27 March
(Russia) Iskra Odintsovo	3
(Belgium) Noliko Maaseik	1

Final
28 March
(Italy) Bre Banca Lannutti Cuneo	3
(Russia) Iskra Odintsovo	1
3rd place match
28 March
(Italy) Copra Nord Meccanica Piacenza	1
(Belgium) Noliko Maaseik	3

=== Semi finals ===
Date	Time		Score		Set 1	Set 2	Set 3	Set 4	Set 5	Total	Report
27 Mar	16:00	Copra Nord Meccanica Piacenza (Italy)	0–3	(Italy) Bre Banca Lannutti Cuneo	20–25	22–25	23–25			65–75	Report
27 Mar	20:30	Iskra Odintsovo (Russia)	3–1	(Belgium) Noliko Maaseik	25–19	25–17	25–27	25–20		100–83	Report

=== 3rd place ===
Date	Time		Score		Set 1	Set 2	Set 3	Set 4	Set 5	Total	Report
28 Mar	15:00	Copra Nord Meccanica Piacenza (Italy)	1–3	(Belgium) Noliko Maaseik	20–25	25–23	16–25	19–25		80–98	Report

=== Final ===
Date	Time		Score		Set 1	Set 2	Set 3	Set 4	Set 5	Total	Report
28 Mar	18:00	Bre Banca Lannutti Cuneo (Italy)	3–1	(Russia) Iskra Odintsovo	25–22	21–25	25–21	26–24		97–92	Report

== Final standing ==
Rank	Team
1st place, gold medalist(s)	(Italy) Bre Banca Lannutti Cuneo
2nd place, silver medalist(s)	(Russia) Iskra Odintsovo
3rd place, bronze medalist(s)	(Belgium) Noliko Maaseik
4	(Italy) Copra Nord Meccanica Piacenza

2010 CEV Cup winner
(Italy)
Bre Banca Lannutti Cuneo
4th title

Wout Wijsmans, Hubert Henno, Simone Parodi, Andrea Ariaudo, Francesco Fortunato, Marco Nuti, Gregor Jeroncic, Vladimir Nikolov, Nikola Grbić, Janis Peda, Luigi Mastrangelo, Giuseppe Patriarca
Head coach
Alberto Giuliani

== Awards ==
- Most valuable player

(Belgium) Wout Wijsmans (Bre Banca Lannutti Cuneo)

- Best setter

(Serbia) Nikola Grbić (Bre Banca Lannutti Cuneo)

- Best receiver

(Belgium) Bert Derkoningen (Noliko Maaseik)

- Best libero

(France) Hubert Henno (Bre Banca Lannutti Cuneo)

- Best blocker

(Belgium) Simon Van de Voorde (Noliko Maaseik)

- Best spiker

(Germany) Jochen Schöps (Iskra Odintsovo)

- Best server

(Belgium) Wout Wijsmans (Bre Banca Lannutti Cuneo)

- Best scorer

(Germany) Jochen Schöps (Iskra Odintsovo)
