= Hubert Henno =

French volleyball player (born 1970)

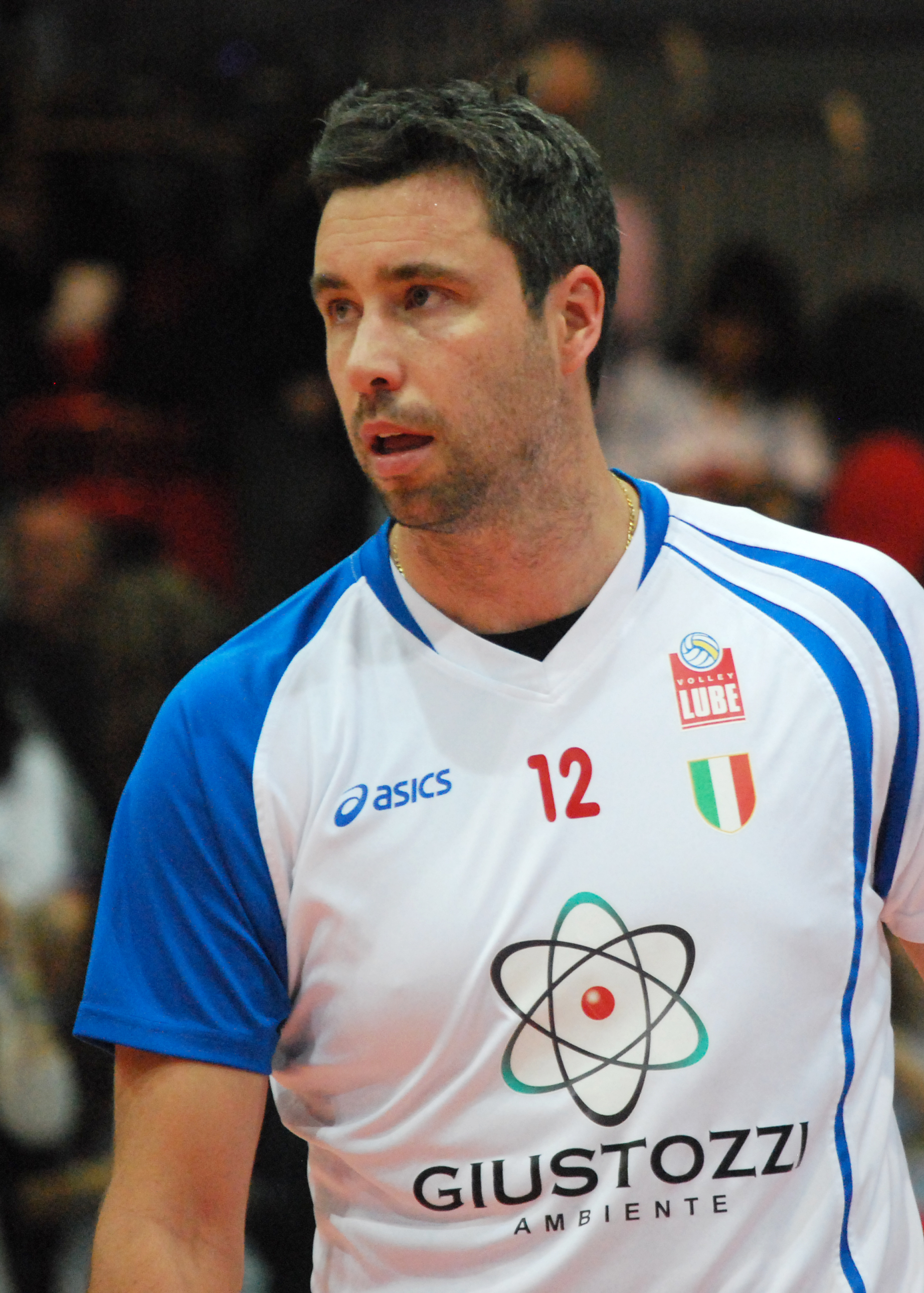

Personal information
- Born: 6 October 1976 (age 50); Boulogne-Billancourt, France
- Height: 1.88 m (6 ft 2 in)

Coaching information
Previous teams coached
Years	Teams
2019–2021; 2021–2024	Tours VB; Nantes Rezé Métropole

Volleyball information
- Position: Libero

Career
Years	Teams
1996–1999; 1999–2002; 2002–2005; 2005–2006; 2006–2008; 2008–2009; 2009–2012; 2012–2015; 2015–2019	Asnières Volley 92; Paris Volley; Tours VB; Dynamo Moscow; M. Roma Volley; Volley Forlì; Bre Banca Lannutti Cuneo; Volley Lube; Tours VB

National team
1999–2010	France (254)
Honours
Men's volleyball
Representing France
FIVB World Championship
Bronze medal – third place	2002 Argentina
CEV European Championship
Silver medal – second place	2003 Germany
Silver medal – second place	2009 Turkey

Hubert Henno (born 6 October 1976) is a French professional volleyball player, a member of France men's national volleyball team. He was participant of the Olympic Games Athens 2004, bronze medalist of the World Championship 2002, silver medalist of the European Championship (2003, 2009), four-time French Champion, double Italian Champion, and Russian Champion.

== Career ==
=== Clubs ===
In 2002-2005 spent in Tours VB and won two French Cups (2003, 2004) and his fourth title of French Champion (2003/2004). In season 2004/2005 won CEV Champions League with the Tours VB and was awarded Best Libero. then moved to Russian League, to VC Dynamo Moscow and as a player of this team achieve title of Russian Champion 2006. In 2006-2008 was the M. Roma Volley player. Season 2008/2009 played for Volley Forlì. Next three season spent as a player of Bre Banca Lannutti Cuneo. In season 2009/2010 won Italian SuperCup 2009 and Championship. In 2010/2011 won Italian Cup and silver medal of Italian Championship. In 2012 moved to Lube Banca Macerata. In 2013/2014, the team won Scudetto (Italian Champion) after matches against Sir Safety Perugia.

== Honours ==
=== As a player ===
- CEV Champions League
  - 2000–01 – with Paris Volley
  - 2004–05 – with Tours VB
- CEV Cup
  - 1999–2000 – with Paris Volley
  - 2007–08 – with M. Roma Volley
  - 2009–10 – with Bre Banca Lannutti Cuneo
  - 2016–17 – with Tours VB
- Domestic
  - 1999–2000 French Cup, with Paris Volley
  - 1999–2000 French Championship, with Paris Volley
  - 2000–01 French Cup, with Paris Volley
  - 2000–01 French Championship, with Paris Volley
  - 2001–02 French Championship, with Paris Volley
  - 2002–03 French Cup, with Tours VB
  - 2003–04 French Cup, with Tours VB
  - 2003–04 French Championship, with Tours VB
  - 2005–06 Russian Championship, with Dynamo Moscow
  - 2009–10 Italian SuperCup, with Bre Banca Lannutti Cuneo
  - 2009–10 Italian Championship, with Bre Banca Lannutti Cuneo
  - 2010–11 Italian Cup, with Bre Banca Lannutti Cuneo
  - 2013–14 Italian Championship, with Volley Lube
  - 2014–15 Italian SuperCup, with Volley Lube
  - 2015–16 French SuperCup, with Tours VB
  - 2017–18 French Championship, with Tours VB
  - 2018–19 French Cup, with Paris Volley
  - 2018–19 French Championship, with Paris Volley

=== As a coach ===
- Domestic
  - 2023–24 French Cup, with Nantes Rezé Métropole

=== Individual awards ===
- 2001: CEV European Championship – Best receiver
- 2002: FIVB World Championship – Best digger
- 2002: FIVB World Championship – Best libero
- 2003: CEV European Championship – Best digger
- 2009: CEV European Championship – Best libero
- 2010: CEV Cup – Best libero

Awards
Preceded by –	Best Receiver of CEV European Championship; 2001	Succeeded by (Italy) Samuele Papi
Preceded by –	Best Libero of FIVB World Championship; 2002	Succeeded by (Russia) Aleksey Verbov
Preceded by (Socialist Federal Republic of Yugoslavia) Vasa Mijić	Best Digger of CEV European Championship; 2003	Succeeded by –
Preceded by (Russia) Alexey Verbov	Best Libero of CEV European Championship; 2009	Succeeded by (Italy) Andrea Bari
