= Glenn Hoag =

Canadian volleyball player and coach (born 1958)

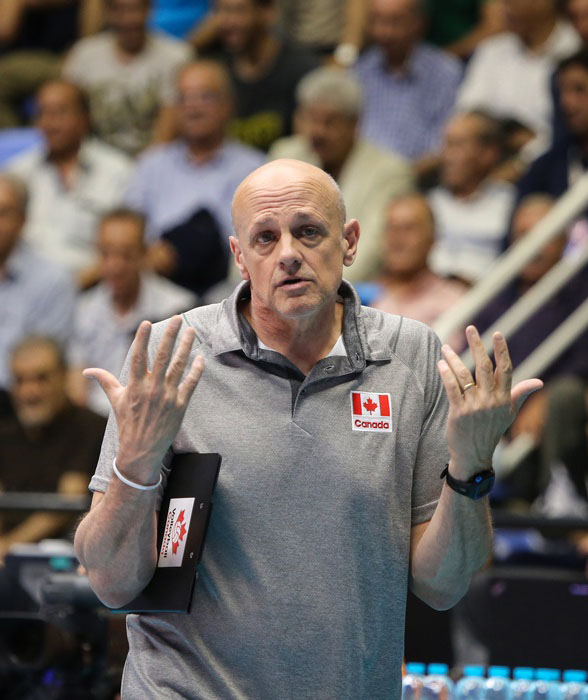

Personal information
- Born: 6 December 1958 (age 67); La Tuque, Quebec, Canada
- Hometown: Sherbrooke, Quebec
- Height: 1.98 m (6 ft 6 in)
- Education: Université de Sherbrooke

Coaching information
- Current team: Arkas İzmir
Previous teams coached
Years	Teams
1993–2006; 1999–2003; 2001–2004; 2006–2016; 2008–2010; 2010– 2018–2021	Sherbrooke Vert et Or; Paris Volley; France (AC); Canada; ACH Volley; Arkas İzmir; Canada

Volleyball information
- Position: Middle blocker

National team
1981–1986	Canada
Honours
Men's volleyball
Head coach Canada
Pan American Games
Bronze medal – third place	2015 Toronto
Pan American Cup
Silver medal – second place	2008 Winnipeg
Silver medal – second place	2009 Chiapas
Bronze medal – third place	2006 Tijuana/Mexicali
Bronze medal – third place	2011 Gatineau
NORCECA Championship
Gold medal – first place	2015 Córdoba
Silver medal – second place	2013 Langley
Bronze medal – third place	2011 Mayaguez

Glenn Hoag is a Canadian professional volleyball coach and former player. He is the current head coach of Arkas İzmir in Turkiye.

== Player ==
Hoag played for the Université de Sherbrooke in his university years, before turning pro and playing overseas in Italy and France.

== Coaching ==
Hoag began his coaching career in 1993 with the University of Sherbrooke. While still at the helm in Sherbrooke, he also began coaching in France, at Paris Volley. His highlight during his tenure in Paris was in 2001 when he coached the team to a Triple Crown victory, winning the French Cup, the French Championship and the European Champions Cup.

In 2006, he was employed as the head coach of the Canada men's national volleyball team. Hoag led the team to a 7th-place finish in both, the World Cup and the World Championships, a bronze medal in the 2015 Pan American Games, Canada's first ever NORCECA Championship title, and a berth in the 2016 Summer Olympics.

In 2018, Hoag returned to coaching the Canadian national volleyball team.

== Personal life ==
Hoag's sons, Nick and Christopher, are both professional volleyball players.

== Honours ==
=== Clubs ===
- CEV Champions League
  - 2000/2001 – with Paris Volley
- CEV Cup
  - 1999/2000 – with Paris Volley
- CEV Challenge Cup
  - 2010/2011 – with Arkas İzmir
- National championships
  - 1999/2000 French Cup, with Paris Volley
  - 1999/2000 French Championship, with Paris Volley
  - 2000/2001 French Cup, with Paris Volley
  - 2000/2001 French Championship, with Paris Volley
  - 2001/2002 French Championship, with Paris Volley
  - 2002/2003 French Championship, with Paris Volley
  - 2008/2009 Slovenian Cup, with ACH Volley
  - 2008/2009 Slovenian Championship, with ACH Volley
  - 2009/2010 Slovenian Cup, with ACH Volley
  - 2009/2010 Slovenian Championship, with ACH Volley
  - 2010/2011 Turkish Cup, with Arkas İzmir
  - 2012/2013 Turkish Championship, with Arkas İzmir
  - 2014/2015 Turkish Championship, with Arkas İzmir
  - 2021/2022 Turkish Cup, with Arkas İzmir

Sporting positions
Preceded by (Canada) Stelio DeRocco	Head coach of Canada; 2006–2016	Succeeded by (France) Stéphane Antiga
Preceded by (France) Stéphane Antiga	Head coach of Canada; 2018–2021	Succeeded by (Canada) Ben Josephson
