= 2024–25 Austrian Volley League Men =

Austrian volleyball league

2024–25 powerfusion Austrian Volley League Men
- League: Austrian Volley League Men
- Sport: Volleyball
- Duration: 5 October 2024 – May 2025
- Teams: 10

Seasons
- 2023–24 2025–26

The 2024–25 Austria Volley League Men officially known as the powerfusion Austria Volley League Men for sponsorship reasons) marks the 72nd season of the Austrian Volleyball Championship. The league is operated by the Austrian Volleyball Federation (German: Österreichischer Volleyball Verband).

This season is composed of 10 teams. The regular season is played as a round-robin tournament. Each team plays a total of 18 matches, half at home and half away. The season then continues with the playoffs and placement matches. The season started on 5 October 2024 and will conclude in May 2025.

== Regular season ==
Ranking system:

1. Points
2. Number of victories
3. Set ratio
4. Setpoint ratio
5. H2H results

Result	Winners	Losers
3–0	3 points	0 points
3–1	3 points	0 points
3–2	2 points	1 point

Pos	Team	Pld	W	L	Pts	SW	SL	SR	SPW	SPL	SPR	Qualification or relegation
1	Hypo Tirol Innsbruck	18	18	0	54	54	3	18.000	1445	1127	1.282	Quarterfinals
2	TSV Raiffeisen Hartberg	18	15	3	41	45	22	2.045	1573	1396	1.127	Quarterfinals
3	UVC McDonalds Ried/Innkreis	18	13	5	35	40	26	1.538	1506	1413	1.066	Quarterfinals
4	SK Zadruga Aich/Dob	18	13	5	38	43	23	1.870	1528	1403	1.089	Quarterfinals
5	UVC Holding Graz	18	9	9	31	40	32	1.250	1595	1532	1.041	Quarterfinals
6	Union Raiffeisen Waldviertel	18	8	10	24	34	36	0.944	1549	1582	0.979	Quarterfinals
7	VCA Amstetten Niederösterreich	18	6	12	18	28	43	0.651	1488	1625	0.916	Quarterfinals
8	TJ Sokol V/Post SV Wien	18	5	13	16	22	44	0.500	1396	1494	0.934	Quarterfinals
9	Sportunion z+p St. Pölten	18	3	15	10	17	49	0.347	1315	1564	0.841	Relegation round
10	VBK Kelag Wörther-See-Löwen Klagenfurt	18	0	18	3	9	54	0.167	1243	1502	0.828	Relegation round

Updated to match(es) played on 9 February 2025. Source: ÖVV

=== 1st round ===
Date	Time		Score		Set 1	Set 2	Set 3	Set 4	Set 5	Total	Report
5 Oct	17:30	TSV Raiffeisen Hartberg	3–1	Sportunion z+p St. Pölten	22–25	25–13	25–17	25–14		97–69	
5 Oct	17:30	UVC Holding Graz	3–2	TJ Sokol V/Post SV Wien	16–25	25–20	20–25	25–15	15–13	101–98	
5 Oct	18:00	Hypo Tirol Innsbruck	3–0	VBK Kelag Wörther-See-Löwen Klagenfurt	25–21	25–13	25–17			75–51	
5 Oct	18:00	UVC McDonalds Ried/Innkreis	3–0	VCA Amstetten Niederösterreich	28–26	25–20	25–22			78–68	
5 Oct	19:00	SK Zadruga Aich/Dob	3–2	Union Raiffeisen Waldviertel	25–20	24–26	25–21	25–27	15–7	114–101	

=== 2nd round ===
Date	Time		Score		Set 1	Set 2	Set 3	Set 4	Set 5	Total	Report
11 Oct	18:00	VCA Amstetten Niederösterreich	2–3	TSV Raiffeisen Hartberg	25–23	23–25	20–25	25–21	13–15	106–109	
12 Oct	16:30	Sportunion z+p St. Pölten	0–3	SK Zadruga Aich/Dob	14–25	20–25	17–25			51–75	
12 Oct	17:00	VBK Kelag Wörther-See-Löwen Klagenfurt	0–3	UVC Holding Graz	18–25	14–25	21–25			53–75	
12 Oct	19:00	TJ Sokol V/Post SV Wien	1–3	UVC McDonalds Ried/Innkreis	25–19	21–25	18–25	18–25		82–94	
12 Oct	19:00	Union Raiffeisen Waldviertel	1–3	Hypo Tirol Innsbruck	16–25	25–23	17–25	22–25		80–98	

=== 3rd round ===
Date	Time		Score		Set 1	Set 2	Set 3	Set 4	Set 5	Total	Report
19 Oct	18:00	UVC McDonalds Ried/Innkreis	3–0	VBK Kelag Wörther-See-Löwen Klagenfurt	25–20	25–14	25–20			75–54	
19 Oct	19:00	SK Zadruga Aich/Dob	3–0	TJ Sokol V/Post SV Wien	25–16	25–21	25–22			75–59	
20 Oct	16:00	TSV Raiffeisen Hartberg	0–3	Hypo Tirol Innsbruck	29–31	17–25	21–25			67–81	
20 Oct	17:00	Sportunion z+p St. Pölten	1–3	Union Raiffeisen Waldviertel	18–25	20–25	25–22	23–25		86–97	
20 Oct	17:30	VCA Amstetten Niederösterreich	3–2	UVC Holding Graz	25–19	25–22	23–25	28–30	15–13	116–109	

=== 4th round ===
Date	Time		Score		Set 1	Set 2	Set 3	Set 4	Set 5	Total	Report
26 Oct	13:35	UVC Holding Graz	2–3	TSV Raiffeisen Hartberg	25–21	23–25	21–25	25–22	17–19	111–112	
26 Oct	17:00	VBK Kelag Wörther-See-Löwen Klagenfurt	0–3	SK Zadruga Aich/Dob	23–25	19–25	11–25			53–75	
26 Oct	18:00	Hypo Tirol Innsbruck	3–0	Sportunion z+p St. Pölten	25–18	25–20	25–21			75–59	
26 Oct	19:00	TJ Sokol V/Post SV Wien	3–1	VCA Amstetten Niederösterreich	23–25	30–28	25–15	25–20		103–88	
26 Oct	19:00	Union Raiffeisen Waldviertel	0–3	UVC McDonalds Ried/Innkreis	18–25	22–25	17–25			57–75	

=== 5th round ===
Date	Time		Score		Set 1	Set 2	Set 3	Set 4	Set 5	Total	Report
31 Oct	20:00	UVC McDonalds Ried/Innkreis	3–2	UVC Holding Graz	25–18	21–25	26–24	22–25	15–11	109–103	
1 Nov	19:00	Sportunion z+p St. Pölten	0–3	TJ Sokol V/Post SV Wien	18–25	20–25	18–25			56–75	
2 Nov	17:35	SK Zadruga Aich/Dob	0–3	Hypo Tirol Innsbruck	20–25	18–25	19–25			57–75	
2 Nov	19:30	TSV Raiffeisen Hartberg	3–1	Union Raiffeisen Waldviertel	25–22	21–25	25–21	25–14		96–82	
10 Nov	16:30	VCA Amstetten Niederösterreich	3–0	VBK Kelag Wörther-See-Löwen Klagenfurt	25–22	25–20	25–23			75–65	

=== 6th round ===
Date	Time		Score		Set 1	Set 2	Set 3	Set 4	Set 5	Total	Report
9 Nov	17:00	UVC Holding Graz	3–0	Sportunion z+p St. Pölten	25–18	25–17	25–17			75–52	
9 Nov	18:00	Hypo Tirol Innsbruck	3–0	VCA Amstetten Niederösterreich	25–14	25–16	25–18			75–48	
9 Nov	18:00	UVC McDonalds Ried/Innkreis	3–0	SK Zadruga Aich/Dob	25–21	25–19	25–22			75–62	
9 Nov	19:00	Union Raiffeisen Waldviertel	3–0	VBK Kelag Wörther-See-Löwen Klagenfurt	25–21	25–21	25–21			75–63	
10 Nov	18:30	TSV Raiffeisen Hartberg	3–0	TJ Sokol V/Post SV Wien	25–19	25–17	25–15			75–51	

=== 7th round ===
Date	Time		Score		Set 1	Set 2	Set 3	Set 4	Set 5	Total	Report
16 Nov	17:00	VBK Kelag Wörther-See-Löwen Klagenfurt	0–3	TSV Raiffeisen Hartberg	18–25	19–25	23–25			60–75	
16 Nov	19:00	TJ Sokol V/Post SV Wien	0–3	Hypo Tirol Innsbruck	32–34	22–25	19–25			73–84	
16 Nov	19:00	SK Zadruga Aich/Dob	3–2	UVC Holding Graz	23–25	19–25	29–27	25–22	15–9	111–108	
17 Nov	16:30	VCA Amstetten Niederösterreich	0–3	Union Raiffeisen Waldviertel	18–25	21–25	18–25			57–75	
26 Jan	18:00	Sportunion z+p St. Pölten	1–3	UVC McDonalds Ried/Innkreis	24–26	25–22	18–25	20–25		87–98	

=== 8th round ===
Date	Time		Score		Set 1	Set 2	Set 3	Set 4	Set 5	Total	Report
23 Nov	17:00	VBK Kelag Wörther-See-Löwen Klagenfurt	2–3	TJ Sokol V/Post SV Wien	25–19	25–23	18–25	23–25	13–15	104–107	
23 Nov	18:00	Hypo Tirol Innsbruck	3–0	UVC McDonalds Ried/Innkreis	25–20	25–17	25–21			75–58	
23 Nov	19:00	Union Raiffeisen Waldviertel	3–1	UVC Holding Graz	25–22	25–16	21–25	25–21		96–84	
24 Nov	18:00	TSV Raiffeisen Hartberg	3–2	SK Zadruga Aich/Dob	28–26	20–25	25–16	22–25	15–11	110–103	
13 Dec	19:00	VCA Amstetten Niederösterreich	1–3	Sportunion z+p St. Pölten	19–25	25–20	22–25	20–25		86–95	

=== 9th round ===
Date	Time		Score		Set 1	Set 2	Set 3	Set 4	Set 5	Total	Report
29 Nov	19:00	UVC Holding Graz	1–3	Hypo Tirol Innsbruck	23–25	19–25	28–26	24–26		94–102	
30 Nov	18:00	UVC McDonalds Ried/Innkreis	1–3	TSV Raiffeisen Hartberg	25–27	27–29	25–21	22–25		99–102	
30 Nov	19:00	SK Zadruga Aich/Dob	3–1	VCA Amstetten Niederösterreich	15–25	27–25	25–16	25–20		92–86	
30 Nov	19:00	TJ Sokol V/Post SV Wien	2–3	Union Raiffeisen Waldviertel	17–25	25–20	25–17	20–25	14–16	101–103	
1 Dec	16:00	Sportunion z+p St. Pölten	3–1	VBK Kelag Wörther-See-Löwen Klagenfurt	20–25	25–21	25–23	25–21		95–90	

=== 10th round ===
Date	Time		Score		Set 1	Set 2	Set 3	Set 4	Set 5	Total	Report
7 Dec	16:30	TJ Sokol V/Post SV Wien	0–3	UVC Holding Graz	19–25	14–25	24–26			57–76	
7 Dec	17:00	VBK Kelag Wörther-See-Löwen Klagenfurt	0–3	Hypo Tirol Innsbruck	21–25	16–25	18–25			55–75	
7 Dec	19:00	Union Raiffeisen Waldviertel	1–3	SK Zadruga Aich/Dob	20–25	15–25	25–20	19–25		79–95	
8 Dec	17:30	VCA Amstetten Niederösterreich	2–3	UVC McDonalds Ried/Innkreis	15–25	20–25	26–24	25–17	12–15	98–106	
8 Dec	18:00	Sportunion z+p St. Pölten	0–3	TSV Raiffeisen Hartberg	15–25	18–25	14–25			47–75	

=== 11th round ===
Date	Time		Score		Set 1	Set 2	Set 3	Set 4	Set 5	Total	Report
14 Dec	17:30	UVC Holding Graz	3–0	VBK Kelag Wörther-See-Löwen Klagenfurt	25–17	25–20	25–20			75–57	
14 Dec	18:00	UVC McDonalds Ried/Innkreis	3–0	TJ Sokol V/Post SV Wien	25–23	25–15	25–13			75–51	
14 Dec	19:00	SK Zadruga Aich/Dob	3–1	Sportunion z+p St. Pölten	24–26	25–21	25–17	25–18		99–82	
14 Dec	19:30	TSV Raiffeisen Hartberg	3–2	VCA Amstetten Niederösterreich	23–25	25–20	25–18	22–25	15–7	110–95	
14 Dec	20:20	Hypo Tirol Innsbruck	3–0	Union Raiffeisen Waldviertel	25–19	25–21	25–19			75–59	

=== 12th round ===
Date	Time		Score		Set 1	Set 2	Set 3	Set 4	Set 5	Total	Report
21 Dec	17:00	VBK Kelag Wörther-See-Löwen Klagenfurt	1–3	UVC McDonalds Ried/Innkreis	25–21	18–25	14–25	15–25		72–96	
21 Dec	18:00	Hypo Tirol Innsbruck	3–0	TSV Raiffeisen Hartberg	25–17	26–24	25–23			76–64	
21 Dec	19:00	TJ Sokol V/Post SV Wien	0–3	SK Zadruga Aich/Dob	18–25	19–25	22–25			59–75	
21 Dec	19:00	Union Raiffeisen Waldviertel	3–0	Sportunion z+p St. Pölten	27–25	25–20	34–32			86–77	
21 Dec	20:00	UVC Holding Graz	3–1	VCA Amstetten Niederösterreich	21–25	25–13	25–15	25–22		96–75	

=== 13th round ===
Date	Time		Score		Set 1	Set 2	Set 3	Set 4	Set 5	Total	Report
4 Jan	19:00	SK Zadruga Aich/Dob	3–1	VBK Kelag Wörther-See-Löwen Klagenfurt	27–25	23–25	25–21	25–16		100–87	
5 Jan	18:00	TSV Raiffeisen Hartberg	3–1	UVC Holding Graz	25–20	19–25	25–14	25–18		94–77	
6 Jan	16:00	Sportunion z+p St. Pölten	0–3	Hypo Tirol Innsbruck	18–25	17–25	16–25			51–75	
6 Jan	18:00	UVC McDonalds Ried/Innkreis	3–2	Union Raiffeisen Waldviertel	25–21	20–25	20–25	27–25	15–9	107–105	
19 Jan	16:30	VCA Amstetten Niederösterreich	3–0	TJ Sokol V/Post SV Wien	25–20	26–24	28–26			79–70	

=== 14th round ===
Date	Time		Score		Set 1	Set 2	Set 3	Set 4	Set 5	Total	Report
11 Jan	17:00	VBK Kelag Wörther-See-Löwen Klagenfurt	2–3	VCA Amstetten Niederösterreich	22–25	25–20	19–25	25–22	9–15	100–107	
11 Jan	18:00	Hypo Tirol Innsbruck	3–1	SK Zadruga Aich/Dob	25–23	25–27	25–14	25–19		100–83	
11 Jan	19:00	UVC Holding Graz	2–3	UVC McDonalds Ried/Innkreis	23–25	22–25	25–16	25–16	13–15	108–97	
11 Jan	19:00	TJ Sokol V/Post SV Wien	3–2	Sportunion z+p St. Pölten	18–25	25–14	22–25	25–21	15–6	105–91	
12 Jan	17:00	Union Raiffeisen Waldviertel	1–3	TSV Raiffeisen Hartberg	25–22	15–25	16–25	22–25		78–97	

=== 15th round ===
Date	Time		Score		Set 1	Set 2	Set 3	Set 4	Set 5	Total	Report
17 Jan	19:00	VBK Kelag Wörther-See-Löwen Klagenfurt	0–3	Union Raiffeisen Waldviertel	20–25	16–25	21–25			57–75	
18 Jan	18:30	VCA Amstetten Niederösterreich	0–3	Hypo Tirol Innsbruck	18–25	16–25	21–25			55–75	
18 Jan	19:00	SK Zadruga Aich/Dob	3–0	UVC McDonalds Ried/Innkreis	25–15	25–17	25–21			75–53	
18 Jan	19:00	TJ Sokol V/Post SV Wien	0–3	TSV Raiffeisen Hartberg	20–25	22–25	23–25			65–75	
18 Jan	19:00	Sportunion z+p St. Pölten	0–3	UVC Holding Graz	19–25	22–25	19–25			60–75	

=== 16th round ===
Date	Time		Score		Set 1	Set 2	Set 3	Set 4	Set 5	Total	Report
16 Nov	18:00	UVC McDonalds Ried/Innkreis	3–0	Sportunion z+p St. Pölten	25–19	25–16	25–22			75–57	
25 Jan	18:00	Hypo Tirol Innsbruck	3–0	TJ Sokol V/Post SV Wien	25–20	25–22	25–14			75–56	
25 Jan	19:00	Union Raiffeisen Waldviertel	1–3	VCA Amstetten Niederösterreich	24–26	25–14	29–31	16–25		94–96	
25 Jan	20:00	UVC Holding Graz	3–1	SK Zadruga Aich/Dob	25–17	25–22	16–25	25–23		91–87	
26 Jan	18:30	TSV Raiffeisen Hartberg	3–0	VBK Kelag Wörther-See-Löwen Klagenfurt	25–22	25–18	25–15			75–55	

=== 17th round ===
Date	Time		Score		Set 1	Set 2	Set 3	Set 4	Set 5	Total	Report
1 Feb	16:30	TJ Sokol V/Post SV Wien	3–0	VBK Kelag Wörther-See-Löwen Klagenfurt	25–17	25–15	25–20			75–52	
1 Feb	18:00	UVC McDonalds Ried/Innkreis	0–3	Hypo Tirol Innsbruck	21–25	27–29	22–25			70–79	
1 Feb	19:00	Sportunion z+p St. Pölten	2–3	VCA Amstetten Niederösterreich	20–25	25–18	21–25	25–19	12–15	103–102	
1 Feb	19:00	SK Zadruga Aich/Dob	3–0	TSV Raiffeisen Hartberg	25–20	25–20	25–22			75–62	
2 Feb	16:00	UVC Holding Graz	3–1	Union Raiffeisen Waldviertel	25–22	20–25	25–21	25–23		95–91	

=== 18th round ===
Date	Time		Score		Set 1	Set 2	Set 3	Set 4	Set 5	Total	Report
8 Feb	17:00	VBK Kelag Wörther-See-Löwen Klagenfurt	2–3	Sportunion z+p St. Pölten	25–18	23–25	25–14	23–25	8–15	104–97	
8 Feb	17:30	TSV Raiffeisen Hartberg	3–0	UVC McDonalds Ried/Innkreis	25–21	28–26	25–19			78–66	
8 Feb	18:00	Hypo Tirol Innsbruck	3–0	UVC Holding Graz	25–20	25–10	25–17			75–47	
8 Feb	19:00	Union Raiffeisen Waldviertel	3–2	TJ Sokol V/Post SV Wien	25–23	25–17	23–25	22–25	21–19	116–109	
9 Feb	16:30	VCA Amstetten Niederösterreich	0–3	SK Zadruga Aich/Dob	18–25	20–25	23–25			61–75	

== Playoffs ==
Quarterfinals
Hypo Tirol Innsbruck
TJ Sokol V/Post SV Wien
UVC McDonalds Ried/Innkreis
UVC Holding Graz
TSV Raiffeisen Hartberg
VCA Amstetten Niederösterreich
SK Zadruga Aich/Dob
Union Raiffeisen Waldviertel

Semifinals

Final

=== Quarterfinals ===
- (to 3 victories)

==== Quarterfinal A ====
Date	Time		Score		Set 1	Set 2	Set 3	Set 4	Set 5	Total	Report
22 Feb	17:00	Hypo Tirol Innsbruck	–	TJ Sokol V/Post SV Wien	–	–	–			0–0	
26 Feb	19:00	TJ Sokol V/Post SV Wien	–	Hypo Tirol Innsbruck	–	–	–			0–0	
1 Mar	17:00	Hypo Tirol Innsbruck	–	TJ Sokol V/Post SV Wien	–	–	–			0–0	

==== Quarterfinal B ====
Date	Time		Score		Set 1	Set 2	Set 3	Set 4	Set 5	Total	Report
23 Feb	20:20	UVC McDonalds Ried/Innkreis	–	UVC Holding Graz	–	–	–			0–0	
26 Feb	19:00	UVC Holding Graz	–	UVC McDonalds Ried/Innkreis	–	–	–			0–0	
1 Mar	18:00	UVC McDonalds Ried/Innkreis	–	UVC Holding Graz	–	–	–			0–0	

==== Quarterfinal C ====
Date	Time		Score		Set 1	Set 2	Set 3	Set 4	Set 5	Total	Report
22 Feb	19:00	TSV Raiffeisen Hartberg	–	VCA Amstetten Niederösterreich	–	–	–			0–0	
26 Feb	18:30	VCA Amstetten Niederösterreich	–	TSV Raiffeisen Hartberg	–	–	–			0–0	
2 Mar	18:30	TSV Raiffeisen Hartberg	–	VCA Amstetten Niederösterreich	–	–	–			0–0	

==== Quarterfinal D ====
Date	Time		Score		Set 1	Set 2	Set 3	Set 4	Set 5	Total	Report
22 Feb	19:00	SK Zadruga Aich/Dob	–	Union Raiffeisen Waldviertel	–	–	–			0–0	
26 Feb	19:00	Union Raiffeisen Waldviertel	–	SK Zadruga Aich/Dob	–	–	–			0–0	
1 Mar	18:00	SK Zadruga Aich/Dob	–	Union Raiffeisen Waldviertel	–	–	–			0–0	

=== Semifinals ===
- (to 3 victories)

==== Semifinal A ====
Date	Time	Score	Set 1	Set 2	Set 3	Set 4	Set 5	Total	Report
		–	–	–	–			0–0	
		–	–	–	–			0–0	
		–	–	–	–			0–0	

==== Semifinal B ====
Date	Time	Score	Set 1	Set 2	Set 3	Set 4	Set 5	Total	Report
		–	–	–	–			0–0	
		–	–	–	–			0–0	
		–	–	–	–			0–0	

=== Finals ===
- (to 4 victories)

Date	Time	Score	Set 1	Set 2	Set 3	Set 4	Set 5	Total	Report
		–	–	–	–			0–0	
		–	–	–	–			0–0	
		–	–	–	–			0–0	
		–	–	–	–			0–0	

== Placement matches ==
=== 5th – 8th place ===
- (to 2 victories)
- Aggregate score is counted as follows: 3 points for 3–0 or 3–1 win, 2 points for 3–2 win, 1 point for 2–3 loss.
- In case the teams are tied after two legs, a Golden Set is played immediately at the completion of the second leg.

==== Playoff A ====
- Winner goes to the 5th place match, loser to the 7th place match

Date	Time	Score	Set 1	Set 2	Set 3	Set 4	Set 5	Total	Report
		–	–	–	–			0–0	
		–	–	–	–			0–0	

==== Playoff B ====
- Winner goes to the 5th place match, loser to the 7th place match

Date	Time	Score	Set 1	Set 2	Set 3	Set 4	Set 5	Total	Report
		–	–	–	–			0–0	
		–	–	–	–			0–0	

==== 7th place ====
Date	Time	Score	Set 1	Set 2	Set 3	Set 4	Set 5	Total	Report
		–	–	–	–			0–0	
		–	–	–	–			0–0	

==== 5th place ====
Date	Time	Score	Set 1	Set 2	Set 3	Set 4	Set 5	Total	Report
		–	–	–	–			0–0	
		–	–	–	–			0–0	

=== 3rd place ===
- (to 3 victories)

Date	Time	Score	Set 1	Set 2	Set 3	Set 4	Set 5	Total	Report
		–	–	–	–			0–0	
		–	–	–	–			0–0	
		–	–	–	–			0–0	

== Relegation round ==
The relegation round is contested by the 9th and 10th position of the regular season and the top 4 of the 2024–25 2. Bundesliga, who are eligible for the promotion, in a round-robin format.

Ranking system:

1. Points
2. Number of victories
3. Set ratio
4. Setpoint ratio
5. H2H results

Result	Winners	Losers
3–0	3 points	0 points
3–1	3 points	0 points
3–2	2 points	1 point

Pos	Team	Pld	W	L	Pts	SW	SL	SR	SPW	SPL	SPR	Qualification or relegation
1	Sportunion z+p St. Pölten	2	2	0	5	6	3	2.000	192	194	0.990	Promoted
2	VBK Kelag Wörther-See-Löwen Klagenfurt	2	0	2	0	1	6	0.167	194	192	1.010	Promoted
3	hotVolleys Wien	2	1	1	3	3	3	1.000	137	135	1.015	Relegated
4	UNIONvolleys Bisamberg-Hollabrunn	2	1	1	3	3	3	1.000	135	137	0.985	Relegated
5	HIB Volley Graz	2	0	2	2	4	6	0.667	201	209	0.962	Relegated
6	VBC TLC Weiz	2	2	0	4	6	4	1.500	209	201	1.040	Relegated

Updated to match(es) played on 8 February 2025. Source: ÖVV

=== 1st round ===
Date	Time		Score		Set 1	Set 2	Set 3	Set 4	Set 5	Total	Report
12 Oct	14:00	UNIONvolleys Bisamberg-Hollabrunn	3–0	hotVolleys Wien	25–20	25–22	25–20			75–62	
25 Jan	19:00	VBC TLC Weiz	3–2	HIB Volley Graz	22–25	25–19	22–25	25–18	15–12	109–99	
8 Feb	17:00	VBK Kelag Wörther-See-Löwen Klagenfurt	2–3	Sportunion z+p St. Pölten	25–18	23–25	25–14	23–25	8–15	104–97	

=== 2nd round ===
Date	Time		Score		Set 1	Set 2	Set 3	Set 4	Set 5	Total	Report
22 Feb	19:00	Sportunion z+p St. Pölten	–	hotVolleys Wien	–	–	–			0–0	
23 Feb	17:00	VBC TLC Weiz	–	UNIONvolleys Bisamberg-Hollabrunn	–	–	–			0–0	
9 Mar	11:30	HIB Volley Graz	–	VBK Kelag Wörther-See-Löwen Klagenfurt	–	–	–			0–0	

=== 3rd round ===
Date	Time		Score		Set 1	Set 2	Set 3	Set 4	Set 5	Total	Report
1 Mar	16:30	Sportunion z+p St. Pölten	–	VBC TLC Weiz	–	–	–			0–0	
1 Mar	17:00	VBK Kelag Wörther-See-Löwen Klagenfurt	–	hotVolleys Wien	–	–	–			0–0	
30 Mar	11:30	HIB Volley Graz	–	UNIONvolleys Bisamberg-Hollabrunn	–	–	–			0–0	

=== 4th round ===
Date	Time		Score		Set 1	Set 2	Set 3	Set 4	Set 5	Total	Report
8 Mar	17:00	UNIONvolleys Bisamberg-Hollabrunn	–	VBK Kelag Wörther-See-Löwen Klagenfurt	–	–	–			0–0	
8 Mar	19:00	hotVolleys Wien	–	VBC TLC Weiz		–	–	–		0–0	
15 Mar	19:00	Sportunion z+p St. Pölten	–	HIB Volley Graz	–	–	–			0–0	

=== 5th round ===
Date	Time		Score		Set 1	Set 2	Set 3	Set 4	Set 5	Total	Report
22 Mar	14:30	UNIONvolleys Bisamberg-Hollabrunn	–	Sportunion z+p St. Pölten	–	–	–			0–0	
22 Mar	16:30	hotVolleys Wien	–	VBC TLC Weiz	–	–	–			0–0	
22 Mar	19:30	VBC TLC Weiz	–	VBK Kelag Wörther-See-Löwen Klagenfurt	–	–	–			0–0	

=== 6th round ===
Date	Time		Score		Set 1	Set 2	Set 3	Set 4	Set 5	Total	Report
16 Nov	19:30	HIB Volley Graz	2–3	VBC TLC Weiz	25–22	20–25	21–25	25–13	11–15	102–100	
1 Dec	16:00	Sportunion z+p St. Pölten	3–1	VBK Kelag Wörther-See-Löwen Klagenfurt	20–25	25–21	25–23	25–21		95–90	
14 Dec	19:30	hotVolleys Wien	3–0	UNIONvolleys Bisamberg-Hollabrunn	25–23	25–14	25–23			75–60	

=== 7th round ===
Date	Time		Score		Set 1	Set 2	Set 3	Set 4	Set 5	Total	Report
29 Mar	14:30	UNIONvolleys Bisamberg-Hollabrunn	–	VBC TLC Weiz	–	–	–			0–0	
29 Mar	17:00	VBK Kelag Wörther-See-Löwen Klagenfurt	–	HIB Volley Graz	–	–	–			0–0	
29 Mar	19:30	hotVolleys Wien	–	Sportunion z+p St. Pölten	–	–	–			0–0	

=== 8th round ===
Date	Time		Score		Set 1	Set 2	Set 3	Set 4	Set 5	Total	Report
23 Mar	13:30	UNIONvolleys Bisamberg-Hollabrunn	–	HIB Volley Graz	–	–	–			0–0	
5 Apr	17:00	hotVolleys Wien	–	VBK Kelag Wörther-See-Löwen Klagenfurt	–	–	–			0–0	
5 Apr	19:30	VBC TLC Weiz	–	Sportunion z+p St. Pölten	–	–	–			0–0	

=== 9th round ===
Date	Time		Score		Set 1	Set 2	Set 3	Set 4	Set 5	Total	Report
12 Apr	14:30	VBK Kelag Wörther-See-Löwen Klagenfurt	–	VBC TLC Weiz	–	–	–			0–0	
12 Apr	19:00	Sportunion z+p St. Pölten	–	UNIONvolleys Bisamberg-Hollabrunn	–	–	–			0–0	
12 Apr	19:30	HIB Volley Graz	–	hotVolleys Wien	–	–	–			0–0	

=== 10th round ===
Date	Time		Score		Set 1	Set 2	Set 3	Set 4	Set 5	Total	Report
2 Mar	14:30	VBK Kelag Wörther-See-Löwen Klagenfurt	–	UNIONvolleys Bisamberg-Hollabrunn	–	–	–			0–0	
8 Mar	17:00	HIB Volley Graz	–	Sportunion z+p St. Pölten	–	–	–			0–0	
26 Apr	19:30	VBC TLC Weiz	–	hotVolleys Wien	–	–	–			0–0	

== Final standings ==
Qualified for the 2025–26 CEV Champions League
Qualified for the 2025–26 CEV Cup
Qualified for the 2025–26 CEV Challenge Cup
Relegation to the Austrian Volley League Men 2

Rank	Team
1st place, gold medalist(s)	
2nd place, silver medalist(s)	
3rd place, bronze medalist(s)	
4	
5	
6	
7	
8	
9	
10	

== Squads ==
Hypo Tirol Innsbruck
No.	Name	Date of birth	Height	Position	Notes
1	(Brazil) Pedro Frances	30 June 1989	2.08 m (6 ft 10 in)	middle blocker	
2	(Austria) Laurin Albrecht	27 January 2006	1.96 m (6 ft 5 in)	opposite	
3	(Poland) Przemyslaw Kupka	9 March 2001	2.05 m (6 ft 9 in)	opposite	Released
3	(Czech Republic) Matěj Šmídl	25 February 1997	2.05 m (6 ft 9 in)	opposite	
4	(Czech Republic) Adam Provaznik	7 April 2000	1.96 m (6 ft 5 in)	setter	
6	(Austria) Michael Ladner	21 June 1998	1.96 m (6 ft 5 in)	outside hitter	
7	(Brazil) Arthur Nath	30 October 1999	1.91 m (6 ft 3 in)	outside hitter	
8	(United States) Kyle Paulson	30 April 2002	2.03 m (6 ft 8 in)	middle blocker	
9	(Austria) Nicolai Grabmüller	18 April 1996	2.00 m (6 ft 7 in)	middle blocker	
10	(Austria) Luis Gavan	21 December 2008	2.00 m (6 ft 7 in)	outside hitter	
11	(Estonia) Robert Viiber	31 January 1997	2.04 m (6 ft 8 in)	setter	
12	(Austria) Raphael Waldner	27 June 2006	1.98 m (6 ft 6 in)	middle blocker	
13	(United States) Kyle Hobus	19 March 2000	2.04 m (6 ft 8 in)	outside hitter	
14	(Austria) Jacob Kitzinger	11 March 2004	1.84 m (6 ft 0 in)	libero	
15	(Austria) Niklas Kronthaler	14 May 1994	1.94 m (6 ft 4 in)	outside hitter	
16	(Austria) Felix Riccabona	3 March 2006	1.86 m (6 ft 1 in)	setter	
17	(Bulgaria) Danail Dimov	24 March 2003	1.98 m (6 ft 6 in)	opposite	
Head coach:		(Italy) Lorenzo Tubertini			

SK Zadruga Aich/Dob
No.	Name	Date of birth	Height	Position
3	(France) Pierre-Laurent Halagahu	19 March 2001	1.98 m (6 ft 6 in)	opposite
5	(Cuba) Carlos Yoandrys Charles Santana	4 October 2000	1.98 m (6 ft 6 in)	opposite
6	(Austria) Daniel Brandstetter	6 September 2000	1.81 m (5 ft 11 in)	libero
7	(Brazil) Vitor Yudi Yamamoto Luciano	12 March 1999	1.86 m (6 ft 1 in)	outside hitter
8	(Brazil) Henrique Adami	15 December 1997	1.93 m (6 ft 4 in)	setter
9	(Cuba) Bryan Camino Martinez	23 February 2003	1.90 m (6 ft 3 in)	outside hitter
10	(Latvia) Jekabs Dzenis	14 January 2000	1.98 m (6 ft 6 in)	middle blocker
12	(Austria) Noel Simon Jakob Krassnig	30 September 2002	1.92 m (6 ft 4 in)	opposite
13	(Austria) Sebastian Sablatnig	6 May 2002	1.96 m (6 ft 5 in)	middle blocker
18	(Austria) Lukas Writz	2 March 2006	1.82 m (6 ft 0 in)	outside hitter
19	(Austria) Lukas Martin Micheu	8 June 2006	1.83 m (6 ft 0 in)	setter
20	(Austria) Jonas Alexander Micheu	24 September 2007	1.85 m (6 ft 1 in)	outside hitter
51	(Czech Republic) Jakub Klajmon	20 February 2003	1.98 m (6 ft 6 in)	opposite
Head coach:		(Italy) (Brazil) Lucio Antonio Oro		

Sportunion z+p St. Pölten
No.	Name	Date of birth	Height	Position
1	(Austria) Emil Nusterer	22 March 2007	1.86 m (6 ft 1 in)	outside hitter
2	(Austria) Leon Weber	2007	1.78 m (5 ft 10 in)	libero
3	(Austria) Jakob Higer	—	1.94 m (6 ft 4 in)	middle blocker
4	(Austria) Sven Mallasch	31 August 2005	1.90 m (6 ft 3 in)	middle blocker
5	(Austria) Marian Klaffinger	22 March 1997	1.89 m (6 ft 2 in)	outside hitter
6	(Canada) Aidan Saladana	1 August 1996	1.98 m (6 ft 6 in)	outside hitter
7	(Austria) Simeon Bichler	19 May 2000	1.96 m (6 ft 5 in)	middle blocker
8	(Austria) Jonah Zelenka	19 April 2001	1.98 m (6 ft 6 in)	opposite
9	(Austria) Stefan Mayerhofer	15 May 1995	1.94 m (6 ft 4 in)	middle blocker
10	(Austria) Jakob Grasserbauer	14 May 1992	1.90 m (6 ft 3 in)	outside hitter
11	(Austria) Matthias Köstler	15 February 1997	1.90 m (6 ft 3 in)	setter
12	(Austria) Samuel Kremser	15 May 2005	1.80 m (5 ft 11 in)	setter
13	(Austria) Julian Chmelina	—	1.88 m (6 ft 2 in)	middle blocker
14	(Austria) Felix Vonasek	—	—	outside hitter
16	(Austria) Leon Binder	21 July 2000	1.78 m (5 ft 10 in)	libero
17	(Austria) Georg Köstler	15 February 1997	1.90 m (6 ft 3 in)	outside hitter
19	(Austria) Fabian Kraushofer	29 September 2004	1.94 m (6 ft 4 in)	opposite
21	(Austria) Tobias Reinstadler	20 June 2005	1.93 m (6 ft 4 in)	middle blocker
23	(Austria) Matthias Hofinger	7 April 2000	1.90 m (6 ft 3 in)	setter
Head coach:		(Austria) Smail Pezerovic		

TJ Sokol V/Post SV Wien
No.	Name	Date of birth	Height	Position
3	(Czech Republic) Matyáš Toman	27 January 2002	1.90 m (6 ft 3 in)	setter
4	(Austria) Lukas Florian	19 April 2002	1.82 m (6 ft 0 in)	setter
5	(Austria) Lauris Ochaya	2 September 1998	1.84 m (6 ft 0 in)	outside hitter
6	(Austria) Lukas Trauth	7 April 2002	1.78 m (5 ft 10 in)	libero
7	(Austria) Jakob Malicki	19 June 2005	1.92 m (6 ft 4 in)	setter
9	(Croatia) Karlo Jakovac	25 February 2002	2.00 m (6 ft 7 in)	outside hitter
10	(Austria) Tobias Ofner	25 December 2000	1.94 m (6 ft 4 in)	middle blocker
13	(Czech Republic) Jakub Kočvara	27 June 2002	1.95 m (6 ft 5 in)	opposite
14	(Austria) Aaron Reiss	9 May 2000	1.93 m (6 ft 4 in)	middle blocker
15	(Austria) Alexander Csekö	2001	1.92 m (6 ft 4 in)	opposite
17	(Austria) Benedict Waidmann	2002	2.00 m (6 ft 7 in)	middle blocker
18	(Austria) Florian Weikert	18 December 1996	1.81 m (5 ft 11 in)	libero
21	(Czech Republic) Tomáš Tesařík	2004	1.91 m (6 ft 3 in)	outside hitter
25	(Austria) Oszkar Molnar	1 January 2007	1.96 m (6 ft 5 in)	outside hitter
Head coach:		(Austria) Zeljko Grbic		

TSV Raiffeisen Hartberg
No.	Name	Date of birth	Height	Position
1	(Austria) Markus Klement	26 November 2001	1.80 m (5 ft 11 in)	setter
6	(Austria) Matthias Glatz	4 March 2002	1.99 m (6 ft 6 in)	outside hitter
8	(Austria) Maximilian Bruchmann	10 September 2001	1.85 m (6 ft 1 in)	libero
10	(Bulgaria) Vesselin Brendyorfer	13 March 2004	1.91 m (6 ft 3 in)	outside hitter
11	(Austria) Tobias Willimek	29 December 2005	2.05 m (6 ft 9 in)	outside hitter
12	(Austria) Stefan Mülleder	7 February 2005	2.09 m (6 ft 10 in)	middle blocker
13	(Austria) Maximilian Thaller	13 December 1993	1.90 m (6 ft 3 in)	setter
14	(Austria) Alexander Gruber	20 June 2006	1.92 m (6 ft 4 in)	outside hitter
15	(Bosnia and Herzegovina) Đorđe Knezević	22 August 1991	1.97 m (6 ft 6 in)	opposite
16	(Austria) Lukas Glatz	5 January 2005	1.99 m (6 ft 6 in)	outside hitter
17	(Bulgaria) Aleksandar Shopov	31 March 2005	1.90 m (6 ft 3 in)	opposite
18	(Austria) Maximilian Steinböck	17 September 1999	1.94 m (6 ft 4 in)	middle blocker
19	(Austria) Maximilian Schützenhöfer	21 March 2007	1.85 m (6 ft 1 in)	libero
21	(Austria) Richard Hensel	27 February 2004	2.02 m (6 ft 8 in)	middle blocker
Head coach:		(Austria) Markus Hirczy		

Union Raiffeisen Waldviertel
No.	Name	Date of birth	Height	Position
2	(Austria) Samuel Müller	30 December 2003	1.90 m (6 ft 3 in)	setter
3	(Austria) Timon Wessely	1 July 2003	1.94 m (6 ft 4 in)	middle blocker
4	(Austria) Paul Kiss	7 November 2005	1.81 m (5 ft 11 in)	libero
7	(United Kingdom) Zacharay Palankai-Omoshebi	11 December 1998	2.15 m (7 ft 1 in)	opposite
8	(Austria) Fabian Scheikl	26 September 2005	1.81 m (5 ft 11 in)	setter
10	(Germany) Niklas Stooß	10 October 1998	1.86 m (6 ft 1 in)	outside hitter
12	(Austria) Simon Dräger	12 December 2006	1.88 m (6 ft 2 in)	outside hitter
13	(Poland) Kornel Kowalewski	26 August 1993	2.02 m (6 ft 8 in)	middle blocker
14	(Ukraine) Illia Dovhyi	1 August 1998	2.00 m (6 ft 7 in)	middle blocker
15	(Austria) Niklas Etlinger	3 August 1999	1.90 m (6 ft 3 in)	outside hitter
19	(Bosnia and Herzegovina) Matej Ivic	27 January 1999	1.85 m (6 ft 1 in)	libero
22	(Austria) Paul Nusterer	13 June 2005	2.09 m (6 ft 10 in)	outside hitter
24	(Poland) Mateusz Sniezek	15 February 1997	1.96 m (6 ft 5 in)	opposite
91	(Poland) Damian Baran	7 April 1999	1.98 m (6 ft 6 in)	middle blocker
96	(Poland) Krzysztof Gulak	29 August 1996	1.95 m (6 ft 5 in)	outside hitter
Head coach:		(Slovakia) Miroslav Palgut		

UVC Holding Graz
No.	Name	Date of birth	Height	Position
2	(Austria) Ulve Steidl	1 June 1993	1.98 m (6 ft 6 in)	middle blocker
4	(Austria) Arwin Kopschar	9 April 1999	1.86 m (6 ft 1 in)	outside hitter
5	(Austria) Felix Kastner	16 April 2005	1.75 m (5 ft 9 in)	libero
6	(Austria) Nils Arvay	19 April 2005	2.00 m (6 ft 7 in)	outside hitter
7	(Austria) Elia Stosch	14 May 2003	1.88 m (6 ft 2 in)	setter
9	(Austria) Johannes Kratz	6 March 1996	1.92 m (6 ft 4 in)	outside hitter
10	(Portugal) José Jardim	1 February 1996	1.85 m (6 ft 1 in)	setter
11	(Hungary) Bence Ambrus	14 May 2001	1.90 m (6 ft 3 in)	middle blocker
12	(Austria) David Reiter	13 November 1996	2.00 m (6 ft 7 in)	middle blocker
16	(Austria) Manuel Schlager-Grebien	28 February 1996	1.95 m (6 ft 5 in)	middle blocker
17	(Austria) Benedikt Sablatnig	1 January 2005	1.96 m (6 ft 5 in)	opposite
21	(Austria) Jakob Katzbeck	1 September 2002	1.93 m (6 ft 4 in)	outside hitter
23	(Austria) Timo Lattinger	13 May 2005	1.93 m (6 ft 4 in)	opposite
34	(Austria) Felix Friedl	24 July 1996	1.99 m (6 ft 6 in)	opposite
64	(Austria) Niklas Steiner	10 February 1995	1.83 m (6 ft 0 in)	libero
Head coach:		(Hungary) Zoltan Mozer		

UVC Holding Graz
No.	Name	Date of birth	Height	Position
2	(Austria) Tobias Pfoser	4 March 2005	1.91 m (6 ft 3 in)	opposite
5	(Austria) Tristan Kitzmüller	10 April 2004	1.86 m (6 ft 1 in)	outside hitter
7	(Ukraine) Borys Zhukov	6 August 1996	2.00 m (6 ft 7 in)	outside hitter
8	(Austria) Jonas Fiel	28 April 2004	1.81 m (5 ft 11 in)	setter
9	(Austria) Liam Hunger	30 November 2005	1.85 m (6 ft 1 in)	middle blocker
10	(Denmark) Joachim Hesselholt	5 November 2001	2.04 m (6 ft 8 in)	middle blocker
12	(Austria) Felix Breit	17 November 1994	2.01 m (6 ft 7 in)	middle blocker
13	(Poland) Tomasz Rutecki	18 September 1990	1.94 m (6 ft 4 in)	opposite
14	(Austria) Hannes Langwieser	15 October 2002	1.73 m (5 ft 8 in)	libero
17	(Austria) Stephan Langwieser	8 April 1999	1.87 m (6 ft 2 in)	libero
18	(Austria) Maximilian Schober	26 April 2001	1.91 m (6 ft 3 in)	libero
22	(Czech Republic) Ondřej Piskáček	23 January 1999	1.92 m (6 ft 4 in)	setter
24	(Austria) Markus Berger	4 August 1995	1.92 m (6 ft 4 in)	outside hitter
34	(Austria) Jonas Mürzl	21 November 2003	1.91 m (6 ft 3 in)	outside hitter
80	(Poland) Gracjan Bozek	15 September 2000	2.05 m (6 ft 9 in)	middle blocker
Head coach:		(Czech Republic) Jiří Siller		

VBK Kelag Wörther-See-Löwen Klagenfurt
No.	Name	Date of birth	Height	Position
1	(Austria) Elias Holzinger	20 August 2004	1.86 m (6 ft 1 in)	outside hitter
5	(Austria) Ben Stockhammer	6 July 2002	1.85 m (6 ft 1 in)	outside hitter
8	(Austria) Mathias Wultsch	25 November 2001	1.95 m (6 ft 5 in)	middle blocker
10	(Austria) Jonas Holzinger	4 May 2002	1.92 m (6 ft 4 in)	middle blocker
11	(Austria) Erik Kolev	19 March 2007	1.87 m (6 ft 2 in)	opposite
13	(Austria) Michael Klemen	17 May 2004	—	opposite
14	(Austria) Adonis Alagić	11 August 2001	1.81 m (5 ft 11 in)	setter
15	(Austria) Johannes Miggitsch	2006	—	libero
16	(Austria) Simon Frühbauer	19 October 1988	1.85 m (6 ft 1 in)	outside hitter
18	(Austria) Paul Eichwald	6 April 2002	—	setter
20	(Austria) Lukas Gober	24 November 2004	—	libero
24	(Austria) Moritz Nedetzky	14 January 2004	—	opposite
27	(Austria) Cooper Boyd	25 October 2007	1.89 m (6 ft 2 in)	setter
29	(Austria) Noah Neunhöffer	29 August 2005	1.95 m (6 ft 5 in)	middle blocker
Head coach:		(Germany) Jonas Kronseder		

VCA Amstetten Niederösterreich
No.	Name	Date of birth	Height	Position
1	(Austria) Julian Kronberger	2006	1.90 m (6 ft 3 in)	outside hitter
2	(Austria) Valentino Decker	2007	1.70 m (5 ft 7 in)	libero
4	(Austria) Patrick Schlederer	29 January 2001	1.84 m (6 ft 0 in)	libero
6	(Hungary) Balasz Bibok	6 March 1999	1.96 m (6 ft 5 in)	opposite
7	(Austria) Robert Gavan	25 April 2003	2.00 m (6 ft 7 in)	opposite
8	(Austria) Alexander Spring	2002	1.93 m (6 ft 4 in)	setter
10	(Croatia) Ivan Mandura	14 March 1997	2.00 m (6 ft 7 in)	middle blocker
11	(Poland) Ignacy Derejczyk	10 February 2004	2.03 m (6 ft 8 in)	middle blocker
14	(Austria) Simon Schlöglhofer	10 October 2008	2.00 m (6 ft 7 in)	opposite
16	(Hungary) Balint Kecskemeti	7 August 2003	2.02 m (6 ft 8 in)	outside hitter
17	(Ukraine) Dima Fedorenko	30 June 1991	1.96 m (6 ft 5 in)	outside hitter
19	(Poland) Igor Gniecki	16 April 2002	1.96 m (6 ft 5 in)	setter
21	(Austria) Niklas Eisenhofer	2003	2.02 m (6 ft 8 in)	middle blocker
22	(Austria) Paul Sernow	1997	1.95 m (6 ft 5 in)	outside hitter
Head coach:		(Slovenia) Andrej Urnaut		

== See also ==
- 2024–25 CEV Champions League
- 2024–25 CEV Cup
- 2024–25 CEV Challenge Cup
