= Błażej Podleśny =

Polish volleyball player (born 1995)

Personal information
- Nationality: (Poland) Polish
- Born: 13 September 1995 (age 31); Pszczyna
- Height: 6 ft 2 in (1.89 m)
- Weight: 172 lb (78 kg)
- Spike: 130 in (330 cm)
- Block: 130 in (320 cm)

Volleyball information
- Position: Setter
- Current club: (Austria) SK Zadruga Aich/Dob
- Number: 13

Career
Years	Teams
2013–2014; 2014–2015; 2015–2016; 2016–2017; 2017–2018; 2018–2020; 2020–	(Poland) TS Volley Rybnik (Poland) Hutnik Dobry Wynik Kraków (Poland) TS Volley Rybnik (Poland) Jastrzębski Węgiel (Poland) TS Volley Rybnik (Czech Republic) VK Ostrava (Austria) SK Zadruga Aich/Dob

Błażej Podleśny (born 13 September 1995) is a Polish volleyball player, playing in position setter.

== Sporting achievements ==
=== Clubs ===
Polish Championship U-21:

- 2014

Czech Championship:

- 2019

Austrian Cup:

- 2021

Austrian Championship:

- 2021

Middle European Volleyball Zonal Association (MEVZA):

- 2022

=== Individual ===
- 2021: MVP Austrian Cup
