= Christopher Hoag (volleyball) =

Canadian volleyball player (born 1988)

Personal information
- Nationality: Canadian
- Born: 3 September 1988 (age 38)
- Hometown: Gatineau, Quebec
- Height: 192 cm (6 ft 4 in)
- Weight: 80 kg (176 lb)
- Spike: 337 cm (133 in)
- Block: 315 cm (124 in)
- Education: University of Calgary

Volleyball information
- Position: Outside hitter

Career
| Years | Teams |
|---|---|
| 2008–2012; 2013–2014; 2014–2015; 2015–2020; 2020–2024 | Calgary Dinos; Tourcoing Lille; Bal Spor; TFL Altekma; İzmir Saint Joseph |

National team
| 2012–2015 | Canada |
- Last updated: 2024-08-01

Christopher Hoag (born 3 September 1988) is a Canadian male professional volleyball player. He is the son of volleyball coach Glenn Hoag and brother of fellow professional volleyball player Nicholas Hoag. He was a part of the Canada men's national volleyball team at the 2013 to 2015 FIVB Volleyball World Leagues.
