= Austrian Volley League Men =

Men's volleyball competition organized by the Austrian Volleyball Federation (ÖVV)

- Current season, competition or edition: 2026–27 Austrian Volley League Men
- Sport: Volleyball
- Founded: 1952
- First season: 1953
- Administrator: ÖVV
- No. of teams: 10
- Country: Austria
- Continent: Europe
- Most recent champion: TSV Raiffeisen Hartberg (2025–26)
- Level on pyramid: Level 1
- Relegation to: 2. Bundesliga
- Domestic cups: Austrian Volley Cup; Austrian Volley Supercup
- International cups: CEV Champions League; CEV Cup; CEV Challenge Cup
- Website: http://www.volleynet.at/

The Austrian Volley League Men is a men's volleyball competition organized by the Austrian Volleyball Federation (ÖVV), it was created in 1952. It is currently a 10 teams league running from September/October to April/May. The season starts with a Supercup match between the League and the Cup champions. The regular season is followed by playoffs, with the winner crowned as Austrian champions.

== History ==
Between 1953 and 1961 the champions of Vienna were also given the title of the Austrian Champions. Since 1962 the league has been organized in the form of the national championships. From 1972 the league was reorganized and restructured in the form of the national league.

== Champions ==
Vienna Championship

- 1953 : TJ Sokol X Wien
- 1954 : TJ Sokol X Wien
- 1955 : TJ Sokol X Wien
- 1956 : TJ Sokol X Wien
- 1957 : ÖMV Olympia Wien
- 1958 : ÖMV Vösendorf Wien
- 1959 : SC ÖMV Blau Gelb Wien
- 1960 : SC ÖMV Blau Gelb Wien
- 1961 : SC ÖMV Blau Gelb Wien

National Championship

- 1962 : SC ÖMV Blau Gelb Wien
- 1963 : SC ÖMV Blau Gelb Wien
- 1964 : SC ÖMV Blau Gelb Wien
- 1965 : SC ÖMV Blau Gelb Wien
- 1966 : SC ÖMV Blau Gelb Wien
- 1967 : SC ÖMV Blau Gelb Wien
- 1968 : TJ Sokol X Wien
- 1969 : ESV Pradl Innsbruck
- 1970 : ESV Pradl Innsbruck
- 1971 : ESV Pradl Innsbruck

National League

- 1972 : DTJ Wien
- 1973 : DTJ Wien
- 1974 : DTJ Wien
- 1975 : DTJ Wien
- 1976 : DTJ Wien
- 1977 : DTJ Wien
- 1978 : DTJ Wien
- 1979 : DTJ Wien
- 1980 : TJ Sokol V Wien
- 1981 : Club A. Tyrolia Wien
- 1982 : Post SV Wien
- 1983 : Club A. Tyrolia Wien
- 1984 : Club A. Tyrolia Wien
- 1985 : Club A. Tyrolia Wien
- 1986 : TJ Sokol V Wien
- 1987 : TJ Sokol V MÖMA Wien
- 1988 : TJ Sokol V MÖMA Wien
- 1989 : TJ Sokol V MÖMA Wien
- 1990 : TJ Sokol V MÖMA Wien
- 1991 : SV Schwechat-TJ Sokol V
- 1992 : Donaukraft Wien
- 1993 : Donaukraft Wien
- 1994 : Donaukraft Wien
- 1995 : USV Paris Lodron Salzburg
- 1996 : Donaukraft Wien
- 1997 : Donaukraft Wien
- 1998 : Donaukraft Wien
- 1999 : Donaukraft Wien
- 2000 : Bayernwerk Vienna
- 2001 : e.on hotVolleys Vienna
- 2002 : Vienna hotVolleys
- 2003 : Vienna hotVolleys
- 2004 : Aon hotVolleys Vienna
- 2005 : Hypo Tirol Innsbruck
- 2006 : Hypo Tirol Innsbruck
- 2007 : Aon hotVolleys Vienna
- 2008 : Aon hotVolleys Vienna
- 2009 : Hypo Tirol Innsbruck
- 2010 : Hypo Tirol Innsbruck
- 2011 : Hypo Tirol Innsbruck
- 2012 : Hypo Tirol Innsbruck
- 2013 : SK Posojilnica Aich/Dob
- 2014 : Hypo Tirol Innsbruck
- 2015 : Hypo Tirol Innsbruck
- 2016 : Hypo Tirol Innsbruck

Austrian Volley League

- 2017 : Hypo Tirol Innsbruck
- 2018 : SK Posojilnica Aich/Dob
- 2019 : SK Posojilnica Aich/Dob
- 2021 : UVC Holding Graz
- 2022 : Union Raiffeisen Waldviertel
- 2023 : Hypo Tirol Innsbruck
- 2024 : Hypo Tirol Innsbruck
- 2025 : Hypo Tirol Innsbruck
- 2026 : TSV Raiffeisen Hartberg

== Teams ==
Location of 2024–25 Austrian Volley League Men teams.

Team	Arena	City
Hypo Tirol Innsbruck	USI Hall 40	Innsbruck
Hypo Tirol Innsbruck	Olympiahalle	Innsbruck
SK Zadruga Aich/Dob	JUFA Arena	Bleiburg
Sportunion z+p St. Pölten	Volksschule Kilb	Kilb
Sportunion z+p St. Pölten	Sporthalle Pöchlarn	Pöchlarn
TJ Sokol V/Post SV Wien	Posthalle	Vienna
TSV Raiffeisen Hartberg	Hartberghalle	Hartberg
Union Raiffeisen Waldviertel	Stadthalle	Zwettl
UVC Holding Graz	Raiffeisen Sportpark	Graz
UVC McDonalds Ried/Innkreis	Raiffeisen Volleydome	Ried im Innkreis
VBK Kelag Wörther-See-Löwen Klagenfurt	BSH Sportpark	Klagenfurt am Wörthersee
VCA Amstetten Niederösterreich	Johann Pölz-Halle	Amstetten

== Total titles won ==
Club	Titles	Seasons
Hotvolleys Vienna	18	1980–81, 1982–83, 1983–84, 1984–85, 1991–92, 1992–93, 1993–94, 1995–96, 1996–97, 1997–98, 1998–99, 1999–2000, 2000–01, 2001–02, 2002–03, 2003–04, 2006–07, 2007–08
Hypo Tirol Innsbruck	13	2004–05, 2005–06, 2008–09, 2009–10, 2010–11, 2011–12, 2013–14, 2014–15, 2015–16, 2016–17, 2022–23, 2023–24, 2024–25
TJ Sokol Wien	12	1952–53, 1953–54, 1954–55, 1955–56, 1967–68, 1979–80, 1985–86, 1986–87, 1987–88, 1988–89, 1989–90, 1990–91
SC ÖMV Blau Gelb Wien	9	1958–59, 1959–60, 1960–61, 1961–62, 1962–63, 1963–64, 1964–65, 1965–66, 1966–67
DTJ Wien	8	1971–72, 1972–73, 1973–74, 1974–75, 1975–76, 1976–77, 1977–78, 1978–79
VC Olympia Innsbruck	3	1968–69, 1969–70, 1970–71
SK Aich/Dob	3	2012–13, 2017–18, 2018–19
ÖMV Olympia Wien	1	1956–57
ÖMV Vösendorf Wien	1	1957–58
Post SV Wien	1	1981–82
USV Paris Lodron Salzburg	1	1994–95
UVC Graz	1	2020–21
Union Volleyball Waldviertel	1	2021–22
TSV Raiffeisen Hartberg	1	2025–26
