= Wout Wijsmans =

Belgian volleyball player

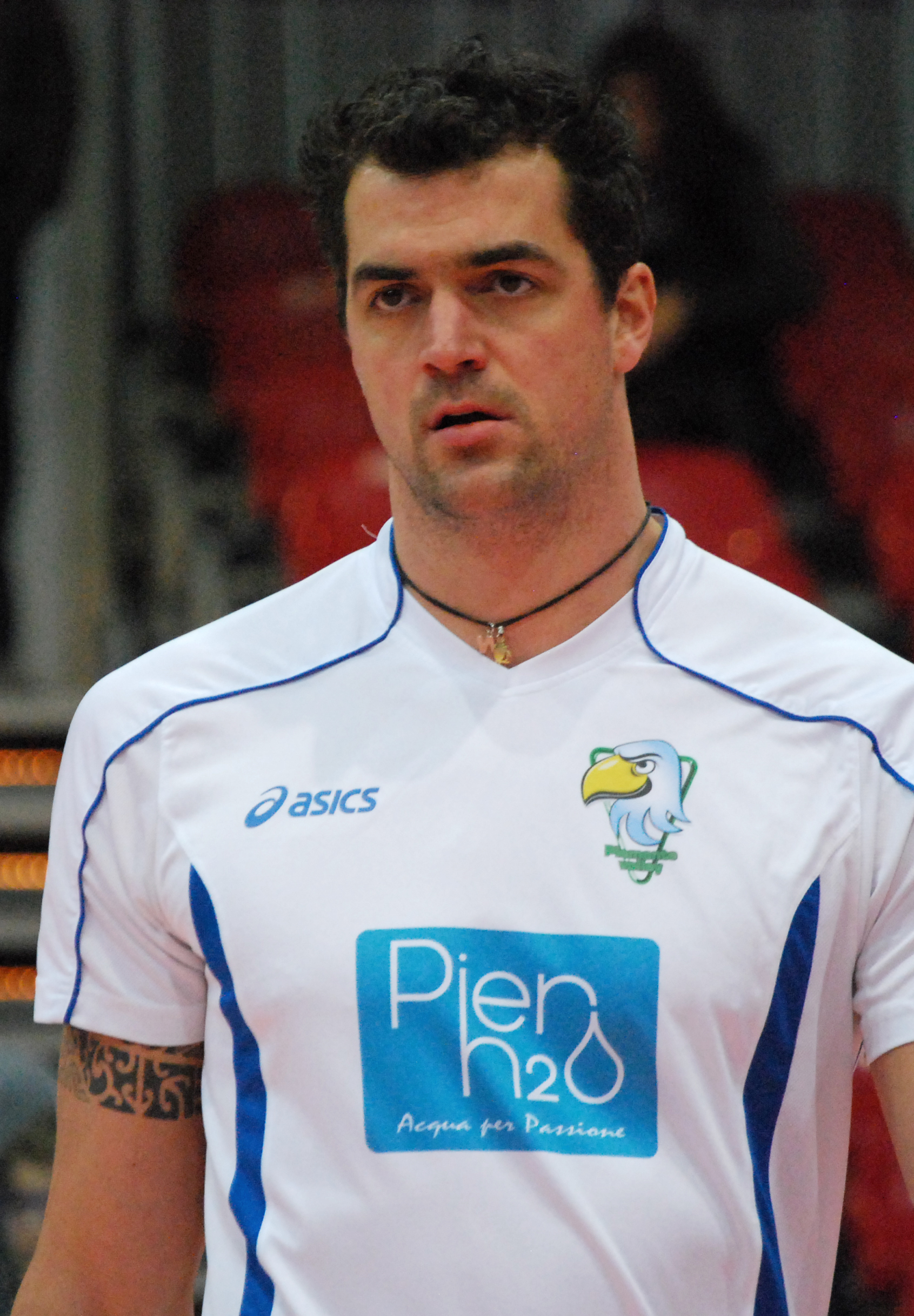
- Wijsmans in 2013

Personal information
- Full name: Wout Wijsmans
- Born: 17 July 1977 (age 49) Hasselt, Belgium
- Height: 2.01 m (6 ft 7 in)

Volleyball information
- Current team: none

Wout Wijsmans (born 17 July 1977 in Hasselt) is a Belgian former volleyball player. He has played at the highest level in Italy from 1999 to 2013, as well as in Belgium, China and Turkey.

== Biography ==
Wijsmans is the son of Noël Wijsmans and Moniek Cauberghe, who were also volleyball players. He grew up in Zonhoven, Scandinavia and Canada. He began his career in 1994 by Trudo Zonhoven. After winning the Belgian cup in 1996 with Zonhoven, the following year he moved to Noliko Maaseik where he won the Supercup two times, the national cup two times and the championship two times.

In 1999, he moved to Italy where he played for Yahoo! Italia Volley Ferrara; in 2001 Wijsmans was hired by Lube Banca Macerata, where he won the CEV Champions League in 2002 and the national cup in 2003. In 2002 he won the award as best attacker of Serie A.

In 2003, he moved to Bre Banca Lannutti Cuneo. Wijsmans won the cup again in 2006. Later, he was appointed as team captain. He abandoned Cuneo in 2013, moving to Beijing Volleyball. Soon after leaving Cuneo, it was announced that the number 7 previously worn by Wijsmans would be retired by the club

In 2015, he returned to Noliko Maaseik wanting to win the championship again. At the end of the season he announced his retirement, his goal not reached. But in the following season he had to play again due to injuries from several players. He retired after that season with only one prize won, the belgian supercup. He became the technical director of Noliko Maaseik.

== Career ==
=== Clubs ===
Club	Country	From	To
VC Helios Zonhoven	Belgium	1994	1997
Noliko Maaseik	Belgium	1997	1999
4Torri Ferrara	Italy	1999	2001
Lube Banca Macerata	Italy	2001	2003
PV Cuneo	Italy	2003	2013
Beijing Baic Motor	China	2013	2014
Fenerbahçe Grundig	Turkey	2014	2015
Noliko Maaseik	Belgium	2015	2017
