= 2000–01 CEV Champions League =

- League: CEV Champions League
- Sport: Volleyball
- Duration: 5 December 2000 – 24 March 2001
- Number of teams: 16

Finals
- Venue: (France) Paris
- Champions: (France) Paris Volley

CEV Champions League seasons
- 2001–02 →

The 2000–01 CEV Champions League was the 42nd edition of the highest level European volleyball club competition organised by the European Volleyball Confederation.

== League round ==
=== Pool A ===
Pos	Team	Pld	W	L	Pts	SW	SL	SR	SPW	SPL	SPR	Qualification
1	(Italy) Ford B. Gesù Roma	6	5	1	11	16	7	2.286	545	497	1.097	4th Finals
2	(Turkey) Arçelik İstanbul	6	4	2	10	14	9	1.556	533	524	1.017	4th Finals
3	(Greece) Iraklis Thessaloniki	6	2	4	8	12	14	0.857	568	573	0.991	
4	(Germany) SCC Berlin	6	1	5	7	5	17	0.294	464	516	0.899	

=== Pool B ===
Pos	Team	Pld	W	L	Pts	SW	SL	SR	SPW	SPL	SPR	Qualification
1	(France) Paris Volley	6	6	0	12	18	5	3.600	550	488	1.127	4th Finals
2	(Poland) Mostostal Azoty Kędzierzyn-Koźle	6	3	3	9	11	11	1.000	474	493	0.961	4th Finals
3	(Bulgaria) Levski Siconco Sofia	6	2	4	8	9	13	0.692	509	512	0.994	
4	(Austria) Hotvolleys Vienna	6	1	5	7	7	16	0.438	503	543	0.926	

=== Pool C ===
Pos	Team	Pld	W	L	Pts	SW	SL	SR	SPW	SPL	SPR	Qualification
1	(Belgium) Knack Roeselare	6	6	0	12	18	3	6.000	519	416	1.248	4th Finals
2	(Russia) Belogorie Belgorod	6	3	3	9	11	10	1.100	459	454	1.011	4th Finals
3	(Germany) VfB Friedrichshafen	6	3	3	9	11	11	1.000	485	502	0.966	
4	(Czech Republic) Jihostroj České Budějovice	6	0	6	6	2	18	0.111	403	494	0.816	

=== Pool D ===
Pos	Team	Pld	W	L	Pts	SW	SL	SR	SPW	SPL	SPR	Qualification
1	(Italy) Sisley Treviso	6	5	1	11	15	6	2.500	484	431	1.123	4th Finals
2	(Greece) Olympiacos Piraeus	6	4	2	10	16	9	1.778	559	520	1.075	4th Finals
3	(France) Tours VB	6	2	4	8	9	15	0.600	509	545	0.934	
4	(Netherlands) Geové Vrevok Nieuwegein	6	1	5	7	7	17	0.412	503	559	0.900	

== 4th Finals ==
Team 1	Agg.	Team 2	1st leg	2nd leg
Belogorie Belgorod (Russia)	0–6	(Italy) Ford B. Gesù Roma	0–3	0–3
Arçelik İstanbul (Turkey)	3–5	(France) Paris Volley	0–3	3–2
Sisley Treviso (Italy)	6–2	(Poland) Mostostal Azoty KK	3–0	3–2
Knack Roeselare (Belgium)	2–6	(Greece) Olympiacos Piraeus	2–3	0–3

=== First leg ===
Date	Time		Score		Set 1	Set 2	Set 3	Set 4	Set 5	Total
14 Feb	18:00	Belogorie Belgorod (Russia)	0–3	(Italy) Ford B. Gesù Roma	21–25	24–26	22–25			67–76
14 Feb	16:30	Arçelik İstanbul (Turkey)	0–3	(France) Paris Volley	26–28	21–25	25–27			72–80
14 Feb	20:30	Sisley Treviso (Italy)	3–0	(Poland) Mostostal Azoty KK	25–21	25–15	25–18			75–54
14 Feb	20:00	Knack Roeselare (Belgium)	2–3	(Greece) Olympiacos Piraeus	25–18	22–25	25–27	25–23	9–15	106–108

=== Second leg ===
Date	Time		Score		Set 1	Set 2	Set 3	Set 4	Set 5	Total
21 Feb	17:30	Ford B. Gesù Roma (Italy)	3–0	(Russia) Belogorie Belgorod	25–19	25–22	27–25			77–66
21 Feb	20:00	Paris Volley (France)	2–3	(Turkey) Arçelik İstanbul	25–20	20–25	26–28	25–18	9–15	105–106
21 Feb	18:00	Mostostal Azoty KK (Poland)	2–3	(Italy) Sisley Treviso	21–25	23–25	25–20	25–23	11–15	105–108
22 Feb	19:00	Olympiacos Piraeus (Greece)	0–3	(Belgium) Knack Roeselare	25–17	25–13	25–19			75–49

== Final Four ==
- Place: (France) Paris
- All times are Central European Time (UTC+01:00).

Semifinals
23 March
(Italy) Ford B. Gesù Roma	1
(France) Paris Volley	3
23 March
(Italy) Sisley Treviso	3
(Greece) Olympiacos Piraeus	0

Final
24 March
(France) Paris Volley	3
(Italy) Sisley Treviso	2
3rd place match
24 March
(Italy) Ford B. Gesù Roma	3
(Greece) Olympiacos Piraeus	2

=== Semifinals ===
Date	Time		Score		Set 1	Set 2	Set 3	Set 4	Set 5	Total
23 Mar	18:00	Ford B. Gesù Roma (Italy)	1–3	(France) Paris Volley	22–25	25–22	21–25	24–26		92–98
23 Mar	20:30	Sisley Treviso (Italy)	3–0	(Greece) Olympiacos Piraeus	25–22	25–20	25–22			75–64

=== 3rd place match ===
Date	Time		Score		Set 1	Set 2	Set 3	Set 4	Set 5	Total
24 Mar	15:00	Ford B. Gesù Roma (Italy)	3–2	(Greece) Olympiacos Piraeus	16–25	20–25	25–22	25–22	15–11	101–105

=== Final ===
Date	Time		Score		Set 1	Set 2	Set 3	Set 4	Set 5	Total
24 Mar	18:00	Paris Volley (France)	3–2	(Italy) Sisley Treviso	25–22	17–25	22–25	25–23	15–13	104–108

== Final standings ==
Rank	Team
1st place, gold medalist(s)	(France) Paris Volley
2nd place, silver medalist(s)	(Italy) Sisley Treviso
3rd place, bronze medalist(s)	(Italy) Ford B. Gesù Roma
4	(Greece) Olympiacos Piraeus

2000–01 CEV Champions League winners
(France)
Paris Volley
1st title
