= Hotvolleys Vienna =

hotVolleys
- Full name: hotVolleys Vienna
- Short name: hotVolleys
- Founded: 1953
- Ground: Vienna

Hotvolleys Vienna is an Austrian volleyball club based in Vienna. The club was founded in 1953 as SK Görz 33.

== Previous names ==
- 1953–1969: SK Görz 33
- 1969–1972: Limex
- 1972–1988: Club A. Tyrolia Wien
- 1988–1999: Donaukraft Volleyballteam Wien
- 1999–2000: Bayernwerk hotVolleys
- 2000–2001: e.on hotVolleys
- 2001–2002: Hotvolleys Wien
- 2002–2003: Vienna hotVolleys
- 2003–2009: Aon hotVolleys
- 2009–present: hotVolleys
